= The Spongers =

- Play for Today episode
- Title card
- Episode no.: Series 8 Episode 14
- Directed by: Roland Joffé
- Written by: Jim Allen
- Original air date: 24 January 1978

Episode chronology
← Previous "Red Shift"	Next → "Destiny"

"The Spongers" is the 14th episode of eighth season of the British BBC anthology TV series Play for Today. The episode was a television play that was originally broadcast on 24 January 1978. "The Spongers" was written by Jim Allen, directed by Roland Joffé, produced by Tony Garnett, and starred Christine Hargreaves, Bernard Hill, Peter Kerrigan, and Paula McDonagh.

Set against the backdrop of Silver Jubilee of Elizabeth II, the play depicts a single mother's struggles as welfare cuts affect the poor and disabled. The derogatory term "spongers" is used by British tabloid press to describe people who are dependent on welfare support, however the play presents the case of a family who really need the help of welfare support. The title sequence shows the title of the play, "The Spongers", superimposed over a picture of Queen Elizabeth II and Prince Philip, Duke of Edinburgh, denoting them as "the real spongers".

== Plot ==
Pauline (Christine Hargreaves), a recently separated single mother-of-four, receives a visit from a bailiff regarding her rent arrears. She is given 15 days to address the issue, yet the bailiff values Pauline's furniture and possessions. This upsets Pauline's daughter, Paula, who has Down's syndrome, and she is comforted by her Auntie Gertie. Meanwhile, nearby, Councillor Conway (Bernard Atha) watches preparations for Jubilee celebrations.

Community action worker Sullivan (Bernard Hill) drives Pauline and Paula past the preparations for the Jubilee on the way to a dedicated home for special needs children. Paula expresses excitement about the Jubilee celebrations. As Pauline settles back into her care home, a meeting of the Labour-controlled council is being run. Conway is confronted over public expenditure cuts.

The following day, Pauline tries to sort out her arrears problems at the DHSS but is refused exceptional needs payments because of her previous grants, electricity arrears, and because she spent her rent allowance on food. The staff at the DHSS suggest she should have used a food coupon, however Pauline says she would have felt embarrassed to use the coupon in the shops as she feared others might think she does not spend money on the children when in fact she does, she just has little money to spare. Later, Pauline's small donation to a Jubilee collection angers her cousin Jackie (Angela Catherall) because of the system's unfair treatment of Pauline.

At the local council meeting, it is revealed that the local government is facing demands for expenditure cuts. In a meeting, councillors review and compare the annual cost of people in residential care (£1,100-£3,800) with community care (£27-£105). The priorities of the local government are revealed when Conway vetoes a reduction in elderly bus passes, as the elderly are more likely to lobby against the decision. Despite the evidence showing that cost for the mentally handicapped in residential care is substantial, Conway approves the cuts to this service, denying that the mentally handicapped will suffer. As Paula and other children happily re-enact the Queen's coronation at her care home, the council agree to cut these services.

Paula is then transferred to an old people's home. As she is the only child there, she has no other children to play with. Instead, she mainly sits silently with elderly people, and her mental state deteriorates. On a visit to the old people's home, Pauline and her father (Peter Kerrigan) complain. Pauline's father doubts that Pauline's social worker, Mrs Johnson (Elaine Lindsay) is committed to help. Inspired, Mrs Johnson then raises Paula's case with her boss, but he blames her inexperience and accuses her of becoming too emotionally involved. He instead suggests that she should help Pauline accept her situation, rather than fight it.

Taking heed of her boss's suggestion, she is absent at independent hearing for Pauline's appeal against the exceptional needs refusal. Instead, Pauline's father tries to help Pauline's case. He states that Pauline was married for 16 years, and that her husband had left one year ago, and that prior to marriage Pauline worked as a machinist in a textiles factory. He points out that it is only recently that Pauline has needed help, and as a survivor of 1930s poverty, he did not believe Britain would return to similar circumstances after 1945. The tribunal advises Pauline to accept rent deductions. Upholding the decision, the chair believes husbands leave families just to get their debts covered by supplementary benefit, and wants to discourage them.

Meanwhile, Paula becomes upset at the home. Pauline, helped by Sullivan, decides to see the Director of Social Services at her local council about Paula's case. The director is unavailable, and Pauline and Sullivan see a representative who defends moving Paula because she is nearer to her hometown. Pauline stresses that Paula needs special care and facilities. Her only alternative is to withdraw Paula and take her home. The representative cannot discuss policy decisions, and Sullivan thinks such officials are themselves bottom of the pile. He tells Pauline to stop blaming herself as the system makes the poor feel inadequate or wicked. Paula's doctor says he was not consulted and fears the home will make Paula regress into disturbance and epileptic fits.

Pauline becomes depressed. The bailiff takes her furniture, complaining that she has not removed personal effects. Gertie and Jackie take Pauline to a club, where Gertie sings and performs comedy. Sullivan and Pauline's father discuss how the system turns worker against worker, and how the stigma of welfare leads to £600 million being unclaimed. Pauline's dad sees himself as a parasite. Conway visits the club and Sullivan approaches him.

Conway investigates Pauline's case, but nothing changes. He tells Sullivan that pushing it would harm his relationship with officers. Conway denies that decisions were motivated by government-dictated financial restraint. Sullivan aggressively denies Conway's claim that Paula's transfer was in the child's interest: he thinks councils target the mentally handicapped for cuts because they cannot fight back. Mocking Sullivan's utopianism, Conway claims that the only way to be a socialist is to face "realistic facts".

Pauline takes Paula home, getting the stronger tablets that Paula has needed while there. The social worker gives discouraging news about Paula's future accommodation. Street parties mark the Jubilee, with Paula involved in a tug-of-war. At night, Pauline puts tablets in drinks she serves to herself and the children, including the baby. Their dead bodies are removed the following day. Some neighbours think Pauline should have fought like everyone else. Sullivan looks on, shocked.

== Credits ==
- Christine Hargreaves as Pauline
- Bernard Hill as Sullivan
- Bernard Atha as Councillor Conway
- Peter Kerrigan as Pauline's father, Peter
- Paula McDonagh as Paula
- Gertie Almond as Gertie, Pauline's Auntie
- Angela Catherall as Jackie, Pauline's Cousin
- Elaine Lindsay as Mrs Johnson, Pauline's social worker
- Fred Pearson as Director of Social Services
- Ina Clough as Deputy Director of Social Services
- Donald Gee as Dr. Whitehead
- Directed by Roland Joffé
- Produced by Tony Garnett
- Written by Jim Allen
- Photography by Nat Crosby
- Edited by Bill Shapter

== Origins and development ==
The play originally came about during a discussion between Tony Garnett and Jim Allen about the withdrawal of mentally handicapped children from a home in Salford, and looking into the relationship between care provisions and local government. The play was also Roland Joffé’s first single directing credit for television; before this he was an experienced theatre director. However, Joffé had been blacklisted: the play's producer, Tony Garnett, was informed that MI5 files listed Joffé as a "security risk" due to his left wing views. Only after Garnett threatened he would "go public", was the veto on Joffé's appointment withdrawn.

Garnett ensured that Joffé, as a new director, would be surrounded by a very experienced crew, stating in a 2012 interview that he "gave him a very good, very experienced director of photography, and a very good, very experienced editor. Whenever you work with a new director, you must surround them with very experienced people. I was very pleased with Roland, I threw him in the deep end and he swam."

Tony Garnett's efforts to achieve authenticity were also rooted further into other aspects of production, such as casting: "I spent months and months on casting. You’ve got to get that absolutely right. If you want to be lazy nowadays, you get your actors off Spotlight. What I did, and I would recommend this to anyone, is to go out there and find your actors. I must have spent... two, two or three months on casting." The decision to cast Northern actors to play Northern roles was deliberate: "it had veracity but also had its logical implications." Garnett drew on his past experience as an actor before he became a story editor on The Wednesday Play: "how can you get a Southern Tory actor to play a Northerner who spends his life down the pits? Or a Southern actress to play a shop girl?" Once cast, it was strongly suggested that actors research their roles. "With actors like Bernard [Atha, who plays Councillor Conway], casting him as the councillor when he is, in fact, a real councillor in Leeds, seemed very logical to me. His job as councillor comes as second nature to him, so he wasn’t particularly bogged down with his character’s actions." Therefore, Atha was able to give a very natural, realistic performance. Christine Hargreaves, who plays Pauline, spent some time living with her on-screen children to develop a bond that "would appear second-nature" on screen. "Christine was brilliant; a lovely, very honest woman. She was great with the kids. She would go out into the community where we filmed, making herself known to the locals, and integrate as much as possible."

Improvisation played an important part in casting, and in the final takes of scenes in the play. Garnett would encourage actors to improvise more and more during each take of the scene. He felt that actors would often hide behind their scripts, and their deliverance would often be too constructed: 'I wanted to expose the actors instead. I wanted them to feel in the moment of the scene and to give realistic beats and responses.' Such improvisation was often disapproved of by Jim Allen; "Jim felt very insecure about improvisation. I would often have to take him on long walks on location to calm him down, as actors weren’t saying his lines word-for-word. He didn’t understand the filming process very much, so he found it very difficult."

This viewpoint was also expressed by Jim Allen in a letter he wrote to Jimmy McGovern; McGovern had written to Allen, requesting he appear on a proposed Channel 4 documentary about working class writers. The programme was never made. Nevertheless, Allen replied with a brief outline of how he works as a writer: "Just for the record, it isn’t true that I only write down ideas then allow actors to ad lib. It’s the director who – with my consent – lets actors improvise. Some like Roland Joffé with The Spongers and United Kingdom perhaps go a bit to [sic] far, but Ken Loach, with whom I’ve made six films, first allows the actor to speak the lines – and then ad lib. But every line, every cough and every spit is written down first – I’m not making a song and dance about this, Jimmy, but it’s as well to get it right."

== Critical reception ==
The play received several awards, including the prestigious Prix Italia. There were mostly positive reviews from the press for its distanced naturalism and avoidance of didacticism which "for some reviewers, made it the masterpiece of that period's socially concerned drama documentaries."

British nostalgia website, TV Cream, describes the play as "one of the most powerful dramas the BBC, or anyone, have shown, and as such presents the strongest possible case for the "naturalism" that many Play for Today writers were determined to get away from. The ensemble playing is brilliantly done, with interruptions and improvised stutters giving a documentary feel that, while grossly overused (even misused) these days, is wholly convincing here."

TV Writer Jimmy McGovern describes the play as "the best television programme ever made", and cites Jim Allen as his biggest influence. Actor Christopher Eccleston also cites the play as "one of the greatest dramas I've ever seen."

== Unmade follow up ==
Jim Allen planned a two-part follow up to "The Spongers", titled The Commune, which was to be set in the same location – Middleton, Greater Manchester, on the impoverished Langley Estate. The drama was to provide a more hopeful outlook for the community than Pauline's story, and would feature residents taking control of running the estate from the local authorities. However, due to Kenith Trodd's production company, Pennies from Heaven Productions and London Weekend Television's spiralling budgets of a trilogy of Dennis Potter plays, this project was shelved.

However, Jim Allen and Kenith Trodd did make a similar story to The Commune, titled "United Kingdom", which was also directed by Roland Joffé and was shown in the Play for Today strand on BBC1. Andy Willis, of BFI Screenonline, describes "United Kingdom" as "one of the last hurrahs of the strain of committed political drama that had thrived, particularly at the BBC, during the 1960s and 1970s. Ambitious in both scope and length and fiercely anti-government – though its early drafts were written before the 1979 Conservative election victory – it represented the kind of drama that BBC managers would find difficult to defend in the face of constrained budgets and political pressure."

== Awards ==
- 1978 Broadcasting Press Guild
- 1978Prix Italia
- 1978 Prague Festival, Best TV Drama
