= In Two Minds =

1967 episode of British TV series The Wednesday Play

- The Wednesday Play episode
- Opening title
- Episode no.: Season 6 Episode 17
- Directed by: Ken Loach
- Written by: David Mercer
- Original air date: 1 March 1967

"In Two Minds" is a television play by David Mercer commissioned for The Wednesday Play (BBC1) anthology drama series. First transmitted on 1 March 1967, it was directed by Ken Loach and produced by Tony Garnett and features Anna Cropper in the lead role.

== Outline and production ==
The play depicts the experiences of Kate Winter, a young woman with schizophrenia, and her experiences with the medical professionals who attempt to care for her in a mental hospital. She is shown being given Electroconvulsive therapy (ECT) as a clinical treatment and being discussed at a lecture for medical students.

In Two Minds was influenced by the ideas of R. D. Laing expressed in his co-authored book, Sanity and Madness in the Family. Attempting to demonstrate that schizophrenia lacks an organic basis in the brain, Laing believed that the family had the potential to make people mentally ill. Mercer and producer Tony Garnett were introduced to Laing and his colleague David Cooper, by the theatre critic Kenneth Tynan; Laing and Cooper served as official consultants on the project.

It is the earliest of Loach's television works to be shot entirely on location, without any use of the television studio. Loach's previous Wednesday Play, Cathy Come Home, contains five brief scenes which were shot electronically. By the time In Two Minds was in production, an agreement had been reached between Equity, the actors' union, and the BBC to allow the shooting of drama entirely on film in the conventional manner.

== Cast ==
- Anna Cropper as Kate Winter
- Brian Phelan as interviewing doctor
- George A. Cooper as Mr. Winter
- Helen Booth as Mrs. Winter
- Christine Hargreaves as Mary Winter
- Peter Ellis as Jake
- Adrienne Frame as hairdresser
- Bill Hays as man at the rehearsal room
- Vickery Turner as woman at the rehearsal room
- Yvonne Quenet as girl in the bar
- Neville Smith as man at the pub
- Malcolm Taylor as man at the pub
- Patrick Barr as consultant
- George Innes as Paul Morris
- Anne Hardcastle as doctor
- Edwin Brown as Mental Warfare officer
- Eileen Colgan as sister
- Julie May as nurse

== Response ==
The play gained mixed response from psychiatrists at the time of its first broadcast, with some arguing that Kate is depressed and hysterical rather than truly schizophrenic.

In his review for The Listener, the novelist Anthony Burgess felt the play had not found a resolution for Kate's problems and found the form of the play problematic. Despite accusing the whole Wednesday Play series as being 'anti-art,' he wrote that In Two Minds "was better than art because it was so real".

Conversely, within the BBC Drama department, the play had led to intense discussions between producer Tony Garnett and department head Sydney Newman over its status as drama and its veracity.

Television critic Anthony Hayward wrote that Cropper displayed "a rollercoaster of emotions, from breaking down on pondering her dilemma to giving a beaming smile, eyes sparkling, while recalling an ex-boyfriend. At times, she talks as if 'Kate' is another person."

== Legacy ==
In Two Minds won the Writers' Guild Award for the Best Television Play of 1967. It is included in the Ken Loach at the BBC 6 DVD box set.

Family Life (1971), again directed by Loach and with a screenplay by Mercer, is a feature film remake of this television play.
