= Bill Dean =

English actor (1921–2000)

- Born: Patrick Anthony Connolly; 3 September 1921; Liverpool, Lancashire, England
- Died: 20 April 2000 (aged 78); Arrowe Park, Merseyside, England
- Years active: 1956-1999

Bill Dean (born Patrick Anthony Connolly; 3 September 1921 – 20 April 2000) was an English actor who was born in Everton, Liverpool, Lancashire. He took his stage name in honour of Everton F.C. legend Dixie Dean.

== Biography ==
Dean served in the Royal Air Force during the Second World War, seeing action in North Africa and Italy. His stage name was apparently inspired by being present when an Italian prisoner of war who had been captured by British troops in the Western Desert, told his captors "fuck your Winston Churchill and fuck your Dixie Dean", the latter being the well-known Everton footballer of the day.

He worked variously as a tram driver, pipe fitter, insurance agent, ship's steward, docker and local government officer, while also appearing as a stand-up comedian in Lancashire clubs and pubs, before making his breakthrough in Ken Loach's The Golden Vision. Other work with Loach followed, including a leading role in the film Family Life (1971).

Dean was most notable in his later years for playing miserly Harry Cross in the soap opera Brookside. He joined the soap in 1983, a year after its inception, and remained there for seven years before departing in 1990. He returned in a cameo for the Brookside video 'Friday the 13th' in 1998 having his lawn driven over, He briefly returned to the series in 1999 for three episodes, when his character re-appeared in Brookside Close suffering from Alzheimer's disease and wrongly believing that he still lived there.

The same character was the inspiration behind the 1980s group 'Jegsy Dodd and the sons of Harry Cross' who hailed from the Wirral.

He also made appearances in numerous other UK soaps and dramas including, When the Boat Comes In, The Sweeney, Minder, Juliet Bravo and Heartbeat, in which he appeared as Harry Capshaw, the ringleader of a group of badger baiters.

His stage work included roles in Trevor Griffiths' play Comedians at The Old Vic, and Howard Brenton's The Churchill Play with the Nottingham Playhouse and then the Royal Shakespeare Company.

Dean also appeared in the video for the single "Groovy Train" by Liverpool band The Farm. He also appeared in the films Kes, Scum, Nightwatch and Let Him Have It.

== Filmography ==
=== Television ===
- ITV Play of the Week – Jacko at War (1964) – German soldier
- Out of the Unknown (1965) – Crewman
- Man in a Suitcase (1967) – British Soldier
- The Wednesday Play – The Golden Vision (1968) – John Coyne
- The Wednesday Play – The Big Flame (1969) – Landlord
- Nearest and Dearest (1969) – Coach Driver
- The Lovers (1970) – Waiter
- ITV Saturday Night Theatre – Roll on Four O'Clock (1970) – Arthur Foster
- After a Lifetime (1971) – Uncle Sid
- A Family at War (1970–1972) – Alan Mills / Labour Agent
- The Last of the Baskets (1972) – Rough man
- Budgie (1972) - "Dutch" Holland, a prisoner
- Public Eye (1973) – Mr. Steadman
- Putting on the Agony (1973) – Leo
- Six Days of Justice (1973) – Mr. William James
- Follyfoot (1973) – Mr. Clegg
- Rooms 2 part episode "Jo & Anne" (1974) Frank
- Second City Firsts (1974) – Ted / Father
- New Scotland Yard (1974) – Bernard Hobbs
- The Sweeney (1975) – Charlie Norton
- The Tomorrow People (1975) – Mr. Greenhead
- The Wackers (1975) – Charlie
- Rocky O'Rourke (1976) – Simpson
- Dixon of Dock Green (1976) – Sam Platte
- Softly, Softly: Task Force (1976) – Alf Bowen
- The Expert (1976) – Leslie Stevens
- Beasts (1976) – Duggie Jebb
- Oh No It's Selwyn Froggitt (1976–1977) – Jack
- Pennies from Heaven (1978) – Alf
- Law and Order (1978) – David Shepley
- Z-Cars (1972, 1978) – Mr. Cosgrave / Danny Marsden / Stanley Cave
- Sounding Brass (1980) – Albert Springfield
- God's Wonderful Railway (1980) – Ted Jarvis
- Minder (1980) – Police Sgt.
- When the Boat Comes In (1981) – Stobbs
- Play for Today (1971, 1973, 1981) – George / Billy
- BBC2 Playhouse (1981) – Painter
- Maybury (1981) – Arthur
- Juliet Bravo (1981) – Mr. Bentham
- Agatha Christie's Partners in Crime (1983) – Mr. Hove
- In Loving Memory (1983) – Garage Attendant
- Brookside (1983–90, 1998, 1999) – Harry Cross / Harold Cross
- Heartbeat (1993) – Harry Capshaw
- The Liver Birds (1996) – Mr. Hennessey / Uncle Jack
- Bloomin' Marvellous (1997) – Ron

=== Film ===
- Murder Ahoy! (1964) – Police Constable (uncredited)
- Those Magnificent Men in their Flying Machines (1965) – German Mechanic (uncredited)
- Praise Marx and Pass the Ammunition (1968) – Liverpool delegate
- Kes (1969) – Fish and Chip Shop Man
- Gumshoe (1971) – Tommy
- Family Life (1971) – Mr. Baildon
- The Best Pair of Legs in the Business (1973) – Bert
- Night Watch (1973) – Inspector Walker
- Flame (1975) – Club Owner (uncredited)
- Scum (1979) – Duke
- Rising Damp (1980) – Workman
- The Mirror Crack'd (1980) – 1st Man in Village Hall (uncredited)
- Slayground (1983) – Compére
- Let Him Have It (1991) – Foreman of the Jury
- Priest (1994) – Altar boy

== Personal life ==
Dean was married, and had three children: two sons, one daughter.

Having been ill for some time he suffered a heart attack and, on 20 April 2000, died at Arrowe Park Hospital on the Wirral, aged 78.
