= Perdition (play) =

London play written by Jim Allen

Perdition is a 1987 stage play by Jim Allen. Its premiere at London's Royal Court Theatre Upstairs, in a production directed by Ken Loach, was abandoned because of protests, and criticism by two historians, over its controversial and tendentious claims.

== Outline ==
The play makes use of a libel trial in Israel in 1954–55 concerning allegations of collaboration during the Second World War in 1944 between the leadership of the Zionist movement in Hungary and the Nazis.

Its starting point was the trial of Rudolf Kastner, a leading member of the Budapest Aid and Rescue Committee, whose job was to help Jews escape from Nazi-ruled Hungary. His libel trial in Israel concerned an accusation that he had collaborated with Adolf Eichmann, one of the main SS officers in charge of carrying out the Holocaust. Although the initial trial found that he had indeed "sold his soul to the devil" by saving certain Jews whilst failing to warn others that their "resettlement" was in fact deportation to the gas chambers, there was a subsequent trial at the Supreme Court of Israel in 1958 at which the findings were overturned. The claim he had collaborated with Eichmann was false. By the time of the appeal, Kastner had been assassinated. A 2017 account by Paul Bogdanor concerning Kastner's activities in Hungary concluded that he did collaborate with Eichmann and his associates. "During the Holocaust in Hungary the acting head of the country's Jewish rescue operations betrayed his duty to rescue the victims and placed himself at the service of the murderers".

The play itself, paralleling the 1954 case, uses the device of another (this time, fictional) libel trial in London in 1967 involving a man called Dr. Yaron who is suing Ruth Kaplan, an Israeli Jew who has claimed Yaron collaborated with Eichmann. Allen queries whether the saving of certain Jews in a purported act of collaboration in line with Zionist philosophies about populating Israel at the expense of those Jews who remained. The play’s text includes such analogies as “the Zionist knife in the Nazi fist” (which was cut in the pre-production period) and accuses Jewish leaders: “To save your hides, you practically led them to the gas chambers of Auschwitz”. Characters assert that “Israel was founded on the pillars of Western guilt and American dollars” and “Israel was coined in the blood of Hungarian Jewry”.

Allen was influenced by activist Lenni Brenner’s book Zionism in the Age of the Dictators (1983), which he described as "a goldmine source". In an interview with Time Out at the time of the intended original production, Allen described his play as "the most lethal attack on Zionism ever written, because it touches the heart of the most abiding myth of modern history, the Holocaust. Because it says quite plainly that privileged Jewish leaders collaborated in the extermination of their own kind in order to help bring about a Zionist state, Israel, a state which is itself racist". According to Allen, during the Holocaust, "the lower you went down on the social scale, the more you found resistance; but the higher you went up the social scale, the more you found cooperation and collaboration [with the Nazis]”. In an interview in The Guardian, Allen claimed Zionists' interests overlapped with Hitler's "on the basis of opportunism." Allen said: "Hitler was fond of the Zionists, they were good Jews, prepared to fight for land."

Chaim Bermant wrote in The Jewish Chronicle that Allen "suggests that the entire leadership of the Zionist movement ... people who strained every ounce of their being to do all that could be done to save European Jews – were involved in a dark conspiracy to betray them." David Cesarani wrote that, like Brenner in his book, Allen drew on anti-Zionist stereotypes originating in the Soviet Union which have a "Jewish conspiracy theory" at their centre.

== Cancellation and controversy ==
In January 1987, the Ken Loach-directed production of Perdition for London's Royal Court Theatre, intended for its Upstairs studio theatre, was cancelled on the day before the first preview performance. At the time, the historian Martin Gilbert said the play was "a complete travesty of the facts" and "deeply anti-Semitic". Gilbert identified 60 errors in the script. He told The Sunday Times:

"In reality there are inaccuracies on almost every page of the script; not only errors of fact, but innuendoes and allegations against thousands of Jews unable to defend themselves because they were murdered... by the very people with whom, the script insists they were in deliberate and sinister collusion."

Another specialist in the field, David Cesarani, agreed. Max Stafford-Clark, then the artistic director of the Royal Court, rejected assertions the play was antisemitic or contained errors, but said that continuing with the production would cause "great distress to sections of the community". Stafford-Clark recalled in 2021 that Stephen Roth, chairman of the Institute of Jewish Affairs, told him that in Allen's text "the Zionist resistance wasn’t mentioned, the confused situation in Budapest wasn’t mentioned and the number saved wasn’t touched on."

In an interview for the book Loach on Loach, Ken said that he "had a shouting match" with Stafford-Clark and refused to tell the cast that the play was being cancelled. Loach says that Stafford-Clark was reprimanded for the decision and for not allowing any compromises, such as performances restricted to agents and friends, before he ordered all the cast off the site of the theatre.

Loach claimed that the Royal Court had given in to pressure from members of the British Jewish community, including Roth, the publisher Lord Weidenfeld, and the political adviser Lord Goodman. Loach told a newspaper of the Workers Revolutionary Party that he "hadn't tangled with the Zionist lobby before" and "what is amazing is the strength and organisation and power of their lobby." The "Zionists", he said "want to leave intact ... the generalised sense of guilt everyone has about the Jews so that it remains an area that you can't discuss". He was also angry with the dramatist Caryl Churchill, who defended Stafford-Clark's decision. Jim Allen himself blamed "the Zionist machine". Cesarani in Jewish Socialist wrote in response to such comments that "the protagonists of the play are willing to manipulate anti-Jewish stereotypes outside of the theatre as well as within it." The Directors Guild of Great Britain protested at the cancellation.

In a letter to The Guardian in 2004, in connection with the premature end of another controversial play's production, Loach wrote that "the charge of antisemitism" against Allen's play "is the time-honoured way to deflect anti-Zionist arguments".

Glenda Abramson wrote in Drama and Ideology in Modern Israel (1998) that, in his play, Allen "uses Zionism rather than Nazism as his exemplar of fascism and the analogy of Israel rather than Nazi Germany in his warning about the future revival of global fascism". In an article for The Jewish Chronicle in 2017, Dave Rich described the play as a "Stalinist lie". He wrote that Loach is one individual who uses the Perdition episode "to try to claim that the entire Zionist movement collaborated in the murder of their fellow Jews; either from cold, cynical calculation – they only cared about getting Jews to Mandate Palestine – or through ideological affinity".

== Later developments ==
In 1999, the play was performed at the Gate Theatre in London in a production by Elliot Levey, Loach's son-in-law, in what David Jay, writing for the New Statesman, described as "a significantly rewritten version". Levey defended the play in 1999: "It is not historically inaccurate. It's very much a pro-Jewish play. My hope is that it won't be sat on, as it was in the 1980s."

Perfidy, by Ben Hecht, is a non-fiction work about the Kastner trial. The title of the play appears to echo Hecht's book.
