= The End of Arthur's Marriage =

- The Wednesday Play episode
- Episode no.: Season 3 Episode 6
- Directed by: Ken Loach
- Written by: Christopher Logue
- Original air date: November 17, 1965

"The End of Arthur's Marriage" is a television satirical musical drama that was an episode in The Wednesday Play series first broadcast on 17 November 1965. It was an early work of director Ken Loach, and the script was written by poet Christopher Logue. It is unusual in Loach's catalogue for the surrealism, and the director later said that he believed himself to have been "the wrong man for the job". Main actor Ken Jones had previously worked with Loach on Wear a Very Big Hat and 3 Clear Sundays and later featured in the controversial 1969 play The Big Flame.

It has never been repeated on the BBC since the showing on 17 November 1965, and the film was rare until its release with the Ken Loach at the BBC DVD box-set in 2011.

== Plot ==
Mavis and Arthur are a married couple with a daughter, Emmy. Mavis's father gives his full life savings, £400, which he says that he had worked so hard to earn that he had never been to a cinema. The agreement is that Arthur and Mavis will use the money as a deposit for a house, although Mavis's parents distrust Arthur and refer to him as a "dreamer".

Arthur and Emmy view a prospective house at the same time as the Thurloe family. After the Thurloes discuss the noises from their bedroom that might disturb others (the dialogue contains a large amount of innuendo), Mr. Thurloe pulls Arthur to one side and begs him to buy the house so that he would not be trapped with Mrs. Thurloe and their son Mark, who tries to proposition Emmy, but she slaps him. Arthur makes an offer for the house, but is rejected as he lacks any documentation to prove that he has the necessary finances. Mrs. Thurloe then makes an offer, which is accepted.

In a park Arthur worries that Emmy will never enjoy being spoiled and resolves to treat her to a trip to the West End of London. He takes her to Fortnum and Masons. After a sales pitch (in song) by a salesman, Arthur buys Emmy an expensive gold watch with a strap made of elephant hair. Meanwhile, Mavis's parents become concerned at Arthur's disappearance with the money and ring the police to report that he and Emmy are missing.

After visiting a cafe, Arthur takes Emmy to the zoo. As the five-millionth customer, Emmy is rewarded with a free visit escorted by the zookeeper Bent, and Arthur and Emmy are given a free ride on an elephant. When Emmy tells Bent that her new watch is made of elephant hair, Bent says that elephants do not have hair and that the alleged hair on her watch is a piece of wire. Arthur's conversation with Bent shows concern about the treatment of the zoo animals, who were born in captivity and given euthanasia when no longer of use. Emmy becomes very attached to the elephant. When Bent says that the elephant is to be put down soon (referred to as "going into the gas chamber"), as a new shipment of elephants is expected, Emmy asks Arthur to buy her the elephant, and he eventually does.

Arthur and Emmy are joined by a group of young people. (The elephant disappears without explanation at this point in the film, which Loach later said he regretted.) The group are shown riding down the canal on a barge and a dance begins with a singer named Lily who strips her top half so that only her bra remains. Arthur dances with her and, in his excitement, throws his remaining money into the canal. Emmy tells him to behave better, and the party ends with two of the young people criticising Arthur as irresponsible. Arthur asks Lily if she would like to come home with him, but she rejects him.

Arthur and Emmy return to Mavis' parents' house, where Mavis and her parents seem to know what has transpired. After Arthur admits that he has used all the money that was given to him, he is prevented from entering and given his belongings in a suitcase, but Emmy is brought inside before the door is closed. Arthur then leaves the suitcase in the garden and walks away.

As the end credits roll, some quotes from the film are repeated before Lily's song from the barge is played again.

== Style ==
The play is unusual for Ken Loach, a director known for social realism, in that it has elements of fantasy and surrealism. Some breakaway scenes fit with the theme of the plot. After the Thurloes beat Arthur and Mavis for the house up for sale, a large football crowd is jubilant in applauding the Thurloes for their success and cease applauding for Arthur. Many couples are shown arguing throughout the film as a constant theme. However, other scenes appear for no apparent reason. The more obscure scenes include reports of the death of tourists in a plane crash, an interview on the history of gas works, a man shaving, two prostitutes' discussing a solicitor who role-plays as Mr. Universe (a dialogue that includes a large amount of sexual innuendo) and a police officer's jumping out of his moving car to ask Arthur for a light for his cigarette.

The use of nudity in the play was unusual on the BBC during the period this drama was broadcast. In 2011, the film was given a 12 certificate by the British Board of Film Classification for "brief sexualised nudity". Shortly after Arthur and Emmy leave Fortnum and Masons, there is a brief scene in which a cafe worker named Harry Otana remembers his home in Africa that contains full frontal nudity. In addition, the scene in the zoo is interrupted by an enactment of the eating of forbidden fruit in the Garden of Eden, in which Adam and Eve are naked, and a close-up of Eve shows her winking at the camera seductively. This scene ends with Adam and Eve as a modern, clothed couple walking from their house to their car. An interpretation of the Garden-of-Eden scene, which comes after a discussion on the ethics of zoos, is that ownership of animals by humans came after the eating of the forbidden fruit, and led to the caging and eating of animals by humans. This links with the fetishisation of ownership, which is a theme of the film.

There are cameo appearances in the play by BBC journalist Kenneth Allsop and by Loach himself in the same scene outside Fortnum and Masons. Allsop is interviewing members of the public on whether they prefer working or spending money, when Loach interrupts him to say that his interviews are interfering with the picture that he is trying to film.

As in Loach's earlier work, Three Clear Sundays, an earlier Wednesday Play broadcast the previous April, songs are used both as part of the dialogue and as commentary on the plot. For example, in Fortnum and Masons, a salesman sings about the merits of a particular watch. In an earlier scene of Mavis's parents, a song describes them as fearful, boring and obedient. As with the breakaway scenes, there are songs that appear for no apparent reason, such as Aunty Mary.

== Cast ==
- Ken Jones as Arthur
- Maureen Ampleford as Emmy
- Charles Lamb as Dad
- Winifred Dennis as Mum
- Robert Dougall as newsreader
- Janie Booth as Mavis
- Hugh Paddick as house agent
- Joanna Dunham as Mrs Thurloe
- Edward de Souza as Mr Thurloe
- Ian Ellis as Mark
- Derek Royle as taxi driver
- Howell Evans as angry driver
- Alec Coleman as shaving man
- Kenneth Allsop as interviewer
- Fanny Carby as Connie
- Toni Palmer as Janet
