= The Rank and File (Play for Today) =

- Play for Today episode
- Episode no.: Series 1 Episode 21
- Directed by: Ken Loach
- Written by: Jim Allen
- Original air date: 20 May 1971

Episode chronology
← Previous "Orkney"	Next → "The Man In The Sidecar"

"The Rank and File" is the 21st episode of first season of the British BBC anthology TV series Play for Today. The episode was a television play that was originally broadcast on 20 May 1971. "The Rank and File" was written by Jim Allen, directed by Ken Loach and produced by Graeme McDonald. It is included in the Ken Loach at the BBC boxset released in 2011, although the recording is of unusually poor quality for a DVD release.

== Background ==
In 1970, an unofficial strike took place at the Pilkington Glass Works in St. Helens, Lancashire, initially after an error in wage packets but the strikers later demanded a wage rise to £25 per week. The cause was described in the New Statesman as 'the cumbersome structure of different bonus and shift payments which meant that men doing similar jobs took home different and unpredictable pay packets'. Six thousand workers went on strike for two months. The BBC insisted that the name of the company be changed from "Pilkington" to "Wilkinson", and the location moved from St. Helens to the Staffordshire Potteries. However, the film begins with an on-screen caption that reads, "A film based principally on events that took place in Lancashire in the Spring of 1970".

The Trotskyist dramatist Jim Allen visited the strikers to show support and showed them the film The Big Flame, which he had written and Ken Loach had directed. Jim Allen has given an account of how he was subsequently persuaded to write a similar script about the strike at Pilkington.

So, one old bloke said to me, "Will you write a film for us?" And I was really up to my neck in work, committed. I said, "I'm pressed for time." So this old fella said, "come to the toilet with me, I'll show you my 'war medals'." We got to the toilet and he whips his shirt off, and his back was lacerated, as if he'd been whipped by glass, and then he put his shirt back on. He said, "I've worked here all my life, never been on strike and I've been told that unless I scab, they'll take my pension away." Anyway, this fella refused to scab, and he finished up with no pension and he was sweeping up in a Co-Op shop in St. Helens. Well, that was moral blackmail. So, I said, "yes, of course, I'll write a script."

This man became the inspiration for the character Charlie in the film.

The strike took place near the end of Harold Wilson's first government. The unofficial strikes and student protests in France in May 1968 were influential amongst the left-wing in the UK, and there was a subsequent increase in strikes taken outside of the union framework, most notably the miners' strike of October 1969. The union at Pilkington, the General and Municipal Workers' Union, was strongly supportive of Wilson and did not support the strike launched by the glass workers in 1970.

Passed under the new government of Edward Heath, the Industrial Relations Act 1971 made such unofficial strikes illegal. This Act is mentioned towards the end of the film.

The Rank and File has numerous similarities to The Big Flame. As well as sharing the same director and playwright, the films also share most of the lead actors: Peter Kerrigan, Bill Dean, Tommy Summers and Joan Flood. As The Big Flame was the more popular film, The Rank and File has become overlooked.

== Plot ==
A family glassware company dominates the town. There have been no strikes in a hundred years, but sheet workers walk out over a pay discrepancy. When other grievances come to light, all six factories go on strike. The union, the General Municipal, does not support the strike. Eddie Marsden then sets up a Rank and File Strike Committee to organise the strike outside of the union, doing business such as organising pickets and collecting for a hardship fund. The Committee meets in a room above a pub with seven members: Les, Johnny, Eddie, Billy, Bert, Mike and Jerry. They befriend a journalist who was sent to cover the strike, even though he normally only covers gardening news.

Whilst Les is typing out a strike bulletin, a brick is thrown through the back window. Les fails to catch the perpetrators.

During the next committee meeting, they receive a phone call from the journalist to inform them that the General Municipal has secretly accepted a £3, (12%) pay rise, which is lower than the Committee was demanding. When the General Municipal's leader Holtby arrives to address the meeting, he is booed and pelted with stones, and has to be given a police escort away. A vote by show of hands is passed for the strike to continue. Holtby then tells the media that the Communist Party have infiltrated the workforce, but the workers deny this when asked by journalists.

Many strikers are falling behind with rent and evicted from their homes. A female striker is shown sleeping with her baby on the street. She is afraid that the baby will be taken away if she presents herself to a charity or to a welfare office. A march takes place to the union headquarters to demand appropriation of the union's hardship fund. After some marchers (including Les) are arrested, the others discover an old union banner from the 1926 General Strike and carry on marching with it. Les's wife subsequently leaves him, but agrees to give the typewriter for the strike bulletins to Eddie.

A group of men walk back to work under police escort. They are called scabs (a term that is extremely offensive in some parts of England) and spat at, before a scuffle between pickets and police. Shortly afterwards, Johnny takes a taxi to Wood Street, but the taxi driver takes an unexpected term and ignores instructions. When Johnny gets out, he is beaten up by hired muscle. The other members of the committee wait for Johnny at the hospital, and then mock him when he emerges in bandages.

The Trades Union Congress invites the Committee to negotiate on the strike in London. As the strike is taking its toll on the committee both financially and physically, they decided to enter negotiations. Eddie is elected to attend the meeting and obtain written confirmation of the promises made by the General Municipal and the TUC. They return with a signed document which states that there will be no victimisation once the men return to work. The strike is then called off.

Once back at work, the agreement is not honoured. Eddie is followed around by the foreman and production manager constantly. The victimised leaders return to London to discuss the agreement signed with the General Electric and TUC, but the request for a meeting is denied. A new unofficial strike is then called, but collapses after three days. Eddie, Billy and other members of the Committee are sacked and blacklisted. Charlie is allowed to keep his job, but loses his pension rights and his wage is reduced to the level of an apprentice.

The film ends with Eddie critiquing the Industrial Relations Act 1971 for forbidding unofficial strikes. He quotes Trotsky's vision of hope that the young will go on to make a brighter future.

== Cast ==
- Peter Kerrigan as Eddie
- Billy Dean as Billy
- Tommy Summers as Tommy
- Joan Flood as Joan
- Johnny Gee as Johnny
- Mike Hayden as Mike
- Bert King as Bert
- Neville Smith as Jerry
- Ernie Mack as Hagan
- Michael Forrest as Holtby
- Charlie Barlow as Charlie
- Bernard Atha as personnel officer

== Evaluation ==
The film is generally considered to be one of the weaker collaborations between Allen and Loach, and the two men have both expressed their reservations about the picture. Loach has said that the film is too specific to the events of the Pilkington strike, which were quickly forgotten. Allen has questioned whether his script was a success.

Having written plays like "The Rank and File" about collective action, the Pilkington Glass Strike, I think that if you don't take an individual you lose the thread. The Lump is expressed in individuals. It's strong men hustling, fighting. "The Rank and File" was written in three weeks, and had to be done the way it was. The trouble was the imagination limps behind the reality behind Pilkington... If you get too didactic, politically or otherwise, as I probably did in "The Rank and File", it can be a lantern lecture. To express political ideas you need to fuse the individual and the collective... You should allow objective reality to filter through the subjective.

As well as being attacked by right-wing newspapers, the film is also criticised by many on the political left for its portrayal of trade unions. A member of the Communist Party of Great Britain suggested that the film was put out by the BBC to attack trade unions as bureaucratic and dominated by Stalinists.

John Williams described the film as "an unashamedly partial work that shows both the strengths and weaknesses of a politically committed approach to art, in that those characters who have Allen's sympathy are convincingly written and portrayed, while others are often little more than pantomime villains". He writes that it differs from The Big Flame in that the latter contains characters who theorise the strike in Marxist terms and portrays a dispute with far-reaching consequences, whereas "The Rank and File" is more constrained by the facts of the Pilkington case, which was a brief strike led by workers who were not aligned with any Marxist group. Williams feels that the Trotsky quote at the end of the film "seems clumsily inserted, as if Allen and Loach needed to add a wider, revolutionary aspect to the play". He also suggests that the two films were broadcast by the BBC at a time when many of those in the Plays department held similar politics to Allen and Loach.

Jacob Leigh wrote that "The Rank and File" concentrates more than The Big Flame on the collective experiences of the strikers, by showing cases in which strikers are attacked, arrested and deserted by their spouses.

The scene in which Charlie is "given a chance to mend his ways" is analysed by Leigh.

"The film proposes that the employers do not care about Charlie: they have exploited him all his life and continue to do so, yet he takes his job back. Apart from one shot of the personnel officer, Loach films this scene with a close-up of Charlie: his face is haggard and he appears worn out: but he can only acquiesce. Throughout the shot, the personnel officer's head is on the left side of the frame, taking up about a quarter of the framed space. In the foreground, and close in, is Charlie's gloomy face: cracked glasses perched on his nose, eyes tired, greying hair greased back. "Right, thank you sir," he says. The scene ends with a freeze-frame on his face: he is one of the casualties of the strike."
