= The Big Flame =

- The Wednesday Play episode
- Episode no.: Season 8 Episode 19
- Directed by: Ken Loach
- Written by: Jim Allen
- Editing by: Roy Watts
- Original air date: 19 February 1969
- Running time: 85 mins

"The Big Flame" is a 1969 BBC television play by socialist playwright Jim Allen, produced by Tony Garnett and directed by Ken Loach. The play tells the story of 10,000 dockworkers occupying the Liverpool docks in a "work-in". Filmed in a gritty, realistic drama documentary style, it was first broadcast on 19 February 1969 on BBC1, at a time when unemployment was rising in Britain. The play was shown in the BBC's The Wednesday Play anthology strand, which was noted for tackling social issues.

Following its broadcast, Mary Whitehouse, president of the National Viewers' and Listeners' Association, wrote to both Prime Minister Harold Wilson and Leader of the Opposition Edward Heath, demanding that they review the charter of the BBC in light of its transmission of "a blueprint for the communist takeover of the docks." Unofficial strikes were the subject of political debate at the time, and the government had proposed a ban on unofficial strikes the previous month in the paper In Place of Strife. The last broadcast was on 26 August 1971.

The name of the play was later used by a revolutionary socialist organisation founded in Liverpool in 1970.

Jim Allen and Ken Loach, along with many of the same cast, also collaborated on the 1971 film The Rank and File. The two films have been noted as being similar in many ways.

In September 2011, the play was released on DVD as part of the 6-disc box set, Ken Loach at the BBC.

== Cast ==
- Norman Rossington as Danny Fowler
- Godfrey Quigley as Jack Regan
- Peter Kerrigan as Peter Conner
- Ken Jones as Freddi Grierson
- Dan Stephens as Joe Ryan
- Tom Summers as Alec Murphy
- Meredith Edwards as Logan
- Michael Forrest as Garfield
- John Riley as Bruno
- Harold Kinsella as Andy Fowler
- Joan Flood as Liz Fowler
- Ron Davies as Steve Fowler
- Terrence Flood as Liz Fowler's Son
- Roland MacLeod as Mr. Weldon
- Gerald Young as The Fudge
- Phillip Ross as Inspector (as Philip Ross)
- Griffith Davies as O'Neill
- Neville Smith as Strike committee member
- Jerry Edwards as Strike committee member
- Joe Cubbin as Strike committee member
- Pat Gillon as Strike committee member
- Jimmy Goldbourn as Strike committee member
- Les McGrae as Strike committee member
- Jimmy Campbell as Strike committee member
- Stephen Porter as Strike committee member
- John Gee as Clerk
- Lily Quinn as Neighbour
- Joyce Quadrio as Neighbour
- Laurie Asprey as Reporter
- Ken Campbell as Reporter (as Kenneth Campbell)
- Mike Nally as TV Interviewer
- Derek Hunt as TV Interviewer
- Timothy Carlton as Officer
- Bill Dean as Landlord (as Billy Dean)
- Michael Lynch as Captain
- Edwin Brown as Policeman
- J.A. Judson as Court official (as J.A. Jackson)
- Harry Hudson as Policeman
- Jim West as Court official
- Tom West as Court official
- Len Annet as Docker
- Syll Conn as Docker
- Paddy Joyce as Docker
- Charlie Barlow as Docker
- Austin Fearns as Docker
- Joey Kaye as Docker
- Joseph Kerwin as Docker
- Alban Milligan as Docker
- Joe Mooney as Docker
- Bert King as Docker
- Louis Mooney as Docker
- Frank O'Rourke as Docker
- Joe Quadrio as Docker
- Bobby Shack as Docker
- Joey Summers as Docker (as Joe Summers)
- Gerald Richardson as Docker
- Sammy Sharples as Docker
- John Summers as Docker

== See also ==
- Upper Clyde Shipbuilders - a famous work-in at the shipyards on the River Clyde, Scotland, in 1971
- 1971 Harco work-in - a famous work-in by steelworkers in Campbelltown, New South Wales, Australia, in 1971
- Workers' self-management
