= Family Life (1971 British film) =

1971 British film by Ken Loach

- Directed by: Ken Loach
- Screenplay by: David Mercer
- Based on: TV play Two Minds by David Mercer
- Produced by: Tony Garnett
- Starring: Sandy Ratcliff; Malcolm Tierney; Grace Cave
- Cinematography: Charles Stewart
- Edited by: Roy Watts
- Music by: Marc Wilkinson
- Production companies: Anglo-EMI; Kestrel Films
- Distributed by: MGM-EMI
- Release dates: 2 December 1971 (UK); 5 October 1972 (USA)
- Running time: 108 minutes
- Country: United Kingdom
- Language: English
- Budget: £180,000
- Box office: $1,827,374SEK ($291,648USD)

Family Life (US: Wednesday's Child) is a 1971 British drama film directed by Ken Loach and starring Sandy Ratcliff, Malcolm Tierney and Grace Cave. The screenplay was by David Mercer. It is a remake of In Two Minds, an episode of the BBC's Wednesday Play series first transmitted by the BBC in March 1967, which was also written by Mercer and directed by Loach.

== Plot ==
A young woman, Janice, is living with her conservative, working-class parents, who become concerned at her rebellious behaviour, and are shocked when she becomes pregnant. At a time when pregnancy when unmarried was widely considered shameful, they insist she has an abortion, but this has terrible emotional and mental effects on her. They constantly berate her for her behaviour, even when they visit her in hospital.

== Cast ==
- Sandy Ratcliff as Janice Baildon
- Bill Dean as Mr. Baildon
- Grace Cave as Mrs. Baildon
- Malcolm Tierney as Tim
- Hilary Martyn as Barbara Baildon
- Michael Riddall as Dr. Donaldson
- Alan MacNaughtan as Mr. Caswell
- Johnny Gee as man in the garden

== Production ==
=== Development and writing ===
Tony Garnett became interested in the work of psychiatrist R. D. Laing as a member of his family suffered from mental illness. He arranged for David Mercer to write a screenplay. It resulted in the play Two Minds which Garnett said was inspired by the story of Julie, a case in Laing's 1960 book The Divided Self. "I regretted later it might be seen as scapegoating the mother," wrote Garnett. Garnett wanted Roy Battersby to direct but he was unavailable so he went with Ken Loach.

The production was a success but Garnett said the fate and experience of his family member with the psychiatric profession "kept nagging away at me" so he decided to turn it into a film. Mercer was reluctant as "he rightly felt he had done the subject" but he was eventually persuaded. Garnett says Loach "didn't see the point but was easier to persuade. Directors always want to work in cinema."

"It's the only subject where I've insisted we had two bites at the cherry, for my own personal reasons," said Garnett. "It was so important to me, to do with a woman in my life and a painful time. Although it wasn't necessarily a sensible thing to do, it was almost an obsession in me to try to understand what had gone on."

Garnett claimed Mercer's "screenplay was barely adequate. It was lazy, perhaps because his heart wasn't in it. I wanted to do more work on it with him. He was reluctant. I probably should have called it a day then. With David on strike, but naturally reluctant to allow me to rewrite it, we had an insecure basis for a film. It was probably my fault for pressing him into it." However the producer says the movie was rescued by Loach who "gave a sense that we were witnessing life rather than actors doing their thing."

=== Financing ===
Half the budget was provided by the National Film Finance Corporation, who had financed the script; the other half came from Nat Cohen and Anglo-EMI, who had previously financed successful films from Ken Loach (Poor Cow) and Garnett (The Body). Garnett wrote in his memoirs that when he pitched the project to Cohen, the executive summarised the story as "So, a mad girl goes into a mental hospital and goes madder. An unhappy ending. No laughs, no sex." He then said "You and Ken, you know, we could make a lot of money with you. If you weren't such a bunch of bloody communists." Although Garnett and Loach wanted to use an unknown in the lead, Cohen gave the money. (Loach thought the film only got financed because the lead was a 19 year old girl.)

=== Casting ===
Casting mixed professionals with amateurs. The mother was played by a suburban housewife and the psychiatrist by a real psychiatrist. Changes from the original included introducing a psychiatrist character and a boyfriend for the lead.

=== Filming ===
There were clashes during filming as Mercer wanted his script filmed to the letter while Loach encouraged improvisation.

=== Post-production ===
During editing, Loach was involved in a car accident that injured him and resulted in the death of his mother in law and five-year-old son.

== Release ==
The film was screened at the New York Film Festival on 3 October 1972.

== Reception ==
=== Box office ===
Garnett said the film "did little business, as Nat had predicted, although long afterwards he had the grace to admit it was released and marketed badly. I don't think anyone knew how to sell it or even knew what it was really about." The film was very successful in France, however, where Laing's teachings were popular. Loach's biographer says the film was a commercial failure and prevented him making a feature for several years.

=== Critical reception ===
The Monthly Film Bulletin wrote: "With its relentless cinéma-vérité style, its lack of conventionally dramatic incident, and its all too recognisable characters, Ken Loach's Family Life is so harrowing in its immediate impact and so transparently inspired by the most passionate humanitarian concern that it seems positively unfeeling to cavil at some of its more specious arguments. Yet on reflection it becomes clear that, unless the film is to be classified as one of those 'women's weepies' which its techniques appear to be opposing, the tears one copiously sheds at its conclusion must go beyond a cathartic self-indulgence."

The Evening Standard called it "extraordinary".

Pauline Kael wrote "There are a few striking performances in the simulations of documentary footage. If you're not convinced by the Laing thesis, though, you may get very impatient."

Variety called it "disturbing and provocative."

Filmink called it "a masterpiece, a remarkable, emotionally devastating work that’s gutsier than anything Bryan Forbes made at EMI."

== Awards ==
=== Won ===
- 1972 Berlin International Film Festival:
  - FIPRESCI Prize – Forum of New Film: Ken Loach
  - Interfilm Award – Forum of New Cinema: Ken Loach
  - OCIC Award – Forum of New Film: Ken Loach
- French Syndicate of Cinema Critics 1974:
  - Critics Award – Best Foreign Film: Ken Loach (UK)
- Sydney Film Festival 2003:
  - Audience Award – Best Feature-Length Fiction Film: Ken Loach

=== Nominated ===
- BAFTA Awards 1973:
  - UN Award – Best Film

== Notes ==
- Garnett, Tony (2016). The Day the Music Died : A Memoir. Constable. ISBN 9781472122735.
- Hayward, Anthony (2004). Which Side Are You On? : Ken Loach and His Films. Bloomsbury.
