= Hidden Agenda (1990 film) =

1990 British film by Ken Loach

- Theatrical release poster
- Directed by: Ken Loach
- Written by: Jim Allen
- Produced by: Eric Fellner
- Starring: Frances McDormand; Brian Cox; Brad Dourif; Mai Zetterling; John Benfield; Des McAleer; Jim Norton; Maurice Roëves
- Cinematography: Clive Tickner
- Edited by: Jonathan Morris
- Music by: Stewart Copeland
- Distributed by: Hemdale Film Corporation
- Release date: 21 November 1990
- Running time: 108 minutes
- Country: United Kingdom
- Language: English
- Budget: £3 million
- Box office: $1,030,938

Hidden Agenda is a 1990 political thriller film directed by Ken Loach with a screenplay by Jim Allen. The film stars Frances McDormand, Brian Cox, Brad Dourif, Maurice Roëves, Ian McElhinney, Mai Zetterling and Michelle Fairley. The plot follows the investigation of a killing in Northern Ireland by British security forces.

== Plot ==
The film begins with a quote from British Prime Minister Margaret Thatcher insisting that Northern Ireland is part of Britain. It ends with one from a former British intelligence agent, stating, "There are two laws running this country: one for the security forces and the other for the rest of us."

In Northern Ireland, an Orange march is held on The Twelfth, and an audio tape is handed to Paul Sullivan (Dourif), an American human rights lawyer and activist. When Sullivan arranges to meet the person who made the tape, he is assassinated by a death squad. The gunmen retrieve the tape from Sullivan's body. It subsequently becomes clear that the killers are from the British security services.

British police investigator Peter Kerrigan (Cox), with the help of Sullivan's assistant, Ingrid Jessner (McDormand), investigates the death. The investigation leads them to Captain Harris, an ex-army intelligence officer now in hiding, who created the tape. He reveals it was a recording of senior military leaders and Conservative Party politicians discussing how they subverted democracy to facilitate Margaret Thatcher's rise to power.

Harris gives a copy of the tape to Jessner, after which British security forces kill Harris and blame his death on the IRA. Kerrigan is blackmailed into silence. Jessner has the tape, but without Harris to authenticate it, the recording is dismissed as a forgery.

== Cast ==
- Frances McDormand as Ingrid Jessner
- Brian Cox as Peter Kerrigan
- Brad Dourif as Paul Sullivan
- Maurice Roëves as Captain Harris
- Ian McElhinney as Jack Cunningham
- Jim Norton as Brodie
- Mai Zetterling as Moa
- Michelle Fairley as Teresa Doyle

The film also features a cameo by the socialist politician John McDonnell as 'Labour MP'.

== Production ==
The production was originally set up at Columbia Pictures in 1987, when David Puttnam ran the studio. After Puttnam was ousted, Loach had to find new financial backing, and eventually found it with John Daly who ran Hemdale Film Corporation.

== Soundtrack ==
- Joe McDonnell - Written by Brian Warfield - Re-arranged by Ron Kavana - Performed by Ron Kavana and Terry Woods
- Young Ned of the Hill - Written and performed by Ron Kavana and Terry Woods

== Reception ==
=== Critical response ===
Hidden Agenda was praised for its honesty and complexity, as well as its resonance. It was criticised for portraying the Troubles as an adjunct to British rather than Irish politics.

Roger Ebert gave the film 3 stars out of 4, describing it as "lacerating" and a "superior thriller", although he noted that "for Americans, it works more as a thriller than as political polemic".

Rotten Tomatoes retrospectively collected 21 reviews, amassing an approval rating of 86%, with an average rating of 6.9/10.

=== Box office ===
The film made £141,050 in the UK.

=== Awards ===
Hidden Agenda won the Jury Prize at the 1990 Cannes Film Festival and was nominated for Best European Film at the Goya Awards. At the Festival press conference, the Northern Irish critic Alexander Walker publicly denounced the film as IRA propaganda.
