= Jim Allen (playwright) =

English playwright (1926–1999)

- Born: James Allen; 7 October 1926; Miles Platting, Manchester, England
- Died: 24 June 1999 (aged 72); Middleton, Greater Manchester, England
- Occupations: Playwright, builder's labourer, fireman (British Merchant Navy), miner
- Writing career
- Genres: Drama, fiction, screenplays
- Notable works: Coronation Street (1965–67); The Big Flame (1969), The Rank and File (1971); Days of Hope (1975); The Spongers (1978); Perdition (1987); Hidden Agenda (1990); Raining Stones (1993); Land and Freedom (1995)

James Allen (7 October 1926 – 24 June 1999) was an English socialist playwright, best known for his collaborations with Ken Loach.

== Early life ==
Allen was born in the Miles Platting area of Manchester, Lancashire, on 7 October 1926, the second child of Kitty and Jack Allen, Roman Catholics of Irish descent. At the outbreak of World War II in 1939, Allen left school at the age of 13 to work in a wire factory. He had various jobs during the war, before being called up into the Army in 1944. He joined the Seaforth Highlanders, and served with the British occupation forces in Germany. After leaving the Army in 1947, he worked at a variety of jobs, including a builder's labourer, a fireman in the Merchant Navy, and a miner at Bradford Colliery in Bradford, Manchester.

== Politics ==
During his military service, Allen was imprisoned for assault and a fellow inmate introduced him to the ideals of socialism. Allen was a passionate socialist for the rest of his life, although he detested Stalinism and refused to be associated with the Communist Party of Great Britain. In 1958, he joined the Socialist Labour League (SLL), the forerunner of the Workers' Revolutionary Party (WRP) led by Gerry Healy, a small group then pursuing entryist tactics within the Labour Party. The SLL objected to the close association between the CPGB and the National Union of Mineworkers, and Allen was a prominent campaigner for the SLL. In 1962, the Labour Party declared the SLL a "proscribed organisation", leading to Allen's expulsion from the party. He subsequently resigned his membership of the SLL, but did not join any other party.

== Writing career ==
Allen began to write during his time as a miner. In 1958, he was involved in the launch and publication of The Miner, which actively recruited for the SLL. The proscription of the SLL, together with the closed shop system of the time, made it impossible for him to find work in the mining or building trades, and he decided to adopt writing as a full-time profession. In 1964, he submitted a script to Granada Television, and was taken on as a scriptwriter for the soap opera Coronation Street (1965–67), a series for which he had little sympathy. His later play, The Talking Head (1969), recounts the experience of a talented writer driven to a nervous breakdown by the pressure of "episode delivery dates".

Allen's first play, The Hard Word (1966), directed by Ridley Scott, was broadcast as part of the Thirty-Minute Theatre series on BBC 2. It was followed by The Lump (1967), the first fictional work directed by Jack Gold, who had begun his career on documentaries, and broadcast as part of The Wednesday Play drama anthology series. Both plays were based on his experiences in the building trade, and The Lump features an activist worker who frequently quotes Lenin and Jack London, establishing the political nature of Allen's work which was to continue throughout his career.

Allen was introduced to Ken Loach in 1967 by Loach's regular collaborator at the time, producer Tony Garnett, who had produced The Lump. The first of Allen's plays to be directed by Loach was The Big Flame (1969), again for The Wednesday Play series. The play depicts a strike among the dockers of Liverpool, led by a Trotskyite docker against the wishes of the established union; the strike is violently broken by the army and police.

In 1975, Allen wrote, Garnett produced, and Loach directed Days of Hope, Allen's best-known work. A serial of four episodes, it tells the story of the British Labour movement between the Great War in 1916 and the General Strike of 1926. The series' depiction of the British Army was the subject of much hostile criticism in the press at the time.

Allen also wrote five plays (The Rank and File (1971), A Choice of Evils (1977), The Spongers (1978), United Kingdom (1981) and Willie's Last Stand (1982)) for the BBC's Play for Today drama series, and several episodes of the Granada series Crown Court (1975–76).

Allen and Loach's most controversial project was Allen's stage play, Perdition. Presented as a courtroom drama, the play dealt with an allegation of collaboration between Hungarian Zionists and the Nazis during the Holocaust. At the time, Allen said, "Without any undue humility, I'm saying this is the most lethal attack on Zionism ever written, because it touches at the heart of the greatest abiding myth of modern history, the Holocaust... privileged Jewish leaders collaborated in the extermination of their own kind in order to help bring about a Zionist state, Israel." The play was due to open at the Royal Court Theatre in January 1987, but was cancelled 36 hours before the opening night. Lord Goodman wrote in the Evening Standard on 23 January 1987: "Mr Jim Allen's description of the Holocaust can claim a high place in the table of classic anti-Semitism." The script was read in public at the Edinburgh Festival the following August, but was not produced as a stage play until 1999 in a much revised form.

With Loach as director, Allen wrote the screenplays for three feature-length films: Hidden Agenda (1990), which portrays the murder of an American civil rights activist in Belfast, Raining Stones (1993), a kitchen-sink tragicomedy set in Middleton, near Manchester, and, Allen's final dramatic work, Land and Freedom (1995), telling the story of an idealistic young Communist from Liverpool who joins the Government forces in the Spanish Civil War.

== Death ==
Allen was diagnosed with cancer in February 1999, and died the following June.

== Filmography ==
=== Television ===
- Coronation Street (36 episodes, 2 episodes co-written with John Finch 22 March 1965 – 15 May 1967)
- Thirty Minute Theatre (2 episodes; "The Hard Word" (1966), "The Punchy and Fairy" (1973))
- The Wednesday Play (2 episodes; "The Lump" (1967), "The Big Flame" (1969))
- The Gamblers (1 episode, "The Man Beneath" (1967))
- Half Hour Story (1 episode, "The Pub Fighter" (1968))
- ITV Sunday Night Theatre (1 episode, "The Talking Head" (1969))
- Play For Today (5 episodes; "The Rank and File" (1971), "A Choice of Evils" (1977), "The Spongers" (1978), "United Kingdom" (1981), "Willie's Last Stand" (1982))
- Days of Hope (1975 serial)
- Crown Court (7 episodes; "The Extremist (Parts 1-3)" (1975), "Tell the Truth and Shame the Devil (Part 1)" (1975), "Ends and Means (Part 1)" (1975), "Incorrigible Rogue" (1976), "Those in Peril (Part 1)" (1976))
- The Gathering Seed (September – October 1983)

=== Film ===
- Hidden Agenda (1990)
- Raining Stones (1993)
- Land and Freedom (1995)

=== Stage ===
- Perdition (1987)

== Awards ==
- 1975 Broadcasting Press Guild – Days of Hope
- 1978 Broadcasting Press Guild – The Spongers
- 1978 Prix Italia, British Broadcasting Corporation – The Spongers
- 1981 Broadcasting Press Guild – United Kingdom
- 1990 Winner, Special Jury Prize, Cannes Film Festival – Hidden Agenda
- 1993 Evening Standard British Film Award – Raining Stones
- 1993 Winner, Special Jury Prize, Cannes Film Festival – Raining Stones
- 1995 Winner, International Critics Prize, Ecumenical Jury Prize, Cannes Film Festival – Land and Freedom

== Sources ==
- Slaughter, Barbara (11 August 1999). "Jim Allen: A lifetime's commitment to historical truth (Obituary)". World Socialist Web Site.
