= Roland Joffé =

English film director and producer (born 1945)

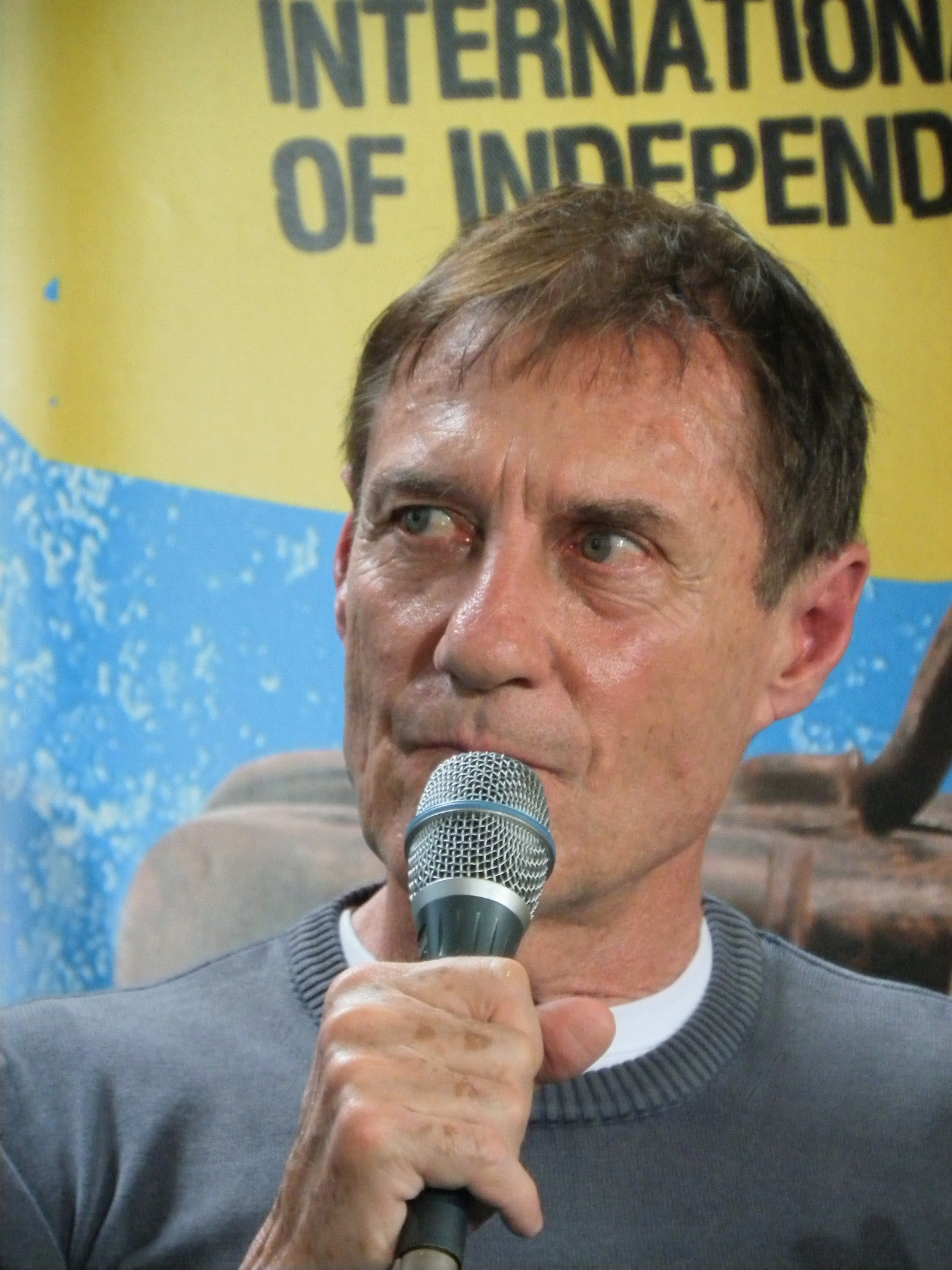
- Joffé in 2012
- Born: 17 November 1945 (age 80); London, England
- Education: Lycée Français Charles de Gaulle; Carmel College, Oxfordshire
- Alma mater: University of Manchester
- Occupations: Film director, producer, screenwriter
- Years active: 1960–present
- Spouse: Jane Lapotaire (m. 1974; div. 1980)
- Children: Rowan Joffé; Nathalie Lunghi

Roland Joffé (/ˈdʒɒfeɪ/; born 17 November 1945) is an English film and television director, producer and screenwriter. He is known for directing the critically-acclaimed films The Killing Fields (1984) and The Mission (1986), both of which earned him Academy Award nominations for Best Director, and the latter winning the Palme d'Or at the 1986 Cannes Film Festival.

Joffé began his career in television, his early credits including episodes of Coronation Street and an adaptation of The Stars Look Down for Granada. He gained a reputation for hard-hitting political stories with the series Bill Brand and factual dramas for Play for Today. In the late 1980s, he co-founded the production company Lightmotive with Ben Myron.

== Early life and education ==
Joffé was born in London to a family of French and Jewish origin. Around 1950, Roland's father Mark Joffé began a relationship with the daughter of Jacob Epstein and Kathleen Garman, Esther Garman, who helped raise Roland. After Esther's suicide in 1954, Roland lived with her parents. Portraits of Roland as a child by Jacob Epstein and Esther's brother Theodore Garman are part of the Garman Ryan Collection at The New Art Gallery Walsall.

Joffé was educated at two independent schools: the Lycée Français Charles de Gaulle in London, and Carmel College in Wallingford, Oxfordshire, which was Europe's only Jewish boarding school, until it closed in 1997. He completed his formal education at the University of Manchester.

== Career ==
=== TV director ===
After university, Joffé joined Granada Television as a trainee director in 1973, where he directed episodes of Coronation Street, Sam, The Stars Look Down, Crown Court, Bill Brand, and Headmaster.

In 1977, producer Tony Garnett was commissioned by the BBC to direct the play The Spongers within BBCs Play for Today series. He informed the BBC drama department that he wanted to hire Roland Joffé as director, but was told that Joffé did not possess BBC clearance and was regarded a "security risk" (see: "Christmas tree" files). The reason was that Joffé had attended some Workers Revolutionary Party meetings in the early 1970s, although he never became a party member. He explained around 1988: "I was very interested in politics at that time. But I was interested in what all the political parties were doing, not just the WRP, and I was never actively involved." Only after Garnett threatened he would "go public", was the veto on Joffé's appointment withdrawn. The Spongers won the prestigious Prix Italia award.

Joffé also directed an episode in BBC's Second City Firsts in 1977 and later directed two more plays for Play for Today: The Legion Hall Bombing (1979) and United Kingdom (1981). In 1979, he directed the TV play No, Mama, No by Verity Bargate for the ITV Playhouse series, and in 1980 he made a version of 17th century dramatist John Ford's play 'Tis Pity She's a Whore as a TV film for the BBC.

=== Film director ===
Roland Joffé's first two feature films (The Killing Fields, 1984, and The Mission, 1986) each garnered him an Academy Award nomination for Best Director. Joffé worked closely with producer David Puttnam on each film. The Killing Fields detailed the friendship of two men, an American journalist for The New York Times, and his translator, a prisoner of the Khmer Rouge in Communist Cambodia. It won three Academy Awards (for Best Supporting Actor, Best Cinematography, and Best Film Editing) and was nominated for four more (including Best Picture and Best Director). The Mission was a story of conflict between Jesuit missionaries in South America, who were trying to convert the Guaraní Indians, and the Portuguese and Spanish colonisers, who wanted to enslave the natives. In an interview with Thomas Bird, Joffé says of The Mission, "The Indians are innocent. The film is about what happens in the world... what that innocence brings out in us. You would sit in a cinema in New York, or in Tokyo, or Paris, and for that point of time you would be joined with your companions on this planet. You would come out with a real sense of a network.". The film won the Palme d'Or and Technical Grand Jury Prize at the 1986 Cannes Film Festival. It achieved six Academy Awards nominations—including for Best Picture, Best Director, and Ennio Morricone's acclaimed Best Original Score—and won one, for Best Cinematography.

In 1993, he produced and partially directed a big budget adaptation of the video game Super Mario Bros.. The film struggled to make back its budget. His 1995 adaptation of The Scarlet Letter was a critical and financial disaster, and his 2007 horror film Captivity drew controversy with its advertising billboards, widely regarded as exploitative and misogynistic. He received Razzie Nominations for Worst Director for The Scarlet Letter and Captivity.

His 2011 release, There Be Dragons, garnered press attention as it dealt with the Catholic organisation Opus Dei. A movie about faith and forgiveness, There Be Dragons is a project that Joffé says has a message he's proud to say on film. In an interview with CBN.com, he stated, "I have a very deep emotional investment in this film. I feel that I really want to stand behind what it says to us as human beings."

In 2013, Joffé directed the internationally co-produced historical adventure film, The Lovers.

== Personal life ==
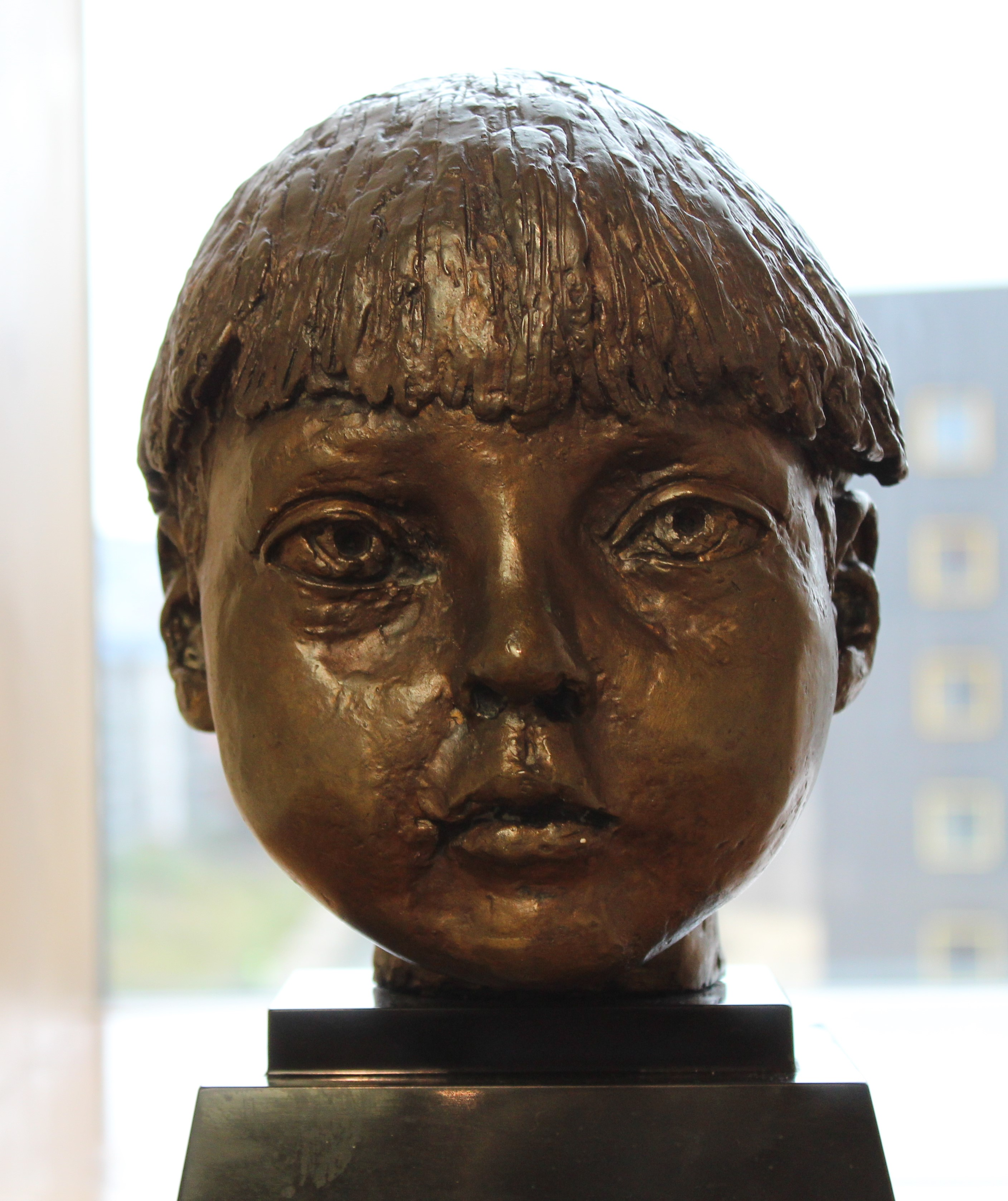
Roland Joffé by Jacob Epstein, c. 1949

From 1974 to 1980, Joffé was married to actress Jane Lapotaire; they have a son, screenwriter and director Rowan Joffé (b. 1973). Later, he and actress Cherie Lunghi were in a longterm relationship; they have a daughter, actor Nathalie Lunghi (b. 1986).

Joffé is a board member of the nonprofit organization Operation USA. He was the official patron of the 2011 Cambodia Volleyball World Cup held from 23 to 29 July at the National Olympic Stadium in Phnom Penh. Roland Joffé lives in Malta and is an active member of the team organising the Valletta Film Festival.

Religiously, Joffé has described himself as a "wobbly agnostic".

== Filmography ==
=== Film ===
Year	Title	Director	Writer	Producer
1984	The Killing Fields	Yes	No	No
1986	The Mission	Yes	No	No
1989	Fat Man and Little Boy	Yes	Yes	No
1992	City of Joy	Yes	No	No
1993	Super Mario Bros.	No	No	Yes
1995	The Scarlet Letter	Yes	No	Yes
1998	Goodbye Lover	Yes	No	No
2000	Vatel	Yes	No	Yes
2000	Waterproof	No	No	Yes
2007	Captivity	Yes	No	No
2008	You and I	Yes	No	No
2011	There Be Dragons	Yes	Yes	Yes
2013	The Lovers	Yes	Yes	No
2017	The Forgiven	Yes	Yes	Yes
TBA	November 1963	Yes	No	No

Executive producer

- Blood on the Crown (2021)

=== Television ===
Year	Title	Notes
1973–74	Coronation Street	4 episodes
1974–75	Sam	4 episodes
1975	The Stars Look Down	6 episodes
1976	Crown Court	4 episodes
1976	Bill Brand	5 episodes
1977	Headmaster	3 episodes
1977	Second City Firsts	1 episode
1978	The Spongers	
1978	Play for Today	Episode: "The Legion Hall Bombing"
1979	No, Mama, No	
1980	'Tis Pity She's a Whore	
1981	Play for Today	Episode: "United Kingdom"
2002	Undressed	1 episode
2015	Texas Rising	5 episodes
2017	Sun Records	8 episodes
2019	A Lover Scorned	Television film
2026	The Gray House	8 episodes

== Awards and nominations ==
Award	Year	Category	Nominated work	Result
Prix Italia	1978		The Spongers	
Academy Awards	1985	Best Director	The Killing Fields	Nominated
Academy Awards	1987	Best Director	The Mission	Nominated
Golden Globe Awards	1985	Best Director	The Killing Fields	Nominated
Golden Globe Awards	1987	Best Director	The Mission	Nominated
Cannes Film Festival	1986	Palme d'Or	The Mission	Won
Cannes Film Festival	1986	Technical Grand Prize	The Mission	Won
British Academy of Film and Television Arts	1985	Best Direction	The Killing Fields	Nominated
British Academy of Film and Television Arts	1987	Best Direction	The Mission	Nominated
British Academy of Film and Television Arts	1987	Best Film	The Mission	Nominated
Berlin International Film Festival	1990	Golden Bear	Fat Man and Little Boy	Nominated
Golden Raspberry Awards	1996	Worst Picture	The Scarlet Letter	Nominated
Golden Raspberry Awards	1996	Worst Prequel, Remake, Rip-off or Sequel	The Scarlet Letter	Won
Golden Raspberry Awards	1996	Worst Director	The Scarlet Letter	Nominated
Golden Raspberry Awards	2008	Worst Director	Captivity	Nominated

Directed Academy Award performances
Under Joffé's direction, these actors have received Academy Award nominations (and one win) for their performances in their respective roles.

Year	Performer	Film	Result
Academy Award for Best Actor
1985	Sam Waterston	The Killing Fields	Nominated
Academy Award for Best Supporting Actor
1985	Haing S. Ngor	The Killing Fields	Won

== See also ==
- List of Academy Award winners and nominees from Great Britain
