= Black Jack (1979 film) =

1979 British film by Ken Loach

- Video cover
- Directed by: Ken Loach
- Written by: Ken Loach
- Based on: a novel by Leon Garfield
- Produced by: Tony Garnett
- Starring: Stephen Hirst; Louise Cooper; Jean Franval; Phil Askham; Pat Wallis
- Cinematography: Chris Menges
- Edited by: Bill Shapter
- Music by: Bob Pegg
- Production companies: Kestrel Films; National Film Finance Consortium
- Distributed by: Enterprise (theatrical); BFI Video
- Release dates: 10 September 1979 (Toronto International Film Festival); 29 September 1979 (New York Film Festival)
- Running time: 110 minutes
- Country: United Kingdom
- Language: English
- Budget: ~£450,000

Black Jack is a 1979 British period adventure drama film directed by Ken Loach and based on the Leon Garfield novel. It is set in Yorkshire in 1750 and follows a young boy, Tolly, and his adventures with a large French man, the Black Jack of the title, and Belle, a young English girl. It was awarded the Critics' Award at the Cannes Film Festival (1979).

== Cast ==
- Stephen Hirst as Tolly
- Louise Cooper as Belle
- Jean Franval as Jack "Black Jack"
- Packie Manus Byrne as Dr. Carmody
- Andrew Bennett as Hatch
- John Young as Dr. Hunter
- William Moore as Mr. Carter
- Doreen Mantle as Mrs. Carter
- Russell Waters as Dr. Jones
- Malcolm Dixon as Tom Thumb's Army
- Mike Edmonds as Tom Thumb's Army
- David Rappaport as Tom Thumb's Army
- Tiny Ross as Tom Thumb's Army

== Production ==
=== Financing ===
Black Jack was the first film investment by Goldcrest Pictures, who provided £11,250 for initial development. Goldcrest recouped this when the film went into production. The bulk of financing came from the National Film Finance Corporation.

=== Filming ===
The film was shot on location in North Yorkshire, England.

== Release ==
=== Awards ===
Black Jack won the FIPRESCI Award at the 1979 Cannes Film Festival. The film was also nominated for the "Gold Hugo" at the 1979 Chicago International Film Festival.

== Notes ==
- Eberts, Jake; Illott, Terry (1990). My Indecision is Final. Faber and Faber.
