= Raining Stones =

- Directed by: Ken Loach
- Written by: Jim Allen
- Produced by: Sally Hibbin
- Starring: Bruce Jones
- Cinematography: Barry Ackroyd
- Edited by: Jonathan Morris
- Music by: Stewart Copeland
- Distributed by: First Independent Films
- Release dates: May 1993 (Cannes); October 8, 1993 (United Kingdom)
- Running time: 90 minutes
- Country: United Kingdom
- Language: English
- Budget: £0.75 million
- Box office: £256,636

Raining Stones is a 1993 film directed by Ken Loach and starring Bruce Jones, Julie Brown, Ricky Tomlinson, Tom Hickey and Gemma Phoenix. Written by Jim Allen, it tells the story of a man who cannot afford to buy his daughter a First Communion dress, and makes disastrous choices in trying to raise the money. The film won the Jury Prize at the 1993 Cannes Film Festival.

== Plot ==
England is in an economic recession with crushing unemployment. Bob and his best friend Tommy try all sorts of schemes to make money including stealing sheep to sell to local butchers, tearing up turf from government buildings to re-sell and cleaning out bathroom pipes. Bob's wife Anne tries to help but lacks marketable skills (she is let go by a seamstress factory for not knowing how to sew). Despite their best efforts, both men cannot make any job stick or reduce their debts. Despite his family's tenuous financial condition, Bob plans to buy a new outfit for his daughter Coleen's First Communion, though this is prohibitively costly.

Eventually, Bob secretly gets a loan to pay for Coleen's outfit and party. He cannot repay the money, so the lender sells the debt to a vicious loan shark, who forces his way into Bob's house while Bob is out, steals Anne's jewelry and makes numerous threats that he will injure Coleen if he's not paid soon. When Bob gets home, he's outraged at the trauma the loan shark inflicted on his family. He confronts the loan shark at a parking garage outside of a bar. The loan shark beats up Bob and threatens to do even worse. However, as the loan shark begins driving off, Bob smashes his windscreen with a wrench and causes the car to lose control and smash into a column, killing the loan shark. Bob grabs the notebook with all delinquent accounts from the loan shark's pocket and flees.

Bob runs to a nearby church, where he tells the priest what happened and vows to turn himself in to police. The kindhearted priest tells Bob not to turn himself in, noting that Bob didn't kill the loan shark and that many neighbourhood folks are now relieved. He tells Bob to pray for the loan shark's rotten soul and burns the ledger.

The next day, Bob attends Communion as Coleen is adorable in her new outfit. Despite the occasion, he appears withdrawn and nervous, still feeling guilty about what he's done.

== Cast ==
- Anne Marti - Anne Martin
- Bruce Jones – Bob
- Julie Brown – Anne
- Gemma Phoenix – Coleen
- Ricky Tomlinson – Tommy
- Tom Hickey – Father Barry
- Mike Fallon – Jimmy
- Ronnie Ravey – Butcher
- Lee Brennan – Irishman
- Karen Henthorn – Young Mother
- Christine Abbott – May
- Geraldine Ward – Tracey
- William Ash – Joe
- Matthew Clucas – Sean
- Anna Jaskolka – Shop Assistant
- Jonathan James – Tansey
- Ken Strath - Councillor Strath

== Production ==
Raining Stones was shot in and around the Langley Estate in Middleton, Greater Manchester. Bob Williams' flat – as well as the butcher's shop in the opening scenes – were opposite the junction of Wood Street and Windemere Road. The pub from the car park of which Bob's transit van was stolen was The Falcon on the corner of Threlkeld Road and Bowness Road. The Falcon has since been demolished and the site remained undeveloped as of 2010.

== Reception ==
The film received universal critical acclaim. On the review aggregator website Rotten Tomatoes, 100% of 11 critics' reviews are positive. It won the prestigious Grand Prix of the Belgian Syndicate of Cinema Critics.

In a 3.5 Star out of 4 review for the film, Roger Ebert said "The film is good-hearted and the characters are easy to identify with, but what I liked best was the underlying humor, even in this desperate situation."

The film opened on 8 October 1993 in the United Kingdom on 11 screens and grossed £37,211 for the weekend, finishing in 13th place at the UK box office. It went on to gross £256,636 in the UK.

== Year-end lists ==
- Honorable mention – Kenneth Turan, Los Angeles Times
- Honorable mention – Ed Gonzalez, Slant Magazine
