= Michael Forrest =

Welsh television actor (1932–2004)

- Born: July 1932; Bridgend, Wales
- Died: 21 December 2004 (aged 72); Leckwith, Cardiff, Wales
- Education: LAMDA
- Occupation: Television actor

Michael Forrest (July 1932 – 21 December 2004) was a Welsh television actor, who trained at LAMDA in London. He appeared in many British television series and films, which include Sir Francis Drake, Z-Cars, Danger Man, The Saint, The Avengers, UFO, Off to Philadelphia in the Morning, The Rivals of Sherlock Holmes, Doomwatch, Who Dares Wins, Armour of God and others.

== Acting credits ==
Title	Year	Role	Notes
Saturday Playhouse	1958-1959	P.C. Thomas / A Police photographer / Maroso	2 episodes
How Green Was My Valley	1960	Dai Bando	4 episodes
Top Secret	1961	Hinnes	"Stranger in Cantabria"
ITV Play of the Week	1961	Jack Fish / 3rd Stevedore	2 episodes
The Avengers	1961-1967	Rico / Peters	2 episodes
Sir Francis Drake	1962	Jan	"Beggars of the Sea"
BBC Sunday-Night Play	1962	Blackie	"Sparrow in a Cage"
Z-Cars	1962-1970	Det. Con. Glyn Hicks (1962–63)	39 episodes
The Stag	1963	Islwyn Morgan	TV movie
Ghost Squad	1963	Manager of Night Club	"The Heir Apparent"
The Plane Makers	1963	Charlie Barnes	"Has Anybody Seen Costigan?"
The Lover	1963	Milkman	TV movie
The Sentimental Agent	1963	Marlow	"Finishing School"
The Spies	1966	Jones	"Lash Out"
Danger Man	1966	Abelardo	"The Man with the Foot"
That Riviera Touch	1966	Pierre	Film
Theatre 625	1966	Fallow	"Final Demand"
The Informer	1966	Griffiths	"A Word in Your Ear Brother"
The Saint	1966	Vittorio Leale	"The Man Who Liked Lions"
The Baron	1967	Gautier	"Long Ago and Far Away"
George and the Dragon	1967	Ticket collector	"The 10:15 Train"
City '68	1968	Dave Parkinson	"The Jonah Site"
The Wednesday Play	1969	Garfield	"The Big Flame"
Callan	1969	Clive	"Once a Big Man, Always a Big Man"
The Expert	1969	Andrew Redmond	"The Gun That Walked"
The Gold Robbers	1969	Eric	"Crack Shot"
The Best Things in Life	1969	Man in pub	1 episode
Randall and Hopkirk (Deceased)	1969	Verrier	"The Ghost Who Saved the Bank at Monte Carlo"
Strange Report	1970	Inspector Peters	"Report 4977: Swindle - Square Root of Evil"
My Lover, My Son	1970	Chidley	Film
Manhunt	1970	Louis	2 episodes
Ryan International	1970	Theo	"Angel Unawares"
Menace	1970	Stockbreeder	"The Straight and the Narrow"
Dixon of Dock Green	1970-1974	Breen / Cafferty / Frank Whiting	3 episodes
Paul Temple	1971	Brunet	"Corrida"
Play for Today	1971	Holtby	"The Rank and File"
UFO	1971	Security Officer	"Confetti Check A-O.K."
Under Milk Wood	1971	Sinbad Sailor	Film
The Rivals of Sherlock Holmes	1971	Jacques Bouvier	"The Case of the Mirror of Portugal"
Softly, Softly: Task Force	1972	Dunston	"Flight"
The Brothers	1972	Terry Foster	"Confrontation"
Doomwatch	1972	Dr. Evans	"Enquiry"
The Adventurer	1972	Dino	"Has Anyone Here Seen Kelly?"
Two Women	1973	Paride	2 episodes
Six Days of Justice	1973	Joe Hicks	"The China Lady"
Sporting Scenes	1974	Les	"Up and Under"
ITV Sunday Night Drama	1974	Sleppy	"No Harm Done"
Special Branch	1974	Charles	"Date of Birth"
Marked Personal	1974	Benny	2 episodes
Crown Court	1974	Condrey	"Not Dead But Gone Before: Part 1"
Premiere	1977	Ron Williams	"Pit Strike"
Secret Army	1977	Klaus Schoonheim	"Hymn to Freedom"
Off to Philadelphia in the Morning	1978	Sergeant	1 episode
Sexton Blake and the Demon God	1978	Greek Police Chief	"Part 5"
A Horseman Riding By	1978	Lloyd George	"1905: The Hollow Victory"
Hazell	1979	Joe Goss	"Hazell and the Baker Street Sleuth"
The Rear Column	1980		TV movie
Juliet Bravo	1980	Leckie	"The Anastasia Syndrome"
ITV Playhouse	1981	Harry Phillips	"Only a Game"
The Life and Times of David Lloyd George	1981	Bob Smillie	"An Honourable Peace"
Bergerac	1981	Brideson	"See You in Moscow"
Tales of the Unexpected	1982	Chief Insp. Nelson	"Who's Got the Lady?"
Who Dares Wins	1982	Pickley	Film
The Boy Who Won the Pools	1983	Vittachi	1 episode
Angels	1983	Mr. Bowen	2 episodes
The Catlins	1983	T. J. Catlin	1 episode
Number One	1985	Landlord	TV movie
Armour of God	1986		Film, Voice, (final film role)
