= The Save the Children Fund Film =

1971 film by Ken Loach

The Save The Children Fund Film is a 1971 British documentary film directed by Ken Loach and produced by Tony Garnett. Originally known as In Black and White, It was commissioned by London Weekend Television on behalf of the charity Save the Children.

== Synopsis ==
The film is about the work of Save the Children, a British-based charity working for children around the world. This film looks at examples of the charity's work in England and Africa – the Starehe Boys Centre and School in Kenya. According to Garnett's biographer Stephen Lacey, the film-makers objected to what they saw as the charity's "neo-colonial attitude towards indigenous cultures".

In the film, director Ken Loach visits an institution in Nairobi where children were forbidden to converse in their native tongues. Several Save the Children employees were also on film making disparaging remarks about the parents of young Mancunians in their charge.

== Ban ==
Save the Children objected to the film and refused to pay for it. They prevented it from being shown until 2011, when they eventually agreed to allow a screening by the BFI. Kestrel Films, co-founded by Tony Garnett and others, nearly went bankrupt in their legal battle with Save the Children.

There was a screening at the University of Birmingham in 2014, at the University of Bristol in 2015 and one at the University of Warwick in 2017. The screening at Warwick was followed by a panel discussion, which was attended by the then Head of Humanitarian Affairs of Save the Children UK.
