= Land and Freedom (film) =

1995 historical drama film

- Official release poster
- Directed by: Ken Loach
- Written by: Jim Allen
- Produced by: Rebecca O'Brien
- Starring: Ian Hart
- Cinematography: Barry Ackroyd
- Edited by: Jonathan Morris
- Music by: George Fenton
- Distributed by: Artificial Eye (United Kingdom); Alta Films (Spain); Sputnik Film (Germany); Columbia TriStar Films Italia (Italy); Diaphana Films (France)
- Release date: 6 October 1995
- Running time: 109 minutes
- Countries: United Kingdom; Spain; Germany; Italy; France
- Languages: English; Spanish; Catalan
- Budget: about £2,500,000
- Box office: £0.8 million (UK/US)

Land and Freedom (or Tierra y Libertad) is a 1995 historical drama film directed by Ken Loach and written by Jim Allen. The film tells the story of David Carr, an unemployed worker and member of the Communist Party of Great Britain, who decides to fight in the Spanish Civil War for the republicans against a nationalist coup d'état.

The film won the FIPRESCI International Critics Prize and the Prize of the Ecumenical Jury at the 1995 Cannes Film Festival. The film was also nominated for the Palme d'Or at Cannes.

== Plot ==
The film's narrative unfolds in a long flashback. Elderly David Carr has died of a heart attack and his granddaughter discovers old letters, newspapers and other documents in his room: what we see in the film is what he had lived.

Carr, a young unemployed worker and member of the Communist Party, leaves Liverpool and travels to Spain to join the International Brigades. He crosses the Spanish border in Catalonia and coincidentally ends up enlisted in a POUM militia commanded by Vidal, on the Aragon front. In this company, as in all POUM militias, men and women – such as the young and enthusiastic Maite – fight together. In the following weeks and months he becomes friends with other foreign volunteers, like the Frenchman, Bernard and the Irishman, Coogan and the latter's girlfriend Blanca – with whom David Carr later falls in love – also a member of POUM, and also the ideologue of his group.

After being wounded and recovering in a hospital in Barcelona, he finally joins – in accordance with his original plan and against the opinion of Blanca – the government-backed International Brigades, and he encounters the Soviet propaganda and repression against POUM members and anarchists; he then returns to his old company, only to see them rounded up by a government unit requiring their surrender: in a brief clash Blanca is killed. After her funeral he returns to Great Britain with a red neckerchief full of Spanish earth.

Finally the film returns to the present and we see Carr's funeral, in which his granddaughter throws the Spanish earth into his grave after speaking lines from "The Day Is Coming", a poem by William Morris.

Join in the battle wherein no man can fail,
For whoso fadeth and dieth, yet his deed shall still prevail.

Afterwards, she performs a raised fist salute.

== Cast ==
- Ian Hart – David Carr
- Rosana Pastor – Blanca
- Frédéric Pierrot – Bernard Goujon
- Tom Gilroy – Lawrence
- Icíar Bollaín – Maite
- Marc Martínez – Juan Vidal
- Andrés Aladren – Militia member
- Sergi Calleja – Militia member
- Raffaele Cantatore – Militia member
- Pascal Demolon – Militia member
- Paul Laverty – Militia member
- Suzanne Maddock – Kim (David's granddaughter)

== Production ==
The script went through several drafts before filming started, as Loach and screenwriter Jim Allen struggled to create a compelling personal conflict that would mirror the political conflict. When asked in an interview about the number of drafts, Loach replied, "Hundreds, I would think. I couldn't tell you. It just kept evolving. And it was evolving while we were making the film." The production team consulted several different books, including Homage to Catalonia by George Orwell, The Red Spanish Notebook by Mary Stanley Low and Juan Ramón Breá, and The Spanish Civil War by Hugh Thomas, Baron Thomas of Swynnerton, as well as works by Víctor Alba and Gabriel Jackson. They also enlisted the help of John Rocaber, who once fought with the POUM and was arrested by the Republic's army.

== Themes ==
According to Ken Loach, the most important scene of the film is the debate in an assembly of a village liberated by the militia. People from the village where the film was shot play peasant parts in the film and express their thoughts freely (despite language difficulties), and a debate ensues about whether or not to collectivize the village land and that of the recently shot priest. An American with the POUM militia argues that the war effort must come first and that they should try to secure military aid from other countries. He suggests that collectivization will only alienate potential foreign allies, as many of them are capitalist regimes that oppose collective agriculture and other revolutionary actions. The necessity of a contemporaneous war and revolution is expressed by a German militiaman, who says that 'in Germany revolution was postponed and now Hitler is in power'. In the end the villagers vote for collectivization, thereby taking steps on a far-left path. In the anarchist and socialist controlled areas this kind of expropriation of land was common, as the civil war was accompanied by a social revolution.

As in the above scene, Spanish, English and Catalan are spoken in the film, and subtitles are used selectively. Carr arrives in Spain without knowing Spanish but gradually picks it up – and luckily for him English is the lingua franca in his militia.

The social revolution was opposed by the Soviet-supported communists and the liberal republicans and as the war progressed, the government and the communists were able to exploit their access to Soviet arms to restore government control over the war effort, by diplomacy and force. An historical event, the bloody fight between Republicans and Anarchists for control of the Telefónica building in Barcelona, has been chosen by Loach as an emblem of this internal conflict (See Barcelona May Days). Carr's disenchantment starts from this meaningless fight, which he fails to understand because both groups were supposed to be on the same side. At one point he is guarding the Communist Party headquarters in Barcelona and engages in banter across the barricades with the anarchists opposite. He asks a Mancunian among them "Why aren't you over here with us?" In reply his compatriot asks him the same question and Carr answers "I don't know".

Another important moment inspired by events is the execution of a village priest for acting in favour of the fascist side, he has broken the seal of confessional, telling the fascists where the anarchists were hiding and causing their deaths. The priest is also shown to have a bruised shoulder from firing a rifle. Most critics and viewers noted the similarity between the story narrated in this film and George Orwell's book Homage to Catalonia, in which the author wrote one of the more famous accounts of the war and his experience as a volunteer in the ILP Contingent, part of the POUM militia.

== Soundtrack ==
- A las Barricadas – Courtesy of the Confederación Nacional del Trabajo
- La Internacional (1888) – Written by Pierre De Geyter
- A Las Mujeres/"Ramona" (1928) – Music by Mabel Wayne – Lyrics by L. Wolfe Gilbert
- Si me quieres escribir – Written by Juan Ignacio Cuadrado Bueno

== Reception ==
=== Critical response ===
The review aggregator website Rotten Tomatoes reports a 79% approval rating based on 14 reviews.

David Armstrong, cinema critic for The San Francisco Examiner, stated in SF Gate that "Veteran British director Ken Loach continues to toil in the fields of a now largely, and unjustly, eclipsed tradition: European social realism. Working in a near-documentary style that emphasizes the grit of everyday life, the cynical secretiveness of political leaders and the nobility of small people with big dreams, Loach makes feature films of uncommon gravity and integrity".

Philip French writing in The Observer said, "scripted by his regular collaborator, Jim Allen, Loach's movie is a visceral, emotional and intellectual experience, and among the finest films of the decade.".

Richard Porton, a reviewer for Cinéaste, was quite critical of the film's plot and story structure, writing that it was overly sentimental and "holds an admirable political stance hostage to wooden dramaturgy". In particular, he described Carr's decision to burn his Communist Party membership card after Blanca's death as "high-flown kitsch". Nevertheless, he commended Loach for covering a subject that, in Porton's opinion, had been willfully neglected.

=== Box office ===
Land and Freedom opened 6 October 1995 on 9 screens in the United Kingdom and grossed £56,493 in its opening weekend. It went on to gross £620,199 in the UK. In the United States it grossed $228,800.

== Awards and nominations ==
Awards
Award	Category	Name	Outcome
Cannes Film Festival	FIPRESCI Award	Ken Loach	Won
Cannes Film Festival	Prize of the Ecumenical Jury	Ken Loach	Won
Cannes Film Festival	Palme d'Or	Ken Loach	Nominated
European Film Awards	Best Film	Ken Loach	Won
César Awards	Best Foreign Film	Ken Loach	Won
BAFTA Awards	Best British Film	Ken Loach and Rebecca O'Brien	Nominated
Argentinean Film Critics Association Awards	Silver Condor Award for Best Foreign Film	Ken Loach	Nominated
French Syndicate of Cinema Critics Awards	Best Foreign Film	Ken Loach	Won
Nastro d'Argento	Best Foreign Director	Ken Loach	Nominated
Sant Jordi Awards	Best Spanish Film	Ken Loach	Won

== See also ==
- List of Spanish Civil War films

Awards
Preceded by Lamerica	European Film Award for Best European Film; 1995	Succeeded by Breaking the Waves
