= Prostitute (1980 film) =

1980 British film directed by Tony Garnett

- Theatrical release poster
- Directed by: Tony Garnett
- Screenplay by: Tony Garnett
- Produced by: Tony Garnett
- Starring: Eleonor Forsythe; Kate Crutchley
- Cinematography: Charles Stewart; Diane Tammes
- Edited by: Bill Shapter
- Music by: The Gangsters
- Production company: Kestrel Films
- Release date: 13 September 1980
- Running time: 97 minutes
- Country: England
- Language: English

Prostitute is a 1980 British drama film, the directorial debut of Tony Garnett who also wrote and produced the film.

The film tells the story of Sandra (Eleanor Forsythe), "an ambitious working girl who moves to London."

== Plot ==
In Birmingham, several prostitutes know and look out for one another. One, Sandra, has a child, and ambitions to advance beyond just taking street pickups. Her acquaintance Rose, who lives with her mother (who may also have been a prostitute in her youth) and has multiple children, is arrested by the vice squad when she was otherwise walking home and not actively seeking clients. She is pressured into taking a guilty plea and is sentenced to three months in prison. Their mutual friend Louise, a social worker who shares a flat with Sandra, is upset by how the working-class women are harassed by police and are unaware of the rights they have under the law. She recruits Rose's mother to urge other local prostitutes to build a discussion group where they can eventually lobby to change the laws; Louise, friendly enough with Sandra that she takes her as a guest to a wedding, tries to enlist her as well, but Sandra seeks to find better paying sex work in London. Louise, in her research, meets Griff, a lecturer on penal reform, who takes an interest in her cause, but in attempting to summarize its significance, shows himself to have no real knowledge of sex workers' lives. Nonetheless, she is attracted to him, and invites him to stay the night with her, briefly meeting Sandra in the process.

After meeting Andrea, a London-based sex worker, at a business event where several regional prostitutes have been recruited, Sandra decides to decamp to London, making arrangements with Louise and a longtime friend, Winston, to look after her teenage son. Andrea steers Sandra to work as a dubious massage provider for abrasive local boss Mrs. "T" (whom Andrea herself split from acrimoniously), and warns her no favors will be made for her under her employ. Sandra works an increasingly dour array of clients who treat her in hostile manners she never experienced in Birmingham, to the point where she angrily quits Mrs. T's employ, and in turn, Andrea cuts ties with her. When she tries to go fully independent, corrupt vice police invade her apartment without warrant, plant drugs on the premises, and then demand all her money and free sexual services in order to avoid arrest.

Louise faces pressure from her superior, who suggests she is getting too involved with her specific body of sex workers, but otherwise, her activism draws in more local prostitutes, and reserved interest from the city's local MP. Rose is released from her sentence, and happily rejoins her mother and their extended family of sex workers. Louise attracts interest from the BBC to make a documentary about her cause, but cautiously grills their researcher to make sure the women that have earned her trust will not be exploited in the quest for sensationalist TV. Quietly, Sandra returns to Birmingham, and while she misses out on seeing her son, goes to a park and helps other children on swings, demonstrating her parental empathy is still intact.

== Cast ==
- Eleanor Forsythe as Sandra
- Kate Crutchley as Louise
- Kim Lockett as Jean
- Nancy Samuels as Rose
- Riccardo Mangano as David Selby (credited as Richard Mangan)
- Phyllis Hickson as Rose's Mother
- Ann Whittaker as Amanda
- Brigid Mackay as Mrs. 'T'
- Philippa Williams as Linda
- Colin Hindley as Griff

== Production ==
=== Filming ===
Many scenes were shot on location in Balsall Heath, Birmingham's former red-light district. Garnett wrote, produced and directed the film, shooting for six weeks, with a script based on meticulous research conducted over four years and a close collaborative working relationship with Programme for Reform of the Law on Soliciting (PROS) whose growing campaign for changes in the law Garnett positively recognized as a result of his experience making the film.
