= Days of Hope =

1975 British TV drama series

- Written by: Jim Allen
- Directed by: Ken Loach
- Starring: Paul Copley; Pamela Brighton; Nikolas Simmonds
- Theme music composer: Marc Wilkinson
- Country of origin: United Kingdom
- Original language: English
- No. of episodes: 4

Production
- Producer: Tony Garnett
- Cinematography: Tony Pierce-Roberts; John Else
- Editor: Roger Waugh
- Running time: 410 minutes

Original release
- Network: BBC One
- Release: 11 September – 2 October 1975

Days of Hope is a BBC television drama serial produced in 1975. The series dealt with the lives of a working-class family from the turmoil of the First World War in 1916 to the General Strike in 1926. It was written by Jim Allen, produced by Tony Garnett and directed by Ken Loach.

The story opens in 1916 with Ben Matthews joining the British Army for service in World War I. He is transferred to Ireland in order to face local rebels during the Irish revolutionary period (1912-1923). In 1921, Ben's army unit is relocated to County Durham and ordered to face striking miners. Ben decides to desert his army duties, allying himself with the miners during a revolt. Offered hospitality by one of the miners, Ben starts a romantic relationship with his host's eldest daughter. In 1924, Ben is an ex-convict and he joins the ranks of the Communist Party of Great Britain. The action then shifts to the General Strike in 1926, with union leaders betraying the miners and acting against them.

The series was controversial for depicting the British Army using conscientious objectors as bound targets for enemy fire during World War One, but an army veteran published war-era illustrations of this practice in newspapers to establish that this was a real-life event and not fiction. The series was also controversial for its negative portrayal of the former prime minister Winston Churchill, highlighting his actions against the coal miners during the strikes of 1921 and 1926 while comparing him to a vulture. In contrast, the series offered a positive portrayal of the Russian leader Vladimir Lenin and compared him to an eagle.

== Cast ==
- Paul Copley as Ben Matthews
- Pamela Brighton as Sarah Hargreaves
- Nikolas Simmonds as Philip Hargreaves
- Alun Armstrong as Billy Shepherd
- Clifford Kershaw as Tom Matthews
- Helene Palmer as Martha Matthews
- Gary Roberts as Joel Barnett
- Jean Spence as May Barnett
- Christine Anderson as Jenny Barnett
- John Phillips as Josiah Wedgwood
- Stephen Rea as Reporter

== Development ==
The original plan was to make a feature film centered on the 1921 part of the series. Following problems with finance for a cinematic release, the project was moved to the BBC, and the decision was then made to expand from one film to four parts with characters' views changing over time.

== Episodes ==
No.	Title	Original release date	Running time
1	"1916: Joining Up"	11 September 1975	95 minutes
Ben Matthews enlists in the army and ends up serving in Ireland, where there is resistance to British rule. His sister's husband Philip Hargreaves is sentenced to death as a conscientious objector but is given a last-minute reprieve.
2	"1921"	18 September 1975	100 minutes
During the coal lock-out in 1921, Ben's army unit is redeployed from Ireland to police the dispute in County Durham. Ben deserts the army and is sheltered by a miner named Joel. He begins a relationship with Joel's eldest daughter. When donations of food from Liverpool are intercepted by the police and the army, the miners revolt and threaten to blow up the colliery with dynamite, taking some soldiers hostage in the process. Joel and his comrades then make demands on the pit owner, Mr. Pitchard.
3	"1924"	25 September 1975	80 minutes
Ben is released from prison and joins the Communist Party. Philip Hargreaves is elected as a Labour MP.
4	"1926: General Strike"	2 October 1975	135 minutes
The miners are betrayed by union leaders such as J.H. Thomas during the General Strike.

== DVD box-set and certification ==
Days of Hope is included on the Ken Loach at the BBC DVD box-set released in 2011.

The first two episodes of the series were given 15 certificates: the first episode for strong language, and the second for strong language and moderate violence. Episodes 3 and 4 were given PG certificates.

== Reception ==
The first episode of Days of Hope caused considerable controversy in the British media owing to its critical depiction of the military in World War I, and particularly over a scene where conscientious objectors were tied up to stakes outside trenches in view of enemy fire after refusing to obey orders. An ex-serviceman subsequently contacted The Times newspaper with an illustration from the time of a similar scene. In an interview, Loach said that numerous letters were written to newspapers about small inaccuracies (e.g. the soldiers' marching formations) but relatively few challenging the main narrative of events.

In contrast, the Marxist historian John Newsinger has argued that the final episode of Days of Hope was so concerned with historical accuracy about the General Strike that it had become "boring" and "a heroic failure". He contrasts this with "the magnificent socialist dramas" in the first episodes, which were less concerned with historical accuracy.

Winston Churchill is portrayed relatively negatively in the series, which highlights his attitude towards the coal miners during the strikes of 1921 and 1926. Ken Loach said in an interview that the media were particularly offended by a line that compared Churchill to a vulture and Lenin to an eagle.

In an editorial entitled Does the bias run both ways?, The Times defended the decision of the BBC to broadcast the plays against calls for censorship but also questioned whether the BBC would have broadcast a play "with equal dramatic merit, but with a right-wing bias".

A lengthy review in Freedom anarchist fortnightly praised the "painstaking" research, the evolution in character of Sarah Hargreaves and the space given for different points of view in the second episode, but criticized the lengthy dialogue, the forced references to Trotsky and the overuse of slow fade-to-black sequences.
