= Tony Garnett =

British film and TV producer (1936–2020)

- Born: Anthony Edward Lewis; 3 April 1936; Birmingham, England
- Died: 12 January 2020 (aged 83); London, England
- Occupations: Producer, actor
- Years active: 1960–2006
- Spouses: Topsy Legge (m. 1963) Alexandra Ouroussoff (m. 1978; div. 1988)
- Children: 2

Tony Garnett (born Anthony Edward Lewis; 3 April 1936 – 12 January 2020) was a British film and television producer, and actor. Best known for his thirteen-year association with director Ken Loach, his work as a producer continued into the 21st century.

== Early life and career ==
Born Anthony Edward Lewis in Birmingham, he lost his parents when young: his mother Ida (née Poulton) died when he was five from septicaemia following a back-street abortion, and his father Tom Lewis, a garage mechanic turned insurance salesman, committed suicide nineteen days later. Tony was raised by his maternal aunt and uncle, Emily and Harold Garnett, whose surname he adopted in his late teens (while also simplifying his forenames), and his younger brother Peter was raised by other relatives. Garnett attended the Central Grammar School in Birmingham and read psychology at University College, London. By his own admission, he spent most of his time acting in their drama society and on television.

Beginning as an actor, Garnett appeared in An Age of Kings (1960), the BBC's mounting of Shakespeare's eight contiguous history plays, the courtroom film The Boys (1962), Edgar Wallace Mysteries episode Incident At Midnight (1962), several television plays by David Mercer, and an episode Catherine (1964) in the Teletale series, significant for his career because it led to his first meeting with its director, Ken Loach.

== Work with Ken Loach and others ==
Recruited by Roger Smith, he became an assistant story editor at the BBC, working on The Wednesday Play. The plays he worked on included the "very, very personal" Up the Junction (1965), directed by Loach, which features an illegal abortion, but he was soon under contract as a producer. The best known of his contributions to The Wednesday Play series in this role is the docudrama Cathy Come Home (1966), again directed by Loach. Garnett in 1967 introduced Loach to writer Jim Allen, who would be one of the director's collaborators for a quarter of a century. Garnett worked with Allen too, sometimes independently of Loach (The Lump, 1967) but also with him on such works as Allen's The Big Flame (1969), which had been shot in February and March 1968, but was withheld from transmission by the BBC.

Together with dramatist David Mercer, fellow producers Kenith Trodd and James MacTaggart, and literary agent Clive Goodwin, Garnett founded Kestrel Productions, which was conceived as an autonomous unit connected with London Weekend Television. The arrangement led to the production of seventeen television dramas within two years. He and his colleagues, though, found the experience as limiting as they had their period at the BBC. LWT required Garnett and his colleagues to mainly use their television studio and record on video tape, only allowing them to shoot on film and on location occasionally. Despite this, as Kestrel Films, the production company had an interest in the feature films Kes (1969), based on a Barry Hines novel, and Family Life (1971), from a television play by David Mercer. Both were produced by Garnett and directed by Loach.

In 1969, Garnett was the producer of Loach's The Save the Children Fund Film. Commissioned by the charity and originally intended for screening by LWT, it was suppressed for forty years after Save the Children disowned it, and only finally screened in 2011 at BFI Southbank. Days of Hope (1975) was a four-part serial for the BBC written by Jim Allen and directed by Loach. It recounts events from the First World War to the General Strike of 1926. A two-part Play for Today, The Price of Coal (1977), reunited Garnett and Loach with Barry Hines, and was their response to the silver jubilee of the Queen, mixing that celebration with a fatal accident involving two miners, similar to the events of the Cadeby Main pit disaster. The Spongers (1978), written by Allen and directed by Roland Joffé, also used the background of the silver jubilee, this time in the context of government spending cuts in the welfare state, in particular the closure of facilities used by a child with learning difficulties.

Garnett produced G. F. Newman's Law and Order (1978), a quartet of dramas looking at the failings of the British criminal justice system. Its broadcast resulted in questions being asked in parliament. The last production from Garnett's association with Loach was the children's film, Black Jack (1979).

== Later career ==
Garnett's later film credits include Prostitute (1980), Handgun (1983), Earth Girls Are Easy (1988) and Beautiful Thing (1996). After relocating to the United States, Garnett lived by the principle "a movie should never be about what it's about" meaning that, although Earth Girls is disguised as a space comedy about aliens and Follow That Bird (1985) is a Sesame Street style children's film, the real theme of these motion pictures is racial prejudice. In 1990, he founded World Productions, for which Garnett oversaw Between the Lines (1992–94) and This Life (1996–97) and other productions. In 2009, an email by Garnett was circulated within the television industry, and published online, in which he argued that the BBC's management techniques "stifle the creativity which the organisation is supposed to be encouraging". Despite his involvement in the independent production sector, a term he found misleading, Garnett was critical of it. He said that the BBC no longer has an interest in "poor people". When "occasionally they do" feature, the poor "are smirked at or derided as chavs".

== Personal life and death ==
In 1963, Garnett married Topsy Jane Legge, whom he met while performing in amateur theatre. They had a son, Will, and later divorced. In 1978, he married Alexandra Ouroussoff, with whom he had another son, Michael; the couple divorced in 1988. He wrote a memoir, The Day the Music Died: A Life Behind the Lens in 2016. Garnett died on 12 January 2020 after a short illness. He was survived by his partner, Victoria Childs, and his sons.
