= Six Days of Justice =

1972 British TV drama anthology series

- Country of origin: United Kingdom
- No. of episodes: 24

Production
- Producer: Thames Television

Original release
- Network: ITV
- Release: 10 April 1972 – 19 May 1975

Six Days of Justice is a British television drama anthology series of single plays created by Thames Television and shown on ITV from 1972 to 1975, over four seasons of six episodes apiece.

== Synopsis ==
As suggested by the series title, each series of Six Days of Justice is made up of six separate plays, set in and around a courtroom and the corridor and waiting area outside. Focusing on magistrate and children's courts rather than the High Court, the series was praised for its naturalistic setting, lack of melodrama and low-key approach to small-time crime.

== Episodes ==
Series 1

Episode No	Title	Date
01	Cross-Fire	10 April 1972
02	Suddenly... You're in It	17 April 1972
03	A Private Nuisance	24 April 1972
04	Who Cares?	1 May 1972
05	With Intent to Deceive	8 May 1972
06	Open House	15 May 1972

Series 2

Episode No	Title	Date
01	The Counsellor	1 May 1973
02	A Clear-Cut Case	8 May 1973
03	We'll Support You Evermore	15 May 1973
04	Excuse Me, Madam	22 May 1973
05	A Regular Friend	29 May 1973
06	A Little Local Knowledge	5 June 1973

Series 3

Episode No	Title	Date
01	Black Spot	22 October 1973
02	Stranger in Paradise	29 October 1973
03	A Question of Discipline	5 November 1973
04	The Complaint	12 November 1973
05	The China Lady	19 November 1973
06	Case for Committal	26 November 1973

Series 4

Episode No	Title	Date
01	Hot Water	14 April 1975
02	Belonging	21 April 1975
03	Angelica	28 April 1975
04	A Juicy Case	5 May 1975
05	The Good Samaritan	12 May 1975
06	The Brief Facts	19 May 1975

== DVD release ==
Series 1 and series 2 were released by Network DVD in 2012.
