= Evelyn (Play for Today) =

- Play for Today episode
- Episode no.: Series 2 Episode 3
- Directed by: Piers Haggard
- Written by: Rhys Adrian
- Original air date: 28 October 1971

Episode chronology
← Previous "Edna, the Inebriate Woman"	Next → "O Fat White Woman"

"Evelyn" is the third episode of second season of the British BBC anthology TV series Play for Today. The episode was a television play that was originally broadcast on 28 October 1971. "Evelyn" was written by Rhys Adrian, directed by Piers Haggard, produced by Graeme MacDonald, and starred Edward Woodward.

== Production ==
Following Evelyn's success at the Prix Italia, Adrian adapted the play for television. Although largely remaining faithful to the radio production, Adrian incorporated several new scenes including a scene set in a pub where The Man and an equally anonymous friend discuss the former's 40th birthday, and a final coda where The Man returns home to his wife after his affair with The Girl has run its course.

In keeping with the original script, much of the early part of the play is set in The Girl's bedroom, which meant the principal cast were required to perform nude scenes. Despite being considered strong by the standards of the time, the controversy that greeted them was eclipsed a matter of weeks after the play's transmission with the broadcast of Dennis Potter's Casanova on BBC-2.

== Cast ==
- Edward Woodward as The Man
- Angela Scoular as The Girl
- Phyllida Law as The Wife
- Edward de Souza as The Friend
- Charles Bolton as Peter

== Reception ==
Critical reactions to the television version were mixed, with several critics complaining that the stylised language, which worked so well on radio, was not suited to television, leaving the play lumpen and impenetrable. Director Piers Haggard, however, was praised for bringing a clarity to the production that the material itself was considered lacking.
