= Vivian MacKerrell =

British actor (1944–1995)

- Born: Vivian Alan James MacKerrell; 23 May 1944; London, England
- Died: 2 March 1995 (aged 50)
- Education: Royal Central School of Speech and Drama
- Occupation: Actor

Vivian Alan James MacKerrell (23 May 1944 – 2 March 1995) was a British actor of the 1960s and 1970s. He was the basis for the character of Withnail in the film Withnail and I.

== Early life ==
Vivian MacKerrell was the son of Scottish accountant John Alexander McKerrell [sic - spelling] (1906-1994) and Janetta Mary (née Boyns, 1910-1987). The family were well-off. He had two brothers, John and David. The McKerrell parents retired to Bowmore, a town on the shores of the sea loch, Loch Indaal, on the Isle of Islay, where Vivian enjoyed visiting. MacKerrell attended the private Trent College near Nottingham.

== Personality ==
As a student at the Central School of Speech and Drama in London, he shared a house in Albert Street, Camden, London with the musician David Dundas and film director Bruce Robinson, writer and director of Withnail & I (1987). Another house mate, actor Michael Feast, described MacKerrell as a "splenetic wastrel of a fop", whilst Robinson has said he was a "jack of all but a master of none", declaring himself a great actor but doing nothing to prove this. Robinson has also stated that MacKerrell was the funniest person he has ever met.

MacKerrell kept a diary, in which he recorded details of his life in Camden Town: an entry in the volumes for 1974-1975 records, "After a pint, I read and corrected more of Withnail and I and when [Robinson] came back we opened the bottle of Pouilly-Fuissé which L had put out in the window box to chill." These volumes of diaries were put up for sale by auction at Sotheby's in London on 11 July 2024; the lot was later withdrawn.

A biography of MacKerrell, Vivian and I, by Colin Bacon was published in 2010.

== Career ==
In the early 1960s, MacKerrell worked at Nottingham Playhouse, both as assistant stage manager and performing with Ian McKellen in Saturday Night and Sunday Morning and with John Neville in Coriolanus. In the 1970s, he was the junior lead in Hadrian VII at the Mermaid Theatre.

MacKerrell had only a handful of television and film credits, which included a BBC adaptation of Les Misérables where he played the role of Marius (1967), a Play for Today titled "Edna, the Inebriate Woman" (1971), and Ghost Story (1974), a horror film that also starred Marianne Faithfull. He also appeared in the 1967 BBC television version of Pride and Prejudice as Mr Hurst, for which he was credited as Vivian James, an earlier stage name.

== Illness and death ==
MacKerrell's career was curtailed by heavy drinking. He died from throat cancer, which he contracted in his 40s. After a short remission in the mid-1980s, the illness returned and MacKerrell underwent a laryngectomy. Unable to eat or drink, he resorted to injecting alcohol directly into his stomach. In his last days, MacKerrell contracted pneumonia after a drunken incident and died in Gloucestershire Royal Hospital. His last words were reportedly "Give me a fucking pre-med you fuckers, I'm a personal friend of Sir Lancelot Spratt." His ashes were scattered on Loch Indaal, Islay.

Bruce Robinson related how MacKerrell once drank lighter fluid and was unable to see for days after the incident. This is depicted in a scene from Withnail & I. MacKerrell's diaries record the event, as well as others that appear in the film, such as visiting the wolves in Regent's Park Zoo.

== Screen roles ==
1967	Les Misérables (BBC1)	Marius (four of ten episodes)
1967	Pride and Prejudice	Mr Hurst (credited as Vivian James)
1969	Thirty-Minute Theatre - And Was Invited to Form a Government (BBC2)	Kevin Croft
1971	Play for Today - Edna, the Inebriate Woman (BBC1)	Tramp
1974	Ghost Story	Duller
1974	Romance with a Double Bass (short)	Footman (uncredited)

== Bibliography ==
- Bacon, Colin (2010). Vivian and I. London: Quartet. ISBN 978-0-7043-7194-1.
