= Edna, the Inebriate Woman =

- Play for Today episode
- Episode no.: Series 2 Episode 2
- Directed by: Ted Kotcheff
- Written by: Jeremy Sandford
- Original air date: October 21, 1971

Episode chronology
← Previous "Traitor"	Next → "Evelyn"

"Edna, the Inebriate Woman" is the second episode of the second season of the BBC anthology TV series Play for Today, originally broadcast on 21 October 1971. Edna, the Inebriate Woman was written by Jeremy Sandford, directed by Ted Kotcheff, produced by Irene Shubik, and starred Patricia Hayes. The hard-hitting realism of the film was in the British TV tradition of productions such as Cathy Come Home, and led to a degree of public and political debate on the issues it raised. Edna might now be described as a 'bag lady' and a chronic alcoholic.

== Plot ==
The story deals with a 60-year-old woman, Edna O'Casey (Patricia Hayes), who wanders through life in an alcoholic haze without a home, a job or any money. She starts at a hostel where she is checked for fleas and her clothes are bagged and sterilised. A doctor and psychiatrist interview a series of elderly homeless men, assessing whether they can stay at the hostel. Edna goes on the road again, drinking from rivers and gleaning potatoes from fields. She wanders town and country seeking a bed for each night; in a queue, she meets another homeless woman and they travel together.

Social Services are of little help and refuse her money. For her "breakfast ticket" she gets three soups. Edna joins a large homeless group living under a bridge, where she has a long conversation with an Irish man who also feeds her. They mock the young drug user who has joined the group.

Later she walks in the country with a female tramp. A man asking directions to Torrington is obliged to give them a lift. The younger one offers him a good time for "half a quid" (50 pence).

Another female who denies being a "les" shows old photographs of her husband and good times. She used to be beautiful. The hostel manager says "Micks only" (Irish only) but Edna hides under a bed until discovered and thrown out. Back at Social Security she gets upset at being labelled and shouts over and over "I am not the vagrant". She ends up in court for disturbing the peace and from there is placed in a psychiatric ward under the name of Edna Rodgers. There, a patient (June Brown) asks her for any spare pills. Edna does not like the fish they serve and exclaims "This is snot!" They medicate her to control her behaviour and give her electroconvulsive therapy. Examined afterwards they ask if she knows the date: she asks if it is the 32nd. She tries to gas herself to stay another week then changes her mind and goes back on the road.

She rakes through the bins for food scraps and washes her clothes in public lavatories. She gets clothes and boots from a charity, has a new obsession that all phone calls are for her, and is thrown out of a hostel for wetting the bed. Back at Social Security she tries to claim as Edna MacLean. She ends up back in court on breach of the peace charges again. They bring up her record for drunk and disorderly and larceny and she goes to prison, but is quite content.

She is interviewed by "Jesus Saves" for a place in their hostel. The interviewer, Josie Quinn (Barbara Jefford), grants her a place. Although disturbing the other residents in the dormitory, she settles in to this new way of life. The young woman, Trudi, in the neighbouring bed, has issues of her own. Edna comes home drunk and is surprised not only to be let in, but to have a civilised discussion with Josie. Edna cleans up a bit.

The neighbours of the hostel have raised a complaint: the hostel does not have planning permission and causes a nuisance to neighbours. Josie has to defend her actions. On cue, when the court discusses vagrancy, Edna loudly cries out "I am not the vagrant". She remembers her mother and father and how they did not love her; her alcoholic father beat her mother. When her mother went to prison for child abandonment, Edna and her siblings were placed in care.

Back at "Jesus Saves", Edna expects rejection. Josie gets the written decision that her hostel is to be closed and has one month to cease operations. Edna cries for her mother in the toilet and starts to self-harm. The hostel closes, and Edna is back on the street. In the final scene on a city street at night, she is with Teresa discussing the love of her life. Teresa presumes they are going in the same direction, but Edna wanders away into the night, suggesting that she prefers to flitter from place to place.

== Cast ==
- Patricia Hayes as Edna
- Barbara Jefford as Josie Quinn of 'Jesus Saves'
- Geraldine Sherman as Trudi
- Cheryl Hall as Vangi
- Kate Williams as Teresa
- Peggy Aitchison as Lil
- Freda Dowie as Mother Superior
- Roger Hammond as Victor
- John Trigger as Graham
- Walter Sparrow as Common Lodging House Proprietor
- June Watson as Attendant (at The Spike)
- Denis Carey as Doctor
- Jerry Verno as Old Man (at The Spike)
- Rex Rashley as Old Man (at The Spike)
- Amelia Bayntun as Jessie – Tramp
- Douglas Ditta as Social Security Clerk
- Chris Gannon as Tramp
- Talfryn Thomas as Tramp
- Charles Farrell as Tramp
- Vivian MacKerrell as Tramp
- Jenny Logan as Doris, on the Road
- June Brown as Clara (in Psychiatric Hospital)
- Norman Lumsden as Magistrate
- Pat Nye as Irene (at Common Lodging House)
- Malcolm Terris as Psychiatrist (in Psychiatric Hospital)
- Keith Marsh as Porter (in Psychiatric Hospital)
- Eamonn Boyce as Proprietor of Lodging House
- James Cairncross as Rogo (at Charitable Institution)
- Frances Tomelty as Nun
- Jeffrey Segal as Counsel (at Public Hearing)
- David Garth as Defence (at Public Hearing)
- Bartlett Mullins as Neighbour (at Public Hearing)

== Production ==
=== Writing ===
Jeremy Sandford, who had previously written Cathy Come Home, researched the play by living rough himself for two weeks, on two occasions. A great deal of the dialogue and the incidents in the play come from the book Down and Out in Britain, published by Sandford in 1971; although the majority of the speakers in the book are male, Sandford puts much of their speech into the mouth of the main female character.

=== Casting ===
The drama features one of the few acting roles (as a tramp) of British actor Vivian MacKerrell, the real-life inspiration for the character Withnail in the British film Withnail and I (1987).

=== Filming ===
Filming took place in November and December 1970.

== Reception and awards ==
The play gained an audience of some 9 million on its first showing, an unqualified success.

At the 1972 British Academy Television Awards, the play won the Best Drama Production category and Patricia Hayes received the award for Best Actress.
