= The Foxtrot =

- Play for Today episode
- Episode no.: Series 1 Episode 18
- Directed by: Philip Saville
- Written by: Rhys Adrian
- Original air date: 29 April 1971

Episode chronology
← Previous "Reddick"	Next → "When The Bough Breaks"

"The Foxtrot" is the 18th episode of first season of the British BBC anthology TV series Play for Today. The episode was a television play that was originally broadcast on 29 April 1971. "The Foxtrot" was written by Rhys Adrian, directed by Philip Saville and produced by Irene Shubik. It is an early example of the series' departure from socially aware, issue-based drama towards comedy and non-naturalism.

== Synopsis ==
The play is a domestic drama concerning two couples nearing retirement age: Arthur and Gwen, and their friends Harry and Maisie. Gwen, however, is a little too close to Tom — a mutual friend who has recently returned after a long absence. The apparent intimacy between the two has not gone unnoticed; Maisie speculates to Harry that Gwen and Arthur's son, now living in America, seems to bear more of a likeness to Tom than his presumed father. Harry, meanwhile, is more preoccupied with his now sexless marriage and the ever encroaching sound of the new motorway outside their house.

Despite Maisie's concerns about the state of their marriage, Gwen and Arthur appear close to Tom – Arthur regularly meeting him at the local pub, and Tom visiting them at home. One afternoon, while Arthur is at work, Tom invites himself round, foxtrots with Gwen, and reveals that he has always loved her. Gwen questions the sincerity of this declaration because he moved away and left her with Arthur, but does not dismiss his obvious passion for her. Shortly afterwards, Gwen's father dies. At the memorial service, Arthur and Tom sit upfront with Gwen and, to Maisie's amazement, both men console her by placing a hand on her shoulder.

After the funeral, Arthur confronts Tom about his son's legitimacy, contesting his paternity by producing a photograph that shows Tom has more in common with his child than he does. Tom, on the other hand, asserts that Arthur is the natural father, and also presents a photograph to support his claim. In the last scene, Tom is invited back to Arthur and Gwen's and we discover that Tom is Gwen's real husband, and that he left her upon discovering she was having an affair with Arthur. Gwen pleads for Tom and Arthur to put their differences aside and for the former to move in with them. As the end credits roll, the three of them blissfully watch television together, their hands interlinked.

=== Principal cast ===
- Michael Bates as Arthur
- Thora Hird as Gwen
- Donald Pleasence as Tom
- John Collin as Harry
- Diana King as Maisie

== Structure and themes ==
The action of "The Foxtrot" is broken up into several distinct sections, each one allocated an appropriate intertitle. While many of these captions simply describe the scene taking place — "At the pub", "After the funeral", and so on — there are also instances where Adrian uses the intertitles to explicitly reference the tone and undercurrent of particular sequences. During the opening scene, Arthur is asked by a canvasser about his attitude towards the permissive society, at which point a caption appears on screen that reads "Gwen hasn't told Arthur about Tom"; that night, as Arthur and Gwen are talking in bed, a caption introduces the scene as "A tender moment"; towards the end of the play, during one of Tom's many visits to the house, a title announces this as "The Tom, Gwen and Arthur Show".

The play constantly blurs the boundary between what is seen on television and how it relates to, and even shapes, "real life". Gwen's father's death is synchronised with a shoot out he is watching in a television Western: as he reaches into his dressing gown to clutch his chest, the cowboys on television believe their unseen assailant is reaching for a gun and fire — Gwen's father dying instantly of heart failure. On occasion, dialogue from the television programmes the characters are watching is used to comment on the action of the play itself. When Gwen, Arthur and Tom are sat watching an American sitcom together at the end of the play, the characters in that programme fondly bid each other good night ("Good night, Tom! Good night Arthur!") much to the delight of the central protagonists. Canned laughter is also frequently heard in several instances throughout the play, most notably in the pre-title sequence where Tom addresses the camera to asks the viewer, "You wouldn't believe I'm 57, would you?"

The conflict between change and nostalgia forms another important theme in the play. Harry's chagrin at the constant sound of traffic outside his bedroom window leads him to recall a simpler, slower pace of life before "the erosion of people by progress". Alongside Harry's preoccupation with "the way things were", throughout the play Tom is constantly attempting to re-engage with his lost past. 'The tender scene' features an exchange between Arthur and Gwen where the former describes a visit to Tom's place, only to discover him wearing a wig and a pair of sunglasses – this follows a scene where Tom has been rocking backwards and forwards in bed, playing air guitar to a 1950s rock 'n' roll track. It is also noted that he "has his old snapshots re-photographed every three years to keep them bright". Harry and Tom are not the only characters who dwell on the past; Arthur's encounter with the canvasser at the start of the play leads him to consider the nature of sex in light of the permissive society with a sense of cynical outrage, while the conclusion of the piece, where Gwen encourages Tom and Arthur to overcome their differences, offers both an acceptance of a more liberal, relaxed age and an attempt to rekindle a past innocence.

== Broadcast and reception ==
"The Foxtrot" was first broadcast on BBC1 on 29 April 1971 to a mixed critical reception. In his review for the Financial Times, T.C. Worsley described the play as "appallingly ill-constructed" and attacked Philip Saville's direction, which he considered "pretentious" and "gimmicky". Martin Jackson's rather more positive review for the Daily Express stated that despite the play's "marvellously observed characters", Adrian's "gift for comedy" and Saville's "strikingly photographed" direction, he lamented "the erosion of the simple art of storytelling"; this sentiment was shared by several other critics. The Guardian's Peter Fiddick was more enthusiastic, however, and praised its "miraculous combination of precise characterisation and dialogue and bold television technique". Similarly, in The Daily Telegraph, Sean Day-Lewis complimented Saville's "stylish and resourceful production", Adrian's "considerable talent for compassionate comedy" and declared that the play signposted the strengths of the new Play for Today format: "the best hope for original television drama now extant".

Originally made using colour video tape, the play now only survives as a black and white 16mm film recording.

== Intertextuality ==
The subject of enforced, or even accidental, polygamy is explored in several Rhys Adrian works — most notably Evelyn (1969; adapted for television in 1971), which features two lovers engaged in an extra-marital and over-crowded affair. Unlike the central characters in "The Foxtrot", however, the protagonists of Evelyn are unable to accept the complications of such a relationship and become increasingly alienated from each other as a result.

Adrian's 1982 radio play Watching the Plays Together is an answer of sorts to both the critics who derided the episode's non-naturalistic bent and the central theme of that play, exploring the relationship between the audience and television itself. Largely comprising a conversation between a middle-aged married couple troubled by the trend towards social realism in television drama, Watching the Plays Together utilises several of the devices Adrian employed in "The Foxtrot", most notably in the programme content playing out on the couple's television mirroring the characters' own preoccupations and concerns.

== Sources ==
- Best Radio Plays of 1982 (Methuen; 1983)
- John Drakakis (Ed.), British Radio Drama (Cambridge University Press; 1981)
