= Tuchner =

Tuchner is a surname. Notable people with the surname include:

- Michael Tuchner (1932–2017), British film and theatre director
