= Black and Blue (TV series) =

1973 British television comedy-drama

- Title screenshot from episode one
- Genre: Drama
- Country of origin: United Kingdom
- Original language: English
- No. of series: 1
- No. of episodes: 6

Production
- Producer: Mark Shivas
- Running time: 60 minutes

Original release
- Network: BBC 2
- Release: 14 August – 18 September 1973

Black and Blue is a British television comedy-drama series, first broadcast in 1973. Its overall title refers to the black and blue humour of the episodes.

The show consisted of 6 television plays of 50–60 minutes duration, each being separate and self-contained from the others, the only connection between them being the two types of humour.

The first episode was broadcast on 14 August 1973, with the last episode airing on 18 September 1973. The episode "Secrets" was wiped, only surviving because a domestic videotape copy was made from the mastertape by its producer, Mark Shivas.

== Episodes ==
No.	Title	Directed by	Written by	Original release date
1	"Secrets"	James Cellan Jones	Michael Palin and Terry Jones	14 August 1973
Three employees working at a chocolate factory accidentally fall into a vat of chocolate for the company's 'Secrets' assortment. When sales start to soar, it turns out that British consumers have a taste for cannibalism.: Stars Warren Mitchell, Clifford Rose, Julian Holloway, David Collings, Hugh Walters, Brian Wilde, Gretchen Franklin, George Tovey and Sarah Douglas
2	"The Middle-of-the-Road Roadshow for All the Family"	Mark Cullingham	Philip Mackie	21 August 1973
A Wardour Street movie tycoon accidentally hires the wrong scriptwriter to pen a film about the life of Queen Anne and pays him £500,000, and now has to figure out how to get the money back.: Stars Bill Fraser, Ray Brooks, Stephen Moore, Freddie Earlle, Margaret Nolan, Tony Haygarth and Anthony Hopkins
3	"High Kampf"	Michael Apted	Hugh Leonard	28 August 1973
When a wealthy member of a family lays dying in his bed, a bunch of unscrupulous relatives show up and circle him like a pack of vultures waiting for him to die.: Stars Kenneth Colley, Philip Stone, Brenda Fricker, Kevin Flood, Denys Hawthorne and John Bryans
4	"Rust"	Waris Hussein	Julien Mitchell	4 September 1973
When a flu pandemic sweeps over the country and threatens to wipe out civilisation, a drug concocted by a British pharmaceutical company might just be the answer, but alas, it does have a side-effect: it renders people impotent.: Stars John Le Mesurier, Elizabeth Spriggs, James Bree and John Owens
5	"Soap Opera in Stockwell"	Tim Aspinall	Michael O'Neill and Jeremy Seabrook	11 September 1973
When a possible and accidental baby-snatching occurs in front of a launderette, all hell breaks loose. In this episode, all the women over 35 are played by men.: Stars Alfie Bass, Michael Robbins, Tony Robinson, Tony Selby, Cheryl Hall, Harry Landis, Donald Gee, George Tovey, Griffith Davies, Jack May and Clyde Pollitt
6	"Glorious Miles"	Ian MacNaughton	Henry Livings	18 September 1973
A millionaire decides to hire a butler just so he can impress his friends, but the butler thinks he has been hired for a much deadlier and sinister purpose.: Stars Peter Vaughan, Dinsdale Landen, Russell Hunter and Penelope Lee
