= Play for Today =

British television anthology series

- Logo as seen in the opening title sequence from 1976
- Genre: Drama, television plays, anthology, social realism, kitchen-sink drama
- Country of origin: United Kingdom
- Original language: English
- No. of series: 14
- No. of episodes: 306 (28 missing, 1 incomplete)

Production
- Running time: Various

Original release
- Network: BBC1
- Release: 15 October 1970 – 28 August 1984

Related
- The Wednesday Play; Screen Two, Screen One; Rumpole of the Bailey, Gangsters, Headmaster, Play for Tomorrow; Play for Today (Channel 5 series)

Play for Today is a British television strand, produced by the BBC and transmitted on BBC1 from 1970 to 1984. During the run, more than three hundred programmes featuring original television plays and adaptations of stage plays and novels were transmitted. The individual episodes were (with a few exceptions noted below) between fifty and a hundred minutes in duration. A handful of these plays, including Rumpole of the Bailey, subsequently became television series in their own right.

In 2025, Channel 5 announced a revival, which began broadcasting on 13 November.

== History ==
The strand was a successor to The Wednesday Play, the 1960s anthology series, the title being changed when the day of transmission moved to Thursday to make way for a sport programme. Some works, screened in anthology series on BBC2, like Willy Russell's Our Day Out (1977), were repeated on BBC1 in the series. The producers of The Wednesday Play, Graeme MacDonald and Irene Shubik, transferred to the new series. Shubik continued with the series until 1973 while MacDonald remained with the series until 1977 when he was promoted. Later producers included Kenith Trodd (1973–1982), David Rose (1972–1980), Innes Lloyd (1975–1982), Margaret Matheson (1977–1979), Richard Eyre (1978–1980), and Pharic MacLaren (1974–1982).

Plays covered all genres. In its time, Play for Today featured contemporary social realist dramas, historical pieces, fantasies, biopics and occasionally science fiction (The Flipside of Dominick Hide, 1980). Most pieces were written directly for television, but there were also occasional adaptations from other narrative forms, such as novels and stage plays.

Writers who contributed plays to the series included Ian McEwan, John Osborne, Dennis Potter, Stephen Poliakoff, Sir David Hare, Willy Russell, Alan Bleasdale, Arthur Hopcraft, Alan Plater, Graham Reid, David Storey, Andrew Davies, Rhys Adrian and John Hopkins.

Several prominent directors also featured, including Stephen Frears, Alan Clarke, Michael Apted, Mike Newell, Roland Joffé, Ken Loach, Lindsay Anderson, and Mike Leigh. Some of the best-remembered plays broadcast in the strand include Edna, the Inebriate Woman (1971), The Foxtrot (1971), Home (1972), The Fishing Party (1972), Bar Mitzvah Boy (1976), The Other Woman (1976), Abigail's Party (1977), Blue Remembered Hills (1979) and Just a Boys' Game (1979). Certain other plays, including Penda's Fen (1974) and Nuts in May (1976), were commissioned by David Rose of the BBC's English Regions Drama department based in Pebble Mill Studios in Birmingham.

Some installments in the series were spun off into full-blown series, including Rumpole of the Bailey, which was produced as a one-off in the Play for Today strand in 1975 and three years later became a series for Thames Television, again with Leo McKern. Alan Bleasdale's The Black Stuff, was a single play broadcast on BBC2 in January 1980, which was developed into Boys from the Blackstuff. It was never part of the Play For Today strand, although it was repeated on BBC1 later that year as a single play.

Other offshoots were Gangsters, Headmaster, and a single series of science fiction-based plays styled as Play for Tomorrow. Towards the end of the run, three plays set in Northern Ireland were written by Graham Reid. Known as the Billy Plays, they starred Kenneth Branagh as Billy Martin in his first acting role following his graduation from RADA.

There were also some groups of plays transmitted that – for various reasons – did not go out under the Play for Today banner, but which were funded from the same department, used much the same production team and are generally regarded in episode guides and analysis as being part of the Play for Today canon.

Several plays were BAFTA award winners. John Le Mesurier and Patricia Hayes were named Best Actor and Actress, respectively, for their roles in the 1971 series Traitor and Edna, The Inebriate Woman, the latter also being named Best Drama Production. Celia Johnson was named Best Actress for Mrs. Palfrey at the Claremont, broadcast in 1973. Stocker's Copper (1972), Kisses at Fifty (1973), Bar Mitzvah Boy (1976), Spend, Spend, Spend! (1977), Licking Hitler (1978), and Blue Remembered Hills (1979) were all named Best Single Play by BAFTA.

Videotapes of thirty-seven of the episodes produced between 1970 and 1975 were wiped after transmission, and no copies of many of them are known to exist.

Two plays were controversially pulled from transmission shortly before broadcast due to concerns over their content: these were Dennis Potter's Brimstone & Treacle in 1976 and Roy Minton's Scum the following year. In the case of Brimstone & Treacle it was due to concerns over the play's depiction of a disabled woman's rape at the hands of a man who may possibly have been the devil, and with Scum the worry was its supposed sensationalism of life in a borstal. Scum and Brimstone & Treacle were eventually transmitted, although in the meantime both had circumvented their withdrawal by being re-made as cinema films. Another play Pillion recorded in 1979 was never broadcast.

One play, The Other Woman, generated some mild controversy for its "graphic depiction" of lesbianism, and for the onscreen kiss between Jane Lapotaire and Lynne Frederick.

== Demise and legacy ==
After fourteen series and numerous repeats of individual productions, the programme officially ended in August 1984, although two series of single dramas without Play for Today billing were broadcast on BBC1 in a similar time slot from July to December 1983 and from November 1984 to February 1985. Thereafter the strand of single dramas became Screen Two on BBC2 from January 1985, and later also Screen One on BBC1 from September 1989. The general trend in 1980s television production was away from one-off plays and towards a greater concentration on series and serials. When one-offs were produced, such as Film on Four on Channel 4, they tended to be made with a cinematic approach rather than betraying television drama's roots in the theatre that Play for Today and earlier series on both the BBC and ITV had often demonstrated.

Nonetheless, the series is generally remembered as a benchmark of high-quality British television drama, and has become a byword for what many continue to argue was a golden age of British television. In 2000, the British Film Institute produced a poll of industry professionals to determine the 100 Greatest British Television Programmes of the 20th century, and five of the programmes included in the final tally were from Play for Today.

A new programme publicised as a return of Play for Today, but under the working title of The Evening Play, was announced at the beginning of March 2006, but nothing has been heard from it since. Kevin Spacey, film star and director of the Old Vic, in March 2008 told BBC News that he would like to see the return of the show, but the journalists Michael Gove and Mark Lawson expressed disagreement, Gove (by then a Conservative MP) describing them as "exercises in viewer patronisation". Jan Moir in The Daily Telegraph wrote in support of Spacey, saying "the British loved Play for Today once, and would do so again. A good piece of drama looks at the human condition, and tells us something we should know about ourselves."

A book detailing the origins of the series, Play for Today: The First Year by Simon Farquhar, was published in 2021.

== Productions ==
The following list was sourced according to the BBC Genome archive of Radio Times magazines. Titles that carried the tag Play For Today on the BBC listings for their first or subsequent transmission are included, along with some repeats such as the repeat of the Days of Hope quartet, where the initial broadcast was not branded Play for Today, but the repeat was. Repeats of the individual productions are excluded. All episodes were broadcast on BBC1, except for the delayed broadcast of Scum in 1991 which was broadcast on BBC2.

Some early episodes are missing or no longer exist in colour.

Original air date	Title	Authors	Producer	Director	Lead actor(s)	Home media	Notes
Series 1
15 Oct 1970	The Long Distance Piano Player	Alan Sharp	Irene Shubik	Philip Saville	Ray Davies		Repeated 13 April 1972. 16 mm b&w print
22 Oct 1970	The Right Prospectus	John Osborne	Irene Shubik	Alan Cooke	George Cole, Elvi Hale		Repeated 16 December 1971
29 Oct 1970	The Lie	Ingmar Bergman & Paul Britten Austin	Graeme McDonald	Alan Bridges	Frank Finlay	Included on the Play for Today Vol. 1 BFI Blu-ray set	Written by Ingmar Bergman, translated by Paul Britten Austin. A production for The Largest Theatre in the World project of the EBU. Winner of the SFTA award for best drama production of 1970. Repeated on BBC2 31 March 1971, and on BBC1 16 March 1972.
5 Nov 1970	Angels Are So Few	Dennis Potter	Graeme McDonald	Gareth Davies	Tom Bell		
12 Nov 1970	The Write-Off	George Salverson	Rudi Dorin		Cec Linder		Canadian production. Missing.
19 Nov 1970	I Can't See My Little Willie	Douglas Livingstone	Irene Shubik	Alan Clarke	Nigel Stock		Repeated 18 May 1972. Missing except for domestic audio recording.
26 Nov 1970	A Distant Thunder	Maurice Edelman	Irene Shubik	James Ferman	Adrienne Corri		Missing.
3 Dec 1970	Hearts and Flowers	Peter Nichols	Irene Shubik	Christopher Morahan	Anthony Hopkins		Repeated 9 March 1972. 16 mm b&w print
10 Dec 1970	Robin Redbreast	John Bowen	Graeme McDonald	James MacTaggart	Anna Cropper	DVD release by the BFI	Due to a power cut, the ending of this episode was blacked out in many areas, necessitating a repeat of the full episode on 25 February 1971. 16mm b&w print
17 Dec 1970	The Hallelujah Handshake	Colin Welland	Graeme McDonald	Alan Clarke	Tony Calvin	Included in the Dissent & Disruption: Alan Clarke at the BBC Blu-ray set	Repeated 23 December 1971.
7 Jan 1971	Alma Mater	David Hodson	Irene Shubik	James Ferman	Ian Carmichael		Repeated 4 May 1972. Missing.
14 Jan 1971	Circle Line	W. Stephen Gilbert	Graeme McDonald	Claude Whatham	Michael Feast		The Winner of the BBCtv Student Play Competition. Missing.
21 Jan 1971	Hell's Angel	David Agnew	Graeme McDonald	Alan Cooke	Katherine Blake		David Agnew is a BBC in-house pen name typically used when multiple writers contributed to a script. Anthony Read was the author commissioned to write the play. Repeated 25 May 1972. Missing.
28 Jan 1971	The Piano	Julia Jones	Graeme McDonald	James Cellan Jones	Glyn Owen		Repeated 10 August 1972.
4 Feb 1971	Billy's Last Stand	Barry Hines	Graeme McDonald	John Glenister	Dudley Foster		Repeated 20 April 1972. Missing.
11 Feb 1971	The Rainbirds	Clive Exton	Irene Shubik	Philip Saville	Madge Ryan		A production for The Largest Theatre in the World project of the EBU.
18 Feb 1971	Reddick	Munroe Scott	Mervyn Rosenzveig		Donald Harron		Canadian production. Missing.
11 Mar 1971	No Trams to Lime Street	Alun Owen (Book), Marty Wilde & Ronnie Scott (Music & Lyrics)	Harry Moore	Piers Haggard	Anthony May		Musical. First shown under The Wednesday Play, 18 March 1970.
18 Mar 1971	Mad Jack	Tom Clarke	Graeme McDonald	Jack Gold	Michael Jayston		First shown under The Wednesday Play, 4 February 1970. Winner of the first prize and the silver Dore Catholic Prize at the 1971 Monte Carlo International Television Festival.
25 Mar 1971	Scenes from Family Life	Barry Bermange	Ronald Travers	Naomi Capon	Denholm Elliott		First shown under Plays of Today on BBC2, 25 September 1969.
1 Apr 1971	Wind Versus Polygamy	Obi Egbuna	Michael Bakewell	Naomi Capon	Earl Cameron		First shown under Theatre 625 15 July 1968 and then The Wednesday Play, 27 May 1970.
8 Apr 1971	Playmates	Johnny Speight	Graeme McDonald	John McGrath	Marty Feldman		First shown within Double Bill of The Wednesday Play on 26 November 1969.
15 Apr 1971	Sovereign's Company	Don Shaw	Irene Shubik	Alan Clarke	Roland Culver	Included in the Dissent & Disruption: Alan Clarke at the BBC Blu-ray set	First shown under The Wednesday Play, 22 April 1970.
22 Apr 1971	Season of the Witch	Desmond McCarthy & Johnny Byrne	Anne Head	Desmond McCarthy	Julie Driscoll		First shown under The Wednesday Play, 7 January 1970.
29 Apr 1971	The Foxtrot	Rhys Adrian	Irene Shubik	Philip Saville	Donald Pleasence		Repeated 30 March 1972. 16 mm b&w print
6 May 1971	When The Bough Breaks	Tony Parker	Irene Shubik	James Ferman	Hannah Gordon		Repeated 11 May 1972.
13 May 1971	Orkney	George Mackay Brown & John McGrath	Graeme McDonald	James MacTaggart	Maurice Roëves		Three stories by George Mackay Brown, adapted by John McGrath: A Time to Keep, The Whaler's Return and Celia. Repeated 27 April 1972.
20 May 1971	The Rank And File	Jim Allen	Graeme McDonald	Ken Loach	Peter Kerrigan	Included on the Ken Loach at the BBC DVD boxset	
27 May 1971	The Man in the Sidecar	Simon Gray	Graeme McDonald	James MacTaggart	Gemma Jones		Repeated 24 August 1972. Missing.
3 Jun 1971	Everybody Say Cheese	Douglas Livingstone	Irene Shubik	Alan Clarke	Roy Kinnear		Missing.
10 Jun 1971	The Cellar and the Almond Tree	David Mercer	Graeme McDonald	Alan Bridges	Celia Johnson		First shown under The Wednesday Play, 4 March 1970. Repeated on BBC2 on 13 December 1980 and on BBC1 on 14 July 1988.
17 Jun 1971	The Italian Table	William Trevor	Irene Shubik	Herbert Wise	Leonard Rossiter		First shown under The Wednesday Play, 18 February 1970.
24 Jun 1971	There Is Also Tomorrow	Hugo Charteris	Graeme McDonald	John Mackenzie	Glyn Houston		First shown under The Wednesday Play, 19 November 1969.
1 Jul 1971	Chariot of Fire	Tony Parker	Irene Shubik	James Ferman	Rosemary Leach		First shown under The Wednesday Play, 20 May 1970.
Series 2
14 Oct 1971	Traitor	Dennis Potter	Graeme McDonald	Alan Bridges	John Le Mesurier		BAFTA Best Actor (John Le Mesurier). Repeated on BBC2 on 27 February 1973 and on BBC1 on 21 July 1987.
21 Oct 1971	Edna, the Inebriate Woman	Jeremy Sandford	Irene Shubik	Ted Kotcheff	Patricia Hayes	Included on the Play for Today Vol. 3 BFI Blu-ray set	BAFTA Best Actress (Patricia Hayes) & Drama Production. Repeated 2 Mar 1972, on BBC2 on 20 August 1977 and on BBC2 on 3 November 1986.
28 Oct 1971	Evelyn	Rhys Adrian	Graeme McDonald	Piers Haggard	Edward Woodward		Repeated 27 July 1972 and on BBC2 20 February 1973.
4 Nov 1971	O Fat White Woman	William Trevor	Irene Shubik	Philip Saville	Peter Jeffrey		Repeated 16 July 1973.
11 Nov 1971	Thank You Very Much	N. F. Simpson	Graeme McDonald	Claude Whatham	Julian Holloway		Duration 40 minutes. 16 mm b&w print.
18 Nov 1971	Michael Regan	Robert Holles	Irene Shubik	John Gorrie	David Burke		Repeated 17 August 1972.
25 Nov 1971	Skin Deep	Michael O'Neill & Jeremy Seabrook	Graeme McDonald	Michael Lindsay-Hogg	Donald Pleasence		Missing.
2 Dec 1971	Pal	Alun Owen	Irene Shubik	Silvio Narizzano	Robin Phillips		Missing.
9 Dec 1971	The Pigeon Fancier	Peter Hankin	Irene Shubik	James Ferman	Bert Palmer		16mm b&w print
6 Jan 1972	Home	David Storey	Jac Venza	Lindsay Anderson	John Gielgud	DVD release by Metrodome	A NET/CBC production. Adapted by the playwright from his original stage play. Repeated on BBC2 6 February 1973.
13 Jan 1972	Still Waters	Julia Jones	Graeme McDonald	James MacTaggart	Margery Mason		Repeated 3 August 1972.
20 Jan 1972	Stocker's Copper	Tom Clarke	Graeme McDonald	Jack Gold	Bryan Marshall	Included on the Play for Today Vol. 2 BFI Blu-ray set	BAFTA Best Single Play. Writers' Guild Awards 1972: Best British Original Teleplay. Repeated 18 December 1972 and 31 August 1982. Shown in the USA on 23 July 1977 as a Piccadilly Circus episode.
27 Jan 1972	The House On Highbury Hill	Piers Paul Read	Graeme McDonald	John Glenister	Colin Farrell		Missing.
3 Feb 1972	In the Beautiful Caribbean	Barry Reckord	Irene Shubik	Philip Saville	Calvin Lockhart		Missing.
10 Feb 1972	Ackerman, Dougall and Harker	Don Shaw	Irene Shubik	Ted Kotcheff	Martin C. Thurley		Repeated 6 August 1973.
17 Feb 1972	The Villa Maroc	Willis Hall	Irene Shubik	Herbert Wise	Thora Hird		Repeated 30 July 1973.
24 Feb 1972	Cows	Howard Barker	Graeme McDonald	John Gorrie	Alison Leggatt		Missing.
1 Jun 1972	The Fishing Party	Peter Terson	David Rose	Michael Simpson	Brian Glover	DVD release by Simply Media	From BBC Birmingham. Repeated 9 July 1973 and on BBC2 4 August 1993.
Series 3
9 Oct 1972	The Reporters	Arthur Hopcraft	Graeme McDonald	Michael Apted	Robert Urquhart		Repeated 3 January 1974 and 18 April 1974.
16 Oct 1972	A Life Is For Ever	Tony Parker	Irene Shubik	Alan Clarke	Maurice O'Connell		Repeated 11 July 1974. Missing.
23 Oct 1972	Carson Country	Dominic Behan	Graeme McDonald	Piers Haggard	J. G. Devlin		
30 Oct 1972	Man Friday	Adrian Mitchell	Graeme McDonald	James MacTaggart	Colin Blakely		Missing.
6 Nov 1972	Triple Exposure	David Halliwell	Irene Shubik	Alan Cooke	Alec McCowen		
13 Nov 1972	Better Than the Movies	John Elliot	Graeme McDonald	Roy Battersby	Bryan Marshall		Missing.
20 Nov 1972	The General's Day	William Trevor	Irene Shubik	John Gorrie	Alistair Sim		
27 Nov 1972	The Bankrupt	David Mercer	Graeme McDonald	Christopher Morahan	Joss Ackland		
4 Dec 1972	Just Your Luck	Peter McDougall	Graeme McDonald	Mike Newell	Lesley Mackie	BBC DVD	Repeated 18 July 1974.
11 Dec 1972	The Bouncing Boy	John McGrath	Graeme McDonald	Maurice Hatton	Norman Eshley		Repeated 25 April 1974.
8 Jan 1973	Shakespeare or Bust	Peter Terson	David Rose	Brian Parker	Janet Suzman	Included on the Play for Today Vol. 1 BFI Blu-ray set	From BBC Birmingham. Repeated 4 April 1974.
15 Jan 1973	Land of Green Ginger	Alan Plater	David Rose	Brian Parker	Gwen Taylor		From BBC Birmingham. Repeated 24 January 1974 and on BBC4 26 March 2005.
22 Jan 1973	Kisses at Fifty	Colin Welland	Graeme McDonald	Michael Apted	Bill Maynard		BAFTA Best Single Play. Repeated 20 December 1973 and on BBC2 11 August 1993.
29 Jan 1973	Highway Robbery	Michael O'Neill & Jeremy Seabrook	Graeme McDonald	Michael Apted	John Collin		Missing.
5 Feb 1973	Song at Twilight	Willis Hall	Irene Shubik	Herbert Wise	Colin Blakely		Missing.
12 Feb 1973	Only Make Believe	Dennis Potter	Graeme McDonald	Robert Knights	Keith Barron		Repeated 2 May 1974.
19 Feb 1973	For Sylvia, or the Air Show	John Burrows & John Harding	Kenith Trodd	Barry Davis	John Burrows		Missing.
26 Feb 1973	The Operation	Roger Smith	Kenith Trodd	Roy Battersby	George Lazenby		
5 Mar 1973	Access to the Children	William Trevor	Irene Shubik	Philip Saville	Joss Ackland		Repeated 9 May 1974.
12 Mar 1973	Hard Labour	Mike Leigh	Tony Garnett	Mike Leigh	Liz Smith	Included on the Mike Leigh at the BBC DVD set	Repeated 30 May 1974, on BBC2 18 August 1993, and on BBC4 14 July 2008 and 7 December 2021.
19 Mar 1973	Man Above Men	David Hare	Mark Shivas	Alan Clarke	Gwen Watford		Missing.
26 Mar 1973	Speech Day	Barry Hines	Graeme McDonald	John Goldschmidt	David Smith		Repeated 10 January 1974.
14 May 1973	Steps Back	David Halliwell	David Rose	Brian Parker	David Hill		
4 Jun 1973	Three's One	Penelope Mortimer	Graeme McDonald	Alastair Reid	Hywel Bennett		Missing.
11 Jun 1973	Edward G - Like the Filmstar	John Harvey-Flint	Graeme McDonald	James Ferman	Robert Lang		Missing.
18 Jun 1973	Blooming Youth	Leslie Blair	Tony Garnett	Leslie Blair	Philip Jackson		Repeated 16 May 1974.
25 Jun 1973	The Stretch	Julia Jones	Graeme McDonald	Peter Dews	June Ellis		Missing.
2 Jul 1973	Making the Play	Terence Brady & Charlotte Bingham	Kenith Trodd	Michael Hayes	James Bolam		Missing.
Series 4
18 Oct 1973	Mrs. Palfrey at the Claremont	Elizabeth Taylor	Graeme McDonald	Michael Lindsay-Hogg	Celia Johnson		Adapted from the novel. BAFTA Best Actress (Celia Johnson). Repeated 20 March 1975.
25 Oct 1973	Her Majesty's Pleasure	Jimmy O'Connor	Kenith Trodd	Barry Davis	John Bindon		
1 Nov 1973	Jack Point	Colin Welland	Kenith Trodd	Michael Apted	Stephen Murray		Repeated 3 April 1975.
8 Nov 1973	The Emergency Channel	John Bowen	Graeme McDonald	Robert Knights	Richard Pascoe		Missing.
15 Nov 1973	Mummy and Daddy	Douglas Livingstone	Kenith Trodd	Barry Davis	Neil Wilson		Incomplete.
22 Nov 1973	Private Practice	Peter Hankin	Mark Shivas	Peter Cregeen	Priscilla Morgan		Missing.
29 Nov 1973	Shutdown	Tony Perrin	Kenith Trodd	John Mackenzie	Freddie Fletcher		Repeated 19 June 1975.
6 Dec 1973	Baby Blues	Nemone Lethbridge	Kenith Trodd	James MacTaggart	Zena Walker		
13 Dec 1973	Jingle Bells	Arthur Hopcraft	Graeme McDonald	Claude Whatham	Colin Farrell		Missing.
17 Jan 1974	The Lonely Man's Lover	Barry Collins	David Rose	Brian Parker	Jan Francis		From BBC Birmingham. Repeated 6 February 1975.
31 Jan 1974	All Good Men	Trevor Griffiths	Graeme McDonald	Michael Lindsay-Hogg	Bill Fraser		
14 Feb 1974	Joe's Ark	Dennis Potter	Graeme McDonald	Alan Bridges	Freddie Jones		Repeated 19 December 1974, 7 July 1987, and on BBC4 30 January 2005.
21 Feb 1974	Hot Fat	Jack Rosenthal	Graeme McDonald	Derek Bennett	Richard O'Callaghan		Missing.
7 Mar 1974	Easy Go	Brian Clark & Ronnie King, Cliff Norris, Peter French, Paul Stuart, Tony Ali, Paul Bishop, Deirdre Walsh, Janice Reeves	Graeme McDonald	Michael Tuchner	Alun Armstrong		Postponed from 7 February 1974.
14 Mar 1974	Headmaster	John Challen	Graeme McDonald	Anthony Page	Frank Windsor		Repeated 12 June 1975. Spun off as a series in 1977.
21 Mar 1974	Penda's Fen	David Rudkin	David Rose	Alan Clarke	Spencer Banks	Blu-ray and DVD by the BFI; also included in the Dissent & Disruption: Alan Clarke at the BBC Blu-ray set	From BBC Birmingham. Repeated 13 February 1975.
28 Mar 1974	Pidgeon - Hawk or Dove?	Michael Sadler	David Rose	David Rose	Iain Cuthbertson		
11 Apr 1974	Three for the Fancy	Peter Terson	David Rose	Matthew Robinson	Brian Glover		Repeated 28 August 1974.
6 Jun 1974	The Cheviot, the Stag and the Black, Black Oil	John McGrath	Graeme McDonald	John Mackenzie	Charles Kearney	Blu-ray & DVD releases by Panamint Cinema	Adapted from the stage play. Repeated 17 April 1975.
20 Jun 1974	Schmoedipus	Dennis Potter	Kenith Trodd	Barry Davis	Anna Cropper		Repeated 10 April 1975.
27 Jun 1974	The Childhood Friend	Piers Paul Read	Graeme McDonald	Mike Newell	Anthony Hopkins		
4 Jul 1974	A Follower for Emily	Brian Clark	Graeme McDonald	Alan Clarke	Herbert Ramskill	Included in the Dissent & Disruption: Alan Clarke at the BBC Blu-ray set	
Series 5
31 Oct 1974	Leeds — United!	Colin Welland	Kenith Trodd	Roy Battersby	Lynne Perrie		Duration 115 minutes. Repeated 12 August 1976. Repeated on BBC4 3 November 2020.
7 Nov 1974	Baby Love	David Edgar	Kenith Trodd	Barry Davis	Patti Love		Adapted from the play.
14 Nov 1974	Back of Beyond	Julia Jones	Graeme McDonald	Desmond Davis	Rachel Roberts	Included on the Play for Today Vol. 1 BFI Blu-ray set	Repeated 5 August 1976.
21 Nov 1974	The Bevellers	Roddy McMillan	Pharic MacLaren	Moira Armstrong	Roddy McMillan		From BBC Scotland
28 Nov 1974	Taking Leave	Joyce Neary	Kenith Trodd	John Mackenzie	George Sewell		
5 Dec 1974	Fugitive	Sean Walsh	Kenith Trodd	Peter Gill	Stephen Rea		
12 Dec 1974	Eleanor	William Trevor	Irene Shubik	Barry Davis	Colin Douglas		
9 Jan 1975	Gangsters	Philip Martin	Barry Hanson	Philip Saville	Maurice Colbourne	Included on the Gangsters DVD set	From BBC Birmingham. Duration 110 minutes. Repeated 2 September 1976. Spun off as a series.
16 Jan 1975	The After Dinner Game	Malcolm Bradbury & Christopher Bigsby	David Rose	Robert Knights	Timothy West		From BBC Birmingham
23 Jan 1975	Breath	Elaine Feinstein	David Rose	Matthew Robinson	Angela Pleasence		From BBC Birmingham
30 Jan 1975	The Death of a Young Young Man	Willy Russell	David Rose	Viktors Ritelis	Gary Brown		From BBC Birmingham
20 Feb 1975	Sunset Across the Bay	Alan Bennett	Innes Lloyd	Stephen Frears	Gabrielle Daye, Harry Markham	Included on the Alan Bennett at the BBC DVD boxset	Repeated 19 August 1976 and on BBC2 26 July 1992.
27 Feb 1975	Funny Farm	Roy Minton	Mark Shivas	Alan Clarke	Tim Preece	Included in the Dissent & Disruption: Alan Clarke at the BBC Blu-ray set	
6 Mar 1975	Goodbye	Hugh Whitemore	Kenith Trodd	Gavin Millar	Jeremy Kemp		From the novel by William Sansom.
13 Mar 1975	Just Another Saturday	Peter McDougall	Graeme McDonald	John Mackenzie	John Morrison	Included on the Play for Today Vol. 3 BFI Blu-ray set & The Peter McDougall Collection DVD set	Winner of the 1975 Italia Prize for Television Drama Programmes. Repeated on BBC2 7 November 1975, on BBC1 26 August 1976 and on BBC2 24 August 1977.
24 Apr 1975	Child of Hope	John Elliot	Graeme McDonald	Graham Evans	Leon Gluckman		Based on Joel Carlson's book No Neutral Ground.
1 May 1975	The Saturday Party	Brian Clark	Mark Shivas	Barry Davis	Peter Barkworth		Repeated 25 April 1977, the day before its sequel, The Country Party.
8 May 1975	Wednesday Love	Arthur Hopcraft	Graeme McDonald	Michael Apted	Lois Daine		
15 May 1975	The Dandelion Clock	Wilson John Haire	Ann Scott	John Bruce	Verona O'Hara		Missing.
22 May 1975	Brassneck	Howard Brenton & David Hare	Graeme McDonald	Mike Newell	Jeremy Kemp		Adapted from the play.
29 May 1975	The Floater	Peter Prince	Graeme McDonald	Barry Davis	Richard Beckinsale		
5 June 1975	By Common Consent	Paul Thompson	Kenith Trodd	Ron Daniels, John Robins	Michelle Abrahams		Adapted from the play. Not billed as a Play for Today in the Radio Times.
Series 6
14 Oct 1975	Plaintiffs and Defendants	Simon Gray	Kenith Trodd	Michael Lindsay-Hogg	Alan Bates		Shown in the USA on 16 July 1977 as a Piccadilly Circus episode.
21 Oct 1975	Two Sundays	Simon Gray	Kenith Trodd	Michael Lindsay-Hogg	Alan Bates		Repeated 1 Sep 1977.
28 Oct 1975	Moss	Bernard Kops	Irene Shubik	Philip Saville	Warren Mitchell		
4 Nov 1975	84, Charing Cross Road	Helene Hanff & Hugh Whitemore	Mark Shivas	Mark Cullingham	Frank Finlay		Adapted from the book. Repeated 21 July 1977.
11 Nov 1975	Keep an Eye on Albert	Brian Glover	Ann Scott	Michael Tuchner	Susan Tracy		
18 Nov 1975	Children of the Sun	Michael O'Neill & Jeremy Seabrook	Ann Scott	Viktors Ritelis	Godfrey James		Missing. Final missing episode.
25 Nov 1975	After the Solo	John Challen	Ann Scott	Moira Armstrong	Leonard Rossiter		
2 Dec 1975	Through the Night	Trevor Griffiths	Ann Scott	Michael Lindsay-Hogg	Alison Steadman		Repeated 4 August 1977.
9 Dec 1975	A Passage to England	Leon Griffiths	Kenith Trodd	John Mackenzie	Colin Welland	Included on the Play for Today Vol. 1 BFI Blu-ray set	Repeated 25 August 1977.
16 Dec 1975	Rumpole of the Bailey	John Mortimer	Irene Shubik	John Gorrie	Leo McKern	DVD release by Acorn	Repeated 16 May 1993, and on BBC4 18 and 19 January 2009. Spun off as a long-running series on ITV (Thames Television).
6 Jan 1976	The Other Woman	Watson Gould	David Rose	Michael Simpson	Jane Lapotaire		From BBC Birmingham
13 Jan 1976	Nuts in May	Mike Leigh	David Rose	Mike Leigh	Roger Sloman	Included on the Mike Leigh at the BBC DVD set	From BBC Birmingham. Repeated 11 August 1977, on BBC2 5 September 1982 and 27 December 1993, and on BBC4 19 April 2009, 20 July 2010, 6 May 2012 and 1 December 2014.
20 Jan 1976	Doran's Box	Eric Coltart	David Rose	Matthew Robinson	Peter Eyre		From BBC Birmingham. Exists only as a domestic video recording.
27 Jan 1976	Packman's Barn	Alick Rowe	David Rose	Chris Menaul	John Barrett		From BBC Birmingham
3 Feb 1976	A Story to Frighten the Children	John Hopkins	Graeme McDonald	Herbert Wise	Geoffrey Palmer		
10 Feb 1976	The Happy Hunting Ground	Tom Hadaway	Anne Head	Brian Parker	Neil Phillips		
17 Feb 1976	Jumping Bean Bag	Robin Chapman	Rosemary Hill	Alan Cooke	David Dixon		
24 Feb 1976	Clay, Smeddum and Greenden	Lewis Grassic Gibbon & Bill Craig	Pharic MacLaren	Moira Armstrong	Fulton Mackay		Trilogy by Lewis Grassic Gibbon, dramatised by Bill Craig; from BBC Scotland. Repeated 18 August 1977.
2 Mar 1976	Love Letters on Blue Paper	Arnold Wesker	Graeme McDonald	Waris Hussein	Patrick Troughton		
9 Mar 1976	Willie Rough	Bill Bryden	Pharic MacLaren	Bob McIntosh	James Grant		Adapted from the stage play.
16 Mar 1976	Tiptoe Through the Tulips	Beryl Bainbridge	Kenith Trodd	Claude Whatham	Rosemary Leach		
23 Mar 1976	The Peddler	E. A. Whitehead	Graeme McDonald	Claude Whatham	John Hurt		
30 Mar 1976	Early Struggles	Peter Prince	Graeme McDonald	Stephen Frears	Paul Nicholas		
6 Apr 1976	Double Dare	Dennis Potter	Kenith Trodd	John Mackenzie	Alan Dobie		Repeated 28 July 1977, and on BBC4 6 February 2005.
Series 7
14 Sep 1976	Bar Mitzvah Boy	Jack Rosenthal	Graeme McDonald	Michael Tuchner	Jeremy Steyn	Included on the Play for Today Vol. 3 BFI Blu-ray set & the Jack Rosenthal at the BBC DVD set.	BAFTA Best Single Play and Best Writer awards, 1976. Repeated 6 May 1977, 28 February 1978 and 23 June 1997, and on BBC4 18 July 2004 and 17 March 2005.
21 Sep 1976	Bet Your Life	Leslie Blair	Graeme McDonald	Leslie Blair	Reginald Stewart		
28 Sep 1976	Rocky Marciano Is Dead	Bernard Kops	Graeme McDonald	Graham Evans	Ron Moody		
12 Oct 1976	The Elephants' Graveyard	Peter McDougall	Graeme McDonald	John Mackenzie	Billy Connolly, Jon Morrison	Included on the Play for Today Vol .2 BFI Blu-ray set & The Peter McDougall Collection DVD set	Repeated 25 Jul 1978.
19 Oct 1976	Housewives' Choice	Roy Kendall	Kenith Trodd	Chris Thomson	Frances de la Tour		
26 Oct 1976	Your Man from Six Counties	Colin Welland	Kenith Trodd	Barry Davis	Donal McCann	Included on the Play for Today Vol. 1 BFI Blu-ray set	
2 Nov 1976	Buffet	Rhys Adrian	Graeme McDonald	Mike Newell	Tony Britton		
4 Jan 1977	Love on a Gunboat	Malcolm Bradbury	David Rose	Robert Knights	Stephen Moore		From BBC Birmingham
11 Jan 1977	The Kiss of Death	Mike Leigh	David Rose	Mike Leigh	David Threlfall	Included on the Mike Leigh at the BBC DVD set	From BBC Birmingham
18 Jan 1977	Our Flesh and Blood	Mike Stott	David Rose	Pedr James	Bernard Hill	Included on the Play for Today Vol. 1 BFI Blu-ray set	From BBC Birmingham. Repeated 29 August 1978.
25 Jan 1977	Do As I Say	Charles Wood	Graeme McDonald	Barry Davis	Angela Down		
15 Mar 1977	Spend, Spend, Spend!	Jack Rosenthal	Graeme McDonald	John Goldschmidt	Susan Littler	Included on the Jack Rosenthal at the BBC DVD set	Based on the book by Vivian Nicholson and Stephen Smith. BAFTA Best Single Play. Repeated 1 June 1978.
22 Mar 1977	A Photograph	John Bowen	Graeme McDonald	John Glenister	John Stride	Included on the Play for Today Vol. 1 BFI Blu-ray set	
12 Apr 1977	Gotcha	Barrie Keeffe	Margaret Matheson	Barry Davis	Philip Davis	Included on the Play for Today Vol. 2 BFI Blu-ray set	Double bill. Repeated 15 August 1978.
12 Apr 1977	Campion's Interview	Brian Clark	Margaret Matheson	Barry Davis	Julian Curry	Included on the Play for Today Vol. 2 BFI Blu-ray set	Double bill. Repeated 15 August 1978.
19 Apr 1977	A Choice of Evils	Jim Allen	Margaret Matheson	Jane Howell	Stephen Murray		
26 Apr 1977	The Country Party	Brian Clark	Mark Shivas	Barry Davis	Peter Barkworth		Sequel to The Saturday Party.
Series 8
18 Oct 1977	Stronger Than the Sun	Stephen Poliakoff	Margaret Matheson	Michael Apted	Francesca Annis		Repeated 21 February 1978, and on BBC4 21 January 2003, 14 May 2003 and 5 March 2006.
25 Oct 1977	Come the Revolution	Robin Chapman	Rosemary Hill	Michael Darlow	Vivian Pickles		
1 Nov 1977	Abigail's Party	Mike Leigh	Margaret Matheson	Mike Leigh	Alison Steadman	DVD release by BBC; also included on the Mike Leigh at the BBC DVD set	Adapted from the stage play. Repeated 7 August 1979, on BBC2 6 September 1982, 5 July 1992 and 1 November 1997, and on BBC4 26 June 2002, 11 August 2002, 28 October 2007, 17 December 2007, 7 November 2010, 21 March 2013, 24 November 2014, 14 October 2020 and 1 June 2022.
8 Nov 1977	Oy Vay Maria	Mary O'Malley	Margaret Matheson	Richard Loncraine	Cheryl Hall		
15 Nov 1977	Nipper	Barrie Keeffe	Margaret Matheson	Brian Farnham	Coral Atkins		
22 Nov 1977	One Day at a Time	Denis Cannan	Innes Lloyd	Ronald Wilson	Stephanie Cole		
29 Nov 1977	The Mayor's Charity	Henry Livings	Richard Broke	Mike Newell	Thora Hird	Included on the Play for Today Vol. 3 BFI Blu-ray set	
5 Dec 1977	Catchpenny Twist	Stewart Parker	Robert Knights		Sam Dale		Repeated 21 August 1979.
13 Dec 1977	Charades	Antonia Fraser	Pharic MacLaren	Roderick Graham	Jennifer Hilary		From BBC Scotland
20 Dec 1977	The Thin End of the Wedge	Sean McCarthy	Pharic MacLaren	John Black	Tom Marshall		From BBC Scotland
3 Jan 1978	Scully's New Year's Eve	Alan Bleasdale	David Rose	Michael Simpson	Andrew Schofield		From BBC Birmingham
10 Jan 1978	Licking Hitler	David Hare	David Rose	David Hare	Kate Nelligan		From BBC Birmingham. BAFTA Best Single Play. Repeated 31 July 1979.
17 Jan 1978	Red Shift	Alan Garner	David Rose	John Mackenzie	Stephen Petcher	BFI DVD	From BBC Birmingham. Adapted from the novel.
24 Jan 1978	The Spongers	Jim Allen	Tony Garnett	Roland Joffé	Christine Hargreaves	Included on the Play for Today Vol. 2 BFI Blu-ray set	Duration 105 minutes. Prix Italia 1978, Golden Award and Best Script at Prague 1978. Repeated 6 September 1979, and on BBC2 25 August 1993 and 17 July 1999.
31 Jan 1978	Destiny	David Edgar	Margaret Matheson	Mike Newell	Colin Jeavons		Adapted from the play. Duration 105 minutes. Repeated 14 August 1979.
7 Feb 1978	Our Day Out	Willy Russell	David Rose	Pedr James	Alun Armstrong	DVD release by Simply Media	First shown as a Play of the Week on BBC2, 28 December 1977. Repeated on BBC2 26 December 1979, and in 3 instalments under Scene, 14, 21 & 28 January 1994, and on BBC4 22 August 2008.
14 Feb 1978	The After Dinner Joke	Caryl Churchill	Margaret Matheson	Colin Bucksey	Paula Wilcox		
18 Apr 1978	Days of Hope: 1916 - Joining Up	Jim Allen	Tony Garnett	Ken Loach	Paul Copley	Included on the Ken Loach at the BBC DVD boxset	First shown 11 September 1975.
25 Apr 1978	Days of Hope: 1921 – Every Pit in Britain Is Idle	Jim Allen	Tony Garnett	Ken Loach	Paul Copley	Included on the Ken Loach at the BBC DVD boxset	First shown 18 September 1975.
2 May 1978	Days Of Hope: 1924 - A Miracle	Jim Allen	Tony Garnett	Ken Loach	Paul Copley	Included on the Ken Loach at the BBC DVD boxset	First shown 25 September 1975.
9 May 1978	Days Of Hope: 1926 - General Strike	Jim Allen	Tony Garnett	Ken Loach	Paul Copley	Included on the Ken Loach at the BBC DVD boxset	First shown 2 October 1975.
1 Aug 1978	The Price of Coal: Meet the People	Barry Hines	Tony Garnett	Ken Loach	Bobby Knutt	Included on the Ken Loach at the BBC DVD boxset	First shown 29 March 1977.
8 Aug 1978	The Price of Coal: Back to Reality	Barry Hines	Tony Garnett	Ken Loach	Bobby Knutt	Included on the Ken Loach at the BBC DVD boxset	First shown 5 April 1977.
22 Aug 1978	The Legion Hall Bombing	Caryl Churchill	Margaret Matheson	Roland Joffé	David Kelly		
Series 9
17 Oct 1978	Nina	Jehane Markham	Margaret Matheson	Alan Clarke	Jack Shepherd	Included in the Dissent & Disruption: Alan Clarke at the BBC Blu-ray set	
24 Oct 1978	Victims of Apartheid	Tom Clarke	Richard Eyre	Stuart Burge	John Kani	Included on the Play for Today Vol. 2 BFI Blu-ray set	
31 Oct 1978	A Touch of the Tiny Hacketts	John Esmonde & Bob Larbey	James Cellan Jones		Ray Brooks		
7 Nov 1978	Dinner at the Sporting Club	Leon Griffiths	Kenith Trodd	Brian Gibson	John Thaw	DVD release by Simply Media	
14 Nov 1978	Donal and Sally	James Duthie	Anne Head	Brian Parker	Gerard Kelly, Sylvestra Le Touzel		Best Direction, 1979 Prague International Television Festival. Repeated 8 July 1980.
21 Nov 1978	Sorry…	Václav Havel & Vera Blackwell	Innes Lloyd	Claude Whatham	Michael Crawford		Adapted and translated by Vera Blackwell from the Vaněk plays Private View (a.k.a. Unveiling) and Audience. Repeated 6 January 1990.
28 Nov 1978	Butterflies Don't Count	Wally K. Daly	Innes Lloyd	Kenneth Ives	Frank Mills		
5 Dec 1978	Soldiers Talking, Cleanly	Mike Stott	Richard Eyre	Alan Dossor	Bob Mason		
12 Dec 1978	One Bummer News Day	Andy McSmith	Richard Eyre	Michael Darlow	Simon Rouse		
2 Jan 1979	The Out of Town Boys	Ron Hutchinson	David Rose	Robert Knights	Joe Lynch		From BBC Birmingham
9 Jan 1979	Vampires	Dixie Williams	Tara Prem	John Goldschmidt	Peter Moran		From BBC Birmingham
16 Jan 1979	The Chief Mourner	John Elliot	David Rose		Richard Pasco		From BBC Birmingham
23 Jan 1979	Waterloo Sunset	Barrie Keeffe	Richard Eyre		Queenie Watts		Repeated 5 August 1980.
30 Jan 1979	Blue Remembered Hills	Dennis Potter	Kenith Trodd	Brian Gibson	Colin Welland	Included on the Helen Mirren at the BBC DVD set	BAFTA Best Single Play and Best Director 1979. Repeated on BBC2 30 May 1980 and 6 November 1986, and on BBC4 5 June 2008.
5 Feb 1979	Who's Who	Mike Leigh	Margaret Matheson	Mike Leigh	Simon Chandler	Included on the Mike Leigh at the BBC DVD set	Repeated on BBC2 7 September 1982.
13 Feb 1979	The Last Window Cleaner	Ron Hutchinson	Kenith Trodd	Bill Craske	Patrick Magee		
27 Feb 1979	Ploughman's Share	Douglas Dunn	Pharic MacLaren	Fiona Cumming	Duncan Brewster		From BBC Scotland
6 Mar 1979	Degree of Uncertainty	Alma Cullen	Pharic MacLaren	Paul Annett	Jennie Linden		From BBC Scotland
13 Mar 1979	Light	Tony Perrin	Richard Eyre	Jane Howell	Jim Norton		
10 Apr 1979	Coming Out	James Andrew Hall	Kenith Trodd	Carol Wiseman	Anton Rodgers	Included on the Play for Today Vol. 3 BFI Blu-ray set	Repeated on BBC2 13 June 1980.
24 Jul 1979	Don't Be Silly	Rachel Billington	Innes Lloyd	Kenneth Ives	Susan Fleetwood		Repeated 12 August 1980. Repeated on BBC4 10 November 2020.
Series 10
11 Oct 1979	Long Distance Information	Neville Smith	Richard Eyre	Stephen Frears	Neville Smith		Repeated on BBC2 4 October 1980.
18 Oct 1979	Cries from a Watchtower	Stephen Lowe	Richard Eyre	Giles Foster	Paul Copley		
25 Oct 1979	Comedians	Trevor Griffiths	Richard Eyre	Richard Eyre	Bill Fraser		Adapted from the stage play. Repeated 19 August 1980, and on BBC2 9 May 1993.
1 Nov 1979	Even Solomon	Andrew Taylor	Anne Head	Roger Bamford	Paul Henley		
8 Nov 1979	Just a Boys' Game	Peter McDougall	Richard Eyre	John Mackenzie	Frankie Miller, Ken Hutchison	Included on the Play for Today Vol. 2 BFI Blu-ray set; The Peter McDougall Collection DVD set	Repeated 26 August 1980. Repeated on BBC4 27 October 2020.
13 Nov 1979	Billy	G. F. Newman	Kenith Trodd	Charles Stewart	Jason Plenderleith		Repeated 10 November 1981.
29 Nov 1979	A Hole in Babylon	Jim Hawkins & Horace Ové	Graham Benson	Horace Ové	T-Bone Wilson	Included on the Play for Today Vol. 3 BFI Blu-ray set	Based on events of the 1975 Spaghetti House siege. Repeated on BBC2 27 June 1992. Repeated on BBC4 20 October 2020.
6 Dec 1979	The Slab Boys	John Byrne	Pharic MacLaren	Bob Hird	Gerard Kelly	DVD release by John Williams Productions	Adapted from the play.
13 Dec 1979	Katie: The Year of a Child	Ian Cullen & John Norton	John Norton	Barry Davis	Margaret Kelly		
20 Dec 1979	The Network	Stephen Fagan	Anne Head	Derek Lister	Anthony Bate		
2 Jan 1980	The Black Stuff	Alan Bleasdale	David Rose	Jim Goddard	Bernard Hill	Included on the Boys from the Black Stuff DVD set	The Black Stuff was commissioned and produced for the Play for Today strand in 1978, but not broadcast until 1980, as a one-off play on BBC2 (not billed as a Play for Today). However BBC sources today generally do refer to it as a Play for Today. Repeated on BBC1 30 July 1981, and on BBC4 19 September 2010 and 17 November 2020.
3 Jan 1980	Chance of a Lifetime	Robert Holman	Richard Eyre	Giles Foster	David Daker		Repeated 3 September 1981.
10 Jan 1980	Keep Smiling	Paul Joyce	David Rose	Paul Joyce	Stephen Moore		From BBC Birmingham
17 Jan 1980	Dreams of Leaving	David Hare	David Rose	David Hare	Bill Nighy		From BBC Birmingham
24 Jan 1980	Thicker Than Water	Brian Glover	Tara Prem	Alan Grint	Colin Douglas		From BBC Birmingham
31 Jan 1980	Murder Rap	Michael Hastings	Richard Eyre	Peter Duffell	Arthur Lovegrove		Repeated 13 August 1981.
7 Feb 1980	Instant Enlightenment Including VAT	Andrew Carr	Innes Lloyd	John Bruce	Simon Callow		Postponed from 22 November 1979.
14 Feb 1980	No Defence	Chris Kewbank	Innes Lloyd	Clive Halls	Illona Linthwaite		
21 Feb 1980	That Crazy Woman	David Hopkins	John Norton	Bill Craske	Zena Walker		
28 Feb 1980	A Gift from Nessus	William McIlvanney & Bill Craig	Pharic MacLaren	James Ormerod	Ken Hutchison		Novel by William McIlvanney, dramatised by Bill Craig; from BBC Scotland.
6 Mar 1980	Kate, the Good Neighbour	Peter Ransley	Richard Broke	John Bruce	Rachel Kempson		Repeated 27 August 1981.
13 Mar 1980	Buses	Geoffrey Case	Terry Coles	Tim King	Sebastian Abineri		
20 Mar 1980	Shadows on Our Skin	Jennifer Johnston & Derek Mahon	Kenith Trodd	Jim O'Brien	MacRea Clarke		Screenplay by Derek Mahon from the novel by Jennifer Johnston. Repeated 20 August 1981.
27 Mar 1980	Ladies	Carol Bunyan	Kenith Trodd	Durmuid Lawrence	Patsy Rowlands		
3 Apr 1980	The Vanishing Army	Robert Holles	Innes Lloyd	Richard Loncraine	Bill Paterson		First shown as a Play of the Week on BBC2 29 November 1978, and repeated on BBC1 28 August 1979.
10 Apr 1980	Not for the Likes of Us	Gilly Fraser	W. Stephen Gilbert	Tim King	Pam St Clement		From BBC Bristol
17 Apr 1980	The Executioner	Lionel Goldstein	Innes Lloyd	Kenneth Ives	Paul Rogers		
24 Apr 1980	The Imitation Game	Ian McEwan	Richard Eyre		Harriet Walter	DVD release by Simply Media	Repeated on BBC2 8 September 1981 and 12 May 1993.
14 May 1980	A Walk in the Forest	Jeremy Paul	Carol Robertson	Jack Gold	John Alderton		Repeated on BBC2 6 July 1980.
24 Jun 1980	On Giant's Shoulders	Marjorie Wallace, Michael Robson, William Humble & Anthony Simmons	Mark Shivas	Anthony Simmons	Judi Dench		Based on the book by Marjorie Wallace and Michael Robson, dramatised by William Humble and Anthony Simmons. First shown as a Play of the Week on BBC2, 28 March 1979. Repeated on BBC2 4 November 1986.
1 Jul 1980	Fearless Frank	Andrew Davies	Louis Marks	Colin Bucksey	Leonard Rossiter		First shown as a Play of the Week on BBC2, 4 October 1978.
Series 11
21 Oct 1980	Pasmore	Richard Eyre & David Storey	Ann Scott	Richard Eyre	Philip Jackson		Screenplay by Richard Eyre from the novel by David Storey. Repeated 10 August 1982.
28 Oct 1980	C_{2}H_{5}OH	David Turner	Innes Lloyd	James Cellan Jones	Dinsdale Landen		Title is the chemical formula for ethanol (alcohol).
4 Nov 1980	The Adventures of Frank: 1 – Everybody's Fiddling Something	John McGrath, Mark Brown, Mike O'Neill & Si Cowe	Richard Eyre	John McGrath	Mick Ford		A musical play in two parts by John McGrath, with music by Mark Brown and additional songs by Mike O'Neill and Si Cowe.
11 Nov 1980	The Adventures of Frank: 2 – Seeds of Ice	John McGrath, Mark Brown, Mike O'Neill & Si Cowe	Richard Eyre	John McGrath	Mick Ford		A musical play in two parts by John McGrath, with music by Mark Brown and additional songs by Mike O'Neill and Si Cowe.
18 Nov 1980	Minor Complications	Peter Ransley	Richard Broke	Moira Armstrong	Paola Dionisotti		Repeated 3 August 1982.
2 Dec 1980	Jude	Lesley Bruce	June Roberts	Bill Craske	Dorian Ford		
9 Dec 1980	The Flipside of Dominick Hide	Jeremy Paul & Alan Gibson	Chris Cherry	Alan Gibson	Peter Firth	DVD release by BBC	Repeated 7 December 1982, and on BBC4 26 February 2006, 20 May 2006 and 26 July 2008.
16 Dec 1980	Name for the Day	Colin Haydn Evans	Anne Head	Bill Bain	Richard O'Callaghan		
23 Dec 1980	Jessie	Bryan Forbes	Neil Zeiger	Bryan Forbes	Nanette Newman		Repeated 11 December 1982.
6 Jan 1981	Beyond the Pale	Les Blair	John Norton	Les Blair	Michael Maynard		
13 Jan 1981	The Muscle Market	Alan Bleasdale	Michael Wearing	Alan Dossor	Pete Postlethwaite		From BBC Birmingham
20 Jan 1981	A Brush with Mr. Porter on the Road to El Dorado	Don Haworth	Michael Wearing	Baz Taylor	Christopher Benjamin		From BBC Birmingham
3 Feb 1981	The Cause	Derek Lister	Terry Coles	Barry Davis	Jimmy Jewel		
10 Feb 1981	Beloved Enemy	David Leland & Charles Levinson	Keith Williams	Alan Clarke	Graham Crowden	Included in the Dissent & Disruption: Alan Clarke at the BBC Blu-ray set	Derived from the book Vodka Cola by Charles Levinson.
17 Feb 1981	The Kamikaze Ground Staff Reunion Dinner	Stewart Parker	Neil Zeiger	Baz Taylor	Peter Sallis		
24 Feb 1981	The Union	Tony Perrin	Innes Lloyd	Ronald Wilson	Ian Hogg		
3 Mar 1981	Sorry	Carol Bunyan	John Norton	Alistair Clark	Nicholas Ball		Repeated 17 August 1982.
10 Mar 1981	Shai Mala Khani; The Garland	H. O. Nazareth & Horace Ové	Peter Ansorge	Horace Ové	Tariq Yunus		From BBC Birmingham
17 Mar 1981	The Sin Bin	Tony Parker	June Roberts	John Gorrie	Kenneth Cranham		
24 Mar 1981	Before Water Lilies	Robert Marshall	Chris Cherry	Alan Charlesworth	Colin Bruce		
31 Mar 1981	Bavarian Night	Andrew Davies	Louis Marks	Jack Gold	Gawn Grainger		
7 Apr 1981	The Good Time Girls	Alan Clews	Pharic MacLaren	Gareth Davies	Anne Kristen		From BBC Scotland. Repeated 27 July 1982.
21 Apr 1981	Baby Talk	Nigel Williams	Anne Head	Derek Lister	Susan Littler		
28 Apr 1981	A Turn for the Worse	John Bill	John Norton	Bill Hays	Bernard Hill		
12 May 1981	Psy-Warriors	David Leland	June Roberts	Alan Clarke	Rosalind Ayres	Included in the Dissent & Disruption: Alan Clarke at the BBC Blu-ray set	Adapted from the play.
Series 12
20 Oct 1981	Country	Trevor Griffiths	Ann Scott	Richard Eyre	Leo McKern		Repeated on BBC2 26 May 1993. Repeated on BBC4 12 October 2020.
27 Oct 1981	London Is Drowning	Graham Williams	Chris Cherry	Martyn Friend	David Neal		
3 Nov 1981	A Room for the Winter	Rose Tremain	June Roberts	Jim Goddard	Jack Shepherd		
17 Nov 1981	No Visible Scar	Rosemary Davies	Innes Lloyd	Moira Armstrong	Barbara Flynn		
24 Nov 1981	Iris in the Traffic, Ruby in the Rain	Stewart Parker	June Roberts	John Bruce	Frances Tomelty		Repeated on BBC2 15 February 1989.
1 Dec 1981	Protest	Václav Havel & Vera Blackwell	Innes Lloyd	Alistair Clark	Nigel Hawthorne		Translated and adapted by Vera Blackwell from the play.
8 Dec 1981	United Kingdom	Jim Allen	Kenith Trodd	Roland Joffé	Colin Welland		
15 Dec 1981	P.Q. 17	Roger Milner & Captain Jack Broome	Innes Lloyd	Frank Cox	Richard Briers		From the book Convoy Is to Scatter by Captain Jack Broome.
22 Dec 1981	The Factory	David Hopkins	Innes Lloyd	Gerald Blake	Leonard Rossiter		
5 Jan 1982	England's Greens and Peasant Land	Rita May	John Norton	Jim Hill	Ron Delta		
12 Jan 1982	A Cotswold Death	Tony Bicat	Michael Wearing	Tony Bicat	Ian Richardson		
19 Jan 1982	Under the Skin	Janey Preger	Peter Ansorge	Tony Smith	Jacqueline Tong		
26 Jan 1982	Commitments	Dusty Hughes	Ann Scott	Richard Wilson	Kevin McNally		Adapted from the play. Exists only as a domestic video recording.
2 Feb 1982	Life After Death	Rachel Billington	Innes Lloyd	Anthony Simmons	Dorothy Tutin		
9 Feb 1982	The Silly Season	Stephen Mulrine	Pharic MacLaren	Alex Marshall	Derek Anders		From BBC Scotland
16 Feb 1982	Too Late to Talk to Billy	J. Graham Reid	Neil Zeiger and Chris Parr	Paul Seed	James Ellis		First of the Billy trilogy. Repeated 3 May 1983.Repeated on BBC4 5 October 2022.
23 Feb 1982	Willie's Last Stand	Jim Allen	Alan Seymour	Brian Parker	Paul Freeman		
9 Mar 1982	Tishoo	Brian Thompson	John Norton	Gerald Blake	Paul Daneman		
16 Mar 1982	Home, Sweet Home	Mike Leigh	Louis Marks	Mike Leigh	Timothy Spall	Included on the Mike Leigh at the BBC DVD set	
23 Mar 1982	A Sudden Wrench	Paula Milne	Alan Shallcross	Jon Amiel	Rosemary Martin		Repeated on BBC2 18 March 1983.
30 Mar 1982	Eve Set the Balls of Corruption Rolling	Marcella Evaristi	Bob McIntosh	David Maloney	Debbie Wheeler		From BBC Scotland. Pye Award for Best Writer New to Television, 1982
6 Apr 1982	Whistling Wally	Wally K. Daly	Innes Lloyd	Gerald Blake	Kenneth Farrington		
Series 13
19 Oct 1982	Soft Targets	Stephen Poliakoff	Kenith Trodd	Charles Sturridge	Helen Mirren	Included on the Helen Mirren at the BBC DVD set	Repeated on BBC4 25 Jan 2003.
26 Oct 1982	3 Minute Heroes	Leslie Stewart	Colin Rogers	Michael Custance	Philip Freeman		From BBC Birmingham
2 Nov 1982	The Remainder Man	Philip Martin	Ann Scott	Richard Wilson	Sheila Hancock		
9 Nov 1982	Intensive Care	Alan Bennett	Innes Lloyd	Gavin Millar	Alan Bennett		Repeated on BBC2 9 August 1992.
16 Nov 1982	A Mother Like Him	Frances Galleymore	Alan Shallcross	Baz Taylor	Perry Fenwick		
23 Nov 1982	John David	Paula Milne	Brenda Reid	Rodney Bennett	Gwen Watford		
30 Nov 1982	Aliens	Alan Clews	Bob McIntosh	David Maloney	Anthony Higgins		From BBC Scotland
14 Dec 1982	Another Flip for Dominick	Jeremy Paul & Alan Gibson	Chris Cherry	Alan Gibson	Peter Firth	BBC DVD release	Repeated on BBC4 27 May 2006 and 2 August 2008.
1 Mar 1983	Last Love	Reg Gadney	Alan Shallcross	Nicholas Renton	Elizabeth Sellars		
8 Mar 1983	Gates of Gold	Maurice Leitch	Chris Parr	Jon Amiel	Peter Bayliss		
15 Mar 1983	Wayne and Albert	David Hopkins	Alan Shallcross	Sarah Pia Anderson	Arthur English		
29 Mar 1983	Atlantis	Peter Terson	Colin Rogers	Les Chatfield	Frank Middlemass		From BBC Birmingham
5 Apr 1983	The Last Term	Raymond Hitchcock	Rosemary Hill	Philip Bonham-Carter	Christopher Villiers		
12 Apr 1983	Reluctant Chickens	David Cregan	Roger Gregory	Gareth Davies	Patrick Troughton		From BBC Birmingham
19 Apr 1983	Shall I Be Mother?	Peter Ransley	Anne Head	Ronald Wilson	Eva Griffith		
26 Apr 1983	The Falklands Factor	Don Shaw	Louis Marks	Colin Bucksey	Donald Pleasence		
10 May 1983	A Matter of Choice for Billy	Graham Reid	Neil Zeiger	Paul Seed	Kenneth Branagh		Second of the Billy trilogy.Repeated on BBC4 5 October 2022.
Series 14
14 Feb 1984	Young Shoulders	John Wain & Robert Smith	Bernard Krichefski	Silvio Narizzano	David Horovitch		Screenplay by Robert Smith and John Wain of the novel.
21 Feb 1984	A Coming to Terms for Billy	Graham Reid	Chris Parr	Paul Seed	Kenneth Branagh		Third of the Billy trilogy. From BBC Northern Ireland. Repeated on BBC4 12 October 2022.
28 Feb 1984	Z for Zachariah	Anthony Garner	Neil Zeiger	Anthony Garner	Anthony Andrews		Adapted from the novel. Duration 120 minutes.
6 Mar 1984	Moving on the Edge	Rose Tremain	Rosemary Hill	Anthony Garner	Eleanor Bron		
13 Mar 1984	Desert of Lies	Howard Brenton	Michael Wearing	Piers Haggard	Cherie Lunghi		
20 Mar 1984	Hard Feelings	Doug Lucie	Michael Wearing	Michael Bradwell	Frances Barber		Adapted from the play.
27 Mar 1984	Under the Hammer	Stephen Fagan	Michael Wearing	Richard Wilson	Peter Vaughan		
3 Apr 1984	King	Barrie Keeffe	Michael Wearing	Tony Smith	Thomas Baptiste		
10 Apr 1984	Rainy Day Women	David Pirie	Michael Wearing	Ben Bolt	Charles Dance		Repeated on BBC2 8 September 1990.
17 Jul 1984	Dog Ends	Richard Harris	Andrée Molyneux	Carol Wiseman	Leonard Rossiter		
24 Jul 1984	The Groundling and the Kite	Leonard Preston	Colin Rogers	Peter Jefferies	John Duttine		From BBC Birmingham
31 Jul 1984	The Cry	Derek Mahon & Chris Menaul from a story by John Montague	Chris Parr	Chris Menaul	Adrian Dunbar		Adapted from a story by John Montague.
14 Aug 1984	It Could Happen to Anybody	Hugh McManus	Bob McIntosh	Laurence Moody	Ann Scott-Jones		From BBC Scotland
21 Aug 1984	Only Children	Judy Forrest	Alan Shallcross	Michael Rolfe	Charlotte Cornwell		
28 Aug 1984	The Amazing Miss Stella Estelle	Leslie Stewart	Rob Walker	John Davis	Elaine Lordan		
Postponed broadcasts
25 Aug 1987	Brimstone & Treacle	Dennis Potter	Kenith Trodd	Barry Davis	Denholm Elliott	BBC DVD release	Postponed from 6 April 1976. Repeated on BBC2 5 September 1998 and on BBC4 2 January 2005.
27 Jul 1991	Scum	Roy Minton	Margaret Matheson	Alan Clarke	Ray Winstone	Included in the Dissent & Disruption: Alan Clarke at the BBC Blu-ray set	Postponed from 8 November 1977.
Unbroadcast	Pillion	Paul Copley	Richard Eyre	Keith Evans			Recorded in 1979 but never transmitted.

=== Channel 5 relaunch ===
Original air date	Title	Authors	Producer	Director	Lead actor(s)	Home media	Notes
Series 1
13 Nov 2025	Never Too Late	Simon Warne, Lydia Marchant		Sara Harrak	Anita Dobson, Nigel Havers		
20 Nov 2025	Big Winners	Martha Watson Allpress		Emma Turner	Sue Johnston, Paul Copley		
4 Dec 2025	A Knock at the Door	David Whitehouse		Daniel Rands	Alan Davies, Nikki Amuka-Bird		
11 Dec 2025	Special Measures	Lee Thompson		Jack McLoughlin	Jessica Plummer, Shaun Fagan		

== Home media ==
The BFI have released three box sets of the series on Blu-ray, each consisting of various plays from throughout the show's run. Volume 1 contains seven plays broadcast between 1970 and 77; The Lie (1970), Shakespeare or Bust (1973), Back of Beyond (1974), Passage to England (1975), Your Man from Six Counties (1976), Our Flesh and Blood (1977), and A Photograph (1977). Five of the productions were remastered using the original 16mm film negatives which still exist in the BBC Archives.

Volume 2 contains seven plays broadcast between 1972 and 79; Stocker's Copper (1972), The Elephants' Graveyard (1976), Gotcha / Campion's Interview (1977), The Spongers (1978), Victims of Apartheid (1978), and Just a Boys' Game (1979).

Volume 3, released on 21 March 2022, contains six plays broadcast between 1971 and 79; Edna, the Inebriate Woman (1971), Just Another Saturday (1975), Bar Mitzvah Boy (1976), The Mayor's Charity (1977), Coming Out (1979), and A Hole in Babylon (1979).

Robin Redbreast, Penda's Fen, Abigail's Party, Our Day Out, The Imitation Game and several others have received standalone releases on DVD and Blu-ray, whilst others have been released on compilation DVDs with the creators' other works.

== Bibliography ==
- Evans, Jeff. The Penguin TV Companion (1st ed.). London: Penguin Books. 2001. ISBN 0-140-51467-8.
- Shubik, Irene (2000). Play for Today - The evolution of television drama (2 ed.). Manchester: Manchester University Press. ISBN 0719056861.
- Vahimagi, Tise. British Television: An Illustrated Guide. Oxford. Oxford University Press / British Film Institute. 1994. ISBN 0-19-818336-4.
- Farquhar, Simon. Play for Today: The First Year. 2021. ISBN 9781716179136.
