= A Gift from Nessus =

1968 novel by William McIlvanney

First edition (publ. Eyre and Spottiswoode)

A Gift from Nessus is a novel by the Scottish writer William McIlvanney published in 1968 and republished in 2014.

The novel in 1968 was awarded a Scottish Arts Council Book Award and it was adapted by Bill Craig for the BBC series Play for Today in 1980.
