= Maurice Colbourne (actor born 1939) =

English actor (1939–1989)

- Born: Roger Middleton; 24 September 1939; Sheffield, West Riding of Yorkshire, England
- Died: 4 August 1989 (aged 49); Dinan, Brittany, France
- Education: Royal Central School of Speech and Drama
- Occupation: Actor
- Years active: 1970–1989
- Spouse: Chan Lian Si (m. 1979)
- Children: 1

Roger Middleton (24 September 1939 – 4 August 1989), known professionally as Maurice Colbourne, was an English stage and television actor who starred as Tom Howard in the BBC television series Howards' Way. He is also known for roles in other television series such as Gangsters, The Onedin Line, The Day of the Triffids and Doctor Who. He was usually cast as a villain in his career.

== Early life ==
Roger Middleton was born in Sheffield, three weeks after Britain and France declared war on Germany upon the outbreak of the Second World War, and studied acting at the Central School of Speech and Drama in London. He took his stage name from that of an earlier actor called Maurice Colbourne, who shared the same birthday (in a different year) as his.

== Career ==
In 1972, Colbourne co-founded, together with Michael Irving and Guy Sprung, the Half Moon Theatre near Aldgate, east London. This was a successful, radical theatre company, performing initially in an 80-seat disused synagogue in Half Moon Passage, E1. In 1985, the company moved to a converted chapel in Mile End Road, near Stepney Green. He performed in many productions at Half Moon Theatre, including In the Jungle of the Cities, Will Wat, If Not, What Will?, Heroes of the Iceberg Hotel, Sawdust Caesar, Dan Dare and Chaste Maid in Cheapside. He also directed several productions, including Silver Tassie, Alkestis, The Shoemakers and Pig Bank. He returned in 1979 to perform in Guys and Dolls.

Colbourne first became well known when he played the lead role of John Kline in a BBC drama series, Gangsters, from 1975–78, and afterwards appeared regularly on television. This included a guest appearance in a 1977 episode of Van der Valk, "Everybody Does It". He played Charles Marston, the love interest of Lady Fogarty, in the seventh series of The Onedin Line screened from 22 July to 23 September 1979. He played a mercenary in an episode of the Return of the Saint called "Duel in Venice". He played the character Jack Coker in the BBC's television miniseries adaptation of John Wyndham's The Day of the Triffids (1981). He also twice appeared in Doctor Who as the character Lytton (in Resurrection of the Daleks (1984) and Attack of the Cybermen (1985)).

Colbourne played lead character Tom Howard in 61 episodes of the successful BBC television drama Howards' Way from 1985 to 1989. During a break in filming of the fifth series, he died aged 49 from a heart attack while renovating a holiday home in Dinan, Brittany, France, leaving behind his wife of 10 years Chan Lian Si, and their daughter Clara. Howard's Way continued to the end of series five and for a sixth series, to tie up the storylines, with Colbourne's character being written out of the scripts.

== Filmography ==
Year	Title	Role	Notes
1970	Cry of the Banshee	Villager	
1970	Times For		
1976	Escape from the Dark (aka The Littlest Horse Thieves)	Luke Armstrong	
1977	The Duellists	Tall Second	
1979	Bloodline	Jon Swinton	
1980	Hawk the Slayer	Axe Man 1	
1980	Dead Man's Kit	Lt Commander Kohbal	
1981	Venom	Sampson	

== Television ==
Year	Title	Role	Notes
1975	Play for Today	John Kline	Episode: Gangsters
1975	Churchill's People	Dr. Dredge	Episode: "A Bill of Mortality"
1976-1978	Gangsters	John Kline	12 episodes
1977	Van der Valk	Nick Scholtz	Episode: "Everybody Does It"
1978	Return of the Saint	Jed Blacket	Episode: "Duel in Venice"
1979	The Onedin Line	Charles Marston	Six episodes
1980	Armchair Thriller	Lieutenant Commander Kobahl	Episode: "Dead Man's Kit"
1980	Shoestring	Priest	Episode: "The Dangerous Game"
1980	Strangers	John Rutter	Two episodes
1981	The Day of the Triffids	Jack Coker	Four episodes
1983	Johnny Jarvis	Jake	Mini-series
1984-1985	Doctor Who	Commander Gustave Lytton	Serials Resurrection of the Daleks and Attack of the Cybermen
1985	Hitler's SS: Portrait in Evil	SS Officer	TV Movie
1985-1989	Howards' Way	Tom Howard	61 episodes

== Theatre ==
Year	Title	Role	Notes
1972	In the Jungle of Cities	John Garga	Half Moon Theatre
1972	Alkestis	Herakles	Half Moon Theatre
1972	Will Wat, If Not, What Will?	John Ball	Half Moon Theatre
1972	Dan Dare	Sondar/Treen	Half Moon Theatre
1972	Punch Gorilla		Half Moon Theatre
1972	The Silver Tassie	Director	Half Moon Theatre
1972	Sawdust Caesar	Narrator/Genie of the Lamp/Third Conspirator	Half Moon Theatre
1973	Ripper!		Half Moon Theatre
1973	Heroes of the Iceberg Hotel	Policeman/Chairman	Half Moon Theatre
1973	The Shoemakers	Sajetan	Half Moon Theatre
1973	Get Off My Back		Half Moon Theatre
1973	Dick	Tom King	Half Moon Theatre
1973	A Chaste Maid in Cheapside	Director	Half Moon Theatre
1974	The Pig-Bank	Director	Half Moon Theatre
1974	Henry IV, Part 1 and Part 2	John Falstaff	Half Moon Theatre
1974	Saint Joan of the Stockyards	Meat Traders/Communist Leader	Half Moon Theatre
1974	The Hammers		Half Moon Theatre
1974	Stakeout/Homeworker		Half Moon Theatre
1979	Guys and Dolls	Nathan Detroit	Half Moon Theatre
1980	Tom Fool	Translator	Half Moon Theatre
