= Larry Dann =

English actor (born 1941)

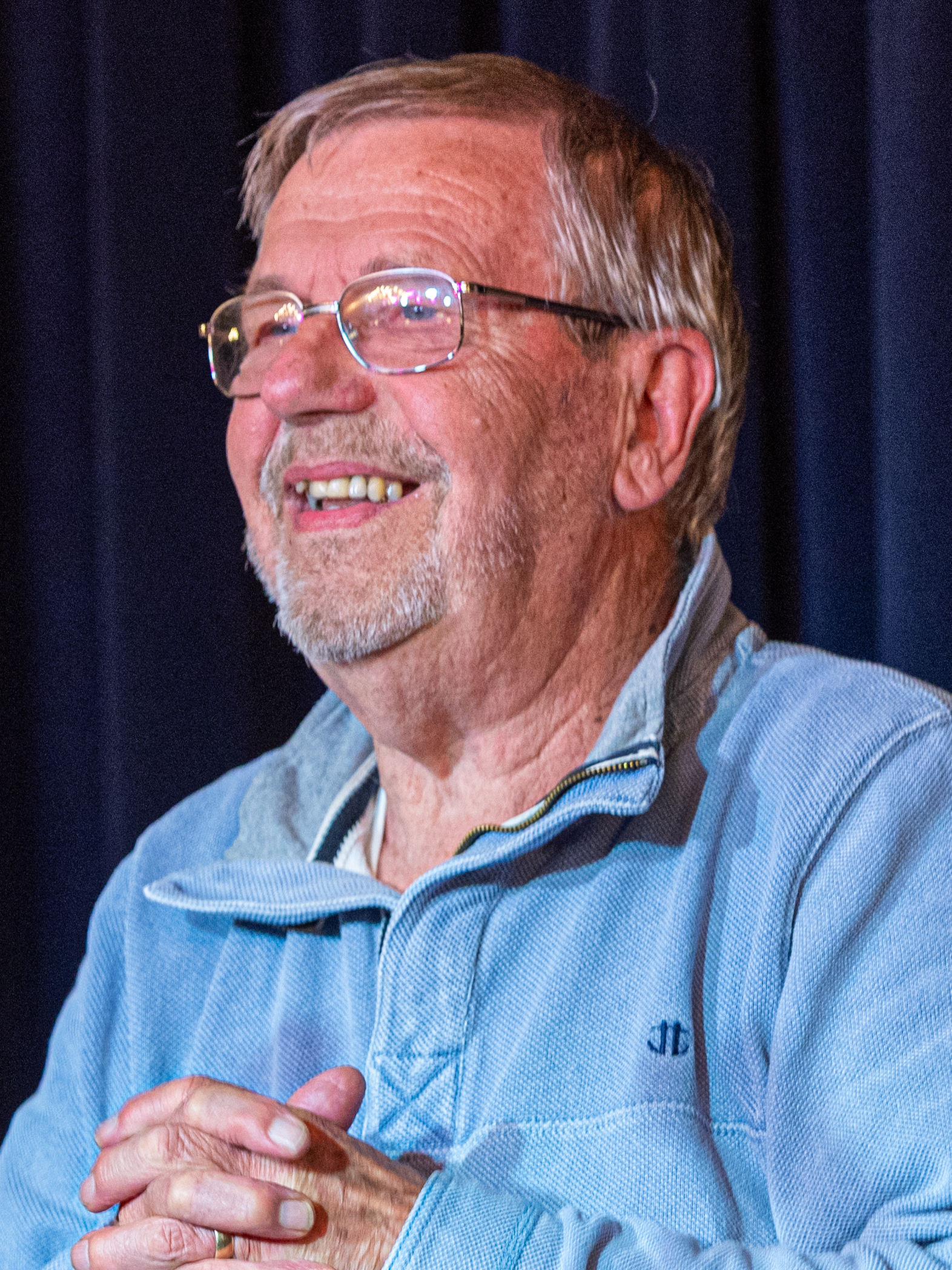
Dann at the 2024 Chiswick Book Festival

Larry Dann (born 4 May 1941 in London, England) is a British film and television actor.

His acting career began by a fluke, with "a chance knock at the door looking for kids to work in films." He made his film debut age five in Adam and Evelyne (1946) with Jean Simmons and Stewart Granger, and worked as an extra before training at the Corona Stage Academy. As a youngster he had a cameo playing a schoolboy in Carry On Teacher (1959), and appeared in two films with Sir Norman Wisdom, Trouble in Store (1953) and The Bulldog Breed (1960). He later rejoined the famous Carry On series of films for Carry On Behind (1975), Carry On England (1976) and Carry On Emmannuelle (1978). His other film roles included What a Crazy World (1963), All Neat in Black Stockings (1968), The Body Stealers (1969), Before Winter Comes, (1969), Our Miss Fred (1972) Ghost Story (1974) and The Bunker (1981).

From 1984 to 1992, he played Sergeant Alec Peters in 227 episodes of the ITV police series The Bill. In 2020, Dann shared his memories of his early work on The Bill for the book Witness Statements: Making The Bill (Series 1-3). A follow-up volume, Witness Statements: Making The Bill (1988) was published in 2022, also featuring memories from Dann about his time as Sgt. Peters during the earliest half-hour episodes of the programme.

Dann joined the Theatre Workshop in 1962 and appeared in numerous plays directed by Joan Littlewood including Oh, What a Lovely War! in London, Paris and New York.

In 2023, Dann wrote his autobiography Oh, What A Lovely Memoir, published by Devonfire Books.
