= Les Misérables (1967 TV series) =

- Genre: Historical drama
- Based on: Les Misérables by Victor Hugo
- Written by: Giles Cooper; Harry Green
- Directed by: Alan Bridges
- Starring: Frank Finlay
- Country of origin: United Kingdom
- Original language: English
- No. of series: 1
- No. of episodes: 10

Production
- Producer: Campbell Logan
- Running time: 25 minutes
- Production company: BBC

Original release
- Network: BBC One
- Release: 22 October – 24 December 1967

Les Misérables is a 1967 television series of ten episodes of twenty-five minutes, produced by BBC Television and broadcast from 22 October 1967.

The cast included Frank Finlay as Jean Valjean and Michael Napier Brown as the barber. The film series was produced in colour, with mono sound, though there were few colour television sets available at the time in the UK.

Although the original master videotapes were wiped, 35mm film copies of the series survived the wiping, and was released by Simply Media onto DVD in 2019.

== Selected cast ==
- Frank Finlay as Jean Valjean
- Anthony Bate as Insp. Javert
- Alan Rowe as Thenardier
- Lesley Roach as young Cosette
- Judy Parfitt as Mme. Thenardier
- Elizabeth Counsell as Eponine
- Cavan Kendall as Enjolras
- Vivian MacKerrell as Marius
- Michele Dotrice as Fantine and Cosette
- Derek Lamden as Gavroche
- Eileen Moore as Mme. Victurnien
- Frederick Treves as Yves
- Finlay Currie as Bishop of Digne
- Norman Mitchell as Prefect
- Michael Robbins as Gribier
- Clifford Rose as Champmathieu
- Enid Lorimer as Baptistine

== See also ==
- Adaptations of Les Misérables
