= Secrets (Black and Blue) =

1973 British television play by Michael Palin and Terry Jones

"Secrets" is a 1973 BBC Television play by Michael Palin and Terry Jones of one-hour duration, starring Warren Mitchell as the owner of a chocolate factory. The play was part of a series called Black and Blue, which featured black and blue (saucy) comedy.

== Story ==
A man working high-up on a very tall chocolate mixing vat tries to lean over the vat but overbalances and without being noticed falls in; his two colleagues fall in shortly after him. This now-contaminated chocolate is processed and packed ready for distribution along with the normal production. It is only much later that quality control finds a chocolate containing a thumb to confirm the missing man's gruesome fate.

The chocolate company is suffering poor sales and intends to send out chocolates with market research questionnaires to different parts of the country to get customer feedback. Before anyone had missed the worker and shut down the production line to investigate matters, the contaminated chocolates were boxed and sent out with normal production to Worthing. Despite attempts to recover the suspect chocolates, they had all been sold and eaten.

The returned questionnaires were examined carefully to find unsurprising confirmation that people did not like the factory's chocolates, except for a group of customers who had been pleasantly surprised by the taste of the new chocolate. Comments like "Wonderful Meaty Flavour" were common and customers were keen to purchase more of the same.

Faced with this dilemma, the factory tried to respond to the apparent demand for meat in its chocolates by blending beef with its chocolate recipe, leading to scenes with loud "mooing and bangs" as workers attempted to process an unfortunate cow. Further market research results were disastrous. There was only one possible conclusion, that the public liked the taste of human flesh. But this solution was not socially acceptable, so they could not "just" include people in their chocolates.

Faced with ever-increasing financial disaster, the factory decided to start a campaign designed to try to alter attitudes to what was effectively cannibalism. They admitted what the source of the new flavour was and attempted to persuade people to donate their bodies for inclusion in the new flavour chocolate, so there would be a fresh supply of "recycling" corpses to flavour the new chocolates.

This eventually proved a great success and the factory flourished to the extent that the chocolates had major advertising slots on TV, culminating in an advert which featured a "Game Show Prize" style of conveyor belt, where instead of prizes, the conveyor passed across the TV screen loaded with a selection of deceased bishops and judges and other notable persons, while viewers were reminded by voice and logo that "Only the Best People Go into Our Chocolates".

Soylent Green, which took an altogether more serious view of a similar subject, was released in the same year. A feature film remake of Secrets, Consuming Passions, was released in 1988.

== Preservation and DVD release ==
The original videotape of the play was wiped by the BBC following a large number of complaints after the first broadcast. The only known surviving version is a VHS copy of a half-inch reel-to-reel domestic videotape recording made by producer Mark Shivas from the master tape at the BBC and transferred onto VHS in the 1980s. In 2004 this version was included as an extra on the Region 2 DVD of Palin and Jones's series Ripping Yarns. The recording is fuzzy and grainy, and frequently flickers and rolls.
