= Bar Mitzvah Boy =

- Play for Today episode
- Episode no.: Series 7 Episode 1
- Directed by: Michael Tuchner
- Written by: Jack Rosenthal
- Original air date: 14 September 1976

Episode chronology
← Previous "Double Dare"	Next → "Bet Your Life"

"Bar Mitzvah Boy" is the first episode of the seventh season of the BBC anthology series Play for Today. The television play was originally broadcast on 14 September 1976. It was written by Jack Rosenthal, directed by Michael Tuchner and produced by Graeme MacDonald.

Starring Jeremy Steyn, Kim Clifford, Mark Herman, Adrienne Posta, Maria Charles, Pamela Manson, Bernard Spear and Cyril Shaps, the play tells the story of a young Jewish boy, Eliott Green (Steyn), in a lower-middle-class family living in suburban north east London of the 1970s, and the apprehensions the boy feels over his forthcoming bar mitzvah. Meanwhile, the family prepares for the celebration, preoccupied with their own preparations for the bar mitzvah.

== Reception ==
Programme notes for a Boston Jewish Film Festival screening in 2004 hailed the play as "a BBC classic... this bittersweet comedy about a British boy's upcoming Bar Mitzvah features a strong sense of time and place [and] stellar acting", while the British Film Institute's website describes it as "a simple tale made memorable by genius writing and sympathetic performances."

In 1977, "Bar Mitzvah Boy" won the British Academy Television Award for Best Single Play, and in 2000 it was placed 56th in a BFI poll of the 100 Greatest British Television Programmes of the 20th century, voted on by industry professionals. The play is available on DVD with Rosenthal's other BBC work. It was also released on Blu-ray as part of the BFI's Play for Today Volume 3 box set.

== See also ==
- Sixty Six
