= Ghost Story (1974 film) =

1974 British film by Stephen Weeks

- DVD cover
- Directed by: Stephen Weeks
- Written by: Philip Norman; Rosemary Sutcliff; Stephen Weeks
- Produced by: Stephen Weeks
- Starring: Marianne Faithfull; Barbara Shelley; Larry Dann; Murray Melvin; Vivian MacKerrell
- Edited by: Jon Costelloe
- Music by: Ron Geesin
- Production company: Stephen Weeks Company
- Distributed by: Nationwide Distributors Ltd.
- Release date: 19 March 1974 (United Kingdom)
- Running time: 89 minutes
- Country: United Kingdom
- Language: English

Ghost Story (also known as Madhouse Mansion and Asylum of Blood) is a 1974 British mystery film directed by Stephen Weeks and starring Marianne Faithfull, Leigh Lawson, Larry Dann and Anthony Bate. It was written by Philip Norman, Rosemary Sutcliff and Weeks, with music composed by Ron Geesin.

The film features a rare performance from actor Vivian MacKerrell, who was later the inspiration for Withnail in Bruce Robinson's Withnail and I (1987).

== Plot ==
During the 1930s, three privileged old university friends gather for the week-end in an old country house located in a sprawling British estate. In fact McFadyen, who has recently inherited the estate, invites his two college acquaintances Talbot and Duller ostensibly for a week-end of game hunting. Duller, who appears to have an interest in the supernatural from a more scientific perspective, is sullen and rude, though an excellent shot, while Talbot is easygoing but puzzled as to why he was asked along, especially when his colleagues continually mock and ridicule him. As soon as they arrive, personalities clash, petty arguments ensue and the gloomy environment starts to wear on everyone's nerves. To make matters worse, McFayden neglects to mention that the place might be haunted. During the night, Talbot begins to have strange hallucinations involving a creepy porcelain doll and the former occupants of the mansion.

Talbot finds himself transported back in time, bearing witness to the trials and tribulations of a young woman named Sophy who once resided in the house. As the story progresses, the tenuous ties that bind the men together begin to unravel and the strange visions begin to become more vivid until they threaten to drive Talbot mad. It turns out to be haunted by the previous occupants, though only Talbot can see them. Finally, McFadyen admits that he invited Talbot and Duller because he had heard rumours that the house was haunted and he chose them both as likely subjects to draw any spirits out in the open. As the visions become more frequent and detailed, Talbot is thrust into a strange supernatural realm of incest, arson and madness from which escape is impossible: the doll claims the lives of Talbot and McFadyen while Duller, who leaves the estate early in a taxi, seems to be driven not to the train station but into the past to become an inmate of the nearby insane asylum which was destroyed by fire years before.

== Cast ==
- Anthony Bate as Dr. Borden
- Larry Dann as Talbot
- Marianne Faithfull as Sophy Kwykwer
- Sally Grace as girl
- Penelope Keith as Rennie
- Leigh Lawson as Robert
- Vivian MacKerrell as Duller
- Murray Melvin as McFayden
- Barbara Shelley as matron

== Production ==
Although set in England, the film was almost entirely shot on location in India, much of it at Bangalore Palace, owned by the Maharajah of Mysore.

== Reception ==
The Monthly Film Bulletin wrote: "Ultimately adding up to a rather neat and engaging horror tale, Ghost Story begins somewhat less auspiciously as a slightly strained genteel comedy of manners. The bumbling good humour of Talbot colliding with the more snobbish university sensibilities of Duller and McFayden over such matters as the preparation of jam sandwiches is groaningly familiar and overextended drawing-room stuff, made less palatable by the overplaying of Larry Dann (who gets much better as the film progresses) and the oily Dracula-like affectations of Murray Melvin, which comprise an equally illusory red herring about where the movie seems to be headed. But once the lengthy "ghost" flashbacks get under way and the intrigue divides into a double-plot – a sort of poor man's Céline et Julie vont en bateau without the formal doubling, with Talbot figuring strangely and effectively as an unseen witness of the various events – the film gradually arrives at a style and direction of its own. ... Ghost Story accumulates a few respectable tremors once character generally gives way to plot and the skills of the art director (Peter Young) and cameraman (Peter Hurst) are permitted to take the foreground, as in the imaginatively lit night scenes at the asylum. ...Otherwise, a graceful use of period detail and odd locations ... help to make Ghost Story a competent foray into supernatural territory, with lyrical intimations of an irredeemable past of incest and madness. If only this lyricism were more substantially linked with the elaborate machinery that sets the story going, Stephen Weeks might have wound up with a minor classic on his hands."

== Legacy ==
In 2023, actor Larry Dann dedicated a chapter of his autobiography Oh, What A Lovely Memoir to the making of the film.
