= Gangsters (TV series) =

British TV crime series (1976–1978)

- Genre: Drama
- Written by: Philip Martin
- Directed by: Alastair Reid; Roger Tucker; Kenneth Ives
- Composer: Dave Greenslade
- Country of origin: United Kingdom
- Original language: English
- No. of series: 2
- No. of episodes: 13 (including Play for Today)

Production
- Producer: David Rose
- Production locations: Birmingham, West Midlands, England, United Kingdom
- Editor: Oliver White
- Running time: 110 min. (Play for Today); 50 min. (Series 1–2)
- Production company: Pebble Mill Studios

Original release
- Network: BBC1
- Release: 9 September 1976 – 10 February 1978

Gangsters is a British television programme made by BBC television drama and shown in two series from 1976 to 1978. It was created by Philip Martin and starred Maurice Colbourne as John Kline, a former SAS officer recruited by law enforcement to become an undercover agent in Birmingham.

== Production ==
Produced at the BBC's Pebble Mill Studios in Birmingham by David Rose, Gangsters began its television life as an edition of Play for Today in 1975, followed by two series transmitted in 1976 and 1978. The series, set in the multi-cultural criminal community of Birmingham, has remained a cult favourite, memorable for its strong violence, multi-ethnic cast (and realistic – and now rather shocking – depiction of the racism of the time) and highly stylised, post-modern approach to storytelling.

The two series had quite different tones. Series 1 was serious, intense, dark, gritty and violent, whilst Series 2 was much more surreal, odd and bizarre, with more emphasis on the post-modern elements. The Series 2 approach wasn't well received at the time.

The website notaslgiacentral.com said of Gangsters that it ".. featured references to film noir, gangster films, westerns, Bollywood and kung fu movies, as well as increasingly surreal end-of-episode cliffhangers and a bizarre final scene where the characters not only "break the fourth wall" but walk off the set."

== Cast ==
- John Kline (Maurice Colbourne) – a tough, shady former SAS soldier who was released from prison after serving 3 years of his 4-year sentence for the manslaughter of the brother of the gangland boss Rawlinson. After his release, Kline has to fight attempts on his life and soon becomes re-embroiled in the intrigues of the local underworld while attempting to go straight.
- Zaheer Mohammed Khan (Ahmed Khalil) – a police detective who uses Kline as a pawn in his bid to nail the organised crime syndicates of Birmingham.
- Anne Darracott (Elizabeth Cassidy) – a young woman and former heroin addict who becomes Kline's live-in lover.
- Aslam Rafiq (Saeed Jaffrey) – the charismatic boss of a racket trafficking illegal immigrants.
- Dinah Carmichael (Tania Rogers) – a former prostitute-turned-stripper working at The Maverick. Is Kline's first love interest.
- Sarah Gant (Alibe Parsons) – a glamorous undercover CIA agent who is out to nail those running the drugs trade in the city, with a private mission to avenge the murder of her sister Dinah Carmichael.
- Kuldip (Paul Satvendar) – Rafiq's murderous henchman.
- Malleson (Paul Barber) – a former thug who takes over his boss Rawlinson's criminal underworld empire after Rawlinson is killed. Malleson proves to be a formidable adversary of Kline and Khan.
- Dermot McAvoy (Paul Antrim) – Kline's treacherous Irish business partner, who is connected with the IRA.
- Shen Tang (Robert Lee) – the leader of a local Chinese triad gang.
- Lily Li Tang (Chai Lee) – the daughter of Shen Tang, who assists her father in the running of the triad.
- Rolf Day (Rolf Day) – The racist night club comedian who performs in the Rum Runner night club.
- Philip Martin, the series' writer, also appeared in multiple roles, playing the gangland boss Rawlinson in the original Play for Today, and the hired assassin "The White Devil" in the last two episodes of Series 2. As "The White Devil", Martin was credited as Larson E. Whipsnide, a reference to his W. C. Fields-inspired performance as the character. In episodes 1 and 3 of Series 2, Martin also played himself, dictating the script to a typist, in cutaways. An irony is John Kline killing Rawlinson in the Play for Today, and Martin later returned as "The White Devil" to kill Kline in the Series 2 finale.

== Episodes ==
All episodes written by Philip Martin.

Series Overview

Series	Episodes	First Aired	Last Aired
Play for Today	1	9 January 1975	2 September 1976 (repeat)
1	6	9 September 1976	21 October 1976
2	6	6 January 1978	10 February 1978

Play for Today (1975)

- Gangsters – broadcast on 9 January 1975, repeated on 2 September 1976

Series One (1976)

- Incident 1 – broadcast on 9 September 1976
- Incident 2 – broadcast on 16 September 1976
- Incident 3 – broadcast on 23 September 1976
- Incident 4 – broadcast on 30 September 1976
- Incident 5 – broadcast on 14 October 1976
- Incident 6 – broadcast on 21 October 1976

Series Two (1978)

- The Dictates of Shen Tang – broadcast on 6 January 1978
- The Red Executioner – broadcast on 13 January 1978
- While Beauty Sleeps – broadcast on 20 January 1978
- Double Peril – broadcast on 27 January 1978
- Enter the White Devil – broadcast on 3 February 1978
- East of the Equator – broadcast on 10 February 1978

== Music ==
The theme music was an instrumental composed and performed by Dave Greenslade. It was released as a single with a character theme from the series, "Rubber Face, Lonely Eyes", on the B-side; the single was credited to Dave Greenslade's band Greenslade, even though the only performers on both tracks are Dave Greenslade and a session drummer. Greenslade recorded their own version of the song for their album Time and Tide. At David Rose's request, for Series 2 Dave Greenslade adapted it into a version with lyrics sung by Chris Farlowe.

== DVD release ==
The complete series of Gangsters was released on DVD (Region 2, UK) through 2 Entertain/Cinema Club in April 2006. According to Philip Martin, the box set became a collector's item after the company went bust. The series has to date not been re-issued and goes for high prices. As of 2026, the series has not been repeated and is not available for streaming anywhere.

== Novelisations ==
Philip Martin novelised the series several times:

- Gangsters: No 1 (1977) - covers the original Play for Today.
- Gangsters: No 2 (1978) - covers the first series
- Philip Martin's Gangsters: A Lust for Life (2017) - covers the Play for Today and the first series
- Philip Martin's Gangsters: Deathtouch (2021) - published posthumously, it covers the second series.
