= Kim Clifford =

British actress (1961–2019)

- Born: 27 January 1961
- Died: 2019 (aged 57–58); Kent, England, UK
- Occupation: Actress
- Spouse: Lee Galpin
- Children: 2

Kim Clifford (27 January 1961 – 2019) was a British actress.

Clifford was born on 27 January 1961. At the age of 13, she starred in the BAFTA TV Award winning television play Bar Mitzvah Boy.

She is possibly best known for her role as Sandra Hallam, wife of Sub Officer John Hallam, in London's Burning, whom she played from 1986 to 1997. She also made appearances in other television dramas, including Juliet Bravo, Not the Nine O'Clock News, Alas Smith and Jones and the sitcom Goodnight Sweetheart. She has also made an appearance in Only Fools and Horses in the 1985 episode "To Hull & Back" as Vicky, the barmaid at The Nag's Head.

Clifford was married to artist Lee Galpin, who was previously a fireman. They had a daughter, Michelle, and a son, Jack. She died in Medway, Kent in 2019, at the age of 58.

== Filmography ==
Year	Title	Role	Notes
1974	Where's Johnny?	Becky	
1981	Chariots of Fire	Sybil's Maid	
1982	Save the Lady	Gina	
1984	The Chain	Dingy	
