= Consuming Passions =

- Directed by: Giles Foster
- Written by: Paul D. Zimmerman; Andrew Davies
- Based on: Secrets by Michael Palin; Terry Jones
- Produced by: William P. Cartlidge
- Starring: Vanessa Redgrave; Jonathan Pryce; Tyler Butterworth; Freddie Jones; Prunella Scales; Sammi Davis; Thora Hird
- Cinematography: Roger Pratt
- Edited by: John Grover
- Music by: Richard Hartley
- Distributed by: Vestron Pictures
- Release date: 1988
- Running time: 98 min
- Country: United Kingdom
- Language: English

Consuming Passions is a 1988 black comedy film which stars Vanessa Redgrave, Jonathan Pryce, and Sammi Davis and was directed by Giles Foster. The film is based on Secrets by Michael Palin and Terry Jones, a BBC television play broadcast in 1973.

In the film, a chocolate factory accidentally released a new luxury product which contained human flesh. When the product turns into a surprise sales hit, the factory's owners decide to market their products to cannibals and to keep acquiring human corpses as key ingredients.

== Synopsis ==
The film tells the story of a chocolate factory preparing to launch a new luxury range, Passionelles. However, during the production run a worker falls into a vat of chocolate and dies, meaning human flesh is present in the first batch released.

The horrified owners try and fail to recall the chocolates, but when they go on sale, they prove a surprise hit. Keen to continue the success, the developers try to replicate the taste with animal meat, but this fails miserably - leading them to realise human flesh is the key ingredient, and going to extreme lengths to obtain dead bodies to use in the chocolate.

== Cast ==
- Tyler Butterworth as Ian Littleton
- Jonathan Pryce as Mr Farris
- Freddie Jones as Graham Chumley
- Vanessa Redgrave as Mrs Garza
- Prunella Scales as Ethel
- Sammi Davis as Felicity
- Thora Hird as Mrs Gordon
- John Wells as Dr Forrester
- Timothy West as Dr Rees
- Bryan Pringle as Gateman
- Mary Healey as Mrs Eggleston
- Andrew Sachs as Jason
- Deddie Davies as Mrs Coot
- William Rushton as Big Teddy
- Wincey Willis as TV Presenter
- Linda Lusardi as French Beauty
- Patrick Newell as Lester
- Preston Lockwood as Josiah

== Critical reception ==
In his review of the film in The New York Times, critic Vincent Canby asked "How could such a promisingly funny idea, and so many talented, intelligent people, have combined to make a film so breathlessly lame?", that "the misuse of Miss Redgrave defines just about everything that's wrong with [the film]," and "only Mr. Pryce [...] gives a consistently comic performance." Writing in The Washington Post, Desson Howe noted that the film "is kept bubbling by Foster's fast pace, and hysterically oddball performances by Vanessa Redgrave, Jonathan Pryce and Sammi Davis." Critic Michael Wilmington wrote in the Los Angeles Times that that film was "erratic but sometimes hilarious," that "to make a story like this work, you need to play it unafraid and full throttle, and [the film], unfortunately, has been pushed only to half," but that "there’s a refreshingly moral notion behind [the film]: an attack on the inhumanity of some modern corporate decisions."

The Time Out Film Guide describes the 'recipe' for this film and concludes that of the result: "the consistency should be lumpy and the taste insipid."
