= Evelyn (play) =

- Genre: Radio drama
- Running time: 45 minutes
- Country of origin: United Kingdom
- Home station: BBC Radio 4
- Starring: Ian Richardson; Pauline Collins; Geoffrey Collins
- Written by: Rhys Adrian
- Produced by: John Tydeman

Evelyn is a radio play by Rhys Adrian, first broadcast on BBC Radio 4 on 21 October 1969. It was later adapted for television as part of BBC1's Play for Today series which was transmitted on 28 October 1971.

== Synopsis ==
The play is largely a two-hander comprising a series of vignettes featuring pillow talk between the characters referred to in the script simply as 'The Man' and 'The Girl'. He is a city professional in his mid-thirties, she is a middle class housewife in her early twenties; both are enjoying an extra-marital affair, meeting every Tuesday afternoon to have sex while The Girl's husband works late at the office.

During one of their liaisons, The Girl claims to love both The Man and her husband equally. Troubled by this revelation, he gently persuades her to leave her husband and commit to him. The Girl does not consider this practical, and reveals that, besides her husband, The Man is not the only lover in her life. The Man grows increasingly paranoid that he will soon be replaced in The Girl's affections.

In an attempt to keep their love for each other alive, he invents a mistress called Evelyn who he intends to leave, along with his wife, so that he can be with The Girl – believing that this will finally persuade her to abandon her other lovers for him. Their meetings soon become more infrequent as The Girl begins to spend more time with her new lover, Peter. Despite the growing distance between them, The Girl reassures The Man that she still loves him. The play ends with a telephone conversation between the two, The Man suggesting times and places for them to meet, only for The Girl to inform him that she is unavailable. As she is about to hang up she tells The Man once more that she loves him, replaces the receiver and sighs wearily.

Evelyn was first broadcast on BBC Radio 4 on 1969. It was awarded the RAI Prize for Literary and Dramatic Programmes at the Prix Italia in 1970.

=== Radio cast ===
- Ian Richardson as The Man
- Pauline Collins as The Girl
- Geoffrey Collins as Peter

== Sources ==
- Best Radio Plays of 1982 (Methuen; 1983)
- John Drakakis (Ed.), British Radio Drama (Cambridge University Press; 1981)
