= Rhys Adrian =

British playwright and screenwriter (1928–1990)

- Born: Rhys Adrian Griffiths; 28 February 1928; London, England
- Died: 8 February 1990 (aged 61); London, England
- Occupations: Playwright, screenwriter
- Writing career
- Pen name: J. MacReady
- Genre: Drama
- Notable works: Evelyn (1969); Watching the Plays Together (1982); Outpatient (1985)
- Notable awards: Prix Italia; Giles Cooper Award

Rhys Adrian Griffiths (28 February 1928 – 8 February 1990) was a British playwright and screenwriter. He is best known for his radio plays, which are characterised by their emphasis upon dialogue rather than narrative.

== Radio dramatist ==
Rhys Adrian worked in stage management before becoming a writer, contributing material to summer shows, revues, pantomimes and West End musicals. His first radio play, The Man on the Gate, was broadcast by the BBC Home Service in November 1956. By the early 1960s he was beginning to develop the dramatic style that would become a hallmark of his subsequent work. A Nice Clean Sheet of Paper (1964) features a talkative and condescending job interviewer (played by Donald Wolfit) whose attempts to communicate with an unresponsive applicant (John Wood) drive him to incoherent blathering. The play was published by the BBC in a collection of exemplary radio plays that also included works by Colin Finbow, Joe Orton, Simon Raven and Stephen Grenfell.

Evelyn (1969), which starred Ian Richardson and Pauline Collins as a couple trapped in an extra-marital and over-crowded affair, won the RAI Prize for Literary and Dramatic Programmes at the Prix Italia and was later adapted for television. Buffet (1976) saw Richard Briers playing a borderline alcoholic city gent unwinding at a railway buffet at the end of a long and exhausting day. In an introduction to the broadcast, John Tydeman, then head of Radio 4 drama, and the producer of 27 of Adrian's plays, paid tribute to the author – referring to him as "one of the great unknown British playwrights [...] very much a language man rather than a man who used whizzy, 'show-offy' radio."

1982's Watching the Plays Together was one of Adrian's most experimental works. Consisting largely of a conversation between a middle-aged married couple troubled by the trend towards social realism in television drama, the play won the Giles Cooper Award for outstanding writing for radio. As a mark of his status as a playwright, Adrian's plays throughout the 1980s boasted casts made up of distinguished actors – including, among others, John Gielgud (Passing Time; 1983), Michael Aldridge (Outpatient; 1985) and Peter Vaughn (Toytown; 1987). His last radio play, Upended, was broadcast in 1988.

== Screenwriter ==
In addition to his work on radio, Adrian wrote a number of television plays. Big Time (1961), his first piece for television, was co-written with Julian Pepper under the pseudonym "J. MacReady". 1963's Too Old for Donkeys was an adaptation of Adrian's own radio play broadcast earlier that year. He reworked several of his radio scripts for television, often to varying levels of success. His adaptation of Evelyn for the BBC's Play for Today strand was deemed "unsatisfying" by critic David Wade, who felt that Adrian's stylised dialogue clashed with the physicality of the piece, leaving the play at a disadvantage. Buffet also suffered upon its transition to television. Adrian, however, wrote a number of original works for the medium, often as part of anthology series such as The Wednesday Play, Theatre 625, Armchair Theatre, ITV Playhouse and the aforementioned Play for Today; his 1971 play The Foxtrot marked an early departure from the latter series' emphasis on socially aware, issue-based drama towards broad comedy and non-naturalism. In 1973, his play The Withered Arm was transmitted, alongside contributions from Dennis Potter and David Mercer, as part of the Wessex Tales series for BBC2, a group of plays based on the short stories of Thomas Hardy.

== Style and themes ==
Adrian's plays are driven by character and dialogue rather than narrative; they are conversation pieces, usually between two characters, which feature highly stylised language used to a jarring, sometimes surreal, effect. In No Charge for the Extra Service (1979), the bereaved central characters, Elizabeth Spriggs and Nigel Stock, brought together by a dating agency, converse in a formal, almost artificial manner that belies the uncomfortable and disturbing truths they reveal about themselves throughout the course of the play. This emphasis on dialogue leaves Adrian's characters constantly seeking a connection with each other, bolstered by the desire to be understood. "The Man" in Evelyn desperately wants his declarations of love towards his mistress to be acknowledged, while Hugh Burden's disturbed mental patient in 1981's Passing Through attempts to piece together his broken past by engaging lonely signalman Patrick (Harry Towb) in meandering conversation. Similarly, the two down-and-outs in The Clerks (1978), Freddie Jones and Hugh Burden, seek to reclaim their lost past as intelligence agents by scrupulously poring over the events that led to them being homeless and derelict. While highly articulate, both men challenge the other's story, almost as if attempting to expose lies and half-truths. By the end of the play, perhaps owing to their alcohol consumption throughout the piece, their testimonies have become so outrageous as to be nothing but fabrication.

Adrian frequently raises the question of his characters' reliability as "narrators", their recollections viewed only through the prism of personal experience. The two nonagenarians in Passing Time (John Gielgud and Raymond Huntley) constantly back-pedal when recalling their dim and distant pasts, one memory bumping into the next, often cancelling out the previous remembrance. This is also explored in Watching the Plays Together, which examines the relationship between audience and playwright by creating an imaginary dialogue between the two, balancing the fine line between fiction and reality and providing the listener with an active role in the drama instead of a passive one.

== Partial list of works ==
=== Radio plays ===
- The Man on the Gate (1956)
- The Passionate Thinker (1957)
- The Prizewinner (1960)
- Betsie (1960)
- The Bridge (1961)
- Too Old fot Donkeys (1963)
- Room to Let (1963)
- A Nice Clean Sheet of Paper (1964)
- Helen and Edward and Henry (1966)
- Between the Two of Us (1967)
- Ella (1968)
- Echoes (1969)
- Evelyn (1969)
- The Gardeners of My Youth (1970)
- I'll Love You Always (1970)
- A Chance Encounter (1972)
- Memoirs of a Sly Pornographer (1972)
- Angle (1975)
- Buffet (1976)
- The Night Nurse Slept in the Dayroom (1976)
- The Clerks (1978)
- No Charge for the Extra Service (1979)
- Passing Through (1981)
- Watching the Plays Together (1982)
- Passing Time (1983)
- Outpatient (1985)
- Toytown (1987)
- Upended (1988)

=== Television plays ===
- Big Time (as 'J. MacReady', with Julian Pepper; 1961)
- No Licence for Singing (Armchair Theatre; 1961)
- Too Old for Donkeys (ITV Playhouse; 1963)
- I Can Walk Where I Like, Can't I? (ITV Play of the Week; 1964)
- Between the Two of Us (ITV Play of the Week; 1965)
- Ella (Thirty-Minute Theatre; 1966)
- Stan's Day Out (Theatre 625; 1967)
- The Drummer and the Bloke (The Wednesday Play; 1968)
- Henry the Incredible Bore (For Amusement Only; 1968)
- Evelyn (Play for Today; 1971)
- The Foxtrot (Play for Today; 1971)
- Thrills Galore (Thirty-Minute Theatre; 1972)
- The Withered Arm (Wessex Tales; 1973)
- The Joke (BBC2 Playhouse; 1974)
- The Cafeteria (BBC2 Playhouse; 1974)
- Buffet (Play for Today; 1976)
- Mr and Ms Bureaucrat (Play of the Week; 1978)
- Getting in on Concorde (ITV Playhouse; 1979)
- Passing Through (BBC2 Playhouse; 1982)

== Awards ==
- 1969: Prix Italia
- 1982: Giles Cooper Award

== Legacy ==
Of Rhys Adrian's 32 radio plays, only 13 exist in the BBC archive. The surviving pieces were largely sourced from off-air recordings. Many of his television plays also no longer exist. In February 2010, BBC Radio 7 broadcast several of Adrian's plays to mark the 20th anniversary of his death. The plays were Evelyn, Buffet, No Charge for the Extra Service, The Clerks, Passing Through and Passing Time.

== Sources ==
- Best Radio Plays of 1982 (Methuen; 1983)
- John Drakakis (ed.), British Radio Drama (Cambridge University Press; 1981)
- John Russell Taylor, Anger and After (Penguin; 1963)
