= David Rose (producer) =

British television producer (1924–2017)

- Born: 22 November 1924; Swanage, Dorset, England
- Died: 26 January 2017 (aged 92)
- Occupations: TV and film producer

David Edward Rose (22 November 1924 – 26 January 2017) was a British television producer and commissioning editor.

== At the BBC ==
Following war service flying on 34 missions in Lancaster bombers, he trained as an actor at the Guildhall School of Drama, but following graduation pursued a career in stage management. He became an Assistant Floor Manager for BBC television in London in 1954, but by the end of the 1950s he was a director of dramatised documentaries for the BBC, including Black Furrow (1958) about open cast mining in South Wales.

It is as a producer and production executive though, that he had the greatest prominence. Rose was the original producer of Z-Cars (1962–65). Broadcast live at Rose's insistence thinking the excitement generated by avoiding pre-recording was integral to the production. Rose was responsible for ending its original run thinking the format had become exhausted. Softly, Softly (1966–69) was a spin-off series also produced by Rose.

Appointed by David Attenborough in 1971 to be head of the newly established autonomous English Regional Drama department at BBC Pebble Mill in Birmingham, Rose produced work by established dramatists like Alan Plater and encouraged new creative talent such as Alan Bleasdale, David Rudkin, and David Hare. Some of Rose's work in Birmingham appeared in the Play for Today or Second City Firsts anthology series.

Notable plays he presided over include Alan Clarke's Penda's Fen (1974), Gangsters (1976) and Hare's Licking Hitler (1978).

== Film on Four ==
Despite being near retirement, in April 1981, Rose left the BBC for Channel 4 where he was appointed the Commissioning Editor for Fiction by Jeremy Isaacs, the channel's founding Chief Executive. Issacs wrote in 2017, that Rose's first suggestion to him was to commission a soap from Phil Redmond, the result Brookside ran for 21 years until ending in 2003. However, Rose was mostly identified with the Film on Four strand. With an initial overall budget of £6million a year, Rose invested £300,000 in twenty films annually. Originally, the project's films were intended for television screenings alone; the "holdback" system prevented investment in theatrical films by television companies because of the length of time (then three years) before broadcasters could screen them. An agreement soon concluded with the Cinema Exhibitors Association though, allowed a brief period of cinema exhibition if the budget of the films was below £1.25 million.

During his time at Channel 4, Rose approved the making of 136 films, half of which received cinema screenings, investing in a third of the feature films made in the UK during 1984. By 1987, Channel 4 had an interest in half the films being made in the United Kingdom. Rose remained in his post as Commissioning Editor until March 1990. Rose is credited by many as being a significant figure in the regeneration of British cinema and particularly remembered for films such as My Beautiful Laundrette, Wish You Were Here, Dance With a Stranger, Mona Lisa, and Letter to Brezhnev. Mike Leigh told writer Hannah Rothschild around 2008 that Film on Four had saved the British film industry: "This is a non-negotiable, historical fact of life and anybody who suggests that this isn’t the case is simply either suffering from some kind of ignorance or has got some terrible chip." Of the 150 films Rose backed, 20 were from overseas sources, including work by directors Theo Angelopoulos, Andrei Tarkovsky and Wim Wenders.

David Rose was awarded a special prize for services to the cinema at Cannes in 1987. This was followed by the gold medal of the Royal Television Society in 1988 and, in April 2010, the BFI Fellowship, whose other recipients include Martin Scorsese and Orson Welles.
