= Mark Shivas =

British television executive (1938–2008)

Mark Shivas (24 April 1938 – 11 October 2008) was a British television producer, film producer and executive.

== Early life ==
Shivas was born in Banstead in Surrey. His father was an English teacher; his mother was a librarian. He attended Whitgift School in Croydon and read law at Merton College, Oxford. Shivas wrote for the student magazine Oxford Opinions.

== Career ==
After abandoning a legal career, he co-founded the magazine Movie (1961–64), which used the French publication Cahiers du Cinéma as its model. He was assistant editor (1962–64), and also contributed interviews and articles to The New York Times.

Shivas began his television career at Granada Television in 1964 as an assistant to the head of the story department, and later worked on the company's Cinema series as a producer and presenter. In 1969, he joined the BBC's drama department, and became one of the corporation's most successful and prolific producers. The costume drama The Six Wives of Henry VIII (1970) was nominated for three Emmy Awards in 1972. Dennis Potter's Casanova (1971) was another success.

Other productions he oversaw included the anthology series Black and Blue (1973), which included the play Secrets by Michael Palin and Terry Jones. In 1979 he left the BBC to make two films at ITV company Southern Pictures: Richard's Things (1980) and Bad Blood (1981). Critics disliked Shivas's production of The Borgias (1981) for the BBC; it suffered in comparison with the contemporary Brideshead Revisited on ITV.

Shivas was head of drama at the BBC from 1988 to 1993; he then moved to run BBC Films, which he had founded in 1990 as part of the Drama Department, and was executive producer of twenty films. In later years, he returned to producing as a freelancer. Some of his most noted later productions included the second series of Alan Bennett's Talking Heads monologues in 1998 and the 2003 espionage drama Cambridge Spies.

== Death ==
Shivas died from skin cancer (Melanoma) on 11 October 2008, aged 70.

Media offices
| Preceded by Jonathan Powell | BBC Television Head of Drama; 1988–1993 | Succeeded by Charles Denton |
