= Rex Rashley =

British actor (1894–1972)

Rex Rashley (1894–1972) was a British character actor who appeared regularly on The Morecambe & Wise Show (1968) often dressed in familiar stars' attire as part of a joke. For instance, he appeared in cowboy hat, spurs and sheriff's star on stage, with Morecambe advising Wise that he was "John Wayne's Son" - the joke being that Rashley was elderly and clearly several years older than Wayne himself.

== Filmography ==
Year	Title	Role	Notes
1957	The Key Man	Custodian	Uncredited
1971	A Clockwork Orange	Biblio Oldie / Drunk Tramp	Uncredited, (final film role)
