= Graeme MacDonald =

British television producer and executive

- Born: Graeme Patrick David MacDonald; 30 July 1930
- Died: 30 September 1997 (aged 67)
- Other names: Graeme McDonald; Graham McDonald
- Employer(s): Granada Television; BBC
- Title: BBC Television Head of Drama (1981-1985); Controller of BBC2 (1982-1987)

Graeme Patrick David MacDonald OBE (30 July 1930 – 30 September 1997), sometimes credited as Graeme McDonald or Graham McDonald, was a British television producer and executive.

== Early life ==
MacDonald was educated at St Paul's School, London and Jesus College, Cambridge, where he initially studied geology and physics, but changed to an arts degree. While at Cambridge he was vice-president of the Footlights and president of the University Players, but left without a degree.

== Career ==
MacDonald began his career in 1960 as a trainee director at Granada Television. In 1966 he joined the BBC, becoming a producer in the drama department, working particularly on anthology play series such as The Wednesday Play (for which he produced some of Dennis Potter's early work), Thirty-Minute Theatre, and Theatre 625. In the 1970s he became the producer of the single play strand Play for Today, the successor to The Wednesday Play, during which he worked on many acclaimed pieces, such as Jack Rosenthal's Bar Mitzvah Boy (1976).

By this time one of the senior producers working in the BBC's drama department, in 1977 he was promoted to become the Head of Serials. This department was merged with the Series department in 1979, and MacDonald became head of the new larger Series & Serials department which ensued. In 1981, he was promoted again to succeed Shaun Sutton as the overall Head of Drama at BBC Television.

MacDonald became the Controller of BBC2 in 1983, the first ever BBC channel controller to come from a background in the drama department. He was controller of the channel until 1987 (combining it with his Head of Drama role until he left this post in 1985), during which the Zircon affair erupted surrounding an edition of the Secret Society documentary series due to be shown on the channel.

MacDonald left the BBC in 1987 and became chief executive of Anglia Films (1988–94), where he produced the television film Goldeneye (1989) about Ian Fleming, and later Ardent Productions (1994–97).

Media offices
Preceded by Shaun Sutton	BBC Television Head of Drama; 1981-1985	Succeeded by Jonathan Powell
Preceded by Brian Wenham	Controller of BBC2; 1982-1987	Succeeded by Alan Yentob
