= Michael Tuchner =

British film and theatre director (1932–2017)

- Born: Michael John Tuchner; 24 June 1932; Berlin
- Died: 17 February 2017 (aged 84)
- Education: University College London
- Occupations: film and theatre director

Michael John Tuchner (24 June 1932 – 17 February 2017) was a British film and theatre director.

Born in Berlin, to German-Jewish parents, he was seven years old when his family moved to Britain with the rise of the Nazis. He eventually read classics at University College London, where he was president of the film society, and subsequently joined the BBC as a trainee editor on the Tonight programme. After work on documentaries and commercials, he made his debut as a TV director with The Wednesday Play in 1969.

Feature films followed, and Tuchner's credits included Villain (1971), Fear is the Key (1972), Mister Quilp (1975) and the film version of The Likely Lads (1976). Many of these were for EMI Films.

He then made The Hunchback of Notre Dame (1982), the Disney film Trenchcoat (1983), Wilt (1989) and Back to the Secret Garden (2001). Nominated for a BAFTA TV Award four times, he won for the 1975 television play Bar Mitzvah Boy.

He died on 17 February 2017 at the age of 84.
