= Jeremy Seabrook =

English author and journalist (1939–2024)

Jeremy Richard Seabrook (14 November 1939 – 30 November 2024) was an English author and journalist who specialised in social, environmental and development issues. His book The Refuge and the Fortress: Britain and the Flight from Tyranny was longlisted for the Orwell Prize.

== Early life and career ==
Seabrook was born in Northampton on 14 November 1939. He was educated at Northampton Grammar School and Gonville and Caius College, Cambridge, graduating with a degree in Modern and Medieval Languages in 1960. He worked as a teacher and as a social worker, and began writing for the journal New Society in 1963. In addition to contributing articles to newspapers and magazines, Seabrook has also written numerous books and plays for television, radio and theatre, including several collaborations with his old schoolfriend Michael O'Neill. Seabrook died at a care home in London, on 30 November 2024, at the age of 85.

== Written works (partial list) ==
- The Unprivileged (1973)
- City Close-Up (1974)
- A Lasting Relationship (1976)
- What went wrong?: Working People and the Ideals of the Labour Movement (1977) (published in the United States as What went wrong?: Why Hasn’t Having More Made People Happier?)
- Mother and Son (1980)
- Working Class Childhood (1982)
- Unemployment in the Eighties (1983)
- Idea of Neighbourhood, The (1984)
- Landscapes of Poverty (1985)
- Life and Labour in a Bombay Slum (1987)
- The Race for Riches: Human Cost of Wealth (1988)
- The Myth of the Market: Promises and Illusions (1990)
- Victims of Development: Resistance and Alternatives (1993)
- Notes From Another India (1995)
- In the Cities of the South (1996)
- Travels in the Skin Trade (1996)
- Colonies of the Heart (1997)
- Love in a Different Climate: Men who have Sex with Men in India (1999)
- Children of Other Worlds: Exploitation in the Global Market (2001)
- Freedom Unfinished: Fundamentalism and Popular Resistance in Bangladesh Today (2001)
- A World Growing Old (2003)
- Consuming Cultures: Globalization and Local Lives (2004)
- The No-nonsense Guide to Class, Caste and Hierarchy (2005)
- The No-nonsense Guide to World Poverty (2007)
- People Without History: India's Muslim Ghettos (2007)
- The Refuge and the Fortress: Britain and the Flight From Tyranny (2008)
- The Song of the Shirt: Cheap Clothes Across Continents and Centuries (2014)
- Private Worlds: Growing Up Gay in Post-War Britain (2023)

=== Turkish translations ===
- Başka Dünyaların Çocukları: Küresel Piyasada Sömürü, çev: Onur Gayretli, Fol Kitap, 2021.

=== Posthumous works ===
- Boy Bitten by a Lizard (2026)
- Concealment (2026)
