= Eleven Years and One Day =

1963 film

- Directed by: Gottfried Reinhardt
- Written by: Jan Lustig; Gottfried Reinhardt
- Based on: A Way Through the Wood by Nigel Balchin
- Produced by: Roland Beyer; Luggi Waldleitner
- Starring: Ruth Leuwerik; Bernhard Wicki; Paul Hubschmid
- Cinematography: Klaus von Rautenfeld
- Edited by: Elisabeth Kleinert-Neumann
- Music by: Hans-Martin Majewski
- Production company: Roxy Film
- Distributed by: Nora-Filmverleih
- Release date: 6 September 1963
- Running time: 100 minutes
- Country: West Germany
- Language: German

Eleven Years and One Day (German: Elf Jahre und ein Tag) is a 1963 West German drama film directed by Gottfried Reinhardt and starring Ruth Leuwerik, Bernhard Wicki and Paul Hubschmid.

It was shot at the Bavaria Studios in Munich and on location in Salzburg.

== Cast ==
- Ruth Leuwerik as Tina Rodenbach
- Bernhard Wicki as Karl Rodenbach
- Paul Hubschmid as Tony Cameron
- Margot Trooger as Fanni Gruber
- Wolfgang Dörich as Pichler
- Heinrich Schweiger as Stumpf
- Georg Corten as Wotawa
- Karl Tischlinger

== See also ==
- Separate Lies (2005), also based on Nigel Balchin's 1951 novel A Way Through the Wood
