= Balchin =

Balchin is a surname. Notable people with the surname include:

- Cassandra Balchin (1962–2012), British women's rights activist, daughter of Nigel
- Elliot Balchin (born 1990), British actor
- John Balchen (1670–1744), sometimes spelled Balchin, Royal Navy Admiral of the White
- Nigel Balchin (1908–1970), British novelist and screenwriter, father of Cassandra
- Robert Balchin, Baron Lingfield (born 1942), British educationalist
