= Glemsford =

Village in Suffolk, England

Coordinates: 52.100°N 0.669°E

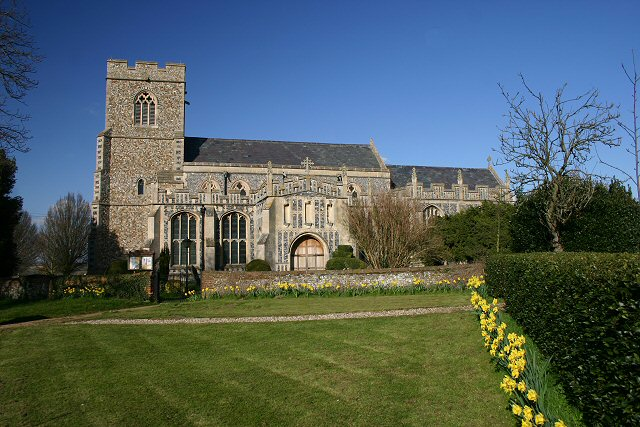
- Parish Church of St Mary

- Location within Suffolk
- Population: 3,693 (2021)
- OS grid reference: TL833482
- Civil parish: Glemsford
- District: Babergh
- Shire county: Suffolk
- Region: East
- Country: England
- Sovereign state: United Kingdom
- Post town: SUDBURY
- Postcode district: CO10
- Dialling code: 01787
- Police: Suffolk
- Fire: Suffolk
- Ambulance: East of England
- UK Parliament: South Suffolk

Glemsford is a village and civil parish in the Babergh district in Suffolk, England, near the town of Sudbury. Glemsford is located near the River Glem and the River Stour also flows nearby. Glemsford is surrounded by arable farmland and is not far from historic Suffolk villages such as Lavenham and Long Melford. In 2021 it had a population of 3693.

== History ==
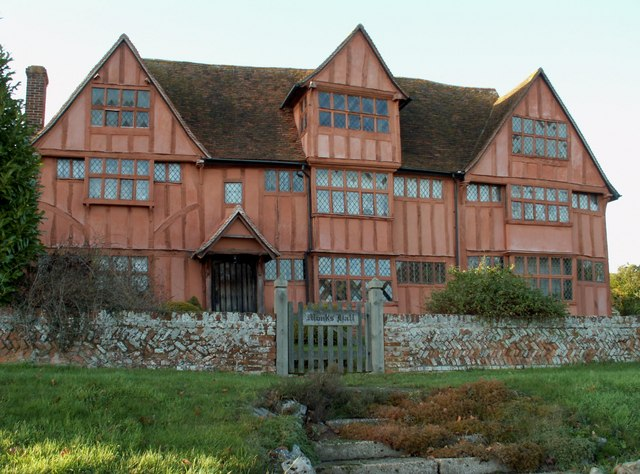
Monks Hall

The village is first recorded before the Norman Conquest in the S1051 charter of Edward the Confessor granting lands to Ely Abbey. The Domesday Book of 1086 records the population of Glemsford in 1086 to be 40 households made up of 16 villagers, 1 freeman, 18 smallholders, and 5 slaves along with 8 cattle, 32 pigs, 200 sheep, 3 other animals, 12 acres of meadow, 5 woodland pigs, a mill and a church.

The village has noteworthy features such as Monks Hall, which is a medieval timber structure. It is said that a tunnel once connected Monks Hall to the nearby Parish Church of St Mary the Virgin, which the monks formerly used to access the church instead of mixing with the ordinary villagers. Only a small part of this tunnel remains. The Parish Church of St Mary the Virgin dates back to the early 14th century, with the earliest recorded rector being Hugh de Poynton in 1302. The church features the Golding Chapel, built in memory of the rich Glemsford cloth merchant, John Golding. Golding lived in the Angel House, another timber building adjacent to The Angel public house, which serves traditional real ales. Golding left money for the chapel to be built when he died, likewise as with other parish churches St Mary's Church tower was rebuilt in the 19th century. Monks Hall itself has gone through changes of use and appearance through the centuries and is now a private residence. Glemsford Methodist Church is situated at the other end of the village and dates from the Victorian era.

In the early 16th century, Glemsford became the home of George Cavendish who was a local nobleman and gentleman-usher to Cardinal Thomas Wolsey. Upon Wolsey's death in 1530, Cavendish retired to Glemsford and in the mid-1550s he finalized a biography on Cardinal Wolsey which was published after his own death in 1562.

The village and the surrounding area, like much of East Anglia, was strongly Puritan during much of the 17th century. By 1640, several families had departed for the Massachusetts Bay Colony as part of the wave of emigration that occurred during the Great Migration.

Glemsford railway station was on the route between Sudbury and Cambridge, known as the Stour Valley Railway. The station opened in the 1860s and saw its busiest period during the First and Second World Wars when it, along with nearby Cavendish station, was bombed. This was because Glemsford station was one of the places which harboured ammunition trains. The station was closed during the Beeching Axe in 1967; only the Station House (now private), goods shed (now converted to flats) and one level crossing post remain.

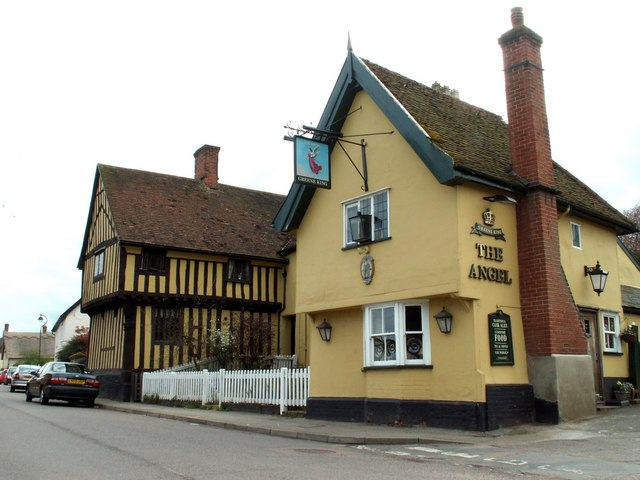
The Angel Inn, Glemsford

Glemsford is a large village by Suffolk standards; it also has a considerable number of shops and public houses.

== Governance ==
Glemsford is part of the electoral ward called Glemsford and Stanstead.

In 1894 Glemsford became part of Melford Rural District, in 1896 Glemsford became an urban district which became part of the administrative county of West Suffolk in 1889, the district contained the parish of Glemsford. On 1 April 1935 the district was abolished and merged back into Melford Rural District and as such the parish became part of Melford Rural District again. In 1974 Glemsford became part of Babergh district in the non-metropolitan county of Suffolk.

== Notable residents ==
- John Golding (1430–1497) (Cloth Merchant) bequeathed money for the building of the Golding Chapel in St Mary's Church in his will (probate dated 20 May 1497).
- George Cavendish (1497 – 1562), writer, best known as the biographer of Cardinal Thomas Wolsey.
- Edmund Boldero (1608–1679), royalist clergyman and academic, Master of Jesus College, Cambridge from 1663.
- William Falkner ( - 1682), Anglican divine and learned champion of the Church of England.
- Charles Morgan (1678-1736), clergyman and Master of Clare College from 1726 until his death.
- Frederick Cradock (1886 – 1943), boilerman posthumously awarded the George Cross for heroism in his attempts to save a workmate from boiling steam from an accident in the parish.
- Billie Whitelaw (1932 – 2014), stage and film actress.
- Jonathan Green, author and investigative journalist specialising in narrative non-fiction.
- Nigel Balchin, author and screenwriter. Lived at Greyhound House.
- Cassandra Balchin, Women's Rights Activist. Lived at Greyhound House.
