= Darkness Falls from the Air =

1942 novel by Nigel Balchin

- First edition
- Author: Nigel Balchin
- Language: English
- Genre: Drama
- Publisher: Collins
- Publication date: 1942
- Publication place: United Kingdom
- Media type: Print

Darkness Falls from the Air is a 1942 novel by the British writer Nigel Balchin. It was inspired by Balchin's time working at the Ministry of Food and was both a critical and commercial success.

== Plot ==
Bill Sarratt, the novel's narrator, is a war-time volunteer civil servant who is struggling during the London Blitz to establish efficient working practices in his department of the Ministry. A competent planner, Sarratt find himself increasingly frustrated that his every initiative is being blocked by his boss, Lennox, who is in the pocket of big business. Lennox avoids approving anything that will inconvenience his business friends.

Sarratt's wife, Marcia, is in a relationship with Stephen Ryle, an artistic poseur. While not approving, Sarratt does not feel that he has the right to constrain his wife's choices, and he takes no action, trusting that her infatuation will sooner or later burn itself out. Marcia is committed to her marriage and she attempts to finish with Stephen several times, but is unable to resist his emotional outbursts and the feelings of guilt they create in her. Unable to take any more, Sarratt gives his wife an ultimatum: either she drops Stephen immediately, or he will leave.

Sarratt has for months been working on a scheme to improve the reliability of wartime industrial output, and it appears that for once, due to the approval of the government minister, Lennox has been unable to block it. However, at the very end of the meeting set up to approve enforcement, the minister allows himself to be persuaded that the scheme should be purely voluntary, thereby undermining its entire purpose.

Sarratt leaves the meeting in despair, and resolves to resign from his post. As he waits for Marcia to join him in a West End restaurant, he learns that there is an air raid on the East End, where Marcia is working as a volunteer medical orderly. He persuades a taxi driver to take him there, and discovers that her building has been hit. Scrambling on hands and knees through the rubble, he finds his wife dying, pinned beneath a fallen beam.

Dazed, Sarratt returns home. Feeling impelled to tell Stephen of Marcia's death, he walks to Stephen's flat. The place is full of gas and he is just in time to prevent Stephen's attempted suicide. He walks on through the darkened streets of London as incendiaries fall about him.

== Principal characters ==
- Bill Sarratt, volunteer civil servant and narrator
- Marcia Sarratt, his wife
- Stephen Ryle, Marcia's lover
- Peggy Ryle, Stephen's wife
- Doris, Sarratt's secretary
- Ted Ransome, Sarratt's friend
- Lennox, Sarratt's boss
- Harness, personal business advisor to Lennox
- Fred Giles, Sarratt's junior

== Background ==
Balchin's first marriage broke up following a partner-swapping arrangement between the Balchins, the artist Michael Ayrton and the latter's partner Joan. Elisabeth Balchin also had an affair with the composer Christian Darnton. Balchin divorced Elisabeth in 1951 and she married Ayrton a year later. In the novel, Balchin includes an unflattering caricature of Darnton as the poet Stephen Ryle.

== Bibliography ==
- Clive James. At the Pillars of Hercules. Pan Macmillan, 2013.

== See also ==
- Darkness Falls from the Air at the Internet Archive
