= Thomas Baptiste =

British actor and opera singer (1929–2018)

- Born: Alastair Neil Robertson Niven; 17 March 1929; British Guiana
- Died: 6 December 2018 (aged 89)
- Occupations: Actor and opera singer

Thomas Baptiste (17 March 1929 – 6 December 2018) was a Guyanese-born British actor and opera singer.

== Biography ==
Baptiste was born in British Guiana (now Guyana) as the son of a wealthy landowner. He moved to Britain in the late 1940s. His one contact was the Labour MP Tom Driberg, who helped him gain factory employment, and Baptiste enrolled at Morley College in Lambeth to study music followed by scholarships to the National School of Opera and Royal Academy of Music. Baptiste joined Joan Littlewood's Theatre Workshop early in its existence.

Baptiste appeared in a production of Noël Coward's Nude with Violin for two years from 1956 with John Gielgud, Patience Collier and Kathleen Harrison, first in Dublin and then the West End. In 1960, he played Riley in the first professional production of Harold Pinter's The Room and in a production directed by Pinter himself who had wanted to cast Baptiste in the role. It became an episode of ITV's Television Playhouse broadcast in October 1961. In 1963, Baptiste played the first Black character to appear in Coronation Street, a bus conductor who was falsely sacked as a result of a racist altercation with Len Fairclough. Fable (1965) was an episode of The Wednesday Play written by John Hopkins which imagined Britain as a mirror apartheid society with Barbara Assoon playing his wife as she had done in Coronation Street. Alun Owen's drama Pal (Play for Today, 1971), of which no recording survives, was the first British television play to feature a black gay character. Meanwhile on stage during the 1960s, he played Doolittle in Pygmalion and George in Who's Afraid of Virginia Woolf?. Later, he played Paul Robeson, who he admired greatly, in Are You Now or Have You Ever Been? at the Birmingham Rep in 1978, a production which transferred to Mayfair.

In the 1960s, Baptiste co-founded an advisory committee of the British Actors' Equity Association, to represent black actors in Britain. In an interview which appeared in 1992, he said that he thought black actors were having even more difficulty beginning their careers than he had done forty years earlier.

From the 1990s, Baptiste had a home in St Lucia, and he spent the last 10 years of his life in Hove, East Sussex. He died, aged 89, on 6 December 2018.

== Selected credits ==
=== Stage ===
- Nude with Violin (as Obadiah Lewellyn)
- Who's Afraid of Virginia Woolf? (as George)
- Pygmalion (as Alfred Doolittle)
- Are You Now or Have You Ever Been?, 1978, Birmingham Rep (as Paul Robeson)

=== Film ===
- Sapphire (1959) - Man on the Street (uncredited)
- Beyond This Place (1959) - Haydock
- Flame in the Streets (1961) - (uncredited)
- In the Cool of the Day (1963) - Murray Logan's chauffeur (uncredited)
- Guns at Batasi (1964) - Minor Role (uncredited)
- Dr. Terror's House of Horrors (1965) - Dambala (segment "Voodoo") (uncredited)
- The Ipcress File (1965) - Barney - American Agent
- Help! (1965) - Bandsman (uncredited)
- Jemima & Johnny (1966, Short) - Jemima's Father
- The Comedians (1967) - Haitian Soldier (uncredited)
- The Seven Red Berets (1969) - African soldier (uncredited)
- Two Gentlemen Sharing (1969) - Mutt, Moving Man
- Sunday Bloody Sunday (1971) - Prof. Johns
- Divorce His, Divorce Hers (1973, TV Movie) - Minister
- Black Snake (1973) - Isiah
- Shaft in Africa (1973) - Kopo
- Ghost in the Noonday Sun (1973) - Andullah
- Honeybaby, Honeybaby (1974) - Gen. Christian Awani
- The Wild Geese (1978) - Col. Mboya
- The Class of Miss MacMichael (1978) - Visitor
- The Music Machine (1979) - Claire's Father
- The Dogs of War (1980) - Dexter
- Rise and Fall of Idi Amin (1981) - Dr. Michael Oloya
- Ama (1991) - Babs
- The Secret Laughter of Women (1999) - Papa Fola

=== Television ===
- Nightfall at Kriekville (1961) - Bantu Parson
- Coronation Street (1963) - Johnny Alexander
- Fable (The Wednesday Play, 1965) - Mark
- Till Death Us Do Part (intolerance) 1966
- The Saint (“Island of Chance”, 1967) - Grant
- Pal (1971)
- Empire Road (1978-1979) - Herbie
- Yes Minister (The Official Visit, 1980) - President Selim Mohammed (formerly Charlie Umtali before conversion to Islam)
- Legacy of Murder(1982) 6 part series with Dick Emery.
- Minder (high drains pilferer) (1984) - Mr. Mikabwe
- King (1984) - Mr. King
- ScreenPlay - Drums Along Balmoral Drive (1986) - Badinga
- EastEnders (1990)
- Love Hurts (1992) - Lord Godfrey
