= Mine Own Executioner (novel) =

1945 novel by Nigel Balchin

- First edition
- Author: Nigel Balchin
- Language: English
- Genre: Thriller
- Publisher: Collins
- Publication date: 1945
- Publication place: United Kingdom
- Media type: Print
- Pages: 256

Mine Own Executioner is a 1945 psychological thriller by the English novelist Nigel Balchin, and is the novel most often associated with the author. It was the most popular of Balchin's three war-time novels, following earlier successes he had had with Darkness Falls from the Air (1942) and The Small Back Room (1943), both of which had already acquired status as contemporary social documents.

The novel was adapted into a 1947 film and into a 1960 Australian TV play.

== Plot ==
Felix Milne is a London psycho-analyst who divides his time between private practice and a charitable clinic run by the philanthropist Dr Norris Pile, where treatment is provided free to poor patients. He is one of the lay therapists on the staff, not being a medical doctor. Milne is disillusioned with his work. Although he is able to help 12-year-old Charlie Oakes stop wetting the bed, by persuading the boy's father not to punish him for it, he is unsure how much he is really able to do for the most intractable patients.

Milne is unhappy in his home life, too. He has tired of his wife Patricia and is ready to seek sexual excitement elsewhere. The couple are on the verge of separation, but in spite of his professional expertise Milne is unable to solve his own problems. Family friends Peter and Barbara Edge come for dinner, and Peter quietly asks Milne whether he would take Barbara on as a private patient, as he thinks she may be "over sexed". Although Milne refuses to accept her as a patient, she does talk to him frankly, flirts and confesses that she is not in love with her husband. Milne attempts several times to start an affair – without success, as Barbara declines to become sexually involved.

Milne is asked to take on the case of Adam Lucian, a young ex-RAF fighter pilot. He has already made two attempts to murder his wife, Molly, and she has persuaded him to accept treatment, but as Lucian hates and fears doctors he consents only on the basis that he will never have to see one. Milne is unsure whether he will be able to help a patient with 'schizoid tendencies', but agrees to try.

Under the influence of sodium pentothal, Lucian talks of being shot down in the jungles of Burma, and of being captured by Japanese soldiers. He at last shamefacedly admits to Milne that under interrogation and threat of torture he had divulged sensitive military information to the enemy. Lucian arrives to his next appointment elated and feels himself cured, having finally got his guilty secret off his chest. Milne feels there is something still deeper in Lucian's history that needs to come out. Although Milne vaguely feels that therapy should continue there and then, he has a headache and he lets Lucian go, agreeing to continue in a few days time.

Dr Pile is offered a substantial grant to support the clinic on condition that he removes from its staff medically unqualified 'quacks'. Milne tenders his resignation.

While Milne tries again to seduce Barbara, Patricia phones to report that the police want to speak to him. Lucian has shot his wife four times, and gone on the run. After speaking to the dying Molly in hospital, Milne returns home to find Lucian there, talking to Patricia. Lucian escapes, and is later spotted on the high ledge of an office building. Milne climbs a fireman's ladder to talk his patient down, but as he reaches the top Lucian shoots himself.

The coroner at the inquest is an elderly doctor with a fearsome reputation for finding somebody to blame. He takes a dim view of unqualified therapists, and interprets Milne's candid admission of uncertainty as tantamount to an acknowledgement that he was out of his depth. Only a last-minute intervention by Dr James Garsten, one of Milne's medically-qualified colleagues at the clinic, averts a highly critical coroner's report.

Milne is angry, both with himself for having letting Lucian go, and with Garsten for using his position as a doctor to pander to the coroner's prejudices, even though he himself benefited. He tells Patricia that he is fed up with being 'sucked dry' by his patients and patronised by the medical profession. He starts to destroy his records, telling her that he wants to give up psycho-therapy and to come back to her. At that moment, Charlie Oakes arrives for an appointment. Milne recognises that he does after all have a certain talent for dealing with people's problems, and that he can help his bed-wetting patient. Patricia remarks "Well? What's wrong with that?"

== Principal characters ==
- Felix Milne, London psycho-analyst
- Patricia Milne, his wife
- Barbara (Babs) Edge, flirty friend
- Peter Edge, Barbara's husband
- Adam Lucian, Milne's patient and war veteran
- Molly Lucian, Adam's wife
- Charlie Oakes, Milne's patient, aged 12
- Dr Norris Pile, owner of clinic
- Dr James Garsten, Milne's professional colleague

== Title ==
The book's epigraph is a short quotation from Donne's Devotions in which he sets out several examples of men that have been their own executioners by committing suicide. Donne comments, "But I do nothing upon my selfe, and yet I am mine owne Executioner."

== Background ==
Balchin was a psychologist, initially as a consultant to chocolate makers J. S. Rowntree & Son. In 1941 he joined the War Office as a psychologist, going on to become deputy scientific adviser to the army council. At the end of the war he became a full-time writer. With Mine Own Executioner he consolidated the successes he had had with his wartime novels Darkness Falls from the Air (1942) and The Small Back Room (1943) that had acquired instant status as contemporary social documents.

== Critical reception ==
In 1946, Kirkus Reviews called the book "psychiatry as intelligent as it has been practised in print" but "perhaps a little too civilized for the wider public.

Writing in The New Review in 1974, the critic Clive James noted that this novel, the one most often identified with Balchin's name, was a huge success, selling 54,000 in hardback alone with a further 250,000 copies in paperback by 1953. James considered the book's overriding sense to be one of 'fatalistic resignation'. It addresses, he said, the post-war lack of purpose, with the tension coming from what is not being faced, its secret signals.

== Adaptations ==
In 1947 the novel was adapted into a film of the same name directed by Anthony Kimmins and starring Burgess Meredith, Kieron Moore and Dulcie Gray. In 1960 it was produced in Australia as a TV play, again of the same name.
