= Mine Own Executioner (TV play) =

1960 Australian television play

- 27 Jun 1960 advertisement
- Directed by: William Sterling
- Country of origin: Australia
- Original language: English

Production
- Running time: 90 mins
- Production company: ABC

Original release
- Network: ABC
- Release: 20 April 1960 (live, Melbourne)
- Release: 29 June 1960 (Sydney)

Mine Own Executioner is a 1960 Australian television play based on Nigel Balchin's 1945 novel of the same name. It was shot in Melbourne, at a time when Australian drama was rare.

== Plot ==
Psychiatrist Felix Milne (Brian James) is treating a schizophrenic ex-war pilot Adam Lucian (Edward Brayshaw). Felix and his wife Pat (June Brunell) are incompatible, but he is attracted to Barbara (Beverley Phillips), wife of Peter Edge, who are friends of the Milnes. After Adam makes two attempts to kill his wife, she begs Felix to treat her husband.

== Cast ==
- Brian James as Felix Milne
- June Brunell as Pat Milne
- Edward Brayshaw as Adam Lucian
- Beverley Phillips as Barbara
- Roland Renshaw as Peter Edge
- Marcella Burgoyne as Molly Lucian
- Wynne Roberts
- Kurt Ludescher
- Edward Howell
- Campbell Copelin
- Kendrick Hudson
- James Lynch
- Lloyd Cunnington

== Reception ==
The Australian Woman's Weekly called it "the best live TV drama yet." The Age, however, said the production was a "waste of time" and that the script was "dated".
