= Barbara Assoon =

Trinidad and Tobago actress (1929–2020)

Barbara Dolores Assoon (c. 1929 – 14 April 2020) was a Trinidad and Tobago actress, journalist, and broadcaster.

== Biography ==
Barbara Assoon was born in Port of Spain, Trinidad and Tobago. The daughter of a French-Chinese acrobat, she began her acting career in the mid-1940s. In 1948, she had a role in a production of Peter Ustinov's play The Indifferent Shepherd, acting in the first of many productions with Errol John. In the following year, Assoon received a scholarship to study acting in England, choosing the Bristol Old Vic school, and appearing as Tituba in the first performance of Arthur Miller's The Crucible there on 9 November 1954. Assoon spent the next 19 years in Britain and appeared in many radio, television and stage productions. She performed in many radio soap operas as well as live TV dramas during the 1950s. In 1957, Assoon made her Trinidadian radio debut in The Edwards Family, a soap opera.

In 1958, she played Rosa in Errol John's play Moon on a Rainbow Shawl at the Royal Court Theatre. She reprised her role in The Crucible for British television, in a production also featuring Sean Connery. She also played one of the leads in Fable (1965), an episode of The Wednesday Play by John Hopkins, an inversion of South African apartheid. Hopkins' play reunited her with Thomas Baptiste; the two actors had played the first Black couple to appear in Coronation Street in 1963.

In 1966, her English husband died; he was an accountant, the couple had a son. Assoon returned to Trinidad with her son in 1968 working with Radio Trinidad as a radio presenter especially on its programme intended for women. Her last appearance in a stage play was in 1990, in Derek Walcott's Remembrance, appearing with Norman Beaton. After her retirement, she remained active in training the next generation of journalists.

She died, aged 91, in Westshore Hospital, Cocorite, Port of Spain.

== Other television credits ==
- South (TV, 1959)
