= Lightbody on Liberty =

1936 novel by Nigel Balchin

- First edition
- Author: Nigel Balchin
- Language: English
- Genre: Comedy
- Publisher: Collins
- Publication date: 1936
- Publication place: United Kingdom
- Media type: Print

Lightbody on Liberty is a 1936 comedy novel by the British writer Nigel Balchin. A small-time shopkeeper is arrested by the police despite being intensely law-abiding. Defended by a political business tycoon, his case becomes the basis for an entire social movement.

== Bibliography ==
- Clive James. At the Pillars of Hercules. Pan Macmillan, 2013.
