= Fable (The Wednesday Play) =

- The Wednesday Play episode
- Episode no.: Season 2 Episode 4
- Directed by: Christopher Morahan
- Written by: John Hopkins
- Narrated by: Keith Barron

"Fable" is a British television play, shown on 27 January 1965 as an episode of The Wednesday Play series on BBC 1. Written by John Hopkins, the play is set in a parallel totalitarian Britain where those in authority are black people, and white people are their social underdogs – a reversal of the situation in contemporary apartheid South Africa.

It was directed by Christopher Morahan and produced by James MacTaggart.

== Cast ==
- Eileen Atkins – Joan
- Ronald Lacey – Len
- Thomas Baptiste – Mark
- Barbara Assoon – Francesca
- Carmen Munroe – Lala
- Keith Barron – Narrator
- Rudolph Walker – Policeman
- Leo Carera – Editor
- Bari Johnson – Deputy Editor
- Dan Jackson – Overseer
- Sally Lahee – Lilian
- George Roderick – Laughton
- Trevor D. Rhone – Assistant Editor
- John Rapley – Michael
- André Dakar – Head of State
- Frank Singuineau – Minister
- Charles Hyatt – Newsreader
- Thor Pierres – Secretary
- Kenneth Gardnier – Interrogator

== Commentary ==
Hopkins had anti-racist intentions in writing the play. Carmen Munroe has said that for the actors the production was a frightening experience "because suddenly you were being asked to perform the sorts of acts that were performed against you in real life".

The programme's original screening, scheduled for 20 January 1965, was postponed by the BBC for one week "to avoid accentuating the colour issue" during the Leyton by-election to be held on 21 January. In an era when negative responses to immigration were very high audience research at the time of the original broadcast suggested that some whites in the audience saw the role reversal as threatening and reinforced their racist views.

== See also ==
- BabaKiueria – a 1986 Australian mockumentary about an oppressed white minority in a society dominated by Aboriginal Australians.
- White Man's Burden – a 1995 film about similar subject matter.
- Noughts and Crosses (TV series) – a 2020 television series, based on the novels by Malorie Blackman, about similar subject matter.
