= In the Absence of Mrs. Petersen =

1966 novel by Nigel Balchin

- First edition
- Author: Nigel Balchin
- Language: English
- Genre: Thriller
- Publisher: Collins
- Publication date: 1966
- Publication place: United Kingdom
- Media type: Print

In the Absence of Mrs. Petersen is a 1966 thriller novel by the British writer Nigel Balchin. After the death of his wife, a writer is persuaded by a woman who resembles his wife to pose as her husband and travel with her to her home country of Yugoslavia to retrieve some of her family's wealth.

== Bibliography ==
- Clive James. At the Pillars of Hercules. Pan Macmillan, 2013.
