= Seen Dimly before Dawn =

1962 novel by Nigel Balchin

- First edition
- Author: Nigel Balchin
- Language: English
- Publisher: Collins
- Publication date: 1962
- Publication place: United Kingdom
- Media type: Print
- Pages: 191

Seen Dimly before Dawn is a 1962 novel, a story of sexual awakening in adolescence, by the English author Nigel Balchin. Critical reception to the first edition was largely positive.

== Plot ==
The novel relates the internal turmoils of its adolescent protagonist, Walter Parrish, when he is sent to spend a month's holiday on his uncle's decaying fruit farm in the Kent countryside. On his arrival, Walter almost immediately falls in love with his young and beautiful aunt, who he later discovers is in fact not married to his uncle.

Walter finds his physical desires inextricably intertwined with the ideals of romantic love that he has gleaned from his studies of poetry. The affair is one of incompletely–understood emotion, of "things seen dimly before dawn".

== Critical reception ==
Reviewing the first publication of 1962, The Times noted that Balchin's first new book for seven years has a tone that is "light but not comic, sympathetic but not mawkish". The reviewer suggested that the author genuinely likes and comprehends his central characters, and that their relationship is excellently done. The novel was said to be "thoroughly readable and consistently entertaining".

Balchin's 2015 biographer Derek Collett considered that this novel stands out among Balchin's works partly because the central character is a gauche teenager rather than one of the middle-aged professional men that Balchin customarily favoured. He reported that on its first publication the book received glowing notices in the literary columns of The Sunday Telegraph, The Guardian and The Sunday Times. Reviewers noted the fine construction of an enjoyable novel, and Balchin's "usual lucidity, vigour, and devilish readability". Anthony Burgess, writing in The Times Literary Supplement, was a dissenting voice, characterising Balchin as "a general practitioner, producing well-made and highly readable novels which any competent craftsman could have written".
