= Mine Own Executioner =

1947 British psychological thriller drama film

- Film poster
- Directed by: Anthony Kimmins
- Written by: Nigel Balchin
- Based on: Mine Own Executioner by Nigel Balchin
- Produced by: Anthony Kimmins; Jack Kitchin; Alexander Korda (exec producer)
- Starring: Burgess Meredith; Kieron Moore
- Cinematography: Wilkie Cooper
- Edited by: Richard Best
- Music by: Benjamin Frankel
- Production company: London Films
- Distributed by: British Lion Films
- Release date: 22 November 1947 (UK)
- Running time: 108 minutes
- Country: United Kingdom
- Language: English
- Budget: £295,000
- Box office: £158,734 (UK)

Mine Own Executioner is a 1947 British psychological thriller drama film starring Burgess Meredith and directed by Anthony Kimmins, and based on the novel of the same name by Nigel Balchin. It was entered into the 1947 Cannes Film Festival. The title is derived from a quotation of John Donne's "Devotions", which serves as an epigraph for the original book.

== Plot ==
Felix Milne (Meredith) is an overworked psychologist with psychological problems of his own. Molly Lucian seeks Milne's help in treating her husband Adam Lucian; a former fighter pilot, traumatised from his experiences in a Japanese POW camp (and escape from the prison camp). Peter and Barbara spend the evening with Felix and his wife, in a private moment between Felix and Peter, Peter speaks about Barabara desires and suggests Barabara needs help, and subsequently Barabara visits for a consultation. Barbara makes advances, but is rejected by Felix.

Adam meets Felix for a consultation. [Age:28, father: barrister, mother: wife], Adam has a injured leg. Adam Lucian is about to become severely schizophrenic.

Peter and Barabra have a party. Felix suggests Barbara they should meet again in the future. (Felix finds Barbara attractive).

Adam has taken Felix walking stick as a metaphor for needing Felix's support.

Adam steals a Gold cigarette case from Regent's Street for Felix. Adam admits to stealing lots of objects in an attempt to shock. Felix does not care or shocked about the stealing. Adam wants to strangle his wife, as he explains his dream in a session. Felix presses for information about the past prison camp experience, but Adam resists.

Barbara and Felix meet by accident, and go shopping together, purchasing a fur coat for Felix's wife and go on to have a drink together.

Felix presents the coat to his wife for her birthday, she exceptionally pleased. Barbara arrives with a present, and admits to the Advanced knowledge of the coat, having tried on the coat previously. Barbara leaves and a small disagreement ensues.

To make matters worse, Felix finds his own home life deteriorating.

== Cast ==
- Burgess Meredith as Felix Milne
- Kieron Moore as Adam Lucian
- Dulcie Gray as Patricia Milne
- Michael Shepley as Peter Edge
- Christine Norden as Barbara Edge
- Barbara White as Molly Lucian
- Walter Fitzgerald as Dr. Norris Pile
- Edgar Norfolk as Sir George Freethorne
- John Laurie as Dr. James Garsten
- Martin Miller as Dr. Hans Tautz
- Clive Morton as Robert Paston
- Joss Ambler as Julian Briant
- Jack Raine as Inspector Pierce
- Laurence Hanray as Dr. Lefage
- Helen Haye as Lady Maresfield
- John Stuart as Dr. John Hayling

== Production ==
The American actor Burgess Meredith was cast in the lead. At the same time, his wife Paulette Goddard was also hired by Alexander Korda to appear in An Ideal Husband (1947).

Australian Frederic Hilton worked as technical adviser.

== Reception ==
The New York Times noted a "serious, adult and highly interesting film drama both in point of view and execution," singling out the work of writer Balchin, director Kimmins, and producer Korda, alongside stars Burgess Meredith and Kieron Moore.

As of 30 June 1949, the film had earned £143,632 in the UK of which £101,963 went to the producer.

The film was picketed on its US release by the Sons of Liberty, an anti-British group active at the time. The picketing was part of the group's call to boycott British films and products, and had little to do with Mine Own Executioner itself.
