= Lord, I Was Afraid =

1947 novel by Nigel Balchin

- First edition
- Author: Nigel Balchin
- Language: English
- Genre: Drama
- Publisher: Collins
- Publication date: 1947
- Publication place: United Kingdom
- Media type: Print

Lord, I Was Afraid is a 1947 novel by the British writer Nigel Balchin. It sold 11,000 copies in hardback.

== Bibliography ==
- Clive James. At the Pillars of Hercules. Pan Macmillan, 2013.
