= Charles Morgan (Master of Clare College, Cambridge) =

British academic (1678–1736)

Charles Morgan, D.D. (24 September 1678 – 30 April 1736) was Master of Clare College from 1726 until his death.

Morgan was born in Covent Garden, London, and was educated at Clare College, Cambridge. He became a Fellow of the college in 1700. He was ordained a priest in the Church of England in 1704. He held livings at Thurston, Suffolk and Glemsford. Morgan was Vice-Chancellor of the University of Cambridge between 1732 and 1733.

He died on 30 April 1736, in Cambridge.
