= Suspect (1960 film) =

1960 English film by John and Roy Boulting

- Directed by: John Boulting; Roy Boulting
- Written by: Nigel Balchin; Roy Boulting (additional scenes); Jeffrey Dell (additional scenes)
- Based on: novel A Sort of Traitors by Nigel Balchin
- Produced by: John Boulting; Roy Boulting
- Starring: Tony Britton; Virginia Maskell; Peter Cushing
- Cinematography: Max Greene
- Edited by: John Jympson
- Production company: Charter Film Productions
- Distributed by: British Lion Film Corporation
- Release dates: 15 November 1960 (London, England)
- Running time: 81 minutes
- Country: England
- Language: English
- Budget: £25,000 or $150,000

Suspect (U.S. title: The Risk) is a 1960 British 'B' thriller film produced and directed by Roy and John Boulting and starring Tony Britton, Virginia Maskell, Peter Cushing, Ian Bannen and Donald Pleasence. It was based on the 1949 novel A Sort of Traitors by Nigel Balchin.

== Plot ==
Professor Sewell is a scientist whose team discovers a way to eliminate diseases such as bubonic plague. The government blocks their plans to publish their results, fearing the work may be used for germ warfare. While Sewell reluctantly accepts this decision, young scientist Bob Marriott does not, and enlists the help of the sinister Brown, introduced to him by his assistant Lucy's ex-fiancé.

== Cast ==
- Tony Britton as Bob Marriott
- Virginia Maskell as Lucy Byrne
- Peter Cushing as Professor Sewell
- Ian Bannen as Alan Andrews
- Raymond Huntley as Sir George Gatling
- Thorley Walters as Mr Prince
- Donald Pleasence as Brown
- Spike Milligan as Arthur
- Kenneth Griffith as Dr Shole
- Robert Bruce as Levers
- Anthony Booth as Parkin
- Basil Dignam as Dr Childs
- Brian Oulton as director
- Sam Kydd as Slater
- John Payne as Iverson
- Margaret Lacey as Mr Prince's secretary
- Bruce Wightman as Phil, the barman
- Ian Wilson as pin-table man
- Murray Melvin as Teddy Boy
- Geoffrey Bayldon as Rosson
- André Charisse as Heller

== Production ==
The film was made at Shepperton Studios on a limited budget in seventeen days. Sets were designed by art director Albert Witherick.

== Critical reception ==
In The Monthly Film Bulletin Penelope Houston wrote:

Suspect, we are told, was made by the Boulting Brothers "as an experiment in raising the level of the supporting feature". Its shooting schedule was 17 days, which is short for a British picture but would be nothing out of the ordinary by American standards, and its budget was limited. Sadly, with these laudable ambitions, Suspect resembles nothing so much as a prestige TV play. It leans as heavily on dialogue, its range of sets is not much more extensive, and its camera technique is restricted to the plain and conventional. Its subject matter, another of Nigel Balchin's stories of career scientists, with ministerial and security interventions, is approached with an air of superficial knowingness which breaks down quickly under pressure. The security men are too flippantly treated; Whitehall, however cynically viewed, is found to know best; and whatever questions of scientific independence the film might seem to be raising in its dialogue are dodged for a pistols and fisticuffs climax and a comic chimpanzee fade-out. A better standard of low budget film-making is badly needed, but the way to it is not by making pictures which look as though they have strayed from television.

Variety wrote:

Modest, well-made dualer deliberately shot on a shoestring. ... The old theory that a second feature can get away with being shodlily written, directed and produced is not true. The challenging Boulting Brothers set out to prove it with this deliberately designed dualer. Suspect, shot in 17 days, skimps on nothing except possibly running time. ... There's nothing pretentious about this film, but it is entertaining and literate. In the hands of less experienced people, both technicians and thesps, weaknesses might show up through lack of development of characters. But here there are a number of top-notch performances. Tony Britton, as the weak young man; Donald Pleasance [sic], as an insidious spy; Virginia Maskell, the femme link in the research team, Kenneth Griffith, Raymond Huntley and Peter Cushing could hardly be bettered. Thorley Walters, as an apparently vague security officer, adds to his fast growing reputation as a character actor while Ian Bannen, as the embittered ex-pilot who engineers the near-treason, enhances his rep as one of Britain's most significant young actors. Lensing, artwork and editing are all satisfactory. There's no sense in hailing Suspect as anything more than a competent and useful program filler. But if talent can continue to be harnessed to move in swiftly, snap up temporary studio space, and turn out little pix like Suspect then there's some sanity in a world of million-dollar efforts. May it happen more often, for here's a "TV play" which has just that extra polish and knowhow that distinguishes the small box from the big screen.

The Times wrote, "the film is produced and directed by Mr. Roy and Mr. John Boulting; they have made a workmanlike job of what was a workmanlike book".

The Radio Times Guide to Films gave the film 2/5 stars, writing: "This story of spies at a chemical research lab betrays its secret through casting. Nominal stars Tony Britton and Virginia Maskell are awful, and you soon wish splendid supports Peter Cushing, Donald Pleasence, Raymond Huntley and lan Bannen had more to do. The Boulting brothers fail to create the claustrophobia that might have intensified the climate of suspicion, and the casting of Spike Milligan in an espionage drama is the only real talking point."

TV Guide wrote, "at times it is highly crafted, and the careful planning behind the production comes through well. However, the rapid shoot and low budget occasionally give this the look of a made-for-television film, and despite the tautness of the direction, the story is merely a routine thriller."

Leslie Halliwell said: "Entertaining but fairly routine spy melodrama, shot on an experimental low budget but confined to lower berth bookings."
