= Melissa Leach =

British geographer and social anthropologist

Melissa Leach CBE FBA
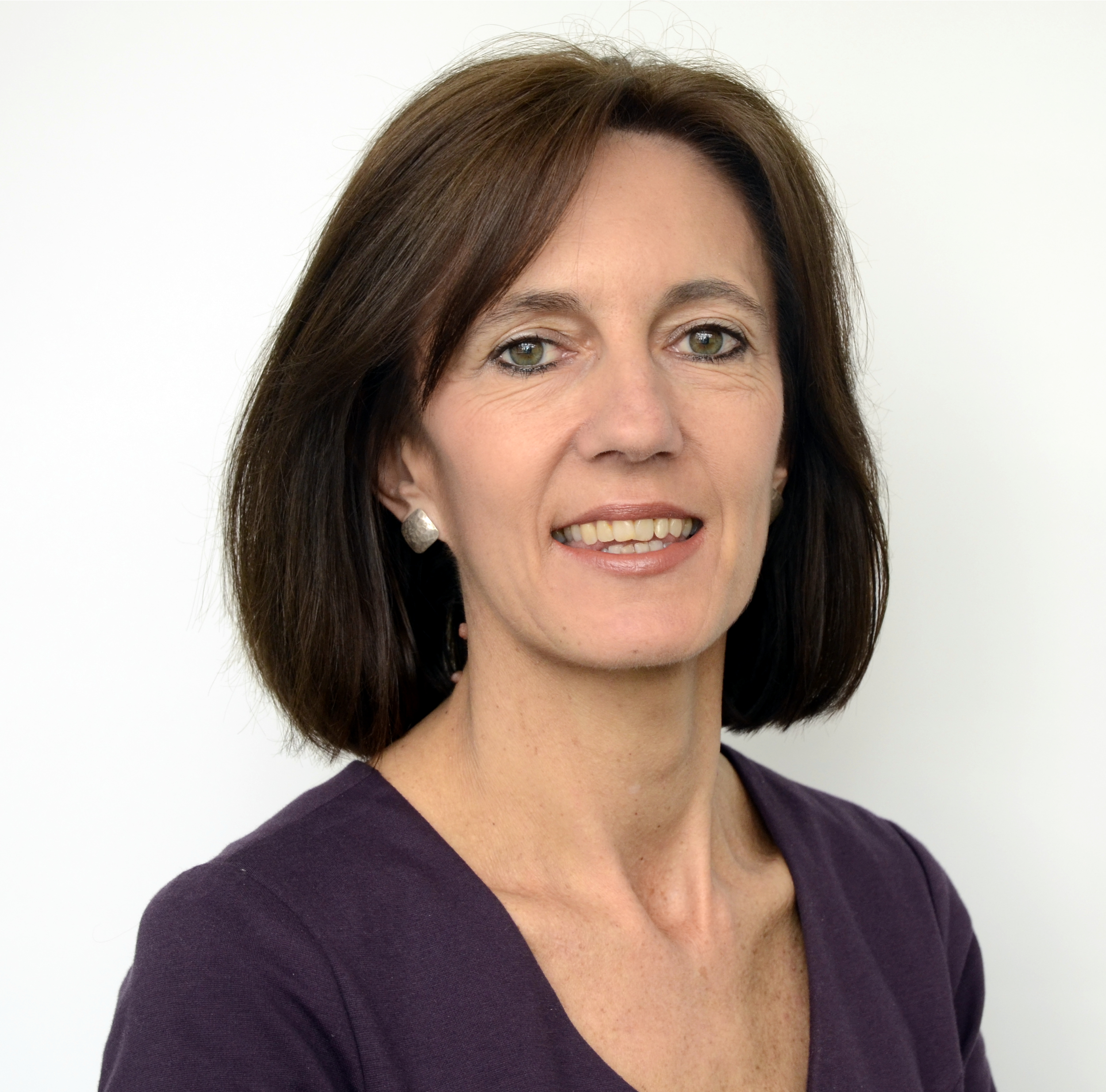
- Born: 5 January 1965 (age 61)
- Education: School of Oriental and African Studies (SOAS), University of London; Newnham College, University of Cambridge, UK
- Children: Four
- Parent(s): Penelope Jane Leach; Gerald Leach

Melissa Leach, CBE, FBA (born 5 January 1965) is a British geographer and social anthropologist. She has been the Executive Director of the Cambridge Conservation Initiative since June 2024. She studies sustainability and development concerns in policy-making and has a focus on the politics of science and technology of Africa. She was previously the Director of the Institute of Development Studies (2014-2024) located on the University of Sussex campus.

== Education ==
She earned her BA in geography with starred first honours at the University of Cambridge, and her MPhil and PhD in social anthropology from the SOAS University of London. Leach co-founded and directed the ESRC STEPS (Social, Technological and Environmental Pathways to Sustainability) Centre from 2006 to 2014.

== Awards and honours ==
- 1998: Amaury Talbot Prize of the Royal Anthropological Institute, for best book in African Anthropology, for 'Misreading the African Landscape'.
- 2012: European Association for the Study of Science and Technology Ziman Prize for public engagement with science, for STEPS Centre 'New Manifesto' initiative.
- 2016: ESRC Outstanding International Impact Award for Ebola Response Anthropology Platform (ERAP).
- 2017: Leach was appointed Commander of the Order of the British Empire (CBE) in the 2017 Birthday Honours for services to the social sciences.
- 2017: In July 2017, she was elected a Fellow of the British Academy (FBA), the United Kingdom's national academy for the humanities and social sciences.

== Membership and professional activities ==
- Vice-Chair of the Science Committee of Future Earth, steering development of agenda around planetary futures, sustainability and post-2015 development.
- Member of the International Panel of Experts on Sustainable Food Systems (IPES-Food).
- Lead author of the UN Women 2014 World Survey on the Role of Women in Development on gender equality and sustainable development.
- Co-Leader, ISSC World Social Science Report 2016 on Inequalities and Social justice.
- Trustee, Malaria Consortium
- Advisory Board member, ESRC ‘Nexus Network: New connections in food, energy, water and the environment’.
- UK Scientific Advisory Group for Emergencies (SAGE) Ebola, 2014 – 15.
- Member of the Scientific Advisory Council of the Stockholm Environment Institute.

== Selected publications ==
- Leach, M. and Scoones, I. eds., 2015. Carbon conflicts and forest landscapes in Africa. Routledge.
- Leach, M., 2015. "The Ebola Crisis and Post‐2015 Development". Journal of International Development, 27(6), pp. 816–834.
- Leach, M., Raworth, K. and Rockström, J., 2013. "Between social and planetary boundaries: Navigating pathways in the safe and just space for humanity". World Social Science Report, 2013, pp. 84–89.
- Fairhead, J., Leach, M. and Scoones, I., 2012. "Green Grabbing: a new appropriation of nature?". Journal of Peasant Studies, 39(2), pp. 237–261.
- Leach, M., Scoones, I. and Wynne, B., 2005. Science and citizens: globalisation and the challenge of engagement (Vol. 2). Zed Books.
- Fairhead, J. and M. Leach, 1996, Misreading the African landscape: society and ecology in a forest-Savanna mosaic. Cambridge and New York: Cambridge University Press.
- Leach, M., Mearns, R. and Scoones, I., 1999. "Environmental entitlements: dynamics and institutions in community-based natural resource management". World Development, 27(2), pp. 225–247.
- Leach, M. and Mearns, R., 1996. Environmental change and policy. The Lie of the Land: challenging received wisdom on the African environment. Oxford: James Currey, pp. 1–33.
- Leach, M. and R. Mearns, 1996, The Lie of the land: Challenging received wisdom on the African environment. Oxford: James Currey Publishers Ltd. and New York: Heinemann
- Leach, M., 1994, Rainforest relations: Gender and resource use among the Mende of Gola, Sierra Leone. Edinburgh: Edinburgh University Press and Washington: Smithsonian Institution
