= The Fall of the Sparrow =

1955 novel by Nigel Balchin

- First edition
- Author: Nigel Balchin
- Language: English
- Genre: Drama
- Publisher: Collins
- Publication date: 1955
- Publication place: United Kingdom
- Media type: Print

The Fall of the Sparrow is a 1955 novel by the British writer Nigel Balchin. It tells the story of two men who are educated together and fight in the Second World War before one of them goes off the rails and winds up in court.

== Bibliography ==
- Clive James. At the Pillars of Hercules. Pan Macmillan, 2013.
