= Sundry Creditors =

1953 novel by Nigel Balchin

- First edition
- Author: Nigel Balchin
- Language: English
- Genre: Drama
- Publisher: Collins
- Publication date: 1953
- Publication place: United Kingdom
- Media type: Print

Sundry Creditors is a 1953 novel by the British writer Nigel Balchin. A Midlands engineering company is inherited from his elder brother by a ruthless businessman who attempts to seize total control and alienates almost everybody he encounters.

== Bibliography ==
- Clive James. At the Pillars of Hercules. Pan Macmillan, 2013.
