= Frederick Cradock =

English boilerman and George Cross recipient (1886-1943)

- Born: Frederick John Cradock; 3 July 1886; Acton, London, England
- Died: 4 May 1943; Glemsford, Suffolk
- Occupation: Boilerman
- Known for: George Cross recipient

Frederick John Cradock (3 July 1886 – 4 May 1943) was an English boilerman posthumously awarded the George Cross for heroism in his attempts to save a workmate from boiling steam in Glemsford in Suffolk.

== Career ==
A boilerman by trade, he was born around 1886 in Acton, London and enlisted in the Royal Field Artillery in 1915, going on to serve in France and Belgium with the 156th Brigade during World War I.

== George Cross ==
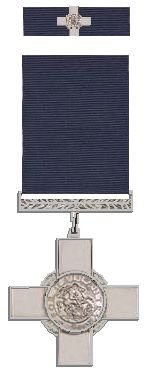
George Cross and its ribbon bar

On 4 May 1943, Cradock and a colleague, Albert Sterry, were working on a boiler when a valve Sterry was fixing exploded, filling the boiler house with scalding steam and boiling water. Sterry was trapped in a well between the boiler and furnace and although Cradock, who was on top of the furnace at the time, could have jumped to safety he called for a ladder and attempted to climb down to rescue his workmate.

He attempted to reach Sterry before being forced back by the heat and being severely scalded. Cradock tried a second time, but despite his gallant efforts Sterry was killed and Cradock died making his rescue bid.

The story was recounted in the Haverhill Echo of 5 May 1943, noting how the explosion had been caused by a piece of metal lodging in a valve which prevented it venting excess pressure.

== George Cross citation ==
Notice of Cradock's George Cross award was announced in The London Gazette on 10 September 1943.
