= Separate Lies =

2005 British drama film

- Theatrical release poster
- Directed by: Julian Fellowes
- Written by: Julian Fellowes (screenplay)
- Based on: A Way Through the Wood by Nigel Balchin
- Produced by: Christian Colson; Steve Clark-Hall
- Starring: Tom Wilkinson; Emily Watson; Rupert Everett; Linda Bassett; Richenda Carey
- Cinematography: Tony Pierce-Roberts
- Edited by: Alex Mackie; Martin Walsh
- Music by: Stanislas Syrewicz
- Production companies: Celador Films; DNA Films; FilmFour; UK Film Council
- Distributed by: Fox Searchlight Pictures
- Release dates: 16 September 2005 (United States); 18 November 2005 (United Kingdom)
- Running time: 85 minutes
- Country: United Kingdom
- Language: English
- Box office: $3.4 million

Separate Lies is a 2005 British drama film directed by Julian Fellowes, who also wrote the screenplay, updating the 1951 novel A Way Through the Wood by Nigel Balchin, which had already been turned into a stage play under the title Waiting for Gillian in 1954. The film stars Tom Wilkinson, Emily Watson and Rupert Everett. Separate Lies marked the directorial debut of Julian Fellowes, who had worked mostly as an actor and won an Academy Award with his screenplay for Robert Altman's Gosford Park.

== Plot ==
James Manning is a wealthy London solicitor. Anne, his younger wife, is accommodating and dutiful and likes the life they lead; the house in London, the Buckinghamshire hideaway.

At a village cricket match, Anne meets William Bule, son of a leading local family, who has recently returned from America.

Anne suggests to her reluctant husband that they should have neighbours over for drinks. However, that evening, James has to work late in the city. Before the party is set to begin, a speeding car sideswipes a man bicycling along a village lane. The man is hurled to the ground and dies a few days later. He was the husband of Maggie, the Mannings' housekeeper.

Anne takes a special interest in Maggie's well-being, but James can't understand why. James notices a scratch on Bill's car, which is removed a few days later. James confronts Bill over lunch, accusing him of the collision. Bill initially denies the allegation, but then confesses and promises to tell the police the next day, although he sees no benefit to it.

Back home, James tells Anne about his conversation with Bill. She opposes Bill's telling the police, but James insists justice be done. When Anne reveals she was the one driving the car, James changes his mind. Anne initially claims she had visited Bill to borrow more drinks for the party, but then admits she has been having an affair with him.

A Buckinghamshire police inspector questions the Mannings and Bill about the accident, and James is torn between doing the right thing and maintaining appearances at all costs. James really loves Anne, and the couple take a trip to Wales in an effort to leave the accident, their guilt, and their marital troubles behind. Anne promises to break off the affair, but James catches her continuing it.

Maggie, whose husband was killed, witnessed the accident. She saw the car and identifies it as belonging to Bill Bule. However, the police suspect her testimony may be biased, since Maggie was dismissed from her previous job after Bule accused her of theft. Anne gave her a new start in the village after she hadn't worked for eight years.

Bule calls a meeting with James and Anne. He says the inspector will come to question them later and that Maggie has identified the car. He requests James to provide an alibi for him, to which James reluctantly agrees. The police inspector meets James at his office to confirm the alibi claimed by Bule.

Anne cannot contain her guilt and tells Maggie that she is responsible for her husband's death. Maggie, who is devoted to Anne, retracts her statement to the police.

Anne goes back to stay with James, until one day he's informed by a cousin of Bule that he is dying of cancer. Learning this from James, Anne rushes back to the dying Bule, and nurses him for 18 months until his death. Bule's father comes to James to express his gratitude for this. At the funeral, James expresses his undiminished love for her, and they have lunch together before she returns to Bule's London flat.

== Cast ==
- Tom Wilkinson as James Manning
- Emily Watson as Anne Manning
- Rupert Everett as William "Bill" Bule
- Richenda Carey as Sarah Tufnell
- David Harewood as Inspector Marshall
- Linda Bassett as Maggie
- Hermione Norris as Priscilla
- John Warnaby as Simon
- John Neville as Lord Rawston
- Philip Rham as French Lawyer
- Terence Stamp as Joe (uncredited)

== Reception ==
On the review aggregator website Rotten Tomatoes, 72% of 88 critics' reviews are positive, with an average rating of 6.8/10. The website's consensus reads: "Though the characters in this tasteful adult drama keep a stiff upper lip, the moral dilemmas are nuanced and the emotional pain feels real." Metacritic, which uses a weighted average, assigned the film a score of 71 out of 100, based on 30 critics, indicating "generally favorable" reviews.

Peter Bradshaw of The Guardian gave the film three out of five stars, writing, "In lesser hands, the characters would be pasteboard, Cluedo-ish types, and to be honest that is what they still are, a bit; but by bringing his formidable wit to bear, Fellowes is able to take them away from the Agatha Christie world and closer to the elegant milieu of Claude Chabrol."

Stephen Holden of The New York Times praised the acting, but wrote, "Out from under Mr. Altman's guiding hand, Mr. Fellowes displays only the most tentative feel for the pageantry of the human comedy that informs every frame of an Altman film, good, bad, comic or tragic."
