= Arkville Maze =

Stone maze art installation

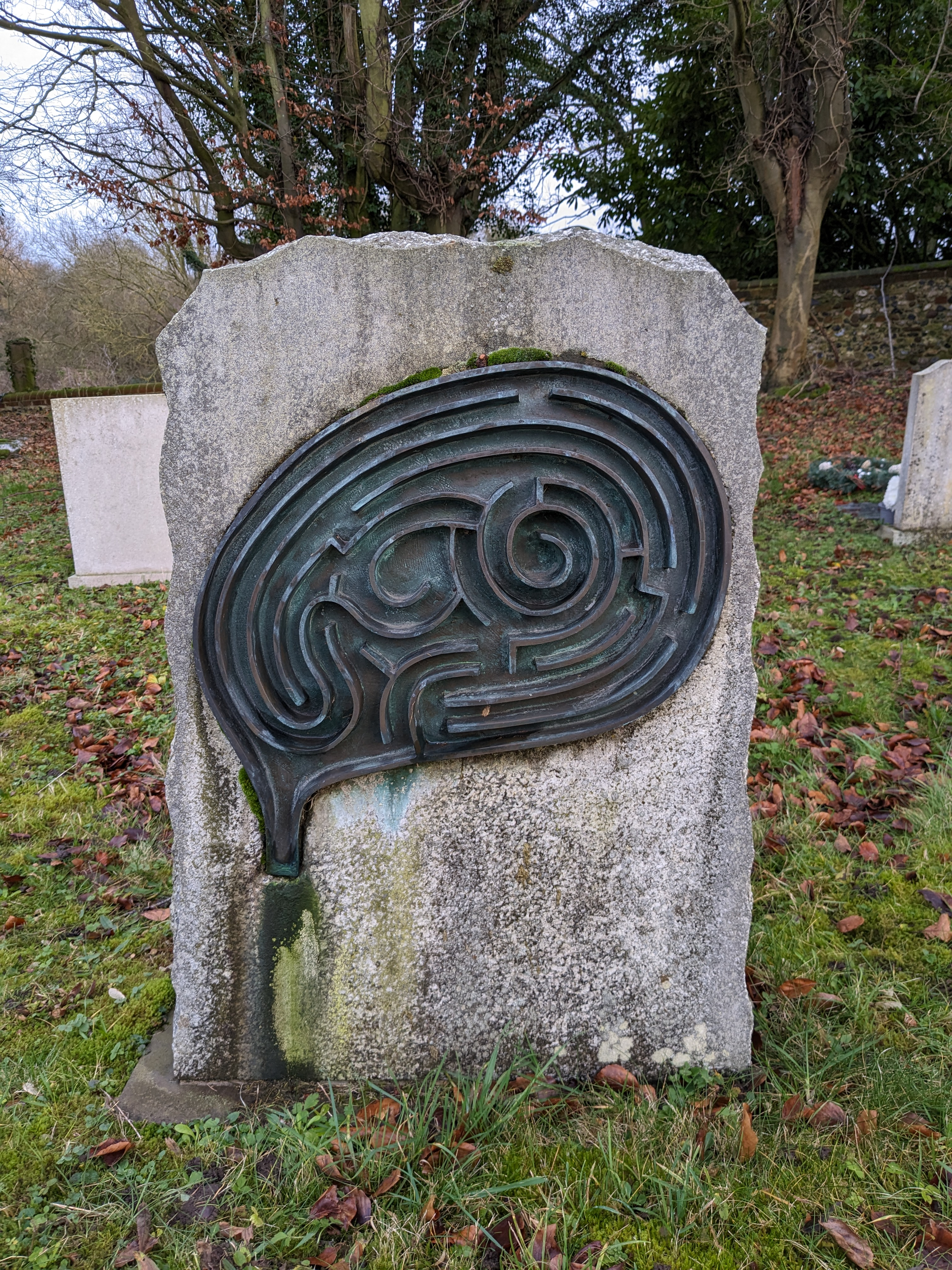
- Headstone of Michael Ayrton, featuring the design of the Arkville Maze.
- Artist: Michael Ayrton
- Year: 1969
- Medium: Brick, Cast Bronze (statues)
- Subject: Representation of the Labyrinth of Crete
- Location: Arkville, New York
- 42.14489°N 74.60621°W

The Arkville Maze is a private maze commissioned by businessman Armand G. Erpf and designed by Michael Ayrton, being constructed at Erpf's estate in Arkville, New York in 1969.

The maze, thought to be the largest brick maze in the world, is inspired by the Greek myth of the labyrinth and features winding paths, brick walls up to ten feet high, and statues including Minotaur of Crete as well as Daedalus and Icarus positioned at its two ending "goals" respectively (the cast bronze Minotaur is one of three made by Ayrton, with one other owned by the Corporation of London).

The maze is semi-subterranean in design with its walls being dug into the surrounding hillside, and spans approximately 1,680 feet (510 m) of walking area.

== Construction ==
The maze, being the largest maze built since Classical antiquity, was reportedly commissioned shortly after Erpf read Ayrton's The Maze Maker – a fictional autobiographical novel from the view of Daedalus, who in Greek mythology built the labyrinth under Crete. Navigating the maze uninitiated takes approximately thirty minutes, while Erpf was reportedly able to navigate to its center in around five minutes.

== 2008 accident ==
Following Erpf's death in 1975 the ownership of the Arkville Maze has transferred with the ownership of the estate. In 2008, a 26-year-old woman died while trespassing in the maze – falling off an abutment while attempting to leave the property.

3D Rendering of Arkville Maze, with pyramid and cylinder representing the placement of the Minotaur and Daedalus/Icarus statues respectively.
