= Penelope Leach =

British psychologist

Penelope Leach CBE
- Born: Penelope Jane Balchin; 19 November 1937 (age 88); Hampstead, London
- Education: Newnham College, Cambridge; London School of Economics
- Occupation: Psychologist
- Spouse: Gerald Leach (m. 1963; died 2004)
- Children: 2
- Parent(s): Nigel Balchin; Elisabeth Balchin (née Walshe)

Penelope Jane Leach CBE (née Balchin; born 19 November 1937) is a British psychologist who researches and writes extensively on parenting issues from a child development perspective.

Leach is best known for her book Your Baby and Child: From Birth to Age Five, published in 1977, which has sold over two million copies to date and won the BMA award for "best medical book for general audiences" in 1998. Leach notes in the introduction to that book: "Whatever you are doing, however you are coping, if you listen to your child and to your own feelings, there will be something you can actually do to put things right or make the best of those that are wrong."

== Early life and education ==
Born in Hampstead, London, on 19 November 1937, Penelope Jane Leach née Balchin is the daughter of the novelists Nigel Balchin and his first wife, Elisabeth. She graduated from Newnham College, Cambridge, with honours in 1959. After Cambridge, she attended the London School of Economics, where she received her PhD in psychology (1964) and lectured on child development.

== Career ==
Her first research positions included a year in the Home Office Research Unit studying juvenile crime and six years at the Medical Research Council Developmental Research Unit. Leach is a fellow of the British Psychological Society (1988), was vice-president of the Health Visitors' Association (1988–1999), and president of the National Childminding Association (1999–2006). She was a founding member of AIMH (The Association of Infant Mental Health) (1998–2002) and is now an adviser. She also worked for the Pre-school Parents' Association and with organisations concerned with children's rights, including the NSPCC (Trustee, 1996–1999) and its sister organisations in Ireland, the US, and Canada, and the Children's Rights Development Unit (1996–2001). As a founder and parent educator of EPOCH (End Physical Punishment of Children) (1988–2004), now CAU (Children are Unbeatable), she has written pamphlets and booklets campaigning against physical punishment and in favor of positive discipline. Since 2009 she has been a Director of the Mindful Policy group which seeks to link psychological research and political policy. Recently she has contributed to work on the Early Years Foundation Stage curriculum, writing the lead chapter to the book Too Much Too Soon?: Early Learning and the erosion of childhood, Hawthorne Press 2011. Between 1997 and 2005, Leach co-directed the largest ever English study of childcare.

Her current research, writing and teaching focuses on contemporary infant neuroscience which in some areas is producing evidence where formerly there were only ideas and opinions. In 2013 she published a chapter entitled "Infant Rearing in the Context of Contemporary Neuroscience" in the Handbook of Child Wellbeing, eds. Korbin and Asher, published by Springer. She is a senior research fellow of the Institute for the Study of Children, Families and Social Issues, Birkbeck, University of London, and of the Tavistock and Portman NHS Trust (1997–). She is a visiting professor at the Faculty of Education, University of Winchester (2013–).

Leach was appointed Commander of the Order of the British Empire (CBE) in the 2022 Birthday Honours for services to education.

== Books and media ==
=== Your Baby and Child ===
Leach's most popular work is Your Baby and Child, which appeared in extensively revised versions in 1988, 1997, 2003 and 2010. The book is divided into five major sections, covering newborns, "settled babies", "older babies", "toddlers" and "young children." Each section includes information on expected developmental milestones and patterns in the areas of sleep, eating, "crying and comforting", speech, and physical growth. The book's central thesis is to illuminate "the successive tasks of development with which [children] are involved, the kinds of thought of which they are capable and the extremes of emotion that carry them along," because "the happier you can make your baby, the more you will enjoy being with her, and the more you enjoy her, the happier she will be".

The popularity of Your Baby and Child led to a television series of the same name on the American cable TV channel Lifetime, which Leach wrote and hosted. The show won a CableACE Award and was nominated for an Emmy.

=== Other works ===
- Babyhood (1974, rev. 1983) – a treatment of academic research on child development from birth to two years, presented for a lay audience
- Parents' A-Z (1983) Penguin Books (UK); US edition The Child Care Encyclopedia (1983); new and revised edition published as Your Growing Child (1986) Alfred A. Knopf – a reference book for parents of social emotional and physical development and problems, from birth to adolescence
- The First Six Months: Getting Together With Your Baby (1986) Collins, Fontana (UK); (1987), Alfred A. Knopf (US) – a photo essay on developing attachment in the first six months of life
- Children First: What Society Must Do – And Is Not Doing – For Children Today (1994) Random House, Vintage – a call to action spelling out the policies society should adopt, in favour of children and the grown-ups who care for them; a polemic suggesting large-scale social initiatives to end child poverty and homelessness and to enable parents better to balance paid work and family
- Child Care Today, Getting it right for everyone (2009) Alfred A. Knopf – who is caring for today's children, what does care cost and who is paying for it? Followed five years as co-director of the Families and Children and Childcare study (familieschildrenchildcare.org)
- The Essential First Year (2010) Dorling Kindersley – a modern guide to pregnancy and parenting in the first year, calling on new research from neuroscience
- Family Breakdown: helping children hang on to both their parents (2014), published in the United States as When Parents Part, Alfred A. Knopf – a guide to minimising the impact of parental separation and divorce on children.

Leach has also produced several home videos sponsored by Barnardo's (Becoming a Family, Baby to Toddler, and Toddler to Child 1987–1988) as well as collaborating on a play, Snap Happy, that toured schools between 1986 and 1991 to teach conflict resolution to preschool and school-aged children.

== Reception ==
Leach has been criticised for her view that young children require one-on-one attention, ideally provided by mothers or family members and which cannot be provided in daycare. Criticism has chiefly been directed towards Leach's purported idolising of mothers and difficulty giving fathers equal importance, and the lack of scientific evidence to support Leach's opposition to child care where the ratio of adults to infants is too low for individualised care.

However, The Essential First Year, published in 2010, has a chapter called "Thinking about working outside your home" which says "Your baby will flourish without you while you are at work as long as he passes seamlessly from your loving care to someone else's and back again on your return...."

After the release of her book Family Breakdown, Leach asserted that there was "undisputed evidence" that sleepovers with a divorced father, who is not the child's primary caregiver, can cause 'emotional damage' to a baby or toddler. Leach's claim has been broadly disputed by other psychologists.

== Family ==
In 1963 she married the science journalist Gerald A. Leach (1933–2004). She has a son, Matthew, and a daughter, Melissa Leach.
