= Christopher Morahan =

British director (1929–2017)

Christopher Morahan CBE
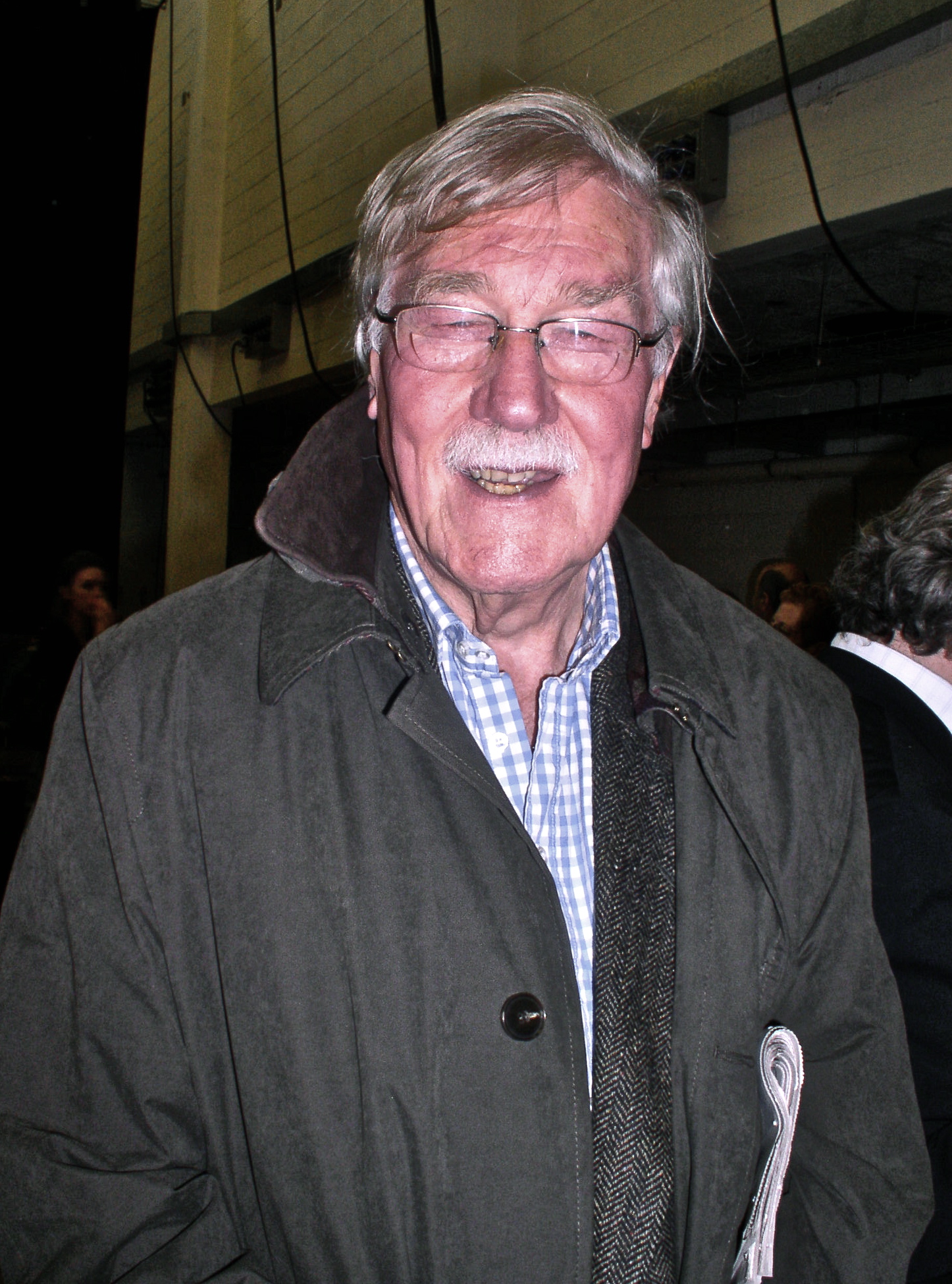
- Morahan at the National Theatre Studio in 2010
- Born: Christopher Thomas Morahan; 9 July 1929; London, England
- Died: 7 April 2017 (aged 87); Guildford, England
- Occupation: Director
- Years active: 1957–2017
- Spouse(s): Joan Murray (her death); Anna Carteret
- Children: 5, including Andy and Hattie

Christopher Thomas Morahan CBE (9 July 1929 – 7 April 2017) was a British stage and television director and production executive.

== Biography ==
=== Early life and career ===
Morahan was born on 9 July 1929 in London, the son of film production designer Tom Morahan (1906-1969) and his wife, Nancy Charlotte Barker (1904-1977), an artist.

He was educated at Highgate School followed by his national service. Originally thinking about a career as an architect, he realised it would be some years before he could earn a living and thus settled on working in the film industry. The director Thorold Dickinson advised him to learn about acting and the theatrical repertoire instead. He trained for the stage at the Old Vic Theatre School from 1947 with actor/director Michel Saint-Denis, designer Margaret Harris, and director George Devine.

Initially an actor, he briefly worked as a stage manager on Orson Welles' touring production of Othello, but refused to work on Welles' next production and found the theatre of the time unenthusing. In a career change of sorts, he joined ATV as a floor manager and, subsequently became a television director from 1957, on Emergency Ward 10, a new ITV series.

=== At the BBC and in the theatre ===
Later, he developed a rapport with writer John Hopkins while working together on Z-Cars. This led to Morahan directing Hopkins' Fable (1965), a Wednesday Play parable locating a reversed South African apartheid in Britain, and the BBC's version of Talking to a Stranger (1966). Morahan gained "brilliant performances from all his cast" wrote Michael Billington of Talking to a Stranger, Michael Bryant, Maurice Denham and Margery Mason being three of the four leads, "but it was Judi Dench as the daughter, forced to reveal her pregnancy to her tight-lipped parents, who astonished everyone. Morahan's first stage production was Jules Feiffer's Little Murders for the Royal Shakespeare Company at the Aldwych Theatre in July 1967, starring Brenda Bruce, Barbara Jefford, Derek Godfrey and Roland Curram.

From 1972 to 1976, he was the Head of Plays for BBC Television, a department responsible for such series as Play for Today and Play of the Month. In this role he commissioned Days of Hope (1975), a four-part serial written by Jim Allen and directed by Ken Loach which covers proletarian life from 1916 to 1926. He managed to appoint Roy Battersby as the director of Colin Welland's Leeds United (1974) despite negative vetting from MI5 which rejected Battersby because of his membership of the Trotskyist Workers Revolutionary Party. While working for the BBC, Peter Nichols was another dramatist with whom Morahan had a successful partnership, but another project with John Hopkins, the six-part play cycle Fathers and Families (1977), was a major disappointment.

=== Later career ===
Morahan joined the National Theatre in 1977 as Deputy Director and was appointed Co-Director of the Olivier Theatre.

He was involved in creating the 14-part television drama The Jewel in the Crown (1984), of which he was co-director and producer. The series won a Primetime Emmy Award and a BAFTA TV Award in 1985. The film Clockwise (1986), with John Cleese in the lead, was a minor hit.

=== Personal life and honours ===
Morahan's first wife was Joan Lucie Murray (d. 1973), with whom he had two sons, including director Andy Morahan; a daughter from the marriage predeceased him. After his first wife died, Morahan married actress Anna Carteret; the couple have two daughters: theatre director Rebecca, also involved in human rights activism, and actress Hattie Morahan.

Morahan was appointed Commander of the Order of the British Empire (CBE) in the 2011 Birthday Honours for services to drama.

Morahan died on 7 April 2017, the same day as Tim Pigott-Smith, one of the leads in The Jewel in the Crown.

== Selected directing credits ==
=== Television ===
- The Road (First Night, 1963)
- Fable (The Wednesday Play, 1965)
- Talking to a Stranger (BBC 1966)
- Lay Down Your Arms (ITV Sunday Night Theatre, 1970)
- Uncle Vanya (Play of the Month, BBC, 1970)
- Old Times
- Fathers and Families (BBC series, 1977)
- The Jewel in the Crown (Granada 1984, three episodes, also producer)
- In the Secret State (1985)
- After Pilkington (BBC, 1987)
- The Heat of the Day (1989)
- Ashenden (1991)
- Unnatural Pursuits (Simon Gray two-part play, 1992)
- A Dance to the Music of Time' (four-part mini-series 1997)

=== Film ===
- Diamonds for Breakfast (1968)
- All Neat in Black Stockings (1969)
- Clockwise (1986)
- Paper Mask (1990)
- Element of Doubt (1996)

=== Theatre ===
- This Story of Yours (John Hopkins), Royal Court (December 1968)
- Flint (David Mercer), Criterion Theatre (May 1970)
- The Caretaker (Harold Pinter), starring Leonard Rossiter at the Mermaid Theatre (March 1972)
- State of Revolution (Robert Bolt), National Lyttelton (1977)
- Sir Is Winning (Shane Connaughton), National Cottesloe (1977)
- The Lady from Maxim's (Georges Feydeau), National Lyttelton (1977)
- Brand (Ibsen), National Olivier (1978)
- The Philanderer (George Bernard Shaw), National Lyttelton (1978)
- Strife (John Galsworthy, National Olivier(1978)
- The Fruits of Enlightenment (Tolstoy), National Olivier (1979)
- Richard III, National Olivier (1979)
- The Wild Duck (Ibsen), Nartional Olivier (1979)
- Line 'Em (Nigel Williams), National Cottesloe (1980)
- Man and Superman (Shaw), National Olivier (1980)
- Wild Honey (Chekhov/Michael Frayn), National Lyttelton (Evening Standard Best Director Award, 1984) and New York (1986)
- Melon (Simon Gray), Theatre Royal Haymarket, (1987)
- The Devil's Disciple (Shaw), National Olivier, (1994)
- A Letter of Resignation (Hugh Whitemore), Comedy Theatre (October 1997)
- Ugly Rumours (Tariq Ali/Howard Brenton), Tricycle Theatre, Kilburn (November 1998)
- Semi-Detached (David Turner), Chichester Festival Theatre (May 1999)
- The Importance of Being Earnest (Wilde), Chichester Festival Theatre and Theatre Royal Haymarket (1999)
- Quartet (Ronald Harwood), Albery Theatre (September 1999)
- Heartbreak House (Shaw), Chichester (May 2000)
- Naked Justice (John Mortimer), West Yorkshire Playhouse and tour, (January 2001)
- The Importance of Being Earnest, Savoy Theatre (2001)
- The Dwarfs (Pinter novel, adapted by Kerry Lee Crabbe), Tricycle Theatre (April 2003)
- The Linden Tree (J.B. Priestley), Orange Tree Theatre (February 2006)
- Legal Fictions (double bill: The Dock Brief/Edwin, by John Mortimer) Richmond Theatre and touring (November 2007)
