= The Small Back Room =

1949 British film by Michael Powell and Emeric Pressburger

- Theatrical release poster
- Directed by: Michael Powell; Emeric Pressburger
- Written by: Michael Powell; Emeric Pressburger
- Based on: The Small Back Room by Nigel Balchin
- Produced by: Michael Powell; Emeric Pressburger
- Starring: David Farrar; Kathleen Byron; Jack Hawkins; Leslie Banks; Cyril Cusack
- Cinematography: Christopher Challis
- Edited by: Clifford Turner
- Music by: Brian Easdale
- Distributed by: British Lion Films
- Release date: 21 February 1949 (United Kingdom)
- Running time: 106 minutes
- Country: United Kingdom
- Language: English
- Budget: £232,972
- Box office: £129,732 (UK)

The Small Back Room (U.S. title: Hour of Glory) is a 1949 film by the British producer-writer-director team of Michael Powell and Emeric Pressburger starring David Farrar and Kathleen Byron and featuring Jack Hawkins and Cyril Cusack. It was based on the 1943 novel of the same name by Nigel Balchin.

The theme is the unsung heroes of the Second World War, the "back room boys", gradually coming into their own.

== Plot ==
Sammy Rice is a British scientist in a London "back room" team evaluating new weapons during the Second World War. Their work is constantly frustrated by bureaucrats and poor management.

Disabled and in constant pain from his prosthetic foot, he is drowning in self-pity and feels unworthy of his girlfriend, Susan, a secretary in his department. She puts up with his temper and self-destructive behaviour in the hope she can help him past his woes. Staying away from whisky is key.

Rice, who has a past background in bomb disposal, is drawn by Captain Stuart into a hush-hush assignment probing the secrets of a new Nazi booby trap device. Progress is slow.

In the middle of both bureaucratic and political turmoil affecting their section, Susan urges him to be more assertive at his job, which he takes badly. He goes on a drunken rampage, smashing up his flat, and she leaves him.

Still drunk, Rice receives a call from Stuart informing him that two intact devices have been discovered on Britain's Channel coast. On his arrival there he learns that Stuart has died attempting to defuse the first of the two devices. Before tackling the second, Rice listens to a transcript of comments Stuart made during the disarming process. In a harrowing effort he discovers that the device has two booby traps. He successfully disarms both.

Rice returns to London with his reputation enhanced and his self-esteem restored. Susan tells him he has an urgent meeting with an army colonel whom he had previously supported during a contentious hearing over an experimental artillery gun which the officer had opposed. Rice is offered the opportunity to head the Army's new scientific research unit, with a commission as a major. He accepts.

Returning to his flat, he finds the damage he had done to it repaired, and Susan waiting for him.

== Cast ==
- David Farrar as Sammy Rice
- Kathleen Byron as Susan
- Jack Hawkins as R.B. Waring
- Leslie Banks as Colonel A.K. Holland
- Michael Gough as Captain Dick Stuart
- Cyril Cusack as Corporal Taylor
- Milton Rosmer as Professor Mair
- Emrys Jones as Joe
- Walter Fitzgerald as Brine
- Renée Asherson as A.T.S. corporal
- Henry Caine as Sergeant Major Rose
- Sid James as "Knucksie" Moran, barkeeper and ex-boxer
- Sam Kydd as Private Crowhurst
- Michael Goodliffe as Till
- Geoffrey Keen as Pinker
- June Elvin as Gillian
- David Hutcheson as Norval
- Robert Morley as the government minister (credited as "A Guest")
- Roddy Hughes as Welsh doctor
- Bryan Forbes as Peterson, the dying gunner (credited as Brian Forbes)
- Roderick Lovell as Captain Pearson
- James Dale as Brigadier
- Elwyn Brook-Jones as Gladwin
- Anthony Bushell as Colonel Strang (Royal Engineers OC)
- Julian Somers as Dr Bryan
- James Carney as Sergeant Groves
- Ted Heath's Kenny Baker Swing Group as Hickory Tree Band
- Kenny Baker as trumpeter
- Frederic Lewis as Fred Lewis (credited as Frederick Lewis)
- Patrick Macnee as a committee member (uncredited)

== Production ==
The Small Back Room was to have been a solo directorial effort for Michael Powell after it was announced that Powell and Pressburger were separating after A Matter of Life and Death (1946). The pair did not separate and The Small Back Room marked the reuniting of Powell and Pressburger with producer Alexander Korda after a profitable but contentious time at the Rank Organisation that culminated with The Red Shoes (1948). The Small Back Room was shot at a number of studios: Denham Film Studios in Buckinghamshire; Worton Hall Studios in Isleworth, Middlesex; and Shepperton Studios in Shepperton, Surrey. Location shooting took place at Chesil Bank and St Catherine's Chapel, Abbotsbury in Dorset; Stonehenge on Salisbury Plain; on the Victoria Embankment in London; and at Abbotsbury station.

In his autobiography, A Life in Movies, Michael Powell acknowledged the influence of German expressionist films such as Nosferatu (1922) in leading him towards making films such as The Red Shoes, Tales of Hoffmann (1951) and The Small Back Room.

== Reception ==
=== Box office ===
As of 30 June 1949 the film earned £129,700 (equivalent to £5.15 million or US$6.58 million in 2024) in the UK of which £84,073 went to the producer.

=== Critical ===
The Monthly Film Bulletin wrote: "It is ably produced, and the direction, with one or two lapses, is extremely efficient. The lapse which it is most hard to forgive is that into surrealistic camerawork illustrating Rice's internal struggle with himself when, with his morale at its lowest ebb, he thirsts to open a bottle of whisky. Apart from this, it is an excellent entertainment and there are some very neat cameos of the minor frustrations of the back-room boys' travails. David Farrar turns in a convincing performance as Sammy Rice and has one believing in the reality of his game foot. Kathleen Byron is a moving and long-suffering – perhaps rather too long-suffering – Susan, and there are some good portrayals by Leslie Banks, Jack Hawkins and Cyril Cusack."

Variety said that although the film lacked "the production tricks usually associated with" Powell and Pressburger it was nevertheless "a craftsmanlike job". It praised the performance of David Farrar as "his best role", and lauded the careful casting of the "lesser roles."

In British Sound Films: The Studio Years 1928–1959 David Quinlan rated the film as "good", writing in 1984: "Moving study of human nature, with tense climax."

Leslie Halliwell wrote in 1989: "Rather gloomy suspense thriller with ineffective personal aspects but well-made location sequences and a fascinating background of boffins at work in post-war London."

The Radio Times Guide to Films gave the film 3/5 stars, writing in 2017: "After the sumptuous theatrics of Black Narcissus (1947) and The Red Shoes (1948), Michael Powell and Emeric Pressburger returned to the muted naturalism of their earlier collaborations for this adaptation of Nigel Balchin's novel about scientists feeling the strain in wartime. The pair were obviously uninspired by the lengthy passages of chat in which the backroom boffins bicker about their latest inventions, but their masterful use of camera angles and cutting gives the finale an unbearable tension."

== Accolades ==
The Small Back Room was nominated for a 1950 BAFTA Award as "Best British Film".

== DVD ==
The Region 2 DVD was released in May 2004 by Studio Canal / Warner Home Video. In Region 1, The Criterion Collection released the film in August 2008. The release included an essay, an interview with cinematographer Christopher Challis, an audio commentary and excerpts from Michael Powell's audio dictations for his autobiography.
