= Christian Darnton =

British composer and writer (1905–1981)

Philip Christian Darnton (born Philip Christian von Schunck; 30 October 1905 – 14 April 1981), also known as Baron von Schunck, was a British composer and writer. Amongst his admirers was Vaughan Williams.

== Early life and family ==
He was born in Leeds as Philip Christian von Schunck, the son of Mary Gertrude Illingworth (1871–1952) and John Edward, Baron von Schunck (1869–1940), a landowner who renounced his title before the First World War. Christian's paternal grandfather, Edward, Baron von Schunck, had been born in Leipzig, part of an old German family that had, since 1715, held a Barony in the Holy Roman Empire (Freiherr). He settled in Britain and married Kate Lupton, who had been born into the progressive, land-owning and political Lupton family and educated at the school of her relative Rachel Martineau. Edward died in 1889. Kate survived him until 1913, the eve of the First World War, and insisted in her will that their only son – John Edward, Baron von Schunck – change his surname to that of her father, Darnton Lupton, the former Mayor of Leeds. Thus he and his children dropped the noble von Schunck name in favour of the family name Darnton-Lupton; the surname Darnton was acquired by Royal Licence.

Christian Darnton's father, John Edward, had two sisters; one of whom – Florence von Schunck – had married Albert Kitson, 2nd Baron Airedale of Gledhow Hall, near Leeds in 1890. Baroness von Schunck (née Kate Lupton, d. 1913), lived at the adjacent Gledhow Wood Estate which was where she hosted the wedding breakfast of her daughter and son-in-law. His mother was related to two families of peers, the Holdens and the Illingworths, who, like the Schuncks, had extensive textile interests, which extended to factories in Rheims and an involvement with Belgian lace manufacture.

The family was extremely well-off but whereas his brother Rupert Edward (1895-1975) was educated at Eton, Christian was educated at home by a governess until he was nine, when he began composing. His musical talents were "obvious" by the time he went up to Gonville and Caius College, Cambridge, in 1924. Darnton's teachers included Charles Wood and Cyril Rootham at Cambridge, and Harry Farjeon at the Royal Academy of Music, where he became friendly with his fellow student Walter Leigh. In 1928 he also spent a year studying with Max Butting in Berlin.

His niece was British botanist Sheila Collenette.

== Career and composition ==
Christian Darnton first came to the general public's attention as a composer on 30 March 1927 when his parents financed a whole evening of music for their 21-year-old son at the Grotrian Hall in London. Although he had been receiving other performances independently (including one of his Octet at the same hall four days earlier), the event had the unintended effect of straining his relationships with other composers and critics. Peter Warlock and Cecil Gray in particular went along to disrupt the proceedings, viewing it as an example of unmerited privilege. The concert included his first string quartet, op 23, and the highly chromatic first piano sonata, op 33 (both composed in 1925). The project was widely criticised in the press - the critic in The Times wrote: "it does not amuse us to listen to his amateur modernisms, and we decline to take him seriously until he has shown that he has mastered the laws of music" - and the criticism prompted Darnton's further course of study in Berlin with Max Butting from 1928.

The influence of Butting on Darnton is clear: Butting believed that "music is the expression of social perceptions" and (like Darnton in later life) his composition style showed a dualism of musical thought between austere uncompromising atonalism (as in the Symphony No 3 of 1928) and a more transparent, simplified style intended for mass consumption over the radio (as in the Sinfonietta, also 1928).

After a short spell teaching at Stowe School, Darnton turned to journalism, while continuing to compose. He was assistant editor with The Music Lover under Edwin Evans between 1931 and 1934. But he had to wait until the mid-1930s before his music started to gain performances and a greater level of interest. The BBC Symphony Orchestra played his Viola Concerto with soloist Bernard Shore (who commissioned the work) conducted by Iris Lemare, on 15 April 1936. On 4 February 1938 the same orchestra played Swansong, five songs for soprano and orchestra, setting poems by Robert Nichols, with soloist May Blyth and Constant Lambert conducting. 1939 saw his first real critical success with a performance of the forward-looking Five Orchestral Pieces at the International Society for Contemporary Music Festival in Warsaw.

In July 1940 Darnton's book You and Music was published as one of the new sixpenny Pelican series of mass-market non-fiction paperbacks aimed at general readers (it is No 68). Reviews were generally positive until Percy Scholes (in a May 1941 Musical Times essay) catalogued so many serious and obvious errors (such as “Binary form may be represented by A.B.A.”) that he presented the work as an elaborate joke to trap unwary reviewers. Perhaps the most interesting part of the book, beyond the non-technical explanations of music history, theory, form and orchestration, is the criticisms it contains of modern music. For instance, Darnton challenges the term "English Musical Renaissance", feeling England had produced "no composer of international consequence" in that period.

Darnton joined the Communist Party of Great Britain in 1941. His Communist views led to an abrupt simplification of his musical language as he searched for a more popular, accessible style, but his views may have later hurt his popularity and led to his becoming relatively obscure. The BBC would not broadcast his 1942 cantata Ballad of Freedom (words by Randall Swingler) for reasons of national security. But the overture Stalingrad chimed well enough with the country's sympathies at the time, and received its premiere at the Royal Albert Hall in March 1943. For a few years towards the end of the war Darnton scored a series of patriotic documentary films for the war effort, such as A Harbour Goes to France, produced by the Ministry of Information in 1944, later the basis of the orchestral suite Atlantic.

After the war, Darnton's works included the cantata Jet Pilot and the opera Fantasy Fair (both setting words by Swingler), examples of his more populist style. But disillusioned by his lack of recognition he turned his back on composition from the mid-1950s for two decades. Then came a remarkable renewal (and the return of his dissonant, avant garde style) including the Concerto for Orchestra (1970–73), the String Quartet No 4 (1973) and the Symphony No 4 (1975–8), which had its premiere in September 1981, six months after the composer's death.

Very few recordings of his works have been issued. Peter Donohoe is the soloist on the Concertino for Piano in C major (1948), accompanied by the strings of the Northern Sinfonia. Other than that there are private recordings of the radio broadcasts of the Concerto for Orchestra and the Symphony No 4.

== Personal life ==
Christian Darnton met his first wife, the artist Joan Mary Bell (1905–2001), while he was in Germany. They married in November 1929 and had two sons. While working in civil defence during the war, he suffered a fall that some have interpreted as a suicide attempt, after which his marriage failed. His injuries left him in pain for much of the rest of his life. Darnton then had an affair with the writer Elisabeth Balchin (later Ayrton), the wife of novelist Nigel Balchin. Balchin responded by caricaturing Darnton in his 1942 novel Darkness Falls From the Air (In the novel the poet Stephen is a self-centred poet described as “big and handsome and haunted and so like a creative artist that you wouldn’t have thought he’d have the nerve to go around looking like that.”) He married his second wife, the dancer Vera Blanche Martin, in 1953. Jet Pilot was written to commemorate the death of her son, John Anstee Martin, in a flying accident.

== Selected works ==
- Piano Sonata No 1 (1925)
- String Quartet No 1 (1925)
- Concertino for piano and chamber orchestra (1926)
- Octet (1928)
- Symphony No 1 (1929–31)
- String Trio (1930)
- Violin Concerto (1930)
- Piano Concerto (1933)
- String Quartet No 2 for amateurs (1933)
- Concerto for viola and strings (1933–35)
- Concerto for harp and wind (1934)
- String Quartet No 3 (1934)
- Swansong, five songs for soprano and orchestra, words, Robert Nichols (1935)
- Suite concertante for violin and chamber orchestra (1936)
- Five Orchestral Pieces (1938)
- Symphony No 2 Anagram (1939–40)
- Ballad of Freedom, cantata (1941–52)
- Stalingrad, overture (1943)
- A Harbour Goes to France, documentary film score (1944)
- You Can't Kill a City, documentary film score (1944)
- Piano Sonata No 2 (1944)
- Symphony No 3 (1944–45, rev. 1961)
- Cantilena for string orchestra (1946–47)
- Concertino in C Major for piano and strings (1948)
- Fantasy Fair, opera (1949–51), libretto Randall Swingler
- Jet Pilot, cantata (1952)
- Concerto for Orchestra, 1970–73
- String Quartet No 4 (1973)
- 'Symphony No 4 Diabolus in musica, (aka 20 Minute Symphony (1975–79)
