= The Borgia Testament =

1948 historical novel by Nigel Balchin

- First edition
- Author: Nigel Balchin
- Language: English
- Genre: Historical
- Publisher: Collins
- Publication date: 1948
- Publication place: United Kingdom
- Media type: Print

The Borgia Testament is a 1948 historical novel by the British writer Nigel Balchin. It is written in the form of a journal written by Cesare Borgia shortly before he is due to be executed, recounting his life.

== Bibliography ==
- Daniel S. Burt. The Biography Book: A Reader's Guide to Nonfiction, Fictional, and Film Biographies of More Than 500 of the Most Fascinating Individuals of All Time. Greenwood Publishing Group, 2001.
