= William Falkner (divine) =

William Falkner, D.D. (died 1682) was an English divine.

== Life ==
Falkner received his education at Peterhouse, Cambridge, where he graduated B.A. in 1652, M.A. in 1656, and D.D. in 1680. On 23 July 1679 he was collated by the Bishop of Ely to the rectory of Glemsford, Suffolk. He was also town preacher at the chapel of St. Nicholas, King's Lynn, where he died on 9 April 1682. By his wife Susan, daughter of Thomas Greene, merchant and alderman of Lynn (who died on 30 August 1680), he had several children.

== Works ==
He was a learned champion of the Church of England. His works are:

- 'Libertas Ecclesiastica, or a Discourse vindicating the Lawfulness of those things which are chiefly excepted against in the Church of England,’ 2nd edit. Lond. 1674; 3rd edit. 1677; 4th edit. 1683.
- 'Christian Loyalty; or a discourse wherein is asserted the just royal authority and eminency which in this Church and Realm of England is yielded to the King. Together with the disclaiming all foreign jurisdiction, and the unlawfulness of subjects taking arms against the King,’ London, 1679; 2nd edit. 1684.
- 'A Vindication of the Liturgies, shewing the Lawfulness, Usefulness, and Antiquity of performing the public worship of God by set forms of prayer,’ London, 1680. This was in reply to John Collinges's 'Reasonable Account why some pious Nonconforming Ministers in England judge it sinful for them to perform their ministerial acts in publick solemn prayer, by the prescribed formes of others.' Collinges published a rejoinder to Falkner's reply in 1681.
- 'Two Treatises. The first concerning Reproaching and Censure. The second, an Answer to Mr. Serjeant's Sure-footing. To which are annexed three Sermons preached on several occasions, and very useful for these times,’ 2 parts, London, 1684. Prefixed is the author's portrait, engraved by J. Sturt. These posthumous treatises were edited and dedicated to the Archbishop of Canterbury by William Sherlock, who says that to Falkner he owed all the knowledge he possessed.
