= A Sort of Traitors =

1949 novel

- First edition
- Author: Nigel Balchin
- Language: English
- Genre: Thriller
- Publisher: Collins
- Publication date: 1949
- Publication place: United Kingdom
- Media type: Print

A Sort of Traitors is a 1949 thriller novel by the British writer Nigel Balchin. The title is taken from Shakespeare's Richard II Act 4, scene 1 "Mine eyes are full of tears, I cannot see; And yet salt water blinds them not so much But they can see a sort of traitors here."

== Plot ==
A British biological research team had spent years developing new methods of controlling epidemics. HM Government minister refuses to let them publish their findings that could benefit mankind in case a foreign power uses it for biological warfare.

== Film adaptation ==
In 1960 it was made into a film Suspect directed by the Boulting Brothers and starring Tony Britton and Virginia Maskell.

== Bibliography ==
- Goble, Alan. The Complete Index to Literary Sources in Film. Walter de Gruyter, 1999.
- James, Clive. At the Pillars of Hercules. Pan Macmillan, 2013.
