= John Hopkins (screenwriter) =

English film, stage, and television writer (1931–1998)

- Born: John Richard Hopkins; 27 January 1931; London, UK
- Died: 23 July 1998 (aged 67); Woodland Hills, California, U.S.
- Education: St Catharine's College, Cambridge
- Occupation: Writer
- Years active: 1957–1995
- Spouse(s): Prudence Balchin (m. 1954; div. 1969) Shirley Knight (m. 1969)
- Children: 3

John Richard Hopkins (sometimes credited as John R. Hopkins; 27 January 1931 – 23 July 1998) was an English film, stage, and television writer.

== Biography ==
Born in southwest London, England, Hopkins was educated at Raynes Park County Grammar School, then completed his National Service in the Army from 1950 to 1951. He read English Literature at St Catharine's College, Cambridge, and joined BBC Television as a studio manager on graduation.

Hopkins began his writing career in radio, writing episodes of the BBC serial Mrs Dale's Diary for eighteen months. An attempt to become a trainee television director at the commercial television franchise holder Granada Television was unsuccessful. The company did accept his first play, Break Up (1958), about the end of the marriage of a young couple, although it was only shown in the Granada region. He established himself as a writer beginning when his then father-in-law Nigel Balchin asked him to try to adapt his novels for television, Adaptations of both The Small Back Room (for Sunday Night Theatre) and Mine Own Executioner were broadcast in April and August 1959 respectively. Hopkins then adapted Margery Allingham's novels about the private detective Albert Campion into Campion featuring two six-part serials, Dancers in Mourning (1959) and Death of a Ghost (1960). Hopkins followed with a series based on Rosamund Lehmann's The Weather in the Streets (1961). He wrote his own thriller series, A Chance of Thunder in 1961.

Hopkins wrote over fifty episodes of the BBC police drama Z-Cars, remaining with the series for two and a half years, serving as the series' script editor for a time. One episode featured Judi Dench in the role of a delinquent. This character inspired Hopkins to write what is probably his best remembered work for the small screen, the four-part play sequence Talking to a Stranger (1966) directed by Christopher Morahan, with whom he had developed a rapport while working with him on Z-Cars. Starring Dench, and Michael Bryant, as the adult children of characters played by Maurice Denham, and Margery Mason, Talking to a Stranger was transmitted as part of BBC2's Theatre 625 anthology series. The plays told the story of one bleak weekend from the viewpoints of the four individuals. It won the British Directors' Guild Writers' Award and an Emmy in 1968 after the sequence was shown on American television. Critic George Melly described in The Observer as "[t]he first authentic masterpiece written directly for television". Two Wednesday Plays from this period by Hopkins were Fable from January 1965 and Horror of Darkness broadcast the following March. The former imagines an inverted South African apartheid in Britain (which was postponed by the BBC in case it affected a by-election), while the latter is a rare exploration of homosexuality in the 1960s. Hour of Darkness featured Glenda Jackson and Nicol Williamson in the lead roles.

Hopkins made his feature film debut with the screenplay he co-wrote with director Roy Ward Baker Two Left Feet (1963), a lightweight comedy-drama with Michael Crawford. He received co-screenwriter credit with Richard Maibaum for the fourth James Bond film James Bond movie Thunderball (1965). He co-wrote the screenplay for Leslie Thomas' boys-in-uniform comedy The Virgin Soldiers (1969) and worked on the screenplay for the film adaptation of Man of La Mancha (1972), although he was removed from this project by United Artists when the studio discovered his draft omitted most of the songs from the musical. His screenplay for Murder by Decree (1979) places Sherlock Holmes against Jack the Ripper. The film was directed by Bob Clark and featured Christopher Plummer as Holmes and James Mason as Watson.

Hopkins wrote his first stage play, This Story of Yours, in 1968. Though it had poor reviews when it was staged at the Royal Court. One audience member who was impressed by the play was Sean Connery who chose it as a personal film project which became The Offence (1973). Connery not only produced the film under a deal with United Artists when he returned to the role of James Bond, but also acted in the film version, directed by Sidney Lumet. Hopkins' plays for the stage included Next of Kin, which was produced at London's National Theatre in 1974 with Harold Pinter directing. His play, Find Your Way Home (1970) was produced in London and then on Broadway where it won a "Best Actor" Tony Award for Michael Moriarty.

Hopkins adapted Dostoevsky's The Gambler (1973) for television, it starred Edith Evans and Philip Madoc, and he wrote the two-part television screenplay, Divorce His, Divorce Hers (1973), which starred Richard Burton and Elizabeth Taylor. His later television work also includes the Play for Today A Story to Frighten the Children (1976), and the serial adaptation of John le Carré's novel Smiley's People (1982), starring Alec Guinness, both for the BBC; and the Cold War espionage thriller Codename: Kyril (1988) for ITV. Hopkins' six-play cycle, Fathers and Families (1977), again directed by Christopher Morahan, was unsuccessful.

Hopkins died at his home in Woodland Hills, California, United States, in July 1998, following an accident in which he slipped, hit his head and fell unconscious into his swimming-pool, where he drowned.

== Private life ==
In 1954, Hopkins married Prudence Anne Balchin, eldest daughter of author Nigel Balchin. They had two children, a daughter, Justine and a son, Marlin Jonathan, who died in a childhood accident in 1971. They were divorced in 1969.

In 1969, he married the American actress Shirley Knight; the couple had one daughter, Sophie. His stepdaughter from his marriage to Knight is actress Kaitlin Hopkins, whom he raised.
