= Cassandra Balchin =

British journalist and activist (1962–2012)

Cassandra Marlin Balchin (24 May 1962 – 12 July 2012) was an English freelance journalist, women's rights campaigner and human rights advocacy trainer. She was a leader and consultant for organisations including Women Living Under Muslim Laws and the Association for Women's Rights in Development (AWID).

== Early life and education ==
Balchin was born in England on 24 May 1962. Her mother Yovanka Balchin (later Jane), née Tomich, was a Yugoslavian refugee and a journalist. Her father was psychologist and writer Nigel Balchin (1908–1970). She spent some of her childhood with her mother's family in Yugoslavia, and also spent time in Glemsford, Suffolk.

Balchin graduated from the London School of Economics in 1983 with a B.Sc. in government, having studied Russian government and history.

== Career ==
After graduating, Balchin moved to Pakistan to work as a journalist, and lived there for 17 years. During this time she became involved in women's rights, and wrote on the conflict between Pakistani and Bangladeshi law and domestic legislation, with particular focus on human rights violations. She published Women, law and society: an action manual for NGOs and edited A handbook on family law in Pakistan. Balchin later reflected on this time as "the beginning of a love affair with the topic of Muslim family laws."

Balchin returned to the UK in 2000, and helped to establish the UK office of Women Living Under Muslim Laws and the Muslim Women's Network UK, of which she was chair. She raised awareness of how Muslim women in Bolton who were wed bylocal Imams may not be legally married in civil law. She was also critical of the British application of Sharia law, writing that:

"What is being applied in Britain by the 'Sharia Councils' is an interpretation which fuses the worst aspects of a Hanafi Muslim tradition (that is no longer the law in Bangladesh, Pakistan or Egypt), with the worst aspects of traditions from non Hanafi schools ... to produce something that is uniquely British and that is unrecognisable for Muslims in contexts outside Europe."

Balchin was also co-founder of Musawah, the "Sisters in Islam" in Malaysia was involved with Women Against Fundamentalism, and was a senior research consultant with the Association for Women's Rights in Development (AWID) on their "Resisting and Challenging Religious Fundamentalism" project from 2007 until her death. She was a co-founder of openDemocracy 50.50.

== Death ==
Balchin died from cancer on 12 July 2012, aged 50. She was survived by her two adult sons and her mother.

== Selected publications ==
- Balchin, Cassandra, ed. (1994). A handbook on family law in Pakistan. Lahore: Shirkad Gah. OCLC 1041948634.
- Balchin, Cassandra, ed. (1996). Women, law and society : an action manual for NGOs. Lahore: Shirkad Gah. OCLC 717767272.
- Balchin, Cassandra, ed. (1999). Reaching out changing our lives : outreach strategies and Women Living Under Muslim Laws. Colombo: Muslim Women's Research & Action Forum. OCLC 988864209.
- Balchin, Cassandra. The Network ‘Women Living Under Muslim Laws’: Strengthening local struggles through cross-boundary networking. Development 45, pp. 126–131 (2002).
- Balchin, Cassandra (2007). "'Muslim Women' and 'Moderate Muslims': British policy and the strengtheningof religious absolutist control over gender development". In Moncrieffe, Joy; Eyben, Rosalind (eds.). The power of labelling : how people are categorized and why it matters. London: Earthscan. pp. 113–127. ISBN 9781844073955.
- Balchin, Cassandra (2008). Ten myths about religious fundamentalisms (PDF). Toronto: AWID. OCLC 833249050.
