= A Way Through the Wood =

1951 novel by Nigel Balchin

- First edition
- Author: Nigel Balchin
- Language: English
- Genre: Drama
- Publisher: Collins
- Publication date: 1951
- Publication place: United Kingdom
- Media type: Print

A Way Through the Wood is a 1951 novel by the British writer Nigel Balchin. A car accident exposes a family's deep-buried secret.

In 1954 it was adapted by Ronald Millar into a stage play, Waiting for Gillian, which ran in the West End for 101 performances. In 2005 it was turned into a film, Separate Lies, directed by Julian Fellowes.

== Bibliography ==
- Goble, Alan. The Complete Index to Literary Sources in Film. Walter de Gruyter, 1999.
