= Waiting for Gillian =

Play by Ronald Millar

- Original language: English
- Written by: Ronald Millar
- Genre: Drama

Premiere
- Date: 12 April 1954
- Place: Manchester Opera House

Waiting for Gillian is a 1954 play by the English writer Ronald Millar. It is based on the 1951 novel A Way Through the Wood by Nigel Balchin.

It was first staged at the Manchester Opera House before transferring to St James's Theatre in London's West End where it ran for 101 performances. The cast included John McCallum, Googie Withers, Frank Lawton and Norman Pierce.

The play was staged by the Edinburgh Gateway Company in the autumn of 1955.

== Bibliography ==
- Wearing, J.P. The London Stage 1950-1959: A Calendar of Productions, Performers, and Personnel. Rowman & Littlefield, 2014.
