= Michael Ayrton =

English artist and writer (1921–1975)

- Born: Michael Ayrton Gould; 20 February 1921; London, England
- Died: 16 November 1975 (aged 54); London, England
- Resting place: St Botolph's Church, Hadstock, Essex
- Occupations: artist, writer, painter, printmaker, sculptor, critic, broadcaster and novelist
- Spouses: Joan, Elizabeth Ayrton

Michael Ayrton (20 February 1921 – 16 November 1975) was a British painter, printmaker, sculptor, critic, broadcaster and novelist. His sculptures, illustrations, poems and stories often focused on the subjects of flight, myths, mirrors and mazes.

He was also a stage and costume designer, working with John Minton on the 1942 John Gielgud production of Macbeth at the age of nineteen, and a book designer and illustrator for Wyndham Lewis's The Human Age trilogy. An exhibition, Word and Image (National Book League, 1971), explored Lewis's and Ayrton's literary and artistic connections. He also collaborated with Constant Lambert and William Golding.

== Life and career ==
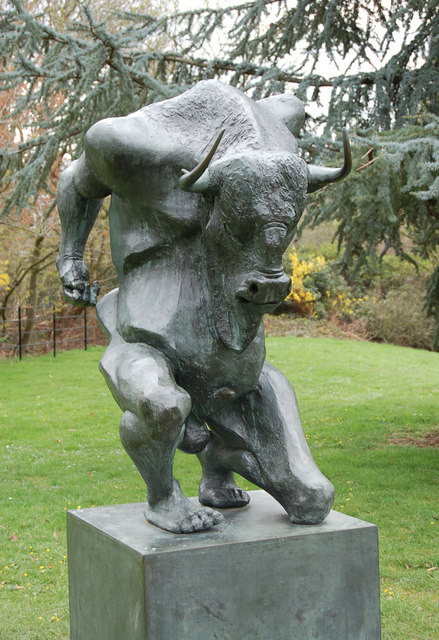
Minotaur at the Yorkshire Sculpture Park

Ayrton was born Michael Ayrton Gould, son of the writer Gerald Gould and the Labour politician Barbara Ayrton, and took his mother's maiden name professionally. His maternal grandparents were the electrical engineer and inventor, Hertha Marks Ayrton and physicist and electrical engineer, William Edward Ayrton. In his teens during the 1930s, he studied art at Heatherley School of Fine Art and St John's Wood Art School, then in Paris under Eugène Berman, where he shared a studio with John Minton. He travelled to Spain and attempted to enlist on the Republican side in the Spanish Civil War, but was rejected for being under-age.

In the 1940s, Ayrton participated in the BBC's radio programme The Brains Trust. He married the novelist and cookery writer Elisabeth Balchin (née Walshe) in 1942 following her divorce from Nigel Balchin a year earlier.

Beginning in 1961, Michael Ayrton wrote and created many works associated with the myths of the Minotaur and Daedalus, the legendary inventor and maze builder, including bronze sculptures and the pseudo-autobiographical novel The Maze Maker (Holt, Rinehart and Winston, 1967). In 1969, he designed the Arkville Maze. He also wrote and illustrated a satirical novel, Tittivulus or The Verbiage Collector (Max Reinhardt, 1953; designed by Will Carter), an account of the career of a minor devil whose original remit was to collect slovenly performances of the Divine Office in monasteries, but who develops, as the centuries pass, into a collector of all kinds of verbiage, and finally, in the modern age, mounts a fascistic revolution in Hell. Ayrton was also the author of several non-fiction works on fine art, including Aspects of British Art (Collins, 1947).

Ayrton died in 1975, survived by his wife. In 1977, Birmingham Museum and Art Gallery organised a retrospective exhibition of his work.

His work is included in several collections including the Tate Gallery, London, National Portrait Gallery, London, Museum of Modern Art, New York, Fry Art Gallery, Essex. Ayrton's work was also featured at the Whitechapel Gallery, London, in an exhibition running from September to October 1955.

In 2021, the artist's centenary year, there were exhibitions of his work (Celebrating Michael Ayrton at The Lightbox Gallery, Woking, UK; A Singular Obsession: A Centenary Celebration of the work of Michael Ayrton, Fry Art Gallery, Saffron Walden, UK; Michael Ayrton's Minotaur Suite, Kruizenga Art Museum, Michigan, USA), and an illustrated monograph, Michael Ayrton: Ideas Images Reflections.

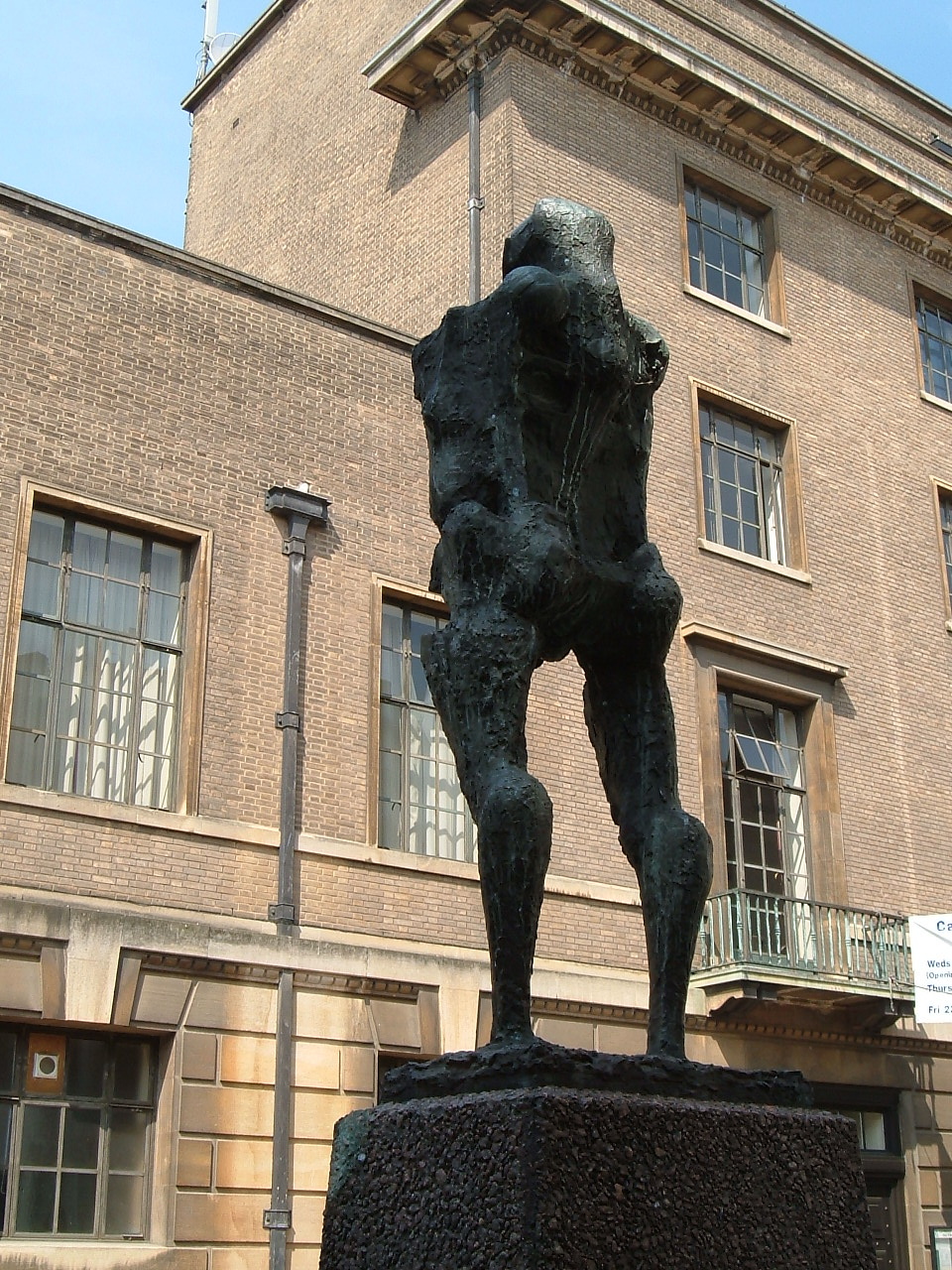
Talos, Guildhall Street, Cambridge

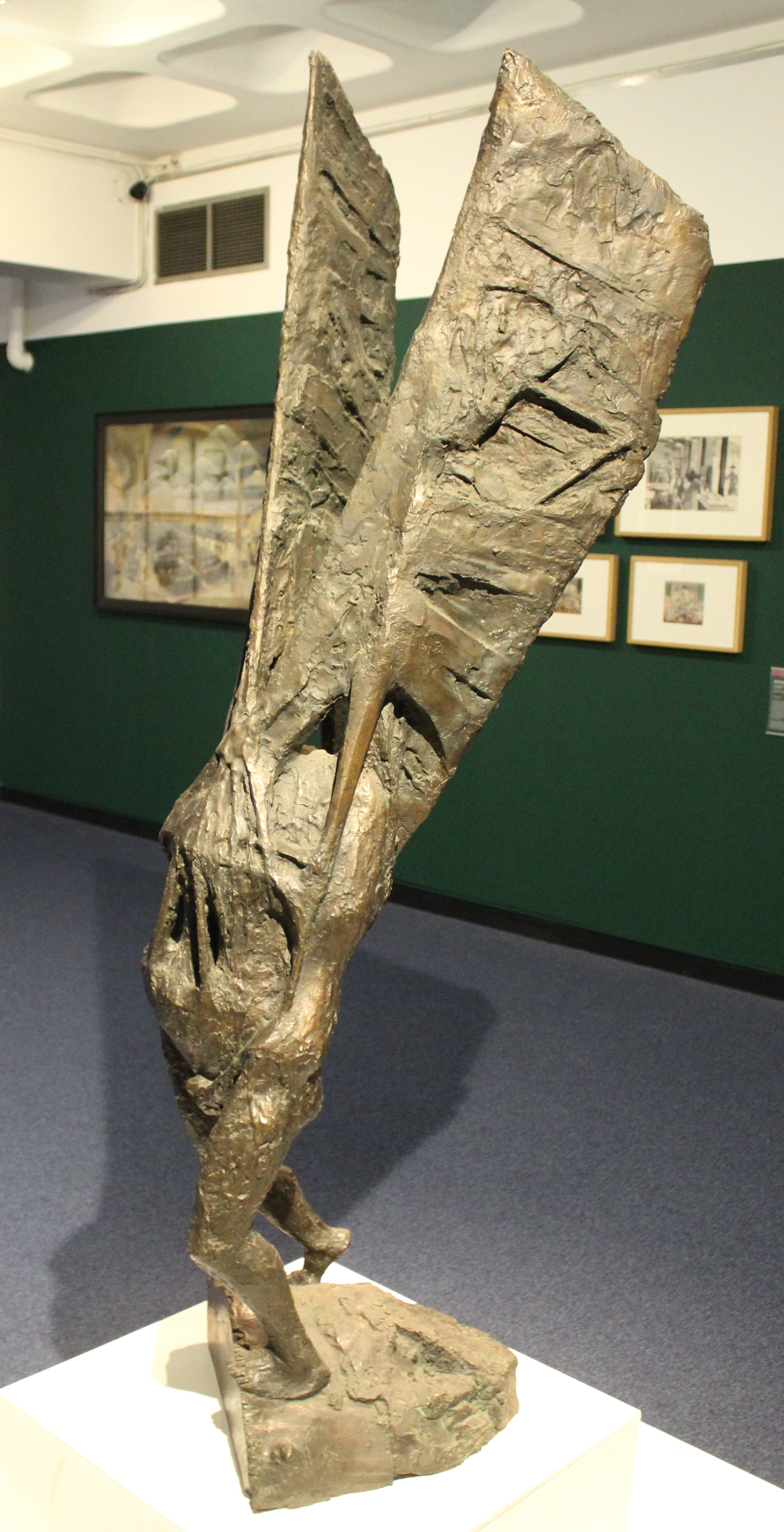
Icarus III, Royal Air Force Museum London

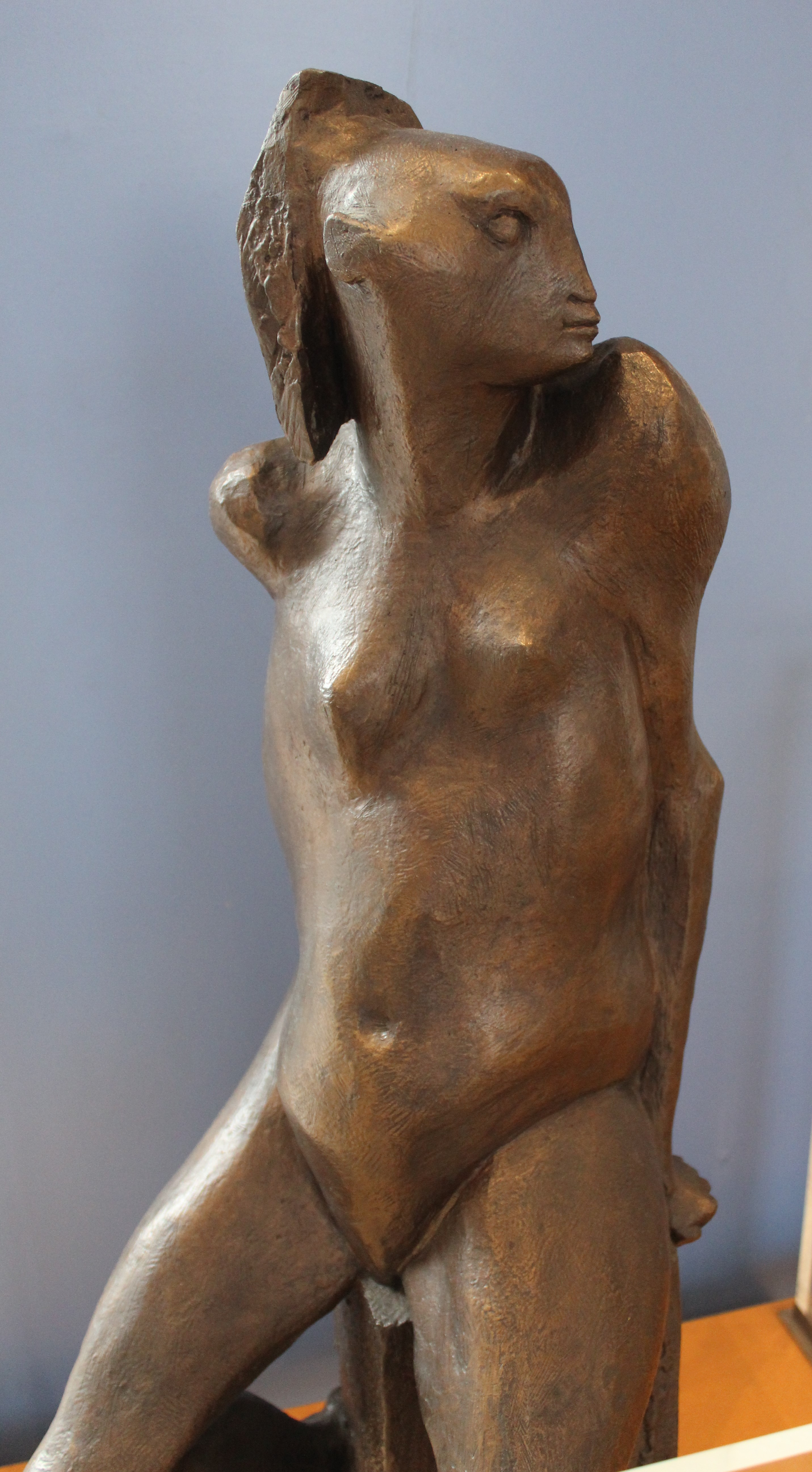
Demeter Pregnant, Reading Museum

== Selected writings ==
- 1945: Poems of Death. Verses chosen by Phoebe Pool, Lithographs by Michael Ayrton. London: Frederick Muller Ltd.
- 1946: British Drawing. London: Collins, ASIN B00149X1DM
- 1947: Aspects of British Art. London: Collins
- 1953: Tittivulus or The Verbiage Collector. London: Max Reinhardt
- 1957: Golden Sections. London: Methuen
- 1961: The Aeschylus Oresteia. New York: The Heritage Press. Translated from the Greek by E.D.A. Morshead, with a foreword by Rex Warner, illustrated by Michael Ayrton.
- 1962: The Testament of Daedalus. London: Methuen. With a foreword by Rex Warner; reprinted, London: Robin Clark, 1991. ISBN 978-0-86072-140-6
- 1967: The Maze Maker: a novel. New York: Holt, Rinehart and Winston
- 1969: Berlioz: A singular obsession. London: BBC Publications
- 1969: Giovanni Pisano: Sculptor. London: Thames & Hudson
- 1970: The Minotaur. London: Genevieve Restaurants
- 1971: The Rudiments of Paradise: Various essays on various arts. London: Secker & Warburg
- 1972: Fabrications. London: Secker & Warburg / New York: Holt, Rinehart and Winston. 1973

== See also ==
- Ankylosing spondylitis
- Icarus complex
