= Elisabeth Ayrton =

British novelist and cookery writer (1910–1991)

- Born: Elisabeth Evelyn Walshe; 2 February 1910; Worplesdon, Surrey, England, UK
- Died: 15 November 1991 (aged 81)
- Education: Newnham College, Cambridge
- Occupation: Writer
- Spouses: Nigel Balchin (m. 1933; div. 1951) Michael Ayrton (m. 1952; died 1975)
- Children: 3 (including Penelope)

Elisabeth Evelyn Ayrton (née Walshe; 2 February 1910 – 15 November 1991) was a British novelist and writer on cookery.

== Life ==
Elisabeth Evelyn Walshe was born in Worplesdon, Surrey, England in 1910. She was the daughter of the novelist Douglas Walshe and the writer Phyllis Sydney. She and her two siblings lived in Worplesdon

Elisabeth was married twice, firstly in 1933 to the novelist Nigel Balchin. She had met him while she was reading English, Archaeology and Anthropology at Newnham College, Cambridge. Their first child, Prudence Ann, was born in 1934. Penelope Jane Balchin was born in 1937, and later gained fame as childcare expert Dr Penelope Leach. During the war Elisabeth worked for the Special Operations Executive, vetting recruits for secret overseas missions. Their youngest child, Freja Mary Balchin, was born in 1944.

Elisabeth's first marriage ended following an affair with composer Christian Darnton, and later a partner-swapping arrangement between the Balchins, the artist Michael Ayrton and his partner, Joan. Balchin divorced Elisabeth in 1951 and she married Ayrton a year later. After her marriage she started to write. She submitted pieces successfully to various magazines, her poetry was read on BBC radio and she contributed to Woman's Hour. Her first novel, The Cook's Tale (entitled Sauce and Sensuality in the USA) was published in 1957. She wrote three further novels: The Cretan (entitled Silence in Crete in the USA) in 1963, Two Years in My Afternoon, (1972) and Day Eight (1978). Her archaeological book The Doric Temple was published in 1957.

Her second husband, Michael Ayrton, died in 1975 and thereafter she combined writing with travelling, running an antiques business and handling his work.

== Cookbooks ==
It was her cookery books that made her name. Ayrton authored her first, Good Simple Cookery, in 1958 (revised 1984). Time is of the Essence followed in 1961. Royal Favourites (1971) was her third cookery book and the first in which she places the recipes in their historical context. Cookery of England (1974) and English Provincial Cooking (1980) continued this combination of history and cookery, as did Traditional British Cooking, co-authored with Theodora FitzGibbon in 1985. She also wrote The Pleasure of Vegetables (1983).
