= The Small Back Room (novel) =

1943 novel by Nigel Balchin

- First edition
- Author: Nigel Balchin
- Language: English
- Genre: Thriller
- Publisher: Collins
- Publication date: 1943
- Publication place: United Kingdom
- Media type: Print

The Small Back Room is a 1943 British thriller novel by Nigel Balchin, a pioneer of the use of computers, who later became Deputy Science Adviser (Army).

In 1947 it was adapted by the team of Powell and Pressburger as a film of the same title starring David Farrar and Kathleen Byron.

== Bibliography ==
- Goble, Alan. The Complete Index to Literary Sources in Film. Walter de Gruyter, 1999.
- James, Clive. At the Pillars of Hercules. Pan Macmillan, 2013.
