= Nigel Balchin =

English novelist and screenwriter (1908–1970)

- Balchin c. 1957
- Born: 3 December 1908; Potterne, Wiltshire, England
- Died: 17 May 1970 (aged 61); Hampstead, London, England
- Resting place: Hampstead Cemetery, London
- Education: Peterhouse, Cambridge
- Occupations: Psychologist, author
- Writing career
- Pen name: Nigel Balchin; Mark Spade
- Website: www.nigelmarlinbalchin.com

Nigel Marlin Balchin (3 December 1908 – 17 May 1970) was an English psychologist and author, particularly known for his novels written during and immediately after World War II: Darkness Falls from the Air, The Small Back Room and Mine Own Executioner.

== Life ==
Balchin was born on 3 December 1908 in Potterne, Wiltshire, the third and last child of William Edwin Balchin (1872–1958), a baker and teashop proprietor, later grocer, and Ada (née Curtis), the daughter of a railway guard. His paternal grandfather, George Marlin Balchin (1830–1898), was a farmer of 800 acres from a long line of wealthy Surrey farmers in Milford. George Balchin moved during the 1870s to Reading to become a storekeeper, but his sudden decision in 1887 to cease work on his farm had a negative impact on the Balchin family's subsequent finances.

At the age of eighteen months, Balchin knocked over a kettle of scalding water, and was so badly burned that he was not expected to survive. He was educated at Dauntsey's School and Peterhouse, Cambridge, where he took a scholarship and became a Prizeman in Natural Sciences. He then worked for the National Institute of Industrial Psychology between 1930 and 1935. For part of this time he was a consultant to JS Rowntree & Sons, where he was involved in the design and marketing of Black Magic chocolates and, he claimed, responsible for the success of the company's Aero and Kit Kat brands.

During World War II he was a civil servant at the Ministry of Food, and then, on the basis of his pioneering work on personnel selection and scientific research, using early computers, appointed Deputy Scientific Adviser to the Army Council, being promoted to the rank of brigadier at the early age of thirty-six. With that and the film of his semi-autobiographical novel The Small Back Room, he became regarded as a prototypical boffin. On 29 October 1954, he was the celebrity castaway on Desert Island Discs. In 1956, he moved abroad to write screenplays in Hollywood, Italy and elsewhere, but was increasingly troubled by alcoholism, and returned permanently to England in 1962. He wrote about the changes in his home village of Potterne and nearby areas on a revisit for The Sunday Times Magazine's Return Journey series published on 6 August 1964. Balchin said "for me, perhaps the strongest formative influence in my early years was Salisbury Plain, itself. I thought, and still think, that those bare windswept chalk downs were one of the most beautiful places in the world . . . . Certainly, they gave me a love of space and tumbling wind [and] a liking for big sweeping views . . .".

== Family ==
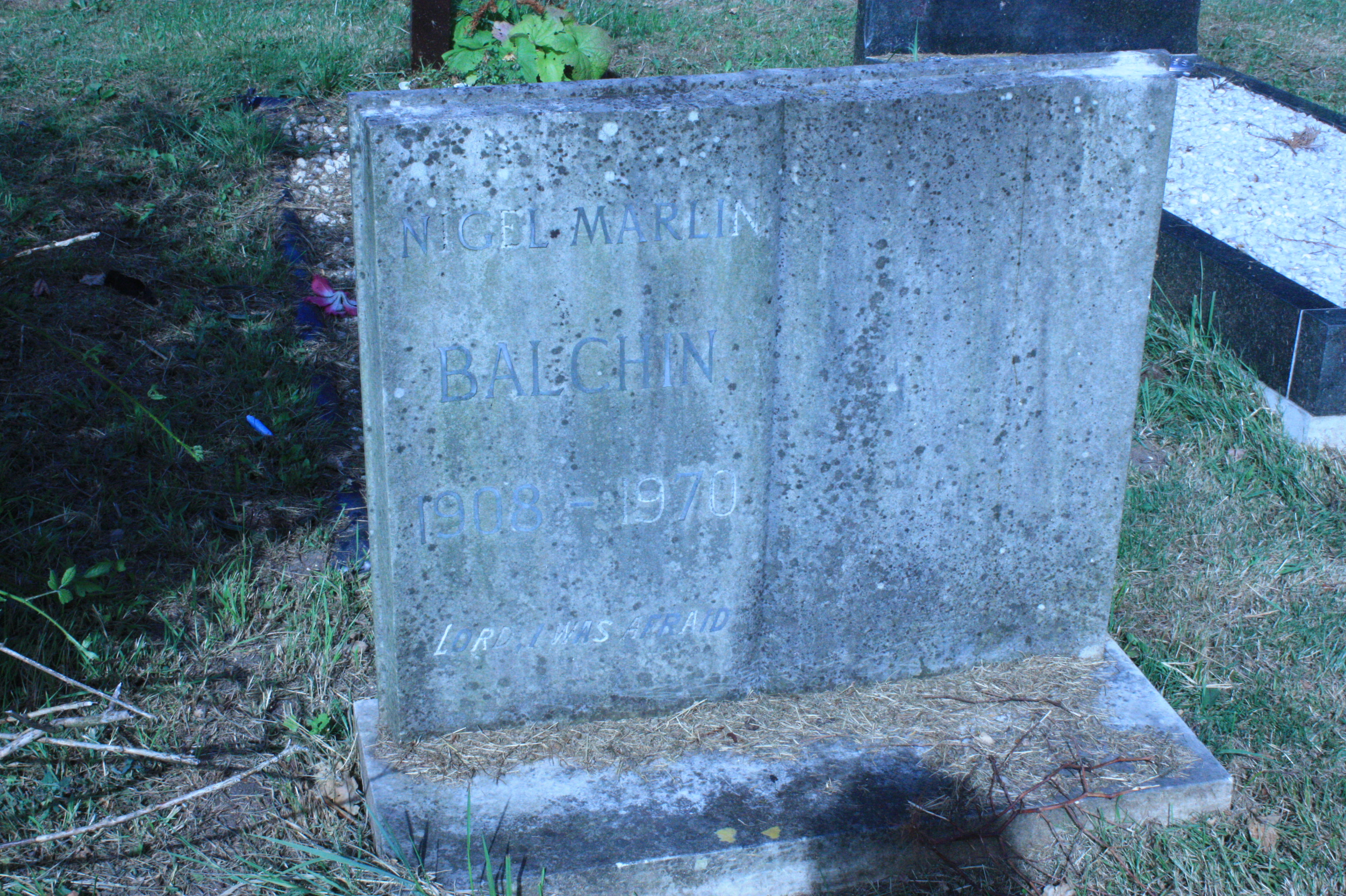
The grave of Nigel Balchin, Hampstead Cemetery, London

Balchin was married twice.

Firstly, on 21 January 1933 at Chelsea, to Elisabeth Evelyn Walshe, daughter of the novelist Douglas Walshe, whom he had met at Cambridge where she was reading English, archaeology and anthropology at Newnham. Their children were:

1. Prudence Ann Balchin (1934–2004), who married Z-Cars scriptwriter John Hopkins (1931–1998) and ran a zoo for many years.
2. Penelope Jane Balchin (born 1937), better known as childcare expert Dr Penelope Leach, who married the science journalist Gerald Leach (1933–2004).
3. Freja Mary Balchin (born 1944), who became the first female president of Cambridge University's theatre group and married Professor Richard Gregory (1923–2010), a psychologist.

His first marriage broke up following a partner-swapping arrangement between the Balchins, the artist Michael Ayrton and the latter's partner Joan. Elisabeth also had an affair with the composer Christian Darnton. Balchin divorced Elisabeth in 1951 and she married Ayrton a year later. Balchin included an unflattering caricature of Darnton as the poet Stephen Ryle in his novel Darkness Falls from the Air (1942).

Secondly, in February 1953 at Marylebone, he married Yovanka (later Jane) Zorana Tomich. They had two children:

1. Charles Zoran Marlin Balchin (born 1955), who held senior roles at the BBC, Sky Sports and various overseas broadcasters.
2. Cassandra Marlin Balchin (1962–2012), an authority on women's rights under Islamic law.

He died on 17 May 1970 at a nursing home in Hampstead, London, and is buried on the edge of the north path in Hampstead Cemetery in north London. His gravestone is small, but distinctive, having the form of an open book.

== Ancestors ==
Ancestors of Nigel Balchin

16. Uriah Balchin (1749-1810)
8. Henry Balchin (1797-1874)
17. Sarah Frost (1758-1842)
4. George Marlin Balchin (1830-96)
18. John Butcher (1766-)
9. Sarah Butcher (1797-1872)
19. Sarah Joyes
2. William Edwin (Willie) Balchin (1872-1968)
20. James Puttock (1764-1849)
10. James Puttock (1805-76)
21. Leah Ede (1779-1828)
5. Sarah Anne Puttock (1833-1917)
22. Thomas Child (1768-)
11. Ann Child (1804-)
23. Sarah Cheasmar (1767-)
1. Nigel Marlin Balchin (1908-70)
24. James Curtis (1777-)
12. Henry Curtis (1813-95)
25. Elizabeth
6. William Curtis (1842-1916)
26. Thomas Spencer (1786-)
13. Elizabeth Spencer (1811-55)
27. Elizabeth
3. Ada Elizabeth Curtis (1870-1939)
28. Samuel Piper (1778-1841)
14. John Piper (1818-)
29. Charity Brook (1773-1850)
7. Elizabeth Harriett Piper (1839-1877)
30. Thomas Whately (1796-)
15. Harriett Whately (1818-)
31. Harriet Dowell (1798-)

== Writing ==
Balchin wrote articles for Punch and The Aeroplane magazine, and published three non-fiction books as Mark Spade.

He also wrote novels under his own name, and enjoyed great popular success for a time. Darkness Falls from the Air is set during the London Blitz and was written while the bombing was still in progress. The Small Back Room became a Powell and Pressburger film of the same title. A Way Through the Wood was adapted as a stage play, Waiting for Gillian, and as the 2005 film Separate Lies, which marked the directorial debut of Oscar-winning screenwriter Julian Fellowes. Other critically acclaimed Balchin novels include A Sort of Traitors, Sundry Creditors, The Fall of the Sparrow and Seen Dimly before Dawn.

As a screenwriter he worked on an early draft of Cleopatra but is principally remembered for The Man Who Never Was, for which he won the 1957 BAFTA Award for Best British Screenplay, and Mandy, the story of a deaf child. He also wrote the screenplay for The Singer Not the Song and adapted two of his own novels for the screen.

== Bibliography ==
=== Magazine Articles by Nigel Balchin ===
- Nigel Balchin (1930s). "The Compleat Modern". Punch.
- Nigel Balchin (1930s). "Various". Punch.
- Nigel Balchin (1930s). "Various". The Aeroplane.

=== Non-Fiction Books by Mark Spade ===
- Mark Spade (1934). How to Run a Bassoon Factory; or Business Explained. Hamish Hamilton, London. OCLC 1046328892.
- Mark Spade (1935). Business for Pleasure, illustrated by W.M. Hendry. Hamish Hamilton, London. OCLC 1079305095.
- Mark Spade (1936). Fun and Games – How to Win at Almost Anything. Hamish Hamilton, London. OCLC 1221705989.
- Mark Spade (1950). How to Run a Bassoon Factory or Business Explained and Business for Pleasure. Hamish Hamilton, London. OCLC 64306962.

=== Novels by Nigel Balchin ===
- Nigel Balchin (1934). No Sky. Hamish Hamilton, London. OCLC 946487463.
- Nigel Balchin (1935). Simple Life. Hamish Hamilton, London. OCLC 730264388.
- Nigel Balchin (1936). Lightbody on Liberty. Collins, London. OCLC 750432392.
- Nigel Balchin (1942). Darkness Falls from the Air. Collins, London. OCLC 723504299.
- Nigel Balchin (1943). The Small Back Room. Collins, London. OCLC 557970682.

made into the 1948 film, The Small Back Room

- Nigel Balchin (1945). Mine Own Executioner. Collins, London. OCLC 1077883764.

made into the 1947 film, Mine Own Executioner

- Nigel Balchin (1947). Satisfactions in Work. OCLC 896674463.
- Nigel Balchin (1947). Lord, I Was Afraid. Collins, London. OCLC 655784256.
- Nigel Balchin (1948). The Borgia Testament. Hulton Press, London. OCLC 4924669.
- Nigel Balchin (1949). A Sort of Traitors. Collins & The Book Society. OCLC 906290090.

made into the 1960 film, Suspect

- Nigel Balchin (1949). Who is my Neighbour?. OCLC 561658304.
- Nigel Balchin (1952). A Way Through the Wood. Book Club, London. OCLC 1184558943.

made into the 1954 stage play, Waiting for Gillian, and the 2005 film, Separate Lies

- Nigel Balchin (1953). Private Interests. Houghton, Boston. OCLC 4924669.
- Nigel Balchin (1953). Sundry Creditors. OCLC 906154029.
- Nigel Balchin (1955). The Fall of the Sparrow. OCLC 3619072.
- Nigel Balchin (1962). Seen Dimly before Dawn. Collins. OCLC 1351246.
- Nigel Balchin (1966). In the Absence of Mrs. Petersen. OCLC 1126673615.
- Nigel Balchin (1970). Kings of Infinite Space. Hamish Hamilton, London. OCLC 877801758.

=== Screenplays by Nigel Balchin ===
- Nigel Balchin (1947). Fame is the Spur.
- Nigel Balchin (1947). Mine Own Executioner.
- Nigel Balchin (1952). Mandy.
- Nigel Balchin (1953). Malta Story.
- Nigel Balchin (1955). Josephine and Men.
- Nigel Balchin (13 November 1955). The Leader of the House. (written for TV)
- Nigel Balchin (1956). The Man Who Never Was.
- Nigel Balchin (1956). 23 Paces to Baker Street.
- Nigel Balchin (1957). Sea Wife (uncredited).
- Nigel Balchin (1958). The Barbarian and the Geisha (uncredited).
- Nigel Balchin (1959). The Blue Angel.
- Nigel Balchin (1960). Suspect.
- Nigel Balchin (1961). Circle of Deception.
- Nigel Balchin (1961). The Singer Not the Song.
- Nigel Balchin (1962). Barabbas.
- Nigel Balchin (5 June 1962). The Hatchet Man. (written for TV)
- Nigel Balchin (1963). Cleopatra (uncredited).
- Nigel Balchin (12 July 1969). Better Dead. (written for TV)

=== Miscellaneous ===
- Nigel Balchin (1936). Income and Outcome. A Study of Personal Finance. OCLC 557970392.
- Nigel Balchin (1939). Pobottle. High Duty Alloys, Slough. OCLC 651738291.
- Nigel Balchin (1947). The Aircraft Builders. An Account of British Aircraft Production 1935-1945. Ministry of Aircraft Production. OCLC 559079703.
- Nigel Balchin (1950). The Anatomy of Villainy. Collins. OCLC 909993025.
- Nigel Balchin (1954). The Worker in Modern Industry. Institute of Personnel Management. OCLC 878285048.
- Nigel Balchin (1955). Last Recollections of My Uncle Charles. Collins. OCLC 909993025.
- Various (1958). Fantasia Mathematica – Imaginaries. Collins. OCLC 1143214091.

an anthology including God and the Machine by Nigel Balchin

- Nigel Balchin (1964). Fatal Fascination (1964) essays by Balchin and three other writers. Hutchinson. OCLC 909993025.
