= The Wednesday Play =

British TV drama anthology (1964–1970)

- Genre: Drama; Anthology; Television play; Social realism; Kitchen sink realism
- Created by: Sydney Newman
- Country of origin: United Kingdom
- Original language: English

Original release
- Network: BBC 1
- Release: 28 October 1964 – 27 May 1970

Related
- Play for Today

The Wednesday Play is an anthology series of British television plays which ran on BBC1 for six series from October 1964 to May 1970. The plays were usually original works written for television, although dramatic adaptations of fiction (and occasionally stage plays) also featured. The series gained a reputation for presenting contemporary social dramas, and for bringing issues to the attention of a mass audience that would not otherwise have been discussed on screen.

Some of British television drama's most influential, and controversial, plays were shown in this slot, including Up the Junction and Cathy Come Home. The earliest television plays of Dennis Potter were featured in this slot.

== History ==
=== Origins and early series ===
The series was suggested to the BBC's Head of Drama, Sydney Newman, by the corporation's director of television Kenneth Adam after his cancellation of the two previous series of single plays. Newman had been persuaded to join the BBC following the success of the similar programme Armchair Theatre, which he had produced while Head of Drama at ABC Weekend TV from 1958 to 1962. Armchair Theatre had tackled many difficult and socially relevant subjects in the then-popular 'kitchen sink' style, and still managed to gain a mass audience on the ITV network, and Newman wanted a programme that would be able to tackle similar issues with a broad appeal. Newman also wanted to get away from the BBC's reputation of producing safe and unchallenging drama programmes, to produce something with more bite and vigour, what Newman called "agitational contemporaneity".

The Wednesday Play succeeded in meeting this aim, and the BBC quickly developed the practice of stockpiling six or seven Wednesday Plays in case there were problems with individual works. One production, The War Game (1965), was withdrawn from broadcast by a nervous BBC under pressure from the government, while John Hopkins' Fable (20 January 1965), an inversion of South Africa's Apartheid system, was delayed for several weeks over fears that it would incite racial tensions.

Intended as a vehicle for new writers, several careers began thanks to the series. Television programmes had a much shorter lead time in this era, and Dennis Potter's first four accepted television plays were shown during the course of 1965. The two Nigel Barton plays (8 and 15 December 1965) first brought him to widespread public attention and the slightly earlier Alice (13 October 1965), about Lewis Carroll's relationship with Alice Liddell, developed themes to which Potter would return.

In the first half of 1966 a series of 26 Wednesday Plays were produced by Peter Luke, the playwright, and story edited by David Benedictus. Highlights included The Snow Ball (20 April 1966), adapted from the novel by Brigid Brophy, Toddler on the Run adapted by Shena Mackay from her novella and directed by James MacTaggart, (25 May 1966), Cock Hen and Courting Pit (renamed A Tour of the Old Floorboards, 22 June 1966) by David Halliwell and two plays by Frank O'Connor (which Hugh Leonard adapted) virtually without dialogue and which, renamed Silent Song, won The Prix Italia award in 1967 for 'original dramatic programmes' jointly with a French programme. The other O'Connor/Leonard work was The Retreat (11 May 1966). These two plays starred Milo O'Shea and Jack MacGowran. Cathy Come Home by Nell Dunn and Jeremy Sandford was offered to the Luke/Benedictus team who passed it on to Tony Garnett.

=== Tony Garnett and Ken Loach ===
Garnett was quickly seen as someone capable of delivering plays which would gain much publicity for the BBC and its Drama department. He had the enthusiastic support of Newman, his immediate superior, who lobbied for increased funding to allow for more location shooting on film rather than shooting productions in the multi-camera electronic television studio, a practice which was felt to impair realism, the preferred mode.

Director Ken Loach made ten plays in all for The Wednesday Play series. Two of them are among the best remembered of the entire run: an adaptation of Nell Dunn's Up the Junction (3 November 1965), and the saga of a homeless young couple and their battle to prevent their children being taken into local authority care: Cathy Come Home (16 November 1966). The latter began Loach's 13-year collaboration with Tony Garnett as his producer, although Garnett had been closely involved with Up the Junction as well.

Plays like Up the Junction though were controversial among more conservative viewers. The 'Clean-Up TV' campaigner Mary Whitehouse accused the BBC of portraying "promiscuity as normal" in Up the Junction and The Wednesday Play as featuring "Dirt, Doubt and Disbelief". The writer on television Anthony Hayward quoted Garnett in 2006: "Mary Whitehouse was on the prowl, which was an added frisson, but it was actually very good free publicity and helped the ratings." The "drama documentary" approach was criticised by television professionals who thought it was dishonest. In a Sunday Telegraph article published before its first repeat transmission Grace Wyndham Goldie complained that Cathy Come Home "deliberately blurs the distinction between fact and fiction ... [viewers] have a right to know whether what they are being offered is real or invented." Loach has admitted that "[w]e were very anxious for our plays not to be considered dramas but as continuations of the news" which preceded The Wednesday Play's slot.

=== Later series ===
The last three years of the strand were predominantly produced by Irene Shubik and Graeme MacDonald; by this time the BBC Drama head Sydney Newman had left the BBC. Highlights from this period include several plays by David Mercer such as In Two Minds (1 March 1967) and Let's Murder Vivaldi (10 April 1968) and Potter's Son of Man (16 April 1969), a modern interpretation of the story of Jesus.

Suffering from declining audience figures, the run of The Wednesday Play ended in 1970 when the day of transmission changed, and the series morphed into Play for Today.

== Reputation and availability ==
It is regarded as one of the most influential and successful programmes to be produced in Britain during the 1960s and is still frequently referenced and discussed. In a 2000 poll of industry professionals conducted by the British Film Institute to find the 100 Greatest British Television Programmes of the 20th century, two Wednesday Plays made the list: The War Game was placed twenty-seventh, and Cathy Come Home was voted the second greatest British television programme of the century.

Some examples of The Wednesday Play, such as The War Game (which was not screened by the BBC for 20 years) and Cathy Come Home (1966), a television play exploring the theme of housing and homelessness, were, according to filmmaker Roger Graef, "a giant wakeup call for the whole nation," and some of the Potter plays, surfaced on VHS and DVD; the Potter play, Alice was a bonus feature of a Region 1 DVD in 2010 of Jonathan Miller's surrealist version of Alice in Wonderland. The Ken Loach material has resurfaced in a Ken Loach at the BBC set, and the two plays directed by Alan Clarke in the Alan Clarke at the BBC set. However, as with much British television of this era, many episodes are lost, leaving 79 surviving in the archives (along with 3 with some surviving sequences) out of 182 transmitted.

== Productions ==
This table is based on records in the BBC Genome archive of the Radio Times. Titles billed as The Wednesday Play (or The Wednesday Play presenting: ...) in the Radio Times listings for their first or a subsequent transmission are included, plus an additional two for the reasons given in the notes. Repeats of the individual productions are excluded, as are some additional repeats from Theatre 625 shown in the Wednesday Play slot during 1968–69 but not billed as such in the Radio Times. All episodes were broadcast on BBC1, with the introduction of colour from November 1969.

The archival status has been ascertained for almost all productions based on the BFI National Archive and TV Brain online databases. Most of the extant versions are in the form of 16mm or 35mm black & white telerecordings (prints or negatives), or in a few cases original film versions where that was the original medium used for production. Some of the later plays exist in videotape formats.

Original air Date	Title	Author(s)	Producer	Director	Performers	Notes	Archive status
28 October 1964	A Crack in the Ice	A story by Nikolai Leskov. Dramatised by Ronald Eyre.	Peter Luke	Ronald Eyre	Bill Fraser; James Maxwell; Derek Newark; Michael Hordern; Jack May; Conrad Monk; John Bay; Peter Madden; Richard Hurndall; Eric Richard	Repeated under Encore on BBC2 4 June 1965.	Yes (35mm tr)
4 November 1964	In Camera	by Jean-Paul Sartre. Adapted for television and directed by Philip Saville.	Peter Luke	Philip Saville	Harold Pinter; Jane Arden; Katherine Woodville; Jonathan Hansen; Andre Boulay; David de Keyser	Repeated under Encore on BBC2 11 June 1965.	Yes (35mm tr)
11 November 1964	Pale Horse, Pale Rider	Katherine Anne Porter	Eric Till		Joan Hackett; Keir Dullea; John Drainie; Ruth Springford; Deborah Turnbull; Arch McDonell	A filmed production by the Canadian Broadcasting Corporation, first broadcast by CBC under Festival, 23 October 1963.	Unknown
18 November 1964	The Big Breaker	Alun Richards	Peter Luke	Charles Jarrott	Rupert Davies; Nigel Stock; Daphne Slater; Edward Evans		Yes (16mm print)
25 November 1964	Mr Douglas	John Prebble	Peter Luke	Gilchrist Calder	Michael Goodliffe; Jean Anderson; Laurence Hardy; Claire Nielson; Gary Bond; Margo Croan	Repeated under Encore on BBC2 30 July 1965.	Yes (35mm tr?)
2 December 1964	Malatesta	by Henry de Montherlant. translated by Jonathan Griffin. adapted by Rosemary Hill.	Peter Luke	Christopher Morahan	Patrick Wymark; Jessica Dunning; Cyril Shaps; John Glyn-Jones; John Hollis; Edward Burnham; Blake Butler; Dallas Cavell; Jack Melford; Reginald Jessup; David Grey; Judy Geeson; David March	Adapted from the play. Repeated under Encore on BBC2 28 May 1965.	missing
9 December 1964	The July Plot	by Roger Manvell. Based on the book by Roger Manvell and Heinrich Fraenkel.	Peter Luke	Rudolph Cartier	John Carson; Charles Lloyd-Pack; Peter Copley; Joseph Fürst; Cyril Luckham; John Lee; John Paul; John Abineri; Graham Leaman; Jeffry Wickham		Yes (35mm tr?)
16 December 1964	First Love	From the story by Ivan Turgenev.	Mario Prizek	Mario Prizek	Heather Sears; Richard Monette	Produced and directed for the Canadian Broadcasting Corporation, first broadcast by CBC under Festival, 22 January 1964.	Unknown
6 January 1965	Tap on the Shoulder	by James O'Connor	James MacTaggart	Kenneth Loach	Lee Montague; Richard Shaw; Griffith Davies; George Tovey; Tony Selby; Tom Bowman; Noel Johnson; Michael Mulcaster; Lucy Griffiths; Michael Collins; Michael Goldie; Tony Caunter	Repeated under Encore on BBC2 17 September 1965.	Yes (16mm (BFI) or 35mm tr (TVBrain)?)
13 January 1965	Sir Jocelyn, the Minister Would Like a Word…	Simon Raven	James MacTaggart	Stuart Burge	Michael Hordern; Alec John; McCowen Phillips; Derek Francis; James Maxwell; Agnes Lauchlan; Leonard Maguire; Gerald Cross; Felix Felton; Colin Jeavons; Christopher Benjamin; Frank Williams; Steven Berkoff		missing
20 January 1965	The Navigators	Julia Jones	James MacTaggart	Vivian Matalon	George Baker; Kathleen Byron; Patience Collier; Terence Woodfield	Shown instead of the originally scheduled Fable due to the latter's postponement, so not listed in the Radio Times but listed as a Wednesday Play in the BFI database.	missing
27 January 1965	Fable	John Hopkins	James MacTaggart	Christopher Morahan	Thomas Baptiste; Barbara Assoon; Ronald Lacey; Eileen Atkins; Keith Barron; Rudolph Walker; Carmen Munroe; Frank Singuineau	Postponed from 20 January 1965.	Yes (35mm tr?)
3 February 1965	Dan, Dan, the Charity Man	Hugh Whitemore	James MacTaggart	Don Taylor	Barry Foster; Ernest Clark; Philip Locke; Dora Reisser; Antony Carrick; Arthur Mullard; Michael Barrington; Michael Brennan	Repeated under Encore on BBC2 1 October 1965.	missing
10 February 1965	Ashes to Ashes	Marc Brandel	James MacTaggart	Alan Cooke	Toby Robins; Scott Forbes; Oscar Quitak; Tony Steedman		Yes (16mm tr)
17 February 1965	Wear a Very Big Hat	Eric Coltart	James MacTaggart	Kenneth Loach	Neville Smith; Sheila Fearn; William Holmes; Johnny Clive; Malcolm Taylor; Alan Lake; Royston Tickner; William Gaunt; James Hall; Ken Jones; David Jackson	Repeated under Encore on BBC2 24 September 1965.	missing
24 February 1965	The Confidence Course	Dennis Potter	James MacTaggart	Gilchrist Calder	Dennis Price; Stanley Baxter; Neil McCarthy; Yootha Joyce; Gilly Flower; Jack Le White		missing
3 March 1965	Campaign for One	Marielaine Douglas and Anthony Church	James MacTaggart	Moira Armstrong	Barry Foster; Jeremy Kemp; David Bauer; Jerry Stovin; Robert Arden; Thomasine Heiner; George Roubicek; David Garth	Repeated under Encore on BBC2 3 September 1965.	missing
10 March 1965	Horror of Darkness	John Hopkins	James MacTaggart	Anthony Page	Alfred Lynch; Nicol Williamson; Glenda Jackson		Yes (35mm tr?)
17 March 1965	A Little Temptation	Thomas Clarke	James MacTaggart	Peter Duguid	Barbara Jefford; Denholm Elliott; Caroline Mortimer; Michael Barrington; Cheryl Molineaux	Recorded in BBC Scotland's Glasgow studios	Yes (35mm tr?)
24 March 1965	Moving On	Bill Mellen	James MacTaggart	Brian Parker	Peter Jeffrey; David Collings; Godfrey Quigley; Jack Watson; Eric Thompson; Kenneth Thornett; Tony Wall; James Appleby; David Brewster; Peter Diamond		missing
31 March 1965	Cat's Cradle	Hugo Charteris	James MacTaggart	Henric Hirsch	Leo Genn; Barbara Murray; Rachel Thomas; Billy Russell; Sheila Dunn	Recorded in BBC Scotland's Glasgow studios	missing
7 April 1965	3 Clear Sundays	James O'Connor	James MacTaggart	Kenneth Loach	Tony Selby; Rita Webb; Glynn Edwards; George Sewell; Kim Peacock; Finuala O'Shannon; Will Stampe; Alec Ross; Eric Mason; Griffith Davies; Ken Jones; Harry Littlewood; Michael Goldie; George Tovey; Jack Cunningham; Haydn Jones; Jack Melford; Reg Lever; Ben Howard; Leslie Bates; David J. Grahame; Desmond Cullum-Jones; James Appleby	Repeated under Encore on BBC2 16 July 1965.	Yes (35mm tr?)
14 April 1965	The Interior Decorator	Jack Russell	James MacTaggart	James Ferman	Barry Foster; Jane Arden		Yes (35mm tr?)
21 April 1965	Auto-Stop	Alan Seymour	James MacTaggart	Brian Parker	David Hemmings; Delphi Lawrence; Kevin Stoney; Janice Dinnen; Katherine Schofield; Jonathan Burn; Gertan Klauber		Yes (35mm tr?)
28 April 1965	The Good Shoemaker and the Poor Fish Peddler	Jean Benedetti	James MacTaggart	John Gorrie	John Barrie; Robert Ayres; Cec Linder; Bill Nagy; John Bailey; Robert Arden	Based on the lives of Sacco and Vanzetti.	missing
5 May 1965	Cemented with Love	Sam Thompson	Peter Luke	Michael Leeston-Smith	Harold Goldblatt; Elizabeth Begley; Anton Rodgers; J. G. Devlin; Denys Hawthorne; Paddy Joyce	Postponed from December 1964. Shown in The Wednesday Play slot and listed as such in the BFI database, although apparently not billed as such in the Radio Times, according to the BBC Genome database.	missing
12 May 1965	A Knight in Tarnished Armour	Alan Sharp	James MacTaggart	John Gorrie	Paul Young; Paul Curran; Hamish Wilson; Brian Cox; Henry Stamper		missing
26 May 1965	For the West	Michael Hastings	James MacTaggart	Toby Robertson	John Castle; Julian Glover; Freddie Jones; Edwin Richfield; Roy Stewart; Nigel Stock; John Stratton; Zena Walker; Gordon Gostelow; Declan Mulholland		missing
2 June 1965	And Did Those Feet?	David Mercer	James MacTaggart	Don Taylor	David Markham; Willoughby Goddard; Patrick Troughton; Sylvia Kay; Jo Rowbottom; Victor Lucas; Anna Wing; Jack May; Kristopher Kum; Donald Morley		Yes (35mm tr)
9 June 1965	The Man Without Papers	Troy Kennedy Martin	James MacTaggart	Peter Duguid	Benito Carruthers; Geraldine McEwan; James Maxwell; Charles Victor; Ingrid Hafner; John Woodnutt; Tom Bowman; Ian Fleming		partial
16 June 1965	The Pistol	A novel by James Jones. Adapted for television by Troy Kennedy Martin and Roger Smith.	James MacTaggart	James Ferman	Clive Endersby; John Brandon; Hal Galili; Walter Sparrow; Steven Berkoff; Callen Angelo; Robert Arden	Repeated under Encore on BBC2 10 September 1965.	Yes (35mm tr?) Incomplete prints - com-opt audio on studio sequences only, film sequences are mute, no music or effects.
23 June 1965	Women in Crisis: With Love and Tears	Colin Morris	Cedric Messina	William Slater	Katherine Blake; Nigel Green; Alan Baulch; Margot Robinson; Margaret Ward; Margaret Denyer; Michael Brennan; Peter Thornton	Repeat of 27 September 1964 Theatre 625 production, substituting the advertised Vote, Vote, Vote for Nigel Barton due to the latter's late postponement.	Yes (16mm tr)
30 June 1965	The Seven O'Clock Crunch	David Stone	Cedric Messina	Toby Robertson	Nigel Stock; Peter Jeffrey; Zena Walker; Jan Waters; Trevor Baxter; June Brown		missing
13 October 1965	Alice	Dennis Potter	Cedric Messina	Gareth Davies	George Baker; Rosalie Crutchley; David Langton; Deborah Watling; John Bailey; Tony Anholt		Yes (35mm tr)
20 October 1965	The Girl Who Loved Robots	Peter Everett	Cedric Messina	Brian Parker	Dudley Foster; Isobel Black; Norman Rodway; Michael Guest; David Dodimead; John Bryans; Geoffrey Hinsliff; Kevin Stoney; Howard Charlton		missing
27 October 1965	A Designing Woman	Julia Jones	Cedric Messina	Brian Parker	Reginald Marsh; Rhoda Lewis; John Collin		missing
3 November 1965	Up the Junction	Nell Dunn	Cedric Messina	Kenneth Loach	Carol White; Geraldine Sherman; Vickery Turner; Tony Selby; Michael Standing; Ray Barron; Rita Webb; Hilda Barry; Jessie Robins; Sheila Grant; George Sewell; Frank Jarvis; George Tovey; Ben Howard; James Haswell; Will Stampe; Gilly Fraser; Anna Wing; Reg Cranfield; James Appleby	Based on the book. Repeated also 14 July 1993 on BBC2.	Yes (35mm tr?)
10 November 1965	The Trial and Torture of Sir John Rampayne	Alan Seymour	Cedric Messina	Peter Duguid	Jack Hawkins; Ian McKellen; Faith Brook; Mary Hinton; Meredith Edwards; Robert James; Morris Perry; Richard Coe; Alan Mason; Rex Robinson; Milton Johns; Bill Lyons; Kenneth Benda; Penelope Lee		Yes (35mm tr?)
17 November 1965	The End of Arthur's Marriage	Christopher Logue and Stanley Myers	Cedric Messina	Kenneth Loach	Ken Jones; Maureen Ampleford; Edward de Souza; Fanny Carby; Toni Palmer; Lucy Griffiths; Nicholas Courtney; Neville Smith		Yes (35mm tr?)
24 November 1965	Tomorrow, Just You Wait	Fred Watson	Cedric Messina	James Ferman	James Chase; Janina Faye; Amelia Bayntun; Tony Selby; Charles Lamb; Joss Ackland; Judy Parfitt; Gábor Baraker		Yes (35mm tr?)
1 December 1965	The Bond	Dawn Pavitt and Terry Wale	Cedric Messina	Mary Ridge	Hannah Gordon; Barry Lowe; Nancie Jackson; Campbell Singer; Joan Young; William Marlowe; Annette Crosbie; Angus MacKay; George Selway; Geoffrey Cheshire; Ian Frost; John Flint; Peter Forbes-Robertson; Kenton Moore		Yes (35mm tr?)
8 December 1965	Stand Up, Nigel Barton	Dennis Potter	Cedric Messina	Gareth Davies	Keith Barron; Jack Woolgar; Katherine Parr; Janet Henfrey; Johnnie Wade; Godfrey James; Llewellyn Rees; Brian Badcoe; Peter Madden; Alan Lake; Ian Fairbairn; Michael Davis; Sheila Dunn	Repeated 11 August 1987 on BBC1, and also 12 June 2004 and 31 January 2005 on BBC4.	Yes (35mm tr?)
15 December 1965	Vote, Vote, Vote for Nigel Barton	Dennis Potter	Cedric Messina	Gareth Davies	Keith Barron; Valerie Gearon; John Bailey; Cyril Luckham; Donald Hewlett; Betty Bowden; Aimée Delamain	Postponed from 23 June 1965. Repeated 18 August 1987 on BBC1, and also 15 June 2004 and 31 January 2005 on BBC4.	Yes (35mm tr?)
22 December 1965	The Coming Out Party	James O'Connor	Cedric Messina	Kenneth Loach	Toni Palmer; George Sewell; Dennis Golding; Will Stampe; Alec Ross; Griffith Davies; George Tovey; Aubrey Richards; Fanny Carby; Ray Barron; Frank Jarvis; Patrick O'Connell		Yes (16mm (BFI) or 35mm tr (TVBrain)?)
5 January 1966	The Boneyard	Clive Exton	Peter Luke	James MacTaggart	Nigel Davenport; Neil McCarthy; Michael Robbins; John Le Mesurier	Originally scheduled for 30 September 1964 (as The Bone Yard, without Wednesday Play billing), but postponed.	missing
12 January 1966	A Man on Her Back	by Peter Luke. From a novel by William Sansom.	Peter Luke	Waris Hussein	Norman Rodway; Valerie Gearon; Barrie Ingham; Jo Rowbottom; Milo Sperber; Hana Maria Pravda; Douglas Ditta; John Baker		Yes (35mm tr)
19 January 1966	Rodney, Our Intrepid Hero	Brian Finch	Peter Luke	Michael Simpson	Graham Crowden; Danny Green; Jim Norton; Jacqueline Ellis; Kristopher Kum; Derek Ware; Alf Joint; Lucy Griffiths		missing
26 January 1966	Calf Love	Philip Purser. From a novel by Vernon Bartlett.	Peter Luke	Gilchrist Calder	Simon Ward; Warren Mitchell; Madeleine Christie; Isobel Black; Deborah Watling; Eileen Way; Nigel Lambert; Lisa Daniely		Yes (35mm tr?)
2 February 1966	Silent Song	Frank O'Connor and Hugh Leonard	Peter Luke	Charles Jarrott	Tony Selby; Leo McCabe; Milo O'Shea; Jack MacGowran		Yes (35mm tr?)
9 February 1966	Who's a Good Boy Then? I am	Richard Harris	Peter Luke	James Ferman	Thora Hird; Ron Moody; Ronald Lacey		Yes (35mm tr?)
16 February 1966	A Game - Like - Only a Game	John Hopkins	Peter Luke	Christopher Morahan	Susan Richards; Alethea Charlton; Stanley Meadows; Shelagh Fraser; Geoffrey Hibbert; David Webb; Peter Ducrow; Jack Wild		missing
23 February 1966	Why Aren't You Famous?	Ernie Gebler	Peter Luke	Peter Sasdy	Alan Dobie; Fionnula Flanagan; Martin Benson; John Forgeham		missing
2 March 1966	Macready's Gala	Hugh Whitemore	Peter Luke	Waris Hussein	Richard Pearson; John Le Mesurier; Barbara Couper; Jane Eccles; Donald Eccles		Yes (35mm tr?)
9 March 1966	A Walk in the Sea	James Hanley	Peter Luke	Geoffrey Nethercott	Mora Nicholson; Kenneth Griffith; Marius Goring; Peter Hawkins; Howard Lang; Harry Littlewood; Keith Pyott		missing
16 March 1966	Boy in the Smoke	Patrick Galvin	Peter Luke	William Slater	Sean Caffrey; Ray Mort; John Sharp; Tony Steedman; John Barrard; Frank Jarvis; Paddy Joyce; Allan Mitchell	Repeat; first shown in the series Londoners on BBC2 13 May 1965.	missing
23 March 1966	Barlowe of the Car Park	Paul Ableman	Peter Luke	Gareth Davies	Jack Woolgar; Annabel Maule; Betty Romaine; Annette Robertson; Donald Hewlett; Michael Robbins		missing
30 March 1966	The Portsmouth Defence	Nemone Lethbridge	Peter Luke	James MacTaggart	Emrys James; Fanny Carby; Deborah Cranston; Maureen Ampleford; Michael Coles; Jerome Willis; Yootha Joyce; Roy Evans; Clifton Jones; John Woodnutt; John Garvin		Yes (35mm tr)
6 April 1966	Pity about the Abbey	John Betjeman and Stewart Farrar	Peter Luke	Ian Curteis	Henry McGee; John Harvey; Suzanne Mockler; Derek Francis; Pamela Ann Davy	Repeat; first shown in the series Londoners on BBC2 29 July 1965.	Yes (35mm tr)
13 April 1966	The Big Man Coughed and Died	Brian Wright	Peter Luke	Peter Duguid	George Baker; Eileen Atkins; John Sharp; Diana Coupland; Nicholas Smith; Harry Towb; Philip Anthony; Martin Friend		Yes (35mm tr)
20 April 1966	The Snow Ball	Brigid Brophy Dramatised by Ursula Gray.	Peter Luke	Charles Jarrott	Patrick Allen; Katherine Blake; Clare Kelly; Trisha Noble		Yes (35mm tr)
27 April 1966	A Cheery Soul	Patrick White Adapted by Jonquil Antony	Peter Luke	Gilchrist Calder	Hazel Hughes; Aubrey Richards; Lucy Griffiths; May Warden; Jack Bligh	Adapted from the play.	missing
4 May 1966	The Connoisseur	Hugo Charteris	Peter Luke	Waris Hussein	Derek Francis; Rosalie Crutchley; Michael Goodliffe; Richard O'Sullivan; Ian Ogilvy; Rosalie Westwater; Stephen Whittaker		Yes (35mm tr)
11 May 1966	The Retreat	Hugh Leonard	Peter Luke	Charles Jarrott	Gerry Sullivan; Harry Webster; Juno Tobin; Gerry Duggan; David Kelly		Yes (35mm tr)
18 May 1966	Ape and Essence	Aldous Huxley Dramatised by John Finch.	Peter Luke	David Benedictus	Alec McCowen; Robert Eddison; Derek Sydney; Petra Markham; Sydney Bromley; Yvonne Antrobus	Adapted from the novel.	missing
25 May 1966	Toddler on the Run	From the novel by Shena Mackay.	Peter Luke	James MacTaggart	Ian Trigger; Anneke Wills; Jerome Willis; Iain Cuthbertson; Renu Setna; Mona Bruce; Michael Robbins		Yes (35mm tr?)
1 June 1966	The Executioner	Robert Muller	Peter Luke	Michael Hayes	Rosalie Crutchley; Sandor Elès; Elizabeth Bell; David Garfield; Meier Tzelniker; Eileen Way; Steven Scott; David de Keyser		missing
8 June 1966	Way Off Beat	David Turner	James MacTaggart	Toby Robertson	Brenda Bruce; Sydney Tafler; Helen Fraser; Gordon Reid; Stephanie Bidmead; Jimmy Hanley; Noel Johnson		Yes (35mm tr?)
15 June 1966	A Soiree at Bossom's Hotel	Simon Raven	Peter Luke	Gilchrist Calder	Fabia Drake; Raymond Huntley; Sarah Lawson; Wallas Eaton; Sally Bazeley; Roddy Maude-Roxby; Barbara Couper; Clive Morton; Henry McGee; Jeremy Young		missing
22 June 1966	Cock, Hen, and Courting Pit	David Halliwell	Peter Luke	Charles Jarrott	Nicola Pagett; Maurice Roëves; June Murphy; Clifford Cox		Yes (35mm tr?)
21 September 1966	Photo Finish	Peter Ustinov	Bernard Hepton	Naomi Capon	Paul Rogers; Robert Brown; James Maxwell; Simon Prebble; Peter Ashmore; Barbara Couper; Daphne Slater; Meg Wynn Owen; Alice Montego; Priscilla Morgan; Michael Bates	Repeat; first shown as a Thursday Theatre on BBC2 28 January 1965.	missing
28 September 1966	A Hero of Our Time	Ian Dallas. Based on the novel by Mihail Lermontov.	Peter Luke	Henric Hirsch	Alan Bates; Mary Miller; Terence De Marney; Jeremy Young; Donald Sumpter; Brigit Forsyth; Michael Mulcaster	Adapted from the novel.	Yes (35mm tr?)
12 October 1966	The Frighteners	Daniel Farson	Peter Luke	Gilchrist Calder	Tom Adams; Griffith Davies; Ben Howard; George Sewell; Frank Jarvis; June Murphy; Peter Ducrow; John Harvey	Repeat; first shown in the series Londoners on BBC2 8 July 1965.	missing
19 October 1966	A Piece of Resistance	Terence Dudley	Cedric Messina	Geoffrey Nethercott	Lally Bowers; William Kendall; Frederick Jaeger; James Villiers; Gerald Cross; Michael Craze; Gábor Baraker	Repeat of 26 December 1965 Theatre 625 on BBC2.	missing
2 November 1966	Where the Buffalo Roam	Dennis Potter	Lionel Harris	Gareth Davies	Hywel Bennett; Megs Jenkins; Glyn Aubrey; Houston Richards; Richard Davies	Repeated also 25 August 1976 on BBC2 and 21 July 1993 on BBC2.	Yes (35mm tr)
9 November 1966	The Head Waiter	John Mortimer	Lionel Harris	Rex Tucker	Donald Pleasence; Peter Madden; Pauline Letts; Alexandra Bastedo		missing
16 November 1966	Cathy Come Home	Jeremy Sandford	Tony Garnett	Kenneth Loach	Carol White; Ray Brooks; Barry Jackson; Geoffrey Palmer; Barry Jackson; John Baddeley; Paddy Joyce; Lennard Pearce; Will Stampe; Lila Kaye	Repeated also 11 August 1976 on BBC2, 23 December 2001 on BBC Choice, 5 June 2003 on BBC4, 11 June 2003 on BBC4, 26 November 2006 on BBC4.	Yes (original negative)
23 November 1966	The Private Tutor	Christopher Williams	Lionel Harris	Alan Gibson	Ian McShane; Marty Cruickshank; Patricia Garwood; Alan Tucker; Christopher Wray		missing
30 November 1966	A Pyre for Private James	Simon Raven	Lionel Harris	Gilchrist Calder	Basil Henson; Percy Herbert; Dudley Sutton; David Conville; Grant Taylor; John Bailey; William Fox; Basil Dignam; Nick Tate; John Garvin		missing
7 December 1966	A Tale of Two Wives	Marc Brandel	Lionel Harris	Peter Duguid	Dinsdale Landen; Peter Jeffrey; Amanda Barrie; Suzanna Leigh		missing
14 December 1966	Little Master Mind	Nemone Lethbridge	Tony Garnett	James MacTaggart	George Sewell; John Porter Davison; Michael Robbins; Robert Russell; Jerome Willis; Yootha Joyce; John Woodnutt; Roy Evans; Charles Morgan; John Garvin; Lila Kaye		missing
21 December 1966	The Mayfly and the Frog	Jack Russell	Lionel Harris	Robin Midgley	John Gielgud; Isa Miranda; David Stoll; Felicity Kendal; Timothy Bateson	Repeated 10 July 1968 under Playbill.	Yes (35mm tr?)
4 January 1967	Person to Person	Joan Henry	Lionel Harris	Raymond Menmuir	Elizabeth Sellars; Robin Bailey; Michael Standing; Michael Wennink		missing
18 January 1967	The Order	Fritz Hochwälder. Translated by Patrick Alexander.	Cedric Messina	Basil Coleman	John Neville; Catherine Lacey; George Coulouris; Laurence Hardy; George Murcell; Clive Morton; John Woodvine; Jerold Wells; James Cairncross; Yvonne Antrobus; Michael Pennington	A Wednesday Play production for The Largest Theatre in the World project of the EBU.	missing
25 January 1967	Everyone's Rich Except Us	Thomas Clarke	Lionel Harris	Brian Parker	Alfred Lynch; Jennifer Jayne; Richard Vernon; Vic Wise; Wallas Eaton; David Hutcheson; Llewellyn Rees; Howard Charlton; Leonard Grahame; Patsy Smart; James Ottaway		missing
1 February 1967	The Lump	Jim Allen	Tony Garnett	Jack Gold	Leslie Sands; Joby Blanshard; James Caffrey; Frank Gatliff; Ken Jones; Paddy Joyce; Neville Smith		Yes (16mm print)
8 February 1967	Who's Going to Take Me On?	Andrew Davies	Lionel Harris	John Glenister	Richard O'Sullivan; Garfield Morgan; George Moon; Trisha Mortimer; Ann Holloway; Derek Seaton; Clifford Cox		missing
15 February 1967	Death of a Teddy Bear	Simon Gray	Lionel Harris	Waris Hussein	Brenda Bruce; Hywel Bennett; Rachel Kempson; Kenneth J. Warren; John Bailey	Repeated 17 July 1968 under Playbill.	missing
22 February 1967	Days in the Trees	Marguerite Duras Translated by Sonia Orwell. adapted by Jeremy Brooks.	Lionel Harris	Waris Hussein	Peggy Ashcroft; George Baker; Frances Cuka; Brian Badcoe; Dallas Adams; Roger Brierley; Noel Collins; Patricia Maynard	A Wednesday Play presentation. Original Royal Shakespeare Company stage production directed by: John Schlesinger.	missing
1 March 1967	In Two Minds	David Mercer	Tony Garnett	Kenneth Loach	Anna Cropper; George A. Cooper; Neville Smith; Malcolm Taylor; Patrick Barr	Repeated also 16 August 1977 on BBC2, 22 November 1980 on BBC2, and 21 July 1988.	Yes (35mm tr?)
8 March 1967	Another Day, Another Dollar	Michael Standing	Lionel Harris	Raymond Menmuir	Victor Maddern; Tony Selby; Michael Standing; Reg Lye; Garfield Morgan; Eric Flynn; Harry Landis		partial
15 March 1967	Public Inquiry	Raymond Williams	Lionel Harris	Gareth Davies	Charles Williams; Edward Evans; Clive Graham; Roderick Jones; Richard Davies; Michael Elwyn		missing
22 March 1967	A Crucial Week in the Life of a Grocer's Assistant	Thomas Murphy	Lionel Harris	James MacTaggart	T. P. McKenna; Elizabeth Begley; Fionnula Flanagan; Dermot Tuohy; Denis McCarthy; David Kelly		missing
29 March 1967	A Breach in the Wall	Ray Lawler	Lionel Harris	Gilchrist Calder	Robert Harris; Barry Justice; John Phillips; Rosemary Leach; Jennifer Daniel; John Bryans; Donald Morley	Repeated 31 July 1968 under Playbill.	missing
5 April 1967	The Voices in the Park	Leon Griffiths	Tony Garnett	John MacKenzie	Kenneth Haigh; George Sewell; Brian Oulton; Paddy Joyce; Will Stampe; Wendy Richard; Alec Ross; Sonnie Willis; Eric Mason		missing
12 April 1967	Dismissal Leading to Lustfulness	Thomas Whyte	Lionel Harris	Rex Tucker	Peter Copley; Petra Davies; Fiona Duncan; Carl Jaffe; John Moffatt; Ronald Radd; Jane Wenham		missing
19 April 1967	A Brilliant Future Behind Him	Thomas Clarke	Lionel Harris	Robert Fleming	David Buck; John Phillips; Isobel Black; James Bree; Patricia Garwood; Robert Harris; Guy Middleton; Ann Tirard; Stephen Jack; Philip Latham; Richard Carpenter; Frank Gatliff; Yvonne Antrobus; Barry Humphries		Yes (35mm tr?)
3 May 1967	Message for Posterity	Dennis Potter	Lionel Harris	Gareth Davies	Patrick Magee; Joseph O'Conor; Geoffrey Chater; Donald Hewlett; Peter Welch; John Golightly		missing
10 May 1967	A Way with the Ladies	Simon Gray. Based on the novel A Helping Hand by Celia Dale.	Lionel Harris	John Glenister	Bill Fraser; Barbara Couper; Amy Dalby		missing
17 May 1967	The Playground	Hunter Davies	Lionel Harris	John Robins	John Ronane; Ann Lynn; Wendy Gifford; Roy Purcell; Jim McManus		missing
24 May 1967	Drums Along the Avon	Charles Wood	Tony Garnett	James MacTaggart	Leonard Rossiter; Valerie Newman; Maureen O'Reilly; Salmaan Peer; Derek Ware		Yes (16mm print)
11 October 1967	Sleeping Dog	Simon Gray	Graeme McDonald	Waris Hussein	Marius Goring; Rachel Kempson; Johnny Sekka		missing
18 October 1967	Wanted: Single Gentleman…	James Broom Lynne	Irene Shubik	John Gorrie	Peter Jeffrey; John Stratton; Alan Rowe; Eileen Atkins		missing
25 October 1967	A Black Candle for Mrs Gogarty	Edward Boyd	Pharic MacLaren		Duncan MacRae; John Grieve; Phil McCall; Peggy Marshall	From BBC Scotland	missing
8 November 1967	The Devil a Monk Would Be	Peter Luke Based on a story by Alphonse Daudet.	Lionel Harris	Waris Hussein	Max Adrian; Tony Selby; Elizabeth Begley; Derek Francis; Bernard Archard; Roger Hammond; John Sharp		missing
15 November 1967	Fall of the Goat	Fay Weldon	Graeme McDonald	Gilchrist Calder	Joss Ackland; Patricia Lawrence; John Stratton; Christine Hargreaves; Sheila Burrell; Joan Sanderson; Arthur Hewlett		missing
22 November 1967	The Profile of a Gentleman	Jimmy O'Connor	Graeme McDonald	John MacKenzie	Lee Montague; George Sewell; Ken Jones; Paddy Joyce; Richard Shaw; Eric Mason; Michael Goldie		partial
29 November 1967	Dial Rudolph Valentino One One	Ewart Alexander	Graeme McDonald	Gareth Davies	Keith Barron; Roy Dotrice; Nerys Hughes; Alan Lake; John Rees; Richard Davies; Edward Burnham		missing
6 December 1967	Kippers and Curtains	Vickery Turner	Lionel Harris	Alan Gibson	Gwen Ffrangcon-Davies; Angela Baddeley; John Glyn-Jones; Paul Angelis; Stephen Hubay		missing
13 December 1967	Death of a Private	Robert Muller Based on Georg Büchner's Woyzeck.	Irene Shubik	James Ferman	Dudley Sutton; Liam Redmond; John Nettleton; Geraldine Sherman; Harry Fowler; Ralph Watson; Godfrey James; Jack Bligh		Yes (35mm tr)
20 December 1967	An Officer of the Court	Nemone Lethbridge	Tony Garnett	James MacTaggart	Tommy Godfrey; Yootha Joyce; Bryan Pringle; Ronald Radd; Glynn Edwards; Alec Ross; Mona Bruce; Desmond Cullum-Jones; Frank Jarvis; Erik Chitty; Bill Burridge; Joby Blanshard; Steve Peters		Yes (35mm tr?)
27 December 1967	The Fat of the Land	Jack Russell	Graeme McDonald	Toby Robertson	Joan Greenwood; Willoughby Goddard; Roy Holder; Hazel Hughes; Peter Jones; Helen Fraser; Russell Hunter; Yvonne Antrobus		missing
3 January 1968	Toggle	Ian Roberts	Graeme McDonald	Waris Hussein	Alan Badel; Moray Watson; Daphne Heard; Ray Armstrong		missing
10 January 1968	House of Character	David Rudkin	Irene Shubik	Alan Cooke	Alfred Lynch; Shelagh Fraser; John Collin; Rex Garner; Elroy Josephs; Brian Badcoe; Sylvia Coleridge		Yes (35mm tr)
17 January 1968	Jamie, on a Flying Visit	Michael Frayn	Graeme McDonald	Claude Whatham	Anton Rodgers; Caroline Mortimer; Dinsdale Landen; Felicity Gibson; Norman Mitchell; Reg Whitehead; Jane Enshawe; John Scott Martin	Repeated 7 August 1968 under Playbill.	missing
24 January 1968	Monsieur Barnett	Jean Anouilh	Lionel Harris	Donald McWhinnie	Michael Redgrave; Miriam Karlin; Harold Lang		missing
31 January 1968	The Drummer and the Bloke	Rhys Adrian	Irene Shubik	Herbert Wise	Peter Sallis; Peter Vaughan; Donal Donnelly; Michael Robbins; John Dearth		missing
7 February 1968	Rebel in the Grave	Marc Brandel	Lionel Harris	Raymond Menmuir	Grégoire Aslan; Michael York		missing
21 February 1968	Coincidence	Piers Paul Read	Graeme McDonald	Moira Armstrong	Clive Revill; Caroline Blakiston; Donald Douglas; Emrys James; John Franklyn-Robbins; John Savident; Llewellyn Rees; Bella Emberg; Roger Avon; Michael Sheard; Desmond Cullum-Jones; Michael Mulcaster		missing
3 April 1968	Light Blue	Gerald Vaughan-Hughes	Graeme McDonald	Alan Cooke	Calvin Lockhart; Maureen O'Brien; Robert Gillespie		missing
10 April 1968	Let's Murder Vivaldi	David Mercer	Graeme McDonald	Alan Bridges	Denholm Elliott; Gwen Watford; Glenda Jackson; David Sumner	Repeated also 7 July 1988.	Yes
17 April 1968	The Golden Vision	Neville Smith and Gordon Honeycombe	Tony Garnett	Kenneth Loach	Ken Jones; Bill Dean; Neville Smith; Joey Kaye		Yes (35mm tr?)
1 May 1968	The Man Behind You	Jeremy Scott	Irene Shubik	Moira Armstrong	Michael Bryant; Tony Steedman; Alan Tucker; Stephen Whittaker		missing
8 May 1968	Infidelity Took Place	John Mortimer	Irene Shubik	Michael Hayes	Judy Cornwell; Paul Daneman; John Nettleton; Patrick Newell		missing
21 August 1968	Mrs Lawrence Will Look After It	Tony Parker	Irene Shubik	John MacKenzie	Mary Miller; Ray Smith; Barry Jackson; James Appleby; Ray Barron; Pauline Collins; Griffith Davies; Gilly Fraser; Sheila Grant; Ben Howard; Frank Jarvis; Eric Mason; Royston Tickner		Yes (35mm tr?)
28 August 1968	Spoiled	Simon Gray	Graeme McDonald	Waris Hussein	Michael Craig; Elizabeth Shepherd; Simon Ward; Mark Rose		missing
4 September 1968	The Gorge	Peter Nichols	Tony Garnett	Christopher Morahan	Billy Hamon; Constance Chapman; Reg Lye; Neil Wilson; John Woodnutt; David Webb	Repeated also 8 September 1976 on BBC2, 28 July 1993 on BBC2.	Yes (35mm tr?)
11 September 1968	A Night with Mrs Da Tanka	William Trevor	Irene Shubik	John Gorrie	Jean Kent; Geoffrey Bayldon; Arthur Lowe; Peter Bathurst; Daphne Heard; John Savident; Reginald Barratt; Christopher Burgess; Barry Andrews		missing
18 September 1968	Charlie	Alun Owen	Irene Shubik	Michael Hayes	Barrie Ingham; Julian Glover; Mary Chester		missing
25 September 1968	Anyone for Tennis?	J. B. Priestley	Graeme McDonald	Claude Whatham	Clifford Evans; Rachel Kempson; Joseph O'Conor; Ernest Clark; Michael Pennington; Angharad Rees		missing
2 October 1968	Mooney and his Caravans	Peter Terson	Irene Shubik	James Ferman	John Alderton; Diana Bishop; Dave Prowse; Jerry Holmes		missing
9 October 1968	The Lower Largo Sequence	Edward Boyd	Pharic MacLaren		Patrick Allen; Isobel Black	From BBC Scotland	missing
16 October 1968	Hello, Good Evening, and Welcome	Hugh Whitemore	Graeme McDonald	Claude Whatham	Robert Hardy; Michael Robbins; James Marcus; Roshan Seth; George Roubicek; Ralph Bates; Dallas Cavell		missing
30 October 1968	A Bit of Crucifixion, Father	Julia Jones	Graeme McDonald	Geoffrey Nethercott	Walter Fitzgerald; Valerie White; Margery Mason; Alan Lake; P.G. Stephens		missing
6 November 1968	Nothing will be the Same Again	James Hanley	Irene Shubik	Peter Hammond	Patrick Magee; Bernard Lee; Gwen Cherrell; Tessa Wyatt		missing
20 November 1968	A Beast with Two Backs	Dennis Potter	Graeme McDonald	Lionel Harris	Patrick Barr; Denis Carey; Christian Rodska; Basil Henson; Madeleine Newbury; Geraldine Newman; Llewellyn Rees		Yes (16mm print)
27 November 1968	On the Eve of Publication	David Mercer	Graeme McDonald	Alan Bridges	Leo McKern; Thorley Walters; Michele Dotrice; Kay Dotrice	Repeated also 6 December 1980 on BBC2, on 30 June 1988, and on 19&20-10-2002 on BBC4.	Yes (35mm tr)
8 January 1969	The Fabulous Frump	James Gibbins	Irene Shubik	Peter Hammond	Sheila Steafel; Peter Butterworth; Donald Churchill; Patsy Rowlands; Richard Stilgoe		missing
15 January 1969	Smoke Screen	Fay Weldon	Graeme McDonald	Donald McWhinnie	Lally Bowers; Stephanie Bidmead; Gemma Jones; Edwin Richfield; Jonathan Newth; Ian Lavender; Geoffrey Cheshire		missing
22 January 1969	Dr Aitkinson's Daughter	Hugo Charteris	Graeme McDonald	Gilchrist Calder	Raymond Huntley; Peter Barkworth; Fanny Rowe; Jennifer Hilary; Sylvia Coleridge; David Langton; Helen Lindsay; Neil Wilson; Reginald Barratt		missing
29 January 1969	The Apprentices	Peter Terson	Graeme McDonald	James Ferman	James Gibson; Barrie Rutter; Allan Swift; Paula Wilcox; Russell Dixon; Gareth Thomas; Loftus Burton; Peter Turner	The National Youth Theatre production of The Apprentices	missing
12 February 1969	Birthday	Michael Frayn	Graeme McDonald	Claude Whatham	Rosemary Leach; Angela Pleasence; Clive Swift; Georgina Ward; Roshan Seth; Tariq Yunus		missing
19 February 1969	The Big Flame	Jim Allen	Tony Garnett	Kenneth Loach	Norman Rossington; Godfrey Quigley; Ken Jones; Griffith Davies; Neville Smith; Michael Lynch; Paddy Joyce		Yes (35mm tr?)
26 February 1969	A Serpent in Putney	Fred Watson	Graeme McDonald	Geoffrey Nethercott	Tony Britton; Angela Browne; Frances White; John Alderton; Barry Stanton		missing
5 March 1969	Bam! Pow! Zapp!	Nigel Kneale	Graeme McDonald	William Slater	Clive Revill; Pauline Delany; Robert Powell; Jeremy Ranchev; Robert James		missing
2 April 1969	Sling Your Hook	Roy Minton	Irene Shubik	Michael Tuchner	Michael Bates; Joe Gladwin; Kenneth Cranham; Barry Jackson; Warren Clarke; Patrick O'Connell; Jo Rowbottom; George Layton; Johnnie Wade; Norman Jones; Neville Smith; Colin Spaull; Andrew McCulloch; Derek Keller		Yes (35mm tr)
9 April 1969	A Child and A Half	Owen Holder	Graeme McDonald	Alan Bridges	Geoffrey Bayldon; Caroline Mortimer; Dinsdale Landen; Rhoda Lewis		missing
16 April 1969	Son of Man	Dennis Potter	Graeme McDonald	Gareth Davies	Colin Blakely; Robert Hardy; Bernard Hepton; Brian Blessed; Edward Hardwicke; Godfrey Quigley; Gawn Grainger; Godfrey James; Eric Mason; Hugh Futcher; Edmund Bailey; David Cannon; Roy Stewart	Repeated also 28 July 1987, and 23 January 2005 on BBC4.	Yes
23 April 1969	The Exiles	Errol John	Irene Shubik	Herbert Wise	Errol John; Esther Anderson; Michael Griffiths; Lelia Goldoni; Donald Douglas; Ann Tirard; Hugh Morton; Robin Scott		missing
30 April 1969	Blodwen, Home from Rachel's Marriage	David Rudkin	Irene Shubik	Alan Cooke	Ann Beach; Gilbert Wynne; Megs Jenkins; William Squire; Declan Mulholland; Eamonn Boyce; Clive Merrison; Clare Jenkins; Heather Emmanuel		missing
6 August 1969	The Parachute	David Mercer	Tony Garnett	Anthony Page	Alan Badel; Jill Bennett; John Osborne; Isabel Dean; Esmond Knight; Drewe Henley; Barry Jackson; John J. Carney; Norman Jones; Royston Farrell; Stephen Whittaker	Repeat of Play of the Month 21 January 1968. Repeated also 1 September 1976 on BBC2 and 29 November 1980 on BBC2, on 23 June 1988.	Yes (35mm tr)
24 September 1969	Pitchi Poi	François Billetdoux English version by Peter Meyer	Michael Bakewell	Roderick Graham	Georges Rouquier; David Spenser; Simon Lack; Hana Maria Pravda	Repeat; originally shown as part of The Largest Theatre in the World project of the EBU, 1 November 1967.	Yes
1 October 1969	The Last Train through the Harecastle Tunnel	Peter Terson	Irene Shubik	Alan Clarke	Richard O'Callaghan; John Le Mesurier; Paul Brooke; Robert Hartley; John Owens; Jonathan Burn; Bill Lyons; Griffith Davies; John Scott Martin; Claire Davenport; Angela Pleasence; Shelagh Fraser; Eileen Way; Toke Townley		Yes (35mm tr)
8 October 1969	Patterson O.K.	Ray Jenkins	Pharic MacLaren		Andrew Robertson; Roddy McMillan; Callum Mill; Virginia Stark	from BBC Scotland	missing
15 October 1969	The Mark-Two Wife	William Trevor	Irene Shubik	Philip Saville	Faith Brook; Gwen Ffrangcon-Davies; Joanna Lumley; Henry Gilbert; Roger Hammond; Alethea Charlton; Philip Madoc; Lillias Walker		Yes
22 October 1969	Close the Coalhouse Door	Alan Plater from a story by Sid Chaplin	Graeme McDonald	Bill Hays	Dudley Foster; Alan Browning; Colin Baker; Bryan Pringle; John Woodvine; Ralph Watson; Kevin Stoney; James Garbutt		missing
29 October 1969	The Sad Decline of Arthur Maybury	John Gorrie	Irene Shubik	John Gorrie	Roland Culver; Lally Bowers; Valerie White; John Ringham; John Savident; Sheila Grant; Harry Littlewood; Sylvia Coleridge; Paul Greenhalgh; Peter Stenson		missing
5 November 1969	All Out for Kangaroo Valley	Noel Robinson	Irene Shubik	Bill Bain	Sandra Gleeson; Mark Edwards; Jennifer Young; Kerry Francis; Peter Arne; Peter Collier; Donald Pickering; Eileen Way		missing
12 November 1969	Happy	Alan Gosling	Irene Shubik	Marc Miller	Malcolm McDowell; Richard Vernon; Brenda Bruce; Leslie Sands; Pauline Collins; Frank Mills; David Ashford		missing
19 November 1969	There Is Also Tomorrow	Hugo Charteris	Graeme McDonald	John MacKenzie	Glyn Houston; Jean Harvey; Ann Penfold; David Burke; Neville Smith; John Nettleton; Kenneth Farrington; Alec Ross	Colour. Repeated as a Play for Today 24 June 1971.	missing
26 November 1969	Double Bill	Johnny Speight	Graeme McDonald	David Myerscough-Jones	Marty Feldman; Eileen Atkins; Joby Blanshard; Diane Aubrey; Donald Gee	Colour. Comprises The Compartment and Playmates. Playmates was repeated as a Play for Today 8 April 1971.	Yes (16mm b&w print)
3 December 1969	Blood of the Lamb	Leon Whiteson	Graeme McDonald	Alan Bridges	Frank Finlay; Nicola Pagett; T.P. McKenna; Anthony Corlan; Donald Morley; Trevor Martin	Colour	missing
10 December 1969	The Vortex	Noël Coward	Graeme McDonald	Philip Dudley	Margaret Leighton; Alan Melville; Patrick Barr; Jennifer Daniel; Barry Justice; Richard Warwick; Felicity Gibson; Nancie Jackson; David McKail	Colour. Adapted from the play.	Yes
17 December 1969	It Wasn't Me	James Hanley	Irene Shubik	James Ferman	Frances Cuka; Ronald Lacey; Derek Francis; Milton Johns	Colour	missing
7 January 1970	The Season of the Witch	Desmond McCarthy and Johnny Byrne	Anne Head	Desmond McCarthy	Julie Driscoll; Paul Nicholas; Robert Powell; Maurice Quick; Fanny Carby; Glynn Edwards; Tony Caunter	Colour. Repeated as a Play for Today 22 April 1971.	Yes
14 January 1970	Mille Miglia	Athol Fugard	Ronald Travers	Robin Midgley	Michael Bryant; Ronald Lacey; Guy Deghy; George Roubicek; Douglas Ditta	Colour. Repeat of 5 August 1968 Theatre 625 on BBC2.	Yes
21 January 1970	The Hunting of Lionel Crane	Roy Minton	Irene Shubik	Michael Tuchner	Robert Powell; Michael Robbins; Geoffrey Hughes; John Barrett; Walter Sparrow; John Rees; Reg Lye; John Comer	Colour	Yes
28 January 1970	Rest in Peace Uncle Fred	Alan Plater	Graeme McDonald	Michael Hayes	Susan Jameson; Corin Redgrave; Jack Watson; Jo Rowbottom	Colour	missing
4 February 1970	Mad Jack	Tom Clarke	Graeme McDonald	Jack Gold	Michael Jayston; Michael Pennington; Clive Swift; David Wood; Donald Sumpter; Ann Beach	Colour. Winner of the first prize and the silver Dore Catholic Prize at the 1971 Monte Carlo International Television Festival. Repeated as a Play for Today 18 March 1971.	Yes
11 February 1970	Nathan and Tabileth	Barry Bermange	Gerald Savory, David Koning	Barry Bermange	Albert van Dalsum; Nell Knoop	Colour (almost entirely in brown and white, with one colour scene). A BBC/NCRV co-production, shot as a silent film then re-dubbed into both English and Dutch.	Yes
18 February 1970	The Italian Table	William Trevor	Irene Shubik	Herbert Wise	Leonard Rossiter; Isabel Dean; Moira Redmond; Ronald Hines	Repeated as a Play for Today 17 June 1971.	missing
25 February 1970	The Boy Who Wanted Peace	George Friel	Pharic MacLaren		Laurance Ruddick; Roddy McMillan; Joseph Brady; Irene Sunters	From BBC Scotland	Yes
4 March 1970	The Cellar and the Almond Tree	David Mercer	Graeme McDonald	Alan Bridges	Celia Johnson; Peter Vaughan; Sydney Tafler; Patsy Byrne; Bernard Kay; Jon Rollason; Godfrey James; Valentino Musetti	Colour. Repeated as a Play for Today 10 June 1971, on BBC2 13 December 1980 and on BBC1 14 July 1988.	Yes
11 March 1970	The Year of the Sex Olympics	Nigel Kneale	Ronald Travers	Michael Elliott	Leonard Rossiter; Suzanne Neve; Tony Vogel; Vickery Turner; Brian Cox; George Murcell; Martin Potter; Patricia Maynard; Derek Fowlds; Wolfe Morris	Colour. Repeat of 29 July 1968 Theatre 625 on BBC2. Repeated again 22 May 2003.	Yes (16mm b&w print)
18 March 1970	No Trams to Lime Street	Alun Owen	Harry Moore	Piers Haggard	Rosemary Nicols; Glyn Owen; Anthony May; Paul Greenwood; Elian Wyn; Artro Morris; Julia Hand; Gerard Hely; George Giles	Colour. Repeated as a Play for Today 11 March 1971.	Yes (16mm b&w print)
25 March 1970	To See How Far It Is: 1: Murphy's Law	Alan Plater	Michael Bakewell	Roderick Graham	Norman Rodway; Nigel Davenport; Philip Bond; John Bryans; Donald Gee; Rhoda Lewis; Arthur Cox; Arnold Ridley	Colour. Repeat of 1 January 1968 Theatre 625 on BBC2.	Yes (16mm b&w print)
1 April 1970	To See How Far It Is: 2: The Curse of the Donkins	Alan Plater	Michael Bakewell	Gilchrist Calder	Nigel Davenport; Norman Rodway; Stephanie Bidmead; Fiona Walker; John Bryans; Jill Melford; Patricia Maynard; Tony Blackburn; Judith Chalmers; Stephen Jack	Colour. Repeat of 8 January 1968 Theatre 625 on BBC2.	Yes (16mm b&w print)
8 April 1970	To See How Far It Is: 3: To See How Far It Is	Alan Plater	Michael Bakewell	Naomi Capon	Nigel Davenport; Norman Rodway; Geoffrey Bayldon; Peter Stephens	Colour. Repeat of 15 January 1968 Theatre 625 on BBC2.	Yes (16mm b&w print)
15 April 1970	Wine of India	Nigel Kneale	Graeme McDonald	Gilchrist Calder	Annette Crosbie; Brian Blessed; John Standing; Rosemary Nicols; Catherine Lacey; Ian Ogilvy; Reg Whitehead	Colour	missing
22 April 1970	Sovereign's Company	Don Shaw	Irene Shubik	Alan Clarke	Roland Culver; Gareth Forwood; James Cosmo; David Rowlands; Raymond Adamson; Norman Mitchell; Moray Watson; John Nettleton	Colour. Repeated as a Play for Today 15 April 1971.	Yes
29 April 1970	Party Games	Hugh Whitemore	Michael Bakewell	Roderick Graham	Frederick Jaeger; Eileen Atkins; Derek Smith; John Nettleton; Nancie Jackson; Roger Mutton; Paul Angelis; Ray Armstrong; Roy Pearce; Joby Blanshard	Colour. Repeat of 11 March 1968 Theatre 625 on BBC2.	missing
13 May 1970	Emma's Time	David Mercer	Graeme McDonald	Alan Bridges	Michele Dotrice; Andrew Keir; Robert Kelvin; Peter Vaughan; Ian Holm; John Sharp; Kay Dotrice	Colour	Yes
20 May 1970	Chariot of Fire	Tony Parker	Irene Shubik	James Ferman	Rosemary Leach; Jimmy Gardner; Charles Tingwell; Stephen Yardley; George Selway; Frank Mills; Michael Turner	Colour. Repeated as a Play for Today 1 July 1971.	Yes
27 May 1970	Wind versus Polygamy	Obi Egbuna	Michael Bakewell	Naomi Capon	Earl Cameron; Gordon Jackson; Charles Hyatt; Clifton Jones; Rudolph Walker; Elroy Josephs	Colour. Repeat of 15 July 1968 Theatre 625 on BBC2. Repeated also 1 April 1971 as a Play for Today.	missing

== The Wednesday Play on DVD ==
- Alice (written by Dennis Potter; directed by Gareth Davies), as an extra on the DVD of Jonathan Miller's 1966 Alice in Wonderland
- Cathy Come Home (written by Jeremy Sandford; directed by Kenneth Loach)
- The End of Arthur's Marriage (written by Christopher Logue; directed by Kenneth Loach)
- In Two Minds (written by David Mercer; directed by Kenneth Loach)
- The Nigel Barton Plays: Stand Up, Nigel Barton and Vote, Vote, Vote for Nigel Barton (written by Dennis Potter; directed by Gareth Davies)
- The Big Flame (written by Jim Allen; directed by Kenneth Loach)
- The War Game (written and directed by Peter Watkins)
- 3 Clear Sundays (written by James O'Connor; directed by Kenneth Loach)
- Up the Junction (written by Nell Dunn; directed by Kenneth Loach)
- The Golden Vision (written by Neville Smith and Gordon Honeycombe; directed by Kenneth Loach)
- The Vortex (written by Noël Coward; directed by Philip Dudley), in the Noël Coward Collection, BBCDVD2566
- The Year of the Sex Olympics (written by Nigel Kneale, directed by Michael Elliott), DVD released by the BFI
- The Last Train through the Harecastle Tunnel (written by Peter Terson, directed by Alan Clarke), in the 'Alan Clarke at the BBC' box set from the BFI.
- Sovereign's Company (written by Don Shaw, directed by Alan Clarke), in the 'Alan Clarke at the BBC' box set from the BFI.

== See also ==
- Armchair Theatre
- ITV Playhouse
- Play for Today
- Play for Tomorrow
- Screen One
- Screen Two
- Theatre 625
- Thirty-Minute Theatre
- Thursday Theatre
