= John Lethbridge (disambiguation) =

John Lethbridge invented the first underwater diving machine.

John Lethbridge may also refer to:

- John Giles Lethbridge (1855–1947), Ontario politician
- John Sydney Lethbridge (1897–1961), British farmer
- Sir John Lethbridge, 1st Baronet (1746–1815), member of parliament for Minehead
