= Son of Man (The Wednesday Play) =

- The Wednesday Play episode
- Episode no.: Season 8 Episode 25
- Directed by: Gareth Davies
- Written by: Dennis Potter
- Original air date: April 16, 1969

"Son of Man" is a British television play by playwright Dennis Potter which was first broadcast on BBC1 on 16 April 1969, in The Wednesday Play slot. An alternative depiction of the last days of Jesus, Son of Man was directed by Gareth Davies and starred Northern Irish actor Colin Blakely. The play was shot on videotape over three days on a very limited budget: Potter was later to say that the set "looks as though it's trembling and about to fall down."

== Controversy ==
The treatment of the subject matter led to Potter's being accused of blasphemy by Christian morality campaigner Mary Whitehouse. Blakely's burly, disheveled Jesus was depicted as being tormented by seizures and self-doubt, repeatedly crying out, "Is it me?", as he struggles with his own nature as God incarnate whilst being vulnerable to human frailty. Potter's work focuses on Jesus's message of universal love, but eschews any mention of miracles or the resurrection. Potter's Jesus believes that people should try to love their enemies rather than fight all the time, but is racked by self-doubt as to whether or not he is the popularly-anticipated Messiah. In one of the play's most oft-cited moments, Jesus examines an upright cross recently used for crucifixion, admires the quality of its timber, and sighs, "You should have stayed a tree, and I should have stayed a carpenter." The character of Judas Iscariot is identified with the rich young man of the synoptic gospels and Pontius Pilate is depicted as a callous and wily political manipulator who recognises the danger of Jesus' teachings upsetting the Roman status quo; Pilate therefore means to have Jesus executed whilst appearing outwardly reluctant to give the order, leaving the Jewish Sanhedrin the blame. The Jewish high priest Caiaphas is depicted as caught between appeasement of the Roman occupiers and the satisfaction of a Messiah-hungry Jerusalem; both Pilate and Caiaphas show moments of doubt when they condemn Jesus. The play fades to black upon the death of Jesus on the cross.

== Cast ==
- Colin Blakely as Jesus
- Robert Hardy as Pontius Pilate
- Bernard Hepton as Caiaphas
- Brian Blessed as Peter
- Edward Hardwicke as Judas Iscariot
- Godfrey Quigley as the Roman Commander
- Patricia Lawrence as Procla
- Gawn Grainger as Andrew
- Clive Graham as Roman Centurion
- Godfrey James as 1st Soldier
- Eric Mason as 2nd Soldier
- Brian Spink as Zealot
- Hugh Futcher as 1st Heckler
- Raymond Witch as 2nd Heckler
- Robin Chadwick as Young Officer
- Colin Rix as James
- Walter Hall as Philip
- Wendy Allnutt as Ruth
- Keith Campbell as 1st Priest
- Edmund Bennett as 2nd Priest
- Allan Lawrance as Money Changed
- Paul Prescott as Man in Crowd
- George Desmond as Leper
- Polly Murch as Woman Possessed
- Peter Beton as Beaten Samaritan
- Edmund Bailey as 3rd Heckler
- David Cannon as Beggar
- Roy Stewart and Dinny Powell as Boxers

== Crew ==
- Written by Dennis Potter
- Music: Carmel College Choir (Choirmaster: Martin Fogell)
- Lighting: Robert Wright
- Sound: Bryan Forgham
- Costumes: Dinah Collin
- Makeup: Sandra Hurll
- Story Editor: Shaun MacLoughlin
- Designer: Spencer Chapman
- Producer: Graeme MacDonald
- Director: Gareth Davies

== Stage version ==
Potter's play was also adapted for the stage and played at the Roundhouse, London, with Frank Finlay in the leading role. The stage version of Son of Man was first produced on 22 October 1969, at the Phoenix Theatre, Leicester.

=== Phoenix Theatre cast ===
- Frank Finlay as Jesus
- Joseph O'Conor as Pontius Pilate
- Ian Mullins as Caiaphas
- David Daker as Peter
- David Henry as the Roman Commander
- Linda Polan as Procla
- Stanley Lebor as Andrew
- Wendy Allnutt as Ruth

== Legacy ==
"Son of Man" co-stars Colin Blakely and Robert Hardy would both portray the eccentric Siegfried Farnon from the James Herriot books; Blakely in the 1975 film It Shouldn't Happen to a Vet and Hardy in the 1978-1990 television series All Creatures Great and Small.

Colin Blakely would appear in another televised dramatisation of the life and death of Jesus Christ; he played Caiaphas in the 1980 American television film The Day Christ Died (in which the role of Jesus was played by Chris Sarandon).

Interviewed by The Guardian in 2020, Irish actor Ciarán Hinds listed the 1969 broadcast of Son of Man as one of his "teenage obsessions":

I was 16 in 1969. On Wednesdays, they used to put on a play and make it work for television. Not like you would see in the theatre. I always remember this remarkable piece by Dennis Potter, the most extraordinary interpretation of Jesus Christ I’ve ever seen and probably ever will. Christ was played by this brilliant Northern Irish actor, Colin Blakely. Instead of playing Christ as a beatific, holy, gentle person, he played him as a raging, furious, sweaty human being with doubts and fears. He really believed that he was just a carpenter and a man of the earth. I remember thinking that it felt so dangerous. We had been brought up to believe that Christ had evolved from God and that he was the son of God. Potter alluding to him as a human being meant suddenly there were all these new ideas to believe in. It was really wonderful and exhilarating.

"Son of Man" has been repeated on television but, to date, has never received an official release on any physical home entertainment format.
