= Nemone Lethbridge =

British barrister and playwright

- Born: 1932 (age 93–94)
- Education: Somerville College, Oxford
- Occupations: Barrister, playwright
- Spouse: Jimmy O'Connor (m. 1959, divorced 1973)
- Children: Ragnar O'Connor (born 1970); Milo O'Connor (born 1972)
- Parents: John Sydney Lethbridge (father); Katharine Greville Maynard (mother)

Nemone Lethbridge (born 1932) is a British barrister and playwright. She is one of Britain's first female barristers.

== Early life and education ==
Lethbridge was born in Quetta (pre-partition India, now Pakistan) in 1932. She was the daughter of John Sydney Lethbridge, an India-born British Army officer, and his wife Katharine Greville Maynard, who was also India-born. At nine years old, Lethbridge boarded at Sacred Heart Convent School in Chew Magna, Somerset. Afterwards she attended Tudor Hall School, Banbury.

She read law at Somerville College, Oxford, from 1952. She was one of only two women studying Law at that time. She had a tutor from Keble College, as Somerville did not have a tutor in Law. Lethbridge intended to go into politics, but got pupillage from Mervyn Griffith-Jones. This was achieved through a contact of her father, at that time Chief of Intelligence for the British Army of the Rhine, who had a connection with David Maxwell Fyfe, 1st Earl of Kilmuir, one of the prosecutors at the Nuremberg trials.

Later in her training she was placed at 3 Pump Court, alongside Rose Heilbron. Lethbridge’s pupilmaster was Norman Broderick.

== Career ==
Lethbridge was called to the Bar at Gray's Inn in 1956. In 1957, she was taken on as a tenant at 3 Hare Court. She was the first woman at Hare Court, where she was barred from using the facilities. She later represented the Kray twins in court.

She met her husband Jimmy O'Connor at the Star Tavern, Belgravia. He had been arrested in 1942 for the murder of George Ambridge. O’Connor was convicted and sentenced to be hanged. After an intervention from one of the police officers, the Home Secretary, Herbert Morrison, commuted the death sentence and O’Connor served 11 years of a life sentence. Lethbridge and O’Connor married in secret in Ireland in 1959. When this was known to the public in 1962, she was no longer accepted as a member of chambers.

Although the evidence against O'Connor was in grave doubt, in 1970 the courts denied O'Connor a full pardon. With his earnings as an author, as well as a few well-received tele-plays by Lethbridge, the couple bought a villa on the isle of Mykonos, spending time with socialites including Aristotle and Jackie Onassis. Lethbridge was known for her work on The Wednesday Play and Pride and Prejudice. In 1971, Lethbridge returned to London seeking a restraining order against O'Connor. They divorced in 1973.

In the early 1980s, she wrote two episodes of the Granada Television series Lady Killers. In 1981, Lethbridge was invited to join the chambers of Louis de Pinna on Chancery Lane.

In 1994, O'Connor was given access to a small selection of files from his 1942 trial. One memo suggested that the actual killer was the same man who O'Connor claimed had confessed in 1968. When the government started its assault on public funding in 1995, she set up Our Lady of Good Counsel Law Centre in Stoke Newington.

Lethbridge’s story was featured in the First 100 Years project, set up to celebrate the centenary of women being able to join the legal profession in the UK and Ireland as a result of Parliament passing the Sex Disqualification (Removal) Act in 1919. In 2 Hare Court, a pair of white silk gloves was carried to the swearing-in ceremony of 2019 to mark the centenary of women being allowed to enter the legal profession. The gloves pay tribute to Lethbridge.

Lethbridge published her autobiography in May 2021 - Nemone: A young woman barrister’s battle against prejudice, class and misogyny. Her controversial marriage.

In December 2021, Lethbridge released her second book, Postcards from Greece, a collection of her poems which are intended to be read alongside the first part of her autobiography Nemone.

Nemone appeared on BBC Radio 4 Desert Island Discs on Sunday 2 February 2025. Her luxury item was her doll, Sarah Jane, which Nemone has had since she was one year old. Her favourite record choice was Mozart's Marriage of Figaro final duet. She did the interview from home after a recent fall. She still works pro bono, giving legal advice. She has stated that she would still value her deceased ex-husband being pardoned, as she always believed he was innocent of murder.
