= First 100 Years =

UK campaign

First 100 Years is a campaign owned and managed by Spark21, a charity registered in England and Wales, set up to celebrate the centenary of women being able to join the legal profession in the United Kingdom and Ireland as a result of Parliament passing the Sex Disqualification (Removal) Act in 1919.

The campaign was initiated by Obelisk Legal Support Solutions, in partnership with The Law Society and the Bar Council but has since received the support of all other professional organisations from the Law Society of Scotland, Chartered Institute of Legal Executives and the Solicitors Regulation Authority, the four Inns of Court. The First 100 Years is a five-year project which seeks to discover the untold stories of pioneering and inspiring women in the legal profession to create a strong and equal future for all those in the legal profession. The project was officially launched in March 2015 and runs to 2020, marking the 100-year anniversary of the Sex Disqualification (Removal) Act 1919 and culminating in the donation of the original material collected and created by the project over its lifetime to the LSE Women's Library in 2020. The project has been the public focal point of the centenary celebrations.

== Background ==
Dana Denis-Smith, CEO and founder of Obelisk Legal Support Solutions, came up with the idea for the project after seeing a particular photograph depicting a lone woman partner standing among male partners in a top law firm. The project was started on International Women’s Day in 2014 and launched officially on 12 March 2015 at House of Lords. Launching the project, Denis-Smith said, “People don’t know their history — who the first woman solicitor was, for instance. There is no archive like the First 100 Years to help us place ourselves in history.”

== About ==
The campaign initially started as a video project documenting the lives of leading women in law of the last century. Since, it has developed more multimedia work, with its book due to be released in November 2019.

Videos

Running until 2020, the project commissioned almost 100 documentary interviews with past and present leading women in the legal profession including. The interviews have been released throughout the life of the project to help it inform and inspired the legal profession of the contribution of women. All the films are free to the public to watch.

Some of the films released to date are those of the following legal personalities:

Baroness Brenda Hale

Mary Arden, Lady Arden

Baroness Helena Kennedy

Cherie Booth QC

Dame Linda Dobbs

Dame Rosalyn Higgins

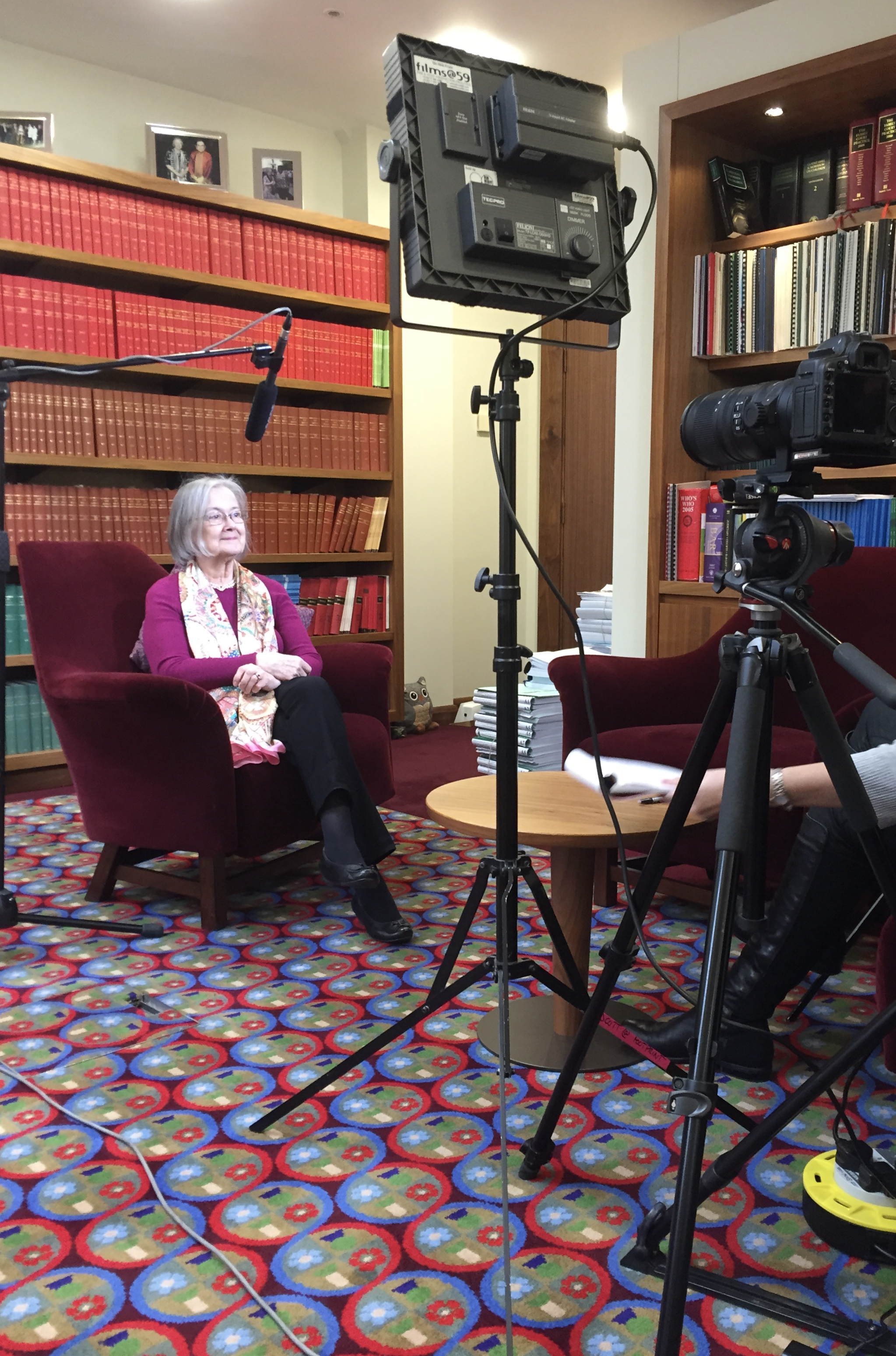
Baroness Hale taking part in the First 100 Years interview for the documentary film of her life and work. Supreme Court, 25 February 2016.

Major General Susan Ridge

Sandie Okoro

The project has been gathering statements and create biographies which depict the journey of women in the law since 1919, with the aim of creating the first digital museum dedicated to the history of women in law. The project aims to create a positive account of the history of women in law, in contrast to the ‘negative narrative of the diversity debate’, and to ‘celebrate the past and change the future of the profession’.

Exhibition

In September 2018, the University of Oxford, Faculty of Law, hosted a decade-by-decade exhibition curated by the project as a print and display touring exhibition. Since then, the exhibition has been touring the UK in various locations to the UK Supreme Court, the Royal Courts of Justice to the University of Leeds, University of Worcester or Winchester's Great Hall Podcasts

In January 2019, First 100 Years launched a series of 10 podcasts, one per month, following the course of the 100 years of women in law in a decade by decade format.

In collaboration with Goldman Sachs and Linklaters, this series of ten podcasts charts the history of women in the legal professions. Progressing decade-by-decade, the podcasts are 45-minute discussions between legal pioneers, historians, academics and legal practitioners based on key themes, including gender stereotypes, the work/life balance and diversity.

"Removing the statutory barrier was just the start: as the podcasts illustrate, women continued to face non-legislative barriers, such as the entrenched sexism and male dominance of the profession, its often trivial objections to women entrants, and the uphill struggle of balancing family life with a career. For example, Nemone Lethbridge, who appears in The Fourth Decade: 1949 – 1959, was the first woman to get tenancy at 3 Hare Court, where she was barred from using from the lavatory: a lock had been installed on the lavatory and each male member given a key, and she was told to use the public toilets in the Kardomah coffee house in Fleet Street."

The podcast series is presented by Lucinda Acland. Lucinda has been a volunteer for First 100 Years since November 2015 and is a qualified lawyer. She has experience of recording voice programmes with the First 100 Years project, at the University of Law and at Obelisk Support.

All episodes are free to access.

Book Marking the centenary of the 1919 Sex Disqualification (Removal) Act, First: 100 Years of Women in Law (Scala Arts & Heritage publishers) tells the story of women in law in their first 100 years of practice. The book is available after 3 November 2019. From early campaigners through to the first women solicitors, barristers, magistrates and judges, the book tells the often untold stories of the pioneers, reformers and influencers who paved the way, revealing the barriers they faced, their challenges and triumphs. It offers a unique insight into how women have made their way in a profession still dominated by men and looks ahead to the prospects for women in law in the next 100 years. The book is co-authored by Lucinda Acland and Katie Broomfield with First 100 Years.

“First 100 Years of Women in Law is a fascinating, beautiful, inspirational and, above all, important portrait of the first century of female empowerment in the legal system. Charting through photographs and historical artefacts the milestones since the Sex Disqualification (Removal) Act 1919 put the first cracks in the glass ceiling of the legal profession, this book offers not only a unique celebration of the progress achieved by women in the law, but a vital reminder of how much work there still is to do.” – The Secret Barrister

“A fascinating and indispensable insight into the female pioneers of the legal profession.” – Caroline Criado-Perez

== See also ==
- First 100 Years Timeline
- First 100 Years Videos
