= Obelisk Legal Support Solutions =

Obelisk Legal Support Solutions, usually known as Obelisk Support, is an alternative legal service provider of more than 1300 lawyers in London.

Obelisk Support uses a flexible 'outsourcing' working model where lawyers work remotely for the client, either on stand-by or as supporting legal advisers. Lawyers are placed with City law firms or in-house on an interim basis, and work as an extension within a business. Obelisk Support uses former city solicitors, many of them women who may enjoy a more flexible schedule (e.g. to raise a family). Obelisk Support also provides a language facility which uses qualified lawyers to translate legal documents into 27 world languages.

== History and development ==
Lucy Scott-Moncrieff, (former president of The Law Society and the current House of Lords Commissioner for Standards), noted the exodus of women solicitors leaving the profession to have children and argued that the situation will only change if the legal sector invests in targeted career development support for women.

Obelisk Support was founded by Dana Denis-Smith in 2010 to aid both women and men, who take time out of law to have a family. The company was founded on the idea of flexible work in law.

The name of the company was inspired by Cleopatra's Needle in London.

Paul Owers, a partner at private-equity firm Actis and an Obelisk client, documents Obelisk Support’s ethical mission of providing flexible working solutions to professional women and men who take time off work for personal and family reasons. He notes, however, that there is a challenge in promoting the model from a business perspective, given the legal sector’s traditionally conservative approach to innovation in the market.

In 2014, Obelisk Support recorded a revenue growth of 400%. In March 2017, Obelisk Support signed a deal with Linklaters to use its pool of flexible lawyers to provide an additional staffing resource.

Obelisk Support provides legal support to 35 FTSE 100 companies, including Barclays, BT, Deutsche Bank, Goldman Sachs, ING, Intel and Vodafone.

== Awards ==
- In 2019, Obelisk Support's founder Dana Denis-Smith was recognized for Outstanding Achievements in Legal Services by the Legal500. Obelisk Support was shortlisted at The Lawyer Awards in the Excellence in Diversity & Inclusion category.
- In 2018, Obelisk Support's founder Dana Denis-Smith was voted LexisNexis Legal Personality of the Year 2018. Obelisk Support was named as one of Europe’s fastest growing companies by the Financial Times and was listed in the FT1000 list of Europe’s fastest-growing companies as well as Inc.com's Inc. 5000 List of Fastest-Growing European Private Companies in 2018.
- In 2017, Obelisk Support's founder Dana Denis-Smith won the WEConnect International Best Mentor and Role Model Award.
- In 2016, Obelisk Support won Legal Week's Innovation Awards Marketing Innovation for its project The Attic.
- In 2015, Obelisk was chosen by The Times' as one of the top 50 employers for women. Denis-Smith also won LegalWeek’s Outstanding Legal Innovator.
- In 2014, Obelisk Support won the Best Strategic Leadership Award at the MPF Awards 2014. It was also a finalist (for the second year) for Best Emerging Firm.
- In 2014, the firm was named runner up to Unilever for "Most Agile Organisation" at the Opportunity Now Awards.
- Obelisk Support was one of three firms to be rated as a stand out in the Legal Pioneers category at the Financial Times Innovative Lawyers Awards 2013.
- In 2012, Denis-Smith was a finalist for "Legal Innovator of the Year" in the FT Innovative Lawyers Awards.
- Denis-Smith was named as one of UK Management Today’s 35 inspirational Women in Business under age 35 in 2010.

== Recognition ==
In 2018, Dana Denis-Smith spoke on the 100 years of the women's suffrage at Hay Festival and was instrumental in erecting the first statue of a woman, Millicent Fawcett, on Parliament Square. She was awarded an honorary Doctorate in Law by the University of Worcester for Obelisk Support's ground-breaking work on alternative models of working for women and for her inspirational commitment to championing women in the legal profession through the First 100 Year’s project.

In 2017, Obelisk Support was the only legal business selected to join London Mayor Sadiq Khan’s two-day trade mission to France.

On 10 June 2017, Denis-Smith delivered a TEDx talk on the topic of How to be remembered at TEDx Royal Turnbridge Wells.

In 2016, Obelisk Support was invited to join Mayor Khan to visit North America and European capitals to emphasise that London was open for business and to showcase some of the fast-growing companies that are part of his International Business Programme.

== First 100 Years Project ==
The First 100 Years project was an initiative launched in 2014 by Obelisk Support in partnership with The Law Society and the Bar Council to capture and celebrate the journey of women in the legal profession over the past 100 years. The project runs for five years and culminates in 2019 to mark the 100th anniversary since the introduction of the Sex Disqualification (Removal) Act 1919.

In the year 2015, the project was launched at the House of Lords.
