= Don Taylor (English director and playwright) =

British director and playwright (1936–2003)

- Born: Donald Victor Taylor; 30 June 1936
- Died: 11 November 2003 (aged 67)
- Occupations: Writer, director, producer

Donald Victor Taylor (30 June 1936 – 11 November 2003) was an English writer, director and producer, active across theatre, radio and television for over forty years. He is most noted for his television work, particularly his early 1960s collaborations with the playwright David Mercer, much of whose early work Taylor directed for the BBC.

== The BBC ==
Born in Marylebone in London, Taylor attended Chiswick Grammar School and subsequently studied English Literature at Pembroke College, Oxford. While at university he became actively involved in student theatre, particularly with the Experimental Theatre Club. It was for the club that Taylor directed, in 1957, the world premiere of Epitaph for George Dillon by the acclaimed playwright John Osborne.

After graduating, he joined the BBC as a general trainee in 1960, quickly becoming a television director in the drama department. His first directing work was an episode of the crime series Scotland Yard, but he rapidly became more associated with directing single plays. His association with David Mercer began in 1961 with Where the Difference Begins, the first instalment in what became the "Generations" trilogy, the subsequent instalments of which – A Climate of Fear (1962) and Birth of a Private Man (1963) – were also directed by Taylor. He also directed Mercer's Sunday Night Play episode A Suitable Case for Treatment (1962), which explored the writer's experiences of his own nervous breakdown.

Taylor was greatly displeased by the arrival in December 1962 of the Canadian producer Sydney Newman as the new Head of Drama at the BBC. He regarded Newman as an uncultured populist with no theatrical knowledge or background; Taylor himself felt that the BBC should be the "National Theatre of the Air". He also disliked Newman's restructuring of the drama department, one of the features of which was the abolition of the BBC's traditional single producer/director role and the division of responsibilities of producing and directing to separate posts.

Newman attempted to work with Taylor and offered him the producer's role on a series the Canadian himself had initiated – an educational science-fiction serial for children entitled Doctor Who. Taylor had no interest in the series. Taylor remained with the BBC for a time, but was not a staff member and left in 1964 on the expiration of his contract. Although he did return as a freelancer to direct two episodes of The Wednesday Play in 1965 – including a further Mercer play, And Did Those Feet? – he later claimed to have been "blacklisted" from working in the BBC's drama department for the remainder of the decade, and there is a deal of evidence to show that this was the case. Taylor himself quoted Lionel Harris as confirming this to Ellen Dryden in his memoir Days of Vision.

== Later career ==
He was, however, able to find work with other departments of the BBC, directing several episodes of the arts documentary series Omnibus. He also began to find success as a playwright himself, for the theatre, with his first professional play Grounds for Marriage being premiered by the Traverse Theatre in 1967.

From the early 1970s, he also began to work for BBC television drama again directing versions of his own plays The Exorcism in 1972, and The Roses of Eyam the following year.

He also worked in television for the ITV network, including two episodes of Nigel Kneale's ATV anthology horror series Beasts in 1976.

He went on to direct mostly classic theatrical adaptations for the BBC, including The Two Gentlemen of Verona in 1984 for their The Complete Dramatic Works of William Shakespeare series, which adapted all of Shakespeare's plays for the small screen. In 1986 he directed Oedipus Rex (Oedipus the King). His final television work was his own new translation of Iphigenia at Aulis by Euripides in 1990, after which he retired from the medium. That same year he published a memoir of his television work, Days of Vision, in which he was scathing of the state of modern television drama and the disappearance of the theatrical tradition from the medium.

For the remainder of his career, Taylor was particularly active in radio and the theatre. The same year he retired from television work, he and his wife established a radio production company called First Writes, producing plays independently for transmission on BBC Radio. He both wrote and directed for radio himself and worked alongside his wife in running a youth theatre company they had established near their Chiswick home. He wrote several plays for the company, including "Daughters of Venice".

Later in life, the family moved to the village of Banham, near Norwich, in Norfolk, where Taylor died in 2003. He had married the writer Ellen Dryden in 1960 – she and their two children survived him.

Less than a year after his death, Katie Mitchell directed a production of his translation of Iphigenia at Aulis at the Lyttelton, to huge critical acclaim. The "National Theatre of the Air" had not come to pass, but finally his work was played at the National Theatre. This was followed in 2007 by the same director's production of his translation of Women of Troy, and in 2012 by Polly Findlay's production of his 'Antigone', with Christopher Eccleston and Jodie Whittaker.
