= Jimmy O'Connor (author) =

English playwright (1918–2001)

- Born: James O'Connor; 20 May 1918; Paddington, England
- Died: 29 September 2001 (aged 83)
- Occupation: Author

Jimmy O'Connor (20 May 1918 – 29 September 2001) was an English playwright for The Wednesday Play and Play for Today television series on the BBC.

== Early life ==
He was born James O'Connor in Paddington, west London, England in 1918. His father, James O'Connor, was a merchant mariner and fish monger from Ireland; his mother a part-time prostitute. Growing up in the slums of West London, O'Connor learned the trade of petty theft.

Doing the "honorable thing" he married Mary Agnes Davey, four years his senior, in the spring of 1936. She was Church of England, while he was Irish Catholic. Their son, James William O'Connor, was born on 19 September 1936. Mary O'Connor divorced her husband in 1946 after he attempted to have their son removed from her care and raised Catholic.

With the beginning of World War II, O'Connor enlisted and served with the British Expeditionary Forces in France. He was one of the few survivors of the sinking of the ship RMS Lancastria on 17 June 1940, and shared a life raft with Cunard Line Captain Harry Grattidge. After an honorable discharge, he went back to theft and was sentenced to six months in prison in late 1941.

When O'Connor was released in 1952, his son, not eager for a reunion, went to sea and eventually served for a few years on The Queen Mary under Capt. Grattidge. Grattidge later wrote about both O'Connor and his son (under the pseudonym "Terry").

== Murder conviction ==
In January 1942, O'Connor was arrested for the murder of George Ambridge on 14 April 1941. In spite of questionable testimony and poor forensic evidence (O'Connor was in the possession of a pocket watch police claimed belonged to the murdered man), he was found guilty and sentenced to death. Two days before he was to hang which would have been on his birthday O'Connor was given a reprieve. While in Dartmoor Prison, O'Connor entered into a correspondence course through Ruskin College.

== Later life ==
When O'Connor was released from prison in 1952, he became a reporter for the Empire News. Still trying to clear his name with a full pardon, O'Connor met and fell in love with barrister Nemone Lethbridge, who had joined his cause for complete exoneration. They were secretly married in 1959. When their marriage was made public in 1962, with the stigma of O'Connor still being out "At Her Majesty's Pleasure", Lethbridge was forced out of chambers and left unable to practise law.

In 1968, O'Connor and Lethbridge petitioned the courts for a pardon based on new information concerning the pocket watch and the alleged confession to O'Connor by another man. Although the evidence against O'Connor was in doubt, in 1970 the courts denied O'Connor a full pardon. With his earnings as an author, as well as a few well-received television plays by Lethbridge, the couple bought a villa on the isle of Mykonos, spending time with the likes of Aristotle and Jackie Onassis.

O'Connor and Lethbridge's first son, Ragnar O'Connor, was born in 1970. O'Connor was still bitter about the denial of his pardon and drank most his money away, causing Lethbridge to leave him in 1971 and return to London seeking a restraining order. The couple reconciled long enough to have a second son, Milo O'Connor, in 1973, but shortly thereafter they divorced. O'Connor continued to drink heavily, and returned to London.

In 1994, O'Connor was given access to a small selection of files from his 1942 trial. One memo suggested that the actual killer was the same man O'Connor claimed had confessed in 1968. Shortly after the discovery, O'Connor suffered a series of strokes and was placed in a Catholic charity nursing home by Lethbridge, just a few blocks from her home in Stoke Newington.

On 29 September 2001, Jimmy O'Connor died after another series of strokes at the age of 83.

In 2007 Lethbridge (having now been reinstated to chambers) was allowed to bring O'Connor's case once again before the courts.

== Career ==
O'Connor became a playwright with his scripts for The Wednesday Play BBC television series. Released in 1965, Tap on the Shoulder, Three Clear Sundays and The Profile of a Gentleman drew from O'Connor's experiences in prison and the people he grew up with in the West End.

O'Connor continued to write for television and regained some acclaim with the 1973 Play for Today episode "On Her Majesty's Pleasure" which brought critical attention to actor Bob Hoskins. In 1976, O'Connor's autobiography The Eleventh Commandment became a best-seller.
