= David Mercer (playwright) =

English playwright and screenwriter (1928–1980)

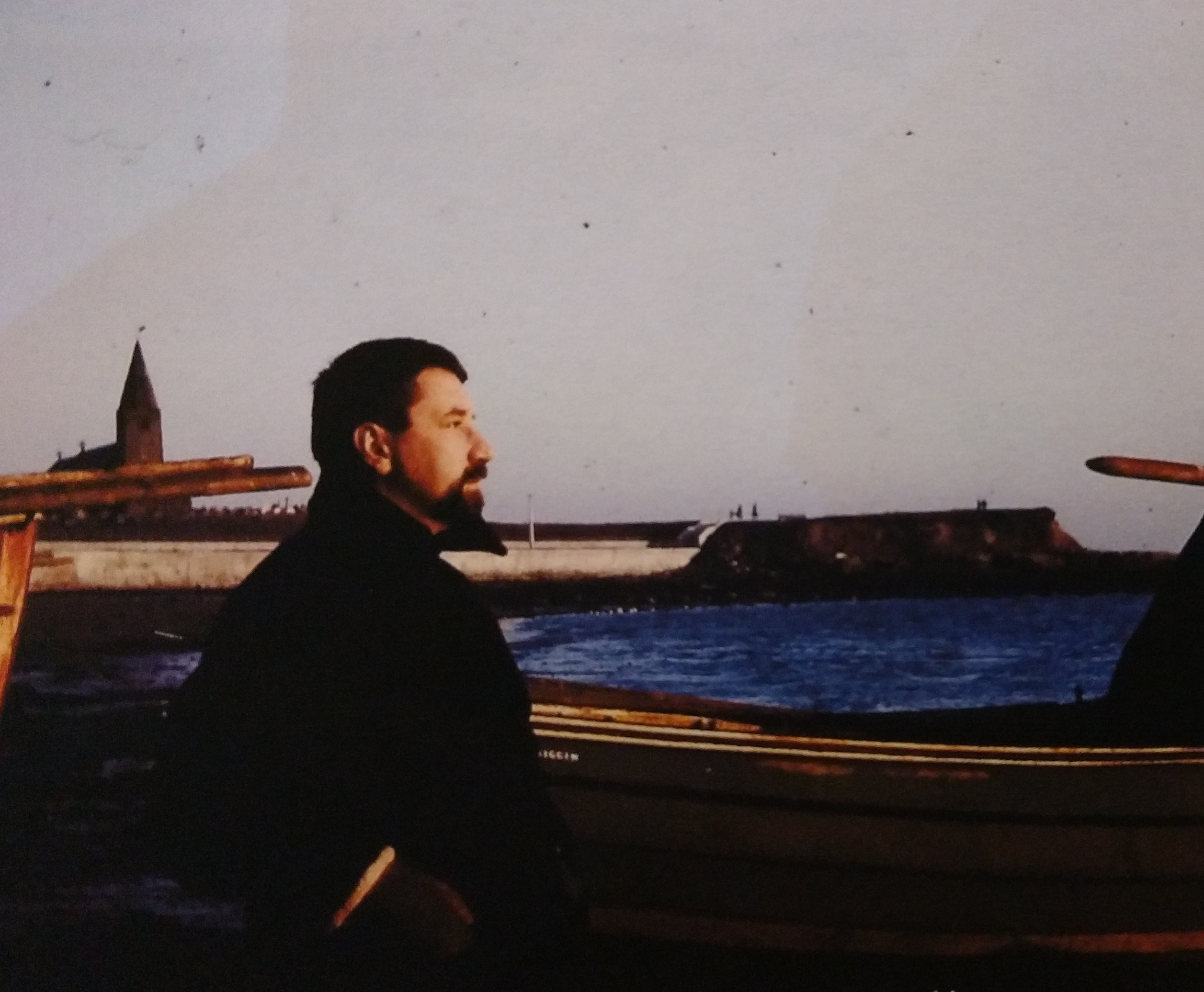
- Mercer c. 1963
- Born: 27 June 1928; Wakefield, Yorkshire, England
- Died: 8 August 1980 (aged 52); Haifa, Israel
- Alma mater: University College, Durham; King's College, Newcastle
- Writing career
- Language: English
- Notable awards: BAFTA Award for Best British Screenplay (1967)

David Mercer (27 June 1928 – 8 August 1980) was an English dramatist.

Born in Wakefield, Yorkshire, he worked as a laboratory technician and in the Merchant Navy before attending university. After studying chemistry, he switched to art but eventually turned to writing. His television work for the BBC was often made in collaboration with director Don Taylor. His first stage play, Ride a Cock Horse, starred Peter O'Toole. The Royal Shakespeare Company premiered many of his works, and Mercer wrote the screenplay for the Alain Resnais film Providence, which won a César Award. A long-term heavy drinker, Mercer died in 1980 after suffering a heart attack in Haifa, Israel.

== Early life ==
Mercer was born on 27 June 1928 in Wakefield, Yorkshire, England. His father was an engine driver and his mother had been a domestic servant. Both of his grandfathers had been miners. After failing to gain entry to the local grammar school, Mercer left school at 14. He then worked as a pathology laboratory technician at a local hospital, before joining the Merchant Navy. In the Merchant Navy, he continued his work as a pathology technician, working on shore and aboard HMS Vanguard. He completed his term in 1948 and was awarded a former serviceman's grant.

After attending courses at Wakefield Technical College, he matriculated at University College, Durham to study chemistry. He eventually grew bored of this and switched to studying art at King's College, Newcastle – which was then part of Durham University. Just after graduation he married Jitke Sigmund, a Czechoslovak refugee who was studying economics at King's. Her father had been killed by the Gestapo. With his wife, he spent a year in Paris living with emigres from Communist regimes, where he attempted to become a painter. On realising he was not cut out to be a painter, he burnt all his canvases and turned to writing instead.

In late 1957, now separated and living with Dilys Johnson (whom he later married), he rented a room in a flat at 10 Compayne Gardens, London NW6, that was rented, in turn, by the poet Jon Silkin from Rudolf Nassauer (a wine merchant, poet, and novelist) and his wife, Bernice Rubens, who was later recipient of the 1970 Booker Prize.

== Writing career ==
Much of Mercer's television work for the BBC was made in collaboration with the director Don Taylor. This dated from the beginning of Mercer's career as a television dramatist with the play trilogy The Generations, an attempt to depict the decline of an idealistic form of socialism over 60 years through the members of three generations of one family. This was composed of Where the Difference Begins (1961), a tale about two brothers, one who has abandoned socialism, while the other is a Labour Party intellectual; A Climate of Fear (1962) a piece in which a scientist in Britain's nuclear programme discovers his children have joined CND; and the non-naturalistic The Birth of a Private Man (1963), an account of the disenchantment with protest of an activist who attempts to match left-wing attitudes with an emerging 'affluent' society. The hero of the last play dies at the Berlin Wall facing a stream of bullets from both east and west.

A Way of Living (1963) is a naturalistic piece that deals with the division between a young fisherman and a girl from a mining family who is about to go to university. Three other television plays from this period – A Suitable Case for Treatment (1962, film adaptation: Morgan, 1966), For Tea on Sunday (1963) and In Two Minds (1967) share a concern with madness or, in the critic John Russell Taylor's words, "social alienation expressed in terms of psychological alienation". In Two Minds, directed by Ken Loach, was remade as the feature film Family Life (1971), again directed by Loach. Morgan won a British Film Academy Award for Best Screenplay.

Mercer's first play to be written for the stage, Ride a Cock Horse, was seen in the West End in a 1965 production starring Peter O'Toole. An early work, the one-act The Governor's Lady, in which an elderly colonial governor gradually turns into a gorilla, was originally written for radio in 1960 but not performed until it was staged by the Royal Shakespeare Company (RSC) in 1965. The RSC later premiered many of Mercer's works, including his next play Belcher's Luck (1966), "a wild tragi-comedy full of Lawrentian symbolism about fertility and impotence". The RSC staged it at the Aldwych Theatre, as they did After Haggerty (1970); the father in the later is an engine driver, like Mercer's own father. The Comedy Flint (1970) was first performed at the Criterion with Michael Hordern in the lead as a parson who believes he could not have survived "without a complete lack of faith", his sermons being "a form of bewildering interior monologue",

Other plays for television broadcast in the 1960s are And Did Those Feet (1965), The Parachute (1968) and Let's Murder Vivaldi (1968) and another trilogy, comprising On the Eve of Publication (1969), The Cellar and the Almond Tree (1970) and Emma's Time (1970). The content of this body of work made John Russell Taylor regard Mercer as the most political of British dramatists of this period. Let's Murder Vivaldi, which originated in the BBC's Wednesday Play series, received a stage production at the King's Head theatre club in 1972.

In 1970, Mercer contributed White Poem – a monologue for a white Rhodesian racialist – to a Sharpeville massacre commemoration.

Mercer wrote the screenplay for the Alain Resnais film Providence (1977), in which John Gielgud portrays an elderly, dying writer. The film won a César Award.

== Private life ==
In 1967, Mercer met a German actress, Maria Machado, with whom he had a brief relationship that later resulted in the birth of his first child.

On 5 November 1974, Mercer married his third wife Dafna and they both welcomed a baby daughter, Rebecca, in July 1975.

Mercer died in August 1980 after suffering a heart attack in Haifa, Israel, where he was on holiday with Dafna and Rebecca.

== As fictional character ==
Mercer is depicted as Malcolm Sloman in the Trevor Griffiths play The Party (1973). In 1982, The Arcata Promise, a stage adaptation of the 1974 television play, was produced by Brockman Seawell and premiered in New York in 1982, starring Brian Murray.

== Works ==
Television

- 1961 Where the Difference Begins (TV Movie, directed by Don Taylor) - First part of the Generations Trilogy
- 1962 A Climate of Fear (TV Movie, directed by Don Taylor) - Second part of the Generations Trilogy
- 1963 The Buried Man (ITV Play of the Week, directed by Graham Evans) (No recording exists)
- 1962 A Suitable Case for Treatment (BBC Sunday Night Play, directed by Don Taylor) (No recording exists)
- 1963 A Suitable Case for Treatment (Playdate) (No recording exists)
- 1963 The Birth of a Private Man (TV Movie) (No recording exists, directed by Don Taylor) - Third and final part of the Generations Trilogy
- 1963 A Way of Living (Armchair Theatre, directed by Alan Cooke)
- 1963 For Tea on Sunday (BBC Sunday Night Play, directed by Don Taylor) (No recording exists)
- 1965 And Did Those Feet (The Wednesday Play, directed by Don Taylor)
- 1967 In Two Minds (The Wednesday Play, directed by Ken Loach)
- 1968 Let's Murder Vivaldi (The Wednesday Play, directed by Alan Bridges)
- 1968 The Parachute (BBC Play of the Month, directed by Anthony Page)
- 1969 On the Eve of Publication (The Wednesday Play, directed by Alan Bridges) - First part of the Robert Kelvin Trilogy
- 1970 The Cellar and the Almond Tree (The Wednesday Play, directed by Alan Bridges) - Second part of the Robert Kelvin Trilogy
- 1970 Emma's Time (The Wednesday Play, directed by Alan Bridges) - Third and final part of the Robert Kelvin Trilogy
- 1972 The Bankrupt (Play For Today, directed by Christopher Morahan)
- 1973 Barbara of the House of Grebe (Wessex Tales, directed by David Hugh Jones)
- 1973 You and Me and Him (Thirty Minute Theatre, directed by Barry Hanson)
- 1973 Afternoon at the Festival (ITV Sunday Night Theatre, directed by Donald McWhinnie)
- 1974 The Arcata Promise (ITV Sunday Night Drama, directed by David Cunliffe)
- 1974 Find Me (Omnibus, directed by Don Taylor)
- 1976 Huggy Bear (TV Movie, directed by David Cunliffe)
- 1977 Shooting the Chandelier (BBC2 Play of the Week, directed by Jane Howell)
- 1977 A Superstition (The Sunday Drama, directed by David Cunliffe)
- 1978 Flint (BBC Play of the Month, directed by Peter Wood)
- 1978 For Tea on Sunday (BBC2 Play of the Week, directed by Don Taylor)
- 1978 The Ragazza (Play For Love)
- 1980 A Rod of Iron (ITV Playhouse, directed by David Cunliffe)
- 1988 A Dinner of Herbs (TV Movie, directed by Michael Darlow)

Film

- 1965 90 Degrees In The Shade (Directed by Jiří Weiss)
- 1966 Morgan: A Suitable Case For Treatment (Directed by Karel Reisz)
- 1971 Family Life (Directed by Ken Loach)
- 1973 A Doll’s House (With Michael Meyer. Directed by Joseph Losey)
- 1977 Providence (Directed by Alain Resnais)

Radio

- 1960 The Governor's Lady
- 1974 Folie à Deux

Theatre

- 1962 The Buried Man (Produced in Manchester)
- 1965 The Governor’s Lady (Royal Shakespeare Company, Aldwych Theatre, London, from his radio play)
- 1965 Ride a Cock Horse (Theatre Royal, Nottingham)
- 1966 Belcher’s Luck (Royal Shakespeare Company, Aldwych Theatre, London)
- 1970 White Poem (Institute of Contemporary Arts, London) - Monologue, staged alongside Black Pieces by Mustapha Matura.
- 1970 Flint (Playhouse, Oxford)
- 1970 After Haggerty (Royal Shakespeare Company, Aldwych Theatre, London)
- 1971 Blood On The Table (London)
- 1972 Let’s Murder Vivaldi (King’s Head Theatre, London) - Theatrical adaptation from his television play
- 1973 In Two Minds (Bush Theatre, London) - Theatrical adaptation from his television play
- 1974 Duck Song (Royal Shakespeare Company, Aldwych Theatre, London)
- 1978 Cousin Vladimir (Royal Shakespeare Company, Aldwych Theatre, London)
- 1978 Shooting the Chandelier (Royal Shakespeare Company, Aldwych Theatre, London) - Theatrical adaptation from his television play
- 1979 Then and Now (Hampstead Theatre, London)
- 1979 The Monster of Karlovy Vary (Hampstead Theatre, London)
- 1980 No Limits to Love (Royal Shakespeare Company, Warehouse, London)
- 1982 The Arcata Promise (No Smoking Playhouse, New York) - Theatrical adaptation from the television play
