= Providence (1977 film) =

- Directed by: Alain Resnais
- Written by: David Mercer
- Produced by: Yves Gasser; Klaus Hellwig; Yves Peyrot
- Starring: Dirk Bogarde; Ellen Burstyn; John Gielgud; David Warner; Elaine Stritch
- Cinematography: Ricardo Aronovich
- Edited by: Albert Jurgenson
- Music by: Miklós Rózsa
- Distributed by: Compagnie Commerciale Française Cinématographique (CCFC); Groupement des Editeurs de Films (GEF)
- Release dates: 25 January 1977 (USA); 9 February 1977 (France)
- Running time: 110 minutes
- Countries: France; Switzerland
- Languages: English; French

Providence is a 1977 French/Swiss film directed by Alain Resnais from a screenplay by David Mercer. It explores the processes of creativity through a portrayal of an ageing novelist, played by John Gielgud, who imagines scenes for his latest novel which draw upon his past and his relationships with members of his family. The film won the 1978 César Award for Best Film.

== Plot summary ==
On the eve of his 78th birthday, the ailing, alcoholic writer Clive Langham spends a painful and sleepless night mentally composing and recomposing scenes for a novel in which characters based on his own family are shaped by his fantasies and memories, alongside his caustic commentary on their behaviour. His son Claude appears as a cold and unforgiving prosecuting lawyer, who revels in spiteful repartee. His second (illegitimate) son Kevin features as an idealistic soldier accused of the mercy-killing of an old man who was being hunted down. Claude's wife Sonia shows sympathy with Kevin and seems eager to seduce him in protest at her husband's callousness. Clive also invents the character of Helen, as Claude's mistress, but she bears the features of Clive's dead wife Molly who committed suicide. Clive's imagination is also haunted by scenes of an autopsy on the corpse of an old man, a military round-up of elderly people who are detained in a sports stadium, and a dark tangled forest in which a hunted man metamorphoses into a werewolf. Before Clive loses consciousness, it is Kevin whom he sees as the werewolf in the forest; Claude shoots Kevin but seems to identify him with their father.

On the following day, Clive welcomes Claude, Sonia and Kevin (in reality an astrophysicist) for an idyllic birthday lunch in the sunlit garden of his country mansion, and their relationships are characterised by mutual affection and good humour, albeit with signs of self-restraint in deference to the occasion. After lunch, in what he seems to envisage as a final parting, Clive unexpectedly asks them all to leave without a word.

== Cast ==
- John Gielgud as Clive Langham. Gielgud described his role as "a very tough, Augustus John kind of character, drunk half the time, lying in bed drinking white wine and throwing bottles about, and roaring a lot of very coarse dialogue."
- Dirk Bogarde as Claude Langham
- Ellen Burstyn as Sonia Langham
- David Warner as Kevin Langham / Kevin Woodford
- Elaine Stritch as Helen Wiener
- Cyril Luckham as Doctor Mark Eddington
- Denis Lawson as Dave Woodford
- Kathryn Leigh Scott as Miss Boon
- Milo Sperber as Mr. Jenner
- Anna Wing as Karen
- Peter Arne as Nils
- Tanya Lopert as Miss Lister

== Production ==
The producer Klaus Hellwig suggested to Resnais that he should make a film with the British playwright David Mercer. The two men met in London and, overcoming the obstacle that neither of them spoke the language of the other fluently, they began a series of discussions of drafts and redraftings which extended over a year. Mercer's original idea concerned the situation of political prisoners held in a sports stadium, symbolising a world in collapse. Gradually the outline shifted to the imagination of an aging writer seeking the material for a novel. Resnais proposed making the whole film into a metaphor of creation and disintegration; he also made extensive alterations to the chronology of the scenes as written by Mercer.

The title of the film was also supplied by the producer, signifying both the name of the estate where the ageing novelist lives and also the controlling hand with which he arranges the fate of his characters. The name evoked further associations with the American city of Providence, the home of the fantasy writer H. P. Lovecraft whose gothic stories inspired some of the imagery in the film.

The original intention was to shoot the film in the United States in New England but for reasons of cost this became impracticable. Certain exterior scenes were filmed in Providence and in Albany in the US, while others were done in Brussels, Antwerp, and Louvain; these were used in conjunction with each other to form a composite cityscape for the background of certain scenes. Studio scenes were filmed in Paris. The final birthday party sequence was shot on location at the château de Montméry at Ambazac near Limoges. Filming took place between April and June 1976.

The set designs were created by Jacques Saulnier, a regular collaborator with Resnais, and he won a César award for his work. In order to create a funereal atmosphere, grey and dark shades predominated in the design and strong colours were excluded. Saulnier recalled that Resnais made him read Lovecraft in order to imbue Langham's house with the presence of death: "I imagined it like a family tomb". In some scenes (created in Clive Langham's imagination) the layout of a set changes between one shot and another (for instance, the door in the corner of a room in one shot appears at the bottom of a flight of stairs in another; a conversation between four characters alone in one scene continues in the midst of a party in the next). Some settings use a painted backdrop which has a deliberately theatrical appearance; one of them portrays a seascape in which artificial waves surge up among the painted rocks (achieved by blowing bursts of polystyrene foam pieces from beneath the set).

Providence was Resnais's first film in English, and a prestigious cast of British and American actors was engaged despite the restrictions on the budget. Resnais held a longstanding ambition to cast John Gielgud in a substantial film role, having seen him performing on stage, and was encouraged to approach him by Dirk Bogarde. Gielgud later described the project as "by far the most exciting film I have ever made", and noted the impressive calmness of Resnais throughout filming which made him "wonderful to work with". He also recalled the contribution made by Florence Malraux, Resnais's wife, who spoke fluent English and helped overcome the director's limitations in that respect. Resnais attached great importance to the interplay of vocal timbres of his principal actors, and he described how he thought of them as a Schubertian quintet: Ellen Burstyn a violin, Dirk Bogarde a piano, David Warner a viola, John Gielgud a cello, and Elaine Stritch a double bass.

The original intention had been to make the film in French, translating it from the English. Resnais however soon felt that it would not work in French: "I could hear it so clearly in English and anyway, Mercer's writing depended on the English inflection." The producers agreed, but insisted that there should also be a French version." The process of dubbing the completed work into French was undertaken with particular care: the voice actors included Claude Dauphin as Clive, François Périer as Claude, Gérard Depardieu as Kevin, Nelly Borgeaud as Sonia, and Suzanne Flon as Helen.

For the music Resnais turned to the Hungarian-born Hollywood composer Miklós Rózsa, whom he had admired especially for his work on the 1949 version of Madame Bovary. Rózsa later cited Resnais as one of the few directors in his experience who really understood the function of music in film. Soundtrack albums were eventually issued on LP and CD.

=== Themes ===
Resnais described the film as a "macabre divertissement", insisting that he wanted it to be funny despite the darkness of its themes. He also said that one of the questions which the film poses is whether we are the people we think we are or whether we become what others make of us in their judgments.

A central theme is the process of artistic creation: "[Providence] is a meta-film, a film about the making of films, a work of art about the fabricating of art works." Expanding this idea: "The film suggests some symbiotic relation between creator and created script.... The characters are [Clive's] creations, yet he speaks to them as if they were wilful children. Their status is ambiguous since they a composite: they are dream figures, created characters and also individuals who are part of Clive's proximate reality."

In counterpoint with creativity, the theme of death recurs constantly, not so much as a subject in itself but in Clive's struggle to avoid it: Resnais described the film as telling the story of the old writer's determination not to die, and his continual drinking and imagining are the evidence of his refusal to let go. As well as the funereal aspects of the decor and the scenes of autopsy, the repeated instances of metamorphosis of a character into a werewolf is linked to the advent of death, with the implication that the process of dying reduces man to animal. Clive also has an obsession that the young are trying to push him aside, to kill him, which he visualises in the scenes of the stadium/concentration camp where the old are rounded up by soldiers who are all young.

Other motifs which contribute to the mood of morbid anxiety are the military search parties and images of deportation, the helicopter surveillance, the sound of bombs and ambulance sirens, and the demolition of buildings.

As several writers about the film have observed, the opening sequence mirrors the beginning of Citizen Kane: the plaque outside the house, the camera closing in on a lighted doorway, the breaking of a glass object, the close-up of the lips of Clive as he curses. Whereas the personality of Kane is explored through the separate 'versions' of people who knew him, in Providence it is the central figure of Clive who draws the characters of the members of his family and gives a reflection of himself through them.

One of the thoughts on his own style of expression that was written for the character of Clive by David Mercer has been noted by many critics as especially applicable to Resnais himself. Citing a criticism of his own creative work that the pursuit of style has often resulted in a lack of feeling, Clive then argues back that "Style is feeling—in its most elegant and economic expression."

== Reception and influence ==
In France the press response to Providence at the time of its release (and again at its re-release in 1983) was overwhelmingly enthusiastic. Many argued that it was a film of great cultural importance, and a highlight in Resnais's career. The film went on to win seven prizes at the César awards, including Best Film and Best Director.

By contrast, reviewers in the United States were predominantly hostile to the film. Vincent Canby in The New York Times called it a "disastrously ill-chosen comedy" and "a lot of fuss and fake feathers about nothing"; he found the script pretentious and the structure complicated without being complex. For John Simon in New York it was an "unmitigated disaster" in which he criticised almost every aspect with the exception of John Gielgud's performance. Pauline Kael wrote a 2000 word review in The New Yorker which found fault with the contradictory structure, the stilted language, the artificiality of the acting, and the glacial directorial style of the film before concluding that all it amounted to was "the pain of a 'clever' English play". A short notice in Variety took a different view, referring to "an unusual visual tour-de-force ... offering dense insights into the flights of imagination of a supposedly dying writer".

In the UK, the film received a more varied reception, and it had a successful box-office run in London. David Robinson writing in The Times was troubled by the quality of the writing: "Resnais's visual creations ... seem very flimsily supported on the frame of David Mercer's script ... the writing, again, is self-conscious, stiffly literary. The dialogue is formal, and artificial ... And the pretensions of the text only increase suspicion that it is not about very much at all." A non-judgmental review in the Monthly Film Bulletin emphasised the many layers of thematic cross-reference both within the film and beyond it, with echoes of other work written by David Mercer and elements from other films as well as the occasional interleaving of European and American landscapes. Gilbert Adair in Sight & Sound contrasted David Mercer's excessively literal script in which "nothing is left unstated" with the extent of the personal mythology and fantasy which Resnais was able to introduce into the film; he found the work enriched by its anti-naturalistic devices such as the gaffes in continuity which emerge in Clive's plotting of his novel and the exchange of voices of the characters, as well as by the disjunctive appearances of a clownish footballer in inappropriate scenes; and despite certain reservations he concluded that "the dream cast perform together superbly". A specific criticism of one aspect of the film appeared in a comment column of the British Medical Journal, where it was argued that the inclusion of scenes of a post-mortem on a corpse (accurate but unsparing) was "undignified and uncivilised and ought to be condemned" because the audience was not prepared for them and they were unnecessary to the plot.

Retrospective evaluations of Providence have generally been more positive than the contemporary ones. In the Oxford History of World Cinema it is described as "a magisterial and deeply moving incursion into the fantasies of a dying man". For the critic Jonathan Rosenbaum, "The superb performances and Miklós Rózsa's sumptuous Hollywood-style score give the film's conceit a moving monumentality and depth, and Resnais' insights into the fiction-making process are mesmerising and beautiful." The artist Tacita Dean cited Providence as her favourite film, saying that "it deals effortlessly with the problems of enacting the fantasies of a writer’s imagination. It mixes places and time within single sequences to create an uncanny sense of dislocation but its brilliance is its leanness – not a single moment of excess."

One of the aspects of the film which has generated most comment and disagreement is the interpretation of the two-part structure and to what extent one of them represents 'deception' and the other 'truth'. For Pauline Kael, the 'imagined' part and the 'real' part contradict each other because either they cannot both be true or else they are not both relevant. Others have found different grounds for criticism, arguing that the final 'real' section represents a compromise and a concession to conventional cinema, a denial of all the bold experimentation of the previous four-fifths of the film. Alain Robbe-Grillet, writer of the screenplay for Resnais's earlier exploration of imagination and recollection, L'Année dernière à Marienbad, was one of those who disapproved of the final section. An alternative view is that the final lyrical section of the birthday party does not present a definitive picture of the family as they really are, but rather another perspective on them in the puzzle which Clive – both as writer and as father – is trying to solve. As one critic has expressed it:

The second part of the film supplements the first by altering its effect, by denying its sometimes hostile paranoid proof but not by eradicating these altogether. The parts of the film open Providence up as a series of reflecting realities which, wound together, may offer something of the hesitance and doubt of mental process. In this sense, Providence may be seen as a precursor to the work of David Lynch in films such as Lost Highway (1997) and Mulholland Drive (2001).

Providence received five top-10 votes (three from critics and two from directors) in the 2012 Sight & Sound polls of the greatest films ever made.

On review aggregator website Rotten Tomatoes, the film holds an approval rating of 73% based on 11 reviews, with an average rating of 8.1/10.

== Awards and nominations ==
- Bodil Awards (Denmark)
  - Won: Best European Film
- César Awards (France)
  - Won: Best Director (Alain Resnais)
  - Won: Best Editing (Albert Jurgenson)
  - Won: Best Film
  - Won: Best Music (Miklós Rózsa)
  - Won: Best Production Design (Jacques Saulnier)
  - Won: Best Sound (René Magnol and Jacques Maumont)
  - Won: Best Screenplay, Dialogue or Adaptation (David Mercer)
  - Nominated: Best Cinematography (Ricardo Aronovich)
- French Syndicate of Cinema Critics (France)
  - Won: Best Film
- New York Film Critics (USA)
  - Won: Best Actor (John Gielgud)
- Valladolid Film Festival (Spain)
  - Won: Golden Spike (Alain Resnais)
