= Simon Clarke (sociologist) =

British sociologist (1946–2022)

- Born: Simon Richard Curtis Clarke; 26 March 1946; London, England
- Died: 27 December 2022 (aged 76)
- Title: Professor of Sociology

Academic background
- Education: The Hall School; Bryanston School; Clare College, Cambridge; University of Essex

Academic work
- Discipline: Sociologist
- Institutions: University of Warwick

Simon Clarke (26 March 1946 – 27 December 2022) was a British sociologist who specialised in social theory, political economy, labour relations, and the history of sociology. He had a particular interest in employment relations in China, Vietnam, and the former-Soviet nations. He was professor emeritus of Sociology at the University of Warwick.

== Life ==
Simon Clarke was born on 26 March 1946 to Tom Clarke, an English screenwriter, and Diana Gordon, a teacher of English as a foreign language. Clarke was born in London and spent his early childhood abroad before attending The Hall School and Bryanston School. He studied economics at Clare College, Cambridge, graduating with a first class degree in 1967. After a year spent teaching economics in the Department of Political Economy at University College London, Clarke began studying for a PhD at the University of Essex under the supervision of Alasdair MacIntyre; his thesis was entitled The Structuralism of Claude Lévy-Strauss.

In 1972 Clarke joined the Department of Sociology at the University of Warwick where he remained until his retirement in 2009. He was head of the Russian Research Programme at Warwick and director of the Institute for Comparative Labour Relations in Moscow.

Clarke died on 27 December 2022, at the age of 76.

== Political economy and social theory ==
In the 1970s and 1980s Simon Clarke was best known for his work in the fields of social theory and political economy. His early work focused on the roots of modern sociology, critiquing structuralism and examining the history of the discipline from its origins in classical political economy through to its modern form.

During this period Clarke worked on crisis theory. In Marx's Theory of Crisis he argues that "Marx does not so much offer a theory of crisis as a fundamentally different foundation for the analysis of the capitalist economy from that on which bourgeois economics is built." He concludes:

The debate that has dominated Marxism between disproportionality theories, underconsumptionist theories, and falling rate of profit theories of crisis has really been a red herring. A crisis arises when capitalists face a fall in their realised profit which can arise for all manner of reasons, but the precipitating cause of any particular crisis is inconsequential. Although all three aspects of disproportionality, underconsumptionist and the tendency for the rate of profit to fall play a role in determining the vulnerability of capitalism to crisis, the underlying cause of all crises remains the fundamental contradiction on which the capitalist mode of production is based, the contradiction between the production of things and the production of value, and the subordination of the former to the latter.

Marx's Theory of Crisis was published in 1994. Clarke's work has been influential on the Open Marxist tradition.

== Post-Soviet Labour Relations ==
In 1990 Simon Clarke gave a series of lectures to a group of young Soviet sociologists at the Institute of Youth in Moscow. This led to the formation of the Institute for Comparative Labour Relations (ISITO), a collaborative project between British and Russian academics focused on the study of labour markets in post-Soviet nations. In contrast to existing British projects which focused on data analysis, and existing Soviet projects in which only quantitive data was considered scientific, ISITO was responsible for both the gathering and analysis of qualitative data. Much of this work was based on comparative case studies of industrial enterprises. Data was also obtained using surveys based on newly obtained qualitative data.

In conversation with Sarah Ashwin and Valary Yakubovich, Clarke notes that the data generated by ISITO provided rigorous, scientific proof of a number of existing hypotheses which had been proposed by past experience. One striking discovery was the degree to which entities in post-socialist Russia, including trade unions and industrial management, continued to reproduce the culture and practices of the Soviet period. Another surprise discovery, made by Lena Varshaveskaya using data from the 1998 domestic survey, was the refutation of the assumption that domestic agriculture had offered a lifeline to the poor; rather this was found to be a leisure activity of better off. Clarke concludes:

Another key finding concerned the dominance of institutional over market determinants of wage differentiation, strongly supportive of the traditional, though largely forgotten, argument of industrial relations specialists against labor economists and, in a similar vein, of the inability of labor economics to explain the domestic division of paid and unpaid labor. For me, as a one-time economist, these are among our most satisfying findings because I think that the principal responsibility of the social sciences today is to challenge and undermine the scientific pretensions of neoclassical economics, to show it up as the vacuous and pernicious ideology that it is.

In 1998 the research program was extended to cover post-socialist trade unions in China and Vietnam. The final ISITO seminar was held in March 2014.

== Selected bibliography ==
Simon Clarke lists the following as his most significant publications:

- The Foundations of Structuralism, Harvester, 1981
- Marx, Marginalism and Modern Sociology, Macmillan, 1982
- Keynesianism, Monetarism and the Crisis of the State, Edward Elgar, 1988
- Marx's Theory of Crisis, Macmillan, 1994
- What About the Workers? Works and the Transition to Capitalism in Russia (with Peter Fairbrother, Michael Burawoy, and Pavel Krotov), Verso, 1993
- The Workers' Movement in Russia (with Peter Fairbrother and Vadim Borisov), Edward Elgar, 1995
- The Formation of a Labour Market in Russia (with Sarah Ashwin), Edward Elgar, 1999
- Trade Unions and International relations in Post-Communist Russia (with Sarah Ashwin), Palgrave, 2002
- The Development of Capitalism in Russia, Routledge, 2007
- The Challenge of Transition: Trade Unions in Russia, China and Vietnam (with Tim Pringle), Palgrave, 2010

A more complete list including refereed articles can be found on Simon Clarke's publications page.
