= Peter Luke =

British writer and producer (1919–1995)

Peter Ambrose Cyprian Luke MC (12 August 1919 – 23 January 1995) was a British writer, editor and producer.

== Early years ==
Luke was born in St Albans, he was the first son of Sir Harry Luke and his wife Joyce Evelyn Fremlin. He had wanted to be a painter, and went to art school for two years before World War II broke out. He was awarded the Military Cross for his service during the war. Some time after, he worked under producer Sydney Newman on the British television drama anthology Armchair Theatre, as a story editor. In 1967, he adapted Frederick Rolfe's novel Hadrian the Seventh for the stage. In 1984, he published a solitary novel The Other Side of the Hill set during the Peninsular War. This was adapted into a BBC radio drama in 1993 with Michael Pennington and John Moffat, and directed by Glyn Dearman.

He was married to Carola Peyton-Jones (deceased), then Lettice Crawshaw (one daughter, one son deceased; marriage dissolved), and finally June Tobin (two sons, three daughters).

He died in Cádiz on 23 January 1995.

== Timeline of events ==
- 1946–1947 – Sub-editor, Reuters News Desk
- 1947–1957 – Wine trader
- 1958–1962 – Story editor, ABC Weekend TV
- 1962–1963 – Editor, arts series The Bookman (ABC TV)
- 1963–1964 – Editor, Tempo (ABC TV)
- 1963–1968 – Drama producer, writer and director BBC TV
- 1977–1980 – Director, Edwards-Mac Liammoir Dublin Gate Theatre Company

== List of works ==
- 1967 – Hadrian the Seventh
- 1974 – Bloomsbury
- 1977 – Rings for a Spanish Lady
- 1978 – Proxopera
- 1985 – Married Love: The Apotheosis of Marie Stopes
- 1987 – Yerma
- 1993 – The Other Side of the Hill; BBC radio drama based on his only novel
