= Tom Clarke (writer) =

English screenwriter

Tom Clarke (7 November 1918 – 14 January 1993) was an English screenwriter. He belonged to the short-lived "Langham Group" of television writers and directors. He was the father of the British sociologist Simon Clarke and was the brother-in-law of screenwriter Philip Mackie.

Clarke was born in England to an American father. He left school to become an apprentice electrician, but began working in the theatre, and was briefly an actor. He served in the Royal Artillery during World War II, and subsequently studied to become a barrister. Re-locating to Brazil during the early 1950s, he worked as a film editor and directed some documentaries.

On return to the UK, Clarke worked mainly as a television writer, creating plays, drama series and sitcoms. In 1958 he became part of the "Drama Experimental Unit" at the BBC, along with others such as Troy Kennedy Martin and Anthony Pelissier; they were disbanded in 1960.

== Works ==
- Mad Jack (1971)
- Billion Dollar Bubble (1975)
- Victims of Apartheid (1978)
- Muck and Brass (1982)
- Past Caring (1986)
