= Clive Graham =

British actor (1937–2007)

Clive Graham (7 October 1937 in Swansea– 11 June 2007) was a British television actor.

He had a lengthy career, roles included Robin of Locksley in Ivanhoe.
