= John Sydney Lethbridge =

British Army general

Major-General John Sydney Lethbridge CB CBE MC
- Born: 11 December 1897; Barrackpore, India
- Died: 11 August 1961 (aged 63); Devon, England
- Military career
- Allegiance: United Kingdom
- Branch: British Army
- Service years: 1915–1960
- Rank: Major-General
- Service number: 13389
- Unit: Royal Engineers
- Conflicts: First World War; Third Anglo-Afghan War; Second World War
- Awards: Companion of the Order of the Bath; Commander of the Order of the British Empire; Military Cross; Commander of the Legion of Merit (United States)

Major-General John Sydney Lethbridge, CB, CBE, MC (11 December 1897 – 11 August 1961) was a senior British Army officer. He served as a commissioned officer with the Royal Engineers on the Western Front during the early years of the First World War and later in the Middle East. He spent much of the interwar period serving in British India. On the outbreak of the Second World War, he was posted to the British Expeditionary Force in France, later serving as Commander, Royal Engineers in the 59th (Staffordshire) Infantry Division. He spent the later war years as a staff officer. After the end of the war, he served in senior civil defence roles. He died in 1961, shortly after his retirement from the British Army.

== Early life ==
Born in Barrackpore, India, the son of Lieutenant Colonel Sydney Lethbridge and Susannah Maud Slator, Lethbridge was educated at Gresham's School, Uppingham School, the Royal Military Academy, Woolwich, and Jesus College, Cambridge.

== Military career ==
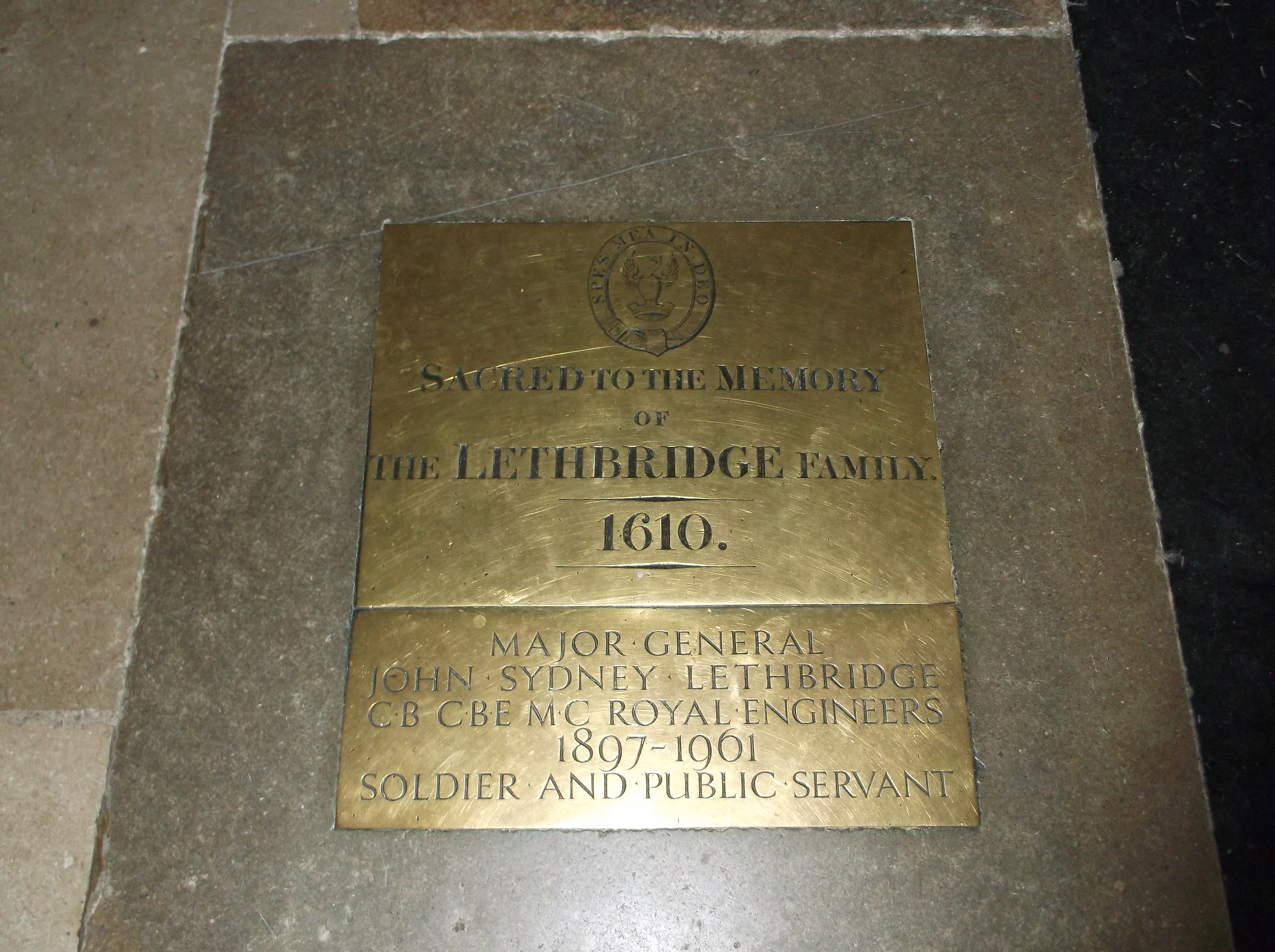
Memorial to Lethbridge and his family in Exeter Cathedral

Lethbridge was commissioned into the Corps of Royal Engineers in 1915 during the First World War and saw active service on the Western Front with 123 Field Company at the first battle of Ypres in 1915 and later at the Battle of the Somme in 1916. As a temporary Captain with the King George V's Own Bengal Sappers and Miners, Lethbridge was posted to India in 1917 before serving with the Aden Frontier Force for operations in southern Arabia between 1917 and 1918.

Lethbridge commanded, as acting major, a company of King George V's Own Bengal Sappers and Miners in Afghanistan and on the North West Frontier during the Third Anglo-Afghan War from 1919 to 1922. He served again with King George V's Own Bengal Sappers and Miners at Roorkee and Rawalpindi and saw active service in Peshawar against Afridi raiders in 1930. After graduating from Staff College at Quetta in 1932 he became Superintendent of Instruction at Roorkee and was then appointed a Field Works major at Chatham in 1933. He joined the General Staff at Headquarters, Northern Command at York and then transferred to the Military Operations Branch and Directorate of Recruiting and Organisation at the War Office in 1936 before becoming an instructor at the Senior Officers' School at Sheerness in 1939.

Lethbridge served in the Second World War with the British Expeditionary Force in France in 1939 before becoming Commander Royal Engineers for the 59th (Staffordshire) Infantry Division. He went on to be deputy director of Staff Duties at the War Office in 1940, liaison officer with US Forces in London in 1942 and leader of the 'Lethbridge Mission' to study tactics and equipment required to defeat Japan in the Far East in 1943. His last war appointment was as Chief of Staff for the 14th Army in Burma from 1944 under the command of General Sir William Slim.

After the war, Lethbridge became Chief of Intelligence for the Control Commission for Germany and British Army of the Rhine in 1945, commandant of the Civil Defence Staff College in 1949 and Director of Civil Defence for the South West Region (Bristol) in September 1955. Lethbridge retired to Bondleigh, near North Tawton, in Devon, but died in August 1961, less than a year after his retirement.

== Family ==
In 1925, Lethbridge married Katharine Greville Maynard, the daughter of Sir John Maynard, in Shimla, India, and they had one son and two daughters.

== Honours ==
- Military Cross, 1919
- Commander of the Order of the British Empire, 1942
- Companion of the Order of the Bath, 1946
- Commander, US Legion of Merit, 1946

== Bibliography ==
- Smart, Nick (2005). Biographical Dictionary of British Generals of the Second World War. Barnesley: Pen & Sword. ISBN 1844150496.
