= List of Theatre 625 episodes =

Theatre 625 is a British television drama anthology series, produced by the BBC and transmitted on BBC2 from 1964 to 1968. It was one of the first regular programmes in the line-up of the channel, and the title referred to its production and transmission being in the higher-definition 625-line format, which only BBC2 used at the time.

The primary list source is the BFI Film & TV database. The masterlist is here. With a certain irregularity in transmission, breaking the list down into specific seasons is likely to be arbitrary, with variants between sources; the BFI website has been followed, except (as noted) where the lostshows website diverged in a few instances. The Internet Movie Database and the BBC Genome database (of Radio Times listings) have been used as a check, and occasionally as the main source. The information about survival status in the last column is taken from the TV Archive and The Kaleidoscope BBC Television Drama Research Guide, 1936–2011 and are correct as of 9 June 2025. A handful of the surviving episodes have been commercially released on DVD; these are footnoted.

== List of episodes ==
Legend: Se = Season; Ep = Episode; AS/A = Archive status/Availability
Abbreviations: tr =Telerecording; seq = sequence(s); VT = video tape

All known copies are black & white, except where stated otherwise.

Se	Ep	Title	Author	Producer	Director	Performers	UK Transmission date	AS/A
1	1	The Seekers: The Heretics	Ken Taylor	Cedric Messina	Alvin Rakoff	Michael Bryant, Derek Godfrey, Rosemary Leach, Newton Blick, Robert James, Kevin Brennan, David Hutcheson, Ivor Salter, Murray Evans, Joseph Greig, Timothy West	3 May 1964	35mm tr
1	2	The Seekers: The Idealists	Ken Taylor	Cedric Messina	Alvin Rakoff	Michael Bryant, Patrick Allen, Suzanne Neve, John Robinson, Brian Haynes, Peter Welch, David J. Grahame, Vernon Dobtcheff, Brian Vaughan	10 May 1964	35mm tr
1	3	The Seekers: The Materialists	Ken Taylor	Cedric Messina	Alvin Rakoff	Michael Bryant, Geoffrey Bayldon, Sylvia Kay, John Welsh, John Lee, Edward Brayshaw, Ronald Lacey	17 May 1964	35mm tr
1	4	All the Conspirators: The Ides of March	Jerome Kilty based on the novel by Thornton Wilder.	Cedric Messina	Naomi Capon	Hugh Burden, Tim Preece, Douglas Wilmer, Fenella Fielding, Alexander Davion, Judy Campbell, Anna Middleton, Michael Gough, Declan Mulholland	5 Jul 1964	Lost
1	5	All the Conspirators: The Just	Albert Camus (play, The Just Assassins)	Cedric Messina	Alan Cooke	James Maxwell, Ann Lynn, Lyndon Brook, John Castle, David Buck, Reg Lye, Roland Brand, Robert Eddison, Ruth Dunning	12 Jul 1964	Lost
2	1	Women in Crisis: Husband and Wife	Colin Morris	Cedric Messina	Naomi Capon	Wendy Craig, John Ronane, Barry Keegan, Elizabeth Wallace, Alison Leggatt, John Robinson, Michael Goodliffe, Edward Fox, Vivien Heilbron, Richard Brooke	20 Sep 1964	Lost
2	2	Women in Crisis: With Love and Tears	Colin Morris	Cedric Messina	William Slater	Katharine Blake, Nigel Green, Alan Baulch, Margot Robinson, Margaret Ward, Margaret Denyer, Michael Brennan, Peter Thornton	27 Sep 1964	16mm tr
2	3	Women in Crisis: My Grandmother	Colin Morris	Cedric Messina	George R. Foa	Janina Faye, Dilys Hamlett, Anthony Singleton, Philip Latham, Veronica Turleigh, John Humphry, Paul Farrell, Vi Delmar, Brian Peck, Meriel Hobson	4 Oct 1964	16mm tr
2	4	Carried by Storm	Giles Cooper	Cedric Messina	Donald McWhinnie	Simon Ward, Tim Preece, Peter Marinker, Nicholas Courtney, Pauline Delaney, Mary Haneffey, Ronald Lacey, Roslyn De Winter, John Dearth, John Flint, Brian Badcoe, Denys Hawthorne, Nicholas Pennell, Colin Spaull, Tim Goodman	25 Oct 1964	Lost
2	5	Parade's End: Some Do Not	Ford Madox Ford (novels); John Hopkins (adaptation)	Cedric Messina	Alan Cooke	Ronald Hines, Fulton Mackay, Darroll Richards, Charles Carson, Ronald Leigh-Hunt, Sylvia Coleridge, Godfrey Quigley, Jeanne Moody, Judi Dench, Annette Robertson, Tony Steedman; Frank Gatliff, Inigo Jackson, Gerry Wain, Robert James, Erik Chitty, Nicholas Pennell	6 Dec 1964	16mm tr
2	6	Parade's End: No More Parades	Ford Madox Ford (novels); John Hopkins (adaptation)	Cedric Messina	Alan Cooke	Jeanne Moody, Ronald Hines, Sylvia Kay, Ronald Leigh-Hunt, Judi Dench, Arthur Pentelow, Fulton MacKay, Nicholas Pennell, Talfryn Thomas, Colin Jeavons, Tony Steedman	13 Dec 1964	16mm tr
2	7	Parade's End: A Man Could Stand Up	Ford Madox Ford (novels); John Hopkins (adaptation)	Cedric Messina	Alan Cooke	Judi Dench, Ruth Porcher, Ronald Hines, Arthur White, Michel Ray, Bryan Hunt, Charles Houston, Arthur Lovegrove, Shane Rimmer, Edward Burnham, Douglas Ditta, Philip Stone, Derrick Glibert, Peter Purves, Tony Steedman, Barry Jackson, Maurice Selwyn	20 Dec 1964	35mm tr
2	8	The Minister	John O'Toole	Eric Tayler	Peter Potter	Michael Gough, Jessica Dunning, Nadia Cattouse, Barbara Jefford, Earl Cameron, Mark Dignam, Roger Livesey, Noel Johnson, Bernard Horsfall, Denis Carey, Thomasine Heiner, Antony Webb, Ralph Michael	3 Jan 1965	Lost
2	9	Poor Bitos	Jean Anouilh (play, Pauvre Bitos ou le Dîner de têtes); Lucienne Hill (translator)	Cedric Messina	Donald McWhinnie	John Neville, Noel Davis, Rolf Lefebvre, Penelope Horner, Anne Cunningham, Patrick Allen, Geoffrey Chater, James Villiers, Nicholas Pennell, Gemma Jones, Tony Calvin	7 Feb 1965	Lost
2	10	The Physicists	Friedrich Dürrenmatt (play), James Kirkup (translation)	Peter Luke	Cedric Messina	Mary Morris, Tom Watson, Hayden Jones, John Bennett, Michael Kilgarriff, Neil McCarthy	14 Feb 1965	Lost
2	11	Progress to the Park	Alun Owen (play)	Cedric Messina	Christopher Morahan	Ken Jones, John Scott Martin, Will Leighton, Gavin Reed, Patrick McAlliney, John McBride, Walter Swash, David Nott, Gerald McAllister, Malcolm Taylor, Eddie Mallin, Peter McEnery, Patrick Tull	14 Mar 1965	16mm tr
2	12	No Trams to Lime Street	Alun Owen (remake of 1959 TV play)	Cedric Messina	David J. Thomas	Mike Pratt, Tom Bell, Anthony Hall, Clifford Evans, Ishaq Bux, Alister Williamson, Islwyn Morris, June Barry	21 Mar 1965	Lost
2	13	A Little Winter Love	Alun Owen	Cedric Messina	David J. Thomas	Jack Hedley, Peter Dyneley, Lelia Goldoni, Sylvia Kay, Mike Pratt, Artro Morris, Nerys Hughes	28 Mar 1965	Lost
2	14	Ironhand	J. W. Goethe (play Götz von Berlichingen); John Arden (adaptation)	Cedric Messina	Rudolph Cartier	Roger Jones, William Dysart, Edward Purdom, Michael Brennan, Denis Cleary, Gertan Klauber, Marshall Jones, Stanley Lebor, Michael Goodliffe, Nicholas Evans, John Glyn-Jones, Graham Leaman, Ian Ogilvy, Jerome Willis, David Dodimead, Michael Mulcaster, Derek Sydney, Roy Pattison	11 Apr 1965	16mm tr
2	15	Try For White	Basil Warner	Cedric Messina	Alan Gibson	Yootha Joyce, Joss Ackland, Gary Bond, Zoe Randall, Marda Vanne, Nan Munro, Maxine Holden	18 Apr 1965	Lost
2	16	Unman, Wittering and Zigo	Giles Cooper	Cedric Messina	Donald McWhinnie	Peter Blythe, John Sharp, Peter Howell, Tamara Kinchco, Noel Davis, Ann Way, Norman Wynne, Jeremy Ranchev, Roger Shepherd, Robert Dodson, Roger Bradley, Michael Wenning, Christopher Witty, Dane Howell, Dennis Waterman, Hywel Bennett, Norman Bacon	27 Jun 1965	35mm tr
2	17	Seek Her Out	Giles Cooper	Cedric Messina	Alan Gibson	Toby Robins, Anthony Newlands, Zakes Mokae, Edward Brayshaw, John Woodvine, Robert James, Peter Diamond	4 Jul 1965	35mm tr - reels 2 & 3 only of 3
2	18	The Long House	Giles Cooper	Cedric Messina	Naomi Capon	David Buck, Caroline Mortimer, Toke Townley, Joan Hickson, Arthur Pentelow, Thomas Baptiste, Sheila Grant, Frederick Piper, Winifred Dennis, John Herrington, Reg Lever	11 Jul 1965	35mm tr
3	1	Esther's Altar	Paul Smith	Cedric Messina	Alan Gibson	Kevin McHugh, Margaret D'Arcy, Betty McDowell, Barry Keegan, Pauline Delaney, Audrey Corr, Jack MacGowran, Liam Gaffney, James Caffrey, Anna Manahan, Dermot Tuohy, Graham Leaman	5 Sep 1965	Lost
3	2	David, Chapter 2	M. Charles Cohen	Harvey Hart for the Canadian Broadcasting Corporation		Donnelly Rhodes, Toby Tarnow, Powys Thomas, Lynne Gorman	19 Sep 1965	Unknown
3	3	Rosmersholm	Henrik Ibsen (play); Ann Jellicoe (translation)	Cedric Messina	Michael Barry	Peggy Ashcroft, Knut Wigert, Mark Dignam, Angela Baddeley, Morris Perry, John Laurie	26 Sep 1965	16mm tr
3	4	Miss Julie	August Strindberg (play); Alan Bridges (adaptation)	Cedric Messina	Alan Bridges	Gunnel Lindblom, Ian Hendry, Stephanie Bidmead	3 Oct 1965	35mm tr
3	5	Hermit Crabs	Mary Hayley Bell	Cedric Messina	Gilchrist Calder	Annette Crosbie, Anthony Booth, Billy Cornelius, Clyde Pollitt, Gladys Henson, Anne Blake, Bill Cartwright, William Moore	10 Oct 1965	Lost
3	6	Enter Solly Gold	Bernard Kops (play)	Cedric Messina	Stuart Burge	Bob Monkhouse, Linda Polan, Terence Sewards, Miriam Margolyes, John Barrard, Lilly Kann, Cyril Shaps, George Layton	17 Oct 1965	35mm tr sequences only
3	7	The Siege of Manchester	Keith Dewhurst	Cedric Messina	Herbert Wise	Alan Dobie, Doris Wellings, Eve Pearce, Eileen Winterton, Derek Benfield, André Morell, Sian Davies, John Dearth, Reginald Barratt, Donald Eccles, Frazer Hines, Harry Littlewood, Kevin Stoney, Brian Peck, Jeremy Spenser, David Valla, Malcolm Taylor, Michael Davis	31 Oct 1965	Lost
3	8	The World of George Orwell: Keep the Aspidistra Flying	George Orwell (novel); Robin Chapman (adaptation)	Cedric Messina	Christopher Morahan	Alfred Lynch, Charles Hodgson, Winifred Dennis, Marie Hopps, Sydney Bromley, Hilda Barry, Clive Elliott, Anne Stallybrass, Norman Mitchell, Sydney Arnold, Sheila Grant, Bartlett Mullins, Alec Wallis	7 Nov 1965	Lost
3	9	The World of George Orwell: Coming Up for Air	George Orwell (novel); Robin Chapman (adaptation)	Cedric Messina	Christopher Morahan	Colin Blakely, Frederick Farley, Maitland Moss, Larry Dann, Carmel McSharry, Ann Way, Peggy Aitchison, Reginald Jessup, Howard Lang, Patrick Godfrey, Clifford Cox	21 Nov 1965	Lost
3	10	The World of George Orwell: 1984	George Orwell (novel); Nigel Kneale (adaptation)	Cedric Messina	Christopher Morahan	David Buck, Joseph O'Conor, Vernon Dobtcheff, Jane Merrow, Cyril Shaps, Norman Chappell, Sally Lahee, John Garrie, John Mincer, Peter Bathurst, John Brandon, Eric Francis, Sydney Arnold, David Grey, John Abineri, Michael Sheard, Brian Badcoe	28 Nov 1965	NTSC VT of 16mm tr (damage to one scene)
3	11	Portraits From the North: The Nutter	Alan Plater	Cedric Messina	Alan Gibson	Milo O'Shea, Ronald Lacey, Mike Pratt, Tristram Jellinek, Henry Soskin, Sidney Gatcum, Faith Curtis, Ken Parry, Joseph O'Conor, Helen Fraser, Yootha Joyce, John Cater, Richard Mathews	5 Dec 1965	Lost
3	12	Portraits From the North: Bruno	Ronald Eyre	Cedric Messina	Ronald Eyre	John Phillips, Ronnie Barker, Anne Stallybrass, Hazel Cooper, John Gill, Noel Dyson, Barry Jackson, Susan Hanson, Fred Ferris, Gary Files, Barbara Miller	19 Dec 1965	Lost
3	13	A Piece of Resistance	Terence Dudley	Cedric Messina	Geoffrey Nethercott	Lally Bowers, William Kendall, Frederick Jaeger, James Villiers	26 Dec 1965	Lost
3	14	Doctor Knock	Jules Romains (play, Knock ou le Triomphe de la médecine); Harley Granville-Barker (translator)	Cedric Messina	Herbert Wise	Mavis Villiers, Leonard Rossiter, John Le Mesurier, Jimmy Gardner, James Grout, Graham Armitage, Robert Gillespie, Patrick Godfrey	2 Jan 1966	16mm tr
3	15	Focus	Arthur Miller (novel); Ruth Sheale (adaptation)	Michael Bakewell	Alan Gibson	Vivien Merchant, Ray McAnally, Sydney Tafler, Joss Ackland, Lucille Fenton, Larry Cross, Pearl Catlin, Donald Sutherland, Glenn Beck, Martin Miller	9 Jan 1966	Lost
3	16	The Wesker Trilogy, Part 1: Chicken Soup with Barley	Arnold Wesker (play)	Cedric Messina	Charles Jarrott	Margery Mason, Clive Revill, Stanley Meadows, John Allison, Sonia Fraser, Stella Tanner, Harry Landis, David Swift	23 Jan 1966	35mm tr
3	17	The Wesker Trilogy, Part 2: Roots	Arnold Wesker (play)	Cedric Messina	Charles Jarrott	Mary Miller, Gwen Nelson, Ewan Hooper, Doreen Aris, Billy Russell, Brian Cant, Leslie Anderson, Jonathan Holt, Maryann Turner	30 Jan 1966	35mm tr
3	18	The Wesker Trilogy, Part 3: I'm Talking About Jerusalem	Arnold Wesker (play)	Cedric Messina	Charles Jarrott	Sonia Fraser, Stanley Meadows, Margery Mason, John Allison, John Harvey, Stella Tanner, Hilda Kriseman, Patrick O'Connell, Jeremy Bulloch, Jack Wild	6 Feb 1966	35mm tr
3	19	Kiss on a Grass Green Pillow	Rhys Adrian	Cedric Messina	Alan Cooke	Susannah York, Zena Walker, Robert Stephens, Colin Blakely	13 Feb 1966	Lost
3	20	A Man Like That	H. S. Eveling	Cedric Messina	Peter Duguid	Irene Handl, Norman Bird, Annette Crosbie, Jeanne Moody, Colin Ellis, Margaret Nolan, Hazel Coppin, Stella Tanner, Terry Wright, Stephen Moore, Stephen Dartnell, Victor Carin, Nicholas Smith, John Abineri, Michael Barrington, Rosamund Greenwood	27 Feb 1966	16mm tr
3	21	Simon and Laura	Alan Melville	Cedric Messina	Christopher Morahan	Moira Lister, Ian Carmichael, Richard Briers, Henry McGee, Charles Lloyd-Pack, Molly Urquhart, Penny Morrell, Philo Hauser	6 Mar 1966	
3	22	The Queen and Jackson	Donald Bull	Cedric Messina	John Gorrie	George Baker, Jill Dixon, Madeleine Christie, Willoughby Goddard, Sylvia Coleridge, James Cossins, Eric Hillyard, Arthur Hewlett, Roy Marsden	13 Mar 1966	Lost
3	23	A Month in the Country	Ivan Turgenev (play); Elisaveta Fen (translator)	Cedric Messina	Christopher Morahan	Vivien Merchant, Derek Godfrey, Michele Dotrice, Hywel Bennett, Timothy Darwen, Jan Conrad, Enid Lorimer, Susan Field, Philip Latham, John Baskcomb	20 Mar 1966	16mm tr
3	24	The Seagull	Anton Chekhov (play); George Calderon (translation)	Cedric Messina	Alan Cooke	Pamela Brown, Niall MacGinnis, Annette Crosbie, Gemma Jones, Robert Stephens, Sydney Tafler, Charles Carson, Robin Phillips	27 Mar 1966	16mm tr
3	25	Twelfth Hour	Aleksei Arbuzov (play, Dvenadtsaty chas); Ariadne Nicolaeff (adaptation)	Cedric Messina	Alan Cooke	Clifford Evans, Michael Goodliffe, Sheila Allen, Dudley Foster, Walter Brown, Hannah Gordon, Thelma Ruby, Elizabeth Wallace, William Holmes, Mark Jones, John Barrard	3 Apr 1966	35mm tr
3	26	The Queen and the Welshman	Rosemary Anne Sisson (play)	Cedric Messina	Basil Coleman	Dorothy Tutin, Derek Godfrey, Jeremy Brett, Nicholas Selby, Gordon Whiting, Llewellyn Rees, Fiona Hartford, Charles Thomas, Robert Russell, Jack Wild, Harry Littlewood	10 Apr 1966	16mm tr
3	27	Final Demand	Hugh Whitemore	Cedric Messina	Bill Hays	Kenneth More, Michael Forrest, Ken Wynne	24 Apr 1966	Lost
3	28	Semi-Detached	David Turner (play)	Cedric Messina	Gilchrist Calder	Leonard Rossiter, Alison Leggatt, Barrie Ingham, William Kendall	1 May 1966	Lost
3	29	She Stoops to Conquer	Oliver Goldsmith (play)	Brandon Acton-Boyd	Roger Jenkins (for the BBC), Val May (theatre production)	Patrick Stewart, Hazel Hughes, Barbara Leigh-Hunt, Gawn Grainger, Anna Carteret	29 May 1966	16mm tr
3	30	Up and Down	Julia Jones	Michael Bakewell	Mary Ridge	George Baker, Bernard Archard, Ann Lynn, John Collin, Keith Bell, Marion Mathie, John Moore	5 Jun 1966	Lost
3	31	Marianne	Rhys Davies (novel); Harry Greene (adaptation)	Cedric Messina	John Gorrie	Nerys Hughes, Jan Edwards, Henley Thomas, Rachel Thomas, Artro Morris, Gwyneth Owen, Salmean Peer	12 Jun 1966	Lost
3	32	The Melody Suit	Christopher Dandy (words); Derrick Mason (music)	Michael Bakewell	Alan Gibson	John Gower, Patricia Michael, Michael Maurel	19 Jun 1966	Lost
3	33	On the March to the Sea	Gore Vidal (novel);	Cedric Messina	Alan Gibson	Joss Ackland, Barrie Ingham, Tony Bill, Tessa Wyatt, Tucker McGuire, Stella Tanner, Lindsay Campbell, Richard James, Peter Madden, Donald Sutherland	17 Jul 1966	NTSC VT of 16mm tr
3	34	How to Get Rid of Your Husband	Robert Gould	Cedric Messina	Naomi Capon	Maurice Denham, Priscilla Morgan, Avis Bunnage, Denise Coffey, Marcus Hammond, Margaret Heald, Winifred Dennis, Norman Scace, Keith Anderson, Richard Hampton, Malcolm Taylor, Don McKillop	24 Jul 1966	Lost
3	35	Girl of My Dreams	Hugh Whitemore	Cedric Messina	Bill Hays	Nicholas Pennell, Chela Matthison, Edward Fox, James Grout, Kathleen Michael, Anne Brooks, Jennifer Jayne, George A. Cooper, John D. Collins, Ian Cunningham	31 Jul 1966	35mm tr
4	1	Talking to a Stranger, Part 1: Anytime You're Ready I'll Sparkle	John Hopkins	Michael Bakewell	Christopher Morahan	Judi Dench, Michael Bryant, Maurice Denham, Margery Mason, Emrys James, Timothy Carlton, Calvin Lockhart	2 Oct 1966	35mm tr
4	2	Talking to a Stranger, Part 2: No Skill or Special Knowledge is Required	John Hopkins	Michael Bakewell	Christopher Morahan	Maurice Denham, Michael Bryant, Judi Dench, Margery Mason, Emrys James, Calvin Lockhart, Ann Mitchell, Frederick Pyne, Barry Stanton	9 Oct 1966	35mm tr
4	3	Talking to a Stranger, Part 3: Gladly My Cross-Eyed Bear	John Hopkins	Michael Bakewell	Christopher Morahan	Michael Bryant, Judi Dench, Maurice Denham, Margery Mason, Windsor Davies, Terry Leigh	16 Oct 1966	35mm tr
4	4	Talking to a Stranger, Part 4: The Innocent Must Suffer	John Hopkins	Michael Bakewell	Christopher Morahan	Margery Mason, Michael Bryant, Judi Dench, Maurice Denham, Mariann Turner, Emrys James, Windsor Davies	23 Oct 1966	35mm tr
4	5	Conquest: The Encounter	Brian Rawlinson	Michael Bakewell	Michael Hayes	Barrie Ingham, Donald Eccles, Malcolm Webster, Frederick Jaeger, Sebastian Breaks, Michael Pennington, Hamilton Dyce, Janet Suzman, Alan Dobie, Jane Wenham, John Nettleton, Peter Halliday, David Garfield, Bernard Hepton, John Sharp, Noel Johnson, George Selway, John Cater, Timothy Bateson, Terence Lodge	29 Oct 1966	Lost
4	6	Conquest: The Leopard and the Dragon	Brian Rawlinson	Michael Bakewell	Michael Hayes	Barrie Ingham, Donald Eccles, Malcolm Webster, Frederick Jaeger, Sebastian Breaks, Hamilton Dyce, Janet Suzman, Alan Dobie; John Nettleton, Peter Halliday, David Garfield, Noel Johnson, John Sharp, George Selway, John Cater, Terence Lodge, Bernard Hepton, Joby Blanshard	30 Oct 1966	Lost
4	7	Amerika	Franz Kafka (novel); Hugh Whitemore (adaptation)	Michael Bakewell	James Ferman	Michael Wenham, Bernard Bresslaw, Harold Goldblatt, Roy Dotrice, George Murcell, Janet Webb, Pauline Collins, Carl Jaffe, George Eugeniou, Gábor Baraker, Henry McCarthy, Vladek Sheybal, Michele Dotrice, Warren Mitchell, Hana Maria Pravda	6 Nov 1966	Lost
4	8	The Family Reunion	T. S. Eliot (play)	Michael Bakewell	Alan Cooke	Alec McCowen, Mary Morris, Mary Merrall, Janet Suzman, Geoffrey Bayldon, Sylvia Coleridge, Victor Maddern, Maureen Pryor, Nigel Stock	27 Nov 1966	35mm tr
4	9	Anatol	Arthur Schnitzler	Bernard Hepton	Christopher Morahan	Robert Hardy, John Wood, Moira Redmond, Elvi Hale, Priscilla Morgan	4 Dec 1966	
4	10	Sword of Honour, Part One: Men at Arms	Evelyn Waugh (novels); Giles Cooper (adaptation)	Michael Bakewell	Donald McWhinnie	Edward Woodward, Ronald Fraser, Vivian Pickles, Paul Hardwick, James Villiers, Donald Layne-Smith, Trader Faulkner, Tim Preece, Nicholas Hawtrey, David Savile, Clifford Cox, Jimmy Gardner, Keith Pyott, Esmond Webb, Richard Hampton, Denis McCarthy	2 Jan 1967	35mm tr
4	11	Sword of Honour, Part Two: Officers and Gentlemen	Evelyn Waugh (novels); Giles Cooper (adaptation)	Michael Bakewell	Donald McWhinnie	Edward Woodward, Trader Faulkner, Vivian Pickles, Anthony Roye, James Villiers, Donald Layne-Smith, Nicholas Hawtrey, Tim Preece, Clifford Cox, Erik Chitty, Richard Hampton, Peter Howell, Dennis Chinnery, Robert Fyfe, Douglas Ditta, Sydney Bromley, Freddie Jones, Geoffrey Chater, James Beck, John Flint, Nicholsas Courtney, Ronald Fraser	9 Jan 1967	35mm tr
4	12	Sword of Honour, Part Three: Unconditional Surrender	Evelyn Waugh (novels); Giles Cooper (adaptation)	Michael Bakewell	Donald McWhinnie	Edward Woodward, John Martin, Donald Layne-Smith, Basil Dignam, Edward Bishop, Trader Faulkner, James Villiers, Anthony Roye, Freddie Jones, Vivian Pickles, George Waring, Nicholas Courtney, Denys Hawthorne, Will Stampe, Caroline Hunt, Paul Hardwick, Robert MacLeod	16 Jan 1967	35mm tr
4	13	A Slight Ache	Harold Pinter (play)	Michael Bakewell	Christopher Morahan	Maurice Denham, Hazel Hughes, Gordon Richardson	6 Feb 1967	625-line VT
4	14	A Night Out	Harold Pinter (play)	Michael Bakewell	Christopher Morahan	Tony Selby, Anna Wing, Avril Elgar, John Castle, Richard Moore, Peter Pratt, Kevin Barry, Billy Russell, Patrick Cato, Sydney Arnold, Chris Chittell	13 Feb 1967	625-line VT
4	15	The Basement	Harold Pinter	Michael Bakewell	Charles Jarrott	Derek Godfrey, Harold Pinter, Kika Markham	20 Feb 1967	35mm tr
4	16	Hotel Torpe	François Billetdoux (play)	Michael Bakewell	Rod Graham	Siobhán McKenna, John Slater, Ronald Hines, Hamilton Dyce, Joby Blanshard, Natalie Kent, Peter Pratt, Judith Arthy, Yemi Ajibade, Dorothy Edwards, Elizabeth Proud, Derek Seaton, Philip Voss	13 Mar 1967	Lost
4	17	As a Man Grows Older	Italo Svevo (novel, Senilità); Barry Bermange (adaptation)	Michael Bakewell	John Gibson	Derek Godfrey, Peter Blythe, Hilary Hardiman, Ilona Rodgers	3 Apr 1967	Lost
4	18	Kain	Alan Poolman	Lionel Harris	Lionel Harris	Keith Michell, J. G. Devlin, Audine Leith, Alan White, Candy Devine, Roger Cox, Teddy Plummer, Michael Williamson	17 Apr 1967	16mm film
4	19	The Loser	Alun Owen	Michael Bakewell	Stuart Burge	Bernard Cribbins, Geraldine Moffatt, Godfrey Quigley, Henley Thomas, Gwendolyn Watts	1 May 1967	Lost
4	20	The Winner	Alun Owen	Michael Bakewell	Alan Cooke	Susannah York, T. P. McKenna, Mark Burns	8 May 1967	Lost
4	21	The Fantasist	Alun Owen	Michael Bakewell	Peter Hammond	James Villiers, Charlotte Rampling, Anthony Bate, Paul Hardwick, Tim Preece, Gordon Waller, Jean Aubrey, Norman Shelley, Barbara Couper	15 May 1967	Lost
4	22	The Ragged Trousered Philanthropists	Robert Tressell (novel); Stuart Douglas (adaptation)	Michael Bakewell	Christopher Morahan	John Rees, Edward Fox, Bryan Pringle, Felix Felton, Bartlett Mullins, Jeffrey Segal, Keith Smith, Robert Bridges, George Roderick, Christopher Benjamin, John Rees, David Webb, Freddy Foote, Kenneth Benda, David Garth	29 May 1967	Lost
4	23	The Blood Knot	Athol Fugard (play)	Michael Bakewell	Robin Midgley	Athol Fugard, Charles Hyatt	12 Jun 1967	16mm tr
4	24	Henry IV	Luigi Pirandello (play, Enrico IV); Robert Muller (adaptation)	Michael Bakewell	Michael Hayes	Alan Badel, Maxine Audley, Anthony Newlands, Kika Markham, Neville Jason, Hamilton Dyce; Murray Melvin	26 Jun 1967	Lost
4	25	Firebrand	Roger Manvell, Scot Finch	Michael Bakewell	Rudolph Cartier	Ronald Lacey, Donald Pickering, Anton Diffring, Patricia Denys, Annette Carrell, Peter Vaughan; Kenneth J. Warren, David J. Grahame, Derek Newark, Cyril Shaps, Royston Tickner, Martin Benson	2 Jul 1967	16mm tr
4	26	The Plough and the Stars	Sean O’Casey	Lelia Doolan	Lelia Doolan		16 Jul 1967	
4	27	Tickle Times	Julia Jones	Michael Bakewell	Mary Ridge	Diana Coupland, John Stratton, David Collings, Keith Bell, Angela Crow, Edmond Bennett, Mike Pratt, Catherine Howe, Miriam Raymond, Kenneth Ives, Eric Francis, Keith Anderson	30 Jul 1967	Lost
4	28	55 Columns	Usha Priyamvada (novel); James Brabazon (adaptation)	Michael Bakewell	Rod Graham, Shivendra Sinha (co-director)	Edward de Souza, Rani Dubä, Lalita Ahmed, Roshan Seth, Zohra Segal, Bakshi Prem, Chitra Neogy, Esmë Sen, Devi Shah, Kelyani Sitaram	6 Aug 1967	35mm film sequences exist
4	29	Stan's Day Out	Rhys Adrian	Michael Bakewell	James MacTaggart	Leslie Dwyer, Alfie Bass, Roddy McMillan, Bryan Pringle, Michael Robbins	13 Aug 1967	35mm tr
4	30	The Cupboard	Maggie Ross	Michael Bakewell	Alan Gibson	Peter Jeffrey, Rosemary Leach, Donald Gee, Helen Booth, William Moore, Charles Lamb, Ella Milne	20 Aug 1967	Lost
5	1	The Memorandum	Václav Havel (play); Vera Blackwell (translation/adaptation)	Michael Bakewell	James Ferman	Alfred Marks, Warren Mitchell, Hattie Jacques, Judy Cornwell, Robert Eddison, Murray Melvin, John Sharp, Ronnie Stevens, Patsy Rowlands, Sydney Bromley	24 Sep 1967	Lost
5	2	The Lost Years of Brian Hooper	Bernard Kops	Michael Bakewell	Alan Gibson	Hugh Burden, Margery Mason; Sheila Reid, Ray Brooks, Alan MacNaughtan, Susan George, Kate Story, Carl Forgione, Edward de Souza, Peter Jesson	8 Oct 1967	35mm tr
5	3	The Magicians: Dr Dee, Kelly and the Spirits	Ken Taylor	Michael Bakewell	James MacTaggart	Alan Dobie, Frank Finlay, John Warner, Caroline Monkhouse, Rosemary Hall, Anthony Kemp, Mary Peach	15 Oct 1967	Lost
5	4	The Magicians: The Incantation of Casanova	Ken Taylor	Michael Bakewell	Herbert Wise	Jeremy Brett, Antony Webb; Geoffrey Bayldon, Anne Cunningham, Patrick O'Connell, Jacqueline Pearce, Daphne Anderson, George Selway	22 Oct 1967	35mm tr
5	5	The Magicians: Edmund Gurney and the Brighton Mesmerist	Ken Taylor	Michael Bakewell	Peter Hammond	Richard Todd, Ray Brooks, Anthony Bate, Lynda Baron, Diana Fairfax, John Barcroft, Barry Wilsher, Roger Kemp, John Baker, John Gill	29 Oct 1967	Lost
5	6	The Single Passion	Ronald Eyre	Cedric Messina	Stuart Burge	Alan Webb, Rosalie Crutchley, Michael Pennington, Christopher Timothy, Nigel Terry, John Allison, Tamara Hinchco, David Lincoln, George A. Cooper, Arnold Yarrow, Joby Blanshard, John Bryans	5 Nov 1967	Lost
5	7	The Burning Bush	Geza Herczeg (play); John Hopkins (adaptation)	Michael Bakewell	Rudolph Cartier	Emlyn Williams, Alan Keith, Peter Copley, Peter Woodthorpe, Stephen Murray, Marjorie Rhodes, Daphne Slater, Ronald Lacey	12 Nov 1967	Lost
5	8	Kittens Are Brave	Giles Cooper	Michael Bakewell	Donald McWhinnie	George Murcell, Diana Fairfax, Geoffrey Bayldon	26 Nov 1967	Lost
5	9	Lieutenant Tenant	Pierre Gripari (play)	Michael Bakewell	Donald McWhinnie	Angela Douglas, Bee Duffell, Philip Grout, Jimmy Thompson, Patrick Tull, Jimmy Gardner, David Battley, Job Stewart, Harold Innocent, Brian Steele, Noel Davis, Derek Needs, Henzie Raeburn, Dudley Jones	4 Dec 1967	Lost
5	10	Play With a Tiger	Doris Lessing (play)	Michael Bakewell	Stuart Burge	Barbara Jefford, John Turner, Michael Gough, Patricia Lawrence, Jeremy Burnham, Sharon Cathness	18 Dec 1967	Lost
5	11	To See How Far It Is: Murphy's Law	Alan Plater	Michael Bakewell	Rod Graham	Nigel Davenport, Norman Rodway, Ronald Hines, Donald Gee, Rhoda Lewis, John Bryans, Philip Bond, Arthur Cox, Dorothy Edwards	1 Jan 1968	16mm tr
5	12	To See How Far It Is: The Curse of the Donkins	Alan Plater	Michael Bakewell	Gilchrist Calder	Nigel Davenport, Norman Rodway, Stephanie Bidmead, John Bryans, Fiona Walker, Jill Melford, Clive Francis, Gareth Robinson, Richard Armour	8 Jan 1968	16mm tr
5	13	To See How Far It Is: To See How Far It Is	Alan Plater	Michael Bakewell	Naomi Capon	Nigel Davenport, Norman Rodway, Geoffrey Bayldon, Avril Elgar, Anne Stallybrass, Peter Stephens, John Bryans, Arthur Cox, Philip Bond, Tony Blackburn, Stephen Jack, Donald Gee, Rhoda Lewis, Patricia Maynard, Fiona Walker, Arnold Ridley	15 Jan 1968	16mm tr
5	14	Albinos in Black	Alun Richards	Michael Bakewell	James Cellan Jones	Gwen Ffrangcon-Davies, Gerald James, Meg Wynn Owen, Emrys Jones, Pauline Delaney, John Rees, Charles Williams, Sheila Irwin, Willie Jonah, Ilario Bisi-Pedro	22 Jan 1968	Lost
5	15	The Swallow's Nest	Robert Wales (play, The Cell); Graham Woodward (adaptation)	Michael Bakewell	Henric Hirsch	Annette Crosbie, Mary Morris, Ursula Jeans, Clare Austin, Nancy Nevinson, Henry Vidon, Sheila Whitmill, Andrea Brett	29 Jan 1968	Lost
5	16	The Lady is a Liar	Diego Fabbri; Maddalena Fagandini (English version)	Michael Bakewell	George R. Foa	Susan Hampshire, Robert Hardy, Eithne Dunne, Stanley Bates, Sean Barrett, Anthony Singleton, Dennis Edwards, Harriett Johns	26 Feb 1968	Lost
5	17	To the Frontier	Giles Cooper	Michael Bakewell	Donald McWhinnie	David Savile, Patrick Tull, Michael David, Ronald Hines, Kate Coleridge, Mike Arrighi, John Tordoff, Edina Ronay	4 Mar 1968	Lost
5	18	Party Games	Hugh Whitemore	Michael Bakewell	Rod Graham	Frederick Jaegar, Eileen Atkins, Derek Smith, John Nettleton, Nancie Jackson, Roger Mutton, Paul Angelis, Raymond Armstrong, Joby Blanshard, Roy Pearce	11 Mar 1968	Lost
5	19	The Fall of Kelvin Walker	Alasdair Gray	Michael Bakewell	John Robins	Harry H. Corbett, Corin Redgrave, Judy Cornwell, John Phillips, Peter Copley, Ronald Adam, Alan Shallcross, Roy Evans, Peter Pratt, Michael Hawkins, Aubrey Morris	22 Apr 1968	Lost
5	20	The Fanatics	Stellio Lorenzi (L'Affaire Calas); Max Marquis (adaptation)	Michael Bakewell	Rudolph Cartier	Alan Badel, Leonard Rossiter, Rosalie Crutchley, John Paul, Alex Scott, Cyril Shaps, Tom Criddle, Richard Caldicot, Hamilton Dyce, Bernard Hepton, Gordon Faith, Michael Mundell, Edwin Finn, Robert James, Royston Tickner, Milton Reid	29 Apr 1968	Colour 35mm telerecording
5	21	Home, Sweet Honeycomb	Bernard Kops	Michael Bakewell	Alan Gibson	Michael Crawford, Maurice Denham, John Golightly, Francesca Annis, Doris Hare, Brian Wilde, Laurie Asprey, Pamela Pitchford, Faith Curtis, Roger Jones, Antony Webb	13 May 1968	Lost
5	22	The Pistol Shot	Alexander Pushkin (short story); Nicholas Bethell (adaptation)	Michael Bakewell	John Gibson	John Ronane, Peter Jeffrey, Ann Bell, Ilona Rodgers, Michael Bilton, Peter Marinker, Philip Bond, Wesley Murphy, John Hollis, David Bowie, Andrew Robertson	20 May 1968	Lost
5	23	Life Class	Malcolm Quantrill	Michael Bakewell	John Tydeman	Susan George, Richard Cornish, Edwin Richfield, Joe Melia, Norman Wynne, Janet Burnell, Claire Davenport, Peter Pratt, Marion Mathie, Wilfred Carter, James Cairncross	27 May 1968	Lost
5	24	All's Well That Ends Well	William Shakespeare (play), adapted by John Barton	Ronald Travers	Claude Whatham (for the BBC) and John Barton (for the RSC)	Ian Richardson, Lynn Farleigh, Catherine Lacey, Sebastian Shaw, Brewster Mason	3 Jun 1968	Only the first hour survives, on 625-line VT (held by BFI)
5	25	Wind Versus Polygamy	Obi Egbuna (play)	Michael Bakewell	Naomi Capon	Earl Cameron, Gordon Jackson, Louisa Sherman, Lionel Ngakane, Charles Hyatt, Rudolph Walker, Willie Jonah, Clifton Jones, Elroy Josephs	15 Jul 1968	Lost
5	26	The Year of the Sex Olympics	Nigel Kneale	Ronald Travers	Michael Elliott	Leonard Rossiter, Suzanne Neve, Tony Vogel, Brian Cox, Vickery Turner, George Murcell, Martin Potter, Lesley Roach, Hira Talfrey, Patricia Maynard, Derek Fowlds, Wolfe Morris	29 Jul 1968	16mm tr
5	27	Mille Miglia	Athol Fugard	Ronald Travers	Robin Midgley	Michael Bryant, Ronald Lacey, Guy Deghy, George Roubicek, Douglas Ditta, Donald Burton, Fabio Galvano	5 Aug 1968	Colour 625-line vt
