= Play of the Month =

British television anthology series

- Opening title, 1975
- Genre: Drama Anthology/Classic adaptations
- Country of origin: United Kingdom
- Original language: English (some translations)
- No. of series: 16
- No. of episodes: 128 (inc. 11 repeats under this title; 40 missing)

Production
- Producers: Peter Luke (1965-66), Cedric Messina (1966-77), others
- Camera setup: multi-camera/film inserts
- Production company: BBC

Original release
- Network: BBC 1
- Release: 19 October 1965 – 12 September 1983

Related
- Theatre Night

Play of the Month is a BBC television anthology series, which ran from 1965 to 1983 featuring productions of classic and contemporary stage plays (or adaptations) which were usually broadcast on BBC1. Each production featured a different work, often using prominent British stage actors in the leading roles. The series was transmitted regularly from October 1965 to May 1979, before returning for the summer seasons of 1982 and 1983. The producer most associated with the Play of the Month series was Cedric Messina. Thirteen productions were also shown previously or subsequently on BBC2 in the period 1971-73 under Stage 2. Productions were broadcast in colour from November 1969.

== Archive status ==
Of the 128 productions, 40 are missing from the archives (except for short sequences in several cases), having been junked in the 1960s and 1970s. One colour production exists only as a black & white telerecording.

4/9 episodes from series one are archived, only the first episode from series two is archived, 2/11 from series three are archived, with one lost transmission surviving in partial footage, 4/9 from series four are archived, 4/8 from series five are fully archived, with one lost broadcast having partial footage, 5/9 from series six are archived, 8/11 from series seven are archived, with one episode ("The Cherry Orchard"), originally transmitted on 19 December 1971 and filmed in colour only surviving as a black and white recording, 7/10 from series eight are archived, and one lost episode having partial footage, 7/9 exist from series nine, with one lost episode having partial footage, 8/9 from series ten are archived, and every episode made from series eleven onwards is archived.

The earliest episode not in the BBC archives is series one episode three, "The Joel Brand Story", originally transmitted on 14 December 1965, and the latest episode not available in the archives is series ten episode eight "The Shadow of a Gunman", originally transmitted on 20 April 1975.

== Productions ==
Sourced according to the BBC Genome archive of Radio Times magazines, with archival status from TV Brain.
Legend: AS/A = Archive status/Availability
Abbreviations: tr =Telerecording; seq = sequence(s)

UK Transmission date	Title	Author	Producer	Director	Performers (non-exhaustive)	Notes	AS/A
Series One
19 Oct 1965	Luther	John Osborne	Cedric Messina	Alan Cooke	Alec McCowen, Patrick Magee, Geoffrey Bayldon, Ray Barrett, Jerold Wells, Philip Stone, Fulton Mackay, James Cairncross, Douglas Ditta, Peter Purves, Rex Robinson	Adapted from the play.	Survives
16 Nov 1965	A Passage to India	E. M. Forster (novel); Santha Rama Rau (play); John Maynard (adaptation)	Peter Luke	Waris Hussein	Sybil Thorndike, Virginia McKenna, Zia Mohyeddin, Cyril Cusack; Ishaq Bux, Saeed Jaffrey, John Bryans, Doreen Mantle	Adapted from the play of the novel. Repeated on BBC2 29 Jun 1992.	Survives
14 Dec 1965	The Joel Brand Story	Heinar Kipphardt, based on the book by Alex Weissberg; adapted from German by Rudolph Cartier	Peter Luke	Rudolph Cartier	Cyril Shaps, Zia Mohyeddin, Anton Diffring, Martin Benson, Michael Godfrey, Harold Goldblatt, Pat Gorman, Gertan Klauber, Tutte Lemkow, Peter Howell	Adapted from the book.	Lost
18 Jan 1966	Gordon of Khartoum	Robin Maugham (play); David Benedictus (adaptation)	Peter Luke	Rudolph Cartier	Alan Badel, Charles Carson, John Franklyn-Robbins, Gladys Spencer, Cyril Shaps, Roy Stewart	Adapted from the play The Last Hero.	Lost
15 Feb 1966	Where Angels Fear to Tread	E. M. Forster (novel); Elizabeth Hart (adaptation)	Cedric Messina	Naomi Capon	Anna Massey, Wendy Hiller, Alec McCowen, Nora Swinburne, André Lawrence	Adapted from the novel.	Lost
15 Mar 1966	Lee Oswald - Assassin	Felix Lützkendorf (play); Rudolph Cartier & Reed De Rouen (adaptation)	Peter Luke	Rudolph Cartier	Tony Bill, Dora Reisser, Robert Ayres, John Alderson, Donald Sutherland, Callen Angelo, David Bauer, Glenn Beck, Reed De Rouen, Harold Goldblatt, David Graham, David Healy, Paul Maxwell, Warren Mitchell, Shane Rimmer, Tony Sibbald	Adapted from the play.	Survives
12 Apr 1966	Make Me an Offer	Wolf Mankowitz (book); David Heneker & Monty Norman (m/ly)	Cedric Messina	Bill Hays	Diana Coupland, Peter Gilmore, Judith Bruce, Meier Tzelniker, James Grout, Ivor Salter, Patrick O'Connell, Timothy Bateson	Adapted from the novel.	Lost
24 May 1966	Death of a Salesman	Arthur Miller	Cedric Messina	Alan Cooke	Rod Steiger, Betsy Blair, Joss Ackland, Tony Bill, Kenneth J. Warren, David Healy	Adapted from the play.	Lost
28 Jun 1966	The Devil's Eggshell	David Weir, based on an idea by Alex Comfort.	Cedric Messina	Gareth Davies	Leonard Rossiter, Keith Barron, David Langton, John Phillips, Nicholas Pennell, Bernard Hepton, Burt Kwouk, Michael Culver, Stephanie Bidmead, Anthony Jacobs, Basil Moss, Peter Copley, Godfrey James		Survives
Series Two
27 Sep 1966	Defection! The Case of Colonel Petrov	Donald Bull, based on the book by Michael Bialoguski.	Cedric Messina	Bill Hays	Nigel Stock, Lee Montague, Charles Tingwell, Jerome Willis, Colin Jeavons, James Bree, Willoughby Gray, George Roubicek, George Pastell, Walter Sparrow, Peter van Dissel	Based on the book The Petrov Story.	Survives
25 Oct 1966	Days to Come	H. G. Wells (story); Ken Taylor (adaptation)	Cedric Messina	Alan Bridges	Dinsdale Landen, Judi Dench, Bernard Archard, John Quentin, Michael Gough, Alan Rowe, Michael Brennan, Norman Mitchell, Richard Coe, Peter Birrel, Yvonne Antrobus, John Caesar, Geoffrey Cheshire, Martin King, Rex Robinson	Adapted from the novella.	Lost
22 Nov 1966	Corridors of Power	C. P. Snow (novel); adapted by John Elliot	Cedric Messina	Raymond Menmuir	Patrick Allen, Alec Clunes, William Mervyn, Sarah Lawson; Joseph Fürst, Tenniel Evans, John Tate, Martin Friend, Donald Pickering, Kenneth Waller, Michael Guest, Morris Perry, Andrew Lodge, Eric Elliott, Peter Thompson	Adapted from the novel.	Lost
20 Dec 1966	The Making of Jericho	Alun Owen	Cedric Messina	Bill Hays	John Thaw, Neville Smith, Pauline Collins, Peter Jeffrey, Wendy Richard, Donald Gee, John Scott Martin, Reg Lever, Geoffrey Hughes		Lost
14 Mar 1967	The Cabinet Papers	Maurice Edelman (book); Anthony Steven (adaptation)	Cedric Messina	Waris Hussein	Maxine Audley, Griffith Jones, Richard Leech, Gerald Sim, Richard Vernon, Llewellyn Rees, David Garth, John Bryans, Iréna Mayeska, Alan Haywood, John Baker	Adapted from the book.	Lost
Series Three
15 Oct 1967	Girls in Uniform	Christa Winsloe (play); Barbara Burnham (translation); Derek Ingrey (adaptation)	Cedric Messina	Waris Hussein	Virginia McKenna, Sonia Dresdel, Rachel Kempson, Francesca Annis, Anna Calder-Marshall, Petra Markham, Jan Chappell, Sally Faulkner, Stephanie Bidmead	Adapted from the play/film. Repeated 6 Jul 1969.	Lost
12 Nov 1967	The Moon and Sixpence	W. Somerset Maugham (novel); Clive Exton (adaptation)	Cedric Messina	Donald McWhinnie	Charles Gray, Ronald Hines, Barry Justice, Sylvia Kay, Elisabeth Welch	Adapted from the novel.	Lost
3 Dec 1967	Romeo and Juliet	William Shakespeare	Cedric Messina	Alan Cooke	Hywel Bennett, Kika Markham, John Gielgud, Thora Hird, Michael Gambon, Ronald Pickup, Charles Kay, Edward Burnham, Stephanie Bidmead, Brian Badcoe, David Griffin, Michael Godfrey, Derrick Gilbert	Adapted from the play.	Survives
21 Jan 1968	The Parachute	David Mercer	Tony Garnett	Anthony Page	Alan Badel, Jill Bennett, John Osborne, Isabel Dean, Esmond Knight, Barry Jackson, Norman Jones, Royston Farrell, Stephen Whittaker, Drewe Henley, John J. Carney	Repeated as The Wednesday Play 6 Aug 1969, on BBC2 1 Sep 1976 and 29 Nov 1980, and on BBC1 23 Jun 1988.	Survives
11 Feb 1968	Cyrano de Bergerac	Edmond Rostand, translated by Brian Hooker	Cedric Messina	James MacTaggart	Eric Porter, Peter Jeffrey, Suzanne Neve, Simon Brent, Jerome Willis, Harold Innocent, Michael Godfrey, Gertan Klauber, Joseph Greig, Steve Peters	Adapted from the play.	Lost
17 Mar 1968	Ghosts	Henrik Ibsen, translated by Michael Meyer	Cedric Messina	Michael Elliott	Celia Johnson, Tom Courtenay, Donald Wolfit, Fulton Mackay, Vickery Turner	Adapted from the play.	Lost
14 Apr 1968	The Corn Is Green	Emlyn Williams (play); Harry Green (adaptation)	Cedric Messina	Philip Dudley	Wendy Hiller, Ronald Fraser, Stephanie Bidmead, Glyn Houston; John Ogwen, Glyn Owen, Mona Bruce	Adapted from the play	Lost
12 May 1968	The Tempest	William Shakespeare	Cedric Messina	Basil Coleman	Michael Redgrave, Keith Michell, Jonathan Dennis, Ronald Pickup, Tessa Wyatt, John Woodvine, Donald Eccles, James Cairncross, Llewellyn Rees	Adapted from the play.	Lost
9 Jun 1968	The Old Ladies	Rodney Ackland (play); Hugh Walpole (source novel)	Cedric Messina	William Slater	Flora Robson, Athene Seyler, Katina Paxinou	Adapted from the play of the novel.	Lost
7 Jul 1968	Man and Superman	George Bernard Shaw	Cedric Messina	James MacTaggart	Eric Porter, Maggie Smith, Adrienne Corri, Rachel Kempson, Cyril Luckham, Angharad Rees, Tony Selby, Godfrey Quigley	Adapted from the play.	seq exist
4 Aug 1968	Hay Fever	Noël Coward	Cedric Messina	John Gorrie	Celia Johnson, Anna Massey, Richard Briers, Dennis Price, Charles Gray, Hazel Hughes, Ian McKellen, Vickery Turner, Lucy Fleming	Adapted from the play. Repeated 3 Aug 1969.	Lost
Series Four
1 Sep 1968	St. Joan	George Bernard Shaw	Cedric Messina	Waris Hussein	Janet Suzman, Hugh Walters, Glyn Owen, Richard Hampton, Murray Melvin, John Bryans, Michael Craig, Maurice Denham, Glyn Owen, Ronald Pickup, Jack Watson, Philip Bond, Jerold Wells	Adapted from the play. Repeated 8 Jun 1969.	Lost
13 Oct 1968	The Male Animal	James Thurber and Elliott Nugent.	Cedric Messina	Alan Bridges	Lee Montague, Anthony Perkins, Toby Robins, Alan Gifford, Jumoke Debayo, Christopher Benjamin	Adapted from the play.	Lost
17 Nov 1968	The Seagull	Anton Chekhov, translated by George Calderon	Cedric Messina	Alan Cooke	Pamela Brown, Robert Stephens, Gemma Jones, Robin Phillips, Niall MacGinnis, Michael Gambon	Adapted from the play. First shown on BBC2 under Theatre 625, 27 Mar 1966.	Survives
24 Dec 1968	Waters of the Moon	N. C. Hunter	Cedric Messina	Herbert Wise	Athene Seyler, Vivien Merchant, Kathleen Harrison, Michael Gwynn, Roland Culver, Margaret Leighton	Adapted from the play.	Lost
12 Jan 1969	Mary, Queen of Scots	Friedrich Schiller, translated by Stephen Spender	Cedric Messina	Basil Coleman	Virginia McKenna, Pamela Brown, Derek Godfrey, Peter Cellier, Fanny Rowe, Walter Fitzgerald, John Harvey, Bernard Hepton, Tony Steedman	Adapted from the play Mary Stuart.	Lost
9 Feb 1969	Maigret at Bay	Georges Simenon (novel); Donald Bull (adaptation)	Cedric Messina	William Slater	Rupert Davies, Helen Shingler, Neville Jason, Gillian Hills, Yootha Joyce, Clive Cazes, Tony Harwood, Geoffrey Morris, Martin Miller, Hans De Vries, Donald Pickering, Murray Evans, Kenneth Benda, Ann Tirard, Geoffrey Cheshire, Robin Scott	Adapted from the novel Maigret se défend.	Survives
2 Mar 1969	Relatively Speaking	Alan Ayckbourn	Cedric Messina	Herbert Wise	Celia Johnson, Donald Sinden, John Stride, Judy Cornwell,	Adapted from the play.	Lost
13 Apr 1969	Julius Caesar	William Shakespeare	Cedric Messina	Alan Bridges	Robert Stephens, Frank Finlay, Maurice Denham, Edward Woodward, Anthony Bate, Alan Rowe, Jon Rollason, John Alderton, John Abineri, Terence De Marney, Christopher Guard, Christopher Timothy, Trevor Martin, Brian Vaughan, Christopher Benjamin, Richard Coe, Christopher Denham, Christopher Timothy, Stuart Wilson, Andrew Johns, Duncan Preston	Adapted from the play. Repeated 5 Jul 1970.	Survives
11 May 1969	An Ideal Husband	Oscar Wilde	Cedric Messina	Rudolph Cartier	Jeremy Brett, Keith Michell, Margaret Leighton, Dinah Sheridan, Susan Hampshire, Penelope Lee, Erik Chitty	Adapted from the play. Repeated 26 Jul 1970.	Survives
Series Five
12 Oct 1969	The Heiress	Ruth and Augustus Goetz, from a novel by Henry James	Cedric Messina	Terence Dudley	Vincent Price, Eileen Atkins, John Stride, Lally Bowers, Shirley Dixon, David Allister	Adapted from the novel Washington Square.	Lost
23 Nov 1969	Charley's Aunt	Brandon Thomas (play); Richard Waring (adaptation)	Cedric Messina	John Gorrie	Danny La Rue, Ronnie Barker, Coral Browne, Dinsdale Landen, John Standing, Robert Coote, Royce Mills, Reginald Barratt, George Giles	Adapted from the play. Co-production between the BBC and Keep Films. Repeated 30 Aug 1970.	Survives
14 Dec 1969	The Marquise	Noël Coward	Cedric Messina	Alan Gibson	Celia Johnson, Philip Latham, Richard Vernon, David Griffin, Ciaran Madden, Nigel Terry, Wensley Pithey	Adapted from the play.	Lost
18 Jan 1970	Three Sisters	Anton Chekhov, translated by Elisaveta Fen	Gerald Savory	Cedric Messina	Eileen Atkins, Janet Suzman, Michele Dotrice, Anthony Hopkins, Sarah Badel, Ronald Hines, Joss Ackland, Donald Pickering, Michael Bryant, Jill Bennett, Erik Chitty, Christopher Timothy	Adapted from the play. Repeated 22 Aug 1971.	Survives
15 Feb 1970	In Good King Charles's Golden Days	George Bernard Shaw	Cedric Messina	Basil Coleman	John Gielgud, Michael Craig, Maurice Denham, Derek Godfrey, Joan Greenwood, Felicity Hain, Barbara Jefford, Corin Redgrave, Joyce Redman, Athene Seyler, Elisabeth Bergner	Adapted from the play. Repeated 25 Jul 1971.	Lost
15 Mar 1970	Separate Tables	Terence Rattigan (play); Hugh Whitemore (adaptation)	Cedric Messina	Alan Cooke	Eric Porter, Annette Crosbie, Geraldine McEwan, Robert Harris, Cathleen Nesbitt, Hazel Hughes	Adapted from the plays.	Survives
19 Apr 1970	Howards End	E. M. Forster, adapted by Pauline MacAulay	Cedric Messina	Donald McWhinnie	Leo Genn, Rachel Kempson, Glenda Jackson, Andrew Ray, Geraldine Sherman, Christopher Gable, Tessa Shaw, Daphne Heard, Mary Healey, John Tordoff, Caroline Hunt	Adapted from the novel. Repeated on BBC2 2 Dec 1970.	seq exist
17 May 1970	The Rivals	Richard Brinsley Sheridan	Cedric Messina	Basil Coleman	Andrew Cruickshank, Beryl Reid, Jeremy Brett, Jennie Linden, John Alderton, T. P. McKenna, Susan Penhaligon, Lynn Farleigh	Adapted from the play.	Survives
Series Six
20 Sep 1970	Macbeth	William Shakespeare	Cedric Messina	John Gorrie	Eric Porter, Janet Suzman, John Thaw, John Woodvine, John Alderton, Michael Goodliffe, Tony Caunter, Sylvia Coleridge, Daphne Heard, Hilary Mason, Geoffrey Palmer, Wolfe Morris, Alan Rowe, Donald Douglas, John Bailey, David Spenser, Leon Eagles, Christopher Guard; Paul Greenhalgh	Adapted from the play. Repeated 20 Jun 1971.	Survives
18 Oct 1970	Ross	Terence Rattigan (play); William Emms (adaptation)	Gerald Savory	Cedric Messina	Ian McKellen, Charles Gray, Barrie Ingham, John Bennett, Martin Jarvis, Edward Fox, Brian Rawlinson, Michael Robbins, David Spenser, Kim Fortune, Hugh Walters, Simon Lack, Robert Luckham, Victor Pemberton, David Griffin, Richard Hampton	Adapted from the play. Repeated on BBC2 under Stage 2, 28 Jul 1971.	Lost
8 Nov 1970	Uncle Vanya	Anton Chekhov, translated by Elisaveta Fen	Cedric Messina	Christopher Morahan	Freddie Jones, Anthony Hopkins, Ann Bell, Roland Culver, Jenifer Armitage, John Baskcomb, Richard Beale, Stacey Tendeter	Adapted from the play. Repeated on BBC2 under Stage 2, 11 Aug 1971.	Survives
24 Dec 1970	Five Finger Exercise	Peter Shaffer	Cedric Messina	John Gorrie	Margaret Lockwood, Paul Rogers, Gary Bond, Sally Thomsett, Timothy Dalton	Adapted from the play.	Lost
3 Jan 1971	Act of Betrayal	Hugh Whitemore	Cedric Messina	William Slater	Zena Walker, Mary Wimbush, Michael Gwynn, Stanley Meadows, Deborah Lavin, Alan MacNaughtan, Gertan Klauber, Nicholas Smith, Jay Neill	Repeated 23 Mar 1972.	Survives
21 Feb 1971	Candida	George Bernard Shaw	Cedric Messina	Alan Cooke	George Baker, Jeremy Bulloch, Timothy Dalton, Geraldine McEwan, Clive Revill	Adapted from the play. Repeated on BBC2 under Stage 2, 14 Jul 1971.	Lost
21 Mar 1971	The Wild Duck	Henrik Ibsen (play); Max Faber (adaptation)	Cedric Messina	Alan Bridges	Denholm Elliott, Derek Godfrey, Mark Dignam, Rosemary Leach, John Robinson, Jenny Agutter, Stephanie Bidmead, Christopher Benjamin, Brian Vaughan	Adapted from the play. Repeated 19 Mar 1972.	Survives
25 Apr 1971	Don Juan in Hell	George Bernard Shaw	Cedric Messina	Basil Coleman	Michael Hordern, Christopher Plummer, Michael Redgrave, Vivien Merchant	Adapted from the play.	Lost
23 May 1971	Platonov	Anton Chekhov, translated by Dmitri Makaroff, adapted by John Elliot	Cedric Messina	Christopher Morahan	Rex Harrison, Patsy Byrne, Siân Phillips, Clive Revill, Donald Eccles, Geoffrey Bayldon, Willoughby Goddard, Stacey Tendeter, John Gill, Kevin Stoney, Neil McCarthy	Adapted from the play. Repeated 8 Mar 1973.	Survives
Series Seven
26 Sep 1971	A Midsummer Night's Dream	William Shakespeare	Cedric Messina	James Cellan Jones	Eileen Atkins, Robert Stephens, Lynn Redgrave, Amanda Barrie, Jeremy Clyde, Edward Fox, Michael Gambon, Eleanor Bron, Ronnie Barker, Paul Henry, John Laurie, Clifford Rose, John Glyn-Jones, Pam Ferris, Ken Parry	Adapted from the play. Repeated on BBC2 7 Aug 1973.	Survives
24 Oct 1971	Rasputin	Ronald Eyre	Cedric Messina	Alan Cooke	Robert Stephens, Peter Barkworth, Isabel Dean, Jonathan Moore, Lally Bowers, T. P. McKenna, Andrew Robertson, Reg Lye, Leonard Trolley, Derrick Gilbert, John Savident, James Bree, Harry Waters	Adapted from the play. Repeated on BBC2 under Stage 2, 17 Oct 1972.	Survives
28 Nov 1971	Tartuffe	Molière (play); Richard Wilbur (translator/adaption)	Cedric Messina	Basil Coleman	Michael Hordern, Michael Craig, John Standing, David Nettheim, Mary Morris, Patricia Routledge	Adapted from the play. Repeated on BBC2 9 Oct 1973.	Lost
19 Dec 1971	The Cherry Orchard	Anton Chekhov, translated by Elisaveta Fen	Gerald Savory	Cedric Messina	Celia Johnson, Edward Woodward, Jenny Agutter, Ray Brooks, Christopher Gable, Gemma Jones, Cyril Shaps, David Spenser, Mary Wimbush	Adapted from the play. Repeated on BBC2 under Stage 2, 24 Oct 1972.	bw 16mm tr only
23 Jan 1972	Summer and Smoke	Tennessee Williams	Cedric Messina	Alvin Rakoff	Lee Remick, David Hedison, Barry Morse, Betsy Blair, Wendy Miller, Bruce Clark	Adapted from the play.	Lost
20 Feb 1972	Stephen D	James Joyce, adapted by Hugh Leonard	Cedric Messina	Donald McWhinnie	Donal McCann, James Aspinall, Pamela Duncan, Martin Dempsey, Pauline Delaney, David Kelly, Aidan Murphy, Brendan Price, Brenda Fricker	Adapted from A Portrait of the Artist as a Young Man and Stephen Hero. Repeated on BBC2 under Stage 2, 31 Oct 1972.	Survives
16 Apr 1972	The Merchant of Venice	William Shakespeare	Gerald Savory	Cedric Messina	Maggie Smith, Frank Finlay, Charles Gray, Christopher Gable, Robert Harris, Malcolm Stoddard, Nerys Hughes, David Spenser, John Moffatt, Alan Tucker, Ken Parry	Adapted from the play.	Survives
14 May 1972	Lady Windermere's Fan	Oscar Wilde	Cedric Messina	Rudolph Cartier	Coral Browne, Judy Geeson, Liza Goddard, Derek Godfrey, Charles Gray, James Villiers, Judy Geeson, Siân Phillips	Adapted from the play.	Lost
11 Jun 1972	The Playboy of the Western World	J.M. Synge	Cedric Messina	Alan Gibson	John Hurt, Sinéad Cusack, Pauline Delaney, Joe Lynch, Kevin Flood, Gerard Murphy	Adapted from the play. First shown on BBC2 under Stage 2, 21 Jul 1971.	Survives
23 Jul 1972	She Stoops to Conquer	Oliver Goldsmith	Cedric Messina	Michael Elliott	Tom Courtenay, Thora Hird, Juliet Mills, Ralph Richardson, Elaine Taylor, Terry Bale, Esmond Knight, Geoffrey Bateman	Adapted from the play. First shown on BBC2 under Stage 2, 4 Aug 1971.	Survives
13 Aug 1972	Trelawny of the 'Wells'	Arthur Wing Pinero	Cedric Messina	Herbert Wise	John Alderton, Graham Crowden, Lally Bowers, Roland Culver, Ian Ogilvy, Anthony Ainley, Lila Kaye, John Dearth, John Cater, Godfrey James, Stephanie Turner, Henry Woolf	Adapted from the play. First shown on BBC2 under Stage 2, 7 Jul 1971.	Survives
Series Eight
15 Sep 1972	The Millionairess	George Bernard Shaw	Cedric Messina	William Slater	Maggie Smith, James Villiers, Peter Barkworth, Charles Gray, Tom Baker, Priscilla Morgan, Avril Angers, John Garrie, Donald Pickering	Adapted from the play. Repeated 13 Jun 1973.	Survives
20 Oct 1972	Hedda Gabler	Henrik Ibsen, translated by Michael Meyer	Cedric Messina	Waris Hussein	Janet Suzman, Ian McKellen, Jane Asher, Brendan Barry, Dorothy Reynolds, Tom Bell	Adapted from the play. Repeated 14 Jul 1974 and on BBC2 5 Nov 1986.	Survives
24 Nov 1972	King Oedipus	Sophocles, translated by E. F. Watling	Cedric Messina	Alan Bridges	Ian Holm, Sheila Allen, Alan Webb, Anthony Bate, Sydney Tafler, George Coulouris, Edward Kelsey, Alan Rowe, Ahmed Khalil, Philip Ryan, Sidney Kean	Adapted from the play Oedipus Rex. Repeated on BBC2 2 Jul 1974.	Survives
20 Dec 1972	The Magistrate	Arthur Wing Pinero	Cedric Messina	Bill Hays	Michael Hordern, Geraldine McEwan, Peter Firth, Leonard Rossiter, Anna Calder-Marshall, Barrie Ingham, Jan Francis, Dudley Jones	Adapted from the play. Repeated 9 Jun 1974.	Lost
7 Jan 1973	The Adventures of Don Quixote	Miguel de Cervantes (novel); Hugh Whitemore (adaptation)	Gerald Savory	Alvin Rakoff	Rex Harrison, Frank Finlay, Rosemary Leach, Bernard Hepton, Ronald Lacey, Roger Delgado, Robert Eddison, Paul Whitsun-Jones, John Hollis, Walter Sparrow	Adapted from the novel. Co-production between the BBC and Universal Pictures Television.	Survives
16 Feb 1973	Candide	Voltaire, translated and adapted by James MacTaggart	Cedric Messina	James MacTaggart	Frank Finlay, Ian Ogilvy, Emrys James, Clifton Jones, Angela Richards, Kathleen Helme, Leonard Maguire, Jerome Willis, John Woodnutt, Johnnie Wade	Adapted from the novel. Repeated on BBC2 19 Mar 1974.	Survives
15 Apr 1973	A Room with a View	E. M. Forster (novel); Pauline MacAulay (adaptation)	Cedric Messina	Donald McWhinnie	Judy Geeson, Charles Gray, Tom Chadbon, John Sharp, Robert Coote, Lally Bowers, Michael Guest	Adapted from the novel. Repeated on BBC2 16 Jul 1974.	seq exist
16 May 1973	The Caucasian Chalk Circle	Bertolt Brecht, translated by Eric Bentley	Cedric Messina	Bill Hays	Leo McKern, Sara Kestelman, Fanny Carby, Donald Gee, Peter Halliday, Terrence Hardiman, Bernard Hepton, Peter Jeffrey, Patrick Magee, Declan Mulholland, James Mellor, Edmund Pegge, Robert Powell, John Thaw, Linda Thorson	Adapted from the play.	Lost
18 Jul 1973	The Duchess of Malfi	John Webster	Cedric Messina	James MacTaggart	Eileen Atkins, Michael Bryant, Charles Kay, T. P. McKenna, Gary Bond, Jerome Willis, Michael Godfrey, Robert James, Roy Evans, Michael Lynch, Talfryn Thomas, Tim Curry, Nick Brimble, Jack Galloway, Dallas Cavell, Peter Spraggon	Adapted from the play. First shown on BBC2 under Stage 2, 10 Oct 1972.	Survives
22 Aug 1973	Peer Gynt	Henrik Ibsen, English version by Norman Ginsbury	Cedric Messina	Alan Cooke	Colin Blakely, Wendy Hiller, Francesca Annis, Ray Barrett, Aubrey Morris, Lois Baxter, Dudley Foster, John Franklyn-Robbins, Terence Bayler, Helen Blatch, Claire Davenport, Elroy Josephs, Andrew Lane, Mark McManus	Adapted from the play. First shown on BBC2 under Stage 2, 26 Sep 1972.	Survives
Series Nine
16 Sep 1973	The Love-Girl and the Innocent	Aleksandr Solzhenitsyn, translated by Nicholas Bethell and David Burg	Cedric Messina	Alan Clarke	David Leland, Gabrielle Lloyd, Richard Durden, Patrick Stewart, Allan Surtees, Barry Jackson, John Kane, Alan Gerrard, Forbes Collins, Reg Pritchard, Eric Mason, Edwin Finn, John Herrington, George Cormack, Trevor Lawrence, Carl Forgione, Brian Grellis	Adapted from the play. Repeated 11 Aug 1974.	Survives
21 Oct 1973	The Common	Peter Nichols	Cedric Messina	Christopher Morahan	Vivien Merchant, Peter Jeffrey, Dennis Waterman, Gwen Taylor, Shelagh Fraser, Trevor Baxter, Tony Sibbald	Repeated 8 Jun 1975.	Survives
18 Nov 1973	The Recruiting Officer	George Farquhar	Cedric Messina	David Giles	Ian McKellen, Prunella Ransome, Jane Asher, Brian Blessed, Bryan Marshall, John Moffatt, John Welsh, John Flint, Charles Gray, Eileen Helsby, Mitzi McKenzie, Graham Weston	Adapted from the play.	seq exist
16 Dec 1973	Pygmalion	George Bernard Shaw	Christopher Morahan	Cedric Messina	James Villiers, Lynn Redgrave, Ronald Fraser, Emrys James, Lally Bowers, Angela Baddeley, Jon Rollason, Sheila Grant, John Cannon	Adapted from the play.	Survives
20 Jan 1974	The Changeling	Thomas Middleton & William Rowley	Cedric Messina	Anthony Page	Stanley Baker, Helen Mirren, Brian Cox, Alan Webb, T.P. McKenna, Frances Tomelty, Tony Selby, Susan Penhaligon, Christopher Saul	Adapted from the play.	Survives
17 Feb 1974	The Importance of Being Earnest	Oscar Wilde	Cedric Messina	James MacTaggart	Michael Jayston, Julian Holloway, Gemma Jones, Celia Bannerman, Coral Browne, Lally Bowers, Richard Pearson, Arthur Hewlett	Adapted from the play.	Survives
17 Mar 1974	The Deep Blue Sea	Terence Rattigan	Cedric Messina	Rudolph Cartier	Virginia McKenna, Peter Egan, Stephen Murray, Vladek Sheybal, Joseph Blatchley, John Moffatt, Jon Croft	Adapted from the play. Repeated 27 Jul 1975.	Lost
21 Apr 1974	Mrs Warren's Profession	George Bernard Shaw	Cedric Messina	Herbert Wise	Coral Browne, Penelope Wilton, Robert Powell, James Grout, Richard Pearson	Adapted from the play. First shown on BBC2 under Stage 2, 3 Oct 1972.	Survives
19 May 1974	The Skin Game	John Galsworthy	Cedric Messina	William Slater	Paul Rogers, Barbara Jefford, Bernard Lee, Judy Geeson, John Collin, Kate Nicholls, Simon MacCorkindale, David Garfield, Edward Evans	Adapted from the play.	Survives
Series Ten
8 Sep 1974	The Linden Tree	J. B. Priestley	Cedric Messina	Moira Armstrong	Andrew Cruikshank, Margaret Tyzack, Gary Bond, Joanna Van Gyseghem, Marilyn Taylerson, Simon Lack, Michael Craze	Adapted from the play. Repeated 15 Aug 1976.	Survives
24 Oct 1974	Electra	Sophocles, translated by E. F. Watling	Cedric Messina	Michael Lindsay-Hogg	Eileen Atkins, Rosalie Crutchley, Julian Glover, Derek Godfrey, Georgina Hale, Susan Richards, Martin Shaw	Adapted from the play. Repeated on BBC2 15 Sep 1976.	Survives
17 Nov 1974	The Wood Demon	Anton Chekhov, translated by Ronald Hingley	Cedric Messina	Donald McWhinnie	Ian Holm, Francesca Annis; Ronald Hines, Ronald Fraser, Donal McCann, Angela Pleasence, Cyril Luckham, Geoffrey Bayldon, Vickery Turner, Daphne Heard, Jay Neill	Adapted from the play.	Survives
27 Nov 1974	Robinson Crusoe	Daniel Defoe (novel); James MacTaggart (adaptation)	Cedric Messina	James MacTaggart	Stanley Baker, Ram John Holder, Jerome Willis	Adapted from the novel.	Survives
19 Jan 1975	The Apple Cart	George Bernard Shaw	Alan Shallcross	Cedric Messina	Nigel Davenport, Helen Mirren, Peter Barkworth, Bill Fraser, Trevor Baxter, Beryl Reid, Reg Pritchard, Simon Lack	Adapted from the play.	Survives
16 Feb 1975	The School for Scandal	Richard Brinsley Sheridan	Cedric Messina	Stuart Burge	Jeremy Brett, Pauline Collins, Edward Fox, Bernard Lee, Arthur Lowe, Andrew Robertson, Colin Jeavons, Russell Hunter, John Rhys-Davies, Richard Kane, David Kincaid, Willie Shearer	Adapted from the play.	Survives
23 Mar 1975	King Lear	William Shakespeare	Cedric Messina	Jonathan Miller	Michael Hordern, Sarah Badel, Angela Down, Donald Gee, Michael Jayston, Frank Middlemass, Anthony Nicholls, Ronald Pickup, Penelope Wilton, Benjamin Whitrow, Glen Murphy, David Neal, Alec Sabin, David Kincaid, Terry Wright	Adapted from the play. Repeated on BBC2 9 Mar 1977.	Survives
20 Apr 1975	The Shadow of a Gunman	Sean O'Casey	Cedric Messina	Alvin Rakoff	Hilary Minster, Mark Moss, Phyllis McMahon, Isolde Cazelet, Michael O'Donoughue, Keith Steven	Adapted from the play. First shown on BBC2 under Stage 2, 25 Sep 1973.	Lost
18 May 1975	Strife	John Galsworthy	Cedric Messina	James Cellan Jones	Colin Blakely, Clifford Evans, Angela Down, Nerys Hughes, Trevor Cooper, John Bennett, Mostyn Evans, Hayden Jones, John Ogwen, Aubrey Richards, Clifford Rose, Hugh Walters, George Waring	Adapted from the play.	Survives
Series Eleven
28 Sep 1975	Chips with Everything	Arnold Wesker	Cedric Messina	Waris Hussein	David Daker, Lloyd McGuire, Terence Budd, Tim Woodward, Karl Johnson, Donald Hewlett, David Troughton, Terry Bale, Leslie Schofield	Adapted from the play.	Survives
2 Nov 1975	The Little Minister	J. M. Barrie	Alan Shallcross	Cedric Messina	Ian Ogilvy, Helen Mirren, Peter Barkworth, Bill Simpson, Anne Kristen, Nicholas Jones, David Bailie, John Moffatt, Simon Lack, Robert James	Adapted from the play.	Survives
14 Dec 1975	Love's Labour's Lost	William Shakespeare	Cedric Messina	Basil Coleman	Martin Shaw, David Gwillim, Martin C. Thurley, Jeremy Brett, James Berwick, Terence Budd, Maurice Denham, Andrew Harding, Victoria Plucknett, Lorna Heilbron, Clifford Rose, Jan Francis, Tony Haygarth, Hugh Ross, David Bailie	Adapted from the play.	Survives
29 Dec 1975	When We Are Married	J. B. Priestley	Cedric Messina	David Giles	Stuart Wilson, John Stratton, Beryl Reid, Eric Porter, Patricia Routledge, Richard Pearson, Thora Hird, Mel Martin, Kenneth Waller, Ronnie Barker, Sheila Reid	Adapted from the play.	Survives
25 Jan 1976	Trilby	George du Maurier (novel); Hugh Whitemore (adaptation)	Cedric Messina	Piers Haggard	Alan Badel, Sinéad Cusack, Stuart Fox, Michael Anthony, Rosalie Crutchley, Bruce Purchase, Chris Gannon	Adapted from the novel. Repeated on BBC2 14 Sep 1977.	Survives
29 Feb 1976	Loyalties	John Galsworthy	Cedric Messina	Rudolph Cartier	Edward Fox, Charles Gray, Polly Adams, John Carson, Peter Dyneley, Dinah Sheridan, Erik Chitty, Roger Hammond, Pat Gorman, Andrew Lane, Steve Plytas, Geoffrey Palmer	Adapted from the play.	Survives
18 Apr 1976	The Chester Mystery Plays	Maurice Hussey (adaptation)	Cedric Messina	Piers Haggard	Tom Courtenay, Michael Hordern, Alun Armstrong, Hilda Braid, Keith Chegwin, Kenneth Colley, Paul Copley, Christopher Guard, Brian Glover, Tony Haygarth, David Jackson, Kevin McNally, John Normington, Terry Scully, Nina Thomas, Raymond Westwell	Adapted from the cycle of Chester Mystery Plays. Repeated 7 Aug - 11 Sep 1977.	Survives
16 May 1976	French Without Tears	Terence Rattigan	Cedric Messina	John Gorrie	Nigel Havers, David Robb, Anthony Andrews, Barbara Kellerman; Vernon Dobtcheff, Michael Gambon, Nicola Pagett	Adapted from the play.	Survives
Series Twelve
19 Sep 1976	The Picture of Dorian Gray	Oscar Wilde; John Osborne (play adaptation)	Cedric Messina	John Gorrie	John Gielgud, Peter Firth, Mark Dignam, Jeremy Brett, Nan Munro, Gwen Ffrangcon-Davies, Michael Barrington, Judi Bowker, Nicholas Ball, Lawrence Davidson, Reginald Barratt, Paul Greenhalgh	Adapted from the novel.	Survives
10 Oct 1976	London Assurance	Dion Boucicault (play); Gerald Savory (adaptation)	Cedric Messina	Ronald Wilson	Anthony Andrews, Judy Cornwell, Jan Francis, Charles Gray, Dinsdale Landen, Clifford Rose, Nigel Stock, James Bree, George Raistrick, Nat Pearn	Adapted from the play.	Survives
21 Nov 1976	Look Back in Anger	John Osborne	Cedric Messina	John Glenister	James Hazeldine, Ciaran Madden, Neil Daglish, Chrissy Iddon, Thorley Walters	Adapted from the play.	Survives
16 Jan 1977	The Winslow Boy	Terence Rattigan	Cedric Messina	David Giles	Jonathan Scott-Taylor, Simon Chandler, Ann Beach, Eric Porter, Diana Fairfax; Michele Dotrice, Kenneth Waller	Adapted from the play. Repeated on BBC2 10 May 1978.	Survives
13 Feb 1977	The Country Wife	William Wycherley	Cedric Messina	Donald McWhinnie	Helen Mirren, Bernard Cribbins, Anthony Andrews, Amanda Barrie, Adrienne Corri, Ciaran Madden, John Nettleton, Michael Cochrane, Phil Daniels	Adapted from the play.	Survives
13 Mar 1977	The Ambassadors	Henry James, dramatised by Denis Constanduros	Cedric Messina	James Cellan Jones	Paul Scofield, Lee Remick, Delphine Seyrig, David Huffman, Gayle Hunnicutt, Don Fellows, William Hootkins	Adapted from the novel.	Survives
19 May 1977	Heartbreak House	George Bernard Shaw	Alan Shallcross	Cedric Messina	John Gielgud, Siân Phillips, Barbara Murray, Daniel Massey, Lesley-Anne Down, David Waller, Donald Pickering, Barry Jackson	Adapted from the play.	Survives
Series Thirteen
30 Oct 1977	You Never Can Tell	George Bernard Shaw	David Jones	James Cellan Jones	Robert Powell, Kika Markham, Ernest Clark, Warren Clarke, Cyril Cusack, Patrick Magee, Judy Parfitt, Kate Nicholls	Adapted from the play.	Survives
4 Dec 1977	Waste	Harley Granville-Barker	David Jones	Don Taylor	Paul Daneman, Hannah Gordon, Joyce Carey, Heather Chasen, Annette Crosbie, Robert Lang, André Morell, Stephen Murray, Donald Pickering, Alan Rowe, Michael Cashman	Adapted from the play.	Survives
15 Jan 1978	Flint	David Mercer	David Jones	Peter Wood	John Le Mesurier, Julie Covington, Peter Bowles, Dandy Nichols, Beryl Reid, Philip Stone, John Bailey	Adapted from the play.	Survives
5 Feb 1978	The Seagull	Anton Chekhov, translated by Ronald Hingley	David Jones	Michael Lindsay-Hogg	Anthony Bate, Zoe Caldwell, Michael Gambon, Georgina Hale, Stephen Rea, Julia Schofield, Alan Webb, John Kane, Allan Surtees	Adapted from the play.	Survives
5 Mar 1978	The Sea	Edward Bond	David Jones	Jane Howell	Judy Campbell, Mark Dignam, Victor Spinetti	Adapted from the play.	Survives
2 Apr 1978	The Beaux' Stratagem	George Farquhar	James Cellan Jones	David Jones	Brenda Bruce, Tom Conti, Estelle Kohler, Ian Ogilvy, David Waller, Julie Peasgood, Jay Neill, Zoë Wanamaker, Malcolm Terris, Tony Haygarth, Freddie Jones, Souad Faress, Norman Rodway, Ray Callaghan	Adapted from the play.	Survives
23 Apr 1978	Danton's Death	Georg Büchner (play); Alan Clarke & Stuart Griffiths (adaptation)	David Jones	Alan Clarke	Norman Rodway, Ian Richardson, Peter Gordon, Katherine Fahey, Felicity Gibson, Don Henderson, Michael Bilton, Nigel Lambert, Michael Pennington, John Woodnutt, Zoë Wanamaker	Adapted from the play.	Survives
Series Fourteen
26 Nov 1978	Kean	Jean-Paul Sartre, translated by Frank Hauser.	David Jones	James Cellan Jones	Anthony Hopkins, Neville Phillips; Sara Kestelman, Adrienne Corri, Barrie Ingham, Robert Stephens, Frank Middlemass, Cherie Lunghi, Hugh Walters, George Tovey, Harry Fielder	Adapted from Sartre's play about Edmund Kean.	Survives
14 Jan 1979	Marya	Isaac Babel, translated by Michael Glenny and Harold Shckman, adapted by Christopher Hampton	David Jones	Jack Gold	Trevor Peacock, Paddy Joyce, Clive Revill, Niall Padden, Michael Byrne, Lisa Harrow, Paul Rogers, Susan Tracy, Paul Freeman	Adapted from the play.	Survives
4 Feb 1979	The Voysey Inheritance	Harley Granville-Barker	David Jones	Robert Knights	Jeremy Irons, Brewster Mason, Jeremy Child, Julie Covington, Dulcie Gray, Barbara Leigh-Hunt	Adapted from the play.	Survives
4 Mar 1979	Hello and Goodbye	Athol Fugard	Louis Marks	Claude Whatham	Yvonne Bryceland, Bill Flynn	Adapted from the play.	Survives
8 Apr 1979	The Wings of the Dove	Henry James (novel); Denis Constanduros (adaptation)	Alan Shallcross	John Gorrie	Elizabeth Spriggs, Betsy Blair, John Castle, Suzanne Bertish, Lisa Eichhorn, Rupert Frazer, Alan Rowe, Gino Melvazzi	Adapted from the novel.	Survives
6 May 1979	Design for Living	Noël Coward	Louis Marks	Philip Saville	Rula Lenska, Clive Arrindell, John Steiner, John Bluthal, Dandy Nichols	Adapted from the play.	Survives
1 Jul 1979	The Kitchen	Arnold Wesker	Ann Kirch	Alvin Rakoff	Peter Egan	Adapted from the play. First shown on BBC2 under Play of the Week, 2 Nov 1977.	Survives
Series Fifteen
24 May 1982	I Have Been Here Before	J. B. Priestley	Louis Marks	James Ormerod	Herbert Lom, Anthony Valentine, Lorna Heilbron, Leslie Sands, James Griffiths	Adapted from the play.	Survives
21 Jun 1982	On Approval	Frederick Lonsdale	Cedric Messina	David Giles	Penelope Keith, Jeremy Brett, Lindsay Duncan, Benjamin Whitrow	Adapted from the play. First shown 27 Dec 1980.	Survives
19 Jul 1982	Little Eyolf	Henrik Ibsen, translated by Michael Meyer	Louis Marks	Michael Darlow	Anthony Hopkins, Diana Rigg, Peggy Ashcroft, Emma Piper, Charles Dance, Timothy Stark	Adapted from the play.	Survives
23 Aug 1982	The Critic	Richard Brinsley Sheridan (play); Don Taylor (additional dialogue)	Louis Marks	Don Taylor	John Gielgud, Hywel Bennett, Nigel Hawthorne, Rosemary Leach, Norman Rodway, Alan Badel, Anna Massey, Rodney Bewes, Christopher Biggins	Adapted from the play.	Survives
20 Sep 1982	The White Guard	Mikhail Bulgakov, translated by Michael Glenny	Louis Marks	Don Taylor	Michael Pennington, Laura Davenport, Nigel Havers, Charles Keating, John Shrapnel, Charles Kay, Gordon Gostelow, Michael Graham Cox, Michael N. Harbour, Martin Clunes, Glen Murphy, John Ringham, Oliver Smith, Walter Sparrow, John Abineri, Andrew Burt, Geoffrey Beevers	Adapted from the novel.	Survives
Series Sixteen
22 May 1983	Dangerous Corner	J. B. Priestley	Cedric Messina	James Ormerod	Anthony Valentine, Sarah Badel, David Robb, Judi Bowker, Daniel Day-Lewis, Elvi Hale, Susan Fleetwood	Adapted from the play.	Survives
13 Jun 1983	The Gay Lord Quex	Arthur Wing Pinero	Louis Marks	Claude Whatham	Hannah Gordon, Evelyn Laye, Rosalind Ayres, Julian Holloway, Lucy Gutteridge, Anton Rodgers, Geraldine Alexander	Adapted from the play.	Survives
11 Jul 1983	The Misanthrope	Molière	Louis Marks	Michael Simpson	Ian Holm, Cherie Lunghi, Nigel Hawthorne, Annette Crosbie, Michael Kitchen	Adapted from the play. First shown on BBC1 under Festival, 27 Jan 1980.	Survives
12 Sep 1983	Infidelities	Pierre de Marivaux, translated by David Cohen	Louis Marks	Michael Darlow	Charlotte Rampling, Robin Askwith, Victor Spinetti, James Aubrey, Leonie Mellinger	Adapted from the play Double Inconstancy	Survives

== See also ==
Other BBC drama anthology series include:

- Theatre 625
- The Wednesday Play
- Thirty-Minute Theatre
- Play for Today
- Play for Tomorrow
- The Play on One
- Stage 2
- BBC2 Playhouse
- Screen One
- Screen Two
- ScreenPlay
- Second City Firsts
- Thursday Theatre
