= Stage 2 =

- Genre: Drama, anthology, television plays
- Written by: Various
- Directed by: Various
- Country of origin: United Kingdom
- Original language: English
- No. of seasons: 3
- No. of episodes: 13 (3 missing)

Production
- Producer: Cedric Messina
- Running time: 85-120 minutes
- Production company: BBC

Original release
- Network: BBC 2
- Release: 7 July 1971 – 25 September 1973

Stage 2 is a British television anthology series produced by the BBC. Thirteen episodes aired on BBC2 under Stage 2 billing from 1971 to 1973. They were all productions of classic plays shown previously or subsequently on BBC1 under Play of the Month. Only Mrs. Warren's Profession is currently available on DVD.

== Productions ==
Sourced according to the BBC Genome Project archive of Radio Times magazines, with archival status from TV Brain.

| Original UK transmission date | Title | Author(s) | Producer | Director | Performers (non-exhaustive) | Notes | Archive status |
Season One
| 7 July 1971 | Trelawny of the 'Wells' | Arthur W. Pinero | Cedric Messina | Herbert Wise | John Alderton, Lally Bowers, Graham Crowden, Roland Culver, Rachel Kempson, Ian Ogilvy, Moira Redmond, Elizabeth Seal, Elaine Taylor, Graham Crowden, Anthony Ainley, John Cater, John Dearth, Godfrey James, Lila Kaye, Stephanie Turner, Henry Woolf | Adapted from the play. Repeated on BBC1 13 Aug 1972 under Play of the Month. | Survives |
| 14 July 1971 | Candida | Bernard Shaw | Cedric Messina | Alan Cooke | Geraldine McEwan, George Baker, Timothy Dalton, Jeremy Bulloch, Clive Revill, Priscilla Morgan | Adapted from the play. First shown on BBC1 under Play of the Month. | Missing |
| 21 July 1971 | The Playboy of the Western World | J.M. Synge | Cedric Messina | Alan Gibson | John Hurt, Sinéad Cusack, Pauline Delany, Joe Lynch, Kevin Flood, James Caffrey, Gerard Murphy | Adapted from the play. Repeated on BBC1 11 June 1972 under Play of the Month. | Survives |
| 28 July 1971 | Ross | Terence Rattigan, adapted for television by William Emms | Gerald Savory | Cedric Messina | Ian McKellen, Charles Gray, Barrie Ingham, John Bennett, Martin Jarvis, Edward Fox, Brian Rawlinson, Michael Robbins, David Spenser, Hugh Walters, Simon Lack, Robert Luckham, Victor Pemberton, David Griffin, Richard Hampton | Adapted from the play. First shown on BBC1 under Play of the Month. | Missing |
| 4 August 1971 | She Stoops to Conquer | Oliver Goldsmith | Cedric Messina | Michael Elliott | Tom Courtenay, Thora Hird, Juliet Mills, Ralph Richardson, Elaine Taylor, Terry Bale, Esmond Knight, Geoffrey Bateman | Adapted from the play. Repeated on BBC1 23 July 1972 under Play of the Month. | Survives |
| 11 August 1971 | Uncle Vanya | Anton Chekhov, translated by Elisaveta Fen | Cedric Messina | Christopher Morahan | Freddie Jones, Anthony Hopkins, Ann Bell, Roland Culver, John Baskcomb, Richard Beale, Stacey Tendeter | Adapted from the play. First shown on BBC1 under Play of the Month. | Survives |
Season Two
| 26 September 1972 | Peer Gynt | Henrik Ibsen, English version by Norman Ginsbury | Cedric Messina | Alan Cooke | Colin Blakely, Wendy Hiller, Francesca Annis, Ray Barrett, Aubrey Morris, Lois Baxter, Dudley Foster, John Franklyn-Robbins, Terence Bayler, Helen Blatch, Claire Davenport, Elroy Josephs, Andrew Lane, Mark McManus | Adapted from the play. Repeated on BBC1 22 August 1973 under Play of the Month. | Survives |
| 3 October 1972 | Mrs Warren's Profession | Bernard Shaw | Cedric Messina | Herbert Wise | Coral Browne, Penelope Wilton, James Grout, Derek Godfrey, Robert Powell, Richard Pearson | Adapted from the play. Repeated on BBC1 21 April 1974 under Play of the Month. | Survives |
| 10 October 1972 | The Duchess of Malfi | John Webster | Cedric Messina | James MacTaggart | Eileen Atkins, Michael Bryant, Charles Kay, T. P. McKenna, Gary Bond, Tim Curry, Jerome Willis, Michael Godfrey, Robert James, Roy Evans, Michael Lynch, Jack Galloway, Dallas Cavell, Peter Spraggon, Talfryn Thomas, Nick Brimble | Adapted from the play. Repeated on BBC1 18 July 1973 under Play of the Month. | Survives |
| 17 October 1972 | Rasputin | Ronald Eyre | Cedric Messina | Alan Cooke | Robert Stephens, Peter Barkworth, Isabel Dean, Lally Bowers, T. P. McKenna, Robert Eddison, Andrew Robertson, Reg Lye, Leonard Trolley, Harry Waters, Derrick Gilbert, John Savident, James Bree | Adapted from the play. First shown on BBC1 under Play of the Month. | Survives |
| 24 October 1972 | The Cherry Orchard | Anton Chekhov, translated by Elisaveta Fen | Gerald Savory | Cedric Messina | Jenny Agutter, Ray Brooks, Laurence Carter, Christopher Gable, Charles Gray, Celia Johnson, Cyril Shaps, David Spenser, Mary Wimbush, Edward Woodward | Adapted from the play. First shown on BBC1 under Play of the Month. | 16mm b&w print |
| 31 October 1972 | Stephen D | James Joyce, adapted by Hugh Leonard | Cedric Messina | Donald McWhinnie | Donal McCann, David Kelly, Aidan Murphy, Brendan Price, Brenda Fricker | Adapted from Joyce's A Portrait of the Artist as a Young Man and Stephen Hero. First shown on BBC1 under Play of the Month. | Survives |
Season Three
| 25 September 1973 | The Shadow of a Gunman | Sean O'Casey | Cedric Messina | Alvin Rakoff | Hilary Minster, Mark Moss, Phyllis McMahon, Isolde Cazelet, Michael O'Donoughue, Keith Steven | Adapted from the play. Repeated on BBC1 20 April 1975 under Play of the Month. | Missing |

== See also ==
Other BBC drama anthology series include

- Play of the Month
- Theatre 625
- Second City Firsts
- BBC2 Playhouse
- Screen Two
- Thirty-Minute Theatre
- Thursday Theatre
