= Theatre Night =

- Genre: Stage drama
- Country of origin: United Kingdom
- Original language: English (including translations)
- No. of series: 5
- No. of episodes: 28

Production
- Production company: BBC (some co-productions)

Original release
- Network: BBC 2
- Release: 15 September 1985 – 21 July 1990

Related
- Play of the Month; Performance

Theatre Night is the umbrella title under which adaptations of classic and contemporary stage plays were usually broadcast on BBC 2 between 15 September 1985 and 21 July 1990.

== List of episodes ==
The main source for compiling this list was the BFI Film and TV Database. The website's master list is here. IMDb was also used, but some significant errors were found; these are noted.

Legend: Se = Season; Ep = Episode

| Se | Ep | Title | Author | Producer/ Director | Performers | UK Transmission date |
|---|---|---|---|---|---|---|
| 1 | 1 | Lady Windermere's Fan | Oscar Wilde | Louis Marks (p); Tony Smith (d) | Helena Little, Tim Woodward, Stephanie Turner, Kenneth Cranham, James Saxon, Geoff Morrell | 15 September 1985 |
| 1 | 2 | The Father | August Strindberg | Louis Marks (p); Kenneth Ives (d) | Colin Blakely, Dorothy Tutin, Irene Handl, Edward Fox, Robert Lang | 22 September 1985 |
| 1 | 3 | Absent Friends | Alan Ayckbourn | Shaun Sutton (p); Michael Simpson (d) | Tom Courtenay, Julia McKenzie, Dinsdale Landen, Hywel Bennett, Maureen Lipman | 29 September 1985 |
| 1 | 4 | Thunder Rock | Robert Ardrey | Louis Marks (p); Mike Vardy (d) | Charles Dance, Anna Massey, Paul Copley, Kathleen Byron, David de Keyser, Garrick Hagon, Graham Crowden, Burnell Tucker | 6 October 1985 |
| 1 | 5 | Playboy of the West Indies | J. M. Synge (play The Playboy of the Western World); Mustapha Matura (adaptation) | Alan Shallcross (p); Nicolas Kent (d) | Joan Ann Maynard, Rudolph Walker, Jim Findley, Ram John Holder, Stefan Kalipha, Frank Singuineau | 13 October 1985 |
| 1 | 6 | Trelawny of the 'Wells' | Arthur Wing Pinero | Louis Marks & Cedric Messina (p); Tom Kingdom (d) | Michael Hordern, Nicholas Jones, Avril Angers, Samantha Bond, Patricia Brake, Philip Locke, Vivian Pickles, Linda Polan, Arthur Cox | 20 October 1985 |
| 1 | 7 | Molière | Mikhail Bulgakov (play); Dusty Hughes (adaptation) | Cedric Messina (p); Bill Alexander (d) | Antony Sher, David Bradley, Penelope Beaumont, Sylvia Coleridge, David Troughton, Christopher Bowen | 27 October 1985 |
| 1 | 8 | Tartuffe | Molière (play); Christopher Hampton (translation) | Cedric Messina (p); Bill Alexander (d) | Antony Sher, Nigel Hawthorne, Alison Steadman, Sylvia Coleridge, David Bradley, Ian Talbot, Stephanie Fayerman | 3 November 1985 |
| 2 | 1 | The Devil's Disciple | George Bernard Shaw | Shaun Sutton (p); David Jones (d) | Mike Gwilym, Ian Richardson, Elizabeth Spriggs, Patrick Stewart, Patrick Newell, John Cater, Patrick Godfrey, Larry Lamb, Benjamin Whitrow | 17 May 1987 |
| 2 | 2 | What the Butler Saw | Joe Orton | Shaun Sutton (p); Barry Davis (d) | Dinsdale Landen, Tessa Peake-Jones, Timothy West, Prunella Scales | 24 May 1987 |
| 2 | 3 | Miss Julie | August Strindberg | Shaun Sutton (p); Michael Simpson (d) | Janet McTeer, Patrick Malahide | 31 May 1987 |
| 2 | 4 | Make and Break | Michael Frayn | Shaun Sutton (p); Michael Darlow | Robert Hardy, Judi Dench, David Graham, Martin Jarvis, Wolf Kahler, Arnold Lee | 7 June 1987 |
| 2 | 5 | Ghosts | Henrik Ibsen | Louis Marks (p); Elijah Moshinsky (d) | Judi Dench, Kenneth Branagh, Michael Gambon, Freddie Jones, Natasha Richardson | 14 June 1987 |
| 2 | 6 | The Birthday Party | Harold Pinter | Rosemary Hill (p); Kenneth Ives (d) | Joan Plowright, Harold Pinter, Kenneth Cranham, Colin Blakely, Julie Walters, Robert Lang | 21 June 1987 |
| 3 | 1 | The Miser | Molière | Shaun Sutton (p); Michael Simpson (d) | Nigel Hawthorne, Jim Broadbent, Kate Buffery, Janet Suzman, Christopher Benjamin, Ron Cook, John Gill, Simon Sutton, Cyril Shaps | 1 April 1988 |
| 3 | 2 | The Master Builder | Henrik Ibsen | Shaun Sutton (p); Michael Darlow (d) | Leo McKern, Jane Lapotaire, Sebastian Shaw, Miranda Richardson, Simon Rouse | 15 May 1988 |
| 3 | 3 | The Importance of Being Earnest | Oscar Wilde | Shaun Sutton (p); Stuart Burge (d) | Paul McGann, Rupert Frazer, Amanda Redman, Natalie Ogle, Gemma Jones, Alec McCowen, Joan Plowright, John Woodnutt, Peter Copley | 29 May 1988 |
| 3 | 4 | The Rivals | Richard Brinsley Sheridan | Shaun Sutton (p); Elijah Moshinsky (d) | Donald Sinden, Sheila Hancock, Michael Maloney; Patrick Ryecart, Amanda Redman, Ronald Pickup, Suzanne Burden | 5 June 1988 |
| 3 | 5 | Strife | John Galsworthy | Shaun Sutton (p); Michael Darlow (d) | Peter Vaughan, Timothy West, Kate Buffery, Anna Calder-Marshall, Tenniel Evans, Andrew Burt, Trevor Cooper; Bernard Archard, John Nettleton, John Woodnutt, Patsy Smart | 12 June 1988 |
| 4 | 1 | Arms and the Man | George Bernard Shaw | Shaun Sutton (p); James Cellan Jones (d) | Helena Bonham Carter, Kika Markham, Pip Torrens, Dinsdale Landen, Patsy Kensit, Nicolas Chagrin | 16 April 1989 |
| 4 | 2 | The Contractor | David Storey | Shaun Sutton (p); Barry Davis (d) | Timothy West, Kenneth Cranham, Jimmy Jewel, Roger Lloyd-Pack, Gawn Grainger | 23 April 1989 |
| 4 | 3 | The Winslow Boy | Terence Rattigan | Shaun Sutton (p); Michael Darlow (d) | Rosemary Leach, Gordon Jackson, Gwen Watford, Emma Thompson, Ian Richardson, David Troughton | 30 April 1989 |
| 4 | 4 | Knuckle | David Hare | Tim Ironside-Wood (p); Colin Ludlowe (p); Paul Marcus (p); Moira Armstrong (d) | Tim Roth, Emma Thompson, Bernard Hepton, Peter Hawkins, James Appleby, John Joyce | 7 May 1989 |
| 4 | 5 | Metamorphosis | Franz Kafka (short story); Steven Berkoff (adaptation) | Martyn Auty (p); Jim Goddard (d) | Tim Roth, Steven Berkoff, Linda Marlowe, Saskia Reeves, Gary Olsen | 21 May 1989 |
| 4 | 6 | Benefactors | Michael Frayn | No producer credited; Barry Davis (d) | Barbara Flynn, Michael Kitchen, Alan Rickman, Harriet Walter, Howard Cooke | 28 May 1989 |
| 5 | 1 | Othello | William Shakespeare | Greg Smith (p); Trevor Nunn (d) | Willard White, Ian McKellen, Imogen Stubbs, Zoë Wanamaker, Sean Baker, Michael Grandage, Clive Swift | 23 June 1990 |
| 5 | 2 | Bingo: Scenes of Money and Death | Edward Bond | Tim Ironside-Wood (p); Don Taylor (d) | David Suchet, Kenneth Haigh, Peter Jeffrey, Brenda Bruce | 30 June 1990 |
| 5 | 3 | Pentecost | Stewart Parker (writer); Lesley Bruce (adaptation) | No producer credited; Nicholas Kent (d) | Dearbhla Molloy, Adrian Dunbar, Barbara Adair, Michelle Fairley, Sam Dale | 14 July 1990 |
| 5 | 4 | Iphigenia at Aulis | Euripides | Louis Marks (p); Don Taylor | Roy Marsden, Fiona Shaw, Imogen Boorman, Eric Allan, Tim Woodward, Jason Durr, Tessa Peake-Jones | 21 July 1990 |
