= The Three Sisters (Play of the Month) =

- Play of the Month episode
- DVD cover
- Directed by: Cedric Messina
- Written by: Moura Budberg
- Based on: Three Sisters by Anton Chekhov
- Original air date: January 18, 1970

"The Three Sisters" is a television play episode of the BBC One anthology television series Play of the Month based on the 1901 play of the same name by Anton Chekhov. It features Eileen Atkins, Janet Suzman and Anthony Hopkins, This version was directed by Cedric Messina.

== Cast ==
- Eileen Atkins as Olga
- Janet Suzman as Masha
- Michele Dotrice as Irina
- Anthony Hopkins as Andrei

== See also ==
- Three Sisters (1970 film), another British version from 1970
- Three Sisters (1994 film), a Russian 1994 version originally titled Tri sestry
