= Tony Vogel =

English actor (1942–2015)

- Tony Vogel
- Born: Antony Leslie Vogel; 29 June 1942; London, England
- Died: 27 July 2015 (aged 73); Normandy, France
- Occupation: Actor

Antony Leslie Vogel (29 June 1942 – 27 July 2015) was an English actor. He played Andrew in the mini-series of Franco Zeffirelli's Jesus of Nazareth (1977), Aquila in A.D. Anno Domini (1985) and the title role in the 1979 television adaptation of Dick Barton.

He graduated from RADA in 1963 and died of asthma complications at his Normandy holiday home in France on 27 July 2015. The actor was 73 and was cremated.

== TV and filmography ==
Year	Title	Role	Notes
1968	Theatre 625	Nat Mender	TV series – The Year of the Sex Olympics
1968	Resurrection	Nikolai – Dmitri	TV mini-series
1968	Isadora	Raymond Duncan	
1969	Oh! What a Lovely War	German Soldier	Uncredited
1970	Paul Temple	Piet	TV series – Games People Play
1970	A Family at War	A German Soldier	TV series – A Lesson in War
1971	The Last Valley	Tub	
1971	A Town Called Bastard	Man	Uncredited
1971	Deathwork	Snake	
1971	Jason King	Enzio	TV series – All That Glisters: Parts 1 & 2
1972	Full House	Council workman	TV series – Episode dated 9 December 1972
1976	The New Avengers	Ivan	TV series – Three Handed Game
1977	Jesus of Nazareth	Andrew	TV mini-series – Part 1 & 2
1977	The XYY Man	Detective	TV series – Now We Are Dead
1978	Life of Shakespeare	Blount	TV mini-series – Rebellion's Masterpiece
1978	The Professionals	Frank	TV series - Kidnapper 1 – First Night
1978	Return of the Saint	Diskette	TV series – Yesterday's Hero
1979	Dick Barton - Special Agent	Dick Barton	TV series – Title role - all 32 episodes
1979	Meetings with Remarkable Men	Monk	One of the three monks in the scene with Father Giovanni.
1979	S.O.S. Titanic	2nd Officer Jimmy Basset - Carpathia	TV movie, Uncredited
1979	The Human Factor	Matthew Connolly	
1980	Black Angel	Sir Maddox	Short
1980	The Day Christ Died	First Temple Guard	TV movie
1981	Omen III: The Final Conflict	Brother Antonio	
1981	Raiders of the Lost Ark	Tall Captain	
1982–1983	Marco Polo	Matteo Polo	TV mini-series
1983	Hearts and Armour	Ferraù	
1984	Remington Steele	Michael Banks	TV series – Puzzled Steele
1985	A.D.	Aquila – Parts1,2,3,4 & 5	
1985	Mussolini: The Untold Story	Tarabella	TV mini-series
1987	Cry Freedom	2nd Roadblock policeman	
1988	Down There in the Jungle		
1989	Crossbow: The Movie		video
1989	Minder	Det. Sgt. Bradshaw	TV series – The Last Video Show
1989	The Ruth Rendell Mysteries	Roy Carroll	TV series – The Veiled One
1990	Una vita scellerata	Baccio Bandinelli	
1990	A Season of Giants	Bramante	TV movie
1990	Blue dolphin - l'avventura continua	Zio Gerry	
1991	The Storyteller: Greek Myths	Diktys	TV series – Perseus & the Gorgon
1992	Lovejoy	Barney Waddock	TV series – Friends in High Places
1992	Waterland	Stan Booth	
1993	The Baby of Mâcon	The Father	
1994	Anna Lee	Alan Lucas	TV series – Dupe
1994	Kabloonak	Skipper Bill	
1995	Braveheart	Lord Hamilton	
1996	Mission: Impossible	M.I.5	
1997	Peak Practice	Freddie Fairburn	TV series – A Change of Heart
1997	The Odyssey	Eumaeus	TV movie
1998	Les Misérables	Lombard	
1999	Jesus	Farmer	TV movie
2000	The 10th Kingdom	Boatman	TV mini-series – Episode #1.4
2000	Esther Kahn	Dodo, Trish's husband	
2001	The Emperor's New Clothes	British sergeant	
2004	Miracle	Team West Germany	
2007	Silk	Café Verdun Man #1	(final film role)
