= The Possessed (TV series) =

1969 British television serial

- Genre: Drama
- Based on: Demons by Fyodor Dostoevsky
- Screenplay by: Hugh Leonard
- Directed by: Naomi Capon
- Starring: Keith Bell; James Caffrey; David Collings
- Country of origin: United Kingdom
- Original language: English
- No. of episodes: 6

Production
- Producer: David Conroy
- Production company: BBC

Original release
- Network: BBC2
- Release: 25 January – 1 March 1969

The Possessed is a 1969 British drama television serial, produced by the BBC and based on the novel Demons by Fyodor Dostoevsky. It was directed by Naomi Capon from a screenplay by Hugh Leonard and stars Keith Bell, James Caffrey and David Collings. The story takes place in a mid-19th century Russian provincial town and follows its middle-class liberals upon the arrival of a man determined to instigate a revolution.

BBC2 aired The Possessed in six parts from 25 January to 1 March 1969. It was shown in the United States as part of the Masterpiece Theatre programme on PBS.

Raymond Williams praised Collings' acting but criticised the serial for lacking the passionate beliefs that define the original novel, calling this a recurring problem in English adaptations of Russian literature. Williams described the BBC adaptation as "interesting, quiet, domestic; its ideas angular and idiosyncratic rather than passionate and common".

== Cast ==
- Keith Bell as Nikolay Stavrogin
- James Caffrey as Shatov
- David Collings as Pyotr Verhovensky
- Rosalie Crutchley as Varvara Stavrogin
- Laurence Hardy as narrator
- Joan Hickson as Madame Drosdov
- Joseph O'Conor as Stepan Verhovensky
- Anne Stallybrass as Dasha
