= Strife (play) =

1909 play by John Galsworthy

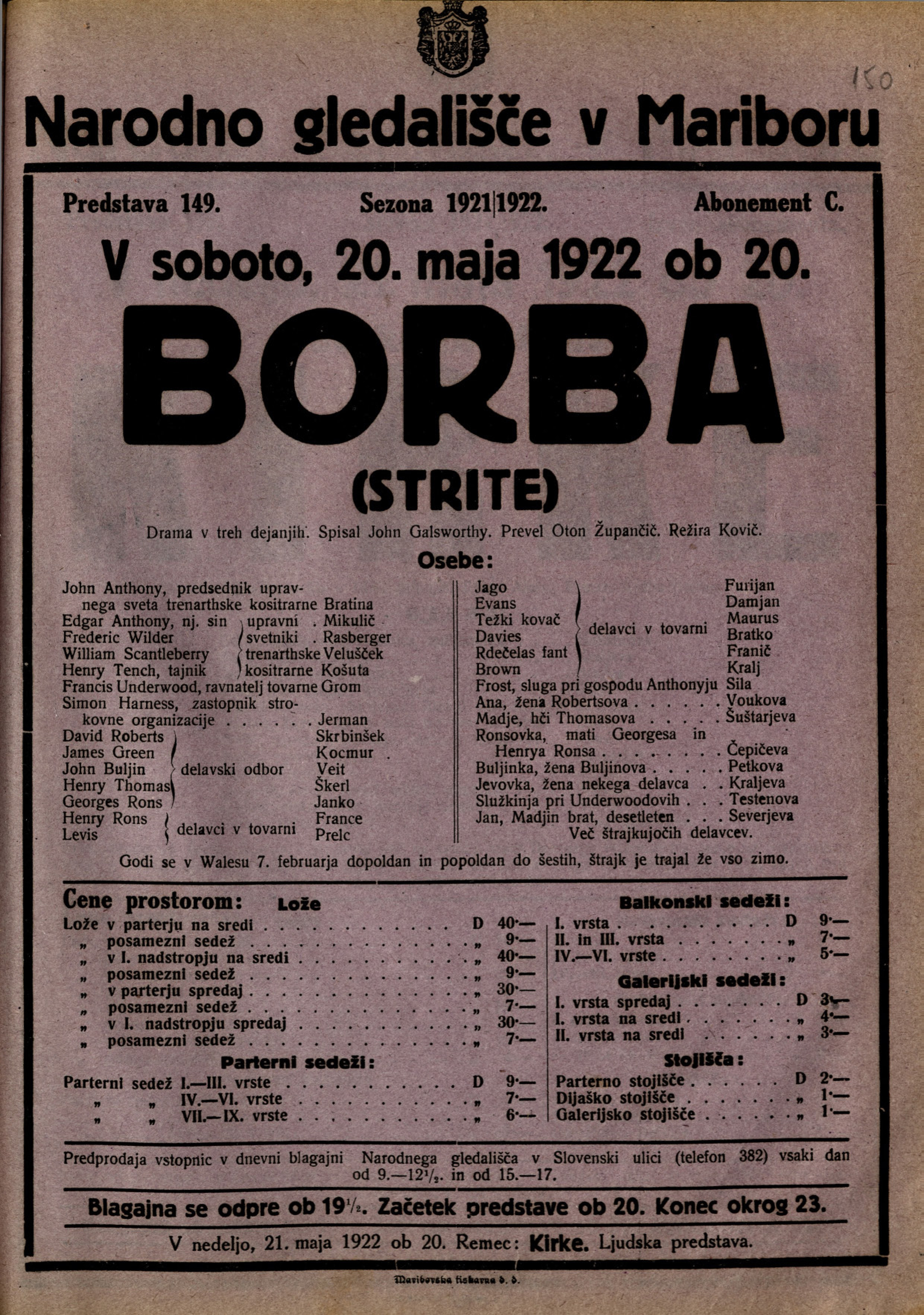

Strife is a three-act play by the English writer John Galsworthy. It was his third play, and the most successful of the three. It was produced in 1909 in London at the Duke of York's Theatre, and in New York at the New Theatre. In the play, there is a prolonged unofficial strike at a factory; as the trade union and the company directors attempt to resolve the affair, which is causing hardship among the workers' families, there is a confrontation between the company chairman and the leader of the strike.

== History ==
Strife was Galsworthy's third play, after The Silver Box (1906), which was successful, and Joy (1907), which failed. He wrote it in a few months in 1907, and sent the manuscript to friends for comment, including Edward Garnett and Joseph Conrad. After being refused by several theatre managers, a successful production in Manchester led to its production in London by Charles Frohman at the Duke of York's Theatre, opening on 9 March 1909 for the first of six matinee performances. It was well received, and the play was transferred to the Haymarket Theatre, then to the Adelphi Theatre, for evening performances. It attracted much attention. A reviewer in The Times wrote: "When an artist of Mr. Galsworthy's high endeavour, mental equipment and technical skill writes a play like Strife, he has done much more than write a play, he has rendered a public service".

In New York it opened at the New Theatre on 17 November 1909. It was one of the first plays produced at this theatre, which had opened on 6 November.

== Synopsis ==
The action takes place on 7 February at the Trenartha Tin Plate Works, on the borders of England and Wales. For several months there has been a strike at the factory.

=== Act I ===
The directors, concerned about the damage to the company, hold a board meeting at the home of the manager of the works. Simon Harness, representing the trade union that has withdrawn support for the strike, tells them he will make the men withdraw their excessive demands, and the directors should agree to the union's demands. David Roberts, leader of the Men's Committee, tells them he wants the strike to continue until their demands are met, although the men are starving. It is a confrontation between the elderly company chairman John Anthony and Roberts, and neither gives way.

After the meeting, Enid Underwood, daughter of John Anthony and wife of the manager, talks to her father: she is aware of the suffering of the families. Roberts' wife Annie used to be her maid. She is also worried about the strain of the affair on her father. Henry Tench, company secretary, tells Anthony he may be outvoted by the Board.

=== Act II, Scene I ===
Enid visits the Roberts' cottage, and talks to Annie Roberts, who has a heart condition. When David Roberts comes in, Enid tells him there must be a compromise, and that he should have more pity on his wife; he does not change his position, and he is unmoved by his wife's concern for the families of the strikers. Enid leaves disappointed.

=== Act II, Scene II ===
In an open space near the factory, a platform has been improvised and Harness, in a speech to the strikers, says they have been ill-advised and they should cut their demands, instead of starving; they should support the Union, who will support them. There are short speeches from two men, who have contrasting opinions. Roberts goes to the platform and, in a long speech, says that the fight is against Capital, "a white-faced, stony-hearted monster". "Ye have got it on its knees; are ye to give up at the last minute to save your miserable bodies pain?"

When news is brought that his wife has died, Roberts leaves and the meeting peters out.

=== Act III ===
In the home of the manager, Enid talks with Edgar Anthony; he is the chairman's son and one of the directors. She is less sympathetic now towards the men, and, concerned about their father, says Edgar should support him. However Edgar's sympathies are with the men. They receive the news that Mrs Roberts has died.

The directors' meeting, already bad-tempered, is affected by the news. Edgar says he would rather resign than go on starving women; the other directors react badly to an opinion put so frankly. John Anthony makes a long speech: insisting they should not give in to the men, he says "There is only one way of treating 'men' — with the iron hand. This half-and-half business... has brought all this upon us.... Yield one demand, and they will make it six...."

He puts to the board the motion that the dispute should be placed in the hands of Harness. All the directors are in favour; Anthony alone is not in favour, and he resigns. The Men's Committee, including Roberts, and Harness come in to receive the result. Roberts repeats his resistance, but on being told the outcome, realizes that he and Anthony have both been thrown over. The agreement is what had been proposed before the strike began.

== Television ==
In Britain, the play has been adapted for television:

It was seen in 1965 as an ITV Play of the Week, directed by Howard Baker. It featured John Phillips as John Anthony, Fulton Mackay as David Roberts, Avril Elgar as Annie Roberts, Rachel Herbert as Enid Underwood, Richard Thorp as Edgar Anthony and Derek Smith as Simon Harness.

It was seen in 1975 as a BBC Play of the Month, directed by James Cellan Jones. It featured Clifford Evans as John Anthony, Colin Blakely as David Roberts, Nerys Hughes as Annie Roberts, Angela Down as Enid Underwood, Jeremy Clyde as Edgar Anthony and John Bennett as Simon Harness.

It was seen in 1988 in the BBC series Theatre Night, directed by Michael Darlow. It featured Peter Vaughan as John Anthony, Timothy West as David Roberts, Anna Calder-Marshall as Annie Roberts, Kate Buffery as Enid Underwood, Shaun Scott as Edgar Anthony and Andrew Burt as Simon Harness.

== Revival ==
The play was revived in 2016 at the Minerva Theatre, Chichester, the first notable production in Britain since it was produced by the National Theatre in 1978. It was directed by Bertie Carvel, and featured William Gaunt as John Anthony and Ian Hughes as David Roberts. The production ran from 12 August to 10 September 2016.
