= Ishaq Bux =

Indian actor (1917–2000)

- in The Rocky Horror Picture Show (1975)
- Born: 15 June 1917; Kanpur, India
- Died: 2 September 2000 (aged 83); London, England
- Occupation: Actor
- Years active: 1957–87

Ishaq Bux (15 June 1917 – 2 September 2000) was an Indian actor.

== Career ==
His first screen appearance was in BBC TV's The English Family Robinson, in 1957. On stage, he appeared with the National Theatre Company at the Old Vic in Tony Harrison's Phaedra Britannica in 1975. He is best remembered by his roles as the guest in The Rocky Horror Picture Show (1975), Omar in Raiders of the Lost Ark (1981) and the fakir in Octopussy (1983).

== Death ==
Bux was diagnosed with terminal lung cancer in July 2000 and died in a London hospice on 2 September 2000, aged 83.

== Filmography ==
=== Film ===
- Nine Hours to Rama (1963) - Gardener
- Man in the Middle (1963) - Indian bearer
- Inadmissible Evidence (1968) - Watson's Guest
- Leo the Last (1970) - Supermarket Manager
- The Raging Moon (1971) - Pakistani
- The Horseman (1971) - Amjad Kahn (uncredited)
- The Vault of Horror (1973) - Fakir (segment 3 "This Trick'ill Kill You")
- S*P*Y*S (1974) - Indian Agent (uncredited)
- Barry McKenzie Holds His Own (1974)
- The Rocky Horror Picture Show (1975) - The Transylvanians #4
- Double Exposure (1976) - First Arab
- Carry On Emmannuelle (1978) - Plane passenger (uncredited)
- Raiders of the Lost Ark (1981) - Omar
- Shock Treatment (1981) - DTV audience member (uncredited)
- The Missionary (1982) - Maharajah
- Privates on Parade (1982) - Sikh Doorman
- Octopussy (1983) - Fakir (uncredited)
- A Passage to India (1984) - Selim

=== Television ===
- BBC Sunday Night Theatre (1957-1959) - Ismail / Achmed / Second Bearer
- The Indian Tales of Rudyard Kipling (1964)
- Theatre 625 - The Serang (1965)
- Play of the Month (1965) - Quasim Ali
- Dixon of Dock Green (1968) - Ibrahim
- W. Somerset Maugham (1969) - Old Indian
- ITV Saturday Night Theatre (1969) - Bamjibinarse
- Department S (1969) - Turkish Club Patron
- On the Buses (1970) - Ahmed
- Wicked Women (1970) - Old man
- The Onedin Line (1971) - Man in Bar
- Softly Softly: Task Force (1972) - Panni
- The Regiment (1973) - Nari Dastoor
- Crown Court (1973–1979) - Mr.Patel / Akbar Nawaz Rana / Surinder Singh Sandhu
- Oh, Father! (1973) - Indian
- Six Days of Justice (1973–1975) - Magistrate
- It Ain't Half Hot Mum (1974–1981) - Stationmaster / Fortune-Telling Wallah / Sword Seller / Indian Trader / Garage Owner
- Machinegunner (1976) - Mr. Pradesh
- Rentaghost - Season 3, Episode 1 - Ali Hakim
- Play for Today (1978–1981) - Sheikh / Amina's Father
- Quatermass (1979) - Misru
- The Jewel in the Crown (1984) - Aziz
- Minder (1984) - Elderly Indian Man
- The Singing Detective (1986) TV mini-series - Patient
- The Sign of Four (1987, TV Movie) - Lal Chowder (final appearance)
