= The Appleyards =

British children's TV soap opera (1952–1960)

The Appleyards is a British television soap opera for children, made and transmitted fortnightly by BBC Television across eleven series and one special from October 1952 to April 1957, plus a revival one-off in 1960, mostly from the BBC's Lime Grove Studios. It was initially produced and directed by Naomi Capon.

The series was initially transmitted live on a Thursday afternoon from 4:30 to 5 p.m. with a Sunday repeat, which was the same cast giving a second live performance. From the second series onwards in 1953 it was broadcast on Saturdays. The programme told the story of the home counties family Mr. and Mrs. Appleyard and their four children: John, Janet, Margaret and Tommy. They were usually accompanied by their neighbour and best friend Ronnie Grant.

It was of its time but also a groundbreaking family sitcom, popular with both adults and children alike but particularly the latter who saw it as an embodiment of their own family. The catchy light music signature tune came from the Chappell Record Library and was called "Looking Around" by Colin Smith (real name is Rhys Donald Lloyd Thomas), recorded by conductor Robert Farnon.

A reunion programme, Christmas with the Appleyards, went out at Christmas 1960.

== Archive status ==
Almost all of the programme's episodes were aired live and never recorded. Only one episode (entitled "Family Treat" and originally aired on 29 December 1956) of the entire run of 77 exists in television archives as of 2017, and can be found on YouTube.
