= The Year of the Sex Olympics =

- Theatre 625 episode
- Episode no.: Season 5 Episode 25
- Directed by: Michael Elliott
- Written by: Nigel Kneale
- Original air date: 29 July 1968

"The Year of the Sex Olympics" is a 1968 television play made by the BBC and first broadcast on BBC2 as part of Theatre 625. It stars Leonard Rossiter, Tony Vogel, Suzanne Neve and Brian Cox, and was directed by Michael Elliott. The writer was Nigel Kneale, best known as the creator of Quatermass.

Influenced by concerns about overpopulation, the counterculture of the 1960s, and the societal effects of television, the play depicts a world of the future where a small elite controls the mass media, keeping the lower classes docile by serving them an endless diet of lowest common denominator programmes and pornography. The play concentrates on an idea the programme controllers have for a new programme that will follow the trials and tribulations of a group of people left to fend for themselves on a remote island. In this respect, the play is often cited as having anticipated the craze for reality television.

Kneale had, fourteen years earlier, adapted George Orwell's Nineteen Eighty-Four as a classic and controversial BBC broadcast, and the play reflects much of Kneale's assimilation of Orwell's concern about the power of the media and Kneale's experience of the evolving media industry.

== Plot summary ==
In the future, society is divided between "low-drives" that equate with the labouring classes and "hi-drives" who control the government and media. The low-drives are controlled by a constant broadcast of pornography that the hi-drives are convinced will pacify them, though one hi-drive, Nat Mender (Tony Vogel), believes that the media should be used to educate the low-drives. The accidental death of a protester (Martin Potter) during the Sex Olympics gets a massive audience response and after this, the co-ordinator Ugo Priest (Leonard Rossiter) decides to commission a new programme. In The Live-Life Show, Nat Mender, his partner Deanie (Suzanne Neve), and their daughter Keten (Lesley Roach) are stranded on a remote Scottish island while the low-drive audience watches. Mender's former colleague, Lasar Opie (Brian Cox), feeling that "something's got to happen", decides to spice up the show by introducing a dangerous element to the island, and The Live-Life Show is deemed a triumph.

== Background ==
=== Origins ===
Nigel Kneale was a Manx television playwright who had come to prominence in the 1950s thanks to his adaptation of Orwell's Nineteen Eighty-Four and his three Quatermass serials, all of which had been made by the BBC. Kneale had since become disenchanted with the BBC, mainly because he had received no extra money when it sold the film rights to The Quatermass Experiment, and had turned to freelance writing, producing scripts for Associated Television and for Hammer Films. When approached by the BBC for a script for the BBC2 anthology series Theatre 625, Kneale, still upset over the sale of the film rights to The Quatermass Experiment, turned them down. The Director-General of the BBC, Sir Hugh Greene, intervened and arranged a £3,000 ex gratia payment to Kneale in recognition of the Quatermass success. Kneale accepted a commission from Theatre 625 producer Michael Bakewell on Friday 7 April 1967 for what would become The Year of the Sex Olympics.

Kneale's concept concerned "the world of the future, and a way of keeping the population happy without being active". According to Kneale, the notion for the play came from the "worldwide dread of populations exploding out of all control" leading him to devise a world where pornography hooks the population "on a substitute for sex rather than the real thing and so keeping the population down". Kneale was also influenced by the dropout counterculture of the late 1960s; he later recalled, "I didn't like the Sixties at all because of the whole thing of 'let it all hang out' and let's stop thinking [...] which was the all too frequent theme of the Sixties which I hated". Dissatisfaction with the youth culture of the time was a preoccupation of Kneale's—in the mid-sixties he had worked on The Big, Big, Giggle, an unmade script about a teenage suicide cult, and following The Year of the Sex Olympics he returned to the theme of youth out of control in his 1969 play Bam! Pow! Zapp!, and in the fourth and final Quatermass serial in 1979. Many cultural icons of the youth movement, including members of the Beatles, Pink Floyd, and Monty Python, were fans of Kneale's work. For The Year of the Sex Olympics Kneale extrapolated the possible consequences of the youth movement's desire for freedom from "traditional" cultural inhibitions, asking, as the academic John R. Cook puts it, "In a world of no limits, will the result quickly be apathy if there is nothing anymore to get excited about, nothing precious or illicit to fight for in the teeth of the censor?"

Kneale also sought to make "a comment on television and the idea of the passive audience", depicting a world where the media is controlled by an elite who feed the population with a diet of low-quality programmes and echoing the Orwellian concept of language reduction, where the vocabulary has been eroded through exposure to advertising slogans, mediaspeak and predominantly visual media. He later recalled, "I thought people in those conditions would have very, very, reduced language—they wouldn't be really a verbal society anymore, and I think we're heading towards that. Television is mainly responsible for it, the fact that people are now conditioned to image. The pictures they see on television screens more and more dominate their thinking, as far as people do a lot of thinking, and if you had a verbally reduced society, you would get the kind of language—possibly—that you did get in the play".

=== Production ===
Kneale's script was accepted on 25 October 1967 by Ronald Travers, who had taken over as producer from Michael Bakewell on Theatre 625. Production began in early 1968 with Michael Elliot as director. Elliot initially asked Leo McKern to take on the key role of Co-ordinator Ugo Priest, but with McKern unavailable, he turned to Leonard Rossiter. Writing to Rossiter, offering him the part, Elliot described The Year of the Sex Olympics as "the most important play Nigel Kneale has written since Quatermass". Cast as Lasar Opie was Brian Cox, who would go on to have a distinguished career in film and television.

The Year of the Sex Olympics met with obstruction when the 'Clean-Up TV' campaigner Mary Whitehouse of the National Viewers and Listeners Association obtained a copy of the script and attempted to block the production. Her objections were overruled by Hugh Greene. Location filming for the outdoor scenes set on the island that appears in The Live-Life Show took place on the Isle of Man between 8 and 10 May 1968. A mishap occurred during the shoot when Tony Vogel slipped and broke his wrist. Filming continued at Ealing Film Studios between 13 and 15 May, covering the elements that would be played into the screens on the set during studio recording such as the Sportsex, Artsex and Foodshow programmes as well as the audience reaction shots. The scene where Kin Hodder falls to his death was also shot at Ealing. Following rehearsals, the production moved to BBC Television Centre between 12 and 14 June. Industrial action by BBC electricians interrupted the production, and by the end of the recording session, the final ten minutes of the play remained untaped, leading to a remount on 23 June to complete the outstanding scenes.

BBC2 was the only UK television station broadcasting in colour at the time. The Year of the Sex Olympics presented a production with gaudy sets, costumes, and makeup.

The Year of the Sex Olympics was broadcast at 9:08 pm on BBC2 on Monday 29 July 1968. Appearing on the arts programme Late Night Line Up later that night to discuss the play, Kneale said "You can't write about the future. One can play with the processes that might occur in the future, but one is really always writing about the present because that is what we know. It's largely an image of television as I know it." Sean Day-Lewis, writing in The Daily Telegraph, hailed the programme as a "highly original play written with great force and making as many valid points about the dangers of the future as any science fiction I can remember—including 1984!" The Year of the Sex Olympics was watched by 1.5 million viewers. Audience Research Report indicated that many viewers found the play impenetrable. It was repeated on BBC1 in 1970 with 15 minutes cut from the running time, as part of The Wednesday Play strand.

As often happened in this era, the colour 625 line PAL master videotapes of The Year of the Sex Olympics were wiped sometime after the broadcast; and the play was believed lost until the 1980s, when a 16mm black-and-white telerecording, made for overseas sales to countries not yet broadcasting in colour, was discovered. This copy was released on DVD, with an introduction by film and television historian Kim Newman, a commentary by actor Brian Cox and a copy of the original script, by the British Film Institute in 2003. It was reissued again on DVD by the BFI in April 2020. Despite apparently having chroma dot information on it, the film remained black-and-white without colour recovery.

== Cultural significance ==
One of the first to draw comparisons with The Year of the Sex Olympics and the rise of reality television programmes (soap operas without professional actors), such as Big Brother, Castaway 2000 and Survivor, was journalist Nancy Banks-Smith in a review of the first series of the UK version of Big Brother for The Guardian in 2000; she later expounded upon the theme in 2003, writing that the play "foretold the reality show and, in the scramble for greater sensation, its logical outcome". An admirer, the writer and actor Mark Gatiss, has said that upon seeing Big Brother he yelled at the television, "Don't they know what they're doing? [...] It's The Year of the Sex Olympics! Nigel Kneale was right!" When The Year of the Sex Olympics was repeated on BBC Four on 22 May 2003, Paul Hoggart in The Times noted that "in many respects Kneale was right on the money [...] when you consider that nothing gets contemporary reality show audiences more excited than an emotional train-wreck on live TV".

Although the reality television of The Live-Life Show is the aspect most commentators pick up on, The Year of the Sex Olympics is also a wider satire on sensationalist television and the media in general. Mark Gatiss has noted that the Artsex and Foodshow programmes that also appear in the play "ingeniously depicted the future of lowest common denominator TV". This view is echoed by the writer and critic Kim Newman, who has said that "as an extreme exercise in revolutionary self-criticism on the part of television professionals, who also lampoon their own world of chattering commentators and ratings-chasing sensationalism, the play [...] is a trenchant contribution to a series of debates that is still raging" and has concluded that "Nigel Kneale might be quite justified in shouting, 'I was right! I was right!'"

== See also ==
- Bread and circuses
- Love Island
