= Alan Shallcross =

British television producer

Alan Shallcross (8 June 1932 in Heswall, Cheshire (now Merseyside) – 22 December 2010) was a British television producer

== Early life ==
He was born in Thelwall and attended Calday Grange Grammar School.

He was educated at Exeter College, Oxford, where his contemporaries were Alan Bennett and Russell Harty,

== Career ==
He joined BBC Television initially working as a programme planner. Shifting to programme production he came to know the producer Cedric Messina, responsible for adaptations of classic plays, and worked with him on such anthology series as Play of the Month. Under Messina, Shallcross worked as script editor on the first twelve productions in the BBC Television Shakespeare cycle.

He was the producer of such single plays (in this case with Jack Levin) as Ian Curteis' Churchill and the Generals (1979) and several episodes of the BBC2 Playhouse series. In 1983 he produced To the Lighthouse, an adaptation of Virginia Woolf's novel of the same name. One of his last productions was a serial adaptation of the Oswald Wynd novel The Ginger Tree (1989) co-produced by the BBC, Japanese broadcaster NHK and WGBH Boston from the novel of the same name. Alan Shallcross retired in the late 1990s, moving to Settle in Yorkshire.
