= Basil Coleman =

English producer, director, and actor

- Born: 22 November 1916; Bristol, England
- Died: 19 March 2013 (aged 96); London, England
- Occupations: producer, director, actor

Basil Woore Coleman (22 November 1916 – 19 March 2013) was an English producer, director, and actor. He was a prolific director of opera, stage plays, and television productions, known for his 1977 BBC television adaptation of Anna Karenina and his involvement with the first productions of several operas by Benjamin Britten, including The Turn of the Screw (1954), Gloriana (1953), Billy Budd (1951), and The Little Sweep (1949).

== Early life and education ==
Coleman was born in Bristol on 22 November 1916 to Sydney James Coleman and Mabel Evans. In December 1916, Coleman's parents returned with their newborn son to their home in Salisbury, Rhodesia (now Harare, Zimbabwe). On 23 October 1918, five weeks after the birth of Coleman's brother, Kenneth, Mabel Evans died of Spanish Influenza. When Coleman was three years old, his family was joined by his stepmother, Gwen Givern Chambers, a dedicated pacifist, suffragette, and vegetarian who educated Coleman, his brother, and later his half-sisters Elizabeth and Naomi for much of their early lives.

In 1924, the family moved to Bulawayo, where Coleman's stepmother fostered his ambition to become an actor, producing a number of plays and concerts in which Coleman and his siblings acted. In 1931, aged fifteen, Coleman attended Frensham Heights School in Surrey, along with his brother, then continued his studies at the Central Drama School at the University of London, receiving his Diploma in Dramatic Arts in 1936.

== Career ==
Coleman continued his training as an actor under Esme Church at the Old Vic Company, performing in various productions as part of the 1936–1937 season, including Hamlet, Henry V, Man and Superman, and The Country Wife, and received a letter of recommendation from Church and producer Tyrone Guthrie in 1937. In 1938, on loan from the Old Vic Company, Coleman played the Geoffrey Longman in James Courage's Private History at The Gate Theatre Studio. In February 1939, Coleman joined the Old Vic Company on a tour of Italy, Greece, Malta, Portugal, and Egypt, under the auspices of the British Council.

Upon his return to England, Coleman was a conscientious objector during the Second World War, initially being sent to work on fruit farms in Sussex before being enlisted by Ruth Spalding's Pilgrim Players as an actor to tour churches and village halls performing morality plays.

Coleman then rejoined The Old Vic Company as an actor, whilst also developing as a director with the encouragement of Tyrone Guthrie. After the war, Coleman began directing productions at the Midland Theatre Company, and in 1948, Coleman worked as assistant director to Tyrone Guthrie on composer Benjamin Britten's realisation of The Beggar's Opera with the English Opera Group at the Arts Theatre, Cambridge. This began Coleman's association and friendship with Britten; in 1949, Coleman directed the first production of Britten's Let's Make an Opera! at the Jubilee Hall in Aldeburgh. In 1951, Coleman directed the first production of Britten's Billy Budd at the Royal Opera House, followed by the first production of Britten's Gloriana in 1953. In 1954, Coleman directed the world premiere of Britten's The Turn of the Screw at the Teatro La Fenice, Venice.

From 1954, Coleman began work at the Crest Theatre, Toronto, directing 16 productions overall, including Orson Welles' Marching Song and T.S Eliot's The Confidential Clerk. Coleman continued his international directing work with productions of Britten's A Midsummer Night's Dream at the War Memorial Opera House, San Francisco in 1961 and at Teatro Colón, Buenos Aires, in 1962. After a time directing teleplays for Canada's CBC, he returned to Britain. He directed Britten's Peter Grimes at London's Sadler's Wells Theatre in 1963.

After taking a BBC directing course, Coleman directed a string of television operas, including Britten's Billy Budd in 1966, for which Coleman received a 'Specialised Programme' BAFTA Award. Coleman also directed television films of Puccini's La Bohème in 1966, Tchaikovsky's Eugene Onegin in 1967, Verdi's Otello in 1969 and Falstaff in 1972, and Donizetti's Don Pasquale in 1973. Coleman's television version of Manuel de Falla's La Vida Breve in October 1968 was the first such broadcast in colour.

Initially intended to direct the television production of Peter Grimes, Coleman withdrew from the project due to the composer's insistence that it be filmed at the Snape Maltings Concert Hall rather than BBC Television Centre in London, creating a rift between Coleman and Britten. The two only reconciled in December 1975, a year before Britten's death. Coleman later turned to directing plays and adaptations of literature for television, including the miniseries adaptation of Iris Murdoch's An Unofficial Rose and an adaptation of Ibsen's The Lady from The Sea in 1974.

Between 1968 and 1975, Coleman also directed several BBC plays of the month, and in 1977 he directed a television adaptation of Tolstoy's Anna Karenina, starring Nicola Pagett. In 1978, as part of the BBC Shakespeare series, Coleman directed an adaptation of As You Like It, starring Helen Mirren.

Coleman continued his work directing stage plays and operas, including Francis Durbridge's ...Suddenly at Home in 1971 and The Gentle Hook in 1975. Coleman also directed the premiere of Alun Hoddinott's The Trumpet Major by the Welsh National Opera in 1981, and productions of Shakespeare's King Lear, Dale Wasserman's One Flew Over the Cuckoo's Nest, and Peter Stone's Woman of the Year in Ankara and Bulgaria in 1989–1990.

In his later years, Coleman led masterclasses and directed a number of student productions, including those at The Royal College of Music, Guildhall School, and the Britten-Pears School in Aldeburgh. Coleman died on 19 March 2013, aged 96.

The Basil Coleman Opera Award, funded by his bequest to the Royal College of Music, London, supports young singers while studying at the College. Recipients of the Award have included the countertenor Hugh Cutting and the soprano Henna Mun. Basil Coleman also left a bequest to Britten Pears Arts to support opera productions. The sixtieth anniversary production of Curlew River (2024) was supported by his bequest, and Colin Matthews' first opera, A Visit to Friends (2025) will also be supported by Coleman's legacy.
