= Naomi Capon =

British television director

Naomi Capon (née Mattuck; 17 December 1921 – 10 February 1987) was a British television director and producer.

Capon was born in Amersham, Buckinghamshire and was one of the earliest female drama directors to work in British television. She was first involved with television when she appeared as a guest on a programme in 1941 in the USA, before joining the BBC North American service in 1947. Her credits include The Adventures of Peter Simple (1957), The Possessed (1969) and the award-winning BBC classic serial The Six Wives of Henry VIII (1970). She directed three episodes of the BBC science-fiction anthology series Out of the Unknown. She also worked as a producer, including on the BBC series The Appleyards, which she also directed.

In 1946, Capon married Charles Kenneth Capon, who died in 1988.

Capon's last known television credit dates from 1973. She died in Kensington in 1987.
