= John Baskcomb =

English actor

- Born: John Gordon Baskcomb; 7 February 1916; Purley, Surrey, England
- Died: 29 March 2000 (aged 84); Helston, Cornwall, England
- Occupation: Actor

John Baskcomb (7 February 1916 – 29 March 2000) was an English character actor who made numerous television and film appearances over a 35-year period.

He was the son of the founder of the Bank of England Operatic and Dramatic Society and was educated at Croydon High School for Boys. He then appeared on stage in repertory theatre in Croydon and Henley-on-Thames and in clubs, pantomimes and concert parties.

He made appearances in numerous British television plays and series including; The Forsyte Saga, Doctor Who (Terror of the Autons), The Saint, Softly, Softly and Poldark and he played the role of Cardinal Wolsey in The Six Wives of Henry VIII (1970). His film roles included Oliver! (uncredited), Chitty Chitty Bang Bang (uncredited), Battle of Britain, Dad's Army and Omen III: The Final Conflict.

Probably his most famous role was that of the farm labourer with a pitch fork in "Battle of Britain" with the line "Good afternoon my a**e you boche b*****d. Come on put your hands up!"

== Filmography ==
- No Trees in the Street (1959) - Minor Role (uncredited)
- Oliver! (1968) - Workhouse Governor (uncredited)
- Chitty Chitty Bang Bang (1968) - Castle Chef (uncredited)
- Battle of Britain (1969) - Farmer
- Uncle Vanya (1970) - Telyeghin (Play of the Month)
- Dad's Army (1971) - Mayor
- Zeppelin (1971) - Henderson (uncredited)
- I Want What I Want (1972)
- The Darwin Adventure (1972) - Prof. Draper
- The Stick Up (1977) - Spectator
- Omen III: The Final Conflict (1981) - Diplomat
