= Bill Hays (director) =

British television director

- Born: Bill Hays; 15 March 1938 wingate Co Durham
- Died: 2 March 2006 (aged 67)
- Occupation: television director.
- Spouse: Catherine Schell (1982-2006; his death)

Bill Hays (15 March 1938 – 2 March 2006) was a British television director who is best remembered for the award-winning Orde Wingate and Rock Follies, a BBC adaptation of the Ivan Turgenev play A Month in the Country (1985), The Tale of Beatrix Potter (1982), a biographical drama with Penelope Wilton in the lead, and the television version of the Alex Glasgow/Alan Plater musical play Close the Coalhouse Door (1969), a late entry in The Wednesday Play series now lost.

Hays also directed the second and third series of the LWT secret agent drama Wish Me Luck broadcast in 1989 and 1990. After he retired from directing, he ran a guesthouse, Chambre d'Hôtes Valentin, in central France, with his actress wife Catherine Schell. His health declined over the last few years of his life until his death in March 2006.
