= Carl Forgione =

Scottish-Italian actor (1944–1998)

- Born: Carlo Forgione; 3 May 1944; Dundee, Scotland
- Died: 10 September 1998 (aged 54); Kensington, London, England
- Occupation: actor

Carl Forgione (3 May 1944 – 10 September 1998) was a British actor, best known for his television appearances.

== Life and career ==
Born of Italian immigrant grandparents, Forgione grew up in the Rhondda Valley. He began his career as an extra with the Royal Shakespeare Company before moving into repertory for two years, appearing at Sheffield, Salisbury, Theatre Royal Stratford East and the Everyman Theatre in Liverpool. This was followed by joining Joan Littlewood's Theatre Workshop, performing in a West End production of Mrs. Wilson's Diary where Forgione impersonated David Frost and George Wigg before going on to appear with the Octagon Theatre, Bolton.

He appeared in two Doctor Who serials - Planet of the Spiders in 1974 and Ghost Light in 1989.

Other TV credits include Dixon of Dock Green, Jesus of Nazareth, Blake's 7, Star Cops, Coronation Street, Emmerdale Farm and The House of Eliott.

In the sixties, Forgione founded the Quipi Basement Theatre with David Halliwell and Walter Hall before leaving in the early 1970s with Hall to form their own Basement Theatre, which functioned in various different Soho basements and above ground elsewhere. In 1994, he became a founder member of the Bare Boards Theatre Company.

While performing in The Country Girl at Greenwich Theatre in 1995, Forgione was diagnosed with cancer. He fought the illness for the next three years, dying peacefully at the Royal Marsden Hospital.

== Filmography ==
| Year | Title | Role | Notes |
|---|---|---|---|
| 1973 | Big Zapper | Kono's Boy | |
| 1977 | Jesus of Nazareth | Plotinus | TV Mini-Series |
