= Brian Rawlinson =

British actor (1931–2000)

- Brian Rawlinson playing Robert Onedin in the episode "A Cold Wind Blowing" in the series The Onedin Line
- Born: Brian Rawlinson; 12 November 1931; Stockport, Cheshire, England
- Died: 23 November 2000 (aged 69); Lyme Regis, Dorset, England
- Occupation: Actor
- Years active: 1960–1999

Brian Rawlinson (12 November 1931 – 23 November 2000) was an English actor and writer for films and TV from the 1950s.

Rawlinson was born in Stockport, Cheshire. He appeared in several films (including several in the Carry On series) but was more frequently on television, a regular role being Robert Onedin in the BBC TV serial The Onedin Line. He also played character roles in many other TV programmes such as Coronation Street, The Baron, Z-Cars, Market in Honey Lane, The Bill, Heartbeat, Danger Man, Goodnight Sweetheart and Last of the Summer Wine, in which he played Cyril Gridley, which was his final appearance. He was also a cast regular in the series The Buccaneers, playing Gaff Guernsey.

As a writer, Rawlinson wrote several plays, but was most involved in the mid-1970s BBC serial Churchill's People, an adaptation based on Winston Churchill's book A History of the English-Speaking Peoples. He was later interviewed about his association with the series on TV Hell, a theme night that BBC Two ran in 1992 on bad television programmes.

He died in Lyme Regis, Dorset on 23 November 2000 aged 69.

== Filmography ==
| Year | Title | Role | Notes |
|---|---|---|---|
| 1957 | Dangerous Exile | Dylan Evans | |
| 1958 | Behind the Mask | Mr. Maddox | Uncredited |
| 1959 | Life in Danger | male nurse | |
| 1960 | No Kidding | Will | |
| 1960 | Sword of Sherwood Forest | 1st Falconer | Uncredited |
| 1961 | The Unstoppable Man | Moonlight Jackson | |
| 1962 | Carry On Cruising | Nervous Steward | |
| 1962 | The Iron Maiden | Albert, Village Constable | |
| 1963 | Nurse on Wheels | Policeman | |
| 1963 | Ladies Who Do | Shop Steward | |
| 1964 | Carry On Cleo | Hessian Driver | |
| 1965 | The Big Job | Henry Blobbitt | |
| 1965 | Carry On Cowboy | Burt, Stagecoach Guard | |
| 1967 | Far From the Madding Crowd | Matthew Moon | |
| 1971 | See No Evil | Barker | |
