= John Gill (actor) =

British actor (1912–2007)

- Born: John Harry Gill; 24 October 1912; Bedwellty, Wales
- Died: 28 March 2007 (aged 94); Merton, Surrey, England
- Citizenship: United Kingdom
- Occupation: Actor
- Years active: 1933–1998
- Notable work: Doctor Who: Fury from the Deep (1968)

John Harry Gill (24 October 1912 – 28 March 2007) was a British character actor on both stage and screen.

== Biography ==
Gill was born in the small village of Bedwellty, Caerphilly County Borough in south Wales. He made his stage debut in 1933, with his career spanning 65 years.

His television credits include The Avengers, Dixon of Dock Green, The Saint, as Dr. Dutilleux in Maigret and as Arnie Braithwaite, owner of a Border Collie named Bouncer and a fervent sports fan, in All Creatures Great and Small.

Gill's numerous film credits include This Sporting Life (1963), Night Must Fall (1964), with Albert Finney in the comedic adaptation Something for Everyone (1970), and again in 1970 with Finney in Scrooge, the musical film adaptation of Charles Dickens' 1843 story A Christmas Carol, in which he played a grocer in debt to Mr Scrooge. Roman Polanski directed the actor in two of his movies: Tess (1979) and Pirates (1986).

Gill retired from acting in 1998 and died in Merton, Surrey, on 28 March 2007.
