= Andrew Robertson (actor) =

British actor (born 1941)

- Born: 1941 (age 84–85); Scotland, U.K.
- Occupation: Actor

Andrew Robertson (born 1941) is a British actor. He appeared in more than forty films since 1962.

== Selected filmography ==
Film
Year	Title	Role	Notes
1992	Year of the Comet		
1967	Far from the Madding Crowd		

TV
Year	Title	Role	Notes
1992	The Blackheath Poisonings	Landlord	
1989, 1999	Casualty		
1991	Rumpole of the Bailey		
1989	The Bill		
1988-1990	Colin's Sandwich		
1987	One by One		
1980	Take the High Road		
1980	The Onedin Line	Reverend John Stoner	
1979	Blake's 7		
1979	All Creatures Great and Small	Murray	
1978	Secret Army	Wing Commander Kelso	
1978	The Pirate Planet (Doctor Who)	Mr. Fibuli	
1975	Oil Strike North		
1970	The Borderers		
1966	Broome Stages		
1966	Adam Adamant Lives!		
