= Priscilla Morgan =

English actress (born 1934)

- Born: 14 January 1934 (age 92)
- Education: Old Vic Theatre School
- Occupation: Actress
- Spouse: Clive Dunn (m. 1959; died 2012)
- Children: 2

Priscilla Morgan (born 14 January 1934) is a British actress who appeared in British TV series such as Rooms (1977) and Pride and Prejudice (1980) and My Old Man, and movies such as Separate Tables (1958), On the Fiddle (1961), The Punch and Judy Man (1963), The Idol (1966), and The Cherry Picker (1974). She also appeared in the original 1954 West End theatre production of Terence Rattigan's Separate Tables, as well as the 1958 film version.

She was trained at the Old Vic Theatre School appearing in student productions.

Morgan was married to the actor Clive Dunn from 1959 until his death in 2012. They had two daughters.
