= Cedric Messina =

South African-British television producer and director

- Born: 14 December 1920; Port Elizabeth, South Africa
- Died: 30 April 1993 (aged 72); London, England
- Citizenship: South Africa
- Occupations: Television producer, Film director, Producer

Cedric Messina (14 December 1920 in Port Elizabeth, South Africa — 30 April 1993 in London) was a South-African born British television producer and director who worked for the BBC and is best remembered for his involvement in television productions of classic drama.

== Early life and career ==
Born to Sicilian and Welsh immigrant parents, Messina attended school in Johannesburg and joined the South African Broadcasting Corporation (SABC) in the 1930s. He first worked for the BBC as a radio announcer and drama producer for a time in 1947, later permanently moving to the UK and joining BBC Radio in the latter role during 1958.

Joining BBC Television in 1962, he was responsible for Dr Finlay's Casebook as producer and director for a time before being given responsibility for Theatre 625 on the new BBC 2. Becoming the producer of Play of the Month in 1966, he supervised more than 80 productions until 1977, and also produced opera for television.

== Later career ==
In 1975, while on location at Glamis Castle for a Play of the Month production of The Little Minister by J. M. Barrie, Messina thought he had found the ideal location for Shakespeare's As You Like It, an idea which soon grew to the BBC undertaking the entire Bardic canon. The BBC Television Shakespeare was the result, and Messina was responsible for the first two seasons (twelve plays) broadcast between 1978 and 1980. The series gained mixed reviews, and the perceived problems were often thought to be the responsibility of Messina himself. Clive James complained that Romeo and Juliet, the first screened production, was set "not in Verona, but in that semi-abstract, semi-concrete, wholly uninteresting city known to students as Messina." Susan Willis, in her book on the BBC Shakespeare cycle, writes: "That we have the televised Shakespeare series at all is entirely due to Messina; that we have the series we have and not perhaps a better, more exciting one is also in large part due to Messina."

He was chosen to produce The Falklands Play by Ian Curteis. TC1 at BBC Television Centre was booked for late January and early February 1987, but the £1 million production was postponed and then cancelled; Messina continued to defend both the play and author with no consideration for the effect it might have on his career. The Falklands Play was eventually televised in 2002 in a cut version. Messina's last production, was the BBC's The Happy Valley (1987) with Holly Aird.
