= Theatre 625 =

British TV drama anthology series (1964–1968)

- Title card
- Genre: Drama; Anthology; Television play
- Country of origin: United Kingdom
- Original language: English

Original release
- Network: BBC 2
- Release: 3 May 1964 – 5 August 1968

Theatre 625 is a British television drama anthology series, produced by the BBC and transmitted on BBC2 from 1964 to 1968. It was one of the first regular programmes in the line-up of the channel, and the title referred to its production and transmission being in the higher-definition 625-line format, which only BBC2 used at the time.

== Overview ==
Overall, about 110 plays were produced with a duration of usually between 75 and 90 minutes during the series' four-year run, and for its final year from 1967 the series was produced in colour, BBC2 being the first channel in Europe to convert from black and white. Some of the best-known productions made for the series include a new version of Nigel Kneale's 1954 adaptation of George Orwell's Nineteen Eighty-Four (1965); the four-part Talking to a Stranger by John Hopkins (1966) which told the same story from four different viewpoints, and features Judi Dench; and 1968's science-fiction allegory The Year of the Sex Olympics, again by Kneale.

In a 2000 poll of industry experts conducted by the British Film Institute to find the 100 Greatest British Television Programmes of the 20th century, Talking to a Stranger was placed seventy-eighth.

As with much British television output of the 1960s, many editions of Theatre 625 no longer exist (see Lost television broadcast). Some episodes, previously thought lost, were discovered in Washington D.C. in 2010. These recoveries included the remake of 1984. Only three plays, A Slight Ache, A Night Out and Mille Miglia, exist as their original 625-line colour videotapes. All's Well That Ends Well also survives in its original 625-line format, but only the first hour. Some episodes exist as lower-quality colour copies, but most plays survive as black and white 16mm or 35mm telerecordings. In addition, The Fanatics exist in full colour as a 35mm telerecording, and some short sequences on 35mm film survive from other plays.

== Episodes ==
And Some Have Greatness Thrust Upon Them, by Terence Frisby and directed by Gilchrist Calder, was planned for 1967 but cancelled as a result of Frisby obtaining an injunction against the BBC over a line excised from the script on grounds of indecency, but which Frisby deemed structurally significant to the script he had licensed.

== See also ==
- Armchair Theatre
- ITV Play of the Week
- ITV Playhouse
- BBC2 Playhouse
- The Wednesday Play
- Play of the Month
- Thirty-Minute Theatre
- Play for Today
- Play for Tomorrow
- Screen One
- Screen Two
- Second City Firsts
- Stage 2
- Thursday Theatre
