= Second Fiddle (novel) =

1988 novel by Mary Wesley

- First edition
- Author: Mary Wesley
- Language: English
- Published: 1988 (Macmillan)
- Publication place: United Kingdom
- Media type: Print
- Pages: 238
- ISBN: 0-333-47453-8

Second Fiddle (1988) is a best-selling novel by British author Mary Wesley.

== Plot summary ==
Twenty-three years old Claud Bannister has just failed his exam to be an accountant and is determined to give up his studies and become a writer. He is introduced to Laura Thornby at a concert. Laura is forty-five, single and a notorious meddler. When she hears about Claud's plans, and learns that he is living with his mother, Laura immediately starts rearranging his life. In no time Claud finds himself installed in a rented loft and making a living by selling antiques from a stall in the market. Laura becomes so interested in Claud's welfare, and her own, that she even ends up in bed with him. When Laura isn't visiting Claud in his loft, and he isn't working in the market, he is busy working on his novel, just as Laura had planned. But even Laura Thornby cannot foresee everything. Her affairs have always been brief and she has always been in total control, but with Claud she begins to lose control. When she sees what Claud has written, she realizes that he has a talent, and that she herself merely is playing second fiddle to his fictional characters.

== Major characters ==
- Laura Thornby: 45, single, the daughter of Nicholas and Emily Thornby.
- Claud Bannister: 23, single, aspiring writer.
- Margaret Bannister: Widow. Claud's mother.
- Emily and Nicholas Thornby: Twins and the parents of Laura Thornby.
- Helen and Christopher Peel: A married couple. Christopher was Laura's childhood friend; they had an affair when they were young.
- Martin Bengough: Works for the intelligence service. Is in love with Laura Thornby.
- Clug: A Romanian composer and conductor.
- Mavis: Aspiring actor, works as a waitress.
- Ann Kennedy: Mavis's mother; lets a loft to Claud Bannister.
- Brian and Susie: A married couple. Sell vegetables from their stall in the market.

== Major Themes ==
One of the most important recurring themes in Wesley's fiction is the conflict between ambiguity and identity originating in the question of illegitimacy. Laura Thornby is painfully aware of the village gossip suggesting that Nicholas is not just her uncle, but also her father. When Laura as a teenager first learned about it, she had not confronted her mother, but had set off abroad, working her way across Europe. In a state of resentment against Nicholas and Emily she had stayed there for years. "Then with acceptance came resignation...a mode of survival". Laura feels haunted by guilt in the relationship with her parents. When Nicholas and Emily are ill and ask her to come and look after them, she immediately feels responsible and rushes off to be with them. She tries to justify their behaviour and begins to reproach herself: "She had neglected...Emily and Nicholas, while enjoying herself...". "She had denied them love. Emily has grown old, Nicholas is old too". "Better...to love them as they are, stop judging". Wesley's heroines often seem to have an air of elusiveness about them (the young Calypso in The Camomile Lawn, Rose in Not That Sort of Girl, Hebe in Harnessing Peacocks and Laura Thornby in Second Fiddle). Laura Thornby is never totally committed in her relationships, she is afraid of "getting-close" and consequently she always cuts her affairs short. "Intimacy is not my genre", she says. "I am emotionally parsimonious".
