= Boskenna =

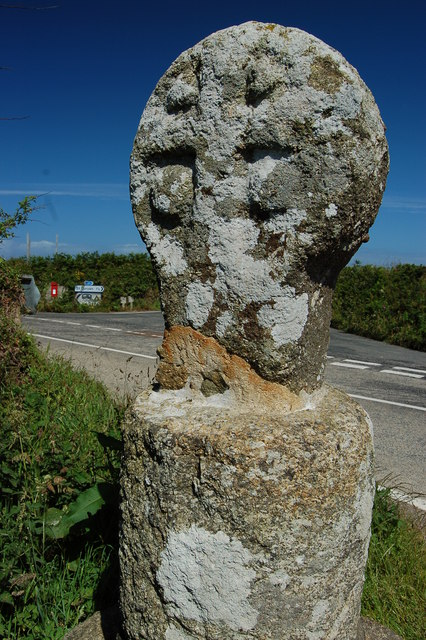
- Boskenna Cross

- Location within Cornwall
- 50.05723°N 5.60194°W
- Location: St Buryan, Cornwall, England

Listed Building – Grade II*
- Official name: Boskenna
- Designated: 15 December 1988
- Reference no.: 1137280

Boskenna is an early medieval settlement and large 17th-century manor house (formerly with associated farms and cottages) in the civil parish of St Buryan, west Cornwall, England, United Kingdom. Nearby, to the south, is the valley and cove of St Loy and the site of St Loy's chapel which was on the Boskenna side of a stream.

== History ==
It is first recorded as Boschene in the 13th or 14th century, and the house was enlarged and altered in the 19th century. Boskenna was the home of the Paynter family for centuries and the oldest part of the Boskenna house dates from 1678 and now forms its northwest wing. The prominent Jacobite James Paynter was from a junior branch of the Paynters of Hayle that settled at Trekenning House in St Columb Major parish. His Paynter relatives at Boskenna were also known to be Jacobite sympathisers and in 1745 villagers at St Buryan were convinced that the Paynter family were harbouring Charles Edward Stuart (the Young Pretender).

In 1881 the estate was ″about 1300 acres of land, pretty much in a ring-fence″. The house was added to extensively in 1888 incorporating some replications of 17th-century features and some original 17th-century ones (though not all in situ) in the exterior. Inside the 17th-century parlour with its fine ribbed plaster ceiling and the 17th-century open-well stair have been retained. The estate was sold in 1957, at which time it consisted of seven farms, five market gardens and a manor house.

English author Mary Wesley stayed at Boskenna with the Paynter family for a period of time and later used it as a backdrop in her novels The Camomile Lawn, Not That Sort of Girl, A Dubious Legacy and Part of the Furniture.

Boskenna Cross is a Cornish cross which stands where three roads meet south-east of St Buryan churchtown. It was found buried in a hedge at this road junction in 1869. Only the carved upper part of the cross is ancient.

== See also ==
- Alec Beechman
