= The Vacillations of Poppy Carew =

1986 novel by Mary Wesley

- First edition
- Author: Mary Wesley
- Language: English
- Publisher: Macmillan
- Publication date: 1986
- Publication place: United Kingdom
- Media type: print
- Pages: 262
- ISBN: 0-333-42119-1

The Vacillations of Poppy Carew (1986) is a novel by Mary Wesley. The title refers to the protagonist's inability to choose in life. However, when Poppy Carew's boyfriend leaves her, and her father dies, she is forced to make a decision and to learn how to deal with life on her own.

== Plot summary ==
Poppy Carew has just been dumped by her boyfriend, Edmund Platt, when her sick father dies, laughing (he couldn't stand Edmund). Poppy's father leaves her a large fortune and asks her to find him some "fun" undertakers for his funeral. Poppy is not a person who is used to make a decision about the direction of her life and suddenly she has her hands full. The two undertakers both fall in love with her, so does a guest at the funeral, and Edmund tries to get her back by kidnapping her from the wake. Bemused Poppy agrees to go with Edmund on a trip to North Africa where he has some business to attend to. Poppy spends most of her time in Africa in the half finished hotel while Edmund is out. Edmund, who can be violent when he is drunk, loses his temper in a quarrel with Poppy and she leaves. Willy the guest at her father's funeral rescues her from North Africa hoping to win her over. Safe back home Poppy begins to look out for the two handsome and single undertakers while Willy tries to awaken Poppy's interest.

== Major characters ==
- Poppy Carew - A young woman in her mid-twenties. She is insecure and vacillates between her options in life.
- Bob Carew - Poppy's father. A milkman, a betting man, and a gigolo.
- Edmund Platt - Poppy's former boyfriend throughout eight years. He dumped Poppy in favour of Venetia Colyer.
- Willy Guthrie - Calypso Grant's nephew. He runs a pigfarm.
- Fergus Furnival - About thirty and the owner of "Furnival´s Fine/Fun Funerals". Maybe a little too lighthearted to run a funeral establishment.
- Victor Lucas - A young freelance journalist, aspiring writer and a part-time undertaker. He is Fergus's cousin and his ex-wife is Penelope.
- Venetia Colyer - Rich divorcee, very pretty. The new woman in Edmund Platt's life.
- Mary Mowbray - Works for "Furnival´s Fine Funerals". Mother of baby Barbaby. Has once had a month-long affair with Fergus Furnival.
- Penelope - Victor Lucas's ex-wife who is more determined than her rather absent-minded ex-husband.
- Calypso Grant - A widow. Willy Guthrie's aunt and an old friend of Bob Carew.
- Ros Lawrence - Fergus Furnival's worried mother.

== TV adaptation ==
The Vacillations of Poppy Carew was adapted for TV and it was aired on ITV on 5 March 1995. Tara Fitzgerald played the lead as Poppy Carew and Daniel Massey was her father, Bob Carew. Owen Teale appeared in the role as Edmund Platt, Poppy's not so endearing boyfriend. The production was directed by James Cellan Jones.

== Themes ==
The complicated parents v daughter relationship is always present in Wesley. There is a certain similarity between Poppy Carew's and Wesley's own childhood. Poppy lost her mother when she was a baby and in her childhood her father, a gambler, would often be away from home to attend to his business on the racetracks. Poppy would then be left with the daily ladies Esmé and Mrs Edwardes. Wesley did not lose her mother in her childhood, but there were never loving feelings between them. "My mother was incapable of hiding her feelings", Wesley once said, "and I was just a boring appendage". Wesley's father was a military man and was often away from home, stationed abroad, leaving young Wesley in the care of various nannies and governesses.

The death of someone and/or a funeral often form the background of Wesley's story and triggers off the plot; the characters are then faced with a new situation which they have to adjust to. Poppy tries desperately to cling to the past with its comfortable safety by welcoming her boyfriend's return. Her patience and indulgence towards him is frustrating, if not painful, to witness, but eventually she reaches the point where personal development becomes imperative.

In her novels Wesley frequently returns to the theme of illegitimacy and the open question of the father's identity. In The Vacillations of Poppy Carew the cook-stable girl, Mary Mowbray, leaves for Spain shortly after having had an affair with her employer, Fergus Furnival. When the same Furnival many months later by chance runs into Mary, she has a baby in tow, but refuses to speak of her year in Spain. Everyone believes Mary's evasive story about the father being a Spanish fisherman called Joseph. No doubt Wesley's inclination to return to the subject of the uncertainty of fatherhood originates from an experience in her own "wild" youth. Wesley became pregnant with her second son, Toby Eady, at a time when the baby could have been her husband's as well as her lover's. Just as Wesley, Mary Mowbray is the only one who would have known whose child she was carrying. Doubts about the father's identity can also be seen in Not That Sort of Girl, The Camomile Lawn, A Dubious Legacy and Harnessing Peacocks.
