= Nicholas Le Prevost =

English actor (born 1947)

Nicholas Le Prevost (born 18 March 1947) is an English actor.

== Early life ==
Le Prevost was born in Wiltshire. He was educated at Shaftesbury Grammar School, Shaftesbury, Dorset, from 1957 to 1961 and at Kingswood School, Bath from 1961 to 1964. At school, he studied Ecclesiastical Architecture, and has said that, had he not become an actor, he would have liked to be an architect. He trained at the Royal Academy of Dramatic Art, graduating in 1973 with an Acting (RADA Diploma).

== Acting career ==
Le Prevost's TV and radio credits include Coronation Street, The Imitation Game, It Takes a Worried Man, The Jewel in the Crown, HR, Brideshead Revisited, The Camomile Lawn, Harnessing Peacocks, Babblewick Hall, The Ghosts of Motley Hall, Up the Garden Path, The War of the Worlds, Inspector Morse, Midsomer Murders, Foyle's War, Agatha Christie's Poirot, The Vicar of Dibley and A Man for All Seasons.

At the 2002 Laurence Olivier Awards, he was nominated for Best Performance in a Supporting Role in a Musical or Entertainment, for his performance in a 2001 West End production of My Fair Lady. Also in 2002, he appeared as Benedick in Gregory Doran's production of Much Ado About Nothing with the Royal Shakespeare Company, opposite Harriet Walter.

Since 2003, Le Prevost has been portraying Georges Simenon's fictional detective Jules Maigret for BBC Radio, replacing the late Maurice Denham in the role. In 2005, he appeared as W. Somerset Maugham in a BBC Radio adaptation of Maugham's novel The Razor's Edge.

His film work includes Clockwise, The Girl in a Swing, and Shakespeare in Love. In 2009 he appeared on television in Margaret.

In July 2010, he appeared in a double bill of Tom Stoppard's The Real Inspector Hound and Richard Brinsley Sheridan's The Critic at the Minerva Theatre, Chichester.

In 2010, he appeared in ITV drama Wild at Heart as Gene.

From February 2015, he appeared in Man and Superman at the National Theatre, London.

Le Prevost is a director of The Wrestling School, a London theatre company specialising in the work of Howard Barker.

In 2015, he appeared as Count Fiskon in the BBC TV series Father Brown episode "The Lair of the Libertines".

== Partial filmography ==
Year	Title	Role	Notes
1975	The Nearly Man	Phillip	Episode: "Millie - May 1945"
1976–1978	The Ghosts of Motley Hall	Sir Francis 'Fanny' Uproar/ St John Desmond	20 episodes
1977	Don't Forget to Write!	Dusty	2 episodes
1978	Crown Court	Tony Hodgson	Episode: "The Song Not the Singer"
1979	Bless Me, Father	Dr Spinks	Episode: "Father Neil's First Miracle"
1979	BBC2 Playhouse	Peter Molyneux	An Affinity With Dr Still
1979–1981	Shelley	Inspector/ Nayland	2 episodes
1980	Play for Today	Turner	The Imitation Game
1981	Brideshead Revisited	Doctor	Episode: "The Unseen Hook"
1981	The Borgias	Baglioni	5 episodes
1981	Strangers	Silas Wagstaff	Episode: "The Flowers of Edinburgh"
1981–1983	It Takes a Worried Man	Simon	12 episodes
1982	Crystal Gazing	Examiner No.1	Film
1982	The Agatha Christie Hour	Derek Wainwright	In a Glass Darkly
1982–1984	Crown Court	John Fletcher-Reed	3 episodes
1983	The Bounder	Softly Simpson	Episode: "A Genuine Simpson"
1983	Jemima Shore Investigates	Nick Beckleigh	Episode: "A Promising Death"
1984	The Jewel in the Crown	Nigel Rowan	6 episodes
1984	Dr. Fischer of Geneva	Albert	TV movie
1985	We'll Support You Evermore	Mardon	TV movie
1985	Time and the Conways	Gerald Thornton	TV movie
1986	C.A.T.S. Eyes	Roy Donahue	Episode: "One Way"
1986	Clockwise	Headmaster No.3	Film
1986	Screen Two	Alistair	Hard Travelling
1988	The Girl in a Swing	Vicar	Film
1988	South of the Border	Bridger	1 episode
1989	The Ginger Tree	Sir Claude MacDonald	2 episodes
1990	Stolen	Tom	4 episodes
1990–1993	Up the Garden Path	Michael	17 episodes
1991	The Lost Language of Cranes	Nick	Film
1991	Van der Valk	Van Hoorn	Episode: "A Sudden Silence"
1992	The Camomile Lawn	Hamish/ Hector	5 episodes
1993	Lovejoy	Bill Parker	Episode: "Ducking and Diving"
1993	Harnessing Peacocks	Mungo Duff	TV movie
1994	The Vicar of Dibley	Daniel Frobisher	Episode: "The Window and the Weather"
1995	Inspector Morse	Dr. Alan Hardinge	Episode: "The Way Through the Woods"
1996	Letters from the East	Alan	Film
1998	Midsomer Murders	Esslyn Carmichael	Episode: "Death of a Hollow Man"
1998	The Land Girls	Agricultural Officer	Film
1998	Shakespeare in Love	Sir Robert De Lesseps	Film
2000	Being Considered	Houston Jones	Film
2001	Kavanagh QC	Lord Cranston	Episode: "The End of Law"
2003	Bright Young Things	Lord Maitland	Film
2003	Fortysomething	Peter Mailer	1 episode
2003	Foyle's War	Arthur Lewes	Episode: "Fifty Ships"
2003–2004	My Dad's the Prime Minister	Headmaster	2 episodes
2004	Gladiatress	Crassus	Film
2005	The Murder Room	Marcus Dupayne	2 episodes
2005	Absolute Power	Lord Henry Cox-Wycliffe	Episode: "The Nation's Favourite"
2006	Poirot	Major James Porter	Episode: "Taken at the Flood"
2006	Silent Witness	Professor Lionel Clune	2 episodes
2008	Miss Conception	Dr. Dupompe	Film
2008	Broken Lines	Alistair	Film
2008	Filth: The Mary Whitehouse Story	Ken	TV movie
2009	Midsomer Murders	Jerry Drinkwater	Episode: "The Dogleg Murders"
2009	Cranford	Mr. Peter Jenkins	2 episodes
2009	Doc Martin	Robert	2 episodes
2009	Psychoville	Graham	2 episodes
2009	Margaret	Douglas Hurd	Television film
2010	Made in Romania	Cedric Winters	Film
2010	Wild at Heart	Gene	1 episode
2012	Run for Your Wife	D. S. Porterhouse	Film
2014	Testament of Youth	Mr. Leighton	Film
2015	Father Brown	Count Fiskon	Episode: "The Lair of the Libertines"
2019	Here Comes Hell	Ichabod Quinn	Film
2019	The War of the Worlds	Chamberlain	2 episodes
2022	The Larkins	Sir George Bluff-Gore	3 episodes
