= ITV Meridian =

South & South East England TV region

- Logo used since 2013

- Type: Region of television network
- Branding: ITV1
- Country: United Kingdom
- First air date: 1 January 1993; 33 years ago
- Founded: 16 October 1991; 34 years ago (company)
- TV transmitters: Rowridge, Dover, Hannington, Bluebell Hill, Midhurst, Whitehawk Hill, Heathfield; Oxford (since 2015)
- Headquarters: Whiteley, Hampshire (previously Southampton)
- Broadcast area: Central Southern England, South East England, Thames Valley
- Owner: ITV plc (2004–present); Granada plc (2000–2004); United News & Media (1996–2000)
- Dissolved: lost on-air identity on 27 October 2002 (now known as ITV1 at all times); company dissolved 25 November 2025
- Former names: Meridian Broadcasting
- Picture format: 1080i HDTV, downscaled to 16:9 576i for SDTV
- Affiliation: ITV
- Official website: itv.com/meridian
- Language: English
- Replaced: TVS

ITV Meridian (previously Meridian Broadcasting) is the holder of the ITV franchise for the South and South East of England. The station was launched at midnight on 1 January 1993, replacing previous broadcaster Television South, and is owned and operated by ITV plc, under the license of ITV Broadcasting Limited. The company was one of several (but not all) ITV plc-owned regional companies to have its legal name changed on 29 December 2006, when it became ITV Meridian Ltd. Until 25 November 2025, this company was, along with most other regional companies owned by ITV plc, listed with Companies House as a "dormant company".

The company broadcasts to the region from transmitters at Hannington, Midhurst, Rowridge, Whitehawk Hill, Hastings, Heathfield, Tunbridge Wells, Bluebell Hill, Dover and, since 2015, Oxford (previously part of the ITV Central region), as well as associated relays.

Today, ITV Meridian operates from studios in Whiteley, Hampshire, producing regional news services for three sub-regions, covering the South Coast of England, the South East of England and the Thames Valley.

== History ==
=== Formation ===
ITV Meridian was formed as Meridian Broadcasting in 1991. The company consisted of a consortium between Mills & Allen International (MAI), Selectv (15%) and Central Independent Television (20%), the latter of whom advised the consortium. Central and Selectv were instrumental in winning the franchise as a low bidder. Meridian intended to operate as a publisher broadcaster, meaning that the majority of programmes would be commissioned from independent producers rather than produced in-house.

In the ITV franchise auction of 1991, Meridian Broadcasting faced three other opponents in gaining the franchise, including the incumbent Television South and bids from Carlton Communications and CPV-TV. Meridian bid £36.5 million for the franchise, lower than TVS's bid of £59.8 million; however, the bid made by TVS was rejected following an unsatisfactory business plan. As the highest qualified bidder, Meridian therefore won the franchise.

=== Launch ===
Meridian Broadcasting launched at midnight on 1 January 1993 replacing Television South, with the programme Meridian – The First 10 Minutes, a 10-minute outside broadcast from Winchester Cathedral presented by Debbie Thrower and previewing the station's forthcoming output.

Other launch day programmes included Michael Palin's documentary First Night on Meridian and the first Meridian News bulletins for its three sub-regions. Meridian advertised its presence as the new ITV contractor heavily; promotions began appearing on TVS several weeks before the launch and the new company's logo was also incorporated into the product for the first advert shown on the station – the special edition Ford Fiesta Meridian, available through Southern Ford dealers.

=== Post-launch ===
Six months after the launch of Meridian Broadcasting, the new company joined up with HTV, Westcountry Television, Channel Television and S4C to form a joint advertising company operated by Meridian and HTV.

Shortly after, MAI began to expand by buying Anglia Television, the ITV franchise for the east of England, in 1994. The following year, MAI became a major shareholder in the consortium that won the franchise for Channel 5. In 1996, MAI merged with United Newspapers (via an agreed takeover by United) to form United News & Media (UNM). The resulting company owned the Daily Express newspaper, Meridian Broadcasting, Anglia Television, and a large shareholding (through the Yorkshire Post) in Yorkshire Tyne Tees Television, the owners of Yorkshire Television and Tyne Tees Television. The stake in Yorkshire Tyne Tees Television was sold to Granada Media, allowing them to take control of the two franchises in 1997. United News & Media later agreed to buy Scottish Television's 20% stake in HTV and on 28 June 1997, HTV was taken over fully by UNM for £370 million.

In 1999, plans emerged of a merger between UNM and rival Carlton Communications; however, these talks failed when it appeared that Meridian Broadcasting would have to be sold off as a condition of the deal. As a result, the television assets of UNM were sold to Granada; however, because of regulations stating that the company could not control that large an audience share, the broadcasting arm of HTV was sold to Carlton Television in exchange for the 20% stake that Central Independent Television held in Meridian Broadcasting.

=== ITV Meridian ===
In 2002, Granada Television and Carlton Television decided to consolidate the separate brandings for the ITV franchises that they controlled, changing the name of the region to ITV Meridian, with the on screen name of ITV1 used before all non-regional programming. The consolidation became further pronounced when Carlton Television and Granada Television merged to form ITV plc in 2004. 2004 also saw the move of ITV Meridian from their previous Northam studio complex to a new studio base in Whiteley, Hampshire.

In the subsequent years, ITV Meridian's workforce has been reduced slowly with its operations considerably downgraded. This came to a head when Michael Grade announced his intention to reduce the number of regional programmes from 17 to nine. As part of these plans, which were approved by Ofcom in 2008, the three editions of the news programme Meridian Tonight were replaced with a single edition with a pre-recorded opt out for either the South or South East of the region. The plans resulted in over half of Meridian's existing staff being made redundant; all employees wishing to remain with the company were obliged to re-apply for jobs. Some staff opted for voluntary redundancy and many others were left without jobs. Strike action was threatened as a result of the announcement.

At present the only local programming that ITV Meridian provides for the region is regional news programming and a pan-regional monthly late-night 30-minute political discussion programme, The Last Word. In 2013 proposals were approved by Ofcom that reversed the 2009 consolidation of ITV Meridian's regional news programmes, resulting in the reinstatement of the three sub-regions (South, East and Thames Valley). However to maintain lower costs, the main half-hour programme at 6pm contains a minimum 20 minutes of regional news (10 minutes in the Thames Valley) and daily use of "shared content" from outside the region. The practice of broadcasting one programme live and pre-recording others, using the same presenting team and studio set, continues.

== Studios ==
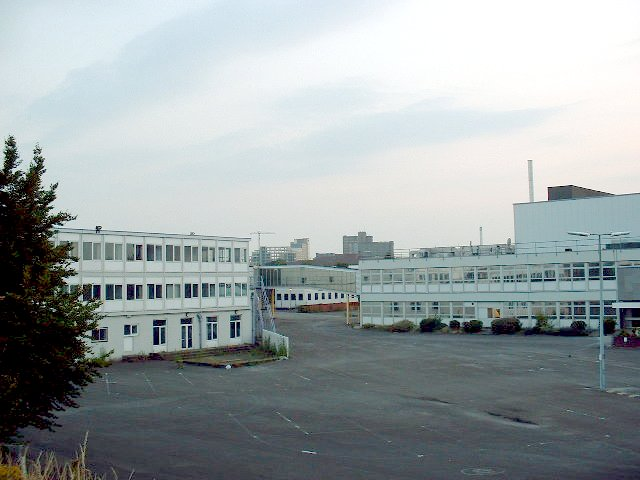
Former Meridian studios in Southampton

When Meridian originally won the franchise in 1991, its plans were to purchase buildings, not unlike its current arrangement today: with a small studio for continuity and local news. This was planned because, being a publisher-broadcaster, it did not plan to make any programmes itself, instead buying in programmes from independent production companies. However, when TVS lost its franchise, TVS's plans were to become an independent production company based at Vinters Park, Maidstone, site of the former TVS South East division. Meridian took the opportunity to buy the Southampton studios from TVS.

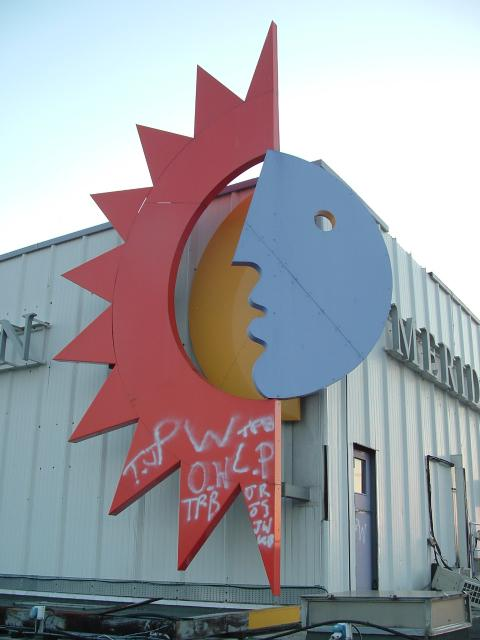
Meridian Logo on the side of their studios with graffiti on the bottom of the logo

Meridian did put these studios to good use in the future; on some occasions, Meridian would hire its studios out to the independent companies to use for the programmes, and, under the ownership of United News & Media, some Channel 5 programmes were made there. However, as a publisher-broadcaster, the facilities were generally too big for Meridian. By 2004, ITV plc had decided that regional programming would be phased out in the years to come. In 2004, Meridian closed their Northam studios and moved to a unit in a business park in Whiteley. These new headquarters at Forum One, Solent Business Park, contained a newsroom plus the main technical production and transmission arms of the programmes including three small news studios.

In the summer of 2008, Meridian's former studios at Southampton started to be dismantled, with plans to build a block of flats in its place. In December 2010, the site was still lying derelict after developer Oakdene fell into administration in 2009.

Over the weekend of 22–23 October 2011, ITV Meridian moved to new smaller premises in Fusion Three, on the same business park at Whiteley and across the road from its previous office. The new headquarters are again located in a conventional office building, and include two small studios, one of which is used for ITV News Meridian. The other is used for weather forecasts for the three sub-regions. The move was due to the cancellation of the lease at its former Whiteley premises.

In addition to Meridian's Southampton headquarters, the company operated other studios and news bureaux. Upon launch, the south east output came from The Maidstone Studios before moving to a purpose-built studio centre at New Hythe near Maidstone in Kent in 1994. Following the move of the studio to Whiteley, the complex closed with a south east newsroom with producers and reporters being moved back to The Maidstone Studios. Additionally, Meridian originally opened and operated a new studio complex at Newbury for its Meridian West operation. This closed in 2001, when the studio was moved to Southampton.

== Sub-regions ==
When Meridian launched, it divided its news operations into three separate sub regions. These regions were served by their version of news programme Meridian Tonight, presented by an individual team of presenters from a studio within the sub region. These regions were:

- Meridian South, serving central and eastern Dorset, the Isle of Wight, the majority of West Sussex, the Brighton & Hove coastal conurbation of East Sussex, southern Hampshire and southern Wiltshire. Initially broadcast from Meridian's Southampton headquarters.
- Meridian East, serving East Sussex, Kent, southern Essex and parts of West Sussex. Initially broadcast from The Maidstone Studios, before moving to New Hythe in 1994.
- Meridian North, serving Berkshire, northern Hampshire, northern Wiltshire and parts of Surrey. Initially broadcast from Newbury.

The services remained without major modification until 2001 when the Newbury complex was closed and the Meridian West studio operation was moved to the Southampton headquarters; Newsgathering remained the same as previously. When the company moved to Whiteley in 2004, presentation of all three editions of Meridian Tonight moved with the company, resulting in the closure of the New Hythe studio base, although newsgathering in the south-east was unaffected as journalists and reporters moved back to the Maidstone Studios. Despite this move not being uncommon in the broadcasting industry, some considered the move controversial, particularly as the Meridian South East programme would be presented 60 miles from the nearest part of the South East region and 160 miles from its furthest point.

On 4 December 2006, the Meridian West and Central South sub regions were merged to form the non-broadcast region ITV Thames Valley. This new service was broadcast from Whiteley, using Central's Abingdon base as the main newsgathering centre.

Under cost-cutting plans announced by ITV in September 2007 and agreed to by the UK's broadcasting regulator Ofcom in October 2008, the region's three sub-regions would be replaced with one programme. This new programme would be split between the South East and a combined South/Thames Valley region for the first half of the programme, and joined as one for the remainder of the programme. One of the opt out segments would be pre-recorded depending on the regions news. The new programme began on 9 February 2009, presented by Sangeeta Bhabra and Fred Dinenage. Pan-regional bulletins including morning ones during Daybreak, which are branded Daybreak Meridian News, are also used in the region. The sub-regions retain their own local advertisements.

In 2013, following a network wide rebrand of ITV, the long-standing Meridian Tonight brand was retired and replaced by ITV News Meridian. On 23 July 2013, proposals to reintroduce some elements of the sub-regional services were approved by Ofcom. As a result, ITV News Meridian now also produces separate breakfast, lunchtime and weekend bulletins for the South and South East with opt-outs within the main 6pm programme extended slightly to 20 minutes. In the former Thames Valley region, plans were also approved for a ten-minute opt out within the 6pm programme for the south of England and a full late night bulletin on weekdays after News at Ten.

== Identity ==
The Meridian logo introduced in 1991.

During Meridian's years as an independent broadcaster their on-screen idents typically featured a form-up of their logo. From their launch this featured an exploding mix of orange, yellow and blue, which came together to form the distinctive sun/moon face logo. The unusual logo design was reportedly inspired by maritime images (the sun/moon face is a recurring feature on compasses, sextants and other nautical artefacts used in the navigation of ships), appropriately reflecting the south's long seafaring history. The name "Meridian", which derives from the Latin meridionālis meaning "of the south", may also be linked to the Prime Meridian (the boundary between the Western and Eastern Hemispheres of the globe, and a key landmark in the measurement of time), which passes through the middle of the region, although this has not been confirmed.

On 2 September 1996, this ident was replaced by one with a deep purple/blue background and an emphasis on the deep colours of the logo, as well as a smoother form-up. This ident was replaced on 5 October 1998 by one with a yellow background and featuring a small ITV logo (starting in May 1999) underneath the Meridian name. On 8 November 1999, the emphasis was on the network's hearts logo, with a very small Meridian logo only featuring at the end of the form-up. This look was in use until October 2002 when ITV1 in England and Wales abandoned local continuity and idents. The only exceptions were ITV1 idents shown before regional programming, which featured the word "Meridian" below the ITV1 logo. However, even this did not last, and only a few years later these regional idents were dropped. On 2 February 2004, a regional caption was replaced with a generic "ITV Meridian" logo, the official name of the franchise. Meridian for a while managed to retain some identity by featuring their (sun/moon face) logo on the local weather forecast, as well as the news desk of Meridian News and Meridian Tonight. However, the logo was completely removed in 2004, last seen at the start of the late-night weather forecast on 5 December 2004.

ITV Meridian logo used from 2006 to 2013.

Since 2006, all idents have been generic to the entire network with no difference between regions and only the ITV1 name being used. On 14 January 2013, the station's on-air identity was changed to ITV, along with all other ITV plc-owned franchises. From September 2014, however, Meridian's identity was revived by an announcement (including the sub-region) immediately prior to the evening edition of ITV Meridian News.

== Programming ==
Meridian Broadcasting was originally intended to function as a publisher-broadcaster, commissioning most programmes from independent producers and with in-house production largely restricted to regional news, sport and current affairs. However, over time and as its ownership changed, Meridian began to make a number of regional and networked programmes itself. As its parent company MAI became a significant shareholder in Channel 5, Meridian supplied a number of the new channel's programmes for the network such as sports programme Turnstyle, youth programme The Mag and children's show Havakazoo.

Meridian also geared a large amount of its network output towards younger viewers, with independent commissions including Wizadora for pre-school children, plus ZZZap!, The Ruth Rendell Mysteries, It's a Mystery, The Vanishing Man, Jane Austen's Emma, William and Mary and Eye of the Storm for older children. Drama became a successful genre for the station, with Peter Kosminsky's No Child of Mine, tackling the emotionally difficult subject of child abuse, winning Meridian a BAFTA award. Meridian presents Mary Wesley's two novels: Harnessing Peacocks and The Vacillations of Poppy Carew. Later, the same production team tackled vicious childhood bullying in Walking on the Moon. Meridian's two-part production In the Name of Love in 1999 starred Tara Fitzgerald, Tim Dutton and Mark Strong, and was written by Sarah-Louise Hawkins and directed by Ferdinand Fairfax. Hornblower was a Sunday night success for the ITV network while another Sunday night favourite, Where the Heart Is, transferred production from Anglia Television to Meridian in 2002 – the station's last major contribution at a network level.

=== Networked programming ===
- Animal ER (1998–2002, for Channel 5)
- Close and True (2000, co-produced by Coastal Productions)
- Dog and Duck
- Eye of the Storm (1993, produced by Childsplay Productions)
- Full Stretch (1993, co-produced by Clement/La Frenais Productions)
- Gentlemen and Players (1992)
- It's a Mystery (1996–2002)
- Harnessing Peacocks (1993)
- Hearts & Bones (2000–2001, co-produced by BBC)
- Hornblower
- Emma (1996)
- Fallen (2004)
- I Want that House (2003–05)
- In the Name of Love (1999)
- Jays' World (1995–97)
- Jeopardy! (1993; previously TVS, co-produced by Reg Grundy Organisation)
- The Last Detective (2003–07)
- Monkey Business
- MotoGP (for Channel 5)
- No Child of Mine (1997)
- Over the Rainbow (1993, co-produced by SelecTV)
- ReBoot (Produced by Mainframe Entertainment, but Meridian purchased the broadcasting rights for ITV and also provided some funding for the series. Ceased support for the show after the third season, which was subsequently axed from CITV after the 9th episode.)
- Roger and the Rottentrolls (1996–2000, co-produced by Children's Company for Meridian, later Yorkshire Television)
- The Ruth Rendell Mysteries (1994–2000; previously TVS)
- Shine on Harvey Moon (1995)
- Sometime, Never (1995–96; co-produced by SelecTV in association with WitzEnd Productions)
- Sooty's Amazing Adventures (1997–98)
- Teddybears
- That's Esther
- Under the Hammer (1994, co-produced by New Penny Productions)
- The Ark (2001–2004)
- The Vacillations of Poppy Carew (1995)
- The Vanishing Man (1997–1998)
- TV Weekly (1993–1994, taken over from TVS)
- The Turn of the Screw (1999)
- Walking on the Moon (1999)
- What's My Line?
- Where the Heart Is (2002–2005, transferred from Anglia Television)
- Wizadora (1993–1998)
- William and Mary (2003–05)
- WoW (1996)
- ZZZap! (1993–2001)
- Espresso (1996–1999, produced for Channel 5)
- Fire Rescue (2000, Channel 5)
- Turnstile (1997, Channel 5)
- The Mag (1997, Channel 5)

=== Local programmes ===
- 7 Days (1993–2002)
- Ambulance! (1993–2000)
- A Weekends's Work (1997–2002)
- The Afternoon Show (1996–??)
- Big Bike Little Bike (2001–02)
- Classic Cars (2001–04)
- Country Ways (1993–2008)
- Dogs With Dunbar
- Doing It Up (1994–2000)
- Freescreen
- Gardens of the Millennium (2000)
- Grass Roots (1993–2002)
- Killer Queens (2002)
- Houseparty (1993–95)
- Late Night Live
- Meridian Audit (1995–98)
- Meridian Masterclass (1996–98)
- At Home With Maggie Philbin (1998)
- Decision Time With Fred Dinenage (1999)
- Meridian Motorsport (1996–2004)
- Meridian Spotlight (1993–98)
- In The Past (2000–03)
- The Pier (1993–99)
- Ridge Riders (1994–2002)
- Rural Rides (1997–99)
- Screen Challenge
- Ski Time
- Soccer Sunday
- Soccernight
- Taped Up (1998–2002)
- Turning Points (1993)
- Three Minutes
- Surprise Chefs (1994–2001)
- Under Offer (1998–2002)
- The Village (1993–2002)
- Birdwatch With Chris Packham (1994–1998)
- Wildwatch With Chris Packham (1998–2000)
- The Green Team (2000)
- The Bottom Line With Kate Garraway (1995–1996)
- Come Home For Christmas (1997–2000)
- Looking For Love (1997-200?)

== See also ==
- ITV (TV network)
- ITV (TV channel)
- History of ITV

ITV regional service
Preceded by TVS	Berkshire & northern Hampshire; 1 January 1993 – 3 December 2006 (on-air brand & franchise); 4 December 2006 – present (franchise only)	Succeeded by ITV Thames Valley
Preceded by TVS	South & South East England; 1 January 1993 – present	Current provider as ITV Meridian
Preceded by ITV Thames Valley	Oxfordshire, Berkshire & northern Hampshire; 9 February 2009 – 31 December 2013 (on-air brand only); 1 January 2014 – present (on-air brand & franchise)	Current provider as ITV Meridian
