= A Dubious Legacy =

1992 novel by Mary Wesley

- First edition
- Author: Mary Wesley
- Cover artist: Susan Moxley
- Language: English
- Publisher: Bantam Press
- Publication date: 1992
- Publication place: United Kingdom
- Media type: Print
- Pages: 319
- ISBN: 0-593-02537-7

A Dubious Legacy (1992) is a novel written by the British author Mary Wesley. The story takes place in the West Country, England, from 1944 to 1990. It concerns the tragic and bizarre marriage of the Tillotsons and their relationship with two young couples who keep visiting them throughout the years.

== Plot summary ==
While stationed abroad during World War II Henry Tillotson has married a complete stranger at his father's request. When the war is over, and his father has died, Henry brings his bride with him back to his estate, Cotteshaw, in the West Country. The first thing the bride does on their arrival is to give her husband a black eye and without a word march upstairs to her bedroom where she will reside for the best part of the rest of her life. Two young couples, Antonia and Matthew, and Barbara and James, begin to visit Cotteshaw frequently. Unwilling to admit it, the two young ladies are attracted to the fifteen years older Henry Tillotson, and fascinated and frightened by his mysterious wife, Margaret, who will endure their visits in her bedroom with bored superiority. Margaret Tillotson is beautiful - but mad. She likes to make up malicious stories about everyone at Cotteshaw and enjoys inflicting pain on everyone who comes into range, preferably without lifting her head from the pillow. Her husband reacts to her fancies with indulgence and nauseating kindness while he tries to be a host to his guests. The nature of his wife means that Henry Tillotson is in need of an heir, and Margaret refuses to divorce him. However, the two couples keep returning to Cotteshaw throughout the years, and every time Henry is the perfect and attentive host, especially to Antonia and Barbara.

== Characters ==
- Henry Tillotson: The magnanimous owner of Cotteshaw
- Margaret Tillotson: Henry's wife who rarely gets out of bed.
- Antonia: Married to Matthew and the mother of Susie and Clio.
- Barbara: A close friend of Antonia's. Married to James and the mother of Hilaria.
- Matthew: Married to Antonia and the father of Susie and Clio.
- James: Married to Barbara and the father of Hilaria.
- Pilar: The housemaid. Brought to Cotteshaw by Henry's father.
- Ebro: Pilar's son.
- Trask: The butler and odd-job man at Cotteshaw.
- Basil: Margaret Tillotson's American brother.
- Calypso and Hector Grant: Have been friends with Henry Tillotson for years. Live near Cotteshaw.
- The Jonathans: A homosexual couple. Henry's friends since childhood and possibly his half-brothers.
- Peter and Maisie Bullivant: The Tillotsons´ rather tactless neighbours.
- Susie: Matthew's and Antonia's oldest daughter.
- Clio: Matthew's and Antonia's youngest daughter.
- Hilaria: James's and Barbara's only child.
- Valerie: James's former girl-friend. Never seen, but often mentioned.

== Themes ==
In Wesley's fiction the safe marriage is a recurring theme; people rarely get married out of love. In that respect A Dubious Legacy is an extreme case: Henry Tillotson has married Margaret because it was his father's last wish; Margaret married Henry because she was stranded in Egypt and needed a British passport. Matthew enjoys the thought that Antonia is still a virgin and sees her as some kind of conquest; Antonia wants to marry Matthew because he can provide for her, so she can give up her job. Barbara is James's second choice, but his first choice has just dumped him and he needs a consolation and wants to start a family, and Barbara marries James because she wants to get away from home and her parents. Another recurring fictional theme in Wesley's books is the affirmation of illegitimacy (Hebe in Harnessing Peacocks, Emily Thornby in Not That Sort of Girl, Mary Mowbray in The Vacillations of Poppy Carew, Polly in The Camomile Lawn and Juno in Part of the Furniture). In the case of A Dubious Legacy Antonia and Barbara both have an affair with Henry Tillotson, and about nine months later they both have a daughter. Antonia's and Barbara's respective husbands know nothing about their wives´ infidelity, and they may very well be the fathers of the two baby girls themselves. They have no reason to think otherwise. Antonia and Barbara will never know the true identity of the father for certain. However, Henry seems to be convinced that the children are his. When he finds the two pregnant women soaked and freezing by the lake he becomes worried and cries out: "Let´s get you home. I don´t want to lose my babies".

== Trivia ==
The script of A Dubious Legacy was delivered by hand to Wesley's publisher in London, by a street cleaner who had found it in a litter bin on the South Bank. Apparently it had fallen out of a Post Office van.
