= Ken Taylor (scriptwriter) =

English screenwriter (1922–2011)

- Born: 10 November 1922; Bolton, Lancashire, England
- Died: 17 April 2011 (aged 88); Cornwall, England
- Occupation: Screenwriter

Kenneth Heywood Taylor FRSA (10 November 1922 – 17 April 2011) was an English screenwriter.

== Life ==
Taylor was born on 10 November 1922 in Bolton, Lancashire, England. The son of a cotton mill owner, he was educated at Gresham's School, Holt. He won a place at the University of Cambridge, but delayed starting his degree to serve in the Royal Air Force during the Second World War. His bad eyesight ruled out being a pilot, but he was trained as a radio operator. In 1941, he was posted to India. Having returned from the war, he chose to abandon his place at Cambridge and instead attended the Old Vic Theatre School, specialising in theatre direction.

Under the name Ken Taylor, he wrote scripts for television drama in a career spanning more than four decades.

In 1964 The Devil and John Brown received the Best Original Teleplay Award of the Writers' Guild of Great Britain. In the same year, Taylor was named Writer of the Year by the Guild of Television Writers and Directors (later BAFTA) for his trilogy of television plays The Seekers.

The Jewel in the Crown, adapted from Paul Scott's Raj Quartet novels as a fifteen-hour mini-series, earned Ken Taylor an Emmy nomination in 1984 along with the award as Writer of the Year from the Royal Television Society, while his The Camomile Lawn (1992), adapted from Mary Wesley's book of the same name, received a BAFTA nomination. His adaptation credits also include Jane Austen's Mansfield Park, The Melancholy Hussar by Thomas Hardy, The Widowing of Mrs Holroyd by D. H. Lawrence, The Birds Fall Down by Rebecca West and The Girls of Slender Means by Muriel Spark, and The Devil's Crown.

In 1953, Taylor married Gillian Dorothea Black and they had two sons and two daughters. One son, adopted, is the Liberal Democrat politician Matthew Taylor.

He died on 17 April 2011 in Cornwall, England.

== Awards ==
- Writers' Guild of Great Britain Best Original Teleplay Award, 1964
- Guild of Television Writers and Directors' Writer of the Year Award, 1964
- Royal Television Society Writers' Award, 1984
- Fellow of the Royal Society of Antiquaries, 2008
