= Jennifer Ehle =

American-British actress (born 1969)

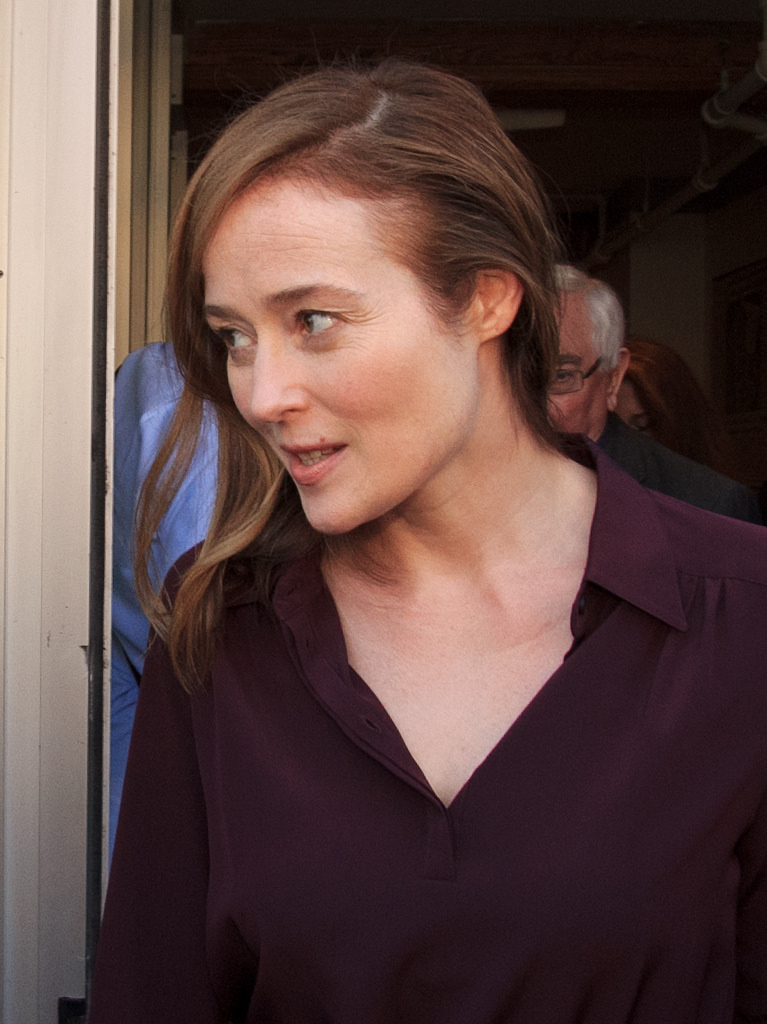
- Ehle in 2016
- Born: Jennifer Anne Ehle; December 29, 1969 (age 56); Winston-Salem, North Carolina, U.S.
- Education: North Carolina School of the Arts; Central School of Speech and Drama
- Occupation: Actress
- Years active: 1991–present
- Spouse: Michael Ryan (m. 2001; div. 2025)
- Children: 2
- Parents: John Ehle (father); Rosemary Harris (mother)
- Awards: See below

Jennifer Anne Ehle (/ˈiːli/ EE-lee; born December 29, 1969) is an American-British actress who has starred in and won numerous awards for her prolific work in stage, film, and television productions. Her accolades include two Tony Awards, a BAFTA Award for Best Actress (TV), and a Screen Actors Guild Award for Best Cast in a Motion Picture. She is most widely known for her role as Elizabeth Bennet in the 1995 BBC miniseries Pride and Prejudice, for which she received the British Academy Television Award for Best Actress.

Ehle began her career acting on stage in the United Kingdom, with the Edinburgh Festival, the Royal Shakespeare Company, and the National Theatre. She earned a Tony Award for Best Actress in a Play and a nomination for the Laurence Olivier Award for Best Actress in Tom Stoppard's The Real Thing. She reunited with Stoppard acting in his play The Coast of Utopia (2007), earning a Tony Award for Best Featured Actress in a Play. She appeared on Broadway in the J. T. Rogers play Oslo, earning a second Tony nomination for Best Actress.

Ehle is also known for her film performances, including The King's Speech (2010), Contagion (2011), Zero Dark Thirty (2012), A Little Chaos (2014), Little Men (2016) and She Said (2022). She has also appeared in various television programs, including the Hulu limited series The Looming Tower (2016), the Showtime miniseries The Comey Rule (2020), the CBS legal drama The Good Fight (2022), the Amazon Prime miniseries Dead Ringers (2023), and AMC's The Vampire Lestat (2026).

== Early life and education ==
Jennifer Anne Ehle was born on December 29, 1969 in Winston-Salem, North Carolina, to English actress Rosemary Harris and American author John Ehle. Her ancestry includes Romanian (from a maternal great-grandmother) and, paternally, German and English. Ehle appeared as a toddler in a 1973 Broadway revival of A Streetcar Named Desire, in which her mother played Blanche DuBois.

Ehle spent her childhood in the UK and the US, attending several schools, including Queen's College, London followed by Interlochen Arts Academy as a high school acting student from 1985 to 1987. She was mainly raised in North Carolina. She matriculated as a BFA acting student at the North Carolina School of the Arts (that her father helped found) until 1988, and states that she was accepted at the Juilliard School but chose to continue her training at the Central School of Speech and Drama in London.

== Career ==
=== 1990s ===
Ehle was in her final term at Central when she left to make her professional debut as Calypso in The Camomile Lawn (released in 1992), a television adaptation of Mary Wesley's book of the same name, in which she and her mother played the same character at different ages. The director, Peter Hall, then cast her as Elmire in his 1991 production of Tartuffe, for which she won second prize at the Ian Charleson Awards.

Ehle's most notable role was as Elizabeth Bennet in the BBC 1995 television adaptation of Jane Austen's Pride and Prejudice co-starring Colin Firth, for which she won the British Academy Television Award for Best Actress. The same year, she joined the Royal Shakespeare Company, and gained her first major feature film role in Paradise Road (1997). She also appeared in supporting roles in Brian Gilbert's Wilde (1997), and István Szabó's Sunshine (1999).

=== 2000s ===
In 2000, Ehle made her Broadway debut as Annie in Tom Stoppard's The Real Thing, winning the Tony Award for Best Performance by a Leading Actress in a Play. That following year, Ehle appeared again on Broadway in the revival of Noël Coward's Design for Living co-starring with Dominic West and Alan Cumming.

After a hiatus, Ehle returned to the London stage in 2005 in The Philadelphia Story at the Old Vic opposite Kevin Spacey. The following year, she played Lady Macbeth in Macbeth with Liev Schreiber, as part of the Shakespeare in the Park.

Ehle returned to Broadway portraying three characters in Stoppard's The Coast of Utopia triptych, which ran from October 2006 until May 2007, Ehle starring alongside Billy Crudup, Martha Plimpton, and Ethan Hawke. Theatre critic Ben Brantley of The New York Times praised her performance as "memorable". For her performance, she received her second Tony Award for Best Featured Actress in a Play.

In August 2009, it was announced that Ehle would play the character of Catelyn Stark in the pilot of HBO's Game of Thrones, an adaptation of George R.R. Martin's A Song of Ice and Fire fantasy book series. Ehle filmed the pilot episode, but decided it was too soon to return to work after the birth of her daughter and she did not return to the production when HBO commissioned a full season. Northern Irish actress Michelle Fairley replaced her.

=== 2010s ===
In 2010, Ehle starred alongside John Lithgow in the production of Mr. & Mrs. Fitch presented by Second Stage Theatre in New York City. Since 2010, Ehle has appeared in the films The King's Speech (where she reunited with her Pride and Prejudice co-star Colin Firth), Steven Soderbergh's Contagion (2011), George Clooney's The Ides of March (2011), Kathryn Bigelow's Zero Dark Thirty (2012), Alan Rickman's A Little Chaos (2015), Terence Davies's A Quiet Passion (2016), and Ira Sachs's Little Men (2016). She also appeared in the television series A Gifted Man (2011–2012).

In 2017, Ehle appeared on stage in Oslo, which won the Tony Award for Best Play. She was nominated for Best Actress in a Play for her work. In 2018, she appeared in the Hulu limited series The Looming Tower as Ambassador Barbara Bodine. The series also starred Jeff Daniels, Bill Camp, Peter Sarsgaard, and Michael Stuhlbarg.

=== 2020s ===
In 2020, Ehle reunited with Jeff Daniels in the limited series The Comey Rule which premiered on Showtime. Daniels and Ehle portrayed former FBI Director James Comey and his wife Patrice, respectively. In 2022 she also appeared in a variety of television projects including the Apple TV+ series Suspicion as Amy, the Showtime legal drama The Good Fight as Judge Ashley Burnett, and the Paramount+ western series 1923 as Sister Mary.

Also in 2022, Ehle received positive reviews for her supporting role in the MeToo investigative drama She Said, portraying Laura Madden. TIME film critic Stephanie Zacharek described her as "superb" and Justin Chang writing for NPR declared her performance "quietly heartbreaking". She also returned to the stage as Gertrude in the Park Avenue Armory production of Hamlet in New York. Ehle received positive reviews as a last minute replacement for Lia Williams.

Ehle starred as Rebecca Parker in the 2023 Amazon Prime thriller miniseries Dead Ringers. The series won a Peabody Award "for aptly packaging a bold adaptation of this twinned-body horror classic within the continued nightmarish world of women’s reproductive health care in the United States."

In 2024, Ehle appeared in four episodes of Law & Order: Organized Crime as Meredith Bonner, the Police Chief of Westbrook, Pennsylvania, who assists Elliot Stabler (Christopher Meloni) with the search for a serial killer.

In 2026, Ehle played Gabriella de Lioncourt, the mother of the titular character in The Vampire Lestat.

== Personal life ==
Ehle was married to writer Michael Ryan from 2001 to 2025. They had two children.

== Acting credits ==
=== Film ===
Year	Title	Role	Notes and refs.
1994	Backbeat	Cynthia Powell	
1997	Paradise Road	Rosemary Leighton-Jones	
1997	Wilde	Constance Lloyd Wilde	
1998	Bedrooms and Hallways	Sally	
1999	Sunshine	Valerie Sonnenschein	
1999	This Year's Love	Sophie	
2002	Possession	Christabel LaMotte	
2005	The River King	Betsy Chase	
2006	Alpha Male	Alice Ferris	
2008	Pride and Glory	Abby Tierney	
2008	Before the Rains	Laura Moores	
2009	The Greatest	Joan	
2010	The King's Speech	Myrtle Logue	
2011	The Ides of March	Cindy Morris	
2011	Contagion	Ally Hextall	
2011	The Adjustment Bureau	Brooklyn Ice House Bartender	
2012	Zero Dark Thirty	Jessica Karley	
2014	RoboCop	Liz Kline	
2014	Black or White	Carol Anderson	
2014	The Forger	Kim Cutter	
2014	A Little Chaos	Madame De Montespan	
2015	Advantageous	Isa Cryer	
2015	Fifty Shades of Grey	Carla Wilks	
2015	Spooks: The Greater Good	Geraldine Maltby	
2016	Little Men	Kathy Jardine	
2016	The Fundamentals of Caring	Elsa	
2016	A Quiet Passion	Vinnie Dickinson	
2017	Fifty Shades Darker	Carla Wilks	Unrated edition only
2017	I Kill Giants	Mrs. Thorson	
2017	Detroit	Morgue Doctor	Uncredited
2017	Wetlands	Kate Sheehan	
2018	The Miseducation of Cameron Post	Dr. Lydia Marsh	
2018	Monster	Maureen O'Brien	
2018	Fifty Shades Freed	Carla Wilks	
2018	Vox Lux	Josie the Publicist	
2018	Take Point	Agent Mackenzie	
2019	The Wolf Hour	Margot	
2019	Run This Town	Judith	
2019	The Professor and the Madman	Ada Murray	
2019	Beneath the Blue Suburban Skies	Tina	
2019	Saint Maud	Amanda Kohl	
2021	John and the Hole	Anna Shay	
2022	She Said	Laura Madden	
2023	Barbie	Elizabeth Bennet	Archival footage
2025	East of Wall	Tracey	
2025	Our Hero, Balthazar	Nicole	
2025	In Transit	Ilse	
TBA	Lone Wolf		Post-production

=== Television ===
Year	Title	Role	Notes and refs.
1992	The Camomile Lawn	Calypso	Miniseries, 5 episodes
1992	The Young Indiana Jones Chronicles	Zita of Austria	Episode: "Austria, March 1917"
1993	The Maitlands	Phyllis	BBC TV production
1993	Self Catering	'Meryl'	TV movie
1993	Rik Mayall Presents: Micky Love	Tamsin	Miniseries, 6 episodes
1995	Pride and Prejudice	Elizabeth Bennet	Miniseries, 6 episodes
1996	Beyond Reason	Penny McAllister	TV movie
1997	Melissa	Melissa	Miniseries, 5 episodes
2008	The Russell Girl	Lorraine Morrissey	TV movie
2011–12	A Gifted Man	Anna Paul	16 episodes
2013	Low Winter Sun	Susan	Episode: "Ann Arbor"
2014–15	The Blacklist	Madeline Pratt	2 episodes
2018	The Looming Tower	Ambassador Barbara Bodine	3 episodes
2020	The Comey Rule	Patrice Comey	Miniseries
2022	Suspicion	Amy	Episode: "Be the Gray Man"
2022	The Good Fight	Judge Ashley Burnett	Episode: "The End of Ginni"
2022–23	1923	Sister Mary	4 episodes
2023	Dead Ringers	Rebecca Parker	5 episodes
2023–26	Lioness	Evelyn Mason	12 episodes
2024	Law & Order: Organized Crime	Chief Meredith Bonner	4 episodes
2026	The Vampire Lestat	Gabriella de Lioncourt	Series regular
TBA	First Woman	Helen Sadler	Upcoming six-part drama

=== Theatre ===
Year	Title	Role	Venue	Notes and Refs.
1989	1959 Pink Thunderbird		Edinburgh Festival	
1989	Laundry and Bourbon		Edinburgh Festival	
1991	Tartuffe	Elmire	Peter Hall Company	
1992	Breaking the Code	Pat Green	Triumph Productions Tour	
1995–96	Richard III	Lady Anne	Royal Shakespeare Company	
1995–96	Painter of Dishonour	Serafina	Royal Shakespeare Company	
1995–96	The Relapse	Amanda	Royal Shakespeare Company	
1999	The Real Thing	Annie	Donmar Warehouse	
1999	Summerfolk	Varvara Mikhailovna	National Theatre	
2000	The Real Thing	Annie	Albery Theatre	
2000	The Real Thing	Annie	Barrymore Theatre	
2001	Design for Living	Gilda	American Airlines Theater	
2005	The Philadelphia Story	Tracy Lord	The Old Vic	
2006	Macbeth	Lady Macbeth	Delacorte Theater	
2006	The Coast of Utopia: Voyage	Liubov Bakunin	Vivian Beaumont Theater	
2006	The Coast of Utopia: Shipwrecked	Natalie Herzen	Vivian Beaumont Theater	
2007	The Coast of Utopia: Salvage	Malwida von Meysenbug	Vivian Beaumont Theater	
2010	Mr. and Mrs. Fitch	Mrs. Fitch	Second Stage Theatre	
2017	Oslo	Mona Juul	Vivian Beaumont Theater	
2022	Hamlet	Gertrude	Park Avenue Armory	

== Awards and recognition ==
Tony Awards

Year	Category	Nominated work	Result, ref.
2000	Best Actress in a Play	The Real Thing	Won
2007	Best Featured Actress in a Play	The Coast of Utopia	Won
2017	Best Actress in a Play	Oslo	Nominated

BAFTA Awards

Year	Category	Nominated work	Result, ref.
1996	Best Actress (TV)	Pride & Prejudice	Won
1998	Best Supporting Actress (Film)	Wilde	Nominated

Screen Actors Guild Award

Year	Category	Nominated work	Result, ref.
2010	Best Cast in a Motion Picture	The King's Speech	Won

Laurence Olivier Award

Year	Category	Nominated work	Result, ref.
2000	Best Actress	The Real Thing	Nominated

Outer Critics Circle Award

Year	Category	Nominated work	Result, ref.
2000	Best Actress – Play	The Real Thing	Nominated
2007	Best Featured Actress – Play	The Coast of Utopia	Nominated

Other award wins:

- 1991: Ian Charleson Award, Second Prize – as Orgon's wife in Tartuffe with the Peter Hall Company
- 1992: Radio Times Award Best Newcomer – The Camomile Lawn (TV).
- 2000: Variety Club Award – The Real Thing (play).

Other award nominations:

- 2000: Genie Award nomination – Sunshine.

== See also ==
- List of American film actresses
