= Harnessing Peacocks (film) =

1993 British television film

- Based on: Harnessing Peacocks by Mary Wesley
- Screenplay by: Andrew Davies
- Directed by: James Cellan Jones
- Starring: Serena Scott Thomas; Peter Davison; John Mills
- Music by: Richard Holmes

Production
- Producers: Georgina Abrahams; Betty Willingale
- Running time: 101 minutes
- Production company: Friday Productions for Meridian Broadcasting

Original release
- Network: ITV
- Release: 9 May 1993

Harnessing Peacocks is a 1993 British television film directed by James Cellan Jones and starring Serena Scott Thomas, Peter Davison and John Mills. It was adapted by Andrew Davies from the 1985 novel Harnessing Peacocks by Mary Wesley. It was produced by Friday Productions in association with Meridian Broadcasting for the ITV network, first screened on 9 May 1993 in the United Kingdom and shown in the United States of America on 28 November 1993. The film won the prestigious Golden Nymph award for Best Television Film at the Monte-Carlo Television Festival.

== Main cast ==
- Serena Scott Thomas - Hebe Rutter
- Peter Davison - Jim Huxtable
- John Mills - Bernard Quigley
- Nicholas Le Prevost - Mungo Duff
- Renée Asherson - Louisa Fox
- Jeremy Child - Julian Reeves
- Brenda Bruce - Amy Tremayne
- Tom Beasley - Silas Rutter
- Richard Huw - Rory Grant
- Abigail McKern - Hannah Krull
- David Harewood - Terry
