= The Camomile Lawn (serial) =

- Country of origin: United Kingdom
- Original language: English
- No. of series: 1
- No. of episodes: 4 (5 on DVD)

Original release
- Network: Channel 4; ABC
- Release: 5 March – 2 April 1992

The Camomile Lawn is a television adaptation of the 1984 book of the same name by Mary Wesley, produced by Glenn Wilhide and Sophie Balhetchet at ZED Ltd for Channel 4, directed by Peter Hall. It was adapted from Wesley's novel by Ken Taylor and first broadcast in 1992. It was nominated for the BAFTA TV Award for Best Drama Serial in 1993.

Set just before and during the Second World War, with an aftermath that takes place in the mid 1980s, the action begins at the Cornish country house of Helena Cuthbertson.

The title is drawn from a camomile lawn between the house and the sea cliffs on which some significant events take place.

== Outline ==
The story begins in August 1939, when young adults Oliver, Calypso, Polly, and Polly's brother Walter are visiting their disorganised Aunt Helena and her husband Richard Cuthbertson at their house by the sea in Cornwall, which has a camomile lawn. Ten-year-old Sophy, the daughter of Richard’s late half-sister, lives with them and is delighted with the arrival of her cousins, especially Oliver. The family is often visited by the twin sons of the rector of the parish and by Max and Monika Erstweiler, a Jewish refugee couple from Austria whom the rector has taken in; they are missing their only son, Pauli, reported to be in a German concentration camp. The cousins invent 'The Terror Run', a cliff path dash which they race at night by the light of a full moon. They are joined by some of the adults, and Sophy is determined to run it as well. However, on a daylight practice run, a coastguard exposes himself to Sophy, with surprising results.

After he has fought in the Spanish Civil War, Oliver is depressed and disenchanted, but develops a crush on Calypso. She fends him off, determined to make the most of her beauty and marry a much richer man.

Polly is intelligent and practical, and when the Second World War breaks out in September 1939 she joins the War Office to work for Military intelligence, while her brother Walter joins the Royal Navy, Oliver the army, and the twins the Royal Air Force. Meanwhile, Max and Monika are interned as enemy aliens. Calypso marries Hector Grant, a Scottish landowner and member of parliament, but has many affairs. The Erstweilers are released, and Helena begins an affair with Max, and Richard with Monika. Walter is killed at sea, and Calypso has a son, Hamish, shortly after her London house has been hit by a bomb, with Sophy acting as midwife. Pauli Erstweiler is reported to have died in Dachau, but in fact survived the war.

In 1984, more than forty years later, the survivors meet again at the house in Cornwall for the funeral of Max Erstweiler. He had become a well-known violinist and bought the house from Helena after Richard’s death. Oliver is now a well-known author. Oliver says he has had two failed marriages to Calypso lookalikes. He and Sophy find they are both single and leave the funeral together, planning to get to know each other.

The house now belongs to Pauli, who plans to replace the camomile lawn with a swimming pool and sell the property.

== Cast ==
- Toby Stephens as Oliver Ansty
- Jennifer Ehle as Calypso
- Tara Fitzgerald as Polly
- Felicity Kendal as Helena Cuthbertson
- Paul Eddington as Richard Cuthbertson
- Rebecca Hall as Sophy
- Ben Walden as Walter
- Jeremy Brook as Paul
- Joss Brook as David
- Richard Syms as Rector
- Jane Evers as Mildred Floyer
- James Gaddas as Tony
- Nicholas Le Prevost as Hector and Hamish Grant
- Polly Adams as Sarah Ansty, Oliver’s mother
- Oliver Cotton as Max Erstweiler
- Trudy Weiss as Monika Erstweiler
- Richard Vernon as General Peachum
- Vivienne Ritchie as Iris
- John Elmes as James
- Rosemary Harris as older Calypso
- Virginia McKenna as older Polly
- Claire Bloom as older Sophy
- Richard Johnson as older Oliver
- Ralph Michael as older Tony
- Martin Benson as Pauli Erstweiler

== Locations and production ==
The principal film locations were at Broom Parc House, Veryan, Cornwall, the nearby village of Portloe, and central London.

The younger leading actors, Toby Stephens and Jennifer Ehle, were both playing their first screen roles. The scriptwriter, Ken Taylor, was the father of Matthew Taylor, member of parliament for this part of Cornwall. Ehle's screen career was launched by the television drama, in which she played a role that required multiple nude scenes. "I haven't done any nudity since - and never will again," she later said. "When I took the job, I didn't realize there would be so much of it, but no one forced me to do it. The first time I felt really shocked - then came a whole day of naked scenes. I went home and was physically sick. But it wasn't the time or place to sit down and ask why I'd done it. I'd forgotten that I'd be seen naked in a lot of living rooms."

Jennifer Ehle's real-life mother, Rosemary Harris, played the older Calypso in the post-war scenes.

== Reception ==
The Camomile Lawn achieved unprecedented viewing figures for Channel 4, its success not exceeded until Humans was broadcast more than twenty years later.

== Musical score ==
The theme tune for the adaptation, by Stephen Edwards, is based on Ravel's String Quartet in F major, a piece of music rehearsed in the action by Max (Oliver Cotton) and his colleagues.

== Episodes (DVD release) ==
No.	Title	Directed by	Written by	Original release date
1	"Episode One"	Peter Hall	Ken Taylor	5 March 1992
The family gathers at the camomile lawn in Cornwall in the summer of 1939. Oliver returns from the Spanish Civil War and pursues Calypso, who rejects him, saying frankly that she is looking for someone richer. Sophy has a traumatic experience and the family meets the classical musician Max and his wife Monika, Austrian Jewish immigrants.
2	"Episode Two"	Peter Hall	Ken Taylor	12 March 1992
As the Second World War breaks out, Calypso finds a rich husband, much to Oliver's dismay. Sophy is sent away to a boarding school, and Helena begins an affair. Polly finds a job in the War Office. She and Calypso take advantage of their new-found freedom to embark on a series of affairs.
3	"Episode Three"	Peter Hall	Ken Taylor	19 March 1992
Oliver is disappointed when the reality of adult life does not live up to his dreams. Calypso receives a surprise and Helena continues her affair. Sophy tells Walter her terrible secret.
4	"Episode Four"	Peter Hall	Ken Taylor	26 March 1992
Tragedy strikes when a family member is killed in action. Hector is reported missing, and Richard comes to London, disturbing Helena's daily life. Meanwhile, Polly is unable to choose between two men, and Sophy witnesses the barbarities of war for herself first hand.
5	"Episode Five"	Peter Hall	Ken Taylor	2 April 1992
Forty years on, the family gathers at the Camomile Lawn for a funeral, finally resolving Oliver's complicated love life, and Polly and Calypso's relationships with their children.
