= HR (radio series) =

Radio comedy-drama program

HR is a radio comedy-drama written by Nigel Williams and produced by Peter Kavanagh. The show ran for five series between 2009 and 2014 and starred Nicholas Le Prevost and Jonathan Pryce. A total of thirty episodes were made for the series.

The show follows lazy human resources officer Sam and trouble-making colleague Peter. From the second series, the pair have retired.

A pilot episode for television was also made and broadcast on BBC Four in 2007.

== Cast ==
- Nicholas Le Provost as Sam
- Jonathan Pryce as Peter
- Kate Fahy as Kate (Series 5)
- David Haig as Ed (Series 5)

== Episodes ==
=== Series 1 ===
Episode No.	Series No.	Title	Broadcast Date
1	1	An Appraisal	13 February 2009
2	2	An Away-Day	20 February 2009
3	3	A Commute	27 February 2009
4	4	A Role Play	6 March 2009
5	5	A Leaving Party	13 March 2009
6	6	A Bus Pass	20 March 2009

=== Series 2 ===
Episode No.	Series No.	Title	Broadcast Date
7	1	Gassing	23 August 2010
8	2	Dogging	30 August 2010
9	3	Wandering	6 September 2010
10	4	Surfing	13 September 2010
11	5	Remodelling	20 September 2010
12	6	Consulting	27 September 2010

=== Series 3 ===
Episode No.	Series No.	Title	Broadcast Date
13	1	Naked	1 February 2012
14	2	Disabled	8 February 2012
15	3	Married	15 February 2012
16	4	Disinherited	22 February 2012
17	5	Robbed	29 February 2012
18	6	Gambled	7 March 2012

=== Series 4 ===
Episode No.	Series No.	Title	Broadcast Date
19	1	Money	22 February 2013
20	2	After Gherkin	1 March 2013
21	3	Goodbye Uncle Norman	8 March 2013
22	4	Musical	15 March 2013
23	5	Lamb of my Father	22 March 2013
24	6	The Return of Martina Guerre	29 March 2013

=== Series 5 ===
Episode No.	Series No.	Title	Broadcast Date
25	1	Love Precisely	19 February 2014
26	2	Wild About Gorillas	26 February 2014
27	3	Jesus O'Rahilly	5 March 2014
28	4	Everybody's Doing It	12 March 2014
29	5	Peter and Sam and Ed and Kate	19 March 2014
30	6	Till Death Do Us Part	26 March 2014
