= An Imaginative Experience =

1994 novel by Mary Wesley

- First edition
- Author: Mary Wesley
- Language: English
- Publisher: Bantam Press
- Publication date: 1994
- Publication place: United Kingdom
- Media type: Print
- Pages: 223
- ISBN: 0-593-03577-1

An Imaginative Experience (1994) is a novel by British writer Mary Wesley. The story concerns a young mother who has lost her husband and son in a car crash and the guilt and self-reproach she has to go through as a consequence of her loss.

== Plot summary ==
Julia Piper lives alone in her London apartment after having lost her son and husband in a car crash. Julia's relationship with her mother is not a loving one. Her mother blames Julia for the accident, and Julia blames herself. Unwilling and unable to confide in anyone about her feelings Julia keeps to herself and distances herself from her surroundings. Julia makes a living as a cleaning lady and one of her clients is Sylvester Wykes, publisher and divorcee. When they eventually meet, Sylvester immediately is fascinated by the young and unapproachable woman. But, haunted by guilt and self-reproach, Julia is not interested in entering into a relationship with Sylvester. Instead, unable to talk to anyone about her loss, Julia keeps her feelings to herself and becomes increasingly reserved and isolated. In addition to her grief, Julia is being stalked. Ever since the funeral she has been terrorized by a stranger who keeps following her and makes phone calls late at night, pushing her closer to the edge.

== Characters ==
- Julia Piper: Widow. Mother of Christy and used to be married to Giles. She is the daughter of Clodagh May.
- Mrs Clodagh May: Julia Piper's mother and Christy's grandmother.
- Madge Brownlow: Clodagh May's neighbour, friend and gossip.
- Giles: Deceased. Julia Piper's abusive ex-husband and Clodagh May's lover and son-in-law.
- Sylvester Wykes: Publisher. Has just divorced Celia and has hired Julia Piper as his cleaning lady.
- Celia: Sylvester Wykes's ex-wife.
- Rebecca: Sylvester Wykes's interfering former secretary.
- Maurice Benson: Former policeman and private detective who has turned full-time bird watcher. Unmarried.
- Mr and Mrs Patel: An Indian couple who runs a corner shop. Friends of Julia Piper's.
- Angie and Peter Eddison: Live in the flat immediately below Julia Piper's.
- Janet and Tim Fellowes: Live in the bottom flat in Julia Piper's block.
- John: Sylvester Sykes's partner in publishing.
- Christy: Deceased. Julia Piper's and Giles's son.

== Major Themes ==
In the wake of her son's death Julia Piper is being tortured by irrational guilt. Her husband was a hopeless driver who had been banned from driving, and Julia blames herself for not having been there to drive them. She also feels guilty about associating her beloved son with her husband, Giles, (whom she hated): "...he had Giles's hair, Giles's eyes, Giles's mouth, Giles's expression, his gestures! He was Giles in miniature. The likeness has grown in my mind until it is monstrous and I cannot see my little boy any more". As always in Wesley's fictional universe the mother-daughter relationship is a bitter one. Clodagh (Julia Piper's mother) openly admits that Julia is "the regretable result" of her short marriage to Julia's father, and: "I do not regard her as my daughter". It's no wonder that Julia left home when she was sixteen. When Julia has been raped, and finds out that she is pregnant, her mother insists that Julia marries Giles (her rapist), to save her from the social disgrace an illegitimate child would be.
