= A Sensible Life =

1990 novel by Mary Wesley

- First edition
- Author: Mary Wesley
- Language: English
- Publisher: Bantam Press
- Publication date: 1990
- Publication place: United Kingdom
- Media type: Print
- Pages: 380
- ISBN: 0-593-01930-X

A Sensible Life (1990) is a novel written by British author Mary Wesley. The story takes its beginning in 1926 when Flora Trevelyan is ten years old and follows her life, and the people whose lives she touches, throughout the following thirty-five years.

== Plot summary ==
In 1926 Mr and Mrs Trevelyan from England are holidaying in Brittany with their ten-year-old daughter, Flora. The two parents openly despise and neglect the young girl, who is left to occupy herself whilst they prepare to depart for a life in colonial India without her. Left to herself Flora gradually befriends the locals and the other guests at the hotel, who show her more attention and kindness than she receives from her parents. Flora soon falls helplessly in love with no less than three young men (Cosmo, Blanco and Felix) who are also staying at the hotel, and she is crestfallen when the holidays are over and they have to leave. When her parents leave for India Flora is left at a boarding school in England where she will spend the following seven years. Only once is Flora invited to spend her holidays with the Leighs, whom she met in Brittany, and in the years that follow she is only in casual contact with the Leighs and Cosmo, Blanco and Felix. When Flora is seventeen she is supposed to go to India to meet her parents who then will find her a suitable husband, but Flora decides to get off the ship in Marseille and return to England. Back in England she has to make a living on her own and becomes a housemaid for a family in London and later in the West Country. She begins to live an independent and sensible life.

== Major characters ==
- Flora Trevelyan: The only child of Vita and Denys Trevelyan.
- Denys Trevelyan: Flora's putative father. A civil servant stationed in India.
- Vita Trevelyan: Flora's mother.
- Angus Leigh: Retired Army man. The husband of Milly Leigh and the father of Cosmo.
- Mrs Milly (Millicent) Leigh: Cosmo's mother.
- Cosmo Leigh: The son of Angus and Milly Leigh.
- Blanco Wyndeatt-Whyte: A friend of Cosmo's and a frequent guest of the Leighs. Real name Hubert.
- Cousin Thing: Blanco's rich cousin. Real name Hubert Wyndeatt-Whyte.
- Madame Tarasova: An Armenian dressmaker based in Brittany and later in London.
- Mabs: Cosmo's older sister.
- Tashie: Mabs's girl-friend from school.
- Joyce: A friend of Mabs's and Tashie's.
- Baroness Rosa Habening: Dutch Baroness and a widow. The mother of five daughters and Felix.
- Elizabeth, Anne, Marie, Dottie and Dolly: The five daughters of Baroness Habening.
- Felix: The handsome son of Baroness Habening.
- Alexis: Madame Tarasova's husband who lives in Paris.
- Nigel: Mabs's boyfriend.
- Henry: Engaged to Tashie.
- Miss Green: A spinster and aspiring writer.

== Themes ==
The conflict between parents and their children is always present in Wesley's works. However, in A Sensible Life the parental neglect is extreme. The Trevelyans´ indifference towards Flora is so obvious that even the other guests at the hotel start gossiping about it: "One sees the child, but she is rarely with her parents...they spend their time in bed". As a child Flora is understandably heartbroken and confused by her parents´ lack of interest in her. Later in life, when she has interrupted her journey to India, Flora views her parents´ indifference with calm acceptance: "They don´t like me...I am an impediment; they are wrapped up in each other...To be fair. I don´t like them". Wesley's young heroines are usually expected to enter into the inevitable "safe marriage", encouraged by their parents and dictated by convention. "We girls are not brought up to do jobs. We are brought up to marry". With her modest education Flora is expected to go to her parents in India and find herself a suitable husband who can support her. As Flora's (putative) father puts it: "When she is seventeen we´ll get her out to India and be shot of her". However, Flora's wish for independence is greater than her need for security and she interrupts her journey to India. She never sees her parents again.
