= Not That Sort of Girl =

1987 novel by Mary Wesley

- First edition
- Author: Mary Wesley
- Language: English
- Publisher: Macmillan
- Publication date: 1987
- Publication place: United Kingdom
- Media type: Print
- Pages: 279
- ISBN: 0-333-44552-X

Not That Sort of Girl (1987) is a novel by British author Mary Wesley. The novel is set in Southern England and takes its beginning in the late 1930s and follows the life of Rose Peel throughout 48 years of marriage.

== Plot summary ==
At the age of 19 Rose is in love with the passionate but penniless Mylo Cooper but agrees to marry Ned Peel. She doesn't love Ned, but it's the safe thing to do. Ned has inherited a country house called Slepe from an uncle, and the married couple move in shortly after the wedding. Rose immediately falls in love with the house and its garden, if not with its owner. During the war Ned is away from the house a lot and her real love, Mylo, starts visiting her at Slepe. They go on meeting each other secretly through all 48 years of Rose's marriage until her husband's death.

Shortly after Ned dies, Rose leaves Slepe, her beloved home for half a century (now her son's and not so beloved daughter-in-law's), taking only a few things with her. Temporarily installed in a hotel room, Rose starts looking back on her life. Her marriage was one of convenience; she was never passionately in love with her husband. However, on their wedding night she promised him that she would never leave him, a promise she could never break. Now at the age of 67 she is free, and doesn't know where she is going in life.

== Important Characters ==
- Rose: Married to Ned Peel, although she is in love with Mylo Cooper. She is thirteen years younger than her husband.
- Ned Peel: Rose's husband and the owner of the estate named Slepe.
- Mylo Cooper: In love with Rose, but too poor to be marriage material. During the war he smuggles Frenchmen across the Channel.
- Mr Freeling: Rose's father, who says he has cancer to get things his way.
- Mrs Freeling: Rose's mother, who starts to live when her husband dies.
- Christopher: Ned's and Rose's son (their only child).
- Mrs Edith Malone: A friend of Rose and the superior socialite of the area.
- Emily Thornby: Nicholas Thornby's twin sister. She has an affair with Ned, who may be the father of her child.
- Nicholas Thornby: Like his sister he is not wealthy, but takes advantage of other peoples generosity or ignorance. He is very close to his sister, he may even be the father of her child.
- Archibald Loftus: Scotsman and Ned Peel's uncle.
- Flora Loftus: Ned's aunt and married to Archibald.
- Mr Farthing: The gardener at Slepe.
- Mrs Farthing: The cook at Slepe.

== Themes ==
A noticeable and recurring theme in Wesley's works is the idea of the large house, the idyllic and peaceful sanctuary in the West Country (notably in The Camomile Lawn, A Dubious Legacy, Part of the Furniture and Not That Sort of Girl). As a young woman Mary Wesley spent most of the war (World War II) at a large estate named Boskenna on the south coast of Cornwall near Land's End. Boskenna became the ideal house in Wesley's universe. In Not That Sort of Girl the large house is named Slepe, and if Ned Peel isn't the ideal husband, at least Slepe becomes the ideal house. It is a place where Rose is safe from the war and the fear of the blitz in the city; she is away from the terror of superiors (her parents) and conventions. The reason why the war provides such a convenient background for Wesley is that war makes people do things they otherwise wouldn't have done. About her own experience of war, Wesley said: "We had been brought up so repressed. War freed us. We felt if we didn´t do it now, we might never get another chance". The Thornby twins certainly make the most of it and are not inhibited by conventions - they may even have a child together. Ned is having an affair with Emily Thornby and may also be the father of her child. Rose suspects this, but doesn't care. Even sensible Rose is having an affair; she has the nerve of letting Mylo stay at Slepe while Ned is at war. They all seem to go against the normally accepted conventions without worrying about the consequences of their actions - they may, after all, be wiped out tomorrow.

Rose married Ned Peel because he was the safest choice, not because she loved him. The safe marriage appears repeatedly in Wesley's works. As a young woman Rose is an insecure and impressionable soul, and just like Calypso in The Camomile Lawn and Antonia and Barbara in A Dubious Legacy, Rose seeks someone who can provide for her and take care of her. The fact that she is insecure appeals to Ned because he likes to feel superior. When Rose has married Ned and they move into Slepe she is at first alone (Ned joins the army). Life at Slepe without Ned gives Rose a chance to become an independent individual and not just her husband's appendage. Like most of Wesley's women she evolves and to his horror Ned must realise that his young wife is not as easy to manipulate as he had first thought.
