= Frenchman's Creek (novel) =

1941 novel by Daphne du Maurier

- First UK edition
- Author: Daphne du Maurier
- Language: English
- Publisher: Gollancz (UK); Doubleday (US)
- Publication date: 1941
- Publication place: United Kingdom
- Pages: 208 (UK 1st ed)

Frenchman's Creek is a 1941 historical novel by Daphne du Maurier. Set in Cornwall during the reign of Charles II, it tells the story of a love affair between an impulsive English lady, Dona, Lady St. Columb, and a French pirate, Jean-Benoit Aubéry.

== Synopsis ==
Dona, Lady St. Columb, makes a sudden visit with her children to Navron, her husband's remote estate in Cornwall, in a fit of disgust with her shallow life in London court society. There she finds that the property, unoccupied for several years, is being used as a base by a notorious French pirate who has been terrorising the Cornish coast. Dona finds that the pirate, Jean-Benoit Aubéry, is not a desperate character at all, but rather a more educated and cultured man than her own doltish husband, and they fall in love.

Dona dresses as a boy and joins the pirate crew on an expedition to cut out and capture a richly laden merchant ship (the Merry Fortune) belonging to one of her neighbours. The attack is a success but the news of it brings Dona's husband, Harry, and his friend Rockingham to Cornwall, disrupting her idyllic romance. Harry, Rockingham and the other locals meet at Navron to plot how to capture the pirate, but Aubéry and his crew cleverly manage to capture and rob their would-be captors instead. Rockingham, who has designs on Dona himself, perceives the relationship between her and Aubéry, and Dona is forced to kill him in self-defence when he attacks her in a jealous rage. Meanwhile, Aubéry is captured and accused of Rockingham's death while trying to return to his ship and Dona hatches a plot for his release. This is successful, but in the end she chooses to stay with her husband for the sake of her children while Aubéry returns to his ship.

== Adaptations ==
The 1944 film Frenchman's Creek starring Joan Fontaine, Arturo de Córdova and Basil Rathbone (as Rockingham) is a fairly faithful adaptation of the novel. It also starred Nigel Bruce, Rathbone's old Sherlock Holmes film partner, in their only non-Holmes/Watson screen appearance together.

A television film of 1998 starred Tara Fitzgerald as Dona, James Fleet as her husband, Tim Dutton as Rockingham and Anthony Delon as the Frenchman.
