= Babblewick Hall =

- Genre: Radio comedy
- Written by: Scott Cherry
- Starring: Nicholas Le Prevost; David Antrobus
- Country of origin: United Kingdom
- Original language: English
- No. of series: 2
- No. of episodes: 10

Original release
- Network: BBC Radio 4
- Release: 27 December 1995 – 25 September 1998

Babblewick Hall is a radio comedy broadcast on BBC Radio 4 written by Scott Cherry. It was set in eighteenth-century Britain and told the story of Fenton Babblewick, a well-meaning but sometimes confused squire played by Nicholas Le Prevost, and his clever Scottish servant Augustus Snipe, played by Forbes Masson. The show consisted of two series. The first, with six weekly episodes, ran from 27 December 1995 to 31 January 1996. The second ran from 4 to 25 September 1998.

== Cast ==
- Nicholas Le Prevost as Fenton Babblewick
- Forbes Masson as Mr Augustus Snipe
- David Antrobus as Barney

== Episodes ==
=== Series 1 ===
| No. | Title | Original release date |
|---|---|---|
| 1 | "Episode 1" | 27 December 1995 |
| 2 | "Episode 2" | 3 January 1996 |
| 3 | "Episode 3" | 10 January 1996 |
| 4 | "Episode 4" | 17 January 1996 |
| 5 | "Episode 5" | 24 January 1996 |
| 6 | "Episode 6" | 31 January 1996 |

=== Series 2 ===
| No. | Title | Original release date |
|---|---|---|
| 1 | "Episode 1" | 4 September 1998 |
| 2 | "Episode 2" | 11 September 1998 |
| 3 | "Episode 3" | 18 September 1998 |
| 4 | "Episode 4" | 25 September 1998 |
