= Oxbridge Blues =

- Genre: Drama
- Written by: Frederic Raphael
- Theme music composer: Richard Holmes
- Country of origin: United Kingdom
- Original language: English
- No. of episodes: 7

Production
- Producer: James Cellan Jones
- Cinematography: John Hooper
- Running time: 75 minutes
- Production company: BBC

Original release
- Network: BBC2
- Release: 14 November – 19 December 1984

Oxbridge Blues is a 1984 British television series, produced and broadcast in the UK by the BBC. It is an anthology of seven approximately 75-minute television plays by Frederic Raphael, most of which focus on relationships of one kind or another. Most of the plays except one take place in England; "He'll See You Now" takes place in the U.S., and "Sleeps Six" takes place in England and France. The series was broadcast in the U.S. on A&E in 1986 and on PBS in 1988. In Australia, the series was broadcast on ABC in 1987.

The series won the 1987 CableACE Award for Best Dramatic Series. The eponymous first teleplay in the series, "Oxbridge Blues", was nominated for a BAFTA television award for Best Single Drama, and other individual episodes garnered several other awards and nominations.

The seven plays were adapted by the novelist Frederic Raphael from the short stories from his own collections Sleeps Six and other stories (1979) and Oxbridge Blues and other stories (1980). He described the television series as "mostly kind of chamber pieces – modest dramas about love and sex and honour and marriage". Raphael directed one episode, James Cellan Jones directed four, and Richard Stroud directed two. Each episode of Oxbridge Blues is a separate and unrelated story, with different characters in each.

In December 1984, the BBC published the seven scripts together in book form, entitled Oxbridge Blues and Other Plays for Television.

== Episodes ==
No.	Title	Directed by	Original release date
1	"Oxbridge Blues"	James Cellan Jones	14 November 1984
Two rival brothers (Ian Charleson, Malcolm Stoddard) find their fame and fortune is dramatically altered when one (Stoddard) becomes a best-selling sex novelist.
2	"That Was Tory"	Richard Stroud	21 November 1984
Old passions and new jealousies provoke an odd coupling between a married man (John Bird) and the wife of his good friend (Carol Royle).
3	"Similar Triangles"	James Cellan Jones	28 November 1984
The thrill is gone for two adulterous lovers (Malcolm Stoddard, Kate Fahy) when the spouse of one dies.
4	"He'll See You Now"	Frederic Raphael	28 November 1984
A neurotic actress (Susan Sarandon) is tempted into a more intimate relationship with her analyst (Barry Dennen).
5	"The Muse"	Richard Stroud	5 December 1984
A wimpish cartoonist (David Suchet) takes on the rough-'n-tumble personality traits of his most popular character.
6	"Cheap Day"	James Cellan Jones	12 December 1984
A chance meeting with a handsome stranger (Norman Rodway) tempts a happily married woman (Ciaran Madden) into testing the waters of infidelity.
7	"Sleeps Six"	James Cellan Jones	19 December 1984
An idyllic holiday in the South of France turns into an ordeal for a film producer (Ben Kingsley) and his loving wife (Diane Keen) when his aristocratic agent (Jeremy Child) turns up.

== Main cast ==
- Ian Charleson as Victor Geary ("Oxbridge Blues")
- Rosalyn Landor as Wendy ("Oxbridge Blues")
- Amanda Redman as Maxine ("Oxbridge Blues")
- Michael Elphick as Curly Bonaventura ("Oxbridge Blues")
- Malcolm Stoddard as Philip Geary ("Oxbridge Blues"); Michael ("Similar Triangles")
- Kate Fahy as Eileen ("Similar Triangles"); Lizzie ("Cheap Day")
- Ciaran Madden as Laura ("Cheap Day"); Rachel ("Similar Triangles")
- Norman Rodway as Alec ("Cheap Day"); Narrator ("Similar Triangles")
- Geoffrey Palmer as Fred ("Cheap Day")
- Christopher Good as James ("Cheap Day")
- Ben Kingsley as Geoff Craven ("Sleeps Six")
- Diane Keen as Sherry Craven ("Sleeps Six")
- Jeremy Child as Philip Witham ("Sleeps Six")
- Jackie Smith-Wood as Lady Jane Witham ("Sleeps Six")
- Susan Sarandon as Natalie ("He'll See You Now")
- Barry Dennen as Dr. Stein ("He'll See You Now")
- David Suchet as Colin ("The Muse")
- Frances Tomelty as Angela Lane ("The Muse")
- Carol Royle as Tory ("That Was Tory"); Ellen ("The Muse")
- John Bird as Clive ("That Was Tory")
- Joanna Lumley as GiGi ("That Was Tory")

== Music ==
The series theme music was composed by Richard Holmes, and sung by the English group Cantabile.

== Awards and nominations ==
- The series won the 1987 CableACE Award for Best Dramatic Series.
- The first episode, "Oxbridge Blues", was nominated for a BAFTA television award for Best Single Drama.
- Susan Sarandon won the 1987 CableACE Award for Best Actress in a Dramatic Series for her performance in the episode "He'll See You Now".
- Frederic Raphael won the 1987 CableACE Award for Best Writing a Dramatic Series, for episode "Sleeps Six".
- Ben Kingsley was nominated for a CableACE Award for Best Actor in a Dramatic Series for his performance in the episode "Sleeps Six".

== See also ==
- Cambridge Blue – Sports award
- Cambridge Blue (colour) – Colour commonly used by sports teams from the University of Cambridge
- Oxford Blue – Sports award
- Oxford Blue (colour) – Shade of blue used by Oxford University
