= James Cellan Jones =

British television and film director (1931–2019)

- Born: 13 July 1931; Swansea, Wales
- Died: 30 August 2019 (aged 88)
- Education: St John's College, Cambridge
- Occupations: Television director and producer
- Years active: 1960–2001
- Known for: The Forsyte Saga (1967); Fortunes of War (1987)
- Title: Head of Plays, BBC Television
- Term: 1976–1979
- Predecessor: Christopher Morahan
- Successor: Keith Williams
- Children: Simon Cellan Jones; Rory Cellan-Jones; Deiniol Cellan Jones; Lavinia Cellan Jones

Alan James Gwynne Cellan Jones (13 July 1931 – 30 August 2019) was a Welsh television and film director. From 1963, he directed over 50 television series and films, specialising in dramas.

He was particularly associated with the "Classic Serial" during the golden age of BBC drama, and some of his most significant work was in televising late 19th-century and 20th-century British literary works. Two of his most ambitious and successful directorial adaptations were the miniseries The Forsyte Saga (1967), which became a national and international hit, and Fortunes of War (1987); and he was also known for his award-winning productions of Jennie: Lady Randolph Churchill (1974) and Harnessing Peacocks (1993).

Cellan Jones was Head of Plays at BBC Television, chairman of BAFTA, and chairman of the Directors Guild of Great Britain.

== Early life and education ==
James Cellan Jones was born in 1931 in Swansea, Wales, the son of surgeon Cecil Cellan-Jones and his wife Lavinia (née Dailey). James later dropped the hyphen in his surname.

He was educated in England, attending the Dragon School in Oxford, and Charterhouse School in Surrey. From a family of physicians, he studied natural sciences at St John's College, Cambridge, where he received his BA in 1952, later raised to an MA in 1978.

== Career ==
Cellan Jones's true interest was acting and directing rather than medicine, however, and he began working at BBC Television in 1955 as a callboy, and rose steadily to become a production manager. In 1960 he began directing for the BBC, and by 1965 was directing several major productions a year. In 1967, he directed seven episodes of the award-winning 26-part adaptation of The Forsyte Saga, which became a massive national and international hit; and his other period dramas included numerous adaptations of works by Henry James and George Bernard Shaw. In the 1970s, he directed two notable historical biographical sagas: the award-winning miniseries Jennie: Lady Randolph Churchill (1976), and the 13-episode miniseries The Adams Chronicles (1976), about the American Adams political family.

From 1976 to 1979, Cellan Jones was Head of Plays at the BBC, where he was responsible for up to 85 productions a year. Upon leaving the post, he became a freelance television director, and continued to work steadily for 20 years. Highlights of this period include the World War II miniseries Fortunes of War (1987) starring Kenneth Branagh and Emma Thompson, and the award-winning television film Harnessing Peacocks (1993).

Cellan Jones was chairman of BAFTA from 1983 to 1985. He was also chairman and honorary president of the Directors Guild of Great Britain.

== Awards and nominations ==
For the miniseries Jennie: Lady Randolph Churchill (1974), Cellan Jones won the Directors Guild of America Award for Outstanding Directing – Drama Series, and was nominated for a Primetime Emmy Award. For The Adams Chronicles (1976) he was nominated for the Directors Guild of America Award for Outstanding Directing – Drama Series, and was nominated two years successively for the Primetime Emmy Award for Outstanding Limited Series.

He received the CableACE Award in 1987 for Best Dramatic Series for his anthology series Oxbridge Blues, first transmitted in the UK in late 1984. His television film Harnessing Peacocks (1993) won the prestigious Golden Nymph award for Best Television Film at the Monte-Carlo Television Festival.

Cellan Jones received seven BAFTA TV nominations, for Roads to Freedom (miniseries, 1970); Eyeless in Gaza (miniseries, 1971); Jennie: Lady Randolph Churchill (miniseries, 1974); A Fine Romance (series, 1981, 1982), which won the Broadcasting Press Guild award for Best Comedy in 1982; Oxbridge Blues (anthology, eponymous episode, 1984); and Fortunes of War (miniseries, 1987).

== Personal life ==
Cellan Jones married television editor and production manager Margot Eavis in 1959, and they had two sons, Simon Cellan Jones, a director, born in 1963; and Deiniol Cellan Jones, a barrister born 1965 who died in November 2013; and a daughter, Lavinia Cellan Jones, born in 1967.

BBC journalist Rory Cellan-Jones is also his son, by Sylvia Rich, a BBC secretary, prior to James' marriage to Margot Eavis.

He died following a stroke in August 2019.

== Selected filmography ==
- Esther Waters (TV series, 1964, 4 episodes)
- The Ambassadors (TV movie, 1965)
- The Scarlet and the Black (TV miniseries, 1965)
- An Enemy of the State (TV miniseries, 1965)
- The Hunchback of Notre Dame (TV miniseries, 1966)
- Quick Before They Catch Us (TV series, 4 episodes, 1966)
- The Forsyte Saga (TV miniseries, 1967)
- Z Cars (2 episodes, 1967)
- Albinos in Black (Theatre 625, 1968)
- The Portrait of a Lady (TV miniseries, 1968)
- Detective (TV series, 2 episodes, 1968)
- The Way We Live Now (TV movie, 1969)
- Solo (TV serial, 2 episodes 1970: "Little Gidding", "A Selection from E.E. Cummings")
- W. Somerset Maugham (TV miniseries, 2 episodes, 1969–1970)
- The Roads to Freedom (TV miniseries, 1970)
- The Piano (Play for Today, 1971)
- Eyeless in Gaza (TV miniseries, 1971), based on novel Eyeless in Gaza
- A Midsummer Night's Dream (Play of the Month, 1971)
- The Golden Bowl (TV miniseries, 1972)
- The Edwardians (TV miniseries, 1972–1973)
- Bequest to the Nation aka The Nelson Affair (1973)
- Away from It All (TV anthology, one episode: "A Work of Genius", 1973)
- Secrets (TV movie, 1973)
- Jennie: Lady Randolph Churchill (TV miniseries, 1974)
- The Adams Chronicles (TV miniseries, 1976)
- Caesar and Cleopatra (Hallmark Hall of Fame, 1976)
- The Madness (TV movie, 1976)
- Sea Change (Centre Play: Showcase, 1976)
- The Ambassadors (Play of the Month, 1977)
- You Never Can Tell (Play of the Month, 1977)
- Kean (Play of the Month, 1978)
- A Touch of the Tiny Hacketts (Play for Today, 1978)
- School Play (BBC2 Playhouse, 1979)
- The Day Christ Died (TV movie, 1980)
- C2 H5 OH (Play for Today, 1980)
- Unity (BBC2 Playhouse, 1981)
- A Fine Romance (TV series, 1981)
- The Kingfisher (TV movie, 1983)
- The Comedy of Errors (BBC Shakespeare, 1983)
- Oxbridge Blues (TV anthology, 4 episodes, 1984)
- Slip-Up (TV movie, 1986)
- Fortunes of War (TV miniseries, 1987)
- Arms and the Man (Theatre Night, 1989)
- The Bill (TV series, 5 episodes, 1989–1999)
- A Little Piece of Sunshine (TV movie, 1990)
- A Perfect Hero (TV miniseries, 1991)
- The Gravy Train Goes East (TV miniseries, 1991)
- Maigret (TV series, 3 episodes, 1992)
- Rumpole of the Bailey (TV series, 1 episode, 1992)
- The Brighton Belles (TV series, 1 episode, 1993)
- Scene (TV anthology; 1 episode, "Pig Boy", 1993)
- Harnessing Peacocks (TV movie, 1993)
- Class Act (TV series, 2 episodes, 1994)
- La musique de l'amour: Chouchou (TV movie, 1995)
- The Vacillations of Poppy Carew (TV movie, 1995)
- McLibel (TV miniseries, 1997)
- The Ruth Rendell Mysteries (TV series, 2 episodes, 1997)
- Holby City (TV series, 2 episodes, 2001)

== Bibliography ==
- Novel on the Screen (W.D.Thomas Memorial Lecture) (1992)
- Forsyte and Hindsight: Screen Directing for Pleasure and Profit. Kaleidoscope Publishing (2006)
- Heartsease (2014)

== Sources ==
- Who's Who in Entertainment. Marquis Who's Who, Inc., 1989. Volume 1, p. 106.
- "James Cellan Jones: Director." BFI Southbank: October 2010. pp. 18–20.
