= Nigel Williams (author) =

English novelist, screenwriter and playwright (born 1948)

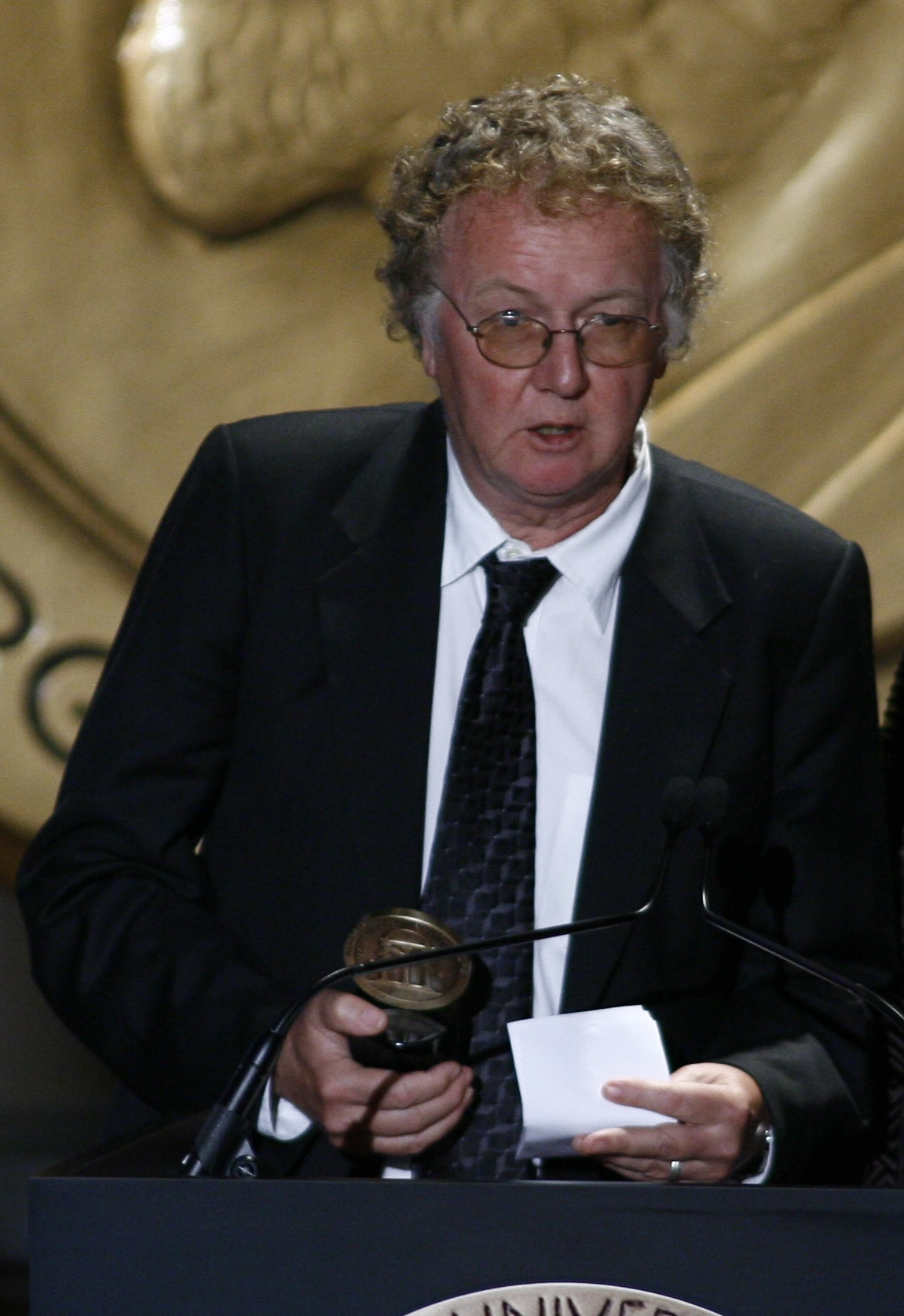
Williams at the 66th annual Peabody Awards in 2007

Nigel Williams (born 20 January 1948) is an English novelist, screenwriter and playwright.

== Biography ==
Williams was born in Cheadle, Cheshire, England. He was educated at Highgate School, north London, and Oriel College, Oxford, is married with three sons and lives in Putney, southwest London. After graduating from Oxford, Williams joined the BBC as a general trainee, and worked as an arts producer for the corporation, eventually becoming the editor of Omnibus and Bookmark.

His first novel My Life Closed Twice won the 1978 Somerset Maugham Award. For his screen adaptation of William Horwood's Skallagrigg (1994), Williams won a television BAFTA. Williams was also the primary scriptwriter for the second season – based on Greek myths – of the acclaimed Jim Henson's Storyteller series.

Williams was elected a Fellow of the Royal Society of Literature in 1994.

Williams' most successful work has been the 2005 TV drama Elizabeth I, being himself nominated for an Emmy Award for his script and winning multiple awards for the film and its star, Helen Mirren.

== Bibliography ==
=== Novels ===
- 1977 – My Life Closed Twice (Secker & Warburg)
- 1980 – Jack Be Nimble (Secker & Warburg)
- 1983 – Johnny Jarvis (Penguin, based on his teleplay)
- 1984 – Charlie (Methuen, based on his teleplay)
- 1985 – Star Turn (Faber & Faber)
- 1987 – Witchcraft, (Faber & Faber)
- 1988 – Black Magic (Hutchinson Novella)
- 1988 – Breaking Up (Faber & Faber, based on his teleplay)
- 1989 – Buttons in the Marsh (Faber & Faber, based on his stageplay)
- The Wimbledon Trilogy :
  - 1990 – The Wimbledon Poisoner (Faber & Faber)
  - 1992 – They Came from SW19 (Faber & Faber)
  - 1993 – East of Wimbledon (Faber & Faber)
- 1994 – Scenes from a Poisoner's Life (Faber & Faber)
- 1997 – Stalking Fiona (Granta)
- 1999 – Fortysomething (Penguin)
- 2002 – Hatchett & Lycett (Penguin)
- 2013 – Unfaithfully Yours (Corsair)
- 2016 – Waking Up Dead ISBN 978-1-250-09246-5

=== Plays ===
- 1974 – Marbles (Bush Theatre)
- 1976 – Square One
- 1976 – Double Talk (London)
- 1977 – Snowwhite Washes Whiter and Deadwood (Bristol)
- 1978 – Class Enemy (Royal Court Theatre)
- 1979 – Easy Street (Bristol)
- 1980 – Line 'em (Cottesloe Theatre)
- 1980 – Sugar and Spice (Royal Court)
- 1980 – Trial Run (Playhouse, Oxford)
- 1982 – The Adventures of Jasper Ridley (Hull)
- 1982 – W.C.P.C. (Half Moon Theatre)
- 1985 – My Brother's Keeper (Greenwich)
- 1985 – Deathwatch (Birmingham Rep)
- 1986 – Country Dancing (Other Place Theatre, RSC)
- 1987 – As it Was (Edinburgh)
- 1988 – Consequences (Croydon)
- 1988 – Breaking up
- 1989 – Buttons in the Marsh (Cheltenham Festivals)
- 1989 – Nativity (Tricycle Theatre)
- 1995 – Lord of the Flies (adaptation) (Other Place)
- 1996 – The Last Romantics (Greenwich)
- 1996 – Harry and Me (Royal Court)
- 2008 – MyFace (Cottesloe Theatre)
- 2009 – HR (five series comedy drama for BBC Radio 4)

=== Non-fiction ===
- 1993 – Two and a Half Men in a Boat (Hodder and Stoughton)
- 1995 – From Wimbledon to Waco (Faber & Faber)
