= From Wimbledon to Waco =

1995 travelogue book by Nigel Williams

- First edition
- Author: Nigel Williams
- Cover artist: Pierre Le-Tan
- Language: English
- Subject: Travel
- Publisher: Faber & Faber
- Publication date: 1995
- Publication place: United Kingdom
- Media type: Print
- Pages: 181
- ISBN: 0-571-17438-8

From Wimbledon to Waco is a 1995 travelogue book written by Nigel Williams describing his family's first visit to the United States. The Williamses do not live in Wimbledon, nor do they reach Waco, but as Nigel Williams explains in the last chapter of the book "I like the title..."

== Summary ==
The first two chapters deal with the journey from the Williams home in Putney, south-west London, to Heathrow Airport and arrival in LAX (Los Angeles International Airport).

The next two deal with their stay at the Chateau Marmont on Sunset Boulevard, a visit to Universal Studios and to a successful friend in Hollywood.

The next three chapters cover the journey by hire car through the Hopi Reservation in Arizona visiting Window Rock, Chinle, Canyon de Chelly, First and Second Mesa, Walpi and the Hopi Cultural Center.

Chapters 8 to 10 covers their journey from the Grand Canyon through to the Yosemite National Park via Boulder City (Nevada) and Caesars Palace in Las Vegas including a boating trip on Lake Mead.

Chapter 11 includes Jamestown (California), Columbia State Historic Park, the Napa Valley and Calistoga.

Chapters 12 and 13 cover San Francisco, including a trip to Pier 39, and the journey south to Los Angeles via Monterey.

The family then fly to New York City and the last three chapters include Darien and Mystic in Connecticut and Hancock (Vermont) and a stay at The Peninsula New York.
