= Andrea Morris =

Canadian actress

Andréa Morris
- Born: Andréa Morris; July 10, 1983 (age 43); Toronto, Ontario, Canada
- Occupations: Actress, Producer, Director, Author
- Years active: 1994–2016
- Website: BecomingMedia.com

Andrea Morris (born July 10, 1983) is a Canadian actress. She plays the role of quiet, shy, homeless girl Margaret on 7th Heaven. Her character was first introduced in the Season 11 episode "The Replacements", whom the Camdens eventually decide to take in.

Morris is a science and technology journalist, ongoing contributor to Forbes, and author of the book "The Science of On-Camera Acting" in collaboration with Dr. Paul Ekman which documents a neuroscientific perspective on how audiences perceive human emotion and expression filtered through the lens of a camera.

Morris produces semi-scripted comedies and science-based content for various television networks including Lifetime Network and is a senior producer of U.S. content for MBC Network television documentary series Moment showcasing global achievements in science and tech to inspire the next generation of women and men in the Middle East towards fields in STEM (Science, Technology, Engineering, and Math).

== Filmography ==
=== Film and television ===
Year	Title	Role	Notes
1994	Take Another Look	Sarah	Half-hour TV special
1995	Margaret's Museum	Marilyn	
1996	Road to Avonlea	Hannah Hubble	2 episodes
2003	Hangman's Curse	Crystal Sparks	
2005	Carnivàle	Opal	1 episode
2006–2007	7th Heaven	Margaret	17 episodes
2007	Fade	Heloise	
2008	Brothel	Maddy	
2009	Happy Face	Katie	Short film
2009	LA Sucks	Kinka	
