= Toby Eady =

English literary agent (1941–2017

- Born: 1941
- Died: 2017 (aged 75–76)
- Occupation: literary agent

Toby Eady (28 February 1941 – 24 December 2017) was an English literary agent, whose clients included Bernard Cornwell, Patrick Marnham, Rachel Seiffert and Jung Chang. When he set up his own agency, Toby Eady Associates, in 1968, his first book was Jack's Return Home by Ted Lewis, which was eventually made into the Michael Caine film, Get Carter. In 2015, Eady sold his agency to David Higham Associates.

Eady's mother was the author Mary Wesley. His father was Heinz Otto Ziegler, a Czech political scientist and Royal Air Force pilot. Eady was educated at Summer Fields School in Oxford, Bryanston School in Dorset, and read modern history at Wadham College, Oxford. He was survived by his widow, the writer Xinran Xue, whom he married in 2002. He had previously been married to Isobel Macleod.
