= Two and a Half Men in a Boat =

1993 travelogue by Nigel Williams

- First edition
- Author: Nigel Williams
- Language: English
- Subject: Travel
- Publisher: Hodder & Stoughton
- Publication date: 1993
- Publication place: United Kingdom
- Media type: Print
- ISBN: 978-0340590478

Two and a Half Men in a Boat is a 1993 travelogue book written by English novelist, screenwriter and playwright Nigel Williams describing his travel on the Thames inspired by Jerome K. Jerome's book Three Men in a Boat. The book has been described as"a whimsical account of a lazy trip up the Thames with friends" but was written to pay a tax bill of £28,000. Like Jerome, Williams travels in a skiff with his dog Badger and two friends, BBC executive Alan (Alan Yentob) and professional explorer John Paul, called JP. The book describes their journey, with frequent references to Jerome and his book.

At first, Alan is reluctant to go, but is persuaded to meet them halfway, after being promised the use of a mobile phone. JP is, as an experienced adventurer, comfortable with sleeping outdoors but the rowing takes its toll. They are at times towed, which makes Williams reflect on the morality of rowers being towed. Food and its preparation plays an important part, with a detailed description of how William's wife Suzan prepares a lavish picnic. Footnotes are used throughout, with the preparation of the above picnic placed in one footnote spanning several pages.
