= Brothel (film) =

2008 film by Amy Waddell

- Directed by: Amy Waddell
- Written by: Amy Waddell
- Produced by: Ira Deutchman; Wade W. Danielson; Amy Waddell
- Starring: Serena Scott Thomas; Brett Cullen; Grace Zabriskie; Timothy V. Murphy; Sarah Lassez; Yvonne Scio; Andrea Morris; Lisa Baines; Bruce Payne
- Cinematography: Seo Mutarevic
- Edited by: Daniel Lawrence
- Music by: Mark Adler; Anthony Marinelli
- Distributed by: Mount Parnassus Pictures; MovieHouse Entertainment
- Release date: February 27, 2008 (Sedona International Film Festival)
- Running time: 96 minutes
- Country: United States
- Language: English

Brothel is a 2008 film written and directed by Amy Waddell. The film stars Serena Scott Thomas, Brett Cullen, Timothy V. Murphy, and Bruce Payne. The film was filmed in Jerome and Clarkdale, Arizona.

== Plot ==
A young couple bought an old house in Jerome, Arizona which used to be a brothel. The husband commits suicide and the wife, Julianne (played by Serena Scott Thomas), attempts to come to terms with her loss and modernize the house. She 'finds the building is still inhabited by the ghosts of prostitutes' and 'that she is being stalked by Death himself (Bruce Payne)'.

== Cast ==
- Serena Scott Thomas as Julianne
- Brett Cullen as Avery
- Bruce Payne as Thief/Death
- Grace Zabriskie as Madam Lady Sadie
- Timothy V. Murphy as Gayle/Brian
- Sarah Lassez as Sophie
- Andrea Morris as Maddy
- Lisa Banes as Priscilla
- Yvonne Scio as Maddy

== Reception ==
John Reid, who reviewed the film for the Sedona Red Rock News, noted "the density of atmosphere and the intensity of the actors and crew palpable on the set". David Kanowsky, who reviewed the film for Kudos, stated that it was "a very fine ghost story without horror". A contributor to the Independent Film Quarterly described the film as "an erotic indie version of Inception." Steve Miller stated that Brothel "is a great haunted house movie that is rich in atmosphere from beginning to end, yet almost entirely free of elements that are typically associated with the horror genre – jump-scares, bloody gore, and characters doing stupid things just so the plot can keep moving." In his view, it is "a beautiful, well-acted film." Its rating on the Internet Movie Database is 3.6/10.
