= Tara Fitzgerald =

English actress

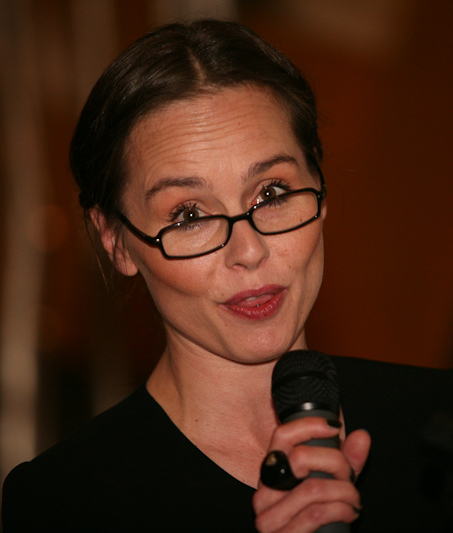
- Fitzgerald in 2012
- Born: Tara Anne Cassandra Fitzgerald Callaby; 1967 (age 58–59); Cuckfield, Sussex, England
- Occupation: Actress
- Years active: 1991–present
- Spouse(s): John Sharian (m. 2001; div. 2003) Edward Cartwright (2021–present)

Tara Anne Cassandra Fitzgerald (born 1967) is an English actress who has appeared in feature films, television, radio and the stage. She won the New York Drama Desk Award for Outstanding Featured Actress in a Play in 1995 as Ophelia in Hamlet. She won the Best Actress Award at The Reims International Television Festival in 1999 for her role of Lady Dona St Columb in Frenchman's Creek. Fitzgerald has appeared in the West End production of The Misanthrope at the Comedy Theatre, and in Henrik Ibsen's A Doll's House at the Donmar Warehouse. Since 2007, Fitzgerald has appeared in more than 30 episodes of the BBC television series Waking the Dead and played the role of Selyse Baratheon in the HBO series Game of Thrones.

== Early life ==
Fitzgerald is the daughter of artist Michael Callaby and Irish portrait photographer Sarah Geraldine Fitzgerald. She spent part of her childhood in the Bahamas, where her maternal grandfather ran a law firm. Her sister, Arabella, was born there. Following the family's return to England when she was three, Fitzgerald's parents separated, and her mother then married the Irish actor Norman Rodway. She has a half-sister from this marriage, Bianca Rodway. Her father, Callaby, died when she was 11. Her great-aunt was actress Geraldine Fitzgerald; other cousins through the Fitzgerald family are the Irish novelist Jennifer Johnston and Irish actress Susan Fitzgerald.

== Career ==
=== Film ===
Following her graduation from Drama Centre London, Fitzgerald appeared as the daughter of a beauty queen in the comedy Hear My Song (1991). She came to international attention in 1993 when she starred with Hugh Grant in the Australian film Sirens. The film landed Fitzgerald an Australian Film Institute nomination for Best Actress in a Lead Role. Two years later she again appeared with Grant in the comedy The Englishman who Went up a Hill but Came down a Mountain. Fitzgerald appeared in a steady stream of independent feature films through the 1990s and 2000s, among them A Man of No Importance (1994), Brassed Off (1996), the Czech World War II fighter pilot drama Dark Blue World (2001), and the 2004 drama, Secret Passage (UK title: The Lion's Mouth), set during the Spanish Inquisition. In 2006, she appeared in In a Dark Place, and, in 2014, she played Miriam in Exodus: Gods and Kings.

Fitzgerald decided to expand her career into directing after becoming frustrated with what she saw as a lack of interesting roles for older actresses. She was one of 12 filmmakers selected for Film London's 2015 Microwave scheme, which provides training and mentoring to filmmakers who then pitch their ideas to a panel that selects the two best ideas for production, with budgets of £150,000 each.

=== Stage ===
Fitzgerald's first major stage role came in 1992 when she appeared opposite Peter O'Toole in Our Song at the Apollo Theatre. She has alternated between stage and screen for almost two decades, with frequent theatre roles. In 1995, she starred as Ophelia in Hamlet at London's Almeida Theatre, which led to her American stage debut. The production transferred across the Atlantic and played more than 90 performances on Broadway at the Belasco Theatre.

Since then, she has played Antigone in a national UK tour and Blanche Du Bois in Tennessee Williams's A Streetcar Named Desire at the Bristol Old Vic and appeared in A Doll's House at the Donmar Warehouse. Fitzgerald has also appeared in Molière's The Misanthrope in 2009 at the Comedy Theatre (now the Pinter). She appeared in The Winter's Tale at the RSC in 2013, performed as Lady Macbeth at Shakespeare's Globe theatre and appeared in Gaslight at the Royal and Derngate Theatre in 2015.

=== Television ===
A veteran of more than twenty television programmes and mini-series, Fitzgerald has portrayed Victorian heroines and modern police detectives. Her first TV role was in the 1991 BBC production The Black Candle, set in Yorkshire in the 1880s. In 1992, she was featured in The Camomile Lawn. After her feature film success, she landed her first starring role in a television film, The Vacillations of Poppy Carew. She won Best Actress at the 1999 Reims International Television Festival for the costumes-and-pirates love story Frenchman's Creek. In 2006, she was featured in The Virgin Queen, before taking on the role of Eve Lockhart on Waking The Dead, joining that cast in 2007. She also had a recurring role on Game of Thrones, playing Selyse Baratheon. In 2020 Tara Fitzgerald played a role as Lady Templemore in the ITV-series Belgravia, a historical drama based on the 2016 novel of the same name by Julian Fellowes.

== Personal life ==
In 2001, Fitzgerald married the English actor-director John Sharian, who directed her in the short film The Snatching of Bookie Bob. They separated in May 2003 and later divorced.

She married English fund manager Edward Cartwright in 2021. They live in West London.

== Filmography ==
=== Film ===
Year	Title	Role	Notes
1991	Hear My Song	Nancy Doyle	
1993	Galleria	Marie	
1994	A Man of No Importance	Adele Rice	
1994	Sirens	Estella Campion	
1995	The Englishman Who Went Up a Hill But Came Down a Mountain	Elizabeth aka Betty from Cardiff	
1996	Brassed Off	Gloria Mullins	
1998	Conquest	Daisy MacDonald	
1998	The Snatching of Bookie Bob	Silk	
1999	New World Disorder	Kris Paddock	
1999	Childhood	Ange	
2000	Rancid Aluminium	Masha	
2001	Dark Blue World	Susan Whitmore	Czech title: Tmavomodrý svět
2003	I Capture the Castle	Topaz Mortmain	
2004	Five Children and It	Mother	
2004	The Lion's Mouth	Clara	
2006	In a Dark Place	Mrs. Grose	
2014	Exodus: Gods and Kings	Miriam	
2015	Child 44	Inessa Nesterov	
2015	Legend	Mrs Shea	
2015	We Are Happy	Rachel	
2016	Una	Andrea	
2019	The Runaways	Maggie	
2019	The King	Hooper	
2020	The Call Centre	Helen (Voice)	
2021	Miss Willoughby and the Haunted Bookshop	Diana Branson	
2023	The Undertaker	Vic	
2023	Luther: The Fallen Sun	Georgette	Uncredited

=== Television ===
Year	Title	Role	Notes
1991	The Black Candle	Victoria Mordaunt	Television film
1992	The Camomile Lawn	Young Polly	4 episodes
1992	Anglo-Saxon Attitudes	Young Dollie Stokesay	3 episodes
1992	Performance	Emily	Episode: "Six Characters in Search of an Author"
1994	Fall from Grace	Catherine Pradier	Television film
1994	Cadfael	Iveta de Massard	Episode: "The Leper of Saint Giles"
1995	The Vacillations of Poppy Carew	Poppy Carew	Television film
1996	The Tenant of Wildfell Hall	Helen Graham	3 episodes
1997	The Student Prince	Grace	Television film
1997	The Woman in White	Marian Fairlie	Television film
1998	Little White Lies	Beth Marsh	Television film
1998	Frenchman's Creek	Dona, Lady St. Columb	Television film
1999	In the Name of Love	Zoe Walters	2 episodes
2003	Murder in Mind	Liz Morton	Episode: "Echoes"
2003	Love Again	Monica Jones	Television film
2004	Agatha Christie's Marple: The Body in the Library	Adelaide Jefferson	Episode: #1.1
2005	Like Father Like Son	D.I. Harkness	Television film
2005	Rose and Maloney	Annie Sorensen-Johnson	Episode: "Annie Johnson"
2006	The Virgin Queen	Kat Ashley	3 episodes
2006	Jane Eyre	Mrs. Reed	4 episodes
2009	U Be Dead	Debra Pemberton	Television film
2007–2011	Waking the Dead	Eve Lockhart	42 episodes
2011	The Body Farm	Eve Lockhart	6 episodes
2014	The Musketeers	Marie de Medici	Episode: "The Exiles"
2013–2015	Game of Thrones	Selyse Baratheon	10 episodes
2016	Death in Paradise	Anouk Laban	Episode: "Dishing Up Murder"
2014–2016	In the Club	Susie	7 episodes
2017	Strike	Tansy Bestigui	3 episodes
2018	Requiem	Sylvia Walsh	6 episodes
2018	Origin	Xavia Grey	Episode: "The Road Not Taken"
2018	The ABC Murders	Lady Hermione Clarke	3 episodes
2020	Tangled: The Series	Zhan Tiri (voice)	2 episodes
2020	Belgravia	Lady Templemore	5 episodes
2022	Signora Volpe	Isabel Vitale	4 episodes

=== Theatre ===
Year	Title	Role	Theatre
1992	Our Song	Angela Caxton	Apollo Theatre (London) and UK tour
1995	Hamlet	Ophelia	Almeida Theatre (London) Belasco Theatre (New York)
1999	Antigone	Antigone	Old Vic, Yvonne Arnaud Theatre, Oxford Playhouse
2000	A Streetcar Named Desire	Blanche Du Bois	Bristol Old Vic
2004	A Doll's House	Nora Helmer	UK tour
2004	Clouds	Mara Hill	National UK tour
2005	And Then There Were None	Vera Claythorne	Gielgud Theatre
2009	A Doll's House	Christine Lyle	Donmar Warehouse
2009	The Misanthrope	Marcia	Comedy Theatre
2011	Broken Glass	Sylvia Gellburg	Vaudeville Theatre
2013	The Winter's Tale	Hermione	Royal Shakespeare Theatre Stratford
2017	Macbeth	Lady Macbeth	Globe Theatre London and UK tour
2019	Shipwreck		Almeida Theatre, London
2019	Prism	Nicola/Katie	UK tour
2020	Women Beware women	Livia	Sam Wanamaker Playhouse, London
2021	Hamlet	Gertrude	Young Vic, London
2023	Duet for One	Stephanie Abrahams	Orange Tree Theatre, Richmond
2024	Suite in Three Keys	Linda Savignac, Maud Caragnani, Carlotta Gray	Orange Tree Theatre, Richmond

=== Video games ===
Year	Title	Role	Notes
2018	World of Warcraft: Battle for Azeroth	Queen Mia Greymane (voice)	
2019	Anthem	Renda, The Argentum, Aruna's Mother (voices)	
