= Heinz Otto Ziegler =

Czech academic and RAF pilot

Heinz Otto Ziegler (1903–1944) was a Czech political scientist, who became an RAF pilot. He was killed in action in May 1944.

== Career ==
Ziegler wrote his doctoral dissertation for Heidelberg University in 1925 Die Bedeutung des geltenden Wahlverfahrens für die politische Struktur Deutschlands (The importance of the current election process for the political structure of Germany).

In the interval, he published Die moderne Nation. Ein Beitrag zur politischen Soziologie. (The modern nations: an account of political sociology), published by Mohr in Tübingen, 1931, and still held in most major research libraries. The work was reviewed in several academic journals. Subsequently, he published Autoritärer oder totaler Staat. (Authoritarian or total State) Tübingen: Mohr, 1932 and Die berufliche und soziale Gliederung der Bevölkerung in der Tschechoslowakei. (The professional and social structure of the population in Czechoslovakia.) Brünn: Rudolf M. Rohrer, 1936.

== Personal life ==
He was born to Alice and Ernst Ziegler, a wealthy Lutheran banker of Jewish descent. They later died after being interned in the Theresienstadt concentration camp. Heinz Ziegler escaped to England with his two brothers Paul and Hans where he was given a false identity and joined the RAF. He had a son Toby Eady with the English author Mary Wesley, who worked for MI5 during the war.
