= Serena Scott Thomas =

English actress and producer (born 1961)

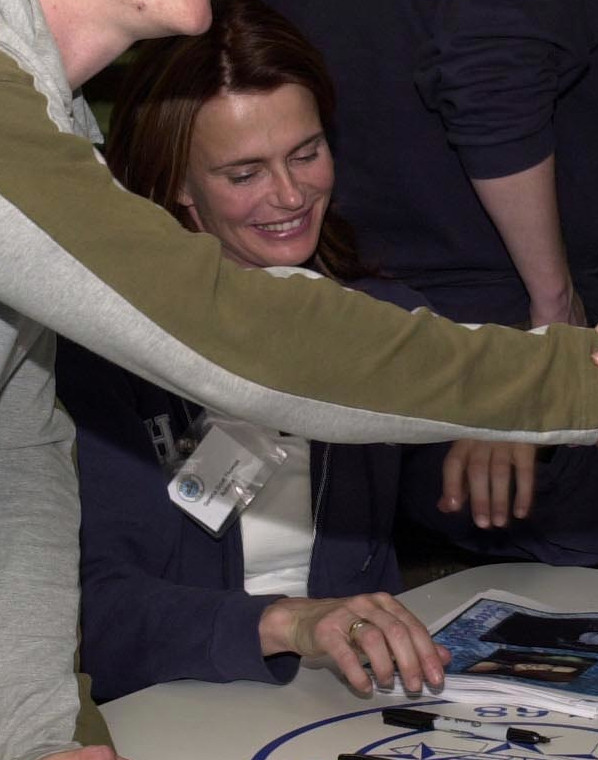
- At the premiere of Hostage in 2005
- Born: Serena Harriet Scott Thomas; 21 September 1961 (age 65); Nether Compton, Dorset, England
- Occupation: Actress
- Years active: 1990–present
- Spouse: Vincent J. Tortorich (m. 2024)
- Children: 1
- Relatives: Kristin Scott Thomas (sister)

Serena Harriet Scott Thomas (born 21 September 1961) is an English actress and documentary producer. Her television roles include Diana, Princess of Wales in Diana: Her True Story in 1993. Her film appearances include The World Is Not Enough (1999), Hostage (2005), Brothel (2008), and Inherent Vice (2014).

== Early life ==
Scott Thomas was born in Nether Compton, Dorset. Her mother, Deborah (née Hurlbatt), was brought up in Hong Kong and Africa, and studied drama before marrying her father, Lieutenant Commander Simon Scott Thomas, a pilot in the Royal Navy who died in a flying accident in 1966. Actress Kristin Scott Thomas is her older sister; she has two other siblings.

== Career ==
Scott Thomas is known for her portrayal of Diana, Princess of Wales, in the television mini-series Diana: Her True Story (1993), and for playing the lead in the TV film Harnessing Peacocks (1993) she was also a supporting character as Kelly Bridges, Nash Bridges's second ex-wife on the show Nash Bridges (1996–1997) and Dr. Molly Warmflash in the James Bond film The World Is Not Enough (1999). She played a villainous "watcher" in the Buffy the Vampire Slayer episode "Revelations" (1998) and also starred in the short-lived series All Souls (2001), as well as playing Bruce Willis's wife in the film Hostage (2005). She appeared on the television shows Nip/Tuck and NCIS and starred in the film Brothel (2008). She played the role of Carole Middleton, mother of Catherine Middleton, in William & Kate: The Movie, a biopic of Catherine's romance with Prince William. Serena Scott appeared on Peacock's Days of Our Lives as Fiona Cook, mother of Xander Cook.

== Filmography ==
=== Film ===
| Year | Title | Role | Notes |
|---|---|---|---|
| 1991 | Let Him Have It | Stella | |
| 1993 | Diana: Her True Story | Diana, Princess of Wales | |
| 1993 | Harnessing Peacocks | Hebe | |
| 1994 | Bermuda Grace | Kathy Madeira | |
| 1994 | Sherwood's Travels | Marian Sherwood | |
| 1995 | The Way to Dusty Death | Alexis Dunetskaya | |
| 1998 | Relax...It's Just Sex | Megan Pillsbury | |
| 1999 | The World Is Not Enough | Dr. Molly Warmflash | |
| 2000 | Skeleton Woman | Anna | |
| 2002 | Code Hunter | Dr. Valerie Harman | |
| 2004 | Haven | Mrs. Allen | |
| 2005 | Hostage | Jane Talley | |
| 2006 | The Thirst | Mariel | |
| 2008 | Brothel | Julianne | |
| 2011 | William & Kate: The Movie | Carole Middleton | |
| 2014 | Inherent Vice | Sloane Wolfmann | |
| 2019 | Fat: A Documentary | Producer | |
| 2020 | Rolling Thunder | Iris | |
| 2021 | Fat: A Documentary 2 | Producer | |
| 2022 | Beyond Impossible | Producer | |

=== Television ===
- Headhunters as Miranda (1994)
- Nash Bridges as Kelly Bridges (1996, 1997)
- Nostromo (1996)
- Buffy the Vampire Slayer (1998)
- All Souls (2001)
- The Agency (2002)
- The Division (2003)
- She Spies (2003)
- Over There (2005)
- Freddie (2006)
- Wicked Wicked Games (2006–07)
- NCIS (2007)
- Nip/Tuck (2007)
- Rizzoli & Isles (2016)
- Scorpion (2017)
- Days of Our Lives (2024-)
