= Harnessing Peacocks =

1985 novel by Mary Wesley

- First edition
- Author: Mary Wesley
- Language: English
- Publisher: Macmillan
- Publication date: 1985
- Publication place: United Kingdom
- Media type: Print
- Pages: 288
- ISBN: 0-333-39386-4

Harnessing Peacocks is the third novel by Mary Wesley, published in 1985 when the author was 73 years old. In 1992 it was adapted for television.

== Plot summary ==
As a baby, Hebe lost her parents in an air crash; her grandparents have brought her up. When she, to her surprise, learns that she is pregnant, her grandparents and older siblings arrange an abortion to eliminate the social nuisance. Hebe overhears their plans and flees her grandparents' home for good.

Twelve years later Hebe is living alone in a small town in the West Country and her son, Silas, is attending a posh private school. To make a living Hebe is working as a cook for elderly ladies and supplementing the income by sleeping with their sons and sons-in-law.

In the meantime forces threaten her lucrative and well-structured life. Silas's father (unknown to Hebe) is looking for her; Silas is on vacation with the sons of one of her clients; the local hatter falls in love with Hebe; Silas hates his school; one of her clients wants to marry her and begins stalking her; and Hebe's grandparents become involved in a road accident.

== List of characters ==
- Hebe: aged thirty, single mother of Silas who fled home from Italy when she became pregnant, now lives in Cornwall and works as a part-time cook and part-time prostitute.
- Silas: Hebe's twelve-year-old son, attending a smart private school
- Christopher and Eileen Rutter: Hebe's grandparents, from whom she is estranged
- Ann, Beata and Cara: Hebe's older sisters
- Robert, Delian and Marcus: Hebe's brothers-in-law
- Jim Huxtable: the (unknown) father of Silas who owns a coffee shop which sells antiques
- Rory Grant: a hatter in Salisbury, in love with Hebe
- Louisa Fox: One of Hebe's old lady employers, also Rory Grant's aunt
- Hannah Somerton: a friend of Hebe who lives in the same street
- Giles: Hannah Somerton's son
- George Scoop: a dentist, Hannah Somerton's boyfriend
- Lucy Duff: one of Hebe's employers
- Mungo Duff: son of Lucy Duff and one of Hebe's clients
- Alison Duff: Mungo's wife
- Alistair and Ian Duff: Mungo and Alison Duff's sons
- (Aunt) Amy Tremayne: A friend of Hebe who used to work for Hebe's grandparents. When Hebe came home from Italy, Amy took her in.
- Miss Thomson: Lucy Duff's live-in housekeeper
- Bernard Quigley: a hermit and retired antique dealer, in his youth a Don Juan who pursued Amy Tremayne, Louisa Fox, Lucy Duff and Eileen Rutter, all at the same time
- Michael Reeves: a school friend of Silas
- Jennifer and Julian Reeves: Michael Reeves's rich parents, they invite Silas to join them on their holidays
- Eli and Patsy Drew: an American couple with whom Alison has an affair
- Terry: One of Hebe's former and satisfied clients

== TV Adaptation ==
Harnessing Peacocks was adapted for TV in 1992, directed by James Cellan Jones and starring Serena Scott Thomas as Hebe.

== Reception ==
Thomas Hinde of the Sunday Telegraph described the novel as 'Delightful, intelligent entertainment'. Susan Hill of Good Housekeeping goes on to praise the author, 'Mary Wesley goes from strength to strength...She has a great zest for life...The book is tremendously lively, very funny, spirited'.

== Themes ==
One of Wesley's major fictional themes is the affirmation of illegitimacy which appear repeatedly in her works. When Hebe becomes pregnant as a teenager her family arrange for her to have an abortion. However, Hebe wants to keep her baby and to do so she must flee her grandparents´ house, and her flight marks the definitive break with her family.

The heroines in Wesley's novels always have a complicated relationship with their families. The older generation will often appear class conscious and racist. When Hebe, to her surprise, learns that she is pregnant, her grandfather's reaction is: "Who is the man?... A long-haired layabout...Probably a Communist...Must have an abortion...Might be black". Hebe's family is not concerned about her or the child she is expecting; what they are concerned about is the social embarrassment and nuisance a pregnancy will bring.

== Possible Biographical References ==
Mary Wesley always rejected the suggestion of any connection between her own personal life and her fiction. However, she identified the appalling grandparents in Harnessing Peacocks, who bully the pregnant Hebe, as the nearest she came to a portrait of her own parents in old age.
