= Part of the Furniture =

1997 novel by Mary Wesley

- First edition
- Author: Mary Wesley
- Language: English
- Publisher: Bantam Press
- Publication date: 1997
- Publication place: United Kingdom
- Media type: Print
- Pages: 256
- ISBN: 0-593-04115-1

Part of the Furniture (1997) is a novel by British author Mary Wesley. The novel was Wesley's last one, published when the author was eighty-five years old.

== Plot summary ==
Seventeen-year-old Juno Marlowe is in love with Jonty and Francis and has just waved them off to war (World War II) when the air raid sirens sound across London. Juno finds shelter in the house of a stranger, the frail Evelyn Copplestone. Juno spends the night with Evelyn and tells him the story of her life, and Evelyn decides to help her by writing her a letter of introduction to his family in the West Country.

Evelyn, who is ill, dies during the night of lung failure due to exposure to gas in World War I and Juno flees the house. Reluctant to join her mother who has emigrated to Canada, and having nowhere else to go, Juno soon finds herself on her way to the West Country to see Evelyn's family at a farm named Copplestone. The owner of the farm, Robert Copplestone, Evelyn's father and only relative, is short of labour and hires Juno as a landgirl.

Shortly after her arrival at Copplestone, Juno, to her surprise, finds out that she is pregnant. When her mother in Canada hears that Juno has given birth to a pair of illegitimate twins, the social embarrassment makes her break off any further contact with her daughter. Juno is left to fend for herself and the hard work at the farm helps her to blot out any unwelcome memories of her past. Gradually she learns to trust the other people at Copplestone, and the withdrawn and quiet Juno grows into an independent and determined woman, who is more than merely part of the furniture.

== Characters ==
- Juno Marlowe: 17. Her mother has emigrated to Canada and her only relative in England is Violet Marlowe.
- Evelyn Copplestone: Frail. Was gassed in World War I. The son of Robert Copplestone.
- Jonty: Francis's cousin. Gone off to war. Sort of a friend of Juno's.
- Francis: Jonty's cousin. Gone off to war. Sees Juno as part of the furniture.
- Violet Marlowe: A widow. Juno's interfering aunt.
- Margery Murray: Francis's mother and Susan Johnson's twin sister.
- Susan Johnson: Margery Murray's twin sister and Jonty's mother.
- Robert Copplestone: The owner of Copplestone. Widowed at eighteen. The father of Evelyn.
- Ann: The housekeeper at Copplestone.
- Bert: Works at Copplestone. Married to Ann, but split and lives in the farmhouse.
- Priscilla Villiers: 50, widow. An old friend of Robert's.
- Anthony Smith: Homosexual. In his twenties. Sent to Copplestone by Evelyn to help in the garden.
- Hugh Turner: Anthony's partner.
- John: The gardener at Copplestone.
- Mrs Hunt: Evelyn's neighbour in London.
- Sheena: Jonty's fiancée.
- Lily: Helping Ann with the housework.
- Victoria: Daughter of Jonty and Sheena.
- Inigo: son of Juno and ..
- Presto/Felix: twin of Inigo, son of Juno and ..
