= Mary Wesley =

English writer (1912–2002)

Mary Wesley CBE
- Born: Mary Aline Mynors Farmar; 24 June 1912; Englefield Green, Surrey, England
- Died: 30 December 2002 (aged 90); Totnes, Devon, England
- Resting place: Buckfast Abbey, Devon
- Occupation: Novelist
- Spouses: Charles Swinfen Eady, 2nd Baron Swinfen (m. 1937; div. 1945) Eric Otto Siepmann (m. 1952; died 1970)
- Children: Roger Swinfen Eady, 3rd Baron Swinfen; Toby Eady; William Siepmann
- Writing career
- Years active: 1969–2001
- Genres: Romantic fiction; Autobiographical fiction
- Notable works: Jumping the Queue; The Camomile Lawn; Harnessing Peacocks

Mary Aline Siepmann CBE (24 June 1912 – 30 December 2002), known by the pen name Mary Wesley, was an English novelist. During her career, she was one of Britain's most successful novelists, selling three million copies of her books, including ten bestsellers in the last twenty years of her life.

== Biography ==
=== Birth and family ===
Mary Aline Mynors Farmar was born in Englefield Green, Surrey, the third child of Colonel Harold Mynors Farmar, CMG, DSO, of Orchards, Bicknoller, Somerset, and his wife Violet Hyacinth, née Dalby, granddaughter of Sir William Bartlett Dalby. As a child, she had a succession of 16 foreign governesses. When she asked her mother why they kept on leaving, her mother reportedly told her: "Because none of them like you, darling."

Wesley had a lifelong complicated relationship with her family and especially with her mother, who had a sharp tongue. Following the death of her father in 1961, her mother said: "I'm not going to let that lingering death happen to me. When the time comes I'm going to crawl to the Solent and swim out." Wesley replied with feeling: "I'll help you".

Her family did not approve of her books. Her brother called what she wrote "filth" and her sister, with whom she was no longer on speaking terms, strongly objected to The Camomile Lawn, claiming that some of the characters were based on their parents. Wesley identified the appalling grandparents in Harnessing Peacocks, who bully the pregnant Hebe, as the nearest she came to a portrait of her own parents in old age.

=== Adult life ===
Lewis Clive fell in love with Wesley and asked her to marry him. In The Camomile Lawn, the character Oliver Ansty is a fictionalised version of Clive. Wesley's first husband was Charles Swinfen Eady, 2nd Baron Swinfen, with whom she had a son, Roger Swinfen Eady, 3rd Baron Swinfen; although her son Toby Eady, born in 1941, was initially known as the son of Lord Swinfen, Wesley subsequently admitted his father to be the Czech political scientist Heinz Otto Ziegler. Toby Eady was eventually the literary agent of her biographer Patrick Marnham. She next married Eric Siepmann and with him had a third son, William Siepmann. In 1970 Wesley was left impoverished by the death of Siepmann, and it was only then that she became an author, turning to writing as a way to restore her finances.

=== Final years ===
Only in the last year of her life did she agree to have her biography written. She cooperated fully with Patrick Marnham, on the condition that nothing would be published before her death. She provided her reminiscences from her sick bed, and commented: "Have you any idea of the pleasure of lying in bed for six months, talking about yourself to a very intelligent man? My deepest regret was that I was too old and ill to take him into bed with me." The authorised biography (published in 2006) is entitled Wild Mary, a reference both to her childhood nickname and to her sex life as a young woman, when she had many lovers. The biography holds nothing back. As Wesley stated: "It was a flighty generation.... [W]e had been brought up so repressed. War freed us. We felt if we didn't do it now, we might never get another chance." "It got to the state where one woke up in the morning, reached across the pillow and thought, 'Let's see. Who is it this time?'"

But Wesley finally did get tired of her wartime lifestyle, realizing that her way of life had become too excessive: "too many lovers, too much to drink...I was on my way to become a very nasty person". When her son Toby Eady read the book, he was so amazed at how much he did not know about his mother that he did not speak to anyone for a week.

Late in life Wesley ordered her own coffin from a local craftswoman and asked it be finished in red Chinese lacquer. She kept it as a coffee table for some time in her sitting room. She suggested that she be photographed sitting up in it for a feature in the magazine Country Living, but the idea was politely declined.

She was appointed a Commander of the Order of the British Empire (CBE) in the 1995 New Year Honours, for services to literature. Due to her association with the town of Totnes in Devon, Wesley was chosen in 2007 to appear on the 1 Totnes pound note.

=== Death ===
Wesley died from cancer on 30 December 2002, aged 90, at her home in Totnes, Devon and was buried beside her second husband in the graveyard of Buckfast Abbey.

== Writing style and themes ==
Her take on life reveals a sharp and critical eye which neatly dissects the idiosyncrasies of genteel England with humour, compassion and irony, detailing in particular sexual and emotional values. Her style has been described as "arsenic without the old lace". Others have described it as "Jane Austen plus sex", a description Wesley herself thought ridiculous. As a woman who was liberated before her time Mary Wesley challenged social assumptions about the old, confessed to bad behaviour and recommended sex. In doing so she smashed the stereotype of the disapproving, judgmental, past-it, old person. This delighted the old and intrigued the young.

In Wesley's books there are some references to her own life, although she denied that her novels were autobiographical. Her books usually take place in or around the everlasting house, the idyllic refuge, recalling her time with Siepmann, living in a remote cottage in the West Country. Other recurring themes such as the dysfunctional family, the uncertain paternity, the affirmation of illegitimacy, can also be linked to her own life. In addition, thanks to her flighty youth, sex would become her trademark in her books though she wrote about what went on in the head rather than a user's manual. Incest also plays a part in several of her novels, but Wesley never mentioned this as a feature of her own life. She may however have gained her insight from her years working as a Samaritan.

== Career and bibliography ==
=== Novels ===
She wrote three children's books, Speaking Terms and The Sixth Seal (both 1969) and Haphazard House (1983), before publishing adult fiction. Since her first adult novel was published only in 1983, when she was 71, she may be regarded as a late bloomer. The publication of Jumping the Queue in 1983 was the beginning of an intensely creative period of Wesley's life. From 1982 to 1991, she wrote and delivered seven novels. While she aged from 70 to 79 she still showed the focus and drive of a young person.

Her best-known book, The Camomile Lawn, set in the West Penwith area near St Buryan, although filmed on the Roseland Peninsula in Cornwall, was turned into a television series, and is an account of the intertwining lives of three families in rural England during World War II. After The Camomile Lawn (1984) came Harnessing Peacocks (1985 and as a TV film in 1992), The Vacillations of Poppy Carew (1986 and filmed in 1995), Not That Sort of Girl (1987), Second Fiddle (1988), A Sensible Life (1990), A Dubious Legacy (1992), An Imaginative Experience (1994) and Part of the Furniture (1997). A book about the West Country with photographer Kim Sayer, Part of the Scenery, was published in 2001. Asked why she had stopped writing fiction at the age of 84, she replied: "If you haven't got anything to say, don't say it."

In March 2024, it was announced Wesley's literary estate had been acquired by the London-headquartered company, International Literary Properties (ILP), for an undisclosed sum.

=== List of works ===
Novels for Children

- Speaking Terms (1969)
- The Sixth Seal (1969)
- Haphazard House (1983)

Novels for Adults

- Jumping the Queue (1983)
- The Camomile Lawn (1984)
- Harnessing Peacocks (1985)
- The Vacillations of Poppy Carew (1986)
- Not That Sort of Girl (1987)
- Second Fiddle (1988)
- A Sensible Life (1990)
- A Dubious Legacy (1992)
- An Imaginative Experience (1994)
- Part of the Furniture (1997)

Autobiographical

- Part of the Scenery (2001)
- Darling Pol : Letters of Mary Wesley and Eric Siepmann 1944-1967 (2017)
