= The Camomile Lawn =

Novel by Mary Wesley

- First edition (UK)
- Author: Mary Wesley
- Language: English
- Publisher: Macmillan (UK); Summit Books (US)
- Publication date: 29 March 1984
- Publication place: United Kingdom
- Media type: Print (hardback & paperback)
- Pages: 304 pp
- ISBN: 978-0-333-36892-3
- OCLC: 59093668

The Camomile Lawn is a 1984 novel by Mary Wesley beginning with a family holiday in Cornwall in the last summer of peace before the Second World War. When the family is reunited for a funeral nearly fifty years later, it brings home to them how much the war acted as a catalyst for their emotional liberation. The title refers to a fragrant camomile lawn stretching down to the cliffs in the garden of their aunt's house.

== Background ==
Mary Wesley began writing The Camomile Lawn after the death of her second husband left her destitute. She finished writing the book in 1983 and was persuaded to publish it by her editor James Hale. Parts of the book were based on Mary Wesley's early life; the house in Cornwall was based on Boskenna, the seat of the Paynter family, where Wesley spent much time as a young woman. After a coast guard fell to his death near Boskenna, Wesley suspected foul play and created a fictional version for her novel. Like Polly, Wesley worked for military intelligence during the war. The character of Oliver was based on her former boyfriend Lewis Clive while Max was based on Paul Ziegler (brother of Heinz Otto Ziegler), one of her friends whose parents were murdered in the Holocaust. Mary Wesley's sister quarrelled with her over the depiction of Helena and Richard Cuthbertson in the book, as she believed that they were based on their parents.

== Story ==
In August 1939, Oliver, Calypso, Polly and Walter are visiting their aunt Helena, uncle Richard Cuthbertson and their 10-year-old cousin Sophy who has been taken in by Helena and Uncle Richard. They are often visited by the twin sons of the local rector and by Max and Monika, a Jewish refugee couple from Austria, whose only son, Pauli, is in a concentration camp and who have been taken in by the rector. Young Sophy is delighted with the arrival of her cousins, especially Oliver. She is determined to run 'The Terror Run', a cliff path that the cousins race along at full moon, along with the grown ups. During a daylight practice run, the local coastguard exposes himself to her. Returning from fighting in the Spanish Civil War, a depressed and disenchanted Oliver has a changed outlook on life. He retains his crush on Calypso, who, knowing that she is not what Oliver is truly seeking, is determined to make the most of her beauty and marry a rich man. Sensible, intelligent, practical Polly is observant and eventually joins the War Office. It is implied that she is working for Military intelligence. Her brother Walter joins the Navy.

== Television adaptation ==
In 1992 the novel was adapted for television, independently produced by Glenn Wilhide and Sophie Balhetchet at ZED Ltd for Channel 4 and directed by Peter Hall. It was adapted by Ken Taylor and had a notable cast, including Felicity Kendal as Aunt Helena, Paul Eddington as Uncle Richard, Jennifer Ehle as young Calypso, Rosemary Harris as Calypso in old age; Tara Fitzgerald and Virginia McKenna played the younger and older Polly.

== See also ==
- List of topics related to Cornwall
