= Summer of the Seventeenth Doll (1964 film) =

- Based on: the play by Ray Lawler
- Written by: Ray Lawler
- Directed by: Mary Ridge
- Starring: Grant Taylor
- Country of origin: United Kingdom
- Original language: English

Production
- Producer: Cedric Messina
- Running time: 80 mins

Original release
- Network: BBC2
- Release: 29 October 1964

Summer of the Seventeenth Doll is a 1964 British TV adaptation of the play Summer of the Seventeenth Doll by Ray Lawler. It was done for Thursday Theatre.

It was Mary Ridge's debut as director.

== Cast ==
- Lyn Ashley as Bubba Ryan
- Madge Ryan as Pearl Cunningham
- Sheila Hancock as Olive Leech
- Ewen Solon as Barney Ibbot
- Grant Taylor as Ron Webber
- Hazel Coppen as Emma Leech
- George Roubicek as Johnny Dowd
- Anthony Coburn as Taxi driver
- Valentine Ashley as Newspaper Boy
