= Thursday Theatre =

British TV anthology series (1964–1965)

- Genre: Drama, Anthology, television plays
- Country of origin: United Kingdom
- Original language: English

Original release
- Network: BBC 2
- Release: October 8, 1964 – March 18, 1965

Thursday Theatre is a UK television anthology series produced by and airing on the British Broadcasting Corporation (BBC) from 1964–1965. There were twenty-three episodes which included adaptations of the play, The Cocktail Party, by T. S. Eliot, and the novel, The Wings of the Dove, by Henry James. The productions ranged in duration from 75 to 95 minutes.

Guest stars included John Hurt, Susannah York, Ralph Richardson, Patrick Macnee, Ron Moody and Margaret Whiting.

== Productions ==
This table is based on records in the BBC Genome archive of the Radio Times and the BFI database. Links to the original works from which the productions were adapted are provided in the Notes column, where available. The 13 productions missing from (or incomplete in) the archives are noted according to the TV Brain database.

Original UK transmission date	Title	Author	Producer	Director	Performers	Notes
8 Oct 1964	Captain Carvallo	Denis Cannan	Cedric Messina	Charles Jarrott	Patrick MacNee; Ron Moody; Barbara Jefford; Laurence Hardy; Ronald Lacey; Jo Rowbottom; Hugh Paddick	Adapted from the play. Not billed under Thursday Theatre in the Radio Times. Missing.
15 Oct 1964	The Cure for Love	Walter Greenwood	Cedric Messina	John Gorrie	June Barry; Terence Edmond; Marjorie Rhodes; Joan Hickson; Norman Bird; Daphne Heard; Helen Fraser; Graham Rigby	Adapted from the play. Billed under Thursday Theatre in the Radio Times only for the repeat on 21 Jan 1965. Missing.
22 Oct 1964	Any Other Business	George Ross and Campbell Singer	Cedric Messina	John Warrington	Maurice Denham; George Baker; John Bentley; Jean Anderson; John Sharp; Basil Sydney; Michael Collins	Adapted from the play. Not billed under Thursday Theatre in the Radio Times.
29 Oct 1964	The Summer of the Seventeenth Doll	Ray Lawler	Cedric Messina	Mary Ridge	Sheila Hancock; Madge Ryan; Grant Taylor; Ewen Solon; Lyn Ashley; George Roubicek; Anthony Coburn	Adapted from the play. Not billed under Thursday Theatre in the Radio Times (where it was titled in error as Summer of the Seventh Doll).
5 Nov 1964	Write Me a Murder	Frederick Knott	Cedric Messina	Alan Gibson	David Buck; Elizabeth MacLennan; James Villiers; Noel Hood; T. P. McKenna; Raymond Ross; Royston Tickner	Adapted from the play. Not billed under Thursday Theatre in the Radio Times. Missing.
12 Nov 1964	The Same Sky	Yvonne Mitchell	Cedric Messina	George R. Foa	Barry Foster; George Pravda; Hana Maria Pravda; Sandra Carom; Alan Baulch; David Cole	Adapted from the play. Not billed under Thursday Theatre in the Radio Times. Missing.
19 Nov 1964	Simon and Laura	Alan Melville	Cedric Messina	Christopher Morahan	Moira Lister; Ian Carmichael; Richard Briers; Henry McGee; Charles Lloyd-Pack; Molly Urquhart; Penny Morrell; Philo Hauser; Reg Lever; Bruce Wightman; David Jackson	Adapted from the play. Not billed under Thursday Theatre in the Radio Times. Repeated under Theatre 625, 6 March 1966.
26 Nov 1964	The Cocktail Party	T. S. Eliot	Cedric Messina	Naomi Capon	James Donald; Michael Bryant; Virginia Maskell; Daphne Slater; Nora Swinburne; Robert Eddison; Philip Locke; Hilary Sesta	Adapted from the play. Not billed under Thursday Theatre in the Radio Times.
3 Dec 1964	Murder Mistaken	Janet Green	Cedric Messina	Mary Ridge	Pamela Brown; Julian Glover; Philip Latham	Adapted from the play. Not billed under Thursday Theatre in the Radio Times. Missing.
10 Dec 1964	A Day by the Sea	N.C. Hunter	Cedric Messina	John Gorrie	Gwen Ffrangcon-Davies; Robert Flemyng; Rachel Gurney; Felix Aylmer; Laurence Hardy; Cyril Raymond; Peter Collingwood; Elizabeth Benzimra; Gerald Rowland; Gene Anderson	Adapted from the play. Not billed under Thursday Theatre in the Radio Times. Repeated 2 Sep 1965. Missing.
17 Dec 1964	Point of Departure	Jean Anouilh, translated by Kitty Black	Cedric Messina	Donald McWhinnie	Derek Godfrey; Jack MacGowran; Frances Cuka; John Hurt; Carmel McSharry; Erik Chitty; Jonathan Burn; Tina Packer; Jimmy Gardner	Adapted from the play. Not billed under Thursday Theatre in the Radio Times.
24 Dec 1964	The Young Elizabeth	Jennette Dowling and Francis Letton	Cedric Messina	Charles Jarrott	Valerie Gearon; Katherine Blake; Gwen Cherrell; Scott Forbes; Cyril Luckham; Michael Lynch; Michael Allaby	Adapted from the play. Not billed under Thursday Theatre in the Radio Times.
31 Dec 1964	When we are Married	J. B. Priestley	Cedric Messina	Vivian A. Daniels	Gwendolyn Watts; Gilbert Wynne; Marjorie Rhodes; Sian Davies; John Sharp; Avis Bunnage; Newton Blick; Noel Dyson; Glenn Melvyn; Mary Quinn; George A. Cooper; Clare Kelly; Robert James	Adapted from the play. Incomplete (only the final reel survives).
7 Jan 1965	Flowering Cherry	Robert Bolt	Cedric Messina	John Chaft	Bernard Lee; Margaret Tyzack; John Paul	Adapted from the play. Repeated 9 Sep 1965.
14 Jan 1965	The Wings of the Dove	Henry James, adapted by Christopher Taylor	Bernard Hepton	Rudolph Cartier	Susannah York; Wendy Craig; Edmund Purdom; Lana Morris; Frederick Jaeger; Joyce Carey	Adapted from the novel. Missing.
28 Jan 1965	Photo Finish	Peter Ustinov	Bernard Hepton	Naomi Capon	Paul Rogers; Robert Brown; James Maxwell; Simon Prebble; Peter Ashmore; Barbara Couper; Daphne Slater; Meg Wynn Owen; Alice Montego; Priscilla Morgan; Michael Bates	Adapted from the play. Repeated on BBC1 under The Wednesday Play, 21 September 1966. Missing.
4 Feb 1965	Johnson Over Jordan	J.B. Priestley, adapted by David Lyons	Bernard Hepton	Lionel Harris	Ralph Richardson; Rachel Gurney; Basil Henson; Oliver Johnston; Paul Eddington; George Moon; Hannah Gordon; Brian Badcoe; Terence Donovan	Adapted from the play. Repeated 12 Aug 1965.
11 Feb 1965	Naked Island	Russell Braddon	Bernard Hepton	John Gorrie	Ray Barrett; Alan White; Lewis Fiander; John Breslin; Barry Lowe; Burt Kwouk; James Bolam	Adapted from the play of the book. Repeated 16 Sep 1965.
18 Feb 1965	The Living Room	Graham Greene	Bernard Hepton	Herbert Wise	Paul Rogers; Robert Flemyng; Janet Kelly; Ann Tirard; Margot Van der Burgh	Adapted from the play. Missing.
25 Feb 1965	Traveller Without Luggage	Jean Anouilh, translated by Lucienne Hill	Bernard Hepton	George R. Foa	Richard Pasco; Lana Morris; Margaret Whiting; Reginald Beckwith; Peter Pratt; Madeleine Christie; Noel Hood; Clifford Earl; Terrence Hardiman	Adapted from the play. Repeated 19 Aug 1965. Missing.
4 Mar 1965	Celebration	Willis Hall and Keith Waterhouse	Bernard Hepton	Mary Ridge	Bert Palmer; Noel Dyson; Trevor Bannister; Angela Crow; Julian Somers; Brian Smith; Joan Young; Nancie Jackson; Jayne Muir; Jane Tann; Leonard Rossiter; Derek Smee; Jenny Oulton; Leslie Lawton; Linda Polan; Dudley Foster	Adapted from the play. Repeated 26 Aug 1965. Missing.
11 Mar 1965	The Kidders	Donald Ogden Stewart	Bernard Hepton	Alan Gibson	Nyree Dawn Porter; Rick Jones; John McLaren; Ann Lynn; Neil McCallum; Paul Maxwell; James Maxwell; Frank O'Keeffe	Adapted from the play. Missing.
18 Mar 1965	Anatol	Arthur Schnitzler	Bernard Hepton	Christopher Morahan	Robert Hardy; John Wood; Moira Redmond; Elvi Hale; Priscilla Morgan	Adapted from the play. Repeated under Theatre 625, 4 December 1966.
