= Summer of the Seventeenth Doll =

Play written by Ray Lawler

First edition

Summer of the Seventeenth Doll is an Australian play written by Ray Lawler and first performed at the Union Theatre in Melbourne on 28 November 1955. The play is considered to be the most significant in Australian theatre history, and a "turning point", openly and authentically portraying distinctly Australian life and characters. It was one of the first truly naturalistic "Australian" theatre productions.

It was originally published by Angus & Robertson, before moving to Fontana Press and then Currency Press.

== Plot ==
The play is set in Australia, in the Melbourne suburb of Carlton, in the summer of 1953.

Barnie and Roo have just returned from Queensland, where they have been working as sugar cane cutters. This is the period of “the layover”, five months of sex and fun which they traditionally share with two city women, named Olive and Nancy. This has been the pattern of the past seventeen years. As always, Roo has brought Olive a kewpie doll as a present – hence the title of the play. This is the summer of the seventeenth doll.

But things have changed. Nancy has married, so Olive has invited Pearl Cunningham – a rather hoity-toity woman – to take over as Barnie’s date; however, she makes the working-class Barnie feel that he is not good enough for her.

Also on the scene are Kathie "Bubba" Ryan, a 22-year-old girl who has been coveting Olive and Nancy's risqué lifestyle from her neighbouring house almost all her life, and Emma Leech, Olive's cynical, irritable, but wise mother.

As the play progresses, it becomes obvious that this summer is full of tensions. Roo and Barnie are feeling old. The new-comer Pearl is much less fun than her predecessor. And it turns out that Roo has had a bad season up north: he is broke and is forced to take a humiliating job in a paint factory. Meanwhile his mateship with Barney is under strain following a dispute between them back in the cane-fields.

Roo is tired. He can’t face another season of cane-cutting and he asks Olive to marry him and settle down. But Olive is furious. She wants her old life, her old freedom, back. For her, marriage is the very opposite of life.

In the final scene, the two men leave together, the summer prematurely ended. And we know that there will be no eighteenth doll. The party is over.

Summer of the Seventeenth Doll is part of a trilogy of plays by Ray Lawler generally referred to as his Doll Trilogy; the story of The Doll is preceded by the prequels Kid Stakes (1975), set in 1937, which tells the story of the first year of the tradition and the origin of the gift of the Kewpie doll, and Other Times (1976), which is set in 1945 and includes most of the same characters.

== Productions ==
=== Melbourne ===
The Summer of the Seventeenth Doll had its world premiere on 28 November 1955, where it opened at the Union Theatre in Melbourne. This production of the play was directed by John Sumner and featured the following cast:

- Roma Johnston as Pearl Cunningham
- Fenella Maguire as Kathy "Bubba" Ryan
- June Jago as Olive Leech
- Ray Lawler as Barney Ibbot
- Carmel Dunn as Emma Leech
- Noel Ferrier as Roo Webber
- Malcolm Billings as Johnnie Dowd

=== Sydney ===
The play opened in Sydney, approximately two months later, on 10 January 1956, this time with significant changes to its cast:

- Madge Ryan as Pearl Cunningham
- Fenella Maguire as Kathie "Bubba" Ryan
- June Jago as Olive Leech
- Ray Lawler as Barney Ibbot
- Ethel Gabriel as Emma Leech
- Lloyd Berrell as Roo Webber
- John Llewellyn as Johnnie Dowd

=== Country tour ===
On 28 January 1956 a thirteen-week country tour of the play was announced, commencing on 14 February. The play toured New South Wales and Queensland, returning to Sydney for an encore season, and featured the following cast:

- Yvonne Lewis as Bubba Ryan
- Jacqueline Kott as Pearl Cunningham
- June Jago as Olive Leech
- Robert Levis as Barney Ibbot
- Dorothy Whiteley as Emma Leech
- Kenneth Warren as Roo Webber
- Keith Buckley as Johnnie Dowd

=== United Kingdom ===
After the final Sydney show of the play's country tour, The Doll moved to the United Kingdom, where it spent two weeks showing in Nottingham, Liverpool and Edinburgh before opening in London on 30 April 1957, with the following cast:

- Fenella Maguire as Bubba Ryan
- Madge Ryan as Pearl Cunningham
- June Jago as Olive Leech
- Ray Lawler as Barney Ibbot
- Ethel Gabriel as Emma Leech
- Kenneth Warren as Roo Webber
- Richard Pratt as Johnnie Dowd

=== New York ===
Encouraged by its wholehearted reception in Australia and Britain, Summer of the Seventeenth Doll took a trip to America, where audiences and critics were rather underwhelmed with the production, most likely due to drastic cultural differences.. The play opened in New York City on 23 January 1958, with no changes made to the cast. Variety wrote "When Lawler finally gets around to it, along about the middle of the third act, “Summer of the 17th Doll" is a fairly absorbing play. The exasperating first act, however, and even much of the second act, are a staggering hurdle and probably limit this Australian import (by way of London) to a brief run. It’s a cinch to make money, though, if only on the prior film Sale, the Guild subscription support and sortie advance interest, and sale."

The Doll only ran for a five-week season in America.

However, in 1967, Summer of the Seventeenth Doll featuring an all-black cast, was produced to great acclaim as one of four plays in the inaugural season of The Negro Ensemble Company with an international bill that included Kongi's Harvest by Wole Soyinka, Song of the Lusitanian Bogey by Peter Weiss, and Daddy Goodness by American playwright Richard Wright.

=== Film adaptation ===
After continuing to tour Australia through 1958, Summer of the Seventeenth Doll was adapted by Leslie Norman for Hecht-Hill-Lancaster Productions – whose first film had been Marty with Ernest Borgnine – for United Artists in 1959. The film was retitled Season of Passion for the American market. This decision was severely lamented by some fans of the play, whose complaints were rooted in three essential criticisms:

- The "Americanisation" of the text, namely the casting of American actor Ernest Borgnine, who played his character (Roo) with an American accent. Others have thought the film was a recruiting film for migrants with the Englishman John Mills as Barney and Alan García as Dino, an Italian friend and fellow cane cutter who does not feature in the play. The female leads were played by Anne Baxter and Angela Lansbury, though the film featured many Australian actors.
- It was set in Sydney rather than Melbourne.
- The drastic changes to key plot points, namely the alternative, "happy" ending that the 1959 film adaptation entailed. This alternate ending was considered by some to be representative of a dire misunderstanding of the play and its message, and by others an attempt to make the film an international success at the box office and critical acclaim similar to the kitchen sink realism of Marty. The producers also added a comedy sequence where a young girl attempted to trick Roo in a tent at Luna Park.

Another account claimed the film did not work because of its accent, male lead and changes to the source material.

=== 1964 British TV adaptation ===
The play was adapted for British TV in 1964 as part of Thursday Theatre. The cast was:

- Lyn Ashley as Bubba Ryan
- Madge Ryan as Pearl Cunningham
- Sheila Hancock as Olive Leech
- Ewen Solon as Barney Ibbot
- Grant Taylor as Roo Webber
- Hazel Coppen as Emma Leech
- George Roubicek as Johnny Dowd

=== 1979 Australian TV adaptation ===
A version of the play was filmed in 1979, directed by Rod Kinnear.|

- Christine Amor as Bubba Ryan
- Sandy Gore as Pearl Cunningham
- Carole Skinner as Olive Leech
- Bruce Myles as Barney Ibbot
- Peter Curtin as Roo Webber
- Irene Inescourt as Emma Leech
- David Downer as Johnny Dowd
- Rowena Wallace as Presenter

=== Most recent productions ===
Notable productions include:

- 1965: Sydney's Q Theatre staged a production of The Doll, in which Ethel Gabriel, a member of the cast for nearly a decade, gave her last performance as Emma
- 1973: Sydney's Nimrod Theatre Company staged a production with Bill Hunter
- 1974: Queensland Theatre Company staged a production
- 1977: Melbourne Theatre Company revived the play as part of The Doll Trilogy (featuring prequels Kid Stakes and Other Times)
- August 1988: Brisbane's La Boite Theatre Company staged play, directed by Don Batchelor.
- 1983: Melbourne's Australian Nouveau Theatre (Antill) directed by Jean-Pierre Mignon
- 1985: Sydney Theatre Company revived the play as part of The Doll Trilogy directed by Rodney Fisher (which also played in Melbourne)
- 1988: Sydney Theatre Company production travelled overseas to New York
- 1990: Birmingham Repertory Theatre in the UK directed by John Adams
- 1995: Melbourne Theatre Company directed by Robyn Nevin, which also played a national tour through 1995 and 1996
- 2008: Brisbane's La Boite Theatre Company directed by Sean Mee.
- 2011: Belvoir production directed by Neil Armfield which toured Sydney, Melbourne (for Melbourne Theatre Company), Brisbane (for Queensland Theatre Company), Wollongong and Canberra through 2011 and 2012
- 2015: State Theatre Company of South Australia at the Dunstan Playhouse, Adelaide Festival Centre directed by Georgie Brookman
- 2020: State Opera of South Australia in Her Majesty's Theatre, directed by Joseph Mitchell
- 2026: Melbourne's Red Stitch Actors Theatre revived the play as part of The Doll Trilogy directed by Ella Caldwell.

== The iPad app ==
In 2013 Currency Press released an iPad app which charted the 57-year history of Summer of the Seventeenth Doll.

The app collated archival material from the first production on 28 November 1955 up until the most recent Belvoir production, which toured the east coast of Australia in 2011/12. Material was sourced from a range of archives and institutions along the east coast of Australia.

The app featured interviews with:

- Ray Lawler
- Neil Armfield – director of the 2011 / 2012 Belvoir Theatre production.
- Alison Croggon – theatre critic and playwright.
- Sandy Gore – played Pearl in the 1977 MTC production of The Doll Trilogy, which was the first time the three plays had been performed in repertoire.
- Steve Le Marquand – played Roo in the 2011 / 2012 Belvoir production.
- John McCallum – Theatre Critic for The Australian
- Travis McMahon – played Barney in the 2012 Belvoir production.
- Susie Porter – played Olive in the 2011 Belvoir production.

== Critiques ==
- "Gender and Genre: The Summer of the Seventeenth Doll" by Jane Cousins
