= Paul Carson (actor) =

Texan actor (1934–1989)

- Born: Robert Allen Carson; 18 August 1934; Mineral Wells, Texas, U.S.
- Died: 3 February 1989 (aged 54); Dallas, Texas, U.S.
- Occupations: Actor, linguist, waiter
- Years active: 1940–1975
- Spouse: Annette Groombridge (m. 1960; div. 1966)

Paul Carson (18 August 1934 – 3 February 1989) was American actor from Texas who had a brief career in the United Kingdom during the 1960s.

== Early life ==
His acting career began at the age of six, making his stage debut with the Fort Worth Civic Opera, playing Trouble in Madame Butterfly. After appearing in several films and radio broadcasts, he decided to give up the profession for good.

At age 12, Carson and his family moved to Europe as a result of his father serving in the United States Armed Forces. They stayed in Belgium, afterwards moving to Tokyo in 1951. After graduating from high school there, Carson became drama critic for the Nippon Times before returning to the States in 1953.

After serving four years in the United States Air Force as a Russian linguist (having studied the language whilst at university), he was talked back into acting by a film starlet.

== Career ==
Carson initially graduated with a Motion Picture degree from the University of California, Los Angeles (UCLA) and toured the States in a production of Maria Stuart, as well as appearing off-Broadway in Lady of Affairs. (Around this time, he was briefly engaged to the actress Kim Novak.) He then came to England in 1959 to study drama at the Royal Academy of Dramatic Art (RADA), graduating in 1961 and winning the William Poel Prize for verse speaking (being the first American to achieve this award).

Afterwards, Carson appeared in repertories at Liverpool and Birmingham, during which he replaced Ralph Nossek as Mathias in The Bells after the actor fractured his kneecap after slipping on an icy pavement in 1962. The following year, Carson appeared alongside Sir Ralph Richardson in Six Characters in Search of an Author at the Haymarket Theatre. This was followed by appearances in TV shows and films (see below).

Moving to New York in 1967, Carson resumed his acting career in theatre, partaking in productions including Hotel Universe, The Owl and the Pussycat, The Bashful Genius (at Philadelphia's Playhouse in the Park) and The Royal Hunt of the Sun (with the Cleveland Play House). From 1969, he was performing with the Missouri Repertory Company before retiring from acting in 1975.

== Later life ==
Carson then went on to work as a waiter at Gatsby's and L'Difference in NY before returning to Dallas in 1978. He became head waiter at Sarducci's Ristorante at the Harvey Hotel in Plano, working up until his death.

== Personal life ==
For a brief time, he was married to and divorced from author Annette Carson (née Groombridge).

== TV and Film ==
- Doctor Who (serial - Marco Polo) (2 episodes) (1964) - Ling-Tau
- No Hiding Place (1 episode) (1964) - Al Gordon
- ITV Play of the Week (1 episode) (1964) - A. G. Dawson
- Love Story (1 episode) (1964) - Studio type
- The Bedford Incident (1965) - Seaman 1st Class - Communications
- Thirty-Minute Theatre (play Emergency – Ward 9) (1966) - First Doctor
- A Countess from Hong Kong (1967) - Reporter
- You Only Live Twice (1967) - Astronaut - 1st American Spacecraft

While based in Britain, he played the "G Man", a slick detective who corrects bad shaving habits in commercials for razor brand Gillette, shown in cinemas and appearing on posters in retailers' windows.
