= Late Night Horror =

BBC TV horror series

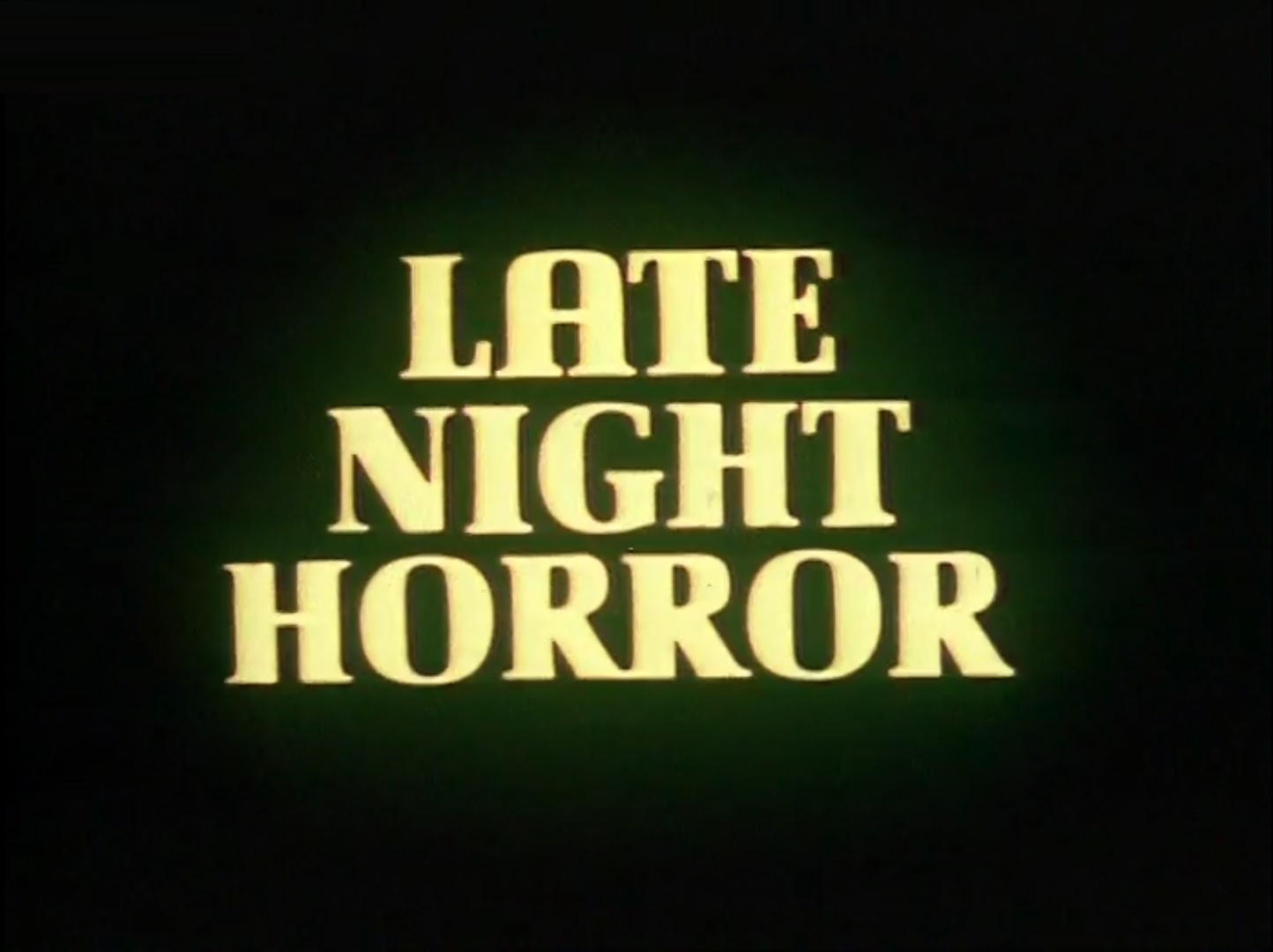
- Late Night Horror title sequence
- Genre: Horror
- Country of origin: United Kingdom
- Original language: English
- No. of series: 1
- No. of episodes: 6 (4 missing)

Production
- Producer: Harry Moore
- Running time: 25 minutes

Original release
- Network: BBC2
- Release: 19 April – 24 May 1968

Late Night Horror is a BBC horror series shown in 1968 over six 25-minute episodes.

An anthology of short horror stories, Late Night Horror was cancelled after six episodes due to complaints from viewers, and the majority of the series is now missing from the BBC Archives.

The only known surviving full episodes are “No Such Thing as a Vampire” and "The Corpse Can't Play".

== Episodes ==
No.	Title	Directed by	Written by	Original release date	Viewers (millions)
1	"No Such Thing as a Vampire"	Paddy Russell	Richard Matheson	19 April 1968	1.8
Alexis, the wife of Dr. Cheria, mysteriously falls ill, it's believed by the villagers that she is a victim of a vampire. One night, she awakes screaming with blood running from two marks down her neck. This episode was recovered as a 16mm black-and-white film telerecording in 2026
2	"William and Mary"	Richard Martin	Roald Dahl	26 April 1968	Unknown
A radiologist discovers a way of preserving the brain after the body has died. This episode is lost
3	"The Corpse Can't Play"	Paddy Russell	John Burke	3 May 1968	0.8
Ronnie's party is going well, but his mother Alice is waiting for her husband Tom to return from the office to help supervise. The doorbell rings, but instead of Tom it's Simon Potter, a strange little boy who Ronnie dislikes, and who knows some unusual and horrifying variations of children's party games. This episode was recovered as a 16mm black-and-white film telerecording in 2016
4	"The Triumph of Death"	Rudolph Cartier	H. Russell Wakefield	10 May 1968	0.95
Miss Pendleham has resided in a crumbling Elizabethan mansion for many years with rumours that the mansion is haunted. This episode is lost
5	"The Bells of Hell"	Naomi Capon	Robert Aickman	17 May 1968	1.0
After three months of marriage, Phrynne and Gerald Banstead stay at the Bell Inn, a picturesque pub in East Anglia. When they arrive, the place seems to be all but deserted apart from the lonely sound of a church bell. This episode is lost
6	"The Kiss of Blood"	Richard Martin	Sir Arthur Conan Doyle	24 May 1968	Unknown
Lady Sannox is one of the most beautiful and richest women in London. She becomes a mistress of Douglas Stone, an eminent surgeon. Her husband Lord Sannox watches this affair and seeks his swift revenge. This episode is lost

=== Archive status ===
The master 625 line PAL colour videotapes for all six episodes of Late Night Horror were either erased for reuse or junked soon after the series was repeated in 1970. Only the first and third episodes, "No Such Thing as a Vampire" and "The Corpse Can't Play", exist in the BBC Archives — albeit only in black-and-white.

All six episodes were thought lost until 2016, when "The Corpse Can't Play" was returned by Kaleidoscope/British Film Institute in the form of a 16mm black-and-white film telerecording made for overseas sales, but the programme was originally made using 2" 625 line PAL colour videotape. The episode was screened on 16 December 2017 at Missing Believed Wiped. A black-and-white film for "No Such Thing as a Vampire" was subsequently found ten years later by charity organization Film is Fabulous. Before the recovery of "The Corpse Can't Play", only the opening titles survived on a BBC Graphics reel. The original TV promo presented by Valentine Dyall was uploaded by Kaleidoscope to their YouTube channel in December 2020.

=== Home media ===
It was announced 15 February 2022 on Kaleidoscope's Facebook page that "The Corpse Can't Play" will be released onto DVD with a new HD transfer, restored colour and a book about the series. It was due to be released on 1 April 2022 by Kaleidoscope, but was delayed to 15 May. Kaleidoscope had exclusive rights until 1 September 2022.
