= Thirty-Minute Theatre =

British television drama series (BBC, 1965–1973)

- Opening title
- Genre: Drama; Anthology; Television play
- Written by: Various
- Directed by: Various
- Country of origin: United Kingdom
- Original language: English
- No. of series: 8
- No. of episodes: 291 (241 missing)

Production
- Producers: Harry Moore, Graeme MacDonald, George Spenton-Foster, Innes Lloyd & others
- Running time: 30 minutes
- Production company: BBC

Original release
- Network: BBC2
- Release: 7 October 1965 – 9 August 1973

Related
- Second City Firsts

Thirty-Minute Theatre is a British anthology drama series of short plays shown on BBC Television between 1965 and 1973, which was used in part at least as a training ground for new writers, on account of its short running length, and which therefore attracted many writers who later became well known. It was produced initially by Harry Moore, later by Graeme MacDonald, George Spenton-Foster, Innes Lloyd and others. Thirty-Minute Theatre began on BBC2 in 1965 with an adaptation of the black comedy Parson's Pleasure (author, Roald Dahl). Dennis Potter contributed Emergency – Ward 9 (1966), which he partially recycled in the much later The Singing Detective (1986). In 1967 BBC2 launched the UK's first colour service, with the consequence that Thirty-Minute Theatre became the first drama series in the country to be shown in colour.

As well as single plays, the series showed several linked collections of plays, including a group of four plays by John Mortimer named after areas of London in 1972, two three-part Inspector Waugh series starring Clive Swift in the title role, and a trilogy of plays by Jean Benedetti, broadcast in 1969, focusing on infamous historical figures such as Adolf Hitler and Joseph Stalin. Other plays were broadcast by writers like Charlotte and Denis Plimmer (The Chequers Manoeuvre, 1968), David Rudkin (Bypass, 1972, and Atrocity, 1973) and Jack Rosenthal (And for My Next Trick, 1972).

Thirty-Minute Theatre was cancelled in August 1973. Second City Firsts, also of 30 minutes duration, fulfilled much the same role.

== Archive holdings ==
Of the original 291 episodes, 241 are missing, one is incomplete and 3 exist on formats inferior to the original.

== Productions ==
Sourced according to the BBC Genome archive of Radio Times magazines, with additional information from the BFI database and TV Brain. All episodes were broadcast on BBC2. Identification of distinct series beyond the fifth is tentative.

| Original UK transmission date | Title | Author(s) | Producer | Director | Performers (non-exhaustive) | Notes | Archive status |
Series One
| 7 October 1965 | Parson's Pleasure | Roald Dahl, written for television by Philip Levene | Harry Moore | Herbert Wise | Richard Pearson, Derek Francis, Melvyn Hayes, Anne Blake, Malcolm Taylor | Adapted from the short story. | Missing |
| 14 October 1965 | Give the Clown His Supper | Gerry Jones | Harry Moore | Tina Wakerell | Brenda Bruce, Patrick Troughton | Repeated 3 July 1967. | Survives |
| 21 October 1965 | Portrait of a Madonna | Tennessee Williams | Harry Moore | Geoffrey Nethercott | Irene Worth, Thomasine Heiner | Adapted from the play. | Missing |
| 28 October 1965 | Pay As You Go | James Saunders | Harry Moore | Roderick Graham | Sarah Lawson, Norman Rossington, Brian Wilde | | Missing |
| 4 November 1965 | Monica | Pauline Macaulay | Harry Moore | Naomi Capon | Peter Cushing, Gary Bond, Anthony Sagar | Repeated on BBC1 21 March 1966. | Missing |
| 11 November 1965 | Love In Triplicate | Robert Storey | Harry Moore | George R. Foa | Bob Monkhouse, Joan Sims, Jacqueline Ellis | | Missing |
| 18 November 1965 | Application Form | Hugh Whitemore | Harry Moore | Piers Haggard | Denholm Elliott, Donal Donnelly | | Missing |
| 25 November 1965 | The Late Arrival of the Incoming Aircraft | Hugh Leonard | Harry Moore | Paddy Russell | Maureen Toal, Joe Lynch, Nigel Lambert, Kevin McHugh, Jacqueline Ryan | Repeated 17 July 1967. | Survives |
| 2 December 1965 | Mrs. Bixby and the Colonel's Coat | Roald Dahl, dramatised for television by Hugh Whitemore | Harry Moore | Naomi Capon | Shelley Winters, Neil McCallum, Bill Shine, Harry Towb, Mark Heath | Adapted from the short story. | Missing |
| 9 December 1965 | Mr. Ponge | James Hanley | Harry Moore | Geoffrey Nethercott | Marius Goring, Kenneth Griffith, Megs Jenkins, Mary Kerridge, Brian Wilde, Karol Hagar | | Missing |
| 16 December 1965 | That's Not My Name | P.L. Brent | Harry Moore | Piers Haggard | André van Gyseghem, Alfred Burke, George Murcell | | Missing |
| 23 December 1965 | Family Christmas | Jean Stubbs, dramatised by Jonquil Antony | Harry Moore | Mary Ridge | Madge Ryan, David Langton, John Gregson, Elizabeth Sellars, Calvin Lockhart | Literary | Missing |
| 30 December 1965 | The Passenger | Peter Van Greenaway | Harry Moore | Richard Martin | Bernard Lee, Margaret Tyzack, Anne Pichon, Phyllis Montefiore, Charles Cameron | | Missing |
| 3 January 1966 | The Flip Side | M. Charles Cohen | Harry Moore | Gareth Davies | Bob Monkhouse, Shane Rimmer, Donald Douglas | Repeated 31 July 1967. | Survives |
| 10 January 1966 | The Enchanted Night | Sławomir Mrożek, translated by Nicholas Bethell, adapted for television by George R. Foa | Harry Moore | George R. Foa | Dudley Foster, Richard Pearson, Margaret Nolan, Bernard Finch | Theatrical | Missing |
| 17 January 1966 | Four-Way Incident | Peter J. Hammond | Harry Moore | Piers Haggard | Lee Montague, John Franklyn-Robbins, Bryan Pringle, Jack MacGowran, Dan Meaden | Repeated 7 August 1967. | Missing |
| 24 January 1966 | Brothers | John Finch | Harry Moore | Michael Hart | Mike Pratt, Sonia Dresdel, Ann Firbank, Terence Brady | | Missing |
| 31 January 1966 | Janni… Oh, Janni | Alan Gosling | Harry Moore | John Gibson | William Lucas, Thomas Heathcote, Brian Smith | | Missing |
| 7 February 1966 | The Sugar Cubes | Stewart Love | Harry Moore | George Spenton-Foster | Oliver Maguire, Elizabeth Begley, Chris Gammon, Kate Story | | Survives |
| 14 February 1966 | Case Suspended | William T. Powers, dramatised by Owen Holder | Harry Moore | Tina Wakerell | Leo McKern, Max Adrian, Jane Hylton, Michael Rothwell, Edward Kelsey | From the story Allegory. | Missing |
| 21 February 1966 | Ships of the Line | Robin Smyth | Harry Moore | Ronald Wilson | Leslie Sands, Reg Lye | Repeated 14 August 1967. | Missing |
| 28 February 1966 | Keep On Running | Vickery Turner | Harry Moore | Michael Hart | Anneke Wills, Neville Smith, John Samson, Sally Goldie, Bridget McConnel, Annie Lee Taylor | | Missing |
| 7 March 1966 | Not for Just an Hour | Janet Fisher | Harry Moore | Mary Ridge | Victor Spinetti, Sheila Hancock, John Moore, Petra Markham, Ewan Hooper | | Missing |
| 14 March 1966 | 'Twas on a Sunday | Derrick Sherwin | Harry Moore | George Spenton-Foster | Billie Whitelaw, Alec McCowen, Margaret Denyer, Ella Milne | | Missing (closing titles survive) |
| 28 March 1966 | Magnolia Summer | Clancy Sigal and Vickery Turner | Harry Moore | James Ferman | Calvin Lockhart, Jennifer Clulow, Rick Jones, Andrea Monet | | Missing |
| 4 April 1966 | A Girl's Best Friend | Dawn Pavitt and Terry Wale | Harry Moore | Michael Hart | Faith Brook, Ray Brooks, Tessa Wyatt, James Chase, Kenneth McReddie | | Missing |
| 11 April 1966 | Emergency – Ward 9 | Dennis Potter | Harry Moore | Gareth Davies | Terence De Marney, Tenniel Evans, Arnold Ridley, Paul Carson | Repeated 10 July 1967. | Survives |
| 18 April 1966 | A Letter from the Country | Raymond Williams | Harry Moore | Toby Robertson | Emrys Jones, Ann Firbank, John Bailey, Clifton Jones, Phil Collins, Michael Goodliffe, Roy Evans, Malcolm Taylor | | Missing |
| 25 April 1966 | The Caramel Crisis | Simon Gray | Harry Moore | Naomi Capon | George Cole, Richard Pearson, John Le Mesurier, Bryan Pringle, Kynaston Reeves, Barbara Miller, Rosamund Greenwood, Edna Petrie, Winifred Dennis | | Missing |
| 2 May 1966 | Don't Go Down the Bingo Mother - Father's Come To Tea | Thomas Clarke | Harry Moore | Michael Hart | Patricia Burke, Timothy Bateson, Lois Daine, Chris Williams, Sally Thomsett | | Missing |
| 9 May 1966 | The House Mouse | Peter Lewis | Harry Moore | June Wyndham Davies | Julia Foster, Keith Barron | | Survives |
| 16 May 1966 | The Hard Word | Jim Allen | Harry Moore | Ridley Scott | Jack Woolgar, Tony Selby, Iain Anders, Jeremy Young | | Missing |
| 23 May 1966 | Ella | Rhys Adrian | Harry Moore | Waris Hussein | Vivien Merchant, Richard Pearson, Edward Woodward | | Survives |
| 30 May 1966 | The Window | Frank Marcus | Harry Moore | Michael Hart | Stephen Murray, Joseph Brady, Douglas Ditta | | Survives |
| 6 June 1966 | Friday Night's the Best Night | Victor Carin | Harry Moore | Peter Duguid | Milo O'Shea, Maggie Jones, Tim Preece, Gordon Reid | | Missing |
| 13 June 1966 | A Good Reason For Getting Married? | Marc Brandel | Harry Moore | John Glenister | Roy Castle, Nerys Hughes, Jessie Evans, John Scott Martin, Yvonne Antrobus | | Survives |
| 20 June 1966 | The Queen Street Girls | Clive Barker | Harry Moore | John Mackenzie | Keith Bell, Mary Henry, Reg Lever, Harry Locke, George Tovey, Ken Jones, Jo Rowbottom | | Missing |
| 27 June 1966 | They Put You Where You Are | Sheila MacLeod and Paul Jones | Harry Moore | Michael Hart | Lynnette Chappell, Stephanie Bidmead, Hubert Hill, Peter Cleall | | Survives |
Series Two
| 3 October 1966 | The Other Fella | Alun Owen | Graeme McDonald | Michael Hart | Keith Barron, John Collin, Geraldine Moffatt, Malcolm Taylor, Brian Osborne | | Missing |
| 10 October 1966 | The Devil and All His Mischief | Robin Smyth | Graeme McDonald | Bill Sellars | Sheila Hancock, Betty Marsden, Terry Scully, Victor Platt | | Missing |
| 17 October 1966 | The Spoken Word | Julia Jones | Graeme McDonald | Mary Ridge | John Barrie, Diana Coupland, Polly James, George Layton, Lewis Wilson, Kenneth Edwards | Repeated 18 September 1967. | Missing |
| 24 October 1966 | The Sounds Of War | Gerry Jones | Graeme McDonald | Piers Haggard | Renée Asherson, John Franklyn-Robbins | | Missing |
| 31 October 1966 | The Excavation | James Ferman, dramatised from The Gondola by Alfred Hayes. | Graeme McDonald | James Ferman | David Bauer, Natasha Pyne, Michael Gothard | Literary | Missing |
| 7 November 1966 | Play To Win | Dawn Pavitt and Terry Wale | Graeme McDonald | Douglas Camfield | Alethea Charlton, Mark Eden, Nancie Jackson, Kathleen Byron, Robert Mill, Gilly Fraser | | Missing |
| 14 November 1966 | Confession | David Weir | Graeme McDonald | Anthea Browne-Wilkinson | Nigel Stock, John Cater, Ewan Hooper, Mary Chester | | Missing |
| 21 November 1966 | Wife in a Blonde Wig | Fay Weldon | Graeme McDonald | Piers Haggard | Frances Cuka, Bridget Armstrong, Martin Jarvis, Terence Rigby | | Missing |
| 28 November 1966 | O-Goshi | Jack Trevor Story | Graeme McDonald | David Saire | Lee Montague, Norman Rossington, Rosamund Greenwood, Trevor Bannister, Vernon Dobtcheff | | Missing |
| 5 December 1966 | First Catch Your Hare... | Julia Jones | Graeme McDonald | Vivian Matalon | Eleanor Bron, Maureen Pryor, Peter Birrel | | Missing |
| 12 December 1966 | Brainscrew | Henry Livings | Graeme McDonald | Rudolph Cartier | Jill Bennett, John Osborne, Robert Robinson | | Missing |
| 19 December 1966 | The Towers Of Manhattan | Keith Dewhurst | Graeme McDonald | Herbert Wise | John Castle, Chela Matthison | Repeated 4 September 1967. | Missing |
| 4 January 1967 | Taste | Roald Dahl, dramatised by Derek Hall | Graeme McDonald | John Glenister | Donald Pleasence, Leonard Rossiter, Maureen O'Brien, Marion Mathie, Robin Hunter, Claire Nielson | Adapted from the short story. | Missing |
| 11 January 1967 | R.S.V.P. | Michael Ashe | Graeme McDonald | Peter Duguid | Patrick Allen, Bill Owen, Marie Kean, Ann Morrish, Gordon Reid, David Baxter | | Missing |
| 18 January 1967 | The Suede Jacket | Tim Aspinall | Graeme McDonald | Peter Dews | Richard Pearson, Eleanor Summerfield, Harry Locke, Daphne Anderson, Brian Tully | | Missing |
| 25 January 1967 | Oldenberg | Barry Bermange | Graeme McDonald | David Andrews | Frank Finlay, Mary Morris, Julian Glover | | Missing |
| 1 February 1967 | Later a Man Was Questioned | Jack Trevor Story | Graeme McDonald | Geoffrey Nethercott | June Ritchie, Robert Urquhart, John Carlin, Patrick Carter | | Missing |
| 8 February 1967 | Teeth | Tom Stoppard | Graeme McDonald | Alan Gibson | John Stride, John Wood, Andrée Melly, Yootha Joyce, Anna Wing | Repeated 28 August 1967. | Missing (extract survives) |
| 15 February 1967 | Turn Off If You Know the Ending | Anthony Bloomfield | Graeme McDonald | John Glenister | Janet Munro, Peter Barkworth, Sheila Grant | Repeated 21 August 1967. | Missing |
| 22 February 1967 | An Absolute Treasure | Peter Coke | Graeme McDonald | George Spenton-Foster | John Le Mesurier, Patricia Routledge, Barbara Lott, Tenniel Evans, Margaret Denyer, Seán Barrett, Mary Webster, Erik Chitty, Molly Hewett | Repeated 25 September 1967. | Missing |
| 1 March 1967 | Go Tell It On Table Mountain | Evan Jones | Graeme McDonald | Toby Robertson | Sylvia Coleridge, Judy Cornwell, Paul Daneman, Calvin Lockhart, John Quentin | Repeated 24 July 1967. | Missing |
| 8 March 1967 | Taffy Came To My House | Alun Richards | Graeme McDonald | Geoffrey Nethercott | Nerys Hughes, Clive Graham | | Missing |
| 15 March 1967 | Who Were You With Last Night? | Brian Phelan | Graeme McDonald | Michael Hayes | Valerie Gearon, Frederick Jaeger, John Standing, Mary Chester | Repeated 20 November 1967. | Missing |
| 22 March 1967 | Two and Two Are Twenty-Two | William Woods | Graeme McDonald | John Tydeman | John Woodnutt, Rachel Herbert, Timothy West, David Spenser, Tom Watson, Geoffrey Matthews | | Missing |
| 29 March 1967 | Wanted | John Finch | Graeme McDonald | Michael Hart | Edward Woodward, Hannah Gordon | | Missing |
| 12 April 1967 | The Gun | Eric Coltart | Graeme McDonald | John MacKenzie | Dennis Waterman, Jess Conrad, Geoffrey Hughes, Neville Smith, Eric Mason, Colin Spaull, Stephen Whittaker | | Missing |
| 19 April 1967 | Failpass | Brian Wright | Graeme McDonald | Alan Bridges | John Carson, Jennifer Daniel, Christopher Benjamin, Robert Lee, Brian Vaughan | Repeated 11 September 1967. | Missing |
| 26 April 1967 | Boa Constrictor | William Bast | Graeme McDonald | David Saire | Vivienne Martin, Frederick Bartman, Helen Downing, Bari Johnson, Ronald Lacey, Philip Locke, Gwen Nelson | | Missing |
| 3 May 1967 | The Isle Is Full Of Noises | Dawn Pavitt and Terry Wale, based on an idea by Tony Holland | Graeme McDonald | Mary Ridge | Nancie Jackson, Philip Stone, Diana Coupland, William Lucas, Peter Hobbs | | Missing |
| 10 May 1967 | Silver Wedding | John Bowen | Graeme McDonald | John Gorrie | Valerie White, Alan MacNaughtan | | Missing |
| 17 May 1967 | The Sufferings Of Peter Obnizov | Frank Norman | Graeme McDonald | Mary Ridge | Bryan Pringle, James Bolam, John Barrard, Petra Markham, Anthony Gardner, Charles Pemberton | | Missing |
| 24 May 1967 | Haven't You People Got Homes? | Tom Clarke | Graeme McDonald | Piers Haggard | Dilys Laye, Glynn Edwards, Kenneth Colley, Michael Brennan, Sydney Bromley | | Missing |
| 31 May 1967 | That Woman | James Hanley | Graeme McDonald | Geoffrey Nethercott | Nora Nicholson, Derek Francis, Paula Byrne, Lennox Milne | | Missing |
| 7 June 1967 | The Other Side | John Mortimer | Graeme McDonald | Tony Wickert | Beryl Reid, Nick Edmett, Kenneth Farrington | | Missing |
| 14 June 1967 | The Wake | Alun Owen | Graeme McDonald | Gareth Davies | Keith Barron, Alan Lake, John Roden, Pearl Hackney, Ilona Rodgers | Repeated 13 November 1967. | Missing |
| 21 June 1967 | Child Marlene | John Hall | Graeme McDonald | Gilchrist Calder | Lally Bowers, John Phillips, Bryan Stanyon, Amber Kammer, Patrick Jordan | | Missing |
| 28 June 1967 | Another Moon Called Earth | Tom Stoppard | Graeme McDonald | Alan Gibson | Diane Cilento, John Wood, John Bennett, Donald Eccles | | Missing |
Series Three
| 2 October 1967 | Leave Me Alone | Robert Gould | George Spenton-Foster | David Andrews | Julian Glover, Michael Standing, Melissa Stribling | | Missing |
| 9 October 1967 | The Timekeepers | Derrick Sherwin | George Spenton-Foster | Michael Hart | Moray Watson, Bernard Horsfall, Lyndon Brook, Eileen Colgan, Anna Perry, Derrick Sherwin, Roger Ostime, Geraldine Moffatt | | Missing |
| 16 October 1967 | You Meet All Sorts | Gwen Cherrell | George Spenton-Foster | Philip Dudley | Jane Downs, Johnny Briggs | | Missing |
| 23 October 1967 | The Tape Recorder | Pat Flower | George Spenton-Foster | Tony Wickert | Suzanne Neve, Guy Doleman | Repeated 4 September 1968. | Missing |
| 30 October 1967 | The Top Bunk | Ted Smith | George Spenton-Foster | Brian Miller | Brian Coburn, Patrick Westwood, John Moore, Douglas Blackwell, Anthony Hall | First Thirty-Minute Theatre listed in the Radio Times as broadcast in colour. | Missing |
| 6 November 1967 | Have It On the House | Paul Wheeler | George Spenton-Foster | Michael Hart | Donald Pickering, Jeremy Longhurst, Patrick Kavanagh, Patricia Fuller | | Missing |
| 27 November 1967 | Notice! Meeting in Progress | P. C. Jersild, translated by Claude Stephenson | George Spenton-Foster | Philip Dudley | Claire Nielson, Hugh Dickson, Noel Johnson, John Garvin, John Dawson, Will Stampe | Literary. Repeated 10 July 1968. | Missing |
| 6 December 1967 | A Time of Wolves and Tigers | Hugh Leonard | George Spenton-Foster | Hugh David | Cyril Cusack | Repeated 17 July 1968, and on BBC1 12 June 1970. | Missing |
| 13 December 1967 | The Keys on the Street | Charles Castle | George Spenton-Foster | William Slater | Ann Todd, Ray Brooks | Repeated 24 July 1968. | Missing |
| 20 December 1967 | Come Death | Peter S. Beagle, dramatised by John Wiles | George Spenton-Foster | Geoffrey Nethercott | Pamela Brown, Barrie Ingham, Felicity Kendal, Alexander Davion, Mary Miller, James Bree | Repeated 21 August 1968. | Missing |
| 27 December 1967 | The Metal Martyr | Robert Moore Williams, dramatised by Derrick Sherwin | George Spenton-Foster | Brian Hulme | Alex Scott, Geoffrey Matthews, John Gabriel, Barry Jackson, Jon Rollason, Elizabeth Proud, Will Leighton | Literary. Repeated 28 August 1968. | Missing |
| 3 January 1968 | A Private Place | David Campton | George Spenton-Foster | Gerald Blake | Patrick Magee, Sean Caffrey | Repeated 3 July 1968. | Missing |
| 10 January 1968 | The News-Benders | Desmond Lowden | George Spenton-Foster | Rudolph Cartier | Donald Pleasence, Nigel Davenport, Sarah Brackett | Repeated 7 August 1968, and on BBC4 5 June 2004. | Survives |
| 17 January 1968 | Diary of an Encounter | Leo Lehman | George Spenton-Foster | David Giles | Geraldine McEwan, Keith Michell | Repeated 14 August 1968. | Missing |
| 24 January 1968 | Lovely In Black | Maggie Ross | George Spenton-Foster | James Ferman | Elizabeth Shepherd, Ernest Clark, Eleanor Summerfield, Yolande Turner, Moray Watson, Tony Steedman | | Missing |
| 31 January 1968 | Happiness Is £ Shaped | Donald Tosh | George Spenton-Foster | Bill Craske | George Baker, Barbara Lott | | Missing |
| 7 February 1968 | Child's Play | Gerry Jones | George Spenton-Foster | John Matthews | Mary Webster, Tenniel Evans, Ian Ogilvy | | Missing |
| 14 February 1968 | Snakes and Reptiles | Tom Murphy | Innes Lloyd | David Andrews | Robin Ford, Jim Norton, Kevin McHugh, Donal McCann, Marnie Cahill, Dudley Sutton | | Missing |
| 21 February 1968 | The Unquiet Man | Michael Keir | George Spenton-Foster | Naomi Capon | Leonard Rossiter, Janet Webb, John Jefferson Hayes | Repeated on BBC1 24 July 1970. | Missing |
| 28 February 1968 | The Interview | Barry Bermange | Innes Lloyd | Donald McWhinnie | Brian Badcoe, John Bryning, Dennis Chinnery, Denys Graham, Richard Gregory, John Harvey, Noel Johnson, Sally Lewis, John Tucker | Repeated on BBC1 26 June 1970. | Survives |
| 6 March 1968 | Eveline | James Joyce, dramatised by Jeremy Paul | Innes Lloyd | Elsa Bolam | Sheelagh Cullen | Adapted from the short story. Repeated 31 July 1968. | Survives |
| 13 March 1968 | A Personal Affair | Maurice Edelman | Innes Lloyd | Alan Bridges | Leslie Sands, Ann Castle, Alan Rowe, Norman Mitchell, John Alderton | | Missing |
| 20 March 1968 | No Trams to Ethiopia | Barry Letts | Innes Lloyd | Adrian Rendle | Jack Hedley, Jan Holden, Francis Matthews | | Missing |
| 27 March 1968 | Father's Day | Jeremy Paul | Innes Lloyd | Elsa Bolam | David Carson, Mona Hammond, Anna Auland, Fulton Mackay, Daphne Anderson | | Missing |
| 3 April 1968 | Pleasant Dreams, Fernando | Rod Beacham | Innes Lloyd | Michael Hart | James Culliford, Anna Palk | | Missing |
| 10 April 1968 | The Sinner | David Hopkins | Innes Lloyd | James Cellan Jones | William Mervyn, Doris Hare, Geraldine Sherman, Chris Chittell | | Missing |
| 24 April 1968 | It's On You, John | John Lucarotti | Innes Lloyd | James MacTaggart | John Junkin, Scott Forbes, Jeremy Wilkin | First outside broadcast colour drama. | Missing |
| 1 May 1968 | Standing by for Santa Claus | Xenia Field, adapted for television by Charlotte and Denis Plimmer | Innes Lloyd | Michael Hart | Dennis Alaba Peters, Harry Fowler, Michael Gough, Roddy McMillan, John Moore, Derek Murcott, Michael Standing, Tim Wylton, James Appleby | Literary. Repeated 3 August 1969. | Missing (first reel survives) |
| 8 May 1968 | Empty Bottles | Robin Smyth | Innes Lloyd | John Matthews | John Ronane, Reg Lye, Tenniel Evans | | Missing |
| 15 May 1968 | Thank God For U.D.I.! | Frank Clements | Innes Lloyd | Oliver Horsbrugh | David Savile, Rudolph Walker, Louise Pajo | | Missing |
| 22 May 1968 | Still Death | David Rolfe | Innes Lloyd | Mark Cullingham | John Castle, Katharine Barker, Richard Woo, Jim Kennedy | | Missing (title sequence survives) |
| 29 May 1968 | Walk in the Dark | John Wiles | Innes Lloyd | Christopher Barry | Beatrix Lehmann, Maxwell Shaw, Cavan Kendall, Dallia Penn | | Missing |
| 5 June 1968 | The Boy's Room | Kon Fraser | Innes Lloyd | Geoffrey Nethercott | Robert Ayres, Brenda Peters, Wilfred Boyle | | Missing |
| 12 June 1968 | Remote Control | Hugo Charteris | Innes Lloyd | Alan Gibson | Malcolm Patton, Barrie Ingham, Jeremy Child, Chris Chittell, Grahame Mallard | Replaced scheduled screening of The Chequers Manoeuvre (see below). Repeated 12 September 1969. | Missing |
| 19 June 1968 | Number 30 Approximately | Laurence Collinson | Innes Lloyd | Douglas Camfield | Stephanie Bidmead, Patrick Whyte, Ursula Howells | | Missing |
| 26 June 1968 | A Question Of Honour | Don Shaw | Innes Lloyd | Geoffrey Nethercott | Nigel Green, Laurence Carter, Richard O'Sullivan, Anthony Gardner, Harry Littlewood, Alec Ross, John Carlin, David Morrell | Repeated 7 September 1969 and on BBC1 19 June 1970. | Missing (extract survives) |
Series Four
| 9 September 1968 | Baby | Ray Butler | Innes Lloyd | Elsa Bolam | Felicity Gibson, David Dundas, Irene Inescort, Peter Stenson | | Missing |
| 16 September 1968 | A Matter Of Principle | Maurice Edelman | Innes Lloyd | Oliver Horsbrugh | Griffith Jones, David Langton, Harriette Johns, Peter Barkworth, Angela Browne, Peter Whitaker, Jacqueline Bertrand, Graham Leaman | | Missing |
| 23 September 1968 | The Flag | P.L. Brent | Innes Lloyd | Malcolm Taylor | Edward Caddick, Peter Swanwick, George Pravda, André van Gyseghem, Leslie French, Joseph Fürst, Brigit Forsyth | | Survives |
| 30 September 1968 | The Chequers Manoeuvre | Charlotte and Denis Plimmer | Innes Lloyd | Christopher Barry | Ernest Clark, Derek Newark, Geoffrey Palmer, Anne Ridler, Michael Ripper | Originally scheduled for 12 June 1968, but postponed due to the Robert Kennedy assassination. | 16mm b&w film print |
| 7 October 1968 | Something to Hide: Part 1: The First Floor | Arden Winch | Innes Lloyd | Michael Hart | Charles Gray, Jennifer Wilson, Robin Chadwick, Edward Cast, Gordon Gostelow, William Franklyn | Repeated 6 July 1969 and on BBC1 15 May 1970. | Missing |
| 14 October 1968 | Something to Hide: Part 2: The Studio | Arden Winch | Innes Lloyd | Michael Hart | Charles Gray, Lyndon Brook, Robin Chadwick | Repeated 13 July 1969 and on BBC1 22 May 1970. | Missing |
| 21 October 1968 | Something to Hide: Part 3: The Caretaker's Flat | Arden Winch | Innes Lloyd | Michael Hart | Charles Gray, Gordon Gostelow, Robin Chadwick, Edward Cast | Repeated 20 July 1969 and on BBC1 29 May 1970. | Missing |
| 4 November 1968 | Of Public Concern | Don Shaw | Innes Lloyd | Geoffrey Nethercott | George Cole, Maurice Denham | | Missing |
| 11 November 1968 | Cause Of Death | Charlotte and Denis Plimmer | Innes Lloyd | Claude Whatham | Richard Vernon, Peter Welch, Kenneth Colley | Repeated 31 August 1969. | Missing |
| 18 November 1968 | The Last Victim | Leo Knowles | Innes Lloyd | Tristan de Vere Cole | Peter Dyneley, Martin Jarvis, John Bryans | Repeated 27 July 1969. | Missing |
| 25 November 1968 | Loving Israel | Laurence Collinson | Innes Lloyd | Michael Hart | David Buck, David Nettheim, Malcolm Reynolds, Vivian Brooks, Margery Mason | | Missing |
| 2 December 1968 | The Bishop and the Actress | William Douglas Home | Innes Lloyd | Geoffrey Nethercott | Anthony Nicholls, Celia Bannerman | Repeated 10 August 1969 and on BBC1 28 August 1970. | Missing |
| 9 December 1968 | Before Breakfast | Robert Rudelson | Innes Lloyd | Michael Bakewell | Dean Stockwell, Lelia Goldoni, Rudolph Walker, David Stockton | | Missing |
| 16 December 1968 | Cross Examine | John Foster | Innes Lloyd | John Matthews | John Breslin, Jean Marsh, Robert MacLeod, Garfield Morgan, Tenniel Evans, Mary Webster | | Missing |
| 23 December 1968 | Swallowing the Anchor | Frank Clements | Innes Lloyd | John Warrington | Leslie Sands, Stephanie Bidmead, George A. Cooper, Aubrey Richards | Repeated 24 August 1969. | Missing |
| 30 December 1968 | Game, Set and Match | Michael Page | Innes Lloyd | John Matthews | Colin Blakely, Ronald Lacey, Dennis Chinnery | Repeated 17 August 1969. | Survives |
| 6 January 1969 | Where Have They Gone, All the Little Children? | Charlotte and Denis Plimmer | Innes Lloyd | Philip Dudley | Michael Gwynn, Willie Jonah, Glyn Houston, Zakes Mokae, Elizabeth Bell, Hilary Minster | | Missing |
| 13 January 1969 | Absolute Aggers and Torters | David Hodson | Innes Lloyd | Derrick Goodwin | Amanda Barrie, Jeremy Lloyd, Saeed Jaffrey | Repeated 21 September 1969. | Missing |
| 20 January 1969 | These Men Are Dangerous: 1: Mussolini | Jean Benedetti | Innes Lloyd | Mark Cullingham | John Castle, Christopher Timothy, Leon Lissek, Oscar Quitak, Norman Mitchell, Gordon Gostelow | Repeated 22 August 1970. | Missing |
| 27 January 1969 | These Men Are Dangerous: 2: Hitler | Jean Benedetti | Innes Lloyd | Rudolph Cartier | Kenneth Colley, Ronald Lacey, Vernon Dobtcheff, Harold Goldblatt, Royston Tickner, Denis Cleary | Repeated 29 August 1970. | Missing |
| 3 February 1969 | These Men Are Dangerous: 3: Stalin | Jean Benedetti | Innes Lloyd | Henri Safran | Brian Cox, George Murcell, Michael Standing | Repeated 5 September 1970. | Missing |
| 13 February 1969 | Stake Money | Mark Lushington | Innes Lloyd | Eric Hills | Keith Baxter, George Sewell, Alan Lake, Ann Mitchell | | Missing |
| 20 February 1969 | First Confession | Nicholas Bethell, from a short story by Frank O'Connor | Innes Lloyd | Roderick Graham | Jack Wild, Eddie Byrne | Literary. Repeated 21 March 1970. | Survives |
| 27 February 1969 | The Boat to Addis Ababa | Gerald Wilson, from a story by Edward Etler | Innes Lloyd | Mira Coopman | Sandor Elès, Stanley Meadows, Murray Melvin, Miriam Margoyles | Literary | Missing |
| 6 March 1969 | A Hot Day | Janusz Wasylkowski, translated and adapted by Michael Hayes | Innes Lloyd | Michael Hayes | Lee Montague, Michael Williams | Literary. Repeated 7 March 1970 and on BBC1 4 September 1970. | Missing |
| 13 March 1969 | Roses, Roses, All the Way | Colin Morris | Innes Lloyd | Alan Bridges | John Collin, Robert Powell, Meg Ritchie | | Missing |
| 20 March 1969 | The Victims: 1: A Degree of Stress | Don Shaw | Innes Lloyd | Mary Ridge | Andrew Ray, Bernard Hepton, Lewis Wilson, Trevor Bannister, Lindsay Campbell | | Missing |
| 27 March 1969 | The Victims: 2: Frontier | Don Shaw | Innes Lloyd | John Glenister | Paul Dawkins, Anthony Dutton, David Pinner, David Barry, Richard Owens, Larry Dann, Tom Baker | Repeated 18 July 1970. | Missing |
| 3 April 1969 | The Victims: 3: Progressive Blues | Don Shaw | Innes Lloyd | Anne Head | Frances Cuka, Joe Melia, Clive Francis | Repeated 11 July 1970. | Missing |
| 10 April 1969 | Invasion | Barry Bermange | Innes Lloyd | Donald McWhinnie | Tony Bilbow, Michael Coles, Polly Elwes, Libby Morris, Denys Hawthorne | Repeated 5 June 1969. | Missing |
| 24 April 1969 | A Nice Cool Pad in the Sky | Graham Seal | Innes Lloyd | James Brabazon | Glynn Edwards, Donald Gee, Denise Buckley | | Missing |
| 1 May 1969 | Anything You Say | John Foster | Innes Lloyd | Rodney Bennett | Earl Cameron, Paul Hardwick, Clifton Jones | | Missing |
| 8 May 1969 | Conversation at Night | Friedrich Dürrenmatt, translated by Robert David MacDonald | Innes Lloyd | Rudolph Cartier | John Gielgud, Alec Guinness | Theatrical. Repeated 30 November 1969. | Missing |
| 15 May 1969 | Roly Poly | Stanisław Lem, adapted for television by Derek Hoddinott | Innes Lloyd | Michael Hart | John Alderton, Thorley Walters, Dudley Foster, Terence Brady | Literary. Repeated on BBC1 21 August 1970. | Missing |
| 22 May 1969 | ...And Was Invited To Form a Government | Charlotte and Denis Plimmer | Innes Lloyd | Mark Cullingham | Patrick Barr, David Langton, David Collings, Edward Evans | | Missing |
| 29 May 1969 | A Borderline Case | Robert Furnival | Innes Lloyd | John Warrington | Francis Matthews, Janet Chappell | | Missing |
Series Five
| 28 September 1969 | Gangster | Robin Smyth | Innes Lloyd | Michael Hart | Kenneth Cranham, Billy Hamon, Margaret Brady | | Missing |
| 5 October 1969 | Trial | Graham Seal | Innes Lloyd | James Brabazon | David Graham, Michael Robbins | Repeated 25 September 1970. | Missing |
| 12 October 1969 | A Formula For Treason | Charlotte and Denis Plimmer | Innes Lloyd | Oliver Horsbrugh | Peter Cellier, Ruth Trouncer, Leonard Sachs, Lisa Daniely, Christopher Burgess, Tim Seely | | Missing |
| 19 October 1969 | Someone's Knocking At Me Door | Robin Smyth | Innes Lloyd | Sue Amey | Harry Fowler, Rita Webb, Bryan Pringle | | Missing |
| 26 October 1969 | Trespassers | Allan Prior | Innes Lloyd | Christopher Barry | Norman Eshley, Zienia Merton, Susan Brodrick, Jeremy Child, David Billa | Repeated 15 August 1970. | Missing |
| 9 November 1969 | Aggers and Torters: Part 1: Back to Nature | David Hodson | Innes Lloyd | Rodney Bennett | Amanda Barrie, Roddy Maude-Roxby, James Villiers, Rosalind Knight | Repeated 30 May 1970. | Missing |
| 16 November 1969 | Aggers and Torters: Part 2: Psy-Fi | David Hodson | Innes Lloyd | Anne Head | Amanda Barrie, Roddy Maude-Roxby | | Missing |
| 23 November 1969 | Aggers and Torters: Part 3: Hickory Dickory | David Hodson | Innes Lloyd | Rodney Bennett | Amanda Barrie, Roddy Maude-Roxby, Betty Marsden, Jack Watling, John Witty | | Missing |
| 7 December 1969 | Lecture to an Academy | Franz Kafka | Innes Lloyd | Roderick Graham | Tutte Lemkow | Adapted from the short story. | Missing |
| 14 December 1969 | The Switch | Ewart Alexander | Innes Lloyd | Liz Small | Barbara Couper, John Castle | | Missing |
| 28 December 1969 | The Discharge Of Trooper Lusby | Robert Holles | Innes Lloyd | James Brabazon | Michael Trubshawe, Robin Bailey, Jack Woolgar, Michael Elwyn, Peter Welch, Terence Brady, Robert James, Stuart Saunders, Patrick Godfrey | Repeated on BBC1 18 September 1970. | Missing |
| 10 January 1970 | Laffin' Gas | Tony Perrin | Innes Lloyd | Brian Farnham | Joe Gladwin, Del Henney | | Missing |
| 17 January 1970 | The Chief Whip Sends His Compliments | Maurice Edelman | Innes Lloyd | Roderick Graham | Michael Aldridge, Sylvia Syms, Peter Howell, Edward Evans, Philip Bond, Raymond Llewellyn, Pauline Taylor, Antony Carrick, Salvin Stewart | | Missing |
| 24 January 1970 | Reparation | Robert Lamb | Innes Lloyd | Rodney Bennett | Sydney Tafler, Irene Prador, John Woodvine | Repeated 8 August 1970. | Missing |
| 31 January 1970 | The Scarecrows | Ewart Alexander | Innes Lloyd | Bill Craske | John Rees, Aubrey Richards | | Missing |
| 7 February 1970 | Laying It Off For Spangle | Alan McMurtie | Innes Lloyd | James Vowden | Julian Glover, Robert Cartland, Stacy Davies | | Missing |
| 14 February 1970 | Home Is Where You Hang Your Hat | George Layton | Innes Lloyd | Liz Small | Clive Revill, Maureen Pryor | | Missing |
| 21 February 1970 | What a Pity You Can't Stay Longer | Adeline Collier | Innes Lloyd | Henri Safran | Neil McCallum, Geraldine Moffatt, Donald Pickering, Janet Key | | Missing |
| 28 February 1970 | Out Of Sight, Out Of Mind | Frank Clements | Innes Lloyd | Robert Knights | Madge Ryan, James Cossins | Repeated 26 April 1971. | Missing |
| 14 March 1970 | Meanwhile, Back at the Office... | Derek Hoddinott | Innes Lloyd | Michael Hart | David Markham, Hilary Mason, Kara Wilson, Reginald Marsh, Frederick Hall | Repeated 30 August 1971. | Missing |
| 28 March 1970 | All My Own Army | Leslie Thomas | Innes Lloyd | Michael Tuchner | Michael Bates, Hubert Rees, Paddy Joyce, John Garrie, Jack Shepherd | Repeated 20 November 1970. | Missing |
| 4 April 1970 | Whispers | Patrick Foster | Innes Lloyd | Henri Safran | Gwen Watford, David Langton, Tom Oliver, Ysanne Churchman | | Missing |
| 11 April 1970 | Revolution: Cromwell | Cecil P. Taylor | Innes Lloyd | Tristan de Vere Cole | Leslie Sands, Kenneth Colley, Davyd Harries | Repeated 3 May 1971. Taylor authored a book on the production of his play. | Missing |
| 18 April 1970 | Revolution: Lenin | Cecil P. Taylor | Innes Lloyd | Brian Farnham | Lee Montague, Norman Rossington, David Collings | | Missing |
| 25 April 1970 | Revolution: Fidel Castro | Cecil P. Taylor | Innes Lloyd | Michael Hart | Bernard Horsfall, Tom Conti, Bernard Finch, Alec Wallis | | Missing |
| 9 May 1970 | Is That Your Body, Boy? | Andrew Davies | Innes Lloyd | Claude Whatham | Ron Moody, Michael Kitchen, Keith Skinner | Repeated on BBC1 14 August 1970. Released online. | Survives |
| 16 May 1970 | The Tidewatchers | David McGibbon | Innes Lloyd | James Vowden | Sam Kydd, Richard O'Callaghan, Maurice Roëves | Repeated 17 May 1971. | Missing |
| 23 May 1970 | Twenty-Six Efforts at Pornography | Carey Harrison | Innes Lloyd | Robert Knights | Mark Dignam, Keith McNally | Repeated 23 August 1971. | Missing |
| 6 June 1970 | Lily: Part 1 | Jean Benedetti | Innes Lloyd | Gilchrist Calder | Dandy Nichols, Iain Cuthbertson, Avis Bunnage, Freda Dowie, Paul Stassino | Repeated 6 September 1971. | Missing |
| 13 June 1970 | Lily: Part 2 | Jean Benedetti | Innes Lloyd | Hugh David | Avis Bunnage, Iain Cuthbertson, Dandy Nichols, Patrick Wymark, Freda Dowie, Paul Stassino, André van Gyseghem, Glynn Edwards, Graham Leaman, John Scott Martin | Repeated 13 September 1971. | Missing |
| 20 June 1970 | Ben | Roy Minton | Innes Lloyd | Colin Cant | John Gregson, Jeremy Burring | Repeated 10 May 1971. | Missing |
| 27 June 1970 | An Uncertain Sound | Leo Knowles | Innes Lloyd | Tristan de Vere Cole | John Carlisle, Ewan Hooper, Peter Miles, Louise Nelson | | Missing |
| 4 July 1970 | Hope | John Spurling | Innes Lloyd | John Glenister | John Bennett, John Sharp, Annette Crosbie | | Missing |
| 25 July 1970 | Good Times | Roy Minton | Innes Lloyd | Brian Farnham | Gwen Watford, Victor Maddern | | Missing |
| 1 August 1970 | Tropical Wednesdays | James Gibbons | Innes Lloyd | Colin Cant | Joyce Carey, Agnes Lauchlan, Nadim Sawalha | | Missing |
Series Six
| 18 September 1970 | The Raid | Conn Ryan | Innes Lloyd | Anne Head | Michael Goodliffe, Rachel Gurney, Clifton Jones | | Missing |
| 2 October 1970 | The Year of the Crow | Lida Winiewicz, translated by Rudolph Cartier. | Innes Lloyd | Rudolph Cartier | Nigel Davenport, Marius Goring, Colin Jeavons, Athol Coats | | Missing |
| 9 October 1970 | Did Your Nanny Come From Bergen? | Shelagh Delaney | Innes Lloyd | Suzanne Neild | Agnes Lauchlan, John Rees, Michael Trubshawe, Guy Middleton, June Jago, Alethea Charlton, David Allister | | Missing |
| 16 October 1970 | Tribunal | Leo Knowles | Innes Lloyd | Keith Williams | Leslie Sands, John Carlisle, Patrick Connor, Peter Hutchins, Godfrey James | | Missing |
| 30 October 1970 | Helen | Keith Dewhurst, based on Euripides | Innes Lloyd | Herbert Wise | Aspassia Papathanassiou, Paul Daneman, Ian Ogilvy, Noel Johnson, Mark Rivers, Stacey Tendeter | Based on the play. | Missing |
| 13 November 1970 | The Warmonger | Keith Waterhouse | Innes Lloyd | Mischa Scorer | Nicholas Osborn, Paul Jacobs, Alan Baverstock, Nicholas Rymills, Martin Cox | A BBC-Bavaria Atelier Gmbh Munich co-production. Repeated 11 April 1971. | Survives |
| 27 November 1970 | The Editor Regrets | William Douglas Home | Innes Lloyd | Philip Dudley | William Mervyn, Dinsdale Landen, Penelope Wilton | | Missing |
| 4 December 1970 | Waugh on Crime: 1: In Which Inspector Waugh Settles an Account | Arden Winch | Innes Lloyd | Tristan de Vere Cole | Clive Swift, Willoughby Gray | Repeated 27 September 1972. | Survives |
| 11 December 1970 | Waugh on Crime: 2: In Which Inspector Waugh Meets a Man Going to St. Ives | Arden Winch | Innes Lloyd | Tristan de Vere Cole | Clive Swift | | Survives |
| 18 December 1970 | Waugh on Crime: 3: In Which Inspector Waugh Encounters the English Class System | Arden Winch | Innes Lloyd | Philip Dudley | Clive Swift, John Dawson, David McKail | Repeated 4 October 1972. | Survives |
| 25 December 1970 | Waugh on Crime: 4: In Which Inspector Waugh Observes the Truth of an Old Music-Hall Song | Arden Winch | Innes Lloyd | Philip Dudley | Clive Swift, Sydney Tafler, George Tovey | Repeated 11 October 1972. | Survives |
| 1 January 1971 | Waugh on Crime: 5: In Which Inspector Waugh Plays Cops and Robbers | Arden Winch | Innes Lloyd | Tristan de Vere Cole | Clive Swift, Alethea Charlton | Repeated 18 October 1972. | Survives |
| 8 January 1971 | Waugh on Crime: 6: In Which Inspector Waugh Knows the Criminal but not the Crime | Arden Winch | Innes Lloyd | Philip Dudley | Clive Swift, Moray Watson, Brian Peck | Repeated 25 October 1972. | Survives |
| 11 January 1971 | But Now They Are Fled | Ron Berry | Innes Lloyd | Clive Rees | Nicholas Jones, Angharad Rees | Repeated 7 February 1972. | Survives |
| 18 January 1971 | Faith | John Spurling | Anne Head | Michael Hart | Robert Lang, John Franklyn-Robbins, Esmond Knight, Kara Wilson | | Missing |
| 25 January 1971 | Terrible Jim Fitch | James Leo Herlihy | Innes Lloyd | James Firman | Nicol Williamson, Marianne Faithfull | | Missing |
| 1 February 1971 | The Bequest | Carey Harrison | Innes Lloyd | Christopher Morahan | Geoffrey Sumner, Keith Barron | | Missing |
| 8 February 1971 | Me Mackenna | Don Shaw | Innes Lloyd | Gilchrist Calder | Anthony Heaton, Peter Attard, David Dixon, Prentis Hancock, Richard O'Sullivan, Nicholas Field, Keith Simon | Repeated 15 May 1972. | Missing |
| 15 February 1971 | The Proposal | Anton Chekhov, translated by Elizaveta Fen. | Innes Lloyd | Rudolph Cartier | Elisabeth Bergner, Hugh Griffith, Rupert Davies | Adapted from the play. | Missing |
| 22 February 1971 | Asquith in Orbit | Hugo Charteris | Innes Lloyd | Rodney Bennett | Charles Gray, Peter Barkworth, David Bauer, Robert Lee | Repeated 14 February 1972. | Missing |
| 1 March 1971 | Happy Days Are Here Again | Dennis Woolf | Anne Head | Brian Farnham | Joe Melia, Hilda Braid, Neil Wilson, Alex Macintosh, Sheila Grant | Repeated 24 April 1972. | Missing |
| 8 March 1971 | The Railwayman's New Clothes | Willis Hall | Anne Head | Gilchrist Calder | Peter Sallis, Barbara Mitchell, Jack Smethurst, David Gwillim | Repeated 1 May 1972. | Missing |
| 15 March 1971 | No Charge for the Extra Service | Rhys Adrian | Anne Head | Suzanne Neild | Lally Bowers, John Nettleton | | Missing |
| 22 March 1971 | A Distinct Chill | Ian Curteis | Anne Head | Michael Hart | Ann Bell, Derek Smith, Julian Curry, Margery Withers | | Missing |
| 29 March 1971 | The Waiting-Room | John Bowen | Innes Lloyd | Robert Knights | Barbara Leigh-Hunt, David Cook | Repeated 31 July 1972. | Missing |
| 5 April 1971 | Listen to the Drums | David McGibbon | Anne Head | Vere Lorrimer | Jean Moran, Seán Barrett, Gertrude Russell, Barry Keegan, Kerry Marsh, Harry Towb | | Missing |
| 24 May 1971 | Death's Head | Campbell Black | Anne Head | John Mathews | Peter Dyneley, Jerome Willis, Martin Jarvis, Allan Surtees | | Missing |
| 31 May 1971 | Jilly | Jumbo Parker | Innes Lloyd | Ben Rea | Patrick Troughton, Patsy Rowlands, David Collings | | Missing |
| 7 June 1971 | Something for the Children | Alan Wells | Anne Head | John Hefin | Flora Robson, Alfred Lynch, Petra Markham | Repeated 17 April 1972. | Missing |
| 14 June 1971 | The Room They Left | Richard McNeff | Anne Head | Keith Williams | Carole Mowlam, James Laurenson, Donald Gee, Alan Downer, Leslie Dwyer | | Missing |
| 5 July 1971 | Seven Days in the Life of Andrew Pelham: Day 1: Crisis | Derek Hoddinott | Innes Lloyd | Gilchrist Calder | Donald Sinden, David Quilter, Wendy Williams | | Missing |
| 12 July 1971 | Seven Days in the Life of Andrew Pelham: Day 2: Suspect | Derek Hoddinott | Innes Lloyd | Gilchrist Calder | Donald Sinden, Moray Watson | | Missing |
| 19 July 1971 | Seven Days in the Life of Andrew Pelham: Day 3: Inquiry | Don Shaw | Innes Lloyd | Gilchrist Calder | Donald Sinden, John Carson, Moray Watson, Willoughby Gray, William Fox, Robert James | | Missing |
| 26 July 1971 | Seven Days in the Life of Andrew Pelham: Day 4: Retreat | Don Shaw | Innes Lloyd | Gilchrist Calder | Donald Sinden, Cyril Luckham | | Missing |
| 2 August 1971 | Seven Days in the Life of Andrew Pelham: Day 5: Deadlock | Don Shaw | Innes Lloyd | Gilchrist Calder | Donald Sinden, David Langton | | Missing |
| 9 August 1971 | Seven Days in the Life of Andrew Pelham: Day 6: Breakthrough | Don Shaw | Innes Lloyd | Gilchrist Calder | Donald Sinden, David Langton, Wendy Williams | | 16mm b&w film print |
| 16 August 1971 | Seven Days in the Life of Andrew Pelham: Day 7: Decision | Don Shaw | Innes Lloyd | Gilchrist Calder | Donald Sinden, John Standing, Frederick Jaeger | | Missing |
Series Seven
| 20 September 1971 | Walt, King of the Dumper | Jim Allen | Tim Aspinall | Jack Gold | Dennis Waterman, Prentis Hancock, Paddy Joyce, Tony Caunter, Wanda Ventham | Repeated 10 July 1972. | Survives |
| 27 September 1971 | Soldier Ants | John Gale | Anne Head | Donald McWhinnie | Earl Cameron, Neil Wilson, Paul Aston, Frederick Treves, Eric Thompson, James Mellor, Patrick Tull | Repeated 24 July 1972. | Missing |
| 4 October 1971 | Gun Play | Philip Martin | Anne Head | Rodney Bennett | John Collin, Anna Cropper, Derek Newark | Repeated 8 May 1972. | Missing |
| 11 October 1971 | Combing Down His Yellow Hair | Raymond Hitchcock | Anne Head | Ken Hannam | Brian Cox, Mark McManus | | Missing |
| 18 October 1971 | The Moonlighters | Tom Clarke | Anne Head | Brian Farnham | Windsor Davies, Sam Kydd, Don Hawkins, Sharon Duce, Ronnie Masterson | | Missing |
| 25 October 1971 | Getting In | Mavor Moore | Anne Head | John Hefin | Joss Ackland, Robert Hardy | Repeated 17 July 1972. | Survives |
| 1 November 1971 | Psychological Warfare | Cyril Bolton | Tim Aspinall | Mike Newell | Del Henney, Bill Maynard, Victor Henry, Steven Berkoff | | Missing |
| 8 November 1971 | A Settled Sort Of Life | Tom Clarke | Tim Aspinall | Michael Hayes | Sara Kestelman, Norman Rodway, Derek Royle | | Missing |
| 15 November 1971 | The Gardeners Of My Youth | Rhys Adrian | Tim Aspinall | Donald McWhinnie | Hugh Burden, John Nettleton, Trader Faulkner, Clyde Pollitt | | Missing |
| 22 November 1971 | Blues in the Morning | David McGibbon | Anne Head | John Powell | Prunella Scales, Barry Evans, Brian Rawlinson, Harold Kasket | | Missing |
| 29 November 1971 | Jenkins | David Snodin | Anne Head | Eric Hills | Charles Gray, Lyndon Brook, Jeremy Young, Derek Benfield, Susan Penhaligon | | Missing |
| 6 December 1971 | Allotment | Sean Hignett | Pharic MacLaren | Tina Wakerell | Frank Windsor, Derek Anders, Joan Young | BBC Scotland. | Survives |
| 13 December 1971 | Farewell Performance | Rodney Bennett | Anne Head | Rodney Bennett | Sydney Tafler | | Missing |
| 20 December 1971 | Footprints | Robin Smyth | Anne Head | Basil Coleman | Daphne Slater, Terence Longdon, Daphne Heard | | Missing |
| 21 December 1971 | A Wen | Saul Bellow | Anne Head | Piers Haggard | Sam Wanamaker, Miriam Karlin | Theatrical | Missing |
| 3 January 1972 | Not Counting the Savages | B. S. Johnson | Tim Aspinall | Mike Newell | Hugh Burden, Brenda Bruce, Fiona Walker, William Hoyland | | Domestic video recording |
| 10 January 1972 | Uncle Rollo | Ron Berry | Innes Lloyd | Hugh David | Hugh Griffith, Clive Merrison | | Missing |
| 17 January 1972 | They Don't All Open Men's Boutiques | Willis Hall | Anne Head | Herbert Wise | Derek Newark, David Hill, John Lyons, Don Hawkins, Rayner Bourton, William Victor, Johnnie Wade, John Dearth, Alan Chuntz | Repeated 3 December 1973 and under Scene on BBC1 21 March 1974. | Missing |
| 24 January 1972 | The Penthouse Apartment | William Trevor | Anne Head | Gilchrist Calder | Colin Blakely, Rachel Kempson, Alethea Charlton, John Harvey, Stacey Tendeter | | Missing |
| 31 January 1972 | An Affair Of Honour | Reg Hill | Tim Aspinall | Mark Cullingham | Nigel Davenport, Michael Pennington, Penelope Wilton, Frederick Pyne | | Missing |
| 21 February 1972 | An Arrow For Little Audrey | Brian Finch | David Rose | Paul Ciappessoni | Eric Allan, Geoffrey Hughes | 1st BBC Birmingham Season, #1. Repeated 22 March 1973. | Survives |
| 28 February 1972 | That Quiet Earth | John Hopkins | David Rose | John Hopkins | Shirley Knight Hopkins, David Savile, David Bradley, Ewan Hooper, Anne Cunningham | 1st BBC Birmingham Season, #2. | Survives |
| 6 March 1972 | Said the Preacher | Arthur Hopcraft | David Rose | Michael Apted | Victor Henry, Madge Hindle, Frank Crompton, Mark Dignam, Bernard Wrigley | 1st BBC Birmingham Season, #3. Repeated 5 April 1973. | Survives |
| 13 March 1972 | That Time Of Life | David Cregan | David Rose | Michael Simpson | John Neville, Peter Bayliss, Nell Brennan, Barbara Ogilvie | 1st BBC Birmingham Season, #4. | Missing |
| 20 March 1972 | Under the Age | Ted Whitehead | David Rose | Alan Clarke | Paul Angelis, Michael Angelis, Stephen Bent | 1st BBC Birmingham Season, #5. Repeated 16 August 1973. Released on Blu-Ray. | Survives |
| 27 March 1972 | Bypass | David Rudkin | David Rose | David Rose | Jean Leppard, Adrian Bracken, Bob Peck, Simon Carter | 1st BBC Birmingham Season, #6. Repeated 29 March 1973. | Missing |
| 3 April 1972 | And For My Next Trick | Jack Rosenthal | David Rose | Brian Parker | Noel Dyson, Tenniel Evans, Margaret Flint, Terence Soall, Virginia Hewitt, Sheila Reid, Frances White | 1st BBC Birmingham Season, #7. | Missing |
| 10 April 1972 | The Sit In | Keith Dewhurst | David Rose | Paul Ciappessoni | Carolyn Courage, Martin Shaw, Leonard Maguire, Barry Foster, Jennifer Wilson | 1st BBC Birmingham Season, #8. | Missing |
| 22 May 1972 | Mill Hill | John Mortimer | Anne Head | Michael Hayes | Geraldine McEwan, Peter Cook, Clive Revill, Alison Griffin | Theatrical. Repeated 7 June 1973. | Survives |
| 29 May 1972 | Kings Cross Lunch Hour | John Mortimer | Tim Aspinall | Gilchrist Calder | Pauline Collins, Joss Ackland, Lila Kaye | Theatrical | Survives |
| 5 June 1972 | Swiss Cottage | John Mortimer | Tim Aspinall | Rodney Bennett | Derek Godfrey, Priscilla Morgan, Jan Francis, Bernice Spivack | Theatrical | Missing |
| 12 June 1972 | Knightsbridge | John Mortimer | Tim Aspinall | Mark Cullingham | Googie Withers, Donald Churchill, Angela Scoular | Theatrical. Repeated 31 May 1973. | Survives |
| 19 June 1972 | Bermondsey | John Mortimer | Anne Head | Claude Whatham | Edward Fox, Dinsdale Landen, Rosemary Leach, Sharon Duce | Theatrical. Repeated 14 June 1973. | Survives |
Series Eight
| 14 August 1972 | Hands | Fay Weldon | Tim Aspinall | Philip Saville | Rosemary Leach | Repeated 3 June 1974. | Missing |
| 21 August 1972 | Lushly | Howard Brenton | Anne Head | Brian Farnham | Roy Kinnear, Dudley Sutton, George Tovey | | Missing |
| 28 August 1972 | Too Far | Joan Morahan | Tim Aspinall | Christopher Morahan | Barrie Ingham, Sheila Allen, Ann Lynn | | Missing |
| 4 September 1972 | Thrills Galore | Rhys Adrian | Tim Aspinall | Donald McWhinnie | Rosalind Ayres, Dennis Chinnery, Kate Coleridge, John Dearth, Jimmy Gardner, Harry Landis, Patrick Magee, James Mellor, Declan Mulholland, Clyde Pollitt, Bryan Pringle | Repeated 17 December 1973 and 8 April 1974. | Survives |
| 11 September 1972 | The Argument | Mavor Moore | Tim Aspinall | Brian Farnham | Judy Parfitt, Lee Montague | | Missing |
| 18 September 1972 | The Seventh Juror | Rayner Heppenstall | Anne Head | Alan Cooke | Walter Brown, John Arnatt, Peter Sinclair, Shelagh Fraser, Colin Douglas | | Missing |
| 25 September 1972 | I Spy a Stranger | Jean Rhys, dramatised by Patrick Garland | Anne Head | Mark Cullingham | Mona Washbourne, Noel Dyson, Hana Maria Pravda, Basil Dignam | Literary. Repeated 27 May 1974. | Survives |
| 2 October 1972 | The Judge's Wife | Caryl Churchill | Anne Head | James Ferman | Sebastian Shaw, Rachel Kempson, Valerie White, Evin Crowley | | Missing |
| 12 October 1972 | Scarborough | Donald Howarth | David Rose | Peter Cregeen | David Sadgrove, Louisa Martin, Brian Deacon | 2nd BBC Birmingham Season, #1. | Survives |
| 19 October 1972 | Tonight We Meet Arthur Pendelbury | Alan Plater | David Rose | Christopher Morahan | Donald Churchill, Norman Bird | 2nd BBC Birmingham Season, #2. | Missing |
| 26 October 1972 | Ronnie's So Long at the Fair | Jay Humber | David Rose | Ian Wyatt | David Dixon, Sherrie Hewson, Pat Heywood, John Collin | 2nd BBC Birmingham Season, #3. | Missing |
| 2 November 1972 | Ten Torrey Canyons | Brian Clark | David Rose | Eric Hills | Peter Halliday, Paul Henry, Jack Holloway, Ken Jones | 2nd BBC Birmingham Season, #4. | Missing |
| 9 November 1972 | I Wouldn't Tell On You, Miss | Susan Pleat | David Rose | Paul Ciappessoni | Leslie Sands, Brenda Bruce, Christine Rees, Adrienne Byrne, Verna Harvey | 2nd BBC Birmingham Season, #5. | Missing |
| 16 November 1972 | You're Free | Henry Livings | David Rose | Anthony Page | Rachel Roberts, Colin Blakely | 2nd BBC Birmingham Season, #6. | Survives |
| 22 November 1972 | Dialogue | Alasdair Gray | Pharic MacLaren | Bob Hird | David Swift, Elizabeth Bell | BBC Scotland. | Missing |
| 29 November 1972 | Krapp's Last Tape | Samuel Beckett | Tim Aspinall | Donald McWhinnie | Patrick Magee | Adapted from the play. Repeated 17 December 1982 and 31 January 1990. | Survives |
| 6 December 1972 | The Chauffeur and the Lady | Howard Barker | Tim Aspinall | Mike Newell | Mary Wimbush, Kenneth Cranham, Catherine Kessler | | Missing |
| 13 December 1972 | You've Been a Long Time, Alfred | John Loveday | Anne Head | Voytek | Mona Bruce, David Troughton, Karl Howman | Repeated 15 April 1974. | Missing |
| 3 January 1973 | The Japanese Student | Frank Tuohy | Tim Aspinall | James Ferman | Gwen Cherrell, Stephen Murray, Tessa Wyatt, Eric Young | | Missing |
| 10 January 1973 | The Punchy and the Fairy | Jim Allen | Anne Head | Roy Battersby | James Culliford, Peter Kerrigan | | Missing |
| 17 January 1973 | Playthings | John Harris | Tim Aspinall | Simon Langton | Brian Glover, Stephen Bone | | Missing |
| 24 January 1973 | Is Nellie Dead? | Tom Woodall | Anne Head | Herbert Wise | Beatrix Lehmann, Philip Latham, Robert Powell | | Missing |
| 31 January 1973 | A Chance Encounter | Rhys Adrian | Anne Head | Tim Aspinall | Alfred Marks, Hugh Burden, Oliver MacGreevy, Esmond Webb | | Missing |
Continuation of Thirty-Minute Theatre, albeit not billed as such in the Radio Times
| 8 February 1973 | A Touch of Eastern Promise | Tara Prem | David Rose | Michael Lindsay-Hogg | Dev Sagoo, Jamila Massey, Albert Moses | 3rd BBC Birmingham Season, #1. Repeated 1 April 1974. | Survives |
| 15 February 1973 | And All Who Sail in Her | Andy Ashton | David Rose | Kenneth Ives | Neil McCarthy, Bob Hoskins | 3rd BBC Birmingham Season, #2. | Missing |
| 22 February 1973 | You and Me and Him | David Mercer | David Rose | Barry Hanson | Peter Vaughan | 3rd BBC Birmingham Season, #3. | Survives |
| 1 March 1973 | The Great Acrobile | Roy Minton | David Rose | Tristan de Vere Cole | Bernard Spear, Brian Godfrey, John Garrie, Ralph Arliss | 3rd BBC Birmingham Season, #4. | Missing |
| 8 March 1973 | I Want to Marry Your Son | David Cregan | David Rose | Kenneth Ives | Richard Johnson, Estelle Kohler, Carmen Munroe, Gerald James | 3rd BBC Birmingham Season, #5. | Survives |
| 15 March 1973 | Atrocity | David Rudkin | David Rose | Barry Hanson | Anthony Douse, Alex Marshall, Doreen Hepburn, Malcolm Terris | 3rd BBC Birmingham Season, #6. | Missing (extract survives) |
| 12 April 1973 | Swamp Music | Snoo Wilson | Anne Head | Ian MacNaughton | Ed Devereaux, Bruce Bould | | Missing |
| 19 April 1973 | Croust | Dave Humphries | Anne Head | John Hefin | Bryan Pringle, Michael Brennan, Charles Lamb, Jimmy Gardner | | Missing |
| 26 April 1973 | The Baby's Name Being Kitchener | Peter Everett | Tim Aspinall | Michael Hayes | Leonard Rossiter, Margaret Courtenay | | Missing |
| 3 May 1973 | Kamikaze in the Coffee Bath | John Gale | Tim Aspinall | Bill Craske | Michael Bates, Timothy Bateson, Oliver MacGreevy | | Missing |
| 10 May 1973 | About a Bout | Philip Martin | Anne Head | Rodney Bennett | Peter Schofield, Hilary Mason, Ray Mort | | Missing |
| 17 May 1973 | Shakespeare Country | Alfred Fagon | Tim Aspinall | Philip Saville | Alfred Fagon, Carmen Munroe, Stefan Kalipha, Merdel Jordine | | Missing |
| 19 July 1973 | Places Where They Sing | Jonathan Hales | Richard Broke | Bill Hays | Gordon Jackson, Phil Daniels, Patrick Murray, Simon Gipps-Kent, Richard Willis | Repeated under Centre Play 22 May 1975. | Missing |
| 26 July 1973 | The Girls in Their Summer Dresses | Irwin Shaw | Anne Head | Clive Rees | Ann Bell, Anton Rodgers | Repeated 27 October 1974. | Survives |
| 2 August 1973 | The Museum Attendant | Michael Abbensetts | Ann Scott | Derek Bennett | Joseph Greig, David Battley, Robin Parkinson, Tony Selby | Repeated under Centre Play 5 June 1975. | Survives |
| 9 August 1973 | The Joke | Maggie Wadey | Ann Scott | Tim Aspinall | Yvonne Antrobus, Aubrey Woods, Bernard Lee, Louis Selwyn | | Missing |

== See also ==
Other BBC2 drama anthology series include

- Theatre 625
- Second City Firsts
- BBC2 Playhouse
- Screen Two
- Stage 2
- Thursday Theatre
