= Madge Ryan =

Australian actress (1919–1994)

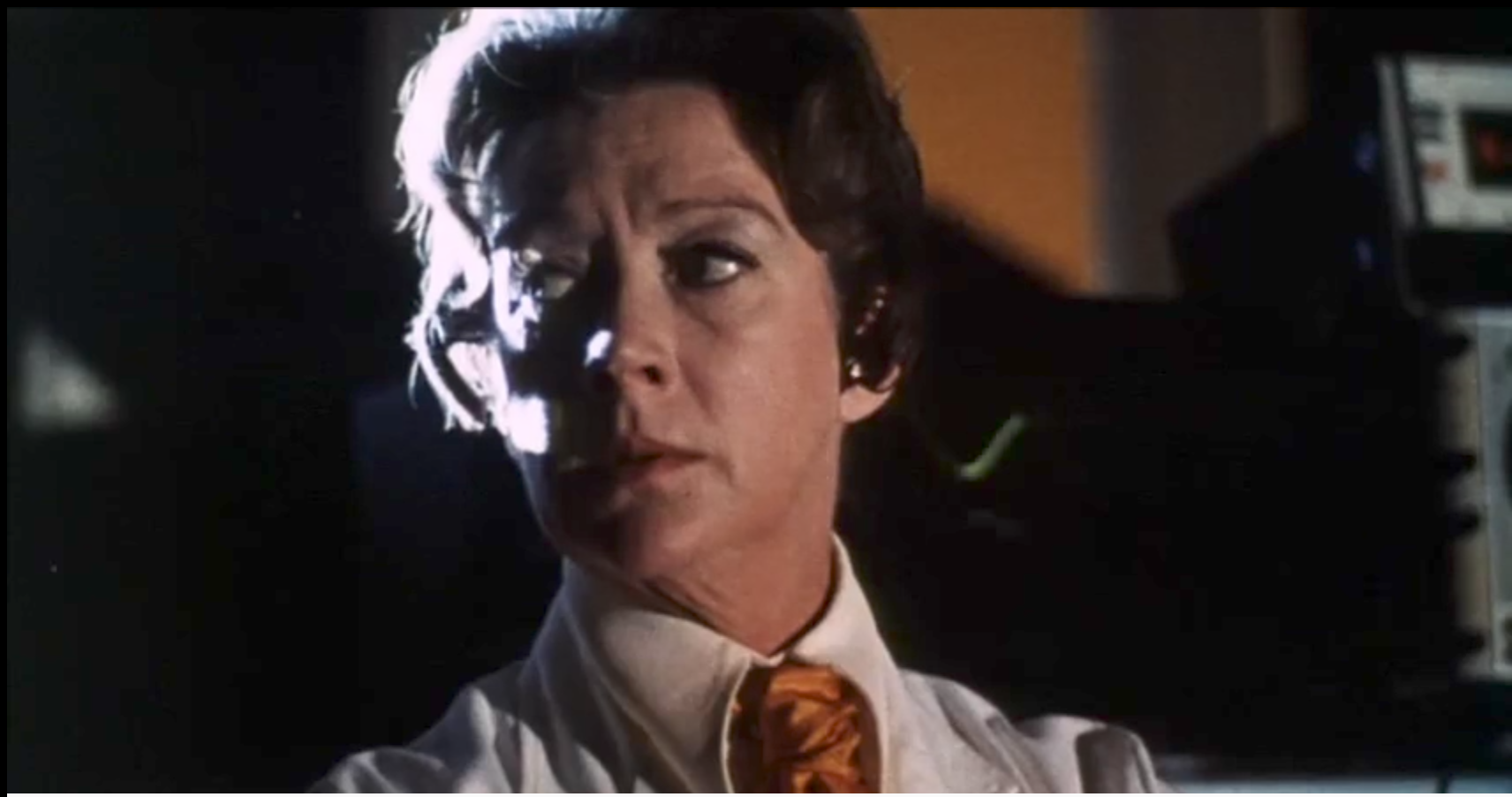
- in A Clockwork Orange (1971)
- Born: Madge Winifred Ryan; 8 January 1919; Townsville, Queensland, Australia
- Died: 9 January 1994 (aged 75); London, England
- Occupations: Screen and stage actress
- Children: Lyn Ashley
- Relatives: Eric Idle (former-son-in-law)

Madge Winifred Ryan (8 January 1919 – 9 January 1994) was an Australian actress, known for her stage and film roles in the United Kingdom.

== Early life ==
Ryan was born on 8 January 1919 in Townsville, Queensland, Australia, the youngest child of Michael Edward Ryan, a commercial traveller, and Sarah Josephine Ryan (née Brady) Her father sang in the church choir, while her mother played the organ, becoming an accompanist for silent movies. Ryan attended school at St Patrick's College and participated in plays, recitals, and elocution competitions. After leaving school she worked for an insurance company.

== Career ==
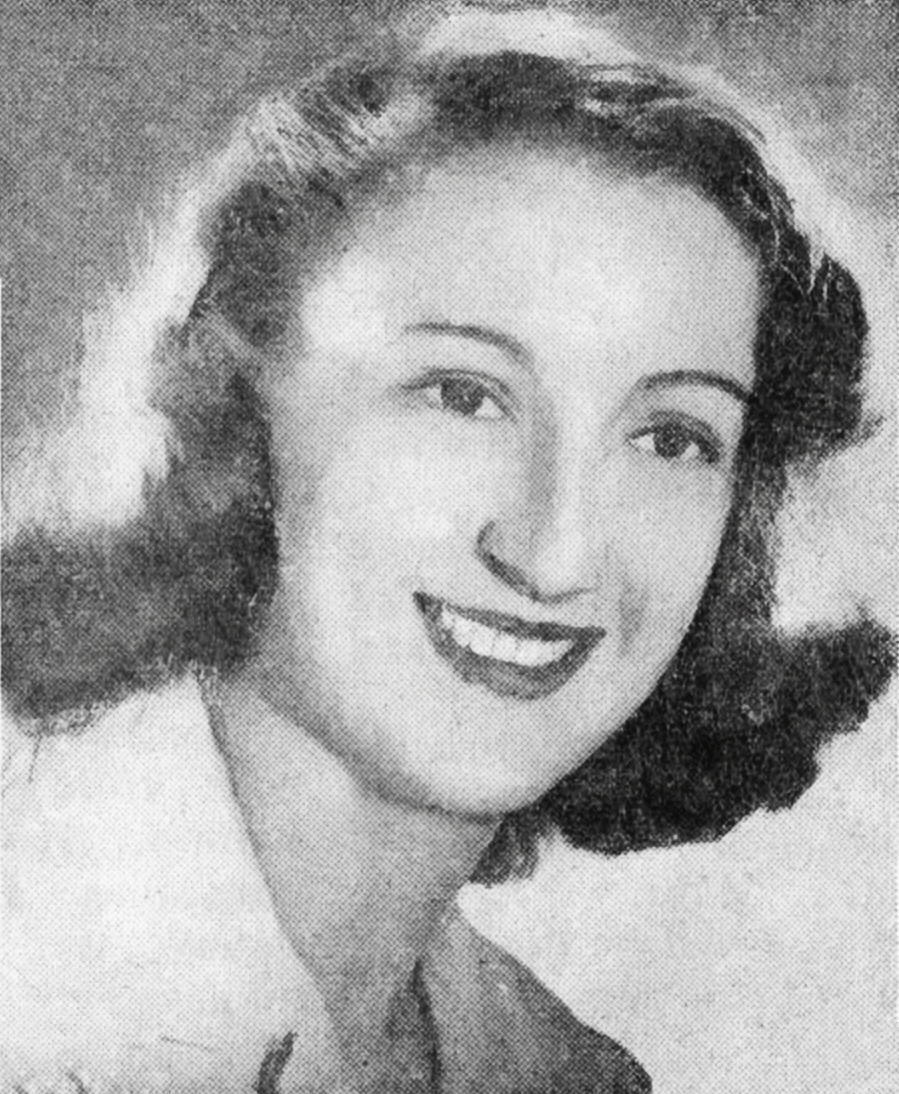
Madge Ryan in 1948, photographed for The Bulletin by Noel Rubie

Ryan began working in radio in Townsville during her teens, with an early role as the mother in One Man's Family. After getting married, and starting a family, her career initially took a back seat. However, after the family moved to Sydney, Ryan established herself as a theatre actor, joining the Independent Theatre Company to perform in stage productions of The Seagull, The Barretts of Wimpole Street, and Children in Uniform. She then toured Australia with John Nugent-Hayward in The Patsy, Fresh Fields and Claudia for four months.

Back in Sydney, Ryan undertook further radio work. Her first role for the ABC was as Aunt Florence in a serial called Space Explorers. This led to frequent roles on ABC Radio, Lux Radio Theatre and Macquarie Radio Theatre. She also performed in long-running serial Blue Hills. She then returned to the stage, playing Birdie Hubbard in Doris Fitton's 1948 production of The Little Foxes at the Independent and Melbourne's Princess Theatre.

In 1954, Ryan appeared as Pearl Cunningham in an Australian Elizabethan Theatre Trust production of Ray Lawler's Summer of the Seventeenth Doll. She emigrated to the United Kingdom in 1957 and starred in numerous British stage shows, including a UK tour of Summer of the Seventeenth Doll. In 1958, she then appeared on Broadway in the role.

In London, Ryan established a reputation as an actress who tackled challenging roles, including misfit and villains. In 1964, she played Kath in the original London production of Joe Orton's Entertaining Mr Sloane. The Independent wrote, "as the dreadful Kath, ageing seductress and murderous landlady... Madge Ryan's cruel, cool but undeniably comic acting provoked one critic to describe her work... as 'something very close to perfection'."

In 1965, Ryan played the lead role in Mother Courage at the Old Vic, touring internationally. An international tour as Gertrude in Hamlet followed, and she also played the Nurse in Romeo and Juliet, both for the Bristol Old Vic. Further stage roles included Maisie Madigan in Juno and the Paycock, Lizzie Sweeney in a 1967 London production of Philadelphia, Here I Come and Mrs Weston in Say Goodnight to Grandma.

In 1968, Ryan returned to Australia to perform in a double bill of Black Comedy and The White Liars.

Ryan played Dr. Branom in 1971 Stanley Kubrick classic feature film A Clockwork Orange, opposite Malcolm McDowell. Other film appearances included Summer Holiday (1963), Frenzy (1972), and Who Is Killing the Great Chefs of Europe? (1978).

Ryan also appeared in television plays and serials including a 1966 BBC play of the month, Defection, playing Evdokia Petrov. The same year, she appeared in a season 5 episode ("The Better Mousetrap") of television series The Saint as Bertha Noversham, a French Riviera jewel thief.

In the 1970s and 1980s, Ryan performed in repertory theatre, including playing Madam Arkadina in The Seagull (in Exeter), Mrs Warren in Mrs. Warren's Profession and Lady Bracknell in The Importance of Being Earnest (in Birmingham). She also appeared in Ring Round the Moon in Chichester. In 1975, Ryan played Rachel Lynde in a six-part television miniseries version of Anne of Avonlea.

In 1993, the year before her death, Ryan appeared in a West End stage production of Medea, opposite Diana Rigg.

== Personal life ==
Ryan married Milton Lynn Rumble, a bank officer, on 31 January 1939 at Townsville's Sacred Heart Cathedral, although used her maiden name professionally. The couple relocated to Toowoomba in 1940, and then to Sydney. Her marriage ended in 1957.

During the second World War, Ryan drove ambulances for the National Emergency Services.

During her early career, Ryan lived in Epping, then a rural setting on Sydney's outer fringe.

Ryan had two daughters, one of whom, Lyn Ashley born on 18 March 1940, was also an actress. Between 1969 and 1975, Eric Idle was married to Ryan's daughter, Lyn.

== Death ==
Ryan died in Westminster, London on 9 January 1994, one day after her 75th birthday. A memorial service was held at St James's Church, in Piccadilly. In their obituary for Ryan, The Independent wrote, "what set her apart from the others was a certain, often powerful, independence of spirit and humour... It was a fulfilled career."

== Filmography ==
=== Film ===
Year	Title	Role	Notes	Ref.
1959	Witness in the Dark	Mrs. Finch	Film	
1960	Upstairs and Downstairs	Sergeant Tuck	Film	
1960	Hand in Hand	George's Wife	Film	
1962	Tiara Tahiti	Millie Brooks	Film	
1962	The Shifting Heart		Film	
1963	Summer Holiday	Stella Winters	Film	
1963	Doctor in Distress	Mrs. Clapper	Film	
1964	This Is My Street	Kitty	Film	
1968	The Strange Affair	Aunt Mary	Film	
1970	I Start Counting	Mother	Film	
1971	A Clockwork Orange	Dr. Branom	Film	
1972	Frenzy	Mrs. Davison	Film	
1972	Endless Night (aka Agatha Christie's Endless Night)	Michael's mother	Film	
1973	Yellow Dog	Della's Mother	Film	
1978	Who Is Killing the Great Chefs of Europe? (aka Too Many Chefs and Someone Is Killing the Great Chefs of Europe)	Beecham	Film	
1979	The Lady Vanishes	Rose Flood Porter	Film	
1988	Kokoda Crescent	Margaret	Film	
1993	Splitting Heirs	Woman with Dog	Film	

=== Television ===
Year	Title	Role	Notes	Ref.
1957	Summer of the Seventeenth Doll	Pearl Cunningham	TV play, episode of Theatre Night	
1958–1970	Armchair Theatre	Mrs Weston	TV play, 9 episodes including Say Goodnight to Your Grandma	
1959	BBC Sunday Night Theatre	Margaret Lord / Hilda Binns / Mrs Atkinson	3 episodes	
1959	The Flying Doctor	Mrs Evans	1 episode	
1959–1962	ITV Play of the Week	Various roles	4 episodes	
1960	A Night Out	Mrs Stokes	TV play, episode of Armchair Theatre	
1960	A Holiday Abroad	Sylvia Bates	TV play, episode of ITV Television Playhouse	
1960	Probation Officer	Ella Rhodes	1 episode	
1960	Flag Fall	Maud – Taxi Dispatcher	TV play, episode of Armchair Mystery Theatre	
1962	Maigret	Madame Machére	1 episode	
1962	Reunion Day	Grace	TV play	
1962	The Slaughter of St. Teresa's Day	Oola Maguire	TV play	
1962	The One Day of the Year	Dot Cook	TV play	
1963	Anna Christie	Marthy Owen	TV play	
1963; 1964	First Night	Various roles	3 episodes	
1964	The Avengers	Mrs Eve Turner	1 episode	
1964	Love Story	Marion	1 episode	
1964	Emergency Ward 10	May Gorton	2 episodes	
1964	Summer of the Seventeenth Doll	Pearl Cunningham	TV play, episode of Thursday Theatre	
1965; 1970	Thirty-Minute Theatre	Mrs Purgold / Janet Harford	TV plays, 2 episodes	
1965; 1971	Public Eye	Mrs Sutton-Piper / Rose Mason	2 episodes	
1966	Defection! The Case of Colonel Petrov	Dusya	TV play, episode of BBC Play of the Month	
1966	The Saint	Mrs Bertha Noversham	1 episode	
1968	Sherlock Holmes	Lady Morcar	Episode: "The Blue Carbuncle"	
1968	The Shifting Heart	Momma	TV play	
1969	Parkin's Patch	Mrs Kenny	1 episode	
1969	Dixon of Dock Green	Nancy Proctor	1 episode	
1969; 1971	Paul Temple	Genine Dalton / Linda Burgess	2 episodes	
1970	Randall and Hopkirk (Deceased)	Mrs Roden	1 episode	
1970	Manhunt	Celestine Moussac	1 episode	
1970	The Best Things in Life	Miss Rossiter	1 episode	
1971	Budgie	Connie	1 episode	
1971	Now Look Here	Mother	7 episodes	
1971	Zinotchka	Madame Sorin	TV short play, episode of Full House	
1971–1977	Play for Today	Elizabeth/ Mother	TV plays, 2 episodes	
1972	The Man and the Snake	Mrs Druring	TV short	
1969; 1973	ITV Saturday Night Theatre	Jean's Mother / Simone / Mrs Pearce	3 episodes	
1974	The Protectors	Mrs Apsimon	1 episode	
1974	Cakes and Ale	Mrs Barton Trafford	2 episodes	
1975	Crown Court	Bridget Behan	3 episodes	
1975	Anne of Avonlea	Rachel Lynde	Miniseries, 6 episodes	
1975	Going, Going, Gone... Free?	Mrs Dean	Episode of Comedy Playhouse	
1975	Moll Flanders	Mrs Oliver	TV movie	
1976	Katy	Bridget	3 episodes	
1976	Beasts	Florence Raymount	1 episode	
1976	Angels	Mrs Dutton	1 episode	
1977	Beryl's Lot	Miss Quillet	2 episodes	
1977	London Belongs to Me	Mrs Vizzard	7 episodes	
1978	All Creatures Great and Small	Miss Harbottle	2 episodes	
1978	A Horseman Riding By	Arabella Codsall	4 episodes	
1978	Shadows	Nanny	1 episode	
1979	S.O.S. Titanic	Violet Jessop	TV movie	
1982	Cymbeline	Mother	TV movie	
1983	Bergerac	Mrs Van Stratton	1 episode	
1983	Nanny	Lydia Crawford	4 episodes	
1983	Events in a Museum	Narrator	TV movie	
1983	Heartattack Hotel	Mrs Todd	TV movie	
1988	Hills End	Miss Elaine Godwin	TV movie	
1990	Families	Ruby Davidson		
1992	Screenplay	Beattie	1 episode	
1992	Casualty	Doreen Phillips	1 episode	
1993	Comedy Playhouse	Gloria	1 episode	
1993	The Inspector Alleyn Mysteries	Lucy Lorrimer	1 episode	

== Theatre ==
Year	Title	Role	Notes	Ref.
	The Seagull		Independent Theatre, Sydney	
1939	The Barretts of Wimpole Street		Independent Theatre, Sydney	
	Children in Uniform		Independent Theatre, Sydney	
	The Patsy		Australian tour	
	Fresh Fields		Australian tour	
	Claudia		Australian tour	
1945	The Desert Song		Theatre Royal Sydney	
1946-1948	The Little Foxes	Birdie Hubbard	Independent Theatre, Sydney, Princess Theatre, Melbourne	
1948	Anna Lucasta		Independent Theatre, Sydney	
1951	Toad of Toad Hall		Independent Theatre, Sydney	
1952	The Cocktail Party	Lavinia	Independent Theatre, Sydney	
1952	Captain Carvallo	Smilja	Independent Theatre, Sydney	
1953	Le Bourgeois Gentilhomme		Independent Theatre, Sydney	
1955	Hamlet	Gertrude	Phillip St Theatre, Sydney	
1955–1956	Happy Returns		Phillip St Theatre, Sydney	
1956	The Rivals	Mrs Malaprop	Australian tour with J. C. Williamson's	
1956–1957	Summer of the Seventeenth Doll	Pearl Cunningham	Australian tour with AETT	
1957	Summer of the Seventeenth Doll	Pearl Cunningham	UK tour with AETT	
1958	Summer of the Seventeenth Doll	Pearl Cunningham	Coronet Theatre, Fireside Theatre, New York with AETT	
1958	The Shifting Heart	Leila Pratt	Theatre Royal, Hobart, National Theatre, Launceston, Comedy Theatre, Melbourne with AETT	
1959	The Shifting Heart	Leila Pratt	Golders Green Hippodrome, London, Duke of York's Theatre, London with AETT & St. James Players	
1960	The Pleasure Garden	Dolly	Pembroke Theatre, Croydon	
1961	The Dark at the Top of the Stairs	Lottie Lacey	Pembroke Theatre, Croydon	
1961	Time and Yellow Roses	The Nurse	His Majesty's Theatre, Aberdeen, St. Martin's Theatre, London	
1962	The Glad and the Sorry Season	Sarah	UK tour	
1964	Entertaining Mr Sloane	Kath	UK tour	
1965	Mother Courage	Mother Courage	Old Vic Theatre, London with National Theatre Co	
1965–1966	Love for Love	Mrs. Foresight	Old Vic Theatre, London & Germany/Russia tour with National Theatre Co	
1966	Juno and the Paycock	Mrs. Maisie Madigan	Old Vic Theatre, London, Alexandra Theatre, Birmingham with National Theatre Co	
1966–1967	Romeo and Juliet	The Nurse	UK/US tour with Bristol Old Vic Company	
1966–1967	Hamlet	Gertrude	UK/US tour with Bristol Old Vic Company	
1967	Measure for Measure	Mistress Overdone	UK/US tour with Bristol Old Vic Company	m
1967	Philadelphia, Here I Come!	Lizzy Sweeney	UK tour	
1968	The White Liars	Sophie / Baroness Lemberg	Comedy Theatre, Melbourne, Theatre Royal Sydney with J. C. Williamson's	
1968	Black Comedy	Miss Furnival	Comedy Theatre, Melbourne, Theatre Royal Sydney with J. C. Williamson's	
1970	Colombe	Madame Alexandra	Citizens' Theatre, Glasgow	
1971	A Hearts and Minds Job	Marjorie	Hampstead, London	
1972	Traveller Without Luggage	Madame Renaud	Thorndike Theatre, Leatherhead	
1972	Epitaph for George Dillon	Mrs. Elliot	Young Vic Theatre, London with National Theatre Company	
1973; 1974	Say Goodnight to Grandma	Mrs. Weston	UK tour with Ray Cooney Productions	
1974	The Seagull	Madame Arkadina	Northcott Theatre, Exeter	
1975	Mrs. Warren's Profession	Mrs. Warren	Birmingham Repertory Theatre	
1975	The Importance of Being Earnest	Lady Bracknell	Birmingham Repertory Theatre	
1976	The White Devil	Cornelia	Old Vic Theatre, London with Bullfinch Productions	
1979	The Shadow Box	Felicity	Cambridge Theatre Company	
1979–1980	Oklahoma!	Aunt Eller	Haymarket Theatre, Leicester, Palace Theatre, London	
1979–1980	The Pirates of Penzance		Bristol Hippodrome	
1982	Pass the Butler	Lady Charles	UK tour with Cambridge Theatre Company	
1982	Star Quality		Theatre Royal, Bath	
1982–1984	Aren't We All?	Angela Lynton	Theatre Royal Haymarket, London, Birmingham Repertory Theatre	
1986–1987	Aren't We All?	Angela Lynton	Australian tour	
1988	My Fair Lady	Mrs Higgins	State Theatre, Melbourne, Festival Theatre, Adelaide with VIC Arts Centre & VIC State Opera	
1988	Ring Round the Moon	Capulet	UK tour with Chichester Festival Theatre Company	
1992–1994	Medea	Nurse	UK tour with Almeida Theatre Company	
1993	A Murder of No Importance	Lady Clementina Beauchamp	Theatre Royal, Windsor, Yvonne Arnaud Theatre, Guildford	

== Radio ==
Year	Title	Role	Notes	Ref.
1930s	One Man's Family	Mother	2CH / 3XY	
1942	Space Explorers	Aunt Florence	ABC Radio / 2FC	
1948	Consulting Room		ABC Radio	
1940s–1950s	Medical File			
1951	A Town Like Alice	Jean Paget	ABC Radio	
1952	Ticket of Leave	Molly Dooker	ABC Radio variety show on 2FC	
1954	Fat Man		2UW	
1954–1955	Reach for the Sky		2UE	
1955	White Coolies	Sister Blanche Hempsted	5KA / 5AU / 5RM	
1956	The Clock	Lili	Episode 30: "The Island Paradise"	
1956	Tight Spot			
	Blue Hills			
