= Kaleidoscope (organisation) =

- Industry: Television and radio research
- Founded: 1987; 39 years ago
- Headquarters: Birmingham, West Midlands, England
- Products: Books Films
- Revenue: Nonprofit
- Website: https://www.tvbrain.info/

Kaleidoscope (The Classic Television Organisation), is a British nonprofit organisation that recovers and stores classic television programmes in their archive. In the past the organisation has staged television festivals in the West Midlands area, having release numerous television research guides. Proceeds from such events are donated to the Royal National Lifeboat Institution.

== History ==
Kaleidoscope was formed in 1988 by television enthusiasts to show appreciation and to research vintage television shows. In late 2013, ten years after Bob Monkhouse died, a large number of television and radio programmes were donated to Kaleidoscope from Monkhouse's archive.

From 1993, along with the British Film Institute Kaleidoscope have been running a campaign called Missing, Believed Wiped (sometimes called: Raiders of the Lost Archive). The campaign has led to numerous episodes being recovered from Steptoe and Son, Dad's Army, a Dennis Potter play and more than sixty classic BBC or ITV programmes from 1957 to 1969 in the Library of Congress

The organisation was also featured in a 2015 edition of BBC television programme Inside Out which discussed the subject of missing television.

=== Notable recoveries ===
- The Avengers – one episode.
- Celebrity Squares – twenty five episodes
- The Golden Shot – fourteen episodes
- Ivor the Engine – two seasons of early editions
- Late Night Horror – one episode
- The Likely Lads – two episodes
- Out of the Unknown – one episode
- Play School – two editions
- Sale of the Century – two episodes
- Till Death Us Do Part – two episodes
- Top of the Pops – five episodes
- Z Cars – four episodes

== See also ==
- Wiping
- Missing Believed Wiped
- BBC Archive Treasure Hunt
- Doctor Who missing episodes
- Dad's Army missing episodes
