= Missing Believed Wiped =

British annual event

Missing Believed Wiped is an annual event hosted by the British Film Institute that screens previously "wiped" television material from the UK that has recently been recovered.

Missing Believed Wiped was founded in 1993 by Dick Fiddy, who remains involved in the event at the BFI Southbank. There has also been a public effort using television spots and other media to raise awareness. Past events have featured material recovered from the personal collection of comedian Bob Monkhouse, while the 2010 event featured extracts from drama recordings found at the Library of Congress in the United States.

The 2011 event on 11 December featured an early Dennis Potter play Emergency – Ward 9, two rediscovered episodes of Doctor Who, and footage of David Bowie's performance of "The Jean Genie" on Top of the Pops on 4 January 1973, which was believed to have been lost. The two Doctor Who episodes were part 3 of "Galaxy 4" (Hartnell era) and part 2 of "The Underwater Menace" (Troughton era).

== See also ==
- Kaleidoscope
- BBC Archive Treasure Hunt
- Doctor Who missing episodes
- Dad's Army missing episodes
