= Emergency – Ward 9 =

Emergency – Ward 9 is a Dennis Potter television play first broadcast on BBC1 in the Thirty-Minute Theatre series on 11 April 1966.

Potter had praised the storylines and sense of urgency of the ITV hospital soap Emergency – Ward 10 in his television reviews for the Daily Herald. He was inspired to write a play that connected his experiences in a National Health hospital with events depicted in the series. Potter's script specifies an "Alf Garnett-type" character who suddenly finds himself sharing a ward with a black man. The play was controversial for its unflinching depiction of institutionalised racism but was critically applauded.

The play was repeated eighteen months after its first transmission. For many years, a recording was thought not to have survived, but a recording of the play resurfaced and was screened at the BFI's Missing Believed Wiped event in December 2011.
