= Mary Ridge =

British TV director (1925–2000)

- Ridge, from a 1968 newspaper
- Born: Eileen Mary Ridge; 23 June 1925; Preston, Lancashire, England
- Died: 20 September 2000 (aged 75); Fulham, London, England
- Occupation: Television director

Eileen Mary Ridge (23 June 1925 – 20 September 2000) was a British television director, best known for directing episodes of Blake's 7 and Doctor Who in the early 1980s.

== Early life ==
Ridge was born in Preston, Lancashire, and raised in Colwyn Bay, Wales, the daughter of William W. Ridge and Eileen Dorothy Phillips Hackett Ridge. She had an older brother, Alan, who she was very close to. Her father was a bank manager. Ridge attended the Lyndon School in Colwyn Bay.

== Career ==
Ridge acted and directed in theatrical productions in Colwyn Bay as a young woman. She directed a play, To Kill a Cat by Roland Pertwee and Harold Dearden, in 1955. In a 1999 interview, Ridge said that she worked in repertory theatre and briefly taught stage management at the Central School. She stated that she had wanted to "have a go" at directing television from 1956, but in that era around a decade of theatrical experience was expected to break into television work, and then she was required to enter at the bottom as an Assistant Floor Manager. She had intended to return to theatrical direction but described herself as having become "somewhat hooked" on directing for television.

Her television work began in 1964. She directed The Bond (1965), a play about the gulf between generations, under The Wednesday Play umbrella. In 1968, she directed the Christmas Day episode of The Newcomers. In 1976, she directed an adaptation of Buchi Emecheta's Nigeria A Kind of Marriage. In the early 1980s she directed multiple episodes of two science-fiction series for the BBC: Blake's 7 (1980–81) and the serial Terminus of Doctor Who (1983). Her other television work includes episodes of The Brothers, Thirty-Minute Theatre, The Long Street (1971), The Runaway Summer, Angels (1979–80, 1982–83), The District Nurse (1984), Dixon of Dock Green and Z-Cars. She served as Associate Producer on The Duchess of Duke Street.

Ridge was "renowned for a tight sense of planning, total precision in the studio, especially from her camera teams, and an ability to produce drama with a good sense of pace," noted one fanzine profile in 1996.

=== Blake's 7 ===
Her work on Blake's 7 began with directing the third-season finale ("Terminal"; 1980), which was originally intended to be the show's finale. The Liberator, a "series icon", was destroyed, involving work with explosives and an unusual reliance on special effects. Ridge later commented that she had "felt quite guilty" about the Liberator's demise, adding that "Battles and explosions are a director's heaven, and they're terribly exciting when they work." Alan Stevens and Fiona Moore describe the episode as among "most postmodern and allegorical" of the series; the scenes on the planet with Avon (Paul Darrow's character) are accompanied by an "ominous heartbeat-like sound", which Stevens and Moore compare with "The Tell-Tale Heart" by Edgar Allan Poe. "Terminal" had viewing figures of 10 million, and Stevens and Moore credit the show's renewal for a fourth season to the enthusiasm of Bill Cotton, then the head of BBC Television, for this episode.

Ridge became a regular director for season 4, and had input into the design of the set of Scorpio, the crew's new ship, suggesting, for example, the insertion of trap doors to allow more variety in camera angles. She directed five episodes of season 4, including the season opener "Rescue". Her direction of "Headhunter" gained praise from Stevens and Moore; the critic John Kenneth Muir writes that the android's attack sequence is directed "with aplomb, never allowing the pace to slow down once the attack has begun." Her most notable contribution, however, is the final episode, "Blake", in which Gareth Thomas returns as Blake, only to be shot dead by Avon, and then almost the entire cast apparently die. Ridge stated in an interview that she had been given considerable leeway over the way in which the final shootout played out; she made Avon killing Blake the focus, and decided to film the final scene in slow motion to give it a "slightly unreal feeling", to allow for a subsequent season, which was not commissioned. Stevens and Moore consider "Blake" to be perhaps the show's strongest episode; they compare the shootout sequence to the classic western, The Wild Bunch, and the final freeze-frame with Avon still standing and shots sounding over the credits to Butch Cassidy and the Sundance Kid. The journalist Joe Nazzaro describes the episode as a "stunning cliffhanger" that guaranteed the show "a place in SF television history". Muir considers much of the show's reputation to derive from "Blake", with its "stunning and ultraviolent conclusion"; he adds that the decision to kill the cast members "infuriated legions of fans, but also cemented Blake's 7's reputation as a go-for-the-throat vision." Ridge recounted receiving hate mail from fans over the episode.

Ridge coined the nickname "Blint" for Darrow, referring to Burt Lancaster and Clint Eastwood.

=== Doctor Who ===
After the end of Blake's 7, Ridge went on to direct the Doctor Who 4-part serial Terminus (1983), a plague ship story from the Peter Davison era that focuses on the Doctor's companion Nyssa, played by Sarah Sutton. Muir describes it as a "well-presented story", describing Ridge as a "skilled technician".

Ridge had previously worked with John Nathan-Turner, the producer, and considered him a friend. Production did not run smoothly, marred by an electricians' strike as well as problems with costumes and the set; this resulted in recording overrunning. Ridge's relationship with Nathan-Turner suffered, and she never directed for the show again.

== Personal life ==
Mary Ridge lived her later years in Strand on the Green, London. She was close to her family, including her brother, and the families of her two nephews and her niece. Mary Ridge died in Fulham, London, in 2000, aged 75 years.
