= Lyn Ashley =

Australian actress

- Born: Lynette Ashley Rumble; 18 March 1940 (age 86); Townsville, Queensland, Australia
- Occupation: Actress
- Spouse: Eric Idle (m. 1969; div. 1975)
- Children: 1
- Parent: Madge Ryan (mother)

Lyn Ashley (born Lynette Ashley Rumble; 18 March 1940) is an Australian actress who worked in the United Kingdom on television during the 1960s.

== Early life ==
Ashley was born Lynette Ashley Rumble in Townsville, Queensland, on 18 March 1940. She is the daughter of actress Madge Ryan.

== Career ==
Her television credits include Maigret, The Saint, Danger Man, Compact, Doctor Who and Monty Python's Flying Circus. When sketches from the show were performed on stage in Monty Python Live at Drury Lane, she played the parts originally performed by Carol Cleveland, who was unavailable at the time. She screen tested for Emma Peel's replacement on The Avengers.

She also acted in films such as Mister Ten Per Cent (1967), I'll Never Forget What's'isname (1967) and Quest for Love (1971).

Ashley was married to Monty Python member Eric Idle from 1969 until 1975; they have one son together, born in 1973. She was frequently credited on Monty Python's Flying Circus as 'Mrs Idle'. She also appeared in Idle's TV show Rutland Weekend Television.

She was later a cast member of the early 1990s soap opera Families.
