= List of British films of 2008 =

A list of British films released in 2008.

Title	Director	Cast	Genre	Notes
Adulthood	Noel Clarke	Noel Clarke, Scarlett Alice Johnson, Jacob Anderson	Drama	
Agent Crush	Sean Robinson	Brian Blessed, Neve Campbell	Animation	
Angus, Thongs and Perfect Snogging	Gurinder Chadha	Georgia Groome, Alan Davies, Aaron Johnson	Romantic comedy	
The Bank Job	Roger Donaldson	Jason Statham, Saffron Burrows	Thriller	
Be Like Others	Tanaz Eshaghian		Documentary	
The Boy in the Striped Pyjamas	Mark Herman	David Thewlis, Asa Butterfield	World War II drama	
Brideshead Revisited	Julian Jarrold	Emma Thompson, Michael Gambon	Literary drama	
Broken Lines	Sallie Aprahamian	Paul Bettany, Olivia Williams	Drama	
A Bunch of Amateurs	Andy Cadiff	Burt Reynolds, Samantha Bond	Comedy	
Cash and Curry	Sarjit Bains	Ameet Chana, Ronny Jhutti	Comedy	
Caught in the Act	Matt Lipsey	Steve Speirs, Sarah Barrand, Freddie Jones	Comedy	
The Children	Tom Shankland	Eva Birthistle, Stephen Campbell Moore, Jeremy Sheffield, Hannah Tointon	Horror	
The Chronicles of Narnia: Prince Caspian	Andrew Adamson	Ben Barnes, Georgie Henley, Skandar Keynes, William Moseley	Fantasy	
A Complete History of My Sexual Failures	Chris Waitt		Documentary	
The Cottage	Paul Andrew Williams	Andy Serkis, Reece Shearsmith	Comedy/horror	
The Dark Knight	Christopher Nolan	Christian Bale, Michael Caine, Heath Ledger, Gary Oldman, Aaron Eckhart, Maggie Gyllenhaal, Morgan Freeman	Superhero/action	
Death Defying Acts	Gillian Armstrong	Guy Pearce, Catherine Zeta-Jones	Romance/thriller	Co-production with Australia
Doomsday	Neil Marshall	Rhona Mitra, Bob Hoskins, Malcolm McDowell	Sci-fi/action	
The Duchess	Saul Dibb	Keira Knightley, Hayley Atwell, Ralph Fiennes	Historical drama	Winner of Academy Award and BAFTA for Best Costume Design
Easy Virtue	Stephan Elliott	Colin Firth, Kristin Scott Thomas	Drama	
Eden Lake	James Watkins	Kelly Reilly, Michael Fassbender, Jack O'Connell	Horror	
The Edge of Love	John Maybury	Keira Knightley, Sienna Miller	Drama	
The Escapist	Rupert Wyatt	Brian Cox, Joseph Fiennes, Damian Lewis	Thriller	
Faintheart	Vito Rocco	Eddie Marsan, Ewan Bremner, Jessica Hynes	Comedy	
Fifty Dead Men Walking	Kari Skogland	Ben Kingsley, Jim Sturgess	Thriller	
Filth and Wisdom	Madonna	Eugene Hütz, Holly Weston, Vicky McClure, Richard E. Grant, Olegar Fedoro	Comedy-drama	Premiered at the 58th Berlin International Film Festival
Flashbacks of a Fool	Baillie Walsh	Daniel Craig, Harry Eden	Drama	
Franklyn	Gerald McMorrow	Ryan Phillippe, Eva Green, Sam Riley	Neo-noir	
Freebird	Jon Ivay	Phil Daniels, Gary Stretch	Comedy	
French Film	Jackie Oudney	Anne-Marie Duff, Hugh Bonneville	Comedy	
Gardens of the Night	Damian Harris	Gillian Jacobs, Evan Ross, Jeremy Sisto, Harold Perrineau, Kyle Gallner, John Malkovich, Kevin Zegers, Tom Arnold	Drama	Premiered at the 58th Berlin International Film Festival
The Gateway Meat	Ron DeCaro	David Barry, Baro Carvalho, Christianne Cicilio	Horror	
Good	Vicente Amorim	Viggo Mortensen, Jason Isaacs	Drama	
The Grind	Rishi Opel	Jamie Foreman, Zoe Tapper, Danny John-Jules	Crime	
Happy-Go-Lucky	Mike Leigh	Sally Hawkins, Eddie Marsan	Drama	Winner of the Best Actress Prize at the Berlin Film Festival and the Golden Globe for Best Actress (Comedy or Musical)
How to Lose Friends & Alienate People	Robert B. Weide	Simon Pegg, Megan Fox, Kirsten Dunst	Comedy	
Hunger	Steve McQueen	Michael Fassbender	Drama	Winner of the Caméra d'Or award at the 2008 Cannes Film Festival
In Your Dreams	Gary Sinyor	Dexter Fletcher, Elize du Toit, Parminder Nagra	Romance/comedy	
Incendiary	Sharon Maguire	Michelle Williams, Ewan McGregor	Drama	
Inkheart	Iain Softley	Brendan Fraser, Eliza Bennett, Paul Bettany, Helen Mirren	Fantasy	Co-production with the US
Lady Godiva	Vicky Jewson	Phoebe Thomas, Matthew Chambers, Natalie Walter	Romance/comedy	
Lecture 21	Alessandro Baricco	John Hurt, Leonor Watling	Drama	
Love Live Long	Mike Figgis	Daniel Lapaine, Sophie Winkleman	Drama	
Mamma Mia!	Phyllida Lloyd	Meryl Streep, Pierce Brosnan, Colin Firth, Stellan Skarsgård	Musical	Highest grossing British film and highest selling DVD of all time in the UK
Man on Wire	James Marsh	Philippe Petit	Documentary	Petit's 1974 high-wire walk between the Twin Towers; winner of the Academy Award for Best Documentary (Feature), the BAFTA Award for Best British Film and the Satellite Award for Best Documentary Film
Manolete	Menno Meyjes	Adrien Brody, Penélope Cruz	Biopic	Co-production with Spain
A Matter of Loaf and Death	Nick Park	Peter Sallis, Sally Lindsay	Animated short	Winner of BAFTA for Best Animated Short
Of Time and the City	Terence Davies		Documentary	
The Other Man	Richard Eyre	Liam Neeson, Antonio Banderas	Drama	Co-production with the US
The Oxford Murders	Álex de la Iglesia	Elijah Wood, John Hurt	Mystery	
Quantum of Solace	Marc Forster	Daniel Craig, Olga Kurylenko, Mathieu Amalric, Judi Dench	Spy/action	James Bond Film
Promised Land of Heavy Metal	Tanja Karttunen		Documentary/music	Co-production with Finland
Red Mist	Paddy Breathnach	Arielle Kebbel, Christina Chong, MyAnna Buring	Horror	
Revolutionary Road	Sam Mendes	Leonardo DiCaprio, Kate Winslet, Michael Shannon, Kathryn Hahn, David Harbour, Kathy Bates	Romantic drama	Co-production with the US
RocknRolla	Guy Ritchie	Gerard Butler, Tom Wilkinson, Mark Strong, Thandie Newton	Crime drama	
Slumdog Millionaire	Danny Boyle	Dev Patel, Freida Pinto, Anil Kapoor	Drama	Eight Oscar wins including Best Picture and Best Director
Son of Rambow	Garth Jennings	Bill Milner, Will Poulter	Family comedy-drama	
Three and Out	Jonathan Gershfield	Mackenzie Crook, Colm Meaney, Gemma Arterton, Imelda Staunton	Tragic comedy	
Transsiberian	Brad Anderson	Woody Harrelson, Emily Mortimer, Ben Kingsley	Thriller	
Tropic Thunder	Ben Stiller	Ben Stiller, Jack Black, Robert Downey Jr., Steve Coogan, Jay Baruchel, Danny McBride, Brandon T. Jackson, Bill Hader, Nick Nolte	Satirical action comedy	
Wild Child	Nick Moore	Emma Roberts, Alex Pettyfer	Romantic comedy	

== See also ==
- 2008 in film
- 2008 in British music
- 2008 in British radio
- 2008 in British television
- 2008 in the United Kingdom
- List of 2008 box office number-one films in the United Kingdom
