= Barry Jackson (actor) =

English actor (1938–2013)

Barry Michael Jackson
- Born: 29 March 1938; Birmingham, Warwickshire, England
- Died: 5 December 2013 (aged 75); London, England
- Education: LAMDA
- Occupation: Actor
- Years active: 1956–2013
- Known for: Midsomer Murders
- Spouse: Denise Jackson
- Children: 6

Barry Michael Jackson (29 March 1938 – 5 December 2013) was an English stage, film and television actor. He appeared in the first fourteen series of Midsomer Murders as Doctor George Bullard, the pathologist.

== Early life ==
Jackson was educated at King Edward VI Five Ways Grammar School and trained at the London Academy of Music and Dramatic Art, before beginning his career in repertory theatre.

== Career ==
Jackson's film career included roles in Ryan's Daughter, Barry Lyndon, Aces High, The Raging Moon, Mr. Love, and Wimbledon.

Jackson's television credits included A for Andromeda, The Mask of Janus, Adam Adamant Lives!, Doctor Who, Z-Cars, Dixon of Dock Green, Special Branch, The Troubleshooters, Man at the Top, Doomwatch, Public Eye, Poldark, Oil Strike North, The New Avengers, Blake's 7, The Professionals, Coronation Street, Enemy at the Door, All Creatures Great and Small, Minder, Bergerac, Lovejoy, Casualty, Peak Practice, Silent Witness, Kavanagh QC, The Bill, A Touch of Frost, Holby City, Heartbeat and Midsomer Murders.

Jackson appeared in Doctor Who in the show's original run, including the stories The Romans, Galaxy 4 and "Mission to the Unknown". Jackson later returned to the show and played "Drax," a school chum of the Doctor, in the Fourth Doctor story The Armageddon Factor. In 1977 he appeared as a Lock-Keeper in the Secret Army episode Identity in Doubt. This was followed in 1980 by his appearance as farmer Ken Billings in the All Creatures Great and Small episode Matters of Life and Death. Jackson later played another Yorkshire farmer, Jim Hobson, in the Heartbeat episode Risky Business.

Jackson also starred in Horace, a drama about a middle-aged man with the mind of a 10-year-old. Written by Roy Minton and directed by Alan Clarke, it was a one-off television play broadcast as part of a BBC1 new play series on 21 March 1972. It was later revived as a TV series in 1982. It was arguably the first mainstream UK TV serial that had a person with a learning disability as the protagonist. All episodes are thought to be in existence but have yet to be released.

== Personal life and death ==
Jackson died in London on 5 December 2013, aged 75, from cancer. He was survived by his wife, Denise, and six children.

== Partial Filmography ==
Year	Title	Role	Notes
1962	The Primitives	Messenger	
1965	Strangler's Web	Morton Bray	
1966	Cathy Come Home	The Rent Collector	
1968	The Bofors Gun	Shone	
1969	Alfred the Great	Wulfstan	
1970	Ryan's Daughter	Corporal	
1971	The Raging Moon	Bill Charles	
1972	Play For Today	Horace	
1973	Diamonds on Wheels	Wheeler	
1975	Moll Flanders	William Stubbs	TV film
1975	Barry Lyndon	Second at the final duel	
1976	Aces High	Joyce	
1977	The Glitterball	Mr Fielding	
1978	The Sailor's Return	Carrier	
1982	Horace	Horace	TV series
1985	Mr. Love	Donald Lovelace	
1985	The Shooting Party	Weir	
1994	A Touch Of Frost	Walter Peters	TV series 2 episode 3
1997–2001	Bernard's Watch	Grandad	TV series
1997–2011	Midsomer Murders	George Bullard	TV series
2001	The Fourth Angel	Tarnowner	
2004	Wimbledon	Danny Oldham	
2009	Toscanini in His Own Words	Arturo Toscanini	
2011	Foster	Tom Jenkins	
2012	The Wedding Video	Des	
