= The Firm (1989 film) =

1989 British television drama film directed by Alan Clarke

- Written by: Al Hunter Ashton (as Al Hunter)
- Directed by: Alan Clarke
- Starring: Gary Oldman; Lesley Manville; Phil Davis; Charles Lawson
- Country of origin: United Kingdom
- Original language: English

Production
- Producer: David M. Thompson
- Cinematography: Ben Philpott; Richard Philpott; John Ward
- Editor: John Strickland
- Running time: 70 minutes

Original release
- Network: BBC
- Release: 26 February 1989

The Firm is a 1989 British made-for-television drama film directed by Alan Clarke and written by Al Hunter Ashton for the BBC. It stars Gary Oldman, Lesley Manville, Phil Davis, Charles Lawson and Steve McFadden in his acting debut. The film is based on the activities of the Inter City Firm (billed as the "Inter City Crew") football firm of West Ham United during the 1970s and 1980s.

The film, which courted controversy on release, has come to be regarded among the finest films on the subject of football hooliganism. It is notable for having almost no musical score or diegetic music, save for Dean Martin's rendition of "That's Amore" over the opening titles. Oldman's performance has been hailed as one of the greatest of his career.

== Plot ==
Clive Bissell (nicknamed "Bex", or "Bexy") (Bex Bissell being a brand of household appliances) is a married man with a baby son. He is the leader of a hooligan firm known as the ICC (Inter City Crew). His wife no longer approves of his activities as a football hooligan, which contrast to his respectable job as an estate agent. Even when his baby son injures himself with a craft knife Bexy has carelessly left lying around, he is unwilling to give up violence as he admits it gives him a "buzz". Conversely, Bexy's father shows acceptance of his son's lifestyle, happily taking a group photograph of the 'tooled up' gang and boasting of similar activities in his own era. However, he feels that Bex and his friends have gone soft because they now use weapons and worry too much about strategy, instead of just getting on with fighting rival mobs.

The film begins with a rival gang called "The Buccaneers" vandalising Bexy's Ford Sierra XR4x4 and spraying graffiti in a football dressing room while Bexy and his mates are playing football. Bexy's nemesis and leader of the Buccaneers, Yeti, then drives a white Volkswagen Golf GTi cabriolet across the football pitch.

With the imminent European Championship tournament in West Germany, Bexy wants to form a 'National Firm' – comprising several rival gangs – big enough to take on the well organised and large international hooligan groups. Bexy meets leaders from other firms in the Tower Hotel in London, including the Buccaneers. The other gangs like the idea, but do not like the idea of Bexy being top boy. The rival firms then agree to fight each other in order to determine who will lead the new, amalgamated firm into Europe.

Bex and his fellow hooligans only possess any kind of social status amongst their own groups, and Bex relishes being looked up to and admired by the younger men in his own firm. Bexy used his natural leadership qualities to cajole and encourage his peers, and uses intimidation to cement his position as leader of the ICC. These young men think of themselves as important, respected figures in their local community, but Bexy's wife tells him that the truth is somewhat different. Everyone thinks of him as a joke, she says, but because they fear his violent nature, few are willing to point out to him that he is not the working class hero he thinks he is.

The ICC survive violent clashes with the other gangs, but must still defeat the Buccaneers. Bexy is relishing the chance to defeat Yeti. Bexy beats up Yeti during the ICC's clash with the Buccaneers. In his last moments, Bexy expresses astonishment and disbelief that Yeti has a gun, and says 'Oh, come on!' before Yeti pulls the trigger.

The closing scene depicts the surviving ICC members in a pub, honouring Bexy as a hero. They claim, when they are fighting European firms at the forthcoming tournament, they will be doing so in memory of their dead leader. The hooligans from three different firms, who were fighting each other not long ago, agree that Bex was a visionary who brought them together, giving him legendary status, and that his death will not make them change their behaviour, as they vow to continue.

In the film's closing moments, the hooligan actors begin to attack the camera crew, throwing their drinks and chanting aggressively, thereby breaking the fourth wall and demonstrating that the events of the film are not entirely fictional.

== Cast ==
- Gary Oldman as Clive "Bex" Bissell
- Lesley Manville as Sue Bissell
- Albert Bentall as Sammy Bissell
- Phil Davis as "Yeti"
- Andrew Wilde as "Oboe"
- Charles Lawson as "Trigg"
- William Vanderpuye as "Aitch"
- Jay Simpson as Dominic
- Patrick Murray as "Nunk"
- Robbie Gee as "Snowy"
- Terry Sue-Patt as Yusef
- Nick Dunning as Simon
- Nicholas Hewetson as "Beef"
- Steve McFadden as Billy
- Steve Sweeney as J.T.
- Hepburn Graham as Stu

== Production ==
Alan Clarke had been making a series of challenging and complex films throughout the 80s, partly influenced by the use of the then-pioneering Steadicam. In 1998, dramatist and author David Hare commented that "Alan believes in a style which I describe as being a sort of democratic camera[...] The Firm is plainly the climax of the style and I think the masterpiece." In keeping with earlier films like Scum and Made in Britain, The Firm focuses primarily on characters who can be seen as lacking in redemptive qualities and are self-destructive.

Writer Al Hunter Ashton partially based the script on his own experiences, having been a member of a "firm" himself for some years.

The film itself was filmed in and around Thamesmead in the spring of 1988; Clarke was able to persuade Gary Oldman to take the lead role of Bex whilst the part of Sue was played by Oldman's then-wife Lesley Manville. As Oldman would later comment in 1998 "Alan[...] was a great one for discovering people" and The Firm features a number of actors whose profiles would become significantly more raised in the 1990s including Steve McFadden (later to play Phil Mitchell in EastEnders), Charles Lawson (later Jim MacDonald in Coronation Street) and Steve Sweeney (later Plank in Lock, Stock and Two Smoking Barrels). The child of Bex and Sue is played by the infant son of Janine Duvitski whom Clarke had worked with for Diane (1975).

The meeting of the three separate firms was filmed at the Tower Hotel on Tower Bridge; during the filming, a genuine fight started to occur between various members of the cast, resulting in some damage to the hotel itself.

The Firm was Alan Clarke's final film; producer David M. Thompson noted in a 1998 interview, "it was during the shooting of The Firm that Alan complained of backache. I remember vividly driving him to his osteopath. Of course, it wasn't backache at all." During the following year, Clarke was diagnosed with cancer, which would eventually result in his death in 1990.

== Reception and legacy ==
The Firm proved controversial, and has been both celebrated and condemned for its violent content. Tom Dawson in The List reported that it "is widely considered to be the toughest and most insightful screen depiction of football hooligans". Vice critic Harry Sword wrote that "The Firm remains the definitive celluloid document on football hooliganism: a panoramic masterpiece that captured a world of vicious violence and material aspiration". Philip French in The Observer described the film as "by some way the best movie on the subject of football hooliganism and a key text on the subject of Thatcher's Britain."

Film4 hailed The Firm as a "brilliant and compelling drama" that features Oldman "at his visceral, intense best". Josh Winning of Total Film observed its "unflinching depictions of violence" along with Clarke's "layered, fearless approach", and named Oldman's "stunning" performance as the best of his career. Matthew Thrift of the British Film Institute in 2018 wrote that Bissell "remains probably Gary Oldman's greatest screen performance".

The Firm has been described as a cult classic.

== Home media releases ==
The film was first released on VHS on 21 Oct 1996 in a double pack with the similarly themed I.D., with a standalone release following a few years later. A DVD was first released by Prism Leisure on 2 Feb 2004. The film has been sold as part of numerous box-sets, often packed in with other films of a similar nature or from director Clarke. On 10 Sep 2007 a special edition DVD (released in collectible SteelBook packaging) was released by the BBC. Extra features on the special edition include:

- An introduction to the film by David Leland
- A documentary on the life's work of Alan Clarke
- Timewatch: A documentary exploring the roots of football hooliganism
- The Late Show: Panel discussion and critical reaction to the film
- Audio commentary with Phil Davis and Lesley Manville

A version of the film with censored scenes restored from tape (including a more graphic version of Bex's blinding of Oboe, a scene of Bex mock-raping his wife, and Bex performing a knife attack on Yeti's private parts) was included in the 2016 DVD set Alan Clarke at the BBC, Volume 2: Disruption, and also released as a stand-alone DVD, both under the BFI's auspices and guidance.

== Remake ==
The story was adapted by Nick Love into the 2009 film of the same name.
