= Horace (television play) =

1972 British television play

Horace is a 1972 television play written by Roy Minton and directed by Alan Clarke, first broadcast as part of a BBC1 new play series on 21 March 1972.

== Plot ==
Diabetic Horace (Barry Jackson) is mentally impaired and works in a joke shop. He befriends loner schoolboy Gordon Blackett (Stephen Tantum), who retreats from his loveless home into an imaginary world.

== Cast ==
- Horace - Barry Jackson
- Gordon - Stephen Tantum
- Ivy - Christine Hargreaves
- Dick - Talfryn Thomas
- Mrs Radford - Hazel Coppen
- Sidney - James Mellor
- Miss Bowler - Patricia Lawrence
- Mr Scrimshaw - Robert Hartley
- Mr Frankel - Howard Goorney
- Whitsun - Ken Parry
- Brenda - Caleigh Simmons
- Mrs Beal - Daphne Heard
- Customer - Eric Francis
- Waitress - Pamela Miles
- Jeffries - Jeffrey Gardiner

== Critical reception ==
The Daily Telegraph wrote, "Never sentimentalised... sympathetic, touching The piece worked marvellously well."

== Television series ==
The play was later developed as a six-part half-hour series for Yorkshire Television.
