= A Man of Our Times =

1968 British TV series

- Genre: Drama
- Created by: Julian Bond
- Starring: George Cole
- Country of origin: United Kingdom
- Original language: English
- No. of series: 1
- No. of episodes: 13 (5 missing)

Production
- Producer: Richard Bates
- Production company: Rediffusion London

Original release
- Network: ITV
- Release: 4 January – 28 March 1968

A Man of Our Times is a 1968 British television series created by Rediffusion London for ITV and starring future Minder star George Cole.

== Plot ==
Max Osborne is a middle manager at a furniture factory in High Wycombe, suddenly he is faced with redundancy when the company is bought out. David Soames, the son of the factory owner and old army friend who got Max the job offers him a position as a manager of a subsidiary firm in Pearth, Australia. Muriel, Max's mistress thinks he should accept the job and promises that she and her daughter, Lucy will go to Australia with him as long as he divorces his wife, Sally and leaves his children, Clare and Michale behind.

== Cast ==
- George Cole as Max Osborne
- Jennifer Beevers as Muriel
- Jean Harvey as Sally Osborne
- Charles 'Bud' Tingwell as David Soames
- Diana Beevers as Gwen
- Gabrielle Blunt as Shirley
- Douglas Livingstone as Banks
- Clive Morton as Henry Soames
- Zuleika Robson as Lucy
- Lucy Appleby as Clare Osborne
- Christopher Witty as Michale Osborne
- Isabel Dean as Lydia Laing
- Norman Rossington as Dick Bush
- Basil Henson as Oliver Manson
- Norman Eshley as Simon Houlder

== Production notes ==
In 1968, George Cole said of his role as Max Osborne.

Max Osborne has been the best acting role I had ever had but also the most exhausting, there is a lot of emotional strain involved in playing a complicated character like Max. The part was perceptively written by Julian Bond and there was a wonderful cast supporting me, but I don't think I would have ever got through it if I had not had Penny and the children to go home to.

== Episode list ==
No.	Title	Directed by	Written by	Original release date	Archive status
1	"The Name of the Man"	Michael Lindsay-Hogg	Julian Bond	4 January 1968	Exists
2	"The Two Legged Chameleon"	Michael Lindsay-Hogg	Julian Bond	11 January 1968	Exists
3	"Sally Go Round the Moon"	Alan Clarke	Julian Bond	18 January 1968	Exists
4	"Got Yourself Sorted Out at All?"	Alan Clarke	Julian Bond	25 January 1968	Missing
5	"All Things Look Different Though Custard Cream"	Alastair Reid	Douglas Livingstone	1 February 1968	Exists
6	"Uncle Richard Knows Him Better Than You"	Alastair Reid	Douglas Livingstone	8 February 1968	Missing
7	"The Dream Time"	Alastair Reid	Arden Winch	15 February 1968	Missing
8	"Which Side Are You On?"	Gareth Davies	Roy Russell	22 February 1968	Missing
9	"You Know Who Your Friends Are"	Gareth Davies	Roy Russell	29 February 1968	Exists
10	"Someone I Knew"	Bill Bain	Julian Bond	7 March 1968	Exists
11	"Never Mind How We Got Here, Where Are We?"	Alan Clarke	Julian Bond	14 March 1968	Missing
12	"If Only Wishing Could End as Loving?"	Michael Lindsay-Hogg	Julian Bond	21 March 1968	Exists
13	"Long Time Since You've Got My Breakfast"	Bill Bain	Julian Bond	28 March 1968	Exists

== Missing episodes ==
5 of the 13 episodes produced are missing.
