= Scum (television play) =

- Title card
- Written by: Roy Minton
- Directed by: Alan Clarke
- Starring: Ray Winstone; David Threlfall; Martin Phillips; John Blundell; Phil Daniels; Davidson Knight
- Country of origin: United Kingdom
- Original language: English

Production
- Producer: Margaret Matheson
- Cinematography: John Wyatt
- Editor: Ken Pearce
- Running time: 78 minutes

Original release
- Network: BBC2
- Release: 27 July 1991

Scum is a 1977 British television play written by Roy Minton and directed by Alan Clarke. It was intended to be screened as part of the Play for Today series. Instead the production was banned by the BBC after it was completed in 1977 and not aired until BBC 2 showed it on 27 July 1991. In the interim, a theatrical film version was released in 1979. The original version features Ray Winstone (in one of his earliest roles), John Blundell, David Threlfall, Martin Phillips, Phil Daniels and Davidson Knight.

== Plot ==
Three young delinquents, Carlin, Davis and Angel, are escorted via van to a British borstal. (The title sequence shows Davis trying to escape from an "open" borstal and being rounded up by the warders.) Once they arrive, they are given rooms. Angel and Davis are allotted private rooms whilst Carlin has to stay in a dormitory. Carlin, who was transferred from another borstal as punishment for attacking an officer, is thoroughly told by the senior officer Mr. Sands that he expects no trouble and he will be severely punished for any transgressions. Shortly afterwards, Carlin strikes up a friendship with Archer, an intellectual (albeit eccentric) inmate who does everything he can to annoy the administration and its warders. Banks, the "daddy" (head inmate) of the wing is informed of Carlin's reputation and told to keep him in line. That night, Banks and his crony Richards assault Carlin, leaving his face bruised. Due to this, he is mistakenly accused of fighting by Sands and given three days solitary confinement as punishment.

After serving his punishment, Carlin seeks revenge on Banks and Richards by first attacking Richards and then beating Banks and replacing him as the "daddy" of the wing. Carlin then makes a deal with house officer Mr. Goodyear. In exchange for a single room cell, Carlin will use his "natural leader" skills to keep peace in the wing. Carlin asks a new inmate named Rhodes to be his "missus", although Carlin stresses he is not homosexual. A short while after, whilst Davis is working in the greenhouse, he is assaulted and gang raped by two boys. Sands looks in the window and sees the rape but merely smiles and walks away. Later that night, Davis, traumatised by the rape, asks warder Mr. Greaves for help but is merely berated by him. Davis later slashes his wrists in his cell and dies as a result. His body is found the next morning by Sands.

The following day during breakfast, the boys refuse to eat in protest against Davis' death. Carlin then incites a riot. (Ray Winstone recalled that he and several others intended to give John Judd a real beating in the scene, as he had taken a bit too well to his role as the brutal warder Sands but Judd got wind of the plan and scrambled to get out of the mess hall, which only added to the effect of the riot.) Later, Carlin, Archer and several others are led away by guards, handcuffed. The Governor of the borstal makes an announcement to all the inmates stating he will tolerate no further outbursts. He then declares a minute silent prayer in Davis' memory. In a grimly ironic touch, the boys who raped Davis are in the front row of the assembly.

== Cast ==
=== Inmates ===
- Ray Winstone as Carlin
- David Threlfall as Archer
- Martin Phillips as Davis
- John Blundell as Banks
- Phil Daniels as Richards
- Davidson Knight as Angel
- Ray Burdis as Eckersley
- Patrick Murray as Dougan
- Ian Sharrock as Rhodes
- Peter Francis as Baldy
- Tony London as Woods
- Peter Kinley as Betts
- Trevor Butler as Toyne
- Sheridan Earl Russell as Jackson
- Philip DaCosta as Formby
- Colin Mayes as Sumner
- Michael Deeks as Trainee

=== Borstal staff ===
- Richard Butler as The Governor
- John Judd as Mr. Sands
- Stewart Harwood as Mr. Greaves
- Peter Gordon as Mr. Goodyear
- George Lee as Chief Officer
- Bay White as Matron
- Dennis Castle as Mr. Duke
- Robin Hopwood as Mr. Burton
- David Stockton as White
- Julian Hudson as P.T Instructor
- Ray Jewers as Block Officer

== Ban ==
To protect against possible trouble, considerable research was undertaken to establish the authenticity of the drama, although executives in the corporation considered it unrealistic, according to Play for Today producer Margaret Matheson, because of the potential confusion between documentary and drama because of the detailed representation. An 'Early Warning Synopsis' practice existed in the BBC between producers and their superiors whereby details of a programme's content was communicated. In the case of Scum, this had been seen by the controller of BBC 1, Bryan Cowgill, without any problems being raised. A change in personnel, with Bill Cotton succeeding Cowgill, soon led to difficulties in October 1977 when the completed work was awaiting its transmission.

Some cuts were made at Cotton's request, an earlier suicide was removed; those involved in the play hoped the edits would prevent it being banned, to no avail. The play was not transmitted. Matheson managed to screen the film for the press, outside the BBC in a Soho preview theatre, which did result in press coverage about the suppression, not necessarily favourable to itself. At the screening, Minton dubbed the production the 'Billy Cotton Banned Show' after the light-entertainment programme Billy Cotton Band Show, hosted by the BBC executive's father.
