= Stand by Your Screen =

Stand By Your Screen was a 1968 play written by Roy Minton and directed by Alan Clarke.

== Plot ==
Christopher Gritter John Neville revolts against the suburban conformity of his parents.

== Performances ==
First broadcast London Weekend Television 8 December 1968. It was 52 mins long.

== Cast ==
- John Neville as Christopher Gritter
- Ann Bell as Bess Hogg
- Cyril Luckham as Norman Gritter
- Patricia Lawrence as May Green
