= The Heavy (film) =

- Theatrical poster
- Directed by: Marcus Warren
- Written by: Marcus Warren
- Produced by: John Cairns
- Starring: Gary Stretch; Vinnie Jones; Christopher Lee; Lee Ryan; Shannyn Sossamon; Stephen Rea
- Cinematography: Marcus Warren
- Edited by: David Head
- Music by: Paul Oakenfold
- Production companies: Heavy Productions; Contraption Limited
- Distributed by: Parkland Pictures
- Release date: 15 April 2010 (United Kingdom)
- Running time: 102 minutes
- Countries: United Kingdom; United States
- Language: English
- Budget: $4.5 million

The Heavy is a 2010 thriller film directed by Marcus Warren and stars Vinnie Jones, Gary Stretch, Shannyn Sossamon, and Christopher Lee. It also features the screen debut of Blue member Lee Ryan.

== Plot ==
The film is about rivalry and betrayal between two brothers. One is a candidate for Prime Minister and the other is a henchman for a businessman. When one is given the opportunity to take revenge against the other, he must come to terms with the truth and face a world where trust doesn't exist and loyalty is rare.

== Cast ==
- Gary Stretch as Mitchell "Boots" Mason
- Vinnie Jones as Edgar Dunn
- Stephen Rea as Jameson Anawalt
- Shannyn Sossamon as Claire
- Christopher Lee as Mr. Mason
- Lee Ryan as Reuben
- Adrian Paul as Christian Mason
- Jean Marsh as Mrs. Mason
- Sadie Frost as Dutch
- Geoff Bell as Frank Marshall
- George Harris as Doctor
- Luing Andrews as Vladimir

== Release ==
The film was released on 16 April 2010 direct to DVD in the United States and received a limited theatrical release in the UK on the same day. The film was dedicated to the memory of producer John Daly.

== Soundtrack ==
The score was composed by British Trance DJ Paul Oakenfold.
