= David Heap (actor) =

Ireland-based actor (1949–2025)

David Richard Heap (21 May 1949 – 30 December 2025) was an English-born Ireland-based actor.

== Early life and career ==
Born in Cinderford, Gloucestershire, Heap initially worked for Procter & Gamble before later studying acting at the Bristol Old Vic Theatre School. He moved to Ireland after playing the role of Captain Lancey in the world premiere of Translations by Brian Friel in 1980. Heap also performed in many Gate Theatre productions, including Salomé, The Importance of being Earnest and Les Liaisons Dangereuses.

Heap's best-known television acting role was that of Donal Maher in Fair City, a role he played from 1996 until 2004. He also played Brian Noonan, a junior minister and personal friend of Bishop Brennan in the comedy series Father Ted.

== Personal life and death ==
Heap had a daughter with Barbara Bradshaw in 1981. He married the actor Olwen Fouéré in 1984 with whom he had two children, a daughter Morgane and a son JoJo, who both died in infancy. Heap was diagnosed with Corticobasal syndrome, a rare neurodegenerative disease, in 2024 and died on 30 December 2025, at the age of 76. He is survived by his wife Olwen, his daughter Laura Bradshaw-Heap and his two grandchildren Olivia and Todor Hadzi-Jovancic

== Selected filmography ==
- Botched
- The Boxer
- Byzantium
- The Professor and the Madman
- The Secret Scripture
- St. Ives
