= Elephant (1989 film) =

- Directed by: Alan Clarke
- Country of origin: Northern Ireland
- Original language: English

Production
- Producer: Danny Boyle
- Cinematography: Philip Dawson; John Ward
- Editor: Don O'Donovan
- Running time: 38 minutes

Original release
- Network: BBC Northern Ireland
- Release: 25 January 1989

Elephant is a 1989 British short film directed by Alan Clarke and produced by Danny Boyle. The film is set in Northern Ireland during the Troubles and its title comes from Bernard MacLaverty's description of the conflict as "the elephant in our living room" — a reference to the collective denial of the underlying social problems of Northern Ireland. Produced by BBC Northern Ireland, it first screened on BBC2 in 1989. The film was first conceived by Boyle, who was working as a producer for BBC Northern Ireland at the time.

The film, which contains very little dialogue, depicts eighteen murders and is partly based on actual events drawn from police reports at the time. It is shot on 16mm and features a series of tracking shots filmed using a steadicam, a technique the director used regularly. The grainy 16mm film, together with the lack of dialogue, plot, narrative and music, give the film a cold, observational documentary feel. Nothing is learnt about any of the gunmen or victims. Each of the murders is carried out calmly and casually; in one scene the gunman is seen to drive away slowly, even stopping to give way for traffic. Most of the vignettes end with the camera lingering on the motionless body of the victim.

As with several of Clarke's films, Elephant received high praise and attracted controversy. After watching the film, Clarke's contemporary David Leland wrote: "I remember lying in bed, watching it, thinking, 'Stop, Alan, you can't keep doing this.' And the cumulative effect is that you say, 'It's got to stop. The killing has got to stop.' Instinctively, without an intellectual process, it becomes a gut reaction."

Contrary to popular belief, the film did not influence Gus Van Sant's film of the same name. Van Sant learned of Clarke's film upon a recommendation from a producer after the producer had read the treatment for Elephant.
