= John Blundell (actor) =

British actor

John Blundell is a British actor, best known for playing 'Daddy' Pongo Banks in the controversial production Scum and its film adaptation.

Blundell played Banks in both the banned 1977 BBC version and the cinematic remake of the production two years later. His character was the 'daddy' (i.e., the self-appointed head inmate via use of force, violence and intimidation) of the institution until he was overthrown in a bloody attack by Carlin, the lead character played by Ray Winstone. He also appeared in Quadrophenia as the Leader of the Rockers (again in a film with Ray Winstone).

In 1978, he played O'Fred in Junket 89.

Afterwards, Blundell appeared in many other television shows, to name a few, Just Good Friends, Juliet Bravo, Grange Hill, Girls on Top, L for Lester, Eastenders, as well as some feature films including Whoops Apocalypse and Nil by Mouth. Blundell did spend a long period of time at the National Theatre. He had a small role, again with Winstone in the lead, in Nil by Mouth in 1997. He also starred and co-wrote the hit children's series, You Must Be Joking (1974–1976).

He also acted in various commercials and was known as the 'Commercial King', by his Agent Anna Scher, due to the number of Commercials he appeared in for British Airways, De beers diamonds, Cadbury's.
