= Patrick Murray (actor) =

British actor (1956–2025)

- Murray as Mickey Pearce from Only Fools and Horses (1989)
- Born: Patrick Noel Murray; 17 December 1956; Greenwich, London, England
- Died: 29 September 2025 (aged 68); Rochester, Kent, England
- Occupation: Actor
- Years active: 1973–2023
- Spouses: Shelley Wilkinson (m. 1981; div. 1996) Anong Murray (m. 2016)
- Children: 4

Patrick Noel Murray (17 December 1956 – 29 September 2025) was a British actor. He was best known for playing Mickey Pearce in the British sitcom television series Only Fools and Horses from 1983 to 2003. He also had roles in ITV Playhouse (1977), Scum and Quadrophenia (1979), Breaking Glass (1980), Curse of the Pink Panther (1983), Bergerac (1983), Dempsey and Makepeace (1986), and The Firm (1989).

== Early life and career ==
Patrick Noel Murray was born on 17 December 1956 in Greenwich, London, the son of Juana Romero, a Spanish dancer and Patrick Murray, an Irish tunnel miner. He attended St Thomas the Apostle College. He started acting in stage plays when he turned 15 after seeing a theatrical agency advert.

One of his first roles was in the television series The Terracotta Horse, playing the character David Jackson, which earned him some initial recognition. In 1977, he appeared in the television play Scum, playing the character Dougan alongside Ray Winstone's Carlin. Following the BBC's banning of the broadcast due to excessive violence, its director, Alan Clarke, remade the play into a feature film of the same name in 1979, where Murray was one of the six original cast members to reprise their roles. Following this, Murray would continue to make small appearances in films, such as in Quadrophenia (1979) alongside Sting, Toyah Willcox, Michael Elphick and Timothy Spall, in Breaking Glass (1980), and as the bellboy in Curse of the Pink Panther (1983).

Murray's longest role was as Mickey Pearce in 20 episodes of Only Fools and Horses between 1983–2003, starring alongside David Jason and Nicholas Lyndhurst. First mentioned in episodes starting in 1981 before making a physical appearance in the 1983 Healthy Competition, according to Murray, the character was conceived as a "Del Boy-lite". Murray was auditioned for the role after producer Ray Butt had noticed him in a television advertisement for Pizza Hut. He started working on the show three days after his audition. His role as Mickey has since been described as a fan-favourite of the series, and would regularly appear at Only Fools fan conventions; his popularity caused him to make regular appearances in the show up to its finale in Christmas 2003. This role led to him being offered a variety of guest appearances in television series such as The Upper Hand, The Return of Shelley, The Bill (in two different roles) and Dempsey and Makepeace, as well as in the 1989 film The Firm, alongside Gary Oldman. In 2013, Murray appeared Vikingdom as Alcuin, a wizard saved by the characters Sven (Craig Fairbrass); Brynna (Natassia Malthe); and Yang (Jon Foo).

In 2015, he made a brief return to acting, featuring in the television series Endeavour, and in the short film The Profession of Violence. His final role was as the cockney gangster Frank Bridges in the television series Conditions, co-starring along with Fenella Fielding. Originally filmed in 2019 during his brief return to acting, the appearance is set to air posthumously as the series has yet to have a release date.

== Personal life and death ==
In 1981, Murray married Shelley Wilkinson; the couple had three sons before divorcing in 1996. In 2016, he married Anong in Thailand, and they later had one daughter.

In 2017, returning to England, Murray gave up acting and became a taxi driver in order to comply with minimum income rules for citizens who wished to bring non-European spouses to England, to allow his wife and daughter to settle in England with him. They later managed to obtain a visa.

In 2018, Murray was planning to take part in a bus trip that would raise money for Demelza, a children's hospice. However, the trip was called off at the last minute as Murray revealed he was receiving treatment for chronic obstructive pulmonary disease (COPD). The trip would have included him entertaining 70 fans while travelling from Leysdown-on-Sea in Kent to Margate. Murray wanted to complete the trip at a later date.

In January 2021, Murray revealed that he was diagnosed with lung cancer. Subsequent scans also found a tumour in his liver, for which he had surgery to remove half of his liver. In May 2022, after a transcatheter arterial chemoembolization (TACE), he announced that he had been given the all-clear on his lung cancer and treatment had been successful. However, in April 2023, he revealed the lung cancer had returned and spread.

Murray died from lung cancer in Rochester, Kent, on 29 September 2025, aged 68.

== Filmography ==
=== Film ===
Year	Title	Role	Ref.
1976	The Moon Over the Alley	Ronnie Gusset	
1978	The Class of Miss MacMichael	Boysie	
1979	Scum	Dougan	
1979	Quadrophenia	Des	
1980	Breaking Glass	Injured boy	
1983	Curse of the Pink Panther	Bellboy	
1984	Haunters of the Deep	Jack	
1989	The Firm	Nunk	
2013	Vikingdom	Alcuin	
2023	The Profession of Violence	Martin C	

=== Television ===
Year	Title	Role	Notes	Ref.
1973	Centre Play	Colin	Series 1 Episode 1: "Places Where They Sing"	
1973	New Scotland Yard	Jimmy Lampard	Series 32 Episode 6: "Property, Dogs & Women"	
1973	The Terracotta Horse	David Jackson	6 episodes	
1977	Scum	Dougan	Television play	
1977, 1980	ITV Playhouse	Bobby / Telephone man	Two episodes: S9 E9 & S12 E12	
1978	Premiere	Mul		
1979	Turning Year Tales	College	"Big Jim and the Figaro Club"	
1980	Keep It in the Family	Blackie	S2.E3 "Games People Play"	
1983–1996, 2001–2003	Only Fools and Horses	Mickey Pearce	20 episodes	
1983	Down in the Valley	Valley person	Television film	
1983	Bergerac	Barman	S3.E2 "A Hole in the Bucket"	
1985	Florence Nightingale	Young Soldier	Television film	
1986	Dempsey and Makepeace	Launderette Manager	Episode: "Out of Darkness"	
1987	Pulaski	Reporter	S1 E2 "The Price of Fame"	
1988	Crossbow	Garth's Son	S2 E2 "Birthright"	
1988	The Return of Shelley	William	S7	
1990–1996	The Upper Hand	Joey		
1993	Lovejoy	Dave the Dealer	Episode: "They Call Me Midas"	
1994, 1997	The Bill	Barry Eaton / Harvey Cook	"Big Eagle Day" S10 E51; "Hunt" S13 E99	
2015	Endeavour			
2019	Conditions	Frank Bridges	13 episodes	
