= Isabel Dean =

English actress (1918–1997)

- Born: Isabel Hodgkinson; 29 May 1918; Aldridge, Staffordshire, England
- Died: 27 July 1997 (aged 79); Wandsworth, London, England
- Occupation: Actress
- Years active: 1949-1990
- Spouse(s): William Fairchild (1953-1970s; divorced); 2 children

Isabel Dean (born Isabel Hodgkinson, 29 May 1918 – 27 July 1997) was an English stage, film and television actress.

== Life and career ==
Born in Aldridge, Staffordshire, Dean studied painting at Birmingham Art School. In 1937, she joined the Cheltenham Repertory Company as a scenic artist. She was soon involved in acting with some small parts.

She appeared on stage in London in Agatha Christie's Peril at End House in 1940. Her stage appearances included The Deep Blue Sea, Breaking the Code and John Osborne's The Hotel in Amsterdam, at the Theatre Royal, Haymarket. In 1949 she appeared in The Foolish Gentlewoman at the Duchess Theatre in London.

By 1953, she was also appearing on British television in The Quatermass Experiment and over her career appeared in television series such as I, Claudius (1976) and Inspector Morse (1990). She appeared with Paul Scofield in an ITV Saturday Night Theatre production of The Hotel in Amsterdam broadcast on 14 March 1971.

Among her film appearances are roles in The Story of Gilbert and Sullivan (1953) and the film version of Inadmissible Evidence (1968).

== Personal life ==
In 1953, Dean married writer William Fairchild; the couple had two daughters, Caroline and Angela. The marriage was later dissolved.

== Radio ==
- Paul Temple and the Spencer Affair (1957)
- Paul Temple and the Geneva Mystery (1965)
- Home at seven (1966) by RC Sherriff
- The Reluctant Peer by William Douglas-Home broadcast on BBC (1967)
- Have His Carcase (1981)
- The Bird Table (1982)
- A Photograph of Lindsey Mowatt (1986) by Ellen Dryden
- Summer Attachment (1986) by Michael Sharp

== Filmography ==
=== Film ===
Year	Title	Role	Notes
1949	The Passionate Friends	Pat Stratton	
1952	The Last Page	May Harman	US title: Man Bait
1952	The Woman's Angle	Isobel Mansell	
1952	24 Hours of a Woman's Life	Miss Johnson	AKA, Affair in Monte Carlo
1953	The Story of Gilbert and Sullivan	Mrs. Gilbert	
1953	Twice Upon a Time	Miss Burke	
1955	Out of the Clouds	Mrs. Malcolm	
1955	Handcuffs, London	Doris Tedford	
1958	Davy	Helen Carstairs	
1958	Virgin Island	Mrs. Lomax	
1962	Light in the Piazza	Miss Hawtree	
1965	A High Wind in Jamaica	Alice Thornton	
1966	A Man Could Get Killed	Miss Bannister	
1968	Inadmissible Evidence	Mrs. Gamsey	
1971	To Catch a Spy	Celia	
1975	Ransom	Mrs. Palmer	AKA, The Terrorists
1976	The Bawdy Adventures of Tom Jones	Bridget	
1980	Rough Cut	Mrs. Willis	
1982	Five Days One Summer	Kate's Mother	

=== Television ===
Year	Title	Role	Notes
1948	Afterglow	Ilona	TV film
1948	Berkeley Square	Helen Pettigrew	TV film
1949	The Happiest Days of Your Life	Joyce Harper	TV film
1950	Man of Two Minds	Madrigal Grey	TV film
1950	Sunday Night Theatre	Antistia	"The Tragedy of Pompey the Great"
1951	Nocturne in Scotland	Jane Stirling	TV film
1952	The Man with the Gun	Martha Graham	TV film
1952	Sunday Night Theatre	Alison Parrilow	"The Morning Star"
1952	Another Language	Stella Hallam	TV film
1953	The Quatermass Experiment	Judith Carroon	TV series
1953	Sunday Night Theatre	Celia / Mary Drew	"As You Like It", "The Return of Peggy Atherton"
1954	Patrol Car	Mrs. Regis	"The Extra Bullet"
1955	Patrol Car	Doris Tedford	"Nell Gwynn's Tear"
1955	Sunday Night Theatre	Anne Eilers	"The Devil's General"
1955	Saber of London	Sylvia Pemberton	"Code Name: Murder"
1956	Sunday Night Theatre	Mrs. Seddon	"The Seddons"
1957	Dixon of Dock Green	Mrs. Dyce	"The Silent House"
1957	ITV Play of the Week	Rona	"Accolade"
1958	Armchair Theatre	Helène Madinier	"The Web of Lace"
1959	ITV Television Playhouse	Rose Hanbury	"A Bit of Happiness"
1959	ITV Play of the Week	Gabrielle Broadbent / Liz Heyward	"Sugar in the Morning", "The Signal"
1960	A Life of Bliss	Anne Fellows	TV series
1960	Barnaby Rudge	Mrs. Rudge	Regular role
1961	Sunday Night Play	Evelyn Hunter	"Off Centre"
1961	ITV Play of the Week	Margaret Adams	"Faraway Music"
1961	The Bun House Wedding	Miss Cushing	TV film
1961	No Hiding Place	Gretel Naunton	"Caught and Bowled"
1963	ITV Play of the Week	Elizabeth Hollis / Enid	"The Eve of St. Marks", "Three Roads to Rome"
1965	199 Park Lane	Stella Graham	Recurring role
1965	Armchair Theatre	Gwen Timwood	"A Cold Peace"
1966	Public Eye	Jean Clayton	"I Could Set It to Music"
1966	Blackmail	Lady Belmont	"A Man of Reputation"
1968	A Man of Our Times	Lydia Laing	"Someone I Knew", "Long Time Since You've Got My Breakfast"
1969	ITV Sunday Night Theatre	Peggy	"The Comic"
1970	The Wednesday Play	Mrs. Hammond	"The Italian Table"
1970	Husbands and Lovers	Eva Muller	TV miniseries
1971	Sense and Sensibility	Mrs. Dashwood	Recurring role
1971	Shadows of Fear	Gwen	"Sour Grapes"
1971	Play of the Month	Empress Alexandra	"Rasputin"
1971	ITV Saturday Night Theatre		"The Hotel in Amsterdam"
1972	The Man Outside	Hilda Frisby	"Eric"
1972	Kate	Miss Wren	"People Depend on You"
1973	The Man in the Wood	Mrs. Farren	TV film
1973	Orson Welles Great Mysteries	Christine Kaye	"Money to Burn"
1973	Play for Today	Mrs. Richardson	"Jack Point"
1974	The Aweful Mr. Goodall	Alexandra Winfield	TV series
1974	Centre Play	Fay Casaubon	"Mutinies"
1974	Dial M for Murder	Jean Browning	"Should Anyone Answer"
1975	Churchill's People	Anne, Lady Rochester	"A Bill of Mortality"
1975	Ten from the Twenties	Mrs. Garthorne	"Motherlove"
1975	Against the Crowd	Lady Peggy Frobisher	"Blind Man's Buff"
1975	Couples	Mrs. Brierley	TV series
1976	Life and Death of Penelope	Lady Cartwright	"The Affair"
1976	I, Claudius	Lollia	"Queen of Heaven"
1977	Supernatural	Charlotte Gall	"Ghost of Venice"
1977	Ripping Yarns	Lady Chiddingfold	"Murder at Moorstones Manor"
1979	The Old Crowd	Betty	TV film
1980	Company and Co	Barbara Harris	TV series
1983	The Weather in the Streets	Mrs. Curtis	TV film
1986	The Understanding	Eva	TV film
1986	A Dangerous Kind of Love	Mrs. Walker	TV film
1989	Mystery!: Campion	Donna Beatrice	"Death of a Ghost: Parts 1 & 2"
1990	Inspector Morse	Isobel Radford	"The Sins of the Fathers"
