= The Molly Wopsies =

1976 British children's television comedy drama series

The Molly Wopsies is a British children's comedy drama by Thames Television which, following a pilot in 1974, ran for six episodes in 1976. The story was about the adventures in a wartime Oxfordshire village of a group of children, including two evacuees, which often involved run-ins with the village policeman.

== Cast ==
- Phil Daniels as Alan Musgrove
- Ben Forster as Dinkey Dunkley
- Aubrey Morris as PC Berry
- Julie Taylor as Dottie Minton
- Matthew Whiteman as Norman Yates
