= Funny Farm (Play for Today) =

- Play for Today episode
- Ad featuring Tim Preece
- Episode no.: Series 5 Episode 13
- Directed by: Alan Clarke
- Written by: Roy Minton
- Original air date: 27 February 1975

Episode chronology
← Previous "Sunset Across The Bay"	Next → "Goodbye"

"Funny Farm" is the 13th episode of fifth season of the British BBC anthology TV series Play for Today. The episode was a television play that was originally broadcast on 27 February 1975. "Funny Farm" was written by Roy Minton, directed by Alan Clarke, produced by Mark Shivas, and starred Tim Preece.

Alan Wellbeck (Tim Preece) is a nurse in a mental hospital. His day-to-day struggles with personal feelings and troubled patients provide humour and pathos against the backdrop of a public institution.

== Cast ==
- Tim Preece as Alan Welbeck
- Allan Surtees as Arthur Rothwell
- Bernard Severn as Ted Spinner
- Michael Bilton as Sidney Charlton
- Kenneth Scott as Jonathan
- John Locke as Jeff West
- Gordon Christie as Jack
- Anthony Langdon as Les Dewhurst
- Wally Thomas as Mr. Chadd
- Donald Bisset as Mr. Scully
- Terence Davies as Walter
- Arnold Diamond as James Ball
- Francis Mortimer as Graham
- Helena McCarthy as Joyce
- Michael Percival as John
- Dorothy Frere as Edna Ball
- Chris Sanders as Bill Spence
- Patricia Moore as Miss Taylor
- John Cross
