= Botched (film) =

2007 film

- Poster art
- Directed by: Kit Ryan
- Written by: Raymond Friel; Derek Boyle; Eamon Friel
- Produced by: Alan Balladur; Thomas Fischer; Steve Richards; Terence Ryan; Ken Tuohy
- Starring: Stephen Dorff; Jaime Murray; Sean Pertwee; Jamie Foreman; Geoff Bell
- Cinematography: Bryan Loftus
- Edited by: Jeremy Gibbs
- Music by: Tom Green
- Production companies: Dark Castle Entertainment; ApolloProMovie & Co. 1. Filmproduktion; Arcade Films; Barraboy Films; Madigan Film Productions; Opix Films; Zinc Entertainment Inc.
- Distributed by: Optimum Releasing (UK); Warner Bros. Home Entertainment (US)
- Release dates: 30 July 2007 (Munich Fantasy Filmfest); 18 April 2008 (Ireland)
- Running time: 91 minutes
- Countries: Australia; United Kingdom; Germany; Ireland; United States
- Language: English

Botched is a 2007 comedy horror film directed by Kit Ryan and starring Stephen Dorff. It is an international co-production between Australia, the United Kingdom, Germany, Ireland, and the United States. The film stars Dorff alongside Jaime Murray, Sean Pertwee, Jamie Foreman and Geoff Bell in supporting roles.

The plot follows Ritchie (Dorff) and his two Russian accomplices as they infiltrate the penthouse, only for their plan to spiral out of control. After taking several hostages, they quickly discover that the heirloom is protected by a sadistic serial killer, who begins eliminating both criminals and hostages in gruesome fashion.

Botched premiered at the Munich Fantasy Filmfest on July 30, 2007, followed by a theatrical release on April 18, 2008.

== Plot ==
Richie Donovan, a professional thief, is deeply indebted to his boss, Groznyi, for being smuggled into the U.S. as a child. After a botched diamond heist involving two car accidents, Richie is given one final opportunity to clear his debt. He travels to Moscow to steal a priceless antique cross from a penthouse apartment. Richie and his two Russian accomplices, Peter and Yuri, successfully retrieve the cross, but their escape is foiled when the elevator becomes stuck on the unfinished 13th floor. Believing they are trapped by the police, they take the other passengers hostage to negotiate their way out. However, when the elevator reaches the ground floor, one of the hostages is found beheaded, signaling that something far more sinister is at play.

As the group begins to unravel, the hostages split into two factions. Sonya, Helena, and Katerina form a Christian sect, joined by Yuri, while the others—Dmitry, Anna, and security guard Boris—form a second group. Chaos ensues when the Christian group seizes firearms, injuring Peter, and Sonya takes Yuri to a secret chamber where a wild, armored man named Alex awaits to sacrifice him. Though Yuri escapes, he is killed by one of Alex's elaborate traps, accompanied by disco music and flashing lights. In the ensuing melee, Katerina is killed, allowing Richie and the remaining hostages to flee.

Richie and the survivors discover Alex's lair, complete with security cameras monitoring their every move. They learn that Alex is Sonya's twin brother, and both believe they are descendants of Ivan the Terrible. Richie and Anna decide to pursue Alex, while Boris and Dmitry attempt to set traps for him. However, their traps fail miserably, and Alex begins hunting them down. Dmitry is easily caught, and Boris is tricked into deploying a faulty trap, resulting in the loss of his hand. Despite cauterizing the wound, Boris is further incapacitated by a serum injected into him, restricting his facial movements.

Meanwhile, Alex retrieves the cross and prepares to sacrifice Peter, who miraculously survived his injuries. In a final confrontation, Richie, Boris, and Peter all attack Alex. Though Alex easily kills Peter, Richie manages to impale Alex on his own disco spikes and sets him on fire, recovering the cross in the process. As they attempt to leave, Sonya tries to strangle Richie, but Anna stabs her with a nail file, saving Richie's life.

Outside, Richie and Anna are greeted by Groznyi, who rewards Richie handsomely for the job. However, Richie, now enraged by the revelation that Groznyi is Sonya and Alex's brother, vows never to work for him again. Groznyi ominously suggests that Richie will return, but Richie and Anna depart for Los Angeles, leaving the chaos behind.

== Cast ==
- David Heap as Auctioneer
- Alan Smyth as Hugo
- Stephen Dorff as Ritchie Donovan
- Sean Pertwee as Mr. Groznyi
- Igor Chistol as Thug 1
- Greg Jeloudov as Thug 2
- Jamie Foreman as Peter
- Russell Smith as Yuri
- Bronagh Gallagher as Sonya
- Norma Sheahan as Helena
- Gene Rooney as Katerina
- Jaime Murray as Anna
- Hugh O'Conor as Dmitry
- Geoff Bell as Boris
- Zak Maguire as Alex
- Edward Baker-Duly as Killer (credited as Edward Duly Baker)
- Luke Hayden as Security Guard

== Reception ==
The film holds an approval rating of 25% on Rotten Tomatoes, based on 8 reviews, with an average rating of 4.2/10.

Bloody Good Horror praised Botched for its successful mix of slapstick humor and graphic violence, with Stephen Dorff's performance receiving particular commendation. The review noted some issues with the film's pacing and reliance on absurd plot twists but concluded that it remains an entertaining choice for fans of horror-comedy, describing it as "a fun and gory romp filled with laughs and mayhem." Phelim O'Neill of The Guardian described Botched as a "chaotic horror-comedy" that combines slapstick humor with violent gore. While O'Neill noted that the humor is often exaggerated, he acknowledged the film's ability to deliver absurd and darkly comedic moments. Dorff's performance was highlighted as a key strength, although the film's uneven tone and pacing were criticized. O'Neill concluded that while Botched may not appeal to all audiences, it offers an unpredictable and entertaining ride for those seeking a mix of laughs and bloodshed.

The film has garnered positive feedback from genre-specific outlets such as Shock Till You Drop and Dread Central, with the latter praising the movie for "[treating] its audience with intelligence."

=== Awards ===
- Best Feature Film at the 2007 New York City Horror Film Festival
- Best Actor for Stephen Dorff at the 2007 New York City Horror Film Festival
