= Geoff Bell (actor) =

English actor

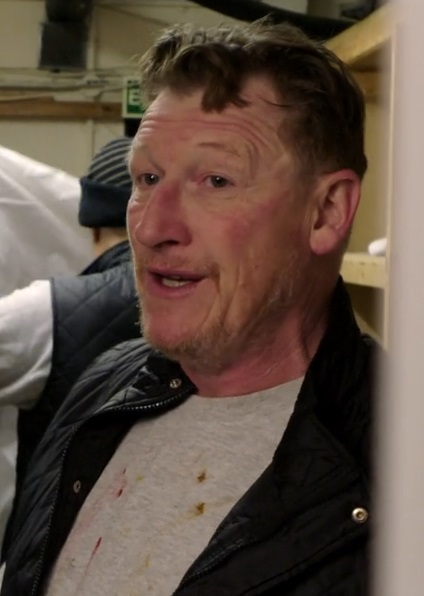
- Bell in Poison Arrows (2022)
- Born: London, England
- Occupation: Actor
- Years active: 1993–present

Geoff Bell is an English actor. Known for his "hard-man" and gangster roles, he has appeared in many films and TV shows including Mike Bassett: England Manager (2001), Mean Machine (2001), The Business (2005), Green Street (2005), Stardust (2007), RocknRolla (2008), Top Boy (2011), Brighton Rock (2010), Big Fat Gypsy Gangster (2011), War Horse (2011), Rogue One (2016), The End of the F***ing World (2017), His Dark Materials (2019), Once Upon a Time in London (2022), Poison Arrows (2022), Kindling (2023), Rise of the Footsoldier: Vengeance (2023), MobLand (2025), King and Conqueror (2025) and The Thursday Murder Club (2025).

== Early life and education ==
Geoff Bell was born in Peckham, London, and had a tough upbringing in the working-class brought up in the flats of Lambeth Walk. His first experience in the entertainment industry was at the age of ten, entering caravan holiday talent competitions.

Bell raised a family, whilst running a cleaning business, until age 28. He decided to pursue acting at Morley College in Westminster, graduating at the age of 30.

== Career ==
In 2001, Bell played the captain of England's football team, Gary Wackett, known as Wacko, an extremely violent centre back, a parody of Stuart Pearce and Vinnie Jones, in the film Mike Bassett: England Manager. He appeared in Girl with a Pearl Earring (2003), Stardust (2007), The Long Firm (2004), Making Waves (2004), The Business (2005), and RocknRolla (2008). Another of his most notable roles was playing Tommy Hatcher, rival of the main characters in the film Green Street (2005).

In 2008, Bell starred in the UK film Freebird, directed by Jon Ivay. Appearing alongside Gary Stretch and Phil Daniels, the film followed three bikers across a drug fuelled ride in the Welsh countryside. In 2009, he appeared in the British film Tormented, as the sports teacher, alongside Alex Pettyfer, April Pearson and Calvin Dean. He has appeared in a supporting role in Wild Target as Dixon's assistant, alongside Rupert Grint, Bill Nighy and Martin Freeman. In spring 2010 Bell appeared in Five Daughters as DC Roy Lambert in the drama about the five prostitutes murdered in Ipswich, Suffolk.

In 2011, he starred as horse keeper Sergeant Sam Perkins of the British Army, In War Horse. The same year, he appeared in Channel 4's four part drama series Top Boy. In 2012, he played John Morgan in Comes a Bright Day.

In 2019, Bell played Jack Verhoeven in the television adaptation of the novel series His Dark Materials by Philip Pullman. In 2020, Bell appeared in the Louis Tomlinson music video for "Don't Let It Break Your Heart". in 2022, he played the lead role in the darts Mockumentary ''Poison Arrows (2022), alongside former World BDO darts champion Martin Adams, presenter Ray Stubbs, and promoter Barry Hearn.

In 2025, he stars as Richie Stevenson, leader of south London gang 'the Stevensons', a rival to the shows protagonist criminals 'the Harrigans', led by Pierce Brosnan's Conrad Harrigan in the Paramount+ London gangster series MobLand (2025), directed by Guy Ritchie; Part of a cast which also includes Tom Hardy, Dame Helen Mirren, Paddy Considine, and Joanne Froggatt.

== Other activities ==
Bell returned to the drama education environment to teach acting at The Flats Film School in Deal in 2012.

== Personal life ==
Bell played for charity in the Premier League All Stars football in 2008, alongside fellow actors Danny Dyer, and Tamer Hassan. Bell is a supporter of Millwall F.C.

== Filmography ==
Key
†	Denotes films that have not yet been released

=== Film ===
Year	Title	Role	Notes
2001	Mike Bassett: England Manager	Gary Wackett	
2001	Mean Machine	Ratchett	
2002	AKA	Brian Page	
2003	Oh Marbella!	Stan	
2003	I'll Sleep When I'm Dead	Arnie Ryan	
2003	Girl with a Pearl Earring	Paul The Butcher	
2005	Green Street	Tommy Hatcher	
2005	The Business	Sammy	
2006	Scoop	Strombel's Co-Worker	
2007	Love Me Still	Bobby	
2007	Stardust	Receptionist	
2007	Botched	Boris	
2007	The Seeker: The Dark Is Rising	Security Guard #1	
2008	Freebird	Tyg	
2008	Daylight Robbery	Alex	
2008	RocknRolla	Fred the Head	
2009	Night Train	Detective	
2009	Tormented	Games Teacher	
2009	Solomon Kane	Beard	
2010	The Heavy	Frank Marshall	
2010	The Reeds	Croker	
2010	Wild Target	Fabian	
2010	Route Irish	Alex Walker	
2010	Brighton Rock	Kite	
2011	Mercenaries	Vladko	
2011	Big Fat Gypsy Gangster	Geoff	
2011	War Horse	Sgt. Sam Perkins	
2012	Comes a Bright Day	Mr. Morgan	
2012	Boys on Film 8: Cruel Britannia	Frank	
2012	Storage 24	Bob	
2012	Comedown	The Tenant	
2013	Dementamania	David Snodgrass	
2014	C.O.O.L.I.O. Time Travel Gangster	Chaney	
2014	Kingsman: The Secret Service	Dean	
2015	North v South	Bill Vincent	
2015	Suffragette	Norman Taylor	
2016	Mine	Mike's Father	
2016	Rogue One	2nd Lieutenant Frobb	
2017	King Arthur: Legend of the Sword	Mischief John	
2017	The Man with the Iron Heart	Müller	
2019	Once Upon a Time in London	Darky Mulley	
2020	The Rhythm Section	Green	
2022	Poison Arrows	Rocky Goldfingers	
2023	Kindling	Sid's Dad	
2023	Rise of the Footsoldier: Vengeance	Jonny Knight	
2025	Marching Powder	Ron	
2025	The Thursday Murder Club	Tony Curran	

=== Television ===
Year	Title	Role	Notes
1993	The Tooting Lions	Bouncer	Television film
1996	Eastenders	Security Guard	2 episodes
1996	London's Burning	Area Rep	Episode #9.8
1996–2002	The Bill	Joe Nash / Robbie Stafford / Tucker	3 episodes
2003	Secret History	Kenneth Noye	Episode: "Brinks Mat: The Greatest Heist – Part 2"
2004	Making Waves	Buffer	Episode #1.1
2004	The Long Firm	Jock McClusky	4 episodes
2006	The Virgin Queen	Dentist	2 episodes
2006	Saxondale	Crusty	Episode: "Pigeons"
2010	Five Daughters	Supt Roy Lambert	2 episodes
2011	Top Boy	Bobby Raikes	4 episodes
2012	Treasure Island	Israel Hands	2 episodes
2012	Above Suspicion	Harry James	3 episodes
2012	Ripper Street	Joseph Smeaton	Episode: "I Need Light"
2013	Power to the People	Terry	Episode: "Ops Populus"
2013	Southcliffe	Uncle Alan	3 episodes
2013	Whitechapel	Gerard Watts	2 episodes
2014	DCI Banks	Jimmy Chivers	2 episodes
2014	The Smoke	Maybrick	Episode #1.3
2014	Power to the People	Terry	Television film
2014	The Great Fire	Wilson	4 episodes
2015	Cradle to Grave	Woody	Episode #1.5
2016	The Hollow Crown	Murderer I	Episode: "Richard III"
2016	The Level	Duncan Elliot	5 episodes
2017	Tin Star	Malcolm	Episode: "Fortunate Boy"
2017	The End of the F***ing World	Martin	Episode #1.2
2019	Hatton Garden	Carl Wood	3 episodes
2019	His Dark Materials	Jack Verhoeven	4 episodes
2020	Silent Witness	Brian Collyer	2 episodes
2020	The Great	General Ekberg	Episode: "Meatballs at the Dacha"
2020	Absentia	Colin Dawkins	10 episodes
2022	The Curse	Detective Saunders	5 episodes
2022	Whitstable Pearl	Bill Tate	2 episodes
2023	Death in Paradise	Gerry Stableforth	Episode: "Christmas Special"
2024	Mr. Bigstuff	Steve	Episode: "Episode 2"
2025	MobLand	Richie Stevenson	Main cast; 10 episodes
2025	King & Conqueror	Godwin	
