= Alan Clarke =

English director (1935–1990)

- Born: 28 October 1935; Wallasey, Cheshire, England
- Died: 24 July 1990 (aged 54); London, England
- Occupations: Director, producer, writer
- Children: 2 (including Gabriel)

Alan John Clarke (28 October 1935 – 24 July 1990) was an English television and film director, producer and writer.

== Life and career ==
Clarke was born on 28 October 1935, in Wallasey.

Most of Clarke's output was for television rather than cinema, including work for the famous play strands The Wednesday Play and Play for Today. His subject matter tended towards social realism, with deprived or oppressed communities as a frequent setting.

As Dave Rolinson's book details, between 1962 and 1966 Clarke directed several plays at The Questors Theatre in Ealing, London. Between 1967 and 1969, he directed various ITV productions including plays by Alun Owen (Shelter, George's Room, Stella, Thief, Gareth), Edna O'Brien (Which of These Two Ladies Is He Married To? and Nothing's Ever Over) and Roy Minton (The Gentleman Caller, Goodnight Albert, Stand By Your Screen). He also worked on the series The Informer, The Gold Robbers and A Man of Our Times (but not, as Sight and Sound once claimed, Big Breadwinner Hog).

Clarke continued to work for ITV through the 1970s, but during the decade made much of his work for the BBC. This included pieces for The Wednesday Play (Sovereign's Company 1970), Play for Today and Play of the Month (The Love-Girl and the Innocent, 1973, and Danton's Death, 1978). Distinctive work for these strands included further plays by Minton including Funny Farm (1975) and Scum (further details below), but also Sovereign's Company by Don Shaw, The Hallelujah Handshake by Colin Welland (both 1970) and Penda's Fen by David Rudkin (1974). He also made To Encourage the Others (1972), a powerful drama-documentary about the Derek Bentley case (the case that was later dramatised in Peter Medak's 1991 film Let Him Have It), and several documentaries, including Vodka Cola (1981) on multinational corporations. Clarke's other work in the mid-to-late 1970s included the initially unreleased documentary Bukovsky about the Soviet dissident and defector Vladimir Bukovsky and a companion Play For Today follow-up titled Nina (1978), which starred Jack Shepherd and Eleanor Bron.

A number of his works achieved notoriety and widespread criticism from the conservative end of the political spectrum, including Scum (1977), dealing with the subject of borstals (youth prisons), which was banned by the BBC, and subsequently remade by Clarke as a feature film released in 1979 (the original television version was only screened after his death). Clarke directed the television play Made in Britain (1982), starring Tim Roth (in his television debut) as a racist skinhead and his negative relationship with authorities and racial minorities, from a screenplay by David Leland. The feature film Rita, Sue and Bob Too (1987), was adapted by the working-class writer Andrea Dunbar from her stage work. The 1975 BBC play Diane, starring Janine Duvitski, which dealt with an incestuous relationship between a father and daughter was controversially received by the tabloid press.

Clarke's work in the 1980s was fiercely stark and political, including the David Leland plays Beloved Enemy (1981) on multinational corporations and Psy-Warriors (1981) on military interrogation. Clarke also directed David Bowie in Baal (1982) for the BBC, part of Clarke's interest in Bertolt Brecht. His film work became more sparse, culminating in Contact (1985) on the British military presence in Northern Ireland, Billy the Kid and the Green Baize Vampire (1985), Road (1987), and Elephant (1989).

Many of the films that Clarke directed from this period are often seen as bleak and lacking redemptive qualities – the 1986 BBC film Christine dealt with teenage drug addiction whilst Road featured a cast of characters in the depressed estates of Northern England. Elephant, lasting only 37 minutes, dealt with 'the troubles' in Northern Ireland by featuring a series of shootings with no narrative and minimal dialogue; all were based on accounts of actual sectarian killings that had taken place in Belfast. The film took its title from Bernard MacLaverty's description of the troubles as "the elephant in our living room" – a reference to the collective denial of the underlying social problems of Northern Ireland. His final production of Al Hunter's The Firm (1989), covered football hooliganism through the lead character played by Gary Oldman, but also explored the politics of Thatcher's Britain. Like several of Clarke's previous films, the screening of The Firm as part of BBC 2's Screen Two series was controversial and criticised by some of the British Press as being too violent and sexually explicit. Like Christine, Road and Elephant, The Firm was also notable for Clarke's use of the steadicam, partly inspired by its earlier use in films by Stanley Kubrick like The Shining.

In 1990, Clarke travelled to America in order to pursue the idea of developing a US-based career in filmmaking. Prior to his death he was making initial plans to film Assassination On Embassy Row, later retitled An American Murder, about the assassination of Orlando Letelier filmed from the assassin's point-of-view. The film never came to fruition, partly due to a lack of interest from the major US film studios and Clarke's declining health. Another project, a script by David Yallop entitled In God's Name, also went unmade as Clarke began radiotherapy for cancer which by that time had spread from his lungs to his spine.

In 1991, a documentary on him, Director Alan Clarke by Corin Campbell-Hill, aired on British TV. In 2016, all of Clarke's surviving work for the BBC was released in a two-part DVD/Blu-Ray collection titled Dissent & Disruption: Alan Clarke at the BBC. This set included the first official release of the 1976 documentary Bukovsky alongside extensive interviews with many of Clarke's collaborators and contemporaries.

Clarke inspired Nick Love to direct films founded upon social realism. Love stated that watching Clarke's The Firm had motivated him to become a filmmaker.

== Personal life ==
Clarke died on 24 July 1990, aged 54, in London, after suffering from lung cancer.

Clarke's son is Gabriel Clarke, a sports journalist with ITV. His daughter is Molly Clarke.

== Filmography ==
=== Television plays ===
Broadcast strand/series in brackets, otherwise screened as a standalone play.

- Shelter (Half-Hour Story, Rediffusion 1967)
- A Man Inside (Half-Hour Story, Rediffusion 1967)
- The Gentleman Caller (Half-Hour Story, Rediffusion 1967)
- Which of these Two Lades is He Married To? (Half-Hour Story, Rediffusion 1967)
- George's Room (Half-Hour Story, Rediffusion 1967)
- Sleeping Dogs Lie (episode of The Informer, Rediffusion 1967)
- Sally Go Round the Moon (episode of A Man of Our Times, Rediffusion 1968)
- Goodnight Albert (Half-Hour Story, Rediffusion 1968)
- Got Yourself Sorted Out At All? (episode of A Man of Our Times, Rediffusion 1968)
- Never Mind How We Got Here - Where Are We? (episode of A Man of Our Times, Rediffusion 1968)
- Stella (Half-Hour Story, Rediffusion 1968)
- The Fifty-Seventh Saturday (Half-Hour Story, Rediffusion 1968)
- Nothing's Ever Over (Half-Hour Story, Rediffusion 1968)
- Thief (Half-Hour Story, Rediffusion 1968)
- Stand By Your Screen (Company of Five, LWT 1968)
- Gareth (Company of Five, LWT 1968)
- The Piano Tuner (Saturday Night Theatre, Kestrel/LWT 1969)
- The Arrangement (episode of The Gold Robbers, LWT 1969)
- The Ladies: Joan/Doreen (two plays for Plays of Today, BBC Two 1969)
- The Last Train Through Harecastle Tunnel (The Wednesday Play, BBC One 1969)
- The Comic (Saturday Night Theatre, Kestrel/LWT 1969)
- Sovereign's Company (The Wednesday Play, BBC One 1970)
- I Can't See My Little Willie (Play for Today, BBC One 1970)
- The Hallelujah Handshake (Play for Today, BBC One 1970)
- Everybody Say Cheese (Play for Today, BBC One 1971)
- Under the Age (Thirty-Minute Theatre, BBC Two 1972)
- Horace (BBC Two, 1972)
- To Encourage the Others (BBC Two, 1972)
- A Life is for Ever (Play for Today, BBC One 1972)
- Horatio Bottomley (The Edwardians, BBC Two 1972)
- Achilles Heel (LWT, 1973)
- Man Above Men (Play for Today, BBC One 1973)
- The Love Girl and the Innocent (Play of the Month, BBC One 1973)
- Penda's Fen (Play for Today, BBC One 1974)
- A Follower for Emily (Play for Today, BBC One 1974)
- Funny Farm (Play for Today, BBC One 1975)
- Diane (BBC Two, 1975)
- Fast Hands (Plays for Britain, Thames 1976)
- Scum (made for Play for Today, BBC One 1977, but not transmitted until 1991 on BBC Two)
- Danton's Death (Play of the Month, BBC One 1978)
- Nina (Play for Today, BBC One 1978)
- Beloved Enemy (Play for Today, BBC One 1981)
- Psy-Warriors (Play for Today, BBC One 1981)
- David Bowie in Baal (BBC One, 1982)
- Made in Britain (Tales Out of School, Central 1982)
- Stars of the Roller State Disco (BBC 1984)
- Contact (Screen Two, BBC Two 1985)
- Christine (ScreenPlay, BBC Two 1987)
- Road (ScreenPlay, BBC Two 1987)
- Elephant (BBC Two 1989)
- The Firm (Screen Two, BBC Two 1989)

=== Films ===
- Scum (1979)
- Billy the Kid and the Green Baize Vampire (1985)
- Rita, Sue and Bob Too (1987)

=== Documentaries ===
- Bukovsky (1977)
- Vodka Cola (1980)
- British Desk (1984)

== Cultural influences ==
Musician Annie Locke was a close friend of Clarke for many years, and they worked together on The Love-Girl and the Innocent. After Clarke's death, she wrote a suite of pieces in his memory, entitled "A Man Called Alan".

Clarke inspired a generation of actors, writers and directors, including Paul Greengrass, Stephen Frears, Tim Roth, Ray Winstone, Gary Oldman, Danny Brocklehurst and Iain MacDonald. Filmmakers Harmony Korine and Joel Potrykus have cited Clarke as a major influence on their work. As documented in the series The Story of Film by Mark Cousins, the 2003 movie Elephant by Gus Van Sant about the Columbine High School Massacre was named after and influenced by Clarke's earlier work of the same title, especially by Clarke's penchant for long take tracking shots, often following one or more characters from the rear as they move through space. James Marsh's 2012 film Shadow Dancer makes specific homage to the walking scenes in 1987 television play Christine.

Critic David Thomson has observed, "No one has ever grasped the central metaphor of cramped existence in walking as well as Alan Clarke."
