= Billy the Kid and the Green Baize Vampire =

1985 film by Alan John Clarke

- DVD cover
- Directed by: Alan Clarke
- Written by: Trevor Preston
- Produced by: Simon Mallin
- Starring: Phil Daniels; Bruce Payne; Alun Armstrong; Don Henderson; Louise Gold
- Cinematography: Clive Tickner
- Edited by: Stephen Singleton
- Music by: George Fenton
- Distributed by: ITC Entertainment
- Release date: 9 May 1986 (UK)
- Running time: 95 minutes
- Country: United Kingdom
- Language: English
- Budget: £2.7 million

Billy the Kid and the Green Baize Vampire is a 1985 British independent musical fantasy horror comedy-drama sports film starring Phil Daniels and Alun Armstrong. The film was directed by Alan Clarke and written by Trevor Preston. The BFI has described it as "undoubtedly the only vampire snooker musical in cinema history". The film is loosely based on the rivalry between the snooker players Ray Reardon and Jimmy White.

== Plot ==
Billy the Kid is a young, up-and-coming snooker player. His manager, T.O. (The One), a compulsive gambler, falls into debt with psychopathic loanshark the Wednesday Man, who offers to cancel T.O's debt if he can arrange a 17-frame grudge snooker match between Billy and the reigning world champion Maxwell Randall (popularly known as the Green Baize Vampire).

To ensure that both players will agree to the match, T.O hires a journalist, Miss Sullivan, to stir up trouble between them. She interviews Billy and the Vampire separately, asks them leading questions intended to elicit angry responses and provoke enmity, then prints the results. The match is set.

Unknown to T.O., the Wednesday Man has hidden motives regarding the match. The sinister loanshark has engineered a clause in the game's legal documentation to the effect that the loser will agree to never play professional snooker again. Though the Vampire is close to retirement, Billy is young, and such a clause—if he loses—would greatly disadvantage him. T.O. only agrees when the Wednesday Man suggests that the Vampire will "not be at his best"; a clear insinuation that he will be bribed, or threatened. It is only later that T.O. discovers that this is a lie and that the Wednesday Man is plotting with the Vampire, hates both him and Billy, and wishes to see them suffer.

The match goes very badly for Billy, but when T.O. finally confesses, during a break, of his underhand dealings with the Wednesday Man (and the Vampire himself) he manages to pull himself together and eventually win the match.

== Cast ==
- Phil Daniels as Billy the Kid (snooker player)
- Bruce Payne as T.O. ('The One', Billy's manager)
- Richard Ridings as Egypt (Billy's minder)
- Alun Armstrong as Maxwell Randall (the Vampire)
- Don Henderson as The Wednesday Man (loanshark)
- Louise Gold as Miss Sullivan (reporter)
- Zoot Money as Supersonic Sam (cafe owner)
- Eve Ferret as Mrs Randall (the Vampire's wife)
- Neil McCaul as Big Jack Jay (Snooker compere)
- Johnny Dennis as Referee
- Kevin Lloyd as unnamed part
- Caroline Quentin as unnamed part

== Songs ==
- "Green Stamps" – sung by Billy
- "Poker Song" – T.O.
- "Supersonic Sam's Cosmic Cafe" – Billy and the Cafe denizens
- "I Bite Back" – the Vampire
- "I'm the One" – T.O.
- "BtKatGBV (Practice Practice Practice)" – Miss Sullivan
- "Snooker (So Much More Than Just a Game)" – Big Jack Jay
- "Kid to Break" – Billy and the cast
- "Quack Quack" – the match crowd
- "It's the Fame Game" – Billy and the cast
- "White Lines Black Cadillac" – T.O.

== Production ==
The film was produced by Zenith Productions and released in the UK by ITC Entertainment.

=== Casting ===
The casting of Phil Daniels and Alun Armstrong was confirmed in late February and early March 1985.

=== Filming ===
Although the original plan was for the film to be an all location street musical, ultimately it was filmed completely at Twickenham Studios in London. Filming began in March 1985.

== Release ==
It was screened at the American Film Market in 1986 along with Robbery Under Arms and Blind Alley.

== Reception ==
Film critic Geoff Andrew, has stated that the film is arguably Alan Clarke's "best". Critic Michael Brooke stated that 'a critical and commercial failure that has since picked up a modest cult following, Billy the Kid and the Green Baize Vampire undoubtedly deserves plaudits for sheer originality: for all its many faults, it was the first and will almost certainly remain the only vampire snooker musical ever made.' Brooke also commented that 'the cast gave it their all' with 'Phil Daniels (then approaching the end of his surprisingly short-lived career as a major big-screen star) and Alun Armstrong' fleshing 'out the title characters with memorable vigour' and Bruce Payne giving the "stand out performance" in the film. In Graeme Clark's view, the film is 'worth tracking down for its downright peculiarity'.

The Radio Times gave the film a score of 3 stars out of 5. Nicolas Bonnes gave the film the same score. Bonnes noted that the film is not a remake of the 1966 horror western film Billy the Kid Versus Dracula, rather it is given a contemporary setting in which director Alan Clarke opposes two very distinct worlds: the wealthy world whose representative is the vampire and the world of destitute and penniless proletarians, whose representative is Billy. In his view, 'Clarke takes the opportunity to settle accounts with' the 'increasingly unequal society' of Thatcherite Britain. Kevin Sturton also noted the 'political element' of the film 'with Maxwell representing the establishment and Billy the underclass'. Beth Carroll noted that the film was not a financial success and lacked a clear audience.

John Pym has stated that the film is 'so utterly crazed in conception and so defiantly weird in execution that one can't help feeling a sneaking something for it'. Marjorie Bilbow stated that Alan Clarke succeeded in 'establishing an ambience of seedy villainy: but the sardonic humour which enlivens the conflict between the snooker Establishment of Maxwell and his well-heeled cohorts and the upcoming Flash Harry of Billy gets lost in the cacophony of a book and lyrics too demandingly intelligent for instant acceptance'.
