= Kit Ryan =

Film director and screenwriter

Kit Ryan is a film director and screenwriter.

== Filmography ==
- Botched (2007)
- Dementamania (2013)
- Property of the State (2017)
