= Dementamania =

- Directed by: Kit Ryan
- Written by: Anis Shlewet
- Produced by: James T. Ryan; Anis Shlewet
- Starring: Sam Robertson; Kal Penn; Vincent Regan; Geoff Bell
- Cinematography: Gerry Lively
- Edited by: Jeremy Gibbs
- Music by: Guy Farley
- Production companies: Gloucester Place Films; Green Screen Productions; International Pictures Three; Opix Films; Premiere Picture; Rash; Ronin Pictures
- Distributed by: Parkgate Entertainment; Stealth Media Group
- Release date: 23 August 2013 (FrightFest)
- Running time: 85 minutes
- Country: United Kingdom
- Language: English

Dementamania, also stylised as DementaMania, is a 2013 British horror film that was directed by Kit Ryan. The film had its world premiere on 23 August 2013 at the London FrightFest Film Festival and stars Sam Robertson as a software analyst that finds himself possibly going mad after receiving an insect bite.

== Synopsis ==
On the morning of Friday the 13th, 2013 software analyst Edward Arkham (Sam Robertson) is bitten by a hornet, marking the beginning of a disastrous day. Several of his bosses and co-workers make mention to Edward leaving the department and possibly losing his job and to make matters worse, the insect bite is beginning to turn into a terrible rash. Throughout all of this Edward seems to be followed by the strange Nicholas LeMarchand (Vincent Regan), who appears to know everything that Edward is feeling or thinking.

== Cast ==
- Sam Robertson as Edward Arkham
- Kal Penn as Christian Van Burden
- Vincent Regan as Nicholas Lemarchand
- Geoff Bell as David Snodgrass
- John Thomson as Mikey Moran
- Richard Ashton as Bouncer
- Richard Crehan as Junior
- Holly Weston as Laura Harrington
- Matt Healy as William Hawkes
- Rebecca Reaney as Carrie

== Reception ==
Critical reception for Dementamania has been mixed. Twitch Film and Ain't It Cool News both wrote mostly positive reviews for the film, and Twitch Film wrote that it was "an interesting look at the mundane-ness of life, and how we might be the ones to make it mundane, about how our imaginations can sometimes get the better of us, and how acting out might not always be the best option." Dread Central and Grolsch Film Works both wrote more critical reviews for the movie, and Dread Central praised Robertson's acting while criticizing the film's pacing and commenting that it was overly predictable.
