= Jon Ivay =

English writer, director, actor, and producer (born 1966)

Jon Ivay (born 1966) is an English writer, director, actor, and producer.

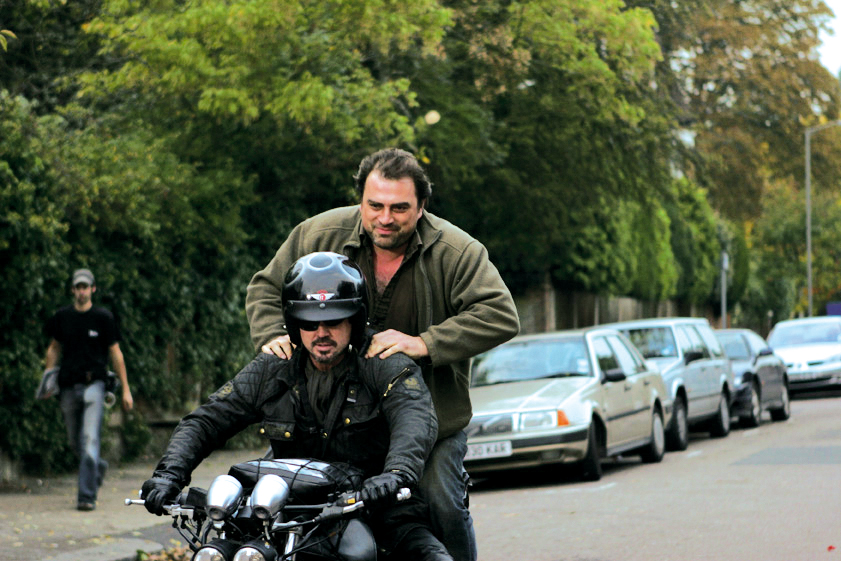
Jon rides a motorcycle whilst on the set of Freebird (film).

== Early years ==
Ivay was born on the Isle of Portland, Dorset, England, and grew up near the town of Blandford Forum. He studied at the Oxford School of Drama and the Webber Douglas Academy of Dramatic Art in London.

== Career ==
Early in his career, Ivay formed a theatrical production company (ITF Productions Ltd) with two friends. Over a nine-year period they produced over thirty-five national touring productions working with some of Britain's best known theatres and promising directors. Whilst with ITF, he wrote the stage plays Inside the Firm (Edinburgh Festival and the Queens theatre Hornchurch) which told the story of Tony Lambrianou's involvement with the Kray Twins and Freebird (Bristol Old Vic, Cockpit London, Pleasance - Edinburgh Festival and tour) a motorcycle based comedy.

After leaving ITF, Ivay adapted and directed the screen version of Freebird. Working with the producers and production team from the British movies Layer Cake and Kick-Ass. Freebird was shot in London, Hay-on- Wye, Brecon Wales and Los Angeles. The film starred Phil Daniels, Gary Stretch and Geoff Bell. Supporting cast included Peter Bowles, Arthur Brown (The Crazy World of Arthur Brown), Laila Rouass and Caroline Hunnisett. The film was released in cinemas across the UK in spring 2008. The film's London premiere was at the Empire, Leicester Square. Freebird's American premiere was at the Sunset 5 Movie Theater on Sunset Boulevard Los Angeles on 27 October 2008.

The film was an entry at the 2009 Academy Awards. In 2009 Freebird was screened at the Berlin and Cannes film festivals. The film was re-released on DVD in 2011 by Anchor Bay Entertainment as a Triple Bill along with Withnail and I and The Long Good Friday under the heading - The Brit Collection. The original soundtrack for the film was produced by Youth who also produced Urban Hymns by The Verve amongst many other notable British and world artists including Embrace, The Prodigy, Paul McCartney, Primal Scream, JAMES and The Cult. The soundtrack from the film was released in Spring 2010.

Ivay's latest project 'Delorean' tells the story of John Deloreans struggle to build the DeLorean Sports car in Belfast between 1978 and 1982. The play premiered at the Assembly rooms as part of the 2017 Edinburgh Festival Fringe. It gained five-star ratings from British Theatre Guide and the Edinburgh Reporter; and four-star ratings from the Daily/Sunday Mail, Daily Record and Pocketsize Theatre. The Telegraph rated it as one of the ten best shows at that year's festival. A further production is being planned as a National Tour.

As an actor, he has appeared many times on stage. His film and television credits include The Gigolos, Telstar and Freebird, BBC Drama Spooks, The Bill, The Vet and The 10 Percenters.

== Personal life ==
Ivay is married to the actress Caroline Hunnisett. The couple have a daughter Tawney and a son Ned.

== Other work ==
Ivay is the Creative Director of a project to build a theatre in his home town of Blandford Forum. The project is called The Fording Point.

== Credits ==
=== Director ===
- Freebird - Feature film - Nationwide cinematic release UK 2008, Also Berlin Film Fest 2009, Cannes Film Festival 2009 and USA 2008. Opening Film, Dalmatian Film Festival (St Petersberg); prior to Russian & Eastern Europe Cinema Release.
- Freebird – Stageplay - Edinburgh Festival (Pleasance Theatre)
- Lonestar by James Mclure - Kenneth More Theatre Ilford/small scale tour
- Bouncers by John Godber - two national tours (also Lincoln Theatre Royal)
- Inside the Firm - Edinburgh Festival (Adam House Theatre). Won Spirit of the Fringe award
- Teechers by John Godber - two national tours
- Just Like That - National tour (two-act play) (also Edinburgh Festival Gilded balloon one-act play)
- Vintage Stuff by Tom Sharpe - national tour
- The Rise and Fall of Little Voice by Jim Cartwright - national tour
- Popcorn - two national tours
- Delorean - The Assembly Rooms, Edinburgh Fringe (and Touring)

=== Writer ===
- Inside The Firm – One act play - Edinburgh Festival - Adam House C-Venues
- Inside The Firm – Two act play – Queens Theatre Hornchurch
- Freebird – Stage play – Bristol Old Vic – Cockpit London – Edinburgh Festival
- Freebird – Feature film. UK and American release – Berlin and Cannes Festivals
- DELOREAN – Stage play (Edinburgh 2017)
- Anna's Call - Two Act Play (Writing)
- A Whitehall Farce - (Stage Play Announced)
- Catch A Falling Star - (Play with Original Music - Announced)

=== Producer ===
- Travels with My Aunt by Graham Greene. Co-produced by Salisbury Playhouse and national tour. Directed by Rupert Goold
- Inside the Firm by Jon Ivay. Co-produced by Queens Theatre and Hornchurch. Directed by Marina Calderone
- Travels with My Aunt - Co-produced by Chester Gateway and national Tour. Directed by Rupert Goold
- Travels with My Aunt - Co-produced by Exeter Northcott and Vienna Est (6 week run). Directed by Sue Lefton
- On the Piste by John Godber. National tour. Directed by James Puddephatt
- Outside Edge by Richard Harris. National tour. Directed by Grant Burgin
- Freebird by Jon Ivay. Co-produced by Bristol Old Vic. Directed by Ian Hastings
- Freebird - 1999. Cockpit Theatre London. Directed by Samantha Spiro
- Love Me Slender – Vanessa Brooks – 1999. Co-produced by Perth Theatre and national tour

=== Associate producer and management ===
- Ecstasy by Mike Leigh. Arts Theatre. West End. Directed by Patrick Davey
- Mr. Wonderful by James Robson. Chester Gateway. Directed by Deborah Shaw
