= Phil Daniels =

English actor and singer (born 1958)

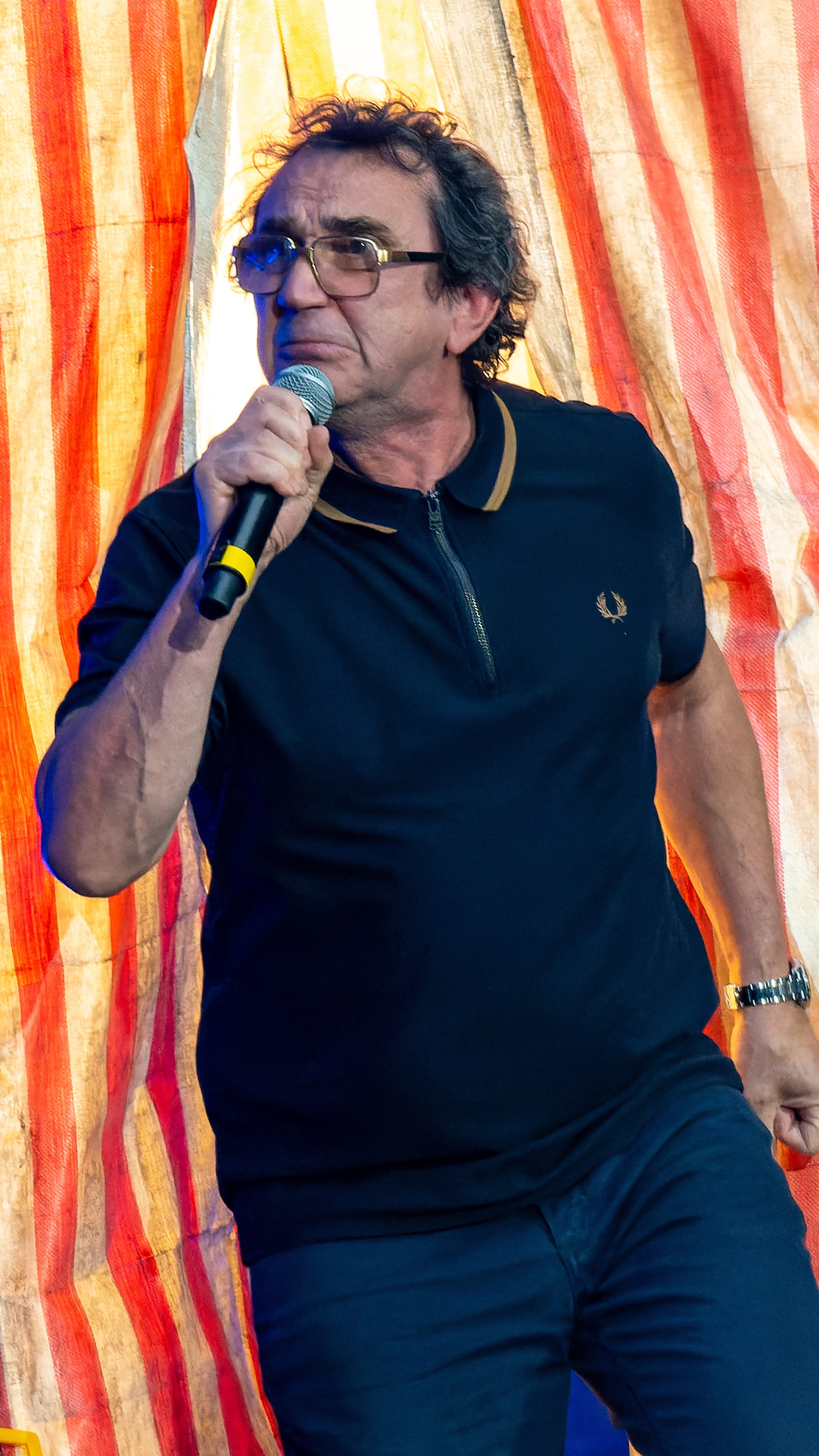
- Daniels performing with Blur in 2023
- Born: Philip William Daniels; 25 October 1958 (age 68); Islington, London, England
- Occupations: Actor; musician
- Years active: 1972–present
- Partner: Jan Stevens (died 2012)
- Children: 1

Philip William Daniels (born 25 October 1958) is an English actor, musician and singer, most noted for film and television roles playing Londoners, such as the lead role of Jimmy Cooper in Quadrophenia, Richards in Scum, Stewart in The Class of Miss MacMichael, Danny in Breaking Glass, Mark in Meantime, Billy Kid in Billy the Kid and the Green Baize Vampire, Kevin Wicks in EastEnders, Fetcher in Chicken Run, DCS Frank Patterson in New Tricks, and Grandad Trotter in the Only Fools and Horses prequel Rock & Chips. He is also known for playing Maester Gerardys in the fantasy television series House of the Dragon, and featuring on Blur's 1994 hit single "Parklife".

== Career ==
Daniels went to Rutherford Comprehensive School in Paddington, west London from 1970 to 1975, the same school as Danny John-Jules, Paul Hardcastle and footballer Tony Grealish. After training at the Anna Scher Theatre School in Islington, Daniels has made appearances in many films and television series.

He made his film debut in 1972 in Anoop and the Elephant. He had an incidental appearance (with fellow drama students) in 1975 in Thames Television's You Must Be Joking! In 1976, at the age of 17, he featured as a waiter in Bugsy Malone. Also in 1976 he had significant roles in three television series: The Molly Wopsies, Four Idle Hands, and The Flockton Flyer. Over the following four years he appeared in Quadrophenia, Breaking Glass and Scum. He also appeared in the 1977 TV drama serial Raven.

In the late 1970s and early 1980s, Daniels was a member of new wave band The Cross, along with fellow actor Peter Hugo Daly. They released an album (Phil Daniels + The Cross) and single, "Kill Another Night" on RCA Records in 1979. His musical inclinations were revealed when he starred in a 1985 British snooker musical Billy the Kid and the Green Baize Vampire. He narrated tracks "Parklife" and "Me, White Noise" on the Parklife and Think Tank albums for Blur.

He contributed the voice of Fetcher, the dull-witted rat to the animated film Chicken Run. In recent years he has turned his attention to comedy, appearing in the series Sunnyside Farm and alongside Al Murray in the cult sitcom Time Gentlemen Please. Daniels also starred as Freddy Windrush in an episode of Gimme Gimme Gimme (Series 2, Episode 3 – "Prison Visitor").

Daniels has performed on stage with the Royal Shakespeare Company in plays such as The Merchant of Venice, The Jew of Malta and A Clockwork Orange. In 2004 he appeared in the BBC comedy-drama Outlaws as a criminal solicitor.

In 2006 he joined the cast of the popular BBC soap opera EastEnders playing Kevin Wicks. The actor temporarily left the show in early 2007; however, he returned in March 2007. He left the show in August 2007, with his character dying in a brutal car crash in December 2007. Daniels, along with his co-stars, attended a Quadrophenia Reunion at London Film and Comic Con at Earls Court on 1 and 2 September 2007. In May 2008, Daniels ran the London Marathon on behalf of the "Sparks" Charity, and, in December 2008, starred in Sheffield Theatre and Evolution Pantomimes co-production of Aladdin as "Abanazar" at Lyceum Theatre, Sheffield. In late 2008, Daniels voiced a major character in the English language re-release of the cult 2006 Norwegian animated film Free Jimmy, alongside Woody Harrelson and with dialogue written by Simon Pegg. Also in 2008, Daniels starred alongside Gary Stretch and Geoff Bell in the UK film Freebird, directed by Jon Ivay, which followed three bikers across a drug-fuelled ride in the Welsh countryside. Daniels appeared in the 2008 series of Strictly Come Dancing with dancing partner Flavia Cacace; he was the first to be eliminated from the show on 21 September 2008.

He appeared on Celebrity Mastermind: 2008/2009, finishing in second place on 24 points. On 26 June 2009, he appeared on stage with Blur at the M.E.N. Arena and then again on 28 June 2009 at Glastonbury 2009 on their song "Parklife", as well as on 2/3 July 2009 in their Hyde Park Concerts. Daniels portrayed Edward Kitchener "Grandad" Trotter in the Only Fools and Horses prequel, Rock & Chips. He co-starred with actress Kellie Bright (who played Grandad's daughter-in-law, Joan), with whom he had previously appeared alongside in EastEnders. 2012 (2013 in the UK) saw the release of the film Vinyl in which Daniels not only stars but also wrote and performs most of the film's music soundtrack. Directed by Sara Sugarman, Vinyl is the story of an aging rock group forced to con the music industry to gain radio play of future record releases. The film is based on true events faced by The Alarm that took place in the UK in 2004.

In September 2012, Daniels appeared in a production of This House at the National Theatre's Cottesloe Theatre; it transferred to the Olivier in February 2013. In 2015, it was announced that he would play the role of Thenardier in Les Misérables. Daniels revisited his role in a revival of This House at Chichester's Minerva Theatre in September 2016 and appeared in the same play (November 2016 – Feb 2017) at the Garrick Theatre in London's West End. In 2017, he recorded two songs for the album Wit & Whimsy – Songs by Alexander S. Bermange (one solo and one featuring all of the album's 23 artists), which reached No. 1 in the iTunes comedy album chart.

Daniels was a contestant in the 2020 BBC Celebrity MasterChef.

In 2021, it was announced that Daniels would star alongside Jonathan Bailey, Taron Egerton and Jade Anouka in a production of Mike Bartlett’s Cock at the Ambassadors Theatre, London, in 2022.

In April 2023, Daniels appeared as Reggie in the BBC black comedy Inside No. 9. The episode was series 8 episode 2, "Mother's Ruin".

In July 2023, Daniels featured as a special guest at Blur's concerts at Wembley Stadium, London, for the song "Parklife".

== Personal life ==
Daniels had a 30-year relationship with Jan Stevens, a record industry associate and former employee at Track Records whom he met in the 1980s, until her death from pancreatic cancer in 2012. They had one daughter, born in 1990.

He is a supporter of Chelsea F.C. and was a survivor of the Eltham Well Hall rail crash.

== Filmography ==
=== Film ===
Year	Film	Role	Notes
1972	Anoop and the Elephant	Billy	
1976	Bugsy Malone	Waiter	
1978	The Class of Miss MacMichael	Stewart	
1979	Zulu Dawn	Pullen	
1979	Quadrophenia	Jimmy Cooper	
1979	Scum	Richards	
1980	Breaking Glass	Danny	
1984	Meantime	Mark Pollock	
1985	The Bride	Bela	
1985	Billy the Kid and the Green Baize Vampire	Billy Kid	
1998	Still Crazy	Neil Gaydon	
1999	Nasty Neighbours	Robert Chapman	
1999	Last Christmas	Geoff	
2000	Chicken Run	Fetcher	Voice
2001	Goodbye Charlie Bright	Eddie	
2006	Free Jimmy	Gaz	Voice; English language version released in 2008
2008	Freebird	Grouch	
2012	Vinyl	Johnny Jones	
2017	The Hatton Garden Job	Danny Jones	
2026	Wicker	The Butcher	

=== Television ===
Year	Title	Role	Notes
1975	Wodehouse Playhouse	Office Boy	Uncredited
1975	Shades of Greene	Blackie	Episode: "The Destructors"
1975	The Naked Civil Servant	First Boy	TV film
1976	The Molly Wopsies	Alan Musgrove	Miniseries
1976	Second City Firsts	Barry	Episode: "Glitter"
1976–1979	Play for Today	First Youth/Richards	2 episodes, including Scum
1977	BBC Play of the Month	Boy	Episode: "The Country Wife"
1977	The Flockton Flyer	Don Davis	Episode: "Pull the Other One"
1977	Raven	Raven	Miniseries
1981	BBC Television Shakespeare	Puck	Episode: A Midsummer Night's Dream
1982	I Remember Nelson	William Blackie	Episode: "Battle"
1985	The Pickwick Papers	Sam Weller	10 episodes
1986	Big Deal	Richard	Episode: "Panel Money"
1987	Screen Two	Sprint	Episode: "Will You Love Me Tomorrow?"
1990	Boon	Joe	Episode: "Undercover"
1993	Lovejoy	Boyd	Episode: "Swings and Roundabouts"
1994	The All New Alexei Sayle Show	Various	1 episode
1995	Performance	John	Episode: After Miss Julie
1995	One Foot in the Grave	Melvin	Episode: "The Wisdom of the Witch"
1995	The World of Lee Evans	Hitcher	Episode: "One Late Night"
1997	Sunnyside Farm	Raymond Sunnyside	Miniseries
1997	Holding On	Gary Rickey	Miniseries
1999	Sex, Chips & Rock n' Roll	Larry Valentine	TV film
2000	Gimme Gimme Gimme	Freddy Windrush	Episode: "Prison Visitor"
2000–2002	Time Gentlemen Please	Terry Brooks	36 episodes
2004	The Long Firm	Jimmy	Episode: "Jimmy's Story"
2004	Waking the Dead	Det Supt Andy Bulmer	Episode: "The Hardest Word"
2004	Outlaws	Bruce Dunbar	12 episodes
2006–2008	EastEnders	Kevin Wicks	208 episodes
2009	Misfits	Keith the Dog	Voice; pilot
2009	Agatha Christie's Poirot	Inspector Hardcastle	Episode: "The Clocks"
2009–2010	New Tricks	D.C.S. Frank Paterson	2 episodes
2010	Midsomer Murders	Teddy Molloy	Episode: "The Noble Art"
2010–2011	Rock & Chips	Ted Trotter	Miniseries
2013	Moonfleet	Ratsey	Miniseries
2017	Zapped	Warden of the Pear Orchard	Episode: "Pear Fair"
2018–2023	Endeavour	Charlie Thursday	3 episodes
2019–2021	Sliced	Scott	5 episodes
2020	Call the Midwife	George Benson	1 episode
2020	Adult Material	Dave	Miniseries
2020–2022	I Hate Suzie	Phil	4 episodes
2021	The Mallorca Files	Frank Bottomley	Episode: "Son of a Pig"
2022	Agatha Raisin	Archie Swale	Episode: "Love, Lies and Liquor"
2022–2026	House of the Dragon	Maester Gerardys	13 episodes
2023–2026	Beyond Paradise	Marvelous Harris	2 episodes
2023	Partygate	Mickey Port	TV film
2023	Boat Story	Craig Dodds	4 episodes
2023–2024	Inside No. 9	Party Guest/Reggie	2 episodes
2025	Gangs of London	Ronnie Deveraux	1 episode
2026	Waiting for the Out	Frank Gifford	4 episodes
2026	Father Brown	Frank Hicks	Episode: "The Power of Suggestion"

=== Radio ===
Year	Title	Role	Notes
1990	The Old Curiosity Shop	Daniel Quilp	BBC Radio 4
1991	The Personal History of David Copperfield	Uriah Heep	BBC Radio 4
1999	The Tin Drum	Oskar Matzerath	
2009	On The Ceiling		Saturday Play, BBC Radio 4

=== Theatre ===
- Aladdin Sheffield Lyceum
- Fresh Kills
- True West
- The Green Man
- The Winter's Tale
- Dealer's Choice
- Carousel
- The Closing Number
- Johnny Oil Strikes Back
- The Lucky Ones
- The Merchant of Venice
- The Jew of Malta
- Measure for Measure
- The Revenger's Tragedy
- A Clockwork Orange
- Rosencrantz and Guildenstern Are Dead
- The Beggar's Opera
- The God of Soho
- Antony and Cleopatra
- Les Miserables
- This House
- A Very Very Very Dark Matter

== Discography ==
Albums

- Phil Daniels + The Cross (Phil Daniels + The Cross) (1979)

Singles

- "Kill Another Night" (Phil Daniels + The Cross) (1979)
- "Penultimate Person" (Phil Daniels + The Cross) (1980, Europe only)
- "The Stranglers and Friends – Live in Concert". Phil Daniels is one of the singers in place of Hugh Cornwell, The Stranglers' lead singer who was imprisoned at the time (1980)
- "Parklife" (Blur featuring Phil Daniels) (1994)
- "Free Rock and Roll" from the film Vinyl (Phil Daniels, Keith Allen and The Alarm) (2013)

Other songs

- "Me, White Noise" on Think Tank (Blur featuring Phil Daniels) (2003)
