= Roy Minton =

English playwright and screenwriter (1933–2024)

- Born: Roy Davies; 28 August 1933; Nottingham, England
- Died: 17 August 2024 (aged 90)
- Education: Guildhall School of Music and Drama
- Occupations: Playwright, screenwriter

Roy Minton (28 August 1933 – 17 August 2024) was an English playwright and screenwriter best known for Scum and his other work with Alan Clarke. He is notable for having written over 30 one-off scripts for London Weekend Television, Rediffusion, BBC, ATV, Granada, Thames Television and Yorkshire Television, including Sling Your Hook, Horace, Funny Farm, Scum, Goodnight Albert, and The Hunting of Lionel Crane.

Minton translated and performed several of his plays overseas and at festivals in the UK, including a reading of his play for Scum at the Royal Shakespeare Company, London; and Gradual Decline at the Riverside Studios London.

Minton also wrote the screenplay for Scrubbers, a film from which he disassociated himself. He felt the original screenplay had been "savaged" during his absence overseas, and described the final production as "arguably the worst film ever made."

== Background ==
Minton was born Roy Davies, in Nottingham, England on 28 August 1933. He won a two-year scholarship at the Guildhall School of Music and Drama, London. Minton worked as an actor prior to writing full-time. He was winner of a BBC playwriting competition, received the Art Council Award and was resident dramatist at the Nottingham Playhouse.

Minton later lived in north London, and worked towards an autobiography. He died on 17 August 2024, at the age of 90.

== Works ==
=== Stage plays ===
- Death in Leicester
- Sometime Never
- Ag and Fish
- Good Times
- Bovver
- Funny Sunday
- Scum
- Gradual Decline

=== Feature films ===
- Scum
- Scrubbers

=== Radio plays ===
- Working Weekend BBC
- A Kiss on the Peke Radio Telefís Éireann, Dublin.
- The Gold Medallist BBC

=== Films and plays for television ===
- Stand by Your Screen
- Sling Your Hook
- Goodnight Albert
- Horace
- Horace 6 x 30-minute plays for Yorkshire Television based on the original BBC film.
- Funny Farm
- Scum
- Fast Hands

== Awards ==
- Arts Council Award
