= Gary Stretch =

British boxer, model, and actor

Personal information
- Born: 4 November 1965 (age 60) St Helens, Lancashire, England
- Weight: Light-middleweight

Boxing career
- Stance: Southpaw

Boxing record
- Total fights: 31
- Wins: 29
- Win by KO: 20
- Losses: 2

Gary Stretch (born 4 November 1965) is a British boxer, actor, model, producer, and screenwriter. During his boxing career, Stretch won 29 of his 31 fights, 20 of those by KO. He became the WBC International Super Welterweight Champion.

In his modelling career, Stretch modelled for brands including Calvin Klein and Versace. During his acting career, he starred in such films as The Heavy (directed by Marcus Warren) and Alexander (directed by Oliver Stone). He was also cast in the Shane Meadows film Dead Man’s Shoes as the small-time gang leader, Sonny, for which role he was nominated for a British Independent Film Award for Best Supporting Actor.

== Early life ==
Stretch was born in 1965 and brought up in the Haresfinch area of St Helens, Lancashire. His father was a plumber. He attended the town's Cowley High School.

Aged eight, Stretch was kicked out of school for fighting. A condition of returning was that he learn discipline and would have to go to the boxing gym three nights a week. For nine months he stood in the corner of the gym, never picking up a glove, until finally deciding to try the sport.

== Career ==
=== Boxing ===
A southpaw fighter, Stretch boxed most of his career as a light-middleweight, rising to become British champion in that division.

He won the WBC International Light Middleweight title, beating Ramon Angel Alegre at the London Arena on 14 February 1990, the fight billed as Valentine's Day Massacre. Stretch, aged 24, stopped the Argentine in the 6th round of a very one sided contest. Stretch relinquished the title due to a management dispute with Frank Warren and subsequently sat out his contract.

Stretch's return to the ring came in 1991 when he challenged Chris Eubank for the WBO world middleweight championship in London, in a fight billed as "Beauty V the Best". Stretch suffered a cut behind the ear in the first round and was shaken by an uppercut in the third. In the sixth round Stretch had a point deducted for pushing Eubank onto the canvas after Eubank had lunged in low; Stretch was shaken by a right hand from Eubank and knocked to one knee from a further Eubank combination, taking an eight count. Not fully recovered, Stretch was knocked through the ropes by another Eubank right and though he regained his feet, the referee deemed him unable to continue and stopped the fight. At the time of the stoppage, Stretch was up on all 3 judges scorecards.

Stretch fought only once more after his bout with Eubank before retiring with a career record of 29 wins 1 loss and 1 NC (an accidental clash of heads causing Stretch to be cut on the forehead).

=== Modelling ===
During his time as a boxer, Stretch also worked as a model. His clients included Calvin Klein and Versace.

=== Acting ===
Stretch was cast as Cleitus alongside Anthony Hopkins, Colin Farrell and Angelina Jolie in Oliver Stone's 2004 film Alexander. Stone went on to cast Stretch again in World Trade Center as a paramedic, and in Savages. In 2004, Stretch was cast as psychopathic gangster Sonny in Shane Meadows' gritty cult thriller Dead Man's Shoes (2004), for which Stretch received a BIFA nomination alongside fellow English actor Paddy Considine.

Stretch also starred in Freebird in 2008, directed by Jon Ivay. With Stretch appearing alongside Phil Daniels and Geoff Bell, the film followed three bikers across a drug-fueled ride in the Welsh countryside.

== Personal life ==
From 1998 to 2001, Stretch was married to actress Roselyn Sánchez.

== Filmography ==
- Tis a Gift to Be Simple (1994) ... Perry Truman
- Final Combination (1994) ... Richard Welton
- Infidelity/Hard Fall (1997) ... Shane
- Business for Pleasure (1997) ... Rolf
- Shergar (1999) ... SAS Soldier
- Dead Dogs Lie (2001) ... Duck
- Final Combat (2003) ... Jaikra
- A Good Night to Die (2003) ... Ronnie
- Dead Man's Shoes (2004) ... Sonny
- Alexander (2004) ... Cleitus
- The King Maker (2005) ... Fernando De Gamma
- World Trade Center (2006) ... John's Paramedic
- The Commander: Windows of the Soul (2007) ... Jack Bannerman
- Afghan Knights (2007) ... Nash
- Tied in Knots (2008) ... Jay
- Freebird (2008) ... Fred
- Deadwater (2008) ... Colin Willets
- The Heavy (2010) ... Mitchell 'Boots' Mason
- Baseline (2010) ... Rob
- Mega Shark Versus Crocosaurus (2010)
- Yellow
- The Girl from the Naked Eye (2012) ... Frank
- The Pugilist's Son (short) (2012) ... Terry Hope
- Savages (2013) ... Bad Ass Biker
- Jurassic Attack (2013) ... Captain John Stakeley
- My Father Die (2016) ... Ivan
