= Freebird (2008 film) =

- Directed by: Jon Ivay
- Written by: Jon Ivay
- Produced by: Stephen Woolley
- Starring: Gary Stretch; Geoff Bell; Phil Daniels; Peter Bowles
- Cinematography: Stephen Woolley
- Music by: Stephen Woolley
- Production companies: Freebird Pictures, LLC.
- Distributed by: Phaze UK
- Release date: 1 February 2008
- Running time: 96 minutes
- Country: United Kingdom
- Language: English

Freebird is a 2008 British comedy film directed by Jon Ivay and starring Gary Stretch, Geoff Bell, Phil Daniels and Peter Bowles. The film received mixed reception from critics.

== Plot ==
Three friends, Fred (Stretch), Tyg (Bell) and Grouch (Daniels), set out on a motorcycle trip to Wales in order to bring back a haul of cannabis for Fred's friend The Chairman (Bowles). What was meant to be a nice weekend in the country soon turns into an ordeal.

Along the way, they encounter revenge seeking bikers and a giant masked wrestler in the pub. Or maybe it's just those magic mushrooms they had for breakfast.

== Production ==
The film was shot in and around Hay-on-Wye in Wales, and London.
