= The Love-Girl and the Innocent =

Play by Alexander Solzhenitsyn

The Love-Girl and the Innocent (Russian: Олень и шалашовка; also translated The Tenderfoot and the Tart, and The Greenhorn and the Tramp) is a play in four acts by Russian author Aleksandr Solzhenitsyn. It is set over the course of about one week in 1945 in a Joseph Stalin–era Soviet prison camp. As in many of Solzhenitsyn's works, the author paints a vivid and honest picture of the suffering prisoners and their incompetent but powerful wardens. Most of the prisoners depicted in the play are serving 10 year sentences for violations of Soviet Penal Code Article 58.

In this play, the author first explores the analogy of the camp system to a separate nation within the Soviet Union, an analogy which would dominate his later work, most clearly in The Gulag Archipelago.

The play has a fairly large cast of characters, mostly prisoners at the camp. The play has many difficult staging and set directions. Truckloads of prisoners arrive onstage, characters appear onstage pouring (and spilling) molten iron in a camp foundry, and one scene calls for a three-story building in the foreground of the set, with layered barbed wire and bare steppe stretching into the background "as far as the eye can see", with an excavator operating in the distance. Despite this, the play has been performed in public many times, making its American premiere at the Guthrie Theater in Minneapolis, Minnesota, in 1970.

A television adaptation of the play was broadcast by the BBC in the Play of the Month series in 1973.

== Plot summary ==
The prisoner Nemov, apparently the story's hero, is an honest man serving a term of 10 years for violations of Article 58. At the play's start, Nemov is the production chief of his work group and is later replaced by Prisoner Engineer Khomich. One of the play's clear recurring themes is the idea that Nemov's honesty is worthless in the face of the realities of camp life. All of the characters who prosper in the play can only do so by means of moral compromises.

The most accessible and traditional plot element is the romance between the two prisoners Nemov (the "innocent" of the title) and Lyuba (the "love-girl"). Nemov learns that Lyuba is having sex with the camp doctor Mereshchun in exchange for better food and living conditions. When Nemov demands that she stop seeing Mereshchun, Lyuba refuses and a conflict arises.

This lovers' conflict does not arise until almost the end of the play, in the final scene of Act III. Their dilemma is apparently resolved in the very brief Act IV, at the end of which an injured and dejected Nemov watches Lyuba enter Mereshchun's office yet again.

The title of the play suggests that the romance of Nemov and Lyuba is meant to be the central plot element, but the romance occupies relatively little stage time. Most of the play is spent in developing the characters of Nemov and Lyuba as they live and work in total ignorance of each other, and in exploring the realities of camp life. Much of the play develops characters and situations that have little or nothing at all to do with the specifics of the romance.
