= Scum (film) =

1979 British drama film by Alan Clarke

- Theatrical release poster
- Directed by: Alan Clarke
- Written by: Roy Minton
- Produced by: Davina Belling; Clive Parsons; Don Boyd; Michael Relph; Martin Campbell
- Starring: Ray Winstone; Mick Ford; Julian Firth; Phil Daniels
- Cinematography: Phil Méheux
- Edited by: Michael Bradsell
- Production companies: Kendon Films; Berwick Street Films "A"
- Distributed by: GTO
- Release dates: 12 September 1979 (Toronto International Film Festival); 20 September 1979 (London)
- Running time: 97 minutes
- Country: United Kingdom
- Language: English
- Budget: £250,000

Scum is a 1979 British prison drama film directed by Alan Clarke and starring Ray Winstone, Mick Ford, Julian Firth and John Blundell. The film portrays the brutality of life inside a British borstal. The script was originally filmed as a television play for the BBC's Play for Today series in 1977. However, owing to the violence depicted, it was withdrawn from broadcast. Two years later, director Alan Clarke and scriptwriter Roy Minton remade it as a theatrical film. Channel 4 first broadcast the film in 1983. By this time, the borstal system had been reformed. The original television version was first broadcast on 27 July 1991, fourteen years after it was made.

The film tells the story of a young offender named Carlin as he arrives at the institution and his rise through violence and self-protection to the top of the inmates' pecking order, purely as a tool to survive. Beyond Carlin's individual storyline, the film also serves as an indictment of the borstal system's flaws, with no attempt at rehabilitation. The warders and convicts alike are brutalised by the system. The film's controversy arose over its graphic depiction of racism, extreme violence, rape, suicide, many fights and very strong language.

== Plot ==
Three young men arrive at a borstal by prison van: Carlin, who has taken the blame for his brother's theft of scrap metal; Angel for stealing a car; and Davis for escaping from an open institution. Each is allocated a room; Angel and Davis get single rooms, while Carlin is sent to a dormitory.

Carlin, having been transferred for assaulting a warden, wants to keep a low profile. He meets and befriends Archer, an eccentric and intellectual inmate serving two years for workplace fraud who is intent upon peacefully inconveniencing the staff as much as possible through nonviolent resistance. Archer tells Carlin how his reputation is already known: Banks, the current "Daddy" (the inmate who controls the wing), is seeking Carlin for a fight to maintain his dominance over the wing. Banks's status appears to have been achieved by petty bullying and intimidation with the aid of his henchmen Richards and Eckersley and the passive assent of the staff.

Carlin struggles to settle into the dormitory and, after witnessing the timid and vulnerable Davis hazed and attacked by Banks, is himself viciously beaten and headbutted by Banks in an unprovoked attack. Angel is brutally beaten up by Banks and Richards in his room. Davis is framed for theft of a radio by Eckersley and placed on report. Soon sentenced to arrest, the three newcomers find themselves in solitary confinement. Realising there is no hope of being allowed to serve his term as a borstal trainee in peace, Carlin exacts revenge and establishes dominance. Walking through the association (rec) room, he picks up two snooker balls and puts them in a sock. Using this improvised cosh on Richards, Carlin orders Eckersley to desist from informing, then goes to find Banks. Surprising him in a washroom he gives Banks a severe beating and then tells him who the "Daddy" of the wing now is: one who will 'kill him' if Banks ever interferes with his wellbeing. This ambush required cooperation and information from other inmates, showing how Carlin has soon won both respect and amity.

Several days later, Carlin is challenged by an adjacent wing's Daddy whom he viciously beats but allows to continue to manage his wing under Carlin's overall control. Things improve for the inmates under Carlin, with victimisation of younger, weaker prisoners prevented, along with racially motivated violence. He keeps to the same seat at table in the dining hall, to where information and requests are directed, and with his associates such as Archer, Betts, Rhodes and Meakin – a contrast to Banks and his bullies. Carlin's status is recognised by the warders: he requests and gets a single cell in return for agreeing to be a responsible "natural leader" to the housemaster Mr Goodyear.

Meanwhile, Meakin's friend Toyne learns through a letter from his in-laws that his wife has died. He becomes severely depressed, his despair being noticed by the warders, who scold him for "moping". Toyne slashes the arteries in his arms. He is transferred to an adult prison, and Meakin is later informed by Dougan that Toyne died after a second suicide attempt. Meakin is outraged by this and berates the staff for their negligence before storming out of the meeting. Carlin is instructed by Mr Goodyear to keep the inmates under control, but while working alone in a greenhouse, Davis is gang-raped by three opportunistic youths who had requested a smoking break. Their supervising warder Sands sees what happens but reacts with a grin and then ignores the dishevelled state of the semi-undressed trio as they return. That night, a distraught Davis kills himself with a razor blade. While bleeding to death, he presses the button in his cell for help, but is ignored by warden Greaves.

Davis's suicide is the last straw for the Borstal inmates. In the dining hall, having collected their food, the inmates sit silently, refusing to eat. Carlin initiates a full-scale riot in the dinner hall. Carlin, Archer and Meakin are later shown being dragged, bleeding and unconscious, into solitary confinement after having been beaten by the wardens. The Borstal's Governor later informs them the damage to the dinner hall will be repaid through lost earnings. The Governor then declares a minute's silent prayer for Davis.

== Cast ==
=== Inmates ===
- Ray Winstone as Carlin
- Mick Ford as Archer
- Julian Firth as Davis
- John Blundell as Banks
- Phil Daniels as Richards
- Ray Burdis as Eckersley
- Alan Igbon as Meakin
- John Fowler as Woods
- Patrick Murray as Dougan
- Herbert Norville as Toyne
- George Winter as Rhodes
- Alrick Riley as Angel
- Philip DaCosta as Jackson
- Peter Francis as Baldy
- Andrew Paul as Betts
- Sean Chapman as James
- Ozzie Stevens as Smith
- Ricky Wales as Chambers
- Perry Benson as Formby
- John Rogan as Escort

=== Borstal staff ===
- Peter Howell as The Governor
- John Judd as Mr Sands
- Philip Jackson as Mr Greaves
- John Grillo as Mr Goodyear
- Bill Dean as Mr Duke
- P. H. Moriarty as Mr Hunt
- Nigel Humphreys as Mr Taylor
- Jo Kendall as Matron
- James Donnelly as Mr Whittle
- Joe Fordham as Reg
- Ian Liston as Mr White
- Charles Rayford as Mr Philpott
- Ray Jewers as Gym Instructor

== Production ==
The film was part of a slate of five movies worth £3 million in all produced by Don Boyd.

=== Deviations from original BBC production ===
The film differs from the original BBC production in many respects. The film contains strong language and is much more violent and graphic than the milder BBC version. Ray Winstone, John Blundell, Phil Daniels, John Judd, Ray Burdis and Patrick Murray all reprise their respective roles as Carlin, Banks, Richards, Sands, Eckersley and Dougan from the BBC version, while all other roles are recast. David Threlfall had been intended to reprise his role as Archer from the BBC version, but he was working with the Royal Shakespeare Company at the time and was subsequently replaced by Mick Ford. The story was also changed. The BBC version features a homosexual relationship between Carlin and another inmate, which was dropped from the film. Minton later said that this was a pity as it would have expanded Carlin's character and made him vulnerable in an area where he could not afford to be vulnerable.

The television play version of the film also features less graphic rape and suicide scenes. An additional scene shows Davis trying to talk to Carlin about the incident. Carlin dismisses him when he is reluctant to talk in front of Carlin's 'missus' (partner). In the remake, the relationship between Carlin and his 'missus' does not feature. Instead, during the mess, Davis looks up at Carlin from the dining table as if about to confide in him, but Carlin unwittingly chooses that moment to get up and leave.

Also in the television play, it is made clear at the end of the film that Banks is in hospital – resulting from the beating administered by Carlin when ousting him as the "daddy"; in the theatrical version, he is present during the final moment of silence.

== Release ==
The film had its UK premiere at the Prince Charles Cinema in London. It opened on 20 September 1979 at the Prince Charles Cinema and finished fifth at the London box office with a gross of £18,074 in its first week.

=== 2017 re-release ===
In 2017, Kino Lorber re-released the film in selected theatres for a limited time. In the United States, the film grossed $5,405.

== Critical reception ==
In a High Court case against Channel 4 for showing the film, British morality campaigner Mary Whitehouse initially won her private prosecution, but the decision was later reversed on appeal. The Independent Broadcasting Authority had approved its transmission. However, the film was well received by critics, and today has a reputation as a cult classic.

Philip Thomas of Empire said of the film, "Scum's brutality makes it a genuinely harrowing film. The bleak, snow-dusted locations, the featureless interiors of the institution, the perfect casting and magnificent acting of the indifferent and brutal staff make borstal appear to be what can only be described as a living hell."

On review aggregator website Rotten Tomatoes, the film holds an approval rating of 89% based on reviews from 9 critics. Metacritic gives the film a score of 78 out of 100, based on reviews by 11 critics, indicating "generally favorable reviews".

== Legacy ==
In 2010, a Canadian film heavily based on Scum, titled Dog Pound, was released.

== Home media ==
The film was first released on VHS video in the UK in 1983, where it was immediately caught up in the UK video nasty controversy of the early 1980s.

It was later released on DVD in the UK by Odyssey and Prism Leisure. It was the digitally remastered uncut version but in full-screen, with only a trailer and an interview as bonus features. In the US, an Alan Clarke box set was issued that included several films, among them both the BBC original and cinema version of the film plus audio commentaries. Prism Leisure released a limited-edition two-disc set in the UK on 13 June 2005. Disc One featured the BBC version with an audio commentary and two interviews. Disc Two featured the theatrical remake with an audio commentary, several interviews and featurettes and two trailers. It was digitally remastered from a widescreen print. This special edition DVD was sold in Amaray slipcase packaging and also in a limited edition tin case. A Region 0 DVD box set featuring both the theatrical version and the 1977 BBC-banned television version on separate discs followed in the US, released by Blue Underground. In 2015, Australian company Shock Entertainment released Scum on DVD and Blu-ray as part of their Cinema Cult line.

A 4K version of the movie was released in August 2025 by 88 Films.
