= Jennifer Wilson (actress) =

English actress (1932–2022)

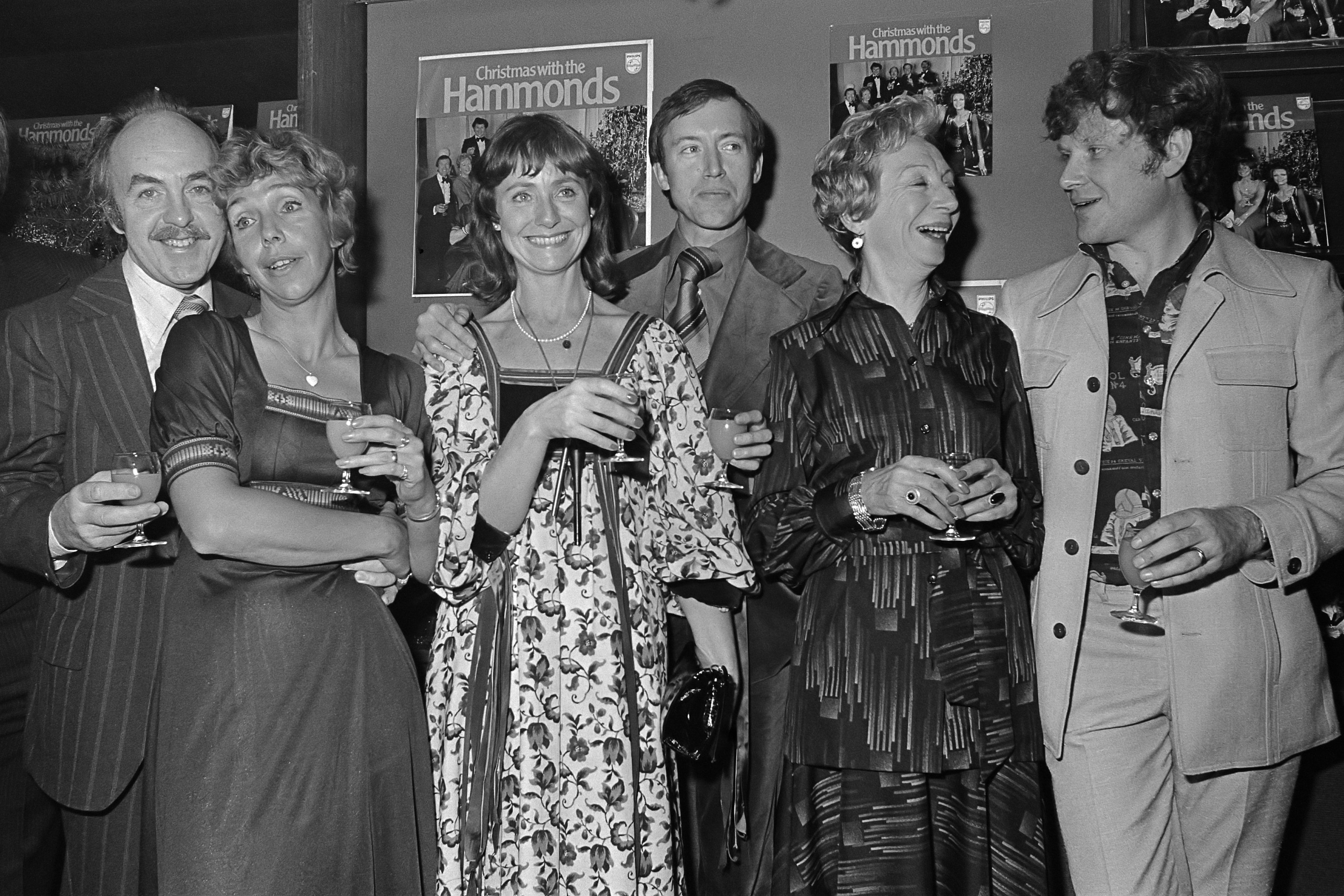
- The Brothers (1976), left to right: Derek Benfield, Margaret Ashcroft, Jennifer Wilson, Robin Chadwick, Jean Anderson, Colin Baker
- Born: Jennifer Wenda Lohr; 25 April 1932; London, Middlesex, England
- Died: 29 March 2022 (aged 89); France
- Occupation: Actress
- Years active: 1952–2015

Jennifer Wenda Wilson (25 April 1932 – 29 March 2022) was an English actress. Beginning her on-screen acting career in the 1950s, she played Kate Nickleby in a BBC dramatisation of Nicholas Nickleby in 1957. Wilson's last acting roles were as Mrs. Bradbury in Coronation Street in 2014 and as Nancy Milne in three episodes of the BBC lunchtime soap Doctors between 2014 and 2015.

== Life and career ==
Wilson began her film career in The Story of Gilbert and Sullivan (1953), while still at RADA, from which she graduated in 1952. One of her earliest television roles was Kate Nickleby in the 1957 BBC Television adaptation of Nicholas Nickleby. She played Detective Sergeant Helen Webb in the first series of ITV's Special Branch (1969) and, in probably her best known role, Jennifer Hammond in the 1970s series The Brothers. In 1965, she appeared in Bill Naughton's Spring and Port Wine at the Mermaid Theatre, London in the part of Florence.

== Family ==
Her first husband was the artist Stanley Swain, whom she married in 1954. In 1959, she married actor Brian Peck (1930–2021).

== Death ==
Wilson died at her home in France on 29 March 2022, at the age of 89.

== Selected television filmography ==
- Dixon of Dock Green (1956)
- Electrode 93 (1957)
- Nicholas Nickleby (1957)
- Champion Road (1958)
- Gideon's Way (1964)
- No Hiding Place (1964)
- Compact (1965)
- The Mind of Mr. J.G. Reeder (1969)
- Special Branch (1969)
- Z-Cars (1970)
- The Brothers (1972)
- Coronation Street (2014)
- Doctors (2014–2015)
