= John Neville (actor) =

English actor and theatre director (1925–2011)

John Neville CM OBE
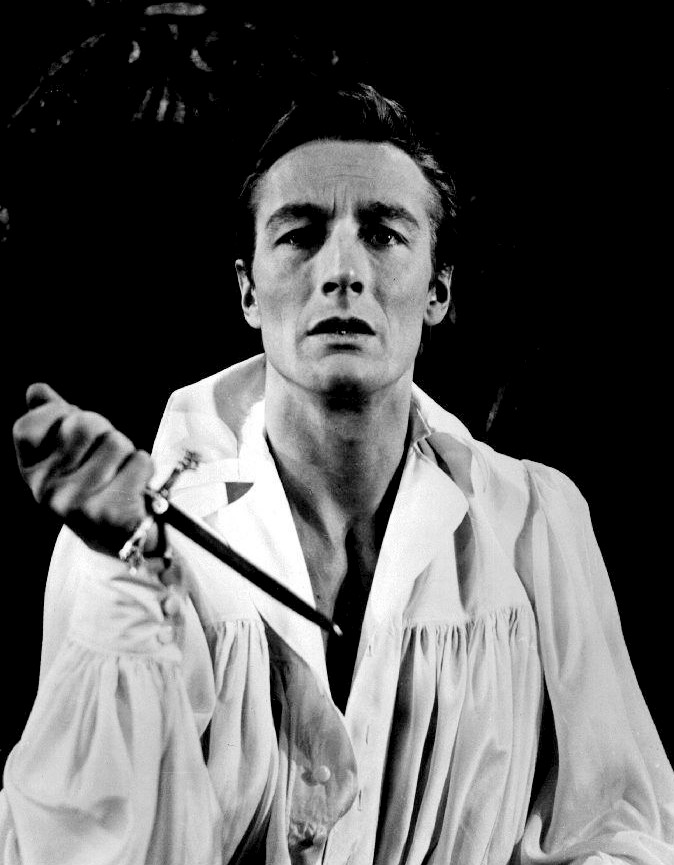
- Neville as Prince Hamlet in a 1959 TV production of Hamlet
- Born: John Reginald Neville; 2 May 1925; Willesden, London, England
- Died: 19 November 2011 (aged 86); Toronto, Ontario, Canada
- Citizenship: United Kingdom; Canada
- Education: Chiswick County School for Boys
- Alma mater: Royal Academy of Dramatic Art
- Occupations: Actor, director
- Years active: 1949–2006
- Spouse: Caroline Hooper (m. 1949)
- Children: 6
- Relatives: Joe Dinicol (grandson)

John Reginald Neville CM OBE (2 May 1925 – 19 November 2011) was an English actor and theatre director whose career spanned more than sixty years. He was renowned for his roles on both stage and screen in genres ranging from classical theatre to fantasy and science fiction.

Neville was one of the young leading lights of the British theatre in the early 1950s, and he and contemporary and friend Richard Burton honed their craft at the Old Vic, where over the course of five years they worked their way through the Shakespearean canon. Based on their performance styles and physicality, it was commented at the time that Burton was seen as the successor to Laurence Olivier, whereas Neville was seen as the natural successor to John Gielgud. Neville was a great champion of young talent throughout his career, as was evident when a 23-year-old Judi Dench made her professional debut as Ophelia opposite his Hamlet in 1957.

Alongside the classical repertoire, Neville also worked on contemporary productions. He originated the titular role of Alfie in Bill Naughton's 1963 play Alfie. It was in that same year that he, along with Frank Dunlop and Peter Ustinov, became artistic directors of the Nottingham Playhouse, with Neville later assuming sole charge. It was under his leadership that he played the leading part in Coriolanus, directed by Tyrone Guthrie, playing opposite a young Ian McKellen in the role of Tullus Aufidius. After leaving Nottingham in 1972, Neville emigrated to Canada, where he enjoyed further theatrical success in Stratford, Ontario at the Stratford Festival Theatre.

Neville enjoyed a resurgence of international attention in the 1980s as a result of his starring role in Terry Gilliam's cult classic The Adventures of Baron Munchausen (1988) and latterly in the sci-fi series The X-Files, playing the sinister role of the Well-Manicured Man.

== Early life and education ==
John Neville was born on 2 May 1925 in 197 Church Road, in the north London suburb of Willesden, the son of Mabel Lillian (née Fry) and Reginald Daniel Neville, who worked as a mechanic for the local council, Neville also had a younger sister called Joan. He was educated at Willesden and Chiswick County School for Boys. It was here at the age of eleven, that he directed his first play, 'The Lamentable Comedy of Pyramus and Thisby' from Shakespeare's A Midsummer Night's Dream, with the play being performed at the end of term.

Outside of school, Neville was being taken to the Old Vic and Stratford upon Avon by Frank Aubrey Dawson, the churchwarden at St Michael and All Angels Stonebridge Park, the local parish church where Neville sang in the choir. Towards the end of July 1937 the pair went on a holiday for two weeks to Stratford upon Avon. For three years in a row, he was taken along with Dawson's five nieces, one of which included future historian Lorna Arnold, who recalled that "in time he became one of our extended family". With the Blitz raining down on London, Neville and his family moved to Beaconsfield for six months, with his school being evacuated to nearby High Wycombe, it was here that Neville played, his first significant part as, Brutus in Julius Caesar.

Returning for his final terms at school near Wembley, Neville left before he was just 17. With him taking a small time job as a stores clerk in a nearby garage in Neasden. Persuaded to join the St. Michael's youth club from his church, Neville was asked to establish a youth drama group, something he later recalled when interviewed by Richard Ouzounian later in life. It proved tricky to get the local children to get as passionately involved with his drama club as he was, so had to barter with the boxing and table tennis clubs for members. The National Federation of Boys' Clubs was affiliated to the British Drama League, with Neville beginning to attend courses. A female director from the London County Council directed his club in Act I of Hamlet. With St. Michael's winning the first drama festival in Willeden. Audiences were impressed by his voice and the potential it held.

Thanks to Dawson's introduction to the classics, Neville had, by now, seen all of Shakespeare's plays and it was at those trips to the theatre that Neville's passion for acting, and Shakespeare in particular, began to develop. As a result of the interest in his recent performance, he decided that he wished to become an actor. However, with little money, his parents were unable to pay for such a venture. The local Willesden Borough Council suitably impressed informed Neville that they would provide him with a scholarship grant on the proviso that he got in, as would Middlesex County Council who would provide a grant for his living expenses. In 1943, after a successful audition, Neville gained his place at the prestigious drama school, the Royal Academy of Dramatic Art.

Shortly afterwards, aged nearly 18, Neville was called up and drafted to serve as a signalman in the Royal Navy during World War II, where he stayed for three years, serving on HMS Scotia, HMS Relentless, HMS Malaya and the RFA Arndale travelling between Australia, the Philippines and Hong Kong. It was only upon being demobbed and being able to claim his Ex-Serviceman's Grant and still being able to live at home in London that he was able to begin studying at RADA in Gower Street and train as an actor in 1946. It was whilst studying at the school, that any remnants of his East End accent were replaced by the Received Pronunciation, which was the fashion at that time within the profession. Fellow students at the time included Barbara Jefford, Robert Shaw, Paul Daneman and Peter Sallis.

In late Spring of 1947, and still a student, Neville made his West End stage debut with the Old Vic company, as a walk on in 'Richard II' with Alec Guinness as the King at the New Theatre, due to the Old Vic Theatre being severely bomb damaged.

== Career ==
=== Early career: Repertory ===
One of Neville's first jobs upon leaving drama school was in the Regent's Park Open Air Theatre, where he had been engaged for a summer season by Robert Atkins, lord of Regent's Park. The season included The Ambassador in King John, the first lord in As You Like It and Lysander in The Merchant of Venice.

In 1948, Neville's agent found him work at the Lowestoft Playhouse working in weekly rep where he stayed for three months. However, it was in January 1949 that he soon moved to the prestigious Birmingham Repertory Company, then located in Station Street, under the pioneering leadership of Sir Barry Jackson. During his time in the city, Neville lived in the leafy town of Sutton Coldfield. Amongst the company of actors were Douglas Campbell, Eric Porter, Donald Pleasence and Caroline Hooper. A holiday to France with Hooper soon developed into a relationship, with Neville proposing to Caroline at the end of September and getting married before Christmas at St Mary's Church, Moseley with Eric Porter as best man. The couple left in 1950, returning to London and buying a home in the Wood Green area.

Neville was then offered the chance by Denis Carey to work at the Bristol Old Vic in their repertory company, where he won acclaim for playing Marlow in She Stoops to Conquer, the Duke in Measure for Measure, the title role in Henry V, Slim in Of Mice and Men, and PC Tom Blenkinsop in the actor's first stage musical, Christmas in King Street. He left the Bristol Old Vic in 1952.

=== The Old Vic ===
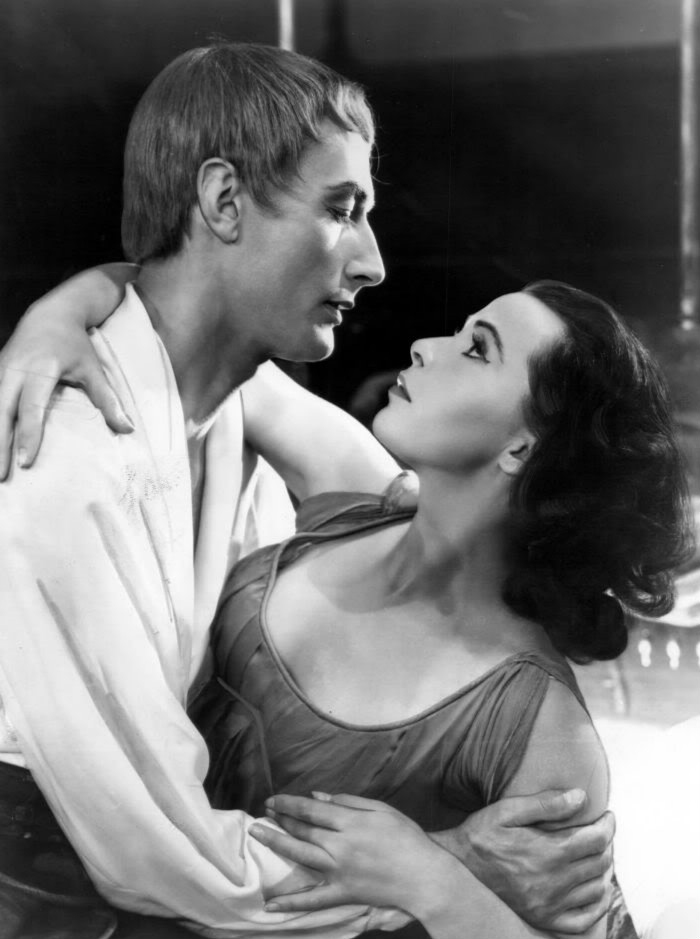
Neville and Claire Bloom in Romeo and Juliet, 1957

Fortuitously, soon after Neville arrived in 1953, the Old Vic, under the directorship of Michael Benthall, decided to stage all of Shakespeare's plays in five years. In his first official season, Neville was cast as King Henry V and then not long after, as Fortinbras opposite Richard Burton who was playing Hamlet for the first time. This was soon followed up with Bertram in All's Well That Ends Well and then the Dauphin in King John.

By 1954, having now played Macduff opposite Paul Rogers's Macbeth and Berowne in Love's Labour's Lost, Neville took the lead role of King Richard II in an acclaimed production of Richard II where, on the first night, he received a record of 23 curtain calls, with Virginia McKenna as his Queen Anne. By now, Neville had established himself as a matinee idol and a West End star of the 1950s, later hailed as "one of the most potent classical actors of the Richard Burton–Peter O'Toole generation".

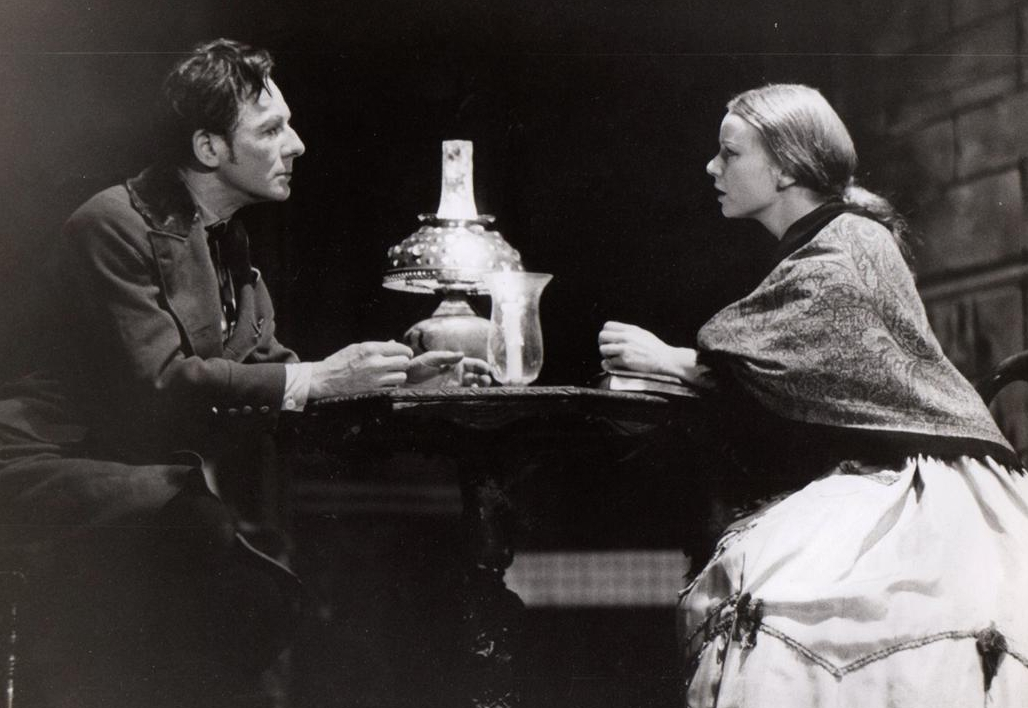
A young Gielgud (L) whom Neville was often compared to vocally and physically

In a pre-Beatles age, Neville, according to The Times had, "Alongside Richard Burton, achieved a kind of romantic superstardom in Shakespeare unfamiliar since the prewar times of Olivier and (in America) John Barrymore)". In 1956, he and Burton famously alternated the parts of Othello and Iago in Othello. Further parts that season included Troilus (and later Thersites) in Troilus and Cressida directed by Tyrone Guthrie and as Romeo in Romeo and Juliet, directed by Robert Helpmann, with his Juliet being played by Claire Bloom. He later reprised the role of Romeo on American television for the anthology series Producers' Showcase).

In the final season of the five-year plan at the Old Vic, Neville played the part of Hamlet, with Judi Dench as his Ophelia, in what was her first professional performance after leaving drama school. This was followed up by Angelo in Measure for Measure and Sir Andrew Aguecheek in Twelfth Night. The productions of Hamlet and Twelfth Night toured Paris, Belgrade, Zagreb, Ljubljana, the United States and Canada. The visit to Canada would be Neville's first introduction to the country he would later call home years later.

During his time at the Old Vic, the young Neville was known for his classical good looks and mellifluous voice, and regularly described as John Gielgud's natural successor; this was a comparison Neville later revealed to Gielgud's biographer Jonathan Croall he hated.

In 1959, for a while, Neville took over the leading role of Nestor Le Fripé from Keith Michell in the original West End production of the musical Irma La Douce, with Elizabeth Seal as Irma. He later played the title role in Macbeth at the Nottingham Playhouse, directed by Peter Dews. He returned to the London stage for a brief period in 1963, playing the title role in Alfie by Bill Naughton, but by then his theatrical commitment lay outside London.

=== Nottingham Playhouse ===
In 1961, with Neville's weekly pay declining from £200 to £50, he joined the Nottingham Playhouse, becoming joint artistic director with Frank Dunlop and Peter Ustinov when the current Playhouse opened in 1963. It became one of Britain's leading regional repertory theatres. Though Dunlop and Ustinov soon left, Neville remained at the theatre until 1967, when he resigned over funding disputes with the local authority and the Arts Council.

Director Richard Eyre once recalled that:

Peter Brook opened my eyes to the possibilities of the theatre as an art, but John Neville made me see the attractions of a life in the theatre. When I did my first production (at the Phoenix theatre, Leicester) he was there (with Judi Dench). The next day he offered me a job directing a school's production at Nottingham Playhouse. It was there that I saw him play Richard II, and it still remains one of the best Shakespearean performances I've ever seen—beautifully orchestrated, exquisitely spoken, wholly authoritative.

Neville starred as the Duke of Marlborough in the BBC2 serial The First Churchills (1969), a major television role which also maintained his international profile when the show was broadcast as the very first Masterpiece Theatre series in the United States in 1971. He received good reviews in the musical adaptation of Lolita, called Lolita, My Love, which closed in Boston.

=== Move to Canada ===
With his family, Neville left Britain for Canada in 1972, becoming a citizen there. He devoted his later career to the Canadian theatre. He took up the post of artistic director at the Citadel Theatre in Edmonton, Alberta (1973–78), and later took similar positions with the Neptune Theatre in Halifax, Nova Scotia (1978–83) and other Canadian theatre companies, including as artistic director of the Stratford Festival of Canada from 1985 to 1989, while continuing his acting career. On top of his artistic decisions, Neville helped eliminate the Neptune's deficit with canny promotions, such as giving free tickets to the local taxi drivers and their families, correctly anticipating that recipients would enthusiastically discuss the theatre with passengers and tourists.

Director Terry Gilliam cast Neville as the lead in The Adventures of Baron Munchausen (1988). In the film, Neville plays the character at three different stages of his life; in his 30s, his 50s and his 70s. From 1995 to 1998, Neville had a prominent recurring role in The X-Files television series as the Well-Manicured Man, and in 1998, he reprised the role in the feature film, The X-Files. Although he made numerous other television appearances and occasional film roles, the main focus of Neville's career was always on the theatre.

In his later years, Neville had numerous cameo appearances in films, including primate of the Anglican Church in Australia in The Man Who Sued God and an admiral in the Earth Space Navy in The Fifth Element. He had a small role as Terrence in David Cronenberg's Spider (2002). Around the same time, he appeared with Vanessa Redgrave in the film adaptation of Crime and Punishment (also 2002).

In 2003, Neville performed a stage reading of John Milton's Samson Agonistes, with Claire Bloom at Bryn Mawr College at the behest of poet Karl Kirchwey. He appeared in an episode of the soap opera Train 48 (2005) as the grandfather of Zach Eisler, who was played by his grandson Joe Dinicol.

Neville was appointed a Member of the Order of Canada in 2006.

== Personal life ==
The Nevilles' first child, Sarah, was born in October 1950 and their son Stephen in February 1952. In December 1952 they adopted an eight-month-old child called Matthew. It was whilst playing Othello in 1956 that his daughter Emma was born, with Richard Burton announcing the news to the audience at the curtain call. Ten days later the adoption agency called informing them that there was another child up for adoption, Rachel. The Nevilles' youngest child was Thomas.

Eyre later recalled in an obituary that "John was tall, aquiline, a natural aristocrat with feline grace who disguised well the roaring boy underneath...John was infectiously anarchic—wild, larky and raffish as well as supremely skillful as an actor and inspiring as the leader of a company. He took me under his wing and, for a time, I was his drinking and theatre-going companion. I was with him when I saw the Berliner Ensemble in Coriolanus, Arturo Ui and The Days of the Commune. I was overwhelmed by the productions, even more so when John took me backstage at the Old Vic to meet Helene Weigel (Brecht's widow) and Ekkehard Schall (Coriolanus). I felt I was in the company of gods. John was part of my luck and I've missed him for years."

Neville's grandson is the actor Joe Dinicol.

== Death ==
According to publicists at Canada's Stratford Shakespeare Festival, Neville died "peacefully surrounded by family" on 19 November 2011, aged 86. He had Alzheimer's disease in his later years. He was survived by his wife Caroline (née Hooper) and their six children.

== Theatre credits ==
Year	Play title	Role	Theatre	Notes
1948 Jun	As You Like It	First Lord	Regent's Park Open Air Theatre	Professional stage debut
1948 Jul	King John	Châtillon	Regent's Park Open Air Theatre	
1948 Jul	A Midsummer Night's Dream	Lysander	Regent's Park Open Air Theatre	
1948 Aug	Justice	Hector Frome	-	RADA tour in Norway
1948 Nov	Truant in Park Lane	The Earl of Lyndon	Lowestoft Playhouse	First season with the Lowestoft Repertory Company
1948 Nov	London Wall	Hec Hammond	Lowestoft Playhouse	
1948 Nov	Jane Eyre	St John Rivers	Lowestoft Playhouse	
1948 Dec	Present Laughter	Roland Maule	Lowestoft Playhouse	
1948 Dec	Power Without Glory	Eddie Lord	Lowestoft Playhouse	
1948 Dec	The Magic Cupboard	Bill Summertop	Lowestoft Playhouse	
1948 Dec	Christmas Shot Revue	Various Parts	Lowestoft Playhouse	
1949 Jan	Eden End	Geoffrey Farrant	Lowestoft Playhouse	
1949 Jan	Is Life Worth Living	Eddie Twohig	Lowestoft Playhouse	
1949 Jan	The Eagle Has Two Heads	Stanislas	Lowestoft Playhouse	

== Select filmography ==
=== Film ===
Year	Title	Role	Notes
1960	Oscar Wilde	Lord Alfred Douglas	
1961	Mr. Topaze	Roger de Bersac	
1962	Billy Budd	Julian Radcliffe, Second Lieutenant	
1963	Unearthly Stranger	Dr. Mark Davidson	
1965	A Study in Terror	Sherlock Holmes	
1970	The Adventures of Gerard	Wellington	
1988	The Adventures of Baron Munchausen	Baron Munchausen	
1994	Baby's Day Out	Mr. Andrews	
1994	The Road to Wellville	Endymion Hart-Jones	
1994	Little Women	Mr. Laurence	
1995	Dangerous Minds	Waiter	
1996	Sabotage	Prof. Follenfant	
1996	Swann	Cruzzi	
1996	High School High	Thaddeus Clark	
1997	The Fifth Element	General Staedert	
1997	Regeneration	Dr. Yealland	
1997	Dinner at Fred's	Uncle Henrick	
1997	My Teacher Ate My Homework	Shopkeeper	
1998	Goodbye Lover	Bradley	
1998	The X-Files	The Well-Manicured Man	
1998	Urban Legend	Dean Adams	
1999	Water Damage	Jock Beale	
1999	Sunshine	Gustave Sors	
1999	The Duke	the Duke	
2001	Harvard Man	Dr. Reese	
2002	Time of the Wolf	Preacher	
2002	Spider	Terrence	
2002	Crime and Punishment	Marmeladov, Sonia's alcoholic father	
2002	Between Strangers	Orson Stewart	
2003	Moving Malcolm	Malcolm Woodward	
2003	Hollywood North	Henry Neville	
2003	The Statement	Old Man	
2004	White Knuckles	Narrator (voice)	
2005	Separate Lies	Lord Rawston	
2006	The Tragic Story of Nling	Donkey	Short film

=== Television ===
Year	Title	Role	Notes
1968	Shaggy Dog	Wilkie	TV series
1971	Boswell's Life of Johnson	David Garrick	TV movie
1971	The Rivals of Sherlock Holmes	Dr Thorndyke	TV series
1979	Reil	General Garnet Wolseley	TV movie
1993	Journey to the Center of the Earth	Dr. Cecil Chambers	TV movie
1993	Star Trek: The Next Generation	Sir Isaac Newton	TV series, season six, episode 26: "Descent"
1993	Dieppe	Gen. Sir Alan Brooke	TV movie
1993	Stark	De Quincy	TV mini-series
1995	The Song Spinner	Frilo, the Magnificent	TV movie
1995–1998	The X-Files	The Well-Manicured Man	TV series, 8 episodes
1996	Adventures of Smoke Bellew AKA Chercheurs d'or	Dwight Sanderson	TV mini-series
1997	Time to Say Goodbye?	Michigan Judge	TV movie
1997	Johnny 2.0	Bosch	TV movie
1998–2000	Emily of New Moon	Uncle Malcolm	TV series
2000	Bonhoeffer: Agent of Grace	Bishop George Bell	TV movie
2000	Custody of the Heart	Judge H. Chadwick	TV movie
2002	The Stork Derby	Mr. Cunningham	TV movie
2002	Trudeau	British High Commissioner	TV movie
2002	Escape from the Newsroom	George's Father	TV movie
2003	Control Factor	Director	TV movie
2003	Rolie Polie Olie	Klanky Klaus	TV series, 1 episode
2007	Friends and Heroes	Claxus	Animated series, voice only - 4 episodes

== Television credits ==
- Half Hour Story (1967) – Man – (episode: 'George's Room') – (Director Alan Clarke with Geraldine Moffat)
