= Alfie (2004 film) =

2004 film by Charles Shyer

- Theatrical release poster
- Directed by: Charles Shyer
- Screenplay by: Elaine Pope; Charles Shyer
- Based on: Alfie by Bill Naughton
- Produced by: Charles Shyer; Elaine Pope
- Starring: Jude Law; Marisa Tomei; Omar Epps; Nia Long; Jane Krakowski; Sienna Miller; Susan Sarandon
- Cinematography: Ashley Rowe
- Edited by: Padraic McKinley
- Music by: Mick Jagger; Dave Stewart; John Powell
- Production company: Paramount Pictures
- Distributed by: Paramount Pictures (United States); United International Pictures (United Kingdom)
- Release dates: October 22, 2004 (United Kingdom); November 5, 2004 (United States)
- Running time: 105 minutes
- Countries: United Kingdom; United States
- Language: English
- Budget: $60 million
- Box office: $35.1 million

Alfie is a 2004 romantic comedy-drama film inspired by the 1966 British film of the same name and its 1975 sequel, starring Jude Law as the title character, originally played by Michael Caine in the 1966 film and Alan Price in the 1975 sequel. The film was co-written, directed, and produced by Charles Shyer, the last feature film he directed to be theatrically released.

Alfie was released by United International Pictures in the United Kingdom on October 22, 2004 and by Paramount Pictures in the United States on November 5, 2004. The film received mixed reviews from critics and was a box office bomb, grossing $35.1 million against a $60 million budget.

== Plot ==
Alfie Elkins is a Cockney limo driver living in Manhattan. A sex addict, he regularly has one-night stands with numerous women. In addition, he maintains a casual relationship with single mother Julie, his "semi-regular-quasi-sort-of-girlfriend thing," and unhappily married Dorie. Once Dorie wants more than casual sex, he stops calling.

Alfie and his coworker and best friend Marlon want to open a company together, but Marlon needs to get back with his ex, Lonette. When Alfie goes to put in a good word for him, he finds her at her bar. But after getting drunk, they have sex. Alfie meets Marlon the next day, terrified he knows about it, but is relieved when Marlon says he and Lonette got back together and are getting married.

When Alfie goes to Julie's for a booty call, she immediately asks him to leave, confronting him as she had discovered Dorie's underwear in her rubbish bin—he had discarded them after finding them in his pocket. Intending to reconcile with her on her son's birthday, Alfie sees Julie has returned to her estranged husband. He later discovers Lonette is pregnant with his child, and (without telling Marlon) they go to a clinic for an abortion. Soon afterward, Marlon and Lonette unexpectedly move upstate, without saying goodbye.

Following repeated failures to achieve an erection, Alfie sees a doctor, who tells him he is perfectly healthy, and his impotence is due to stress. However, he finds a lump on Alfie's penis. They immediately run a test at the clinic and he spends a few anxious days awaiting the results. On a trip to the hospital, Alfie meets Joe, a widower, in the bathroom. Joe gives life advice to the depressed Alfie: "Find somebody to love, and live every day like it's your last". Soon afterward, Alfie finds out he's cancer-free.

Believing he's been given a second chance, Alfie decides to "aim higher" in his love life. He meets Nikki, a beautiful but unstable woman, and they quickly embark on a passionate, turbulent relationship. Moving in together, Alfie finds it hard to put up with her mood swings, especially after she goes off her medication. Distancing himself, he focuses on an older woman, Liz. A sultry cosmetics mogul, she inspires him to "aim higher". He becomes infatuated, but she wants to keep it strictly sexual. Alfie then ends it with Nikki.

Running into Julie in a coffee shop, Alfie realizes he has feelings for her; however, she's now with someone else. On a trip upstate to visit Marlon and his now-wife, Lonette, she reveals she never had the abortion, and, Marlon knows Alfie is the father, but nonetheless decided to stay. Upon seeing Marlon with hurt in his eyes, Alfie visits Joe, who tells him to get his life together. Alfie turns to Liz for comfort but is crushed that she has an even younger man in her life.

Alfie has a chance meeting with Dorie late one night. As he tries to get back into her life, she wants no part of him. Apologizing for not calling, he admits he has trouble expressing himself, running from relationships when they become too serious. She wishes him luck. The film ends with Alfie breaking the fourth wall and reflecting on his life, how he lacks peace of mind and finally asking the question, "What's it all about?"

== Cast ==
- Jude Law as Alfie Elkins Jr.
- Marisa Tomei as Julie
- Susan Sarandon as Liz
- Renée Taylor as Lu Schnitman
- Jane Krakowski as Dorie
- Jeff Harding as Phil
- Kevin Rahm as Terry
- Omar Epps as Marlon
- Nia Long as Lonette
- Max Morris as Max
- Jefferson Mays as Dr. Miranda Kulp
- Dick Latessa as Joe
- Sienna Miller as Nikki
- Gedde Watanabe as Wing
- Yo Lang as Mrs. Wing
- Paul Brooke as Flower Shop Proprietor
- Sondra James as Mrs. Liberman

A black and white photograph of Michael Caine representing Alfie Elkins Sr. appears during the film's credits.

== Production ==
The film was shot throughout England, with locations doubling for New York City, along with on-set shooting in Manhattan. England locations included Liverpool, Manchester, and Port of Tilbury (some dock scenes). New York City locations featured Park Avenue and the Waldorf-Astoria Hotel.

== Music ==
The music score was composed by Mick Jagger, Dave Stewart and John Powell, featuring 13 original songs and a remake of the original 1966 title song. Further songs are by Wyclef Jean and The Isley Brothers.

For the song "Old Habits Die Hard", Jagger and Stewart won the BFCA Award, the Golden Globe, a Sierra Award, and the World Soundtrack Award.

== Reception ==
=== Box office ===
Alfie grossed $13,399,812 in the US and $21,750,734 in other countries for a worldwide total of $35,150,546 on a $60 million budget. The film opened on November 5, 2004, in the United States and grossed $2,206,738 on the first day. That weekend, the film was #5 in the box office with $6,218,335 behind The Incredibles' opening weekend, Ray's second, The Grudge's third, and Saw's second. When compared to its $60 million budget, Alfie was a box office bomb.

=== Critical response ===
Alfie received mixed reviews. On the review aggregator website Rotten Tomatoes, the film holds an approval rating of 48% based on 152 reviews, with an average rating of 5.5/10. The website's critics consensus reads, "This unnecessary remake wants Alfie to have his cake and eat it, too, but a lack of sexual fizz and a sour performance by Jude Law conspire to deliver audiences a romantic comedy that isn't romantic or funny." Metacritic, which uses a weighted average, assigned the film a score of 49 out of 100, based on 35 critics, indicating "mixed or average" reviews. Audiences polled by CinemaScore gave the film an average grade of "C+" on an A+ to F scale.

Todd McCarthy from Variety describes the film as "a breezy, sexy romp with a conscience that reflects in obvious but interesting ways on societal changes over the intervening 38 years."

Roger Ebert enjoyed the film, praising Law's performance and saying that "on its own terms, it's funny at times and finally sad and sweet."

Entertainment Weekly gave the film a "B−", praising the actresses and Law, but also noting "Jude Law would appear to have all the attributes of a movie star: looks, humor, rogue charm. Yet there's one he could use more of — an anger that might ignite his smooth presence."

Manohla Dargis of The New York Times stated:

Unlike the 1966 British film on which it is based, with its abrasive star-making turn from Michael Caine, the new Alfie doesn't chase social significance – it just wants us to have a good time. The story's observations about male behavior aren't earth shattering...but what gives it its kick is how Alfie takes the film audience into his confidence. In both films, the character talks directly into the camera, a disarming strategy that brings us closer to this serial seducer than we might want. Playing narrator turns Alfie into a tour guide and something of his own defense attorney; it also means he has to enrapture the audience along with his conquests.

In 2024, Law expressed dissatisfaction with the film, "I was in a really strong position [at that time] because I'd just had another [Oscar] nomination on the back of Cold Mountain, and for Alfie to be the film I chose to do quite soon after that, I think was a bad move." Law also felt that the film "was made for too much money" and that he "was probably paid too much money, which I underestimated at the time."
