= How Green Was My Valley (1960 TV series) =

British historical television drama series

- Genre: Historical drama
- Based on: How Green Was My Valley by Richard Llewellyn
- Written by: Barry Thomas
- Directed by: Dafydd Gruffydd
- Starring: Eynon Evans; Rachel Thomas; Glyn Houston
- Country of origin: United Kingdom
- Original language: English
- No. of series: 1
- No. of episodes: 8

Production
- Producer: Dafydd Gruffydd
- Running time: 30 minutes
- Production company: BBC

Original release
- Network: BBC Television
- Release: 1 January – 19 February 1960

How Green Was My Valley is a British historical television drama series which was originally broadcast by the BBC in eight parts during 1960. It is an adaptation of the 1939 novel How Green Was My Valley by Richard Llewellyn, set in a Welsh coal-mining community.

== Cast ==
- Eynon Evans as Gwilym Morgan Sr. (8 episodes)
- Rachel Thomas as Beth Morgan (8 episodes)
- Glyn Houston as Davy Morgan (7 episodes)
- William Squire as Rev. Merddyn Gruffydd (7 episodes)
- Sulwen Morgan as Angharad Morgan (6 episodes)
- Margaret John as Bronwen Morgan (5 episodes)
- Henley Thomas as Huw Morgan (4 episodes)
- Islwyn Evans as Huw Morgan (4 episodes)
- Anita Morgan as Ceinwen Phillips (4 episodes)
- Michael Forrest as Dai Bando (4 episodes)
- Hugh David as Owen Morgan (3 episodes)
- Emrys James as Gwilym Morgan Jr. (3 episodes)
- David Lyn as Ivor Morgan (3 episodes)

== Bibliography ==
- Ellen Baskin. Serials on British Television, 1950-1994. Scolar Press, 1996.
