= Margaret Courtenay (actress) =

Welsh actress (1923–1996)

- Publicity still c.1986
- Born: Margaret Courtenay; 14 November 1923; Cardiff, Glamorgan, Wales
- Died: 15 February 1996 (aged 72); Northwood, London, England
- Education: London Academy of Music and Dramatic Art
- Occupation: Actress
- Years active: 1930–1996
- Spouse: Ivan Pinfield (m. 1947–1968)
- Children: 1

Margaret Courtenay (14 November 1923 – 15 February 1996) was a British actress best known for her British theatre roles during the 1970s and 1980s. She was a member of the Royal Shakespeare Company.

Born in Wales to a travelling agriculture salesman, she started acting when she was seven in 1930 in a production of The Trojan Women at Cardiff Little Theatre, where her mother acted. She attended Whitchurch Grammar School and then London Academy of Music and Dramatic Art.

In 1976, Courtenay won the Laurence Olivier Award for Supporting Artist of the Year for her stage role in the play Separate Tables, by author Terence Rattigan, directed by Michael Blakemore, at the Apollo Theatre in London's West End.

In 1991, Courtenay starred in the radio show ' The Secret Life of Rosewood Avenue '.

She was married to Ivan Pinfield and had a son before divorcing. Courtenay retired at Denville Hall, a retirement home for professional actors set in Northwood in the London Borough of Hillingdon. She died of cancer on 15 February 1996 at age 72.

== Stage work ==
Year	Title	Role	Director	Notes
1949	A Midsummer Night's Dream	Titania		St Martin's Theatre, West End, London.
1954	A Midsummer Night's Dream	Hippolyta	Michael Benthall	Metropolitan Opera House, Broadway, New York City.
1956	Romeo and Juliet	Lady Capulet	Robert Helpmann	Winter Garden Theatre, Broadway, New York City.
1956	Troilus and Cressida	Cassandra	Elizabeth Butterfield	Winter Garden Theatre, Broadway, New York City.
1958	Hamlet	Gertrude	Michael Benthall	Broadway Theatre, Broadway, New York City.
1958	King Henry V	Queen Isabel	Michael Benthall	Broadway Theatre, Broadway, New York City.
1961–1962	The Lady of the Camellias		Robert Helpmann	Old Vic Overseas Tour (12 July 1961 to 17 March 1962) : Australia and New Zealand. Starring Vivien Leigh in title role.
1962	The Lady of the Camellias		Robert Helpmann	Old Vic Overseas Tour (29 March 1962 to 16 May 1962) : Latin America. Starring Vivien Leigh in title role.
1964	King Lear	Cordelia		Royal Shakespeare Company (European/US Tour)
1964	Alfie !	Ruby	Gilchrist Calder	Morosco Theatre, Broadway, New York City.
1969	Mame	Vera Charles	Lawrence Kasha	The musical starred Ginger Rogers in title role, and ran for 14 months at the Royal Drury Lane Theatre (West End, London), with a special performance for Queen Elizabeth II.
1971	Ambassador	Amelia Newsome	Stone Widney	Musical starring Howard Keel and Danielle Darrieux. It premiered on 19 October 1971, at Her Majesty's Theatre (West End, London).
1971	Separate Tables	Mrs Railton-Bell	Michael Blakemore	At the Apollo Theatre, London, with John Mills, Jill Bennett and Raymond Huntley. 1976 : Laurence Olivier Award for Supporting Artist of the Year.
1972	Macbeth	Lady Macbeth		Old Vic Theatre, London.
1973	Habeas Corpus	Muriel Wicksteed		A comedy stage play first performed at the Lyric Theatre (West End, London), with Alec Guinness and Margaret Courtenay in the lead roles.
1981	Cards on the Table	Ariadne Oliver	Peter Dews	Adapted to the stage by Leslie Darbon from Agatha Christie's novel, at the Vaudeville Theatre in 1981.
1984	42nd Street	Maggie Jones	Gower Champion	Musical that premiered on 8 August 1984, at the Royal Drury Lane Theatre (West End, London).
1987	Who's Afraid of Virginia Woolf?			Aldwych Theatre, London.
1987	Follies	Hattie Walker	Mike Ockrent	London revival, starring Diana Rigg, which ran for 644 performances at the Shaftesbury Theatre (West End, London).
1988	The Musical Comedy murders of 1940	Elsa von Grossenkneuten	Peter Fargo	A John Bishop comedy spoof, that premiered at the Greenwich Theatre, London.
1990	Look Look		Michael Frayn	
1990	Show Boat	Parthy Ann Hawks	Ian Judge	A Royal Shakespeare Company revival, at the London Palladium (West End, London).

== Filmography ==
=== Film ===
Year	Title	Role	Director	Notes
1955	Touch and Go	Secretary	Michael Truman	
1968	Hot Millions	Mrs. Hubbard	Eric Till	Uncredited, A crime fiction filmed at MGM-British Studios, and starring Peter Ustinov and Maggie Smith.
1968	Isadora	Raucous Woman	Karel Reisz	Uncredited, A biographical film telling the story of American dancer Isadora Duncan. It stars Vanessa Redgrave, James Fox and Jason Robards.
1969	Arthur? Arthur!	Samuel Gallu	Clare Brownjohn	
1972	Under Milk Wood	Mrs. Waldo	Andrew Sinclair	A British film starring Richard Burton, Elizabeth Taylor and Peter O'Toole.
1972	Ooh… You Are Awful	W.P.O.	Cliff Owen	
1975	Royal Flash	Dutchess Irma	Richard Lester	Starring Malcolm McDowell as Flashman.
1976	The Incredible Sarah	Madame Nathalie	Richard Fleischer	A British drama film starring Glenda Jackson portraying Sarah Bernhardt.
1980	Oh! Heavenly Dog	Lady Chalmers	Joe Camp	A comedy film released by 20th Century Fox, starring Chevy Chase, Jane Seymour and Omar Sharif.
1980	The Mirror Crack'd	Mrs Dolly Bantry	Guy Hamilton	An all stars cast, namely Angela Lansbury, Kim Novak, Elizabeth Taylor, Geraldine Chaplin, Tony Curtis and Rock Hudson.
1986	Duet for One	Sonia Randvich	Andrei Konchalovsky	A British film starring Julie Andrews and Alan Bates.

=== Television ===
Year	Title	Role	Director	Notes
1963	The House Under the Water	Lucrezia Tregaron	Dafydd Gruffydd	Eight episodes, aired on BBC1
1971	Bel Ami	Madame Walter	John Davies	5 episodes aired on BBC 2
1974	Thriller	Claire	John Sichel	Season 3, Episode 1: "A Coffin for the Bride" originally broadcast on ITV starring Michael Jayston and Helen Mirren
1978	Mind Your Language	Miss Hardacre	Vince Powell	Season 1, Episode 6: "Come Back All Is Forgiven " originally broadcast on ITV starring Barry Evans and Zara Nutley
1980	Only When I Laugh	Mrs. Binns	Vernon Lawrence	Season 2, Episode 5: "The Visitors" originally broadcast on ITV and starring James Bolam, Peter Bowles and Christopher Strauli.
1981	Winston Churchill: The Wilderness Years	Maxine Elliott	Ferdinand Fairfax	An 8-part drama Miniseries, originally broadcast on ITV, and starring Robert Hardy in the title role.
1983	Don't Wait Up	Lady Cranbourne	Harold Snoad	A British sitcom, aired on BBC1, and starring Nigel Havers, Tony Britton and Dinah Sheridan.
1983–87	Never the Twain	Lady Deveraux	Peter Frazer-Jones, Robert Reed	A British sitcom, created by Thames Television for the ITV network.
1984	Fresh Fields	Margaret Richardson	Peter Frazer-Jones	A British sitcom starring Julia McKenzie and Anton Rodgers.
1986	Paradise Postponed	Lady Naboth	Alvin Rakoff	A TV serial based on a novel by John Mortimer.
1986	Executive Stress	Shirley Lee Sheffield	John Howard Davies	A British sitcom, aired on ITV, and starring Penelope Keith.
1987	The Two Mrs. Grenvilles	Madame Sophia	John Erman	A NBC television miniseries, starring Ann-Margret and Claudette Colbert.
1987	Vanity Fair	Miss Pinkerton	Diarmuid Lawrence	A BBC Pebble Mill production set in the time of the Napoleonic Wars.
1992	The Mirror Crack'd from Side to Side	Miss Knight	Norman Stone	The 12th episode of BBC's series Miss Marple, starring Joan Hickson as Jane Marple.
1994	The House Of Windsor	Lady Sharpcott	Graeme Harper	6 episodes, aired on ITV
