= Gertrude Wagner =

Austrian sociologist, economist and socialist (1907–1992)

- Born: Gertrud Aloysia Höltei; 13 December 1907; Görz, Austrian Littoral, Austria-Hungary
- Died: 23 June 1992 (aged 84); Vienna, Austria
- Education: University of Vienna; University of London
- Occupations: Sociologist; Economist
- Spouse: Ludwig Wagner (m. 1931; died 1938)
- Partner: Bill Naughton

Gertrude Aloysia Wagner (née Gertrud Aloysia Höltei; 13 December 1907 – 23 June 1992) was an Austrian sociologist, economist and socialist, known for her involvement in the Marienthal Study and the Mass-Observation Worktown study of Bolton.

== Early life and education ==
Wagner was born Gertrud Aloysia Höltei on 13 December 1907 in Görz, Austrian Littoral (present-day Gorizia, Italy) to Jakob Höltei (1871–c. 1942), a railway engineer and court councillor, and Stefanie Höltei (1881–c. 1944). Raised in Tarvis, Hieflau and Villach, Höltei settled in Vienna in 1923. Joining the Association of Socialist Secondary School Students, Höltei met Marie Jahoda and Paul Lazarsfeld.

Studying law and political science at the University of Vienna from 1926 to 1930, Höltei joined the Social Democratic Workers Party (SDAPÖ) as a student. In 1931, Höltei graduated with a doctorate of law and married Ludwig Wagner, a journalist, economist and fellow member of SDAPÖ. Living separately from around 1934 onwards, the marriage was officially dissolved in 1938 by the National Socialists.

== Career ==
Following graduation, Wagner first worked under Lazarsfeld at the Austrian Economic Psychology Research Centre. A member of the Marienthal Study project team, Wagner most likely worked as a project administrator and data analyst. With Lazarsfeld unable to return to Austria, Wagner served as the Center's scientific director alongside Jahoda from 1934 to 1935. (Note: Also cited as 1935.) Wagner also worked as a social worker at the Kinderübernahmestelle from 1932 to 1935.

Leaving Austria, Wagner arrived in Great Britain as refugee in February 1936. Wagner studied sociology and psychology at the University of London, and became known by the anglicised "Gertrude". In July 1938, Wagner arrived in Bolton to work on Mass-Observation (MO) Worktown study.. Wagner's work was aided by the MO observer Bill Naughton, a coal driver and later writer. Naughton's insights as a coal driver played a key role in providing information about the families he visited for Wagner's studies on the emotional substructure of working class life. During the study Naughton and Wagner began an affair. (Note: According to a 1978 interview with Dennis Chapman, Naughton and Wagner had several children.)

Wagner received her PhD in sociology in 1939, and her Master's in psychology in 1940. Returning to Vienna in May 1948, Wagner joined the Social Democratic Party the following year. Initially working at Länderbank, Wagner began working an assistant for the sociology department at the Institute for Advanced Studies.

== Personal life ==
Both of Wagner's parents died during the Holocaust; her father at Theresienstadt Ghetto around 1942 and her mother at Auschwitz around 1944.

On 23 June 1992, Wagner died in Vienna aged 84.
