= Spring and Port Wine =

1959 stage play by Bill Naughton

- Written by: Bill Naughton
- Based on: radio & television play My Flesh My Blood by Naughton
- Setting: Bolton

Premiere
- Date premiered: 1959

Spring and Port Wine is a 1959 stage play by Bill Naughton. The drama is set in Bolton and concerns the Crompton family, especially Rafe, the father, and his attempts to assert his authority in the household as his children grow up.

== Background ==
The original version, My Flesh, My Blood, was a BBC radio play broadcast on 17 August 1957 in the Saturday Night Theatre series. By April 1958, a version for BBC Television had been broadcast and, in October 1959, a stage adaptation was presented at the Bolton Hippodrome.

Retitled Spring and Port Wine, the play was first produced in Birmingham prior to opening at London's Mermaid Theatre in November 1965, with Alfred Marks (as Rafe), Ruth Dunning (as Daisy), John Alderton (as Harold), Jennifer Wilson (as Florence), Jan Carey (as Hilda), Ray Mort (as Arthur), Gretchen Franklin (as Betsy Jane) and Melvyn Hayes (as Wilfred) in the cast. It was produced by Allan Davis and Michael Medwin, in association with the Mermaid Theatre Trust; Davis was also the director.

In January 1966, the production transferred to the Apollo Theatre in the West End, subsequently moving to the New Theatre in July 1967 and then St Martin's Theatre in June 1968. It achieved a West End run of 1,236 performances. Alfred Marks, meanwhile, had left the cast and from 1967 to 1968 played the lead role of Rafe in an Australian tour.

Davis was also the director. Medwin produced the play through a company he had formed with Albert Finney, Memorial Enterprises. Finney was an early investor in the play and only commitments to the National Theatre meant he did not act in it.

== Adaptations ==
The play was adapted (by N. Richard Nash, who was uncredited) to a setting in the United States under the title Keep It in the Family, which ran on Broadway at the Plymouth Theatre for five performances in September 1967. The play was profiled in the William Goldman book The Season: A Candid Look at Broadway.

The play was turned into a 1970 film.

After the film version, Naughton's play returned to its radio roots no fewer than three times, featuring in the BBC's Afternoon Theatre strand in August 1975, July 1979 and July 1982.
