= Alfie (1966 film) =

1966 film by Lewis Gilbert

- Theatrical release poster
- Directed by: Lewis Gilbert
- Screenplay by: Bill Naughton
- Based on: Alfie by Bill Naughton
- Produced by: Lewis Gilbert
- Starring: Michael Caine; Millicent Martin; Julia Foster; Jane Asher; Shirley Anne Field; Vivien Merchant; Eleanor Bron; Shelley Winters
- Cinematography: Otto Heller
- Edited by: Thelma Connell
- Music by: Sonny Rollins
- Production company: Sheldrake Films
- Distributed by: Paramount Pictures
- Release date: 24 March 1966
- Running time: 114 minutes
- Country: United Kingdom
- Language: English
- Budget: $500,000
- Box office: $18.9 million

Alfie is a 1966 British comedy-drama film produced and directed by Lewis Gilbert and starring Michael Caine. The Paramount Pictures release was adapted by Bill Naughton from his 1963 play. Following its premiere at the Plaza Theatre in the West End of London on 24 March 1966, the film became a box-office success, enjoying critical acclaim, and influencing British cinema.

The plot follows a young, womanising man leading a self-centred life, focused on his own enjoyment until events force him to question his uncaring behaviour, his loneliness, and his priorities. Alfie cheats on numerous women, treating them with disrespect, using them for sex and domestic affairs. He frequently breaks the fourth wall, speaking directly to the camera, narrating and justifying his actions, despite broad contradictions.

== Plot ==
Alfie Elkins, a handsome, self-centered, narcissistic Cockney chauffeur in London, enjoys the sexual favours of married and single women while avoiding commitment. He is ending an affair with Siddie, a married woman, just as he gets his submissive girlfriend, Gilda, pregnant. Alfie thinks nothing of pilfering fuel and money from his employer and tells Gilda to do the same. Although he refuses to marry her, and despite his constant cheating, Gilda decides to have the child, Malcolm Alfred, and keep him rather than give him up.

Over time, Alfie becomes quite attached to his son, but his unwillingness to marry Gilda causes her to break up with him and marry Humphrey, a kindly bus conductor and neighbour who loves her and is willing to accept Malcolm Alfred as his own. Gilda bars Alfie from any further contact with Malcolm, forcing him to watch from a distance as Humphrey steps into his fatherly role. When a health check reveals Alfie has tubercular shadows on his lungs, the diagnosis and his fear of death, combined with his separation from his son, lead him to have a brief mental breakdown.

Alfie spends time recuperating in a pastoral sanatorium, where he befriends Harry, a fellow patient, a family man devoted to his frumpy wife, Lily. Alfie seduces one of the nurses, disgusting Harry. When Alfie flippantly suggests that Lily might be cheating on him, Harry angrily confronts Alfie about his attitudes and behaviour.

Released from the convalescent home, Alfie briefly stops working as a chauffeur to take holiday photos of tourists near the Tower of London. He meets Ruby, an older, voluptuous, affluent and promiscuous American who, although accompanied by an older gentleman, gives him her address and telephone number.

Alfie returns to chauffeuring and drives a Rolls-Royce to the sanatorium to visit Harry. He finds Lily finishing a visit with her husband, who asks him to give his wife a ride back to London to save her an exhausting train ride. Neither initially wants to spend time together, but they agree in order to please Harry. Along the way, they stop for tea and then a canoe ride where Alfie seduces Lily.

Later, chauffeuring again, Alfie spots a young red-headed hitchhiker, Annie, who wants a fresh start in London. A lorry driver picks her up just before Alfie gets to her. He follows them to a roadside diner and steals her away to London. She moves into his bedsit where she proves preoccupied with a love left behind, scrubbing Alfie's floor, doing his laundry and preparing his meals to compensate. The lorry driver finds Alfie in a pub and punches him in the face, causing a bar brawl.

Coming home with a black eye, Alfie grows resentful of Annie and drives her out with an angry outburst, immediately regretting it. Around the same time, Lily informs him that she is pregnant from their one encounter, and they plan for her to have an abortion. Lily comes to his flat to meet the abortionist. During the procedure, Alfie leaves Lily and walks around the city. He catches sight of his son Malcolm outside a church and witnesses the baptism of Gilda and Humphrey's new daughter. The abortion traumatises both Lily and Alfie; he breaks down in tears when seeing the aborted foetus, the first time he confronts the consequences of his actions.

Stressed by the situations with Annie and Lily, Alfie decides to change his non-committal ways and settle down with Ruby. However, visiting her, he finds a younger man in her bed. He runs into Siddie, but she has lost interest in him and returned to her husband. Alfie is left lonely, wondering about his life choices and the meaning of existence. A stray dog approaches him, and he takes it in his care as he walks off into the night.

== Cast ==
- Michael Caine as Alfie Elkins
- Shelley Winters as Ruby
- Millicent Martin as Siddie
- Julia Foster as Gilda
- Jane Asher as Annie
- Shirley Anne Field as Carla
- Vivien Merchant as Lily Clamacraft
- Eleanor Bron as the doctor
- Denholm Elliott as the abortionist
- Alfie Bass as Harry Clamacraft
- Graham Stark as Humphrey
- Murray Melvin as Nat
- Sydney Tafler as Frank
- Queenie Watts as the blonde pub singer (uncredited)
- Pauline Boty as the laundress (uncredited)
- Bryan Marshall as Perce (uncredited)

== Production ==
=== Development ===
Director Lewis Gilbert bought the film rights with Leslie Grade. Grade sold his share to James Woolf, who wanted Laurence Harvey to play the role. Gilbert did not think Harvey would be right, but agreed only if Harvey played in the play on Broadway first. Harvey refused, electing to appear in Camelot instead.

Gilbert was going to make No Bail for the Judge with George Peppard for Paramount, but the film fell over. Since Paramount still paid Gilbert his fee, Gilbert offered to make Alfie for them instead at half his usual fee. Terence Stamp read the script and wanted to do it for a reduced fee, which made Paramount happy as Stamp was doing The Collector for William Wyler. Gilbert insisted Stamp do the play on Broadway and Stamp agreed; the play flopped. "He really was bad," said Gilbert of Stamp, "he didn't have the experience." Stamp decided not to do the film. Gilbert says his son suggested Michael Caine who was a friend. Gilbert admired Caine's work in The Ipcress File and managed to get him approved by Paramount.

=== Casting ===
Vivien Merchant was a last minute replacement for Rachel Roberts, who had to drop out because her father was ill.

=== Filming ===
It was shot at Twickenham Studios with scenes shot at several locations in London; including Waterloo Bridge which is seen at the beginning and end of the film where the title character walks into the distance accompanied by a stray dog and Tower Bridge which is the backdrop for the photography scene with Shelley Winters.

=== Title sequences ===
The film is unusual in that it has no opening credits and the end credits feature photos of the principal actors, as well as of the main technical crew, including director Gilbert and cameraman Otto Heller.

=== Music ===
The original film soundtrack featured jazz saxophonist Sonny Rollins with London musicians including Stan Tracey on piano, who improvised "Little Malcolm Loves His Dad" (although never credited), Rick Laird on bass, Phil Seamen on drums, Ronnie Scott on tenor sax.

The Sonny Rollins album Alfie, orchestrated and conducted by Oliver Nelson, was recorded in the United States in January 1966. It features Rollins with J.J. Johnson – trombone (tracks 1 and 2), Jimmy Cleveland – trombone (tracks 3–6), Phil Woods – alto saxophone, Bob Ashton – tenor saxophone, Danny Bank – baritone saxophone, Roger Kellaway – piano, Kenny Burrell – guitar, Walter Booker – bass and Frankie Dunlop – drums

The title song, "Alfie", written by Burt Bacharach and Hal David, was sung by Cher over the film's closing credits in the US release, reaching number 32 on the Billboard Hot 100 chart. The track became a hit for British singer Cilla Black and for American singers Madeline Eastman and Dionne Warwick.

== Reception ==
=== Box office ===
The film was a huge box-office success. Lewis Gilbert says the film's success prompted Charles Bluhdorn (who bought Paramount Pictures in 1966) to make "around twenty pictures" without stars at around $500,000 each "and they all died".

=== Critical response ===
On the review aggregator website Rotten Tomatoes, the film holds an approval rating of 97% based on 29 reviews, with an average rating of 8.1/10. The website's critics consensus reads: "Anchored by Michael Caine's charmingly droll performance, Alfie is an equally raucous and heart-rending portrait of romance in the Swinging '60s." Metacritic, which uses a weighted average, assigned the film a score of 70 out of 100, based on 10 critics, indicating "generally favorable" reviews.

Bosley Crowther, film reviewer for The New York Times, singled out Vivien Merchant's acting for particular praise:

There must be an abortion—a miserable and tragic thing, which Lewis Gilbert, who produced and directed, makes us sense in all its shabbiness and shame. But it is the performance of Miss Merchant as the woman brought to this shame, stunned and saddened by the necessity, deadened by her grief, that shocks us into feeling contempt for Alfie—and all the free-wheeling Alfies in this world.

=== Accolades ===
Award	Category	Recipient(s)	Result	Ref.
Academy Awards	Best Picture	Lewis Gilbert	Nominated	
Academy Awards	Best Actor	Michael Caine	Nominated	
Academy Awards	Best Supporting Actress	Vivien Merchant	Nominated	
Academy Awards	Best Screenplay – Based on Material from Another Medium	Bill Naughton	Nominated	
Academy Awards	Best Song	"Alfie"; Music by Burt Bacharach; Lyrics by Hal David	Nominated	
British Academy Film Awards	Best British Film	Lewis Gilbert	Nominated	
British Academy Film Awards	Best British Actor	Michael Caine	Nominated	
British Academy Film Awards	Best British Screenplay	Bill Naughton	Nominated	
British Academy Film Awards	Best British Cinematography – Colour	Otto Heller	Nominated	
British Academy Film Awards	Best British Film Editing	Thelma Connell	Nominated	
British Academy Film Awards	Most Promising Newcomer to Leading Film Roles	Vivien Merchant	Won	
Cannes Film Festival	Palme d'Or	Lewis Gilbert	Nominated	
Cannes Film Festival	Special Jury Prize	Lewis Gilbert	Won	
Directors Guild of America Awards	Outstanding Directorial Achievement in Motion Pictures	Lewis Gilbert	Nominated	
Golden Globe Awards	Best English-Language Foreign Film		Won	
Golden Globe Awards	Best Actor in a Motion Picture – Drama	Michael Caine	Nominated	
Golden Globe Awards	Best Supporting Actress – Motion Picture	Vivien Merchant	Nominated	
Golden Globe Awards	Best Supporting Actress – Motion Picture	Shelley Winters	Nominated	
Golden Globe Awards	Best Director – Motion Picture	Lewis Gilbert	Nominated	
Golden Globe Awards	Best Screenplay – Motion Picture	Bill Naughton	Nominated	
Golden Globe Awards	Best Original Song – Motion Picture	"Alfie"; Music by Burt Bacharach; Lyrics by Hal David	Nominated	
Grammy Awards	Best Original Score Written for a Motion Picture or a Television Show	Sonny Rollins	Nominated	
Kansas City Film Critics Circle Awards	Best Actor	Michael Caine	Won	
Laurel Awards	Top Drama		4th Place	
Laurel Awards	Top Female Supporting Performance	Shelley Winters	Nominated	
Laurel Awards	Top Song	"Alfie"; Music by Burt Bacharach; Lyrics by Hal David	4th Place	
National Board of Review Awards	Top Ten Films		3rd Place	
National Board of Review Awards	Best Supporting Actress	Vivien Merchant	Won	
National Society of Film Critics Awards	Best Actor	Michael Caine	Won	
Writers' Guild of Great Britain Awards	Best British Dramatic Screenplay	Bill Naughton	Won	

== Legacy ==
The 1966 film was followed by Alfie Darling (1975), with Alan Price replacing Caine. An updated 2004 remake starred Jude Law in the title role.

== See also ==
- BFI Top 100 British films
