= Carole Mowlam =

British actress (1936–2012)

- Born: 20 December 1936; Epsom, Surrey, United Kingdom
- Died: 14 April 2012 (aged 75); Lambeth, London, United Kingdom
- Occupation: Actress
- Years active: 1957–1989 (TV)

Carole Mowlam (20 December 1936 – 14 April 2012) was a British stage and film actress.

She appeared in a recurring role in the early British soap opera The Grove Family. In 1961 she starred in the BBC's The House Under the Water, based on the novel by Francis Brett Young.

Mowlam became a regular character as Clare Miller in later seasons of the BBC drama series The Brothers (1975-6) and appeared alongside Ian Hendry in the 1977 television play The Goldfinch as part of The Sunday Drama series.

== Selected filmography ==
Year	Title	Role	Notes
1956 - 1957	The Grove Family	Pat Grove	29 episodes
1960	Probation Officer	Jane Wilson	1 episode
1961	The House Under the Water	Philippa Tregaron	8 episodes
1963	Z Cars	Mrs. Green	Episode: "Special Duty"
1964	Melissa	Mary Antrobus	2 episodes
1964	Our Man at St. Mark's	Jennifer	Episode: "Smoke Without Fire"
1964	Sergeant Cork	Felicity Bundy	Episode: The Case of the Hero's Return"
1966	Adam Adamant Lives!	Nurse Henders	Episode: "A Slight Case of Reincarnation"
1966	Emergency Ward 10	Dora Zandini	2 episodes
1966	The Likely Lads	The Nurse	Episode: "The Rocker"
1966	Redcap	Joyce Cole	Episode: "The Proper Charlie"
1968	Mr. Rose	Barbara Scott-Russell	Episode: "The Unlucky Dip"
1968	Spindoe	Ruth	2 episodes
1969	Counterstrike	Carole	Episode: "Monolith"
1969	The Troubleshooters	Fran	Episode: "How Much is One Man Worth?"
1969 - 1970	Freewheelers	Fiona	26 episodes
1971	Dixon of Dock Green	Jane Lester	Episode: "No One Loses"
1972	Budgie	Waitress	Episode: "The Outside Man"
1972	Harriet's Back in Town	Margaret Foster	16 episodes
1973	Softly, Softly: Task Force	Patti Nolan	Episode: "For Love or Money"
1975 - 1976	The Brothers	Clare Miller	26 episodes
1977	Coronation Street	Anne Woodley	4 episodes
1977	The Sunday Drama	Edith Rees	Episode: "The Goldfinch"
1983	Emmerdale	Dr. Conway	2 episodes
1989	Summer's Lease	Sandra Kettering	Episode: "The Urbino Trail"

== Bibliography ==
- Ellen Baskin. Serials on British Television, 1950–1994. Scolar Press, 1996.
- Gabriel Hershman. Send in the Clowns – The Yo Yo Life of Ian Hendry. 2013.
- Su Holmes. Entertaining television: The BBC and popular television culture in the 1950s. Manchester University Press, 2015.
