= Our Man at St. Mark's =

British TV comedy series (1963–1966)

- Genre: Sitcom
- Written by: Peter Miller; James Kelley
- Starring: Joan Hickson; Donald Sinden; Harry Fowler; Leslie Phillips
- Country of origin: United Kingdom
- Original language: English
- No. of series: 4
- No. of episodes: 46

Production
- Producer: Eric Maschwitz
- Running time: 30 minutes
- Production company: Associated-Rediffusion Television

Original release
- Network: ITV
- Release: 25 September 1963 – 28 December 1966

Our Man at St. Mark's is a British comedy television series that originally aired on ITV between 1963 and 1966. Today the series is largely lost, with only 8 out of 46 episodes remaining in the archives.

It focuses on the parish of St Mark's, with Leslie Phillips starring as the Reverend Andrew Parker during the first season before being replaced by Donald Sinden as the Reverend Stephen Young. Joan Hickson played Mrs. Peace, the housekeeper. The series was originally intended to be called There Was a Young Vicar, but it was decided this sounded too much like the beginning of a limerick and a more respectful title was chosen. The show proved to be a ratings hit, although only six complete episodes are known to have survived.

Comparisons are often made with another clerical comedy All Gas and Gaiters which aired shortly afterwards on the BBC and was focused on a fictional cathedral rather than workings of an ordinary parish.

== Cast ==
=== Main ===
- Joan Hickson as Mrs. Peace (46 episodes)
- Donald Sinden as Rev. Stephen Young (39 episodes)
- Harry Fowler as Harry Danvers (18 episodes)
- Clive Morton as The Bishop (14 episodes)
- Leslie Phillips as Rev. Andrew Parker (7 episodes)

=== Other ===
Other actors who appeared in episodes of the show included Fay Compton, Francesca Annis, James Beck, Terence Alexander, Joyce Carey, Julian Holloway, Trevor Bannister, Victor Maddern, Annette Andre, Pauline Yates, Derek Francis, David Hemmings, Warren Mitchell, Freddie Jones, David Langton, Peter Vaughan, Michael Gwynn, Patrick Barr, Erik Chitty, Ronald Leigh-Hunt, George A. Cooper, Campbell Singer, Carole Mowlam, Linda Marlowe, Godfrey Quigley, Ann Bell and David Lodge.

== Archive status ==
Of the 46 episodes produced, only 8 complete episodes (episodes 1 & 5 from series 1, episode 6 from series 2, and episodes 1, 3, 4, 7 & 11 from series 3) are known to have survived as telerecordings, due to the wiping of videotapes and destruction of film copies. The unaired pilot episode is also missing. Episode 9 from series 3 also exists, but the sound is missing. One episode (episode 12 from series 2) has some surviving sequences on film, although the sound is missing (most likely due to damage to the prints).

== Bibliography ==
- Marcus Harmes, Meredith Harmes & Barbara Harmes. The Church on British Television: From the Coronation to Coronation Street. Springer Nature, 2020.
