= Emrys James =

Welsh actor

- James in Sherlock Holmes: The Sign of Four (1987)
- Born: Robert Emrys James; 1 September 1928; Machynlleth, Wales
- Died: 5 February 1989 (aged 60); Evesham, Worcestershire, England
- Education: RADA
- Occupation: Actor
- Spouse: Sian James (m. 1952–1989; his death)
- Children: 4

Robert Emrys James (1 September 1928 – 5 February 1989) was a Welsh actor. He performed in many theatre and television roles between 1960 and 1989, and was an Associate Artist of the Royal Shakespeare Company.

== Early life ==
James was born in Machynlleth, the son of a railwayman, and attended the University of Wales, Aberystwyth.

== Selected theatre work ==
After training at RADA, in 1953 James joined Peter Hall and John Barton's Oxford Playhouse-based Elizabethan Theatre Company. In 1956 he played his first season at Stratford, taking the roles of Guildernstern, Salerio in The Merchant of Venice and Claudio in Measure for Measure. Seasons at the Bristol Old Vic and the Old Vic, London, followed.

James's notable roles at the RSC included Sir Hugh Evans in The Merry Wives of Windsor, 1968; Gower in Pericles, 1969; Feste in Twelfth Night, 1969; The Boss in Günter Grass' The Plebeians Rehearse the Uprising, 1970; The Cardinal in John Webster's The Duchess of Malfi, 1971; Shylock in The Merchant of Venice, 1971; Iago in Othello, 1971; the title role in King John, 1974; Mephistopheles in Christopher Marlowe's Doctor Faustus, 1974; Chorus in Henry V, 1975; the title role in Henry IV, Parts 1 and 2, 1975–76; York in Henry VI, parts I, II and III, 1977–78; Jaques in As You Like It, 1977; De Flores in The Changeling and Edgar in Strindberg's The Dance of Death, 1978; Cassius in Julius Caesar, 1983; Malvolio in Twelfth Night, 1984; and Sir Giles Overreach in Philip Massinger's A New Way to Pay Old Debts, 1984.

In 1981, James played Lopakhin in The Cherry Orchard at Chichester Festival Theatre.

== Personal life ==
In 1958 James married the novelist Sian James, whom he had met while they were both students at the University of Wales. The couple set up home, firstly in London then in Warwickshire, when James began his lasting association with the RSC at Stratford. They had four children: William, Owen, Jo and Anna.

== Selected TV and films ==
- How Green Was My Valley (1960, TV series) – Gwilym Morgan Jr.
- The House Under the Water (1961, TV series) – Rob Tregaron
- Z-Cars (1963, TV Series) – Cyclist
- Moulded in Earth (1965, TV Series) – Edwin Peele
- Broome Stages (1966, TV Series) – Morgan
- Talking to a Stranger (1966, TV Series) – Gordon Lester
- Seven of One (1973, TV Series) – Reverend Simmonds
- Softly, Softly (1973, TV Series) – Jack Hodder
- Wessex Tales (1973, TV Movie) – David Lloyd George
- Play of the Month (1973, TV Series) – Doolittle / Dr. Pangloss
- Fall of Eagles (1974, TV Mini-Series) – Count Taaffe
- Days of Hope (1975, TV Mini-Series) – Thomas Jones
- The Man in The Iron Mask (1977) – Percerin
- Testament of Youth (1979, TV Series) – Mr Brittain
- Hammer House of Horror (1980, TV Series) – Dr. Harris
- Hamlet, Prince of Denmark (1980, TV Movie) – Player King
- Gauguin the Savage (1980, TV movie) – Maurice Schuffenecker
- Doctor Who (1980, TV Series: State of Decay) – Aukon / Anthony O'Connor
- Open All Hours (1981, TV Series) – Eli Bickerdyke
- Antony and Cleopatra (BBC, 1981, TV Movie) – Enobarbus
- Dragonslayer (1981) – Valerian's Father
- Giro City (1982) – Tommy Williams
- Dombey & Son (1983, TV Series) – Captain Cuttle
- Eureka (1983) – Judge
- Anna of the Five Towns (1985, TV Mini-Series) – Ephraim Tellwright
- God's Chosen Carpark (1986, TV Movie) – Nathaniel Box
- The Adventures of Sherlock Holmes (1987, TV Series: The Sign of Four) – Inspector Athelney Jones
- The Diary of Anne Frank (1987, TV Series) – Otto Frank
- Out of Love (1988, TV film) – Emrys Price
- Father Brown (1988?, Italian TV Series) – Padre Brown
