= Nicholas Nickleby (1957 TV series) =

- Genre: Historical drama
- Based on: Nicholas Nickleby by Charles Dickens
- Written by: Vincent Tilsley
- Directed by: Eric Tayler
- Starring: William Russell; Jennifer Wilson; Malcolm Keen
- Country of origin: United Kingdom
- Original language: English
- No. of series: 1
- No. of episodes: 10 (all missing)

Production
- Producer: Douglas Allen
- Production company: BBC

Original release
- Network: BBC One
- Release: 18 October – 20 December 1957

Nicholas Nickleby is a British television series that first aired on the BBC in 1957. It is based on the novel Nicholas Nickleby by Charles Dickens.

Broadcast live, all ten episodes were telerecorded, but are now considered lost.

== Cast ==
- William Russell as Nicholas Nickleby (10 episodes)
- Jennifer Wilson as Kate Nickleby (10 episodes)
- Malcolm Keen as Ralph Nickleby (9 episodes)
- Richard Wordsworth as Newman Noggs (9 episodes)
- Gillian Lind as Mrs Catherine Nickleby (8 episodes)
- Brian Peck as Smike (8 episodes)
- Esmond Knight as Wackford Squeers Sr (6 episodes)
- Rosamund Greenwood as Miss La Creevy (5 episodes)
- George Howe as Mr Charles Cheeryble (5 episodes)
- Keith Davis as Wackford Squeers Jr (4 episodes)
- Barry Foster as Frank Cheeryble (4 episodes)
- Anthony Jacobs as Arthur Gride (4 episodes)
- Lyn James as Madeline Bray (4 episodes)
- Bartlett Mullins as Tim Linkinwater (4 episodes)
- Douglas Wilmer as Sir Mulberry Hawk (4 episodes)
- Graham Crowden as Mr Pyke (3 episodes)
- Fabia Drake as Madame Mantalini (3 episodes)
- Roddy Hughes as Mr Ned Cheeryble (3 episodes)
- Fay Compton as Mrs Squeers (2 episodes)
- Rosalind Knight as Miss Fanny Squeers (2 episodes)
- Brian Rawlinson as John Browdie (2 episodes)
- Maurice Colbourne as Walter Bray (2 episodes)

== Bibliography ==
- Michael Pointer. Charles Dickens on the Screen: The Film, Television, and Video Adaptations. Scarecrow Press, 1996.
