= The House Under the Water (TV series) =

British TV series

- Genre: Historical drama
- Based on: The House Under the Water by Francis Brett Young
- Written by: Barry Thomas
- Directed by: Dafydd Gruffydd
- Starring: Margaret Courtenay; Richard Bebb; Carole Mowlam
- Country of origin: United Kingdom
- Original language: English
- No. of series: 1
- No. of episodes: 8

Production
- Producer: Dafydd Gruffydd
- Running time: 30 minutes
- Production company: BBC Wales

Original release
- Network: BBC Television
- Release: 27 January – 17 March 1961

The House Under the Water is a British historical television drama series, which originally aired on BBC One in eight parts during 1961. It is an adaptation of the 1932 novel The House Under the Water by Francis Brett Young, which portrays the late nineteenth century flooding of the Elan Valley in Wales to create a water supply for the rapidly growing city of Birmingham.

All eight episodes are now considered to be lost.

== Cast ==
- Margaret Courtenay as Lucrezia Tregaron (8 episodes)
- Richard Bebb as Evan Vaughan (8 episodes)
- Carole Mowlam as Philippa Tregaron (8 episodes)
- Emrys James as Rob Tregaron (8 episodes)
- William Squire as Griffith Tregaron (7 episodes)
- Ray Smith as Gerald Tregaron (7 episodes)
- Hira Talfrey as Caterina (7 episodes)
- Lesley Lloyd as Virginia Tregaron (6 episodes)
- Aubrey Richards as Abel Pugh (6 episodes)
- Annest Williams as Diana Tregaron (5 episodes)
- Patricia Mort as Janet Delahaye (5 episodes)
- Arnold Bell as Sir Trevor Delahaye (4 episodes)
- David Lyn as Charles Lingen (4 episodes)
- June Lewis as Sula Meredith (4 episodes)
- David Lawton as Louis Wiener (4 episodes)
- Hubert Rees as Esmond Delahaye (3 episodes)
- D.L. Davies as Meredith (2 episodes)
- Ian Colin as Sir Arthur Weldon (2 episodes)
- Edward Evans as Mr. Barradale (2 episodes)
- Ieuan Rhys Williams as Mr. Prosser (2 episodes)
- Otto Diamant as Otto Wiener (2 episodes)
- T.H. Evans as Man at the Inn (1 episode)
- Ivor Maddox as Stockbroker (1 episode)
- Emrys Cleaver as Man at the Inn (1 episode)
- W.H. Williams as Man at the Inn (1 episode)
- Pryor Williams as Sergeant Ambrose (1 episode)
- John Gill as Mr. Verona (1 episode)
- Desmond Llewelyn as Colonel Tregaron (1 episode)
- Conrad Evans as Mr. Parry (1 episode)
- Frederick Schiller as Mr. Dagmar (1 episode)

== Bibliography ==
- Ellen Baskin. Serials on British Television, 1950-1994. Scolar Press, 1996.
