= The Brothers (1972 TV series) =

British TV drama series (1972–1976)

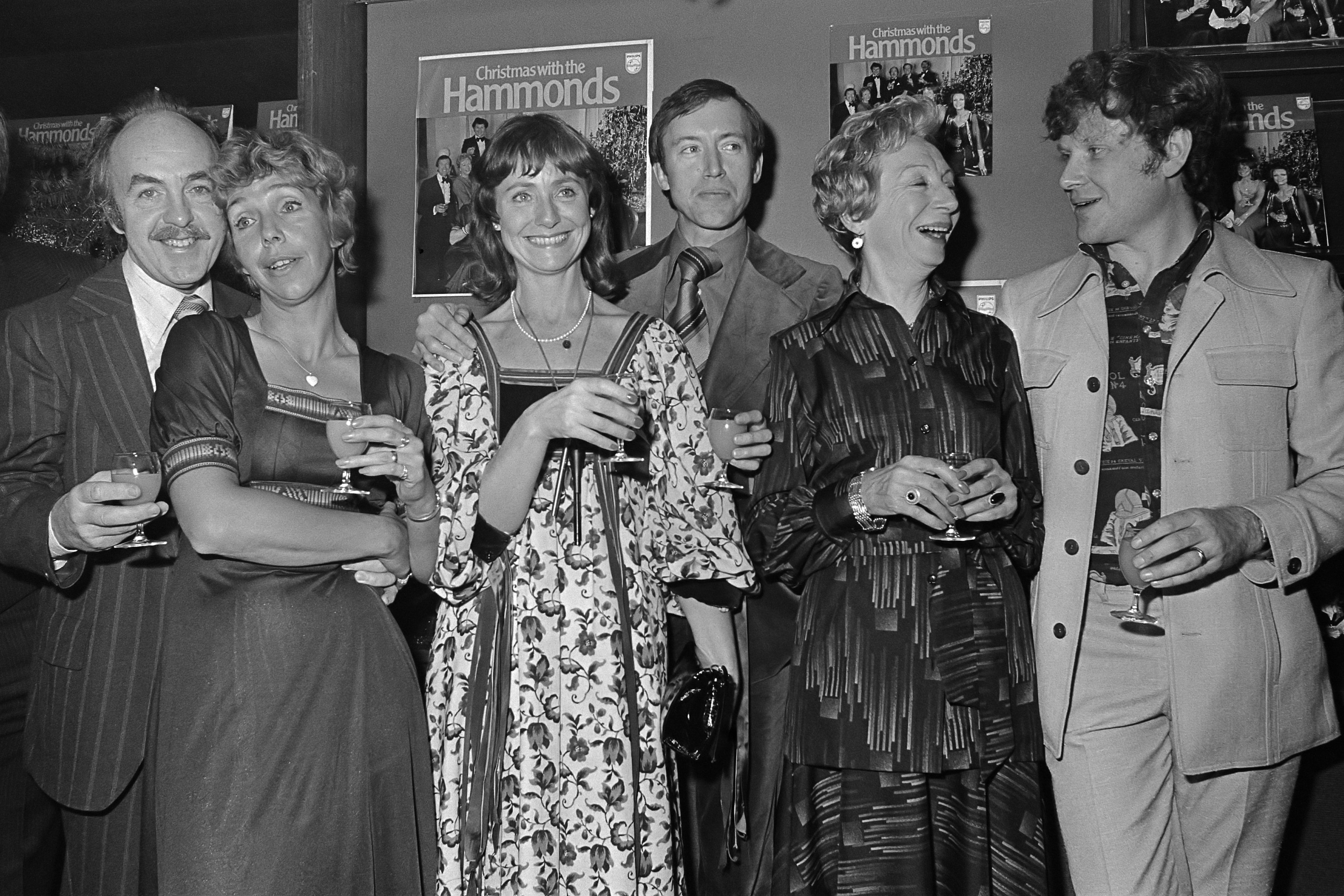
- The Brothers (1976), left to right: Derek Benfield, Margaret Ashcroft, Jennifer Wilson, Robin Chadwick, Jean Anderson, Colin Baker
- Genre: Drama
- Created by: Gerard Glaister & N. J. Crisp
- Written by: N. J. Crisp; Eric Paice; John Pennington; Simon Raven; Douglas Watkinson; Brian Finch; Ray Jenkins; Elaine Morgan
- Directed by: Philip Dudley; Lennie Mayne; Ronald Wilson; Timothy Combe; Mary Ridge; Quentin Lawrence; Eric Price; Roderick Graham; Vere Lorrimer; Christopher Baker
- Starring: Jean Anderson; Glyn Owen; Richard Easton; Robin Chadwick; Patrick O'Connell; Jennifer Wilson; Derek Benfield; Hilary Tindall; Gabrielle Drake; Colin Baker; Carole Mowlam
- Theme music composer: Dudley Simpson
- Country of origin: United Kingdom
- Original language: English
- No. of series: 7
- No. of episodes: 92

Production
- Producer: Gerard Glaister
- Production locations: Greenwich, London, England, United Kingdom
- Running time: 50 minutes

Original release
- Network: BBC1
- Release: 10 March 1972 – 19 December 1976

The Brothers is a British television series produced and shown by the BBC in 1972–1976.

Debuting with the death of road haulage magnate Robert Hammond, the series followed the trials and tribulations of the company and family/families he left behind, with equal shares in Hammond Transport Services left to each of his three sons and to his secretary (who was revealed to have been Hammond's mistress and the mother of his illegitimate daughter).

== Synopsis ==
The series was based around conflict within the Hammond family over the direction of the family firm, a London-based road haulage business called Hammond Transport Services, after the death of patriarch Robert Hammond. The eldest son, Edward (played by Glyn Owen during the first series and by Patrick O'Connell for the remainder of the show's run), prepares to take over the running of the business, only to find that his father has left equal shares to his two other sons – accountant Brian (Richard Easton) and young graduate David (Robin Chadwick; 5 November 1939 – 7 September 2025) – and to his mistress and secretary Jennifer Kingsley (Jennifer Wilson). Storylines throughout the series dealt with plans to expand the business into an international concern, coupled with more family-orientated plots as Edward and Jennifer fall in love and marry.

Other prominent characters included Robert Hammond's hard-faced widow and the mother of the three brothers, Mary (Jean Anderson), who is determined to continue exercising her own influence over her family, Brian's shrewish wife Ann (Hilary Tindall) and David's girlfriend and then wife Jill (Gabrielle Drake). Later characters to be introduced included the loathsome financial whizkid, merchant banker and proto-yuppie Paul Merroney (Colin Baker), his secretary Clare Miller (Carole Mowlam), April Winter (Liza Goddard), who became Merroney's wife, and Jane Maxwell (Kate O'Mara), the tough female boss of an air freight business. Baker and Goddard married in real life in 1976, but divorced in 1978.

Bill, the foreman (Derek Benfield), demonstrated how the workplace of the 1970s was changing. His elevation from the shop floor to a key member of the board was met with resistance from both ends, and the subsequent decades allow this to be seen in context, one way that management and workers may work closer together to maintain the company's competitive outlook. The character of Paul Merroney can in hindsight be viewed as a prototype for the new Thatcher-inspired generation of corporate go-getters.

The show also featured Mike Pratt playing the character Don Stacey (1975–76). This was the final role that he played before his early death.

After the end of the seventh series in 1976, the show finished. There was no formal cancellation of the show, but a further series was never commissioned.

Created by Gerard Glaister and N. J. Crisp, the series was also produced by Glaister. The Brothers became a highly popular Sunday night favourite with BBC viewers throughout its run.

A re-run of the series on Talking Pictures TV began on Monday 1 January 2024

== Cast album ==
The popularity of the series in The Netherlands (where it was titled The Hammonds) resulted in a Christmas album recorded by the main characters. Christmas with The Hammonds, produced by Dutch TV host Willem Duys, reached number 22 in the Dutch LP Top 50 in December 1976.

== Main cast list ==
Character	Actor	Series						
Character	Actor	Series 1	Series 2	Series 3	Series 4	Series 5	Series 6	Series 7
Mary Hammond	Jean Anderson							
Edward Hammond	Glyn Owen							
Edward Hammond	Patrick O'Connell							
Brian Hammond	Richard Easton							
David Hammond	Robin Chadwick							
Jennifer Kingsley	Jennifer Wilson							
Bill Riley	Derek Benfield							
Ann Hammond	Hilary Tindall							
Jill Williams	Gabrielle Drake							
Barbara Kingsley	Julia Goodman							
Sally Woolfe	Annette Andre							
Harry Carter	Mark McManus							
Nicholas Fox	Jonathan Newth							
Julie Lane	Gillian McCutcheon							
Nancy Lincoln	Claire Nielson							
Pamela Graham	Anna Fox							
Johnny Trent	Malcolm Stoddard							
Gwen Riley	Margaret Ashcroft							
Martin Farrell	Murray Hayne							
Paul Merroney	Colin Baker							
Jane Maxwell	Kate O'Mara							
Don Stacy	Mike Pratt							
Clare Miller	Carole Mowlam							
April Winter	Liza Goddard							
Van der Merwe	Joby Blanshard							

== Series overview ==
Series	Episodes	Originally released	
Series	Episodes	First released	Last released
1	10	10 March 1972	12 May 1972
2	13	14 January 1973	8 April 1973
3	13	3 February 1974	5 May 1974
4	14	1 September 1974	8 December 1974
5	13	6 April 1975	29 June 1975
6	13	25 January 1976	18 April 1976
7	16	5 September 1976	19 December 1976

== Episodes ==
=== Series 1 (1972) ===
Broadcast on Friday evenings on BBC1, in varying time slots, with the most common time slot being 8:10pm–9:00pm.

No. overall	No. in series	Title	Directed by	Written by	Original release date
1	1	"End of The Beginning"	Ronald Wilson	N. J. Crisp	10 March 1972
The death of Robert Hammond brings the inevitable grief to the Hammond family. However, there are shocks in store at the reading of the will. Robert has left his flourishing haulage business to the equal care of his three sons – and his secret mistress, company secretary Jennifer Kingsley. In addition, he has made provision for Barbara Kingsley, his illegitimate daughter.
2	2	"Down to Business"	Ronald Wilson	N. J. Crisp	17 March 1972
The newly appointed Hammond board sets to work. It proves a somewhat uneasy alliance. Barbara Kingsley is still troubled by the revelation of her real parentage and Ted is determined he will be the majority shareholder and sets about persuading the others to sell.
3	3	"Confrontation"	Philip Dudley	N. J. Crisp	24 March 1972
David's romance with Jill continues to be rocky. Mary summons Jennifer and Barbara to the family home for an explosive meeting. Ann schemes to get Brian to return to his old job.
4	4	"Decisions"	Eric Price	N. J. Crisp	31 March 1972
A new sales rep, Frank Walker, makes an impression on Jennifer. Ted keeps up the pressure to get his hands on further shares and Ann plays the femme fatale with her brother-in-law David.
5	5	"The Party"	Ronald Wilson	N. J. Crisp	7 April 1972
An important client throws a party, and the board of directors of Hammond's are all invited. David uses it as an opportunity to finish with Jill and Ann is determined to make the most of her night without husband Brian in tow.
6	6	"Turning Point"	Philip Dudley	Eric Paice	14 April 1972
Brian is concerned about Ann's movements after the Birkett party as cracks in their marriage continue to widen. David touts for business with paint mogul Sir John Borret and appears to secure a deal. Edward smells a rat but his opposition to major financial outlay to accommodate the new Borret deal is overridden in a board vote.
7	7	"The Perfect Day"	Eric Price	Eric Paice	21 April 1972
Work begins on building a storage facility for the Borret paint. The firm has borrowed substantially so its future depends on the success of the contract. A looming dock strike suddenly brings dark storm clouds over Hammond's. Financially they are stretched to the limit so if the strike continues for a short period the firm could be placed in a perilous situation. Has Sir John played a cunning hand?
8	8	"Crisis"	Ronald Wilson	Eric Paice	28 April 1972
The strike by the dock workers spells potential disaster for Hammonds Transport, thanks to the extra financial outlay for the Borret contract. Ann continues to put pressure on Brian to move to a larger house. Bill and David attempt to cross the picket line.
9	9	"A Worm in The Bud"	Philip Dudley	Eric Paice	5 May 1972
Sir John invites the Hammond board to lunch - but he has an agenda to trap them as the strike reaches its conclusion. Following an extravagant shopping expedition Ann finally leaves Brian.
10	10	"Full Circle"	Ronald Wilson	Eric Paice	12 May 1972
With the strike over, Hammond's can finally look to the future with possible expansion plans. Ann is finding it harder than she thought away from her husband and Ted is growing closer to Jennifer - but Mary is determined to have her say on the matter.

=== Series 2 (1973) ===
Broadcast on Sunday evenings on BBC1 from 7:25pm–8:15pm.

No. overall	No. in series	Title	Directed by	Written by	Original release date
11	1	"A Family Gathering"	Quentin Lawrence	N. J. Crisp	14 January 1973
Mary Hammond returns from recuperation abroad, determined to drive a wedge between Edward and Jennifer. Harry Carter, of Carter's Express Deliveries, puts in an impressive offer for land adjoining the Hammond depot - land Edward thought was already promised to his firm.
12	2	"Wheels And Deals"	Prudence Fitzgerald	N. J. Crisp	21 January 1973
When Mary finds a phone number in Edward's pocket, she learns an ex-girlfriend is back on the scene. It is another weapon in her war against Jennifer. The board have to vote on a takeover bid for Carter's firm. Edward will be against it. Or will he?
13	3	"The Trojan Horse"	Quentin Lawrence	Eric Paice	28 January 1973
The standoff with Carter continues but David reckons that Carter is not in as strong a position as he makes out. Mary continues to manipulate the lives of her children but with Edward she may have gone too far.
14	4	"Snakes and Ladders"	Terence Williams	Eric Paice	4 February 1973
Carter finally lays out his conditions for the takeover. With a seat on the board at the top of the list, the Hammond's board takes a vote. Ann confronts Brian about his new lady friend.
15	5	"Labour Pains"	Prudence Fitzgerald	N. J. Crisp	11 February 1973
Harry Carter has cunningly invited all the Hammonds around to his apartment for drinks. One by one the brothers drop out, which leaves Mary and Jennifer the only guests that turn up! Barbara is in awe of her new art tutor Nicholas Fox and at the depot trouble is brewing between the Carter and Hammond drivers.
16	6	"Negotiations"	Prudence Fitzgerald	N. J. Crisp	18 February 1973
With strike action threatened, the union is called in to settle the conflict with the two sets of drivers. Carter is determined that the union will not have a say in the way he handles the unrest, but Ted is a much more experienced negotiator. David falls for the charms of Jill's flatmate Julie.
17	7	"Declarations of Independence"	Philip Dudley	N. J. Crisp	25 February 1973
Ann's continued baiting of Brian reaches a climax when she interrupts his evening with Pamela. The firm sinks deeper into debt and Ted pressures Brian into keeping them afloat. Barbara and her mother clash over her friendship with Nicholas.
18	8	"Errors of Judgement"	Mary Ridge	N. J. Crisp	4 March 1973
Hammond Transport is struggling to complete its delivery commitments. Barbara intends to go to Paris with Nicholas and Ann is using all her wily skills to gain Mary's support as she makes a move to keep Brian onside. A board meeting reveals the extent of Hammond's troubles. The cash flow is perilous and they need to recoup their debts urgently.
19	9	"Storm Birds"	Philip Dudley	Eric Paice	11 March 1973
The drivers' strike continues over the use of Harry Carter's non-unionised drivers. A full meeting of the board members and union representatives is made more difficult by Carter antagonising the union. Jill and Julie call on Mary, but Julie does not endear herself to the Hammond matriarch. Negotiations falter and Hammond Transport is starting to flounder under the weight of the problem. Brian discovers Ann has been making secret visits to the family home.
20	10	"Tightrope"	Philip Dudley	Eric Paice	18 March 1973
Whilst Harry wines and dines Jennifer, Ted arranges a late-night meeting with Reg Turner and Bill. Ann arrives home unexpectedly to find Pamela waiting for Brian. Tom Parker has left the country, and he owes Hammond Transport a lot of money. Without it they are sunk. Jill receives some devastating news. Carter plays a masterstroke to end the stalemate.
21	11	"A Marriage Is Arranged"	Ronald Wilson	Eric Paice	25 March 1973
With the lorries back on the road, concern grows about the whereabouts of Tom Parker. Barbara is finding her trip to Paris with Nicholas Fox is not all she wanted it to be. Mary invites Jill to lunch and together they conspire to get David to the altar. Brian's discreet enquiries about Parker shows that he is in trouble, making finding him more urgent. Ted flies out to Parker's last known whereabouts in Corfu in a desperate bid to sort out the debt. Whilst he is away Carter makes a move for the Chair in the board meeting.
22	12	"Women Are Trumps"	Mary Ridge	Eric Paice	1 April 1973
Edward has returned with grave news - Parker is going bankrupt. He also decides Carter has to go and gives him three options for how he can leave the company. But Carter wants buying out and cash is the one thing Hammonds do not have. Jill reveals the extent of her inheritance - £250,000. It occurs to Jill she might have the means to save Hammond Transport. With Pamela out of the picture, Ann and Brian start rebuilding their marriage.
23	13	"No Hard Feelings"	Ronald Wilson	N. J. Crisp	8 April 1973
The Hammond board votes to buy out Harry Carter. He parts company on good terms with everyone - except Mary Hammond. David is not happy that Jill's money alone is keeping the business afloat. Ann plays her final hand in her game to get husband Brian to take her back. Despite constant baiting from Julie, David marries Jill.

=== Series 3 (1974) ===
Broadcast on Sunday evenings on BBC1 from 7:25pm–8:15pm.

No. overall	No. in series	Title	Directed by	Written by	Original release date
24	1	"The Hammond Account"	Philip Dudley	N. J. Crisp	3 February 1974
Hammond Transport Services is once again in the position for expansion, thanks to Jill's guarantee. It appears everyone is optimistic for the future; however David is strangely reluctant. He proposes advertising for new accounts. However, the search for an advertising agency to handle the campaign brings with it two unexpected faces from the past. Bill is cautious about a new scheme being introduced involving the drivers. Barbara returns from months abroad with some shocking news for Jennifer.
25	2	"The Newly Weds"	Roderick Graham	N. J. Crisp	10 February 1974
Barbara attempts to placate her mother over the news that she has secretly married. But her new husband knows she is an heiress, which makes Jennifer even more suspicious. Ted wants a meeting with Johnny Trent so he can find out more about his motives. Bill confesses to Jennifer that all is not well at home, his wife Gwen is not happy living in their house any longer. Mary welcomes the newlyweds into her home. Jill returns to find that Julie is once more back in their lives. Ann has an encounter with Nicholas Fox which leaves her shaken.
26	3	"Suspicions"	Philip Dudley	N. J. Crisp	17 February 1974
With plans underway to improve Hammond Transport's links with Europe, David travels to Dover to look at sites for a potential new depot. Barbara and Mary chat frankly about Jennifer. Brian's new competitive drive in business excites Ann, but she is consumed by thoughts of Nicholas. David's resistance to the plans for expansion leads to a clash with his elder brothers. He seeks comfort from Julie, but he arrives home to find Jill in suspicious mood.
27	4	"Tug of War"	Roderick Graham	N. J. Crisp	24 February 1974
David openly opposes the plan for a new depot at Dover, causing Brian to go behind David's back and appeal directly to Jill. Ted convinces Mary to invite Jennifer round for dinner, but it is an invitation neither are looking forward to. Jill is convinced that David and Julie are having an affair, meanwhile David is furious that Brian has approached Jill without his knowledge and appeals directly to Ted. A new lorry driver, Jim Barker, turns up wanting a job but his motives are less than honourable.
28	5	"Hijack"	Philip Dudley	Eric Paice	3 March 1974
Ted and Bill travel to the continent as the first shipment for Hammond Transport heralds a new era for the company. However, they are unaware they are being followed. Nicholas Fox continues to exert his charisma over everyone and issues a charm offensive against Ann on a trip to an art gallery. On the way back to the London depot, the lorry driven by Bill and Jim is hijacked. The lorry is soon found but the load is missing. Suspicion immediately falls on the two drivers, but when Jim's background check comes back clean it is Bill who remains the strongest suspect.
29	6	"Riley"	Roderick Graham	Eric Paice	10 March 1974
Bill and Jim are both taken into custody. An incident in Bill's past on his police record puts him firmly in the hot seat for the hijacking. The dinner party is an uneasy gathering thanks to Jennifer's presence, and Jill is angered by an offhand comment from Ted. Nicholas and Ann continue to circle each other whilst Jennifer demands to know the extent of Johnny's debts with the boutique. She also reveals her suspicions that Bill has known about her affair with Robert Hammond for years. Jill, finally exhausted with David's constant excuses, suggests a divorce. Mary learns that Julie is destroying their marriage and vows to intercede.
30	7	"Trade Wind"	Philip Dudley	Eric Paice	17 March 1974
Barbara sees a way of settling Johnny's debts by borrowing against her future inheritance. Ann holds a dinner party inviting both Nicholas Fox and Pamela Graham. David places the board under pressure to release Jill's financial guarantee to the company. Barbara finds help with her loan from an ally close to home. Mary confronts Julie about her interference in David's marriage and the two clash. With Nicholas leaving for Brussels on business, Ann makes a confession as the situation starts to spiral out of control.
31	8	"Echoes"	Roderick Graham	Eric Paice	24 March 1974
Julie continues to be an ever-present temptation to David as she is appointed to work on the Hammond account by the advertising agency. Nicholas and Ann take another step in their continuing liaison whilst David clashes with Brian whilst standing in for Ted in the chairman's seat. Ann uses Pamela as a confidante in her ongoing obsession with Nicholas. Ted and Jenny go sailing, and David tells his mother to stop interfering with his life.
32	9	"An Impossible Debt"	Philip Dudley	N. J. Crisp	31 March 1974
Jennifer guesses the source of Barbara's loan and suddenly Johnny's debts assume unimagined importance. Ann seeks medical help for insomnia as she is wrestles with her feelings for Nicholas. The Hammond board release Jill's guarantee and she tells David he is free now the company do not need her financial backing. Jennifer is furious with both Barbara and Mary and makes a drastic decision which will have repercussions for everyone at Hammond Transport.
33	10	"Power for Sale"	Roderick Graham	N. J. Crisp	7 April 1974
Ted is floored by Jennifer's announcement and is mystified as to her reasons. A Dutch businessman Van Der Moewe is introduced to the board by Nicholas Fox, he could be a great ally in their plans to expand their operations into Europe. With Ted refusing to accept that Jennifer is serious, she opens up her offer to the other brothers. The triangle between David, Jill and Julie continues to threaten their marriage much to the concern of Mary.
34	11	"Conspirators"	Philip Dudley	Eric Paice	21 April 1974
The current situation sees Brian and David scrambling to raise cash in an effort to put themselves in the driving seat on the Hammond board. Bill Riley confides in Mary and Edward the reason he wants to leave the firm. In an effort to keep open her options, Jennifer visits her bank manager but the news he has for her is not what she was hoping. Jill is appalled to see David and Brian plotting against Ted and makes a decision regarding her role in the proceedings. When Ted finally finds out the reason for Jennifer's decision, he sets about putting things back in their natural order, and this means putting his brothers in their place.
35	12	"Perchance to Dream"	Roderick Graham	Eric Paice	28 April 1974
A desperate Ann tries, and fails, to fly to Brussels to be with Nicholas Fox. Barbara takes Mary news of a debit repaid. The family gather to celebrate David's birthday as they try to restore harmony. Ann's trip to see the children at boarding school leaves her ever more disconsolate, and Brian gets a shock at the end of the evening.
36	13	"Return to Nowhere"	Philip Dudley	No Writer Credit	5 May 1974
Ann is taken to hospital as Brian endures an anxious wait. Julie continues to play games with David but this time it is she who gets the biggest surprise. Bill tells Ted that he and Gwen have found the house they want. Ted and Jenny set off on holiday as Ann and Brian try to come to terms with what has happened. On their return to see Mary with important news, they have a shock in store.

=== Series 4 (1974) ===
Broadcast on Sunday evenings on BBC1 from 7:25pm–8:15pm, with a one week break in the series on 24 November 1974.

No. overall	No. in series	Title	Directed by	Written by	Original release date
37	1	"Emergency"	Roderick Graham	N. J. Crisp	1 September 1974
Edward and Jennifer return from holiday, anxious to acquaint Mary with their marriage plans but find her collapsed with another heart attack. The Hammonds prove their ability to rally round in a crisis. A good time for Riley's wife, Gwen, to lend her assistance.
38	2	"Secret Meetings"	Vere Lorrimer	N. J. Crisp	8 September 1974
As the debate about going public begins, manoeuvres are made for control of the board. In readiness Brian meets merchant banker Martin Farrell, while Edward sounds out Riley.
39	3	"Investigations"	Roderick Graham	N. J. Crisp	15 September 1974
The first steps are made for the Hammonds to go public. Farrell prepares the investigations, and in the process notices the company's organisational weaknesses.
40	4	"Happy Anniversary"	Vere Lorrimer	N. J. Crisp	22 September 1974
Riley and Farrell join the Hammonds' board. At once Brian and Riley come into conflict. But Brian's behaviour is really a reaction of his worsening relationship with Ann.
41	5	"Partings"	Roderick Graham	John Pennington	29 September 1974
Edward and Brian attend a lunch in the city with Paul Merroney, a merchant banker, to launch Hammonds as a public company. Edward begins to act the role, but Brian looks far from the part.
42	6	"Loneliness"	Lennie Mayne	John Pennington	6 October 1974
Brian and Ann apart face the problems of loneliness; by contrast Martin Farrell and Jennifer enjoy dinner together. Meanwhile the Hammonds are invited to a shoot – on business.
43	7	"Hit and Miss"	Lennie Mayne	John Pennington	13 October 1974
The procedure for making Hammonds a public company get underway, and the directors attend a shooting party to meet Sir Neville Henniswode – the chairman of their merchant bank.
44	8	"Public Concern"	Lennie Mayne	John Pennington	20 October 1974
A local petition protesting about Hammonds' lorries coincides with the firms moves to go public. But it is not only the residents the board has to face.
45	9	"The Race"	Roderick Graham	John Pennington	27 October 1974
David, with the company's sponsorship, has his first experience of driving in a race. In an atmosphere of tension and excitement, Jill watches his performance.
46	10	"Saturday"	George Spenton Foster	Eric Paice	3 November 1974
The men want a share of the fat profit they think Hammonds will make when they go public – if not, they may strike at a vital moment. Brian is involved in a serious car accident.
47	11	"The Guilt Beneath the Gingerbread"	Gerry Mill	Eric Paice	10 November 1974
The unrest at the depot continues – is Bill Riley behind it, trying to jeopardise the share issue?
48	12	"A Bad Mistake"	Roderick Graham	N. J. Crisp	17 November 1974
Edward meets prospective business world shareholders, but his frankness causes a setback.
49	13	"The Fall Guy"	Oliver Horsbrugh	N. J. Crisp	1 December 1974
The company goes public – in an atmosphere of tension the share issue is placed on the market.
50	14	"The Crucial Vote"	William Slater	N. J. Crisp	8 December 1974
Edward fights for survival as chairman and managing director of Hammond Transport Services Limited – and everyone's loyalty is tested to the full.

=== Series 5 (1975) ===
Broadcast on Sunday evenings on BBC1 from 7:25pm–8:15pm.

No. overall	No. in series	Title	Directed by	Written by	Original release date
51	1	"Life Goes On"	Lennie Mayne	N. J. Crisp	6 April 1975
The Hammond family has changed considerably in recent months, both publicly and privately, and their future is wholly uncertain.
52	2	"The Self-Made Cross"	Vere Lorrimer	N. J. Crisp	13 April 1975
David finally comes to terms with Jill's death, but the effects of Brian's divorce are about to reverberate into the future.
53	3	"Tiger by the Tail"	Lennie Mayne	N. J. Crisp	20 April 1975
Paul Merroney is proving to be a man of determined ambition with confident plans for Hammond Transport. Brian, however, is less sure of himself.
54	4	"Breakdown"	Vere Lorrimer	Eric Paice	27 April 1975
Combining business and pleasure during a skiing holiday in Switzerland, Edward checks out a depot in Geneva which Merroney is keen to buy. Jennifer interviews potential staff.
55	5	"Special Licence"	Lennie Mayne	Eric Paice	4 May 1975
While everyone's attention is on Edward and Jennifer's wedding, Paul Merroney tries to manipulate Brian's business affairs.
56	6	"Flight of Fancy"	Vere Lorrimer	Eric Paice	11 May 1975
During an early morning Board meeting, the Hammonds and Bill Riley learn that Merroney intends to bid on the same day for the ailing company. His work will be made difficult by a very tough lady – Jane Maxwell.
57	7	"A Very Short Honeymoon"	Lennie Mayne	Eric Paice	18 May 1975
On the surface, Mary seems to have accepted Jennifer as her daughter-in-law, but Edward doubts his mother's ability to avoid causing trouble.
58	8	"Big Deal"	Vere Lorrimer	N. J. Crisp	25 May 1975
The alterations of Edward and Jennifer's new home are well in hand, but however much they would like to relax in their new home, the demands of business are never far away.
59	9	"Package Deal"	Lennie Mayne	N. J. Crisp	1 June 1975
While Edward settles comfortably into marriage and David starts to enjoy life again, Paul Merroney quietly and skilfully begins to feather his own nest.
60	10	"End of a Dream"	Vere Lorrimer	N. J. Crisp	8 June 1975
Edward and Jennifer move into their new home. The furniture has been delivered, and the alterations are complete. All they need now is the go ahead to start a family.
61	11	"The Judas Sheep"	Lennie Mayne	N. J. Crisp	15 June 1975
Having settled into their new house and discovering they cannot have children, Jennifer and Edward decide to adopt. They little realise the difficulties they must first overcome.
62	12	"Jennifer's Baby"	Vere Lorrimer	Eric Paice	22 June 1975
Merroney returns from Lebanon, bringing with him the man he hopes will finance a new business deal. His interests seem to be with Clare Miller. Edward and Jennifer's only interest is their new baby.
63	13	"Warpath"	Lennie Mayne	Eric Paice	29 June 1975
An attempt by the Hammonds to oust Merroney is doomed to failure from the start. Is Merroney a natural winner or are the Hammonds born losers? There is plenty of evidence to support both points of view.

=== Series 6 (1976) ===
Broadcast on Sunday evenings on BBC1 from 7:25pm–8:15pm.

No. overall	No. in series	Title	Directed by	Written by	Original release date
64	1	"Red Sky at Night"	John Davies	Simon Raven	25 January 1976
Life has changed dramatically for the Hammond brothers. Edward is the father of an adopted son; Brian recovers from his divorce and a breakdown in Italy and David is finding his social feet.
65	2	"A Clean Break"	Christopher Baker	Douglas Watkinson	1 February 1976
Edward and Jennifer's worst fears have been realised, and William's natural mother has asked for him back. Jennifer is determined to keep him.
66	3	"Red Sky in the Morning"	Christopher Baker	Simon Raven	8 February 1976
Hammond Transport is on the threshold of expansion into Europe, beginning in France. David's enthusiasm for the place has more to do with Therese d'Alembert than with business opportunities.
67	4	"Oranges and Lemons"	John Davies	Simon Raven	15 February 1976
On their way back from France, David and Stacey have been searched by Customs officials at Dover. Everyone, particularly Paul Merroney, wonders why.
68	5	"When Will You Pay Me?"	Philip Dudley	Simon Raven	22 February 1976
Paul Merroney considers it is high time Edward resumed his responsibilities as Managing Director of Hammond Transport. He enlists Riley's help in the endeavour.
69	6	"Tender"	Timothy Combe	Eric Paice	29 February 1976
News that RAI Transport is going into liquidation smothers the Hammond grapevine and Jenny decides that here is her chance to prove what form she is in.
70	7	"The Mole"	Philip Dudley	Eric Paice	7 March 1976
Griffith Trevelyan, Chief Sales Executive of RAI Transport, the collapsing firm for whose oil rig installation the Hammonds wish to bid for, decides to play one contender off against another.
71	8	"The Chosen Victim"	Timothy Combe	N. J. Crisp	14 March 1976
Jane Maxwell senses trouble when a small aircraft belonging to Luxury Air, part of John Kirkman's vast private company, stops at Dover airfield ostensibly to refuel.
72	9	"Blood and Water"	Philip Dudley	Brian Finch	21 March 1976
John Kirkman has made an offer of 80p a share for Hammond Transport. The level has been cleverly pitched: not too high to arouse suspicion, not too low for Paul Merroney to ignore.
73	10	"The Devil You Know"	Timothy Combe	Brian Finch	28 March 1976
Since the Hammond board is evenly divided about Kirkman's offer, the final decision seems to rest with Paul Merroney. But can Sir Neville influence him?
74	11	"Try, Try Again"	Christopher Baker	Ray Jenkins	4 April 1976
The Hammond Board has rejected Kirkman's offer for the company, and this has meant quite a victory for Paul Merroney. But Brian feels that Hammonds need help if they are to function in Europe.
75	12	"The Bonus"	Timothy Combe	Ray Jenkins	11 April 1976
Although Brian and Edward have been discouraged from the idea of Hammonds merging with Van der Merwe, Paul Merroney is determined to find out exactly what the advantages would be.
76	13	"Birthday"	Christopher Baker	Ray Jenkins	18 April 1976
Two important occasions: the first is Mary's birthday, the second is a SGM of the Hammond shareholders, whose support for the merger with Van der Merwe, Paul Merroney wishes to obtain.

=== Series 7 (1976) ===
Broadcast on Sunday evenings on BBC1 from 7:25pm–8:15pm.

No. overall	No. in series	Title	Directed by	Written by	Original release date
77	1	"To Honour and Obey"	Timothy Combe	Ray Jenkins	5 September 1976
Hammonds Transport has merged with Van der Merwe. Merroney is marrying a banker's daughter, and today is the wedding day.
78	2	"Home and Away"	Mary Ridge	Ray Jenkins	12 September 1976
The honeymoon is over and it is business as usual. Ann Hammond visits and wants to see Brian, but Edward is not so sure.
79	3	"Invitations"	Timothy Combe	Ray Jenkins	19 September 1976
Ann turns up to see Brian and all the family is drawn into her search for reassurance.
80	4	"The Female of the Species"	Mary Ridge	Brian Finch	26 September 1976
Jenny is off to Canada and Merroney to Amsterdam again, leaving Edward and April at a loose end.
81	5	"Manoeuvres"	Timothy Combe	Brian Finch	3 October 1976
David makes another attempt to get the better of Paul Merroney... All he needs is Simon Winter's backing.
82	6	"Arrivals and Departures"	Mary Ridge	Elaine Morgan	10 October 1976
Merroney pushes Hammond Brothers into further plans for expansion, but a family bereavement reveals a new callous aspect to his character.
83	7	"The Distaff Side"	Christopher Baker	Elaine Morgan	17 October 1976
A premature board meeting is far from being a routine matter. It holds several surprises... David has sent a letter of resignation.
84	8	"Cross Currents"	Mary Ridge	Elaine Morgan	24 October 1976
Mary returns from convalescence to find her family united in their opposition to Merroney's expansionist plans for the company - but emotionally in disarray.
85	9	"Ripples"	Christopher Baker	Brian Finch	31 October 1976
Merroney, aware that a majority of the Hammond board will vote against his Middle East scheme, decides to pre-empt them, and Jennifer's outburst has unforeseen consequences.
86	10	"Celebration"	Mary Ridge	Brian Finch	7 November 1976
The new freight planes are ready for delivery. To celebrate the occasion Jane throws a party, at which April appears to be getting on famously with her escort until the unexpected arrival of Merroney.
87	11	"Windmills"	Christopher Baker	Brian Finch	14 November 1976
One of the new freight planes has failed to reach its destination. The loss is covered by insurance - or is it?
88	12	"The Golden Road"	Mary Ridge	Brian Finch	21 November 1976
Hammond board members cast their votes on the Middle East project. The outcome is 2-4 against, and Merroney needs to level up the odds.
89	13	"Out of the Blue"	Christopher Baker	N. J. Crisp	28 November 1976
Will the bank lend Hammonds the money they need? Or will Merroney have to put into action Plan No 2? The cost - the family could finally lose control of the company.
90	14	"The Knock on The Door"	Mary Ridge	N. J. Crisp	5 December 1976
Merroney's tactics force Mary to call a family meeting. She is fighting a last-ditch battle to prevent the Hammonds losing control of their company... meanwhile Merroney is in danger of losing a more personal battle.
91	15	"The Ordeal"	Christopher Baker	N. J. Crisp	12 December 1976
The Rileys' son, Ronald, has been involved in an accident. Gwen is summoned to the hospital and with Bill still away she keeps a lonely and anxious vigil. Will Ronnie's injuries be serious? Where is Bill?
92	16	"The Christmas Party"	Mary Ridge	N. J. Crisp	19 December 1976
At the firm's Christmas party Mary recognises fewer people. She is witness to the fact that the firm is changing. The business is slipping from family control as, apparently, is the family from hers.

== DVD releases ==
In October 2017, the complete series of The Brothers was released in the UK as a 27-disc DVD box set, released by Simply Media. The seven different series had previously been released on DVD individually by Simply Media from October 2015 to July 2017.

In October 2006, Series 1 of The Brothers had originally been released on DVD by DD Home Entertainment, and for nine years from 2006-2015 only Series 1 had been available on DVD.

DVD name	Release date
Series 1	23 October 2006 (re-released on 5 October 2015)
Series 2	9 November 2015
Series 3	28 November 2016
Series 4	9 January 2017
Series 5	27 March 2017
Series 6	12 June 2017
Series 7	10 July 2017
The Complete Collection: Series 1–7	16 October 2017
