= Laurence Olivier Award for Supporting Artist of the Year =

Retired award for London theatre

- Awarded for: Supporting Artist of the Year
- Location: England
- Presented by: Society of London Theatre
- First award: 1976
- Final award: 1976
- Website: officiallondontheatre.com/olivier-awards/

The Laurence Olivier Award for Supporting Artist of the Year was a one-off award presented by the Society of London Theatre in recognition of the "world-class status of London theatre." The awards were established as the Society of West End Theatre Awards in 1976, and named in 1984 in honour of English actor and director Laurence Olivier.

This commingled actor/actress award, only ever presented at the 1976 inaugural awards, was presented to an actress.

== Winners and nominees ==
=== 1970s ===
Year	Actor	Play	Character
1976
1976	Margaret Courtenay	Separate Tables	Mrs Railton-Bell
1976	Bill Fraser	The Fool, M. Perrichon's Travels, Twelfth Night and The Circle	Admiral Radstock / Photographer / Toby Belch / Lord Porteous
1976	Trevor Peacock	Henry IV, Parts 1 and 2 and The Merry Wives of Windsor	Poins / Sir Hugh Evans
1976	André van Gyseghem	Henry IV, Parts 1 and 2 and Hamlet	Baron Tito Belcredi / Polonius

== See also ==
- Drama Desk Award for Outstanding Featured Actor in a Play
- Drama Desk Award for Outstanding Featured Actress in a Play
- Lists of acting awards
- List of awards for supporting actor
- Tony Award for Best Featured Actor in a Play
- Tony Award for Best Featured Actress in a Play
