= Spring & Port Wine (film) =

Spring and Port Wine
- DVD cover
- Directed by: Peter Hammond
- Written by: Bill Naughton
- Based on: Spring and Port Wine; 1967 play by Bill Naughton
- Produced by: Michael Medwin
- Starring: James Mason; Susan George
- Cinematography: Norman Warwick
- Edited by: Fergus McDonell
- Music by: Douglas Gamley
- Production company: Memorial Enterprises
- Distributed by: Anglo-Amalgamated Film Distributors
- Release date: 19 February 1970
- Running time: 101 minutes
- Country: United Kingdom
- Language: English
- Budget: £198,000

Spring and Port Wine is a 1970 British film starring James Mason based on the play of the same title.

== Plot ==
Rafe Crompton works in a weaving mill. He is a proud man but not a rich man. He lives in a garden city–style council house beyond the standard brick terraces of the town. At the end of the week he gathers the various wages from his children and passes the money to his wife Daisy who, with eldest daughter Florence, keeps the family budget in order, often lending her mother the small sum required to balance the housekeeping book. However, Daisy is prone to making allowances for unexpected pecuniary challenges; at the beginning of the film she feels forced to lend a neighbour cash to avoid the repossession of a hire purchase TV, although she initially refuses the neighbour (Mrs Duckworth) a loan, thus enraging Mrs Duckworth who went on to chide Daisy for allowing her husband to micromanage the housekeeping, which she considers to be women's work.

This prompts Daisy to borrow the money from her son when he gets home to give Mrs Duckworth and save her from the drunken ire of a Mr Duckworth finding the telly gone.

At the family Friday evening meal (‘tea’), the Crompton couple reminisce about the economic depression that drove some people to suicide, drowning themselves in the local canal. Their younger daughter Hilda refuses to eat the herring which has been prepared for "tea". Her father determines to serve it to her every day until she eats it.

Sons Harold and Wilfred are shocked when a box is delivered containing a fine overcoat together with a receipt for 40 guineas.

Mr Crompton likes the family to stand around the piano and sing hymns.

The herring issue comes to a head when the herring disappears. It is found outside being eaten by the cat. Mr Crompton does not believe the herring was taken by the cat. He makes Wilfred swear on the Bible that he did not move the herring. Wilfred faints under the pressure. This leads to both daughters leaving: Florence goes to live with her fiancé Arthur, while Hilda goes to stay with the neighbours, the Duckworths. This proves to be a step down rather than up.

Mr Duckworth sits around in a filthy vest making demands on his long-suffering wife while his daughter eats a banana wrapped in bread. It appears that Hilda is pregnant. Her mother pawns the new overcoat for money to help her. Mrs Duckworth shows her how to break into the bureau to get at the cash box. The family starts to crumble when Mr Crompton discovers the losses.

A chance incident occurs as Mrs Crompton hopes to get the coat out of pawn. Rafe realises his raincoat has a missing button and he goes back upstairs to find the expensive overcoat instead, at the misguided urging of his sons.

Realising she is about to be caught out, and fearing the worst, Mrs Crompton runs off out into the rain. Rafe runs after her and finds her staring into the canal, clearly contemplating suicide. He says he doesn't care about the coat or the money, and explains that his penny-pinching is due to childhood horrors experienced by his parents being in debt, and his mother nearly gassing herself as a result.

Meanwhile, the boys pack and prepare to also leave.

As Mr and Mrs Crompton walk home, everything is resolved. He even considers that Hilda refused to eat her herring because she is pregnant, comparing her to when his wife was pregnant. Rafe says that he will give Hilda his love and protection if she is pregnant. At home he confesses that he has always known of her trickery with the housekeeping money, but as a sign of trust gives her the key to the bureau and cashbox. Florence is persuaded to stay home until she marries. They know Hilda is pregnant but ask her to also stay. She accepts. The boys are free to leave but choose not to.

Mr Crompton plays the piano and Hilda sings a hymn, while the rest of the family gather round on the chairs in the living room. They are all reunited again.

== Cast ==
- James Mason as Rafe Crompton
- Diana Coupland as Daisy Crompton
- Susan George as Hilda Crompton
- Rodney Bewes as Harold Crompton
- Hannah Gordon as Florence Crompton
- Len Jones as Wilfred Crompton
- Keith Buckley as Arthur Gasket
- Avril Elgar as Betsy-Jane Duckworth
- Adrienne Posta as Betty Duckworth
- Frank Windsor as Ned Duckworth
- Arthur Lowe as Mr. Aspinall
- Marjorie Rhodes as Mrs. Gasket
- Bernard Bresslaw as Lorry Driver
- Joseph Greig as Allan (TV man)
- Christopher Timothy as Joe (TV man)
- Ken Parry as Pawnbroker
- Reg Green, Jack Howarth, Bryan Pringle and John Sharp as Bowlers
- Bernard Smidowicz as Van Driver

== Production ==
The play was based on a radio play that already been filmed twice for television. The stage play version debuted in 1965, sponsored by Memorial Enterprises, a company founded by Albert Finney and Michael Medwin to make films, television and stage plays. Spring and Port Wine was a huge success on the British stage. Memorial moved into filmmaking with If.... and Charlie Bubbles and wanted to make a film of Spring and Port Wine. "I suppose it has always been in my mind to film it," said Medwin. In November 1968 Medwin said the film version would be called Dance to Your Daddy.

Due to the success of the play there was some American interest in financing a film version. EMI, under Bernard Delfont, had taken over Associated British Pictures, whose companies included an independent unit, Nat Cohen's Anglo-Amalgamated. Only a few days of becoming chairman of Associated, Delfont agreed to finance Spring and Port Wine. In the end two-thirds of the budget was provided by Anglo-EMI, which was the new name for Nat Cohen's subsidiary of EMI Films.

Director Peter Hammond came from television. James Mason said he accepted the role in part because "I have been looking for films financed by European money and I have not made a film in this country for two years because I resent working on projects that are financed by American money. Films are so personal to a country that they should take on exclusively the character of that country."

=== Shooting ===
Filming took place from May to June 1969, in the studio and on location. The movie was the first film shot at Elstree Studios after Bryan Forbes took over EMI Films. The location scenes were shot in Bolton in May 1969 and the family house is 51 Grisdale Road. It was filmed whilst many of the old industrial buildings remained and as St. Peters Way was being constructed, and the film includes panoramic shots of an early stage of work on that part of the new road adjacent to St Peter's Church, where it follows the former course of the River Croal and the Bolton arm of the Manchester, Bolton and Bury Canal.

After filming ended, it was announced the film would be the first to be released under the banner of EMI Films. (Other early films were Eyewitness and All the Way Up.)

== Reception ==
The Guardian called it "not really a very good film in spite of James Mason's unwavering presence" but "it's a perfectly watchable piece of North Country flannel." Sight and Sound called it a "sentimental adaptation" in which "the cast make what they can of a script whose sugary pathos belongs more to Victorian melodrama than to anything resembling modern times."

Variety called it "an unpretentious opening entry, but it is extremely well produced and has a warmth and integrity that make a pleasantly entertaining switch from some of the flash cynical offerings of today."

The film was not a success at the box office. Filmink suggested that the film might have been made a few years too late.
