= Alfie Darling =

1975 British film by Ken Hughes

- Theatrical release poster
- Directed by: Ken Hughes
- Screenplay by: Ken Hughes
- Based on: Alfie Darling by Bill Naughton
- Produced by: Dugald Rankin
- Starring: Alan Price; Jill Townsend; Joan Collins; Annie Ross; Sheila White; Hannah Gordon
- Cinematography: Ousama Rawi
- Edited by: John Trumper
- Music by: Alan Price
- Production company: Signal Pictures
- Distributed by: EMI Film Distributors
- Release date: 6 March 1975 (London)
- Running time: 102 minutes
- Country: United Kingdom
- Language: English
- Budget: £500,000

Alfie Darling (also known as Oh Alfie! and Oh Alfie) is a 1975 British comedy-drama film written and directed by Ken Hughes, and starring Alan Price, Jill Townsend, Paul Copley and Joan Collins. It is the sequel to Alfie (1966), with Alan Price taking over Michael Caine's role. It is based on the 1970 novel of the same name by Bill Naughton (who wrote the play upon which the first film was based). Price also wrote the title song. The film premiered at the Universal Cinema in London on 6 March 1975.

== Plot ==
After experiencing a failure in the ending of the earlier film, Alfie – now working as a London to France HGV driver alongside Bakey – decides to get back to his old self. And his new occupation provides new opportunities to do so. The film starts as Bakey drives the truck through customs in France, while Alfie has sex with an English hitchhiker (listed in the cast as 'Bird') in the back of the vehicle until a customs' officer catches her topless.

When arriving at their destination, he spots a woman in a sports car. They start racing until the police break it up. Alfie soon finds comfort by flirting with the married waitress Louise, who takes him to her apartment. During the night, her husband returns from his fishing trip, but Bakey, outside in the truck, sounds the horn as a warning.

Alfie later catches up with the woman from the race and learns her name is Abby and that she is a sophisticated magazine editor. When she turns him down, he proceeds to stalk her until, after another car chase, she finally agrees to a date. When Alfie gets his wish, he suffers erectile dysfunction and leaves her apartment in anger.

This failure causes him to use his little black book to contact women with whom he has a casual relationship. However, some of these encounters lead him into trouble. He faces the consequences of an encounter with Norma and the wrath of the husband of older Fay, when said husband discovers Alfie's wallet under their bed.

With Fay's encouragement, Alfie apologizes to Abby about leaving her apartment in a huff and asks her for a proper dinner.

On a holiday in France, he tells her what he never says to his lovers – that he loves her and wants her to marry him. She initially refuses. Alfie angrily insists that he has asked her to marry him, demanding to know what the hell is wrong with her that she refused. As he leaves their hotel room, he tells her that if she is making an idiot of him, he will kill her.

Back in the UK, Alfie suffers a minor accident and is bed-ridden. Abby pays him a visit to apologise for refusing his marriage proposal, and expresses her acceptance. She then has to take a quick work-related flight.

When Abby leaves for the airport, Alfie's older neighbour, Claire, hears from another neighbour that Alfie can't move, she lets herself into his apartment and serves him tea. When Alfie comments on Claire's perfume, she reveals her true feelings for him by suddenly entering his bed and taking her top off. She ignores his protests but then her attempts to mount him fix his back, and he escapes before she succeeds in making actual intimate contact.

Alfie catches Abby before her flight takes off, and they decide to marry the following day. In the morning Alfie waits for her in the airport, not having heard that her plane has crashed without any survivors. Upon learning the news, Alfie drives to the crash site and cries over the wreckage.

== Cast ==
- Alan Price as Alfie Elkins
- Jill Townsend as Abby Summers
- Paul Copley as Bakey
- Joan Collins as Fay
- Sheila White as Norma
- Annie Ross as Claire
- Hannah Gordon as Dora
- Rula Lenska as Louise
- Minah Bird as Gloria
- Derek Smith as Harold
- Vicki Michelle as Bird
- Brian Wilde as doctor
- Jenny Hanley as receptionist
- Patsy Kensit as Penny

== Production ==
The film is based on the 1970 novel Alfie Darling by Bill Naughton. It is a sequel to Alfie, which had been a radio play, then play and film.

Film rights were purchased in August 1970 by Joseph Janni and Anglo-EMI then under Nat Cohen. "I am delighted that Joe Janni has rejoined the fold", said Cohen, who had made several films with the producer. "We promise to give audiences a funny, tender and moving film." In January 1971, Michael Caine said he was open to starring in the film, stating "So much happened to me after Alfie maybe a lot more glorious things could happen after a sequel." Filmink called the idea "terrible".

In May 1973, Nat Cohen announced the film would be made as part of a slate of seven movies worth £5 million in all. Cohen said a lead had not been found for Alfie Darling, adding, "We are still hoping Michael Caine will do it for us. If we can get the right script and present it to him I think there is a chance he may agree. But if we cannot get Mike it will be someone of that stature."

Producer Dugald Rankin said the same month that they were looking for an actor younger than Caine and that five actors had been approached but no decision had been made on casting/

Patrick Mower says Ken Hughes offered him the role and Mower was going to play it, but then the producer's "12 year old daughter" saw Alan Price on Top of the Pops and recommended Price play the role. Price's casting was announced in June 1974. Price was a singer who had featured prominently in O Lucky Man! (1973) but who had not acted in a film before. Price said, "When I was first offered the part I had to weigh up the odds of what sort of job I could do. I came to the conclusion that with plenty of assistance from the director and a little help from some of my friends I could win through."

Filming started 27 August 1974 and took place in London, Brighton and Southampton, in addition to two weeks' filming in Le Havre, France.

== Critical reception ==
The film was described by a Punch reviewer as a "prize catastrophe". He was critical of Price's performance and described the idea of making him a leading man as "misbegotten."

Time Out called the film "an advert with no product to sell."

The Monthly Film Bulletin criticised the film's "coarse triviality."

Derek Malcolm in The Guardian wrote that the film was "pitched. .. on the level of Confessions of a Window Cleaner (1974)" and said it was "regrettably difficult to find many kind words to say about" the movie.

FilmInk said it "suffers very, very, very badly in comparison to the original, which turned Michael Caine into a star (you may feel differently if you like Alan Price)."
