= William Squire =

Welsh actor (1917–1989)

William Arthur Squire
- Born: 29 April 1917; Neath, Glamorgan, Wales
- Died: 3 May 1989 (aged 72); London, England
- Occupation: Actor
- Years active: 1951–1988
- Spouses: Betty Dixon; Juliet Harmer (1967–1989)

William Arthur Squire (29 April 1917 – 3 May 1989) was a Welsh actor of stage, film and television.

== Career ==
As a stage actor, Squire performed at Stratford-upon-Avon and at the Old Vic, and notably replaced his fellow-countryman Richard Burton as King Arthur in Camelot at the Majestic Theatre on Broadway. One of his first film appearances was in the 1956 film Alexander the Great, which starred Burton in the title role.

Squire had many roles in television and movies over his career, including Thomas More in the 1969 film version of Maxwell Anderson's play Anne of the Thousand Days; Sir Daniel Brackley in the 1972 television adaptation of Robert Louis Stevenson's The Black Arrow; the voice of Gandalf in the 1978 animated version of The Lord of the Rings; and the Shadow in the 1979 Doctor Who serial The Armageddon Factor. According to the website Television Heaven, Squire's best-known role was the spy chief code-named Hunter in the British series Callan. Squire's Hunter was the fourth, and longest-lasting, in the main series, taking over the role from Derek Bond.

In a set of Encyclopædia Britannica-produced educational films about William Shakespeare's Macbeth, Squire played the role of Macbeth. This was in keeping with his long career as a Shakespearean actor, which included roles in the classic 1960s TV series, An Age of Kings. Squire also played Leontes in the Marlowe Society recording of The Winter's Tale.

On 15 June 1967, the St. John's College choir at University of Cambridge recorded A Meditation on Christ's Nativity. Squire read several poems, including The Annunciation by John Donne and A Dialogue by George Herbert, and 1 John 1:1-10 from the New English Bible for the album.

In the late 1960s Squire narrated a series of radio advertisements for Findus Foods under the pseudonym Frobisher Collingwood. The advertisements were played on Radio Caroline. According to Squire's son Nick, the idea to use a pseudonym was a joke between Squire and his friend Hugh Bredin, who wrote the advertisements, with the name itself being a combination of two telephone exchanges in London at the time.

== Personal life ==
Squire was born on 29 April 1917 in Neath, Glamorgan, to William Squire and his wife Martha (née Bridgeman).

He was first married to the actress Betty Dixon. He later married the actress Juliet Harmer in 1967.

There is a park bench on Hampstead Heath dedicated to him.

Squire died on 3 May 1989 in London, England, 4 days after his 72nd birthday.

== Filmography ==
Year	Title	Role	Notes
1951	The Long Dark Hall	Sgt. Cochran	
1956	The Man Who Never Was	Lt. Jewell	
1956	Alexander the Great	Aeschenes	
1956	The Battle of the River Plate	Ray Martin	
1958	Dunkirk	Captain	Uncredited
1958	Innocent Sinners	Father Lambert	Uncredited
1967	A Challenge for Robin Hood	Sir John	
1968	Where Eagles Dare	Capt. Lee Thomas	
1969	Anne of the Thousand Days	Thomas More	
1978	The Lord of the Rings	Gandalf	Voice
1978	The Thirty Nine Steps	Harkness	
1988	Testimony	Khatchaturyan	

== Television ==
Year	Title	Role	Notes
1954-1958	BBC Sunday Night Theatre	Various	5 episodes
1956	The Adventures of Robin Hood	Vef	Episode: "The Byzantine Treasure"
1956-1959	ITV Television Playhouse	Various	4 episodes
1957-1963	ITV Play of the Week	Various	4 episodes
1959	The Invisible Man	Waring	Episode: "The Big Plot"
1960	Boyd Q.C.	Mr. Corby	Episode: "Uncle George"
1961	The House Under the Water	Griffith Tregaron	Miniseries
1961	BBC Sunday-Night Play	Dr. Terry	Episode: "Scene of the Accident"
1967	Softly, Softly	Dr. Kelper	Episode: "Cash on Deliverance"
1967	Armchair Theatre	Paolo Bracchina	Episode: "Quite an Ordinary Knife"
1969	The Champions	Duncan	Episode: "Nutcracker"
1969	The Wednesday Play	Reverend Elwyn Wilderness	Episode: "Blowden, Home from Rachel's Marriage"
1969	ITV Playhouse	Max	Episode: "Like Puppies in a Basket"
1969	Paul Temple	Howard Horton	Episode: "Which One of Us Is Me?"
1969-1970	ITV Saturday Night Theatre	Nick Slater/Alec Kooning	2 episodes
1970	Randall and Hopkirk (Deceased)	Sam Seymour	Episode: "A Sentimental Journey"
1970-1972	Callan	Hunter	Seasons 3-4
1972	Jason King	Colonel Sardner	Episode: "The Stones of Venice"
1973	Spy Trap	Nigel Stewart	Episode: "Sale of Work"
1975	The Venturers	Sir George Fielding	Miniseries
1976	Play for Today	Arnold	Episode: "Buffet"
1977	The XYY Man	Laidlaw	4 episodes
1978	Off to Philadelphia in the Morning	Daniel Parry	3 episodes
1978	All Creatures Great and Small	Roderick Perowne	Episode: "Attendant Problems"
1978	Les Misérables	Magistrate	TV film
1979	Blake's 7	Kommissar	Episode: "Horizon"
1979	Doctor Who	The Shadow	Serial: "The Armageddon Factor"
1981	When the Boat Comes In	John Hartley	2 episodes
1981	The Life and Times of David Lloyd George	Dr. Clifford	Episode: "He is Wise and Merciful"
1982	The Hound of the Baskervilles	Mr. Frankland	1 episode
1982	Marco Polo	Inn-Keeper	1 episode
1984	Look and Read	Sam North	Serial: "Badger Girl"
1985	Late Starter	Vice-Chancellor	First episode
1988	Rumpole of the Bailey	Sir Daniel Derwent	Episode: "Rumpole and the Quality of Life"
