= Bill Naughton =

Irish-British playwright and author

- Bill and Erna Naughton, photographed by Colin O'Brien, 1962
- Born: William John Francis Naughton; 12 June 1910; Devlis, Ballyhaunis, County Mayo, Ireland
- Died: 9 January 1992 (aged 81); Ballasalla, Isle of Man
- Occupations: Playwright; screenwriter; novelist
- Spouses: Anne Wilcock (m. 1930; div. 1950); Erna Naughton (m. 1952)
- Partner: Gertrude Wagner
- Children: 3
- Writing career
- Genre: Fiction

William John Francis "Bill" Naughton (12 June 1910 – 9 January 1992) was an Irish-born British playwright, screenwriter and novelist, best known for his 1963 play Alfie.

== Early life ==
Naughton was born William John Francis Naughton on 12 June 1910 in the townland of Devlis in Ballyhaunis, County Mayo to Thomas Naughton (1873–1957), a shopkeeper and railway worker, and Maria Naughton (née Fleming; 1875–1949). The fourth of six siblings, Naughton was raised in a Catholic household.

In 1914, the family settled in Bolton, England where Naughton's father began working as a coal miner. Educated at Saint Peter and Paul's School, Naughton left school when he was 14 years old and began working in a weaving shed. Later working as a labourer, by 1930 Naughton was working as a coal-bagger and driver for the Bolton Co-operative Society. In 1930, Naughton married the cotton mill worker Anne Wilcock (1905–1985). The couple had three children, of which one died in infancy.

== Writing career ==
After reading a newspaper article about Mass-Observation (MO) research project in which a coal miner gave an account of his day, Naughton joined the Worktown study of Bolton in 1938. One of the MO's first working-class observers, Naughton's insights as a coal driver proved especially helpful to the sociologist and economist Gertrude Wagner. (Note: In Britain Wagner was known by the anglicised "Gertrude".) Naughton played a key role in providing information about the families he visited for Wagner's studies on the emotional substructure of working class life. During the study Naughton and Wagner began an affair. (Note: According to a 1978 interview with Dennis Chapman, Naughton and Wagner had several children.)

Following the outbreak of the Second World War Naughton declared himself a conscientious objector. Naughton was made redundant from Bolton Co-operative Society, and soon after separated from Wilcock. (Note: Although separated, Naughton and Wilcock didn't divorce until 1950.) Briefly living in Manchester, Naughton settled in London in 1941 where he worked as a driver for the Civil Defence Service. He also took to writing, publishing his first stories in 1943, in the London Evening News. Subsequent stories were published in Lilliput and broadcast on BBC radio, leading Madge to commission a book from him, the result being the very successful A Roof Over your Head (1945), Naughton's first volume of autobiography. This led to other commissions, including an article called 'The spiv', which brought the then obscure word into popular usage. His stage play, Alfie, adapted for the 1966 film starring Michael Caine in the eponymous role, originated in a radio play, Alfie Elkins and His Little Life, first broadcast on the BBC Third Programme in 1962, which became a production at the Mermaid Theatre in 1963. It transferred to the West End before a very brief run on Broadway. Naughton was a prolific writer of plays, novels, short stories and children's books. His preferred environment was working-class society, which is reflected in much of his written work.

In addition to Alfie, two of his other plays have been made into feature films, All in Good Time (1963), filmed as The Family Way (1966), starring John Mills, and Spring and Port Wine (1970), starring James Mason in the role of Rafe Crompton, an adaptation of a play first performed in 1959.

His novel Alfie Darling, the sequel to his earlier novel and play, was also filmed, with Alan Price succeeding Michael Caine in the lead role. Both Alfie and Alfie Darling were drawn upon for the 2004 film with Jude Law in the eponymous role.

His work also includes the novel One Small Boy (1957), and the collection of short stories The Goalkeeper's Revenge And Other Stories (1961). His 1977 children's novel My Pal Spadger is an account of his childhood in 1920s Bolton. His wife died in 2014 aged 85.

Many of his plays were performed at the Octagon Theatre, Bolton. An 85-seat adaptable studio theatre within the Octagon is named after him.

== Personal life ==
Naughton married Ernestine "Erna" Naughton (née Pirolt; 1929–2014), an Austrian nurse and later patron of the Kenny/Naughton Autumn School, on 9 September 1952.

On 9 January 1992, Naughton died aged 81 in Ballasalla, Isle of Man. A "Bill Naughton Short Story Competition", administered by The Kenny/Naughton Autumn School, was named in his honour.

== Awards ==
During his lifetime, he received the following awards:

- Screenwriters Guide Award (1967 and 1968)
- Italia Prize for Radio Play (1974)
- Children's Rights Workshop Other Award (1978)
- Portico Literary Prize (1987)
- The Hon. Fellowship, Bolton Institute of Higher Education (1988).

== Bibliography ==
=== Plays ===
- My Flesh, My Blood (1957) (revised as Spring and Port Wine)
- Alfie (1963) (adapted for 1966 film Alfie)
- All in Good Time (1963) (adapted for 1966 film The Family Way)
- He Was Gone When We Got There (1966)
- June Evening (1966)
- Spring and Port Wine (1967) (adapted for 1970 film Spring and Port Wine)
- Keep It in the Family (1967) (Americanized version of Spring and Port Wine)
- Annie And Fanny (1967)
- Lighthearted Intercourse (1971)
- Derby Day (1994)

=== Novels ===
- A Roof Over Your Head (1945)
- Pony Boy (1946)
- Rafe Granite (1947)
- One Small Boy (1957)
- Alfie (1966)
- Alfie Darling (1970)
- My Pal Spadger (1977)

=== Short story collections ===
- The Bedside Lilliput (Hulton Press, 1950) [anthology inc. "Air On G String"]
- Late Night on Watling Street (1959)
- The Goalkeeper's Revenge (1961)
- The Bees Have Stopped Working: And Other Stories (1976)
- Spit Nolan (1988)
- Ricky, Karim and Spit Nolan: Adventure Short Stories (2003) (with Jenny Alexander, Pratima Mitchell)

=== Autobiography ===
- On the Pig’s Back: An Autobiographical Excursion. Oxford: Oxford U.P.(1987)
- Saintly Billy: A Catholic Boyhood. Oxford: Oxford U.P.(1988)
- Neither Use Nor Ornament: A Memoir of Bolton: 1920s. Newcastle upon Tyne: Bloodaxe.(1995)
