= Alfie (play) =

1963 play by Bill Naughton

- Written by: Bill Naughton
- Characters: Alfie Elkins
- Original language: English
- Genre: Drama, comedy
- Setting: In and around South London of the present day

Premiere
- Date premiered: 1963

Alfie is a 1963 stage play written by Bill Naughton. Developed from a radio drama, the original London production starred John Neville, and the Broadway transfer starred Terence Stamp.

The play recounts the life of a working-class London ladies man, Alfie Elkins, and the many women who pass through his life. The play was adapted into a film twice, a 1966 version starring Michael Caine and a 2004 version starring Jude Law, with the location switched to Manhattan and the character being an ex-pat Cockney.

== Origins ==
The character originated in a play for the BBC Third Programme entitled Alfie Elkins and His Little Life first broadcast on 7 January 1962. The life of Alfie (born about 1916) is retold from the early days of World War II to the late 1950s. In this version, the character was played by Bill Owen, later known for his role in Last of the Summer Wine. In the radio play, according to Robert Murphy in Sixties British Cinema, the character is placed in the world of spivs and semi-criminality rather than the swinging London of the first film. Murphy describes the character's personality in this version as possessing "an almost psychopathic vulgarity which links women, clothes and cars as commodities to be flaunted to prove to the world that he has achieved success without the privileges of birth or education".

Bernard Miles of the Mermaid Theatre commissioned Naughton to adapt his radio play for the stage.

== Original production ==
Directed by Donald McWhinnie, the play ran at London's Mermaid Theatre from 19 June - 13 July 1963. It then transferred to the Duchess Theatre in the West End, where it opened on 22 July and closed on 30 November 1963.

- Alfie - John Neville
- Young Alfie - Arthur Mallen
- Annie - Mary Hanefey
- Ruby - Margaret Courteney
- Carla - Wendy Varnals
- Flo - Edna Landor
- Gilda - Gemma Jones
- Guv’nor / Mr Smith - Norman Wynne
- Harry Clamacraft - George Waring
- Humphrey/Sharpey - David Battley
- Joe - Jerry Verno
- Lacey - Patrick Connor
- Lily Clamacraft - Marcia Ashton
- Lofty - Alan Townsend
- Perc - Patrick Mower
- Siddie - Glenda Jackson
- Woman Doctor - Audine Leith

Norman Wynne was cast as the abortionist. To gain a licence from the Lord Chamberlain's Office, then required for the play to be legally performed in the UK, the abortion had to occur off-stage. In the original script it was to take place behind a screen, but the censors readers' report commented it was "complete with groans and cries of pain, which I cannot think can be allowed". Among other changes, it was required that in the production "There must not be any jingle of instruments" and "Mr Smith scrubbing away is not to be seen or heard".

Harold Hobson wrote positively of the play in his review for The Sunday Times published on 4 August 1963:

"Some of the scenes are melodramatic. ... Many episodes, however, are remarkably good. The best two are Alfie's official medical examination and preparation for and the aftermath of the abortion. ... It would seem improbable that an abortion scene should be dramatic, terrible and beautiful. This one is all three. Here only does Alfie, in a disjointed, uninhibited and profoundly moving and disturbing speech, see right into himself."

Hobson described Alfie's monologue as "the high point of the play and of Mr. Neville's performance."

== Broadway production ==
Directed by Gilchrist Calder, Alfie opened at New York's Morosco Theatre on 17 December 1964, and closed on 2 January 1965 after 21 performances.

- Alfie - Terence Stamp
- Lily Clamacraft - Marcia Ashton
- Ruby - Margaret Courtenay
- Humphrey - Jeremy Geidt
- Annie - Mary Hanefey
- Mr. Smith - George S. Irving
- Gilda - Juliet Mills
- Joe - Jerry Verno
- Carla - Carol Booth
- Harry Clamacraft - Donald Ewer
- Perc - Peter Fenton
- Woman Doctor - Vanya Franck
- Lofty - James Luisi
- Siddie - Joanna Morris
- Flo - Sasha von Scherler

Naughton's 1992 obituary in The New York Times reported that the play had received extremely positive reviews despite the short run.

== Other productions ==
The play was revived at the Octagon, Bolton in 2012 with David Ricardo-Pearce in the lead. Lyn Gardner in The Guardian, reviewing this production, wrote that the consequences of Alfie's actions begin to turn the drama into "a morality play, albeit one in which the (anti)hero addresses the audience directly to explain his philosophy of life. That device, and a taut, tight scene with a back-street abortionist hint at what this play might have been, and could perhaps be in a pared-down and edited version." As it is, the play, "like Alfie, feels like a bit of dinosaur".
