= Dafydd Gruffydd =

Welsh television producer and director (1911-1982)

- Born: 1911; Cardiff, Wales, United Kingdom
- Died: 1982 (aged 70–71); Glamorgan, Wales, United Kingdom
- Occupations: Producer, director
- Years active: 1954-1967 (TV)

Dafydd Gruffydd (1911–1982) was a Welsh television producer and television director. He made a number of literary adaptations for BBC Wales including How Green Was My Valley (1960) and The House Under the Water (1961).

== Bibliography ==
- Geraint Evans & Helen Fulton. The Cambridge History of Welsh Literature. Cambridge University Press, 2019.
