= Dennis Chapman =

Dennis Chapman (1911–2003) was a British social psychologist best known for his book The Home and Social Status, published in 1955, which investigated the British working class domesticity in the mid-twentieth century. His research focuses mainly on two primary aspects of society: domestic housing and provision, and the sociology of crime.

Chapman studied social psychology at the London School of Economics and went on to work as a lecturer at the University of Liverpool between 1946 and 1977, eventually becoming the Director of Business Studies.

In October, 1935 he became involved in a research project concerning the effects of unemployment in Dundee, one of Scotland's largest cities. He later participated in a social fieldwork project called the "Mass Observation 'Worktown' Project" alongside Tom Harrisson and Humphrey Jennings, two of the founders of Mass-Observation.

Chapman wrote a third book about the widespread stereotype of criminals.
