= That Good Night =

Play by NJ Crisp

- Original language: English
- Written by: N. J. Crisp
- Characters: 5
- Genre: Drama
- Setting: A villa in Umbria, Italy

Premiere
- Date: 2 April 1996
- Place: Yvonne Arnaud Theatre, Guildford

That Good Night is a play by NJ Crisp, written with the intention of it being performed by Donald Sinden and his son Marc Sinden playing the central characters of the father and son. However Marc, who in 1991 had starred in Crisps' psychological thriller Dangerous Obsession, decided to produce it instead and so it became his first play as a Theatrical Producer.

The title is taken from the poem by Dylan Thomas:

"Do not go gentle into that good night,
Old age should burn and rave at close of day;
Rage, rage against the dying of the light."

== Original cast ==
It opened at the Yvonne Arnaud Theatre, Guildford on 2 April 1996 with the following cast (in order of appearance):

- Lucy Fleming as Anna
- Patrick Ryecart as Michael
- Julie-Kate Olivier as Debbie
- Donald Sinden as Ralph
- Nigel Davenport as The Visitor

== Plot ==
Ralph is a successful screenwriter, charming, cantankerous, rude and a bully; in his time an avid womaniser and completely selfish. Now in his seventies and terminally ill, he has two final missions: to be reconciled to his long-abandoned son Michael and secretly to ensure he is not a burden to his younger, devoted and second wife Anna as he goes "into that good night". But when Michael arrives at the beautiful Tuscan villa for their first meeting in many years, Ralph wrecks all hope of reconciliation when he picks and loses a fight with Michael's beautiful girlfriend, Debbie. Later, alone, Ralph receives 'The Visitor' whose services he has hired to provide a painless ending, as he goes into 'That Good Night'. But The Visitor plays a devastating trick, causing Ralph to consider the damaged potential that life still holds for him.

== Critical reception ==
Directed by Edward Hall (his first commercial tour), set designed by Michael Pavalka and lighting by Robert Bryan, critics at the time regarded the play as Crisps' finest work and both the production and performances received enthusiastic reviews:

"This is a brave and profound play, mixing comedy and philosophy. A thought-provoking play that doesn't settle for any soft options and which shows a master storyteller at the pinnacle of his powers. Compassionate in its expression of filial and marital love, it is not a play about euthanasia, but about the nature and meaning of life and in its way a kind of tragic love story. A glorious production, with a set worthy of an HM Tennent play and a cast to match and easily the most moving performance Sinden has given for many years." British Theatre Guide.

== Production ==
The tour of the play coincided with Sinden's other son, actor Jeremy Sinden, becoming ill and dying of cancer on the 29 May 1996. The proposed West End transfer was cancelled.

== Film ==
The film version, which Marc Sinden and Jo Gilbert co-produced, was shot in Portugal starring Sir John Hurt (in his final performance) and Charles Dance and was released in 2017 and is dedicated to Donald Sinden and John Hurt.
