= List of Never the Twain episodes =

Never the Twain is a British television sitcom created by Johnnie Mortimer. The show debuted on 7 September 1981 on ITV. During its ten-year run, 11 series and a Christmas special were produced, with 67 episodes broadcast in total. The lead characters are Simon Peel and Oliver Smallbridge, played by Donald Sinden and Windsor Davies respectively, who are rival antique dealers that have shops next door to each other as well as neighbouring houses.

Peel's son David (Robin Kermode/Christopher Morris) and Smallbridge's daughter Lynn (Julia Watson/Tacy Kneale) enter into a relationship and marry much to the reluctance of their fathers. Peel and Smallbridge engage in a continuous games of one-upmanship but often appear to be friends despite neither prepared to admit it. Recurring characters include Veronica Barton (Honor Blackman), a middle-class widow whom Peel and Smallbridge battle for the affection of; Banks (Teddy Turner), Peel's butler; Ringo (Derek Deadman), Smallbridge's idiotic shop assistant; Mrs. Sadler (Maria Charles), Smallbridge's clumsy cleaner; and Simon's intimidating Aunt Eleanor (Zara Nutley).

== Series overview ==
Series	Episodes	Originally released	
Series	Episodes	First released	Last released
1	6	7 September 1981	19 October 1981
2	6	7 September 1982	12 October 1982
3	6	10 October 1983	14 November 1983
4	6	8 November 1984	13 December 1984
5	6	8 January 1986	12 February 1986
6	6	15 January 1987	19 February 1987
7	6	27 January 1988	2 March 1988
8	6	24 October 1988	28 November 1988
9	6	6 September 1989	11 October 1989
Christmas Special		28 December 1989	
10	6	5 September 1990	10 October 1990
11	6	4 September 1991	9 October 1991

== Episodes ==
=== Series 1 (1981) ===
No. overall	No. in series	Title	Directed by	Written by	Original release date
1	1	"Families at War"	Peter Frazer-Jones	Johnnie Mortimer	7 September 1981
Antique dealers Simon Peel and Oliver Smallbridge were once partners until Oliver had an affair with Simon's wife. Now they are bitter rivals - and next-door neighbours, constantly sabotaging each other. Oliver's daughter, riding instructress Lyn, and Simon's son David, a trainee accountant, are in love and want to marry. The two fathers call a temporary truce to oppose the plan - until Lyn falsely claims that she is pregnant.
2	2	"Of Meissen Men"	Peter Frazer-Jones	Johnnie Mortimer	14 September 1981
Reading that a widow called Veronica Barton is selling her late husband's Meissen collection both Simon and Oliver, pretending to be private collectors, visit, hoping for a knock-down bargain. Discovering that she is an attractive middle-aged woman they compete for her affections as well as the porcelain but when she discovers their true intentions she gets her revenge at a smart restaurant. Lyn and David finally admit that she is not pregnant but try to help their fathers by claiming that the Meissen is to be a wedding present. Veronica consents to selling to both ...
3	3	"A Night at the Opera"	Peter Frazer-Jones	Johnnie Mortimer	21 September 1981
Veronica tells Simon and Oliver that she has a spare ticket for 'Cosi Fan Tutti' in Edinburgh but neither Simon nor Oliver is initially interested - until Oliver poaches Simon's daily help, Mrs Grieves and Simon decides he will escort her out of revenge. Oliver sabotages the plan by telling Simon that Veronica wants to marry him but Simon exposes the plan to Veronica so that Oliver ends up taking Mrs Grieves. Simon finds his replacement for Mrs Grieves in elderly ex-seaman Banks who is happy to pose as the butler.
4	4	"A Matched Pair"	Peter Frazer-Jones	Johnnie Mortimer	28 September 1981
Not only is Oliver's golf club membership refused but his shop is burgled. However the duelling pistols that he reports as stolen were only borrowed by his dim assistant Rocky so, to prevent complications, Rocky dumps them in Simon's shop. Initially amused by Oliver's misfortune Simon is appalled when he gets charged with receiving stolen goods. Oliver comes forward to let him off the hook - provided he will endorse Oliver's golf club membership application.
5	5	"Nothing but the Truth"	Peter Frazer-Jones	Johnnie Mortimer	5 October 1981
Lyn and David vow that they will never lie to each other. Their fathers are sceptical - and gleeful when Lyn breaks off the engagement after David has admitted to a drunken kiss with another girl at a party. Now neither of them will need to pretend to be friends for their children's sake. However the young couple are so miserable that eventually Simon and Oliver combine to reunite them.
6	6	"Father of the Groom"	Peter Frazer-Jones	Johnnie Mortimer	19 October 1981
Simon throws a dinner party for the Smallbridges where inevitably Lyn and David try to keep the peace. After the meal the fathers play cards but Oliver is offended when Simon accuses him of cheating and storms out. Lyn and David get married and, overcome by emotion, Oliver and Simon make up - and decide to play cards again.

=== Series 2 (1982) ===
No. overall	No. in series	Title	Directed by	Written by	Original release date
7	1	"Who's Been Sleeping In My Bed?"	Peter Frazer-Jones	Johnnie Mortimer	7 September 1982
Whilst Lyn and David are on their honeymoon Oliver has a double bed delivered to the rooms they occupy in Simon's house. Simon however has the same idea and two beds now take up a lot of space. When neither of the fathers are prepared to back down the children take their own parent's side and row so to keep the peace Oliver sends back his bed. Unfortunately Simon does too.
8	2	"As Young As You Feel"	Peter Frazer-Jones	Johnnie Mortimer	14 September 1982
When he complains that she is spending too much time looking after her father who is exploiting her goodwill Lyn agrees to accompany David to a rock concert, rather than help Oliver celebrate his birthday. Under the guise of friendship Simon fixes him up with a birthday blind date but it is with the man-eating Isadora Beecham, from whose clutches Simon is trying to escape. Oliver however turns the tables on him.
9	3	"A Woman's Place..."	Peter Frazer-Jones	Johnnie Mortimer	21 September 1982
When Lyn gets a promotion and pay rise at work student David feels inferior and forbids her to take it. They argue and she moves back in with Oliver, who finds her attentions stifling, so he and Simon collude to get the pair back together again. Banks also finds Oliver a housekeeper - his girlfriend, the accident-prone Mrs Sadler.
10	4	"Blood Brothers"	Peter Frazer-Jones	Johnnie Mortimer	28 September 1982
Whilst visiting Oliver Simon has a fall and badly cuts himself, being rushed to hospital. Having the same blood group a very reluctant Oliver agrees to donate blood for a necessary transfusion. Made to feel grateful by David Simon agrees to stop seeing Veronica and lend Oliver his car so that he can date her. However when Simon learns what really happened at the hospital he plans his revenge.
11	5	"If You Knew Susan"	Peter Frazer-Jones	Johnnie Mortimer	5 October 1982
Simon's unpretentious younger sister Susan comes to stay and Simon is perturbed that she likes Oliver and starts going out with him. He offers Oliver a bribe to stop the relationship, unaware that Oliver has learned that Susan only wants to be friends as she has contacted her former boyfriend and has accepted the fact. Oliver uses Simon's ignorance to obtain a coveted figurine at a knock-down price though neither intended that they would end up in a restaurant being romantically serenaded.
12	6	"The More We Are Together"	Peter Frazer-Jones	Johnnie Mortimer	12 October 1982
When David does Oliver's accounts he discovers that Oliver has not been entirely honest about his profits. The tax inspector calls whilst Oliver is out so Oliver reckons that if he and Simon go back into partnership Simon will have to pay half the tax. The deal is signed - after which it is discovered that the tax man accidentally took Simon's books, making Oliver liable for half the payments.

=== Series 3 (1983) ===
No. overall	No. in series	Title	Directed by	Written by	Original release date
13	1	"Taking Stock"	Peter Frazer-Jones	Brian Platt	10 October 1983
Now that they are partners again Oliver and Simon spend a day stock-taking and disparaging each other's items. Oliver is delighted when Bethan, an old school friend, comes into the shop to sell an antique watch. For old times sake Oliver pays her over the odds, later to learn from Simon that she is a con artist - after Oliver has parted with cash half of which now belongs to Simon.
14	2	"Partners"	Peter Frazer-Jones	Brian Platt	17 October 1983
Simon is approached by Mr Wilde, a health food company rep, who wants to buy the shop for its premises and the offer is tempting. Oliver meanwhile wrongly believes that Ringo has won the pools and considers asking him to buy into the partnership to replace Simon. Both men approach the other to tear up the partnership agreement. In the event Ringo has not won the pools and Wilde turns out to be a deluded psychiatric patient so the partnership is back on again - with a pleasant surprise at Ringo's party.
15	3	"A Nose for Quality"	Peter Frazer-Jones	John Kane	24 October 1983
Imperious Lady Devereaux calls in on Simon whilst in the next door shop elderly Mrs Piggit offers Oliver pieces for sale but seeing the Rolls parked outside Oliver wrongly assumes that she is the aristocrat. He is surprised to find that she lives in a council flat but he does pick up some valuable Netsuke whereas Simon's visit to the real Lady Devereaux to outwit his rival proves to be a wasted journey. At least Simon can take comfort from the fact that the Netsukes are fakes.
16	4	"The End of the Line"	Peter Frazer-Jones	Vince Powell	31 October 1983
Simon and Oliver are concerned when Lyn and David claim that they do not want children, David pretending to have had a vasectomy to put them off the scent. Simon and Oliver both sign up to a dating agency and are told to meet their blind dates in a bar but since they have submitted very old photographs of themselves the women fail to recognize them and they get drunk together, rolling home to find that David has not had the snip after all.
17	5	"The Welsh Connection"	Peter Frazer-Jones	Peter Tilbury	7 November 1983
When Lyn and David opine that their over-weight fathers should go on a diet the two men join forces to resist and eat the most unhealthy foods in order to relax and enjoy life. A wake-up call occurs when Oliver learns that a good friend back in Wales has died of a heart attack and he and Simon suddenly espouse healthy living. They even become friends - until Simon learns that Oliver is heading for an auction in Wales to buy the deceased's valuable antiques and gives chase.
18	6	"Not On the Same Wavelength"	Peter Frazer-Jones	Richard Hills	14 November 1983
Both dealers are invited onto local radio to talk about antiques but, since the producer is a member of his golf club, only Simon is asked. With Lyn knitting baby clothes for a friend the fathers assume she is pregnant, and are overjoyed, calling a truce with Simon making sure Oliver gets on the radio show with him. Only on air is it discovered that Lyn is not pregnant, which leads to a fight.

=== Series 4 (1984) ===
No. overall	No. in series	Title	Directed by	Written by	Original release date
19	1	"A Home of Your Own"	Robert Reed	John Kane	8 November 1984
With Lyn and David now in Vancouver where he is working, their flat in Simon's house is empty. His formidable aunt Eleanor rings but, fearing that she wants to move in, he offers it to old school friend Alex - though he throws him out when he realises Alex wants it for an illicit love nest with his secretary. Aunt Eleanor arrives so to forestall her, Simon offers Ringo the flat - only to learn his aunt wanted it for her pretty god-daughter, whom Oliver is more than happy to accommodate.
20	2	"The Royal Connection"	Robert Reed	Vince Powell	15 November 1984
Learning that Prince Charles collects Victoriana, Oliver sends him a gift, hoping to secure his patronage. When Simon finds out he fakes a letter of thanks though Oliver knows it is a fraud. Sadly the parcel he sent the prince is returned as the contents are broken. To get revenge on Simon Oliver takes advantage of the fact that Simon is tracing his family tree and leads him to believe that he is of royal descent. This gives Simon delusions of grandeur though the genealogist shows him that his ancestors were indeed notorious - but for all the wrong reasons.
21	3	"Words and Music"	Robert Reed	John Kane	22 November 1984
Oliver's vet Caroline wants him to sing at her upcoming charity event. Not to be outdone Simon plans to give a dramatic recitation, but when each threatens to withdraw if the other goes on last, she decides to drop them both and go with Ringo, who does impressions. This is enough for them both to come back on side, but on the night Simon loses his voice and Oliver's singing sets the dogs off barking in chorus.
22	4	"No Flame Like An Old Flame"	Robert Reed	Vince Powell	29 November 1984
Simon gets a visit from his first love, Janis Hunter, now a very wealthy widow. The promise of money leads him to propose to her and she accepts but there is a price to pay as she bans him from smoking and drinking and puts him on a vegetarian diet. Simon begins to regret the proposal and calls on Oliver to help get him off the hook.
23	5	"Loves' Neighbours' Lost"	Robert Reed	Richard Hills	6 December 1984
Simon and Oliver both believe they stand a chance with Caroline and, after sabotaging each others' cars in order to take her on her rounds when her own motor is off the road, they decide on a duel. Caroline is horrified but so are her would-be suitors when she introduces them to her fiancé Leslie. Fortunately Mrs Sadler recognizes him as a serial womanizer so the engagement is off but Oliver has the last laugh when Simon's painting of Caroline is revealed.
24	6	"Come Fly with Me!"	Robert Reed	John Kane	13 December 1984
Despite Mrs Sadler's premonition of disaster Oliver and Simon decide to fly to Canada to see their children, with suspiciously cheap plane tickets purchased from junk dealer Biffin's son. Following a recent spate of shop burglaries Simon installs a state of the art alarm system but when he forgets his passport and breaks into the shop it triggers it off, leading to his and Oliver's arrest. They do get a police escort to the airport but on arrival find their destination rather different to the one they expected.

=== Series 5 (1986) ===
No. overall	No. in series	Title	Directed by	Written by	Original release date
25	1	"In Whom We Tryst"	Robert Reed	John Kane	8 January 1986
Simon and Oliver are both smitten by Simon's glamorous new assistant Belinda and both are pleasantly surprised when she reveals to both separately that she will spend a weekend away with them. Both of them turn up at the tryst at an hotel, unaware that it is a ploy to get them away whilst she and her boyfriend are robbing their shops. Fortunately Ringo saves the day - albeit by accident when he locks himself in the shop and calls the police.
26	2	"Going, Going, Gone!"	Robert Reed	Vince Powell	15 January 1986
The two dealers plan - separately - to spend a night at a country pub and are surprised to meet each other there, especially as they have to share a bed in the one guest room. Each is hoping to beat the other in a bid for a grandfather clock at a nearby auction but, after Oliver has been locked out for the night in his pyjamas, their bickering means that neither ends up with the clock.
27	3	"Thicker Than Water"	Robert Reed	Vince Powell	22 January 1986
Whilst drinking in the pub with Oliver, Simon reveals that he is adopted, having been abandoned at an orphanage as a baby. Circumstances lead him to believe that his natural parents may be Charlie Crapper, a drunken petty thief, and his wife Lil, who sells papers on the street. He meets with them to break the bad news but fortunately they know something he does not.
28	4	"Kung Who?"	Robert Reed	Vince Powell	29 January 1986
Simon takes up judo to defend himself against likely muggers and invites Oliver to accompany him to his class at the gym. When Oliver accidentally puts on a tunic with a black belt Simon says nothing but enjoys seeing the so-called expert being pummelled by novices. Next day however Oliver gets revenge when a policeman who is a genuine black belt comes to the shop.
29	5	"Reading Between the Lines"	Robert Reed	John Kane	5 February 1986
Simon is aghast to learn that oily solicitor Brimley, with whom he was at school, is handling the property next to the antique shops and plans to sell it to a fast food chain in return for an expensive car. Brimley will only reconsider if Simon and Oliver pay him a hefty bribe. Fortunately Ringo's tale of unrequited love comes to the rescue when it is discovered that the married Brimley is having an affair with Ringo's dream girl.
30	6	"Definitely Not Cricket"	Robert Reed	John Kane	12 February 1986
Lady Devereaux offers Simon some sporting memorabilia at knock-down prices provided he captains her staff cricket team against the rival side led by parvenu bookie Bernie Miller. Simon is appalled to find his team comprises Lady Devereaux's elderly staff but when rain prevents the game going ahead Simon takes advantage of one staff member's prowess as a darts player and arranges a darts match instead. Miller's side gets thrashed and he has to pay her the money from the bet that his boys would win. Unfortunately for Simon this means that she no longer needs to sell him her paintings after all.

=== Series 6 (1987) ===
No. overall	No. in series	Title	Directed by	Written by	Original release date
31	1	"Feed A Cold"	Robert Reed	Vince Powell	15 January 1987
Simon has a cold and Oliver offers to look after him.
32	2	"Going to Pot"	Robert Reed	John Kane	22 January 1987
Ringo decides to get some culture. After meeting one of his teachers, Simon and Oliver are pleased to accept his invitation to dinner and Simon makes a discovery in the kitchen cupboard.
33	3	"Love Is A Many-Splendoured Thing"	Robert Reed	Vince Powell	29 January 1987
Oliver has fallen in love, however trouble arises after he meets his future mother-in-law.
34	4	"A Night to Remember"	Robert Reed	Vince Powell	5 February 1987
Burglars are in the neighbourhood, leading to an eventful night for the two households.
35	5	"The Battle of Deveraux Dale"	Robert Reed	John Kane	12 February 1987
Lady Deveraux asks Simon and Oliver to take part in a historical re-enactment of a Civil War battle, the battle of Deveraux Dale, at the village fete. On the opposing side is the bookie, Bernie Miller, who has a score to settle.
36	6	"Affairs of the Heart"	Robert Reed	John Kane	19 February 1987
Simon's ex-wife Stephanie arrives unexpectedly.

=== Series 7 (1988) ===
No. overall	No. in series	Title	Directed by	Written by	Original release date
37	1	"Settled Out of Court"	Robert Reed	Vince Powell	27 January 1988
A legal dispute arises between the two antique dealers following an incident in Oliver's shop.
38	2	"The Wagers of Sin"	Robert Reed	John Kane	3 February 1988
Oliver and Simon decide to have a wager on who can make the most profit on an item chosen by the other.
39	3	"Betrothed, Bothered and Bewildered"	Robert Reed	Johnnie Mortimer	10 February 1988
After a boozy night out, Banks remembers that he has proposed to Mrs Sadler. However, neither wants to go through with it, although they don't know that.
40	4	"The Second Time Around"	Robert Reed	John Kane	17 February 1988
Mrs Sadler is missing Banks. Fortunately, there is a happy ending for both of them.
41	5	"Born to Blush Unseen"	Robert Reed	Vince Powell	24 February 1988
Gardening Time. Oliver has something to show from his gardening efforts.
42	6	"Fasten Your Seat Belts!"	Robert Reed	Vince Powell	2 March 1988
Simon & Oliver get severely drunk on Simon's birthday, and decide to visit their children in Canada.

=== Series 8 (1988) ===
No. overall	No. in series	Title	Directed by	Written by	Original release date
43	1	"Grandfathers-in-Law"	Douglas Argent	Johnnie Mortimer	24 October 1988
Lyn and David, with their baby Martin, return from Canada, causing great excitement to Simon and Oliver. However, the grandfathers have to learn to cope with the baby more than they had anticipated.
44	2	"Nursery Times"	Douglas Argent	Johnnie Mortimer	31 October 1988
Lyn and David are looking for a flat while staying at Simon's house. But Oliver would like them to stay with him too.
45	3	"Whose Baby?"	Douglas Argent	Johnnie Mortimer	7 November 1988
The christening is scheduled and Stephanie, Simon's ex, is invited, causing anxiety for both Simon and Oliver.
46	4	"Never Say Die"	Douglas Argent	Vince Powell	14 November 1988
Simon has to go into hospital but confusion arises.
47	5	"Moving On"	Douglas Argent	Johnnie Mortimer	21 November 1988
The house-hunting by Lyn and David reaches a conclusion. It causes Simon and Oliver to think about their own situation.
48	6	"It's A Long Way to Friern Barnet"	Douglas Argent	Johnnie Mortimer	28 November 1988
Lyn and David move to their new flat. Oliver and Simon decide to help them by redecorating the flat.

=== Series 9 (1989) ===
No. overall	No. in series	Title	Directed by	Written by	Original release date
49	1	"Just the Ticket"	Nick Hurran	Vince Powell	6 September 1989
A series of mishaps contribute to a difficult day for Simon and, especially, Oliver.
50	2	"A Point of Honour"	Nick Hurran	Vince Powell	13 September 1989
Simon advertises for an assistant for his shop but runs into trouble after interviewing one applicant.
51	3	"A New Lease of Life"	Nick Hurran	Vince Powell	20 September 1989
Simon is feeling melancholic and decides to make a big change to his life.
52	4	"Aspects of Love"	Nick Hurran	Vince Powell	27 September 1989
Simon arouses Oliver's suspicions and, in turn, Oliver is the subject of a rumour. These lead to gossip in the village.
53	5	"Neighbours"	Nick Hurran	Vince Powell	4 October 1989
Simon holds a meeting of the Residents' Association. There is a new resident who is about to move in and this leads to a sleepless night for both Simon and Oliver.
54	6	"Bonjour, Paris!"	Nick Hurran	Vince Powell	11 October 1989
Off to Paris but soon they are in trouble at the restaurant and with the police, also causing a lot of trouble to an embassy official.
Christmas special
55	–	"A Winter's Tale"	Nick Hurran	Vince Powell	28 December 1989
Christmas time. Simon and Oliver volunteer to keep watch overnight in the local church.

=== Series 10 (1990) ===
No. overall	No. in series	Title	Directed by	Written by	Original release date
56	1	"X Marks the Spot"	Nick Hurran	Vince Powell	5 September 1990
Oliver and Simon both decide to stand for election to the local Council.
57	2	"S.W.A.L.K."	Nick Hurran	Vince Powell	12 September 1990
Simon has a female pen-pal who he is looking forward to meeting, with a view to marriage. However, the reality is different.
58	3	"Who Wants to Be a Millionaire?"	Nick Hurran	Vince Powell	19 September 1990
Both Oliver and Simon are doing the pools and hope to win big. After Oliver makes a mistake, Simon takes the opportunity to have some fun.
59	4	"Happy Holiday"	Nick Hurran	Vince Powell	26 September 1990
A weekend away for Simon and Oliver in Ringo's mother's country cottage. Trouble is that it's the wrong weekend.
60	5	"There But for the Grace of God"	Nick Hurran	Vince Powell	3 October 1990
Simon comes across an old acquaintance who is down on his luck.
61	6	"A Car By Any Other Name"	Nick Hurran	Vince Powell	10 October 1990
The vicar wants to sell his car and gets Simon to help, while Oliver is also selling his car. A confusing time is the result.

=== Series 11 (1991) ===
No. overall	No. in series	Title	Directed by	Written by	Original release date
62	1	"Viva Espana!"	Anthony Parker	Vince Powell	4 September 1991
Ringo wins a holiday in a competition and they all go to Spain.
63	2	"The Best Laid Plans"	Anthony Parker	Vince Powell	11 September 1991
It is the 10th anniversary of the two antique dealers being in business; they decide to go out to have a meal and visit the theatre. But they encounter some difficulties.
64	3	"Born Again"	Anthony Parker	Vince Powell	18 September 1991
Simon is searching for the meaning of life and thinks he has found it after listening to a preacher in the park. Oliver, however, sees a business opportunity.
65	4	"There Goes the Bride!"	Anthony Parker	Vince Powell	25 September 1991
Aunt Eleanor decides to get married after a whirlwind romance.
66	5	"Two Fools and Their Money"	Anthony Parker	Vince Powell	2 October 1991
Both Simon and Oliver are in financial difficulties and decide to approach their bank manager.
67	6	"The First of the Queue"	Anthony Parker	Vince Powell	9 October 1991
Oliver tells Simon about a bargain in a shop, which leads to extraordinary efforts by the two to be first in the queue to buy it. Guest starring Diana Mahoney, real-life wife of Donald Sinden.
