= That Good Night (film) =

- Directed by: Eric Styles
- Screenplay by: Charles Savage
- Based on: That Good Night by N. J. Crisp
- Produced by: Alan Latham; Charles Savage; Victor Glynn (Exec); Geoff Iles (Exec); Marc Sinden (Co-Pro); Jo Gilbert (Co-Pro)
- Starring: John Hurt
- Cinematography: Richard Stoddard
- Edited by: Mali Evans; Chris Timson
- Music by: Guy Farley
- Production company: GSP Studios
- Distributed by: Trafalgar Releasing
- Release date: 22 June 2017 (Edinburgh International Film Festival)
- Running time: 90 minutes
- Country: United Kingdom
- Language: English
- Budget: £3m

That Good Night is a 2017 British drama film directed by Eric Styles and starring John Hurt. It is based on N. J. Crisp's 1996 play of the same name. It is also notable for being Hurt's final film, although Damascus Cover (filmed earlier) was released later.

== Plot ==
Ralph, a famous screenwriter now in his seventies and terminally ill, revisits his moral principles and desires to die with dignity. He wants to reconnect with his estranged son, Michael. He also wants to make sure he does not become a burden to his loving, much younger wife Anna as he goes "into that good night."

== Cast ==
- John Hurt as Ralph
- Charles Dance as The Visitor
- Sofia Helin as Anna
- Max Brown as Michael
- Erin Richards as Cassie
- Noah Jupe as Ronaldo

== Production ==
The film was shot in Algarve, Portugal for five weeks, and produced by London film investment company Goldfinch Studios and co-produced by Marc Sinden and Jo Gilbert, the producers of the original play.

== Reception ==
Rotten Tomatoes gives the film an approval rating of 52% based on 21 critics, and an average rating of 5.20/10.

Neil Young of The Hollywood Reporter gave the film a positive review and wrote that it "passes muster strictly as a showcase for Hurt and Dance." Wendy Ide of Screen Daily also gave the film a positive review and wrote "So effortlessly good is Hurt, however, that he rather outclasses the rest." James Luxford from Picturehouse Spotlight wrote that That Good Night, "is an absorbing British drama that explores issues that with resonate with everyone who sees it. Featuring performances that will inspire conversations long after the credits have rolled, it is a fitting tribute to one of our most instinctive talents."

CineVue's Jamie Neish rated the film 2/5, and wrote "The film never feels truly worthy of Hurt's talents and doesn't utilise his abilities as well as it could have done." The Times also gave it 2/5, and stated "It's more mawkish than melancholic."
