= Sinden Theatre =

Coordinates: 51.07649°N 0.69239°E

The Sinden Theatre is located within the grounds of Homewood School in the heart of the Weald in Tenterden, Kent, England. It was opened in 2004 and is named after its patron, the actor and former local resident, the late Sir Donald Sinden CBE.

The theatre was converted from an existing school hall at the time when Homewood was granted Arts College status in 2003 which enabled funding for conversion to a 231-seat theatrical venue to be carried out.

The theatre is used for the school's own productions, local amateur dramatic groups and also as a commercial theatre hosting visiting performers.

The theatre also allows various charities to hold fund-raising events on a no-fee basis.

The school can provide restaurant facilities in the theatre to serve meals and drinks at some productions.

== Technical Specifications ==
The theatre has a 290-seat maximum, with 210 of them available on retractable tiered seating. It also has a Sennheiser infra-red audio induction loop system available for audience members. There's also multiple control boxes with tie lines for several lighting, video, and projection systems as well as a lectern with a microphone, LED lamp, and laptop connections.

=== Stage ===
The Sinden Theatre's stage is a standard black box configuration with a width of 12.2 meters (40.02 feet), a depth of 8.5 meters (27.88 feet), and a proscenium arch opening of 7.16 meters wide (23.49 feet) by 3.88 meters high (12.72 feet). The thrust extends off the stage another 3 meters (9.84 feet). There is also a 4-meter (13.12 feet) projection screen that can be utilized.

=== Lighting ===
The theatre has a pre-wired grid across the entire ceiling to allow for flexibility in lighting. Their system can handle up to 48 DMX channels, 35 for the pre-wired grid and 1 for the house lights. The theatre also has an Atari Haze machine, smoke machine, Low Fogger, as well as a motorized disco ball.

=== Sound ===
The Sinden Theatre is equipped with six speakers and a Trantec S5.3 Radio Microphone system. They have a variety of sound equipment for renters to use, including a MiniMac with QLAB, CD, minidisc, and cassette play-in sources as well as a PC available for sound and FX usage. There are also a few extra microphones to use and a microphone above the stage that feeds both the induction-loop system and relays audio to the dressing rooms.
