= A Night at the Opera =

A Night at the Opera may refer to:

- A Night at the Opera (film) (1935), a Marx Brothers comedy film
- A Night at the Opera (Queen album) (1975), by rock band Queen
- A Night at the Opera (Blind Guardian album) (2002), by power metal band Blind Guardian
- A Night at the Opera (chess), a famous chess game played during an opera, in which Paul Morphy defeated Duke Karl II of Brunswick and Count Isouard
- "A Night at the Opera" (Never the Twain), a 1981 television episode
- "A Night at the Opera", a TV special stand-up comedy show by comedian Jackie Mason.

Night at the opera may refer to:

- Initial states of the Belgian Revolution of 1830
