= N. J. Crisp =

British TV writer, dramatist and novelist (1923–2005)

- Born: 11 December 1923; Southampton, England
- Died: 14 June 2005 (aged 81); Southampton, England
- Occupations: Novelist, playwright and screenwriter.
- Spouse: Marguerite Lowe
- Children: 3 sons, 1 daughter
- Writing career
- Period: 1959–2005
- Genres: Comedy, drama, adventure, science fiction

Norman James Crisp (11 December 1923 – 14 June 2005), known as a writer only by his initials and surname, N. J. Crisp, was a British television writer, dramatist and novelist.

In the 1960s, after writing single dramas, Crisp moved to writing for serials and turned out scripts for BBC series including Compact, R3, Dixon of Dock Green, Dr. Finlay's Casebook, Colditz and Secret Army.

In 1968, he co-created The Expert, a serial about a forensic scientist, with its producer Gerard Glaister. Four years later the pair repeated these roles with the boardroom drama The Brothers.

His 1996 play That Good Night starred Donald Sinden, Nigel Davenport, Lucy Fleming, Patrick Ryecart and Julie-Kate Olivier and was directed by Edward Hall. The film of the same title, based on Crisp's play, received its world premiere in June 2017 at the Edinburgh International Film Festival. It was John Hurt's final film, and was nominated for the Michael Powell Award for Best British Feature Film.

Crisp's 1987 psychological thriller Dangerous Obsession was filmed in 1999 as Darkness Falls, starring Ray Winstone, Tim Dutton and Sherilyn Fenn. Crisp was displeased with the end result and how his plot had been distorted without his permission that he insisted on having his name removed from the final print.

== Personal life ==
He was married to Marguerite (née Lowe), had three sons and one daughter and five grandchildren.

== Writing credits ==
Production	Notes	Broadcaster
The Dark Man	Television drama (1960)	BBC Television
BBC Sunday-Night Play	"A Kind of Strength" (1961) "The Alderman" (1962) "The Man Who Opted Out" (1962) "The Stepfather" (1962)	BBC Television
ITV Play of the Week	"Two on the Beach" (1961) "The Gentle Assassin" (1962) "Danger Zone" (1963)	ITV
24-Hour Call	"Cry for Help" (1963)	ITV
Taxi!	"The Runaway" (1963) "The Accident" (1963)	BBC Television
Compact	"A Job for the Boy" (1963)	BBC Television
It's a Woman's World	"Jean" (1964)	ITV
Dixon of Dock Green	66 episodes (1964–1972, 1974–1975)	BBC1
The Sullavan Brothers	"The Guilty Go Free" (1965)	ITV
Armchair Mystery Theatre	"The Hunter" (1965)	ITV
The Man in Room 17	"The Seat of Power" (1965)	ITV
R3	"The Astronaut" (1964) "A State of Anxiety" (1964) "Patterns of Behaviour" (1965) "The Fratton Experiment" (1965) "Experiment in Death" (1965)	BBC1
The Flying Swan	"The Cupboard" (1965) "The Contract" (1965)	BBC1
Quick Before They Catch Us	"Power of Three" (1966)	BBC1
Trapped	"Journey Into Nowhere" (1967)	ITV
The Revenue Men	6 episodes (1967–1968)	BBC2
The First Lady	"A Little Goodwill" (1968) "Yes, But Who Am I?" (1968)	BBC1
Dr. Finlay's Casebook	15 episodes (1964–1967, 1969)	BBC1
The Doctors	"Episode #1.7" (1969) "Episode #1.8" (1969)	BBC1
Doomwatch	"Project Sahara" (co-written with Gerry Davis and Kit Pedler, 1970)	BBC1
Codename	"Target" (1970)	BBC2
With Love in Mind	Feature film (1970)	N/A
Owen, M.D.	6 episodes (1971–1972)	BBC1
The Long Chase	13 episodes (1972)	BBC1
The Man Who Was Hunting Himself	Television miniseries (1973)	BBC1
Spy Trap	7 episodes (1972–1973)	BBC1
Orson Welles Great Mysteries	"The Power of Fear" (1973) "Ice Storm" (1974)	ITV
Colditz	"Welcome to Colditz" (1972) "Bribery and Corruption" (1972) "Arrival of a Hero" (1974) "The Gambler" (1974) "Death Sentence" (1974)	BBC1
You're on Your Own	6 episodes (co-written with Gerard Glaister, 1975)	BBC1
Oil Strike North	"The Floating Bomb" (1975) "Shore Leave" (1975) "The Fatal Hours: Part 1" (1975) "The Fatal Hours: Part 2" (1975)	BBC1
Dangerous Knowledge	6 episodes (1976)	ITV
The Expert	62 episodes (1968–1976)	BBC1
The Brothers	92 episodes (1972–1976)	BBC1
The Gotland Deal	First book in the 'Sidney Kenyon' series (1976)	Novel
Jubilee	"Ramsey" (1977)	BBC1
The Odd Job Man	Hardback Edition (1977)	Novel
The Mackinnons	"Man from the Past" (1977) "Working Weekend" (1977) "The Ex-Mrs. Mackinnon" (1977) "A New Life" (1977)	BBC1
Secret Army	9 episodes (1977–1979)	BBC1
The London Deal	Second book in the 'Sidney Kenyon' series (1978)	Novel
Enemy at the Door	"The Librarian" (1978) "The Jerrybag" (1978) "Post Mortem" (1980)"T he Right Blood" (1980)	ITV
A Family Affair	Published the same year as his BBC TV Drama (1979)	Novel
A Family Affair	10 episodes (1979)	BBC1
Jet Set	Theatre Royal, Bath (1979–1980)	Stage Play
Buccaneer	13 episodes (1980)	BBC1
Festival	Hardback edition (1981)	Novel
Squadron	"Independence Day" (1982)	BBC1
The Brink	Hardback edition (1982)	Novel
Yesterday's Gone	Hardback edition (1983)	Novel
The Odd Job Man	Television miniseries (1984)	BBC1
Sherlock Holmes and the Masks of Death	Television film (co-written with Anthony Hinds, 1984)	Channel 4
Fighting Chance	Apollo (Shaftesbury Avenue), London (1985–1985)	Stage Play
Murder Elite	Feature film (1985)	N/A
Strike It Rich!	"Suspicions" (1986) "Extraordinary General Meeting" (1986)	BBC1
In the Long Run	The first book in the 'Stephen Haden' series (1987)	Novel
The Ninth Circle	The second book in the 'Stephen Haden' series (1988)	Novel
Dangerous Obsession	Theatre Royal, Bath (1989–1990)	Stage play
Sunday Pursuit	Short film (1990)	HTV
Coup de Foudre	"Retour" (co-written with Jean Curtelin, 1991)	Canal+ France 2
Suspicions	Full Length play, Drama (1992)	Stage play
That Good Night	Yvonne Arnaud Theatre, Guildford (1996)	Stage play
That Good Night	World premiere in June 2017 Released in UK cinemas on 11 May 2018	Film
