= Jo Gilbert =

English film producer and casting director

- Born: Joanne Lesley Gilbert; 7 June 1955; Leicester, England
- Died: 15 September 2018 (aged 63); Newtownards, County Down, Northern Ireland
- Occupations: Film producer, casting director
- Years active: 1993–2018
- Spouse: Marc Sinden (m. 1977; div. 1997)
- Children: 2
- Relatives: Donald Sinden (father-in-law)

Joanne Lesley Gilbert (7 June 1955 – 15 September 2018) was an English film producer and casting director. She founded Real Hollywood Productions and is credited with helping to establish Northern Ireland as an international filming location.

== Career ==
=== Casting director ===
Gilbert began her career as a theatrical agent, working on productions such as The Mystery of Edwin Drood (1993).

As a casting director working on the The Brylcreem Boys (1997) for the director Terence Ryan, it was the first film shot on Isle of Man since the 1936 film No Limit. She was then involved with Darkness Falls (1999), which was also filmed on the island.

Gilbert moved to Northern Ireland in 1999, having been described as "instrumental" in the development of the screen industry on the Isle of Man.

=== Film producer ===
In 2002, she produced the film adaptation of Spike Milligan's novel Puckoon. For this production, she converted Paint Hall, a disused facility at the Harland & Wolff shipyard, into a film studio. It later became the main studio for the HBO series Game of Thrones.

Gilbert appeared in a 2003 episode of the UK serialised fly on the wall documentary Airline, having missed an EasyJet flight to Belfast in which she attempted to use her vocation as a method of intimidating and bullying airport staff.

Her subsequent work included producing the 2007 romantic drama Closing the Ring, which was filmed in Belfast with assistance from Invest Northern Ireland. The Belfast Telegraph reported that Gilbert had successfully persuaded director Richard Attenborough to give Martin McCann a part in the film.

In December 2007, Gilbert established Real Holywood Productions in Holywood, County Down, with a 20 million pound investment from property entrepreneur Robert Whitton.

Gilbert produced the 40-part documentary series Great West End Theatres for Great Productions, which aired in 2013 to critical acclaim.

In 2015, Real Hollywood Productions said it wanted to buy Shackleton Barracks, which it had rented for housing cast and crew. Gilbert said: “There’s lots of interests from the [United States], this is a place with so much potential, we will have five productions running concurrently on this site."

In 2016, Gilbert produced Property of the State, a drama based on a true story. At the time of her death, she was in pre-production for a film titled The Ribbon.

== Personal life and death ==
Gilbert was married to the actor and producer Marc Sinden from 1977 until their divorce in 1997. Through this marriage, she became the daughter-in-law of the actor Sir Donald Sinden. The couple had two children, Hal Sinden and Bridey Sinden.

Gilbert died on 15 September 2018 in Newtownards, County Down, at the age of 63, following a battle with a brain tumour.

Her contributions were noted by Northern Ireland Screen, who wrote that she "flew a staggeringly energetic flag for the potential of the film industry for Northern Ireland long before anyone else would take it seriously".

== Selected filmography ==
- The Mystery of Edwin Drood (1993) – Casting Director
- Puckoon (2002) – Producer
- Closing the Ring (2007) – Producer
- Great West End Theatres (2012) – Producer (Series)
- Property of the State (2016) – Producer
