= Gielgud Award =

American stage acting award

The Gielgud Award for Excellence in the Dramatic Arts, initially referred to as the Golden Quill, is a prize established in 1994 which is presented by the America-based Shakespeare Guild, founded by John F. Andrews, OBE. The award is named in honor of the English actor Sir John Gielgud.

== Background ==
The Gielgud Award was created in April 1994 at a ceremony at the Folger Shakespeare Library on Capitol Hill in Washington, D.C. The ceremony contained speeches by Robert MacNeil, Tony Randall, and Susan Stamberg, who read a letter that Sir John had written for the occasion. It was announced that the award would, according to the Shakespeare Guild website, "preserve the heritage of Sir John Gielgud and pay tribute to the actors, directors, producers, and writers who are doing the most to perpetuate his legacy and that of the poet whose work he did so much to convey to succeeding generations of Shakespeare enthusiasts." The award was first presented in 1996 and has been given sporadically ever since.

== Recipients ==
Year	Recipient	Location
1996	Sir Ian McKellen	Folger Shakespeare Library
1997	Sir Derek Jacobi	Folger Shakespeare Library
1998	Zoe Caldwell	Folger Shakespeare Library
1999	Dame Judi Dench	Ethel Barrymore Theatre
2000	Sir Kenneth Branagh	Middle Temple, London
2001	No Award	
2002	Kevin Kline	Lincoln Center
2003	Lynn Redgrave	National Arts Club
2004	No Award	
2005	No Award	
2006	Christopher Plummer	National Arts Club
2007	Michael Kahn	British Embassy, Washington, D.C.
2008	Sir Patrick Stewart	National Arts Club
2009	No Award	
2010	F. Murray Abraham	National Arts Club
2011	No Award	
2012	No Award	
2013	No Award	
2014	Sir Donald Sinden (posthumously) received by Marc Sinden	Guildhall, London
2015	Dame Eileen Atkins	Guildhall, London
2016	Vanessa Redgrave	Guildhall, London
2017	Sir David Hare	Guildhall, London
2018	Sir Richard Eyre	Guildhall, London
2019	Sir Cameron Mackintosh	Gielgud Theater
