= Edward Hall (director) =

English theatre director

- Born: 27 November 1966 (age 59)
- Occupations: Theatre and film director
- Spouse: Issy van Randwyck
- Children: 2
- Father: Peter Hall
- Relatives: Rebecca Hall (half-sister); Christopher Hall (half-brother); Jennifer Caron Hall (half-sister)

Edward Hall (born 27 November 1966) is an English theatre and film director who founded the all-male Propeller Shakespeare company of which he is artistic director, in 1997. He is the Artistic Director of Chicago Shakespeare Theater. He is known for directing Shakespeare productions, musicals such as Sunny Afternoon and multiple screen productions, including William Boyd's TV adaptation of Restless.

== Career ==
Hall began his professional career as a theatre director at the Watermill Theatre in the early 1990s. At the Watermill, Hall directed a number of Shakespeare plays, including Henry V and The Comedy of Errors. In 1996 he directed Donald Sinden, Patrick Ryecart and Nigel Davenport in a UK tour of N. J. Crisp's drama That Good Night.

In 2002, Hall directed Rose Rage, an adaptation of all three of Shakespeare's Henry VI plays, at the Haymarket Theatre. It was described by The Guardian as "an exhilaratingly surreal and bloody take on Shakespeare."

Although he has for the most part worked in the theatre, Hall has directed some radio and television programmes including Into Exile for BBC Radio 4 and episodes of Trial and Retribution and Marple for television. He directed the 2012 two-part TV miniseries Restless.

Hall took over as Artistic Director and Joint Chief Executive of the Hampstead Theatre in February 2010 stepping down in Spring 2019.

Since October 2023, Hall has served as Artistic Director and Carl and Marilynn Thoma Chair for Chicago Shakespeare Theater.

== Personal life ==
Hall is the son of the theatre director Peter Hall and his second wife, Jacqueline Taylor. He has several siblings and half siblings and is half-brother of actresses Rebecca Hall and Jennifer Caron Hall and producer Christopher Hall. Hall studied at Leeds University and Mountview Theatre School. He is married to Issy van Randwyck, a Dutch comedian and actress, with whom he has two daughters.

== Selected theatre work ==
=== Director ===
- Victoria Station (Theatr Mwldan, Wales)
- Who's Afraid of Virginia Woolf? (Theatre Royal Windsor and tour)
- An Ideal Husband (Theatre Royal Windsor and tour)
- Decadence (Bratislava and Oslo Nye Theatre)
- Chambers of Glass (Minerva Studio, Chichester)
- Cain (Minerva Studio, Chichester)
- Lysistrata (West End, Richmond Theatre and Epidavros)
- Bare-Knuckle Selling (Edinburgh Festival)
- No Remission (Edinburgh Festival – Mobil Prizewinner)
- The Hanuman (RNT Studio)
- Richard III (Tokyo, Globe)
- Othello (Watermill, Newbury, and world tour)
- Henry V (Watermill, Newbury, and world tour)
- The Comedy of Errors (Watermill, Newbury, and world tour)
- The Taming of the Shrew (Old Vic and world tour)
- Twelfth Night (Old Vic and world tour)
- That Good Night (Marc Sinden Productions tour)
- Celaine (Hampstead)
- Sacred Heart (Royal Court Upstairs)
- Tantalus (Co-director: Denver Theatre Company and UK tour)
- The Two Gentlemen of Verona (RSC)
- Henry V (RSC)
- Chariots of Fire (Hampstead Theatre)
- Sunny Afternoon (Hampstead Theatre)

=== Assistant director ===
- King Lear in New York (Chichester Festival Theatre)
- Venus Observed (Chichester Festival Theatre)
- The Sisterhood (Chichester Festival Theatre)
- Arsenic and Old Lace (Chichester Festival Theatre)
- She Stoops to Conquer (Chichester Festival Theatre)
- Preserving Mr Panmure (Chichester Festival Theatre)
- I Thought I Heard a Rustling (Theatre Royal Stratford East)
- The Comedy of Errors (RSC world tour)
- The Winter's Tale (RSC world tour)
- Lysistrata (RSC)

== Filmography ==
- Restless two-part TV miniseries
- Kingdom (TV series)
- Trial & Retribution XI: Closure (TV movie)
- Marple: Sleeping Murder (TV movie)
- Safari Strife (Cutting Edge)
- Richard III (NHK Japan)
- Blithe Spirit (Theatrical film)
