= Great Productions =

British film production company

Great Productions is a Pinewood Studios-based film production company, specialising in feature films and documentaries.

== Productions ==
Their current project is filming the 40-part documentary series Great West End Theatres.

In their review of the series, the British Theatre Guide said "This film is as close as one can get to standing on the stage taking an ovation. This series is beautifully filmed and gets the balance exactly right between classy camera work, history, reminiscence and gossip."

The Daily Telegraph, in its review, stated the "lovely documentary series is made by the director Marc Sinden. Its star, and – it transpires – the best documentary frontman of all time, is his actor-father: Sir Donald Sinden, 90 years old next month. Sir Donald has been let loose, offering anecdotes and memories apparently as they occur to him and the effect is enchanting beyond belief. It is also, at times, incredibly funny. One has the sense of a lifetime spent in this world, being poured out for our delight like glasses of vintage champagne. Great West End Theatres is financed privately, in order that artistic control can be maintained and this shows in every loving, angle-free moment. More money is now in the process of being raised from investors. It seems to me rather important that the series should be completed: this is popular history at its best."

The first 10 episodes were broadcast from 3 August 2013 in the UK by the BSkyB digital satellite channel Sky Arts 2.

The company has three feature films and several further documentaries slated for production.
