= Seven Deadly Sins Four Deadly Sinners =

Anthology-style play by Norman Hudis and Marc Sinden

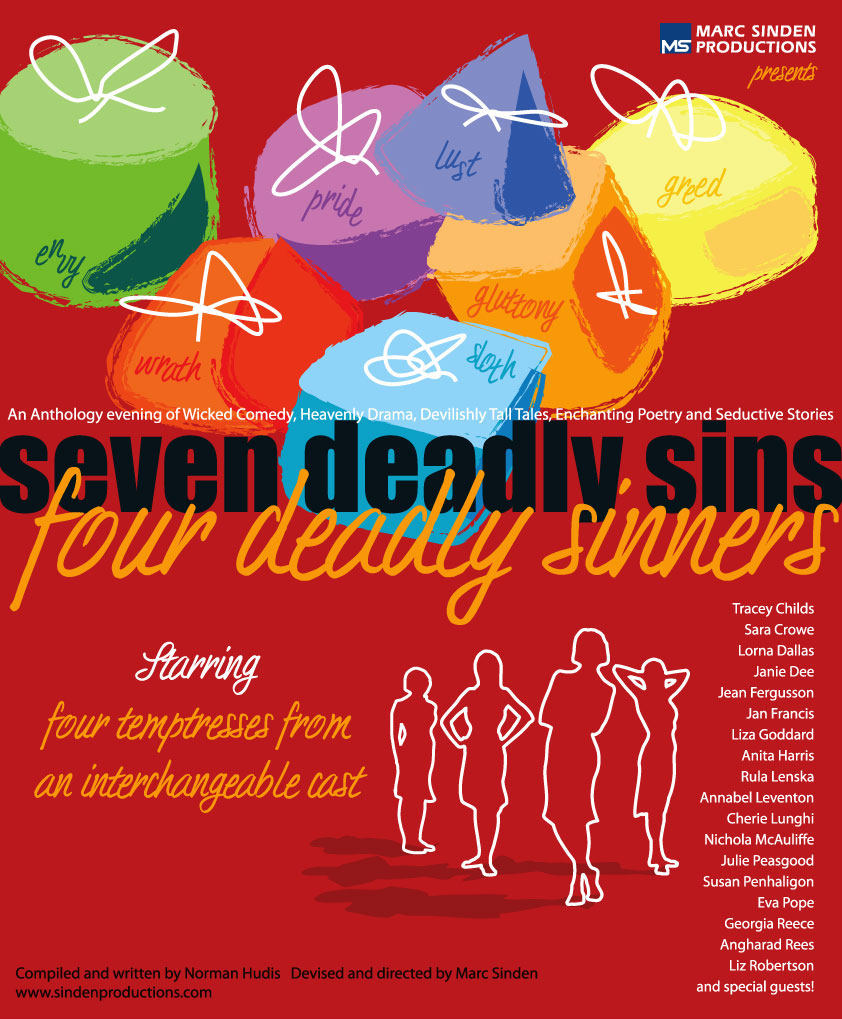
- 2007 production poster (designed by Simon Gunn)
- Original language: English
- Written by: Norman Hudis; Marc Sinden
- Characters: Four well-known actresses
- Subject: The 'Seven Deadly Sins' from a female perspective
- Genre: Anthology / Comedy

Premiere
- Date: 15 June 2003
- Place: Princess Theatre, Hunstanton, Norfolk
- Official website

Seven Deadly Sins Four Deadly Sinners is an anthology-style play compiled and written by Carry On... writer Norman Hudis and producer Marc Sinden, who is also the director. It was originally devised by Sinden as a female rival to the RSC's The Hollow Crown and was the first anthology to have a permanent 'pool' of actresses from which four appear for the performance.

It has toured in the UK since 15 June 2003 (premiering at the Princess Theatre, Hunstanton, Norfolk) and is produced all over Europe and throughout the rest of the world by Marc Sinden Productions. Internationally, it has been performed at the British Theatre Season, Monaco; the Holder's Festival, Barbados; on Guernsey (one of the Channel Islands) and is currently on an 18-month tour of Australia and New Zealand.

It is billed as: "An anthology evening of Wicked Comedy, Heavenly Drama, Devilishly Tall Tales, Enchanting Poetry and Seductive Stories starring Four Deadly Beautiful Temptresses, who will enlighten you on how to survive, or even live by, the Seven Deadly Sins!"

== Cast ==
Compiled from the works of nearly everyone with a sense of humour (sometimes unintentional) - from Chaucer to Victoria Wood, from Woody Allen to Oscar Wilde via Flanders & Swann, Joyce Grenfell, Steven Berkoff and Noël Coward, it stars four from the following alphabetically listed, interchangeable cast:

- Lysette Anthony
- Debbie Arnold
- Jane Asher
- Samantha Beckinsale
- Tara Blaise
- Judy Buxton
- Tracey Childs
- Sara Crowe
- Lorna Dallas
- Janie Dee
- Serena Evans
- Jan Francis
- Liza Goddard
- Anita Harris
- Sue Holderness
- Belinda Lang
- Caroline Langrishe
- Rula Lenska
- Annabel Leventon
- Cherie Lunghi
- Nichola McAuliffe
- Kerry Norton
- Eva Pope
- Linda Purl
- Georgia Reece
- Liz Robertson
- Twiggy
- Joanne Whalley
