= Gemma Craven =

Irish actress (born 1950)

- Born: Rita Gemma Gabriel; 1 June 1950 (age 76); Dublin, County Dublin, Ireland
- Occupations: Actress, singer, musician
- Years active: 1972–2012
- Spouses: Frazer Hines (m. 1981; div. 1984); David Beamish (m. 1990; div. 1996)
- Awards: Society of West End Theatre Award for Best Actress in a Musical; 1980 They're Playing Our Song

Gemma Craven (born 1 June 1950) is an Irish actress, now retired. She is best known for her roles as Cinderella in the film The Slipper and the Rose (1976) and as Joan Parker, the frigid wife of Arthur (Bob Hoskins), in the BBC TV drama Pennies From Heaven (1978).

== Biography ==
Craven's family moved from Dublin to Britain in 1960, and she attended St Bernard's High School, Westcliff-on-Sea in Essex.

She appeared as Cinderella in the film The Slipper and the Rose (1976) opposite Richard Chamberlain. She was cast as an unknown, having been spotted by one of the producers while performing at the Bristol Old Vic in a production of The Threepenny Opera.

In London's West End, she starred opposite Tom Conti in the musical They're Playing Our Song for which she won a Laurence Olivier Award (at the time known as the Society of West End Theatre Awards SWET) for her performance, the lead role in South Pacific, and in Noël Coward's Private Lives opposite Marc Sinden, Tony Anholt and Anholt's wife Tracey Childs which toured throughout 1991 and into 1992. She also played Josie in Boy George's Taboo and features on the OCR singing "Independent Woman".

Craven featured as Emily in the adaptation of the eponymous novel by Jilly Cooper. Directed by Alastair Reid, it was broadcast on 6 April 1977 and featured Ronald Pickup. She appeared as Joan Parker, the frigid wife of Arthur (Bob Hoskins), in the original television version of Dennis Potter's Pennies From Heaven (1978); she has talked about the difficulty the role presented in undertaking a nude scene, which was seen as counter to her public image. She also made guest appearances on Robin of Sherwood (1985), The Bill, The Morecambe and Wise Show, The Two Ronnies, Father Ted (episode "And God Created Woman") and in the British drama Midsomer Murders episode, "Shot at Dawn" as Judy Hicks, the wife of Dave Hicks (Brian Capron). She co-starred in the 1982 British TV version of East Lynne. She also appeared on BBC TV's long-running old time music hall show The Good Old Days.

Her most substantial film role was as Minna Planer opposite Richard Burton's Richard Wagner, in the 1983 film Wagner. She also appeared in Why Not Stay for Breakfast? (1979), Double X: The Name of the Game (1992), The Mystery of Edwin Drood (1993), Words Upon the Window Pane (1994) and The Hole (2001).

On radio, she played the part of Helen in the BBC Radio 4 comedy Clare in the Community.

She appeared on Irish television in the medical drama series The Clinic which ran weekly on RTÉ One.

In November/December 2008, Craven appeared in Hollyoaks Later as Erin "Ma" Fisher – Mother to Malachy, Kris and Bernadette.

== Personal life ==
Craven was married from 1981 to 1984 to actor Frazer Hines, and from 1990 to 1996 to financier David Beamish.
