= Great West End Theatres =

2012 film by Marc Sinden

- Directed by: Marc Sinden
- Presented by: Sir Donald Sinden
- Narrated by: Marc Sinden
- Opening theme: Things Ain't What They Used To Be performed by Ben Webster
- Country of origin: United Kingdom
- No. of episodes: 10

Production
- Producer: Jo Gilbert
- Camera setup: Sony HD
- Running time: 45–95 minutes per episode
- Production companies: Marc Sinden Productions; Real Holywood Productions

Original release
- Network: Sky Arts
- Release: 3 August 2013 – 2013

Great West End Theatres is a documentary series planned and intended to detail the history, architecture, and theatrical anecdotes of all forty West End Theatres of London (as covered by the monthly Society of London Theatre list). The ten episodes completed before the death of the series' host are available individually as All-Region DVDs and also as digital downloads and were broadcast in 2013 in the UK on Sky Arts 2 and were chosen as "Pick of the Day" by the London edition of Time Out magazine.

== Production ==
Presented by Sir Donald Sinden and described by The Stage newspaper as "Promises to be the most definitive guide to Theatreland", it features many of the West End's star actors, actresses and practitioners discussing the theatres that they are associated with, such as Anthony Andrews, Steven Berkoff, Simon Callow, Charles Dance, Roy Hudd, Griff Rhys Jones, Gillian Lynne, Sir Cameron Mackintosh, Sir Ian McKellen, Martin Shaw, and Samuel West.

Directed and narrated by Marc Sinden, written and researched by Shaun McKenna, it is produced by Jo Gilbert for Great Productions.

== Episodes ==
The ten episodes are (and feature interviews with):

1. Theatre Royal, Haymarket: (Sir Ian McKellen, Steven Berkoff & Martin Shaw).
2. Prince of Wales: (Sir Cameron Mackintosh, Simon Callow, Roy Hudd & Griff Rhys Jones).
3. Piccadilly: (Steven Berkoff, Simon Callow, Gillian Lynne, Martin Shaw & Samuel West).
4. Wyndham's: (Sir Cameron Mackintosh, Anthony Andrews, Steven Berkoff, Charles Dance, Gillian Lynne, Martin Shaw & Samuel West).
5. St Martins: (Sir Cameron Mackintosh, Sir Ian McKellen, Stephen Waley-Cohen, Anthony Andrews, Steven Berkoff, Charles Dance & Martin Shaw).
6. Ambassadors: (Sir Ian McKellen, Sir Stephen Waley-Cohen, Anthony Andrews, Steven Berkoff, Simon Callow, Charles Dance, Martin Shaw & Samuel West).
7. Her Majesty's: (Anthony Andrews, Michael Ball, Steven Berkoff, Simon Callow, Griff Rhys Jones, Gillian Lynne, Martin Shaw & Samuel West).
8. Palace: (Sir Cameron Mackintosh, Anthony Andrews, Michael Ball, Steven Berkoff & Simon Callow).
9. Noël Coward: (Sir Cameron Mackintosh, Sir Ian McKellen, Anthony Andrews, Steven Berkoff, Simon Callow, Griff Rhys Jones, Martin Shaw & Samuel West).
10. Theatre Royal, Drury Lane: (Sir Cameron Mackintosh, Sir Ian McKellen, Anthony Andrews, Michael Ball, Steven Berkoff, Simon Callow, Roy Hudd, Griff Rhys Jones, Gillian Lynne & Martin Shaw).

== Full List of West End Theatres ==
Adelphi • Aldwych • Ambassadors • Apollo • Apollo Victoria • Cambridge • Coliseum • Criterion • Dominion • Duchess • Duke of York’s • Fortune • Garrick • Gielgud • Harold Pinter • Her Majesty’s • London Palladium • Lyceum • Lyric • Noël Coward • Novello • Old Vic • Palace • Piccadilly • Phoenix • Playhouse • Prince Edward • Prince of Wales • Queen’s • Royal Court • Royal Opera House • Savoy • Shaftesbury • St Martins • Theatre Royal, Drury Lane • Theatre Royal, Haymarket • Trafalgar Studios • Vaudeville • Victoria Palace • Wyndham’s

== Reception ==
In their review of the series, the British Theatre Guide said "This film is as close as one can get to standing on the stage taking an ovation. This series is beautifully filmed and gets the balance exactly right between classy camera work, history, reminiscence and gossip."

The Daily Telegraph, in its review at the time of release, stated that the "lovely documentary series is made by the director Marc Sinden. Its star, and – it transpires – the best documentary frontman of all time, is his actor-father: Sir Donald Sinden, 90 years old next month. Sir Donald has been let loose, offering anecdotes and memories apparently as they occur to him and the effect is enchanting beyond belief. It is also, at times, incredibly funny. One has the sense of a lifetime spent in this world, being poured out for our delight like glasses of vintage champagne. Great West End Theatres is financed privately, in order that artistic control can be maintained and this shows in every loving, angle-free moment. More money is now in the process of being raised from investors. It seems to me rather important that the series should be completed: this is popular history at its best."
