= Never the Twain =

British TV sitcom (1981–1991)

- Genre: Sitcom
- Created by: Johnnie Mortimer
- Written by: Johnnie Mortimer; Vince Powell
- Directed by: Peter Frazer-Jones (series 1–3); Robert Reed (series 4–7); Douglas Argent (series 8); Nick Hurran (series 9–10); Anthony Parker (series 11)
- Starring: Donald Sinden; Windsor Davies; Maria Charles; Teddy Turner; Derek Deadman
- Theme music composer: Jack Trombey
- Country of origin: United Kingdom
- Original language: English
- No. of series: 11
- No. of episodes: 67 (list of episodes)

Production
- Producers: Peter Frazer-Jones (1981–1988); Anthony Parker (1988–1991)
- Production location: Hersham, Surrey
- Running time: 30 minutes (including commercials)
- Production company: Thames Television

Original release
- Network: ITV
- Release: 7 September 1981 – 9 October 1991

Never the Twain is a British sitcom that ran for eleven series from 7 September 1981 to 9 October 1991. The series starred Windsor Davies (previously known for It Ain't Half Hot Mum) and Donald Sinden as rival antique dealers, and also co-starred Robin Kermode (later replaced by Christopher Morris), Julia Watson (later replaced by Tacy Kneale), Honor Blackman, Teddy Turner, Derek Deadman, Maria Charles and Zara Nutley.

The series was created by Johnnie Mortimer, and was the only sitcom he created without his usual writing partner, Brian Cooke. Mortimer wrote all of the first two series, one episode of the seventh, and five out of six episodes of the eighth, with the rest mainly written by John Kane and Vince Powell (who wrote the whole of the last three series). It was made by Thames Television for the ITV network. Since its run ended, it has been repeated a few times, including on UK Gold, Forces TV, and as of July 2023 on ITV3 in their pre-9.00am comedy slot. The title is taken from the Rudyard Kipling poem The Ballad of East and West. The show's theme tune was composed by Jack Trombey, and the track was entitled Domino.

== Plot ==
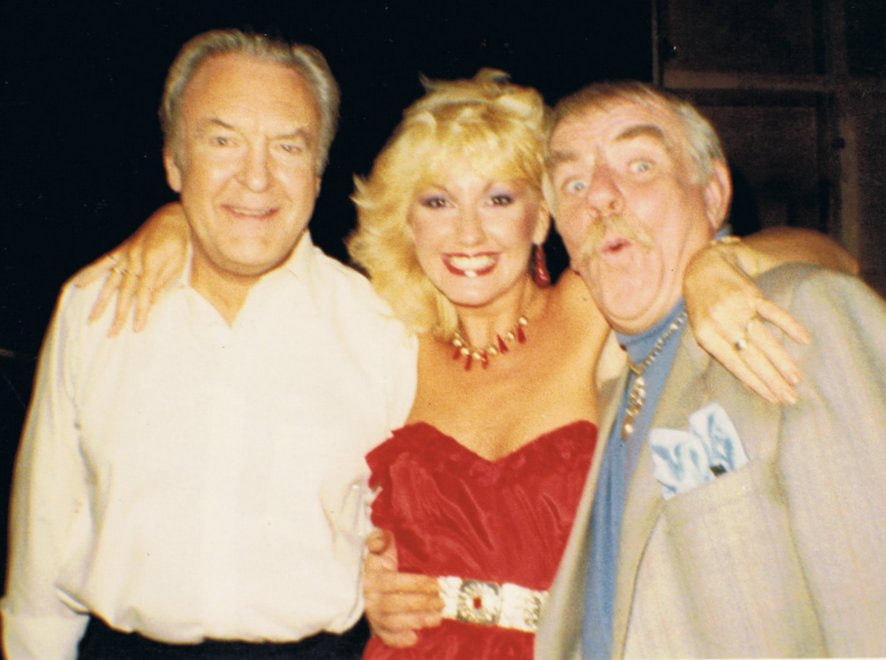
Donald Sinden and Windsor Davies during production of Never the Twain

Oliver Smallbridge, played by Windsor Davies, and Simon Peel, played by Donald Sinden, are antiques dealers who are also bitter enemies (after a falling-out having been business partners) and next-door neighbours, both in their homes and shops. They are engaged in a continuous game of one-upmanship, so both of them are shocked when they find out that their respective children (Smallbridge's daughter Lyn – played by Watson and later Kneale – and Peel's son David – played by Kermode and later Morris) are in love and want to marry as soon as possible. The fathers are forced to reluctantly accept the relationship and marriage, which takes place at the end of the first series.

It is the impending marriage of Lyn and David and the early days of their marriage, alongside Oliver and Simon battling over the affection of middle-class widow Veronica Barton (played by Blackman), that provides the basis for the first two series (both written entirely by Mortimer). The third series features a failed attempt by Simon and Oliver to try to renew their business partnership.

After the third series, Lyn and David move to Vancouver in Canada, leaving the daily goings-on at Simon and Oliver's shops and in their private lives as the main themes of the show. Other notable characters in the series are Simon's butler Banks (played by Turner), a replacement for a foreign au pair that Simon had requested; Ringo (played by Deadman), Oliver's idiotic assistant in his shop; and Mrs. Sadler (played by Charles), Oliver's clumsy cleaner, who has an annoying tendency to accidentally break things. Banks and Mrs. Sadler's amorous relationship provides humorous material in these series, with both of them marrying and leaving the show at the end of the seventh series. The fourth to seventh series were written by a group of writers, Powell and Me and My Girl co-creator Kane being the most prominent.

In the eighth series (mostly written again by Mortimer), Lyn and David return from Canada with their son (and Oliver's and Simon's grandson) Martin, who provides a new platform on which Simon and Oliver can develop their long-standing rivalry, fighting over who is the better grandfather. However, at the end of that series, Lyn, David, and Martin move to a new flat in Friern Barnet.

Simon and Oliver's daily personal and business lives are the primary focus of the final three series (all written in their entirety by Powell). In these series, another character (who had already made two appearances in series 4 and 7) begins to appear regularly: Simon's Aunt Eleanor (played by Nutley, who had also appeared in Vince Powell's earlier sitcom Mind Your Language), moves near Oliver and Simon.

Also, appearing in some episodes of the series were Donald Sinden's sons Marc and Jeremy, while his wife Diana appeared in the last-ever episode.

== Cast ==
=== Main cast ===
- Windsor Davies as Oliver Smallbridge
- Donald Sinden as Simon Peel
- Derek Deadman as Ringo (all series; 40 episodes)
- Honor Blackman as Veronica Barton (series 1 and 2; 5 episodes)
- Julia Watson (series 1 to 3; 18 episodes) and Tacy Kneale (series 8; 6 episodes) as Lyn Peel, née Smallbridge
- Robin Kermode (series 1 to 3; 18 episodes) and Christopher Morris (series 8; 6 episodes) as David Peel
- Teddy Turner as Banks (series 1 to 7; 36 episodes)
- Maria Charles as Mrs Sadler (series 2 to 7; 28 episodes)
- Zara Nutley as Aunt Eleanor (series 4, series 7, series 9 to 11; 19 episodes)

=== Recurring cast ===
- Cass Allen as Mrs Grieves (series 1 and 2; 2 episodes)
- Ted Valentine as Biffin (series 3 and 4; 3 episodes)
- Charles Morgan as Claggit (series 3, series 5; 2 episodes)
- Sydney Arnold as Derwent (series 3, series 5; 2 episodes)
- Donald Eccles as Wilkins (series 3, series 5; 2 episodes)
- Margaret Courtenay as Lady Deveraux (series 3, series 5 and 6; 3 episodes)
- Gabrielle Drake as Caroline Montague (series 4; 2 episodes)
- John Barrard as Arkroyd (series 5 and 6; 2 episodes)
- Christopher Ellison as Bernie Miller (series 5 and 6; 2 episodes)
- Gordon Peters as Doctor Brown (series 8 and 9; 4 episodes)
- Jasper Jacob as the Vicar (series 9 to 11; 3 episodes)

== Episodes ==
| Series | Episodes | Originally released | |
| Series | Episodes | First released | Last released |
|---|---|---|---|
| 1 | 6 | 7 September 1981 | 19 October 1981 |
| 2 | 6 | 7 September 1982 | 12 October 1982 |
| 3 | 6 | 10 October 1983 | 14 November 1983 |
| 4 | 6 | 8 November 1984 | 13 December 1984 |
| 5 | 6 | 8 January 1986 | 12 February 1986 |
| 6 | 6 | 15 January 1987 | 19 February 1987 |
| 7 | 6 | 27 January 1988 | 2 March 1988 |
| 8 | 6 | 24 October 1988 | 28 November 1988 |
| 9 | 6 | 6 September 1989 | 11 October 1989 |
| Christmas Special | | 28 December 1989 | |
| 10 | 6 | 5 September 1990 | 10 October 1990 |
| 11 | 6 | 4 September 1991 | 9 October 1991 |

== Home releases ==
The complete first series was released on DVD in June 2001 by Clear Vision, and no other series were released. It was announced that a different company would release a DVD featuring the first two series, which was eventually released in September 2010.

An 11-disc complete series set, through Network, was released on 21 October 2019.

In Australia (Region 4), Via Vision Entertainment released The Complete Series in an 11-disc box set on 6 January 2021.

== Locations ==
The outside filming location for the two antique shops in the early series was a double-fronted restaurant on The Green in the village of Claygate in Surrey, just six miles to the south of Thames Television’s Teddington Studios. They then used some shops at 10-12 Queen's Road, Hersham, Surrey. The churches used for the weddings were St Andrew's Church, Ham, Surrey and St Andrew's Church, Cobham, Surrey. The houses used in the early series were on Burtenshaw Road, Thames Ditton, Surrey. One of these has since been demolished and another house built on the plot. Later houses on Brook Farm Road and Oak Road, Cobham were used.

== Repeats ==
Beginning in early 2006, ITV3 began showing repeats beginning with series one in a late afternoon timeslot with other classic ITV comedy series such as Rising Damp and On the Buses. From late January 2019, coincidentally a short time after the announcement of Windsor Davies's death, Forces TV started broadcasting the show as double bills from the very start. As of July 2023, the show has started being repeated again on ITV3 in their pre-9.00am comedy slot.

== Interviews ==
- The Bill Podcast: Jon Iles (2017)
