= Dangerous Obsession =

- Original language: English
- Written by: N. J. Crisp
- Characters: 3.
- Genre: Psychological Thriller
- Setting: A smart house in the English Home Counties

Premiere
- Date: 9 November 1987
- Place: Churchill Theatre, Bromley

Dangerous Obsession is a psychological thriller written by N. J. Crisp which premièred at the Churchill Theatre, Bromley, England, on 9 November 1987.

A film, very loosely based on Crisp's play, was released in 1999 as Darkness Falls, directed by Gerry Lively. The film starred Ray Winstone, Tim Dutton and Sherilyn Fenn. Playwright N. J. Crisp objected to the production and has his name removed from the film credits. He died in 2005.

== Other productions ==
The play Dangerous Obsession has been popular on regional stages in the United Kingdom and the United States. Notable productions have included:

- Bickford Theatre, New Jersey, 2010
- Bromley Little Theatre, London, 2012
- Belgrade Theatre, Coventry, 2019
