= Zara Nutley =

English actress (1924–2016)

- Born: Zahrah Mary Chassib Jaber; 19 August 1924; Falmouth, Cornwall, England
- Died: 9 October 2016 (aged 92); Manor Park, Uckfield, East Sussex, England
- Other names: Zara Jaber, Zarah Jaber, Zahrah Jaber
- Occupation: Actress

Zahrah Mary Chassib Jaber (19 August 1924 – 9 October 2016) better known by her stage name Zara Nutley, was an English actress. She is best known for her roles in two television comedy series, Mind Your Language (as college principal Miss Courtney) and Never the Twain (as Aunt Eleanor).

== Biography ==
Nutley was born in Cornwall in 1924, (Note: Sources asserting Nutley was born in New Zealand appear to be in error.) the daughter of Stanley Jaber and Gladys Gregory, who married in 1923. She was the granddaughter of Khazʽal Ibn Jabir, the last Sultan of Mohammerah (present-day Khuzestan province, Iran).

Early in her career she was involved in amateur stage productions and subsequently repertory theatre. In the 1950s she studied and later taught at the Florence Moore Drama Studio in Hove, Sussex. Prior to 1977, she was variously billed as Zahrah, Zarah, or Zara Jaber.

In the television sitcom Mind Your Language (1977–1979 and 1986), Nutley played Dolores Courtney, the principal of an adult education college. Her character was scripted as a stern, authoritarian feminist and spinster who was detested and feared by the staff and students at the school. Her other regular television role was the final three seasons of Never the Twain (1981–1991), in which she played Donald Sinden's Aunt Eleanor.

Nutley died aged 92 in Uckfield, East Sussex, on 9 October 2016.

== Filmography ==
Year	Title	Role	Notes
1995	Grange Hill	Eve	1 episode
1994	Lovejoy	Mrs. Addison	Episode: Breaking the Broker
1993	Last of the Summer Wine	Mrs. Jack Attacliffe	Episode: The Black Widow
1988	Gentlemen and Players	Mrs. Fothergill	Episode: One for Sorrow Two for Joy
1987	Terry and June	Mrs Bunce	Episode: The Family Way
1986	Full House	Saleslady	Episode: It's in the Book
1985–1986	Victoria Wood as Seen on TV	Care Home Worker / Headmistress	2 episodes
1984–1991	Never the Twain	Aunt Eleanor	19 episodes
1984	Tales of the Unexpected	Ann Dibbell	Episode: The Mugger
1984	Bottle Boys	Dr. Gardner	Episode: All in a Day's Work
1980	Metal Mickey	Miss Beadle	Episode: Top Secret Mickey
1979	Mr. Selkie	Mrs. Craine	
1978	Within These Walls	Nancy	Episode: Mixer
1977	Spaghetti Two-Step	Mrs. Danby	TV film
1977–1986	Mind Your Language	Miss Dolores Courtney	42 episodes
1976	Dawnbreakers		Short film
1975	Prometheus: The Life of Balzac	Madame du Bordello	Episode: The Human Comedy
1974	Father Brown	Nurse	Episode: The Dagger with Wings
1974	Dial M for Murder	Serafina	Episode: Frame
1973	Second City Firsts	Mrs. Shakespeare	Episode: The Movers
1973	Jane Eyre	Grace Poole	4 episodes
