= The Mystery of Edwin Drood (1993 film) =

- A&E DVD cover
- Directed by: Timothy Forder
- Written by: Charles Dickens (novel); Timothy Forder
- Produced by: Keith Hayley, Jo Gilbert
- Starring: Jonathan Phillips; Robert Powell; Finty Williams
- Cinematography: Martin McGrath
- Edited by: Sue Alhadeff
- Music by: Kick Production
- Distributed by: A&E Home Video (USA); Curzon Gold Video (AUS)
- Release date: 23 April 1993
- Running time: 112 minutes
- Country: United Kingdom
- Language: English
- Box office: £1,579 (UK)

The Mystery of Edwin Drood is a 1993 film, the fourth film adaptation of the Charles Dickens unfinished 1870 novel of the same name. This was the last film of Barry Evans.

== Cast ==
- Robert Powell as John Jasper
- Jonathan Phillips as Edwin Drood
- Peter Pacey as Septimus Crisparkle
- Nanette Newman as Mrs. Crisparkle
- Freddie Jones as Sapsea
- Gemma Craven as Miss Twinkleton
- Marc Sinden as Mr Honeythunder
- Rosemary Leach as Mrs. Tope
- Glyn Houston as Grewgious
- Andrew Sachs as Durdles
- Barry Evans as Bazzard
- Ronald Fraser as Dean
- Finty Williams as Rosa

== Locations ==
Many scenes were filmed in Rochester, including Minor Canon Row and Rochester Cathedral which doubled as Cloisterham Cathedral.
