= Darkness Falls (1999 film) =

- Directed by: Gerry Lively
- Written by: John Howlett
- Based on: Dangerous Obsession by N. J. Crisp
- Produced by: Alan Latham; Clifford Haydn-Tovey
- Starring: Sherilyn Fenn; Ray Winstone; Tim Dutton
- Cinematography: Adam Santelli
- Edited by: David Spiers
- Music by: Guy Farley
- Production companies: Film Development Corporation; Isle of Man Film Commission; Vine International Pictures
- Distributed by: Lionsgate Home Entertainment
- Release date: 27 August 1999
- Running time: 92 minutes
- Country: United Kingdom
- Language: English

Darkness Falls is a 1999 British drama film by John Howlett, very loosely adapted from N. J. Crisp's psychological thriller Dangerous Obsession and directed by Gerry Lively. The film was shot in late 1997 on the Isle of Man.

== Plot ==
With his pregnant wife at death's door after a car crash, desperate husband John Barrett (Ray Winstone) invades the home of Mark Driscoll (Tim Dutton) and holds both Driscoll and his rich, neglected wife Sally (Sherilyn Fenn) hostage in order to understand the events that led to his wife ending up in a coma.

== Cast ==
- Ray Winstone as John Barrett
- Sherilyn Fenn as Sally Driscoll
- Tim Dutton as Mark Driscoll
- Robin McCaffrey as Jane Barrett
- Michael Praed as The Hitman
