= Teddy Turner =

British actor (1917–1992)

- Born: Joseph Edward Turner; 13 June 1917; Yorkshire, England
- Died: 29 August 1992 (aged 75); Horsforth, Yorkshire, England
- Occupation: Television actor

Joseph Edward Turner (13 June 1917 – 29 August 1992) was a Yorkshire-born English actor and comedian who played dustbin man Chalky Whiteley in the soap opera Coronation Street. He also played the part of the similarly named farmer Bill Whiteley in Emmerdale from 1989 to 1990. In the late 1970s (and all the way up to the final series in 1990) he played the part of Mrs. Pumphrey's manservant Hodgekin in All Creatures Great and Small, Gordon in Open All Hours and subsequently the part of Banks in the popular 1980s sitcom Never the Twain. He also made occasional appearances in Last of the Summer Wine. He died of emphysema in 1992 at the age of 75.

== Selected filmography ==
Year	Title	Role	Notes
1975	Coronation Street	Caretaker	1 episode
1976	Hadleigh	First Man	Episode: "Favours"
1976	It Shouldn't Happen to a Vet	Judge	Film
1976	Yanks Go Home	Mr. Clegg	2 episodes
1977	Crown Court	Charles Hunt	3 episodes
1977	Play for Today	Councillor	Episode: "The Mayor's Charity"
1977	This Time Next Year	Ernest Shaw	9 episodes (mini-series)
1978	Emmerdale	Tom Hawker	3 episodes
1978	Last of the Summer Wine	Edgar/ Postman	2 episodes
1978	Oh No It's Selwyn Froggitt	Postman	3 episodes
1978	The Onedin Line	Barnabus	Episode: "No Smoke Without Fire"
1978	Strangers	Jess Green	Episode: "Paying Guests"
1978 – 1990	All Creatures Great and Small	Hodgkin	13 episodes
1979	Dracula	Swales	Film
1979	Ripping Yarns	Chairman	Episode: "Golden Gordon"
1980	Flickers	Eddie Marco	2 episodes
1980	Sounding Brass	Frank Oldfield	6 episodes
1981 – 1982	Open All Hours	Gordon Stackpool	2 episodes
1981 – 1988	Never the Twain	Banks	35 episodes
1982	Play for Today	Old Tom	Episode: "England's Green and Pleasant Land"
1982 – 1983	Coronation Street	Chalkie Whiteley	60 episodes
1985	The Practice	Willie Wilson	4 episodes
1986	Screen Two	Old Man	Episode: "The Insurance Man"
1987	Bulman	Blind Jack	Episode: "W.C. Fields Was Right"
1989 – 1990	Emmerdale	Bill Whiteley	31 episodes
