= Jeremy Sinden =

English actor (1950–1996)

- Born: Jeremy Mahony Sinden; 14 June 1950; London, England
- Died: 29 May 1996 (aged 45); London, England
- Spouse: Delia Lindsay (m. 1978)
- Children: 2
- Parent(s): Donald Sinden; Diana Mahony
- Relatives: Marc Sinden (brother)

Jeremy Mahony Sinden (14 June 1950 – 29 May 1996) was an English actor, known for his roles as eccentric military men and overgrown schoolboys.

== Early life ==
Sinden was born on 14 June 1950 in London into a theatrical family; both his parents were actors. His father was Sir Donald Sinden and his mother was Diana Mahony. He was educated at Edgeborough and Lancing College.

== Career ==
=== Theatre ===
Sinden worked at the Pitlochry Festival Theatre, training as an assistant stage manager. While working in that position for two seasons in Stratford-upon-Avon with the Royal Shakespeare Company in 1970-71, he also understudied 45 different roles. He appeared in pantomime and rep in Bournemouth, Farnham, Leatherhead and Windsor, and he worked one season at the Chichester Festival Theatre.

He enrolled at the London Academy of Music and Dramatic Art (LAMDA), where he studied for three years and won the Forsyth Award. Whilst still at drama school, he made his West End stage acting début in 1972 at the Cambridge Theatre as Private Broughton in R. C. Sherriff's Journey's End. Returning to the Chichester Festival Theatre, he appeared in four plays there.

Sinden played Baloo the Bear in a 1984 West End production of Rudyard Kipling's The Jungle Book at the Adelphi Theatre, a production that also featured Fenella Fielding as Kaa the Python. In 1994 he appeared at the Royal National Theatre as Major Swindon in Shaw's The Devil's Disciple.

His last performance was also for the National, the following year at the Old Vic, playing Toad in Alan Bennett's adaptation of The Wind in the Willows. The Times reviewer described his performance as "a nice smug Toad, who wears everything down to his convict's arrows like a model on a Paris catwalk."

=== Film ===
Sinden made his film debut as rebel fighter pilot "Gold Two" in Star Wars (1977). His character was later identified as Dex Tiree in the 2015 reference book, Ultimate Star Wars.

He appeared in such films as Rosie Dixon – Night Nurse (1978); Chariots of Fire (1981) playing the president of the Gilbert and Sullivan society; Ascendancy (1983); Madame Sousatzka (1988); The Object of Beauty (1991); Let Him Have It (1991) and The Innocent (1993).

=== TV ===
Sinden's work on television included playing Anthony Mortimer in Crossroads for two years, The Expert, Danger UXB, Henry Weldon in Have His Carcase, 'Boy' Mulcaster in Brideshead Revisited, The Far Pavilions, Never the Twain, Robin of Sherwood, Lord Mountbatten: The Last Viceroy, Middlemarch, The House of Windsor and As Time Goes By. His last role was as Mr Barling in The Famous Five series episode Five Go To Smugglers Top, which was dedicated to him following its broadcast in 1996.

== Personal life ==
Sinden married actress Delia Lindsay in 1978. They had two daughters.

On 4 September 1968, Sinden and his brother Marc were part of the "Na-Na" chorus on "Hey Jude", recording and filming the song with the Beatles at Twickenham Film Studios.

== Death ==
In the mid-1990s Sinden developed lung cancer. This occurred at the same time as his best friend, Simon Cadell, was diagnosed with non-Hodgkin lymphoma. Cadell's father, John Cadell, had been Donald Sinden's theatrical agent for more than 30 years. On 29 May 1996, twelve weeks after Cadell's death, Sinden died aged 45.

== Filmography ==
=== Film ===
Year	Title	Role	Notes
1977	Star Wars	Dex Tiree (Gold Two)	
1978	Rosie Dixon – Night Nurse	Dr. Robert Fishlock	
1981	Chariots of Fire	President-Gilbert & Sullivan Society	
1981	Mark Gertler: Fragments of a Biography	Vorticist	
1982	Doll's Eye	Business Executive	
1983	Ascendancy	Darcy	
1988	Madame Sousatzka	Woodford	
1991	The Object of Beauty	Jonathan	
1991	Let Him Have It	Soames Daily Telegraph	
1993	The Innocent	Captain Lofting	

=== Television ===
Year	Title	Role	Notes
1976	The Sweeney	Detective Constable Feast	1 episode
1976	The Expert	Price	9 episodes
1976–1978	Crossroads	Anthony Mortimer	20 episodes
1979	Danger UXB	Lieutenant Ivor Rodgers	10 episodes
1981	Brideshead Revisited	Boy Mulcaster	4 episodes
1984	The Far Pavilions	Raikes	2 episodes
1986	Robin of Sherwood	Mortimer	1 episode
1986	Lord Mountbatten: The Last Viceroy	Ronald Brockman	6 episodes
1987	Lord Peter Wimsey: Have His Carcase	Henry Weldon	4 episodes
1994	Middlemarch	Captain Lydgate	3 episodes
1994	The House of Windsor	Giles Huntingdon	6 episodes
1995	The Famous Five	Barling	2 episodes
1996	As Time Goes By	Alan	2 episodes
