= Tim Dutton =

British actor (born 1964)

- Born: Tim Dutton; 1964 (age 61–62); Cheltenham, Gloucestershire, England
- Years active: 1991–present

Tim Dutton (born 1964) is a British stage, film, and television actor. Dutton's films include Darkness Falls (1999), The Bourne Identity (2002), The Infiltrator (2016) and The Detonator. He starred in the movie Tom & Viv (1994) as Maurice Haigh-Wood.

Dutton grew up in Stratford-upon-Avon, Warwickshire. He read Law at Wolverhampton University and gained an LL.B with Honours before turning to acting.

Dutton played Mark Owens in Soldier, Soldier, Donna Tucker's tutor and lover (4 episodes, 1994). He had a recurring role in the Fox television series Ally McBeal as Brian Selig, a love interest of Calista Flockhart’s title character. He played D.S. Bailey for two seasons (1992-93) in "The Inspector Alleyn Mysteries." He also starred in the CBS sitcom Thanks. He made an appearance in the Press Gang episode "Chance is a Fine Thing" as Clark Kent, Judy's jealous boyfriend. He has worked twice with the writer Alan Bleasdale, starring in Melissa with Jenifer Ehle (1997) and Oliver Twist (1999). In 2001 he starred in the ABC comedy pilot H.M.O. with John Cleese, playing two ex-pat surgeons in a LA hospital. He played Simon Aston in “The Great and the Good”, S2:E4 of Lewis (2008). In 2010 he produced and starred in The Rendezvous. He has twice starred with the actress Tara Fitzgerald, in director Ferdinand Fairfax's Frenchman’s Creek (1998) and In the Name of Love (1999).

In 2019, he played the series uber-villain and ‘God Father of Bethnal Green’ Joseph Merceron In the BBC series Poldark. Series writer Debbie Horsfield has stated about his character: “Joseph Merceron was utterly, utterly vile and utterly without mercy. He appeared to have no kind conscience, no morality. I personally think he’s actually the worst Poldark villain of them all!”

His theatre credits include plays in the West End (London Assurance), Chichester Festival Theatre (Love's Labour’s Lost, Victory), The Royal Exchange Manchester (She’s in Your Hands), twice working with director Sam Mendes.

Dutton made a major stage appearance in 2014 in Headlong's highly acclaimed production of 1984 directed by Robert Icke, at the Almeida and later in the West End and Internationally. He played the false friend and Party apparatchik, O'Brien, for which he won Best Featured Actor, Broadway World, Los Angeles Awards.

== Filmography ==
| Year | Title | Role | Notes |
|---|---|---|---|
| 1991 | A Murder of Quality | Simon Snow | TV movie |
| 1992 | Patriot Games | Constable | |
| 1994 | Tom & Viv | Maurice Haigh-Wood | |
| 1997 | Into Thin Air: Death on Everest | Andy Harris | TV movie |
| 1998 | Hard to Forget | Max Warner | TV movie |
| 1998 | St. Ives | François | |
| 1999 | Darkness Falls | Mark Driscoll | |
| 2001 | Dead by Monday | Alex Hiller | |
| 2002 | The Bourne Identity | Eamon | |
| 2004 | Tooth | Dad | |
| 2004 | The Queen of Sheba's Pearls | Father Talbot | |
| 2005 | Terminal | Mike | |
| 2006 | Bye Bye Harry! | Stuart | |
| 2006 | The Detonator | Josef Bostanescu | |
| 2010 | The Rendezvous | Michael | |
| 2013 | Delight | Gregor | |
| 2016 | The Infiltrator | Ian Howard | |
| 2023 | The Crown | Michael Middleton | |
