= Homewood School =

Coordinates: 51°04′43″N 0°41′36″E

Homewood School and Sixth Form Centre

Location
- Ashford Road Tenterden; Tenterden, Kent, TN30 6LT; England

Information
- Type: Academy and Sixth form college
- Motto: Learning, Respect, Belonging
- Local authority: Kent
- Specialist: Arts College & Applied Learning Operational
- Department for Education URN: 137484 Tables
- Ofsted: Reports
- Principal: Jeremy Single
- Gender: Mixed
- Age: 11 to 19
- Enrolment: 2,068 out of a capacity of 2,156 as of November 2021
- Houses: Communities: Endeavour; Fortitude; Pioneer; Quest; Voyager; Sixth form
- Colours: Blue, White (Changed since 2021)
- Website: https://www.homewood-school.co.uk

Homewood School and Sixth Form Centre is an academy school in Tenterden, Kent, England. Homewood is a non-selective school, but is situated within the Kent selective system. It has been awarded specialist Arts College status. It provides education for students from the town itself and surrounding villages. It is the largest secondary school in Kent and one of the 10 largest secondary schools in the United Kingdom as of the end of 2020. The school is current rated 'Good' by Ofsted.
