= Marc Sinden =

English actor and filmmaker (born 1954)

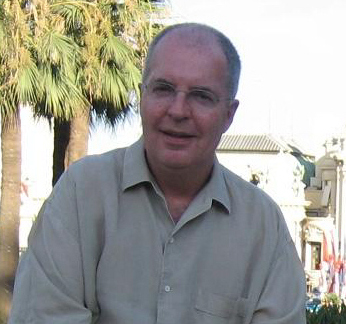
- Sinden in 2007
- Born: 9 May 1954 (age 72); London, England
- Education: Bristol Old Vic Theatre School
- Occupations: Actor, director, producer
- Spouse: Jo Gilbert (m. 1977; div. 1997)
- Children: 2
- Parent(s): Donald Sinden; Diana Sinden
- Relatives: Jeremy Sinden (brother)

Marcus Andrew Sinden (born 9 May 1954) is an English actor, director and producer.

Sinden has worked in film and theatre (mainly in London's West End) as both actor and producer and directed the documentary series Great West End Theatres, detailing the history of ten of the forty major playhouses in London. He was artistic director of the Mermaid Theatre and inaugurated the British Theatre Season in Monaco, which was awarded a Royal Warrant by Prince Albert of Monaco. His first West End production was nominated for a Laurence Olivier Award for Best Entertainment and another won the Stage Award for Best Ensemble work at the Edinburgh Festival Fringe. He is also the director and co-author of the touring anthology Seven Deadly Sins Four Deadly Sinners and was nominated for a Sony Award for his voice-overs for Apple Computer's TV advertisements.

His father was the actor Donald Sinden.

In 1968, he and his older brother, actor Jeremy Sinden, were part of the "Na-Na" chorus on "Hey Jude" by the Beatles.

== As producer ==
=== Theatre ===
In 1993, Sinden became the artistic director at Bernard Miles' Mermaid Theatre in Blackfriars, London where he created the Bernard Miles Studio, but left after a year. He then formed his own theatrical production company, presenting in 1996 the première of N.J. Crisp's That Good Night on a national tour starring Donald Sinden, Patrick Ryecart and Nigel Davenport and (directing his first commercial tour) Edward Hall. During this period he also produced a series of audio tapes (re-released as CDs in 2010) including The Ballad of Reading Gaol read by Donald Sinden and The Fairy Tales of Oscar Wilde, with readings by Judi Dench, Jeremy Irons, Derek Jacobi, Joanna Lumley, Geoffrey Palmer and Elaine Stritch.

In 1997, Sinden was appointed associate producer for Bill Kenwright Ltd. As associate producer, his West End credits are Lady Windermere's Fan (Haymarket); An Ideal Husband (Haymarket and Gielgud) and Pygmalion (Albery), which he cast and co-directed. Marc was responsible for some of the output of the Theatre Royal, Windsor. He also cast and produced such shows and subsequent tours as Catch Me If You Can; Canaries Sometimes Sing; My Fat Friend; Dangerous To Know; Huckleberry Finn; Aladdin; Pygmalion (tour); Lady Windermere's Fan (a co-production tour with the Royal Exchange, Manchester); Noël and Gertie; Passion (in concert at the Golders Green Hippodrome for CD recording); Fallen Angels; The Woman in Black; Move Over Mrs Markham and Time's Up. He liaised between Bill Kenwright and the Peter Hall Company, for which he cast and was associate producer on the tour of the première of Just The Three of Us by Simon Gray and helped organise the Australian co-production tour of An Ideal Husband.

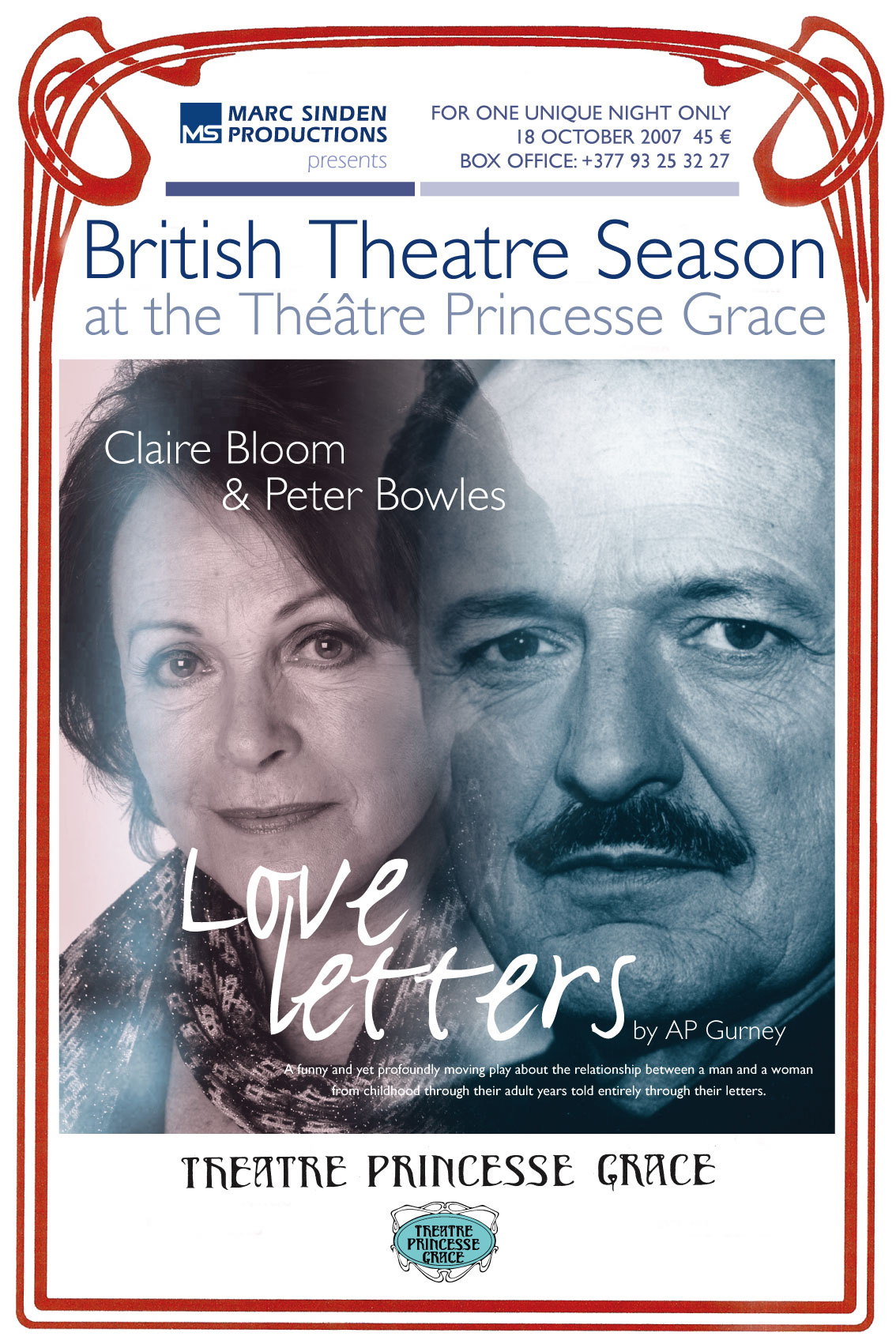
Poster for the British Theatre Season, Monaco

In 1998, he resumed his independent career as Marc Sinden Productions and produced and co-directed Shakespeare's Villains (Haymarket) with Steven Berkoff, which was nominated for a Society of London Theatre Laurence Olivier Award for Best Entertainment. In 2000 the production won the LA Weekly Theater Award for Solo Performance. He also produced the 25th anniversary revival of East, directed by the plays author Steven Berkoff, winning the Stage Award for Best Ensemble work at the Edinburgh Festival Fringe, (Pleasance Courtyard, Edinburgh; Le Théâtre Silvia Monfort, Paris & Vaudeville). Sinden is also the producer of Berkoff's An Actors Lament, Berkoff's first verse-play since Decadence in 1981.

Other productions include The Glee Club (Duchess) following its transfer from the Bush Theatre; Seven Deadly Sins Four Deadly Sinners, which he directed and also co-wrote with Carry On... writer Norman Hudis, which is still touring internationally; Asking For Trouble with Sheridan Morley; Sex Wars with Louise Jameson and Straker Sings Brel directed by Mel Smith.

He inaugurated the British Theatre Season, Monaco, bringing English-language theatrical shows to the Théâtre Princesse Grace in Monte Carlo. On 17 October 2007, Prince Albert II of Monaco awarded the British Theatre Season his High Patronage.

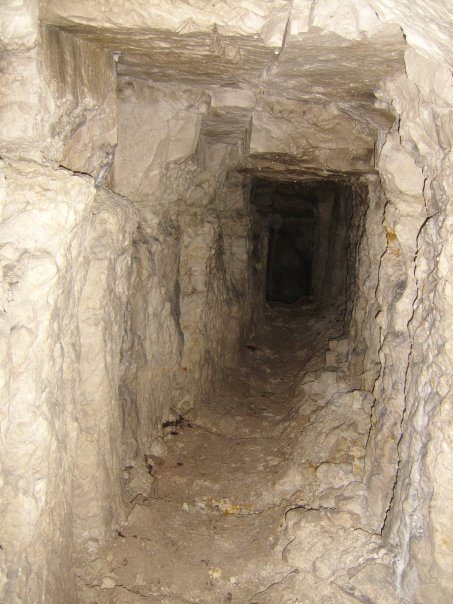
One of the tunnels in Vimy Ridge where the mines were laid

=== Film and documentaries ===
Sinden is co-producing the new thriller The Quiet Kill, currently in pre-production at Elstree Film Studios, filming in 2027 with release due at the end of that year.

He is a producer with his former wife Jo Gilbert and director of the 40-part documentary series Great West End Theatres and was the producer of the DVD release An Evening with... Sir Donald Sinden, filmed at Pinewood Studios and Steven Berkoff's East, filmed in front of a live audience at the Vaudeville Theatre, London in 1999.

He is the co-producer of the film version of N.J. Crisp's That Good Night filmed in Portugal starring John Hurt and Charles Dance and released in 2017.

In August 1998, Sinden was producing a documentary at Vimy Ridge in Arras, northern France about the First World War underground mines (as mentioned in the Sebastian Faulks novel Birdsong) when Lt-Col Mike Watkins, the Head of Explosive Ordnance Disposal and the British Army's leading bomb disposal expert who was in charge of the decommissioning of the huge bombs (including one of 6,500 lb) in the 20-mile subterranean complex, was killed in an accident underground. Sinden said that Lt-Col Watkins was "A hero who had saved countless lives through his bomb disposal work. His work was often secretive and undercover and it would have put him in danger to publicise his action while he was alive, but now he is dead it does not matter. I admired him more than anyone I have ever met."

== As director ==
=== Theatre ===
Sinden co-directed Shakespeare's Villains (Haymarket) with Steven Berkoff, which was nominated for a Society of London Theatre Laurence Olivier Award for Best Entertainment and Seven Deadly Sins Four Deadly Sinners, which he directed and also co-wrote with Carry On... writer Norman Hudis, which is still touring.

=== Film and documentaries ===
Charles Spencer, the drama critic for the Daily Telegraph, reported that Sinden was "directing the (planned) 40-part documentary series Great West End Theatres, in which Donald Sinden tells the history and stories associated with each of the main London theatres."

In the event, only ten episodes were completed. In their review of those ten episodes, the British Theatre Guide said, "This film is as close as one can get to standing on the stage taking an ovation. This series is beautifully filmed and gets the balance exactly right between classy camera work, history, reminiscence and gossip." The Daily Telegraph review stated that the "lovely documentary series is made by the director Marc Sinden. Its star, and – it transpires – the best documentary frontman of all time, is his actor-father: Sir Donald Sinden. Sir Donald has been let loose, offering anecdotes and memories apparently as they occur to him and the effect is enchanting beyond belief. It is also, at times, incredibly funny. It seems to me rather important that the series should be completed: this is popular history at its best."

The series was broadcast in 2013 in the UK on Sky Arts 2.

Sinden is a Professional member of the Directors Guild of Great Britain and Directors UK and a Director member of Francis Ford Coppola's Zoetrope Virtual Studio, where he has a private office.

== As actor ==
=== Theatre ===
Sinden's acting work in the theatre includes over 40 regional tours or West End productions to his credit, including 'Charles Surface' in The School for Scandal (Duke of York's) with his father Donald Sinden and directed by John Barton. This was chosen as the British Council's 50th anniversary tour, playing in 21 cities in 10 countries. He also starred in Her Royal Highness? (Palace) and Two into One (Shaftesbury), both written and directed by Ray Cooney; 'Squire Sullen' in The Beaux' Stratagem (Lyttelton, Royal National Theatre) opposite Brenda Blethyn and Stephen Dillane; Over My Dead Body (Savoy) with June Whitfield; Underground with Raymond Burr (Prince of Wales and Royal Alexandra, Toronto); Ross with Simon Ward (Old Vic and Royal Alexandra, Toronto); Ray Davies' first musical Chorus Girls (Theatre Royal, Stratford East) written by Barrie Keeffe and the première of Alan Bennett's Enjoy (Vaudeville) with Joan Plowright, directed by Ronald Eyre.

A season at the Chichester Festival Theatre included 'Stephen Undershaft' in George Bernard Shaw's Major Barbara with Donald Sinden, directed by Christopher Morahan and as assistant director, Sam Mendes; at the Gaiety Theatre, Dublin, 'Broadbent' in Shaw's rarely seen John Bull's Other Island with Cyril Cusack, directed by Joe Dowling; 'Cassius' in a national tour of Julius Caesar for the New Shakespeare Company and a 12-month national tour of Noël Coward's Private Lives with Gemma Craven.

=== Film ===
In 1962, aged 8, Sinden was originally offered the lead title role in the film Sammy Going South by its director, Alexander Mackendrick, but his father turned the offer down on his son's behalf, saying that "only a handful of child actors ever make it as adult actors and if Marc wants to be an actor, he should wait until he is old enough to make the decision himself." He appeared as 'Surveyor White' in the film version of Spike Milligan's novel Puckoon with Richard Attenborough, filmed at the Paint Hall Studios in Belfast; 'Senior Allied Officer White' in the comedy The Brylcreem Boys with Gabriel Byrne, Billy Campbell and Jean Butler filmed in the Isle of Man; 'Fr. Dennis' in Property of the State, the first film made at the Shackleton Studios in County Londonderry; 'Captain Dawson' in Clash of Loyalties with Oliver Reed, filmed in Iraq by cinematographer Jack Hildyard; the French film Mangeuses d'Hommes filmed in Sierra Leone; Decadence with Steven Berkoff and Joan Collins filmed in Luxembourg; the Italian film Piccolo Grande Amore with Susannah York and David Warner filmed in Austria; 'Lord Dolman' in Michael Winner's The Wicked Lady with Faye Dunaway, Alan Bates and John Gielgud with cinematography by Jack Cardiff; White Nights with Mikhail Baryshnikov, Helen Mirren and Isabella Rossellini (which was the Royal Film Performance of 1986); 'Captain Perez' in Carry On Columbus directed by Gerald Thomas, filmed by Alan Hume and produced by Sinden's godfather Peter Rogers and was 'Mr. Honeythunder' in Charles Dickens' The Mystery of Edwin Drood with Robert Powell.

=== Television ===
He is probably best known for playing Inspector Stokesay in Magnum, P.I. with Tom Selleck and as Martyn Price in the BAFTA and Emmy award-winning The Politician's Wife with Trevor Eve and Juliet Stevenson. He has appeared in Judge John Deed; the series Island set on Jersey and has also had roles in the BBC TV drama series' Century Falls and Country Boy; Against All Odds – The Promise with Roy Marsden; Never the Twain; Bergerac; Peter Tinniswood's Home Front with Brenda Bruce; Barry Morse presents Strange But True; Rumpole of the Bailey with Leo McKern; Emmerdale; If You Go Down in the Woods Today with Eric Sykes; Desmond Elliott in the original series of Crossroads; Joss Melford, opposite Lindsay Duncan in the episode Deadlier Than the Male, in Dick Turpin with Richard O'Sullivan; All at No 20 with Maureen Lipman; Shoestring with Trevor Eve and Wolf to the Slaughter (the first of the Ruth Rendell/Inspector Wexford TV adaptations).

He was also nominated in 1981 for a Sony Award for his voice-overs for Apple Computer TV advertisements.

=== "Hey Jude" film recording ===
On 4 September 1968, Sinden and his brother Jeremy were part of the "Na-Na" chorus on "Hey Jude", recording and filming the song with the Beatles at Twickenham Film Studios.

== Personal life ==
Sinden is divorced from the film producer Jo Gilbert and has two children from that marriage, both involved in the film industry. He is the son of actor Donald Sinden and his wife, actress Diana Mahony and the brother of the late actor Jeremy Sinden.

After leaving Stanbridge Earls school in 1971 aged 17, Sinden studied on the acting course at the Bristol Old Vic Theatre School from 1971 to 1973 alongside fellow student Pete Postlethwaite. Following this, he became a jeweller at H. Knowles Brown in Hampstead, London for five years. Marrying in 1977, he returned to acting in 1978, starting as an acting/ASM in weekly-repertory.

Investigative journalist James Montague, writing in the July 2014 issue of Esquire magazine, claimed that Sinden spied for the British Government's Secret Intelligence Service (MI6) during the filming of Clash of Loyalties in Iraq, after being made "an offer he couldn't refuse, appealing to his duty and his pride in Queen and Country." Sinden confirmed this to be the case in the article.

He is an atheist and secularist, a Fellow of the Zoological Society, a Liveryman of the Worshipful Company of Innholders and was awarded the Freedom of the City of London by the Lord Mayor Sir Kenneth Cork. He is an active supporter of Europeanism and the European Union.

In Debrett's People of Today he lists his recreations as "exploring Provence, clay pigeon shooting and cigars" and is a member of the Noël Coward Society, the Clay Pigeon Shooting Association, Guards Polo Club and The Club at The Ivy.

Sinden was nominated for the Cigar Smoker of the Year Award at the inaugural gala award ceremony in 2013, sponsored by The Spectator magazine and again in 2015.
