= Donald Sinden =

English actor (1923–2014)

Sir Donald Sinden CBE FRSA
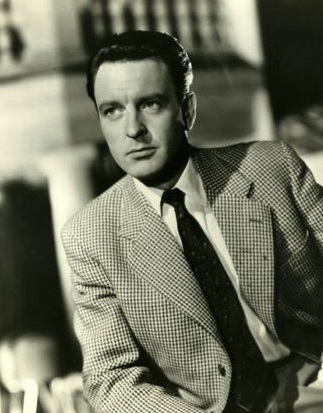
- Pinewood Studios publicity shot, c. 1956
- Born: Donald Alfred Sinden; 9 October 1923; Plymouth, Devon, England
- Died: 12 September 2014 (aged 90); Wittersham, Kent, England
- Occupation: Actor
- Years active: 1941–2013
- Spouse: Diana Mahony (m. 1948; died 2004)
- Children: Jeremy; Marc
- Awards: Knight Bachelor; CBE; FRSA; see awards table

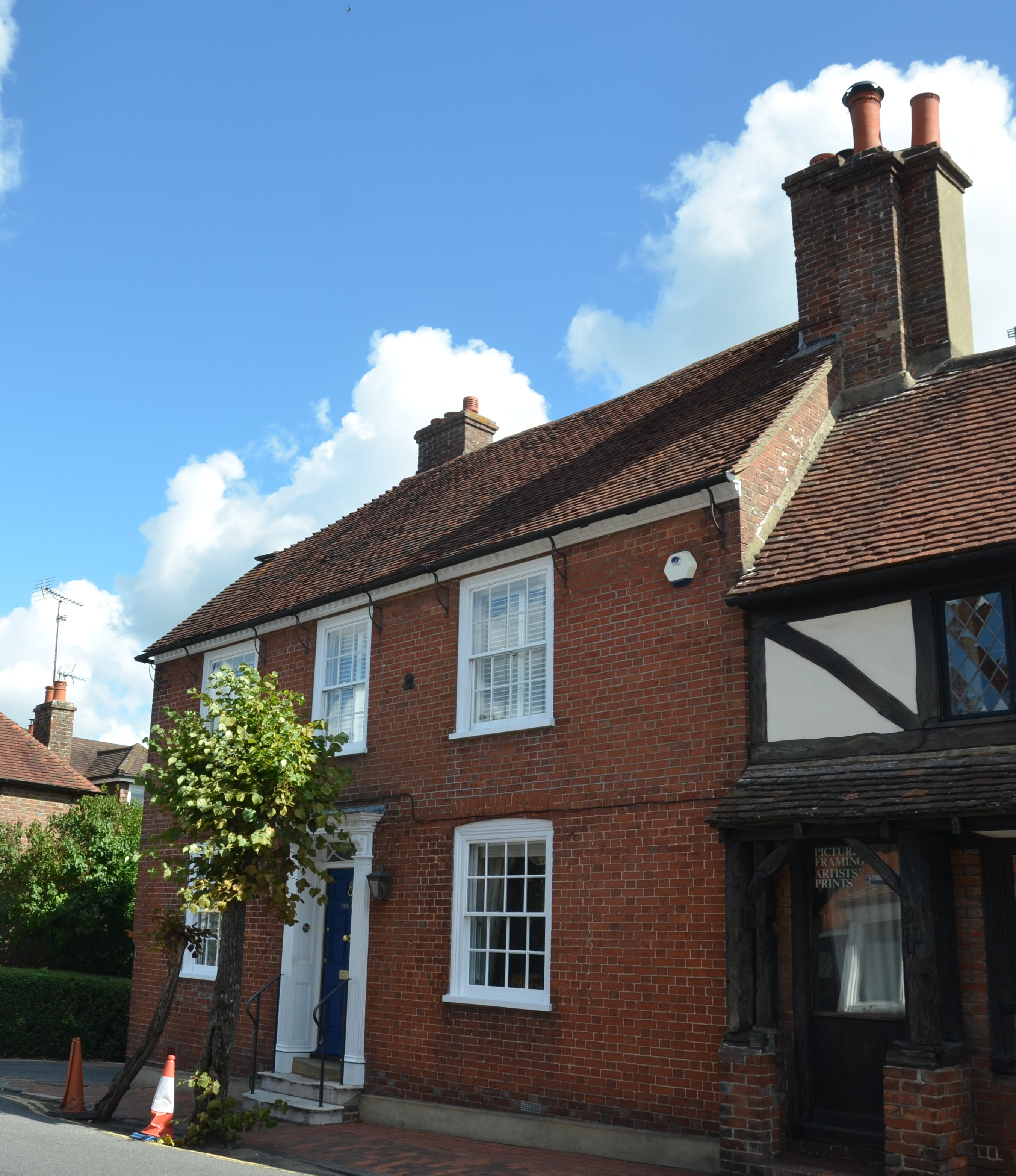
The Limes, Ditchling, Sinden's childhood home

Sir Donald Alfred Sinden (9 October 1923 – 12 September 2014) was an English actor.

Sinden featured in the film Mogambo (1953), and achieved early fame as a Rank Organisation film star in the 1950s in films including The Cruel Sea (1953), Doctor in the House (1954), Simba (1955), Eyewitness (1956) and Doctor at Large (1957).

He became highly regarded as an award-winning Shakespearean and West End theatre actor and television sitcom star, winning the 1977 Evening Standard Award for Best Actor for King Lear, and starring in the sitcoms Two's Company (1975–79) and Never the Twain (1981–91).

== Early life ==
Sinden was born in St Budeaux, Plymouth, Devon on 9 October 1923, the middle child of chemist Alfred Edward Sinden and his wife Mabel Agnes (née Fuller). His elder sister Joy became an English teacher at Claverham Community College in Battle, East Sussex, and younger brother Leon (1927–2015) became an actor. They grew up in Ditchling, East Sussex, where their home 'The Limes' doubled as the local chemist's shop. After attending a number of private schools, Donald was sent to Hassocks Primary, and thence to Burgess Hill Secondary School after failing his 11-plus qualifying test.

== Career ==
Sinden made his first stage appearance at the amateur Brighton Little Theatre (of which he later became president) in 1941, stepping into a part in place of his cousin Frank, who had been called up to war and so was unable to appear. Offered a professional acting part by the Brighton impresario Charles F. Smith, he made his first professional appearance in January 1942, playing Dudley in a production of George and Margaret for the Mobile Entertainments Southern Area company (known as MESA) and in other modern comedies, playing to the armed forces all along the South Coast of England during the Second World War and later trained as an actor for two terms at the Webber Douglas Academy of Dramatic Art.

Rejected for World War II naval service because of asthma, Sinden joined a theatrical company that entertained soldiers, sailors and airmen during the war.

In 1942, in Hove, Sinden befriended Lord Alfred Douglas (known as "Bosie"), who had been Oscar Wilde's lover. He is believed to have been the last surviving person to have known Douglas.

== Rank Organisation and Pinewood Studios ==
After the critical and financial success of his first screen leading role in The Cruel Sea (1953), made by Ealing Studios, in which he co-starred and received top billing with Jack Hawkins, Sinden was contracted for seven years to the Rank Organisation at Pinewood Studios and subsequently had prominent roles in 23 movies during the 1950s and early 1960s, including Mogambo, Doctor in the House, Above Us the Waves, The Black Tent, Eyewitness, Doctor at Large, The Siege of Sidney Street and Twice Round the Daffodils.

Sinden became associated with his character of "Benskin" in the Doctor film series as the duffel-coated medical student, regularly failing his finals and spending most of his time chasing pretty nurses, accompanied by his trade-mark "wolf-growl".

Sinden was the recipient of several "audience-based" awards during this period, including "The actor who made most progress during 1954". In 1956, a profile was written on him which stated:

In the three years since his début in The Cruel Sea, the un-temperamental Sinden has moved steadily up the British film ladder until people are noticing, not without surprise, that he is suddenly one of the country's prime box-office favourites. It's as though he arrived on tiptoe. He is not colourful or flamboyant, yet he has his niche in public favour, as a recent poll proved: British women-folk voted him "The face we'd most like to see across our breakfast table." This defines with a certain accuracy the sure, dependable appeal of the man who, so far, has shared star billing with some other more boisterous male idols. He has usually been left, crestfallen and jilted, in the last reel.

However, Sinden never became a top movie star.

== Theatre ==
=== Commercial theatre ===
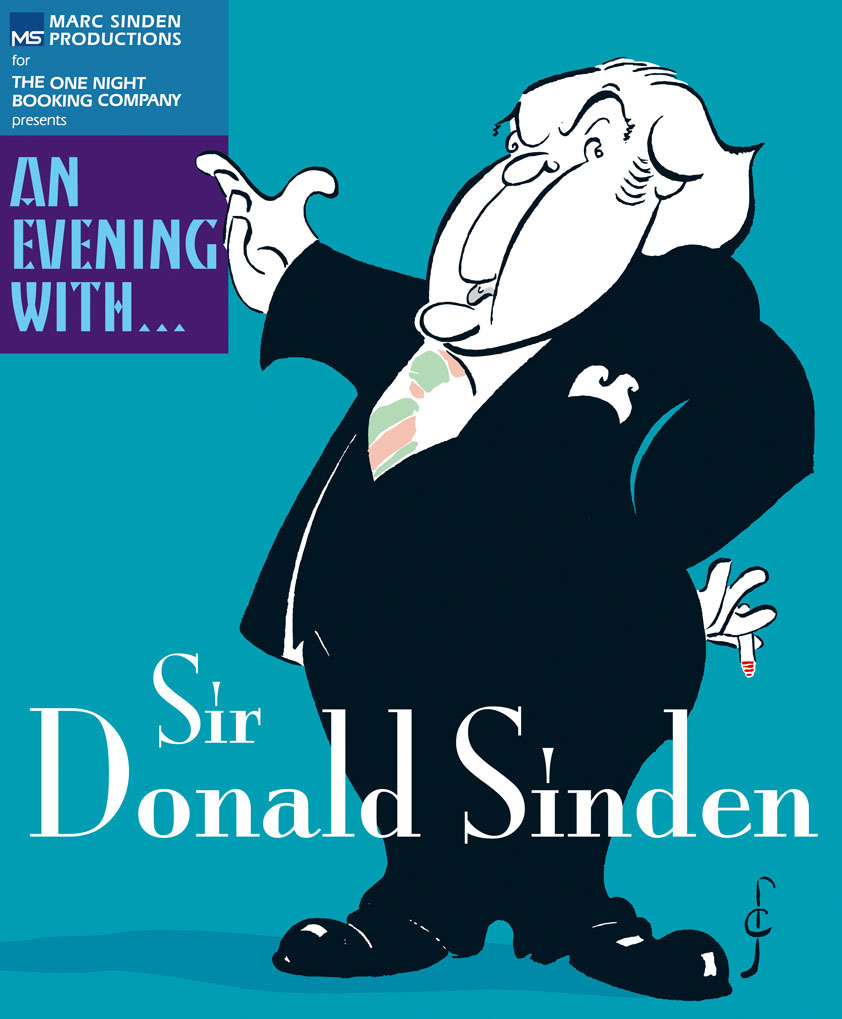
Production poster for An Evening with... Sir Donald Sinden

In 1949, he appeared in The Heiress at the Theatre Royal, Haymarket opposite Ralph Richardson and Peggy Ashcroft, directed by John Gielgud. In his Sky Arts documentary series Great West End Theatres, Sinden said that the play ran for 644 performances (19 months) and he was the only member of the cast not to have missed a performance: "As the play is the longest run in the [Haymarket] theatre's history, I therefore gave more consecutive performances in this theatre than any other actor since it was built in 1820." The management gave him an engraved silver ashtray as a present in recognition of the fact, which he showed in the episode.

Theatre being his first "love", he was a noted farceur and won best actor awards for his appearances in the Ray Cooney farces Not Now, Darling (1967), Two into One (1984) and Out of Order (1990). In 1976, he was nominated for a Tony Award as Best Actor for his performance on Broadway as Arthur Wicksteed in Alan Bennett's comedy Habeas Corpus. His other notable leading performances in the commercial theatre included roles in productions such as There's a Girl in My Soup (1966), In Praise of Love (1973), An Enemy of the People (1975), Present Laughter (1981), The School for Scandal (1983), The Scarlet Pimpernel (1985), Major Barbara (1988), Diversions and Delights (one-man show as Oscar Wilde, 1989), She Stoops to Conquer (1993), That Good Night (1996) and Quartet (1999).

Sinden was a leading figure in the campaign to found the Theatre Museum in London's Covent Garden in the 1980s. In 2007, Sinden embarked on a UK, European and American theatre tour to talk about his life, work and anecdotes in An Evening with... Sir Donald Sinden. Produced by his son Marc, this included, on 8 November 2007 as part of Marc's British Theatre Season, Monaco, a performance in front of Prince Albert of Monaco (the son of Grace Kelly, his co-star in the film Mogambo) at the Théâtre Princesse Grace, Monte Carlo.

=== Royal Shakespeare Company ===
Joining the Shakespeare Memorial Theatre company in 1946, Sinden was an Associate Artist of the Royal Shakespeare Company (RSC) from 1967. Outstanding among his many stage appearances for the RSC, both at Stratford-upon-Avon and in London's West End (usually at the Aldwych Theatre), was his performance in 1963 as the Duke of York in The Wars of the Roses opposite Peggy Ashcroft as Queen Margaret.

Other performances by Sinden for the company were Eh? by Henry Livings in 1964, as Lord Foppington in The Relapse in 1967, Malvolio in Twelfth Night (opposite Judi Dench as Viola) in 1969 and again with Dench and her husband Michael Williams in 1972, as Sir Harcourt Courtly in London Assurance (New Theatre).

After the production transferred to New York in 1975, Sinden became the first recipient of the newly established Broadway Drama Desk Special Award. Sinden sought and received advice about the character's costume and mannerisms in the role from the Regency novelist Georgette Heyer.

For the 1976 Stratford season and then at the Aldwych Theatre in 1977, Sinden won the Evening Standard Award as Best Actor for his performance in the title role of King Lear (with Michael Williams as the Fool). Meanwhile, he was also portraying in repertory, Benedick (regarded as "the most admired Benedick in living memory") opposite Judi Dench's Beatrice in John Barton's highly acclaimed 'British Raj' revival of Much Ado About Nothing. At the same time he was also rehearsing the third season of the LWT sitcom Two's Company with Elaine Stritch during the daytime and filming the show at the studio in front of a live audience on Sunday evenings. He claimed "RSC money isn't very good compared with a normal commercial theatre rate. I was on their 'star' salary, which meant it worked out at about £47 per performance! You work for them 'for the honour' of doing the greatest classical plays, not for the money, so you have to make up the financial short-fall somewhere".

In 1979, he played the title role in Othello, directed by Ronald Eyre, becoming the last 'blacked-up white' actor to play the role for the RSC. (Note: Ben Kingsley emphasised that his Anglo-Indian parentage demonstrated authentic casting when he took the role in the company's 1985 production.) Everyman editor and critic Gareth Lloyd Evans observed that his interpretation was "not...about colour or racialism" but one that illuminated the character's personal tragedy.

=== Great West End Theatres series ===
In 2013, Sinden presented a documentary series, Great West End Theatres, detailing the history and stories associated with each of ten London theatres. Directed and produced by his son Marc, it was intended as a 40-part DVD and Sky Arts TV series, with only the first ten episodes completed. It was shown on Sky Arts 2 in 2013.

In their review of the series, the British Theatre Guide said "Sir Donald's gorgeous plummy tones are a joy to listen to whatever he is saying but when he is extolling the virtues of one of his own favourite theatres, the pleasure is heightened. At his first entrance, he announces that he is "tingling with excitement" which is just what one wants from a tour guide. Soon enough, so are viewers."

The Daily Telegraph's review states: "Great West End Theatres is a lovely documentary series, made by the director Marc Sinden. Its star, and—it transpires—the best documentary frontman of all time, is his actor-father: Sir Donald Sinden, 90 years old next month. Sir Donald has been let loose and the effect is enchanting beyond belief. It is also, at times, incredibly funny. One has the sense of a lifetime spent in this world, being poured out for our delight like glasses of vintage champagne."

== Television ==
Sinden appeared in ITV's 1960 adaptation of The Mystery of Edwin Drood, starring as John Jasper. No audio or video recordings of the production are known to have survived. In 1963, he appeared in the Associated Rediffusion series Our Man at St. Mark's. His other television roles included The Colonel in an episode of The Prisoner ("Many Happy Returns", 1967).

After starring in the series The Organisation (1971), he co-starred in the London Weekend Television situation comedy Two's Company which debuted in 1975. Sinden was cast in the role of an English butler, Robert, to Elaine Stritch's American character, Dorothy. Much of the humour derived from the culture clashes between Robert's very stiff-upper-lip Britishness and Dorothy's devil-may-care New York view on life. Two's Company was well received in Britain and ran for four seasons until 1979. The programme was nominated for a 'Best Situation Comedy' BAFTA in 1977. Stritch and Sinden also sang the theme tune for the opening credits to the programme, which received a BAFTA nomination. They each received a BAFTA nomination in 1979 for 'Best Light Entertainment Performance' and the show received two additional BAFTA nominations that year.

In 1978, Sinden was the leading guest star in the first "special" of Thames Television's The Morecambe & Wise Show, in which he carried on the butler's role.

In 1979, Sinden presented a documentary series on BBC2 (later repeated in 1981 on BBC1), Discovering English Churches inspired by his grandfather's architectural drawings and watercolours. Over ten episodes, Sinden explored the unique history of the English church, and the influences that shaped the development of 16,000 churches, showing the history of two or three churches in each episode.

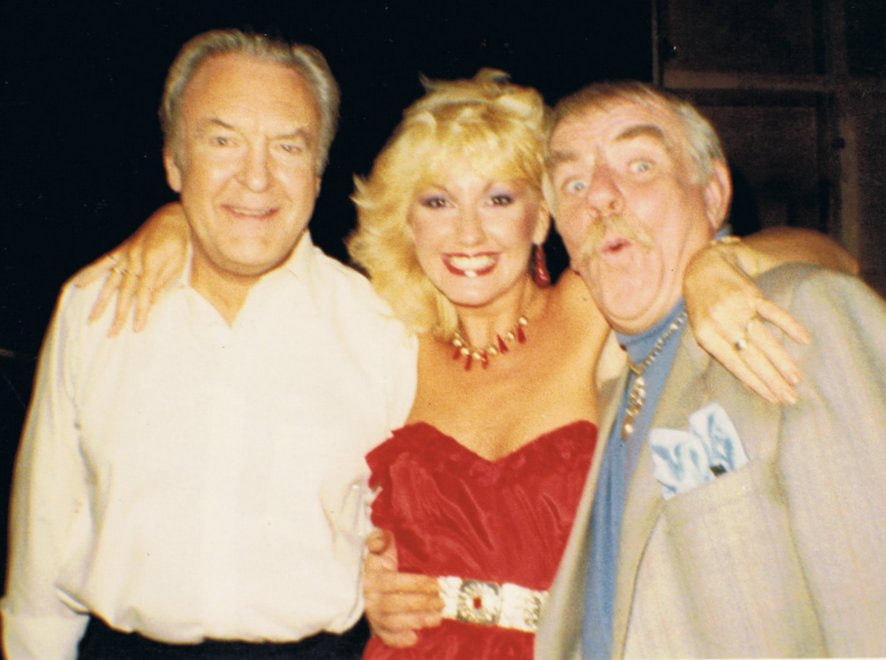
Sinden (left) during filming of Never the Twain, with Windsor Davies in the 1980s

From 1981, Sinden starred in the Thames Television situation comedy, Never the Twain. He played snooty antiques dealer Simon Peel who lived next door to a competitor, Oliver Smallbridge (played by Windsor Davies). The characters hated each other and were horrified when they discovered that their son and daughter were to be married—thus meaning they were related. The series was a TV ratings success and ran for 11 series until 1991.

He was the subject of an extended edition of This Is Your Life in 1985 when he was surprised by Eamonn Andrews while filming on location in Surrey.

Sinden was regularly spoofed on Spitting Image, the 1980s British satirical television programme in which famous people were lampooned by caricatured latex puppets. Much of the Spitting Image humour was centred around Sinden being a "ham" actor, forever overacting and behaving in an overly theatrical way. For example, when his puppet, sitting in a restaurant, summons a waiter and asks "Do you serve a ham salad?" the waiter replies "Yes, we serve salad to anyone".

From 2001 to 2007, he played the part of senior judge (and father-in-law of the title character), Sir Joseph Channing in Judge John Deed and was the voice of Totally Viral. In 2008, he played Colonel Henry Hammond in the Midsomer Murders episode "Shot at Dawn." In 2010 he played Sir Henry Clithering in the Agatha Christie's Marple episode "The Blue Geranium".

== Hollywood ==
He starred in the Walt Disney Productions family film The Island at the Top of the World (1974), playing Sir Anthony Ross, which was filmed at Disney's studios in Burbank, California.

== Radio ==
Sinden's distinctive voice was heard frequently on radio, including as Sir Charles Baskerville in a BBC Radio 4 adaptation of the Sherlock Holmes story The Hound of the Baskervilles. He starred in multiple adaptations of John Dickson Carr's Dr. Gideon Fell mysteries, including The House on Gallows Lane, The Hollow Man and Black Spectacles, To Wake the Dead, The Blind Barber and The Mad Hatter Mystery.

== Books ==
Sinden wrote two autobiographical volumes: A Touch of the Memoirs (1982) and Laughter in the Second Act (1985), edited the Everyman Book of Theatrical Anecdotes (1987), wrote a book to coincide with his BBC TV series The English Country Church (1988) and a collection of "epitaphs and final utterances" titled The Last Word (1994).

== Recognition and honours ==
Sinden was appointed Commander of the Order of the British Empire (CBE) in 1979 and knighted in 1997. He became a Fellow of the Royal Society of Arts (FRSA) in 1966 and received the Freedom of the City of London in 1997.

On 12 July 2005, he was awarded an honorary degree of Doctor of Letters by the University of Leicester and, on 20 July 2011, an honorary Doctor of Arts degree from the University of Kent.

In reply to a question from an audience member during a performance at the Yvonne Arnaud Theatre of An Evening with... Sir Donald Sinden, he said he had worked out that, apart from "gaps before the next job started", he had only had a total of five weeks' unemployment between 1942 and 2008.

In 2004, the purpose-built theatre located in the grounds of Homewood School at Tenterden in Kent was named the Sinden Theatre.

Sinden was honorary president of the Garden Suburb Theatre, an amateur theatre group based in Hampstead Garden Suburb where he was resident from 1954 until 1997.

On 9 October 2012, he celebrated his 89th birthday and his retirement after 30 years as the longest-standing president of the Royal Theatrical Fund (founded by Charles Dickens in 1839) with a celebratory lunch for 350 guests at the Park Lane Hotel, London; this was compered by Russ Abbot, and the subsequent charity auction was conducted by Lord Archer of Weston-super-Mare. Leading the tributes was Jean Kent, who had co-starred with Sinden in Bernard Delfont's 1951 stage production of Froufrou; letters from Queen Elizabeth II and Prince Albert of Monaco were read out, and speeches made by Gyles Brandreth, Ray Cooney and Julian Fellowes.

Sinden received, posthumously, the Gielgud Award for Excellence in the Dramatic Arts at the Guildhall, London, during the 2014 Theatre Awards UK ceremony, held on 19 October. The award was collected on his behalf by his son, Marc Sinden.

== Personal life ==
Sinden was married to the actress Diana Mahony from 3 May 1948 until her death from stomach cancer aged 77 on 22 October 2004. The couple had two sons: actor Jeremy Sinden (1950–1996), who died of lung cancer, and actor and filmmaker Marc Sinden (born 1954). Sinden had four grandchildren and one great-granddaughter.

Sinden was colour blind and suffered from asthma, which prevented him from joining the armed forces during the Second World War and suffered from negative buoyancy, meaning that he was unable to float or swim in water, which was discovered while filming The Cruel Sea when the ship was sinking. Co-star Jack Hawkins saved him from drowning in the open-air water tank at Denham Studios.

According to his second autobiography, while investigating his family genealogy he discovered that the only previous relatives who were also members of the theatrical profession were the Victorian brother and sister act of Bert and Topsy Sinden, who were distant cousins. Topsy achieved "some fame as a 'skirt dancer' and première danseuse at the Empire Theatre of Varieties in Leicester Square."

== Death and memorials ==
Sinden died at his home in Wittersham on the Isle of Oxney, Kent, on 12 September 2014, less than a month shy of his 91st birthday, from prostate cancer diagnosed several years earlier. Speaking at his funeral, held on 19 September at St John the Baptist Church, Wittersham, were his grandson Hal Sinden, Dame Judi Dench and Sir Patrick Stewart. The eulogy was read by Lord Archer of Weston-super-Mare. An honorary life member and trustee of the Garrick Club in London, which he joined in 1960, Sinden was cremated in a coffin painted in the club's 'salmon and cucumber' colours.

The lights on the marquees of the West End's theatres were dimmed in his honour, in the traditional mark of respect to theatre's most notable contributors, on 12 September 2014.

It was announced that his estate on his death was valued at £2.3 million.

A blue plaque in his memory was attached to his former family home in Hampstead Garden Suburb in 2015 and another to his country home in Wittersham, Isle of Oxney, Kent, in 2021.

== Filmography ==
=== Film ===
Year	Title	Role	Notes
1948	Portrait from Life	Minor Role	
1953	The Cruel Sea	Lockhart	
1953	Mogambo	Donald Nordley	
1953	A Day to Remember	Jim Carver	
1954	You Know What Sailors Are	Lt. Sylvester Green	
1954	Doctor in the House	Tony Benskin	
1954	The Beachcomber	Ewart Gray	
1954	Mad About Men	Jeff Saunders	
1955	Simba	Inspector Drummond	
1955	Above Us the Waves	Lt Tom Corbett	
1955	Josephine and Men	Alan Hartley	
1955	An Alligator Named Daisy	Peter Weston	
1956	The Black Tent	Col Sir Charles Holland	
1956	Eyewitness	Wade	
1956	Tiger in the Smoke	Geoffrey Leavitt	
1957	Doctor at Large	Dr Tony Benskin	
1957	Rockets Galore!	Hugh Mander	
1959	The Captain's Table	Shawe-Wilson	
1959	Operation Bullshine	Lt. Gordon Brown	
1960	Your Money or Your Wife	Pelham Butterworth	
1960	The Siege of Sidney Street	Mannering	
1962	Twice Round the Daffodils	Ian Richards	
1962	Mix Me a Person	Philip Bellamy, QC	
1968	Decline and Fall... of a Birdwatcher	The Prison Governor	
1971	Villain	Gerald Draycott	
1972	Rentadick	Jeffrey Armitage	
1973	The National Health	Mr Carr / Senior Surgeon Boyd	
1973	Father Dear Father	Philip Glover	
1973	The Day of the Jackal	Assistant Commissioner Mallinson	
1974	The Island at the Top of the World	Sir Anthony Ross	
1975	That Lucky Touch	British Gen. Armstrong	
1990	The Children	Lord Wrench	
1995	Balto	Doc	Voice
2003	The Accidental Detective	Professor Stein	Credited as Sir Donald Sinden
2012	Run for Your Wife	Man on bus	(final film role)

=== Television ===
Title	Year	Role	Notes
The Mystery of Edwin Drood	1960	John Jasper	TV serial (lost)
Our Man at St. Mark's	1963–66	Rev. Stephen Young	TV series (Rediffusion) Mostly lost
The Prisoner	1967	The Colonel	TV series (Ep 7 "Many Happy Returns")
Father, Dear Father	1969–72	Philip Glover	TV series, 3 episodes (Thames Television)
The Organization	1972	David Pulman	TV series (Yorkshire Television)
Two's Company	1975–79	Robert	TV series (LWT)
The Morecambe & Wise Show	1978	Host of "Butler of the Year"	TV series, Ep 1 (Thames Television)
Never the Twain	1981–91	Simon Peel	TV series (Thames Television)
The Canterville Ghost	1996	Mr Umney	TV movie
Richard II	1997	Duke of York	TV movie
Alice in Wonderland	1999	Voice of the Gryphon	TV movie, voice
Judge John Deed	2001–07	Sir Joseph Channing	TV drama recurring character
Midsomer Murders	2008	Colonel Henry Hammond	TV series, episode "Shot at Dawn"
Agatha Christie's Marple	2010	Sir Henry Clithering	TV series, episode "The Blue Geranium"
Great West End Theatres	2013	Himself	TV series, all ten episodes

== Awards ==
Year	Award	Work	Result
1975	Drama Desk Award for Outstanding Actor in a Play	London Assurance	Nominated
1976	Tony Award for Best Actor in a Play	Habeas Corpus	Nominated
1977	Olivier Award for Best Actor in a Revival (Society of West End Theatre Awards until 1983)	King Lear	Nominated
1977	Evening Standard Award for Best Actor	King Lear	Won
1978	Olivier Award for Best Comedy Performance	Shut Your Eyes and Think of England	Nominated
1979	BAFTA TV Award for Best Light Entertainment Performance	Two's Company	Nominated
1981	Olivier Award for Best Comedy Performance	Present Laughter	Nominated
1982	Olivier Award for Best Actor in a Revival	Uncle Vanya	Nominated
Special awards
1975	Drama Desk Special Mention	London Assurance	Recipient
2014	Gielgud Award for Excellence in the Dramatic Arts	Lifetime achievement	Recipient

== Publications ==
- A Touch of the Memoirs (1982) ISBN 0340262354
- Laughter in the Second Act (1985) ISBN 0340285400
- Everyman Book of Theatrical Anecdotes (1987) ISBN 0460046926
- The English Country Church (1988) ISBN 0283995041
- The Last Word (1994) ISBN 0860518922
