= Prudence Fitzgerald =

English television director and producer

- Born: 18 January 1930; Stafford, Staffordshire, England
- Died: 6 September 2018 (aged 88); Cross in Hand, Heathfield, East Sussex, England
- Occupations: Television Producer and Director
- Years active: 1961–1984
- Spouse: Marius Goring (m. 1977; died 1998)

Prudence Mary Fitzgerald (18 January 1930 – 6 September 2018) was an English television director and producer. She was known for directing and producing numerous British TV series including Dr. Finlay's Casebook, The Expert, The Shadow of the Tower, 1990 and the 1979 series A Family Affair. She was also a programme co-ordinator for the 1974 BBC TV mini-series Fall of Eagles.

== Life and career ==
Prudence Fitzgerald was born in Stafford in 1930 to Kevin Columba Fitzgerald, a chemical company advisor and Vida Lamb. She started working in television in the early 1960s, beginning her directing career at the BBC in 1961. She worked on several TV movies and series there before making her name as a director of the hugely popular Dr. Finlay's Casebook in 1965-1966. She was the most prolific director on the BBC series, The Expert, helming eighteen of the sixty-two episodes. It starred Marius Goring as the title character, Professor John Hardy. It was the first series to feature a forensic pathologist in the lead role as an investigator, working with police. It had an influence on such later shows as Quincy, M.E. and CSI: Crime Scene Investigation. Several of the series on which she worked, including The Expert and The Brothers, were created by the prolific producing duo Gerard Glaister and N.J. Crisp.

Fitzgerald met her future husband Marius Goring when she chose him from his photo in a casting directory for a part on The Expert. Goring's second wife, the German actress Lucie Mannheim, died in 1976. Marius Goring and Prudence Fitzgerald married on 21 May 1977. They shared a seventeenth-century house in London's Hampton Court that looked out onto a royal park, before moving to the village of Rushlake Green in East Sussex, where they lived for the rest of their lives. Marius Goring died of cancer in 1998 and Prudence survived him by twenty years, dying on 6 September 2018. They are buried together in the churchyard of St Mary the Virgin, Warbleton, East Sussex.

== Filmography ==
- The Big Boys (1961) TV movie – producer
- Studio 4 (1962) TV series – producer/director of 3 episodes
- Crying Down the Lane (1962) TV mini-series – producer/director of 6 episodes
- Moonstrike (1963) TV series - director of 2 episodes
- Festival (1963–64) TV series – director of 2 episodes
- First Night (1964) TV series – director of 1 episode
- Detective (1964) TV series – director of 1 episode
- Dr. Finlay's Casebook (1965–66) TV series - director of 14 episodes
- This Man Craig (1966–67) TV series – director of 7 episodes
- Champion House (1967) TV series – director of 3 episodes
- The Revenue Men (1967–68) TV series – director of 6 episodes
- The Expert (1968–1976) TV series – director of 18 episodes
- Paul Temple (1970) TV series - director of 1 episode
- The View from Daniel Pike (1971) TV series – director of 2 episodes
- The Shadow of the Tower (1972) TV series – director of 4 episodes
- The Brothers (1972) TV series – director of 2 episodes
- Crown Court (1974) TV series – director of 2 episodes
- Fall of Eagles (1974) TV mini-series – programme co-ordinator of 3 episodes
- 1990 (1977–78) TV series – producer of 16 episodes
- A Family Affair (1979) TV series - producer of 10 episodes/director of 1 episode
- Juno and the Paycock (1980) TV movie – producer
- Out of Order (1984) TV movie – producer
