= Virginia Stride =

British actress (born 1935)

- Born: Virginia Thomas; 1936 (age 89–90); Yokohama, Japan
- Education: Royal Academy of Dramatic Art
- Occupation: Actress
- Spouse: John Stride (m. 1958, divorced)

Virginia Thomas (born 1936), professionally known as Virginia Stride, is a British actress on stage and screen who first came to public attention on television in the 1960s.

She was the first wife of the actor John Stride (1936–2018), whom she met when they were studying at the Royal Academy of Dramatic Art (RADA), and in 1964 she introduced the first programme to be seen on BBC Two.

== Early years ==
Virginia Stride was born in Yokohama, Japan. She was, in her own words, a "fat little girl" and, although she became slimmer in her teens, her self-consciousness about this in childhood had made her sceptical of an acting career. In the event, she went to RADA rather than read English at university, and took her husband's name for professional purposes because of pressure from agents who felt that Virginia Thomas "didn't sound quite right".

== Career ==
Virginia Stride played the recurring role of control room radio operator Katy Hoskins in Z-Cars (1962–64), the long-running BBC television series about the police in a fictional town near Liverpool. In 1964 she appeared in an episode of The Avengers as Alice Brisket, secretary to Quilpie (played by Ronald Radd), who was the controller of John Steed (Patrick Macnee) and Cathy Gale (Honor Blackman).

Stride was the first presenter, on 21 April 1964, of Play School, a daily programme for young children on BBC 2. Because a power failure coincided with the channel's scheduled opening the previous evening, Play School was the first programme to be transmitted on BBC 2. In 1966 Stride appeared in the BBC comedy series On the Margin, a collection of sketches and songs written by Alan Bennett, who, together with John Sergeant (later the BBC's political correspondent), also starred in the show. The six episodes of On the Margin were twice repeated in 1967 but were among many programmes "wiped" by the BBC in the 1970s. A compact disc of surviving audio extracts was released by the BBC in 2009.

Virginia Stride's best-known role was probably as the "seductive" Liz Champion in Champion House, a weekly drama series created for the BBC by Hazel Adair and Peter Ling, which concerned a family-run textile business in Yorkshire. Liz Champion was a member of the company's board. She was the daughter of Jack Champion, whose father, Joe (played by Edward Chapman), had made the company over to him, only to see it pass, after Jack's early death, to Liz's eldest brother Stephen (James Kerry), who had his own less compliant ideas of the firm's direction.

The first episode of Champion House was shown on 28 May 1967 and there was a second series in 1968. Its initial profile was assisted by live coverage on 28 May of the return of Sir Francis Chichester from his solo circumnavigation of the world.

== Other roles ==
Virginia Stride appeared in episodes of a number of other television series, including Out of the World (1962), Public Eye (1966), The Baron (1966, as an hotelier who has an implied "one-night stand" with John Mannering, the "Baron", played by Steve Forrest), The Mind of Mr. J.G. Reeder (as Margaret Bellman in the first series, in 1969, a role that Gillian Lewis played in the second series in 1971), Callan (1972), The Expert (1976), Target (1978) and A Touch of Spice (1989). Her films include I Want What I Want (1972), based on Geoff Brown's novel of 1966 about transsexualism.

In the early 21st century Stride performed with the Agatha Christie Theatre Company, for example on tour in The Unexpected Guest (with, among others, Simon MacCorkindale and former singer Mark Wynter) in 2006.
