= Marius Goring =

British actor (1912–1998)

Marius Goring CBE FRSL
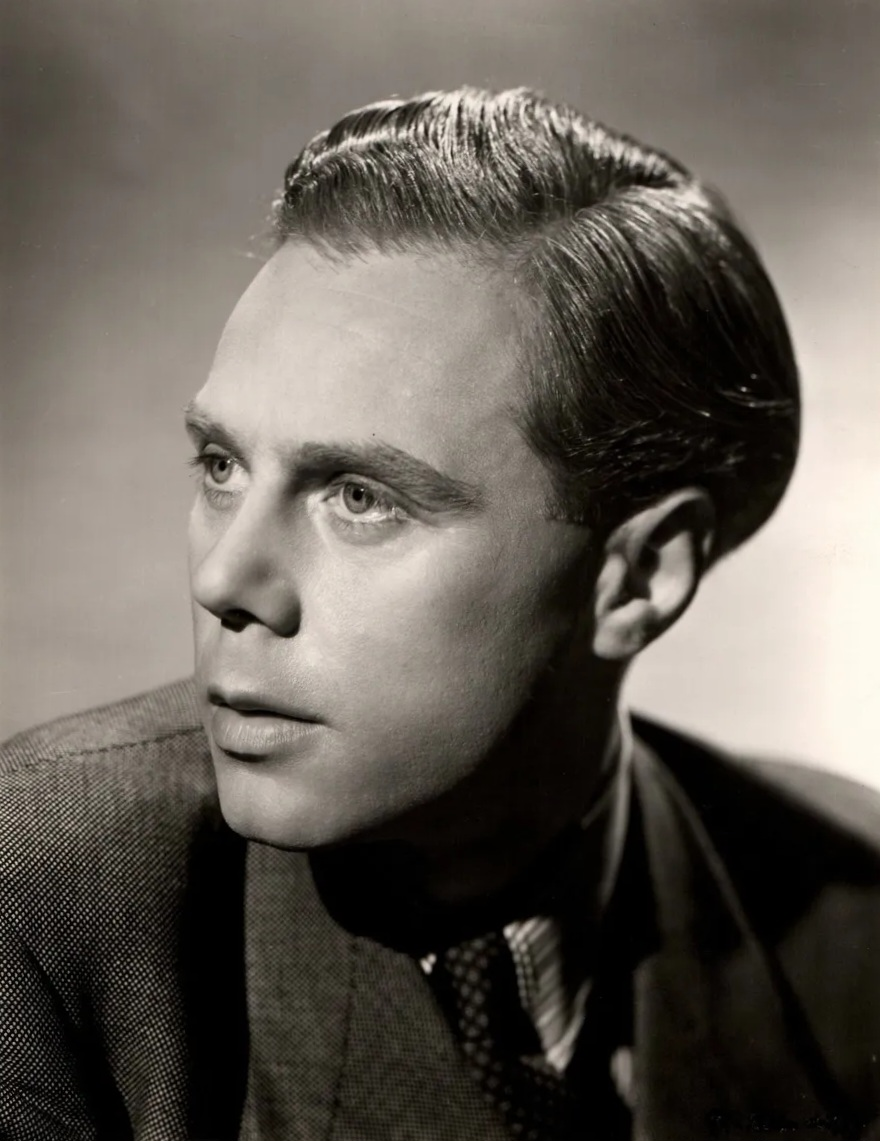
- Goring c. 1940
- Born: Marius Re Goring; 23 May 1912; Newport, Isle of Wight, England
- Died: 30 September 1998 (aged 86); Rushlake Green, Heathfield, East Sussex, England
- Occupation: Actor
- Years active: 1926–1990
- Spouses: Mary Westwood Steel (m. 1931; div. 1941) Lucie Mannheim (m. 1941; died 1976) Prudence Fitzgerald (m. 1977)
- Children: 1
- Relatives: Charles Buckman Goring (father)

Marius Re Goring CBE FRSL (23 May 1912 – 30 September 1998) was an English stage and screen actor. He often portrayed urbane and morally grey characters, and is best remembered for the four films he made with Powell & Pressburger, particularly as Conductor 71 in A Matter of Life and Death and as Julian Craster in The Red Shoes. He is also known for playing the titular role in the long-running TV drama series, The Expert.

== Early life ==
Goring was born on 23 May 1912 in Newport, Isle of Wight. He was the son of the eminent physician and researcher Charles Buckman Goring (1870–1919), the author of The English Convict, and Kate Winifred (née Macdonald, 1874–1964), a professional pianist of Scottish descent who was also a suffragette. He had an older brother, Donald, who died in Yemen, in 1936, from injuries sustained in a motor vehicle accident.

After attending The Perse School in Cambridge, where he became a friend of an older boy, the future documentary film maker Humphrey Jennings, Goring studied modern languages at the University of Frankfurt am Main, the Ludwig-Maximilians-Universität München, the University of Vienna, and the University of Paris.

== Career ==
Encouraged by both of his parents to pursue his acting ambitions, he made his professional debut in 1927 playing Harlequin. He studied under Harcourt Williams at the Old Vic dramatic school from 1929 to 1932. In 1931, he toured Germany and France with the English Classical Players performing in Shakespearean and classic English plays. Having become fluent in French and German, he joined La Compagnie des Quinze, under the directorship of Michel Saint-Denis, in 1934. He would later encourage Saint-Denis to come to England and work as a director. His early stage career in England included appearances at the Old Vic, Sadler's Wells and in the West End from 1932 through to 1940. During that period, he played a variety of Shakespearean roles at the Old Vic, including the title role in Macbeth and Romeo in Romeo and Juliet (1933), Feste in Twelfth Night (1937), in addition to Trip in Sheridan's The School for Scandal. He first worked in the West End in a 1934 revival of Granville-Barker's The Voysey Inheritance at the Shaftesbury Theatre.

In 1929, he became a founding member of British Equity, the actors' union, served on its council from 1949 and was three times its vice-president from 1963 to 1965, 1975 to 1977 and again from 1980 to 1982. Goring's relationship with his union was fraught with conflict: he took it to litigation on three occasions. In 1978, regarding the issue of the supremacy of a referendum to decide Equity rules, he took it as far as the House of Lords and won his case. In 1992, he unsuccessfully sought to end the restriction on the sale of radio and television programmes to apartheid South Africa. Stressing that he opposed apartheid and would not perform for segregated audiences, he argued that the ban was depriving actors of work, and stated that he wished to stage a production of the play She Stoops to Conquer with an all-black cast. This particular litigation nearly bankrupted him, due to heavy court costs.

In November 1931, at the age of nineteen, he married twenty-nine year old Mary Westwood Steel (1902-1994) at Gretna Green, Scotland (they had a second marriage ceremony in a London register office in February 1932) and their only child, a daughter Phyllida Mariette Goring, was born in March 1932 and died in 2018. The marriage did not succeed and he became engaged in 1935 to ballet choreographer and designer, Susan 'Susy' Salaman, older sister of Merula Salaman, wife of Alec Guinness. Susy contracted acute encephalitis in late 1935 and was left brain-damaged. Goring wanted to go ahead with the wedding but Susy's father, Michel Salaman, would not allow it.

In 1935, he co-founded the London Theatre Studio with Michel Saint-Denis, George Devine and Glen Byam Shaw. It trained actors, directors and designers and was a precursor of the Old Vic Theatre School; Goring taught Shakespeare there. It had to close in late 1939 due to the outbreak of war.

Goring's film career began with an uncredited role in The Amateur Gentleman (1936) with Douglas Fairbanks Jr and a small speaking role in Rembrandt (also 1936). He shared his one scene in this film with the star Charles Laughton, with whom he had previously worked on stage at the Old Vic. He made two further films released in 1939: Flying Fifty-Five with Derrick de Marney where he showed off his comedic skills playing an amusing drunkard and co-starred with Conrad Veidt in his first Powell and Pressburger film, The Spy in Black, an intriguing spy thriller set during World War One, where he played a German officer for the first of many times in his film career.

When war was declared in September 1939, he was back in the West End as Pip in a production of Great Expectations, adapted for the stage by Alec Guinness. Along with all other plays, it was closed down temporarily by the war but was the first to resume when theatres were reopened in early 1940. He joined the British Army in June 1940, and was seconded in 1941 to the BBC as supervisor of radio productions broadcasting to Germany as part of the BBC German Service (Londoner Rundfunk). He made broadcasts under the name Charles Richardson (using his father's first name and maternal grandmother's maiden name), because of the association of his name with Hermann Göring. In 1944 he became a member of the intelligence staff of SHAEF (Supreme Headquarters Allied Expeditionary Force) where he attained the rank of colonel. Because of the broadcasts he had been making to Germany, set up by the Foreign Office as a counter to William Joyce (Lord Haw-Haw), he was put on a Nazi hit-list.

In 1941, he married his second wife, the German actress Lucie Mannheim (1899-1976). Mannheim, who was Jewish, had been a principal actress in the Berlin Theatre but had to leave Germany when the Nazis came to power. She worked with Goring in many stage productions from the 1930s onwards and in seven episodes of The Adventures of the Scarlet Pimpernel, one of which he wrote especially for her, as well as in several films. Mannheim died in 1976, and the next year Goring married television director/producer Prudence Fitzgerald (1930-2018), who had directed him in many episodes of The Expert.

In the film A Matter of Life and Death (1946) Goring played Conductor 71, whose role is to 'conduct' Peter Carter (David Niven) to the afterlife. In The Red Shoes, he played Julian Craster, a young composer who wins the heart of ballerina Vicky Page (Moira Shearer) and clashes with the imperious ballet impresario, Boris Lermontov (Anton Walbrook). In the film Odette released in the UK in 1950, Goring played the role of Colonel Henri, a German Abwehr (Military Intelligence) officer who deceived and captured Odette. The film is based on the true story of Odette Sansom, the first living woman to be awarded the George Cross. The real Odette Sansom was later a witness at his marriage to Prudence Fitzgerald in 1977. He played Colonel Günther von Hohensee in So Little Time (1952), which also featured Maria Schell, one of his rare romantic leads and frequent roles playing a German officer. He considered the film one of his favourites, alongside the four films he made with Powell and Pressburger.

His TV work included starring as Sir Percy Blakeney in The Adventures of the Scarlet Pimpernel (ITV, 1955) (a role which he also performed in a 1952-53 radio show), a series which he also co-wrote and produced; Theodore Maxtible in the Doctor Who story The Evil of the Daleks (BBC, 1967); Professor John Hardy in The Expert (BBC, 1968–1976); Paul von Hindenburg in Fall of Eagles (BBC, 1974); King George V in Edward & Mrs. Simpson (Thames, 1980) and Emile Englander in The Old Men at the Zoo (BBC, 1983).

Goring's voice provides the narration of the sound and light show performed regularly in the evening at the Blue Mosque in Istanbul, Turkey.

== Honours ==
He was made a Fellow of the Royal Society of Literature in 1979 and appointed Commander of the Order of the British Empire (CBE) in 1991.

== Personal life ==
Goring was married three times, to Mary Westwood Steel, Lucie Mannheim, and Prudence Fitzgerald. He had a daughter, Phyllida, with his first wife.

As an adult, Goring regularly performed French and German roles, and was frequently cast in the latter because of his name, coupled with his red-gold hair and blue eyes, fluency in both languages, and a marriage to German actress Lucie Mannheim. However, he did not possess any known German ancestry. In a 1965 interview, he explained that he was not of German descent, stating that "Goring is a completely English name." As BFI Screenonline noted, "Goring, in nearly 50 films, maintained an urbane image - when, that is, he wasn't being notably sinister. Wholly British as he was, he was remarkably adept at suggesting foreigners."

=== Death ===
He died from stomach cancer in 1998 aged 86 at his home in Rushlake Green, East Sussex. He is buried in the churchyard of St Mary the Virgin, Warbleton, East Sussex near Rushlake Green with his wife, Prudence, who died in 2018.

== Portrayal in fiction ==
Goring appears as a character in the 2023 BBC radio play, A Wireless War, in which he is recruited by the Radio Drama Company to voice Adolf Hitler in a serial about the rise of Nazi Germany. He is played by Josh Bryant-Jones.

== Filmography ==
=== Film ===
Year	Title	Role	Notes
1936	The Amateur Gentleman	Minor Role	Uncredited
1936	Rembrandt	Baron Leivens	Uncredited
1938	Dead Men Tell No Tales	Greening	
1939	Flying Fifty-Five	Charles Barrington	
1939	The Spy in Black	Lt. Felix Schuster	
1940	Pastor Hall	Fritz Gerte	
1940	The Case of the Frightened Lady	Lord Lebanon	
1942	The Big Blockade	German Propaganda Officer	
1943	The Night Invader	Oberleutnant	
1946	Night Boat to Dublin	Frederick Jannings	
1946	A Matter of Life and Death	Conductor 71	
1947	Take My Life	Sidney Fleming	
1948	The Red Shoes	Julian Craster	
1948	Mr. Perrin and Mr. Traill	Vincent Perrin	
1950	Odette	Colonel Henri	
1950	Highly Dangerous	Commandant Anton Razinski	
1951	Pandora and the Flying Dutchman	Reggie Demarest	
1951	Circle of Danger	Sholto Lewis	
1951	The Magic Box	House Agent	
1952	Nights on the Road	Kurt Willbrandt	
1952	So Little Time	Colonel Günther von Hohensee	
1952	The Man Who Watched Trains Go By	Inspector Lucas	
1953	Rough Shoot	Hiart	
1954	The Barefoot Contessa	Alberto Bravano	
1955	Break in the Circle	Baron Keller	
1955	The Adventures of Quentin Durward	Count Philip de Creville	
1957	Ill Met by Moonlight	Major General Kreipe	
1957	The Truth About Women	Otto Kerstein	
1958	Rx Murder	Doctor Henry Dysert	
1958	The Moonraker	Colonel Beaumont	
1958	I Was Monty's Double	Karl Nielson	
1958	The Son of Robin Hood	Chester	
1959	The Angry Hills	Col. Elrick Oberg	
1959	Whirlpool	Georg	
1959	The Treasure of San Teresa	Rudi Siebert	
1959	Desert Mice	German Major	
1960	Beyond the Curtain	Von Storch	
1961	The Unstoppable Man	Inspector Hazelrigg	
1961	The Devil's Daffodil	Oliver Milburgh	
1962	The Inspector	Thorens	
1962	The Devil's Agent	Gen. Greenhahn	
1965	The Crooked Road	Harlequin	
1965	Up from the Beach	German Commandant	
1967	The 25th Hour	Col. Muller	
1968	The Girl on a Motorcycle	Rebecca's Father	
1968	Subterfuge	Shevik	
1970	First Love	Dr. Lushin	
1971	Zeppelin	Prof. Altschul	
1978	La petite fille en velours bleu	Raimondo Casarès	
1990	Strike It Rich	Blixon	

=== Television ===
Year	Title	Role	Notes
1949	Box for One	The Caller	Play
1950–59	BBC Sunday Night Theatre	Various	9 episodes
1954	You Are There	Oliver Cromwell	Episode: "The Trial of Charles the First"
1954	Douglas Fairbanks Presents	Nicol Pascal	Episode: "The Rehearsal"
1955-1956	Lilli Palmer Theatre	Reinhardt/Major Edward Carter	2 episodes
1955-1956	The Adventures of the Scarlet Pimpernel	Sir Percy Blakeney/The Scarlet Pimpernel	
1957-1967	ITV Play of the Week	Various	5 episodes
1960	International Detective	Ferdie Steibel	Episode: "The Steibel Case"
1960-1962	BBC Sunday-Night Play	Various	4 episodes
1961-1962	Drama 61-67	Captain/Mervyn	2 episodes
1963	24-Hour Call	Sam Bullivant	Episode: "Love for Caroline"
1963	First Night	Grieve Wishart	Episode: "The Youngest Profession"
1963	Maigret	Peter the Lett	Episode: "Peter the Lett"
1964	The Third Man	Colonel Dimonella	Episode: "A Question in Ice"
1964	Love Story	Robert Langley	Episode: "In Loving Memory"
1964	The Great War	Various voices	26 episodes
1965	The Mask of Janus	Dr. Kapaka	Episode: "Why Not Call Me Kruschev?
1965-1970	Thirty-Minute Theatre	Mr. Ponge/The Interrogator	2 episodes
1966	Thirteen Against Fate	Monsieur Hire	Episode: "The Hire"
1966	Out of the Unknown	Wattari	Episode: "Too Many Crooks"
1966-1967	The Wednesday Play	Reverend Harrup/Sir Hubert	2 episodes
1967	The Revenue Men	Kersten	Episode: "The Traders"
1967	Doctor Who	Theodore Maxtible	Serial: "The Evil of the Daleks"
1968	Man in a Suitcase	Henri Thibaud	Episode: "Blind Spot"
1968–76	The Expert	Professor John Hardy	
1974	Fall of Eagles	Von Hindenburg	2 episodes
1978	Wilde Alliance	Rex	Episode: "Things That Go Bump"
1978	Holocaust	Heinrich Palitz	Part One
1979	Edward & Mrs. Simpson	King George V	2 episodes
1979	Tales of the Unexpected	Dr. John Landy	Episode: "William and Mary"
1980	Hammer House of Horror	Heinz	Episode: "Charlie Boy"
1981	Levkas Man	Dr Pieter Gerrard	6 episodes
1982	BBC Television Shakespeare	Sicilius Leonatus	Episode: Cymbeline
1982	The Year of the French	Lord Glenthorne	Episode One
1984	Hammer House of Mystery and Suspense	Angus Aragon	Episode: "The Late Nancy Irving"
1986	Highway	Self	Episode: "Festivals"
1987	Gnostics	Self	Episode: Divinity of Man: Hermes Trismegistus & Prospero

== Stage appearances ==
Year	Title	Role	Notes
1925	Crossings: A Fairy Play	Fairy	ADC Theatre, Cambridge
1927	Jean Stirling Mackinlay Children's Matinee: Dr Doolittle's Play	Harlequin	The Rudolf Steiner Hall, London
1928	Jean Stirling Mackinlay Children's Matinee: Dr Doolittle's Play & King John's Christmas (1928)	Harlequin	The Rudolf Steiner Hall, London
1930	Les Femmes Savantes	Trissotin	ADC Theatre
1931	Macbeth, The Merchant of Venice, She Stoops to Conquer & The School for Scandal	Various	Touring Germany and France
1932	Julius Caesar	Spear Carrier	The Old Vic, London
1932	Caesar and Cleopatra	Persian	The Old Vic and Sadler's Wells Theatre, London
1932	As You Like It	Le Beau	The Old Vic, London
1932	Macbeth	Macbeth	The Old Vic and Sadler's Wells Theatre, London
1932	The Merchant of Venice	Salanio	The Old Vic, London
1933	She Stoops to Conquer	Aminadab	The Old Vic, London
1933	The Winter's Tale	Cleomenes	The Old Vic, London
1933	Cymbeline	Second Lord	The Old Vic, London
1933	The Admirable Bashville	First Policeman	The Old Vic, London
1933	Romeo and Juliet	Romeo	The Old Vic and Sadler's Wells Theatre, London
1933	The School for Scandal	Trip	The Old Vic, London
1933	Shakespeare Birthday Festival		The Old Vic, London
1933	The Tempest	Adrian	The Old Vic and Sadler's Wells Theatre, London
1933	A Midsummer Night's Dream	Faerie	With the Oxford University Dramatic Society at Headington Hill Park
1933	Twelfth Night	Sebastian	The Old Vic, London
1933	The Cherry Orchard	Yepikhodov	The Old Vic, London
1933	Henry VIII	Cardinal Campeius/Garter King of Arms	Sadler's Wells Theatre, London
1933	Measure for Measure	Friar Peter/Abhorson	The Old Vic, London
1934	The Tempest	Alonso	Sadler's Wells Theatre, London
1934	Love for Love	Buckram	The Old Vic, London
1934	Shakespeare Birthday Festival		The Old Vic, London
1934	Macbeth	Malcolm	The Old Vic, London
1934	The Voysey Inheritance	Hugh Voysey	Sadler's Wells Theatre, London and Shaftesbury Theatre, London.
1934	Hamlet		Touring in France, Belgium & The Netherlands with La Compagnie des Quinze
1934	The Rape of Lucrèce	Tarquin	Touring in France, Belgium & The Netherlands with La Compagnie des Quinze
1934	Riders to the Sea	Bartley	Touring in France, Belgium & The Netherlands with La Compagnie des Quinze
1935	Shakespeare Birthday Festival		The Old Vic, London
1935	Hamlet	Hamlet	The Old Vic, London
1935	Noah	Japeth	The New Theatre, London
1935	The Hangman	Gallows Lasse	The Duke of York's Theatre, London
1935	Sowers of the Hills	Aubert	The Westminster Theatre, London.
1935–1936	Mary Tudor	Philip of Spain	The Streatham Hill Theatre, Golders Green Hippodrome, Playhouse Theatre, London and Sadler's Wells Theatre, London
1936	Repayment	Paul Novak	The Arts Theatre, London
1936	The Happy Hypocrite	Amor	His Majesty's Theatre, London
1936	The Ante-Room	Vincent de Courcy O'Regan	The King's Theatre, Edinburgh and the Manchester Opera House
1936	Girl Unknown	Max	The New Theatre and the Golders Green Hippodrome
1936	The Wild Duck	Gregors Werle	The Westminster Theatre, London
1936	The Witch of Edmonton	Frank Thorney	The Old Vic, London
1936-1937	Hamlet	First Player and Fortinbra	The Old Vic, London
1937	Twelfth Night	Feste	The Old Vic, London
1937	Shakespeare Birthday Festival		The Old Vic, London
1937	Henry V	Chorus	The Old Vic, London
1937	Satyr	Peter de Meyer	The King's Theatre, Edinburgh and Shaftesbury Theatre, London
1937	A Woman Killed with Kindness	Producer and director	The London Theatre Studio
1937	The Last Straw	Wolfe Guldeford	The Comedy Theatre, London
1938	Surprise Item	Arthur Primmer	The Ambassadors Theatre, London
1938	Henry Irving Centenary Matinee - Scene from Louis XI		The Lyceum Theatre, London
1938	The White Guard	Leonid Shervinsky	The Phoenix Theatre, London
1939	Nora	Producer	The Duke of York's Theatre, London
1939	Lady Fanny	Lord Bantock	The Duke of York's Theatre, London
1939	Nina	Schimmelmann (also directed)	The Gaiety Theatre, Dublin and Duke of York's Theatre, London
1939	Hamlet	First Player and Osric (also co-directed with John Gielgud)	The Lyceum Theatre, London and at Kronborg, Helsingør, Denmark
1939–1940	Great Expectations	Pip	The Rudolf Steiner Hall, London.
1940	The Tempest	Prospero (also co-directed with George Devine)	The Old Vic, London
1947	Monsieur Lamberthier	Maurice	The English and German on tour in Germany (British Zone)
1948	Rosmersholm	Johannes Rosmer	The Arts Theatre, London
1948	Too True To Be Good	Aubrey Bagot	The Arts Theatre, London
1948	The Cherry Orchard	Peter Trofimov	The Arts Theatre, London
1948	Marriage	Ivan Kuzmich Podkolyosin	The Arts Theatre, London
1948	The Bear	Grigory Stepanovitch Smirnov	The Arts Theatre, London
1948-1949	The Third Man/Jealousy/Monsieur Lamberthier	Maurice	The Arts Theatre, London, Oldham Repertory Theatre Club, Manchester and on tour in Germany.
1949	Daphne Laureola	Ernest Piaste	On tour in Germany
1950	100 Thousand Talers	Mr von Kammersdorf	The Theater am Kurfürstendamm, Berlin
1951	The Madwoman of Chaillot	The Rag Picker	The St James's Theatre, London
1953	Richard III	Richard III	The Shakespeare Memorial Theatre, Stratford
1953	Antony and Cleopatra	Octavius Caesar	The Shakespeare Memorial Theatre, Stratford and the Princes Theatre, London
1953	The Taming of the Shrew	Petruchio	The Shakespeare Memorial Theatre, Stratford
1953	King Lear	The Fool	The Shakespeare Memorial Theatre, Stratford
1954	Antony and Cleopatra	Octavius Caesar	The Koninklijke Schouwburg, The Hague & Royal Theatre Carré, Amsterdam, the Netherlands, Koninklijke Nederlandse Schouwburg, Antwerp & Theatre Royal de la Monnaie, Brussels, Belgium and Théâtre des Champs-Élysées, Paris
1957	Scenes from Shakespeare		Leading a company to France at the Théâtre National Populaire, Paris and Annecy, Lyons, Lille, Amiens and Douai
1957	Scenes from Shakespeare		Leading a company to Helsinki, Finland
1958	Scenes from Shakespeare and Classical English Theatre		Leading a company to India and Ceylon
1960	Savonarola Brown	Savonarola Brown	The Royal Festival Hall, South Bank, London
1962	Measure for Measure	Angelo	The Royal Shakespeare Theatre, Stratford
1962	A Penny for a Song	Sir Timothy Bellboys	The Aldwych Theatre, London
1963	Menage à Trois	Charles	The Lyric Theatre, London
1963	King Arthur	Narrator	The Victoria and Albert Museum, London
1963–1964	The Poker Session	Teddy	The Gate Theatre, Dublin in the Dublin Theatre Festival (1963) and the Globe Theatre, London (1964)
1963	Oedipus rex	Narrator	The Royal Festival Hall, South Bank, London
1964	King Arthur	Narrator	The Royal Albert Hall, London
1965	The Apple Cart	King Magnus	The Cambridge Arts Theatre, Manchester Opera House, New Wimbledon Theatre, Theatre Royal, Brighton and Golders Green Hippodrome, London
1965	The Devil's Disciple	General Burgoyne	The Yvonne Arnaud Theatre, Guildford
1967–1968	The Bells	Mathias (also directed the Birmingham, Leeds and London productions)	The Derby Playhouse, The Alexandra, Birmingham, the Grand Theatre, Leeds and the Vaudeville Theatre, London
1968	Married Bliss	Director	The Alexandra, Birmingham and Grand Theatre, Leeds
1968	Lend Me Five Shillings	Mr Golighty (also directed)	The Vaudeville Theatre, London. Curtain raiser to The Bells
1969	The Demonstration	Professor Bright	The Nottingham Playhouse
1971–1973	Sleuth	Andrew Wyke	The St Martin's Theatre, London
1972	If Music and Sweet Poetry Agree		The Royal Shakespeare Theatre, Stratford
1974	Tribute to the Lady		The Old Vic, London
1974	The Wisest Fool	James I	The Yvonne Arnaud Theatre, Guildford, The Alexandra, Birmingham, Grand Theatre, Wolverhampton, Civic Theatre, Darlington, Ashcroft Theatre, Croydon, Richmond Theatre, London, Theatre Royal, Bath, Grand Theatre, Leeds and Hull New Theatre
1975	The Concert	Gustav Hein	The York Theatre Royal and the Forum Theatre, Billingham
1975	This Wooden O		The Bankside Globe Playhouse, London
1975	Habeas Corpus	Arthur Wicksteed	The Liverpool Playhouse
1976	The Sun King		The Tatton Park, Cheshire and Royal Festival Hall, London
1976	Sleuth	Andrew Wyke	The Liverpool Playhouse
1977	Jubilee Gaieties		The Marlowe Theatre, Canterbury, Ashcroft Theatre, Croydon, New Wimbledon Theatre, London, Devonshire Park Theatre, Eastbourne, Theatre Royal, Windsor and Wyvern Theatre, Swindon
1977	Royal Thames		The Theatre Royal Haymarket
1977	Exit: Pursued by a Bear		The Pitlochry Festival Theatre
1978	The Sun King		The Old Town Hall, Hemel Hempstead
1980	Woe to the Sparrows	Emperor Franz Josef	The Northcott Theatre, Exeter
1980	Lloyd George Knew My Father	General Sir William Boothroyd	The Theatre Royal, Norwich, Theatre Royal, Bath, King's Theatre, Glasgow, Richmond Theatre, London, Pavilion Theatre, Bournemouth, Cambridge Arts Theatre, Key Theatre, Peterborough, Theatre Royal, Brighton, Nell Gwynne Theatre, Hereford, The Alexandra, Birmingham, Sunderland Empire Theatre, Brewhouse Theatre, Taunton, Beck Theatre, Hayes and Theatr y Werin, Aberystwyth Arts Centre
1981	Habeas Corpus	Arthur Wicksteed	The Royal Lyceum Theatre, Edinburgh
1981	The Sun King		The Theatre Royal, Windsor
1982	Zaide	Narrator	The Old Vic, London
1982	The Sun King		The Fermoy Centre, King's Lynn (King's Lynn Festival)
1982	Peer Gynt	The Button Moulder	The Nottingham Playhouse
1983	The Sun King		The Queen Elizabeth Hall, South Bank, London
1983	Metamorphoses (Opera)	Ovid	The Parry Theatre, Royal College of Music, London
1984	The Dame of Sark	Colonel Count von Schmettau	The Lyceum Theatre, Crewe, Playhouse Theatre, Harlow and Key Theatre, Peterborough
1984	The Winslow Boy	Arthur Winslow	The Forum Theatre, Wythenshawe, Grand Opera House, Belfast, Theatre Royal, Norwich, Beck Theatre, Hayes, Towngate Theatre, Poole, Kings Theatre, Southsea, Richmond Theatre, London, Civic Theatre, Darlington, Babbacombe Theatre, Torquay, Theatre Royal, Plymouth, New Theatre Royal Lincoln, Liverpool Empire Theatre, Swan Theatre, Worcester, His Majesty's Theatre, Aberdeen, Orchard Theatre, Dartford and Ashcroft Theatre, Croydon
1985	I Have Been Here Before	Dr Görtler	The Cambridge Arts Theatre, Marlowe Theatre, Canterbury, King's Theatre, Glasgow, Eden Court Theatre, Inverness, Kings Theatre, Southsea, Towngate Theatre, Poole, Ashcroft Theatre, Croydon, The Capitol Theatre, Horsham, Grand Theatre, Wolverhampton, Forum Theatre, Billingham, Oxford Playhouse, His Majesty's Theatre, Aberdeen, Key Theatre, Peterborough and New Theatre, Cardiff
1985–86	The Apple Cart	Nicobar	The Theatre Royal, Bath and the Theatre Royal Haymarket, London
1989	Towards Zero	Matthew Treves	The Churchill Theatre, Bromley, Theatre Royal, Brighton, Cambridge Arts Theatre, The Hexagon, Reading, The Alexandra, Birmingham, Theatre Royal, Nottingham, Hull New Theatre, Derngate Theatre, Northampton, Grand Theatre, Blackpool, Grand Theatre, Wolverhampton, Theatre Royal, Margate, Liverpool Empire Theatre, New Theatre Royal Lincoln, Ashcroft Theatre, Croydon, Wyvern Theatre, Swindon, Theatre Royal, Windsor, Theatre Royal, Newcastle, Manchester Opera House, Forum Theatre, Billingham, His Majesty's Theatre, Aberdeen and Eden Court Theatre, Inverness
1990	Sunsets and Glories	Cardinal Latino Malabranca Orsini	The West Yorkshire Leeds Playhouse, Leeds
1992	Cerceau	Nikolai Lvovitch (Koka)	The Orange Tree Theatre, Richmond
