= Die Psychologie des Verbrechers =

1916 book by Paul Pollitz

Die Psychologie des Verbrechers - Kriminalpsychologie
- Author: Dr. med. Paul Pollitz
- Language: German
- Series: Aus Natur und Geisteswelt, Issue 248
- Subject: criminology, criminal psychology, crime statistics
- Genre: handbook
- Publisher: Teubner (DE)
- Publication date: 1916
- Publication place: Germany
- Media type: print book
- Pages: 128 (second edition)
- Preceded by: Strafe und Verbrechen (1910)

Die Psychologie des Verbrechers – Kriminalpsychologie (English: The psychology of a felon – criminal psychology; 2nd edition) was a book written by Dr. med. Paul Pollitz and published in Leipzig, Germany, in 1916. It is a summary of previous findings on psychological, social and economic characteristics of criminals for a variety of different crime types based on the statistics of the early 20th century. The focus lies on three main causes for committing crimes, which can interact or are presented in solitude. These causes depict crimes as a result of socio-economic circumstances, impaired psyche, and/ or personality of the criminal.

The book is divided into five main categories, which include an introduction to the necessity of criminal psychology, followed by the second section on Lombroso's theory of a criminal's psychological characteristics. Afterwards, the third main section, namely general criminal psychology and statistics, presents different frequency numbers and trends of crimes in various background, including for instance sex, age, profession, and marriage relations to crime. Furthermore, the fourth main section deals with specific criminal psychology and describes crimes of people with mental illnesses, alcoholism, prostitution, puberty, and others. The closing words highlight the areas, which the author believes to be most crucial to interfere with in order to decrease the frequency of crime.

== Historical background ==
During the end of the 19th century, criminal psychology became known as a proper field of studies due to Cesare Lombroso's research on characteristics of the "criminal man" (1876). Inspired by Charles Darwin recently published theory of evolution, Lombroso conducted anthropological research and performed extensive analyses on physiological, psychological, zoological and ethnological characteristics of criminals. Based on his results, he concluded that a habitual criminal can be seen as a regression of the human being to his very roots as a wild, uncivilized person. This regression is also called atavism, and, according to Lombroso, explains a large number of criminal acts. Further, Lombroso stated that criminality is an inheritable feature which can be detected by presence of tattoos or a felon's physiognomy, meaning measurements based on visible face and skull characteristics. Charles Goring was the first to refute a relation of physical aspects and criminality-likelihood with an extensive study that compared non-criminals to convicts on numerous physical features and mental abilities. Goring's results, published in 1913, could not support Lombroso's findings on inheritable criminality. In the presently reviewed book, Pollitz refers to Lombroso and his theory's current status in criminal psychology.

== Content ==
=== Lombroso's theory ===
Pollitz denies the correctness of Lombroso's investigations on criminal physiognomy, as at that time the accuracy of such measures has already been discredited. However, Lombroso's notes on the lack of empathy, cold-hearted cruelty and indifference, and even on tattoos and racketeer language are picked up at later parts of the book. Moreover, Pollitz supports Lombroso's description of the habitual female criminal, whose physical built is supposedly very similar to a man's body. In the following topics of the book, Pollitz bases several sub-topics on areas that Lombroso already identified as being significant to criminal statistics and crucial to consider in mathematical analyses.

=== General criminal psychology - Overview of criminal statistics ===
Pollitz emphasizes the importance of statistics in criminal psychology, for which it is essential to also inspect the reasons for a decrease or increase in criminality. Here are a few examples of his disquisition on criminal statistics:

==== Psychology of the sexes ====
At the time of publication, a small step in the direction of improving emancipation could be observed by decreasing marriage rates and an increasing variety of work that women took part in. The slight reluctance to such independence might be sensed when reading through Pollitz's description of sex differences in criminal acts. By quoting other authors on criminality, he supports the point that women who are increasingly participating in non-traditional work would lead to a larger number of criminal women, as this work is not in accord with the “Natur des [weiblichen] Geschlechts” (English: “nature of the [female] sex”). Additionally, Pollitz justifies the far higher number of male criminals, which has a ratio of 5:1 to female criminals, with the higher number of possible crimes that men can be prosecuted for. As an example, he indicates child's murder or abortion to be hardly provable, whereas men could easily be found guilty for sex crimes. Furthermore, Pollitz describes that the previously mentioned ratio varies between different crime types and especially perjury shows a much higher ratio for women than for men (8:3). Perjury is described as a typical "female crime", justified by the following observation: "Nicht nur die Unfähigkeit der Frauen, Erlebtes und Beobachtetes ohne Beimengung von Erfundenem und Phantastischem zu reproduzieren, sondern auch die starke Gefühlsbeeinflussung macht sie zu unsicheren Zeuginnen, besonders wenn eigene Interessen (Freundschaft, Liebe, Feindschaft, Hass) mit in Frage kommen." (English: Not only women's inability to reproduce experiences and observations without interference of imaginations and phantasies, but also the strong influence of emotions makes women uncertain witnesses, especially when her interests (friendship, love, enmity, hate) are affected.)

==== Relation of mental illness and crime ====
Even at the time of publication, the law prevented any mentally disabled person to be responsible for his or her actions. The first described type of psychological characteristics related to crime reminds of the DSM-5's characteristics for antisocial personality disorder, which Pollitz explains to be heritable. As an illustration of such, he shows a pedigree with all the crimes existent in that family. With the example itself, he does not claim "lunatics" to be wild apes but rather that mania in its common meaning might be an heritable illness.

A further type of mental illness is epilepsy. Its resulting degeneration of character is widely considered in criminal psychology, as it is strongly related to idiocy, indifference, egoism and sometimes tremendous cruelty. Further, when epileptic seizures decrease in number with increasing age, the result of such illness is solely the changed character without the visible physiological symptoms. Taking into account previous illnesses like epilepsy when evaluating a criminal's motives can improve understanding of some criminal acts. Pollitz’ s general conclusion states, that the relation of mental impairment and crime is most often some form of deteriorated intelligence related to a variety of different crimes.

== Reception ==
The following book receptions refer to the first edition of Pollitz's Die Psychologie der Verbrecher (1908). However, there are few differences between the first and the second edition, as the presently reviewed second edition mostly differs in the calculated statistics, which are updated for the new year of publication (1916). Generally, Pollitz was a respected prison director and therefore, his research was perceived as reliable and accurate. Especially Henderson (1912) describes the first edition and Pollitz's only other book, Strafe und Verbrechen (1910) in a very positive light by using terms as "remarkable" and "illuminating". Moreover, he finds the information given by the handbook informative and properly researched.

Even though Upson (1911) does not indicate the opposite, he is restricting his enthusiasm by commenting on the downside of Pollitz's handbook. Upson mentions the limitations of content in so far that the book only focuses on a few causes for criminality. Nevertheless, he agrees that the most important factors are considered and the less scientific features, like Lombroso's anthropological notion, are discarded. Further criticism hints at the fact that Pollitz only enlists the factors which increase the frequency of criminal acts, but he does not provide any idea of improvement on economic, social, or cultural matters, nor does he indicate a potentially better-fit treatment for mentally-ill criminals.

== See also ==
- Die Psychologie des Verbrechens - eine Kritik
