= The Expert (TV series) =

British TV drama series (1968–1976)

- Radio Times cover, June 1968
- Genre: Detective fiction
- Created by: N. J. Crisp; Gerard Glaister; Cyril Abraham
- Written by: N. J. Crisp; Gerard Glaister
- Directed by: Prudence Fitzgerald; Ben Rea
- Starring: Marius Goring; Jeremy Sinden; Ann Morrish; Victor Winding; Michael Farnsworth; Virginia Stride
- Opening theme: Symphony No. 4 in D minor, Op. 13, B. 41, third movement
- Composer: Antonín Dvořák
- Country of origin: United Kingdom
- Original language: English
- No. of series: 4
- No. of episodes: 62 (14 missing)

Production
- Producers: Gerard Glaister; Andrew Osborn
- Running time: 50 minutes
- Production company: BBC

Original release
- Network: BBC2
- Release: 5 July 1968 – 26 November 1976

The Expert is a British television series produced by the BBC between 5 July 1968 and 26 November 1976. It ran for 62 episodes over four series.

The series starred Marius Goring as Dr. (later Professor) John Hardy, a forensic pathologist based in Warwickshire working for the Home Office. It was essentially a police procedural drama, with Hardy bringing his forensic knowledge to solve various cases. He was sometimes assisted in his work by his wife Jo, a GP, played by Ann Morrish; the cases he investigated were usually in conjunction with detectives Fleming (Victor Winding) and Ashe (Michael Farnsworth) of the Warwickshire police.

The fourth series (from 1976) was produced and transmitted several years after the first three (which were broadcast between 1968 and 1971). Several changes were made to the show, as only Goring returned from the original cast. Hardy was now a widower living in Oxford; the only other regulars in this final batch of shows were his secretary Susan Bartlett (Virginia Stride) and his lab assistant Price (Jeremy Sinden).

The Expert was created and produced by Gerard Glaister. The series was one of the first BBC dramas to be made in colour, and throughout its four series had guest appearances from (among others) John Carson, Peter Copley, Rachel Kempson, Peter Vaughan, Clive Swift, Geoffrey Palmer, Peter Barkworth, Jean Marsh, Ray Brooks, George Sewell, Anthony Valentine, Jeff Shankley, Bernard Lee, Lee Montague, Geoffrey Bayldon, Mike Pratt, Edward Fox, André Morell, Brian Blessed, Nigel Stock, Philip Madoc and Warren Clarke.

== Cast ==
Main recurring characters across all four series.

Character	Season 1	Season 2	Season 3	Season 4
Prof. John Hardy	Marius Goring	Marius Goring	Marius Goring	Marius Goring
Jo Hardy	Ann Morrish	Ann Morrish	Ann Morrish	
DCI Fleming	Victor Winding	Victor Winding	Victor Winding	
DS Frank Ashe	Michael Farnsworth	Michael Farnsworth	Michael Farnsworth	
Sandra Hughes		Valerie Murray	Valerie Murray	
Susan Bartlett				Virginia Stride
Jane Carter	Sally Nesbitt			
Vicky Hammond	Cleo Sylvestre			
DCS Mowbray		John Collin		
Price				Jeremy Sinden

== Archive status ==
Most of the original videotapes of this show were wiped by the BBC, mainly from series one and two. As a result, 14 episodes are missing, mostly from series one, leaving 48 surviving. Although many episodes survive only as black and white telerecordings, the series was produced in colour. One episode of series two, six episodes of series three and the whole of series four exist as their original colour versions.

== Episode list ==
=== Series 1 ===
No. overall	No. in series	Title	Directed by	Written by	Archival Status	Original release date
1	1	"The Unknown Factor"	Gerard Glaister	N. J. Crisp	Missing	5 July 1968
A forensic expert can become involved in crime in many ways. Often he will act for the police, but there are times when he can be called in by other interested parties. Dr. John Hardy is no exception and even when he has no particular liking for the people employing him he will always ferret out the facts. When these facts do not prove to be advantageous to his clients he can find himself in a difficult position. Troubles arise when Dr. Hardy discovers the 'unknown factor'. Three bullets, a dead man and £50,000 in insurance – this is the background to this intriguing opening case.
2	2	"It Can't Be Done"	Paul Ciappessoni	John Pennington	TR16	12 July 1968
When Penny Goodwin shoots her husband in cold blood, there appears to be no motive. This is the most difficult and at the same time the easiest of murders to deal with. Penny Goodwin has murdered her husband – that is a clear fact. Why she has killed him is far from clear. When Hardy starts an investigation for the defence, he uncovers a most ingenious plot, which even Chief Inspector Fleming will not believe. Guest stars David Langton, Robert James and Edward Dentith.
3	3	"Liars, Damn Liars"	John Gould	Ben Rea	Missing	19 July 1968
The actual causes of death and even the accurate timing of the death can be essential to a defence in a trial. Dr. Hardy is confronted with just such problems and is convinced that he can get any serious charge against his client thrown out of court. In a tense trial scene Hardy appears as the expert witness for the defence and finds himself opposed by his former professor.
4	4	"Miss Daley"	Prudence Fitzgerald	N. J. Crisp	Missing	26 July 1968
Miss Daley has given up working as a solicitor's secretary because her old boss is leaving. When she finds out that he is still with the firm she becomes very ill. She goes to see Jo Hardy about her collapse and tells Jo that she is convinced she has heart trouble. Unfortunately, Miss Daley trails trouble after her, and Jo soon finds that there is very much more to this case than meets the eye. Guest stars Rachel Kempson, Colin Douglas, Kenneth Farrington, Zohra Sehgal and Edward Kelsey.
5	5	"Nice Day"	Paul Ciappessoni	N. J. Crisp	Missing	2 August 1968
A woman is assaulted in a park and the only witness is her young daughter. The police are certain they know who did it, but the girl cannot identify the man in an identity parade. Hardy sees her domineering mother-in-law and her ineffectual husband, but gets no help from either of them. It is only when Inspector Fleming arrives at his laboratory that the pieces begin to fall into place. Guest stars Rebecca Saire, Gary Watson, Mike Lucas and Gary Smith.
6	6	"The Long Hate"	Raymond Menmuir	William Emms	Missing	9 August 1968
Mr. Toller is a man of immense personal ability. A self-made man who has no time for the weak or the idle. A man without humour. A man indeed who creates hatred. Jo Hardy is treating Toller for some inexplicable illness. The patient makes it no easier for Jo by his overbearing arrogance but she patiently tries to diagnose what is causing his illness, which becomes more and more serious. Guest stars Peter Vaughan and Gilbert Wynne.
7	7	"Nobody's Going to Hurt You"	Ben Rea	John Pennington	Missing	16 August 1968
When a woman is found dead in the early morning by the side of a railway line Hardy is brought in to help the police with their investigations. The woman has been murdered, and as they piece together a picture of the man, the police and Hardy realise that they have a dangerous psychopath loose in their area. Dead women, trains, wedding rings, a lipstick, and a glove are all links in this macabre investigation. Guest star Joby Blanshard, Alethea Charlton and Michael Hawkins.
8	8	"Here Lies..."	Shaun O'Riordan	Robert Barr	Missing	23 August 1968
An old man dies. It is only when his housekeeper returns some unused tablets to the chemist that any sort of suspicion clouds the issue. Hardy is brought in to conduct various tests and he questions the principals in the case. The conclusion he reaches is arrived at only after he has very carefully weighed up all the factors in the case, and even so his decision is a surprise. Guest stars Lewis Fiander, Brian Oulton and Reginald Barratt.
9	9	"The Contact"	Ben Rea	Cyril Abraham	Missing	30 August 1968
A man falls overboard from a ship arriving in the estuary near Hull. He is washed ashore dead. Because of injuries sustained in the water he is unrecognisable. It's amazing how a single situation like this can lead on to the most complex crimes. The most careful planning can go awry so easily, and only an expert can interpret the facts with which he is presented. Guest stars Barry Creyton, Harold Goodwin, Peter Madden, Michael Brennan, Alan Tilvern, Tony Caunter, Reg Pritchard and Brian Badcoe.
10	10	"He's Good For It"	Prudence Fitzgerald	N. J. Crisp	Missing	6 September 1968
When a safe is blown and the job has all the trademarks of a known criminal it seems reasonable for the police to pull in that man for questioning. Fleming finds himself in this position but in pulling two men in for the crime he seems to forget that he needs concrete information that will pin the crime on them both. With Hardy working for the other side, Fleming gets into deeper and deeper water. Guest stars David Langton, Olaf Pooley, Clive Swift and Jimmy Gardner.
11	11	"Fire Without Smoke"	Prudence Fitzgerald	John Gould	Missing	13 September 1968
The death of small children is always tragic. The tragedy is increased by unspoken prejudices and the possibility that one of the parents may be to blame. Guest stars Kenneth Colley and Zia Mohyeddin.
12	12	"Full Choke"	Ben Rea	Dick Sharples	Missing	20 September 1968
The Hardys are enjoying the peace of a perfect English summer evening. Then the quiet is shattered by the noise of a shotgun. Later a man is brought to Dr. Jo Hardy's surgery. He has been peppered with shotgun pellets. The wounds are not fatal but John Hardy decides that this is a case for the police. Could it be attempted murder? Someone is either a dangerous lunatic, or a man with a grudge, or a very twisted sense of humour. It proves a most puzzling case for Fleming and Hardy but one, which has its lighter side. Guest stars Derek Benfield, Iain Anders, Donald Bisset, Edward Evans, Geoffrey Hinsliff, John Rolfe, John Baddeley and Frederick Treves.
13	13	"And So Say All of Us"	Ronald Wilson	Mervyn Haisman & Henry Lincoln	Missing	27 September 1968
A drunken driver is responsible for the death of his brother-in-law and business partner and for the death of the driver of the second car involved in the accident. But when Hardy comes into the investigation, a number of factors emerge which point away from its being the driver's responsibility. Who is guilty of the deaths? Hardy's concern for the facts leads to an exciting conclusion. Guest stars Geoffrey Chater, Tom Chatto, John Nettleton, John Stratton, Del Henney, David Hargreaves and Jim McManus.

=== Series 2 ===
No. overall	No. in series	Title	Directed by	Written by	Archival Status	Original release date
14	1	"The Visitor: Part 1: Hypothesis"	Prudence Fitzgerald	John Gould	TR16	4 April 1969
The first episode in a three-part story. A series of murders in the area involves Dr. Hardy deeply. Each crime is similar to the last. One person must have committed them; but who? With the few indefinite clues available, Dr. Hardy tries to build up a picture of this paranoiac killer to give the police some indication of the type of person to look for. One more attack takes place, but this time the victim survives. A suspect is arrested, but the surviving victim has amnesia, through shock. She is the only person who can make a positive identification. Guest stars Harry Beety, Louise Pajo, Geoffrey Palmer and Neil McCallum.
15	2	"The Visitor: Part 2: Hard Facts"	Hugh David	John Gould	TR16	11 April 1969
The second part of this three-part story. The suspect has been detained for questioning. Dr. Hardy is working in his laboratory trying to piece together the burnt fragments of a scrap of paper found in the man's room. Jo Hardy has been asked to try to break the surviving victim's amnesia by hypnosis. Witnesses are being interrogated by the police. The suspect is being questioned at length. The case builds up around him. He is held on a minor charge. The evidence collected strengthens the case against him. But nothing can be certain until the verdict is given at the conclusion of the trial. Next week's concluding episode deals with the trial of the suspect. Guest stars Harry Beety, Geoffrey Palmer, Arnold Peters and Neil McCallum.
16	3	"The Visitor: Part 3: Judgement"	Ronald Wilson	John Gould	TR16	18 April 1969
Martin Ingram, who has been arrested for assaulting Vivien, stands trial for his alleged crime. He is defended by a brilliant woman Q.C. The main action in this episode takes place in the court and the result of the trial remains in doubt until almost the last moment. Guest stars Harry Beety, Geoffrey Palmer, Fulton Mackay, Alan MacNaughtan and Neil McCallum.
17	4	"The Yellow Torrish"	Prudence Fitzgerald	Mervyn Haisman & Henry Lincoln	TR16	25 April 1969
A smashed lock, a bloodstained jacket, a drifting boat...and a takeover bid. Dr. Hardy accepts a case, which takes him out of his own exact world of scientific evidence and into the speculative world of finance. And yet, even in strange waters, with the aid of a few bright feathers and silk thread he solves the mystery of a disappearing man. Guest stars Peter Barkworth, Jean Marsh, Basil Henson, Eric Dodson, Timothy Bateson and Glyn Owen.
18	5	"The Gun That Walked"	Hugh David	N. J. Crisp	TR16	2 May 1969
When violent death strikes down a pretty farm girl, Dr. Hardy and Inspector Fleming come up against a wall of reserve. Overshadowing everything is the domineering father. Persistence at last brings Dr. Hardy to a 'not inconsiderable suspicion' of the killer's identity. But proof... Guest stars Ray Brooks, Margaret Courtenay, Peter Welch, Brian Cant, John Tate, Michael Forrest and Paul Grist.
19	6	"One Life: More or Less"	Prudence Fitzgerald	N. J. Crisp	TR16	9 May 1969
Illegitimate babies present problems. Bringing one up in an atmosphere of disapproval can be harder than the alternative. To some, the decision is easy; a matter of practical common sense. To others it's life and death. Guest stars Leon Eagles, Reg Lye and Angela Pleasence.
20	7	"A Question of Guilt"	Viktors Ritelis	John Pennington	TR16	16 May 1969
A man is found guilty of murdering his wife and sentenced to life imprisonment – could he be innocent? Unquestionably, the facts prove him guilty. Or do they? Guest stars Bernard Kay, Colette O'Neil, Christopher Robbie, Dominic Allan, John Levene, Bernard G. High, Philip Ryan, David Simeon and Dave Carter.
21	8	"A Family Affair"	Ronald Wilson	Mervyn Haisman & Henry Lincoln	TR16	23 May 1969
Estate Duties – a curse to be avoided? When a businessman is found drowned it could mean ruin for his family. Guest stars Geoffrey Chater, Gabrielle Daye, Peter Howell, Catherine Lacey and Hildegard Neil.
22	9	"Death in the Rain"	Prudence Fitzgerald	N. J. Crisp	TR16	30 May 1969
That little Lucille died a violent death was certain; how she died was more obscure. Dr. Hardy's painstaking research and insistence on accuracy finally establishes the truth but sometimes emotions are stronger than scientific evidence the unreasoning heart of man overrules his head. Guest stars Gillian Bailey, Michael Gwynn, Glyn Houston, Graham Weston, Frederick Hall and Mark Heath.
23	10	"Protection"	Paul Ciappessoni	John Pennington	TR16	6 June 1969
Protection: you can refuse to pay, you can go to the police for their protection – or you can stand the risk yourself. Guest stars Sam Kydd, George Sewell, Anthony Valentine and Reg Lever.
24	11	"Post-Mortem on Harry Kirby"	Paul Ciappessoni	N. J. Crisp	TR16	13 June 1969
A grocer, Harry Kirby, lies dead – poisoned, electrocuted, and gassed. If suicide can be established, surely this is gilding the lily. Why was a large sum of money found laid out neatly beside the body? And if it wasn't suicide, how did he die? Guest stars Bernard Lee, Lee Montague and Wanda Ventham.
25	12	"Do Not Go Gentle"	Prudence Fitzgerald	John Gould	TR16	20 June 1969
An old man relies upon his daughter to look after him during convalescence but she has her own life to lead. Guest stars Sandra Bryant, James Laurenson, Ralph Michael, Alethea Charlton, Nicholas Evans and Patrick Tull.
26	13	"Playing with Fire"	Derek Martinus	John Pennington	TR16	27 June 1969
A hospital ward is destroyed by fire. Could it be deliberate – and if so, who would want to burn down a hospital and why? Guest stars Geoffrey Bayldon, Clifford Mollison, Tim Preece, Nicolette Pendrell and Barbara Leake.
27	14	"The Sardonic Smile"	Ronald Wilson	Robert Barr	TR16	4 July 1969
A tightening of the chest, a sudden convulsion. Only the heels and head touching the floor. Like a bow. Face muscles tightening, eyes staring, teeth clenched, lips pulled back into a sardonic smile. The classic symptoms of strychnine poisoning. When a wealthy landowner dies after eating a trout, freshly caught, the question is who poisoned him? And how? Guest stars Brian Oulton, Amanda Walker, Robert Hartley and Bill McGuirk.
28	15	"The Witness: Part 1: Threats"	Prudence Fitzgerald	John Pennington	TR16	11 July 1969
When Jo Hardy's car is run off the road by a lorry it may be that the driver is guilty of dangerous driving. But when Dr. John Hardy receives a letter threatening his wife's life and demanding that he changes his evidence in an important murder trial, it can be seen as a technique of persuasion. Hardy refuses to be suborned but it is at the risk of his wife's life. Guest stars John Bailey, Kenneth Farrington and Anthony Valentine.
29	16	"The Witness: Part 2: Involvement"	Peter Cregeen	John Pennington	TR16	18 July 1969
Dr. Hardy is involved in tracing a ruthless psychotic killer who is employed by the accused in an attempt to suborn witnesses. He is determined to give his evidence, but the police issue firearms to protect his life. Guest stars John Bailey, Kenneth Farrington and Anthony Valentine.
30	17	"The Blue Spot"	Peter Cregeen	N. J. Crisp	TR16	25 July 1969
A doctor may reasonably diagnose a brain tumour as the cause of death of his first wife. But when his second wife dies in similar circumstances and both are known to have been wealthy women, questions are asked. Guest stars Leo Genn, Michael Sheard, Roy Spencer, Brian Peck, Edward Kelsey and John Livesey.
31	18	"Lethal Weapon"	Ronald Wilson	N. J. Crisp	TR16	1 August 1969
A woman lies dead in a country road, apparently the victim of a hit-and-run driver. But something doesn't quite fit. She lived in the town. Why would she be in the country at that time – in those shoes? And what about the tyre marks? Guest stars Meg Wynn Owen, Michael Sheard, Brian Peck, Alan Bennion, Clifford Cox and Jon Croft.
32	19	"Lie Down, You're Dead"	Prudence Fitzgerald	David T. Chantler	TR16	8 August 1969
A man is shot three times in front of witnesses. When the police arrive there is no body. Has he been shot? Is he really dead? Guest stars Lyndon Brook, Sylvia Kay, Beatrix Lehmann, John Nettles, Roddy McMillan and Edward Brayshaw.
33	20	"Eddie"	Prudence Fitzgerald	Ray Jenkins	Missing	15 August 1969
Eddie, a pensioner, spends much of his time in a betting shop working out his half-crown accumulators. After a win of forty pounds he is found strangled in his own home. His grandson, who lived with him, is missing. Would the boy murder his own grandfather? Why is he trying to leave the country with forty pounds in his pocket? Guest stars Kenneth Colley, Glyn Jones, Daphne Heard, Paddy Joyce and Jay Neill.
34	21	"No Home in the City"	Ronald Wilson	N. J. Crisp	TR16	22 August 1969
While its owner is on holiday an abandoned dog wanders the streets and becomes savage, causing the death of a derelict meths-drinker. Could there be some similarity in the lives of man and dog? Have they both experienced a loss they cannot understand? Guest stars Raymond Adamson, John Bryans, Derrick O'Connor, Jimmy Gardner, Norman Henry, Peter Ducrow and Gordon Richardson.
35	22	"Your Money for My Life"	Ben Rea	John Lucarotti	TR16	29 August 1969
A clear straight road; a dry morning; a good car. Why should a businessman crash into a bridge support at 80 mph? Why are there no skid marks? When the post-mortem reveals him to have died as a result of the impact, and not from physical causes, and the car is found to be mechanically sound – what other reason could there be for the accident? Or was it an accident? Guest stars Petra Markham and Simon Oates.
36	23	"Dependence: Part 1: A Life Saved"	Prudence Fitzgerald	N. J. Crisp	TR16	5 September 1969
Drug addiction is an increasing problem in our society. In the first episode of a two-part story, the hopelessness of the addict is matched against the efforts of doctors to control the terrible effect of the drug. Guest stars Tom Chadbon, Moray Watson, David Hargreaves and Edward Kelsey.
37	24	"Dependence: Part 2: A Life Lost"	Ronald Wilson	N. J. Crisp	TR16	12 September 1969
It is said that drug addicts make poor parents. How do a young couple, both of whom are addicts, cope with attending to the needs of their small baby? How does one begin to take drugs in the first place? Should a drug addict marry? The harsh realism of these two episodes owes a great deal to the painstaking, and often painful, research done by the producer, director, and scriptwriter in the twilight world of London's drug addicts – a world where people are middle-aged at 20 and dead by 30. Guest stars Tom Chadbon, Moray Watson, Frances White, David Hargreaves and Edward Kelsey.
38	25	"Flesh and Blood"	William Sterling	John Pennington	VT625	19 September 1969
Once a man suspects that his 10-year-old son is not in fact his, he cannot rest until he has discovered the truth. Guest stars William Lucas, Ann Lynn and Dudley Foster.
39	26	"Sufficiently Loved and Cared For"	Prudence Fitzgerald	John Gould	Missing	26 September 1969
Threatening suicide is often a cry for help, sometimes that cry is heeded, sometimes assistance is too late. Guest stars James Bree, Mary Merrall and Jay Neill.

=== Series 3 ===
No. overall	No. in series	Title	Directed by	Written by	Archival Status	Original release date
40	1	"A Way to Die"	Prudence Fitzgerald	Eric Paice	VT625	3 January 1971
The body of a student is found in a pig-fattening shed. Hardy has to establish the cause of death. Guest stars Windsor Davies, Richard Easton, Gawn Grainger, Roger Hammond, George Waring and Donald Gee.
41	2	"Where Are You Going?"	Viktors Ritelis	John Pennington	TR16	10 January 1971
The body of an attractive young girl is found by the roadside. Who was she? How did she get there? How did she die? Hardy and Fleming are faced with finding the answer. Guest stars Jonathan Newth, Candace Glendenning, Mike Pratt, Nicolette Roeg, Stuart Saunders, Ralph Arliss, Diana Chappell, Bernard G. High and Tim Condren.
42	3	"The Man on My Back"	Ben Rea	Eric Paice	VT625	17 January 1971
Fleming and Hardy are used to hit-and-run cases where they find a body but no car. In this curious case the situation is reversed: a blood-stained car but no body. Guest stars Edward Fox, Bernard Kay and Charles Pemberton.
43	4	"Go Somewhere Else"	Viktors Ritelis	N. J. Crisp	TR16	24 January 1971
Gypsies led by Samuel Brown arrive in the Hardy neighbourhood – to the horror of many residents. A public meeting is called to discuss the 'problem'. But protest can go too far. Guest stars David Garfield, Dorothy Gordon, Godfrey James, Kenton Moore, Salvin Stewart and Jack Woolgar.
44	5	"Whose Child?: Part 1: The Wife"	Ben Rea	N. J. Crisp	TR16	31 January 1971
After fifteen years of childless marriage, Ruth Fletcher has a son. But she has a problem, which she takes to Jo Hardy: is it possible that her husband is not the father? Guest stars Anthony Bate, Ann Lynn, James Maxwell and Geoffrey Palmer.
45	6	"Whose Child?: Part 2: The Husband"	Prudence Fitzgerald	N. J. Crisp	TR16	7 February 1971
Dr Hardy has told Harry Fletcher that he could not be the father of his wife's child. Harry confronts his wife's lover, Michael Jackson. Guest stars Anthony Bate, Ann Lynn, James Maxwell and Aubrey Richards.
46	7	"Cedric"	Ben Rea	Ray Jenkins	TR16	14 February 1971
Cedric Lambert, a lonely 54-year-old bachelor, visits Dr Jo Hardy in her surgery. But apparently there is nothing wrong with his health – all he wishes to do is to show her an antique book. Guest stars Peter Jeffrey, John Cater, Margot Thomas and Renu Setna.
47	8	"A Scientific Fact"	Prudence Fitzgerald	John Gould	VT625	21 February 1971
Hardy is much possessed by the problems surrounding the scientific fact of death. And in this story of an elderly retired Major, his wife and son, the police become totally involved as well. Guest stars Sylvia Coleridge, David Horovitch, André Morell and Brian Badcoe.
48	9	"The Coat"	Prudence Fitzgerald	N. J. Crisp	VT625	28 February 1971
Early one morning a young Maltese girl is found stabbed to death. Fleming is immediately convinced that her ex-boyfriend is guilty. Hardy has other ideas. Guest stars Steven Berkoff, David Horovitch, Peter Diamond, Eric Dodson, Nerys Hughes and David March.
49	10	"True Confession"	Viktors Ritelis	N. J. Crisp	VT625	7 March 1971
A young librarian finds a body in the woods. He does not tell the police but the press, which for Hardy and Fleming adds confusion to an already confusing case. Guest stars Barry McCarthy, Hamilton Dyce, Derrick Gilbert and George Giles.
50	11	"Smithereens"	Viktors Ritelis	John Pennington	TR16	14 March 1971
The milkman pays his morning call on Mrs Carr, and finds her lying unconscious on the conservatory floor. She is surrounded by fragments of a milk bottle – which lead to several sleepless nights for Hardy and Sandra. Guest stars Lucy Griffiths, Robert Grange, William Morgan Sheppard and Paul Humpoletz.
51	12	"Hothouse"	Ben Rea	Jeremy Burnham	TR16	21 March 1971
Two young boys have their day's fishing disturbed when they find a body in the river. The question facing Fleming and Hardy: did he fall or was he pushed? Guest stars Peter Diamond, Noel Johnson and Sarah Lawson.
52	13	"A Clear and Easy Duty"	Prudence Fitzgerald	Jeremy Burnham	VT625	28 March 1971
In the last of this series, Hardy and Fleming are faced with the kidnapping of a son of wealthy parents – not so unusual for them but strange and unfortunate for Jo when she becomes involved. Guest stars Brian Blessed and William Lucas.

=== Series 4 ===
No. overall	No. in series	Title	Directed by	Written by	Archival Status	Original release date
53	1	"The Second Appeal"	Gerard Glaister	N. J. Crisp	VT625	24 September 1976
Hardy is asked to do a further post mortem by the defence in the second appeal of a man convicted of the murder of his wife. The first post mortem was done by an old colleague and Hardy's findings conflict, straining their friendship. Guest stars Paul Chapman, Richard Hurndall, Noel Johnson, Peter Forbes-Robertson and Philip Ryan.
54	2	"Blood Line"	David Sullivan Proudfoot	Roger Parkes	VT625	1 October 1976
An Arab ruler suddenly dies in London and Hardy is caught up in a situation of political intrigue. Guest stars Peter Arne, Damien Thomas, Edgar Wreford, Frank Mills and Michael Bangerter.
55	3	"Inheritance"	David Sullivan Proudfoot	Gerald Kelsey	VT625	8 October 1976
Motive, opportunity, possession of the weapon and an alibi that won't stand up. Who wants more to prove guilt of murder? Hardy involves himself in a case that affects one of his oldest friends. Guest stars Nigel Stock, John Rolfe, John Harvey and John Hamill.
56	4	"Prejudice"	Gerald Blake	Allan Prior	VT625	15 October 1976
When a headless skeleton is found the bones indicate one solution and the remnants of clothing another. Guest stars Frederick Hall, Richard Beale, Max Faulkner and Jay Neill.
57	5	"A Family Affair"	Peter Graham Scott	Michael J. Bird	VT625	22 October 1976
An elaborate plan goes wrong because of a woman's intuition. Guest stars Lisa Harrow, Jeremy Clyde, Terence Longdon, Philip Madoc, Elizabeth Spriggs, Edmund Pegge and George Ballantine.
58	6	"Suspended Verdict"	Gerald Blake	Jeremy Burnham	VT625	29 October 1976
Many things can go awry when the law is exercised by the wrong people. Guest stars John Bowe, Veronica Strong, Nigel Lambert, Norman Henry and Martin Neil.
59	7	"Suspicious Death"	David Sullivan Proudfoot	Allan Prior	VT625	5 November 1976
The police and Hardy are greatly puzzled by the death of a mortuary attendant. Guest stars Warren Clarke, Tim Woodward, Michael Feast, Norma West and Frederick Schiller.
60	8	"Fail Safe"	Peter Graham Scott	Brian Clemens	VT625	12 November 1976
Did evidence Hardy gave in a murder trial 13 years ago result in a miscarriage of justice? Hardy feels that he must pursue the truth of the case, no matter the personal cost. Guest stars Edward de Souza, Tim Barlow, John Woodnutt, Michael Troughton, William Wilde, Nancie Jackson and John Forgeham.
61	9	"Hour of the Snake"	Vere Lorrimer	Roger Parkes	VT625	19 November 1976
A spell is cast which results in a death at 'The Hour of the Snake'. Is it murder – or what? Guest stars Elizabeth Adare, Tom Chadbon, Clifton Jones, Michael Sheard, Nicholas Donnelly, Oscar James and Peter Tuddenham.
62	10	"Tainted Money"	Gerald Blake	Pip and Jane Baker	VT625	26 November 1976
One can legislate for most things – but how do you cope with human frailty and greed? In the very last episode of the series, Professor Hardy is unwillingly pulled into a case that, while it makes him very uncomfortable, dictates that he must follow his strict code of ensuring scientific honesty, whatever the outcome. Guest stars Richard Griffiths, Milton Johns, Hugh Manning and Nigel Humphreys.

== Legacy and influence ==
The idea of television series centered around the investigations of a forensic pathologist had previously been pioneered by the Canadian TV series Wojeck (1966–68). A similar concept would later be adopted by the American television series Quincy, M.E. and CSI, and the British television series Silent Witness.
