= Die Psychologie des Verbrechens - eine Kritik =

1912 book by Max Kauffmann

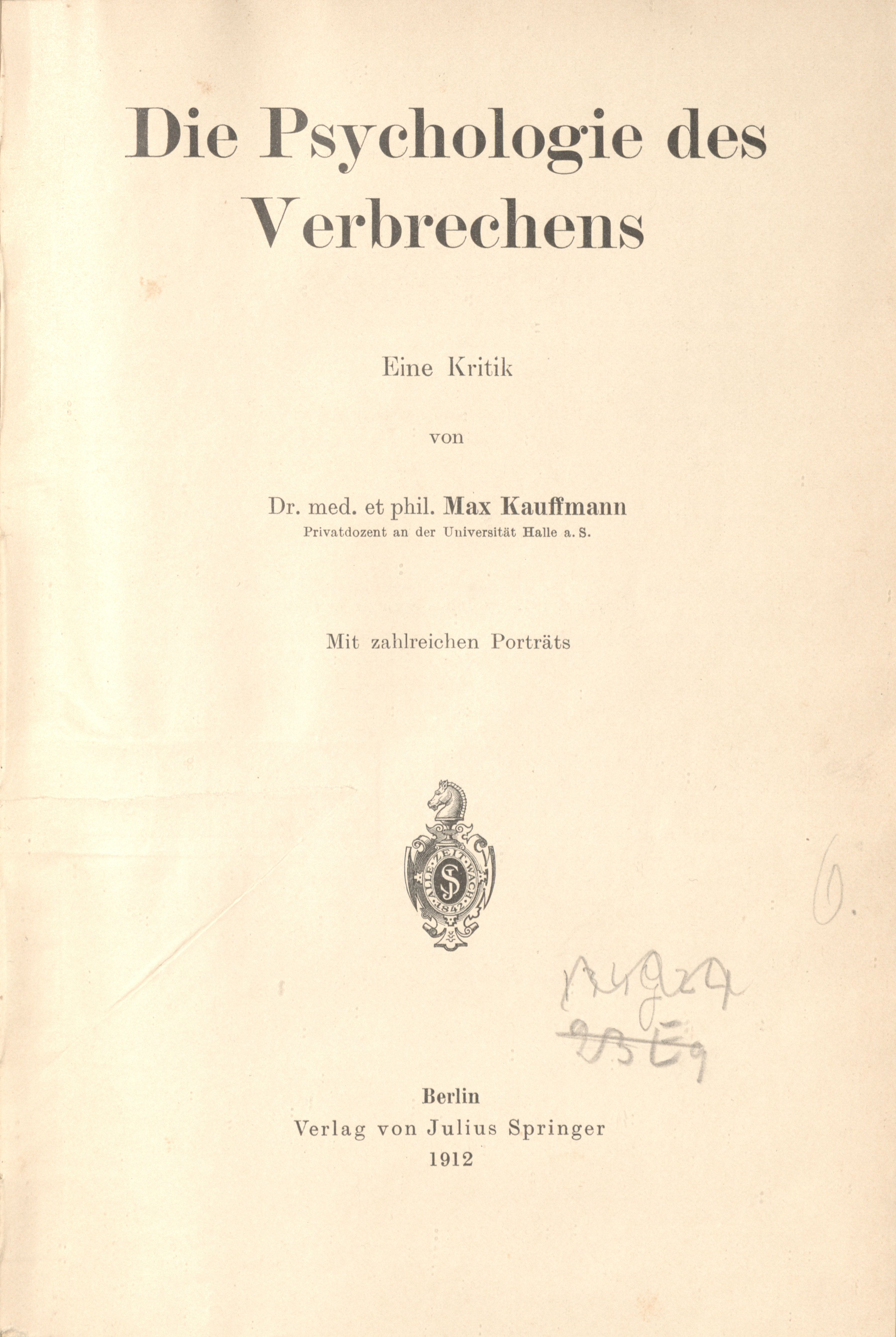
- Title page
- Author: Max Kauffmann
- Language: German
- Publisher: J. Springer
- Publication date: 1912

Die Psychologie des Verbrechens - eine Kritik (English: The Psychology of Crime - a Criticism) is a 1912 German book by Max Kauffmann.

== Contents ==
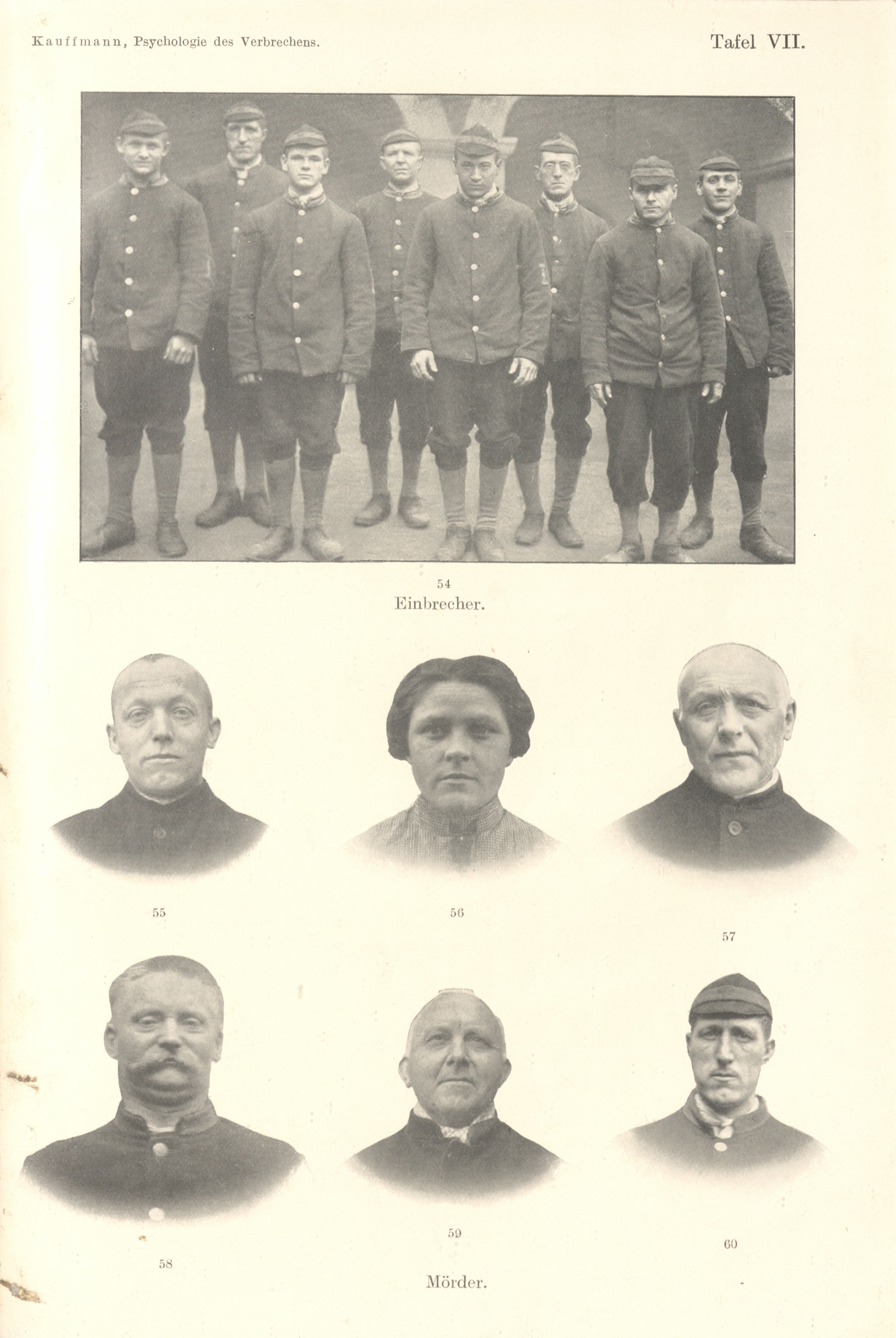
Page from the book

In the first chapter of the book, Kauffmann expresses his idea that misconceptions of crimes are cause by the means of how people study crime and proposes methods to properly learn crime and point out where people get crime wrong while studying it.

The second chapter focuses on the types of crime as Kauffmann tries to categorize each of them. He talks about the psychology, mental, physical, and social characteristics of crimes such as prostitution, alcohol abuse, and abuse of power made by elites. The third chapter takes about the causes of the crimes.

In the final chapter, Kauffmann discusses the penal law, prevention of crime, and ways to fix how criminals are punished for their crimes.

== See also ==
- Die Psychologie des Verbrechers
