= Champion House =

BBC television drama series

- Genre: Drama
- Created by: Hazel Adair; Peter Ling
- Starring: Edward Chapman; Nicole Maurey; Maurice Kaufmann; Virginia Stride
- Country of origin: United Kingdom
- Original language: English
- No. of series: 2
- No. of episodes: 30

Production
- Running time: 50 minutes

Original release
- Network: BBC1
- Release: 28 May 1967 – 4 July 1968

Champion House is a BBC television drama series created by Hazel Adair and Peter Ling, who had previously devised Compact and Crossroads.

The series dealt with the Yorkshire-based Champion family and the dramas surrounding the family textiles firm Champion Mills. Two series were made between 1967 and 1968. The cast included Edward Chapman, Nicole Maurey, Pamela Manson, Maurice Kaufmann and Virginia Stride.

The series was a casualty of the BBC's wiping policy of the era and none of the 30 episodes is known to have survived.

== Cast ==
- Edward Chapman as Joe Champion
- Virginia Stride as Liz Champion
- Nicole Maurey as Michele Champion
- Maurice Kaufmann as Edward Champion
- James Kerry as Stephen Champion
- Penny Reid as Sophie
- Michael Hawkins as Larry Grant
- Pamela Manson as Mrs. Lloyd
- Michael Beint as Reg Prentice
- Arthur Brough as Reg Hapsley
- Alan Gifford as Robert Shadwell
- David Ellison as Fred Richards
- Denis Carey as Fred Fairlie
