= On the Margin =

- Created by: Alan Bennett
- Starring: Yvonne Gilan; Madge Hindle; Roland MacLeod; John Sergeant; Virginia Stride
- Country of origin: United Kingdom
- No. of episodes: 6

Production
- Running time: 30 minutes

Original release
- Network: BBC2
- Release: 9 November – 14 December 1966

On the Margin is a British satirical comedy sketch show written and performed by Alan Bennett and a regular cast including John Sergeant, Virginia Stride, Madge Hindle and Yvonne Gilan. Guest performers included John Fortune and Jonathan Miller. The show also featured songs and poems by John Betjeman and Philip Larkin.

Each episode featured a mixture of sketches, some prophesying his later television dramas such as the quasi-soap Streets Ahead: Life and Times in NW1 (about an upwardly mobile Camden couple) and more unexpectedly, serious poetry and music slots incorporating readings by Michael Hordern and Prunella Scales with archive footage of music-hall stars. This personalised nostalgic element distinguished On the Margin from other contemporary sketch shows, with Bennett's satirical swipes at Britain, integrated with his genuine love of its cultural heritage.

It was directed by Sydney Lotterby, produced by Patrick Garland and was broadcast between 9 November and 14 December 1966 on BBC 2. It was repeated twice in 1967, including a screening on BBC 1, but the tapes were wiped due to the BBC policy at the time of reusing videotape in order to save costs. However, a compilation CD of audio extracts was released in 2009, and in 2014 it was announced that audio copies of the entire series had been located.

The series was cited by John Cleese as an influence on Monty Python's Flying Circus.
