= Bodle Street Green =

Village in East Sussex, England

Coordinates: 50.9064°N 0.3465°E

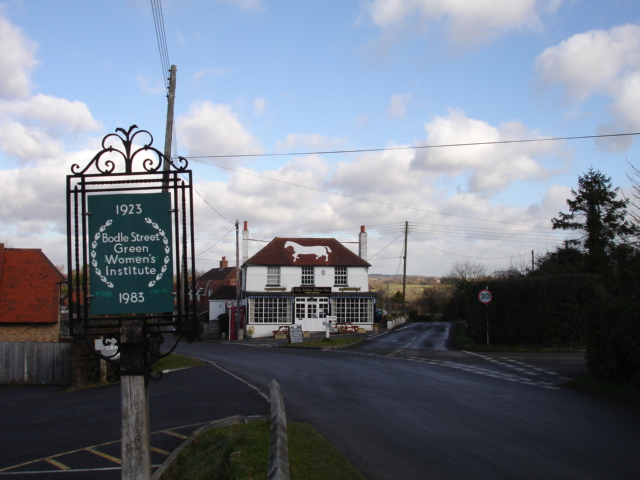

- Location within East Sussex
- OS grid reference: TQ6534513799
- Civil parish: Warbleton
- District: Wealden
- Shire county: East Sussex
- Region: South East
- Country: England
- Sovereign state: United Kingdom
- Post town: HAILSHAM
- Postcode district: BN27 4
- Dialling code: 01323
- Police: Sussex
- Fire: East Sussex
- Ambulance: South East Coast
- UK Parliament: Wealden

Bodle Street Green is a small village in the civil parish of Warbleton, in the Wealden district of East Sussex, England. Its nearest town is Hailsham, which lies approximately 5 miles (8.0 km) south-west from the village.

The village pub (pictured above) is The White Horse Inn, established in around 1820. In August of 2025 it was awarded South East Sussex Country Pub of the Year by CAMRA
