= The Shadow of the Tower =

Television drama

- Genre: Historical
- Written by: Rosemary Anne Sisson; Hugh Whitemore; Julian Mitchell
- Directed by: Prudence Fitzgerald; Moira Armstrong; Anthea Browne-Wilkinson; Joan Kemp-Welch
- Starring: James Maxwell; Norma West
- Composer: Herbert Chappell
- Country of origin: United Kingdom
- Original language: English
- No. of series: 1
- No. of episodes: 13

Production
- Production company: BBC

Original release
- Network: BBC 2
- Release: 6 January – 30 March 1972

The Shadow of the Tower is a historical drama that was broadcast on BBC2 in 1972. It was a prequel to the earlier serials The Six Wives of Henry VIII and Elizabeth R and featured several actors who had appeared in them (but in new roles). Consisting of thirteen episodes, it focused on the reign of Henry VII of England and the creation of the Tudor dynasty.

== Cast ==
Actor/Actress	Role
James Maxwell	King Henry VII
Norma West	Elizabeth of York
Marigold Sharman	Margaret Beaufort
Derek Anders	James IV
Adrienne Byrne	Catherine of Aragon
Denis Carey	Cardinal Morton
John Franklyn-Robbins	Sir William Stanley
Gawn Grainger	Earl of Kildare
Colin Jeavons	Sir Robert Clifford
Michael Johnson	Lord Lovell
Jason Kemp (previously credited as) Anthony Kemp	Prince Arthur
Rachel Kempson	Margaret of York
James Laurenson	Earl of Lincoln
Hayward Morse	Thomas Atwood
Christopher Neame	Earl of Warwick (as adult)
Jake Robson	Earl of Warwick (as boy)
Maurice Roëves	Humphrey Stafford
John Hamill	Thomas Stafford
Nicholas Selby	Earl of Devon
Richard Warwick	Perkin Warbeck
Joanna Tope	Cicely
Gary Warren	Lambert Simnel
Brian Badcoe	Jasper Tudor, Earl of Pembroke
John Bennett	De Puebla
Peter Hawkins, Kevin Moody, Denis Cleary	Voices

== Episodes ==
No.	Title	Directed by	Written by	Original release date
1	"Crown in Jeopardy"	Anthea Browne-Wilkinson	Rosemary Anne Sisson	6 January 1972
Henry Tudor emerges victorious over Richard III at the battle of Bosworth Field and seeks to form a coalition from which he hopes to establish a Tudor dynasty.
2	"Power in the Land"	Anthea Browne-Wilkinson	Rosemary Anne Sisson	13 January 1972
Henry consolidates his power when Elizabeth gives birth to Prince Arthur legitimizing Henry's claim of descent from the legendary monarch.
3	"The Schooling of Apes"	Prudence Fitzgerald	Brian Rawlinson	20 January 1972
Henry's enemies represent commoner Lambert Simnel as the Earl of Warwick, the York pretender. The Earl of Lincoln leaves for Ireland to head the army that is forming against Henry.
4	"The Crowning of Apes"	Prudence Fitzgerald	Brian Rawlinson	27 January 1972
Henry forms an army to defend himself against the Irish-German army coming against him from Ireland.
5	"The Serpent and the Comforter"	Moira Armstrong	Hugh Whitemore	3 February 1972
King Henry is intrigued by a preacher who is arrested for heresy and speaks with him to persuade him to give up his dissension against the practices of the Catholic Church. The preacher emphasizes to him the simplicity of the Gospel, and his suffering and convictions impress a young Tower guard.
6	"The White Hart"	Moira Armstrong	John Elliot	10 February 1972
The year is 1494 and King Henry is alarmed that the powerful and arrogant Sir William Stanley may be implicated in a plot against his crown.
7	"A Fly in the Ointment"	Moira Armstrong	Julian Mitchell	17 February 1972
Addle-brained Sir John Kendall and his dim-witted nephew devise a ludicrous plan to kill the King with a harmless ointment from phony astrologer.
8	"The Princely Gift"	Keith Williams	Alun Richards	24 February 1972
Visionary Italian navigator John Cabot has a difficult time convincing Bristol businessmen and the King that his Western voyage to China is practical and profitable.
9	"Do the Sheep Sin?"	Prudence Fitzgerald	John Gould	2 March 1972
Heavy-handed tax policies lead the peasants of Cornwall to march peacefully in protest on London, but an ambitions nobleman wants to use the pilgrimage to his own advantage.
10	"The Man Who Never Was"	Darrol Blake	Julian Mitchell	9 March 1972
Commoner Perkin Warbeck, pretender to Henry's throne, finds he's losing support throughout Europe.
11	"The Strange Shapes of Reality"	Prudence Fitzgerald	Hugh Whitemore	16 March 1972
Although Perkin Warbeck enjoys only house arrest for his treason through Henry's mercy, he continues to plot against the King.
12	"The Fledgling"	Joan Kemp-Welch	John Peacock	23 March 1972
In order to give his dynasty more credibility, Henry tries to arrange a marriage between his son and the Spanish princess, but there are preconditions.
13	"The King without a Face"	Peter Moffatt	Ian Thorne	30 March 1972
The year is now 1501 and Henry is now finally secure on the throne with his promising son Arthur about to marry Catherine of Aragon, however in the shadows tragic events are lying in wait for the King.
