= Derek Anders =

Scottish television actor

Derek Anders is a Scottish television actor. He was active from 1970 to 1996.

Roles include James IV of Scotland in The Shadow of the Tower, Long Rob Duncan in Sunset Song, David Blair in Take the High Road, and a minister in Rab C. Nesbitt.
