= Peter Ling =

English television, radio, and comic strip author (1926–2006)

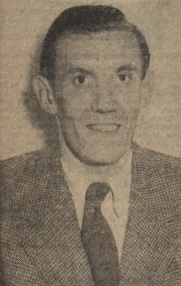
- Ling in 1953
- Born: Peter George Derek Ling; 27 May 1926; Thornton Heath, Croydon, Surrey, England
- Died: 14 September 2006 (aged 80); Hastings, East Sussex, England
- Occupations: Screenwriter; radio writer; comic strip writer; soap opera creator; novelist; songwriter

Peter George Derek Ling (27 May 1926 – 14 September 2006) was an English writer of television, radio and comic strips, best known for his television work. With his professional partner, Hazel Adair, he co-created the television soap opera Crossroads.

== Early life ==
Ling was born in Thornton Heath, the son of a stage magician and a teacher, and was educated at Whitgift School. As a child he appeared in the Radio Luxembourg children's show The Ovaltinies, and wrote an article for Good Housekeeping magazine at the age of 14.

He was conscripted to work in the coal mines as a "Bevin Boy" during the Second World War, but was transferred to the Army Pay Corps due to ill-health. After the war, recovering from tuberculosis in a British Legion Sanatorium, he published his first novel, Voices Offstage (1947), and began submitting comedy scripts to BBC radio, selling some to Jon Pertwee's radio show Waterlogged Spa. This led to work on television, including the BBC's children's show Whirligig (1950), where he met actress Sheilah Ward, whom he married in 1954.

== Writing ==
In 1952 he was invited to write comic strips for the Eagle, including the schoolboy series "The Three J's", illustrated by artist Peter Kay (1953–59), which was adapted for television in 1958. With Ward, he also co-wrote strips for Eagle's sister title Girl, including Two Pairs of Skates (1956–57) and Penny Starr (1957). The couple also wrote a Girl spin-off novel, Angela has Wings, based on the comic strip Angela Air Hostess, created by Betty Roland.

In 1955 he joined Associated-Rediffusion as script editor, working on shows including Murder Bag, Crime Sheet and Jango, and was later appointed Head of Children's Series. He and Hazel Adair co-wrote Compact, a soap set in magazine publishing, for the BBC from 1962 to 1965. The two writers followed this up with Crossroads, a soap set in a motel, which began on ITV in 1964; the format's principal run lasted until 1988. The writing partners followed it with Champion House, a Yorkshire family saga set in the textiles industry, shown on the BBC from 1967 to 1968. Ling wrote for Dixon of Dock Green, Sexton Blake, No Hiding Place, Doctor Who (The Mind Robber in 1968), and, with Sheilah Ward, The Avengers ("Ashes of Roses", "Dance with Death", and "Box of Tricks").

He continued to write for radio, including adaptations of Sherlock Holmes and Gideon Fell stories and the Arnold Bennett novel Imperial Palace, and wrote scripts for the Radio 2 soap Waggoner's Walk in 1969.

=== Novels and songs ===
He published several novels, including the novelisation of his Doctor Who serial "The Mind Robber" for Target Books; three novels in the "Crown House" series, Crown House (1988), Crown Papers (1989) and Crown Wars (1996); three in the "Docklands Saga" or "Watermen" series, High Water (1991), Flood Water (1992) and Storm Water (1993); two stand-alone novels, Halfway to Heaven (1994) and Happy Tomorrow (1995); and bodice-rippers under the name Petra Lee. He also wrote songs, including "Why Not Now?", which was a hit for Matt Monro in 1961.

== Death ==
He died on 14 September 2006 after suffering from Alzheimer's disease for some years.
