= Charles Buckman Goring =

British criminologist (1870–1919)

- Born: 31 January 1870; Penge, Surrey, England
- Died: 5 May 1919 (aged 49); Manchester, Lancashire, England
- Education: University of London, B.Sc. M.D.
- Occupation: Criminologist
- Notable work: The English Convict: a statistical study
- Awards: Weldon Memorial Prize (1914)

Charles Buckman Goring (1870–1919) was a pioneer in criminology and author of the influential work The English Convict: a statistical study.

== Life ==
He married Katie Winifred Macdonald, a pianist and suffragette, in Paris in 1905. They had two sons, Charles Donald Austin Goring (known as Donald) who died in a motor vehicle accident in Yemen in 1936 and Marius Goring, the stage and screen actor.

He died on 5 May 1919 at his home in Cheetham Hill, Manchester from influenza. He was the Chief Medical Officer at HM Prison Manchester (Strangeways) at the time of his death.

He was highly regarded among those who knew him. His colleague Karl Pearson once said: "The creative mind has the potentiality of poet, artist and scientist within its grasp, and Goring's friends were never very certain in which category to place him."

== The English Convict ==
Goring's crowning achievement was The English Convict: A Statistical Study, one of the most comprehensive criminological works of its time. It was first published in 1913, and set out to establish whether there were any significant physical or mental abnormalities among the criminal classes that set them apart from ordinary men, as suggested by Cesare Lombroso. Under the sponsorship of the British government, Goring, assisted by other prison medical officers, as well as Karl Pearson and his staff at the Biometrics Laboratory, collected and analysed data bearing upon 96 traits of each of over 3,000 English convicts. He ultimately concluded that "the physical and mental constitution of both criminal and law-abiding persons, of the same age, stature, class, and intelligence, are identical. There is no such thing as an anthropological criminal type."

He did, however, assert that it is an "indisputable fact that there is a physical, mental, and moral type of normal person who tends to be convicted of crime: that is to say, our evidence conclusively shows that, on average, the criminal of English prisons is markedly differentiated by defective physique - as measured by stature and body weight, by defective mental capacity". Goring went on to argue that one of the three measures in which to combat crime was to "regulate the reproduction of those degrees of constitutional qualities - feeble-minded, inebriety, epilepsy, social instinct, etc".
