= Compact (TV series) =

British TV soap (1962–1965)

- Genre: Drama
- Created by: Hazel Adair; Peter Ling
- Starring: Johnnie Wade; Frances Bennett; Robert Desmond; Vincent Ball; Beryl Cooke; Ronald Allen; Jackie Lane; Penelope Keith; Moray Watson; Naomi Chance
- Theme music composer: Roger Roger (City Movement, 1960)
- Country of origin: United Kingdom
- Original language: English
- No. of episodes: 373

Production
- Running time: 30 minutes

Original release
- Network: BBC1
- Release: 2 January 1962 – 30 July 1965

Compact is a British television soap opera shown by BBC Television from January 1962 to July 1965, created by Hazel Adair and Peter Ling.

== Production and release ==
The idea came to Hazel Adair when she submitted a commissioned feature article for Woman's Own. Adair and Ling devised the long-running soap Crossroads while Compact was still running.

In contrast to the kitchen sink realism of Coronation Street, Compact was a distinctly middle-class serial, set in the more "sophisticated" arena of magazine publishing. The show took viewers into the office, and aligned the professional lives of the characters with more personal storylines. The show was scheduled for broadcast on Tuesdays and Thursdays, thus avoiding a clash with ITV's Coronation Street on Mondays and Wednesdays.

After the BBC decided to produce the project, she formed a working partnership with Peter Ling. When Compact began, the editor was female, Joanne Minster (Jean Harvey); she was replaced after the first six months by Ian Harmon (Ronald Allen), the son of the magazine's owner. Compact featured the first regular Black character in a British soap opera, photographer Jeff Armandez (Horace James), who appeared in 26 episodes from August to October 1964. Adair managed to persuade the BBC to retain an unmarried mother in the series (also a first), according to her granddaughter.

In 1964 a regular omnibus edition was introduced, broadcast on Sundays. Morris Barry, actor and BBC director – he directed three Doctor Who stories in the 1960s – took over as producer and was given a brief to spice the series up in view of the criticism it had received from the national press. The BBC dropped the series in 1965. Adair believed the BBC was embarrassed by its high audience figures.

Only four out of 373 televised episodes exist in the BBC archive. (See Wiping.)

== Reception ==
Despite being criticised by reviewers, Compact was a success.

== Cast ==
- Johnnie Wade
- Frances Bennett
- Robert Desmond
- Vincent Ball
- Beryl Cooke
- Ronald Allen
- Jackie Lane
- Penelope Keith
- Moray Watson
- Naomi Chance
- Jan Miller
- Johnnie Wade

When the series ended, several cast members appeared in similar programmes. Ronald Allen was a regular in the soap opera Crossroads between 1969 and 1985. Australian actor Vincent Ball also featured in Crossroads. Marcia Ashton, who played Lily, appeared in soap opera Brookside many years later. Carmen Silvera played Madame Edith Artois in the sitcom 'Allo 'Allo! from 1982 to 1992. One of the directors, David Giles, for whom Compact was his first television assignment, had an extensive career in the medium.
