= Hazel Adair (screenwriter) =

English actress and screenwriter (1920–2015)

- Born: Hazel Joyce Willett; 9 July 1920; Darjeeling, British India
- Died: 22 November 2015 (aged 95); Reading, Berkshire, England
- Occupations: Actress; screenwriter; radio writer; soap opera creator
- Spouse(s): Gordon Mackenzie (m. 1940; div. 1949) Ronald Marriott (m. 1950; died 1972)
- Children: 6
- Writing career
- Pen name: Hazel Adair; Claire Nicol
- Language: English language

Hazel Joyce Marriott (née Willett; 9 July 1920 – 22 November 2015), known professionally as Hazel Adair, was a British actress turned screenwriter and creator of soap operas for radio and television. She is best known for co-creating Crossroads with Peter Ling.

== Early life and career ==
Hazel Joyce Willett was born in 1920 at Darjeeling, British India, daughter of Ada "Alma" (Rhames) and Edward Willett, an engineer who worked in Calcutta. At 9 months old, her English family returned to England, where her parents divorced in 1923 when she was two years old. Her mother later married Edward Hamblin, and she adopted his surname. In 1940, Hazel wed Gordon Mackenzie, a rancher from Brazil. The couple had one son Colin, after WWII her husband returned to Brazil and they divorced in 1949. In 1950, Hazel married Ronald Marriott, an actor-writer, who died in 1972, and with whom she had 5 children.

Using Adair as her stage name, she began her career as an actress with parts in the film My Brother Jonathan (1948) and the BBC television drama Lady Precious Stream (1950), originally a stage play by the British Chinese writer Hsiung Shih-I.

She then turned her attention to writing scripts for radio and television. Together with her second husband, Ronald Marriott, she wrote Stranger from Space (1951-52), an episodic serial for the Whirligig children's television series.

With Jonquil Antony (later Peter Ling), she wrote scripts for the radio soap opera Mrs Dale's Diary, and with Antony co-created ITV's first soap, Sixpenny Corner, which ran for eight months during 1955 and 1956, five days a week in a 15-minute slot.

== Soap operas ==
She formed a professional relationship with Peter Ling. The partnership created Compact (1962–5), based on her experiences working for Woman's Own, and the long-running Crossroads series.

She recalled a working lunch with ATV head Lew Grade in August 1964 in which he requested the creation of a daily soap opera to be built around Noele Gordon, then in her mid-40s and under contract, to run from the following October. Adair and Ling quickly came up with the format, based around a widow, Meg Richardson, and her motel business. Despite limited production values, it became a hit, although a secondary storyline around the village shop of Richardson's sister was soon eliminated. Initially only screened in the Midland ATV franchise area from November, it was eventually taken up by the entire ITV network, and continued (in its original run) until 1988, although Adair's direct involvement lasted only until the mid-1970s.

With Ling, she wrote for programmes such as Champion House (1967–68), which they also created, and for Doctor Who; the script by Adair and Ling for the latter was only produced as an audio drama decades later. As a script writer on Emergency – Ward 10, she wrote what was long thought to be the first interracial kiss on television in Britain, broadcast in June 1964, but this has been found to be incorrect.

Her other work, Compact, featured the first black actor to appear regularly (Horace James between August and October 1964) and the earliest unmarried mother in a soap, while Crossroads had the first black family to be included in the regular cast of a British soap.

== Other work ==
She had an intermittent career in the film industry. She wrote the script for Life in Emergency Ward 10 (1958), a spin-off film for which she was credited with the series' creator Tessa Diamond, and the Bob Monkhouse movie Dentist on the Job (1961) (with Hugh Woodhouse). In the 1970s she formed Pyramid Films with the broadcaster on wrestling, Kent Walton, with both adopting a joint pen name as the writers of the scripts. The company ventured into producing erotic films such as Virgin Witch (1971), Clinic Exclusive (1971) and Keep It Up Downstairs (1976).

She drew on her experiences as an ambulance driver during second world war for a work of romantic fiction, Blitz on Balaclava Street (1983), published under the pseudonym of Clare Nicol. Adair was joint head of the Writer's Guild with Denis Norden and called a six-week strike in the 1960s, which eventually led Lew Grade agreeing to minimum wages and royalties for scriptwriters.

== Death ==
She died in Reading, Berkshire, on 22 November 2015, at the age of 95. She was survived by her six children, 11 grandchildren and 8 great-grandchildren.
