= Norma West =

British actress (born 1943)

- Born: 19 November 1943 (age 82); Cape Town, South Africa
- Occupation: actress

Norma West (born 19 November 1943) is a British actress. Born in Cape Town, South Africa, her best known television appearance was as Queen Elizabeth of York in the BBC series The Shadow of the Tower (1972). She played the part of Number 6's observer in the Patrick McGoohan's surreal, spy series The Prisoner ("Dance of the Dead", 1967). She also had roles in the TV programmes Danger Man, Mr. Rose, Ace of Wands, Crown Court (TV series) ('One for the Road'), A Touch of Frost, Lovejoy, The Ruth Rendell Mysteries. Other television roles included Lady Killers (1981), The Case-Book of Sherlock Holmes feature length episode The Master Blackmailer (1992) as Lady Diana Swinstead, and an adaptation in the Miss Marple series, The Murder at the Vicarage (1986) with Joan Hickson. She played Hilary in the television adaptation of John le Carré's Smiley's People (1982) and the role of Wilhelmina Lawson in Agatha Christie's Poirot - Dumb Witness (1996).

Her film career included roles in Spaceflight IC-1 (1965), The Projected Man (1967), Battle Beneath the Earth (1967), Run a Crooked Mile (1969), Man at the Top (1973), Why Shoot the Teacher? (1977) and And the Ship Sails On (1983).
