= Warbleton =

Village in East Sussex, England

Coordinates: 50.94068°N 0.28933°E

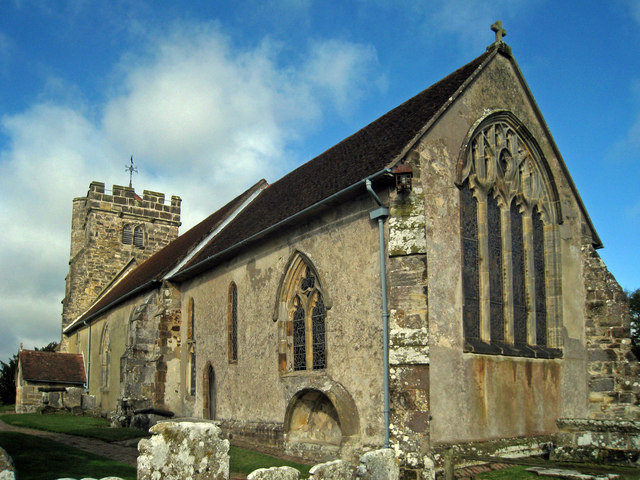
- St Mary's church

- Location within East Sussex
- Area: 29.1 km^{2} (11.2 sq mi)
- Population: 1,375 (2011)
  - Density: 112/sq mi (43/km^{2})
- OS grid reference: TQ605186
  - London: 42 miles (68 km) NNW
- District: Wealden
- Shire county: East Sussex
- Region: South East
- Country: England
- Sovereign state: United Kingdom
- Post town: HEATHFIELD
- Postcode district: TN21
- Dialling code: 01435
- Police: Sussex
- Fire: East Sussex
- Ambulance: South East Coast
- UK Parliament: Bexhill and Battle
- Website: http://www.warbletonparishcouncil.co.uk/community/warbleton-parish-council-18007/home/

Warbleton is a village and civil parish in the Wealden district of East Sussex, England. Within its bounds are three other settlements. It is located south-east of Heathfield on the slopes of the Weald.

== Etymology ==
The place-name Warbleton, derived from the Old English Wǣrburhe tūn, means the farmstead or village of a woman called Wǣrburh. In the Domesday Book (1086) the name is recorded as 'Warborgetone'. It is subsequently recorded as Warberton (1166), Walberton (1340), and Warbleton (1404). Wǣrburh is said to be one of the half-dozen or so women who owned property in the land of the South Saxons.

== History ==
The manor of Warbleton was held by the Levett family of Sussex for several centuries. The same family held Salehurst, and had earlier held Firle, Catsfield, Hollington and other manors across Sussex. The family is of Anglo-Norman descent, and members of the family were vicars, ironmasters, and landowners. The Levetts of Salehurst, Warbleton and Fittleworth owned Bodiam Castle and sold it to Nicholas Tufton, 1st Earl of Thanet. Some of the Levett family's property was forfeited due to the bankruptcy of an early heir, and other lands were carried by marriage into other prominent Sussex and Kent families. Brian Epstein, manager of the Beatles, once owned a house in the parish named Kingsley Hill.

== Governance ==
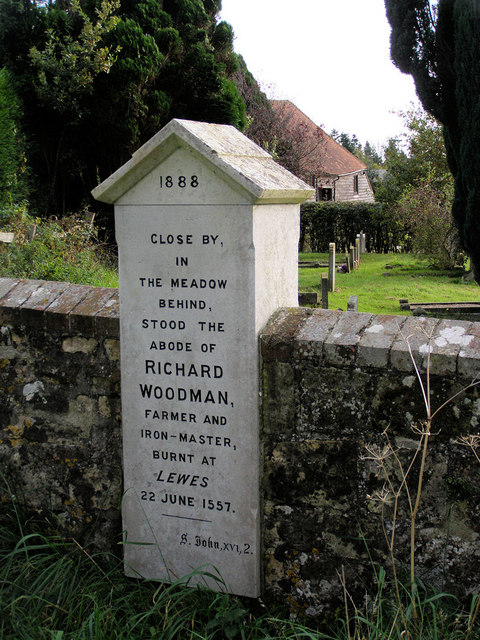
Richard Woodman was a local Ironmaster who was one of the 17 Lewes martyrs burned during the Marian persecutions of Protestants during the 1550s.

The parish council consists of eleven members.

== Geography ==
The parish consists of two villages, Rushlake Green and Bodle Street Green; and two hamlets, Warbleton and Three Cups. They lie in an area of the Weald between the A267 road between Hailsham and Heathfield to the west and the B2096 Hailsham to Battle road to the north.

== Principal buildings ==
There are two churches in the civil parish, St Mary the Virgin at Warbleton; and St John the Evangelist at Bodle Street Green. The two form a united benefice under one vicar. Chapel services are held at Three Cups. Warbleton has a village hall; and a second, Dunn Village Hall, is at Rushlake Green.
