= Rushlake Green =

Village in East Sussex, England

Coordinates: 50.939498°N 0.313135°E

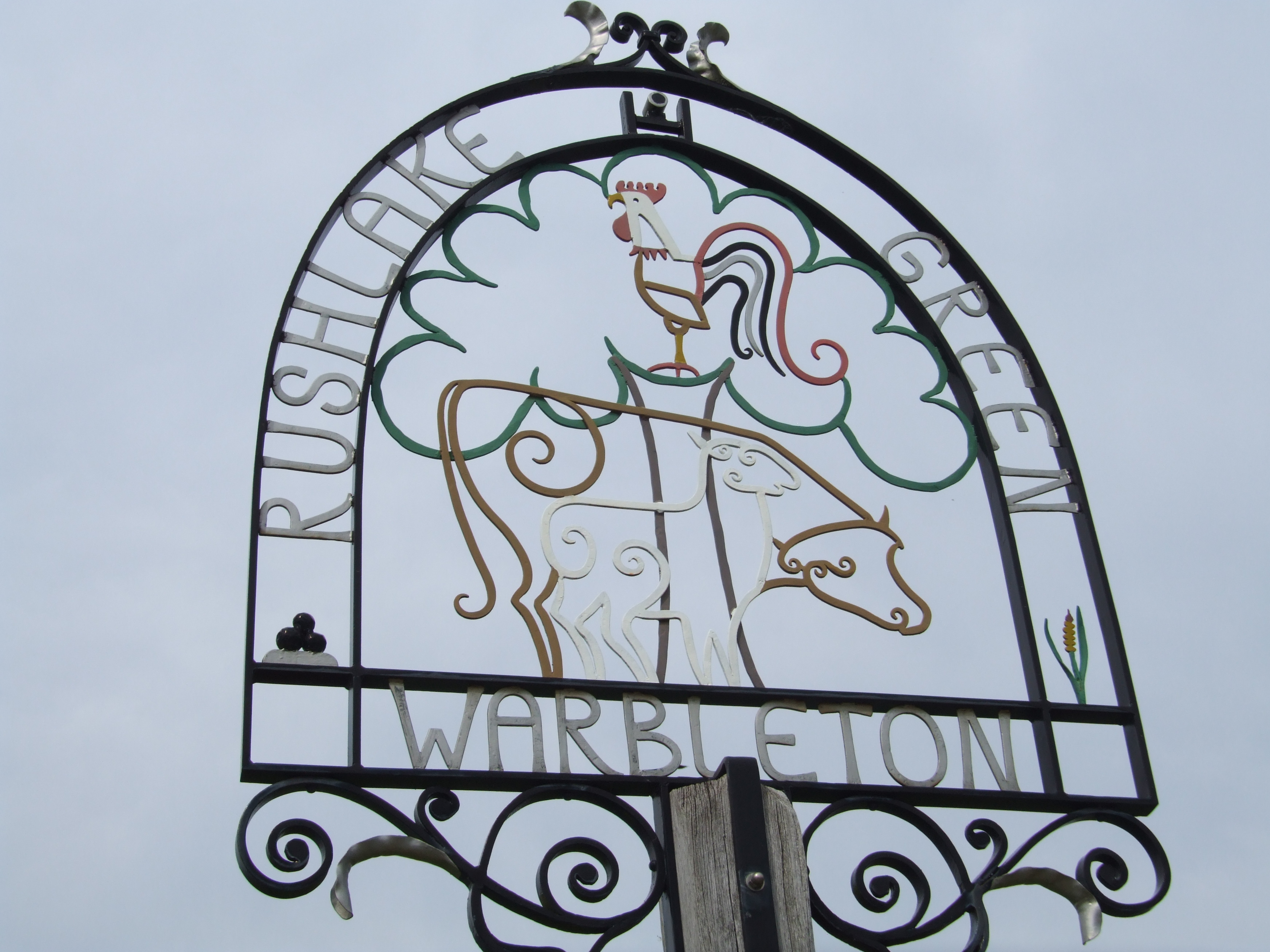
- Rushlake Green village sign

- Location within East Sussex
- OS grid reference: TQ626181
- District: Wealden
- Shire county: East Sussex
- Region: South East
- Country: England
- Sovereign state: United Kingdom
- Post town: HEATHFIELD
- Postcode district: TN21
- Dialling code: 01435
- Police: Sussex
- Fire: East Sussex
- Ambulance: South East Coast
- UK Parliament: Wealden

Rushlake Green is a small village in the civil parish of Warbleton in the Wealden district of East Sussex, England. Rushlake Green is situated on the slopes of the Weald between Heathfield 4 miles (6.4 km) north-west, Battle 9 miles (14 km) south-west and Hailsham 7 miles (11 km) south.

== History ==
The place-name Rushlake Green is derived from the Old English rysc lacu meaning rush watercourse, or watercourse where rushes grow. The name was subsequently recorded as Rysshelake in 1537 and Ruslake grene in 1567. Slightly east of Rushlake Green is a stream flowing into the Ashbourne, which may explain the place-name.

Wealden iron was mined here and at nearby Warbleton in the 16th and 17th centuries.

Earliest records of the village date back to the 16th century although the Grade II Listed Horse and Groom public house and some cottages were built in the 17th century.

== Gallery ==
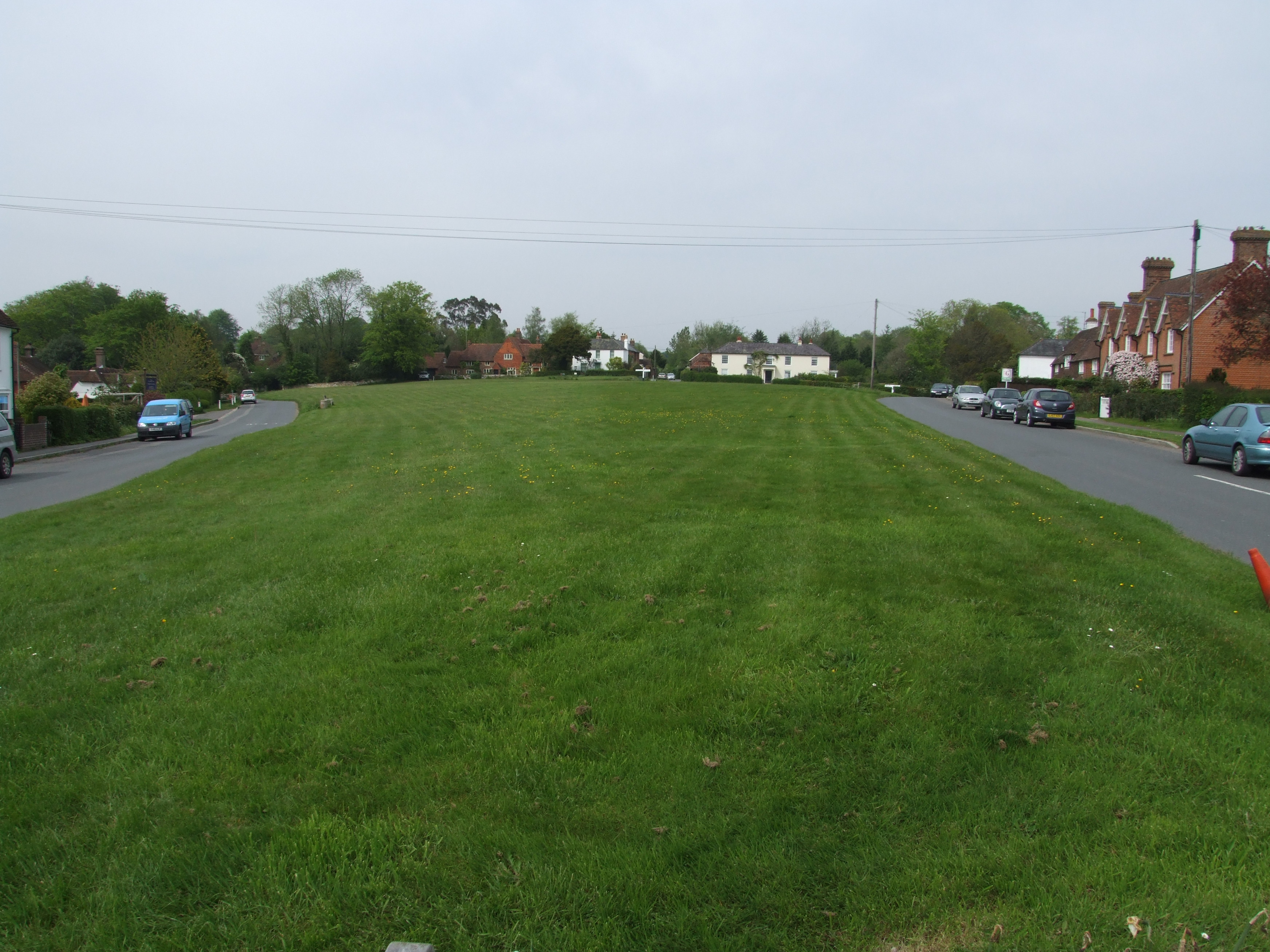
Looking north over the village green.

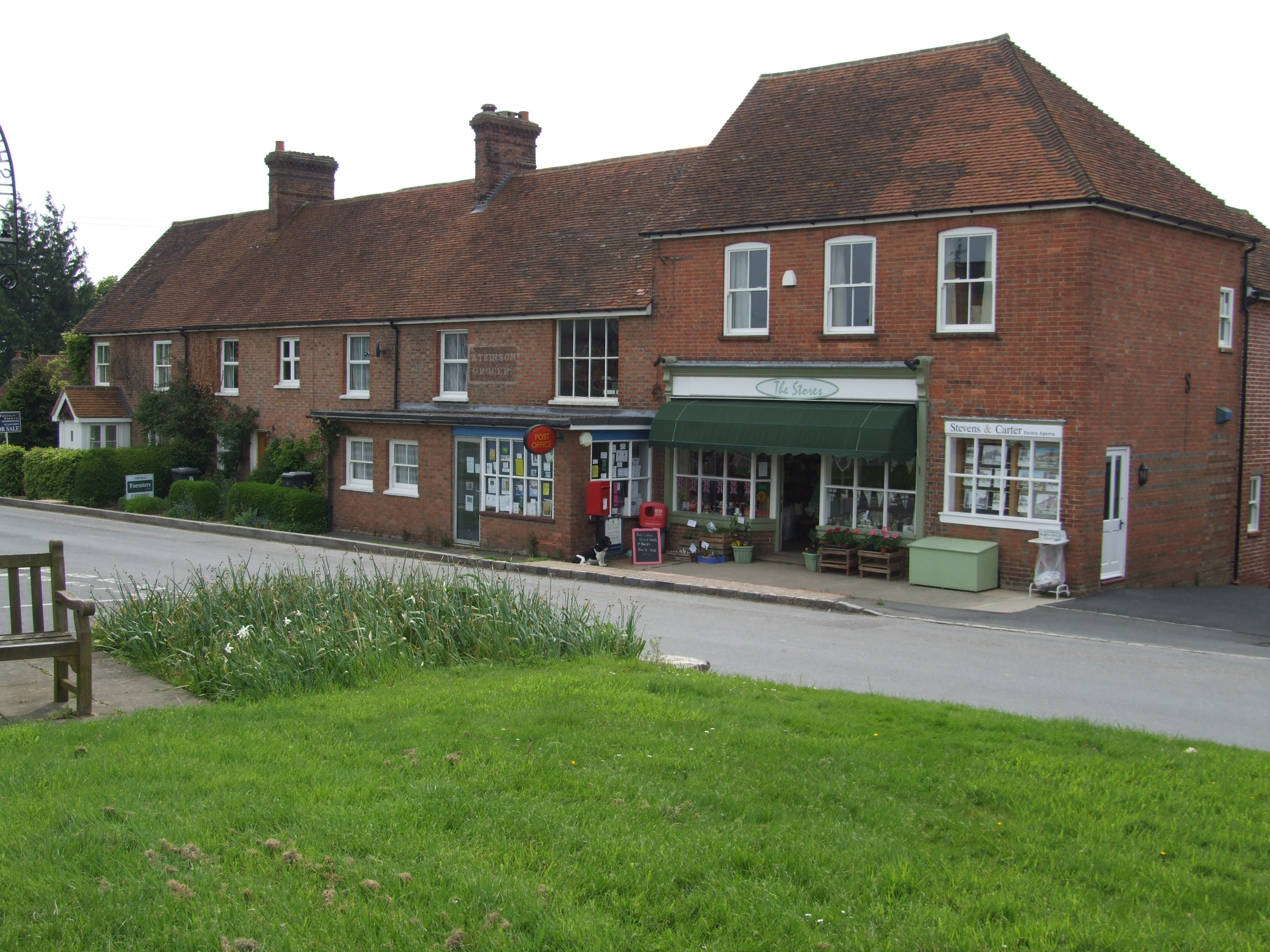
Village shops

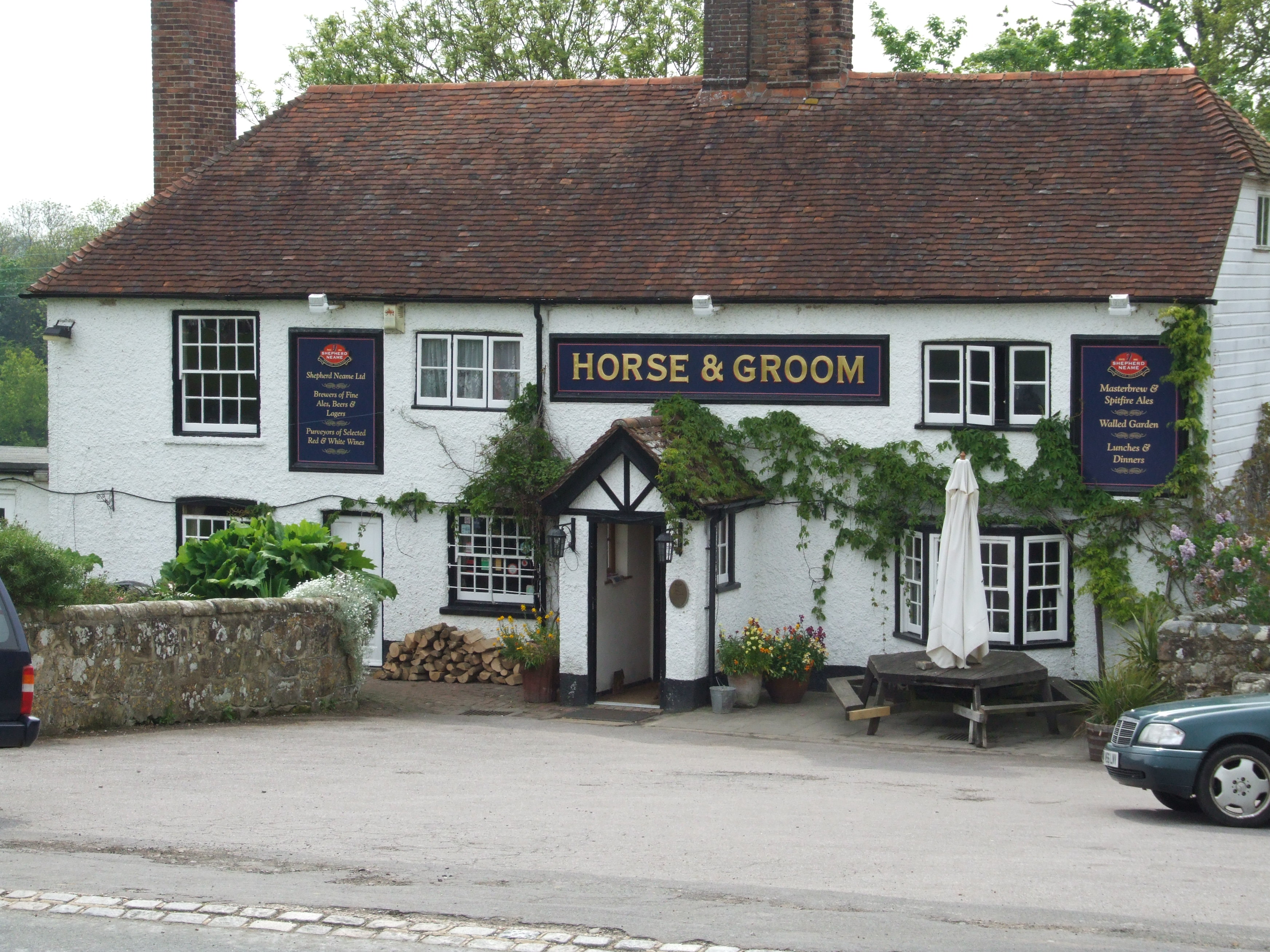
Horse and Groom pub built around 1650

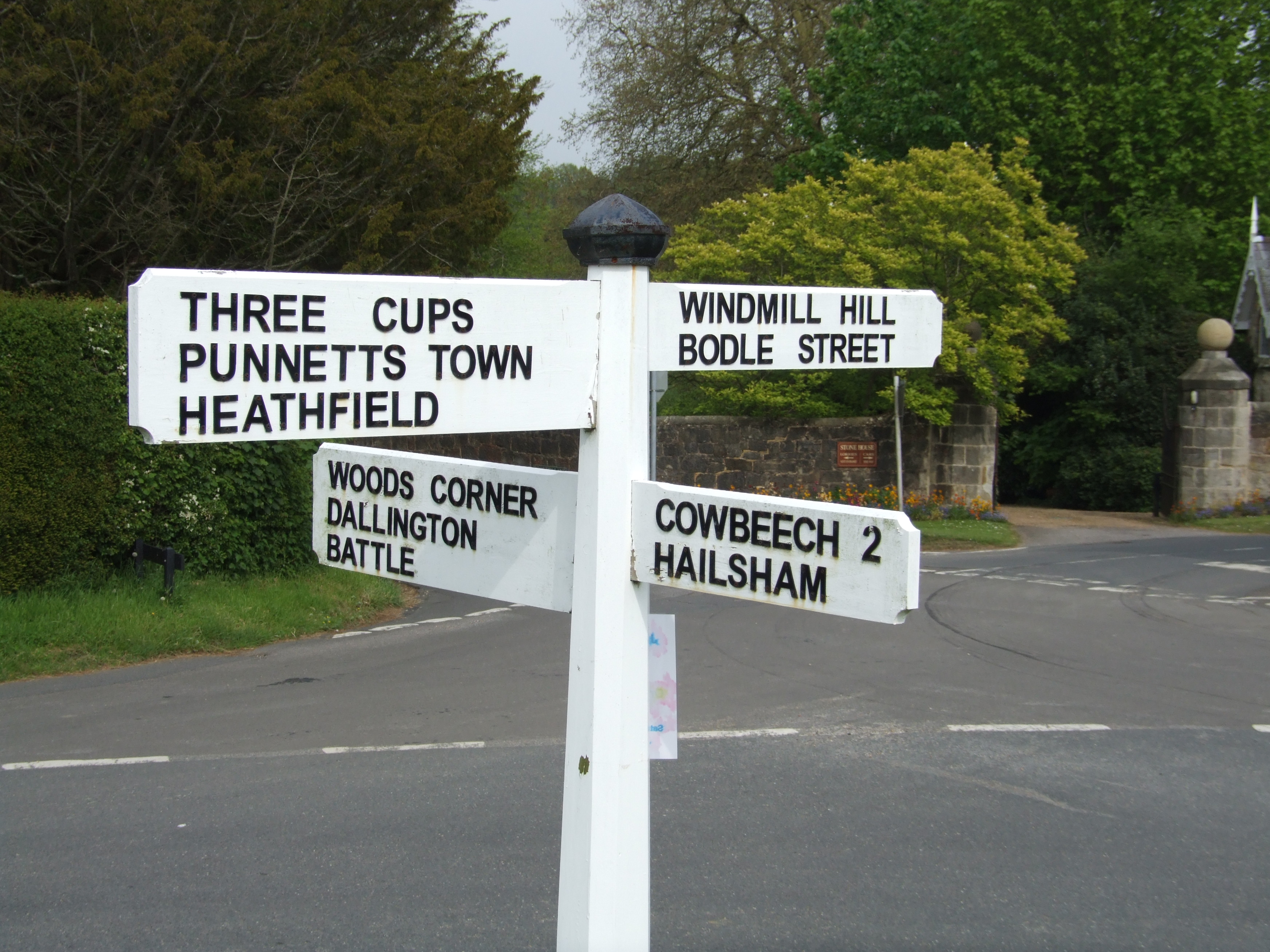
A traditional fingerpost showing nearby places.
