= Rue Brancion =

Street in Paris, France

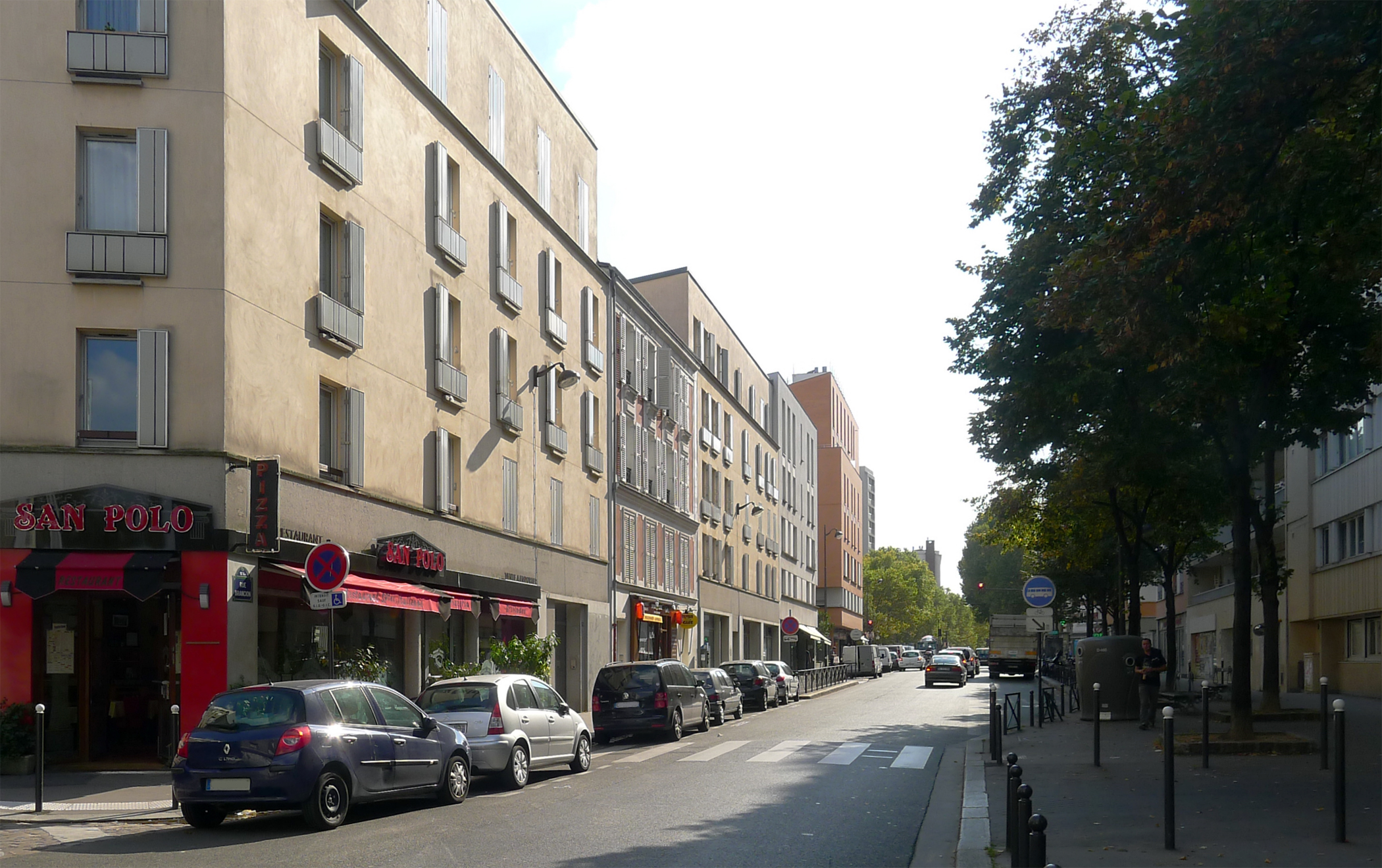
- Looking toward the Boulevard Lefebvre

- Location within Paris
- Length: 910 m (2,990 ft)
- Width: 20 m (66 ft)
- Arrondissement: 15th
- Quarter: Saint-Lambert
- Coordinates: 48°49′58″N 2°18′12″E
- From: 6, Place d'Alleray
- To: 167, Boulevard Lefebvre

Construction
- Denomination: 1864

The Rue Brancion is a street in the Saint-Lambert quarter in the 15th arrondissement of Paris, France.

== Route ==
The Rue Brancion starts at 6, Place d'Alleray and ends at 167, Boulevard Lefebvre.

It forms the eastern boundary of the Parc Georges-Brassens and crosses over the disused tracks of the Petite Ceinture railway line.

== History ==
In 1864, the street was named after Colonel Adolphe-Ernest Raguet de Brancion, who was killed in the Malakoff bastion attack in 1855.

The southern part of the street, between the Rue des Morillons and the Boulevard Lefebvre, was previously known as the Rue du Pont de Turbigo.

The street was extended from the Rue des Morillons to the Rue de Vouillé in 1901, then from the Rue de Vouillé to the Rue d'Alleray in 1906.

== Important and historical buildings ==
- No. 10: headquarters of the chairman of France Télécom, then of the Directorate of Population and Migration (2001–06).
- No. 104: entrance of the former horse market building of the Vaugirard slaughterhouses, at the intersection of the Rue des Morillons and the Rue Brancion; now the Parc Georges-Brassens. Every Saturday and Sunday since 1987, around 50 booksellers gather here for the ancient and second-hand book market.
- In front of this entrance, there are two statues depicting François Barbaud and Émile Decroix.
- A bit further, the entryway leads to the Monfort-Théâtre.
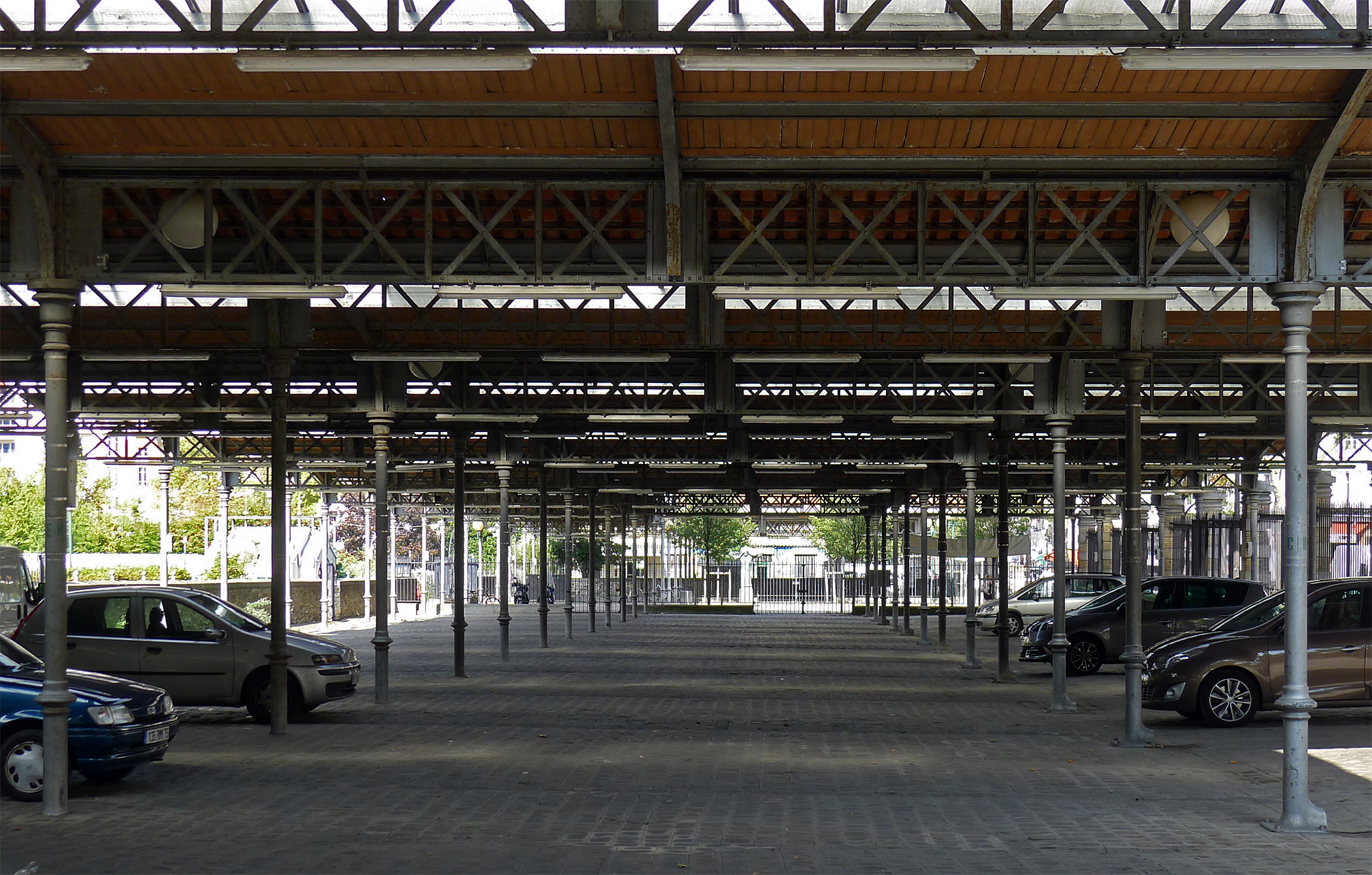
The former horse market building, where the book market takes place every weekend

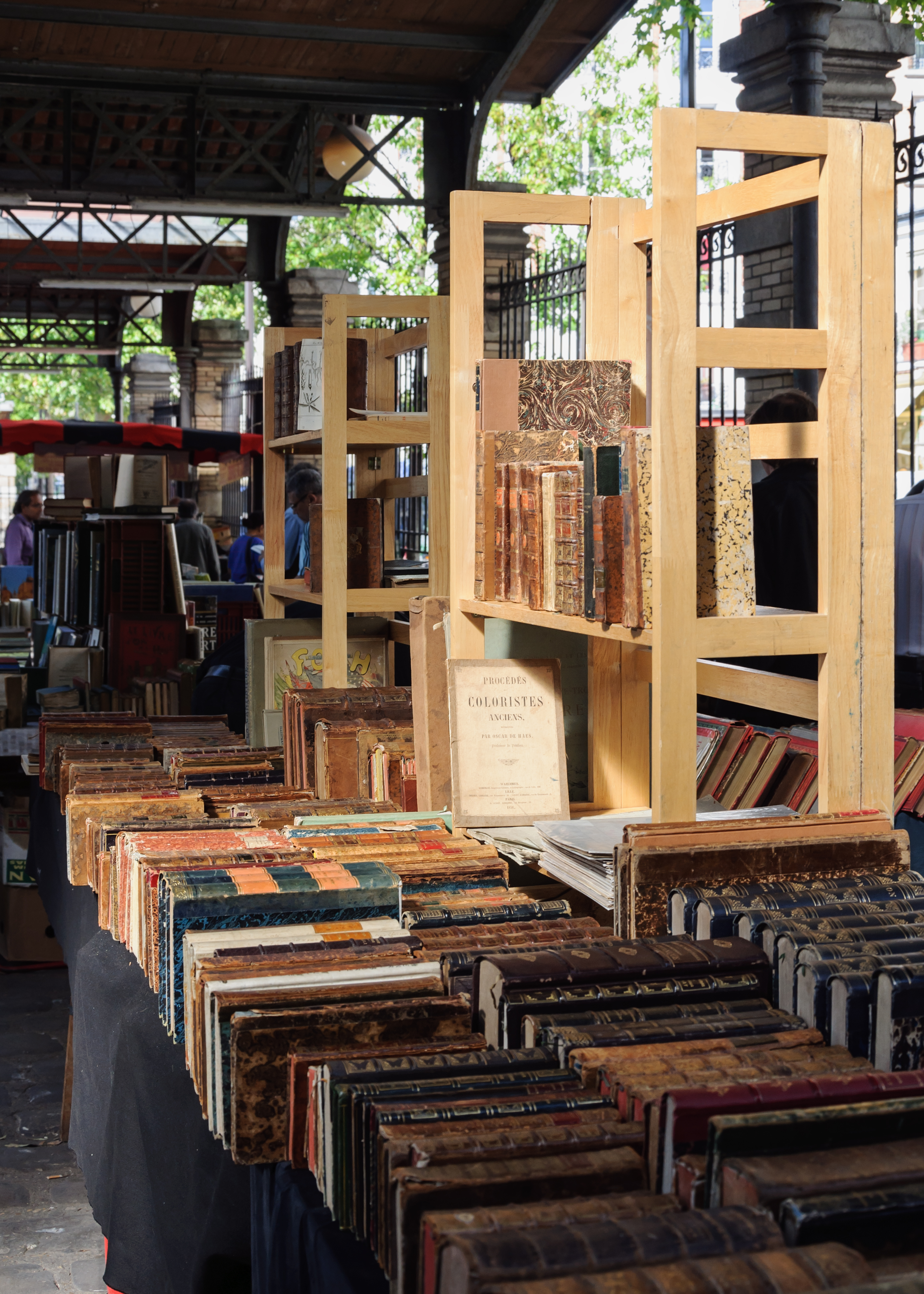
Second-hand book market

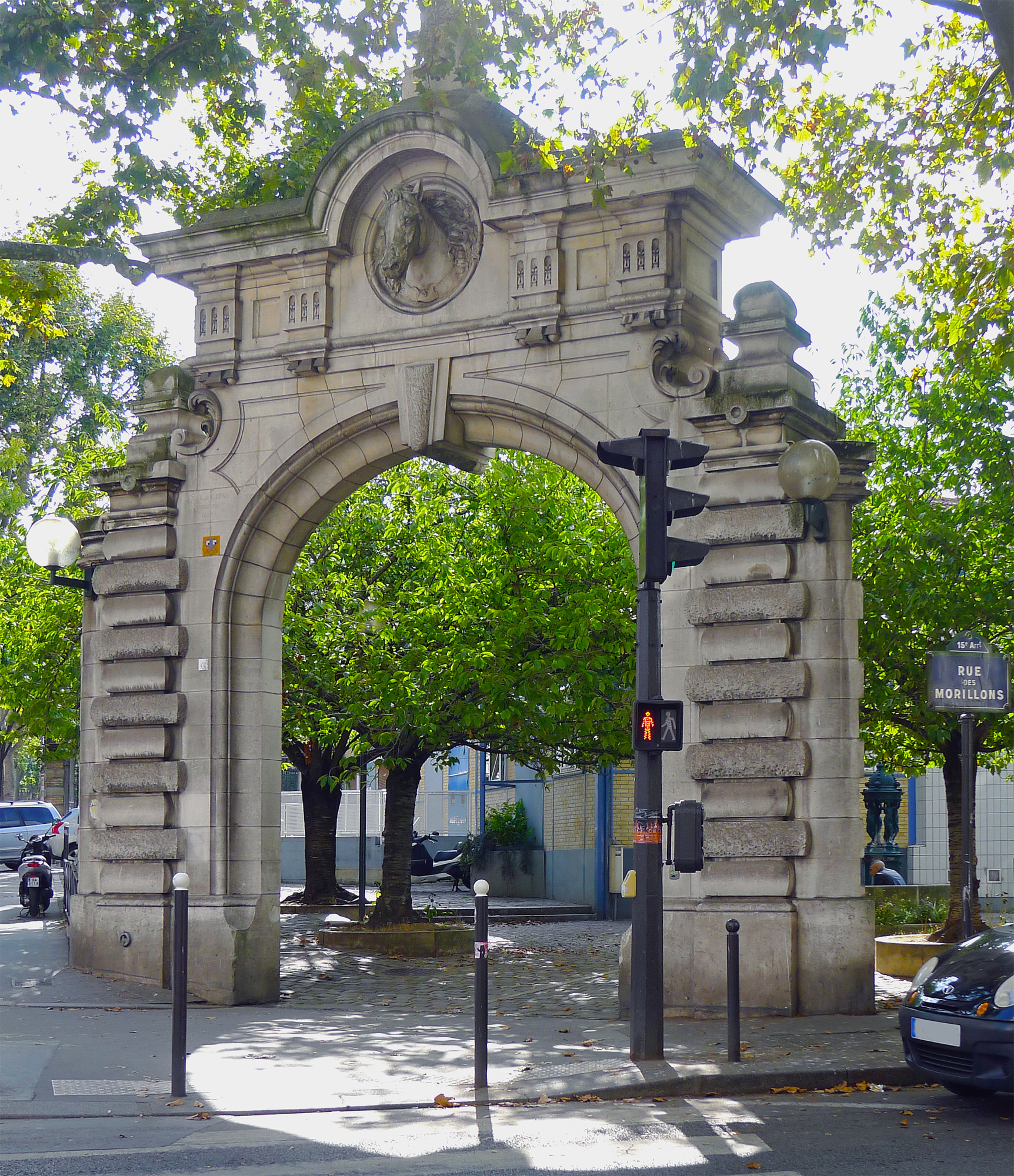
Entrance of the former Vaugirard slaughterhouses

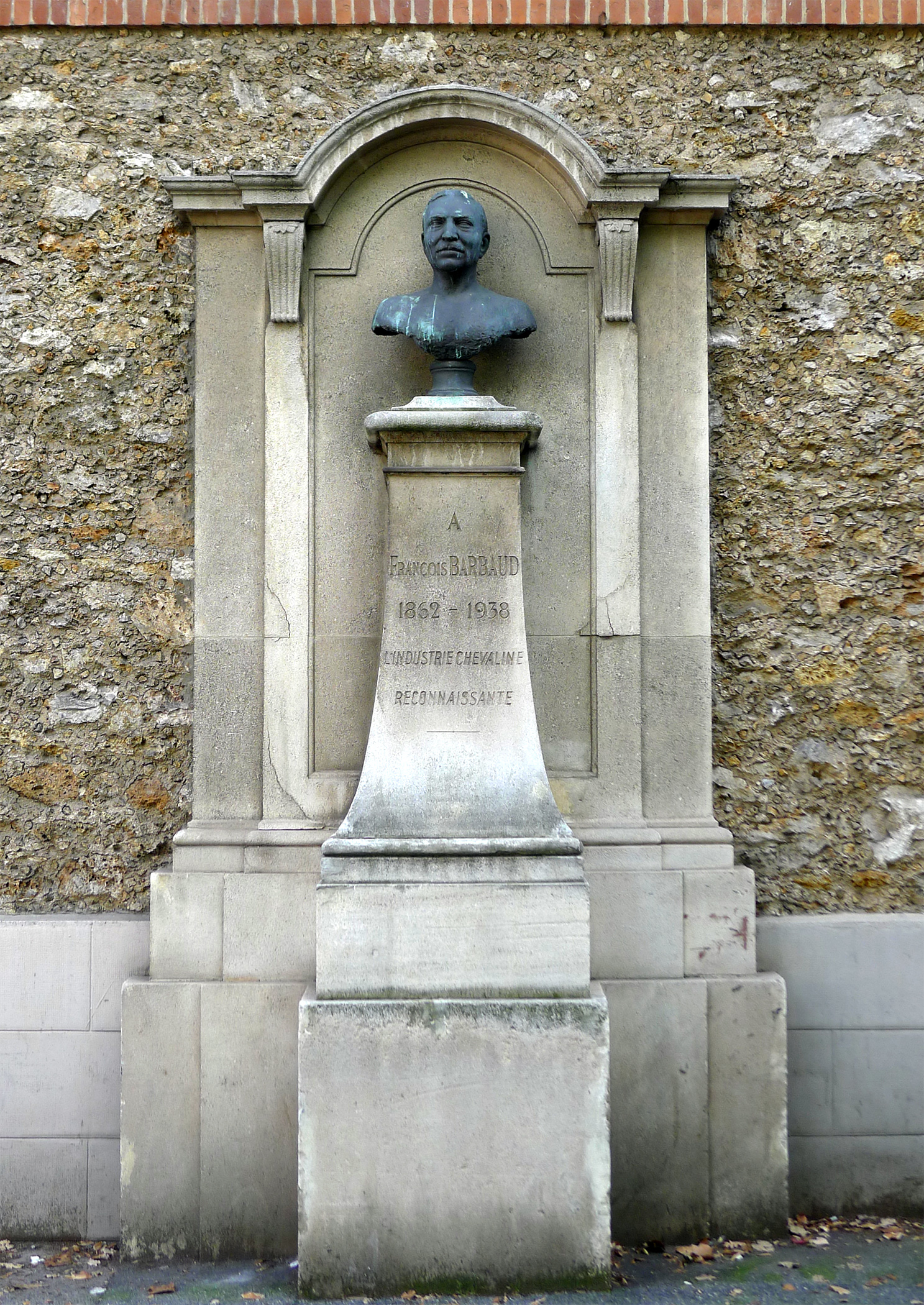
François Barbaud

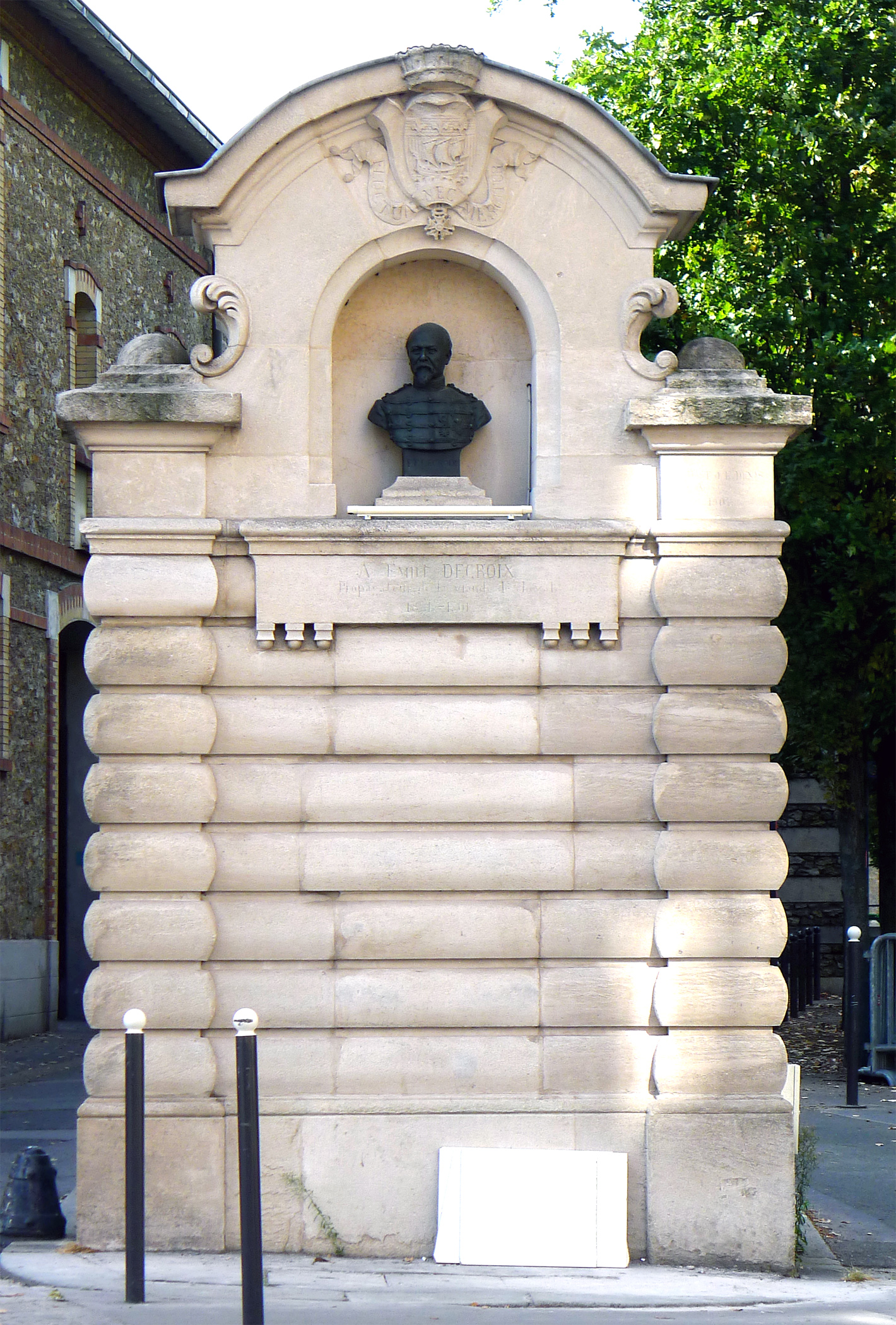
Émile Decroix

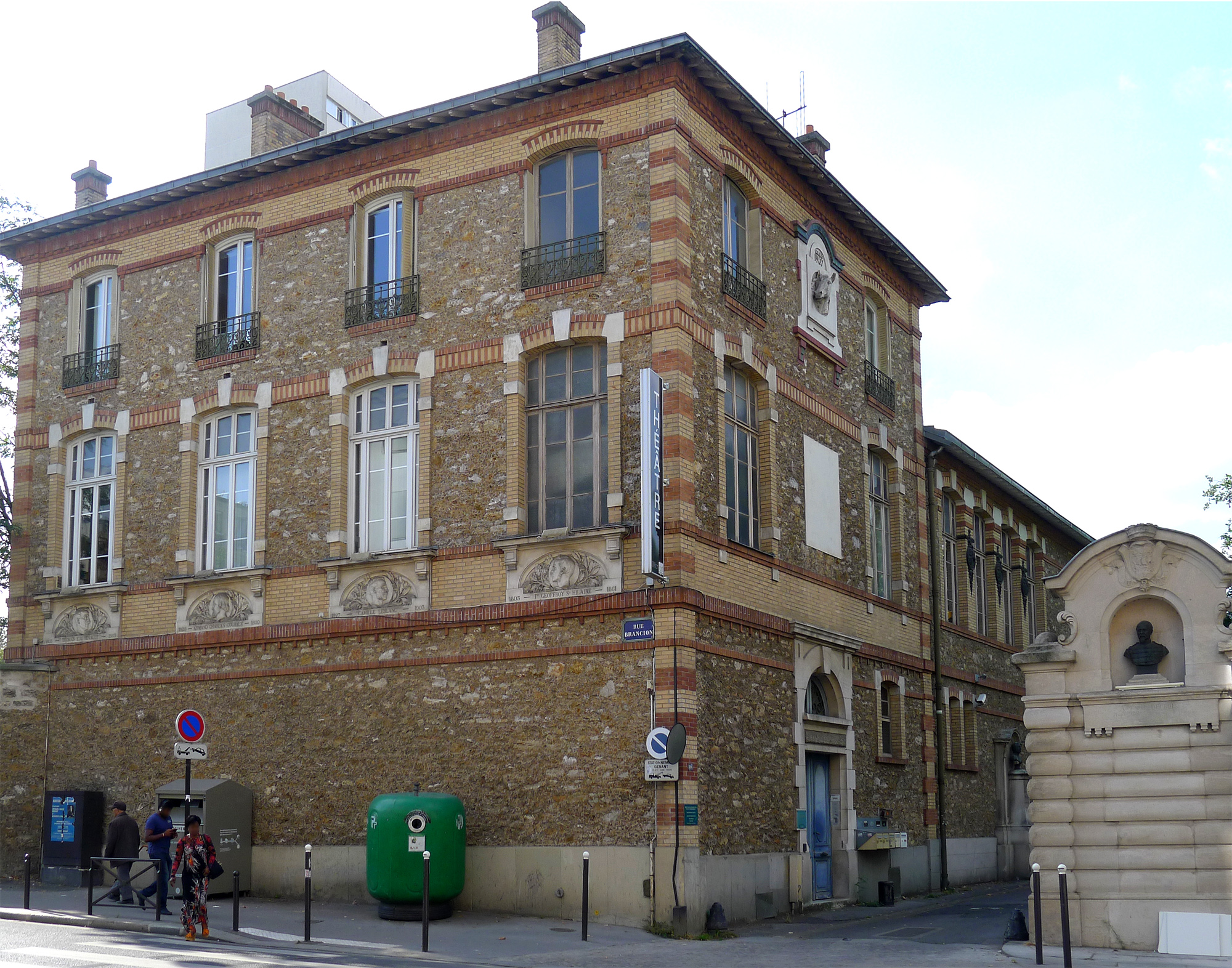
Monfort-Théâtre
