= Edward Bryant (actor) =

British actor

Edward Bryant was born in London, England in 1957, and is an English actor.

He is perhaps best known for his appearances in the films Rita starring alongside Julie T. Wallace and the 2006 film The Rulers and Dealers by Stephen Lloyd Jackson with Philippe Deguara, Terence Anderson and Freema Agyeman in which he played Fletcher. He also played the character of Mum in Steven Berkoff's production of East which ran at the Vaudeville Theatre in London's West End theatre district during 1999.

Edward Bryant has also performed extensively in Christmas pantomimes such as Aladdin at the Connaught Theatre, Worthing with Janet Dibley in 1992 and he also performed at the Algiva Theatre in Chesham with Sam Kelly in Cinderella in 2004.
