= The Ages of Man (play) =

Play

The Ages of Man is a one-man show performed by John Gielgud featuring a collection of speeches in Shakespeare's plays. Based on an anthology edited by Oxford professor George Rylands in 1939 that organized the speeches to show the journey of life from birth to death, the show takes its title from Jaques' "Ages of Man" speech from As You Like It ("All the world's a stage and all the men and women merely players..."). Like the book, the show was divided into three parts: Youth, Manhood and Old Age.

Gielgud was inspired to do a Shakespeare recital by his great-aunt, actress Ellen Terry, who performed her own recital titled Shakespeare's Heroines. Gielgud first attempted such a recital during World War II, when he would perform a collection of speeches he called Shakespeare in Peace and War, culminating in the "Once More Unto the Breach" speech from Henry V.

Gielgud gave the first experimental performance of The Ages of Man in a house in St. James Square in London. It premiered at the Freemason's Hall at the 1957 Edinburgh Festival to a sold-out house and an overwhelming success. Gielgud would go on to perform the recital for the next ten years all over the world, winning a special Tony Award for the 1959 Broadway engagement (where it was revived in 1963), an Emmy Award for producer David Susskind for Outstanding Dramatic Program – Single Program for its 1966 telecast on CBS, and a 1979 Grammy Award for Gielgud's third audio recording of the recital, having been nominated for the same award for the versions made in 1959 and 1964. The 1966 television version was released on DVD in 2010, and the album made from the play is available as an mp3.

== See also ==
- Shakespeare's Villains, a one-man play performed by Steven Berkoff exploring and analysing villains from Shakespeare's plays
