= East (play) =

1975 play by Steven Berkoff

- Poster advertising The London Theatre Group's 1977 production of East at the Regent Theatre, London.
- Original language: English
- Written by: Steven Berkoff
- Genre: Verse drama, physical theatre, comedy
- Setting: London's East End

Premiere
- Date: 1975
- Place: Traverse Theatre, Edinburgh
- Official website

East is a 1975 verse play by Steven Berkoff, dealing with growing up and rites of passage in London's rough East End.

The play premiered at the Edinburgh Festival at the Traverse in 1975, with the production later transferring to the King's Head in London.

== Notable productions ==
World premiere

Performed by The London Theatre group at the Traverse Theatre as part of the Edinburgh Festival and later transferred to the King's Head, London.
Directed by Steven Berkoff.

- Dad - Barry Stanton
- Mum - Robert Longden
- Sylv - Anna Nygh
- Les - Barry Philips
- Mike - Steven Berkoff

1976 Greenwich production

Performed with a revised script in July 1976 at the Greenwich Theatre.

- Dad - Mathew Scurfield
- Mum - David Delve
- Sylv - Anna Nygh
- Les - Barry Philips
- Mike - Steven Berkoff

25th Anniversary Production

The 25th anniversary production, started at the Churchill Theatre, Bromley. The tour included performing at the Edinburgh Festival from 4 August (winning the Stage Award for Best Ensemble work at the Edinburgh Festival Fringe) and it was performed at London's Vaudeville Theatre on 15 September 1999. The production was also performed at Théâtre de Silvia Monfort, Paris from 7 March 2000 as part of the "Londres sur Scène" festival.

Performed by East Productions.
Directed by Steven Berkoff.

- Dad - Jonathan Linsley
- Mum - Edward Bryant
- Sylv - Tanya Franks
- Les - Matthew Cullum
- Mike - Christopher Middleton

A performance from the Vaudeville Theatre run was filmed in front of a live audience. The recording has been released on VHS, DVD and is available for streaming or digital rental on Digital Theatre.

2018 London Revival

Performed by Atticist theatre company 9 January 2018 at The King's Head Theatre, London.
Directed by Jessica Lazar.

- Dad - Russell Barnett
- Mum - Debra Penny
- Sylv - Boadicea Ricketts
- Les - Jack Condon
- Mike - James Craze

The production was met with critical acclaim, receiving five award nominations and selling out its entire run.

== Legacy ==
Reputation

East was listed as one of 100 of the “best and most influential plays” performed in Britain from 1945 - 2010, by the book and accompanying iPad app Played in Britain: Modern Theatre in 100 Plays.

The critic Aleks Sierz has called the play an "in-yer-face classic" and has named Berkoff as "a pioneer of in-yer-face theatre". The label of in-yer-face theatre, popularised by Sierz, is used to describe a confrontational style and sensibility of drama, which became prominent in new plays performed in Britain during the 1990s. However, Sierz has cited East (along with some other plays) as being "an exception" for fitting the category of in-yer-face theatre prior to the 1990s.

Influence

East has been cited as inspiring some of the work of a variety of playwrights and theatre makers.

The critic Lyn Gardner has stated that the play "foreshadowed the physical-theatre boom of the 80s and 90s. East and Berkoff helped inspire all those companies such as Théâtre de Complicité and Frantic Assembly."

Early in his career the playwright Mark Ravenhill wrote the short play Blood Brood, which was performed at the 1987 Edinburgh Fringe Festival. Ravenhill described his play as "the story of the Kray twins in blank verse, inspired by Berkoff's East."

The actor, director, stage manager and writer Harry Gibson mounted "the first revival of East outside London, in 1978" and has cited the play as "the biggest influence" on his stage adaptation of Irvine Welsh's novel Trainspotting.

Actor and playwright Elliot Warren wrote his 2016 verse play Flesh and Bone as a result of being unable to afford the rights to perform East. Warren's Flesh and Bone was strongly influenced by Berkoff's play and went on to win multiple awards, including the 2019 Olivier Award for Outstanding Achievement in Affiliate Theatre.
