= Monfort-Théâtre =

Theatre company and building in Paris, France

Théâtre Silvia-Monfort
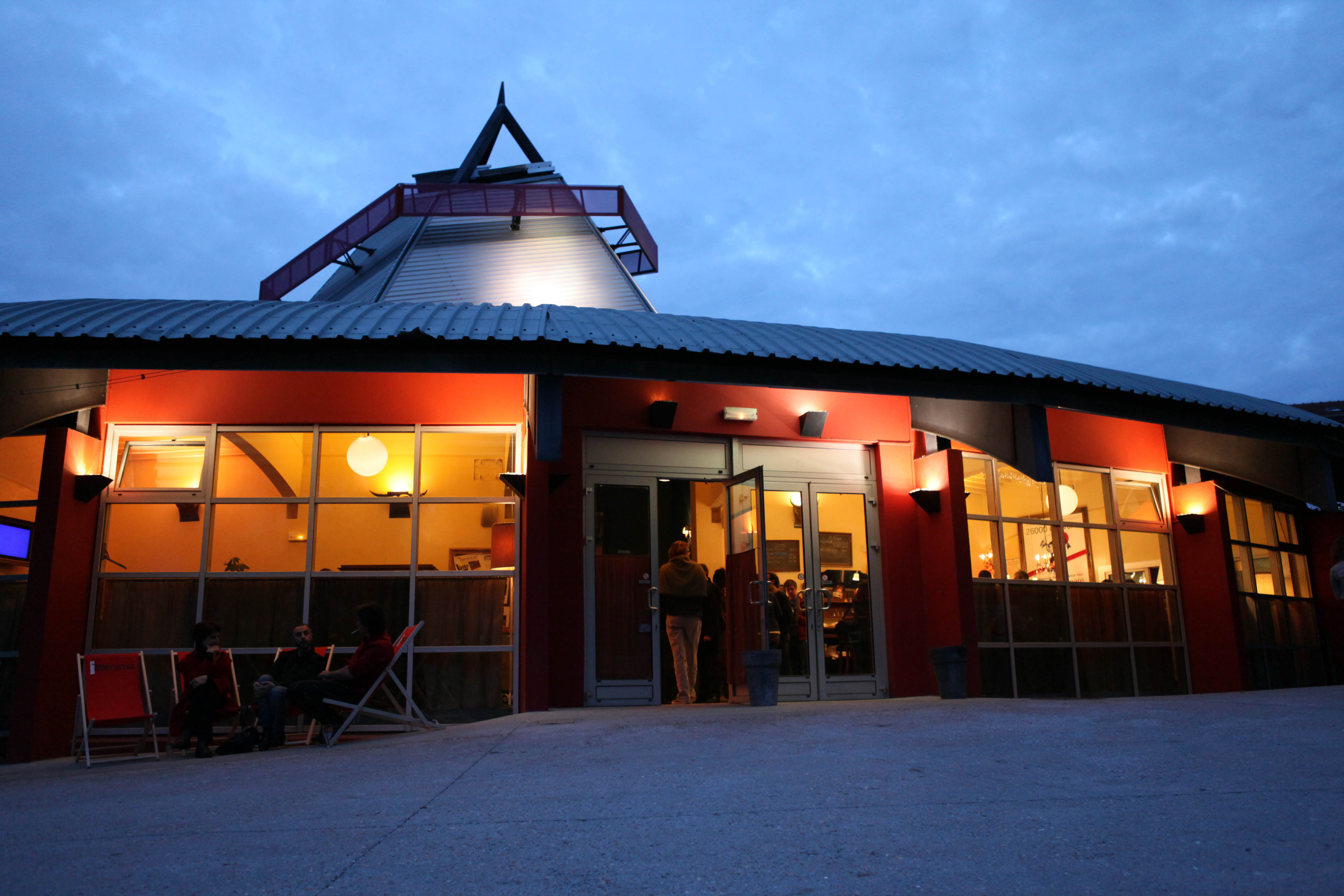
- Façade of the Théâtre Silvia-Monfort
- Interactive map of Théâtre Silvia-Monfort
- Address: 106 Rue Brancion; Paris; France
- Coordinates: 48.8308°N 2.3021°E
- Capacity: 456

Construction
- Opened: 1992
- Architect: Claude Parent

Website
- www.lemonfort.fr

The Théâtre Silvia-Monfort (French pronunciation: [teɑtʁ silvja mɔ̃fɔʁ]) is a theatre company and building in Paris, located at 106 rue Brancion in the 15th arrondissement. It has 456 seats and its stage is 15m wide by 7m high.

== History ==
In 1972, Silvia Monfort set up the Carré Thorigny in a scrap metal warehouse in Paris's Marais, where she hosted contemporary and classic plays as well as dance and music. She favoured Cirque Grüss's installation in the courtyard of the hôtel Salé. This first Carré was named "cultural centre of Les Halles and the Marais" by the town council of Paris and the French Ministry of Culture. In 1974 the Carré moved into the abandoned premises of the théâtre de la Gaîté-Lyrique, setting up the Grüss circus in the square outside the theatre and taking the name "Nouveau Carré Silvia-Monfort". It was promoted to "Centre d’animation culturelle de Paris". In 1977, the Nouveau Carré moved again, this time into a tent in the Jardin d'Acclimatation then on the Plateau Beaubourg before finally settling in 1979 on the site of the former abattoirs in Vaugirard, where it set up one tent for the circus and a second for the theatre.

In May 1989 the Carré Silvia-Monfort ended its time in tents to build a permanent theatre designed by the architect Claude Parent. Housed on the former access ramp into the abattoirs, it would be a hexagonal metallic pyramid 23m high beside the parc Georges-Brassens. On Silvia Monfort's death in spring 1991, whilst the theatre was still under construction, the Conseil de Paris unanimously decided to name it after her. The mairie de Paris also made Régis Santon its head. It finally opened on 7 January 1992, with a production of Jean Anouilh's La Valse des Torréadors. Since September 2009, under the leadership of Laurence de Magalhaes and Stéphane Ricordel, the Théâtre Silvia Monfort changed its outer appearance, adding coloured images, a bar and refurbished dressing rooms mixing up the universes of 1970s circus caravans and a garden terrace.
