= Shakespeare's Villains =

Play written by Steven Berkoff

- Original language: English
- Written by: Steven Berkoff
- Characters: One
- Genre: Anthology

Premiere
- Date: 7 July 1998
- Place: Theatre Royal, Haymarket, London

Shakespeare's Villains is a one-man play, created and performed by Steven Berkoff.

Following its first run at London's Theatre Royal, Haymarket (7 July – 8 August 1998) where it was produced by Berkoff's East Productions and Marc Sinden (who also co-directed), it was nominated for The Society of London Theatre Laurence Olivier Award for Best Entertainment.

Performed around the world by Berkoff since 1998, the piece explores and analyses Shakespeare's most villainous characters, including Iago, the Macbeths, Shylock and Richard III – characters who are inherently evil and whose situation leads them to do evil deeds, or who are at the mercy of an evil society.

== See also ==
- The Ages of Man, a one-man play performed by John Gielgud containing speeches from Shakespeare's plays
