= Watch Your Own Heart Attack =

2008 public information film

Watch Your Own Heart Attack is a two-minute public information film advertisement produced by the British Heart Foundation (BHF), starring Steven Berkoff, which illustrates how it feels to have a heart attack. It was first shown on ITV1 on 10 August 2008.

== The "Hollywood" heart attack ==
Steven Berkoff describing a heart attack in the film

The stereotypical heart attack, represented in films (such as Ocean's Thirteen, where Elliott Gould was shown falling over and clutching his chest, and Something's Gotta Give which showed Jack Nicholson's character being rescued from his attack by Diane Keaton) and in television is not always true to life, yet a YouGov poll discovered that 38 per cent of people believe the signs of a heart attack will always be crippling chest pains.

The British Heart Foundation was concerned that many people underestimated the effect of a heart attack due to the way they are represented on television programmes and in films, so produced the film in an attempt to educate viewers about the devastating realities of an attack.

The film features actor Steven Berkoff who punches and gags a largely unseen person and aims to graphically illustrate what it is like to have a heart attack, simulating the symptoms by using methods including a punch to the chest, taping the mouth of the sufferer to simulate breathing difficulties, and hugging them to show tightness in the chest, and ends with the victim vomiting while Berkoff warns that not all heart attack symptoms are as obvious as people think. They could be mistaken for a sports injury, indigestion, "last night's curry" or similar.

== Production ==
This public information film advertisement, the first work for the charity by advertising agency Grey London since it won the account of British Heart Foundation in May 2008, was conceived by creative director Jon Williams, art director Damon Troth and copywriter Joanna Perry at Grey and directed by Brett Foraker through RSA Films. It was produced by Rebecca Pople who secured and suggested Steven Berkoff for the main role as well delivered the film on a pro bono budget. It is filmed from the subjective perspective of the heart attack victim. Jon Williams, chief creative officer at Grey London, has commented that when researching ideas for the spot, someone observed, "what you really need to do is give everyone in Britain a heart attack," which is what the film aims to achieve through its use of subjective point of view.

A British Heart Foundation spokesman said the film aims to alert people to call 999 as soon as they experience heart attack symptoms and not to dismiss them as being caused by minor problems.

== Advertising campaign ==
A billboard advertising campaign was launched across the UK in the weeks running up to the showing, while personalities such as Angela Rippon, David Cameron, Ainsley Harriott and Jeremy Kyle gave their backing to the film.

The viewing figures for the film were 6.5 million, which is higher than the 6.1 million that the episode of Midsomer Murders, during which the film ran, received.
