= Sink the Belgrano! =

1986 play by Steven Berkoff

- Promotional material for the play's original production at the Half Moon Theatre.
- Original language: English
- Written by: Steven Berkoff
- Genre: Political satire, Verse drama

Premiere
- Date: 2 September 1986
- Place: Half Moon Theatre

Sink the Belgrano! is a 1986 satirical play in verse written by English playwright Steven Berkoff. It premiered at the Half Moon Theatre on 2 September 1986.

The play is about British Prime Minister Margaret Thatcher's decision to torpedo the Argentinian ship General Belgrano, as it was purportedly retreating during the 1982 Falklands War between the United Kingdom and Argentina.

According to the British Council, Sink the Belgrano is among Berkoff's "lesser-known works".

== Characters ==
- Maggot Scratcher (parody of Margaret Thatcher)
- Pimp (parody of Francis Pym)
- Nit (parody of John Nott)
- Chorus
- Command
- Tell
- Woody (parody of Sandy Woodward)
- Tommy
- President of Argentina
- Feet
- Sir Fish Face
- Reason
- Sailors
- Farmers

== Initial critical reception ==
According to Berkoff the play received "mixed-reviews and some virulent ones from the right-wing press. It was curious that their reviews, which were almost hysterical cant, resembled so closely the threats and poisoned mail I received from Fascist thugs." Berkoff also states that The Observer "refused to even review it" which he saw as "people refusing to review a point of view that differed from government's kind of status quo attitude that [they] were the heroes". Because of this Berkoff described The Observer's actions as that of "stinking, spineless cowards" and speculated that "maybe there was a government order [saying] don't review it". Berkoff has also said that the production originally had "one or two good reviews" and he felt that with more critical support the play would have transferred to the West End. However, this did not happen with Berkoff saying that "eventually the press they killed us. By not supporting us."
