= Boulevard Lefebvre =

Street in Paris, France

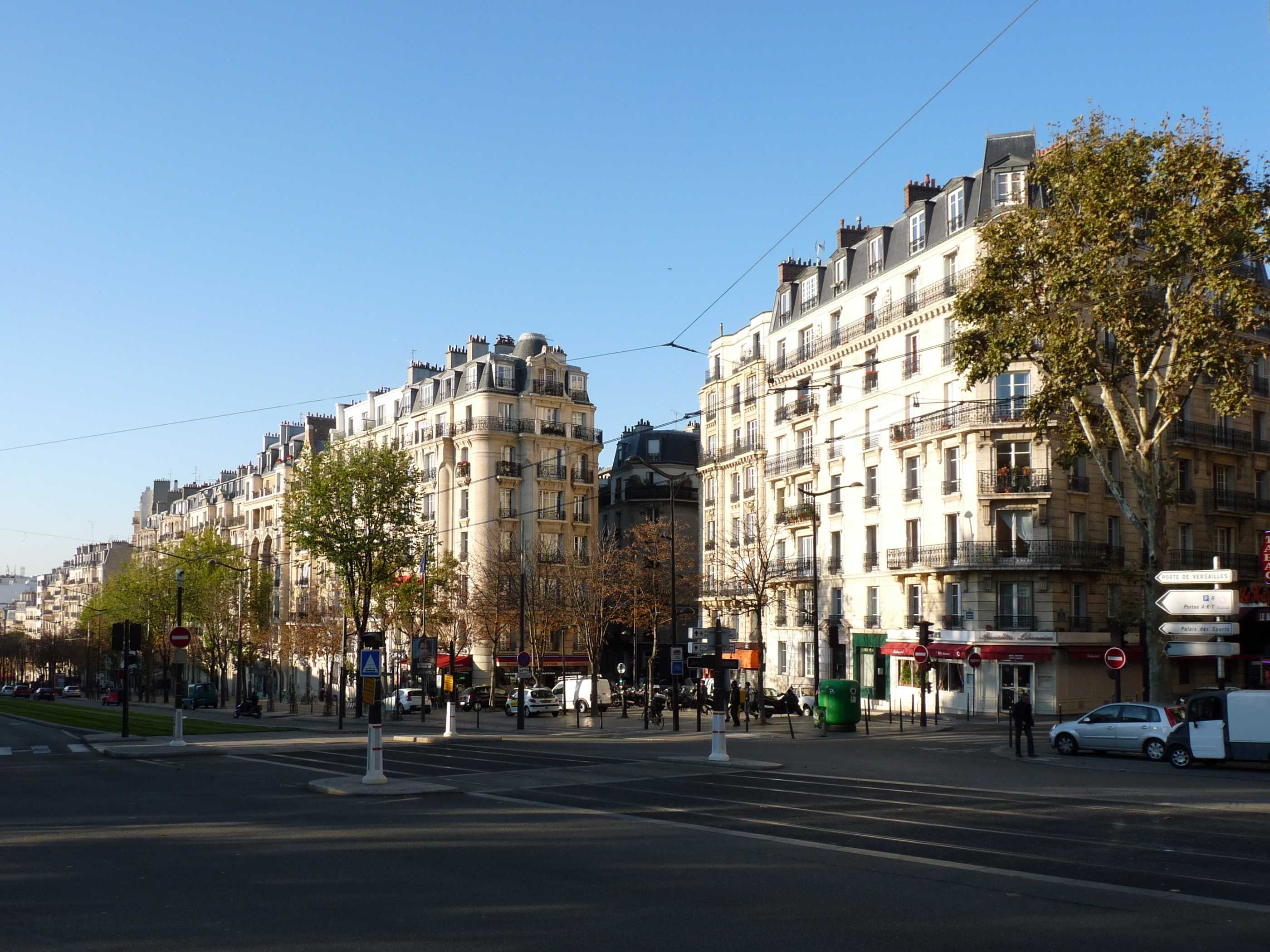
- Looking toward the Exhibitions Center

- Location within Paris
- Namesake: François Joseph Lefebvre
- Length: 1,265 m (4,150 ft)
- Width: 40 m (130 ft)
- Arrondissement: 15th
- Quarter: Saint-Lambert
- Coordinates: 48°49′47″N 2°17′45″E
- From: 407, Rue de Vaugirard
- To: Boulevard Brune

Construction
- Denomination: 2 March 1864

The Boulevard Lefebvre (French pronunciation: [bulvaʁ ləfɛvʁ]) is a boulevard in the Saint-Lambert quarter in the 15th arrondissement of Paris, France. It is one of the Boulevards of the Marshals, which run in the outer parts of the city.

== Location ==
The former buildings of the Central Civil Engineering Laboratory stand on the southern side of the boulevard. Across the boulevard, on the northern side, there is a group of buildings, one of whom collapsed during its construction in January 1964, killing at least 20 people and injuring at least 18. This accident was known as the Boulevard Lefebvre disaster.

The Exhibitions Center and the Dôme de Paris stand along the boulevard.

Boulevard Lefebvre was accessible through the Petite Ceinture bus line. Now it can be reached through the tramway Line 3a.

== History ==
The French war department had completed the Thiers wall – including fortifications, a dry moat, a Rue Militaire and a large berm – around 1840. In 1859, the military engineering service gave conditional control to the Paris city council. The expansion of the land area of Paris in 1860, by annexing bordering communities, created a situation where everything within the Thiers wall was Paris and everything without was not. The Thiers wall, with its accompanying berm and moat, led to a profound disruption and complication of the synergistic relationship between Paris and its suburbs. Paris city council started upgrading and conversion of some sections of the Rue Militaire into boulevards in 1861, with the (yet unnamed) Boulevard Lefebvre one of the first stretches to open.

On March 2, 1864, the boulevard was named after François Joseph Lefebvre (1755-1820), Duke of Dantzig and Marshal of France.

Each section of the upgraded Rue Militaire was then named for a marshal of the First French Empire (1804–1814) who served under Napoleon I, leading to the entire ring being collectively called the Boulevards of the Marshals. The Boulevards of the Marshals concept was almost fully realized by 1932, though the final three sections, closing the ring, would not be completed until 2005. Of the 22 boulevards, 19 have been named for Lefebvre or one of his fellow First Empire marshals.

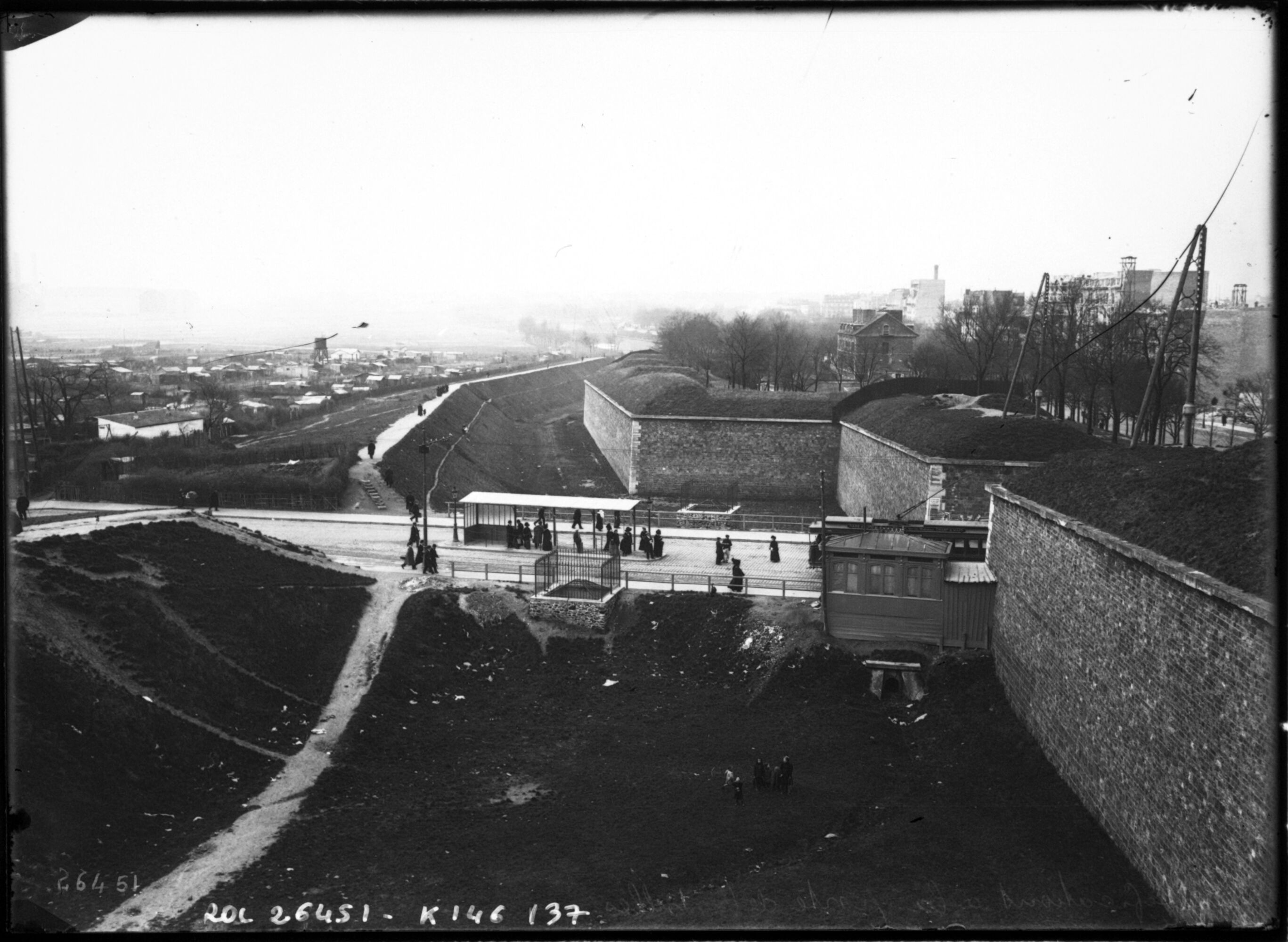
A portion of the Thiers wall, showing the berm and dry moat, near Porte de Versailles.

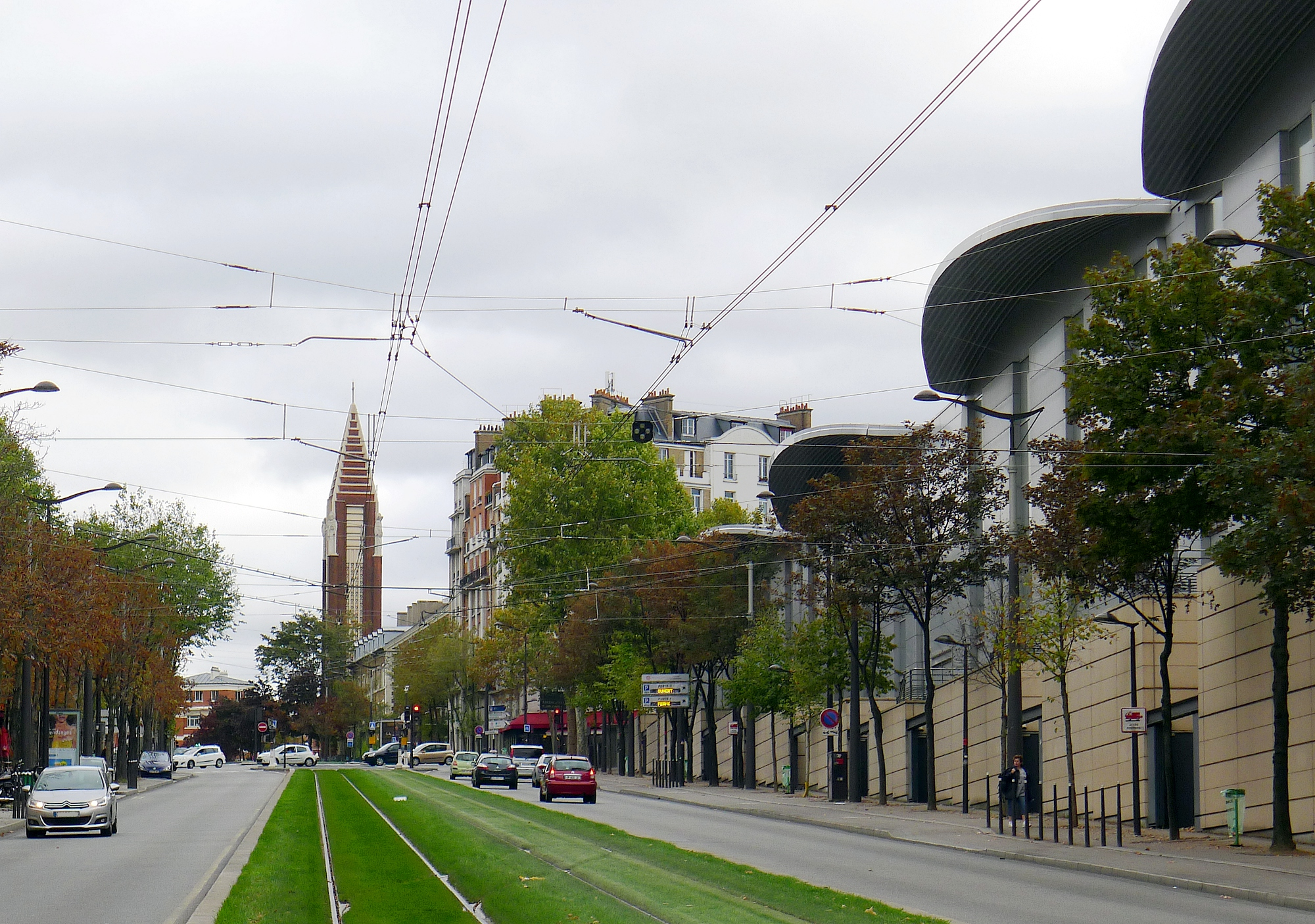
The boulevard seen from Porte de Versailles, with the Church of Saint Anthony of Padua in the background.

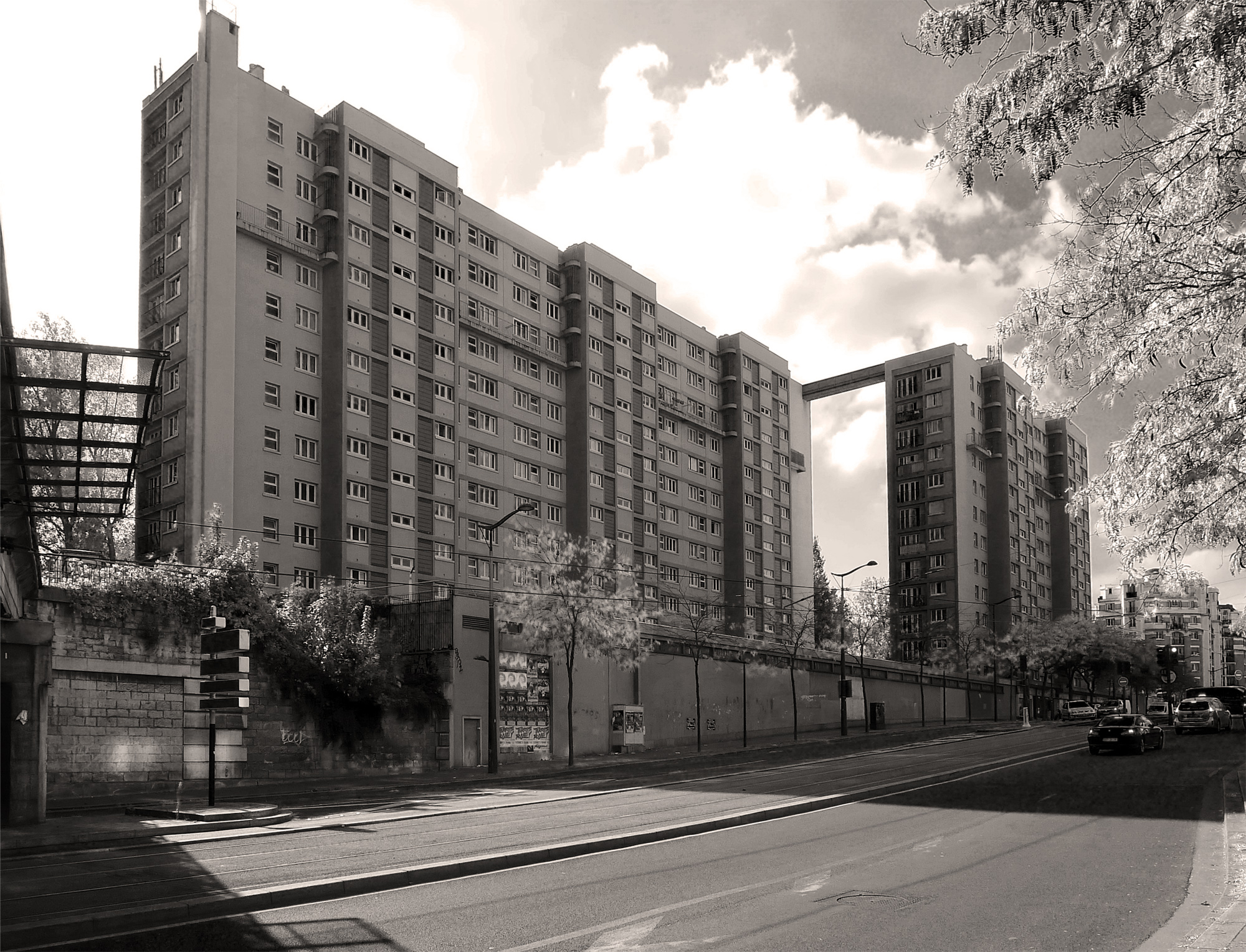
The boulevard near porte Brancion.

== Historic buildings ==
- No. 52: Church of Saint Anthony of Padua, Paris
- No. 58: former buildings of the Central Civil Engineering Laboratory
- No. 169: a low-rent house built by architect Jules Lavirotte in 1906.
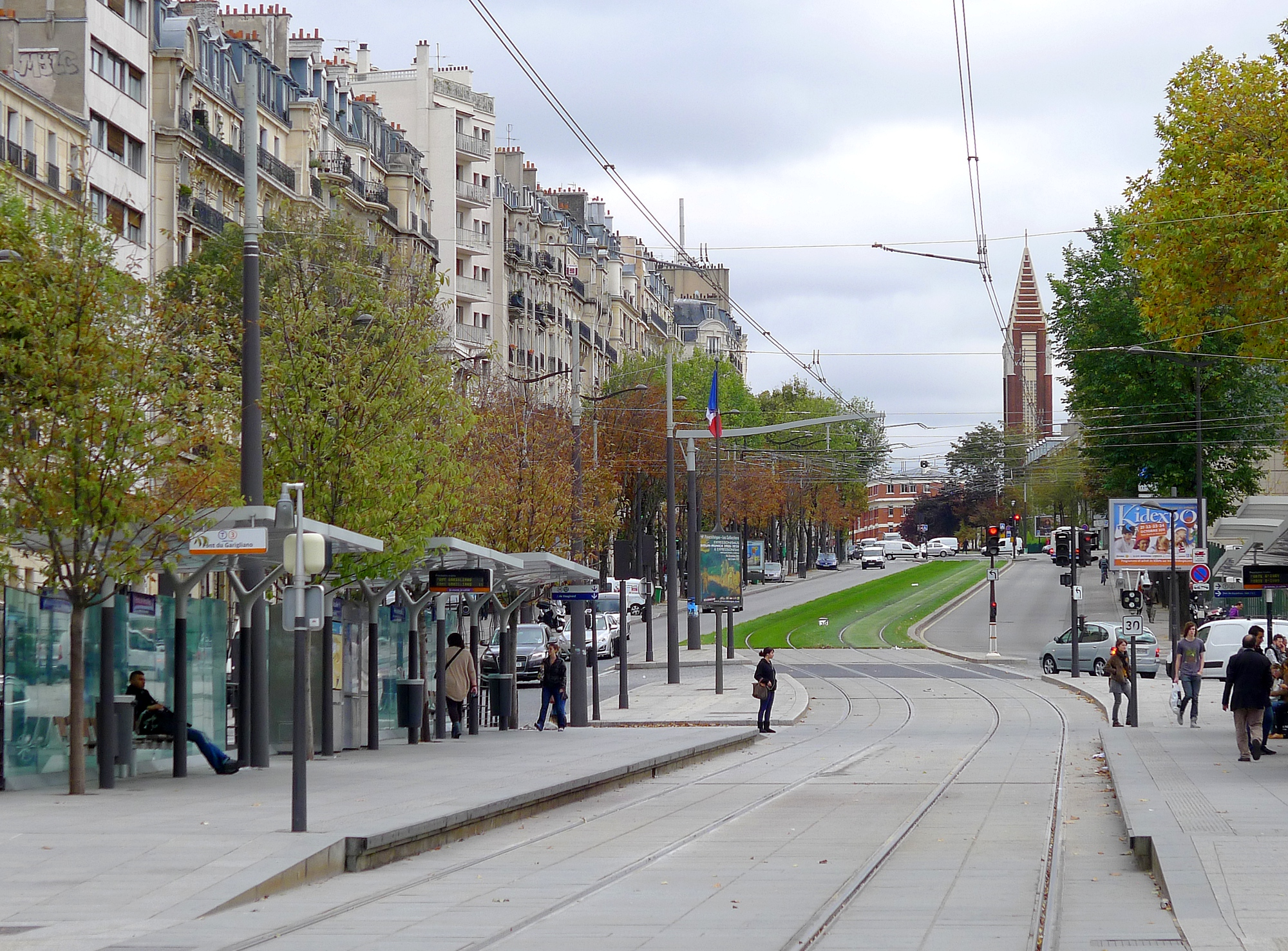
Tramway Line 3 at Porte de Versailles

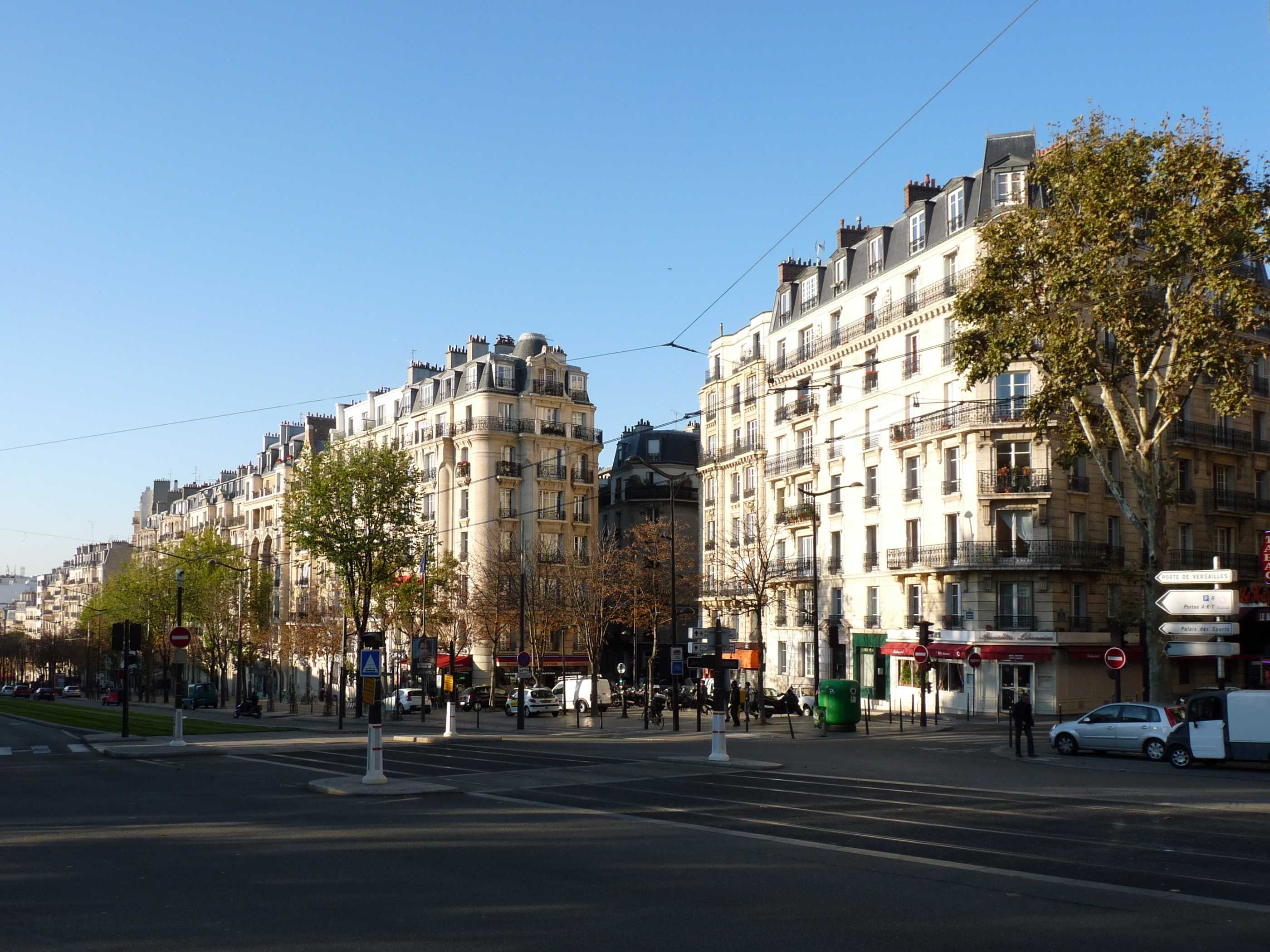
The boulevard (looking toward Porte de Versailles).

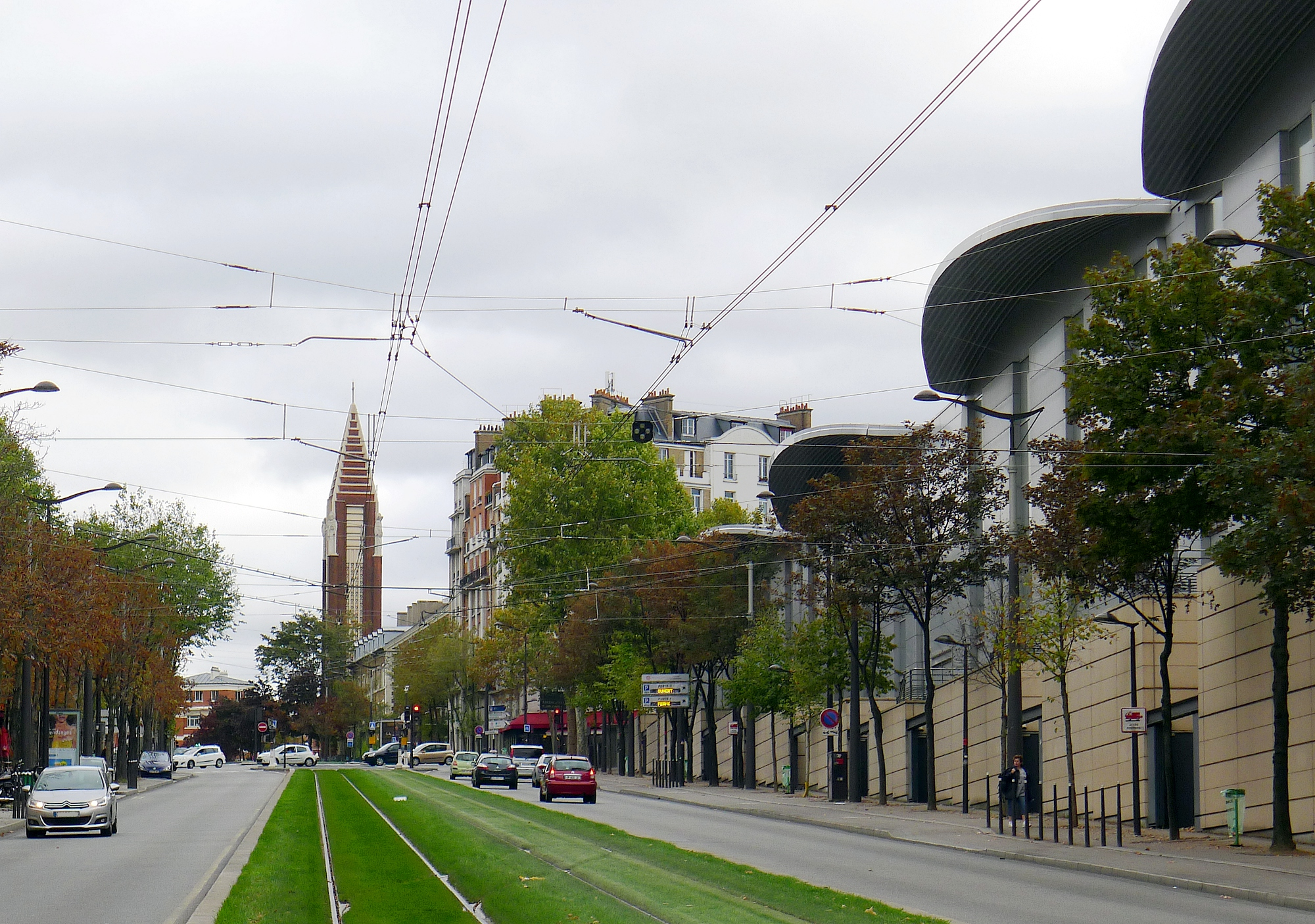
Looking toward the Church of Saint Anthony of Padua.

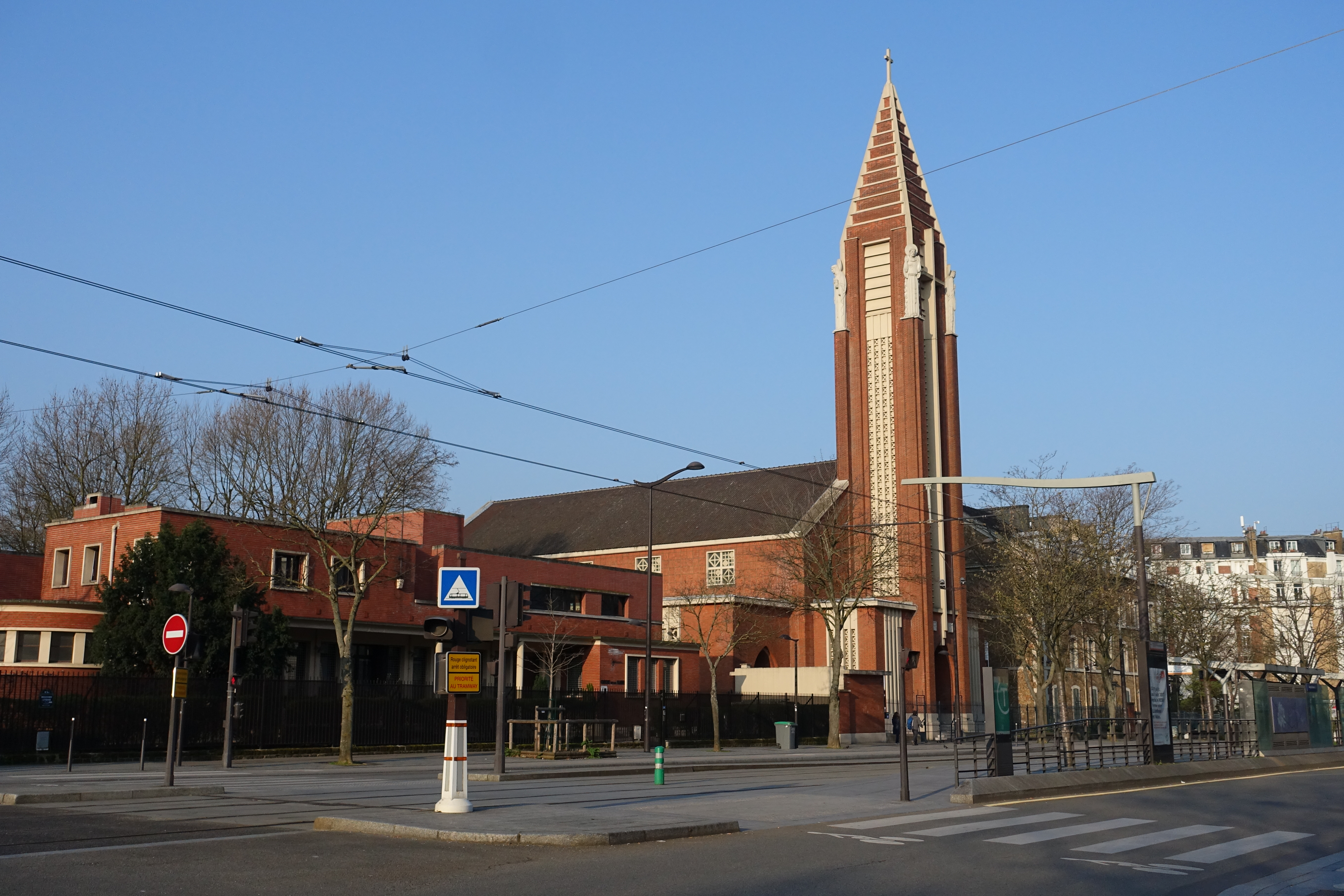
Church of Saint Anthony of Padua.
