= Parc Georges-Brassens =

Public park in Paris, France

Coordinates: 48°49′54″N 2°18′00″E

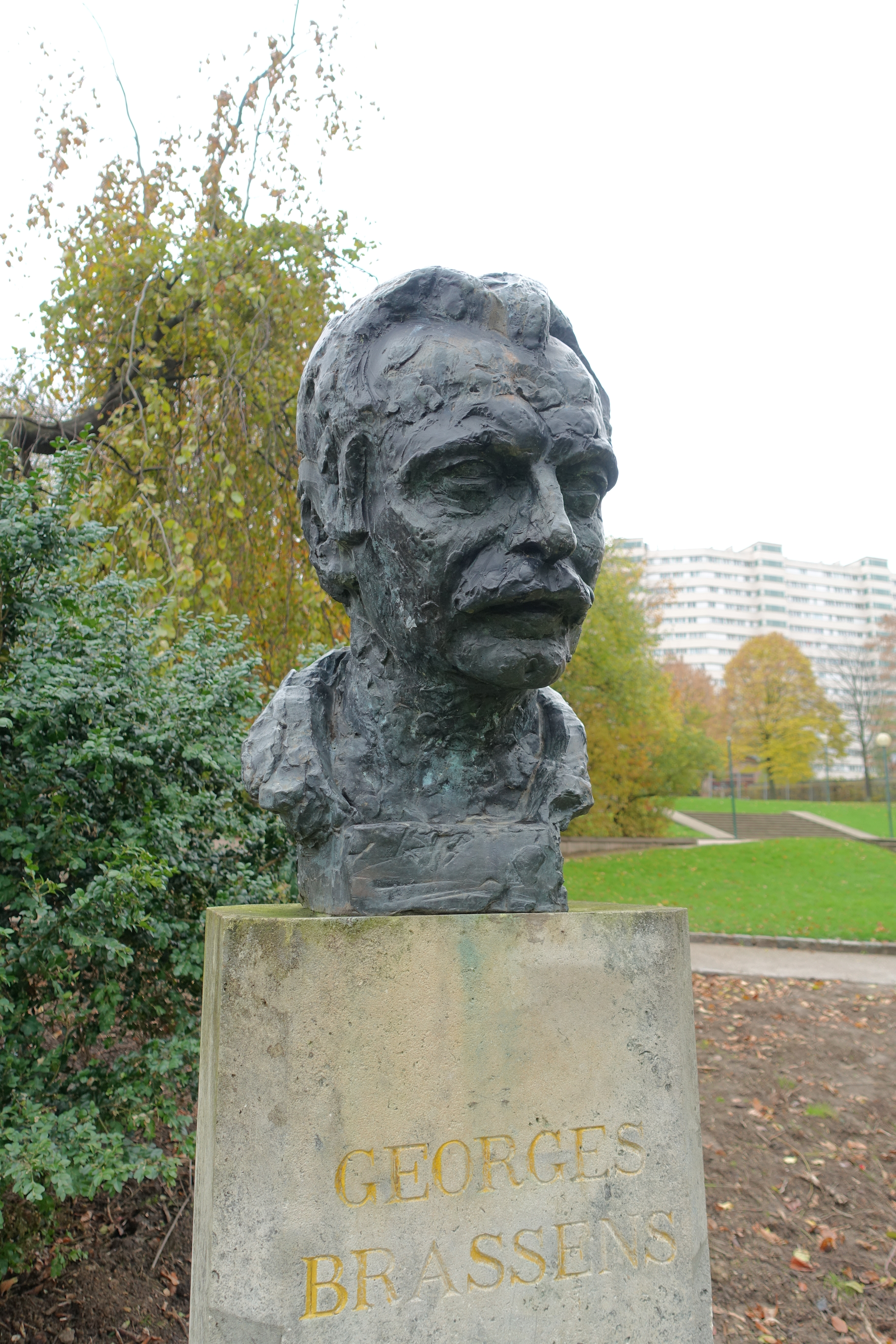
Bust of Brassens in the Parc Georges-Brassens in Paris

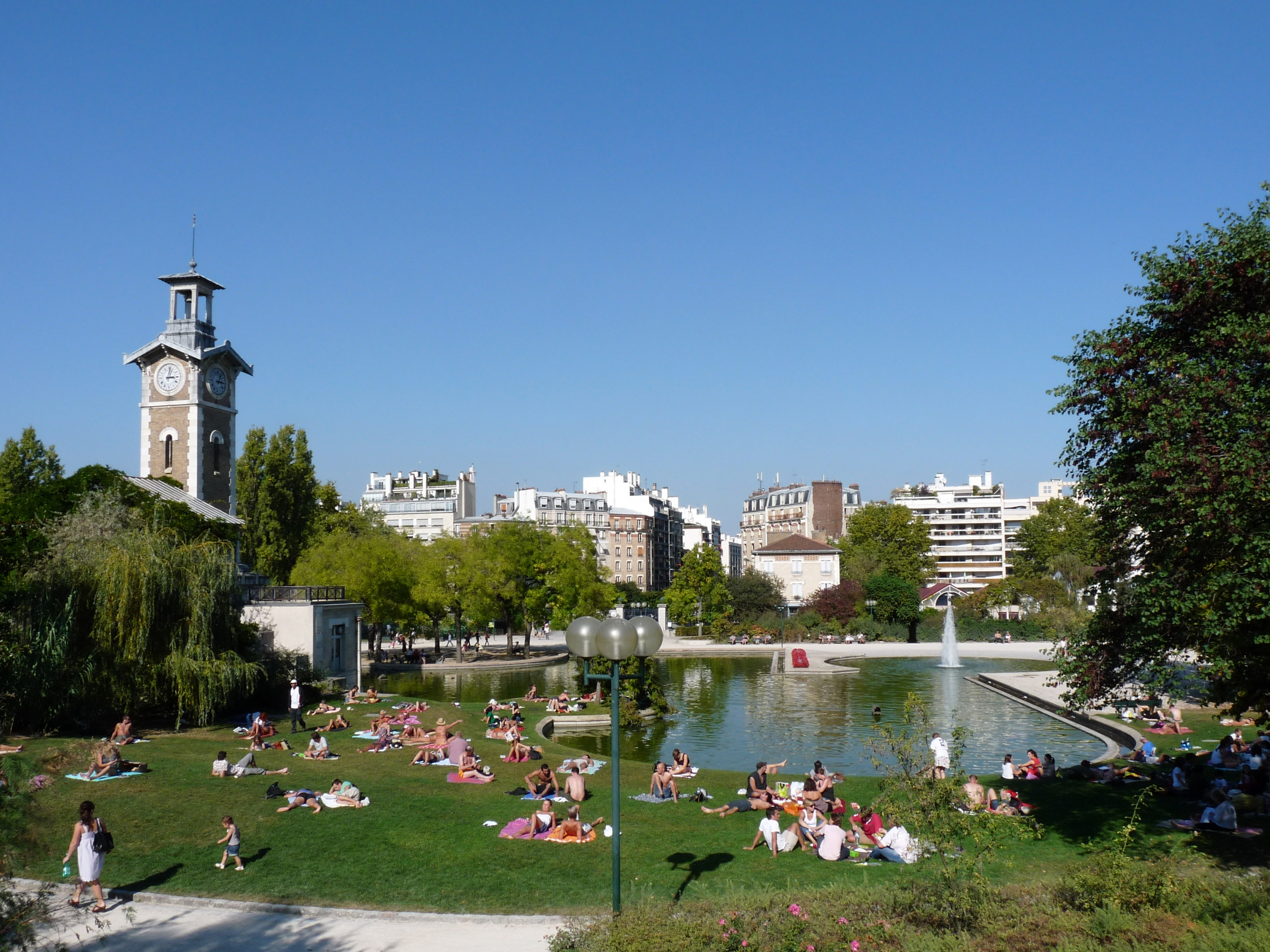
Parc Georges-Brassens

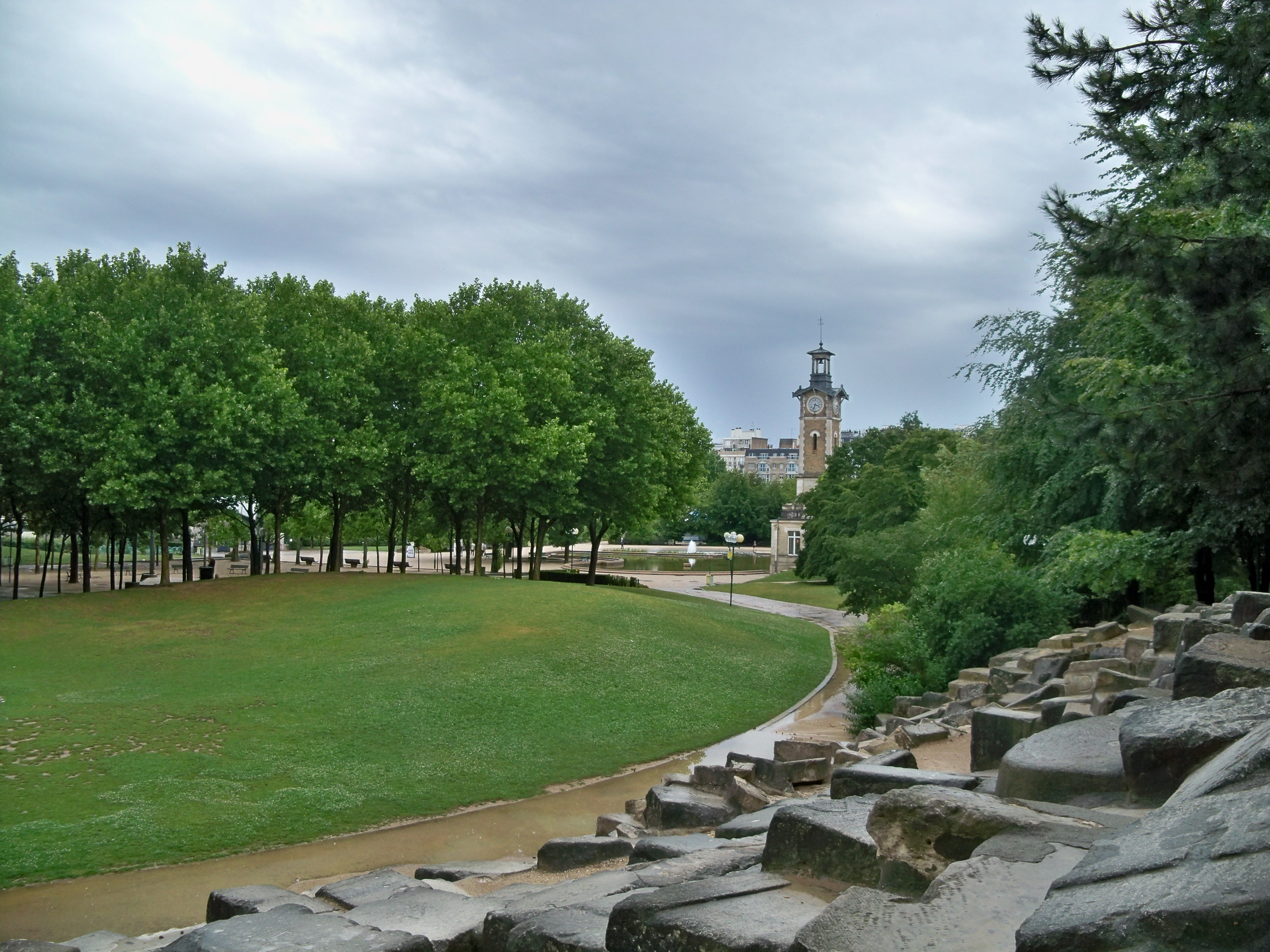
The park has lawns, groves of trees, and a "wall" of artificial rocks for children to climb

Parc Georges-Brassens is a public park located in the 15th arrondissement of Paris, between rue des Morillons and rue de Périchaux. Opened in 1984, it occupies 7.74 hectares on the site of a former fish market, horse market and slaughterhouse, and preserves some of the old market structures. It is named for the French popular singer Georges Brassens (1921–1981) who lived in the neighborhood of the park at 9 impasse Florimont and 42 rue Santos Dumont. The nearest metro stations to the park are Convention and Porte-de-Vanves.

== History ==
The markets and slaughterhouse had been built on the site between 1894 and 1897, and were gradually closed down between 1969 and 1979. The city of Paris considered first using the site for public housing or a sports complex, but engineers discovered that the ground was unstable due to the presence of abandoned quarries, and would have involved considerable improvements, so it was decided to build a park instead.

The new park was designed by the architects Ghiulamila and Milliex and the landscape architect Collin. After the public outcry that followed the destruction of the structures of the old Paris central market, Les Halles, the architects decided to keep some of the original structures of the old market, notably the gateway, the bell tower of the old fish market and the iron-framed shelter of the horse market. At the same time, they needed to integrate several public buildings into the park, including a pre-school, a center for senior citizens, and a theater; and to use greenery to conceal the building of the prefecture of police, next to the park.

== Features of the Park ==
Parc Georges-Brassens, Paris

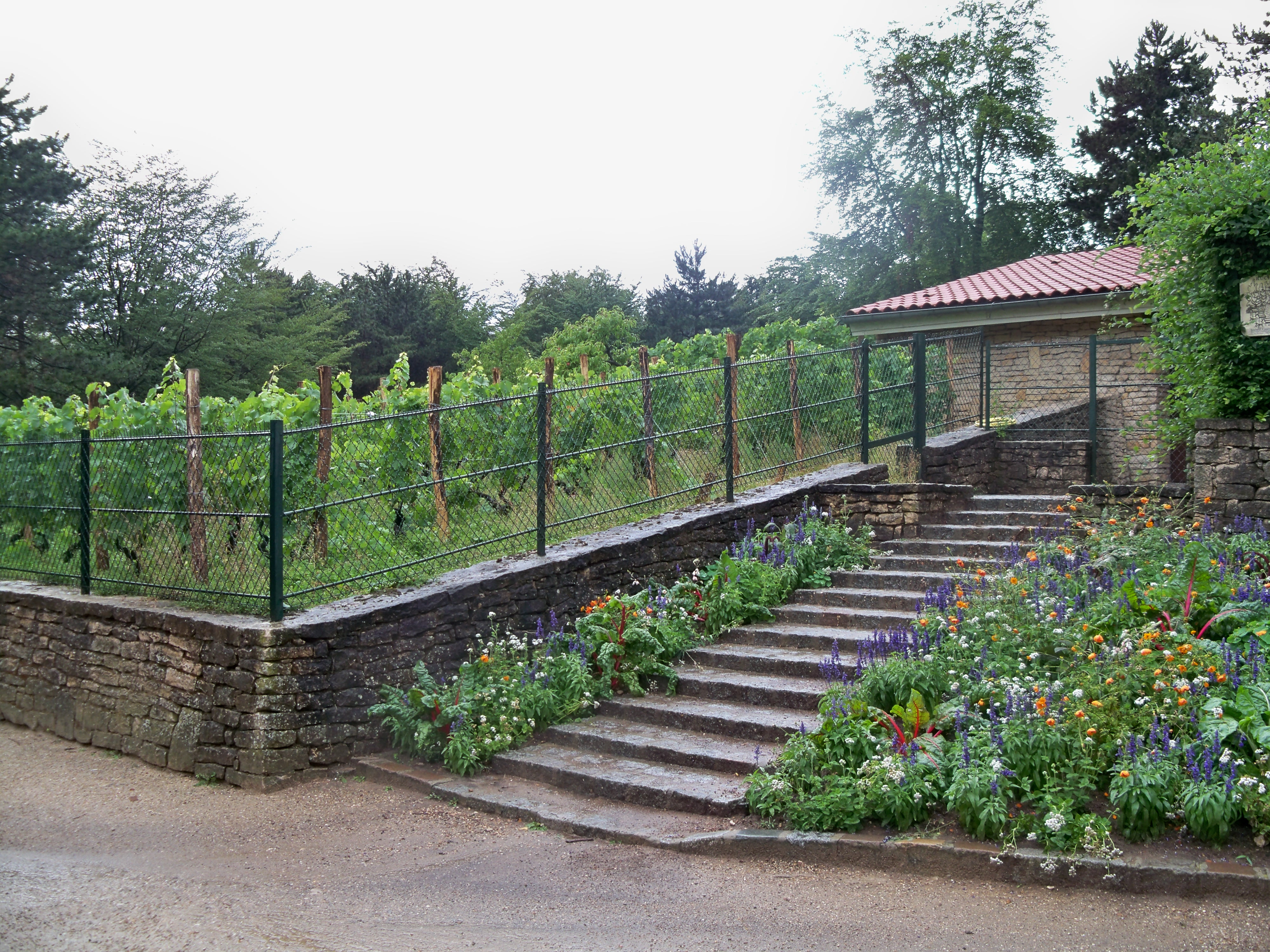
The park has its own vineyard on the hillside

The central feature of the park is a large pond, bordered by lawns and groves of trees. The park also has a rose garden and a garden of medicinal and aromatic plants. The sloping hill of the park features a vineyard, a winding stream, and a jumble of artificial stones for children to climb. The highest part of the park is home to a collection of beehives.

The central entrance gates to the park are topped by two sculptures of bulls by Isidore Bonheur, a note to the site's former use as a slaughterhouse. An old gateway is crowned by a bronze horse's head. The old bell tower of the former fish market stands beside the pond, and the former shelter of the horse market is now used on weekends as a market for old books. The park also has a bust of Georges Brassens made in 1989 by the sculptor André Greck.

== See also ==
- History of Parks and Gardens of Paris
- List of parks and gardens in Paris
