= Steven Berkoff =

English actor (born 1937)

- Born: Leslie Steven Berks; 3 August 1937 (age 89); Stepney, London, England
- Education: Webber Douglas Academy of Dramatic Art; L'École Internationale de Théâtre Jacques Lecoq
- Occupations: Actor; playwright; theatre director
- Years active: 1958–present
- Notable work: East (1975); Shakespeare's Villains (1998)
- Spouses: Alison Minto (m. 1970, divorced); Shelley Lee (m. 1976, divorced)
- Partner: Clara Fischer (1989-present)
- Children: 2
- Awards: Total Theatre Lifetime Achievement Award (1997); LA Weekly Theater Award for Solo Performance (2000)
- Berkoff's voice recorded 2012, as part of an audio description of The Shard for VocalEyes
- Website: www.stevenberkoff.com

Steven Berkoff (born Leslie Steven Berks; 3 August 1937) is an English actor, author, playwright, theatre practitioner and theatre director.

As a theatre maker he is recognised for staging work with a heightened performance style known as "Berkovian theatre", which combines elements of physical theatre, total theatre and expressionism. His work has sometimes been viewed as an example of in-yer-face theatre, due to the intense presentation and taboo-breaking material in a number of his plays.

As a screen actor, he is known for his performances in villainous roles, including the portrayals of General Orlov in the James Bond film Octopussy (1983), Victor Maitland in Beverly Hills Cop (1984), Lt. Col. Podovsky in Rambo: First Blood Part II (1985) and Adolf Hitler in War and Remembrance (1988–89).

== Early life ==
Berkoff was born Leslie Steven Berks on 3 August 1937, in Stepney in the East End of London, into a Jewish family, the son of Pauline "Polly" (née Hyman), a housewife, and Alfred "Al" Berks, a tailor. He had an older sister, Beryl, who predeceased him. His grandparents emigrated to England in the 1890s, his paternal grandparents from Romania, and his maternal grandparents from Russia. The family name was originally Berkowitz, but Steven's father anglicised it to Berks in order to aid the family's assimilation into British society. Steven (who had been known as Leslie growing up) later legally changed his surname to Berkoff and went by his middle name.

During World War II, Berkoff, his sister and their mother were evacuated to Luton, Bedfordshire in 1942. In 1947 he and his family emigrated to the United States, sailing from Southampton aboard the Queen Elizabeth to live with relatives of Berkoff's mother in Nyack, New York. However, Berkoff's father struggled to find work, and after a few months the family returned to England. Berkoff attended Raine's Foundation Grammar School (1948–50) and Hackney Downs School (1950–55).

In 1952, he was arrested for stealing a bicycle and was sentenced to three months in borstal. He took drama courses at City Literary Institute (1957–58), trained as an actor at the Webber Douglas Academy of Dramatic Art (1958–59), and later trained in physical theatre and mime at L'École Internationale de Théâtre Jacques Lecoq, graduating in 1965.

== Career ==
=== Theatre ===
Berkoff started his theatre training in the Repertory Company at His Majesty's Theatre in Barrow-in-Furness, for approximately two months, in June and July 1962.

As well as an actor, Berkoff is a noted playwright and theatre director. His earliest plays are adaptations of works by Franz Kafka: The Metamorphosis (1969); In the Penal Colony (1969), and The Trial (1971). In the 1970s and 1980s, he wrote a series of verse plays including East (1975), Greek (1980), and Decadence (1981), followed by West (1983) (later adapted and recorded at Limehouse Studios for transmission on Channel 4 in 1983), Harry's Christmas (Lunch) (also recorded at Limehouse Studios in 1983 but was never transmitted by C4 as it was considered "too dark"), Sink the Belgrano! (1986), Massage (1997), and The Secret Love Life of Ophelia (2001). Berkoff described Sink the Belgrano! as "even by my modest standards... one of the best things I have done".

Drama critic Aleks Sierz describes Berkoff's dramatic style as "In-yer-face theatre":

The language is usually filthy, characters talk about unmentionable subjects, take their clothes off, have sex, humiliate each other, experience unpleasant emotions, become suddenly violent. At its best, this kind of theatre is so powerful, so visceral, that it forces audiences to react: either they feel like fleeing the building or they are suddenly convinced that it is the best thing they have ever seen and want all their friends to see it too. It is the kind of theatre that inspires us to use superlatives, whether in praise or condemnation.

In 1988, Berkoff directed an interpretation of Salome by Oscar Wilde, performed in slow motion, at the Gate Theatre, Dublin. For his first directorial job at the UK's Royal National Theatre, Berkoff revived the play with a new cast at the Lyttelton Auditorium; it opened in November 1989. In 1998, his solo play Shakespeare's Villains premièred at London's Haymarket Theatre and was nominated for a Society of London Theatre Laurence Olivier Award for Best Entertainment.

In a 2010 interview with guest presenter Emily Maitlis on The Andrew Marr Show, Berkoff stated that he found it "flattering" to play evil characters, saying that the best actors assumed villainous roles.

In 2011, Berkoff revived a previously performed one-man show at the Hammersmith Riverside Studios, titled One Man. It consisted of two monologues; the first was an adaptation of Edgar Allan Poe's short story "The Tell-Tale Heart", the second a piece called Dog, written by Berkoff, which was a comedy about a loud-mouthed football fan and his dog. In 2013, Berkoff performed his play An Actor's Lament at the Sinden Theatre in Tenterden, Kent; it is his first verse play since Decadence in 1981. His 2018 one-act play Harvey deals with the story of Harvey Weinstein.

=== Film ===
In film, Berkoff has played villains such as Soviet General Orlov in the James Bond film Octopussy (1983), the corrupt art dealer Victor Maitland in Beverly Hills Cop (1984), the Soviet officer Lieutenant Colonel Podovsky in Rambo: First Blood Part II (1985), and gangster George Cornell in The Krays (1990). Berkoff has stated that he accepts roles in Hollywood only to subsidise his theatre work, and that he regards many of the films in which he has appeared as lacking artistic merit.

In the Stanley Kubrick films A Clockwork Orange (1971) and Barry Lyndon (1975), Berkoff played, respectively, a police officer and a gambler aristocrat. His other films include the Hammer film Prehistoric Women (1967), Nicholas and Alexandra (1971), The Passenger (1975), Joseph Andrews (1977), McVicar (1980), Outland (1981), Coming Out of the Ice (1982), Underworld (1985), Revolution (1985), Absolute Beginners (1986), Prince's film Under the Cherry Moon (1986), Prisoner of Rio (1988), the Australian film Flynn (1993), Fair Game (1995), and Legionnaire (1998).

Berkoff was the main character voice in Expelling the Demon (1999), a short animation with music by Nick Cave. It received the award for Best Debut at the KROK International Animated Films Festival. He has a cameo in the 2008 film The Cottage. Berkoff appeared in the 2010 British gangster film The Big I Am as "The MC", and in the same year, portrayed the antagonist in The Tourist. Berkoff portrayed Dirch Frode, attorney to Henrik Vanger (Christopher Plummer), in David Fincher's 2011 adaptation of The Girl with the Dragon Tattoo. Another 2011 credit is the independent film Moving Target. He also stars in Decline of an Empire (2014) playing the role of Liberius. In 1994, he both appeared in and directed the film version of his verse play Decadence.

=== Television ===
In television, Berkoff had early roles in episodes of The Avengers, The Saint and UFO episodes "The Cat with Ten Lives" and "Destruction'. Other TV credits include: Hagath, in the episode "Business as Usual" of Star Trek: Deep Space Nine; Stilgar, in the mini-series Children of Dune; gangster Mr. Wiltshire in one episode of Hotel Babylon; Dr. Paul Jorry in the episode "Deadline" of Space Precinct; lawyer Freddie Eccles in "By the Pricking of My Thumbs", an episode of Agatha Christie's Marple; and Adolf Hitler in the mini-series War and Remembrance. In 1998, he made a guest appearance in the Canadian TV series La Femme Nikita (in the episode "In Between"). In 2006, he played celebrity/criminal Ray Cook in the New Tricks episode "Bank Robbery".

In 2010, Berkoff played former Granada Television chairman Sidney Bernstein for the BBC Four drama, The Road to Coronation Street. In the same year, he presented the BBC Horizon episode "To Infinity and Beyond". He has played the historical Florentine preacher Girolamo Savonarola in two separate TV productions: the 1990 TV film A Season of Giants and the 2011 series The Borgias. Berkoff appears as himself in the "Science" episode of the British current affairs satire Brass Eye (1997), warning against the dangers of the fictional environmental disaster "Heavy Electricity". In September 2012, Berkoff appeared in the Doctor Who episode "The Power of Three".

In 2014, Berkoff played a supporting role in the second season of the Lifetime TV show Witches of East End as King Nikolaus, the patriarch of the Beauchamp family.

In 2016, he appeared in series 3, episode 1 of the Channel 4 sitcom Man Down as Mr. Klackov, a "terrifying" caretaker with an Eastern European accent "who makes covering [series protagonist] Dan's mistakes even more complicated" when his job as a schoolteacher is threatened.

=== Other work ===
In 1996, Berkoff appeared as the Master of Ceremonies in a BBC Radio 2 concert version of Kander and Ebb's Cabaret. He provided the voice-over for the N-Trance single "The Mind of the Machine", which rose to No. 15 in the UK singles chart in August 1997. He appeared in the opening sequence to Sky Sports' coverage of the 2007 Heineken Cup Final, modelled on a speech by Al Pacino in the film Any Given Sunday (1999).

Berkoff voices the character General Lente, commander of the Helghan Third Army, in Killzone. He provides motion capture and voice performance for the PlayStation 3 game Heavenly Sword, as General Flying Fox.

Berkoff's 2015 novel Sod the Bitches was described by Guardian critic Stuart Jeffries as "a kind of Philip Roth-like romp through the sex life of a libidinous actor". His 2014 memoir Bad Guy! Journal of a Hollywood Turkey records his time working on a Hollywood blockbuster.

Berkoff appeared in the British Heart Foundation's two-minute public service advertisement, Watch Your Own Heart Attack, broadcast on ITV in August 2008. He also presented two episodes of the BBC Two Horizon episodes: "To Infinity and Beyond..." (2010) and "The Power of the Placebo" (2014).

He is a patron of Brighton's Nightingale Theatre, a fringe theatre venue.

=== Critical assessment ===
According to Annette Pankratz in her 2005 Modern Drama review of Steven Berkoff and the Theatre of Self-Performance by Robert Cross: "Steven Berkoff is one of the major minor contemporary dramatists in Britain and – due to his self-fashioning as a bad boy of British theatre and the ensuing attention of the media – a phenomenon in his own right." Pankratz further asserts that Cross "focuses on Berkoff's theatre of self-performance: that is, the intersections between Berkoff, the public phenomenon and Berkoff, the artist."

== Personal life ==
Berkoff married Alison Minto in 1970, and Shelley Lee in 1976; both marriages ended in divorce. He lives with his partner Clara Fischer, a German pianist, in Limehouse, east London. Fischer appeared onscreen with Berkoff in his film Decadence. He has two daughters from previous relationships.

=== Defamation lawsuit ===
In 1996, Berkoff won Berkoff v Burchill, a libel civil action that he brought against Sunday Times journalist Julie Burchill after she published comments suggesting that he was "hideously ugly". The judge ruled for Berkoff, finding that Burchill's actions "held him to ridicule and contempt."

=== Political and religious views ===
Berkoff has spoken and written about how he believes Jews and Israel to be regarded in Britain. In a January 2009 interview with The Jewish Chronicle, in which he discussed anti-Israel sentiment in the aftermath of the Gaza War, he said:

There is an in-built dislike of Jews. Overt antisemitism goes against the British sense of fair play. It has to be covert and civilised. So certain playwrights and actors on the left wing make themselves out to be stricken with conscience. They say: 'We hate Israel, we hate Zionism, we don't hate Jews.' But Zionism is the very essence of what a Jew is. Zionism is the act of seeking sanctuary after years and years of unspeakable outrages against Jews. As soon as Israel does anything over the top it's always the same old faces who come out to demonstrate. I don't see hordes of people marching down the street against Mugabe when tens of thousands are dying every month in Zimbabwe.

Interviewer Simon Round noted that Berkoff was also keen to express his view that right-wing Israeli politicians, such as Ariel Sharon and Benjamin Netanyahu, were "wretched". Asked if British antisemitism manifested itself in theatre, Berkoff responded: "They quite like diversity and will tolerate you as long as you act a bit Gentile and don't throw your chicken soup around too much. You are perfectly entitled occasionally even to touch the great prophet of British culture, Shakespeare, as long as you keep your Jewishness well zipped up." Berkoff also referred to the Gaza war as a factor in writing Biblical Tales: "It was the recent 'Gaza' war and the appalling flack that Israel received that prompted me to investigate ancient Jewish values."

Speaking to The Jewish Chronicle in May 2010, Berkoff criticised the Bible but added, "it inspires the Jews to produce Samsons and heroes and to have pride". Berkoff went on to say of the Talmud in the same article: "As Jews, we are so incredibly lucky to have the Talmud, to have a way of re-interpreting the Torah. So we no longer cut off hands, and slay animals, and stone women."

In a Daily Telegraph travel article written while visiting Israel in 2007, Berkoff described Melanie Phillips' book Londonistan: How Britain Is Creating a Terror State Within, as "quite overwhelming in its research and common sense. It grips me throughout the journey."

In 2012, Berkoff, with others, wrote in support of Israel's national theatre, Habima, performing in London.

In 2015, Berkoff expressed his view that white actors should be allowed to play the classic Shakespearean role of Othello, referring to any efforts to restrict the character's casting as "racism in reverse".

== References in popular culture ==
- In the 1989 romantic comedy The Tall Guy, struggling actor Dexter King (Jeff Goldblum) auditions unsuccessfully for an imaginary "Berkoff play" called England, My England. In the audition, characters dressed as skinheads swear repetitively at each other and a folding table is kicked over. Afterwards, Dexter's agent Mary (Anna Massey) muses, "I think he's probably mad ..."
- "I'm scared of Steven Berkoff" is a line in the lyrics of the song "I'm Scared" by Queen guitarist Brian May, issued on his 1993 debut solo album Back to the Light. May has declared himself to be an admirer of Berkoff and his wife, Anita Dobson, has appeared in several of Berkoff's plays.

== Filmography ==
=== Film ===
Year	Title	Role	Notes
1958	I Was Monty's Double	Minor role	Uncredited
1958	The Sheriff of Fractured Jaw	Teenage boy	Uncredited
1959	The Captain's Table	Minor role	Uncredited
1959	The Devil's Disciple	British corporal	Uncredited
1960	The Flesh and the Fiends	Medical student	Uncredited
1961	Konga	Student on field trip	Uncredited
1967	Prehistoric Women	John	
1969	Vendetta for the Saint	Bertoli	
1971	Nicholas and Alexandra	Pankratov	
1971	A Clockwork Orange	Det. Const. Tom	
1975	The Passenger	Stephen	
1975	Barry Lyndon	Lord Ludd	
1977	Joseph Andrews	Greasy Fellow	
1980	McVicar	Ronnie Harrison	
1981	Outland	Sagan	
1982	Coming Out of the Ice	Atoman	
1983	Octopussy	General Orlov	
1984	Beverly Hills Cop	Victor Maitland	
1985	Rambo: First Blood Part II	Lieutenant Colonel Sergei T. Podovsky	
1985	Underworld	Hugo Motherskille	
1985	Revolution	Sgt. Jones	
1986	Absolute Beginners	The Fanatic	
1986	Under the Cherry Moon	Isaac Sharon	
1988	Prisoner of Rio	Jack McFarland	
1990	The Krays	George Cornell	
1993	Flynn	Klaus Reicher	
1994	Decadence	Steve / Les / Helen's Couturier	
1995	Fair Game	Colonel Ilya Pavel Kazak	
1997	Love in Paris	Vittorio DaSilva	
1998	Legionnaire	Sgt. Steinkampf	
2000	Rancid Aluminium	Mr. Kant	
2001	Beginner's Luck	Magic Bob	
2002	Steal	Surtayne	
2002	9 Dead Gay Guys	Jeff	
2002	Bokshu – The Myth	Professor Metcalf	
2003	Headrush	The Uncle	
2004	Action Man: Robot Atak	Dr. X	Voice
2004	Charlie	Charlie Richardson Snr.	
2004	Head in the Clouds	Charles Bessé	
2004	Brides	Karabulat	
2005	The Headsman	Inquisitor	
2005	Forest of the Gods	Commandant Hoppe	
2006	The Flying Scotsman	Ernst Hagemann	
2006	Pu-239	Starkov	
2007	Say It in Russian	Oleg Rozhin	
2007	Medvezhya okhota		
2008	The Cottage	Arnie	
2009	At World's End	Jack Pudovski	
2009	44 Inch Chest	Tippi Gordon	
2010	Perfect Life	The Elder	
2010	The Big I Am	The MC	
2010	Just for the Record	Mike Rosferry	
2010	Dead Cert	Kenneth Mason	
2010	The Tourist	Reginald Shaw	
2010	The Rapture	The Controller	
2011	Moving Target	Lawrence Masters	
2011	Big Fat Gypsy Gangster	Guru Shah	
2011	The Girl with the Dragon Tattoo	Dirch Frode	
2012	Strippers vs Werewolves	Flett	
2013	Red 2	Cobb	
2014	Fall of an Empire	Liberius	
2014	We Still Kill the Old Way	Charlie Archer	
2015	North v South	Vic Clarke	
2015	Remembering Nigel	Steven Berkoff	Cameo
2015	7 Cases	Lawson	
2015	Rise of the Footsoldier Part II: Reign of the General	Dr. Flint	
2016	Manhattan Night	Sebastian Hobbs	
2016	Titanium White	Father Tornatore	
2017	Riot	Chief Constable	
2017	Transhuman	Til	
2017	London Heist	Alfie	
2017	Fanged Up	Governor Payne	
2017	The Dot Man	General West	
2018	Point of No Return	Evans	
2019	Tell Tale Heart	Edmund	
2019	Red Devil	Lazarus	
2019	The Last Faust	Dr. Goodfellow	
2020	Righteous Villains	Grandfather	
2021	Creation Stories	Aleister Crowley	
2021	Alice, Through the Looking	The Executive Producer	
2022	Exorcist Vengeance	Bishop Canelo	
2022	Prizefighter: The Life of Jem Belcher	Walter	
2023	Young, Sexy & Dead	Claudio Vestiques	
2023	The Performance	Sam	
2024	The Phantom Warrior	Hades	
2024	The Can	Mason	
2025	Desperate Journey	Raphael	
2026	The Internship	Dimitri Lebedev	
TBA	The Sacrifice		Post-production

=== Television ===
Year	Title	Role	Notes
1959	The Third Man	Toni Da Costa	Episode: "Toys of the Dead"
1959	The Four Just Men	Second Student	Episode: "Panic Button"
1960	The Four Just Men	Workman	Episode: "Treviso Dam"
1963	Corrigan Blake	Barman	Episode: "Love Bird"
1963	Moonstrike	Gunther	Episode: "A Matter of Trust"
1964	Festival	Messenger	Episode: "Murder in the Cathedral"
1964	Hamlet at Elsinore	Lucianus	TV film
1964	ITV Play of the Week	Pestryakov	Episode: "Crime and Punishment"
1965	The Wednesday Play	Councillor	Episode: "Sir Jocelyn, the Minister Would Like a Word..."
1965	The Wednesday Play	Private Gutkowski	Episode: "The Pistol"
1965	The Avengers	Sager	Episode: "The Gravediggers"
1965	An Enemy of the State	Defence Counsel	2 episodes
1967	Vendetta	Spiru	Episode: "The Lady's Man"
1967	Softly, Softly	PC Archer	Episode: "The Informant: Part 1: Rough Justice"
1967	Vendetta	Niccolo	Episode: "The Lady's Man"
1967	The Newcomers	Poulton	Episode: #1.196
1967	Dixon of Dock Green	Dave Banks	Episode: "The Climber"
1968	The Champions	Carlos	Episode: "The Iron Man"
1969	The Saint	Bertoli	2 episodes
1969	The Saint	Carl	Episode: "The Man Who Gambled with Life"
1970–1971	UFO	Captain Steve Minto	4 episodes
1971	The Expert	Mike Barratt	Episode: "The Coat"
1971	Thirty-Minute Theatre	Bert	Episode: "Psychological Warfare"
1981	Play for Today	Kozlov	Episode: "Beloved Enemy"
1982	Coming Out of the Ice	Atoman	TV film
1983	The Professionals	Krasnov	Episode: "A Man Called Quinn"
1986	Sins	Karl Von Eiderfeld	All 3 episodes
1988–1989	War and Remembrance	Adolf Hitler	11 episodes
1989	Theatre Night	Mr. Samsa	Episode: "Metamorphosis"
1990	A Season of Giants	Girolamo Savonarola	TV film
1991	The Tell-Tale Heart	The Man	TV film
1992	Intruders	Addison Leach	Both 2 episodes
1994	Space Precinct	Dr. Paul Jorry	Episode: "Deadline"
1997	Star Trek: Deep Space Nine	Hagath	Episode: "Business as Usual"
1998	La Femme Nikita	Charles Sand / Carlo Giraldi	Episode: "In Between"
2000	Randall & Hopkirk (Deceased)	The Mouth	Episode: "Mental Apparition Disorder"
2000	In the Beginning	Potiphar	Both 2 episodes
2001	Attila the Hun	King Rua	Both 2 episodes
2001	Jonathan Creek	Herman Grole	Episode: "Satan's Chimney"
2002	NCS: Manhunt	George Rolf	2 episodes
2003	Children of Dune	Stilgar	All 3 episodes
2003	Seven Wonders of the Industrial World	John A. Roebling	Episode: "The Brooklyn Bridge"
2003	Hans Christian Andersen: My Life as a Fairytale	Meisling	TV film
2006	Marple	Mr. Eccles	Episode: "By the Pricking of My Thumbs"
2006	Hotel Babylon	Mr. Wiltshire	Episode: #1.8
2006	New Tricks	Ray Cook	Episode: "Bank Robbery"
2008	Ten: Umbra Mortis	Conrad	TV film
2010	The Road to Coronation Street	Sidney Bernstein	TV film
2011–2012	The Borgias	Girolamo Savonarola	8 episodes
2012	Doctor Who	Shakri	Episode: "The Power of Three"
2014	Witches of East End	King Nikolaus	5 episodes
2015	The Frankenstein Chronicles	William Blake	2 episodes
2016	Barbarians Rising	Augustus	2 episodes
2016	Man Down	Mr. Klackov	2 episodes
2018	Lore	Dr. Kristoff Brehovy	Episode: "Prague Clock: The Curse of the Orloj"
2019–2020	Vikings	King Olaf the Stout	12 episodes

== Works as author (incomplete) ==
Plays

- In the Penal Colony (1968) - adaptation of the Franz Kafka short story of the same name.
- Metamorphosis (1969) - adaptation of the Franz Kafka novella of the same name.
- The Trial (1970) - adaptation of the Franz Kafka novel of the same name.
- Agamemnon (1973) - adaptation of Aeschylus's play of the same name.
- Miss Julie versus Expressionism - adaptation of August Strindberg's play Miss Julie.
- Fall of the House of Usher (1974) - adaptation of the Edgar Allan Poe short story of the same name.
- East (1975)
- Greek (1980) - originally written in 1979. Inspired by Oedipus Rex by Sophocles.
- Decadence (1981)
- The Tell-Tale Heart (1981) - adapted from the Edgar Allan Poe short story of the same name.
- West (1983) - originally written in 1978 as a TV play which was later filmed in 1984. Inspired by Beowulf. A companion piece to East.
- Lunch (1983) - originally written in 1966.
- Actor (1985)
- Harry's Christmas (1985)
- Kvetch (1986)
- Sink the Belgrano! (1986) - inspired by the sinking of the ARA General Belgrano.
- Acapulco (1990) - inspired by Berkoff's experience off-set on the film Rambo: First Blood Part II.
- Brighton Beach Scumbags (1991)
- Pitbull later renamed to Dog (1993)
- Massage (1997)
- Shakespeare's Villains (1998) - inspired by and exploring the villains in the plays of William Shakespeare.
- The Bow of Ulysses (2001) - sequel to Lunch.
- Dahling You Were Marvellous (2001) - originally an unproduced television play written in 1989.
- Sturm und Drang
- Messiah - Scenes From A Crucifixion (2000) - inspired by the New Testament.
- Ritual in Blood (2001) - originally written in 1965 under the titles of Hep, Hep, Hep and Blood Accusation.
- The Secret Love Life of Ophelia (2001) - reworking of Shakespeare's Hamlet.
- Sit and Shiver (2004)
- Purgatory (2009)
- Biblical Tales (2010) - consisting of four short plays adapted from stories from the Old Testament:
  Adam and Eve,
  Samson and Delilah,
  David and Goliath,
  Moses and Pharaoh
- Oedipus (2011) - a version of Oedipus Rex by Sophocles.
- Six actors in Search of a Director (2012)
- Religion & Anarchy (2013) - consisting of five short plays about Jews and the Holocaust:
  Guilt,
  Roast,
  Line-up,
  How to Train an Anti-Semite,
  Gas
- An Actor's Lament (2013)
- Harvey - inspired by the Harvey Weinstein scandal and performed as a work-in-progress in 2019.

Film

- West (1984) - TV movie written by Berkoff.
- Metamorphosis - TV adaptation for Theatre Night of Berkoff's play of the same name. Also feature's Berkoff playing the role of Mr. Samsa.
- Silent Night (1991) - TV film starring Berkoff, based on his one-man-play Harry's Christmas.
- 7th November 1938 (1991) - short documentary film from the series The Day the World Changed. Presented by Berkoff talking about an important historical event of his choosing, which is Herschel Grynszpan's assassination of the German diplomat Ernst vom Rath.
- Decadence (1994) - film written, directed by and starring Berkoff, based on his play of the same name.
- Eat Dollink! (2017) - documentary written by and starring Berkoff.
- Venice Beach (2017) - documentary directed, produced, written by and starring Berkoff.
- Shakespeare's Heroes and Villains (2019) - documentary written by and starring Berkoff, based on his one-man-play Shakespeare's Villains.
- Steven Berkoff's Tell Tale Heart (2019) - film starring Berkoff and adapted by Stephen Cookson from Berkoff's one-man-play The Tell-Tale-Heart.
- Brighton (2021) - film adapted by Stephen Cookson from Berkoff's play Brighton Beach Scumbags.

Memoirs and essays

- Steven Berkoff's America (1988) - poetry and essays.
- I am Hamlet (1989) - based on Berkoff's working journal of his 1979 production of Shakespeare's Hamlet.
- A Prisoner in Rio (1989) - Berkoff's diary whilst filming the movie Prisoner of Rio.
- Coriolanus in Deutschland (1992) - Berkoff's journal of directing Shakespeare's Coriolanus in Munich.
- Overview (1994) - memories of Berkoff's travels around the world.
- Meditations on Metamorphosis (1995) - Berkoff's analysis of his various stage productions of Kafka's Metamorphosis.
- Free Association (1996) - autobiography.
- Shopping in the Santa Monica Mall (2000)
- Tough Acts (2003) - memoirs of working with various high-profile actors and directors.
- My Life in Food (2007) - Berkoff's memoirs about food.
- Diary of a Juvenile Delinquent (2010) - autobiography.
- Tales from an Actor's Life (2011) - autobiographical stories told in the third person.
- Richard II in New York (2008) - writing on Berkoff's experience of directing Shakespeare's Richard II in New York.
- A World Elsewhere (2019) - writings on Berkoff's work as an actor, director and playwright.

Short stories

- Gross Intrusion and other stories (1979)
- Graft: Tales of an Actor (1998) - semi-autobiographical short stories.

Published poetry

- Steven Berkoff's America (1988) - poetry and essays.
- Requiem for Ground Zero (2002) - inspired by the September 11 attacks.
- You Remind Me of Marilyn Monroe (2009)
- Poems for the Working Class (2021)

Novel

- Sod the Bitches! (2015)

Photography books

- The Theatre of Steven Berkoff (1992) - photographs of a variety of Berkoff's theatre productions, featuring written commentary by Berkoff.
- East End Photographs (2012)
- Gorbals 1966 (2018) - photographs of the Gorbals area of Glasgow during Berkoff's time working at the Citizens Theatre

== Awards and honours ==
Year	Award	Category	Nominee	Result	Ref.
2017	UK Film Festival	Best Actor	Tell Tale Heart	Won	
2004	Helen Hayes Awards	Outstanding Lead Actor, Non-Resident Production	Shakespeare's Villains at the Studio Theatre, Washington, D.C.	Nominated	
2001	Bank of Scotland Herald Angel		The Secret Love Life of Ophelia at the Edinburgh Festival Fringe 2001	Won	
2000	Scotsman Fringe First Award		Messiah, Scenes from a Crucifixion at the Edinburgh Festival Fringe	Won	
2000	LA Weekly Theater Award	Award for Solo Performance	Shakespeare's Villains at Odyssey Theatre Ensemble	Won	
1999	Stage Awards for Acting Excellence	Stage Award for Best Ensemble work at the Edinburgh Festival Fringe	25th-anniversary revival of East	Won	
1999	Laurence Olivier Awards	Best Family Show	Shakespeare's Villains at the Theatre Royal Haymarket	Nominated	
1997	Total Theatre Awards	Lifetime Achievement Award	Steven Berkoff	Won	
1994	Evening Standard Drama Awards	Best Comedy	Brighton Beach Scumbags	Nominated	
1992	Laurence Olivier Awards	Best Theatre Choreographer	The Trial at the Lyttelton at The National Theatre	Nominated	
1992	Laurence Olivier Awards	The Observer Award for Outstanding Achievement	Kvetch at the Garrick Theatre, London	Nominated	
1991	Evening Standard Theatre Awards	Best Comedy	Kvetch	Won	
1991	Evening Standard Theatre Awards	Best Director	The Trial	Nominated	
1980	The New Standard British Film Awards	Most Promising Newcomer (Actor)	Steven Berkoff for his portrayal of Ronnie Harrison in McVicar	Nominated	

Honours

The Berkoff Performing Arts Centre at Alton College, Hampshire, is named for Berkoff. Attending the Alton College ceremony to honour him, he stated:

I remember in my younger days questioning what life means. Finding a place like the Berkoff Performing Arts Centre, I found myself as a person. Having a place like this sowed the seeds of the man I think I am today. A place like this is the first step in changing the life of a person. There's something about theatre that draws people together because it's something connected with the human soul. All over the UK, the performing arts links people with a shared humanity as a way to open the doors to the mysteries of life. We should never underestimate the power of the theatre. It educates, informs, enlightens and humanises us all.
