= Nickleby =

Nickleby may refer to:

- Nicholas Nickleby; or, The Life and Adventures of Nicholas Nickleby, a novel by Charles Dickens
- Empire Nickleby, a coastal tanker

See also: Nicholas Nickleby (disambiguation)
