= Nicholas Nickleby (disambiguation) =

Nicholas Nickleby is a novel by Charles Dickens published as a serial from 1838 to 1839.

Nicholas Nickleby may also refer to several adaptations of the novel:

- Nicholas Nickleby (1903 film), directed by Alf Collins
- Nicholas Nickleby (1912 film)
- The Life and Adventures of Nicholas Nickleby (1947 film)
- Nicholas Nickleby (1957 TV series), a BBC adaptation
- Nicholas Nickleby (1968 TV series), a BBC adaptation
- Nicholas Nickleby (1977 TV series), a BBC adaptation
- The Life and Adventures of Nicholas Nickleby (play), a 1980 stage adaptation
- The Life and Adventures of Nicholas Nickleby (1982 film) a TV film of the stage adaptation
- The Life and Adventures of Nicholas Nickleby (2001 film)
- Nicholas Nickleby (2002 film)
