= Emily Richard =

British actress (1948–2024)

- Born: Anne Richards; 25 January 1948; London, England
- Died: 2 October 2024 (aged 76); Lewes, East Sussex, England
- Other name: Emily Petherbridge
- Education: Channing School
- Alma mater: Webber Douglas School of Singing and Dramatic Art
- Occupation: Actress
- Years active: 1968–2007
- Spouse: Edward Petherbridge
- Children: 2

Emily Richard (born Anne Richards; 25 January 1948 – 2 October 2024) was a British actress and a member of the Royal Shakespeare Company.

One of three sisters, Richard was born in London, where she attended drama school in 1966, aged 18, but she was asked to leave after a year as she was "too timid". She then sold programmes in theatres in London's West End. Having acquired an agent, her first professional role was as Mole in a theatre production of Toad of Toad Hall. A member of the BBC Radio Repertory Company, Richard worked extensively for radio and once played 'Tess' in Tess of the d'Urbervilles in that medium.

== Early life ==
Anne Richards grew up in north London, the second of three daughters born to merchant navy ship captain Ronald Richards and his wife Nancy (née Brooks), a fashion consultant. She was educated at Channing School in Highgate before moving onto a brief spell at secretarial college. She then joined the Webber Douglas School of Singing and Dramatic Art but left after one year, having been told that she was too timid for the stage.

In spite of this rejection, she found success as Mole in a 1968 touring production of Toad of Toad Hall. From this she earned her Equity card and changed her name to Emily Richard.

== Theatre ==
In 1971, Richard appeared at the Apollo Theatre in Charley's Aunt with Tom Courtenay, and in 1978 she appeared in Chekhov's The Three Sisters and Shakespeare's Twelfth Night in a small British tour for the Royal Shakespeare Company, with Ian McKellen, Edward Petherbridge, Roger Rees, Rose Hill and Bob Peck. In 1982 she appeared at the Open Air Theatre in London's Regent's Park in Shaw's The Admirable Bashville and The Dark Lady of the Sonnets, and in Shakespeare's A Midsummer Night's Dream and The Taming of the Shrew. Also in 1982 Richard appeared in Shakespeare's Twelfth Night at the Donmar Warehouse in London with Ian McKellen, Edward Petherbridge and Edward Hardwicke.

For the Royal Shakespeare Company Richard appeared in Chekhov's The Three Sisters (April 1980) at the Donmar Warehouse with Roger Rees, Edward Petherbridge, Bob Peck and Timothy Spall; and as Kate Nickleby in The Life and Adventures of Nicholas Nickleby (November 1980) at the Aldwych Theatre, an epic eight-hour stage adaptation of Charles Dickens' novel Nicholas Nickleby with Roger Rees, Timothy Spall, John Woodvine, Edward Petherbridge, Ben Kingsley, Fulton Mackay, David Threlfall, Bob Peck, Rose Hill and Christopher Benjamin.

In June 1981 she reprised her role as Kate Nickleby in The Life and Adventures of Nicholas Nickleby for the Royal Shakespeare Company with Alun Armstrong and Ian McNeice added to the cast, Ben Kingsley and Timothy Spall having left the production. This version was filmed by Channel 4 in 1982 and broadcast as four two-hour episodes on consecutive nights in November 1982. She appeared in the play during its fourteen-week run at the Plymouth Theatre on Broadway, opening on 22 September 1981. Also for the RSC Richard appeared in Shakespeare's Love's Labour's Lost in 1984 at the Royal Shakespeare Theatre in Stratford-upon-Avon with Kenneth Branagh, Roger Rees, Edward Petherbridge, Frances Barber and Frank Middlemass, and in a 1993 production of Macbeth at the Barbican Theatre with Derek Jacobi and Cheryl Campbell.

== Film and television ==
Among her film and television appearances are Armchair Theatre (1969), Emmerdale Farm (1973), Father Brown (1974), The Glittering Prizes (1976), Lorna Doone (1976), Enemy at the Door (1978–80), Angels (1982), The Life and Adventures of Nicholas Nickleby (1982), The Cleopatras (1983), The Dark Side of the Sun (1983), Oscar (as Constance Wilde) (1985), Casualty (1996) and Wycliffe (1997). Her films include Hansel and Gretel (1987), and Empire of the Sun (1987) directed by Steven Spielberg, and in which she played Mary Graham, the mother of Jim (Christian Bale). In 1976 she was one of sixty actresses who auditioned for the role of Leela in Doctor Who. Although she was the first choice of producer Philip Hinchcliffe, she was unavailable, and the role went to Louise Jameson.

== Personal life and death ==
Richard was married to actor Edward Petherbridge, with whom she appeared in Nicholas Nickleby for the Royal Shakespeare Company in 1980, as well as in the Lord Peter Wimsey play Busman's Honeymoon (1988), and in Pomp and Circumstance. They had two children.

Richard died on 2 October 2024, at the age of 76.
