= Hansel and Gretel (1987 film) =

- Videotape cover
- Directed by: Len Talan
- Screenplay by: Nancy Weems, Len Talan
- Based on: Hansel and Gretel by Brothers Grimm; Hansel and Gretel (opera) by Engelbert Humperdinck
- Produced by: Yoram Globus; Menahem Golan
- Starring: David Warner; Hugh Pollard; Nicola Stapleton; Emily Richard; Cloris Leachman
- Cinematography: Ilan Rosenberg
- Edited by: Irit Raz
- Music by: Engelbert Humperdinck
- Production company: Golan-Globus Productions
- Distributed by: The Cannon Group, Inc.
- Release dates: May 1987 (France: Cannes Film Market); 10 December 1988 (US: video premiere)
- Running time: 84 minutes
- Countries: United States, Israel
- Language: English

Hansel and Gretel (alternatively: Cannon Movie Tales: Hansel and Gretel) is a 1987 fantasy musical film, part of the 1980s film series titled Cannon Movie Tales. It is directed by Len Talan and stars David Warner, Cloris Leachman, Hugh Pollard and Nicola Stapleton.

The screenplay, as well as all featured songs, are based and adapted from Engelbert Humperdinck's well-known opera of the same name. Other film adaptations also arose from the same piece.

== Plot ==
Hansel (Hugh Pollard) and Gretel (Nicola Stapelton) are the offspring of an impoverished woodcutter (David Warner) and his wife (Emily Richard). After being told to leave their home by their mother, Hansel and Gretel wrongly walk into the Evil Forest Called the "North woods" where they discover a delicious gingerbread house. Unbeknown to them it's a witch named Griselda (Cloris Leachman) that lives there.

== Cast ==
- David Warner as Stefan, Hansel and Gretel's father and Maria's husband
- Hugh Pollard as Hansel, Gretel's brother and Maria and Stefan's son
- Nicola Stapleton as Gretel, Hansel's sister and Maria and Stefan's daughter
- Emily Richard as Maria, Hansel and Gretel's mother and Stefan's wife
- Cloris Leachman as Griselda the Witch
- Susie Miller as Marta
- Eugene Kline as Farmer
- Warren Feigin as the Baker
- Josh Buland as the Baker's Boy
- Lutuf Nouasser as the Blacksmith
- Beatrice Shimshoni as the Ribbon Lady
- Daniel Dickman as the Gingerbread Boy
- Assaf M : child dancer, singer and nose picker

== Music ==
- "Punch and Judy's Dance"

Music by Engelbert Humperdinck
from opera "Hänsel und Gretel"
Music adaptation by Michael Cohen
Lyrics by Enid Futterman and Nancy Weems
Performed by Punch, Judy, and Children

- "Punch and Judy's Dance (Reprise)"

Music by Engelbert Humperdinck
from opera "Hänsel und Gretel"
Music adaptation by Michael Cohen
Lyrics by Enid Futterman and Nancy Weems
Performed by Hugh Pollard and Nicola Stapleton

- "The Fairy Song"

Music by Engelbert Humperdinck
from opera "Hänsel und Gretel"
Music adaptation by Michael Cohen
Lyrics by Enid Futterman
Performed by Nicola Stapleton

- "Oh, What a Day"

Music by Engelbert Humperdinck
from opera "Hänsel und Gretel"
Music adaptation by Michael Cohen
Lyrics by Enid Futterman
Performed by David Warner

- "Sugar and Spice"

Music by Engelbert Humperdinck
from opera "Hänsel und Gretel"
Music adaptation by Michael Cohen
Lyrics by Enid Futterman
Performed by Cloris Leachman

- "The Witch is Dead"

Music by Engelbert Humperdinck
from opera "Hänsel und Gretel"
Music adaptation by Michael Cohen
Lyrics by Enid Futterman and Nancy Weems
Performed by Children

== Production ==
To save money, the Cannon Movie Tales films were shot two or three at a time. Hansel and Gretel was shot simultaneously with Sleeping Beauty (1987). This wasn't the best of situations in that often the two crews would be competing for the limited equipment, costumes, and sets. The limitations of the budget also often made the production values appear less refined compared to major studio films of the time.

There was, allegedly, a lot of debate as to how to destroy the witch's house at the end of the movie. Some wanted to blow it up, but the director Len Talan wanted to take it apart in stop-action, to have it turn to ruins, which was too time-consuming. Finally the construction supervisor, Aria Ben-Yishay, came up with an idea. He contacted the local fire department near the woods where the witch's house had been built and got them to assist the crew by pumping fire-fighting foam through the back of the set and out the windows and roof. Large quantities of food coloring were added, and with a couple of fireballs and colored smoke bombs, they had their scene.

The movie, like all others in the series, were shot on-location in Israel.

== Reception ==
Hansel and Gretel and the Cannon Movie Tales series, in general, received mixed reviews upon release. Critics noted the series’ lower production quality, and some reviews were critical of the campy or theatrical acting styles. Renee Longstreet of Common Sense Media awarded the film two stars out of five.

== See also ==
- List of films about witchcraft
