= The Life and Adventures of Nicholas Nickleby (play) =

Adaptation of Charles Dickens novel

- RSC Aldwych Theatre, 1980 production
- Original language: English
- Written by: Charles Dickens (novel); David Edgar (play)
- Subject: Redemption, social renewal and benevolent capitalism
- Genre: Drama
- Setting: Early 19th century, London England

Premiere
- Date: 1980
- Place: Aldwych Theatre; London, England

The Life and Adventures of Nicholas Nickleby is an 8 1/2-hour-long adaptation of Charles Dickens' 1839 novel, performed in two parts. Part 1 was 4 hours in length with one interval of 15 minutes. Part 2 was 4 1/2 hours in length with two intervals of 12 minutes. It was originally presented onstage over two evenings, or in its entirety from early afternoon with a dinner break. Later it was presented on television over four evenings.

The opening night was on 5 June 1980. The show ran for an 8-week season at the Aldwych Theatre, playing Part 1 on some nights and Part 2 on others with both parts playing together on matinée and evening performances. It was revived for two further 8-week runs at the Aldwych in the autumn season of 1980 and the spring season of 1981 before being filmed for Primetime TV at the Old Vic Theatre and transferring to Broadway for the autumn season of 1981. A further revival with a substantially different cast played at the Royal Shakespeare Theatre in Stratford and toured to Los Angeles and Broadway in 1985.

The play was adapted by David Edgar from the Charles Dickens novel The Life and Adventures of Nicholas Nickleby. Directed by John Caird and Trevor Nunn, the music and lyrics were by Stephen Oliver and the set design was by John Napier and Dermot Hayes. It transferred to the Plymouth Theatre on Broadway, initially opening 4 October 1981 and running until 3 January 1982. Revivals of the original production were produced in 1986 (which returned to USA for a Broadway run and national tour) and a truncated version from 2006 to 2008.

== Productions ==
The original London cast included Roger Rees as Nicholas, David Threlfall as Smike, Alun Armstrong as Squeers, Bob Peck as John Browdie and Sir Mulberry Hawk, John Woodvine as Ralph Nickleby, Susan Littler as Kate, Edward Petherbridge as Newman Noggs, Timothy Spall as Young Wackford and Mr. Folair, John McEnery as Mr. Mantalini, William the Waiter and Mr. Snevellicci, Graham Crowden as Mr. Vincent Crummles, and Suzanne Bertish as Fanny Squeers, Peg Sliderskew and Miss Snevellicci, among many others. All actors apart from Rees played multiple roles. Some parts were recast in November 1980, with Fulton Mackay playing Squeers, Emily Richard taking the role of Kate Nickleby and Christopher Benjamin as Crummles. Fulton Mackay and Timothy Spall had left the company by the time the production was filmed and were replaced by Alun Armstrong and Ian McNeice respectively. When the Aldwych production closed in the summer of 1981 the set was moved to the Old Vic Theatre and the work performed for a four-part mini-series by Channel 4 and Mobil Showcase Theatre., which was telecast in the US in January 1983.

The full-length version of the play was produced by three American companies subsequent to the RSC. The Great Lakes Theatre Festival, formerly Great Lakes Shakespeare Festival in 1982 with a revival in 1983, directed by Edward Stern and Robert Lanchester, and Kansas City Repertory Theater, formerly Missouri Repertory Theater, directed by James Assad and Leon Rubin in 1983. The third production was in February and March 1984 by the students at Herbert Henry Dow High School, Midland, Michigan, directed by J. Michael Reilly.

An Australian production played at the Theatre Royal in Sydney from December 1983 to March 1984, and later in Melbourne and Adelaide from December 1984 to March 1985. It featured John Howard as Nicholas and Tony Taylor as Smike.

The production was revived for the Royal Shakespeare Theatre, Stratford-upon-Avon, in January 1986. A second Broadway production ran from 24 August 1986 to 12 October 1986 at the Broadhurst Theatre and was nominated for the 1987 Tony Award for Best Revival. A production by the Hilberry Theatre was named best play of the 1987–88 season in the Detroit Free Press theater awards.

Despite the play's success, its length and the size of the cast required means that it is seldom revived, although in 2006 Edgar prepared a shorter version for a production at the Chichester Festival, which transferred in December 2007 and January 2008 to the Gielgud Theatre in the West End. The production, directed by Philip Franks and Jonathan Church went on to perform at the Prince of Wales Theatre in Toronto, Canada. This version has been produced in the US by the California Shakespeare Festival, Playmakers Repertory Theater and a production was performed at The Lyric Stage Company of Boston in October – December 2010.

== Critical reception ==
Although audience reception was enthusiastic, critical reception was mixed. Frank Rich in The New York Times reported dull passages piling up as "dead weight", while John Simon in the New York Magazine felt that the work was a "middlebrow enterprise" doing "scant justice" to the novel. In contrast Mel Gussow, again in The New York Times, noted that "Nicholas Nickleby remains true to Dickens – many of the lines are taken directly from the novel, dialogue as well as narration – and to first principles of theater" when describing the RSC's recast production in 1986. Playwright and reviewer Thomas Hischak, writing in retrospect about the 1981–82 New York season, judged the production as the "centerpiece of the season...a theatrical experience of a lifetime" and in London Bernard Levin of The Times found "a ceaselessly entertaining...dramatic triumph" and despaired of the cavils of his fellow critics. He concluded: "…we come out not merely delighted but strengthened, not just entertained but uplifted, not only affected but changed."

== Theme ==
Edgar's writing for the stage is avowedly political and his treatment of Dickens's novel, with its descriptions of poverty and as its central subject matter the wickedness of money-broker Ralph Nickleby, sought to draw parallels between the social conditions of 1830s Britain with what he saw as the growing political climate of selfishness in the 1980s. However, some critics felt that the RSC's ebullient staging, the necessary happy ending (brought about by benevolent capitalism as represented by the Cheeryble brothers) and even the huge commercial success of the play itself diminished the impact of Edgar's message.

== Awards and nominations ==
Awards

- 1980 Laurence Olivier Awards: Play of the year; Director of the year; Designer of the year; Actor of the year in a new play: Roger Rees; Actor of the Year in a Supporting Role: David Threlfall; Actress of the Year in a Supporting Role: Suzanne Bertish.
- 1982 Tony Awards: Best Play; Best Performance by a Leading Actor in a Play: Roger Rees
- 1982 New York Drama Critics' Circle Award for Best Play

Nominations

- 1987 Tony Award for Best Revival of a Play

== Home video ==
Channel 4 filmed the play as it was performed in a theatre, The Old Vic, shortly before the RSC took the show to Broadway. Two extra versions of "the story so far" (which originally recapped part one for theatregoers returning for part two) were written, staged, and filmed, to introduce the second and fourth acts for television.

The company (in alphabetical order):

- Alun Armstrong as Mr. Squeers and Mr. Wagstaff
- Christopher Benjamin as Mr. Vincent Crummles and Walter Bray
- Suzanne Bertish as Milliner, Fanny Squeers, Miss Snevellicci and Peg Sliderskew
- Sharon Bower as Waitress, Rich lady, Milliner, Pitcher, Mr. Kenwigs' sister, Miss Bravassa, and Opera singer
- Janet Dale as Snawney Major, Miss Knag, Mrs. Cutler, Miss Belvawney, Mrs. Wititterley, and Mrs. Snawley
- Jeffery Dench as Mr. Cutler, Landlord, Mr. Blightley, and Arthur Gride
- Jane Downs as Mrs. Nickleby and Miss Green
- Ian East as Milliner, Roberts, and Mr. Crowl
- Nicholas Gecks as Jackson and Lord Frederick Verisopht
- Alan Gill as Graymarsh, George, Keeper and Westwood
- Patrick Godfrey as Irate gentleman, Jennings, Mr. Kenwigs, The man next door and Casino proprietor
- Lucy Gutteridge as Milliner, Sprouter, Young Fiancée, Miss Ledrock and Madeline Bray
- Cathryn Harrison as Milliner, Tilda Price and Miss Henrietta Petowker
- Andrew Hawkins as Mr. Bonney, Coates, Mr. Hetherington, Opera singer, Captain Adams and Policeman
- Rose Hill as Miss La Creevy, Lady from downstairs and Mrs. Grudden
- Roderick Horn as Pugstyles, Mr. Wititterley and Umpire
- Griffith Jones as Flunkey, Old Lord, Mr. Fluggers and Tim Linkinwater
- Lila Kaye as Mrs. Squeers and Mrs. Crummles
- Teddy Kempner as Peters, Benjamin, Master Peter Crummles, Tix and Mr. Pluck
- Timothy Kightley as Flunkey, Mr. Lillyvick, Colonel Chowser and Surgeon
- Shirley King as Rich lady, Mrs. Kenwigs and Mrs. Lenville
- John McEnery as William, Mr. Mantalini, Cobbey and Mr. Snevellicci
- Ian McNeice as Young Wackford Squeers, Scaley and Croupier
- William Maxwell as Mr. Snawley, Milliner, Tomkins and Mr. Pailey
- David Lloyd Meredith as Sir Matthew Pupker and Charles Cheeryble
- Sally Nesbitt as Waitress, Milliner, Phib and Ganzingi
- Bob Peck as John Browdie and Sir Mulberry Hawk
- Edward Petherbridge as Newman Noggs and Hawk's rival
- Clyde Pollitt as Coachman, Mr. Folair and Brooker
- Stephen Rashbrook as Belling, Milliner, Mr. Bane and Alphonse
- Christopher Ravenscroft as Mobbs, Mr. Lenville, Mr. Snobb and Frank Cheeryble
- Hubert Rees as Mr. Curdle and Ned Cheeryble
- Roger Rees as Nicholas Nickleby
- Emily Richard as Kate Nickleby and Mrs. Curdle
- Mark Tandy as Bolder, Master Crummles, Mr. Pyke and Policeman
- David Threlfall as Smike
- Hilary Townley as Hannah, Snawley minor, Milliner, Morleena Kenwigs, The infant phenomenon and Young woman
- Thelma Whiteley as Mrs. Snevellicci, Nurse and Madame Mantalini
- John Woodvine as Ralph Nickleby and Opera singer

== In popular culture ==
In the final episode of Season 3 of the U.S. drama television series The West Wing, the cast of a production of John Barton's The Wars of the Roses performs a rendition of "Patriotic Song" from The Life and Adventures of Nicholas Nickleby. The song is performed almost in its entirety, under the final scene of the episode. Earlier in the same episode, the fictional President Bartlet quotes the chorus of "victorious in war shall be made glorious in peace" as he mulls the decision to commit a political assassination.
