= Margaret Stuart Barry =

British writer (1927–2022)

- Born: Margaret Stuart Bell; 7 December 1927; Richmond, North Yorkshire, England
- Died: 23 September 2022 (aged 94)
- Occupation: Writer
- Writing career
- Notable work: Simon and the Witch

Margaret Stuart Barry (née Bell, 7 December 1927 – 23 September 2022) was an English children's writer, and is best known for creating the Simon and the Witch series of books. She wrote other series for young readers, including the Attic Toys series.

== Biography ==
Margaret Stuart Bell was born on 7 December 1927, and is from Darlington, County Durham. She was schooled in Richmond, North Yorkshire. She died on 23 September 2022, at the age of 94.

== Select bibliography ==
- Boffy and the Teacher Eater (illustrated by George W. Adamson) (1971)
- Woozy (1973)
- Tommy Mac (1974)
- Simon and the Witch (1976)
- Maggie Gumption (1979)
- Tilly Losh, the Rag Doll (1995)
- Moggy the Witch's Cat (1995)
- Oxfam the Unloved Bear (1995)
- Diz and the Big Fat Burglar (1996)
- Prissy the Stuck-Up Doll (1997)
- Mayor Bungle the Mad Old Dog (1997)
