= Simon and the Witch =

Book by Margaret Stuart Barry

- First edition
- Author: Margaret Stuart Barry
- Illustrator: Linda Birch
- Language: English
- Series: Simon and the Witch
- Genre: Children's fantasy
- Publisher: Collins
- Publication date: 23 August 1976
- Publication place: United Kingdom
- Media type: Print
- Pages: 78 pages
- ISBN: 0-00-184749-X
- Followed by: Simon and the Witch in School

Simon and the Witch is a children's book by Margaret Stuart Barry, published by Collins, illustrated by Linda Birch. It also refers to the name of the series, which follows on. Simon is a very sensible young schoolboy, who has a friend who is a real witch. She is very silly, and a huge showoff.

Following a one off dramatisation of the first story in 1985 as part of the Children's BBC series Up Our Street, in 1987 the concept was adapted into a television series, starring Elizabeth Spriggs as the Witch, and Hugh Pollard as Simon, which ran for two series.

== Plot ==
In the first chapter, The Backwards Spell the witch teaches Simon how to turn the school gardener into a frog, but forgets how to turn him back. She eventually remembers the spell, and turns the gardener into a man again, claiming privately she never forgot the spell at all.

In chapter two, The Lost Magic Wand, the witch loses her wand so Simon takes her to the police station where the witch becomes fascinated with Constable Scruff's uniform, and so becomes a policewoman. The three eventually find the witch's wand, which has been stolen by two thieves who used it as a poker for their fire.

In chapter three, The Witch at the Seaside, Simon takes the witch on holiday to the beach for a day, where she makes the English Channel disappear, not believing Simon's assurances that it is not flooding. She agrees to put it back on the condition she is featured on the evening news, which she is.

In The Witch has Measles, chapter four, the witch catches double German measles, so goes to hospital. She sees the trolleys patients are moved round on, and organises races on them, and everyone has so much fun they all feel better and go home again.

In chapter five, Halloween, the witch (who has never heard of Halloween before) goes to a Halloween party, but is disgusted by 'fake' witches. Fortunately, one hundred of her relatives turn up, with their black cats, and they crash the party, demonstrating their magic many times over. The final chapter of the book, The Witch's Visitor, is set at Christmas, the witch makes a snowman come to life, introducing him to people as her Uncle Fred.

== Other books in the series ==
Other books in the Simon and the Witch series are:

- Simon and the Witch in School
- The Return of the Witch
- The Witch and the Holiday Club
- The Millionaire Witch
- The Witch of Monopoly Manor
- The Witch on Holiday
- The Witch V.I.P.

== Television series ==
In 1985, the first of the stories (The Backwards Spell) was dramatised for Children's BBC, and shown as a one-off episode (called "Simon and the Witch") in the second series of Up Our Street, a series of unrelated wacky stories, each with a different cast and writer, linked only by the unnamed 'street' of the title. Desmond Askew and Joanna Monro played the respective title characters.

With the episode being well received, the BBC felt that the concept had potential to be developed as an ongoing Children's BBC series. In 1987, the books were made into a television series for Children's BBC, consisting of twenty-five fifteen minute episodes, starring Elizabeth Spriggs as the Witch, and Hugh Pollard as Simon. Guest stars included Joan Sims, Nicola Stapleton, and Naomie Harris.

First shown on 16 November 1987, the programme ran for two series and proved popular with viewers, pulling in decent ratings for its Children's BBC slot, and with both first and second series later being repeated after their initial airings.

Whilst the end of the second series wrapped up a number of the ongoing storylines, it left the door open for a potential third series. However, due both to the age of star Hugh Pollard and several child co-stars, as well as Children's BBC reassessing their demographic output in 1990, the second series turned out to be the last.
