= The Life and Adventures of Nicholas Nickleby (1982 film) =

- DVD
- Directed by: Jim Goddard
- Screenplay by: David Edgar
- Based on: Nicholas Nickleby by Charles Dickens
- Produced by: Colin Callender
- Starring: Roger Rees; Emily Richard; John Woodvine; David Threlfall; Edward Petherbridge; Suzanne Bertish; Bob Peck
- Cinematography: Tony Imi
- Edited by: Terry Bennell
- Music by: Stephen Oliver
- Production companies: Channel 4, Primetime Television, Ltd., RM Productions, The Royal Shakespeare Company
- Distributed by: Mobil Showcase Network
- Release dates: 7 November 1982 (UK); 10 January 1983 (U.S.)
- Running time: 540 minutes
- Country: United Kingdom
- Language: English

The Life and Adventures of Nicholas Nickleby is a nine-hour adaptation of the novel by Charles Dickens. It is a recording of the stage play by The Royal Shakespeare Company at The Old Vic in London. It was Channel 4's first major drama commission.

== Plot ==
For a detailed plot, see The Life and Adventures of Nicholas Nickleby.

== Cast ==
- Roger Rees as Nicholas Nickleby
- Emily Richard as Kate Nickleby
- Jane Downs as Mrs. Nickleby
- John Woodvine as Ralph Nickleby
- Edward Petherbridge as Newman Noggs
- David Threlfall as Smike
- Alun Armstrong as Wackford Squeers
- Suzanne Bertish as Fanny Squeers
- Bob Peck as John Browdie
- Nicholas Gecks as Lord Verisopht
- Christopher Benjamin as Vincent Crummles
- David Lloyd Meredith as Charles Cheeryble
- Christopher Ravenscroft as Frank Cheeryble
- Jeffrey Dench as Arthur Gride
- Lucy Gutteridge as Madeleine Bray

== Awards ==
This production won the Outstanding Miniseries Primetime Emmy Award. It was also nominated for the following Primetime Emmy awards: Outstanding Achievement in Hairstyling, Outstanding Art Direction for a Limited Series or a Special, and Outstanding Individual Achievement - Graphic Design and Title Sequences. Roger Rees was nominated for Outstanding Lead Actor in a Miniseries or a Movie, David Threlfall was nominated for Outstanding Supporting Actor in a Miniseries or a Movie and David Edgar (playwright) was nominated for Outstanding Writing for a Miniseries, Movie, or Dramatic Special.
