= Christopher Ravenscroft =

English actor (born 1946)

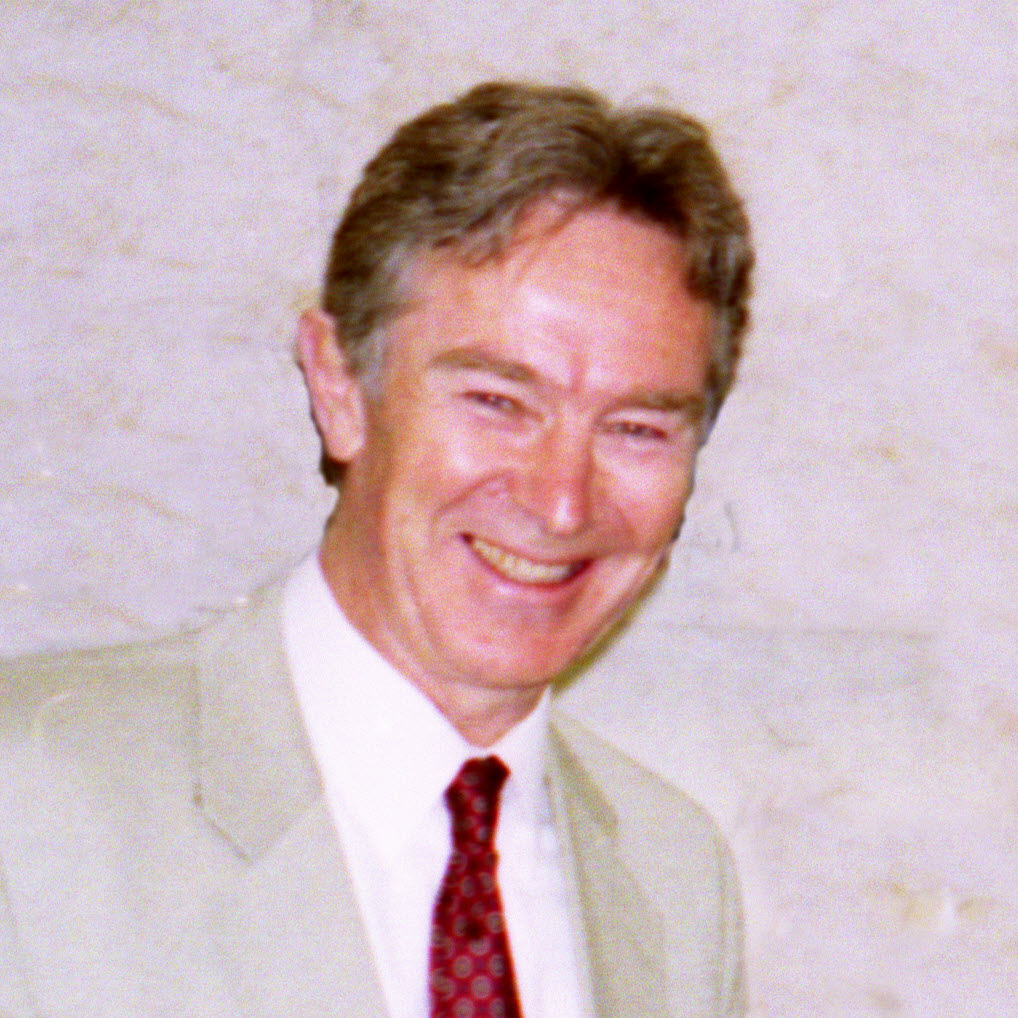
- Ravenscroft in 2002.
- Born: 1946 (age 79–80); Hampstead, London, England
- Occupation: Actor
- Years active: 1974-2019
- Spouse: Caroline Smith

Christopher Ravenscroft (born 1946) is an English actor, best known for his recurring role as DI Mike Burden in The Ruth Rendell Mysteries, the ITV adaptation of Ruth Rendell's Inspector Wexford mysteries.

== Biography ==
Ravenscroft was born in Hampstead, London, and was the star of a number of school plays. He went to London University to study law where he did some more theatre and soon decided that he would rather be an actor than a lawyer, and trained at the Bristol Old Vic Theatre School. While working at the Liverpool Playhouse in the early 1970s he met his future wife, Caroline Smith, who was associate director at the time. He currently lives in Chiswick, West London.

== Filmography ==
=== Film ===
- Henry V (1989) as Montjoy
- Tom and Thomas (2002) as Frederick Lord
- The Football Factory (2004) as Tamara's Father
- The Man Who Knew Infinity (2015) as J.J. Thomson

=== Television ===
- John Halifax, Gentleman (1974) as Edwin
- Coronation Street (1978) as Police Sergeant
- The Hound of the Baskervilles (1982) as Stapleton
- The Life and Adventures of Nicholas Nickleby (1982) as Frank Cheeryble
- The Fourth Arm (1983) as Fudge Bar Vendor
- Twelfth Night (1988) as Orsino
- The Ruth Rendell Mysteries (1987-2000) as Det. Insp. Mike Burden
- Midsomer Murders (2002) as Dr. Rupert Bradshaw
- The Courtroom (2004) as Tim Portland
- The Shell Seekers (2006) as Colonel Mellaby
- Doctors (2008) as Howard French
- Doctors (2012) as Jeff McAllistair
- Doctors (2016) as Phillip Langley
- Emmerdale (2018) as Judge
- Casualty (2019) as William Miller

=== Stage ===
- Royal Shakespeare Company season 1980-1982, playing Lepidus in Julius Caesar, Antonio in Twelfth Night and in Baal.
- The Life and Adventures of Nicholas Nickleby, as Mobbs, Snobb, Lenville and Frank Cheeryble, a Royal Shakespeare Company production that was also recorded on DVD (1981-1982)
- Royal Shakespeare Company season 1984-1985 as Rosencrantz in Hamlet, Montjoy in Henry V, Antonio in The Merchant of Venice, Richmond in Richard III and Pain in Crimes in Hot Countries by Howard Barker.
- Twelfth Night, as Orsino, directed by Kenneth Branagh, Riverside Studios. (1987) Also televised.
- Macbeth, as Banquo, Royal Shakespeare Company, directed by Adrian Noble. (1993)
- Oleanna, as John, at Wolsey Theatre Ipswich. (1995)
- The Woman in Black at the Apollo Theatre London. (2001-2002) He played the lead role of Arthur Kipps.
- Educating Rita (2003) by Willy Russell in which he starred as Frank. Derby Playhouse and other theatres.
- The Tempest, in which he played Prospero, Liverpool Playhouse (2005)
- Alison's House (2009) by Susan Glaspell in which he played Mr Stanhope, Orange Tree Theatre, Richmond.
- The Doll's House (2013) by Ibsen in which he played Dr Rank, Theatre Royal, Bath.
- Bedroom Farce (2009), West Yorkshire Playhouse
- Alison's House (2009), Orange Tree Theatre
- The Promise (2013) by Ben Brown in which he played Herbert Asquith, Orange Tree Theatre, Richmond.
- Comedy of Errors (2010), Open Air Theatre, Regent's Park
- The Conspirators (2011) by Vaclav Havel in which he played Dykl, Orange Tree Theatre, Richmond.
- The Winslow Boy (2012), in which he played Arthur Winslow. Various theatres. He won a Manchester Theatre Award for this role.
- Good Grief (2012), in which he played The Suit, Kings Theatre, Edinburgh and various other theatres.
- The Stepmother (2013) by Githa Sowerby in which he played Eustace Gaydon, Orange Tree Theatre Richmond.
- The Man Who Pays the Piper (2013) by G.B. Stern in which he played Dr Fairley, Orange Tree Theatre, Richmond.
- Dances of Death (2013) by Strindberg in which he played Kurt, Gate Theatre London.
- Storm in a Flower Vase (2013) by Anton Burge in which he played Shav, Arts Theatre, London.
- The Notorious Mrs. Ebbsmith (2014) by Arthur Wing Pinero in which he played Duke of St Olpherts, Jermyn Street Theatre London.
- The Cocktail Party (2015) by T.S. Eliot in which he played Alex, The Print Room, London.
- High Society (2015) Old Vic Theatre, London.
- The Humble Boy (2018) by Charlotte Jones in which he played Jim, Orange Tree Theatre, Richmond.
