= Suzanne Bertish =

English actress

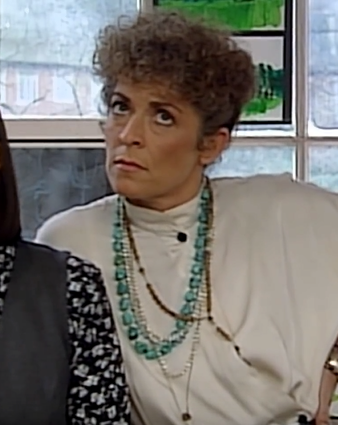
- Bertish in "Back to School Mr. Bean" (1994)
- Born: 7 August 1951 (age 75); Hammersmith, London, England
- Occupation: Actress

Suzanne Bertish (born 7 August 1951) is an English actress.

Educated at Woldingham School, Bertish joined the Royal Shakespeare Company and appeared in many of its productions, including its marathon eight-and-a-half-hour version of Charles Dickens's The Life and Adventures of Nicholas Nickleby, in which she played three roles. She repeated these three roles in the 1982 television version of the complete play. She was later seen in the BBC Television Shakespeare production of Shakespeare's The Comedy of Errors (1983) as Adriana.

In 1984, she appeared as Freida Gottleib, in two series of Shine on Harvey Moon, a refugee from Austria who owns a house with her brother Erich, when the Moons take up tenancy at their lodgings.

She also appeared as a female Arnold Rimmer (Arlene Rimmer), in an episode of Red Dwarf, "Parallel Universe" in 1988.

She has also played small roles in several films, including the Harrison Ford vehicle Hanover Street, and the vampire film The Hunger. She had a recurring role as Eleni in the cable television series Rome (2005–2007). In 2009 she had a role in a production of Breakfast at Tiffany's at the Theatre Royal Haymarket.

== Filmography ==
=== Television ===
Year	Title	Role	Notes
1978	Armchair Thriller	Clare Omney	3 episodes
1979	BBC Play of the Month	Kate Croy	Episode: "The Wings of the Dove"
1979	ITV Playhouse	Lena	Episode: "You're Not Watching Me, Mummy"
1981	Maybury	Julia Charlton	Episode: "Indoor Games"
1981	The Three Sisters	Masha	Television film
1982	The Life and Adventures of Nicholas Nickleby	Fanny Squeers	2 episodes
1982	Shakespeare Lives!		Television series
1983	To the Lighthouse	Lily Briscoe	Television film
1983	The Comedy of Errors	Adriana	Television film
1984	Play for Today	Alice Durkow	Episode: "Rainy Day Women"
1984	Freud	Minna Bernays	Minna Bernays
1984–1985	Shine on Harvey Moon	Frieda Gottlieb	17 episodes
1986	Ladies in Charge	Clara Cane	Episode: "Dangerous Prelude"
1986	Lenny Henry Tonite		Episode: "Pratt Outta Hell"
1986	Girls on Top	RSC Actress 1	Episode: "Mr Yummie Brownie"
1987	Omnibus	Herself	Episode: "Getting to Dylan"
1988	The Modern World: Ten Great Writers	Rebekka West	Episode: "Henrik Ibsen"
1988	Inspector Morse	Cheryl Baines	Episode: "Last Seen Wearing"
1988	Red Dwarf	Arlene Rimmer	Episode: "Parallel Universe"
1989	A Day in Summer	Georgina	Television film
1989	The Bill	Dr. Reece	Episode: "Waste"
1990	Casualty	Caroline Collier	Episode: "Remembrance"
1991	Ruby Takes a Trip...	Herself	Television film
1992	Shakespeare: The Animated Tales	Titania	Episode: "A Midsummer Night's Dream"
1993	Lifestories: Families in Crisis	Dean Stellar	Episode: "No Visible Bruises: The Katie Koestner Story"
1993	15: The Life and Death of Philip Knight	Margaret Harris	Television film
1993	Screen One	Rosa Klein	Episode: "Wall of Silence"
1994	Love Hurts	Mirav Levison	4 episodes
1994	Mr. Bean	Art Teacher	Episode: "Back to School Mr. Bean"
1995	Space Precinct	Regina Baylek	Episode: "Divided We Stand"
1995	Absolutely Fabulous	Gina	Episode: "The End"
1995	The 49th Annual Tony Awards	Herself	Nominee: The Molière Comedies as Lisette/Sganerelle's Wife
1997	Peak Practice	Dr. Brodie	Episode: "Lost Feelings"
1998	Coronation Street	Viv Fay	Episode: #4333
1999	The Scarlet Pimpernel	La Touraine	Episode: "A King's Ransom"
2000	Silent Witness	Eva Horowitz	2 episodes
2000	Ruby	Herself	Episode: #4.4
2003	The Commander	Vivian Newburgh	Television film
2003	The Roman Spring of Mrs. Stone	Julia	Television film
2004	Judas	Rohab	Television film
2004	The Grid	Sarah Camfield	6 episodes
2004	Rosemary & Thyme	Emma Standish	Episode: "The Italian Rapscallion"
2005	Love Soup	Sally	Episode: "Death and Nurses"
2007	Trial & Retribution	Ms Newburgh	Episode: "Mirror Image (Part 1)"
2005–2007	Rome	Eleni	14 episodes
2010	Poirot	Miss Milray	Episode: "Three Act Tradegy"
2011	Secret Diary of a Call Girl	Anna	2 episodes
2016	X Company	Abbess	Episode: "Last Man, Last Round"
2016–2017	Mercy Street	Hospital Matron Brannan	12 episodes
2018	The Looming Tower	Landlady	Episode: "Mistakes Were Made"
2020	Atlantic Crossing	Florence Harriman	8 episodes
2021	Sex Education	Dr. Cutton	3 episodes
2022	Life After Life	Mrs. Woolf	Episode: #1.4
2023	Dead Ringers	Linda	3 episodes
2025	Andor	Aunt Squidna	3 episodes

=== Film ===
Year	Title	Role	Notes
1979	Hanover Street	The French Girl	
1983	The Hunger	Phyllis	
1987	Hearts of Fire	Anne Ashton	
1990	The Monk	Sister Mariana	
1992	Venice/Venice	Carlotta	
1994	Thin Ice	Lotte	
1996	Crimetime	Lady Macbeth	
1997	Bent	Half-Woman - Half-Man	
1999	The 13th Warrior	Hulda	
2004	The Fever	Susan	
2005	The Upside of Anger	Gina	
2005	The Toybox	Madeline Usher	
2009	Holy Money	Charlotte	
2009	Pope Joan	Bishop Arnaldo	
2011	W.E.	Lady Cunard	
2014	River of Fundament	Wake Guest	
2014	The Departure	Blind woman	Short film
2017	Film Stars Don't Die in Liverpool	Fifi Oscard	
2017	The Wife	Dusty Berkowitz	
2018	Royal Shakespeare Company: Troilus and Cressida	Agamemnon	
2018	Tahiti	Francesca	Short film
2019	Mad?	Miriam	
2021	Benediction	Lady Ottoline Morrell	
2023	Magic Mike's Last Dance	Renata	
2023	The Nun II	Madame Laurent	
2024	Hellboy: The Crooked Man	Grammy Oakhum	
TBA	Vindicta	Older Hannah	Post-production

=== Animation ===
Year	Title	Role	Notes
2019–2023	Hey Duggee	Tag's Mum Great Grandmama Tag Mum	6 episodes
