= Edward Petherbridge =

English actor, writer, author, and artist

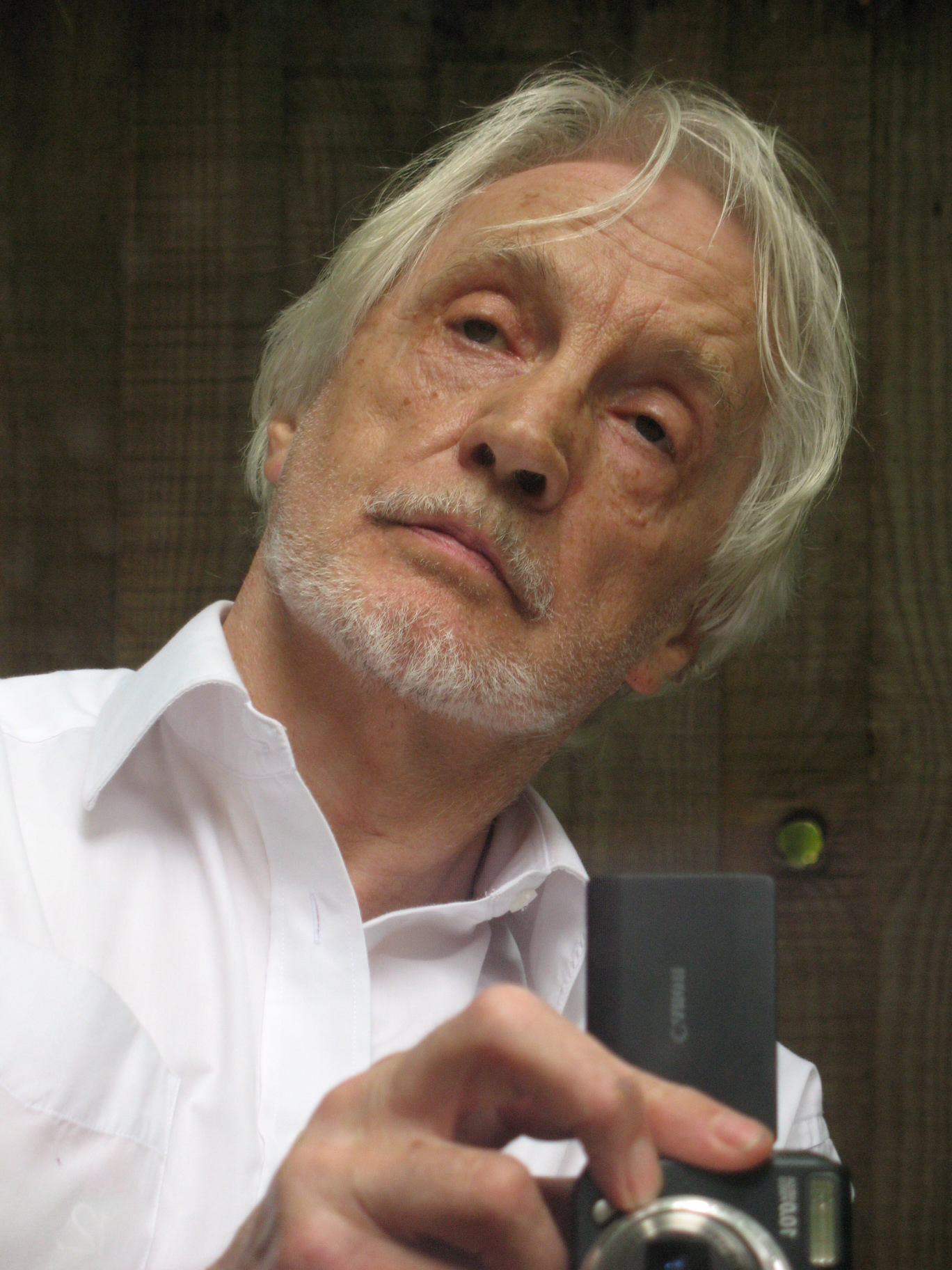
- Petherbridge in 2007
- Born: 3 August 1936 (age 90); Bradford, West Riding of Yorkshire, England
- Occupations: Actor, writer, artist
- Years active: 1956–present
- Spouses: Louise Harris (m. 1957; div. 1980) Emily Richard (m. 1981; died 2024)
- Children: 3

Edward Petherbridge (born 3 August 1936) is an English actor, writer and artist. Among his many roles, he portrayed Lord Peter Wimsey in the 1987 BBC television adaptations of Dorothy L. Sayers' novels, and Guildenstern in Tom Stoppard's Rosencrantz and Guildenstern Are Dead. At the Royal Shakespeare Company in 1980, he was a memorable Newman Noggs in the company's adaptation of Dickens's The Life and Adventures of Nicholas Nickleby.

== Career ==
Petherbridge was born in West Bowling, Bradford, the younger son of William and Hannah Petherbridge. He attended Newby Primary school in West Bowling, Bradford, before later attending Grange Grammar School in Little Horton, Bradford, where his favourite subjects were Art and English Literature. The composer Herbert Howells wrote of Petherbridge's boy soprano rendition, at the Wharfedale Festival, of Schubert's 'Trout': "A fine young musician with a fine gift of word delivery." Petherbridge trained as an actor at Esme Church's Northern Theatre School. At the time of national service in the 1950s, he was a conscientious objector. He made his professional stage debut at the Ludlow Festival in 1956, playing Gaveston in Marlowe's Edward II. His first London appearance was at the Open Air Theatre, Regent's Park in 1962 as Demetrius in A Midsummer Night's Dream.

Petherbridge began his tenure as part of Laurence Olivier's National Theatre Company in the 1960s, walking on in Olivier's Othello and later creating the role of Guildenstern in Tom Stoppard's Rosencrantz and Guildenstern Are Dead. He has been a leading actor in the Royal Shakespeare Company and Royal National Theatre; was a founding member of the Actors' Company in 1972; and with Ian McKellen established the McKellen-Petherbridge Group at the RNT in 1985.

He has been praised for both tragic and comic parts, interpreting roles from Feydeau to Euripides. His major roles on stage include Newman Noggs in Nicholas Nickleby; Charlie Marsden in Strange Interlude; Gaev in The Cherry Orchard; the Cardinal in The Duchess of Malfi; Alceste in The Misanthrope; Frank Ford in The Merry Wives of Windsor; Malvolio in Twelfth Night, King Cymbeline in Cymbeline; Dr Dorn in The Seagull; Sir Anthony Blunt in Single Spies; the title role in 'Cyrano de Bergerac'; Krapp in Samuel Beckett's Krapp's Last Tape; Donner in Tom Stoppard's Artist Descending a Staircase; and Tiresias in Sophocles' Antigone.

Petherbridge has performed in stage musicals, including The Woman in White, Lost in the Stars, The Fantasticks, Coco, and, most recently, a musical version of The Importance of Being Earnest.

On television, he has made appearances in Journey's End, Man at the Top (1972), The Ash Tree (1975), Casting the Runes (1979), Maigret, No Strings, Dead of Night, The Brief, Midsomer Murders (a role he took on after Ian Richardson died a few days before production was to begin), The Land Girls and Doctors. His film roles include Richard St Ives in Mike Newell's An Awfully Big Adventure (1995), Lord Peter Wimsey, Dr. Pritchard in Gulliver's Travels (1996), Foster in A Christmas Carol (1999), Dom Vladimir in The Statement (2003), and Aesculapius in Pope Joan (2009), directed by Sonke Wortmann.

== Awards and honours ==
Petherbridge is a winner of the Olivier and London Theatre Critics' Awards (for his role as Charlie Marsden in Strange Interlude), and has twice been nominated for a Tony Award (for Nicholas Nickleby and Strange Interlude). He has also been a recipient of the Sony Award for Best Actor in a Radio Drama.

In 1989, Petherbridge was awarded an Honorary D.Litt. by the University of Bradford.

== Personal life ==
Petherbridge married the actress Emily Richard who died in 2024. They appeared together several times on stage. Petherbridge and Richard lived in West Hampstead in North London. The couple had two children. He has a son by his first marriage to the New Zealand actress and director Louise Petherbridge (née Harris).

In 2007, Petherbridge suffered two strokes while preparing to star in a production of King Lear. He later fictionalised the experience in the play My Perfect Mind, co-written with Paul Hunter.

His book, Slim Chances and Unscheduled Appearances was published in 2011.

== Publications ==
Petherbridge is the author of Pillar Talk (or Backcloth and Ashes), a one-man show about Saint Simeon Stylites, published in 2005. He has also contributed to The Continuum Companion to Twentieth-Century Theatre.

In 2011, Petherbridge published an autobiographical collection of essays, poems and artwork under the title Slim Chances and Unscheduled Appearances, which includes a foreword by Sir Ian McKellen.
