= Roger Rees =

Welsh actor (1944–2015)

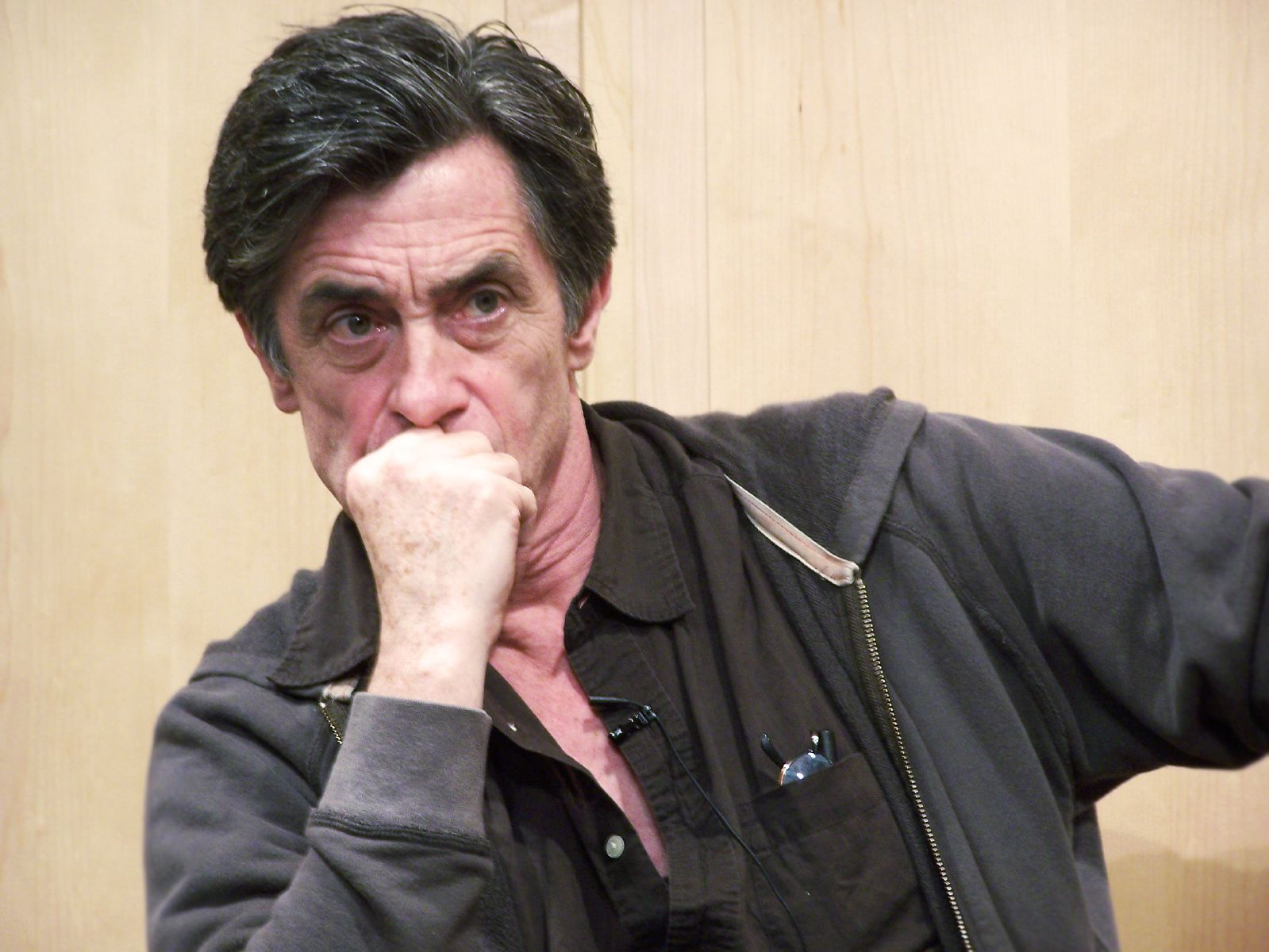
- Rees in 2004
- Born: 5 May 1944; Aberystwyth, Cardiganshire, Wales
- Died: 10 July 2015 (aged 71); New York City, U.S.
- Citizenship: United Kingdom; United States
- Occupations: Actor; director
- Years active: 1967–2015
- Spouse: Rick Elice (m. 2011)

Roger Rees (5 May 1944 – 10 July 2015) was a Welsh-American actor and director. He won an Olivier Award and a Tony Award for his performance as the lead in The Life and Adventures of Nicholas Nickleby. He also received Obie Awards for his role in The End of the Day and as co-director of Peter and the Starcatcher. Rees was posthumously inducted into the American Theater Hall of Fame in November 2015.

On television, he played Robin Colcord in Cheers and Lord John Marbury in The West Wing. He also appeared as the Sheriff of Rottingham in Mel Brooks' Robin Hood: Men in Tights.

== Early life ==
Rees was born in Aberystwyth, Cardiganshire, Wales, the son of Doris Louise (née Smith), a shop clerk, and William John Rees, a police officer. He and his parents moved to Balham, London, where he grew up. He studied art at the Camberwell College of Arts and the Slade School of Fine Art, turning to acting when he was painting backdrops at the Wimbledon Theatre and was asked to fill a part in a play.

== Career ==
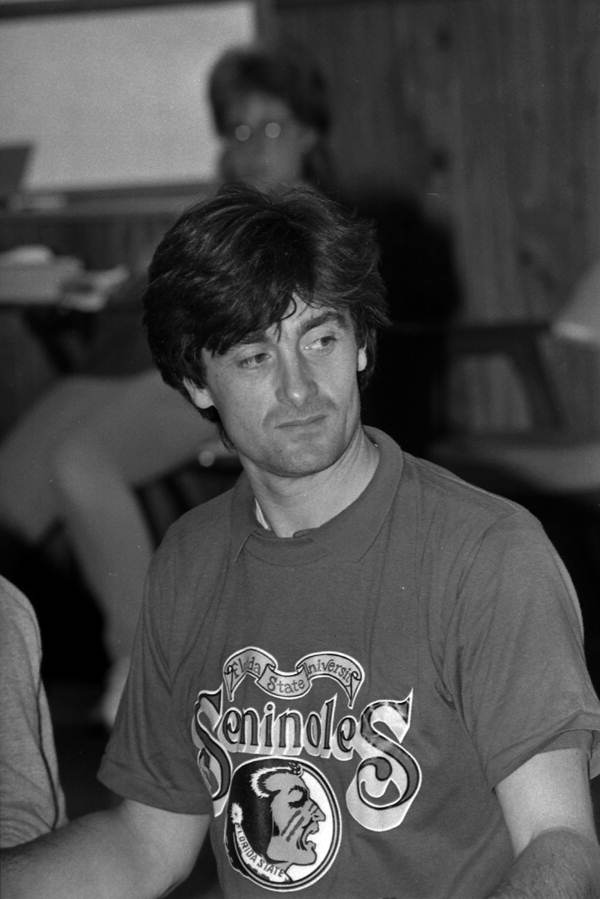
Rees at Florida State University in 1985

Rees continued his career with the Royal Shakespeare Company. He played Malcolm in the acclaimed Trevor Nunn 1976 stage and 1978 television production of Macbeth. Rees created the title role in the original production of The Life and Adventures of Nicholas Nickleby, David Edgar's stage adaptation of the Charles Dickens novel, winning a Laurence Olivier Award for Actor of the Year in a New Play in 1980 and a Tony Award for Best Actor in a Play in 1982. A recorded version of the play also earned him an Emmy nomination in 1983. He also starred in the original production of The Real Thing by Tom Stoppard at the Strand Theatre in London in 1982.

Rees began to work in television during the 1980s, appearing opposite Laurence Olivier in The Ebony Tower (1984). That same year, Rees portrayed Fred Hollywell in A Christmas Carol, which he also narrated, starring George C. Scott as Scrooge. In 1986, he played William Tyndale in God's Outlaw. From 1988 to 1991 he starred in the British sitcom Singles, with co-star Judy Loe. From 1989 to 1993, he appeared intermittently on the long-running American television series Cheers as the English business tycoon Robin Colcord, a love interest for Rebecca Howe (Kirstie Alley). He played British Ambassador Lord John Marbury in several episodes of The West Wing from 2000 to 2005. His later television appearances also include My So-Called Life as substitute teacher Mr. Racine, and James MacPherson on Warehouse 13. His film career began in the 1980s. Rees played the Sheriff of Rottingham in the Mel Brooks movie Robin Hood: Men in Tights (1993). Rees' later film appearances include Frida (2002), The Prestige (2006), and The Pink Panther (2006).

Continuing his work in the theatre through the 1990s, both as an actor and a director, Rees was awarded an Obie Award for his 1992 performance in the Off-Broadway play The End of the Day. In 1995, he was nominated for a Tony Award for Best Actor in a Play for his role in Indiscretions. He recorded many audiobooks, including Memnoch the Devil by Anne Rice.

From November 2004 to October 2007, Rees was artistic director of the Williamstown Theatre Festival, only the fourth person to hold the post in its half-century history. He replaced Nathan Lane in the role of Gomez Addams in the Broadway musical adaptation of The Addams Family, on 22 March 2011 and remained until the end of the run on 31 December 2011.

In 2012, Rees took his one-man Shakespeare show, What You Will, to London's West End, playing a three-week engagement at the Apollo Theatre.

In 2013, Rees directed Crispin Whitell's play The Primrose Path at the Guthrie Theater in Minneapolis.

In 2014, Rees directed Dog and Pony, a musical written by Rick Elice and Michael Patrick Walker, which had its world premiere at the Old Globe Theatre in San Diego.

His last role was as Anton Schell in the musical version of The Visit, opposite Chita Rivera, which opened on Broadway on 23 April 2015 and closed on 14 June 2015. Rees left the production in May 2015 owing to his illness.

Rees was to have directed a new musical called Magnificent Climb, written by Elice and Will Van Dyke, in the fall of 2016 at MCC Theater in New York City. He was also scheduled to perform his one-man Shakespeare show What You Will in New York in the autumn of 2015 and had hoped to return to the Royal Shakespeare Company for a stint in Don Quixote in 2016. Rees was inducted into the exclusive entertainment fraternity, the Grand Order of Water Rats, as a full member.

== Personal life ==
Rees lived in the United States for more than 25 years and became a naturalized American citizen in 1989. He converted to Judaism in the 1980s. Rees married his partner of 33 years, playwright Rick Elice, in 2011, shortly after same-sex marriage in New York was legalised. Rees and Elice also collaborated professionally, including as co-playwrights of the comedic thriller Double Double. Elice co-wrote (with Marshall Brickman) the libretto for The Addams Family musical, the cast of which Rees joined on 22 March 2011. In 2012, Elice and Rees received Tony Award nominations for Elice's stage adaptation and Rees' co-direction (with Alex Timbers), respectively, of Peter and the Starcatcher. In October 2017, Elice wrote a memoir of his life with Rees, entitled Finding Roger: An Improbably Theatrical Love Story.

=== Illness and death ===
After a diagnosis of brain cancer in October 2014, Rees focused his energy on his commitment to playing opposite Chita Rivera on Broadway in The Visit, the final musical written by John Kander and Fred Ebb. While undergoing two brain surgeries, two courses of radiation and ongoing chemotherapy, Rees managed to rehearse, preview and open in The Visit on 23 April 2015. By the middle of May, it had become too difficult for him to speak, and he left the show. Rees died at age 71 at his home in New York City on 10 July 2015. On 15 July 2015, the marquee lights at all the theatres on Broadway were dimmed in his honour. His ashes were scattered in the Atlantic Ocean. Two months later, there was a memorial service for him at Broadway's New Amsterdam Theatre. On 16 November 2015, Rees was inducted, posthumously, into the Broadway Theatre Hall of Fame.

== Acting credits ==
=== Film ===
Year	Title	Role	Notes
1983	Star 80	Aram Nicholas	
1984	A Christmas Carol	Fred - Scrooge's nephew	
1986	God's Outlaw: The Story of William Tyndale	William Tyndale	
1991	If Looks Could Kill – Teen Agent	Augustus Steranko	
1992	Stop! Or My Mom Will Shoot	J. Parnell	
1993	Robin Hood: Men in Tights	Sheriff of Rottingham	
1996	The Substance of Fire	Max	
1996	Sudden Manhattan	Murphy	
1997	Trouble on the Corner	Mr. McMurtry	
1998	Next Stop Wonderland	Ray Thornback	
1999	A Midsummer Night's Dream	Peter Quince	
1999	The Bumblebee Flies Anyway	Dr. Croft	
2000	BlackMale	Bill Fontaine	
2001	3 A.M.	Priest	
2002	Return 2 Never Land	Edward (voice)	
2002	The Scorpion King	King Pheron	
2002	Frida	Guillermo Kahlo	
2002	The Emperor's Club	Mr. Castle	
2004	The Tulse Luper Suitcases, Part 2: Vaux to the Sea	Tulse Luper	
2004	The Tulse Luper Suitcases, Part 3: From Sark to the Finish	Tulse Luper	
2004	Going Under	Peter	
2004	Crazy Like a Fox	Nat Banks	
2005	Game 6	Jack Haskins	
2005	A Life in Suitcases	Tulse Luper	
2005	The New World	Virginia Company Representative	Uncredited
2006	The Pink Panther	Raymond Larocque	
2006	East Broadway	Andrew Barrington Sr.	
2006	The Treatment	Leighton Proctor	
2006	Garfield: A Tail of Two Kitties	Mr. Hobbs	
2006	The Prestige	Owens	
2007	The Invasion	Yorish	
2008	The Narrows	Professor Reyerson	
2010	Happy Tears	Antiques Dealer	
2011	Almost Perfect	Kai Lee	
2011	Portraits in Dramatic Time	Himself	
2014	Affluenza	Mr. Carson	
2015	Survivor	Dr. Emil Balan	Final film role

=== Television ===
Year	Title	Role	Notes
1975	The Place of Peace	Willy	television movie
1982	The Life and Adventures of Nicholas Nickleby	Nicholas Nickleby	televised RSC production
1984	Tales of the Unexpected	James Howgill	episode "The Reconciliation"
1984	A Christmas Carol	Fred Holywell / narrator	television movie
1988–89	Singles	Malcolm	14 episodes
1989–93	Cheers	Robin Colcord	17 episodes
1990	The Young Riders	Tyler Dewitt	episode "Lady for a Night"
1991–93	The Legend of Prince Valiant	Rathburn / Lord Theobine [voices]	3 episodes
1992	Charles and Diana: Unhappily Ever After	Prince Charles	television movie
1992	P.J. Sparkles	Betty [voice]	television movie
1993	The Tower	Mr. Littlehill	television movie
1994	Mighty Max	Additional voice [voice]	episode "Around the World in Eighty Arms"
1994–95	M.A.N.T.I.S.	Dr. John Stonebrake	main cast, 22 episodes
1994	My So-Called Life	Vic Racine	episode "The Substitute"
1995	The Possession of Michael D.	Robin Banks (hypnotist)	television movie
1995	Gargoyles	Prince Malcolm [voice]	episodes "Long Way to Morning" and "Vows"
1995	Phantom 2040	Ikon [voice]	episode "The Sins of the Fathers: Part One"
1996	Titanic	J. Bruce Ismay	television miniseries
1997	Boston Common	President Harrison Cross	8 episodes
1997	Liberty! The American Revolution	Thomas Paine	5 episodes
1997	Extreme Ghostbusters	The Piper (voice)	episode "The Pied Piper of Manhattan"
1997	Damian Cromwell's Postcards from America	Damian Cromwell	
1999	Double Platinum	Marc Reckler	television movie
2000	The Crossing	Hugh Mercer	television movie
2000–05	The West Wing	Lord John Marbury	5 episodes, recurring cast
2001	Oz	Jack Eldridge	episode "Medium Rare"
2002	The Education of Max Bickford	Dan Franklin	episode "The Bad Girl"
2003	Law & Order	Headmaster Wyatt Scofield	episode "Kid Pro Quo"
2005–06	Related	Bob's Dad	episodes "Have Yourself a Sorelli Little Christmas" and "Sisters are Forever"
2007	Grey's Anatomy	Dr. Colin Marlow	3 episodes
2009	Law & Order: Criminal Intent	Duke DeGuerin	episode "Alpha Dog"
2009–13	Warehouse 13	James MacPherson	7 episodes
2010	The Cleveland Show	(voice)	episode "Brown History Month"
2010	The Good Wife	Dr. Todd Grossman	episode "Nine Hours"
2012	Submissions Only	Roger Rees	episode "Y'all Were Great!"
2012–14	Elementary	Alistair Moore	episodes "Flight Risk" and "No Lack of Void"
2013	The Middle	Mr. Glover	episode "The Smile"
2013–14	It Could Be Worse	Roger Goldstein	episodes "Stuck with Me" and "Uncharted Territory"
2014	Forever	Priest	episode "Diamonds Are Forever"
2015	American Experience – The Pilgrims	Governor Bradford	episode "The Pilgrims"
2016	The Mayflower Pilgrims: Behind the Myth.	Governor Bradford	posthumous release

=== Theatre ===
- The Comedy of Errors (as Antipholus of Syracuse), Stratford-on-Avon and London, 1976
- Three Sisters (as Tusenbach) Stratford-upon-Avon London and tour, 1979
- "The Suicide" by Nikolai Erdman (as Semyon Semyonovich). Royal Shakespeare Company. 1979.
- Cymbeline (as Posthumus), Royal Shakespeare Company, Stratford-on-Avon 1979
- Cymbeline (as Posthumus), Royal National Theatre, 1980
- The Life and Adventures of Nicholas Nickleby (as Nicholas Nickleby), Royal Shakespeare Company

- Aldwych Theatre, London, June 1980 – June 1981
- Plymouth Theatre, Broadway, September 1981 – March 1982

- The Real Thing (as Henry), London, 1982
- Hapgood by Tom Stoppard as Kerner, London March 1988
- Hamlet as Hamlet, Royal Shakespeare Company, Stratford upon Avon, 1984
- The End of the Day (as Graydon Massey), Playwrights Horizons, off-Broadway, 1992
- Indiscretions (as George), Ethel Barrymore Theatre, Broadway, 1995
- A Man of No Importance (as Alfie Byrne), Mitzi E. Newhouse Theater, off-Broadway, 2002
- Waiting for Godot (as Vladimir, replacing Patrick Stewart), Haymarket Theatre, London, 2010
- Waiting for Godot (as Vladimir), His Majesty's Theatre, Perth, 2010
- Waiting for Godot (as Vladimir), Her Majesty's Theatre, Adelaide, 2010
- Waiting for Godot (as Vladimir), Comedy Theatre, Melbourne, 2010
- The Addams Family (as Gomez [Replaced Nathan Lane]), Broadway, 2011
- Peter and the Starcatcher (co-director with Alex Timbers), Broadway, 2012 (and then it moved to an Off-Broadway theatre in 2013)
- What You Will (Actor, Writer, Director) Apollo Theater, London 2012
- Herringbone (Director) 2012
- The Primrose Path (Director), Guthrie Theater, 2013
- The Winslow Boy (as Arthur Winslow), American Airlines Theatre, Broadway, 2013
- Dog and Pony (Director) Old Globe Theater 2014
- The Visit (musical version; as Anton Schell), Broadway, 2015
