= Jane Downs =

English actress (1935–2015)

- Born: Jane Margaret Downs; 22 January 1935; Bromley, Kent, England
- Died: 20 May 2015 (aged 80); London, England
- Spouses: Gerald Harper (m. 1957; div. 1975) Terence Alexander (m. 1976; died 2009)

Jane Margaret Downs (22 January 1935 – 20 May 2015) was an English actress.

== Early life ==
Downs was born in Bromley, Kent, England.

== Career ==
She started her career in the theatre, and later appeared on radio and in film, playing Kenneth More's wife in A Night to Remember (1958). Her first husband, Gerald Harper, appeared in the same film.

== Personal life and death ==
During the 1970s, she appeared on stage and television alongside Terence Alexander, whom she married in 1976, following her divorce from Harper.

Downs died in London in May 2015 at the age of 80.

== Filmography ==
Film and television
Year	Title	Role	Notes
1958	A Night to Remember	Iowa Sylvania Zillah "Sylvia" Hawley-Wilson (Mrs. Sylvia Lightoller)	
1960	Emergency Ward 10	Audrey Blake / Audrey Dawson	
1961	Sword of Freedom	Violetta	Episode: "Violetta"
1965	Darling	Julie	
1982	The Life and Adventures of Nicholas Nickleby	Mrs. Nickleby	TV film of RSC production
1990	Jeeves and Wooster	Lady Delia Glossop	3 episodes
1991	Bergerac	Petra Crowe-Smith	Episode: "All For Love"
1993	Heartbeat	Edna Plummer	Episode: "Missing"
1993	Batman: Mask of the Phantasm	Additional Voices	Voice
1996	Pie in the Sky	Traffic Reporter	
2003	Midsomer Murders	Dixie Goff	Episode: "A Talent for Life"

Theatre
Year	Production	Role	Notes
1962	Boeing-Boeing	Judith	Apollo Theatre in London, with Patrick Cargill, David Tomlinson, Andree Melly, Carole Shelley and Carmel McSharry
1957	The Iron Duchess	Mary Garvald	Fortune Theatre
1982	Way Upstream	Mrs Hatfield	Lyttelton Theatre
