= Hugh Pollard (actor) =

British actor

- Born: 1975 (age 49–50); St. Pancras, London, United Kingdom
- Occupation: Actor
- Spouse: Nicola Skyes (m. 1999)

Hugh Pollard (born 1975) is a former British child actor, most recognised for his role as Simon in the Children's BBC show Simon and the Witch (1987–88). He is also known for playing the role of Hansel, in the movie Hansel and Gretel (1987).

Pollard attended the Christ Church C of E School in Finchley, North London, before leaving in 1992. He graduated from the University of Kent, with a degree in radio, film and television. Following his role in Simon and the Witch, Hugh won the role as Hansel in the film Hansel and Gretel (1987). His role in the film saw him team up with Simon and the Witch co-star Nicola Stapleton, who played Gretel.

Pollard gave up his acting career, working briefly as a broadcaster for the BBC before gaining a job as a video tape operator. This job has taken him across the world, and involves him creating slow motion replays in sporting events, that include both the Olympics and Wimbledon. He married Nicola Skyes in 1999, and has lived on the shore off Grafham Water, Cambridgeshire since August 2001.
