= Nicholas Nickleby =

1838–1839 novel by Charles Dickens

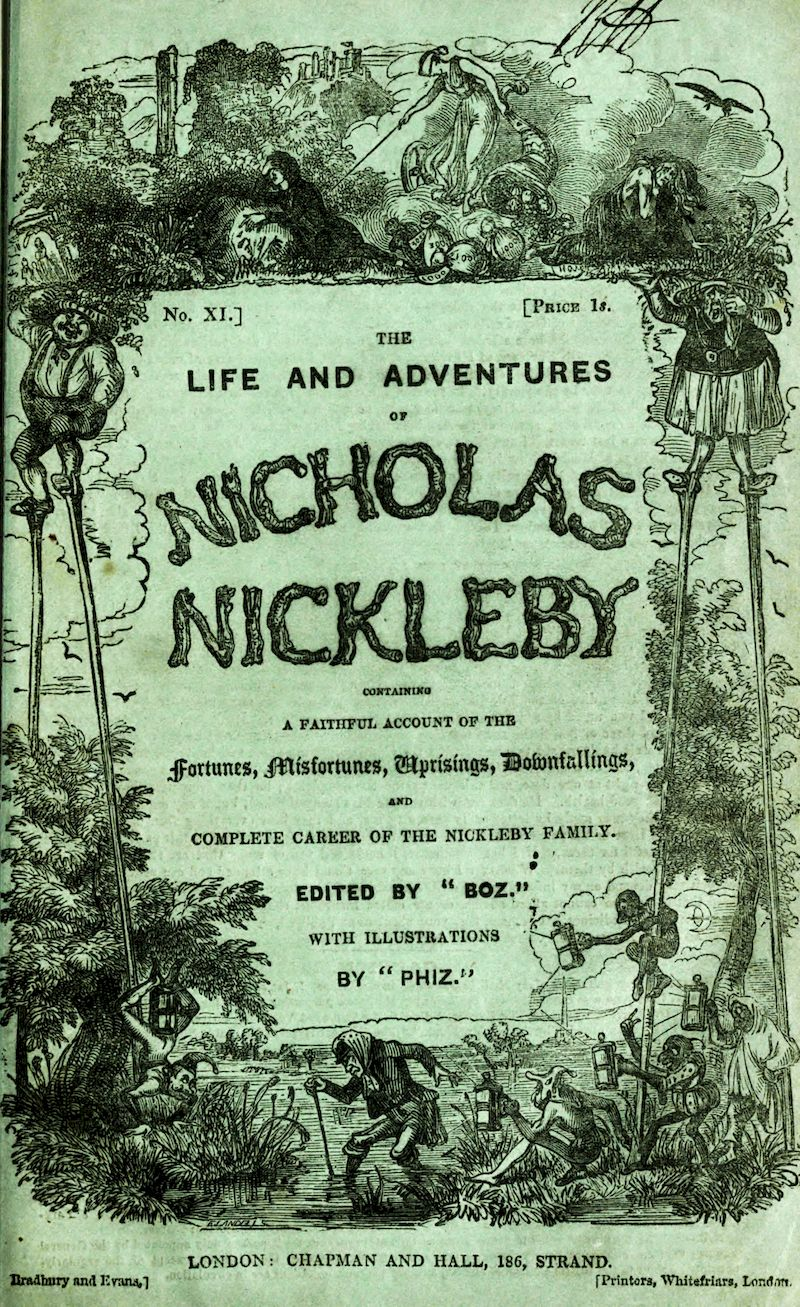
- Cover of serial, No. XI, January 1839
- Author: Charles Dickens
- Original title: The Life and Adventures of Nicholas Nickleby
- Illustrator: Hablot Knight Browne (Phiz)
- Language: English
- Genre: Novel
- Published: Serialised March 1838 -October 1839; book format 1839
- Publisher: Chapman & Hall
- Publication place: England
- Media type: Print
- Pages: 952 (first edition)
- OCLC: 231037034
- Preceded by: Oliver Twist
- Followed by: The Old Curiosity Shop

Nicholas Nickleby, or The Life and Adventures of Nicholas Nickleby, is the third novel by English author Charles Dickens, originally published as a serial from 1838 to 1839. The character of Nickleby is a young man who must support his mother and sister after his father dies.

== Background ==
The Life and Adventures of Nicholas Nickleby, Containing a Faithful Account of the Fortunes, Misfortunes, Uprisings, Downfallings, and Complete Career of the Nickleby Family saw Dickens return to his favourite publishers and to the format that proved so successful with The Pickwick Papers. The story first appeared in monthly parts, after which it was issued in one volume. Dickens began writing Nickleby while still working on Oliver Twist.

== Plot ==
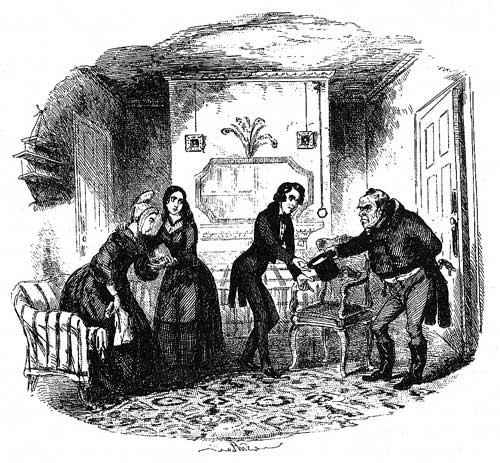
Mr Ralph Nickleby's first visit to his poor relations.

Following the death of his father, Nicholas Nickleby, his mother, and sister Kate are left destitute and seek help from their wealthy, cold-hearted uncle Ralph Nickleby in London. Ralph despises Nicholas and secures him a teaching position at Dotheboys Hall, a Yorkshire boarding school run by the cruel Wackford Squeers, who abuses and starves his pupils. Nicholas befriends Smike, a mistreated servant boy, but flees after violently defending Smike from Squeers. The pair escape to London, aided by the sympathetic John Browdie.

Meanwhile, Ralph forces Kate and her mother into squalid lodgings and manipulates Kate into working for a milliner, where she endures humiliation. Ralph further exploits Kate by parading her before his dissolute associates, including Sir Mulberry Hawk, who harasses her. When Kate resists, Ralph threatens to withdraw support.

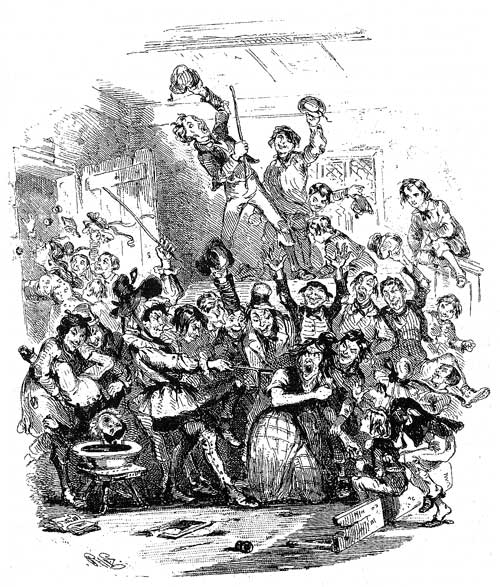
The breaking up at Dotheboys Hall.

In London, Nicholas, aided by Ralph’s clerk Newman Noggs, confronts his uncle over false accusations from Squeers’ daughter Fanny. Ralph disowns them, prompting Nicholas to leave with Smike. They join Vincent Crummles’ theatrical troupe, achieving temporary success. Meanwhile, Kate, fired after a workplace rivalry, becomes a companion to socialite Mrs. Wittiterly but faces further harassment from Hawk. Noggs alerts Nicholas, who returns to protect Kate.

Nicholas thwarts Hawk’s advances, leading to a carriage accident that injures Hawk. Ralph loses money owed by Verisopht, intensifying his vendetta. Nicholas secures employment with the benevolent Cheeryble brothers, who house the family. Smike, now ill, is targeted by Squeers and Ralph, who conspire to kidnap him, but Smike is rescued by Browdie.

Nicholas falls for Madeline Bray, a penniless artist unknowingly ensnared in Ralph’s scheme. Ralph and miser Arthur Gride plot to force Madeline into marrying Gride to claim her inheritance. Nicholas intervenes, and Madeline’s father dies repentant, nullifying the marriage.

Smike, revealed to be Ralph’s estranged son through the confession of Ralph’s former clerk Brooker, succumbs to tuberculosis. Grief-stricken and confronted by his role in Smike’s suffering, Ralph commits suicide. Squeers is arrested and transported to Australia, while Dotheboys Hall is abandoned.

The Nicklebys, now prosperous, return to Devonshire. Nicholas marries Madeline; Kate weds the Cheerybles’ nephew Frank. The family mourns Smike but finds contentment, supported by allies like Noggs and Miss La Creevy. Ralph’s fortune is forfeited, and justice prevails for the exploited.

== Characters ==
=== The Nickleby family ===
Nicholas Nickleby
The hero of the novel. His father has died and left Nicholas and his family penniless. Nicholas is honest and steadfast, but his youth and inexperience of the world can lead him to be violent, naïve, and emotional. In his preface to the novel, Dickens writes, "There is only one other point, on which I would desire to offer a remark. If Nicholas be not always found to be blameless or agreeable, he is not always intended to appear so. He is a young man of an impetuous temper and of little or no experience; and I saw no reason why such a hero should be lifted out of nature." He devotes himself primarily to his friends and family and fiercely defies those who wrong the ones he loves.
Ralph Nickleby
The book's principal antagonist, Nicholas's uncle. He seems to care about nothing but money and takes an immediate dislike to the idealistic Nicholas; however, he does harbour something of a soft spot for Kate. Ralph's anger at Nicholas's beating of Wackford Squeers leads to a serious rift with his nephew, and after Nicholas interferes with his machinations several more times, Ralph schemes to deliberately hurt and humiliate Nicholas; but the only man Ralph ends up destroying is himself. When it is revealed that Smike was his son, and that the boy died hating him, he takes his own life. He dies without a will, and his family refuses to take his property, so his hard-earned fortune is taken by the Crown and lost.

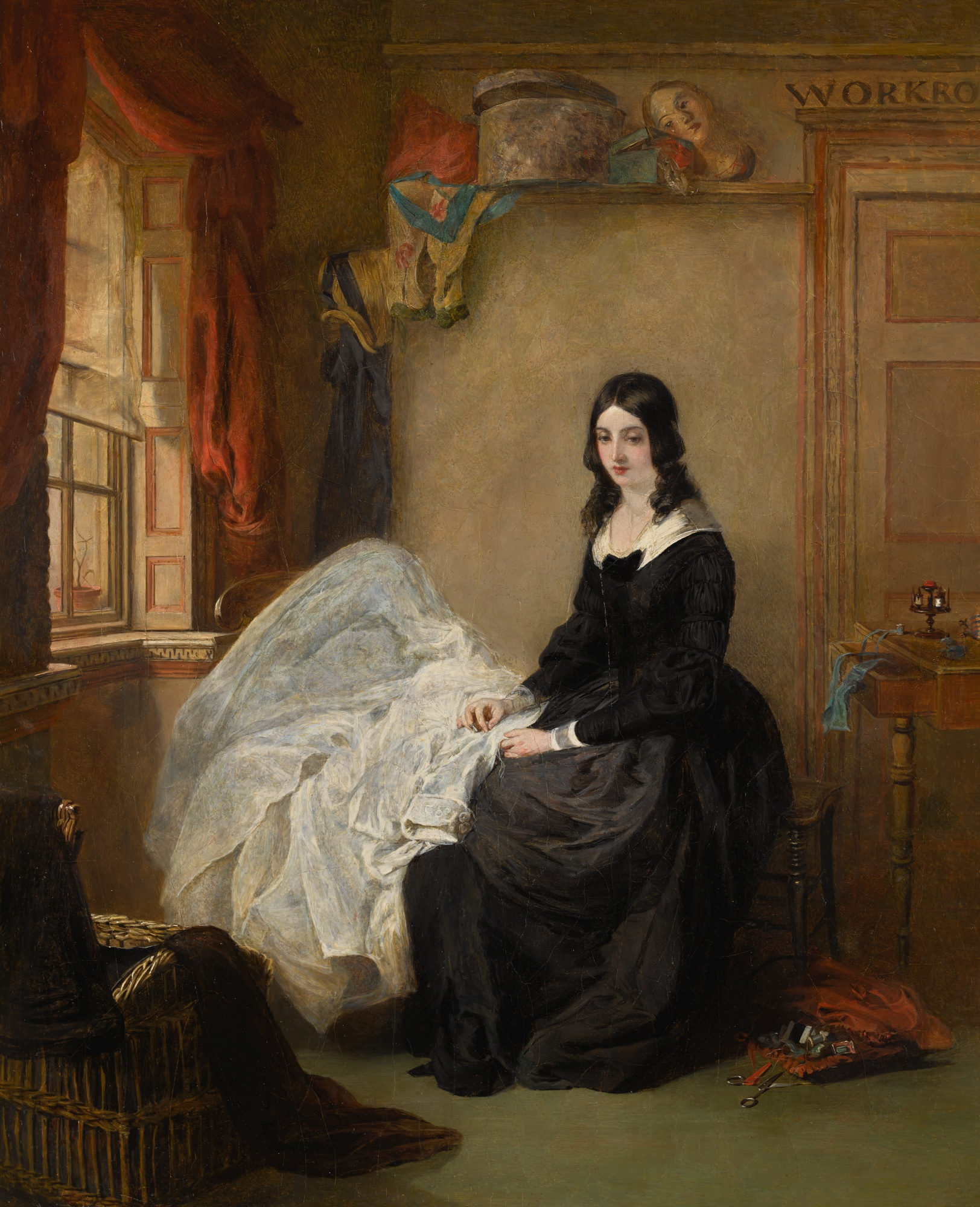
Kate Nickleby at Madame Mantalini's by William Powell Frith, 1842. The painting was commissioned from Frith by Dickens.

Catherine "Kate" Nickleby
Nicholas's younger sister. Kate is a fairly passive character, typical of Dickensian women, but she shares some of her brother's fortitude and strong will. She does not blanch at hard labour to earn her keep, and defends herself against the lecherous Sir Mulberry Hawk. She finds well-deserved happiness with Frank Cheeryble.
Mrs. Catherine Nickleby
Nicholas and Kate's mother, who provides much of the novel's comic relief. The muddleheaded Mrs. Nickleby often does not see the true evil her children encounter until it is directly pointed out to her, and her obtuseness occasionally worsens her children's predicaments. She is stubborn, prone to long digressions on irrelevant or unimportant topics and unrealistic fantasies, and displays an often vague grasp of what is going on around her.

=== Associates of Ralph Nickleby ===
Newman Noggs
Ralph's clerk, who becomes Nicholas's devoted friend. He was once a gentleman but lost his money and went bankrupt. He is an alcoholic, and his general good nature and insight into human nature is hidden under a veneer of irrational tics and erratic behaviour.
Sir Mulberry Hawk
A lecherous nobleman who has taken Lord Verisopht under his wing. One of the most truly evil characters in the novel, he forces himself upon Kate and pursues her solely to humiliate her after she rejects him. He is beaten by Nicholas, and swears revenge, but is prevented in this by Lord Verisopht. He kills Verisopht in a duel and must flee to France, putting a stop to his plans of revenge. He lives abroad in luxury until he runs out of money, and eventually returns to England and dies in debtors' prison.
Lord Frederick Verisopht
Hawk's friend and dupe, a rich young nobleman. He owes both Ralph and Sir Mulberry vast sums of money. He becomes infatuated with Kate and is manipulated by Hawk into finding her whereabouts. After Nicholas confronts them in a coffeehouse, Lord Frederick realises the shame of his behaviour and threatens Hawk if he attempts retaliation for the injuries Nicholas caused him. This quarrel eventually leads to a physical fight, which results in a duel in which Lord Frederick is killed.
Mr Pluck and Mr Pyke
Hangers-on to Hawk and Verisopht. They are never seen apart and are quite indistinguishable from one another. Pluck and Pyke are intelligent, sly and dapper, perfect tools to do Hawk's dirty work for him.
Arthur Gride
An elderly associate of Ralph. A miser, he lives in a large, empty house extremely frugally, despite his vast wealth. He gains possession of the will of Madeline's grandfather, and attempts to cheat her out of her fortune by marrying her. He is cowardly, servile and greedy, with no redeeming characteristics whatsoever (although he does know something about romantic feelings). He alone among Ralph's conspirators escapes legal punishment, but he is eventually murdered by burglars, who have heard rumours of his vast wealth.
Peg Sliderskew
Gride's elderly housekeeper. Illiterate, very deaf, and becoming senile, she ends up playing a large part in the denouement when she steals a number of papers from Gride, including Madeline's grandfather's will.
Brooker
An old beggar. A mysterious figure who appears several times during the novel. We eventually find out that he was formerly Ralph's clerk. He was responsible for bringing Ralph's son (Smike) to Dotheboys Hall. An ex-convict, he returns to extort money from Ralph with the information that his son is alive. When that fails, he goes to Noggs, and eventually brings his story to light. In the epilogue, it is mentioned that he dies repentant of his crimes.

=== Yorkshire ===
Smike
A poor drudge living in Squeers's "care". About 18 years old, Smike is a pathetic figure, perpetually ill and dim-witted, who has been in Squeers's care since he was very young. Nicholas gives him the courage to run away, but when that fails Nicholas saves him and the two become travelling companions and close friends. He falls in love with Kate, but his heart is broken when she falls in love with Frank Cheeryble. After Smike dies peacefully of "a dread disease" (tuberculosis), it is revealed that he is Ralph Nickleby's son, and thus first cousin to Nicholas and to Kate.
Wackford Squeers
A cruel, one-eyed, Yorkshire schoolmaster. He runs Dotheboys Hall, a boarding school for unwanted children. He mistreats the boys horribly, starving them and beating them regularly. When Nicholas attempts to prevent his flogging Smike, fisticuffs ensue, and Nicholas severely beats him. He travels to London after he recovers, and partakes in more bad business, fulfilling his grudge against Nicholas by becoming a close partner in Ralph's schemes to fake Smike's parentage and later to obfuscate the will that would make Madeline Bray an heiress. He is arrested during the last of these tasks and sentenced to be transported to Australia.

Dickens insisted that Squeers was based not on an individual Yorkshire schoolmaster but was a composite of several he had met while visiting the county to investigate such establishments for himself, with the "object [of] calling public attention to the system." However literary critic and author Cumberland Clark (1862–1941) notes that the denial was prompted by fear of libel and that the inspiration for the character was in fact William Shaw, of William Shaw's Academy, Bowes. Clark notes a court case brought against Shaw by the parents of a boy blinded through neglect while at the school, in which the description of the premises matches closely that in the novel. A surviving example of Shaw's business card is compared to that offered by Squeers in the novel and the wording is shown to match that used by Dickens. Shaw's descendant Ted Shaw is president of the Dickens Fellowship and claims that Dickens had "sensationalised and exaggerated the facts".
Mrs Squeers
is even more cruel and less affectionate than her husband to the boys in their care. She dislikes Nicholas on sight and attempts to make his life at Dotheboys Hall as difficult as possible.
Fanny Squeers
The Squeers' daughter. She is 23, unattractive, ill-tempered, and eager to find a husband. She falls in love with Nicholas until he bluntly rebuffs her affections, which causes her to antagonise him passionately and openly. Tilda Price is her best friend but the relationship is strained by Fanny's pride and spitefulness. She is haughty, self-important and is deluded about her beauty and station.
Young Wackford Squeers
The Squeers' loutish son. His parents dote on him and he is very fat as a result of their spoiling him. He is preoccupied with filling his belly as often as he can and bullying his father's boys, to his father's great pride. When the boys revolt, they dip his head several times in a bowl of the disgusting brimstone (sulphur) and treacle "remedy" that they are regularly force-fed as a punishment.
John Browdie
A bluff Yorkshire corn merchant, with a loud, boisterous sense of humour. At the start of the novel he is engaged to Tilda Price and marries her about halfway through the book. Although he and Nicholas get off on the wrong foot, they become good friends when John helps Nicholas escape from Yorkshire. He later comes to London on his honeymoon and rescues Smike from Squeers' captivity, proving himself a resourceful and intelligent ally.
Matilda "Tilda" Price (Browdie)
Fanny's best friend and Browdie's fiancée. A pretty miller's daughter of 18, Tilda puts up with Fanny's pettiness because of their childhood friendship but later breaks off their friendship after she realises the extent of Fanny's selfishness. She is rather coquettish but settles down happily with John Browdie.
Phib (Phoebe)
The Squeers' housemaid, who is forced to endure Mrs Squeers' foul temper and Fanny's scorn in order to keep her job. She flatters Fanny to keep her in good humour. She is described as hungry.

=== Around London ===
Miss La Creevy
The Nicklebys' landlady. A small, kindly (if somewhat ridiculous) woman in her fifties, she is a miniature-portrait painter. She is the first friend the Nicklebys make in London, and one of the truest. She is rewarded for her good-heartedness when she falls in love with Tim Linkinwater and they later marry. Her character was said to have been inspired by the artist Rose Emma Drummond.
Hannah
Miss La Creevy's faithful but noticeably stupid maid.
Mr Snawley
An oil merchant who puts his two stepsons into Squeers's "care". He pretends to be Smike's father to help Squeers get back at Nicholas, but, when pursued by the Cheerybles, cracks under the pressure and eventually confesses everything.
Mr and Madame Mantalini
Milliners, Kate's employers. Alfred Muntle (he changed his name to Mantalini for business purposes) is a handsome man with a large bushy black mustache who lives off his wife's business. He is not above stealing from his wife and dramatically threatens to kill himself whenever he does not get his way. Madame Mantalini is much older than her husband and equally prone to dramatics. She eventually gets wise and divorces him, but not until he has ruined her with extravagant spending and she is forced to sell the business to Miss Knag. Mantalini is seen again at the end of the book living in much reduced circumstances, romantically tied to a washerwoman, but still up to his old tricks.
Miss Knag
Mrs Mantalini's right-hand woman and the chief assistant in the showroom. Miss Knag is well into middle age but is under the impression that she is exceptionally beautiful. When Kate begins her employment with the Mantalinis, Miss Knag is quite kind to her because the younger woman is clumsy, making Miss Knag look more accomplished by comparison. But when she is insulted by a disgruntled customer who prefers to be served by Kate, she blames Kate and ostracizes her. She takes over the business when the Mantalinis go bankrupt, immediately firing Kate. A spinster, she lives with her brother Mortimer, a failed novelist.
The Kenwigs family
Newman Noggs's neighbours. Mr Kenwigs and his wife Susan are dependent on the latter's wealthy uncle Mr Lillyvick, and everything they do is designed to please him so he will not write their children (including their baby, named Lillyvick) out of his will. Their daughter Morleena is an awkward child of seven. The family and their acquaintances are described by Dickens as "exceptionally common."
Mr Lillyvick
Mrs Kenwigs's uncle. He is a collector of the water rate, a position which gives him great importance among his poor relatives. They bend over backwards to please him, and he is completely used to getting his way. He falls in love with Miss Petowker and marries her, to the Kenwigs' great distress. When she elopes with another man, he comes back to his family a sadder but wiser man.
Henrietta Petowker
Of the Theatre Royal, Drury Lane. A minor actress with a prestigious company and a major star with the significantly less prestigious Crummles troupe. Mrs Crummles' protégée. She marries Mr Lillyvick after meeting him at the Kenwigs' wedding anniversary party, but leaves him for another man within a few months.
Henry and Julia Wittiterly
A wealthy, social-climbing couple who employ Kate as a companion to Mrs Wittiterly. Mrs Wittiterly is a hypochondriac and puts on a show of her frailty and poor health, but she has a fierce temper when she does not get her way. Mr Wittiterly flatters his wife and toadies to her every whim. They are oblivious to the degradation Kate is subjected to under their noses, only concerned that they are being visited by noblemen. Mrs. Wittiterly becomes jealous of Kate. She reprimands Kate for flirting with the noblemen that call, but never allows Kate to miss the visits since it is obvious that she is the reason for the call. Nicholas rescues Kate from their employ, and they are happy to see her go. They do not pay Kate her last salary.
Charles and Ned Cheeryble
Identical twin brothers, wealthy "German-merchants" (merchants who trade internationally) who are as magnanimous as they are jovial. Remembering their humble beginnings, they spend much of their time doing charity work and helping those in need. This generosity leads them to give Nicholas a job and provide for his family, and almost single-handedly revive his faith in the goodness of man. They become key figures in the development of Ralph's defeat and the Nicklebys' happy ending.
Frank Cheeryble
Ned and Charles's nephew, who is just as open-hearted as his uncles. He shares Nicholas's streak of anger when his sense of chivalry is roused; Nicholas first meets him after he has kicked a man for insulting Madeline Bray. He falls in love with Kate and later marries her.
Madeline Bray
A beautiful but destitute young woman. Proud and dutiful to her dying father, she is willing to throw her life away if it means ensuring his comfort. Nicholas falls in love with her at first sight, and she comes to feel the same way about him.
Walter Bray
Madeline's father, formerly a handsome gentleman. He is an extremely selfish man who has wasted his late wife's fortune and living, in ill health, in a slum dwelling with his daughter. He owes vast sums of money to both Ralph and Gride. He maintains a scornful and prideful attitude towards Nicholas. He fools himself that he is acting for the benefit of his daughter by agreeing to her marriage with Gride, but when he realizes what he has done, he dies of grief before the marriage goes through, freeing Madeline from her obligations.
Tim Linkinwater
The Cheerybles' devoted clerk. An elderly, stout, pleasant gentleman, he is jokingly referred to by the Brothers as "a Fierce Lion". He is prone to hyperbole and obstinately refuses to go into retirement. He finds happiness with Miss La Creevy.
The Man Next Door
A madman who lives next to the Nickleby family's cottage in the latter part of the novel. He falls instantly in love with Mrs. Nickleby, and he repeatedly throws vegetables over the wall in their garden as a token of his affections. To Kate's distress, Mrs. Nickleby refuses to believe that her suitor is insane until he suddenly switches his attentions to Miss LaCreevy.

=== The Crummles troupe ===
Mr Vincent Crummles
Head of the Crummles theatrical troupe, a larger-than-life actor-manager who takes Nicholas under his wing. He takes great pride in his profession, but also sometimes yearns for a quieter life, settled down with his wife and children. Eventually, he and his family take their act to America to pursue greater success on the theatrical stage.
Mrs Crummles
Mr Crummles's wife. A formidable but loving presence in the company, she is a great diva, but Dickens leaves the question of her actual ability up to the reader.
Miss Ninetta Crummles, The "Infant Phenomenon"
Daughter of Mr and Mrs Crummles. She is a very prominent member of the Crummles troupe: a dancing part is written for her in every performance, even if there is no place for it. She is supposedly ten years old, but is actually closer to eighteen, having been kept on a steady diet of gin to keep her looking young. (Said to be inspired by English child actress Jean Margaret Davenport, with her parents the inspiration for Vincent and Mrs. Crummles as well.
Mr Folair
A pantomimist with the Crummles company. He is an apt flatterer but does not hesitate to say exactly what he thinks of people once their backs are turned.
Miss Snevellicci
The talented leading lady of the Crummles troupe. She and Nicholas flirt heavily, and there is a mutual attraction, but nothing comes of it. She eventually leaves the troupe to get married.
Mr Lenville
A melodramatic, self-centred tragedian, who becomes jealous of the attention Nicholas is receiving as an actor, and attempts to pull his nose in front of the company, an act which results in the actor himself being knocked down and his cane broken by Nicholas.

== Analysis ==
- Arthur Adrian has examined the effect on Yorkshire schools of their representation in the novel.
- Galia Benzimann has investigated the sociopolitical ramifications and artistic manner of Dickens depiction of Dotheboys School, in the context of boarding school education in northern England and child labour concerns in general.
- Joseph Childers has studied the themes of commerce and business in the novel.
- Carolyn Dever has examined the depiction of emotional states and character in the novel via such genres as melodrama.
- Timothy Gilmore has analysed the presentation of capitalism and commodification in the novel.
- Richard Hannaford has discussed Dickens's use of fairy tale motifs in the novel.
- Mark M. Hennelly Jr. has critiqued various scenes and performances of astonishment as an element of theatricality in the novel.
- Carol Hanbery Mackay has examined the use of techniques of melodrama in the novel.
- Andrew Mangham has studied parallels in depictions away from strict realism between William Hogarth and Dickens, in the specific context of the latter's Nicholas Nickleby.
- Sylvia Manning has examined Dickens use of comic parody in contrast with more serious depictions of similar plot elements in the overall narrative.
- Jerome Meckier has discussed structural aspects of the novel on two levels, the serial structure and the overall single-narrative structure.
- Tore Rem has critiqued the role of the Crummles episodes in the novel.
- Leslie Thompson has evaluated the soliloquies of Mrs. Nickleby in the novel.
- Leona Toker has commented on the presence of elements related to the discourse on Lent, with particular relation to hunger and fasting, in the novel.

== Adaptations ==
There are numerous stage adaptations, including:

- Nicholas Nickleby; or, Doings at Do-The-Boys Hall (1838) by Edward Stirling, which premièred at the Adelphi Theatre and City of London Theatre.
- Nicholas Nickleby and Poor Smike or, The Victim of the Yorkshire School (1839) by William Moncrieff. Dickens's offence at this unauthorised staging prompted him to have Nicholas encounter a "literary gentleman", to whom Nicholas delivers a lengthy and heated condemnation of the practice of adapting still-unfinished books without the author's permission.
- Smike (1973), a musical adaptation written by Simon May, Clive Barnett and Roger Holman.
- The Life and Adventures of Nicholas Nickleby (1980) by David Edgar. Premièred in the West End by the Royal Shakespeare Company, it is longer than eight hours in length. In 2006 Edgar prepared a shorter version for a production at the Chichester Festival.

Film and television adaptations of Nicholas Nickleby include:

- Dotheboys Hall; or, Nicholas Nickleby (1903), directed by Alf Collins. A three-minute short showing the fight scene at Dotheboys Hall.
- Nicholas Nickleby (1912), a half-hour film that attempted to cover most of the novel, featuring Harry Benham as Nicholas.
- The Life and Adventures of Nicholas Nickleby (1947), the first sound film adaptation, starring Derek Bond as Nicholas.
- Nicholas Nickleby (1957), a BBC serial with William Russell in the title role. No episodes survive.
- Nicholas Nickleby (1968), a BBC One series, starring Martin Jarvis. All episodes exist.
- Nicholas Nickleby (1977), a BBC series directed by Christopher Barry, starring Nigel Havers in the title role.
- The Life and Adventures of Nicholas Nickleby (1982), a videotaped version of the Royal Shakespeare Company's stage adaptation, shown on Channel 4. In 1983, it was shown on television in the United States, where it won an Emmy Award for Outstanding Miniseries.
- Nicholas Nickleby (1985), an animated version produced for television by Burbank Films Australia.
- The Life and Adventures of Nicholas Nickleby (2001), an ITV television film directed by Stephen Whittaker, with James D'Arcy as Nicholas. The film won a BAFTA and an RTS Award for costume design.
- Nicholas Nickleby (2002), a film directed by Douglas McGrath.
- Nick Nickleby (2012), a BBC One series with modernised settings. It was filmed in Belfast, Northern Ireland, with mainly local actors.

== Publication ==
Nicholas Nickleby was originally issued in 19 monthly numbers; the last was a double-number and cost two shillings instead of one. Each number comprised 32 pages of text and two illustrations by Phiz:

- I – March 1838 (chapters 1–4);
- II – April 1838 (chapters 5–7);
- III – May 1838 (chapters 8–10);
- IV – June 1838 (chapters 11–14);
- V – July 1838 (chapters 15–17);
- VI – August 1838 (chapters 18–20);
- VII – September 1838 (chapters 21–23);
- VIII – October 1838 (chapters 24–26);
- IX – November 1838 (chapters 27–29);
- X – December 1838 (chapters 30–33);
- XI – January 1839 (chapters 34–36);
- XII – February 1839 (chapters 37–39);
- XIII – March 1839 (chapters 40–42);
- XIV – April 1839 (chapters 43–45);
- XV – May 1839 (chapters 46–48);
- XVI – June 1839 (chapters 49–51);
- XVII – July 1839 (chapters 52–54);
- XVIII – August 1839 (chapters 55–58);
- XIX–XX – September 1839 (chapters 59–65).
