= Yorkshire dialect =

Dialects of English spoken in Yorkshire, England

- Native to: England
- Region: Yorkshire
- Language family: Indo-European: Germanic; West Germanic; Ingvaeonic; Anglo-Frisian; Anglic; Yorkshire dialect
- Early forms: Old English: Northeastern Midlands Middle English; Yorkshire Early Modern English
- Dialects: Traditionally divided between the West Riding, the North Riding, and East Riding dialects. Different varieties exist within the various dialects of Yorkshire, shaped by geography & culture.

Language codes
- ISO 639-3: –
- Location of Yorkshire within England
- Coordinates: 54°N 2°W

Speech example
An example of a male speaker from Leeds (Damien Hirst).

Speech example
An example of a male speaker from Bradford (David Hockney).

Speech example
An example of a male speaker from modern-day South Yorkshire (Lord John Prescott).

Yorkshire dialect, also known as Yorkshire English, Broad Yorkshire, Tyke, or Yorkie, is a grouping of several regionally neighbouring historical and modern dialects of English spoken in Yorkshire. Yorkshire experienced drastic dialect levelling in the 20th century, eroding many traditional features, though variation and even innovations persist, at both the whole regional and sub-regional levels. Organisations such as the Yorkshire Dialect Society and the East Riding Dialect Society exist to promote the survival of the more traditional features.

The dialects have been represented in classic works of literature such as Wuthering Heights, Nicholas Nickleby and The Secret Garden, and linguists have documented variations of the dialects since the 19th century. In the mid-20th century, the Survey of English Dialects collected dozens of recordings of authentic Yorkshire dialects.

== Early history and written accounts ==
Based on fragments of early studies on the dialect, there seem to have been few distinctions across large areas: in the early 14th century, the traditional Northumbrian dialect of Yorkshire showed few differences compared to the dialect spoken in Aberdeen, now often considered a separate Scots language. The dialect has been widely studied since the 19th century, including an early work by William Stott Banks in 1865 on the dialect of Wakefield, and another by Joseph Wright who used an early form of phonetic notation in a description of the dialect of Windhill, near Bradford. Significant works that covered all of England include Alexander John Ellis's 1899 book On Early English Pronunciation, Part V, and the English Dialect Dictionary, which was published in six volumes between 1898 and 1905.

Charles Dickens' Nicholas Nickleby (1839) and Emily Brontë's Wuthering Heights (1847) are notable 19th century works of literature which include examples of contemporary Yorkshire dialects. The following is an excerpt of Brontë's use of contemporary West Riding dialect from Haworth in Wuthering Heights, with a translation to standard English below:

Aw wonder how yah can faishion to stand thear i' idleness un war, when all on 'ems goan out! Bud yah're a nowt, and it's no use talking—yah'll niver mend o'yer ill ways, but goa raight to t' divil, like yer mother afore ye!

I wonder how you can dare to stand there in idleness and worse, when all of them have gone out! But you're a nobody, and it's no use talking—you'll never mend your evil ways, but go straight to the Devil, like your mother before you!

=== 20th-century recordings ===
The Survey of English Dialects in the 1950s, 1960s and 1970s recorded over 30 examples of authentic Yorkshire dialects which can be heard online via the British Library Sound Archive. (Note: Below is a selection of recordings from this archive: Miss Madge Dibnah (b.1890) of Welwick, East Yorkshire, "female housekeeper". According to the Library, "much of her speech remains part of the local dialect to this day".; Cooper Peacock (b.1887) of Muker, North Yorkshire, farmer.; Unidentified of Golcar, West Yorkshire, mill worker.; Mrs Hesselden (b.1882) of Pateley Bridge North Yorkshire.; Ronald Easton (b.1895) of Skelton, North Yorkshire, farmer.)

== Geographic distribution ==
Yorkshire covers a large area, and the dialect is not the same in all areas. In fact, the dialects of the North and East Ridings are fairly different from that of the West Riding, as they display only Northumbrian characteristics rather than the mixture of Northumbrian & Mercian features found in the West Riding. The Yorkshire Dialect Society draws a border roughly at the River Wharfe between two main zones. The area southwest of the river has been influenced by Mercian, originating from the East Midlands dialects during the industrial revolution, whilst that to the northeast, like Geordie, the Cumbrian dialect and the Scots language, is descended more purely from the Northumbrian dialect. The distinction was first made by A. J. Ellis in On Early English Pronunciation. (Note: Ellis also identified a third area around Craven, Ribblesdale, upper Wensleydale and Swaledale as part of his "West Northern" area (numbered Area 31), alongside almost all of Cumbria as well as north Lancashire and south Durham. In the tradition of the Yorkshire Dialect Society, this area is usually grouped with the North Riding dialect.) The division was approved of by Joseph Wright, the founder of the Yorkshire Dialect Society and the author of the English Dialect Dictionary. Investigations at village level by the dialect analysts Stead (1906), Sheard (1945) and Rohrer (1950) mapped a border between the two areas. A rough border between the two areas was mapped by the Swiss linguist Fritz Rohrer, having undertaken village-based research in areas indicated by previous statements by Richard Stead and J.A. Sheard, although there were "buffer areas" in which a mixed dialect was used, such as a large area between Leeds and Ripon, and also at Whitgift, near Goole.

One report explains the geographic difference in detail:

This distinction was first recognised formally at the turn of the 19th / 20th centuries, when linguists drew an isophone diagonally across the county from the northwest to the southeast, separating these two broadly distinguishable ways of speaking. It can be extended westwards through Lancashire to the estuary of the River Lune, and is sometimes called the Humber-Lune Line. Strictly speaking, the dialects spoken south and west of this isophone are Midland dialects, whereas the dialects spoken north and east of it are truly Northern. It is likely that the Midland influence came up into the region with people migrating towards the manufacturing districts of the West Riding during the Industrial Revolution.

Over time, speech has become closer to Standard English and some of the features that once distinguished one town from another have disappeared. In 1945, J. A. Sheard predicted that various influences "will probably result in the production of a standard West Riding dialect", and K. M. Petyt found in 1985 that "such a situation is at least very nearly in existence".

== Pronunciation ==
Some features of Yorkshire pronunciation are general features of northern English accents. Many of them are listed in the northern English accents section on the English English page.

=== Vowels ===
Vowels of North West Yorkshire English on a vowel chart, from Wilhelm (2018:6). The vowel space is compressed downwards, with FACE, GOAT, SQUARE and THOUGHT being given a monophthongal, significantly more open realization [e̞ː, ö̞ː, ɛ̞ː, ɒ̝ː] than in RP and Scottish English. Conversely, FLEECE and GOOSE are realized as wide, Cockney-like diphthongs [əɪ, əʉ].

- Words such as strut, cut, blood, lunch usually take [ʊ], although [ə] is a middle-class variant.
- Most words affected by the trap-bath split of South East England – the distinction between the sounds [a] and [ɑː] – are not affected in Yorkshire. The long [ɑː] of southern English is widely disliked in the "bath"-type words. However, words such as palm, can't, spa are pronounced with a long vowel, usually more fronted [aː].
- In parts of the West Riding, none, one, once, nothing, tongue, among(st) are pronounced with [ɒ] rather than [ʊ] A shibboleth for a traditional Huddersfield accent is the word love as [lɒv], pronounced with the same vowel as "lot".
- Words such as late, face, say, game are pronounced with a monophthong [eː] or [ɛː]. However, words with ⟨gh⟩ in the spelling (e.g. straight, weight), as well as exclamations and interjections such as hey and eh (the tag question), are usually pronounced with a diphthong [ɛɪ]. Some words with ake at the end may be pronounced with [ɛ], as in take to tek, make to mek and sake to sek (but not for bake or cake).
- Words with the vowel /əʊ/ in Received Pronunciation, as in goat, may have a monophthong [oː] or [ɔː]. In a recent trend, a fronted monophthong [ɵː] is common amongst young women, although this has been the norm for a long time in Hull (where it originates). It has developed only since 1990, yet it has now spread to Bradford.
- If a close vowel precedes /l/, a schwa may be inserted. This gives [iəl] for /iːl/ and (less frequently) [uəl] for /uːl/.
- When /ɛ/ precedes /r/ in a stressed syllable, /ɛ/ can become [ə]. For example, very can be pronounced [vəɹɪ].
- In Hull, Middlesbrough and the east coast, the sound in word, heard, nurse, etc. is pronounced in the same way as in square, dare. This is [ɛː]. The set of words with /ɪə/, such as near, fear, beard, etc., may have a similar pronunciation but remains distinctive as [iɛ].
  - In other parts of Yorkshire, this sound is a short [ə] or long [ɜː]. This seems to have developed as an intermediate form between the older form [ɒ~ʊ] (now very rare in these words) and the RP pronunciation [əː].
- In Hull, Middlesbrough and much of the East Riding, the phoneme /aɪ/ (as in prize) may become a monophthong [aː] before a voiced consonant. For example, five becomes [faːv] (fahv), prize becomes [pʰɹaːz] (prahz). This does not occur before voiceless consonants, so "price" is [pʰɹaɪs].
- In the south of the west riding, Middle English /uː/ is traditionally realised as a monophthong [aː] or in the Holme Valley as a diphthong [ɛə] as in daan, abaat, naa, haa, and aat for down, about, now, how and out.
  - The traditional pronunciation of these words is [u:] in the east riding and the eastern part of the north riding; in the western half of the north riding and northern west riding it is [əu] as in doon, aboot, noo, hoo, oot.These are now far less common than the RP [aʊ] found throughout Yorkshire.
- Words like city and many are pronounced with a final [ɛ~e] in the Sheffield area.
- What would be a schwa on the end of a word in other accents is realised as [ɛ] in Hull and Middlesbrough.
- A prefix to a word is more likely not to take a reduced vowel sound in comparison to the same prefix's vowel sound in other accents. For example, concern is [kʰɒnˈsɜːn] or [kʰɒnˈsɛːn] rather than [kʰənˈsɜːn], and admit is [adˈmɪt] rather than [ədˈmɪt].
- In some areas of the Yorkshire Dales (e.g. Dent, Sedbergh), the FLEECE vowel can be eɪ so that me is [meɪ] and green is [greɪn].

The following features are recessive or even extinct; generally, they are less common amongst younger than older speakers in modern Yorkshire:

- Words originating from old English ō (e.g. goose, root, cool, roof, hoof) historically had an [ʊɪ] sound in the West Riding word-medially (ɡooise, rooit, cooil, rooif, hooif) as well as an [jʊ~ɪə] sound in the North and East Ridings (ɡeease, reeat, keeal, reeaf, yuf). Today a more RP-like pronunciation [ʊu] is found in all Yorkshire accents.
- Traditionally in the West Riding, in word final environments and before [k], ō is realised as the vowel [ʊu] in words such as book, cook, and look, this also occurred in the east and north ridings, where it was realised before [k] as an /iu/ and as /iː/ in word final environments.
- Traditionally words such as "swear", "there", "wear" take the diphthong [iə], often written sweer, theer, weer in dialect writing. This sound may also be used in words originating from Old English ēa, commonly spelt ea in standard english spelling: for example, head as [iəd] (heead), red as [riəd] (reead) leaves as [liəvz] (leeavs).
- [eɪ] may take the place of /iː/, especially in the West Riding in words such as key, meat, speak, either, with the second two often written meyt, speyk in dialect writing.
- Words such as door, floor, four, board may take on a variety of diphthongal pronunciations, [uə, oə, ɔə, ʊə]. This is a consequence of an incomplete horse–hoarse merger.
- Words which once had a velar fricative in Old and Middle English or a vocalised consonant may have [oʊ~ɔʊ] for /ɔː/ (e.g. browt, thowt, nowt, owt, grow, gowd, bowt for brought, thought, nought, ought, grow, gold, bolt).
- Words that end -ight join the FLEECE lexical set. Today they can still be heard in their dialectal forms. For example, neet [niːt] and reet [ɹiːt] for night and right. This can also be heard in Nova Scotia, Geordie and the Lancashire dialect.
- Historically there was a four-way split whereby a diphthong [ɔʊ] (west riding) or [au] (north and east ridings) exists in words subject to vocalisation in middle English (e.g. grow, glow, bow, bowt, fowk, nowt, owt for grow, glow, bow, bought, folk, nought, ought respectively"). The Os in some words are pronounced as [ɒ], such as oppen, brokken, wokken for open, broken, woken. Other words spelled ow were pronounced with an aw sound [ɒː] such as knaw, snaw, blaw for know, snow, blow, from Old English āw. An [ɒɪ] (west riding) or [ʊə] (north and east ridings) sound was found in words that were subject to lengthening of Old English [o] in middle English such as coil, hoil in the West Riding and cooal, hooal in the North and East Ridings for coal, hole . Another was [ʊə] (west riding) or [ja~ɪə~eː] (north and east ridings) that originated from old English ā (e.g. West Riding booan, hooam, booath, looaf, mooast and North and East Riding beean, yam, baith, leeaf, maist for bone, home, both, loaf, most). This four-way split was found throughout all of northern England and contrasted with the historic two-way split found in the south and midlands.

=== Consonants ===
- In some areas, an originally voiced consonant followed by a voiceless one can be pronounced as voiceless. For example, Bradford may be pronounced as if it were Bratford, with [t] (although more likely with a glottal stop, [ʔ]) instead of the [d] employed in most English accents. (Bradford is also pronounced as Bra'fd). Absolute is often pronounced as if it were apsolute, with a [p] in place of the [b].
- As with most dialects of English, final [ŋ] sound in, for example, hearing and eating are often reduced to [n]. However, [ŋɡ] can be heard in Sheffield.
- H-dropping is common in informal speech, especially amongst the working classes.
- Omission of final stops /d, t/ and fricatives /f, θ, ð/, especially in function words. As in other dialects, with can be reduced to wi, especially before consonants. Was is also often reduced to wa (pronounced roughly as "woh"), even when not in contracted negative form (see table below).
- A glottal stop may also be used to replace /k/ (e.g. like becomes [laɪʔ]) at the end of a syllable.
- In the Middlesbrough area, glottal reinforcement occurs for /k, p, t/.
- In Leeds and other areas, an alveolar tap [ɾ] (a 'tapped r') has been used after a labial (pray, bright, frog), after a dental (three), and intervocalically (very, sorry, pair of shoes).

Some consonant changes amongst the younger generation are typical of younger speakers across England, but are not part of the traditional dialect:

- Th-fronting so that [f, v] for /θ, ð/ (although Joseph Wright noted th-fronting in the Windhill area in 1892).
- T-glottalisation: a more traditional pronunciation is to realise /t/ as [r] in certain phrases, which leads to pronunciation spellings such as gerroff.
- R-labialization: Possible [ʋ] for /r/.

The following are typical of the older generation:

- In Sheffield, cases of initial "th" /ð/ become [d]. This pronunciation has led to Sheffielders being given the nickname "dee dahs" (the local forms of "thee" and "thou"/"tha").
- /ɡ, k/ realised as [d, t] before /l/. For example, clumsy becomes [tlʊmzɛ].

==== Rhoticity ====
At the time of the Survey of English Dialects, most places in Yorkshire were non-rhotic, but full rhoticity could be found in Swaledale, Lonsdale, Ribblesdale, and the rural area west of Halifax and Huddersfield. In addition, the area along the east coast of Yorkshire retained rhoticity when /r/ was in final position though not when it was in preconsonantal position (e.g. farmer [ˈfaːmɚ]). A 1981 MA study found that rhoticity persisted in the towns of Hebden Bridge, Lumbutts, and Todmorden in Upper Calderdale.

Rhoticity seems to have been more widespread in Yorkshire in the late 19th and early 20th centuries: for example, the city of Wakefield was marked as rhotic in the works of A. J. Ellis, and the recording of a prisoner of war from Wakefield in the Berliner Lautarchiv displays rhotic speech, but the speech of Wakefield nowadays is firmly non-rhotic.

=== Further information ===
These features can be found in the English Accents and Dialects collection on the British Library website. This website features samples of Yorkshire (and elsewhere in England) speech in wma format, with annotations on phonology in X-SAMPA substitutions of IPA phonetic transcription, lexis and grammar.

See also Wells (1982), section 4.4.

== Vocabulary and grammar ==
A list of non-standard grammatical features of Yorkshire speech is given below. In formal settings, these features are castigated and, as a result, their use is recessive. They are most common among older speakers and among the working class.

- Definite article reduction: shortening of the to a form without a vowel, often written t'. See this overview and a more detailed page on the Yorkshire Dialect website, and also Jones (2002). This is most likely to be a glottal stop [ʔ], although traditionally it was [t] or (in the areas that border Lancashire) [θ].
- Some dialect words persist, although most have fallen out of use. The use of owt and nowt, derived from Old English a wiht and ne wiht, mean anything and nothing, as well as summat to mean something. They are pronounced [aʊt] and [naʊt] in North Yorkshire, but as [ɔʊt] and [nɔʊt] in most of the rest of Yorkshire. Other examples of dialect still in use include flayed (sometimes flayt) (scared), laik (play), roar (cry), aye (yes), nay (emphatic "no"), and all (also), anyroad (anyway) and afore (before).
- When making a comparison such as greater than or lesser than, the word "nor" can be used in place of "than", e.g. better nor him.
- Nouns describing units of value, weight, distance, height and sometimes volumes of liquid have no plural marker. For example, ten pounds becomes ten pound; five miles becomes five mile.
- The word us is often used in place of me or in the place of our (e.g. we should put us names on us property). Us is invariably pronounced with a final [z] rather than an [s].
- Use of the singular second-person pronoun thou (often written tha) and thee. This is a T form in the T–V distinction, and is largely confined to male speakers.
- Were can be used in place of was when connected to a singular pronoun. The reverse – i.e. producing constructions such as we was and you was – is also heard in a few parts of Yorkshire (e.g. Doncaster).
- While is often used in the sense of until (e.g. Unless we go at a fair lick, we'll not be home while seven.). Stay here while it shuts might cause a non-local to think that they should stay there during its shutting, when the order really indicates that they should stay only until it shuts. Joseph Wright wrote in the English Dialect Dictionary that this came from a shortening of the older word while-ever.
- The word self may become sen, e.g. yourself becomes thy sen, tha sen.
- Similar to other English dialects, using the word them to mean those is common, e.g. This used to be a pub back i them days.
- The word reight/reet is used to mean very or really, e.g. If Aw'm honest, Aw'm nut reight bother'd abaat it.
- As in many non-standard dialects, double negatives are common, e.g. I was never scared of nobody.
- The relative pronoun may be what or as rather than that, e.g. other people what I've heard and He's a man as likes his drink. Alternatively there may be no relative pronoun, e.g. I've a sister lives there.
- "Yon" to mean "that over there" is still used in some areas.
- Many words, and in particular place names, reflect Old Norse influences due to Scandinavian settlement in Yorkshire during the Old English period. Examples include the -thorpe ending in names like Middlethorpe, Linthorpe, etc.

=== Contracted negatives ===
In informal Yorkshire speech, negatives may be more contracted than in other varieties of English. These forms are shown in the table below. Although the final consonant is written as [t], this may be realised as [ʔ], especially when followed by a consonant.

Word	Primary Contraction	Secondary Contraction
isn't	ɪznt	ɪnt
wasn't	wɒznt	wɒnt
doesn't	dʊznt	dʊnt
didn't	dɪdnt	dɪnt
couldn't	kʊdnt	kʊnt
shouldn't	ʃʊdnt	ʃʊnt
wouldn't	wʊdnt	wʊnt
oughtn't	ɔːtnt	ɔːnt
needn't	niːdnt	niːnt
mightn't	maɪtnt	maɪnt
mustn't	mʊsnt	mʊnt (uncommon)
hasn't	haznt	ant
haven't	havnt	ant

Hadn't does not become reduced to [ant]. This may be to avoid confusion with hasn't or haven't, which can both be realised as [ant].

== Examples of traditional dialect ==
=== Examples of West Riding Yorkshire dialect ===
The following samples come from the English Dialect Society's 1892 Grammar of the Dialect of Windhill by Joseph Wright, mostly following its narrow phonetic spellings, though with certain symbols updated to align with modern International Phonetic Association conventions, such as short ⟨e⟩ rendered as [ɛ], short ⟨i⟩ as [ɪ], short ⟨u⟩ as [ʊ], etc. and standardised IPA symbols for all consonants.

West Riding dialect (Windhill), c. 1892		Standard English
I met him ivvery day.	[a mɛr ɪm ˈɪvrɪ dɛə]	I met him every day.
We'll go when ta'rt ready	[wɪl ɡʊə wɛn tət ˈrɛdɪ]	We'll go when you're ready.
Well as I wor sayin', shoo'd tell ye hah, wheer, an' when shoo fand t'drukken hahnd 'at shoo calls her husband.	[wɛl əz a wə sɛ(ə)ɪn ʃuːd tɛl jə aː wɪə(r) ən wɛn ʃə fanˈdːrʊkŋ̩ aːnd ət ʃə kɔəlz ər ˈʊzbn̩]	Well as I was saying, she would tell you how, where, and when she found the drunken hound that she calls her husband.
Ye see nah 'at I'm reyt abaht that little lass comin' fro t'schooil yonder. Shoo's goin dahn t'rooad theer threw t'red gate o' t'lefthand side o' t'way. Suar eniff, t'barn's goan streyt up to t'door o' t'reng hahse.	[jə siː naː ət ɪm rɛɪ̯t ə'baːt ðat ˈlɪtl̩ las ˈkʊmɪn frətˈskuɪl ˈjɒndə(r)], [shʊz gu(ə)ɪn daːnˈtrʊəd ðɪə θrɪʊ̯ˈtrɛd geət əˈtlɛftand saɪd əˈtwɛə], [sɪʊ̯ər ɪˈnɪf tbaːnz gʊən strɛɪ̯t ʊp tə dːʊər əˈtrɛŋ aːs]	You see now that I'm right about that little girl coming from the school over there. She's going down the road there through the red gate at the lefthand side of the way. Sure enough the child's gone straight up to the door of the wrong house.
They don't call it t'greasy miln for nowt. Tuesday's awlus been my weshin' day for these six year back or more. I awlus put t'tloaze to steep t'neet afore an' get up at five o'clock i' t'mornin.	[ðə dʊənt kɔəl ɪˈtɡrɪəzɪ mɪln fə nɒʊ̯t. ˈtɪʊ̯zdəz ˈɔləs biːn maɪ̯ ˈwɛʃɪn dɛə fə ðɪəz sɪks jɪə bak ə mʊə(r)], [a ˈɔləs pʊˈtːlʊəz tə stiːp ˈtniːt əˈfʊə(r) ən gɛt ʊp ət faɪ̯v əˈtlɒk ɪˈtmɔənɪn]	They don't call it the greasy mill for nothing. Tuesday's always been my washing day for these six years back or more. I always put the clothes to steep the night before and get up at five o'clock in the morning.
I suppose I've as mitch reyt to hing my tloaze aht as tha hez ta hing thine.	[a spʊəz av əz mɪtʃ rɛɪ̯t tə ɪŋ maɪ̯ tlʊəz ʊp əz ða ɛz tə ɪŋ ðaɪ̯n]	I suppose I've as much right to hang my clothes out as you have to hang yours.
I could hardly believe my awn een.	[a kəd ˈaːdlɪ bəˈliːv mɪ ɔən iːn]	I could hardly believe my own eyes.
I doan't knaw what t'man did wi't. Uz at's done so mitch for him may go to t' dogs for owt he cares .	[a dʊənt nɔə wɒˈtːman dɪd wɪt], [ʊz əts dʊn sə mɪtʃ fɒr ɪm mə ɡʊə tə dːɒɡz fər ɒʊ̯t iː kɛəz]	I don't know what the man did with it. We who have done so much for him may go to the dogs for aught (anything) he cares.
Shoo wor that badly whol they thowt shoo'd nivver mend.	[ʃuː wə ðat ˈbadlɪ wɒl ðə θɒʊ̯t ʃəd ˈnɪvə mɛnd]	She was so ill that they thought she would never get better.

=== Examples of North Riding Yorkshire dialect ===
The following samples come from Cambridge Press's 1915 Dialect of Hackness by George Herbert Cowling, mostly following its narrow phonetic spellings, though with certain symbols updated to align with modern International Phonetic Association conventions, such as short ⟨i⟩ rendered as [ɪ] and short ⟨u⟩ as [ʊ].

North Riding dialect (Hackness), c. 1915		Standard English
I's gyin when I's weel ineäf.	[ɑz gɑɪn wen ɑz wɪjɫ ɪˈniəf]	I'm going when I'm well enough.
They carried her i' t' hoose iv a fit.	[ðə ˈkɑɹɪd əɹ ɪˈtʊws ɪv ə fɪt]	They carried her into the house in a fit.
Gif thoo'd ha' telled him, he'd ha' comed.	[gɪf ˈðʊwd ə teɫd ɪm ˈɪd ə kʊmd]	If you would have told him, he would have come.
Thoo knaws I's a chap at likes sense, same as thy faither.	[ðʊw nɔːz ɑz ə tʃɑp ət ɫɛjks sens siəm əz ðɪ ˈfɛəðə(ɹ)]	You know I'm a man that likes sense, the same as your father.
T' moral o' this tale is fost, at neäbody owt tae think hissen a better chap nor other fowk, and mak fun on 'em.	[ˈtmɔɹəɫ ə ðɪs tiəɫ ɪz fɔst ɑt ˈniəbɔdɪ ɔwt tɪ θɪŋk ɪzˈsen ə ˈbet̪θə tʃɑp nəɹ ˈʊðə fɔwk ən mɑk fʊn ɔn əm]	The moral of this tale is, first, that nobody ought to think himself a better chap than other folk, and make fun of them.
Is't better nor I iver thowt? Nay, it's war.	[ɪst ˈbet̪θə nəɹ ɑ ɪvə θɔwt], [niə ɪts wɑːɹ]	Is it better than I ever thought? No, it's worse.
T' prickly-backt urchin war allus even wiv him. Ivery time at t' awd hare cam tae t' top or t' bottom of t' furrow, t' urchin or his wife shooted: 'Here I is.'	['tprɪklɪ bɑkt 'ɔtʃn̩ wər 'ɔːləs 'ɪjvn̩ wɪv ɪm], ['ɪvrɪ tɑːm ət tɔːd ɛə kɑm tɪ'tːɔp ə'tbɔdm̩ ə'tfɔɹə 'tɔtʃn̩ əɹ ɪz wɛjf ˈʃʊwtɪd iəɹ ɑ ɪz]	The hedgehog was always even with him. Every time that the old hare came to the top or the bottom of the furrow, the hedgehog or his wife shouted: 'Here I am.'
I's nut quite fit. I hate tae deä things iv a despert hurry. I'll just gang away yam and hev a bite, and I'll meet thee up here iv aboot hauf an hoor.	[ɑz nʊt kwɛjt fɪt], [ɑ ɛət tɪ diə θɪŋz ɪv ə 'despət 'ɔɹɪ], [ɑɫ dʒʊst gɑn əˈwɛə jɑm, ən ev ə bɛjt ən ɑɫ mɪjt ðɪj ʊp iəɹ ɪv ə'bʊwt ɔːf ən ʊwəɹ]	I'm not quite ready. I hate to do things in a great hurry. I'll just go away home and have a bite, and I'll meet you up here in about half an hour.

== Vocabulary comparison of Yorkshire dialects, c. 1900 ==
The following pronunciations come from Wright's A Grammar of the Dialect of Windhill and Cowling's The Dialect of Hackness, as introduced in the previous section.

Standard English	West Riding dialect (Windhill)		North Riding dialect (Hackness)	
I	I	[aɪ̯] (stressed) [a]/[ɪ](unstressed)	I	[ɑː] (stressed) [ɑ] (unstressed)
Thou	Thou/Thah/Tha	[ðaː] (stressed)/ [ða] (unstressed)	Thou/Thoo	[ðʊw] (stressed) [ðʊ] (unstressed)
We	We	[wiː] (Stressed) [wɪ] (unstressed)	We	[wɪj] (Stressed) [wɪ] (unstressed)
This	This (here)	[ðɪs (iə(r))]	This (here)	[ðɪs (iə(ɹ))]
That	That (theer)	[ðat (ðiə(r))]	That (theer)	[ðɑt (ðiə(ɹ))]
Who	Who	[ʊə]	Wheä	[wiə]
What	What	[wɒt]	What	[wɑt]
Not	Nut/Noan	[nət]/[nʊən]	Nut	[nʊt]
All	All	[oəl]	All	[ɔːɫ]
Many	Monny	[ˈmɒnɪ]	Monny	[ˈmɔnɪ]
One	One	[wʊn]	Yan (substantive) Yaa (determiner)	[jɑn] (substantive) [jɑː] (determiner)
Big	Big	[bɪɡ]	Big	[bɪɡ]
Long	Leng/Long	[leŋ]/[lɒŋ]	Lang	[ɫɑŋ]
Small/Little	Small/Little	[smoəl]/[ˈlɪtl̩]	Laatle	[ˈɫɑːtɫ̩]
Woman	Woman	[ˈwʊmən]	Woman/Wench	[ˈwʊmən]/[wenʃ]
Man	Man	[man]	Man/Carl	[mɑn]/[kɑːɫ]
Dog	Dog	[dɒɡ]	Dog/Hoond	[dɔɡ]/[ʊwnd]
Root	Rooit	[ruɪt]	Reät	[ɹiət]
Skin	Skin/Hide	[skɪn]/[aɪ̯d]	Skin	[skɪn]
Blood	Blooid	[bluɪd]	Bleäd	[bɫiəd]
Bone	Boan	[bʊən]	Beän	[biən]
Hair	Hair	[eə(r)]	Hair	[ɛə(ɹ)]
Head	Heead	[ɪəd]	Heäd/Noddle	[iəd]/[nɔdl̩]
Ear	Ear	[ɪə(r)]	Ear/Lug	[iə(ɹ)]/[ɫʊɡ]
Eye	Ee	[iː]	Ee	[ɪj]
Nose	Noase	[nʊəz]	Nose/Neäse	[nuəz]/[niəz]
Tooth	Tooith	[tuɪθ]	Teäth	[tiəθ]
Claw	Claw	[tloə]	Claw	[kɫɔː]
Foot	Fooit	[fuɪt]	Feät	[fiət]
Belly	Belly/Guts	[bɛlɪ]/[ɡʊts]	Belly/Weäm	[beɫɪ]/[wiəm]
Breast	Breast	[brɛst]	Breest	[bɹɪjst]
Heart	Heart	[aːt]	Heart	[ɑːt]
To drink	To drink/ To sup	[tə drɪŋk]/ [tə sʊp]	Tae drink/ Tae sup	[tɪ d̪ðɹɪŋk]/ [tɪ sʊp]
To eat	To eyt	[tə eɪ̯t]	Tae it	[tɪ ɪt]
To know	To knaw	[tə noə]	Tae knaw	[tɪ nɔː]
To die	To dee	[tə diː]	Tae dee	[tɪ dɪj]
To walk	To walk	[tə woək]	Tae walk	[tɪ wɔːk]
To work	To work	[tə wəːk] (noun: [waːk])	Tae work	[tɪ wɔɹk] (noun: wɑːk)
To come	To come	[tə kʊm]	Tae come	[tɪ kʊm]
To lie (down)	To lig	[tə lɪɡ]	Tae lig	[tɪ ɫɪɡ]
To give	To give	[tə ɡɪ(v)]	Tae gi(v)e	[tɪ ɡɪ(v)]
Moon	Mooin	[muɪn]	Meän	[miən]
Water	Watter	[ˈwɒtə(r)]	Watter	[wɑt̪θə(ɹ)]
Stone	Stoan	[stʊən]	Steän	[stiən]
Earth	Eearth	[ɪəθ]	Yeth, Oth	[jeθ], [ɔθ]
Smoke	Rick	[rɪk]	Smewk/Reek	[smiwk]/[ɹɪjk]
Fire	Fire	[faɪ̯ə(r)]	Fire	[fɛjə(ɹ)]
Ash	Ass	[as]	Ass	[ɑs]
Path	Path	[paθ]	Path/Trod	[pɑθ]/[t̪θɹɔd]
Red	Red	[rɛd]	Reäd	[ɹiəd]
Yellow	Yolla	[jɒlə]	Yallow/Blake	[jɑɫə]/[bɫiək]
Night	Neet	[niːt]	Neet	[nɪjt]
Hot	Hut	[ʊt]	Heat	[iət]
Cold	Cowd	[kɒʊ̯d]	Cawd	[kɔːd]
New	New	[niʊ̯]	New	[niw]
Good	Gooid	[ɡuɪd]	Good(ish)	[ɡʊd(ɪʃ)]

== In popular culture ==
Wilfred Pickles, a Yorkshireman born in Halifax, was selected by the BBC as an announcer for its North Regional radio service; he went on to be an occasional newsreader on the BBC Home Service during World War II. He was the first newsreader to speak in a regional accent rather than Received Pronunciation, "a deliberate attempt to make it more difficult for Nazis to impersonate BBC broadcasters", and caused some comment with his farewell catchphrase "... and to all in the North, good neet".

The director Ken Loach has set several of his films in South or West Yorkshire and has stated that he does not want actors to deviate from their natural accent. The relevant films by Loach include Kes (Barnsley), Days of Hope (lead actor from Denby Dale), The Price of Coal (South Yorkshire and Wakefield), The Gamekeeper (Sheffield), Looks and Smiles (Sheffield) and The Navigators (South and West Yorkshire). Loach's films were used in a French dialectological analysis on changing speech patterns in South Yorkshire. Loach said in his contribution that the speech in his recently released film The Navigators was less regionally-marked than in his early film Kes because of changing speech patterns in South Yorkshire, which the authors of the article interpreted as a move towards a more standard dialect of English.

Dialect of the northern dales featured in the series All Creatures Great and Small.

A number of popular bands hail from Yorkshire and have distinctive Yorkshire accents. Singer-songwriter YUNGBLUD, originating from Doncaster, preserves a strong Yorkshire accent. Louis Tomlinson, who was a member of One Direction, is from Yorkshire and in his solo music his accent is often heard. Joe Elliott and Rick Savage, vocalist and bassist of Def Leppard; Alex Turner, vocalist of the Arctic Monkeys; Jon McClure, of Reverend and The Makers; Jon Windle, of Little Man Tate; Jarvis Cocker, vocalist of Pulp; and Joe Carnall, of Milburn and Phil Oakey of The Human League are all known for their Sheffield accents, whilst The Cribs, who are from Netherton, sing in a Wakefield accent. The Kaiser Chiefs originate in Leeds, as does the Brett Domino Trio, the musical project of comedian Rod J. Madin. Graham Fellows, in his persona as John Shuttleworth, uses his Sheffield accent, though his first public prominence was as cockney Jilted John. Toddla T, a former DJ on BBC Radio 1 and 1Xtra, has a strong Sheffield accent and often used on air the phrase "big up thysen" (an adaptation into Yorkshire dialect of the slang term "big up yourself" which is most often used in the music and pop culture of the Jamaican diaspora). Similarly, grime crews such as Scumfam use a modern Sheffield accent, which still includes some dialect words.

The Lyke Wake Dirge, written in old North Riding Dialect, was set to music by the folk band Steeleye Span. Although the band was not from Yorkshire, they attempted Yorkshire pronunciations in words such as "light" and "night" as /li:t/ and /ni:t/.

Actor Sean Bean normally speaks with a Yorkshire accent in his acting roles, as does actor Matthew Lewis, famously known for playing Neville Longbottom in the Harry Potter films.

Wallace of Wallace and Gromit, voiced by Peter Sallis, has his accent from Holme Valley of West Yorkshire, despite the character living in nearby Lancashire. Sallis has said that creator Nick Park wanted a Lancashire accent, but Sallis could only manage to do a Yorkshire one.

The late British Poet Laureate, Ted Hughes originated from Mytholmroyd, close to the border with Lancashire, and spent much of his childhood in Mexborough, South Yorkshire. His own readings of his work were noted for his "flinty" or "granite" voice and "distinctive accent" and some said that his Yorkshire accent affected the rhythm of his poetry.

The soap opera Emmerdale, formerly Emmerdale Farm, was noted for use of broad Yorkshire, but the storylines involving numerous incomers have diluted the dialect until it is hardly heard.

In the ITV Edwardian/interwar period drama Downton Abbey, set at a fictional country estate in North Yorkshire between Thirsk and Ripon, many of the servants and nearly all of the local villagers have Yorkshire accents. BBC One series Happy Valley and Last Tango in Halifax, both from creator Sally Wainwright of Huddersfield, also heavily feature Yorkshire accents.

In the HBO television series Game of Thrones, many of the characters from the North of Westeros speak with Yorkshire accents, matching the native dialect of Sean Bean, who plays Lord Eddard "Ned" Stark.

Several of the dwarfs in the Peter Jackson film adaptation of The Hobbit, namely Thorin Oakenshield, Kíli and Fili, speak with Yorkshire accents.

The character of the Fat Controller in the Thomas and Friends TV series, as voiced by Michael Angelis, has a broad Yorkshire accent.

"On Ilkla Moor Baht 'at", a popular folk song, is sung in the Yorkshire dialect and accent and considered to be the unofficial anthem of Yorkshire.

Actress Jodie Whittaker keeps her native Yorkshire accent in her role as the Thirteenth Doctor in Doctor Who.

The freeware action game Poacher by Ben "Yahtzee" Croshaw features Yorkshireman as a protagonist and majority of the in-game dialogues is done in Yorkshire dialect.

Studies have shown that accents in the West Riding (that is, mostly, modern West and South Yorkshire), and by extension local dialects, are well-liked among Britons and associated with common sense, loyalty, and reliability.

== Resources on traditional Yorkshire dialect ==
External videos
- 5 YouTube videos
- Knur & Spell (Explanation of the game of Knur and Spell via commentary in West Riding dialect)
- Yestie (Recital of the prose text "Yestie" in the Huddersfield Variety of West Riding dialect) (as spoken by Barbara Stinchcombe)
- Yorkshire Dialect (Spotlight on East Riding dialect) (as spoken by Irwin Bielby)
- Yorkshire Dialect Recording (1952) Traditional Recipe for White Bread (a walkthrough of a traditional white bread recipe in North Riding dialect) (as spoken by Mrs Hesselden)
- Locks Down 3 Video 1 (Humorous anecdotes in North Riding dialect) (as spoken by Adam Collier)

=== Books showcasing the dialect ===
- Yorkshire Ditties (Series 1) by John Hartley
- Yorkshire Ditties (Series 2) by John Hartley
- Yorkshire Puddin' by John Hartley, 1876
- Yorkshire Tales (Series 3) by John Hartley
- Yorkshire Dialect Poems (1673–1915) and traditional poems by Frederic William Moorman
- Songs of the Ridings by Frederic William Moorman
- A Yorkshire Dialect Reciter compiled by George H. Cowling, author of "A Yorkshire Tyke", "The Dialect of Hackness", &c. London: Folk Press Ltd, [1926]
- A Kind of Loving and Joby by Stan Barstow (specifically that of Dewsbury and Ossett)
- Most of the dialogue in GB84 by David Peace
- A Kestrel for a Knave, later turned into the film Kes
- (Parts of) The Secret Garden by Frances Hodgson Burnett
- (Parts of) Wuthering Heights by Emily Brontë (very old-fashioned Haworth dialect)

== Bibliography ==
- Jones, Mark J. (2002), "The origin of Definite Article Reduction in northern English dialects: evidence from dialect allomorphy", English Language and Linguistics, 6 (2), Cambridge University Press: 325–345, doi:10.1017/S1360674302000266, S2CID 122172283
- Petyt, Keith M. (1985), 'Dialect' and 'Accent' in Industrial West Yorkshire, John Benjamins Publishing Company, ISBN 9027279497
- Reader's Digest (1964), Complete Atlas of the British Isles, The Reader's Digest
- Stoddart, Jana; Upton, Clive; Widdowson, J. D. A. (1999), "Sheffield dialect in the 1990s: revisiting the concept of NORMs", Urban Voices, London: Arnold, pp. 72–89
- Watt, Dominic; Tillotson, Jennifer (2001), "A spectrographic analysis of vowel fronting in Bradford English" (PDF), English World-Wide, 22 (2): 269–302, doi:10.1075/eww.22.2.05wat, archived from the original (PDF) on 2 December 2016
- Wells, John C. (1982), Accents of English, Vol. 2: The British Isles (pp. i–xx, 279–466), Cambridge University Press, doi:10.1017/CBO9780511611759, ISBN 0-52128540-2
- Wilhelm, Stephen (2018), "Segmental and suprasegmental change in North West Yorkshire – a new case of supralocalisation?", Corela, HS-24 (HS-24), CerLiCO, doi:10.4000/corela.5203, S2CID 150150043
- Williams, Ann; Kerswill, Paul (1999), "Dialect levelling: change and continuity in Milton Keynes, Reading and Hull" (PDF), in Foulkes, Paul; Docherty, Gerard (eds.), Urban voices. Accent studies in the British Isles., London: Arnold, pp. 141–162, archived from the original (PDF) on 16 September 2012
