= The Price of Coal =

- Also known as: The Price of Coal: Meet the People; The Price of Coal: Back to Reality
- Genre: Comedy drama
- Written by: Barry Hines
- Directed by: Ken Loach
- Country of origin: United Kingdom
- Original language: English

Production
- Producer: Tony Garnett
- Cinematography: Brian Tufano
- Running time: 75 mins 95 minutes

Original release
- Network: BBC1
- Release: 29 March – 5 April 1977

The Price of Coal is a two-part television drama written by Barry Hines and directed by Ken Loach first broadcast as part of the Play for Today series in 1977. Set at the fictional Milton Colliery, near Barnsley in South Yorkshire, the episodes contrast "efforts made to cosmetically improve the pit in preparation for a royal visit (part one) and the target-conscious safety shortcuts that precipitate a fatal accident (part two)".

The plot bears some similarities to the Cadeby Main pit disaster of July 1912, which occurred whilst the King and Queen were visiting pit villages in Yorkshire. This disaster is discussed by managers in the first episode, who refer to the timing of the disaster at the same time as the visit as "bad luck".

== Language ==
Characters almost entirely use Yorkshire dialect and the episodes have been shown with subtitles even when broadcast in England. Some characters have north-eastern accents, in a reference to the migration of displaced colliers from the run-down coalfields in Durham and Northumberland to the richer Yorkshire coalfield in the 1960s. The plays contain an unusually large amount of swearing for a BBC production in the 1970s. This becomes part of the plot in the first episode, as the management ask the miners not to swear during the royal visit. When signs are put up in the pit baths to forbid swearing, the miners attempt to speak in Received Pronunciation to mock the language of the royal family.

== Plot ==
The first episode, Meet the People, is a comedy-drama dealing with preparations for an official visit to the colliery by Prince Charles. The humour revolves around the expensive and ludicrous preparations required for an official visit from a member of the Royal Family. Some workers recognise this and cannot take it seriously. Management recognises it but has to 'play the game'. Special toilets must be constructed "just in case" and destroyed after the visit. A worker is instructed to paint a brick holding up a window. On the eve of the visit, the slogan "Scargill rules OK" is painted on a wall. The manager comments "When I find out who did that I'll string him up by his knackers". In another scene, an argument takes place in a pub between colliers opposed to the expenditure on the visit and who think the colliery was chosen because its union officials were relatively conservative; and other colliers who are looking forward to the visit. The second episode, Back to Reality, takes place a month later and deals with an underground explosion that kills several miners and follows the attempts to rescue others that remain trapped.

== Cast ==
- Bobby Knutt as Sid Storey
- Rita May as Kath Storey
- Paul Chappell as Tony Storey
- Jayne Waddington as Janet Storey
- Haydn Conway as Mark Storey
- Jackie Shinn as Mr. Forbes
- Duggie Brown as Geoff Carter
- Bert Oxley as Phil Beatson
- Ted Beyer as Harry
- Tommy Edwards as Alf Meakin
- Anne Firth as Sheila
- Stan Richards as Albert
- Philip Firth as Ronnie
- Michael Hinchcliffe as Johnny
- Christie Gee as Mrs King
- Ron Delta as Mr Dobson
- Mary Wray as Mrs Dobson
- Hughie Turner as Bob Richards (Part One)
- Robbie Platts as Mr Atkinson (Part One)
- Vicky Dale as Edna (Part One)
- Edward Underdown as Sir Gordon Horrocks (Part One)
- Danny James as Banksman (Part One)
- Tony Graham as Painter (Part One)
- Peter Russell as Telephonist (Part One)
- Johnny Allan and Peter Martin as the Bomb Squad (Part One)
- Gary Roberts as George Kay (Part Two)
- Jean Spence as Mrs Kay (Part Two)
- Les Hickin as Eric (Part Two)
- Peter Black as Pete (Part Two)
- Paul Bryan as Mr Oates (Part Two)
- Henry Moxon as Eric Johnson, MP (Part Two)
- Olga Grahame as Salvation Army Lady (Part Two)
- Wilfred Grove as Deputy (Part Two)
- Max Smith as National Union of Mineworkers Official (Part Two)

== Production ==
Several of the cast were stand-up comedians from the Yorkshire working men's club circuit, including Duggie Brown, Bobby Knutt, Stan Richards and Jackie Shinn. The drama was filmed around the disused Thorpe Hesley colliery near Rotherham in South Yorkshire. The scenes in which the Mines Rescue Team set off were filmed in Wakefield with the real Mines Rescue Team in the area, who are given thanks in the end credits.

== Influences ==
Hines was raised in the mining community of Hoyland Common near Barnsley, and had been a coal miner when he left school. He recollected that when a neighbour saw him at the coalface and chided him "Couldn't tha find a better job than this?" he was inspired to return to full-time education and trained to be a teacher.

In The Guardian's obituary of Barry Hines, The Price of Coal was described as "a vehicle for Barry to scrutinise class politics". Hines was a republican but recognised most British people supported the monarchy, as portrayed in the film. The Guardian's obituary by Tony Garnett read, "In The Price of Coal he revealed not only his angry compassion for the daily dangers of mining, but an acknowledgment of the feudal backwardness in his community".
