= Rita May (actress) =

English actress (born 1942)

- Born: 9 May 1942 (age 84); Sheffield, West Riding of Yorkshire, England
- Occupation: Actress
- Years active: 1977–present
- Known for: Coronation Street; Children's Ward; Trollied; Ackley Bridge

Rita May (born 9 May 1942) is an English actress. She is known for her roles as Mags in the ITV children's drama Children's Ward, Margaret in the Sky One sitcom Trollied, as well as Julie "Nana" Booth in the Channel 4 drama Ackley Bridge.

== Career ==
May began her career as a singer on the working men's club circuit in and around South Yorkshire. She featured in the television adaptation of Barry Hines's The Price of Coal, a Play for Today first broadcast in 1977, and as Jimmy Kemp's mother in Hines's scripted nuclear war drama Threads in 1984.

She has also appeared in television series such as Early Doors and Drop Dead Gorgeous, and radio programmes including Ed Reardon's Week and The Blackburn Files. In 2005, she appeared in one episode of Heartbeat. In March 2009, it was announced that May would appear as Connie Rathbone, a new love interest of Jack Duckworth, in the ITV soap opera Coronation Street.

From 2011 to 2018, she appeared in the Sky One sitcom Trollied, in which she played Margaret, a supermarket assistant pharmacist. In 2017, May appeared in Channel 4 drama Ackley Bridge as Julie "Nana" Booth. Her character died in the fourth episode of the series. She later appeared in an episode of the third series of Ackley Bridge in 2019, as part of a scene with Missy Booth (Poppy Lee Friar).

== Filmography ==
Film
Year	Title	Role	Notes
1980	The Gamekeeper	Mary	
1981	Looks and Smiles	Receptionist	
1996	When Saturday Comes	Mabel	
1999	Fanny and Elvis	Rick's Mother	Minor role
2009	In the Loop	Mrs. Michaelson	
2014	Martha	Old Lady	
2018	Walk Like a Panther	Mabel Higgens	
2020	Fargate	Ethel Badger	Short film
2020	Everybody's Talking About Jamie	Mrs. Cardwell	

Television
Year	Title	Role	Notes
1977	Play for Today	Kath Storey	2 episodes
1978	Fallen Hero	Molly	1 episode
1978	Coronation Street	Marjorie Pitts	2 episodes
1979	Crown Court	Zoe Grimshaw	1 episode
1981	Coronation Street	Freda	1 episode
1982	Play for Today	Pat	1 episode
1983	The Gathering Seed	Martha Kilbride	5 episodes
1984	Juliet Bravo	Audrey Mason	1 episode
1984	Threads	Mrs. Kemp	Television film
1984	Mitch	Enid	1 episode
1985	Edge of Darkness	Tea Lady	Mini series
1988	Wish Me Luck	Marguerite	1 episode
1989–2000	Children's Ward	Mags	Main role
1991	The Bill	Doreen Noakes	Minor role
1994	Heartbeat	Junk Shop Owner	Minor role
1996	Hetty Wainthropp Investigates	Supermarket Shopper	Cameo role
1998	The Cops	Pauline's Neighbour	Cameo role
1998	Sharpe's Justice	Mrs. Trent	Television film
1998	Casualty	Marion Copes	1 episode
1999	My Wonderful Life	Mrs. Newell	1 episode
2000	City Central	Betty Sharples	1 episode
2000	Fat Friends	Joan Kirk	Recurring role
2000	Coronation Street	Mrs. Wilberforce	1 episode
2001	In Deep	Joan Jameson	2 episodes
2001	Clocking Off	Brenda Sleight	1 episode
2001	Coronation Street	Brenda Kelly	1 episode
2001	Doctors	Eileen Neville	1 episode
2002	Blood Strangers	Pat Beresford	Television film
2003	The Royal	Aunt Mary Graham	Minor role
2003	Last of the Summer Wine	Celia	Minor role
2003–2004	Early Doors	Jean	Main role
2004	Holby City	Queenie Taylor	1 episode
2004	The Bill	School Secretary	Minor role
2004	Doctors	Sadie O'Malley	1 episode
2005	No Angels	Mrs. Clemence	Minor role
2005	Bodies	Judith Bailey	1 episode
2005, 2007	Heartbeat	Mrs. Sneddon	2 episodes
2006	The Street	Margie's Friend	Cameo role
2006	Casualty	Eileen Slater	1 episode
2006–2007	Drop Dead Gorgeous	Nana Howard	Recurring role
2008	Trexx and Flipside	Edna	1 episode
2008	Sunshine	Doreen	Minor role
2008	Doctors	Maggie Wilson	1 episode
2009–2010	Coronation Street	Connie Rathbone	Recurring role
2009	Red Riding: In the Year of Our Lord 1974	Aunty Win	Television film
2009	This Morning	Herself	Guest
2010	Casualty	Eileen Thompson	1 episode
2010	Doctors	Phyllis March	1 episode
2011–2018	Trollied	Margaret	Main role; 68 episodes
2011	Doctors	Mary Roberts	1 episode
2012	The Argument	Maureen	Television film
2014	Remember Me	Mavis	Minor role
2017, 2019	Ackley Bridge	Julie "Nana" Booth	Recurring role; 5 episodes
2018	Casualty	Matilda Dunford	1 episode
2019	Shakespeare & Hathaway: Private Investigators	Emelia Merchent	1 episode
2020	Tea for Three	Gran	1 episode
2020	Baby Zoomers	Valerie	1 episode
