= The Gamekeeper =

The Gamekeeper can refer to:

- The Gamekeeper (film), a 1980 British film directed by Ken Loach
- "The Gamekeeper", an episode of Stargate SG-1
