= Lowe Stand =

Folly in Hoyland, South Yorkshire, England

Coordinates: 53°30′15″N 1°27′14″W

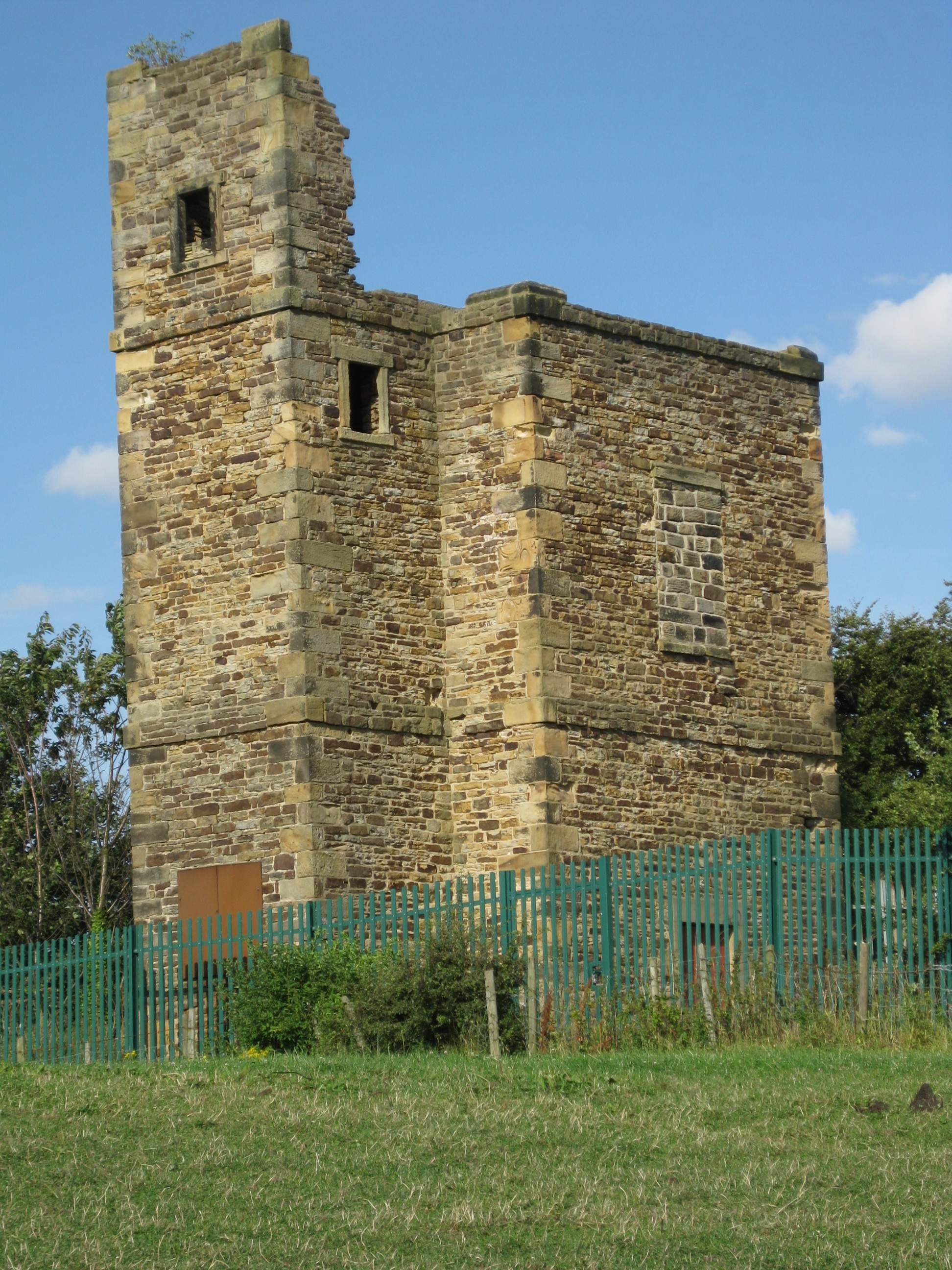
Hoyland Lowe Stand

Lowe Stand is an 18th-century folly built for Thomas Watson-Wentworth, 1st Marquess of Rockingham, and likely originally intended as a hunting lodge. It is situated in the South Yorkshire town of Hoyland, 5 miles (8 km) south-east of Barnsley. Today the stand is a Grade II listed building but is in a fairly advanced state of decay. In 2008 the deeds were handed over from the council to voluntary group, the Friends of Hoyland Lowe Stand (now the Lowe Stand Trust). The council has given permission to restore it according to the plan produced.
