= Chris Menges =

British cinematographer and film director (b. 1940)

- Born: 15 September 1940 (age 86); Kington, Herefordshire, England
- Occupations: Cinematographer, film director
- Years active: 1959–2019
- Father: Herbert Menges
- Relatives: Isolde Menges (aunt)

Christopher J. Menges BSC, ASC (born 15 September 1940) is an English cinematographer and film director.

He has won the Academy Award for Best Cinematography for The Killing Fields (1984) and for The Mission (1986).

== Early life ==
Menges was born in Kington, Herefordshire in 1940, the son of the composer and conductor Herbert Menges. His paternal grandfather, George, was a German emigrant to the United Kingdom. He was introduced to filmmaking as a teenager by his neighbour, documentarian Alan Forbes, and worked as his assistant for several years.

Menges cites Roberto Rossellini, Italian neorealism, Free Cinema, and the Czechoslovak New Wave as influences.

== Career ==
Menges began his career in the 1960s as camera operator for documentaries by Adrian Cowell. From 1961 to 1962, he worked for CBC Television's documentary division under Allan King. In 1963, he joined ITV Granada's news programme World in Action, where he was a cameraman for conflict reporting, including the Vietnam War, the Turkish invasion of Cyprus, the Angolan War of Independence, the Algerian War, and the Zanzibar Revolution.

Back in Britain, Menges was a camera operator for feature films including Poor Cow and If..... Kes was his first film as cinematographer. Menges was also behind the camera on Stephen Frears's first feature film Gumshoe in 1971.

Menges also worked in the Star Wars entry The Empire Strikes Back, in 2nd unit photography

In 1983, Menges received his first BAFTA nomination for the film Local Hero, and only a year later won his first Academy Award for the film The Killing Fields about the genocide in Cambodia. He continued his work with helmer Roland Joffe, and Menges won his second Oscar in 1986 with the historical drama The Mission. He also shot a television play titled Made in Britain, in 1983.

In 1988, Menges made his directorial debut with A World Apart, a biopic based on the life of South African anti-apartheid activist Ruth First and Joe Slovo. This film was celebrated at the 1988 Cannes Film Festival and won three major awards.

His second film as director, CrissCross, received critical acclaim, but was a box-office flop. In 1996 he moved back behind the camera to shoot the award-winning films The Boxer and Michael Collins. For the latter, he received his third Academy Award nomination in 1997.

Menges also made documentaries. In the early 1970s, he went to Burma with British film maker Adrian Cowell to shoot The Opium Warlords, a film about the drug trade. After the release of the documentary in 1974, the Burmese government was said to have put a price on their heads. Menges is mentioned in the book Conversations with Cinematographers by David A. Ellis, published by Scarecrow Press.

Cinematographer Barry Ackroyd credits Menges as an influence.

== Filmography ==
=== Cinematographer ===
Short film

Year	Title	Director	Notes
1963	The War Game	Mai Zetterling	With Brian Probyn
1968	Solo	Misha Donat	
1981	Couples and Robbers	Clare Peploe	

Feature film

Year	Title	Director	Notes
1968	Last of the Long-haired Boys	Peter Everett	Uncredited
1969	Kes	Ken Loach	
1970	Loving Memory	Tony Scott	With Scott and John Metcalfe
1971	Black Beauty	James Hill	
1971	Gumshoe	Stephen Frears	
1979	Black Jack	Ken Loach	
1980	Babylon	Franco Rosso	
1980	The Gamekeeper	Ken Loach	With Charles Stewart
1981	A Sense of Freedom	John Mackenzie	
1981	Looks and Smiles	Ken Loach	
1982	Battletruck	Harley Cokeliss	
1982	Angel	Neil Jordan	
1983	Local Hero	Bill Forsyth	
1984	Comfort and Joy	Bill Forsyth	
1984	The Killing Fields	Roland Joffé	
1984	Winter Flight	Roy Battersby	
1985	Marie	Roger Donaldson	
1986	The Mission	Roland Joffé	
1986	Fatherland	Ken Loach	
1987	Shy People	Andrei Konchalovsky	
1987	High Season	Clare Peploe	
1996	Michael Collins	Neil Jordan	
1997	The Boxer	Jim Sheridan	
2001	The Pledge	Sean Penn	
2002	Dirty Pretty Things	Stephen Frears	
2002	The Good Thief	Neil Jordan	
2004	Criminal	Gregory Jacobs	
2005	Tickets	Ken Loach	
2005	The Three Burials of Melquiades Estrada	Tommy Lee Jones	
2005	North Country	Niki Caro	
2006	Notes on a Scandal	Richard Eyre	
2008	The Yellow Handkerchief	Udayan Prasad	
2008	Stop-Loss	Kimberly Peirce	
2008	The Reader	Stephen Daldry	With Roger Deakins
2010	Route Irish	Ken Loach	
2010	London Boulevard	William Monahan	
2011	Extremely Loud & Incredibly Close	Stephen Daldry	
2013	Hummingbird	Steven Knight	
2019	Waiting for the Barbarians	Ciro Guerra	

Documentary works

Year	Title	Director	Notes
1966	Raid into Tibet	Adrian Cowell	Documentary short
1968	Abel Gance: The Charm of Dynamite	Kevin Brownlow	
1969	Wild and Free Twice Daily	Himself	
1969	Assignment Vietnam	Richard Taylor	Documentary short
1971	Talk About Work	Ken Loach	Documentary short
1971	The Save the Children Fund Film	Ken Loach	
1981	East 103rd Street	Himself	
1984	Which Side Are You On?	Ken Loach	With Jimmy Dibling
1987	Warlords of the Golden Triangle	Adrian Cowell; Wai-Chuen Yung	
2003	Concert for George	David Leland	
2019	Voice of Land	Henrique Bouduard	

=== Director ===
Documentary film

- Wild and Free Twice Daily (1969)
- East 103rd Street (1981) (Also producer)

Feature film

- A World Apart (1988)
- CrissCross (1992)
- Second Best (1993)
- The Lost Son (1999)

== Awards and nominations ==
Institution	Year	Category	Title	Result	Ref.
Academy Awards	1985	Best Cinematography	The Killing Fields	Won	
Academy Awards	1987	Best Cinematography	The Mission	Won	
Academy Awards	1997	Best Cinematography	Michael Collins	Nominated	
Academy Awards	2009	Best Cinematography	The Reader	Nominated	
British Academy Film Awards	1984	Best Cinematography	Local Hero	Nominated	
British Academy Film Awards	1985	Best Cinematography	The Killing Fields	Won	
British Academy Film Awards	1987	Best Cinematography	The Mission	Nominated	
British Academy Film Awards	1997	Best Cinematography	Michael Collins	Nominated	
British Academy Film Awards	2009	Best Cinematography	The Reader	Nominated	
British Academy Television Craft Awards	1978	Best Film Cameraman	Playhouse ("Last Summer")	Won	
American Society of Cinematographers	1987	Outstanding Achievement in Cinematography	The Mission	Nominated	
American Society of Cinematographers	1997	Outstanding Achievement in Cinematography	Michael Collins	Nominated	
American Society of Cinematographers	1998	Outstanding Achievement in Cinematography	The Boxer	Nominated	
American Society of Cinematographers	2009	Outstanding Achievement in Cinematography	The Reader	Nominated	
American Society of Cinematographers	2010	International Award	—N/a	Won	
British Society of Cinematographers	1984	Best Cinematography	The Killing Fields	Won	
British Society of Cinematographers	1986	Best Cinematography	The Mission	Nominated	
British Society of Cinematographers	1996	Best Cinematography	Michael Collins	Nominated	
British Society of Cinematographers	2002	Best Cinematography	Dirty Pretty Things	Nominated	
British Society of Cinematographers	2009	Best Cinematography	The Reader	Nominated	
British Society of Cinematographers	2011	Lifetime Achievement Award	—N/a	Won	
British Independent Film Awards	2001	Lifetime Achievement Award	—N/a	Won	
Camerimage Festival	2005	Golden Frog	The Three Burials of Melquiades Estrada	Nominated	
Camerimage Festival	2015	Lifetime Achievement Award	—N/a	Won	
Cannes Film Festival	1988	Palme d'Or	A World Apart	Nominated	
Cannes Film Festival	1988	Grand Prix	A World Apart	Won	
Cannes Film Festival	1988	Prize of the Ecumenical Jury	A World Apart	Won	
Chicago Film Critics Association	1997	Best Cinematography	Michael Collins	Nominated	
Chicago International Film Festival	1981	Best Documentary	East 103rd Street	Nominated	
European Film Awards	2002	Best Cinematographer	Dirty Pretty Things	Nominated	
Evening Standard British Film Awards	1984	Best Technical/Artistic Achievement	—N/a	Won	
Independent Spirit Awards	1989	Best International Film	A World Apart	Nominated	
Independent Spirit Awards	2006	Best Cinematography	The Three Burials of Melquiades Estrada	Won	
Los Angeles Film Critics Association	1984	Best Cinematography	The Killing Fields	Won	
Los Angeles Film Critics Association	1986	Best Cinematography	The Mission	Won	
Los Angeles Film Critics Association	1996	Best Cinematography	Michael Collins	Won	
National Society of Film Critics	1984	Best Cinematography	Comfort and Joy	Won	
National Society of Film Critics	1984	Best Cinematography	The Killing Fields	Won	
National Society of Film Critics	1989	Best Director	A World Apart	Nominated	
National Society of Film Critics	1996	Best Cinematography	Michael Collins	Nominated	
New York Film Critics Circle	1984	Best Cinematography	The Killing Fields	Won	
New York Film Critics Circle	1986	Best Cinematography	The Mission	Nominated	
New York Film Critics Circle	1989	Best Director	A World Apart	Won	
Raindance Film Festival	2001	Lifetime Achievement Award	—N/a	Won	
San Sebastián International Film Festival	1994	Golden Shell	Second Best	Nominated	
San Sebastián International Film Festival	1994	Special Jury Prize	Second Best	Won	
