= Scott Sommer =

American novelist

Scott Sommer (February 20, 1951 – November 18, 1993) was an American author. He graduated from Columbia High School (1969) and Ohio Wesleyan University (1973). Sommer was the author of four novels and one collection of short stories.

He was the screenwriter of the film CrissCross starring Goldie Hawn. His novel Nearing's Grace was made into the 2005 feature film Nearing Grace. He appeared as an extra in Crossing Delancey and Knots Landing.

The Writer's Voice offered the "Scott Sommer Fiction Award" annually until 1999. The winner received $1,000 and a special reading.

== Books published ==
- 1979 - Nearing's Grace
- 1981 - Lifetime (short stories)
- 1982 - Last Resort
- 1985 - Hazzard's Head
- 1989 - Still Lives
