= CrissCross =

1992 American film by Chris Menges

- Theatrical release poster
- Directed by: Chris Menges
- Screenplay by: Scott Sommer
- Based on: CrissCross; 1981 novella by Scott Sommer
- Produced by: Anthea Sylbert
- Starring: Goldie Hawn; Arliss Howard; James Gammon; Keith Carradine
- Cinematography: Ivan Strasburg
- Edited by: Tony Lawson
- Music by: Trevor Jones
- Distributed by: Metro-Goldwyn-Mayer; United Artists
- Release date: May 8, 1992
- Running time: 100 minutes
- Country: United States
- Language: English
- Budget: $14 million
- Box office: $3,052,738 (USA)

CrissCross is a 1992 American drama film directed by Chris Menges and written by Scott Sommer, based on his eponymous novel. It stars Goldie Hawn, Arliss Howard, Keith Carradine, Steve Buscemi, and David Arnott.

== Plot ==
Divorced mom Tracy Cross raises her 12-year-old son, Christopher, in Key West in 1969 around the time of the Apollo 11 Moon landing. Chris narrates the film in voice-over and talks about his "screwed up" life living with his mother in a cheap hotel. Chris's father was an Annapolis-trained fighter pilot who had served in Vietnam. However, he became seriously disturbed after bombing a civilian hospital and burned his uniform as a "killer's costume". Falling into alcoholism, he deserts Chris and Tracy, moving into a hippie commune to separate himself from society. Chris hasn't seen his father in three years but still loves him deeply.

Chris delivers papers and fish to help support his mother who works as a bartender and waitress. He unwittingly discovers that there are drugs hidden in the fish he is delivering and becomes a small-time drug dealer out of desperation when he finds his mother has resorted to working as a stripper to support them. (One evening, without her knowledge, Chris goes to the restaurant where she is working. He peeks inside from the doorway, and is upset to see her doing pole dancing in a thong costume.) She is ashamed when he confronts her with this, but she tells him that sometimes in life one has to do what is not good to get what is. Chris visits his father in the commune and attempts to get him to reconcile with Tracy but to no avail.

A stranger, Joe, comes to town and strikes up a relationship with Tracy. This further disturbs her son. Joe turns out to be a law-enforcement undercover agent, working to bring down the drug ring. His relationship with Tracy and her son complicates matters as the time comes to make the arrest. Chris narrowly escapes being killed when he delivers the drugs and it degenerates into a shootout. In the end, he spends the night in jail and is put on probation learning a valuable lesson. He and Tracy move into a mobile home park and she retires from stripping.

The Apollo Moon landing is mentioned throughout the film as a sort of metaphor and Chris mentions in the end how happy the astronauts must have been to have returned to the Earth no matter how screwed up it is.

== Cast ==
- Goldie Hawn as Tracy Cross
- David Arnott as Chris Cross
- Arliss Howard as Joe
- Keith Carradine as John Cross
- James Gammon as Emmitt
- J.C. Quinn as Jetty
- Steve Buscemi as Louis
- Paul Calderon as Bucky
- Cathryn de Prume as Oakley
- Nada Despotovich as Kelly
- David Anthony Marshall as Blondie
- Deirdre O'Connell as Shelly
- Neil Giuntoli as Snyder
- Annie McEnroe as Mrs. Sivil

== Location ==
Some scenes were shot in the Miami/Key West surrounding areas. The Spanish monastery in the film is in North Miami and was brought to Miami from Spain in thousands of numbered individual stone blocks and re-built stone by stone.
