= Looks and Smiles =

- Theatrical release poster
- Directed by: Ken Loach
- Written by: Barry Hines
- Produced by: Raymond Day; Irving Teitelbaum
- Starring: Graham Green; Carolyn Nicholson
- Cinematography: Chris Menges
- Edited by: Stephen Singleton
- Music by: Marc Wilkinson
- Production companies: Black Lion Films; Kestrel Films
- Distributed by: ITC Entertainment
- Release date: 12 September 1981
- Running time: 104 minutes
- Country: United Kingdom
- Language: English

Looks and Smiles is a 1981 British drama film directed by Ken Loach and starring Graham Green and Carolyn Nicholsom. It was written by Barry Hines based on his 1981 novel of the same name.

In an interview for the book Loach on Loach, the director said that the title of the film is taken from a line from Anton Chekhov: "How did girls attract boys when they were young? In the usual way – with looks and smiles."

== Plot ==
A disadvantaged young man tries to get by in Margaret Thatcher's England.

== Cast ==
- Graham Green as Michael 'Mick' Walsh
- Carolyn Nicholson as Karen Lodge
- Tony Pitts as Alan Wright
- Roy Haywood as Phil
- Phil Askham as Mr. Walsh
- Pam Darrell as Mrs. Walsh
- Tracey Goodlad as Julie
- Patti Nicholls as Mrs. Wright
- Cilla Mason as Mrs. Lodge
- Les Hickin as George
- Arthur Davies as Eric Lodge
- Deirdre Costello as Jenny (as Deidre Costello)
- Jackie Shinn as gatekeeper
- Christine Francis as careers officer
- Rita May as receptionist

== Production ==
The film was shot in black-and-white entirely on location in Sheffield.

== Reception ==
In The New York Times, Vincent Canby wrote: "There's not an inadequate or ill-conceived performance in the film. ... There is one problem: Mr. Loach, as usual, makes no effort to clean up the regional accents of his actors, the result being that a great deal of the dialogue remains unintelligible to the American ear."

Simon Hattenstone wrote in The Guardian: "Even the most devoted fan found 1981’s Looks & Smiles painfully miserable".

Writing in his book The Cinema of Ken Loach, Jacob Leigh comments: "Looks and Smiles reveals the depression people felt in the industrial North of England in the 1980s; but it is as depressing as Mick's life. ... Loach's characteristic attention to detail renders the film a period piece."

== Accolades ==
The film was entered into the 1981 Cannes Film Festival, where Loach won the Young Cinema Award.

== Aftermath ==
When asked why he was unhappy with the film in an interview for Loach on Loach, Ken Loach said, "It's too lethargic and gently-paced and when I think about it now I want to give it a kick up the arse."

Loach considered the film a failure and turned to making documentaries for several years afterwards, saying that the film failed to "create the outrage in the audience that should have been there". He also considered it "the end of an era" as he avoided long camera shots in subsequent films. In support of the film, it has been held up as one of Ken Loach's film that does not propagate one political view heavily, as opposed to Fatherland or Land and Freedom
