= Hoyland Town Hall =

Municipal building in Hoyland, South Yorkshire, England

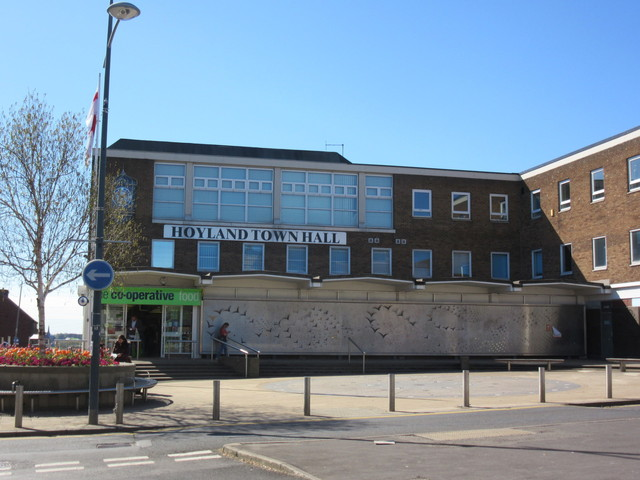
- The building in 2015, before conversion into apartments

- Shown in South Yorkshire
- 53.5004°N 1.4381°W
- Location: High Street, Hoyland

History
- Built: 1973

Site notes
- Architectural style: Modern style

Hoyland Town Hall is a former municipal building in Hoyland, a town in South Yorkshire in England. The town hall, which was previously the offices and meeting place of Hoyland Urban District Council, is currently in residential use.

== History ==
The first town hall in Hoyland Nether was a small building designed in the neoclassical style, built in red brick and completed in 1840. The design involved a symmetrical main frontage of five bays facing onto the High Street. The central bay, which was projected forward, featured a square headed doorway with a cornice on the ground floor, a tripartite window on the first floor, and a shallow pyramid-shaped roof. The outer bays were fenestrated by sash windows on both floors.

A local grocery owner, Martha Knowles, donated a three stage-tower, with a clock in the second stage, louvres in the third stage, and an ogee-shaped roof, which was installed above and behind the central bay in 1892. After Hoyland Nether became an urban district in 1894, the new council adopted the town hall as its offices and meeting place. Following heavy allied losses at the Battle of Tannenberg in August 1914 at the start of the First World War, the council convened a committee in the town hall to raise funds for people in distress as a result of the war.

After the first town hall became dilapidated, the council decided to demolish it and replace it with a more up-to-date three-storey structure. The new building was designed in the modern style, built in red brick and was opened on 11 July 1973. The new building faced onto the south and west sides of the market square. The council occupied the upper floors, which were fenestrated by small square casement windows, while the ground floor served as a supermarket.

The new town hall ceased to be local seat of government after the enlarged Barnsley Metropolitan Borough Council was formed in 1974. The enlarged council continued to use the new town hall for the provision of local services, but by the early 21st century, the offices had been mothballed. In 2004, a covert listening device was found when a clock fell off a wall, the origin of which could not be established.

The Co-op Food supermarket on the ground floor closed in 2019. A developer submitted a planning application which proposed converting the building into 27 apartments, but this was rejected on the grounds that some would be unacceptably small or lack sufficient light. Instead, in 2022, the building was re-purchased by the borough council, and it was later converted into 21 apartments.
