= Nearing Grace =

- Theatrical release poster
- Directed by: Rick Rosenthal
- Screenplay by: Jacob Aaron Estes
- Based on: Nearing Grace by Scott Sommer
- Produced by: Susan Johnson
- Starring: Gregory Smith; David Morse; Jordana Brewster
- Cinematography: David Geddes
- Edited by: Madeleine Gavin
- Music by: John Nordstrom
- Distributed by: Whitewater Films
- Release dates: June 18, 2005 (Los Angeles Film Festival); October 13, 2006 (United States)
- Running time: 105 minutes
- Language: English

Nearing Grace is a 2005 teen drama film directed by Rick Rosenthal, based on the novel by Scott Sommer.

== Plot ==
High school senior Henry Nearing (Gregory Smith) has to cope with the death of his mother and is also forced to come to terms with evolving from a self-absorbed and confused adolescent to accepting the responsibilities of early adulthood. Unfortunately his father, Shep (David Morse), and his older brother, Blair (David Moscow), don't offer guidance and find themselves detaching at the seams. His father quits his teaching job, buys a motorcycle, and becomes a perpetual drunk, while his brother takes off to live as a transient doper. To make things even more complicated, Henry has two young women on his mind: the sexy, wealthy, very popular Grace (Jordana Brewster) and childhood friend Merna (Ashley Johnson)—one girl drives him crazy, and the other girl keeps him sane.

== Cast ==
- Gregory Smith as Henry
- David Morse as Shep
- David Moscow as Blair
- Jordana Brewster as Grace
- Ashley Johnson as Merna

== Critical reception ==
On the review aggregator website Rotten Tomatoes, 48% of 21 critics' reviews are positive, with an average rating of 5.3/10. The website's consensus reads: "This coming-of-age story doesn't dig deep enough to offer anything fresh to the genre." Metacritic, which uses a weighted average, assigned the film a score of 62 out of 100, based on 11 critics, indicating "generally favorable" reviews. Writing for the Los Angeles Times, Michael Ordoña's review was mixed but ultimately positive, concluding that despite a sometimes lackluster lead performance, the strong supporting cast and clever dialogue allowed the film's strengths to "outweigh its flaws."

== Soundtrack ==
1. "Concerto for Violin and Orchestra in D Major op 35" Canzonetta Andante Tchaikovsky
2. "Sleepwalker" Written and performed by The Kinks
3. "Love Is Like Oxygen" Written by Andrew David Scott Performed by Sweet
4. "Teenage Kicks" Written by John O’Neill Performed by The Undertones
5. "If You See Her, Say Hello" Written by Bob Dylan Performed by Bob Dylan
6. "All By Myself" Written by Eric Carmen and Sergei Rachmaninoff Performed by Ashley Johnson
7. "Got to Give It Up" Written by Marvin Gaye Performed by Marvin Gaye
8. "Time Has Told Me" Written by Nick Drake Performed by Nick Drake
9. "Slow Motions" Written by Nevin Gamble and Leon Huff Performed by Johnny Williams
10. "Crimson and Clover" Written by Tommy James and Peter Lucia Performed by Tommy James and the Shondells
11. "I’ll Be Your Mirror" Written by Lou Reed Performed by The Velvet Underground
12. Music from The Incredible Hulk
13. "(Don't Fear) The Reaper" Written by Donald Roeser Performed by Blue Öyster Cult
14. "I Wanna Be Your Boyfriend" Written by Douglas Colvin, Thomas Erdelyi, Jeff Hyman and John Cummings Performed by The Ramones
15. "Time Has Come Today" Written by Joseph Chamber and Willie Chambers Performed by The Chambers Brothers
16. "Uh-Oh Love Comes to Town" Written by David Byrne Performed by Talking Heads
17. "Juke Box Music" Written by Ray Davies Performed by The Kinks
18. "Let’s Go" Written by Richard Orasek Performed by Band of Warhols
19. "Bang a Gong (Get It On)" Written by Marc Bolan Performed by Marc Bolan
20. "Air That I Breathe" Written by Albert Hammond and Michael Hardwood Performed by Band of Warhols
21. "Heart of Glass" Written by Debbie Harry and Chris Stein Performed by Band of Warhols
22. "Pomp and Circumstance" Written by Sir Edward Edgar Performed by Parkrose High School Band
23. "The Walk" Performed by Imogen Heap
