= Barry Hines =

British writer (1939–2016)

- Born: Melvin Barry Hines; 30 June 1939; Hoyland, England
- Died: 18 March 2016 (aged 76); Hoyland, England
- Education: Ecclesfield Grammar School
- Occupation: Writer
- Years active: 1966–2009

Melvin Barry Hines, FRSL (30 June 1939 – 18 March 2016) was an English author, playwright and screenwriter. His novels and screenplays explore the political and economic struggles of working-class Northern England, particularly in his native West Riding/South Yorkshire.

He is best known for the novel A Kestrel for a Knave (1968), which he helped adapt for Ken Loach's film Kes (1969). He collaborated with Loach on adaptations of his novels Looks and Smiles and The Gamekeeper, and the 1977 two-part television drama The Price of Coal.

He also wrote the television film Threads, which depicts the impact of a nuclear war on Sheffield.

== Early life ==
Hines was born in the mining village of Hoyland Common near Barnsley, West Riding of Yorkshire. He attended Ecclesfield Grammar School after passing the eleven-plus in 1950 and played football for the England Grammar Schools team. After leaving school with five O levels he took a job with the National Coal Board as an apprentice mining surveyor at Rockingham Colliery. A neighbour he chanced to meet at the coal face disapproved of his failure to meet his potential; Hines later said that was when he decided to return to school to take four A-levels.

After his A levels, he studied for a teaching qualification at Loughborough College. For his dissertation, Hines wrote a piece of creative fiction entitled "Flight of the Hawk", which later inspired his debut novel The Blinder. He worked as a Physical Education teacher for several years, initially for two years in a London comprehensive school and subsequently at Longcar Central School in Barnsley, where he wrote novels in the school library after the children had gone home. He later became a full-time writer.

Hines was a keen amateur footballer who played for Barnsley's reserves and was invited to a trial at Manchester United. He later played for Loughborough College, Crawley Town and Stocksbridge Works. He also represented England Schoolboys.

== Career ==
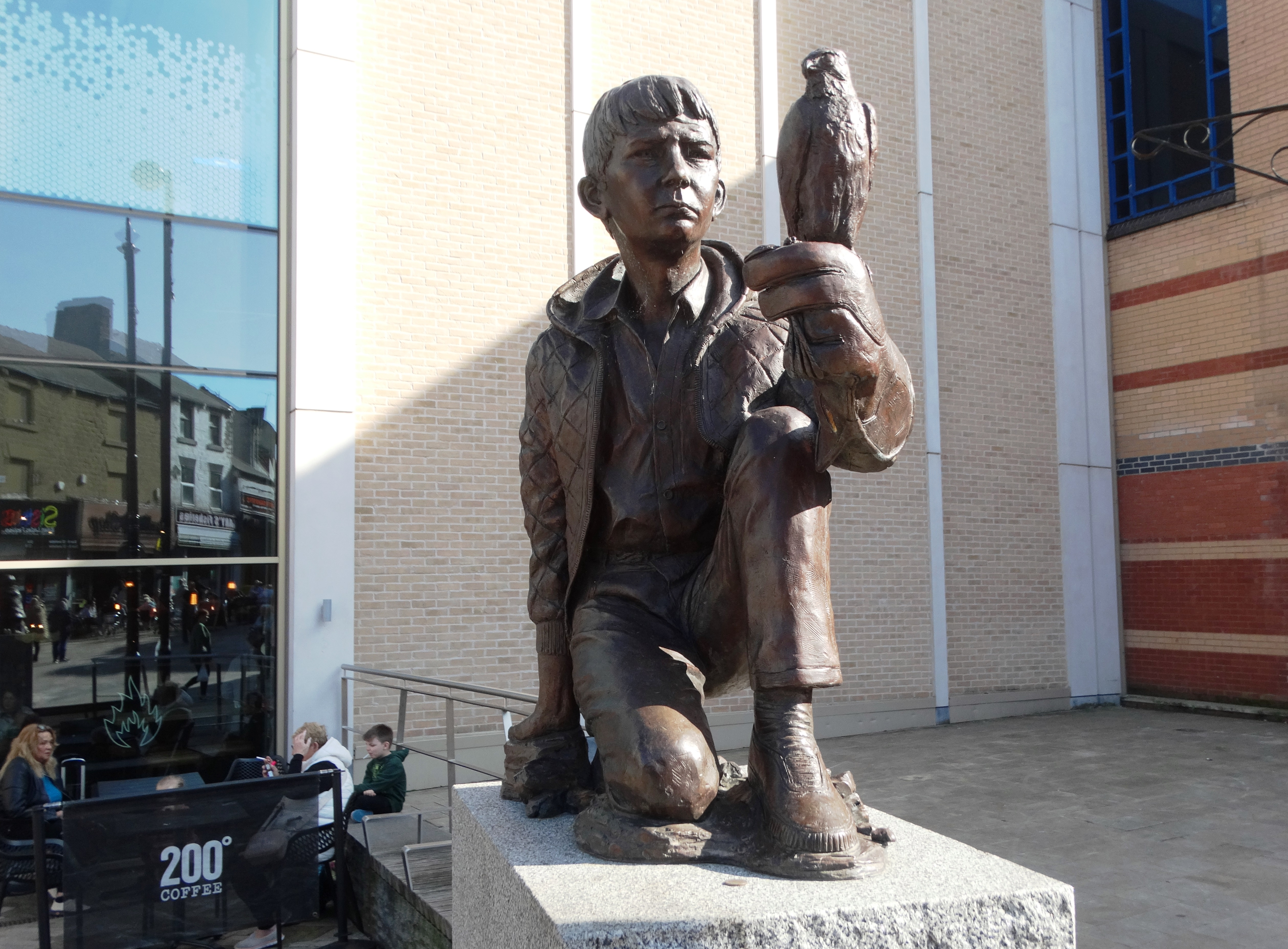
The Barry Hines Memorial, also known as the Kes Statue, located in the town centre of Barnsley depicts A Kestrel for a Knave characters Billy Casper and Kes.

=== Early work and A Kestrel for a Knave (1965–1970) ===
Hines' first published work was the play Billy's Last Stand, written while he worked as a PE teacher alongside his debut novel, The Blinder. A duologue between an impoverished coal miner and his manipulative business partner, it first appeared on BBC Radio Third Programme in 1965, with Arthur Lowe and Ronald Baddiley.

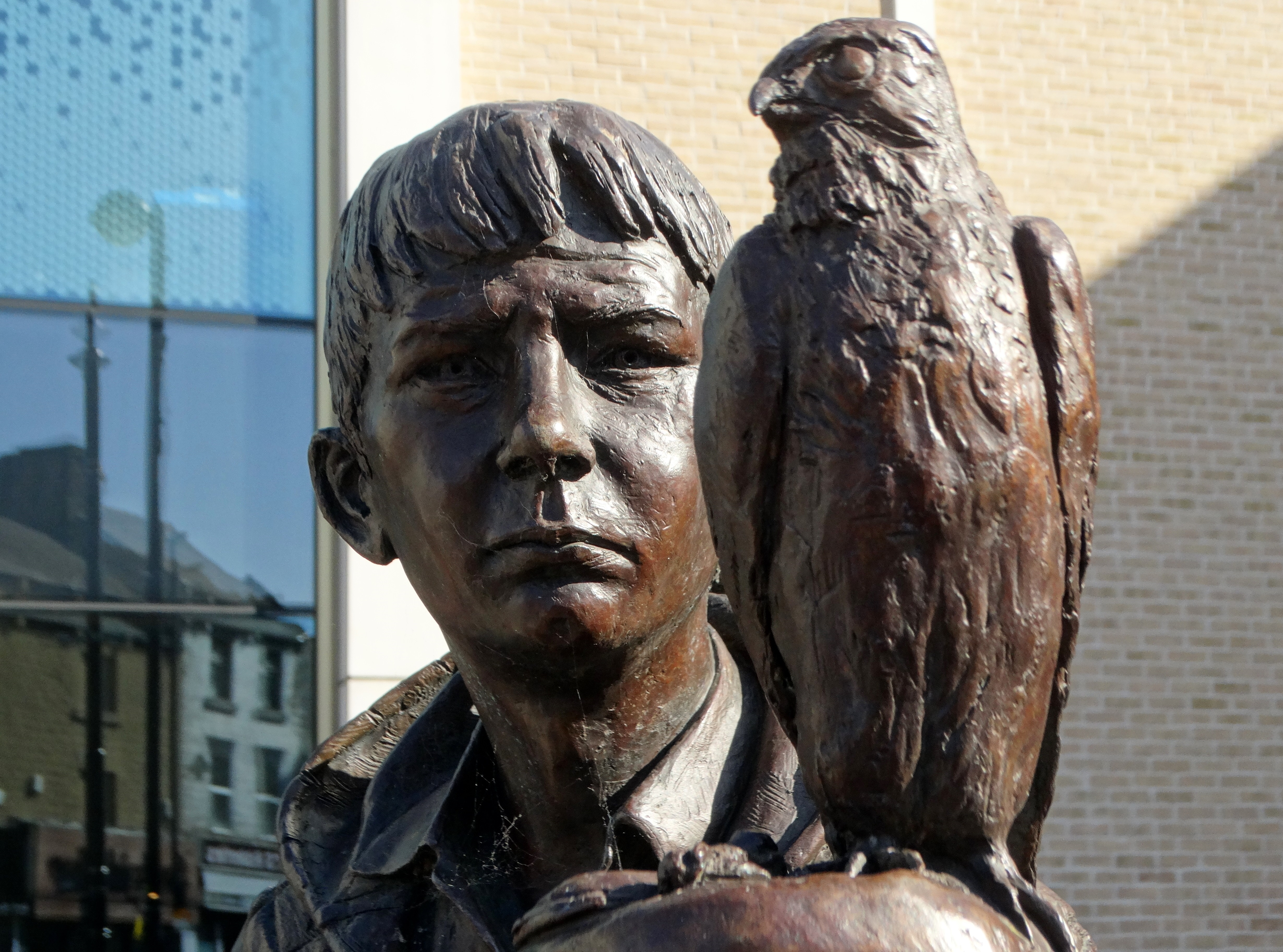
An up-close photograph of the Barry Hines Memorial.

The broadcast of Billy's Last Stand found Hines a publisher for The Blinder, which was published in 1966. It follows a gifted teenage footballer torn between his sporting career and his academic aspirations. The novel was partly based on Hines' own experiences playing youth football, as he had played for Barnsley FC's youth team and was offered trials at Manchester United.

The Blinder caught the attention of film and television producer Tony Garnett. He approached Hines about the possibility of writing a Wednesday Play for the BBC, but Hines told him he had "got this book going round my head and I need to write it". He received a bursary from the BBC to take a sabbatical from his teaching work to write the novel on a retreat on the island of Elba. Garnett and Ken Loach, who had worked together on the Wednesday Plays Up the Junction and Cathy Come Home, read the manuscript to the unpublished novel and purchased the rights for their new production company Kestrel Films in July 1967.

A Kestrel for a Knave was published in 1968. It tells the story of Billy Casper who was a troubled and neglected schoolboy living in a mining village who finds comfort in tending a kestrel that he names 'Kes'. Hines was inspired by the experiences of his brother Richard, who tamed a hawk of the same name in his youth. He co-wrote the script for the film version Kes (1969) with Loach and Garnett. Disney later offered to buy the rights on the condition that the downbeat ending, in which Billy's brother Jud kills the kestrel, be changed; Hines refused. The film was shot on location around Hines' native Barnsley and Hoyland Common. Released in November 1969, it became a critical and commercial success and has subsequently become regarded as one of the greatest British films ever made.

=== Further collaborations with Loach (1971–1981) ===
Hines continued writing novels, plays and television scripts throughout the 1970s, with much of his output centring on the tensions of labour and industry that characterised British society at the time. He adapted Billy's Last Stand for the theatre in 1971, with the titular character played by Ian McKellen, and published First Signs, a novel following a young expatriate in Italy returning to his northern hometown, in 1972. He contributed four scripts for the BBC's Play for Today strand; the first being "Billy's Last Stand" in 1971.

In 1975, Hines wrote The Gamekeeper, a novel about a former steelworker who becomes a gamekeeper on a ducal estate, which he adapted to film with Loach in 1980. In 1976 Hines wrote a script for the BBC's 'Centre Play' anthology series titled "Two Men from Derby". Further collaborations with Loach in this period included the 1977 two-part television drama, The Price of Coal, again for Play for Today. The first part, "Meet the People", follows a royal visit to a colliery while the second part, "Back to Reality", follows an accident that claims the lives of several pit workers.

The fourth and final collaboration with Loach was Looks and Smiles, published as a novel in 1980 and adapted as film in 1981. Following the daily life of an unemployed 17-year-old in Sheffield, it began as a screenplay about teenage relationships, before the issue of unemployment became central to the narrative. It competed at the Cannes Film Festival, winning the Young Cinema Award. In these projects, Hines' involvement in the filmmaking process exceeded the typical expectations of a screenwriter; he was involved in casting decisions alongside Loach, attended shoots and participated in the editing process.

=== Threads and late career (1984–2009) ===
In 1984, Hines wrote the script for the BAFTA award-winning TV film Threads (1984), a speculative television drama examining the effects of nuclear war on Sheffield. The BBC had commissioned the drama and hired Mick Jackson to direct after he produced the Q.E.D. documentary A Guide to Armageddon in 1982. Jackson hired Hines to write the screenplay because he wanted a social realist tone. Hines focused the narrative on a young couple in Sheffield dealing with an unexpected pregnancy as the threat of nuclear exchange escalates. Although Sheffield was chosen due to its proximity to RAF bases and geographical centrality, it also continued Hines' tradition of setting his work in and around South Yorkshire.

In contrast to the harmonious collaboration with Loach, Hines had a strained relationship with Jackson; according to his wife Eleanor, he disliked Jackson due to his class background while Jackson was frustrated by the amount of time Hines spent on set. However, the film was a critical success, winning a BAFTA award for Best Television Drama. Hines received a personal letter of praise from Labour leader Neil Kinnock, and Jackson said that the film was viewed by President Ronald Reagan when it was broadcast on American television the following year.

After Threads, Hines' output became more sporadic. In the early 1990s, he wrote two television plays about football; Shooting Stars, about three friends who hold a local star striker to ransom, was broadcast on Channel 4 in 1990, and Born Kicking, about the first professional female footballer, was broadcast on BBC1 in 1992. His penultimate novel, The Heart of It, was published in 1994 and returned to the subject of coal mining, depicting a Hollywood screenwriter returning home to visit his father, a communist former miner and veteran of the 1984–85 miners strike. In 2003, Loach was in contact with Hines about adapting the novel for film, but Hines refused because he felt "the ideas had gone stale".

His final novel was Elvis Over England, published in 2000 to mixed reviews; it follows a road trip undertaken by an unemployed Elvis fanatic who undertakes a road trip to Prestwick, Scotland, the only place Elvis Presley ever set foot in the UK.

In 2009, after Hines' diagnosis of Alzheimer's disease prevented him from further writing, Pomona Books published This Artistic Life, an anthology of previously unpublished short stories mostly written around the time of A Kestrel for a Knave.

== Style and themes ==
According to Dave Gibson, Hines' work is "characterised by his ear for dialogue, his sympathetic use of Barnsley dialect and his identification with working-class struggles". His writing has been described as social realist. Imogen Carter notes that A Kestrel for a Knave features "dazzling natural imagery, reminiscent of Seamus Heaney's 1966 poetry collection, Death of a Naturalist."

Hines's work frequently addressed contemporary British social issues, such as education in A Kestrel for a Knave, unemployment in Looks and Smiles, and working conditions and industrial action in the mining industry in The Price of Coal and The Heart of It. Football appears extensively in his writing; Hines recalled that being told he "knew what the game was all about" by a professional footballer was one of the best critiques he had received.

== Recognition ==
Hines' work has received significant recognition. Kes won a number of awards, including a Writers' Guild of Great Britain Award for Best British Screenplay and a BAFTA nomination for Best Screenplay.

Threads (1984) won a special award at the 1985 Monte-Carlo Television Festival, the Broadcasting Press Guild Award in 1985 for Best Single Drama, and was nominated for seven different awards in the 1985 BAFTA Awards, winning the Best Single Drama award.

Hines claimed he took no pleasure in receiving awards; his main concern was the approval of working-class readers and the confirmation that they had been represented accurately. Some of his readers claimed that A Kestrel for a Knave was the only book they had ever read. Ian McMillan wrote that "here in the former South Yorkshire coalfield A Kestrel for a Knave is our Moby-Dick, our Things Fall Apart, our Great Gatsby."

Hines was awarded an honorary degree at the University of Loughborough in July 2009 and an Honorary Doctorate (Doctor of Letters) at the University of Sheffield on 14 January 2010. In 2008, his personal archive was donated to the university, where it is now part of the Library Special Collections.

Upon his death, he received tributes from literary and political figures. Tony Parsons described him as "inspirational" and Barnsley Central MP Dan Jarvis described him as "a brilliant writer". Ken Loach wrote "he loved language and his ear for dialect and its comedy was pitch perfect."

== Personal life ==
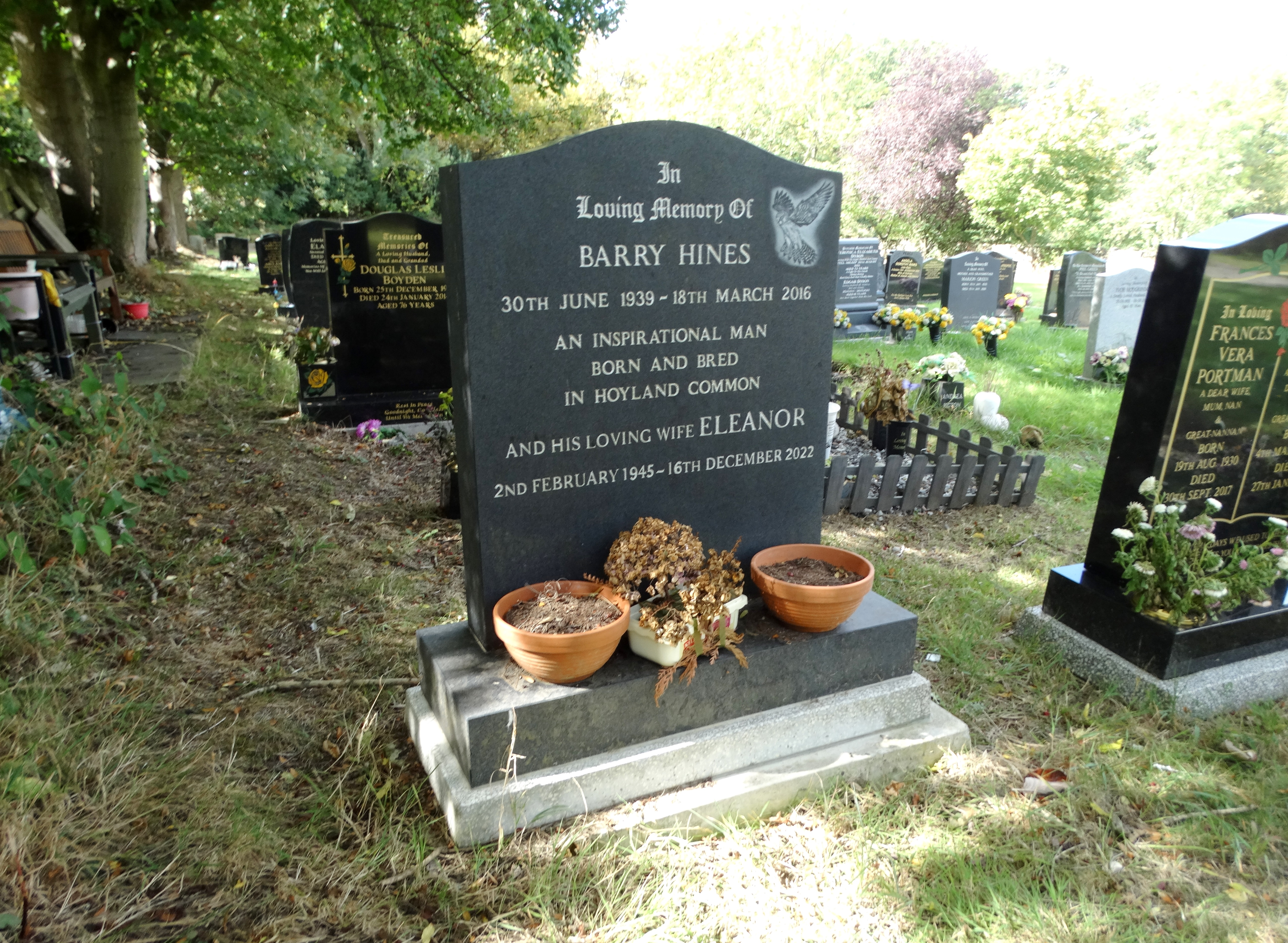
Barry Hines' Grave

Hines married twice, and is survived by two children from his first marriage.

After spending much of his later life in Sheffield, he returned to a care home in his home village of Hoyland Common after a diagnosis of Alzheimer's disease. He died on 18 March 2016 at the age of 76.

== Works ==
=== Novels ===
- The Blinder (1966)
- A Kestrel for a Knave (1968) (later filmed as Kes, Hines co-writing the script)
- First Signs (1972)
- The Gamekeeper (1975) (later made into a film, Hines co-writing the script)
- Looks and Smiles (1981) (later made into a film, Hines writing the script)
- Unfinished Business (1983)
- The Heart of It (1994)
- Elvis over England (2000)
- Springwood Stars (2024) (completed in 2002)

=== Short story collections ===
- This Artistic Life (2009)

=== Radio, film and television ===
- Billy's Last Stand (1970)
- Speech Day (1972)
- Two Men From Derby (1976)
- The Price of Coal (1977)
- Threads (1984)
- Shooting Stars (1990)
- Born Kicking (1992)
