= Fatherland (1986 film) =

- DVD cover
- Directed by: Ken Loach
- Screenplay by: Trevor Griffiths
- Produced by: Raymond Day
- Starring: Gerulf Pannach
- Cinematography: Chris Menges
- Edited by: Jonathan Morris
- Music by: Christian Kunert; Gerulf Pannach
- Production companies: Kestrel II; MK2 Productions
- Distributed by: Film Four International
- Release date: 1986
- Running time: 110 minutes
- Countries: United Kingdom; West Germany
- Languages: English; German
- Budget: £884,000

Fatherland (released as Singing the Blues in Red in the US) is a 1986 film about a German singer-songwriter, directed by Ken Loach and starring Gerulf Pannach, Fabienne Babe, Cristine Rose and Sigfrit Steiner.

== Production ==
=== Financing ===
The film was partly financed by the German television broadcaster ZDF.

== Release ==
The film is one of Loach's least-popular films, being referred to as "a heavy-handed and absurd political drama" in MIT's newspaper The Tech and Loach said in a 2016 Guardian interview that he "made a mess" of the film. As the film was partly in German, its audience was limited in English-speaking countries.

When the film was broadcast, they cut the scene in which Gerulf Pannach attacks a Christian Democrat politician for his fascist past. Loach said in an interview, "It was ironic that they should cut the only decent scene in the film."
