= The Gamekeeper (film) =

1980 film

- Directed by: Ken Loach
- Written by: Barry Hines; Ken Loach
- Starring: Phil Askham
- Cinematography: Chris Menges; Charles Stewart
- Edited by: Roger James
- Release date: 1980
- Running time: 84 minutes
- Country: United Kingdom
- Language: English

The Gamekeeper is a 1980 British drama film directed by Ken Loach. It is based on a novel of the same name by Barry Hines. It competed in the Un Certain Regard section at the 1980 Cannes Film Festival. As with Barry Hines's other scripts, most of the dialogue is in Yorkshire dialect.

The film was produced by Associated Television, which broadcast to the English Midlands. On its release, it was only shown in the ATV area and at a few film festivals. The dialogue in the film was difficult for residents in some areas of the Midlands to understand. After this very limited release, the film fell into obscurity and became one of Loach's rarest films. In September 2007, it was released on DVD for the first time in the Ken Loach Collection boxset and again became widely available. The DVD recording was remastered by the British Film Institute from a recording of the original ATV broadcast, with a director's commentary as an extra.

== Plot ==
George Purse is a former steelworker who is employed as a gamekeeper on a large estate on the outskirts of Sheffield. (One scene in the film mentions Hoyland Nether, just north of Sheffield, which was the home of scriptwright Barry Hines) One of his duties is to apprehend those who trespass on the land or poach animals on the land, and to take them to the police. His son is bullied at school by children who he has apprehended.

He is loyal to the Duke of the estate, even though he has difficulties with arranging basic repairs to the cottage that he lives in. His wife, Mary, feels isolated in the cottage and has misgivings about the annual pheasant shoot that George takes part in. George is not sentimental about animals and refuses to allow his son to keep a pet cat. The film shows George restraining, trapping and sometimes killing animals. (There is no disclaimer in the credits to say that no animals were harmed in the film, so it is not always clear if these scenes were real or not. Ken Loach says in the audio commentary that the shooting of the fox was real.)

In one discussion in a pub, two friends argue with George that poaching is no great crime. The discussion moves on to the question of land ownership and its origins in the courting of favour from the monarch. George is resistant to this argument at first, saying that he "has a job to do". However, in a later discussion with another worker on the estate, he uses almost the same argument against the Duke's inherited wealth, suggesting that he is having some doubts about his position.

Whilst feeding the pheasants, George catches two former colleagues from the steelworks poaching on the land. One of the colleagues runs and escapes but the other, a man from Durham (played by Gary Roberts), stays behind because his dog is unable to run with him. George threatens to shoot the Durham man's dog unless the man accompanies him to the police station.

Shortly before the shoot begins, George discovers that the beaters are refusing to work unless they have a pay increase. George reacts by joking that the pay demand is not high enough. One beater asks him which side he is on, as George is evasive about his real opinion. The pay demand is conceded. Once the shoot begins, George swears at the beaters and tells them to work harder. A guest complains to the Duke about George's behaviour. The Duke later tells George not to use foul language in front of ladies but subtly gives him a tip for his work. George asks one of the others about the repair to his window-frame, which he had asked about several months ago (at the start of the film), and is rebuffed.

The film ends with George alone, as Mary has left only a pie for him to heat up.

== Cast ==
- Phil Askham - George Purse
- Rita May - Mary
- Andrew Grubb - John
- Peter Steels - Ian
- Michael Hinchcliffe - Bob
- Philip Firth - Frank
- Lee Hickin - Jack
- Jackie Shinn - Landlord
- Paul Brian - Butcher
- Ted Beyer - Alf
- Chick Barratt - Henry
- Willoughby Gray - Duke
- Mark Elwes - Lord Dronfield
- Gary Roberts - Poacher

== Analysis ==
Scriptwright Barry Hines is quoted as saying that the film is "about class, not gamekeepers. You don't have to say anything; you just show it". Director Ken Loach said that the film was an exploration of contradictions, as George Purse had gained the freedom of being in the open air but become isolated from his family.

Jonathan Rosenbaum has said, "The contradictions in his social position that gradually emerge -– his fanatical concern for his boss’s property and domain, and the relatively uncertain grasp he maintains over his own (family and home included) –- is neither forced nor strident, but lingers afterward like a slightly bitter aftertaste."

Virgile Dumez has praised the photography of Chris Menges but criticised the film as boring.
