= Middlethorpe =

Middlethorpe is the name of three settlements in England:

- Middlethorpe, North Yorkshire, a hamlet in the City of York
  - Middlethorpe Hall, a historic house
- Middlethorpe, East Riding of Yorkshire, a hamlet in the civil parish of Londesborough
- Middlethorpe, Lincolnshire, a hamlet in the civil parish of West Ashby
