= Hoyland =

Town in South Yorkshire, England

Coordinates: 53.498504°N 1.440571°W

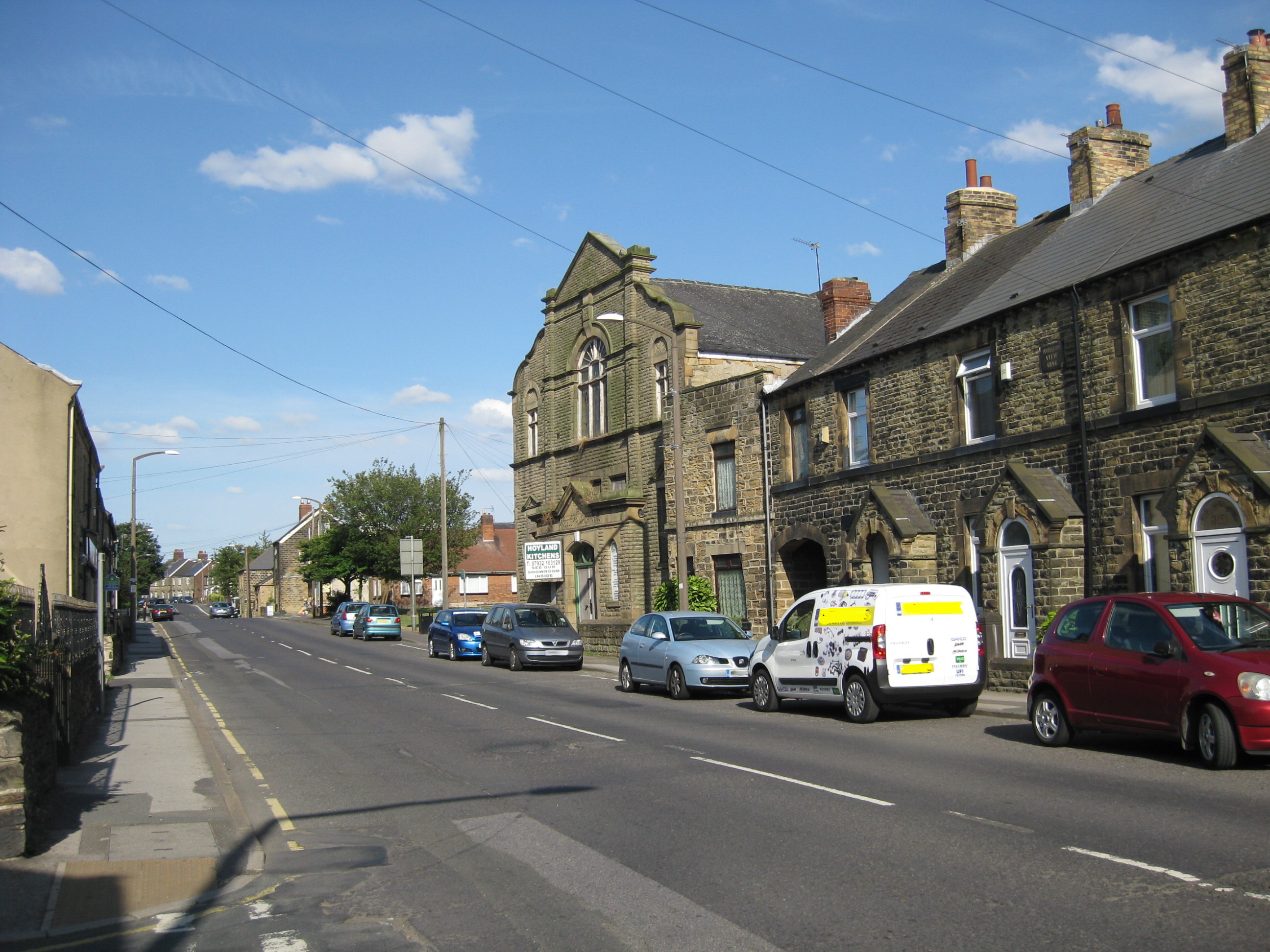
- Hoyland Road, Hoyland Common

- Location within South Yorkshire
- Population: 11,852 (Ward. Hoyland Milton. 2011)
- OS grid reference: SE372003
- Metropolitan borough: Barnsley
- Metropolitan county: South Yorkshire
- Region: Yorkshire and the Humber
- Country: England
- Sovereign state: United Kingdom
- Post town: BARNSLEY
- Postcode district: S74
- Dialling code: 01226
- Police: South Yorkshire
- Fire: South Yorkshire
- Ambulance: Yorkshire
- UK Parliament: Barnsley South

Hoyland is a town in the Metropolitan Borough of Barnsley in South Yorkshire, England.

The town has also been known as Nether Hoyland. When the urban district council was formed the name used was Hoyland Nether Urban District Council. Hoyland Nether comprised the town of Hoyland, Hoyland Common, Upper Hoyland, Elsecar, Milton, Platts Common and Wentworth.

Hoyland is part of the Metropolitan Borough of Barnsley in the metropolitan county of South Yorkshire, but it lies within the historic boundaries of the West Riding of Yorkshire. In 2001 it had a population of 15,497. At the 2011 Census the appropriate ward (Hoyland Milton) had a population of 11,852.

The name Hoyland derives from Old Norse meaning 'land on a hill spur'. The first element meaning "high" or "tall". The last element is land which means "land" or "district". In Norway, the name can also be found including Høyland Church, Høyland Municipality, and Høylandet Municipality.

== Governance ==
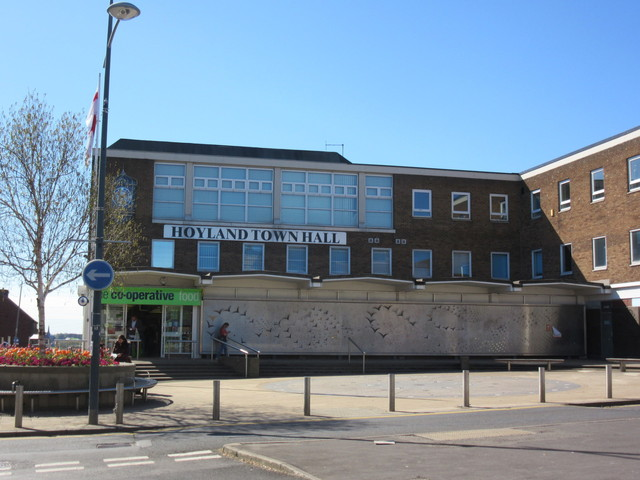
The former Hoyland Town Hall

Hoyland Nether UDC was formed in 1894. Its jurisdiction covered Elsecar, Hoyland Common, Platts Common and Skiers Hall (until 1938, when boundary changes took place Alderthwaite and part of Harley) were administered by Hoyland. This land was exchanged with Rotherham RDC for some land in Brampton Bierlow, which included the site of Elsecar Main Colliery, as well as Hoyland itself. It lasted until 1974 at which point it was merged into Barnsley MBC. Hoyland Town Hall is still standing and its upper floors have been converted into apartments.

== Buildings ==
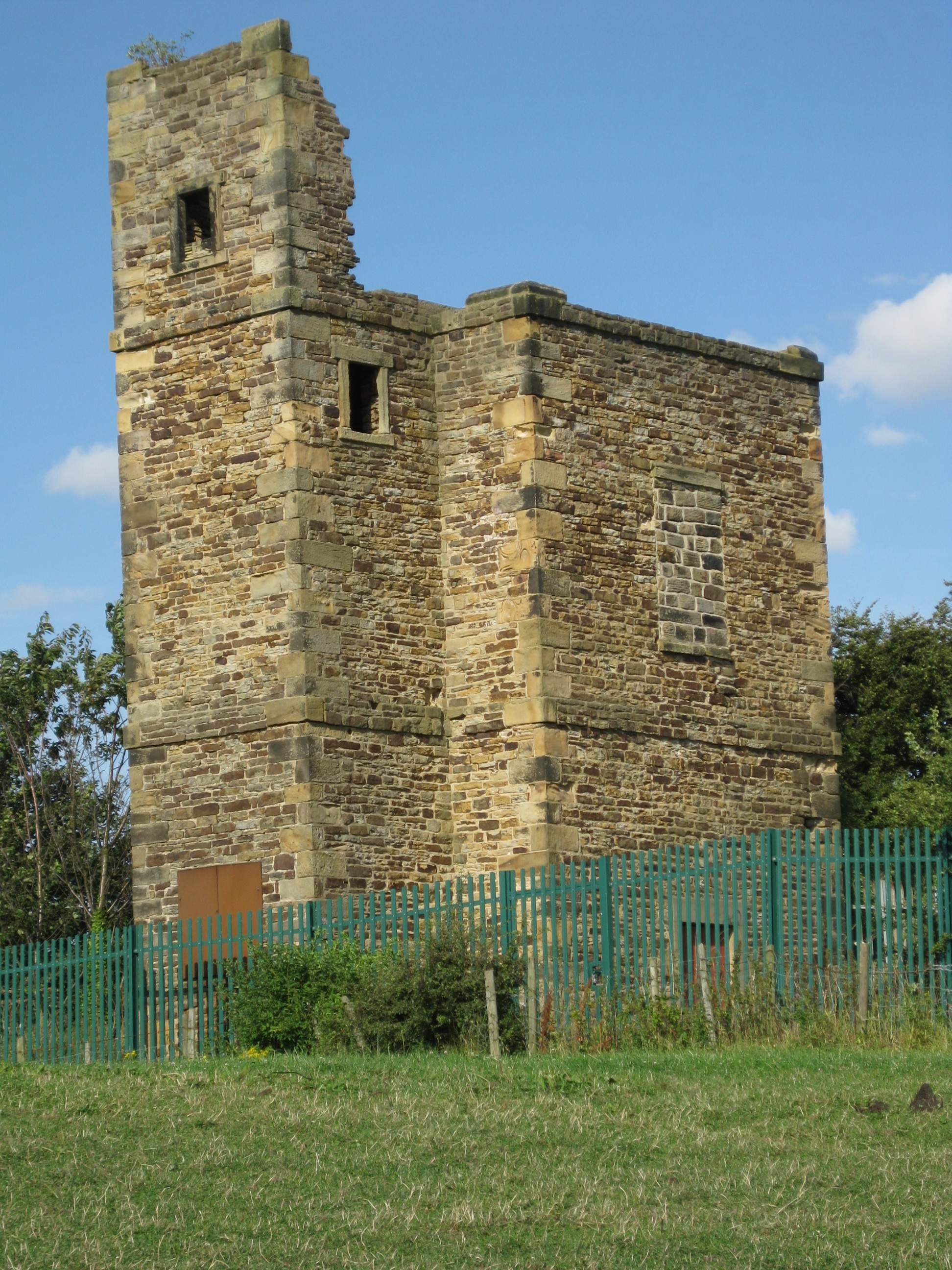
Lowe Stand

The town is home to an 18th-century folly called Lowe Stand, built as a lookout and hunting lodge shortly before his death by the first Marquess of Rockingham, at the highest point in the area some 593 ft above sea level. On the sloping ground below this folly is Upper Hoyland Hall, the former home of a notable family of yeoman farmers, the Townends, who owned extensive land in Hoyland.

The Church of England parish church is St Peter's, a Grade II listed building dating from 1830. It is in the Gothic Revival style and is built of sandstone and slate roofed. The Roman Catholic church (1929) is of brick and tile construction in the Italian Romanesque style, with a square bell tower. The former Princess Theatre on West Street is a brick building dating from 1893.

Among Hoyland's remaining notable older residences and former residences are Hoyland Hall, a late Georgian property, situated in a small park off Market Street and sometime home to William Vizard, first owner of Hoyland Silkstone Colliery, who was the attorney to Queen Caroline at her celebrated trial in the House of Lords. Also in or off Market Street are Kirk House, Kirk Cottage, Bark House, Thistle House and Riversdale. Netherfield House is situated near the town centre and Hoyland's oldest known surviving residence and at one time the home of a Townend, being in recent years used as a dentist's, is situated in West Street (formerly Finkle Street). Many of Hoyland's fine Georgian properties, consisting of cottages, shops and chapels were demolished in the 1960s and 1970s.

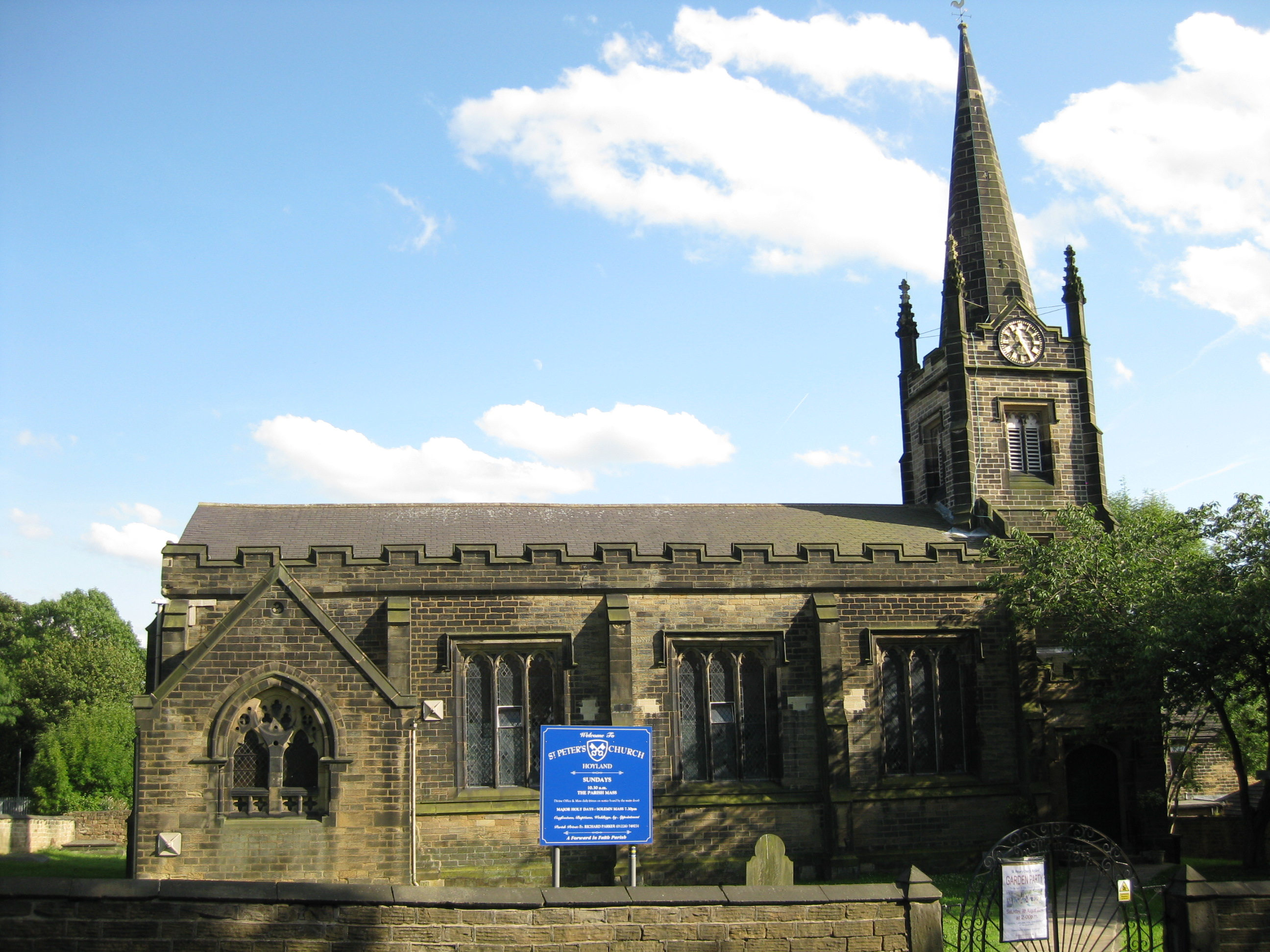
St Peter's C of E Parish Church

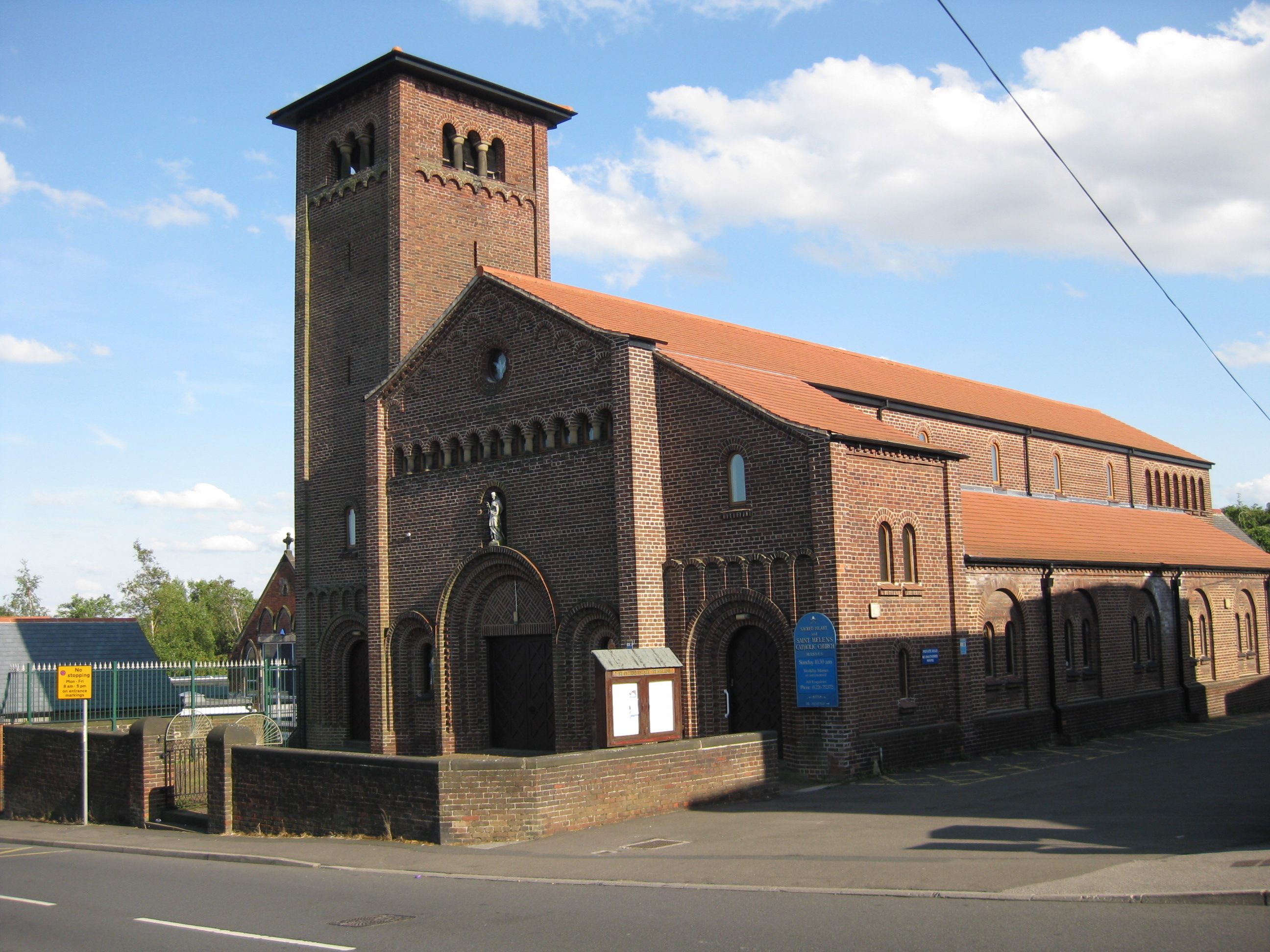
Sacred Heart & St Helen's Catholic Church

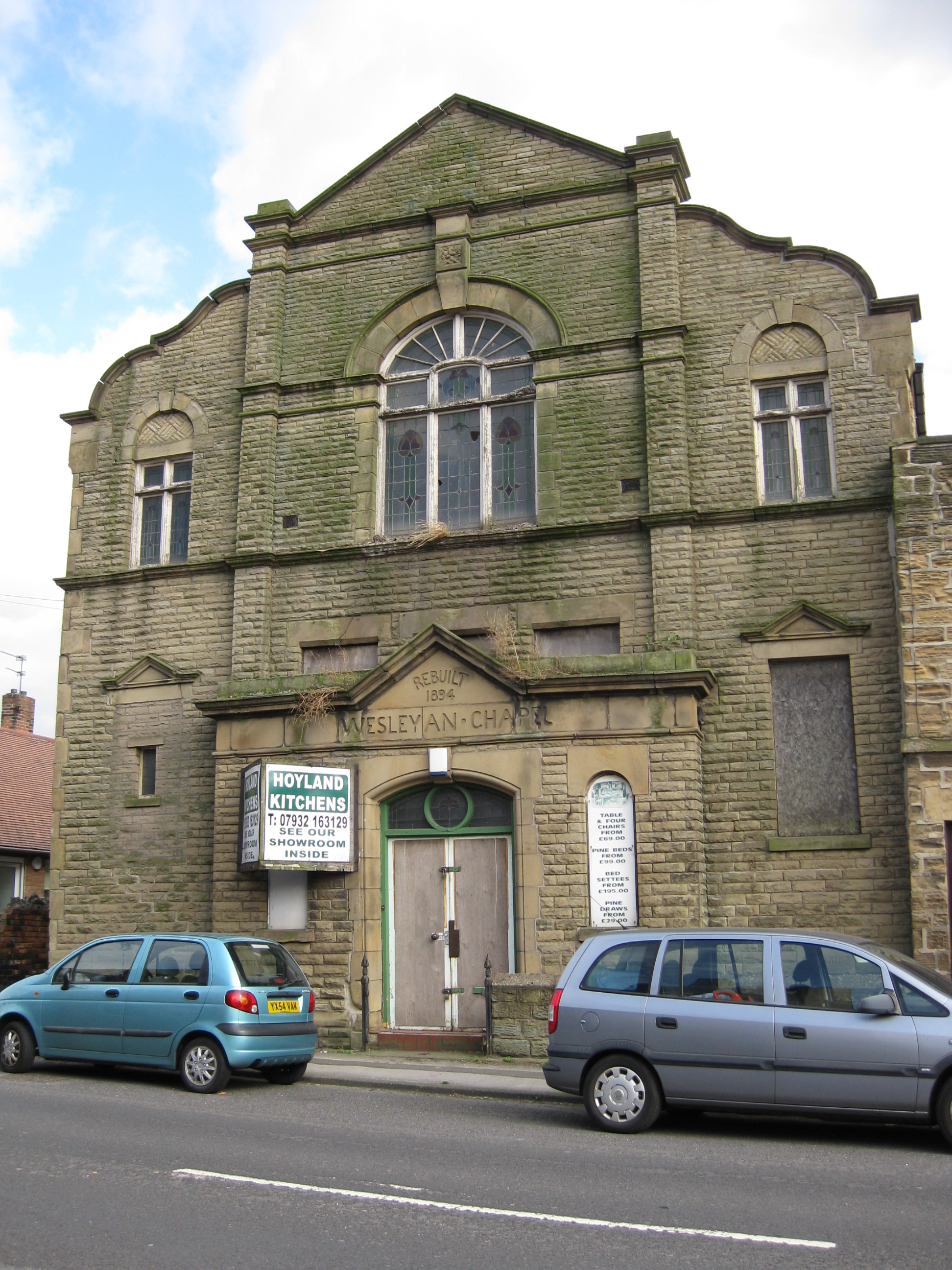
Former Wesleyan Chapel

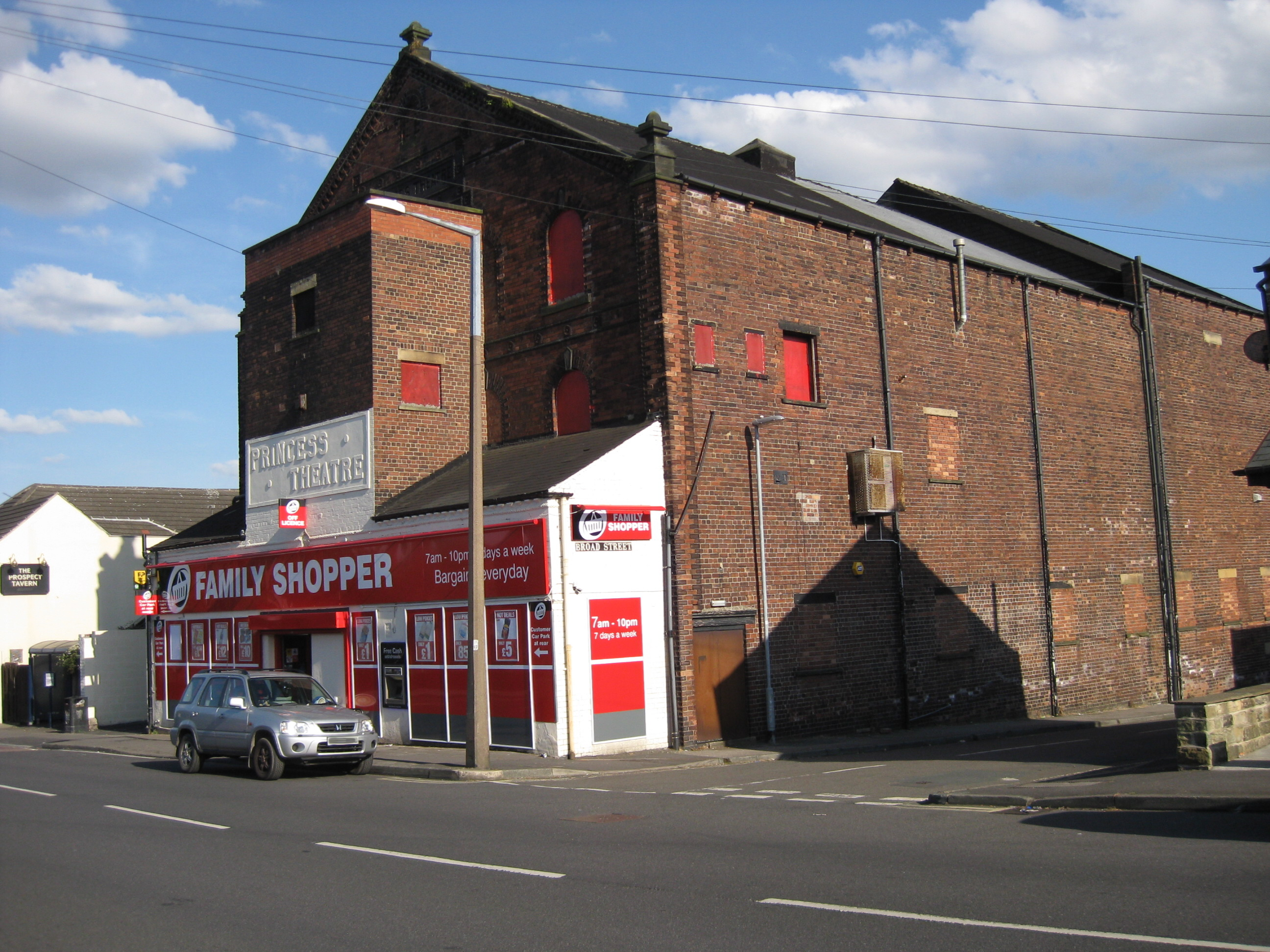
Former Princess Theatre

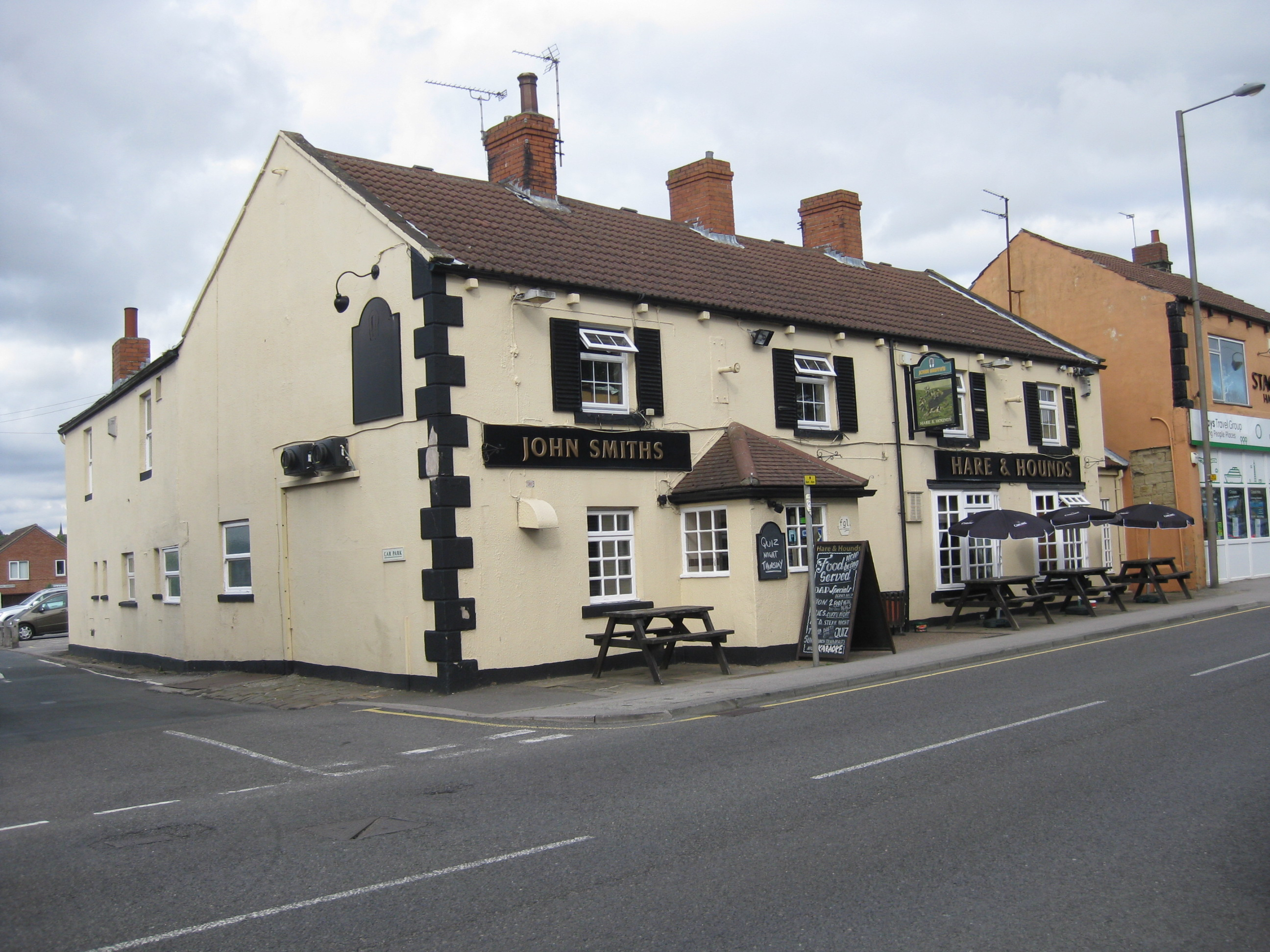
Hare & Hounds

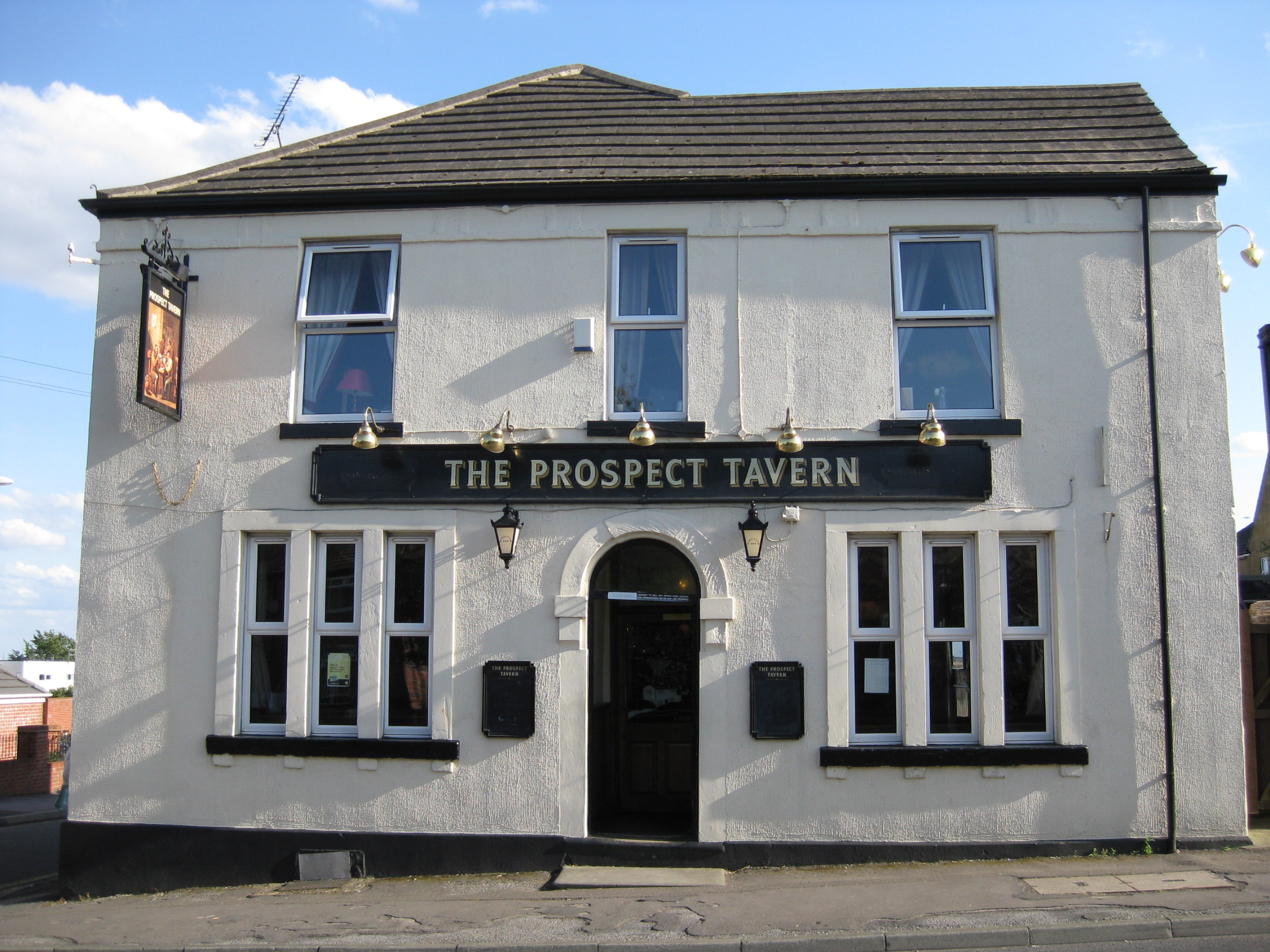
Prospect Tavern

== Education ==
- Greenfield Primary School
- Hoyland Common Primary School
- Hoyland Springwood Primary School
- Hoyland West Meadows Primary School
- Kirk Balk Academy
- St Helen's Catholic Primary School, founded in 1897

== Notable people ==
- Tommy Boyle (1886–1940), footballer, born in Platts Common. Tommy's death in the Second World War led to him being buried in an unmarked grave in Hoyland Cemetery. In 2010, his grave was located and a granite headstone erected.
- Barry Hines, (1939–2016), writer, born and brought up in Hoyland Common. Hoyland area is mentioned in the film of his script, The Gamekeeper. The Hoyland Nether area was used extensively for the filming of Kes.
- Mark Crossley Professional International Football Goalkeeper, born and bred in Hoyland Common. His father was coach of junior football club Hoyland Common Falcons.
- John Mayock, Olympic athlete, educated at St Helen's Catholic School and Kirk Balk Comprehensive School.
- Brian Wildsmith, artist specialising in illustrating children's books, born and brought up in Hoyland Common and educated at St.Helen's Catholic School, Hoyland
- Harry Worth (1917–1989), comedian was born and brought up in Fitzwilliam Street.

== Sport ==
Hoyland has had as many as five football teams compete in the FA Cup: Hoyland Town F.C., Hoyland Silkstone F.C., Hoyland Common Wesleyans F.C., Hoyland St. Peter's F.C. and Hoyland Common Athletic F.C..

== See also ==
- High Hoyland
- Listed buildings in Rockingham
