= Bowes (surname) =

Bowes is a surname shared by several notable people. In Ireland, it is mostly an anglicised form of Ó Buadhaigh

- Barnard Foord Bowes (1769–1812), British major general
- Bill Bowes (1908–1987), English cricketer
- Bob Bowes (1922–1979), English actor and teacher
- Chad Bowes (born 1992), South African cricketer
- Cliff Bowes (1894 – 1929), American silent film actor
- Danny Bowes (born 1960), English musician
- David Bowes (born 1957), American painter
- Edward Bowes (1874–1946), known as Major Bowes, American radio personality
- Elizabeth Bowes (1505–1572), English Protestant exile
- George Bowes (disambiguation), multiple people, including:
  - George Bowes (MP for County Durham) (1701–1760), English Member of Parliament and businessman
  - George Bowes (soldier) (1527–1580), English military commander, MP for Morpeth and Knaresborough
  - George Bowes (rebel) (1517–1556), English commander in border warfare
- G.K. Bowes, American voice actress
- Hollie-Jay Bowes (born 1989), English actress
- Jerome Bowes (died 1616), English ambassador to Russia and Member of Parliament in England
- John Bowes (disambiguation), multiple people
- Lisa Bowes, Canadian sports anchor
- Margie Bowes (1941–2020), American country music singer
- Mark Bowes (born 1973), Scottish footballer
- Martin Bowes (c. 1500–1566), English politician
- Mary Bowes, Countess of Strathmore and Kinghorne (1749–1800), English playwright, among the wealthiest heiresses in Britain of the late 18th century
- Philip Bowes (born 1984), British boxer
- Richard Bowes (1944–2023), American author of science fiction and fantasy
- Robert Bowes (disambiguation), multiple people, including:
  - Robert Bowes (lawyer) (1495–1554), English Master of the Rolls and warden on the Scottish border
  - Robert Bowes (diplomat) (1535–1597), English diplomat, MP for Knaresborough, Carlisle, Appleby and Cumberland
  - Robert Bowes (died 1600), MP for Thirsk and Richmond
- Shane Bowes (born 1969), Australian motorcycle speedway rider
- Thomas Bowes (disambiguation), multiple people, including:
  - Thomas Bowes (translator), English translator
  - Thomas Bowes (violinist) (born 1960), English violinist and orchestra leader
- Tom Armstrong Bowes (1869–1954) English physician and antiquarian
- Walter Bowes (1882–1957), English-born industrialist and sportsman
- William Bowes (disambiguation), multiple people

== See also ==
- Bowes-Lyon, a Scottish family
