= Wharncliffe Woodmoor 1, 2 & 3 Colliery =

Former coal mine in South Yorkshire, England

Coordinates: 53.582°N 1.460°W

Wharncliffe Woodmoor map 1932

Wharncliffe Woodmoor 1, 2 and 3 colliery (part of Wharncliffe Woodmoor Colliery Company Ltd, the Wharncliffe Woodmoor Colliery Company was formed in 1873 when it purchased the New Willey Colliery, which had been sunk in 1871) was a coal mine that was located at the junction of Laithes Lane and Carlton Road, about 2 miles (3.2 km) north-east of Barnsley, South Yorkshire and a quarter mile east of Staincross and Mapplewell railway station, on the Great Central Railway. The branch line junction was about 200 feet (61 m) from Staincross that connected it to the colliery via a private line. The line finished up between the three main shafts and the coking ovens.

== History ==
The colliery was sunk in 1871 just after Joshua Willey, a Hoyland wine and spirit merchant, leased land from the Earl of Wharncliffe. Willey sank two shafts, reaching the Woodmoor Seam in November 1871. The colliery eventually had four shafts (No.3 used as a Pumping Station from 1970 to 1988). In its earlier days the pit was also known as 'Old Carlton'. It received its modern name from the landowner, the Earl of Wharncliffe, and the Woodmoor seam of coal, first exploited in the 1870s. Willey sold the colliery in 1873 and a new company, the Wharncliffe Woodmoor Coal Co. was formed. During the mid-1870s there was an apparent collapse in the coal industry and the colliery was again available to buy. The colliery was purchased at auction by Joseph Willey for £18,000. Howard Allport became the new owner in 1881 and in 1883 converted the privately owned business into a limited liability concern and become known as the Wharncliffe Woodmoor Colliery Co. Ltd. The colliery occupied a large site, with coke ovens, brickworks to the east of the colliery producing 50,000 bricks per week and an engine shed. The site was south-west of the village of Carlton, between Carlton Lane and Laithes Lane. Seams worked were Haigh Moor, Barnsley, Kent's Thick, Winter, Lidgett and Beamshaw. During the 1930s the company had listed William Sutherland (Scottish politician) and Lady Sutherland of Braithwaite Hall, Darton as principal owners/directors. The couple had other business interests in the town including the North Gawber and Woolley collieries. At the time of nationalisation in 1947 the colliery employed 1069 workers underground. In November 1965 it was announced by the National Coal Board that an accelerated pit closure programme would get under way affecting 120,000 men. Collieries were categorised as Class 'A' (likely to continue), Class B (doubtful) and Class C (likely to close) of which Wharncliffe was included. The colliery closed in 1965\6 but continued as a pumping station until 1988 (Wharncliffe Woodmoor Nos.4 & 5 closed in July 1970).

== Disaster ==
The disaster at Wharncliffe Woodmoor colliery claimed fifty-eight lives and devastated the local community. It was the last of what we might regard as a major colliery disaster in South Yorkshire. It remains the worst South Yorkshire mining disaster in modern times. The disaster was caused by an explosion of gas from the Lidgett Seam on the morning of 6 August 1936. The Lidgett Seam which was just over two feet thick and was reached by drifts from the Haigh Moor Seam which was 34 yards above. The Haigh Moor Seam was 280 yards from the surface. The explosion occurred during the latter part of the night shift, at about 3.20 am (this was confirmed by a shaftman on the surface who noticed a sudden reversal of air at that time), when men were involved in repair work and making preparations for the day shift. S.O.S messages were sent out immediately to neighbouring collieries and six rescue teams arrived. These were from Woolley, Barnsley Main, Barnsley Rescue Station, North Gawber, Monckton Main and the rescue team from Wharncliffe Woodmoor. Rescue workers, which hurriedly rushed to the scene were hindered by falls of roof, Wharncliffe Woodmoor No.1 rescue team being the first to descend the mine. They brought news that they had dug through four walls, but that progress had been slow owing to the amount of debris which had to be cleared, and also to further slight falls. A member of the rescue team said that they encountered gas and five canaries which had been taken down the pit had died. Local doctors Dr H. B Pare, Dr. J. Henderson and Dr. H. Henderson (Royston) and Dr. Quigley (Cudworth) arrived on the scene and rendered assistance. The Old Green Road School, Carlton was used as a temporary morgue with nurses standing by. The Vicar of Carlton Rev. N. King, Rev. E.F Owen Vicar of Staincross and Canon W.C Hudson of the Holy Rood Catholic Church, Barnsley offered the crowd spiritual comfort by conducting prayers in the pit yard. The Mayor of Barnsley, Alderman Jones, was visiting Prague at the International Miners Conference with other council and mining officials at the time of the explosion, they had been cabled earlier that morning and informed by about 4:30 pm that afternoon.

== Inquiry ==
The inquest was opened on 30 of the victims in the West Riding Police Court at Barnsley. Mr C. J. Haworth, the Barnsley District Coroner, opened the inquest. There were present Mr. L. Wagstaffe, solicitor representing the colliery company and officials representing the Yorkshire Miners Association and the Yorkshire Deputies Association. The inquiry adjourned and resumed on Monday morning, by then all the bodies had been identified. Dr. Sydney Fisher, Medical Inspector of Mines had now joined the proceedings. Mr. Herbert Smith called for a full, government inquiry.

The subsequent inquiry took place in the Town Hall, Barnsley and took six days. Sir Henry Walker, the Chief Inspector of Mines chaired the inquiry and presented the report to Captain Harry Crookshank (Henry Frederick Comfort Crookshank. 1st Viscount Crookshank) who was the Parliamentary Secretary, Mines, 1935–39. At the inquiry, evidence was then taken concerning the loader motor. The electrician had been instructed to make a general overhaul of the electrical apparatus in 1's district which meant that he would remove the covers and examine the commutator and the starter of each unit. His instructions were that before he removed the covers at the loader motor he would see that the gate end switch was out and the cable between it and the starting switch was disconnected and that he would not run the motors with these covers off. After the explosion the starter switch was found in the off position and the gate end switch had been cut off at the surface. Mr. Thomas Storrs, the chief electrician said he had been present on many occasions when the motors had been opened up and this was the first instance in which he had found a cover off a motor when the cable was connected. Mr. G. Cook, Senior Inspector, was present when the body of the loader was found between the loader and the left side of the gate pack, close to the commutator. This was on the other side from the switch but it was possible for him to reach the switch. The evidence seemed to point to the explosion being caused by a spark from the switch or the commutator of the loader motor but there was no absolute proof.

== Original memorial ==
In 1979 a memorial was dedicated and unveiled by the Yorkshire NUM president Arthur Scargill. The memorial included a commemorative plaque and half pulley wheel in what became Athersley Memorial Park, Royston Carlton Boundary Walk. (SE436409). The commission: To commemorate a mining accident, 6 August 1936, in which 58 men were killed.

Harry Dancer, Chairman of Barnsley MBC's Development and Planning Committee, initiated this scheme which was accepted by this committee on 31 August 1978 and cost £950, approved on 29 September 1978. It was part of reclamation of the Wharncliffe Woodmoor Colliery site on which the monument originally stood. The contractors, Pugh-Lewis, were based in Chesterfield. The memorial was unveiled by Arthur Scargill, then President of the Yorkshire NUM, in the presence of Roy Mason, MP for Barnsley (Roy Mason, Baron Mason of Barnsley), and Cllr Dancer.

== New memorial ==
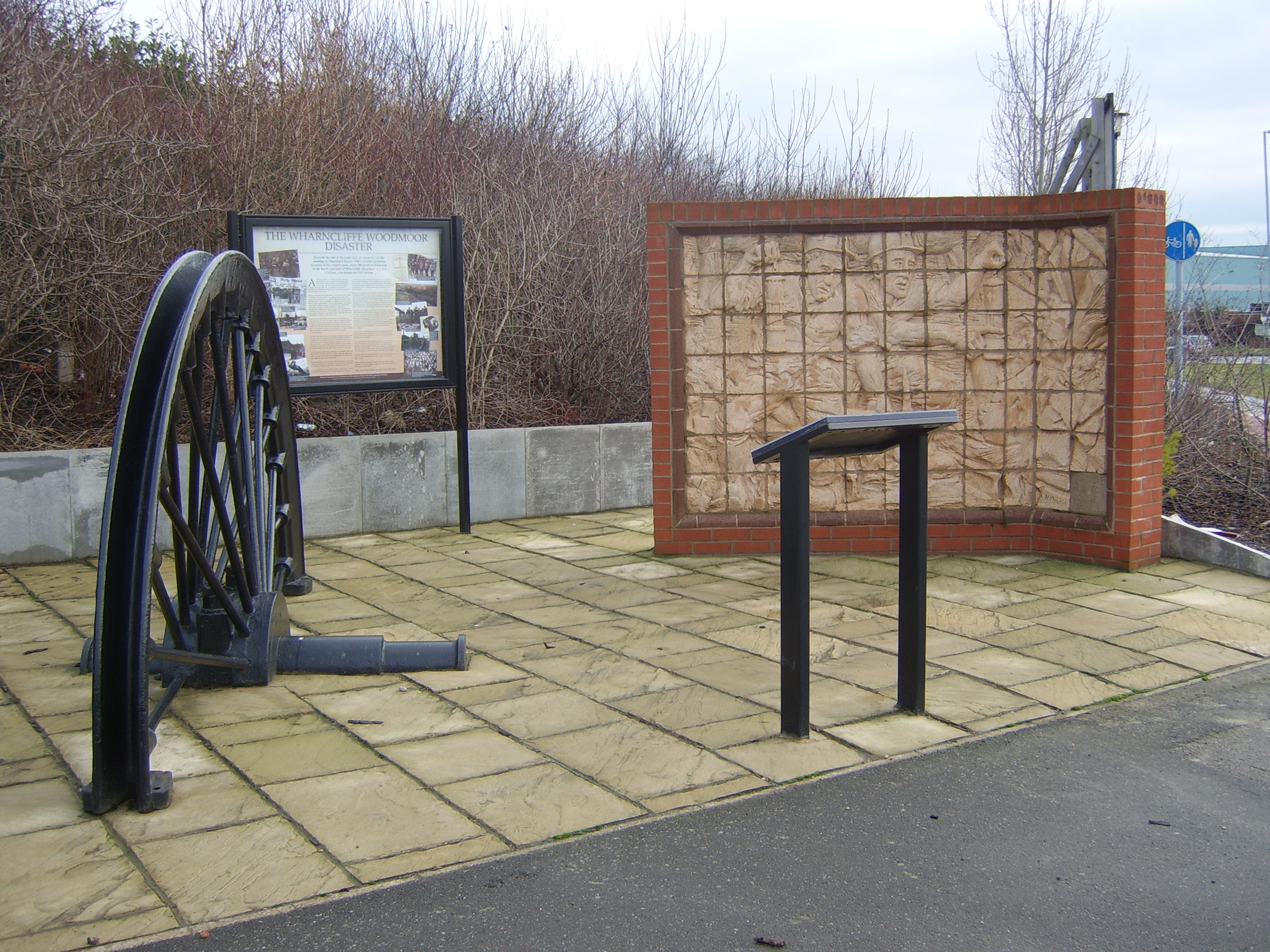
The new Wharncliffe Woodmoor Memorial

In 2008 Barnsley Councillor Len Picken (Councillor Picken was the Mayor of Barnsley for the municipal year 2007/2008) successfully campaigned to have the old half pulley wheel moved to a more prominent location at the entrance of the Wharncliffe Business Park. There was a public appeal that went out via local news media including the BBC. The new memorial was a more emotive piece of work that included the half pulley wheel, a stone frieze, sculptured by Harry Malkin, carved in brick supplied and fired by Ibstock brick company Nostell, Wakefield that depicts two miners searching for their lost colleagues and stands about ten feet by eight. It also includes local news reports from the time of the accident, an information board by local historian Brian Elliot and the names of the Woodmoor victims. The ceremony was led by Councillor Picken and Councillor Roy Butterfield. More than 100 people attended, including numerous relatives and descendants, some with Welsh origins, and representatives from the NUM.

== Post-closure and regeneration ==
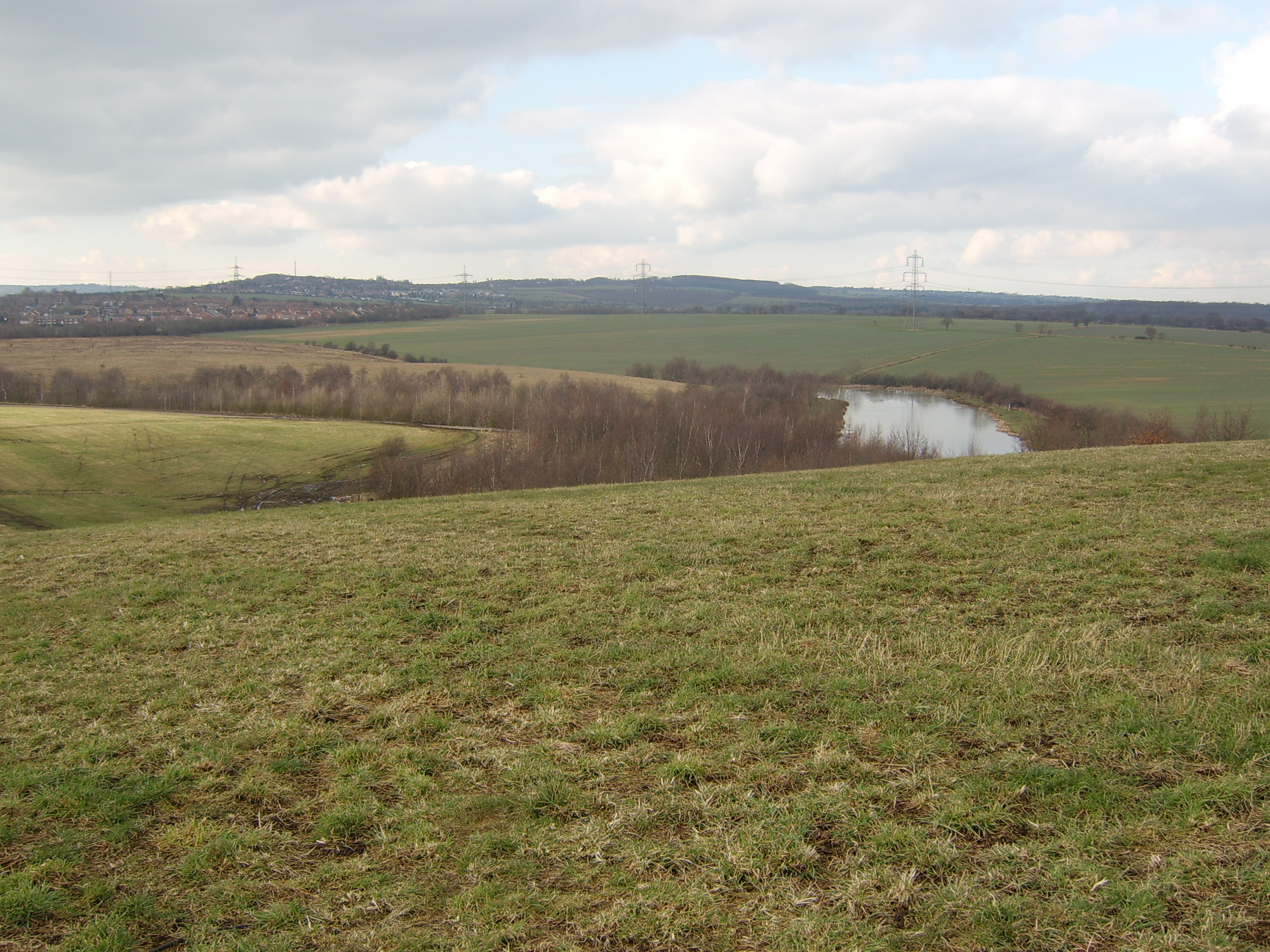
Athersley Memorial Park 2010

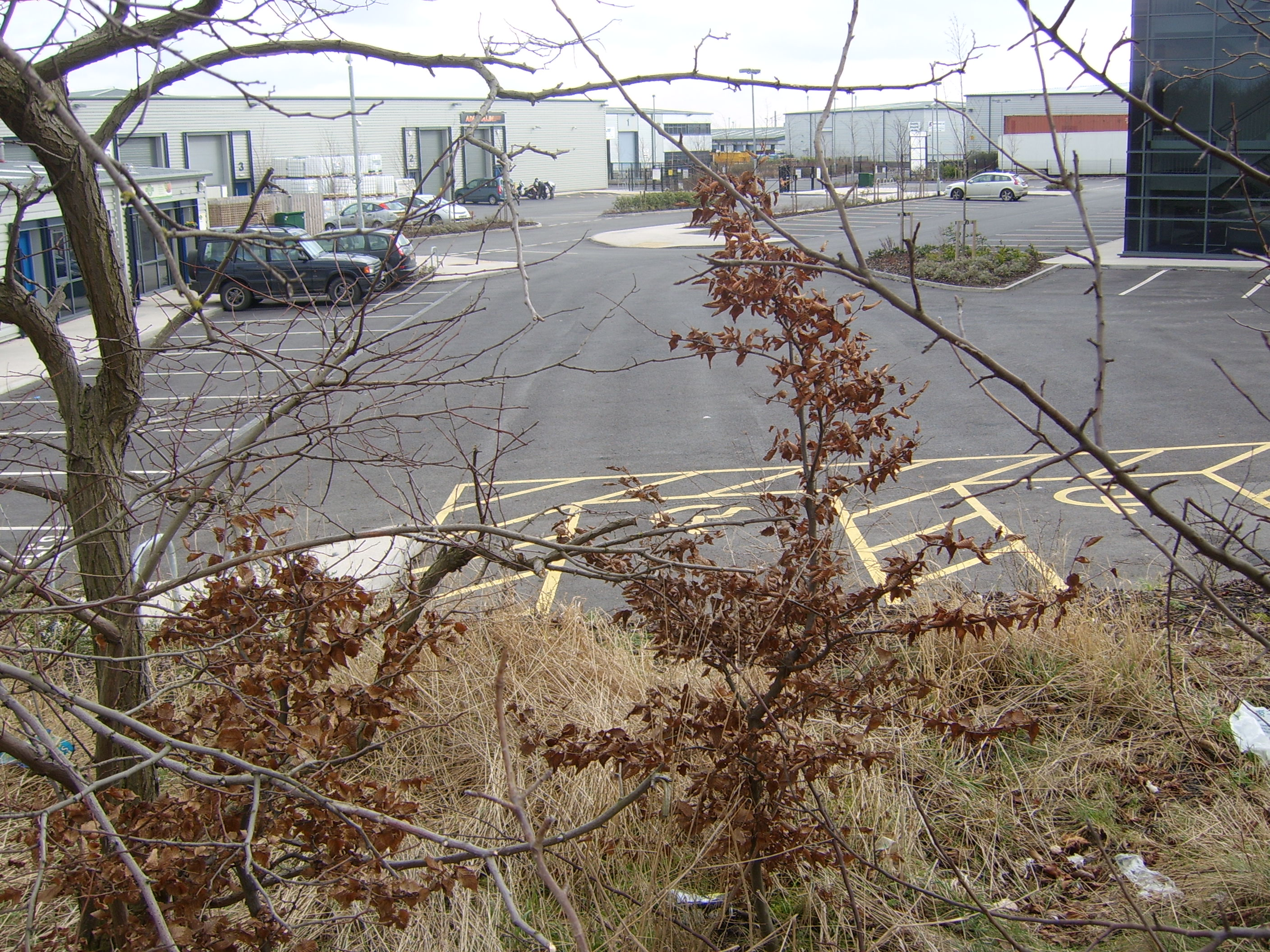
Wharncliffe Business Park

The colliery closed in 1966 as a result of the NCB's pit closure programme. The site was a 30ha waste tip and by now surrounded on three sides by council housing. It was eventually reclaimed and landscaped. There was minimal topsoil available on the site and after an initial flush of surface greening, the vegetation on the tip area partly failed due to acidification. In 1990 another effort was made to regenerate the waste tip once more. A joint project was launched with the National Urban Forestry Unit, Barnsley Metropolitan Borough Council, Yorkshire Water and Sludge Consultant to create a stable and self maintaining planting medium. About 30% of the reclamation has been devoted to forestry and rest put to grass. The site of Wharncliffe Woodmoor is now known as Athersley Memorial Park, Laithes Lane playing fields or the 'pit fields', the park is well used especially by local football teams, for fishing and walkers. An estate of private houses has now been built adjacent to the reclaimed colliery waste tip, confirming the improvement of the area's image. Another £2.7 million development as recently seen the site further develop into a prestigious development of self-contained units known as Woodmoor Court set within Wharncliffe Business Park.
