= Smithies, South Yorkshire =

Area of Barnsley, South Yorkshire, England

Coordinates: 53.5694°N 1.4723°W

Smithies
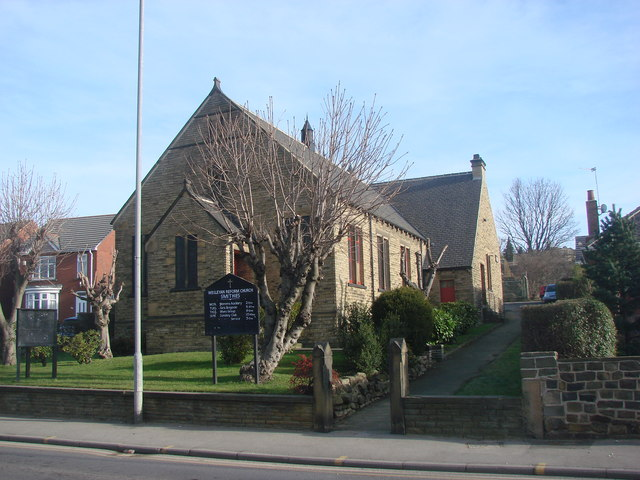
- Wesleyan Reform Church, Wakefield Road

- Location within South Yorkshire
- OS grid reference: SK3508
- Metropolitan borough: Barnsley
- Metropolitan county: South Yorkshire
- Region: Yorkshire and the Humber
- Country: England
- Sovereign state: United Kingdom
- Post town: BARNSLEY
- Postcode district: S71
- Dialling code: 01226
- Police: South Yorkshire
- Fire: South Yorkshire
- Ambulance: Yorkshire
- UK Parliament: Barnsley North

Smithies is an area of Barnsley in South Yorkshire, England. It lies about two miles north-east of the town centre.

Smithies was historically a village in the township of Monk Bretton in the parish of Royston in the West Riding of Yorkshire, on the border with the township of Carlton. Monk Bretton became a separate civil parish in 1866, and in 1921 was absorbed into the County Borough of Barnsley. In 1974 the county borough was abolished, and Smithies became part of the Metropolitan Borough of Barnsley in the new county of South Yorkshire.

== Coal mining ==
A number of collieries were worked in Smithies between 1856 and 1929. East Gawber Hall Colliery, located to the north of the village, opened in 1856 and was worked until the First World War. The remains of the colliery's Guibal fanhouse, built around 1875, are listed as a historic monument.

The Wallsend Main Colliery was sunk before 1901. and was worked with the adjacent Primrose Main Colliery, which was working before 1891. The Wallsend Main Colliery Company was wound up in January 1921.

The Central Silkstone Colliery was sunk in 1907. It was purchased by the East Barnsley Colliery Company (based in Smithies) around 1919, and continued in use until at least 1924.

Wharncliffe Carlton Colliery on the south edge of Smithies was notorious for an explosion in October 1883 that killed 20 miners. While the inquest was being held about the initial explosion, a second underground blast severely injured two more men. The colliery was connected underground with East Gawber Hall, and after the disaster, Wharncliffe Carlton was sealed off from East Gawber Hall and flooded to quench the underground fires, before it could be re-opened.

By 1929, all of the collieries had closed and been demolished.

== Facilities ==
Smithies is home to a Tesco express shop, a bakery, Fish and Chip Shop, Unisex Salon, Local Shop, KFC (on the border), and has a 2005 Harron Homes housing estate, split between here and Monk Bretton.

Smithies is connected to Barnsley Interchange 7 days a week by the number 12 bus service, which operates every 15 minutes Monday-Saturday and every 30 minutes on Sundays. Monday to Saturday, bus 34 and 34a run hourly and are both loop buses, alike no.12, operating via Monk Bretton, Cudworth and Shafton. 34 operates the loop in the direction of Barnsley to Shafton via here and 34a operates via Monk Bretton and Shafton first, before entering Smithies and returning to town.

The 34 and 34a bus services stopped operating for several weeks after Tates Travel went into liquidation, this route was soon taken over by Stagecoach, the only bus operator serving Smithies (except school bus routes).

Smithies has two schools, Springwell Community School, catering for this with special needs. Alongside Holy Trinity Catholic and Church of England School which has both a primary and secondary school in one. Holy Trinity is served by a bus service to Grimethorpe operated by Waterstones and several coach companies operate services to Royston, Cudworth and Baurgh Green.
