= William Bulmer (politician) =

English soldier knight

Sir William Bulmer (by 1465–1531) of Wilton Castle, Wilton, North Riding of Yorkshire was an English soldier knight and Member of Parliament.

== Career ==
He was the son of Sir Ralph Bulmer of Wilton and his wife Joan, the daughter of Sir William Bowes of Streatlam, county Durham. He succeeded his father in 1496 and was knighted after taking part in the Earl of Surrey's Scottish campaign of 1497.

He was appointed sheriff and escheator for county Durham for 1503–16, 1523-7 and jointly with his son Sir John Bulmer for 1527–9. He was appointed High Sheriff of Yorkshire for 1517–18. He also served as a member of the council of 4th Earl of Shrewsbury in 1522 and as lieutenant of the Eastern March and Norham Castle, Northumberland in 1523.

Bulmer joined in the escort of Margaret Tudor to Scotland in 1503. Bulmer fought at the battle of Flodden in 1513. In 1520 he accompanied Henry VIII with other knights to his meeting with Francis I of France at the Field of the Cloth of Gold. In August 1520, William and his son John Bulmer were requested to raise a force of 100 horsemen and bring them to Chester, from where they would travel to serve in Ireland.

In 1523, he received and forwarded letters from Margaret Tudor, and from Isabella Hoppringle, Prioress of Coldstream.

In 1523, William was selected as a knight of the shire for Yorkshire in the Parliament of England. Bulmer was a member of the council and household of Henry FitzRoy, Duke of Richmond and Somerset in 1525.

By his will, Bulmer left his best gold chain worth £100 to his eldest son John Bulmer, and gold chains weighing 100 marks to his younger sons Ralph and William. He founded a chapel of St Ellen at Wilton with four poor men and a bedeswoman.

== Family ==
He married by 1490, Margery, the daughter of John Conyers, with whom he had three sons and a daughter. He was succeeded by Sir John Bulmer.

John Bulmer was executed on 25 May 1537 (some sources say 20 June) in London for his part in Bigod's rebellion. He had married Anne, a daughter of Ralph Bigod of Mulgrave and a sister of Francis Bigod. His second wife, Margaret Cheyne, was executed for her part in the rebellion by burning at Smithfield. A nephew, Ralph Bulmer, recovered the estates of Wilton and Lastingham in 1547.

John Bulmer's daughter Anne married Matthew Boynton of Barmston, who, like Bulmer, was a member of the household of Henry FitzRoy, Duke of Richmond and Somerset in 1527. His daughter or sister Cecily Boynton was a maid of honour to Elizabeth I. Some sources indicate that the mining entrepreneur Bevis Bulmer was a son of this John Bulmer.

William Bulmer's younger son Ralph married Anne, a daughter of Roger Aske of Aske, and the third son William married Elizabeth, a daughter of William Elmedon. His daughter Margery married George Salvin, a son of Sir Ralph Salvin.
