= Edward Sheerien School =

Location
- Carlton Road; Barnsley, South Yorkshire, S71 2BB; England; 53.57870°N 1.45797°W

Information
- Type: Comprehensive
- Motto: Attend, Aspire and Achieve
- Local authority: Barnsley
- Specialist: Performing Arts Specialism
- Head teacher: Mrs Susan Hamby
- Gender: Co-educational
- Age: 11 to 16
- Enrolment: 800 approximately
- Capacity: 900
- Houses: Allendale, Fitzwilliam, Stanhope & Wentworth
- Colours: Pale blue and navy blue
- Website: http://edwardsheerien.co.uk/default.aspx

Edward Sheerien School was a comprehensive school in Barnsley, South Yorkshire, England.

The school had approximately 800 pupils, ages 11–16. The original Edward Sheerien School (1957-1992) was located on Newstead Road, Athersley, before moving to Carlton Road in 1992. The Carlton Road school site was where a large portion of the motion picture Kes was filmed in 1969.

== History ==
=== St Helen's school ===
The Carlton school site was previously occupied by St Helens Comprehensive School, until being amalgamated with Edward Sheerien School in 1992.

St Helen's County Secondary School, on Carlton Lane, opened on 22 November 1963 to cater for children from the Athersley South and Monk Bretton area of Barnsley.

=== Original school ===
Edward Sheerien was leader of the Labour group on Barnsley council from 1923 to 1958. The original Edward Sheerien County Secondary School was located on Newstead Road in Athersley North. It opened in 1956. Harry Pickering Lockwood was headmaster until 1971. A £500,000 sports centre was built next door in 1983.

This building was demolished in 1993.

=== Exam results ===
In 1997 it had terrible GCSE results. 33% passed no GCSEs whatsoever. In 1998, 26% passed no GCSEs, and in 1999 it was 22%. In 2006, 11% gained five good GCSEs including English and Maths.

=== Closure ===
Edward Sheerien School closed in September 2009, merging with Royston High School to establish Carlton Community College. The school went on to relocate to a new site in 2011, and in 2016 became Outwood Academy Carlton.

The site of the school was demolished in early 2011.

== Alumni ==
=== St Helen's County Secondary School ===
- Dai Bradley, child actor
