= George Bowes =

George Bowes may refer to:

- George Bowes (MP for County Durham) (1701–1760, English member of parliament (MP)
- George Bowes (soldier) (1527–1580), English military commander, MP for Morpeth and Knaresborough
- George Bowes (rebel) (1517–1545), English commander in border warfare
- George Bowes (prospector) (died 1606), prospected and mined for gold in Scotland

== See also ==
- John George Bowes (c. 1812–1864), Canadian businessman and politician
