= Robert Bowes =

Robert Bowes may refer to:

- Robert Bowes (lawyer) (1495–1554), English Master of the Rolls and warden on the Scottish border
- Robert Bowes (diplomat) (1535–1597), English diplomat, MP for Knaresborough, Carlisle, Appleby and Cumberland
- Robert Bowes (died 1600) (1553–1600), MP for Thirsk and Richmond
- Robert Bowes (publisher) (1835–1919), Scottish bookseller, publisher, and bibliographer
- Bob Bowes (1922–1979), English teacher and actor
- Robert Bowes (surgeon) (died 1803), president of the Royal College of Surgeons in Ireland
