= Thomas Bowes =

Thomas Bowes may refer to:

- Thomas Bowes (translator), English translator
- Thomas Bowes (violinist) (born 1960), English violinist and orchestra leader

== See also ==
- Tommy Bowe (born 1984), Irish rugby player
- Thomas Lyon-Bowes (disambiguation)
