= Outwood Academy Carlton =

Academy in South Yorkshire, England

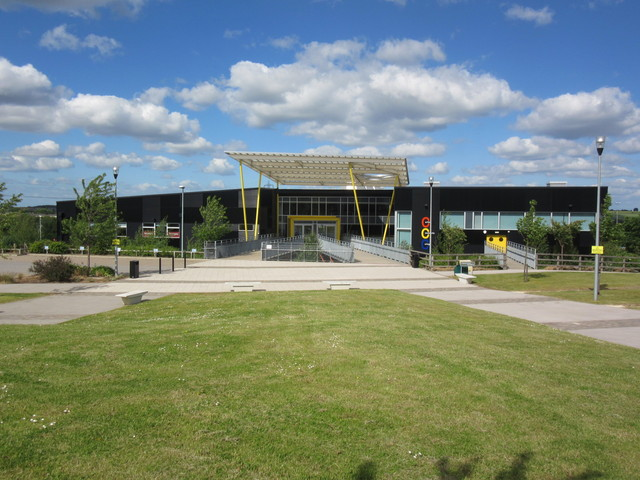

Location
- Royston Lane; Carlton; South Yorkshire, S71 3EW; England; 53.57870°N 1.45797°W

Information
- Type: Academy
- Local authority: Barnsley
- Department for Education URN: 139210 Tables
- Ofsted: Reports
- Head teacher: Paul Taylor
- Gender: Mixed
- Age: 11 to 16
- Enrolment: 746 as of January 2016
- Colours: Purple, Gold and Black
- Website: carlton.outwood.com

Outwood Academy Carlton (formerly Carlton Community College) is a secondary school with academy status located in Carlton, near Barnsley, England. It has a mixed intake of boys and girls ages 11–16 with a comprehensive admissions policy, and in 2016 had an enrolment of 746 pupils.

The school serves the communities of Carlton, Athersley and Royston. It has a unit for children with autism that can accommodate the educational needs of 25 pupils, and a pupil referral unit that can accommodate the educational needs of 10 pupils with behavioural issues.

The school is operated by Outwood Grange Academies Trust and the current principal is Paul Taylor.

== History ==
Carlton Community College was established in September 2009 through the merger of Edward Sheerien and Royston High schools. Initially operating from the site of Edward Sheerien School, it was a community school administered by Barnsley Metropolitan Borough Council.

In 2011 the school moved into a newly constructed site, built as part of the Building Schools for the Future programme and funded through Private Finance Initiative.

In February 2016, the school converted to academy status under the sponsorship of Outwood Grange Academies Trust, and was renamed Outwood Academy Carlton. The school continues to coordinate with Barnsley Metropolitan Borough Council for admissions.
