= Greenacre School =

Greenacre, Greenacres, Green Acre or Green Acres School may refer to:

== Australia ==
- Greenacre Public School, a primary school in Greenacre, New South Wales, Australia

== Canada ==
- Green Acres Elementary School, an elementary school in Hamilton, Ontario, Canada

== New Zealand ==
- Greenacres School, a primary school in Greenacres, Tawa, Wellington, New Zealand

== United Kingdom ==
- Greenacre School for Girls, a girls' independent school in Banstead, Surrey, England
- Greenacre Academy, formerly Greenacre School, a boys' secondary academy in Walderslake, Kent, England
- Greenacres Primary School, a primary school in Greenacres, Greater Manchester
- Greenacre School, Barnsley, an academy in Barnsley, United Kingdom

== United States ==
- Green Acres School, an elementary and middle school in North Bethesda, Maryland, United States
