= Royston High School =

Location
- Station Road; Royston; Barnsley, South Yorkshire, S71 4EQ; England
- Coordinates: 53.60083°N 1.45380°W

Information
- Local authority: Barnsley
- Specialist: Science College
- Gender: Mixed
- Age: 11 to 16
- Website: http://www.roystonhigh.org

Royston High School was a state school in Barnsley, South Yorkshire, England.

Along with City School, Sheffield, Royston High School had links with Malealea in Lesotho, small groups of pupils visited biannually. Pupils and parents organised fund raising activities throughout the year to help the villagers in Malealea.

In 2009, Royston High School was merged with nearby school, Edward Sheerien and was renamed Carlton Community College. Primarily, the school was situated on two different sites which were the old Royston and Athersly campuses. In December 2010, the school moved to a new building in Carlton. The school was renamed Outwood Academy Carlton in 2016.
