= List of schools in South Yorkshire =

There is no county-wide local education authority in South Yorkshire, instead education services are provided by the four smaller metropolitan boroughs of Barnsley, Doncaster, Rotherham and Sheffield:

- List of schools in Barnsley
- List of schools in Doncaster
- List of schools in Rotherham
- List of schools in Sheffield
