= Isabella Hoppringle =

British abbess and spy (1460–1538)

Isabella Hoppringle (1460–1538), was a Scottish prioress and spy. She was the prioress of Coldstream Priory in 1505—1538.

Belonging to a family who often provided prioresses to the priory in Coldstream, she was installed in the position in 1505. She was a personal friend to the Scottish queen dowager regent, Margaret Tudor. As the monastery was near the border of England and Scotland, it was in the midst of the warfare between the nations in 1513. She skillfully managed to balance between the two nations to the benefit of the priory and was reputed as the best agent England had in Scotland.

In 1523, when Margaret Tudor corresponded with William Bulmer, the Prioress wrote to him that Margaret might be fickle, and influenced by the Duke of Albany. In November 1523, she told John Bulmer of Norham Castle that there were plans for the young James V to marry a French princess. This was a rumour designed to raise trouble for Albany.

In 1538, she was succeeded as superior – and reputedly as agent – by her relative Janet Pringle.

== Bibliography ==
- The Biographical Dictionary of Scottish Women, Elizabeth L. Ewan, Sue Innes, Edinburgh University Press, 2006, ISBN 978-0748617135
