= Thomas Lyons =

Thomas Lyons may refer to:

- Thomas Lyons (Medal of Honor) (1838–1904), American Civil War sailor and Medal of Honor recipient
- Thomas Lyons (politician) (1896–1985), Northern Irish politician
- Thomas G. Lyons (1931–2007), American Democratic Party politician from Chicago, Illinois
- Thomas William Lyons (1923–1988), bishop of the Roman Catholic Church in the United States
- Tom Lyons (1885–1938), English footballer
- Tommy Lyons, Irish Gaelic football manager
- Tommy Lyons (American football) (born 1948), former American football offensive lineman, now surgeon
- Thomas Lyons (British Army officer) (1829–1897), British general
- SS Thomas J. Lyons, a Liberty ship

== See also ==
- Thomas Lyon (disambiguation)
