= William Bowes =

William Bowes may refer to:

- Sir William Bowes (MP for County Durham) (1657–1707), English landowner and MP
- William Bowes (15th century MP) (died 1439), MP for City of York
- Sir William Bowes (soldier) (1389–1460), English military commander
- Sir William Bowes (ambassador) (died 1611), English ambassador to Scotland
- Bill Bowes (1908–1987), English cricketer
- Billy Bowes, Scottish footballer
