= Listed buildings in Royston, South Yorkshire =

Royston is a ward in the metropolitan borough of Barnsley, South Yorkshire, England. The ward contains four listed buildings that are recorded in the National Heritage List for England. Of these, one is listed at Grade I, the highest of the three grades, and the others are at Grade II, the lowest grade. The ward contains the town of Royston, the village of Carlton, and the surrounding area. The listed buildings consist of two churches, a wayside cross, and a former farmhouse.

== Key ==
| Grade | Criteria |
|---|---|
| I | Particularly important buildings of more than special interest |
| II | Buildings of national importance and special interest |

== Buildings ==
| Name and location | Photograph | Date | Notes | Grade |
|---|---|---|---|---|
| Kirk Cross; 53.59144°N 1.45311°W | | Medieval | A wayside cross, it is in gritstone. It has a deep square base with a chamfered upper half, and a short rounded shaft. | II |
| St John the Baptist's Church, Royston; 53.59652°N 1.45119°W | | 15th century | The church, which incorporates some 14th-century material, was restored in 1867–69 by J. L. Pearson. It is built in stone with a stone slate roof, and is in Perpendicular style. The church consists of a nave with a clerestory, a chancel, north and south aisles to the nave and chancel, a south porch, and a west tower. The tower has four stages, diagonal buttresses, a west doorway with a moulded surround, and a three-light west window. Above this is a five-sided oriel window with a pyramidal roof, and at the top are gargoyles, an embattled parapet, and crocketed pinnacles. Along the nave are gargoyles, embattled parapets and crocketed pinnacles. | I |
| 100, 102 and 104 High Street; 53.59870°N 1.46278°W | — | 17th century | A farmhouse, later divided, it is rendered, on a plinth, and has roofs of Welsh slate and stone slate, with gable copings on cut kneelers. There are two storeys and attics, and a T-shaped plan. The doorways have chamfered surrounds, and the mullions have been removed from the windows and replaced by casements. | II |
| St John's Church, Carlton; 53.58672°N 1.44839°W | | 1874–78 | The church was designed by G. E. Street, and is in stone with a tile roof. It consists of a nave, a north aisle, a chancel, and a tower over the first bay of the chancel. The tower has a saddleback roof, and to its south is a circular stair tower with a conical roof. The windows contain Decorated tracery, and the east window is large, with four lights. | II |
