= Thomas Lyon =

Thomas or Tom Lyon may refer to:

- Thomas Lyon (settler) (1621–1690), English-born US settler
- Thomas Lyon, 8th Earl of Strathmore and Kinghorne (1704–1753), Scottish nobleman, peer, and politician
- Thomas Lyon (of Auldbar) (died 1608), Treasurer of Scotland
- Thomas Lyon (MP) (1741–1796), Scottish politician and member of Parliament from Aberdeen Burghs
- Tom Lyon, British magician
- Tom Lyon (footballer) (1915–1998), Scottish footballer
- T. Edgar Lyon (Thomas Edgar Lyon, 1903–1978), American educator and historian
- Thomas Lyttleton Lyon (1869–1938), professor of soil science at Cornell University

== See also ==
- Thomas Lyon House, Greenwich, Connecticut
- Thomas Lyons (disambiguation)
- Thomas Lyon-Bowes (disambiguation)
