= Archangelo Arcano =

Italian military engineer

Archangelo Arcano was an Italian military engineer who worked for Henry VIII of England from 1523.

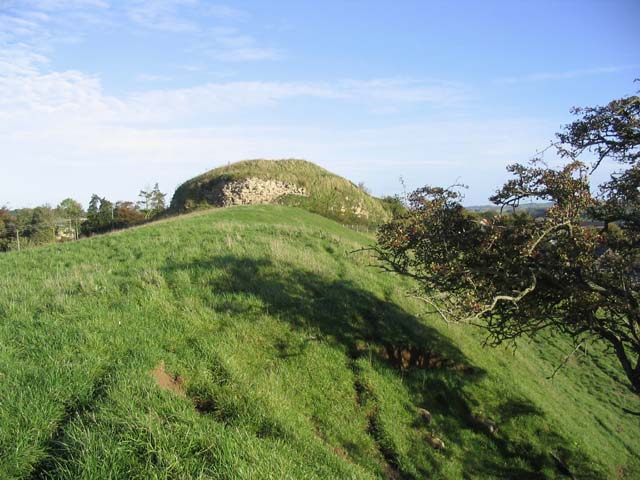
Archangelo Angelo designed modern artillery defences for Wark on Tweed Castle

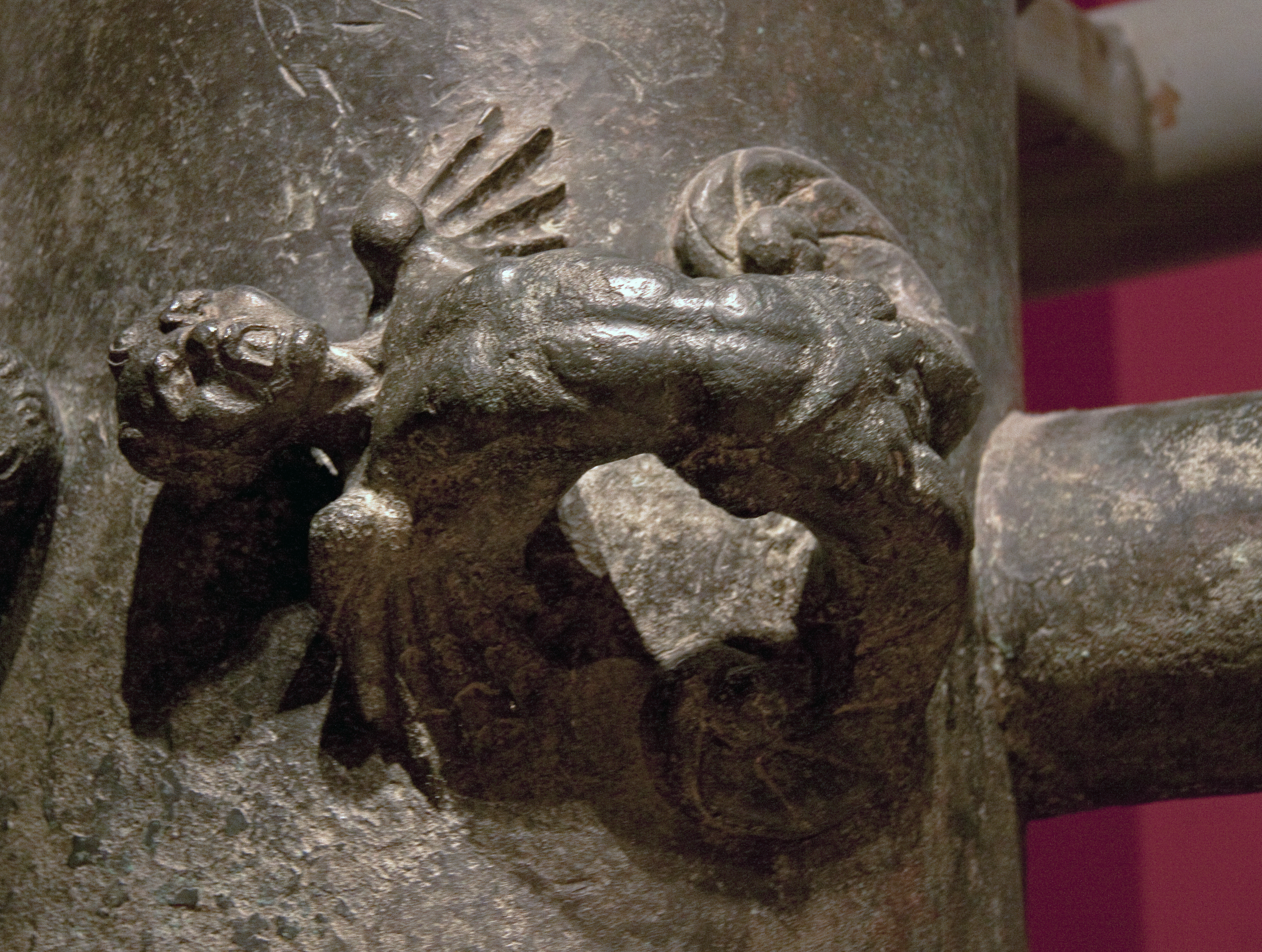
Detail of a cannon made by the Arcano family for the Mary Rose, recovered from the wreck by John Deane in 1840

Arcano's name appears in various forms in records and correspondence, including "Arkan", "Master Archan", and "Arkaungell Arcan". Arcano was one of the royal "gunners". He had a servant, and was accompanied in 1529 by Raphael Arcano, who had the same fee and may have been his brother. Raphael and a third member of the family, Francesco, their father, are identified as gun-founders. There was a brass culverin made by Arcan on the town walls of Portsmouth in 1547. One surviving cannon is engraved "Franciscus Arcanus, Italus", and a brass culverin recovered from the Mary Rose has "Arcanus de Arcanis, Cesenem". The family worked at the royal gun foundry at Salisbury Palace, and Archangelo Arcano is thought to have designed iron guns cast at Buxted in the Weald, including a saker recovered from Padstow harbour in 1895.

The family is thought to have originated from Cesena and to have been recruited into English service by Gregory da Casale. Francesco Arcano had worked on the defences of Cesena with the painter and architect Girolamo Genga, and his portrait is said to be included in an altarpiece by Genga now at the Pinacoteca di Brera. As an architect, Genga is known for his works for Eleonora Gonzaga, Duchess of Urbino.

In England, Francesco was listed in 1541 as an alien in Farringdon Ward Without. His son, Archangelo Arcano was made a denizen of England in August 1541. He presented Henry VIII with a pair of perfumed gloves as a New Year's Day gift in January 1540.

Names of Italian gunners in 1523 were listed in the account of the treasurer of King's Chamber for a payment of £206-9s-10d., made to "Fraunces Archano, Archan his son, Christofer Florent', Jacono Florent', Jerom de Milan, Anthony de Napoll, Michaell de Manna, Magnus de Monfera, Buttesago de Cezena, Italyons, gonners, retyned to do the kynges servyce in his warres". Another record of this army, at Calais, commanded by Charles Brandon, Duke of Suffolk, mentions "Francisco Arcano, master of the Mynes" and "Angelo de Racavado".

Arcano and Giovanni Portinari demolished Lewes Priory for Thomas Cromwell.

== War with Scotland ==
Arcano worked with another Italian, Antonio da Bergamo, at Lindisfarne and Berwick-upon-Tweed. He served with Lord Hertford during the war with Scotland known as the Rough Wooing. In November 1544 he went to assess the potential of Coldingham Priory as a fortress with the Master Mason and Master Carpenter of Berwick. Coldingham was occupied by the English soldiers Henry Eure and George Bowes. Aracano made a sketch plan for defences at Coldingham, known as a "platt", to be sent to Henry VIII for approval.

Arcano was sent to advise on repairs at Wark on Tweed Castle in February 1545. He sent a plan to the Earl of Shrewsbury, noting particularly that the roofs were leaking. Lead could be brought from Kelso Abbey, which Arcano was also fortifying. A plan of Kelso Abbey drawn by Arcano survives, showing planned corner bastions for artillery in the style known as trace Italienne.

In August and September 1545, there were discussions involving both of the Italian engineers and Richard Lee about siting a new fort either at Kelso or at Roxburgh Castle. A fort was built at Roxburgh in the last months of 1547.

Scottish Protestants held St Andrews Castle in 1547 against the forces of Regent Arran. Arcano and another Italian engineer, Guillaume de Rossetti, were sent to help defend the castle. Arcano received a payment of £400 from Ralph Sadler.

Italian military engineers also served the Scots during this conflict, including Migliorino Ubaldini and Camillo Marini. Lorenzo Pomarelli of Siena worked for Mary of Guise during her regency. These other military architects do not seem to have had a background in the manufacture of cannon.
