= Thomas Lyon-Bowes =

Thomas Lyon-Bowes may refer to:

- Thomas Lyon-Bowes, 11th Earl of Strathmore and Kinghorne (1773–1846), Scottish nobleman and peer
- Thomas Lyon-Bowes, Master of Glamis (born 1821) (1821–1821)
- Thomas Lyon-Bowes, 12th Earl of Strathmore and Kinghorne (1822–1865), Scottish peer and cricketer

== See also ==
- Thomas Bowes (disambiguation)
- Thomas Lyon (disambiguation)
