= A Kestrel for a Knave =

1968 novel by Barry Hines

- First edition
- Author: Barry Hines
- Language: English; Yorkshire dialect
- Genre: Social realism
- Set in: South Yorkshire, 1960s
- Publisher: Michael Joseph
- Publication date: 1968
- Publication place: England
- Media type: Print
- Pages: 160
- ISBN: 0-14-00-2952-4
- Dewey Decimal: 823.914
- LC Class: PZ4 .H6628

A Kestrel for a Knave is a novel by English author Barry Hines, published in 1968. Set in Barnsley England, the book follows Billy Casper, a young working-class boy troubled at home and at school, who finds and trains a kestrel whom he names "Kes".

The book received a wider audience when it was adapted into the film Kes in 1969; Hines wrote the screenplay with director Ken Loach (credited as Kenneth Loach) and producer Tony Garnett. The film adaptation has since become regarded as one of the greatest of British films.

Today, the novel is often used in Key Stage 4 assessment in the United Kingdom, as part of GCSE English courses. The novel's title is taken from a poem found in the Book of Saint Albans. In medieval England, the only bird a knave (male servant, or man of low class) was legally allowed to keep was a kestrel.

== Plot ==
South Yorkshire, the 1960s. In the opening pages of the book, we see 15 year old Billy and his older half-brother Jud sleeping in the same bed in a troubled household. Billy tries to encourage Jud to get up to go to work, but Jud only responds by punching him. Soon afterwards, Billy attempts to leave for his paper round, only to discover that Jud has stolen his bicycle. As a result, Billy is late and has to deliver the newspapers on foot.

There is a flashback to several months before, when Billy returns home to find a man whom he does not recognise leaving his house. He asks his mother and finds out he is a man she had come home with the night before. It becomes obvious that Billy's father is absent. His mother then tells him to go to the shop to get some cigarettes, but he instead steals a book from the local bookshop and returns home to read it. Jud comes back drunk from a night out. Still in flashback, the next scene takes place at a farm. Billy sees a kestrel's nest and approaches it. Billy is then approached by the farmer and his daughter. At first, the farmer tells Billy to "bugger off" but when he realises that Billy was looking for a kestrel, he soon takes an interest. The flashback ends.

Later on in the day, Billy is at school, where Mr Crossley is taking the register. After the name Fisher, Billy shouts out 'German Bight', inadvertently causing the teacher to make a mistake. The class then proceeds to the hall for an assembly run by the strict head teacher, Mr Gryce. During the Lord's Prayer, Billy starts to daydream, and after the prayer has finished, Billy remains standing after the rest of the people in the hall have sat down. Billy is told to report to Gryce's room after assembly. Billy goes to Gryce and gets caned. He then goes to a class with Mr Farthing, who is discussing 'Fact and Fiction'. One of the pupils, Anderson, tells a story about tadpoles. Then Billy is told to tell a story, and tells a story about his kestrel. Mr Farthing takes an interest. The class then has to write a tall story, and Billy writes about a day when his father comes back home and Jud leaves to join the army. After the lesson, Billy gets into a fight with a boy called MacDowall which is eventually broken up, and is warned by Mr. Farthing.

After the break, Billy goes to physical education (PE) with Mr. Sugden. Billy does not have PE kit because his mother refuses to pay for it, so he is forced to wear clothes that do not fit him instead. He goes onto the football pitch and is told to play in goal. After a very long lesson, which involves Billy performing acrobatics on the goalpost, the class goes back inside and each takes a shower. After Billy intentionally lets in the winning goal to end the lesson, he is humiliated by Mr. Sugden, who forces him to take a cold shower. After this, Billy goes straight home to feed Kes. He takes her out and flies her, and is approached by Mr. Farthing, who is apparently impressed by Billy's skill. Mr. Farthing then leaves, and Billy goes out to place Jud's bet. He finds out that the horse that Jud intends to bet on is unlikely to win, and instead uses Jud's money to buy a portion of fish and chips and some meat for the kestrel.

Billy returns to school, and whilst sitting in a maths lesson, sees Jud walking towards the school. The lesson finishes, and Billy leaves hurriedly. He tries to hide from Jud and falls asleep before he bumps into Gryce, who reminds him that he is supposed to be in a Youth Employment Meeting. Billy goes along to his Youth Employment Meeting, and the Youth Employment Officer finds it very difficult to recommend anything, as Billy claims that he has no hobbies. After the Youth Employment Meeting, Billy goes straight home and finds that Kes has disappeared. He frantically searches for her and returns home. Jud is there, and he tells Billy that the horse he was supposed to place a bet on won and that he has killed Kes. Billy then calls Jud a "fuckin' bastard" and has a fight with him. His mother criticises Billy's language, and Billy runs away. Another flashback takes place in which Billy visits the cinema with his father. When they return home, Billy's father finds that his wife has been having an affair with Billy's 'Uncle Mick'. Billy's father punches Mick and leaves the house. After the flashback has ended, Billy returns home, buries the kestrel and goes to bed.

The story is set in only one day, apart from the flashback passages. The film version, directed by Ken Loach from Barry Hines's screenplay, dispenses with the flashbacks and portrays the events in a linear fashion.

== Background ==
Barry Hines had published his debut novel, The Blinder, in 1966, while still working full-time as a P.E. teacher. Hines wanted to write a novel about the education system and took inspiration from his younger brother Richard, who had tamed a hawk called Kes. He wrote a first draft while teaching, but received a bursary from the BBC as a result of his successful radio play Billy's Last Stand, which he used to take a sabbatical on the Isle of Elba and complete the novel.

Film and television producer Tony Garnett approached Hines about the prospect of contributing an episode to The Wednesday Play series. Hines turned down the offer due to the novel he was currently working on, but Garnett was intrigued and asked Hines to send him a manuscript of the finished project. Impressed by the manuscript, Garnett and Loach bought the rights to the film for their new production company, Kestrel Films, before the novel had been published. Disney later attempted to buy the rights on the condition that the ending be changed from the novel so that the kestrel survives, a condition refused by Hines.

== Reception and legacy ==
A Kestrel for a Knave received positive critical reviews upon its original publication. Penelope Maslin noted Hines's "extraordinary visual sense ... subtlety and economy, added to an imagination quite out of the ordinary, which make A Kestrel for a Knave a book to remember."

In 2009, The Observer listed it as one of the "1,000 novels everyone must read", describing it as a "compelling and haunting portrait of British working-class youth". In a 2010 retrospective review, Imogen Carter acclaimed "the novel's dazzling natural imagery, reminiscent of Seamus Heaney's 1966 poetry collection, Death of a Naturalist".

Upon Hines's death in 2016, Barnsley-based poet Ian McMillan praised the novel for its "celebratory" presentation of the local dialect and culture, writing that "here in the former South Yorkshire coalfield A Kestrel for a Knave is our Moby-Dick, our Things Fall Apart, our Great Gatsby."

The book has been published around the world and translated into German, Chinese, Japanese and Russian. It was republished as a Penguin Modern Classic in 1999.

Alongside the film adaptation, it has seen adaptations for the stage and radio. A ballet adaptation was performed at Sheffield's Crucible Theatre in 2014 to critical acclaim.

First introduced to the UK syllabus in the 1970s, the book is often taught on GCSE English Literature courses.

In 2019, comedian and former teacher Greg Davies presented a BBC Four documentary about Hines, Looking for Kes, in which he travelled to Hines's hometown to interview people who knew the author.
