= Bob Bowes =

British actor (1922–1979)

Robert William Bowes (19 November 1922 – 1 December 1979) was a British actor and teacher whose only film role was as headmaster Mr Gryce in the 1969 adaptation of Barry Hines' book "A Kestrel for a Knave".

== Kes (1969) ==
Bowes' only film appearance is in Ken Loach's 1969 film Kes. Bob Bowes played the headmaster Mr Gryce in the adaptation of Barry Hines' novel "A Kestrel for a Knave", in which a teenage boy from Barnsley, Yorkshire, Billy Casper, finds and trains a young kestrel and in doing so develops a sense of self-respect and discovers his individuality.

The character of Gryce (known behind his back as "Gryce pudding" to his pupils) is a severe, perfunctory, abrupt and abusive headmaster. He appears constantly in a temper, and does not listen, inflicting corporal punishment even on a boy who has simply been sent to convey a message to him by another teacher, because he wasn't allowed by Gryce the opportunity to explain that he had been forced by the other boys to hide the cigarettes found on him, and on another he'd refused to believe was innocent of deliberately coughing in assembly. He is contrasted to the pastoral approach shown by the teacher Mr Farthing – portrayed in the film by Colin Welland, he shows no interest in Billy as a pupil or faith in him as a future member of society ("heaven help your future employer"), and regards the young people of the school as being of little worth. At a time when grammar schools were considered superior, the character of Gryce, head of a secondary modern school, emerges as a frustrated and rather pathetic character. One critic has described Bowes' portrayal of him as "comically vicious...a twentieth-century update of Wackford Squeers, the appalling Yorkshire headmaster of Dotheboys Hall in Nicholas Nickleby", and in subsequent performances of the play actors playing Gryce have tended to remain close to presentation of the character by Bowes.

== Biography ==
Bob Bowes' employment on the film "Kes" reflected Ken Loach's tendency to utilize ordinary people in roles to which they were suited, rather than relying solely upon professional actors. It is not clear as to whether Bowes was an acquaintance of either Loach or of Barry Hines, the author of the book A Kestrel for a Knave who also jointly wrote the film's script and was a former teacher. Bowes was in fact Headmaster of Ashton Road Secondary Modern School, Ashton Road, Castleford, (now known as Henry Moore Middle School) during the middle to late 1960s. Bob was the eldest of seven children to William and Mary Bowes. Born in Durham, Bob later moved to Rossington, Doncaster, when his father was working at Rossington Colliery. Mary worked at the Rossington Hypodrome playing the piano to the movies. Bob became a teacher, married Joyce, and had one child, Andrew, who, following in his father's footsteps, also became a teacher, working at Rossington Hall Special Education School.

Bowes died on 1 December 1979, at the age of 57.

== Filmography ==
| Year | Title | Role |
|---|---|---|
| 1969 | Kes | Mr. Gryce |
