= Athersley =

Village in South Yorkshire, England

Coordinates: 53.5796°N 1.4804°W

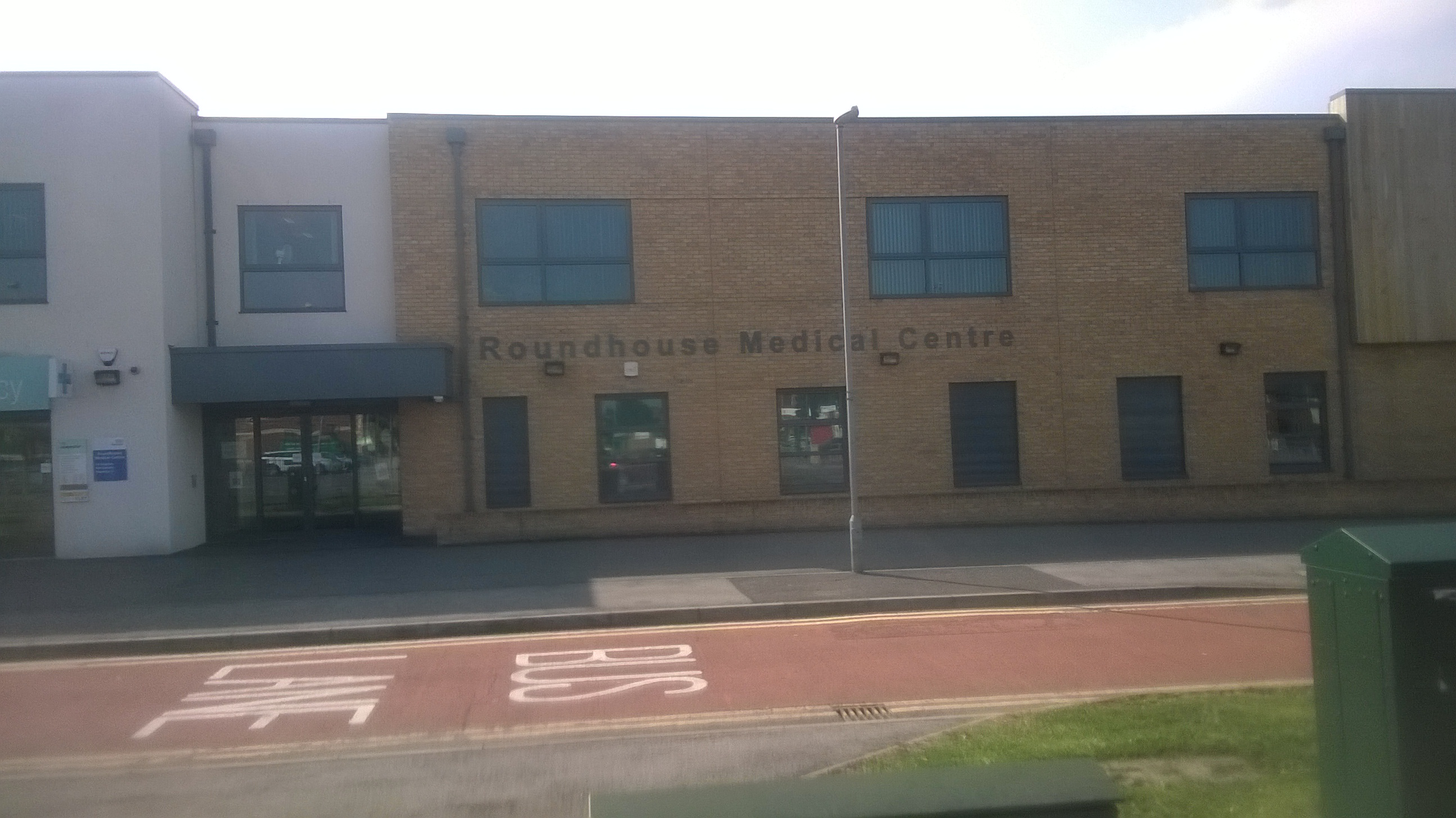
- Roundhouse Medical Centre in Athersley

- Location within South Yorkshire
- Population: 3,000 (2001)
- OS grid reference: SE345093
  - London: 150 mi (240 km) SE
- Metropolitan borough: Barnsley
- Metropolitan county: South Yorkshire
- Region: Yorkshire and the Humber
- Country: England
- Sovereign state: United Kingdom
- Post town: BARNSLEY
- Postcode district: S71
- Dialling code: 01226
- Police: South Yorkshire
- Fire: South Yorkshire
- Ambulance: Yorkshire
- UK Parliament: Barnsley North

Athersley is a village in the metropolitan borough of Barnsley, South Yorkshire, England.

== History ==
The site now occupied by the estate was once farmland and woodland. A large area from Lee Lane was known as Athersley Wood, which stretched nearly to Carlton Hill. The name was first recorded in 1379 as 'Hattirslay', probably meaning 'Aethred's forest glade' from the Old English 'Aethe[l]red' and 'leah'.

Construction began in post war Britain, near the end of the 1940s, under the direction of the then Building Administrator. The land, originally dense woodland populated by a variety of wildlife, proved difficult to prepare, yet the need for more housing gave rise to an influx of labourers, many of whom stayed on in the houses they helped to build. This undertaking was instrumental in the decision to build more homes around the region, including 'Phase 2' of Athersley, which was later to become known as Athersley North. North and South are separated by a main B road, Laithes Lane. The adjoining estate of New Lodge is separated by Wakefield Road from Athersley North yet other estates surrounding the area have no noticeable separation, most notably Smithies and Monk Bretton.

Although woodland was cleared to make way for construction, remnants remain throughout the surrounding area, home to diverse wildlife, and ponds and creeks. Some of these areas are sanctuaries for the local wildlife, most recently Carlton Marshes, a lake or pond preserving water creatures and birds. This area was once home to Wharncliffe Woodmoor Colliery.

== Community ==
The area is served by four primary schools, Holy Trinity Catholic and Church of England School (ages 3–16), Athersley North Primary School, Athersley South Primary School and Laithes Primary School. The local secondary schools are Holy Trinity Catholic and Church of England School (ages 3–16) and Outwood Academy Carlton,

The area is served by a variety of shops, many of which are located at the top of Laithes Lane at its junction with Wakefield Road. Shops include Poundstretcher and Co-op stores, cafes, bakers, butchers, a pet store, an alcohol retailer, and a barbers. There is a social club and a working men's club.
