= Elizabeth Bowes =

English Protestant exile

Elizabeth Aske
- Born: 1505
- Died: 1572 (aged 66–67)
- Spouse: Richard Bowes
- Issue: Ralph Bowes; Francis Bowes; Sir George Bowes; Christopher Bowes; Robert Bowes; Bridget Bowes; Anne Bowes; Muriel Bowes; Margery Bowes; Elizabeth Bowes; Margaret Bowes; Jane Bowes
- Father: Roger Aske
- Mother: Margery Sedgwick

Elizabeth Bowes (née Aske; 1505 – c. 1572) was an English Protestant exile, and a follower of John Knox, her son-in-law.

== Life ==
Elizabeth Aske, baptized in August 1505, was the granddaughter of William Aske (d. 23 August 1512) and Felice Strangeways, and the daughter of Roger Aske (d. before 1510/11), esquire, of Aske, North Yorkshire, by Margery Sedgwick, the daughter of Humphrey Sedgwick of Walbrun, Yorkshire.

While they were still children, she and her sister Anne were coheiresses to their father, mother and grandfather. Their wardships were sold in 1510 to her future husband's father, Sir Ralph Bowes (d. 1482) of Streatlam. Anne Aske married Ralph Bulmer., and in 1521 Elizabeth Aske was betrothed to her guardian's youngest son, Richard Bowes (c. 1497–1558), to whom the King granted special livery of half the lands of William Aske, to be received at his marriage. Richard Bowes, like the rest of his family, was engaged in border business, but seems to have lived chiefly at Aske.

In 1548 Richard Bowes was made captain of Norham. His wife and family followed him northwards and lived in Berwick. Elizabeth, religious and much affected by the Protestant Reformation, met John Knox, who was living at Berwick in 1549. Knox wished to marry Elizabeth's daughter, Margery Bowes, but Richard Bowes' family pride was hurt by Knox's offer, and he refused his consent. Nonetheless, Knox, who was about the same age as Elizabeth, contracted himself to Margery, and in July 1553 they were married in spite of opposition from Margery's family. At this time Knox's fortunes were at a low ebb, and Queen Mary had just ascended the throne. His letters to Elizabeth were intercepted by spies, and in January 1554 he left England.

In June 1556 Elizabeth and Margery joined Knox at Geneva, where two sons were born to Margery and her husband. Knox left Geneva for Scotland in 1559, followed shortly afterwards by his wife. After a short stay in England, where Elizabeth I was now Queen, Elizabeth Bowes too made her way to her son-in-law, who wrote for the Queen's permission for her journey. In 1560 Margery died, but her mother still stayed near Knox, leaving her own family. She died about 1572, and after her death Knox gave an account of the relationship in the Advertisement to his Answer to a Letter of a Jesuit named Tyrie (1572), published a letter to Elizabeth, dealing with her troubled conscience.

== Marriage and issue ==
She married Richard Bowes (d. 10 November 1558), esquire, by whom she had five sons and seven daughters:

- Ralph Bowes.
- Francis Bowes.
- Sir George Bowes (d. 20 August 1580).
- Christopher Bowes.
- Robert Bowes.
- Bridget Bowes, who married Thomas Hussey, esquire.
- Anne Bowes, who married Marmaduke Vincent, esquire.
- Muriel Bowes, who married John Jackson.
- Marjorie/Margery Bowes, who married the Scottish reformer John Knox.
- Elizabeth Bowes, who married George Bainbrigge.
- Margaret Bowes, who married firstly Thomas Middleton and secondly Ambrose Birkbeck.
- Jane Bowes.
