= Mark Bowes =

Scottish footballer (born 1973)

Personal information
- Date of birth: 17 February 1973 (age 53)
- Place of birth: Bangour, Scotland
- Position: Right back

Youth career
- Gairdoch United

Senior career*
Years	Team	Apps	(Gls)
1991–1995	Dunfermline Athletic	31	(0)
1995–1999	Forfar Athletic	62	(3)
- Bathgate Thistle

International career
1992	Scotland U21	1	(0)
- * Club domestic league appearances and goals

Mark Bowes (born 17 February 1973) is a Scottish former professional footballer who played for Dunfermline Athletic and Forfar Athletic in the Scottish Football League.
