= Innes Review =

- Discipline: Religious Studies
- Language: English

Publication details
- History: 1950–present
- Publisher: Edinburgh University Press (Scotland)
- Frequency: Biannual

Standard abbreviations
- ISO 4: Innes Rev.

Indexing
- ISSN: 0020-157X (print); 1745-5219 (web)
- OCLC no.: 60623671

Links
- Journal homepage; Scottish Catholic Historical Association

The Innes Review is a biannual academic journal, published by Edinburgh University Press on behalf of the Scottish Catholic Historical Association in May and November of each year. It was founded in 1950 and covers the part played by the Catholic Church in Scottish history. It includes all aspects of Scottish history and culture, especially ones related to religious history.

The journal is named after Thomas Innes.
