= Carlton, South Yorkshire =

Village in South Yorkshire, England

Coordinates: 53.5873°N 1.4491°W

Carlton
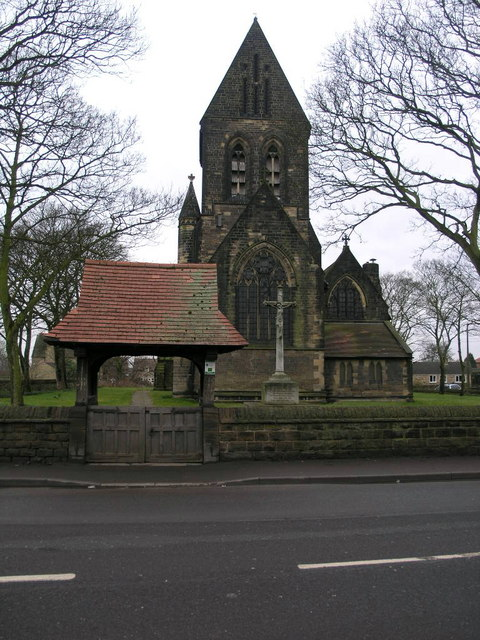
- The church of St John the Evangelist

- Location within South Yorkshire
- OS grid reference: SE365102
- Metropolitan borough: Barnsley
- Metropolitan county: South Yorkshire
- Region: Yorkshire and the Humber
- Country: England
- Sovereign state: United Kingdom
- Post town: BARNSLEY
- Postcode district: S71
- Dialling code: 01226
- Police: South Yorkshire
- Fire: South Yorkshire
- Ambulance: Yorkshire
- UK Parliament: Barnsley North

Carlton is a village in the Metropolitan Borough of Barnsley in South Yorkshire, England. It is situated between the villages of Athersley and Royston. The village is split into two parts, one half in the Monk Bretton ward and the rest in the Royston ward of the Barnsley MBC. It was built up on coking and coal mining industries and now has one of the largest industrial estates within the surrounding area. In the industrial estate lies a glass recycling plant, called Rexam. To its east stands the Mr Kipling cake factory, owned by Premier Foods. Until 1974 it was in the West Riding of Yorkshire.

Carlton has two Church of England churches and a Methodist chapel, which is now private housing. A Kingdom Hall of Jehovah's Witnesses serves both the Carlton and Athersley congregations.

An ancient sacred spring or holy well existed near to the modern-day Carlton Road and became associated with St Helen in early Christian times. The name St Helen's was used for a 20th-century secondary school near the site of the old well, which merged with the original Edward Sheerien School in 1992 (the new Edward Sheerian School merged with Royston High in 2009 to form Carlton Community College). The school is now known as Outwood Academy Carlton, after gaining academy status in 2016 following a report from OFSTED placing the school in special measures.

Carlton has its own village group, www.carltonvillage.co.uk, that is accessible to all villagers. Carlton also has a junior football team called the Bridge Tigers, which has teams ranging from u-7s to u-15s playing at Carlton park.

== History ==
Carlton was formerly a township in the parish of Roystone, in 1866 Carlton became a separate civil parish, on 1 April 1938 the parish was abolished and merged with Barnsley and Royston. In 1931 the parish had a population of 2317. It is now in the unparished area of Barnsley.

== Bakery manufacturing site ==
A £11m cake factory was built by Woodall-Duckham in 1972 for Lyons Bakery, which became Lyons Cakes in 1990. Construction started in May 1972.

In 1980 Lyons Cakes had 16% of cake sales; Mr Kipling had 20%. In 1982 the site had 1,200 workers, and in 1994. In 1983 the headquarters of Lyons Bakery moved to the site. In 1984 the factory produced a quarter of the manufactured cakes eaten in Britain.

Manor Bakeries was headquartered at West Byfleet in Surrey. The site was taken over by Manor Bakeries in February 1995, with Lyons Cakes bought for £35m.

== See also ==
- Listed buildings in Royston, South Yorkshire
