= Holy Trinity Catholic and Church of England School =

Location
- Carlton Road; Barnsley, South Yorkshire, S71 2LF; England; 53.57838°N 1.45854°W

Information
- Type: Academy
- Religious affiliations: Roman Catholic & Church of England
- Established: 2012
- Local authority: Barnsley
- Trust: Hallam Schools Partnership Academy Trust
- Department for Education URN: 144606 Tables
- Ofsted: Reports
- Headteacher: Lissa Oldcorn
- Gender: Coeducational
- Age: 3 to 16
- Enrolment: 1127
- Capacity: 1120
- Houses: Barachiel, Gabriel, Raphael, Uriel and Zadkiel, A, N, G, E, L, S for Y8 Students
- Colours: Purple; Dark Green; Light Green; Gold; Navy Blue
- Website: www.holytrinity.org

Holy Trinity Catholic and Church of England School is a coeducational all-through school for pupils aged from 3 to 16. The school is under the joint jurisdiction of the Roman Catholic Diocese of Hallam and the Church of England Diocese of Leeds. The school is located in Carlton Road, Barnsley, South Yorkshire, England. Holy Trinity is the only purpose built 3-16 Catholic and Church of England school in the country.

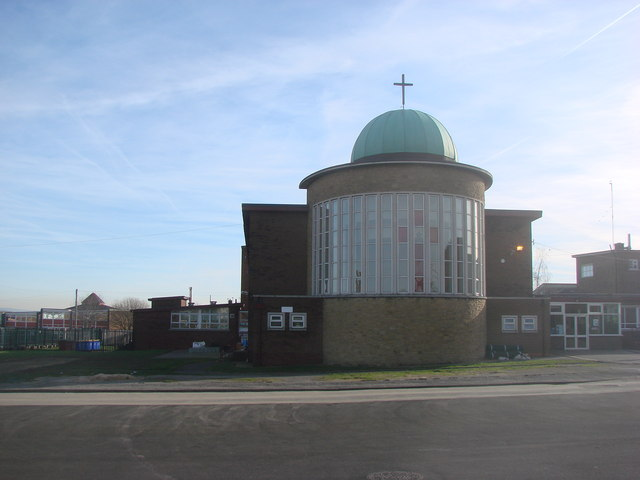
Former St Michaels Catholic and Church of England High School

The school was formed in 2012 from the merger of St Michaels Catholic and Church of England High School, Holy Cross Deanery Church of England Primary School and St Dominic's Catholic Primary School. The school opened in a new building on land adjacent to the old High School site.

Simon Barber was the headteacher of Holy Trinity at its opening. He left on 15 July 2016, leaving the school to be run by deputy headteacher Anna Dickson, for Academic Year 2016–17. Dickson was then appointed as headteacher. She retired in August 2020.

After a critical Ofsted inspection, in January 2017 the school was put into in special measures. This led to the school being converted into an academy in May 2018. It is part of the St Claire Catholic multi-academy trust.

In September 2020 Lissa Oldcorn was appointed acting headteacher. In February 2022 she was appointed as permanent headteacher.

As Cllr Otis Stated This School does not allow people to go to the toilet without a toilet pass which is against the Law
