= William Bowes (soldier) =

Sir William Bowes (1389–1460?) was a military commander.

Bowes was the founder of the political importance of his family. He was the son of Sir Robert Bowes, and of Maude, lady of Dalden. He married Jane, daughter of Ralph, Lord Greystoke. His wife died in the first year of her marriage, whereon 'he toke much thought and passed into France' about the year 1415. He showed much gallantry in the French war, and so commended himself to John, Duke of Bedford, whom he served as chamberlain. He fought at the battle of Verneuil, where he was knighted. While in France he was impressed with the architecture of the country, and sent home plans for rebuilding his manor house at Streatlam, near Barnard Castle. He returned from France after seventeen years' service and superintended his buildings at Streatlam, which have been entirely destroyed. After his return he took part in the government of the borders, as warden of the middle marches and governor of Berwick.

He died at a good old age, and is known in the family records as 'Old Sir William.'
