= George Bowes (rebel) =

English commander in border warfare

Sir George Bowes (1517–1545) was an English commander in border warfare. He was knighted for his services during the Burning of Edinburgh (1544).

== Early life ==
Bowes was the son of Sir Ralph Bowes of Dalden, Streatlam, and South Cowton, and Elizabeth, daughter of Henry Clifford, 10th Baron de Clifford. He married Muriel the daughter of Lord Eure.

== In the "Rough Wooing" ==
From a young age, Bowes took part in border warfare against Scotland. At the start of the war of the Rough Wooing, he went with Lord Hertford and participated in the devastating raid on Edinburgh in 1544, and was knighted at Leith on 11 May.

In June 1544 an English force led by George Bowes, John Widdrington, Henry Eure (a son of William Eure), and Lionel Grey besieged Coldingham Priory and burnt the claustral buildings.

Bowes retook Coldingham Priory in November 1544, after a discussion if local men could be "assured". William Eure sent George Bowes and the Italian military engineer Archangelo Arcano to set up a fort at Coldingham. George Bowes was made the "petty-captain" with 100 men, and some gunners from the Berwick garrison, and ten Irish arquebusiers.

== Rebellion and death ==
In November 1544 Bowes seized Coldingham Priory. This act of rebellion worked temporarily in his favour. The English Privy Council announced to the Earl of Shrewsbury who was the Lieutenant-General in the North, that it was Henry VIII's intention to confer on him a barony. Bowes, however was then taken prisoner, early in 1545, and the barony was not granted.

Bowes returned from Scotland, and died at the end of 1545 in Alnwick, leaving no male heir.
