= Thomas Bowes (translator) =

English translator

Thomas Bowes (fl. 1586) was an English translator.

Bowes was educated at Clare College, Cambridge, graduating BA in 1579–80 and MA in 1583. He translated into English the first and second parts of the French Academy, a moral and philosophical treatise written by Peter of Primaudaye, a French writer of the late-16th century. The translation of the first part was published in 1586; it seemed to have met with immediate popularity, for a fifth edition was issued in 1614. Along with the third edition in 1594 was published the translation of the second part. To both parts, Bowes prefixes a letter to the reader; in the longer of the two (prefixed to the second part), J. Payne Collier detects allusions to Marlowe, Greene and Nash. The allusion to Marlowe can scarcely be maintained if the second part appeared for the first time in the 1594 edition; Marlowe (if indeed he is meant) is alluded to as living but he died in 1593. Bowes denounced the prevalence of atheistic and licentious literature; after giving as an example Ligneroles (a French atheist), he goes on to quote from anonymous English imitators. He concludes by denouncing scurrilous romances about Arthur and Huon of Bordeaux. Collier, in the Poetical Decameron, discusses the whole passage. There is an edition of the third part of the Academy, translated into English by R. Dolman and published in 1601.
