= George Bowes (soldier) =

English military commander

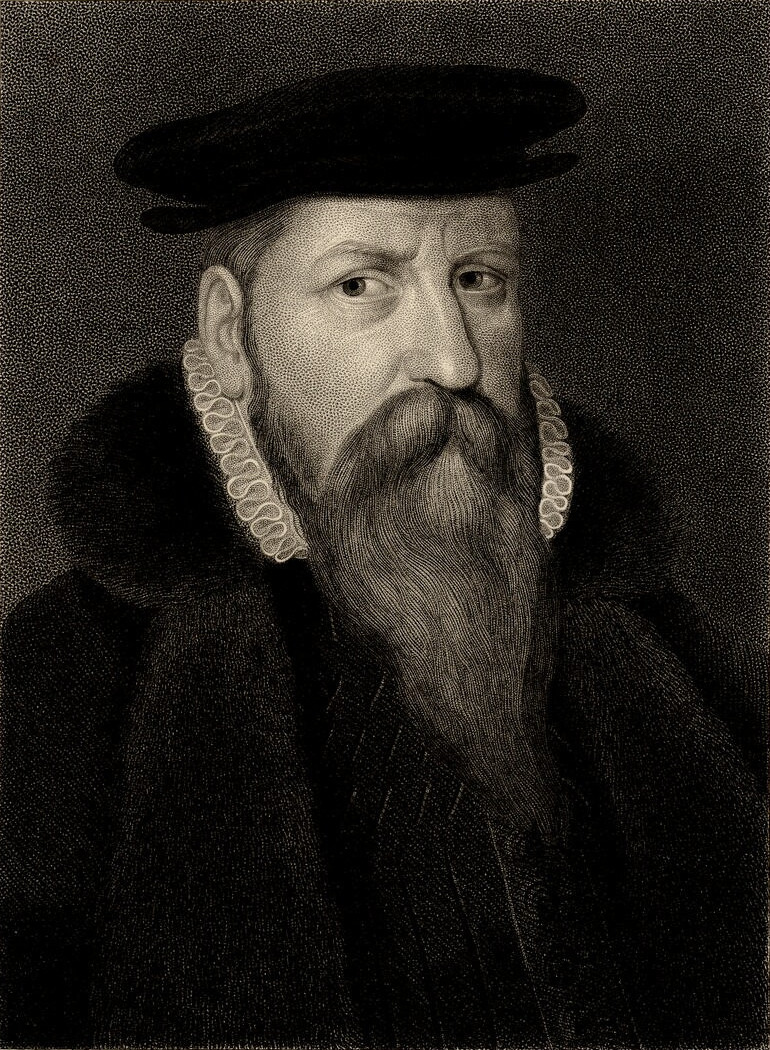
- Died: 20 August 1580; Streatlam
- Buried: Barnard Castle
- Spouses: Dorothy Mallory; Jane Talbot
- Issue: Sir William Bowes six other children
- Father: Richard Bowes
- Mother: Elizabeth Aske

Sir George Bowes (1527 – 20 August 1580) was an English military commander.

== Family ==
George Bowes was the third but eldest surviving son of Richard Bowes (d. 10 November 1558) and Elizabeth Aske. He had four brothers, Ralph, Francis, Christopher and Robert Bowes, and seven sisters: Bridget, who married Thomas Hussey, esquire; Anne, who married Marmaduke Vincent, esquire; Muriel, who married John Jackson; Margery, who married the Scottish reformer John Knox; Elizabeth, who married George Bainbrigge; Margaret, who married firstly Thomas Middleton and secondly Ambrose Birkbeck; and Jane.

== Career ==
At the age of fourteen he was married to Dorothy, daughter of Sir William Mallory of Studley Royal. He early went to the Scottish war, and in 1549 is mentioned as being in command of one hundred cavalry at Douglas. In 1558 he was made Marshal of Berwick-upon-Tweed, and William Ingleby of Ripley was made treasurer of Berwick. Ingleby was married to Anne Mallory. By then a widower, Bowes strengthened his position by an alliance with the powerful house of Shrewsbury, when he married Jane, daughter of Sir John Talbot of Albrighton.

His opinion was often asked by the government about border affairs. In April 1560 he was knighted at Berwick by the Duke of Norfolk, who noted that his landed income of 600 marks a year suited his new status. Soon afterwards he resigned as Marshal of Berwick and retired to his house at Streatlam Castle. In 1568 he was employed to escort Mary, Queen of Scots, from Carlisle to Bolton Castle, a duty he carried out courteously; Mary in later years wrote to him as to a friend.

In 1569 the Rebellion of the Northern Earls threatened Elizabeth's throne, and he played a major part as a loyalist, remaining at Streatlam and facing down unpopularity. Streatlam was not far from Brancepeth, the seat of Charles Neville, 6th Earl of Westmorland, who was the centre of the disaffected party. On 7 March, Henry Carey, 1st Baron Hunsdon wrote, "The country is in great hatred of Sir George Bowes so as he dare scant remain there". Bowes kept watch on all that was passing, and sent information to Thomas Radclyffe, 3rd Earl of Sussex, Lord President of the North, who was stationed at York.

The Earl of Sussex for some time did not believe that the rebellious earls would proceed to any open action. At length their proceedings were so threatening that Bowes on 12 November left Streatlam, and shut himself up in Barnard Castle, which belonged to the crown and of which he was steward, with forces levied for Queen Elizabeth and gentlemen of the neighbourhood. He wished to use this small force for the purpose of cutting off the rebels who were gathering at Brancepeth; but Sussex hesitated to give permission, and things were allowed to take their course. On 14 November the rebel Earls entered Durham, and advanced southwards for the purpose of releasing Queen Mary from her prison at Tutbury; but they did not agree internally, changed their plan suddenly, and retreated northwards. Bowes's house at Streatlam was destroyed, and Barnard Castle was besieged. Bowes held out for eleven days, but fearing treachery within he made a surrender on honourable terms, and marched out with four hundred men. He joined the Earl of Sussex and was appointed provost marshal of the army.

The royal army had marched northwards, and the rebels retreated and gradually dispersed. Elizabeth gave orders that severe punishment should be inflicted on the ringleaders. The executions were carried out by Bowes, as provost marshal, while the lists of those to be executed were drawn up Sussex, who commended Bowes to the queen. In 1572 he received some minor grants of forfeited lands, which appear to have been of small value. In 1571 he was elected M.P. for Knaresborough, and in 1572 for Morpeth. In 1576 he was made high sheriff of the county palatine of Durham.

In 1579 he relieved his brother Robert Bowes, who wished for a leave of absence from the post of marshal of Berwick-upon-Tweed. In June, Mary, Queen of Scots wrote to him from Sheffield Manor that she was sending her secretary Claude Nau to Scotland, and asked for his assistance and reminded him of his courtesy at Bolton. He was involved in acquiring a portrait of James VI painted at Stirling Castle. Some of his correspondence from this period survives. After staying at Berwick for nearly a year he begged to be relieved. Soon after his return to Streatlam he died, in 1580.

His heir was his eldest son by Dorothy Mallory, William Bowes. Another son George Bowes (d. 1606) was involved in prospecting for gold in Scotland. A daughter, Jane Bowes, married Timothy Hutton, a son of Matthew Hutton, Archbishop of York, in 1592.
