= The Baker Street Boys =

- Genre: Mystery
- Based on: Characters created by Arthur Conan Doyle
- Written by: Richard Carpenter; Anthony Read
- Directed by: Marilyn Fox; Michael Kerrigan
- Starring: Jay Simpson; Debbie Norris; Suzi Ross; Adam Woodyatt; David Garlick; Damion Napier; Roger Ostime; Hubert Rees; Stanley Lebor; Pat Keen
- Theme music composer: David Epps; Alan Roper
- Country of origin: United Kingdom
- Original language: English
- No. of series: 1
- No. of episodes: 8

Production
- Producers: Paul Stone; Anthony Gruner
- Running time: 25 mins
- Production company: BBC

Original release
- Network: BBC
- Release: 8 March – 1 April 1983

The Baker Street Boys is a British television series made by the BBC and first shown in 1983. The series recounts the adventures of a gang of street urchins living in Victorian London who assist the legendary detective Sherlock Holmes in solving crimes and find themselves tackling cases of their own.

== Production ==
Anthony Read planned out the show's format. Read had previously been a script editor and writer on the 1965 Sherlock Holmes series starring Douglas Wilmer. He claimed to have long wondered what the Irregulars got up to when not in the service of Sherlock Holmes and the series deals with this subject.

Although Holmes was always absent (explained on-screen by his being too busy working on another case, being held captive by Professor Moriarty, or confined to bed by illness), Dr. Watson was always around to assist the Irregulars when necessary.

Holmes was only ever seen obliquely (Roger Ostime provided the character's voice) while Dr. Watson, Inspector Lestrade and Mrs. Hudson all featured more prominently.

A year prior to playing Watson in this series, Hubert Rees has briefly appeared as Inspector Lestrade in a 1982 adaptation of The Hound of the Baskervilles. The part of Professor Moriarty was portrayed by Colin Jeavons, who would later go on to play Inspector Lestrade in the acclaimed Granada Television adaptation. Pat Keen, who played Mrs Hudson, would go on to play the same character in the 1988 spoof Without a Clue.

== Cast ==
=== Starring ===
- Jay Simpson as Wiggins
- Damion Napier as Beaver
- Adam Woodyatt as Shiner
- David Garlick as Sparrow
- Debbie Norris as Queenie
- Suzi Ross as Rosie

=== Recurring ===
- Roger Ostime as Sherlock Holmes (voice only)
- Hubert Rees as Dr. Watson
- Stanley Lebor as Inspector Lestrade
- Pat Keen as Mrs. Hudson
- Colin Jeavons as Professor James Moriarty
- Michael Godley as Colonel Moran

== Episodes ==
Eight episodes were broadcast:

#	Original airdate	Title
1	8 March 1983	"The Adventure of the Disappearing Dispatch Case, Part 1"
2	11 March 1983	"The Adventure of the Disappearing Dispatch Case, Part 2"
3	15 March 1983	"The Ghost of Julian Midwinter, Part 1"
4	18 March 1983	"The Ghost of Julian Midwinter, Part 2"
5	22 March 1983	"The Adventure of the Winged Scarab, Part 1"
6	25 March 1983	"The Adventure of the Winged Scarab, Part 2"
7	29 March 1983	"The Case of the Captive Clairvoyant, Part 1"
8	4 April 1983	"The Case of the Captive Clairvoyant, Part 2"

== VHS release ==
In 1985, the BBC released 4 episodes from the series on VHS video. They were edited into two 48-minute-long episodes.

The two stories featured were "The Adventure of the Disappearing Dispatch Case" (from Episodes 1 and 2) and "The Adventure of the Winged Scarab" (from Episodes 5 and 6).

== Books ==
Seven books based on the TV series have been published to date:

Title	Author	Date	Publisher	ISBN
The Baker Street Boys	Brian N. Ball	1983	BBC/Knight Books	ISBN 978-0-3403-3300-6
The Baker Street Boys: The Case of the Disappearing Detective	Anthony Read	2005	Walker Books Ltd	ISBN 978-1-84428-961-5
The Baker Street Boys: The Case of the Captive Clairvoyant	Anthony Read	2006	Walker Books Ltd	ISBN 978-0-7445-7016-8
The Baker Street Boys: The Case of the Ranjipur Ruby	Anthony Read	2006	Walker Books Ltd	ISBN 978-1-4063-0088-8
The Baker Street Boys: The Case of the Limehouse Laundry	Anthony Read	2007	Walker Books Ltd	ISBN 978-1-4063-0341-4
The Baker Street Boys: The Case of the Stolen Sparklers	Anthony Read	2008	Walker Books Ltd	ISBN 978-1-4063-0342-1
The Baker Street Boys: The Case of the Haunted Horrors	Anthony Read	2009	Walker Books Ltd	ISBN 978-1-4063-0343-8
The Baker Street Boys: The Case of the Racehorse Ringer	Anthony Read	2012	Walker Books Ltd	ISBN 978-1-4063-3524-8

== See also ==
- Baker Street Irregulars
- 221B Baker Street (video game)
