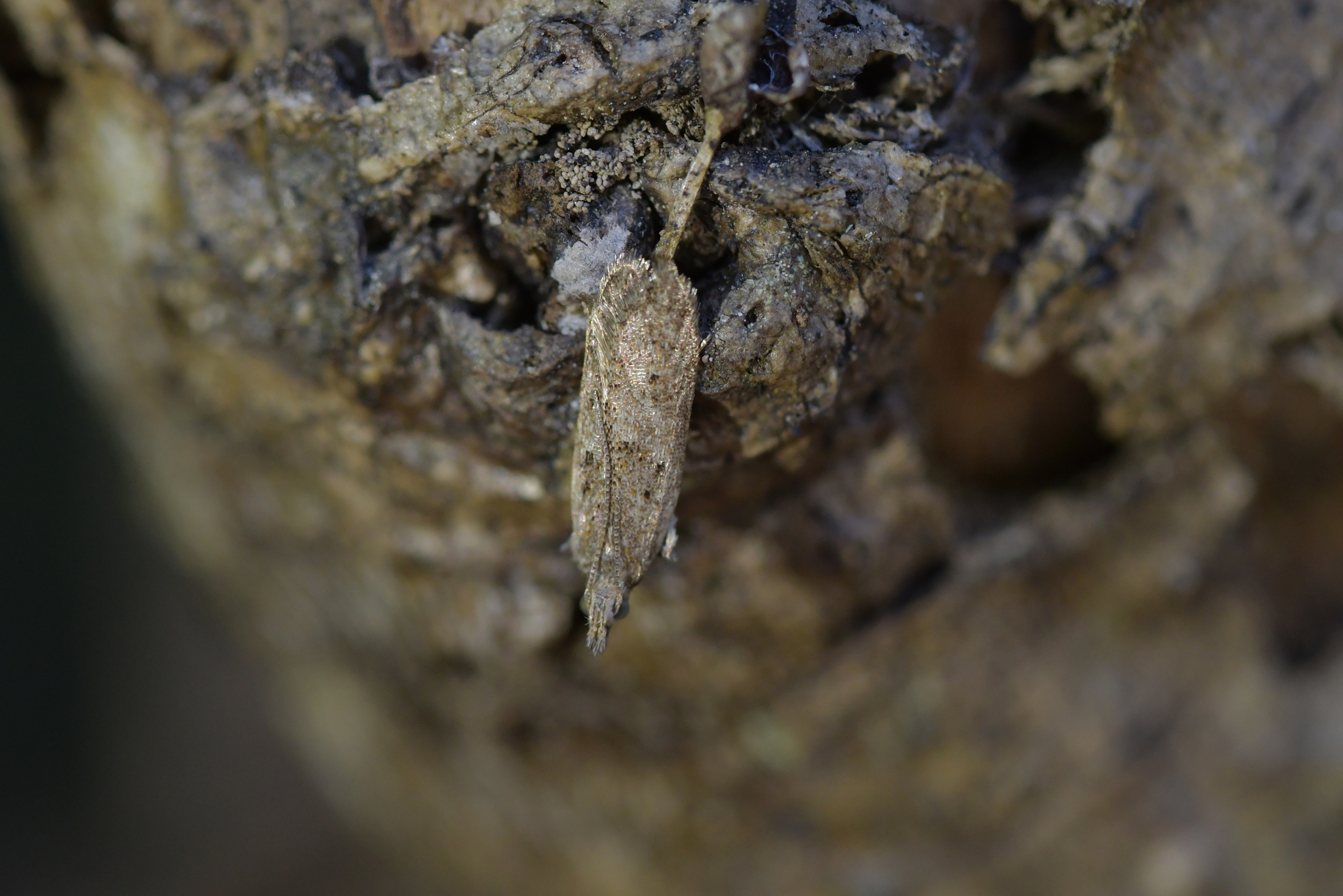

Scientific classification
- Kingdom: Animalia
- Phylum: Arthropoda
- Clade: Pancrustacea
- Class: Insecta
- Order: Lepidoptera
- Family: Oecophoridae
- Subfamily: Oecophorinae
- Genus: Thamnosara; Meyrick, 1883
- Species: T. sublitella

Binomial name
- Thamnosara sublitella (Walker, 1864)

Synonyms
- Gelechia sublitella Walker, 1864; Thamnosara chirista Meyrick, 1883

= Thamnosara =

Genus of moths

Thamnosara is a genus in the family Oecophorinae. This genus was first described by Edward Meyrick in 1883. Thamnosara contains only one species Thamnosara sublitella which is endemic to New Zealand. This species was first described by Francis Walker in 1864. It is endemic to New Zealand and has been observed on the North and the South Island as well as Stephens Island. T. sublitella inhabits dry native forest where its larvae feed on forest leaf litter. Adults are most commonly observed on the wing in November and December. The adults can be distinguished from similar appearing species as they have a tuft of long, stout, hair-like scales on the second joint of the labial palpi.

== Taxonomy ==
Thamnosara was first described by Edward Meyrick in 1883. Meyrick gave a more detailed description of the genus in 1884. The type species of this genus is Thamnosara chirista by original monotypy.

Francis Walker originally described T. sublitella in 1864 under the name Gelechia sublitella. In 1883 and again in 1884 in more detail, Meyrick, thinking he was describing a new species, named this moth Thamnosara chirista. In 1915 Meyrick placed G. sublitella into the genus Thamnosara and synonymised T. chirista into that name. In 1927 Alfred Philpott examined the male genitalia of T. sublitella. George Hudson discussed both the genus and species and illustrated T. sblitella in his 1928 book The butterflies and moths of New Zealand. The female holotype, collected in Auckland by Andrew Sinclair, is held at the Natural History Museum, London.

== Description ==
Illustration of male.

Live moth.

At rest.

Meyrick described this genus as follows:

Head with appressed scales, sidetufts moderate, loosely spreading. Antennae in male moderate, biserrate, moderately and evenly ciliated (1), basal joint rather long, without pecten. Palpi moderate, second joint not exceeding base of antennae, densely scaled, beneath with long projecting hairscales, forming a large square tuft, terminal joint slightly shorter than second, slender, curved. Thorax smooth. Forewings moderate, apex rounded, hindmargin oblique. Hindwings as broad as forewings, elongate-ovate, hindmargin rounded, cilia 4/5. Abdomen moderate. Posterior tibiae shortly rough-haired above. Forewings with vein 7 to costa, 2 from rather before angle of cell. Hindwings normal.

Meyrick stated that this genus is allied to Gymnobathra and that it has only one species that can be found in New Zealand.

Hudson described T. sublitella as follows:

The expansion of the wings is slightly over 1/2 inch. The fore-wings are elongate-oval, pale brown, irregularly speckled and mottled with pale reddish-brown; there are slender black marks in the disc at 1/3, near the middle, and beyond the middle; the costal edge is densely speckled with black towards the apex and the termen below the apex; the cilia are pale reddish-ochreous. The hind-wings are pale grey, the cilia pale greyish-ochreous mixed with darker grey. Sometimes the blackish speckling extends over most of the fore-wings leaving paler costal and diseal areas and some specimens are darker and greyer than others.

Hudson pointed out that tuft of long, stout, hair-like scales on the second joint of the labial palpi constitutes a significant feature of this moth especially when contrasted with the extremely slender terminal joint. This tuft is a distinguishing feature that can help ensure this species is recognised when comparing to the similar Izatha rigescens. T. sublitella can also be distinguished from I. rigescens as the outer third of T. sublitella's wing does not have dark streaks between the veins.

== Distribution ==
This species is endemic to New Zealand and has been observed on the North and South Islands as well as Stephens Island. It is regarded as being wide spread.

== Habitat and hosts ==
This species frequents dry forest clad hills. Larvae feed on forest leaf-litter. The larvae of T. sublitella can be distinguished from similar species as the larvae has two hairs on the subventral area of the first segment of the abdomen.

== Behaviour ==
Adults are most commonly observed on the wing in November and December. When the adult is at rest the wings are held closely closed, overlapping for more than half their length; the antennae are placed outside the wings along the mid back; the palpi-tufts project forwards, with the apical joint being recurved upwards.
