= Andrew Sinclair =

British novelist, historian, biographer, critic, and filmmaker (1935–2019)

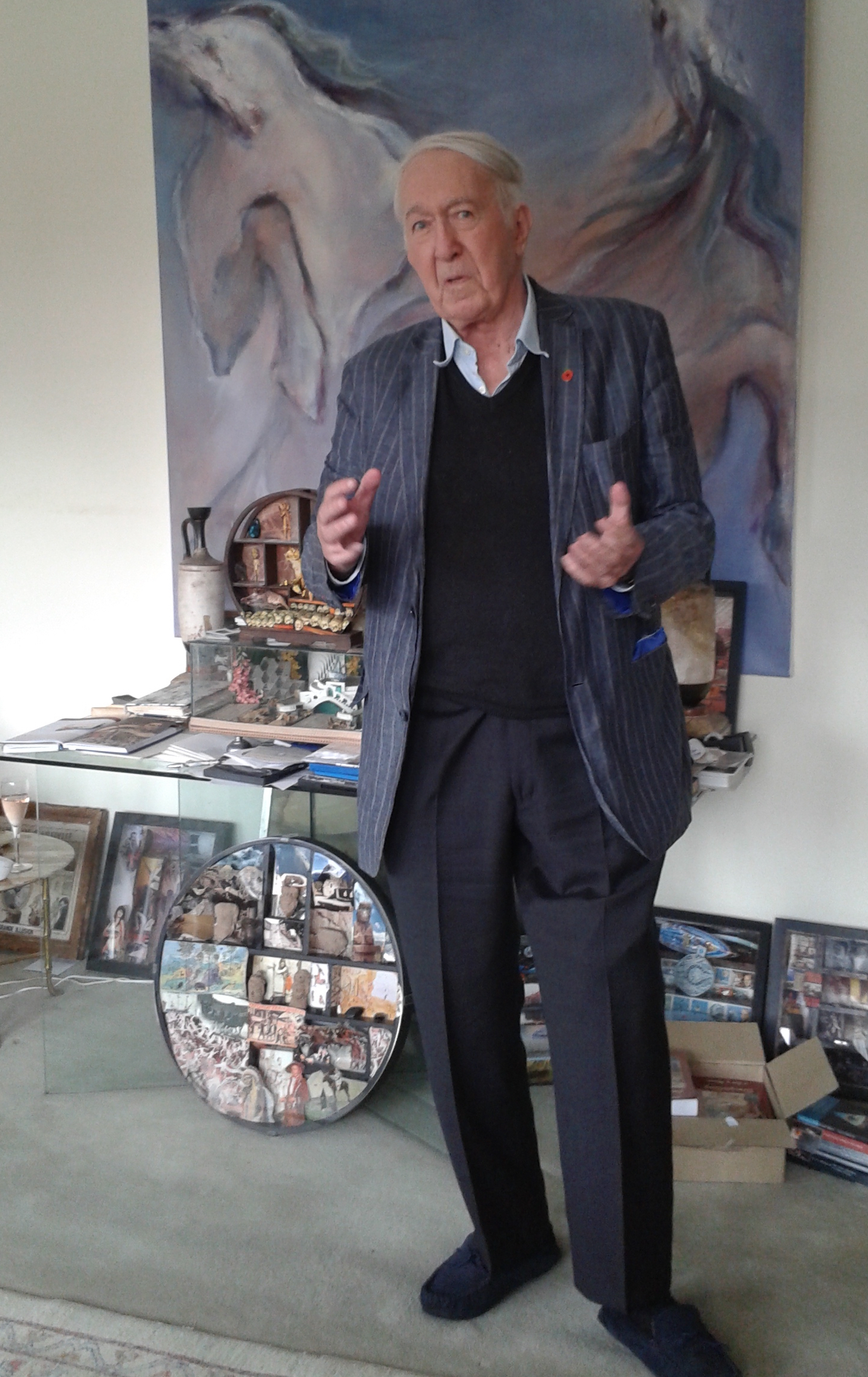
- Andrew Sinclair in 2018
- Born: Andrew Annandale Sinclair; 21 January 1935
- Died: 30 May 2019 (aged 84)
- Occupations: Novelist, historian, biographer, critic, filmmaker

Andrew Annandale Sinclair FRSL FRSA (21 January 1935 – 30 May 2019) was a British novelist, historian, biographer, critic, filmmaker, and a publisher of classic and modern film scripts. He has been described as a "writer of extraordinary fluency and copiousness, whether in fiction or in American social history".

== Early life and education ==
Born in Oxford in 1935, Sinclair was educated at Eton College and Trinity College, Cambridge, where he studied history and received a BA degree and a PhD. From 1959 to 1961 he was a Harkness Fellow at Harvard University.

== Writer and filmmaker ==
Before going up to Cambridge, Sinclair undertook his National Service as an Ensign with the Coldstream Guards and wrote a novel based on the experience, called The Breaking of Bumbo (1958). "At the age of 22, Andrew Sinclair woke up one morning to find himself, like Byron, suddenly famous". In 1959 Sinclair published his second novel My Friend Judas. It was reissued in 2009 by Faber Finds along with The Breaking of Bumbo.

Sinclair became the Managing Director of Timon Films in 1967. Three years later, in 1970, he adapted The Breaking of Bumbo for the big screen; it starred Joanna Lumley and was a critical failure. He then directed the film adaptation of Under Milk Wood (1971), now regarded as a classic, which featured Richard Burton as the narrator. His final film as a director was Blue Blood (1973), starring Oliver Reed.

Sinclair's book The Better Half: The Emancipation of the American Woman won the Somerset Maugham Prize in 1967. His biographies covered a wide variety of famous people: Che Guevara, Dylan Thomas, Jack London, John Ford, J Pierpont Morgan and Francis Bacon. He was elected a Fellow of the Royal Society of Literature in 1972. His most recent work was his autobiography, Storytelling: A Sort of Memoir (2018).

A critical assessment of Sinclair by Bernard Bergonzi began: "From the beginning Andrew Sinclair established himself as a writer of extraordinary fluency and copiousness, whether in fiction or in American social history".

== Historian ==
Sinclair was a founding member of Churchill College, Cambridge, and was Director of Historical Studies at the college between 1961 and 1963. Following a year spent as a Fellow at the American Council of Learned Societies, he returned to Britain to become a Lecturer in American History at University College London (UCL), working there from 1965 to 1967. His writings on persons and themes of American history are identified in his bibliography, below.

== Screenplay publisher ==
In 1966 Sinclair, together with the filmmaker Peter Whitehead, founded Lorrimer Publishing, which published the original screenplays of classic films. Sheridan Morley wrote: "Their format is a simple one: the script itself, with detailed descriptions where action takes over from the words, published with a brief introduction and sideline notes where necessary." Some 70 filmscripts were published, including The Blue Angel and The Third Man.

== Personal life ==
Andrew Sinclair married three times:

- firstly Marianne Alexandre in 1960 (later divorced) and had one son, Timon Alexandre Sinclair;
- secondly Miranda Seymour, daughter of George Fitzroy Seymour (cadet branch of Marquess of Hertford and Duke of Somerset of Thrumpton Hall) and Rosemary Nest Scott-Ellis, daughter of Thomas Evelyn Scott-Ellis, 8th Baron Howard de Walden (1880–1946), on 17 October 1972 (marriage dissolved 6 June 1984) and had one son Merlin George Sinclair;
- thirdly Sonia Melchett, widow of British Steel Corporation Chairman Julian Mond, 3rd Baron Melchett, on 25 July 1984, without issue.

As a result of his third marriage, Sinclair was the stepfather of Peter Mond, 4th Baron Melchett, politician and environmentalist, and Kerena Ann Mond and Pandora Mond, the artist.

In the 1960s Sinclair was instrumental in saving from demolition the historic buildings in Narrow Street, Limehouse. For his book The Last of the Best (1969), he was assisted by Jacquemine Charrott Lodwidge as researcher.

== Bibliography ==
=== Non-fiction ===
- Prohibition: The Era of Excess (1962)
- The Better Half: The Emancipation of the American Woman (1965)
- Selections from the Greek Anthology (Macmillan, 1967)
- A Concise History of the United States (1967, revised and updated 1999)
- Viva Che!: The Strange Death and Life of Che Guevara (1968, re-released 2006, Sutton ISBN 0-7509-4310-6)
- The Last of the Best: The Aristocracy of Europe in the Twentieth Century (1969)
- Guevara (Fontana Modern Masters, 1970)
- Dylan Thomas: Poet of His People (1975)
- Jack: A Biography of Jack London (1977)
- John Ford: a Biography (1979)
- Corsair: The Life of J Pierpont Morgan (1981)
- The Other Victoria (1985)
- The Red and the Blue: Cambridge, Treason and Intelligence (1986)
- War Like a Wasp: The Lost decade of the Forties (1989)
- The Sword and the Grail (Century, 1993)
- The Discovery of the Grail (Century, 1998)
- The Naked Savage (1991, London: Sinclair-Stevenson)
- Francis Bacon: His Life and Violent Times (1993)
- Arts and Cultures: The History of the Fifty Years of the Arts Council in Great Britain (1996
- Death by Fame: A Life of Elisabeth Empress of Austria (1998)
- Dylan the Bard: A Life of Dylan Thomas (1999, Constable; 2003, Robinson ISBN 1-84119-741-6)
- An Anatomy of Terror (Macmillan, 2003)
- Storytelling (Ashgrove Publishing, 2018)

=== Fiction ===
- The Breaking of Bumbo. London, Faber, and New York, Simon and Schuster, 1959; Penguin edition 1961 (cover by George Adamson).
- My Friend Judas. London, Faber, 1959; New York, Simon and Schuster, 1961.
- The Project. London, Faber, and New York, Simon and Schuster, 1960.
- The Hallelujah Bum. London, Faber, 1963; as The Paradise Bum, New York, Atheneum, 1963.
- The Raker. London, Cape, and New York, Atheneum, 1964; Valancourt Books, 2013, ISBN 978-1939140753.
- Gog. London, Weidenfeld and Nicolson, and New York, Macmillan, 1967; Valancourt Books, 2015, ISBN 978-1943910038.
- Magog. London, Weidenfeld and Nicolson, and New York, Harper, 1972.
- The Surrey Cat. London, Joseph, 1976; as Cat, London, Sphere, 1977.
- A Patriot for Hire. London, Joseph, 1978.
- The Facts in the Case of E.A. Poe. London, Weidenfeld and Nicolson, 1979; New York, Holt Rinehart, 1980; Valancourt Books, 2013, ISBN 978-1939140722.
- Beau Bumbo. London, Weidenfeld and Nicolson, 1985.
- King Ludd. London, Hodder and Stoughton, 1988.
- The Far Corners of the Earth. London, Hodder and Stoughton, 1991.
- The Strength of the Hills. London, Hodder and Stoughton, 1992.
- Blood and Kin: An Empire Saga. London, Sinclair-Stevenson, 2002.

=== Uncollected short stories ===
- "To Kill a Loris," in Texas Quarterly (Austin), Autumn 1961.
- "A Head for Monsieur Dimanche," in Atlantic (Boston), September 1962.
- "The Atomic Band," in Transatlantic Review 21 (London), Summer 1966.
- "Twin," in The Best of Granta. London, Secker and Warburg, 1967.

== Selected filmography ==
- The Breaking of Bumbo (1970). Director. Starring Joanna Lumley, John Bird, Edward Fox, Jeremy Child and Richard Warwick.
- Under Milk Wood (1971) Director. Starring Richard Burton, Elizabeth Taylor, Peter O'Toole.
- Blue Blood (1973). Director. Starring Oliver Reed, Derek Jacobi.
- Malachi's Cove (1974). Producer. Starring Donald Pleasence, Veronica Quilligan, Dai Bradley.
- Dylan on Dylan (2002). Director. About Dylan Thomas. Timon Films.

== Publisher of screenplays: bibliography ==
Film scripts published by Lorrimer Publishing, London:

- A Man and a Woman (Claude Lelouch)
- Ashes and Diamonds, Kanal and A Generation (Andrjez Wajda)
- A Nous la Liberté and Entr'Acte (René Clair)
- Alphaville (Jean-Luc Godard)
- A Woman Is a Woman, A Married Woman and Two or Three Things I Know About Her (Jean-Luc Goddard)
- Belle de Jour (Luis Buñuel)
- Blow-Up (Michelangelo Antonioni)
- Brief Encounter (Noël Coward)
- Children of Paradise (Marcel Carné)
- Clockwork Orange (Stanley Kubrick and Anthony Burgess)
- Closely Watched Trains (Jiří Menzel and Bohumil Hrabal)
- Grand Illusion (Jean Renoir)
- Greed (Eric von Stroheim)
- If... (Lindsay Anderson and David Sherwin)
- Ikuru (Akira Kurosawa)
- Ivan the Terrible (Sergei Eisenstein)
- Jules et Jim (François Truffaut)
- King Henry V (Laurence Olivier)
- Knife in the Water, Repulsion and Cul-de-Sac (Roman Polanski)
- L'Age D'Or and Un Chien Andalou (Luis Buñuel)
- Le Jour se Leve (Jacques Prévert and Marcel Carné)
- Le Petit Soldat (Jean-Luc Godard)
- M (Fritz Lang)
- Made in USA (Jean-Luc Godard)
- Masterworks of British Cinema (The Third Man; Kind Hearts and Coronets; Saturday Night and Sunday Morning)
- Metropolis (Fritz Lang)
- Monkey Business and Duck Soup (Marx Brothers)
- Mother (V. I. Pudovkin)
- Oedipus Rex (Pier Paolo Pasolini)
- Pandora's Box (Lulu) (G.W. Pabst)
- Pierrot Le Fou (Jean-Luc Godard
- Rules of the Game (Jean Renoir)
- Seven Samurai (Akira Kurosawa)
- Shanghai Express and Morocco (Josef von Sternberg)
- Six Moral Tales (Eric Rohmer)
- Stagecoach (John Ford and Dudley Nichols)
- The Band Wagon (Betty Comden, Adolph Green and Alan Jay Lerner)
- The Bank Dick (W. C. Fields)
- The Battleship Potemkin (Sergei Esenstein)
- The Bicycle Thieves (Vittorio De Sica)
- The Blue Angel (Josef von Sternberg)
- The Cabinet of Caligari (Robert Wiene)
- The Complete Jean Vigo (Jean Vigo)
- The Exterminating Angel, Nazarín and Los Olvidados (Luis Buñuel)
- The Seventh Seal (Ingmar Bergman)
- The Third Man (Graham Greene, Carol Reed and Andrew Sinclai)
- The Threepenny Opera (Bertold Brecht)
- The Trial (Orson Welles)
- Tillie and Gus (W. C. Fields)
- Tristana (Luis Buñuel)
- Tillie and Gus (W. C. Fields) uel
- What? (Roman Polanski)
- Weekend and Wind From the East (Jean-Luc Godard)
- Wild Strawberries (Ingmar Bergman)

== Acknowledgement ==
- This article incorporates a fiction bibliography from the corresponding Italian Wikipedia article as of 20 November 2010.
