= Under Milk Wood (1971 film) =

Under Milk Wood (film)
- Theatrical release poster.
- Directed by: Andrew Sinclair
- Screenplay by: Andrew Sinclair
- Based on: Under Milk Wood by Dylan Thomas
- Produced by: Hugh French; Jules Buck
- Starring: Richard Burton; Elizabeth Taylor; Peter O'Toole; Siân Phillips
- Cinematography: Robert Huke
- Edited by: Willy Kemplen; Greg Miller
- Music by: Brian Gascoigne
- Production company: Timon Films
- Distributed by: J. Arthur Rank Film Distributors
- Release date: August 1971
- Running time: 87 min
- Country: United Kingdom
- Language: English
- Budget: £273,279
- Box office: £15,862

Under Milk Wood is a 1971 British drama film directed by Andrew Sinclair and based on the 1954 radio play Under Milk Wood by the Welsh writer Dylan Thomas, commissioned by the BBC and later adapted for the stage. It featured performances by Richard Burton, Elizabeth Taylor, Siân Phillips, David Jason, Glynis Johns, Victor Spinetti, Ruth Madoc, Angharad Rees, Ann Beach, Vivien Merchant, and Peter O'Toole as the residents of the fictional Welsh fishing village of Llareggub.

== Plot ==
Along the Welsh coast lies a village called Llareggub – or "bugger all" backwards – which is peopled with eccentrics like Captain Cat, a seafaring man who is losing his sight; the sexy Rosie Probert and Mr. Waldo, a jack-of-all-trades who is full of regret. The story is told by Richard Burton's character.

== Cast ==
- Richard Burton as First Man
- Elizabeth Taylor as Rosie Probert
- Peter O'Toole as Captain Tom Cat
- Siân Phillips as Mrs. Ogmore-Pritchard
- Glynis Johns as Myfanwy Price
- Vivien Merchant as Mrs. Pugh
- Victor Spinetti as Mog Edwards
- Ryan Davies as Second Man
- Angharad Rees as Gossamer Beynon
- Ray Smith as Mr. Waldo
- Michael Forrest as Sinbad Sailor
- Ann Beach as Polly Garter
- Glynn Edwards as Mr. Cherry Owen
- Bridget Turner as Mrs. Cherry Owen
- Talfryn Thomas as Mr. Pugh
- Tim Wylton as Mr. Willy Nilly
- Bronwen Williams as Mrs. Willy Nilly
- Meg Wynn Owen as Lily Smalls
- Hubert Rees as Butcher Beynon
- Aubrey Richards as Reverend Eli Jenkins
- Mark Jones as Evans the Death
- Dillwyn Owen as Mr. Ogmore
- Richard Davies as Mr. Pritchard
- David Jason as Nogood Boyo
- Davyd Harries as Police Constable Attila Rees
- David Davies as Utah Watkins
- Paul Grist as Tom Fred
- Ruth Madoc as Mrs Dai Bread Two
- Susan Penhaligon as Mae Rose Cottage

== Production ==
The film was shot primarily on location in Wales and has since acquired a reputation among aficionados as a cult movie. "The film, beautifully photographed and spoken, casts the brooding spell of Thomas’ verse in its reconstruction of the seaside village and the daily round of its inhabitants", wrote Andrew Sinclair in the International Herald Tribune.

The filming took place in Lower Town, Fishguard, Wales. The choice of location caused protest from some in Laugharne, the town forty miles away (60 km) where Thomas had written the play; an official there said, "To film Under Milk Wood anywhere but Laugharne would be as absurd as filming James Joyce's The Dubliners in Birmingham."

Jacquemine Charrott Lodwidge was the film's production researcher.

== Release ==
The film premiered in August 1971 at the 32nd Venice International Film Festival.

== Reception ==
In The Times, John Russell Taylor wrote:

It is hard to know what to say about a film of Under Milk Wood except that there is really only one way it could turn out, and that is precisely the way this one does. The enterprise is, after all, doomed from the outset by the nature of the original material. The essence of Dylan Thomas's classic radio play was, necessarily, its use of words, of word-painting to evoke with intense vividness all that, in the nature of things, we could not see.

Taylor concluded that "the final effect is to leave one wondering what, precisely, is the point of the exercise".

In The Guardian, Derek Malcolm wrote:

What Sinclair has done is to transpose the piece virtually line by line into visuals, so that if Thomas talks about the sea we see it, if he mentions love then we watch an approximation of it on the screen. ... Perhaps the cinema is simply the wrong medium. Even so, there is another way other than mere duplication. What the camera could have done was to sing its own song of praise, almost as a commentator, a second poet. A freer adaptation might have risked raising more eyebrows; but it surely would have shut fewer eyes.

== Legacy ==
In December 2012 the director of the film, Andrew Sinclair, gave the film rights to the people of Wales.

== See also ==
- Cinema of Wales
- List of Welsh films
