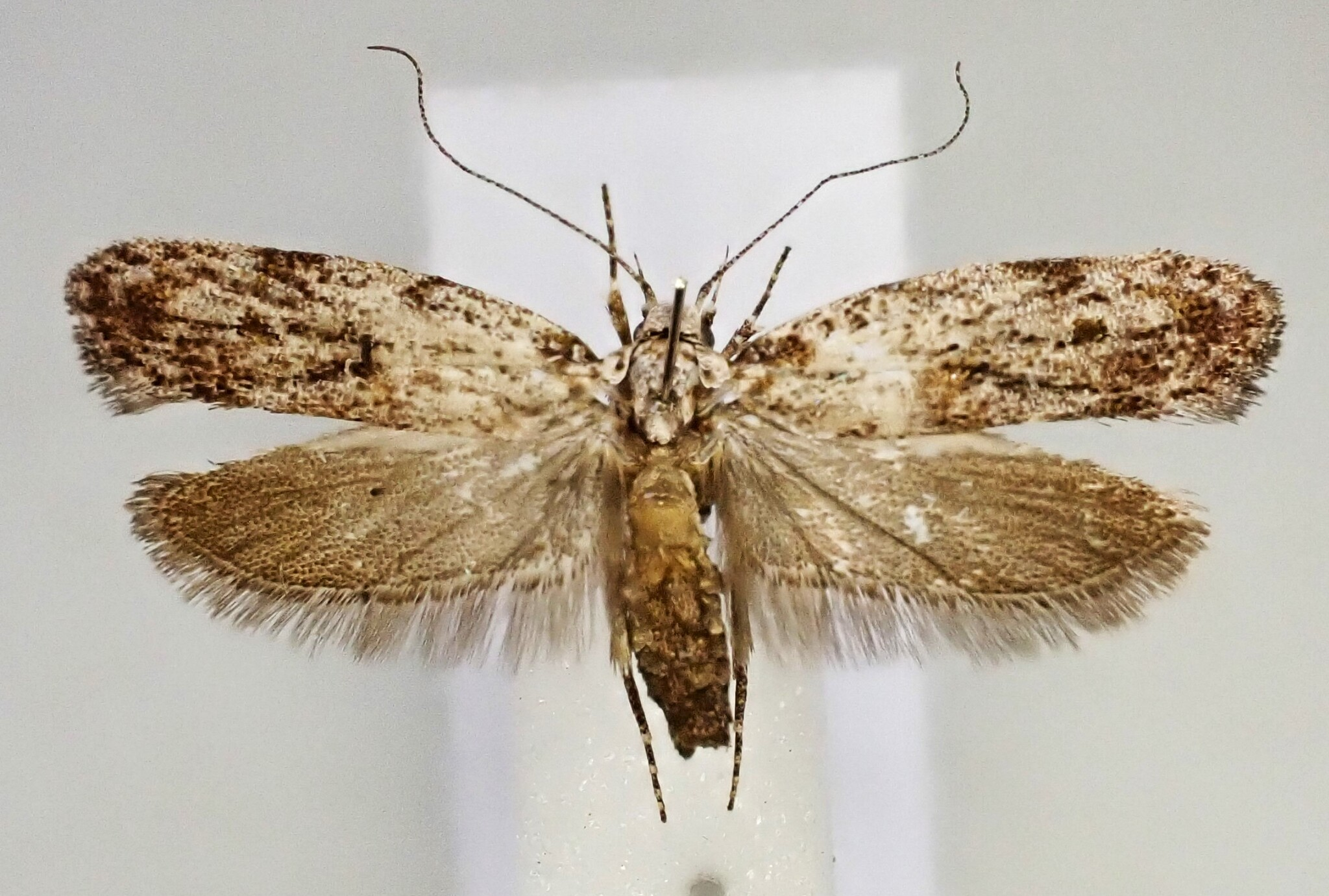
- Izatha gibbsi female, New Zealand, pinned specimen

Scientific classification
- Kingdom: Animalia
- Phylum: Arthropoda
- Clade: Pancrustacea
- Class: Insecta
- Order: Lepidoptera
- Family: Oecophoridae
- Genus: Izatha
- Species: I. gibbsi

Binomial name
- Izatha gibbsi Hoare, 2010

= Izatha gibbsi =

Species of moth

Izatha gibbsi is a species moth in the family Oecophoridae. It is endemic to New Zealand. This species is classified as "At Risk, Naturally Uncommon" by the Department of Conservation. It is named for George W. Gibbs.

== Taxonomy and etymology ==
This species was first described by Robert J. B. Hoare in 2010. It was named in honour of George W. Gibbs in recognition of his contribution to New Zealand entomology. The holotype specimen is held at the New Zealand Arthropod Collection.

== Description ==
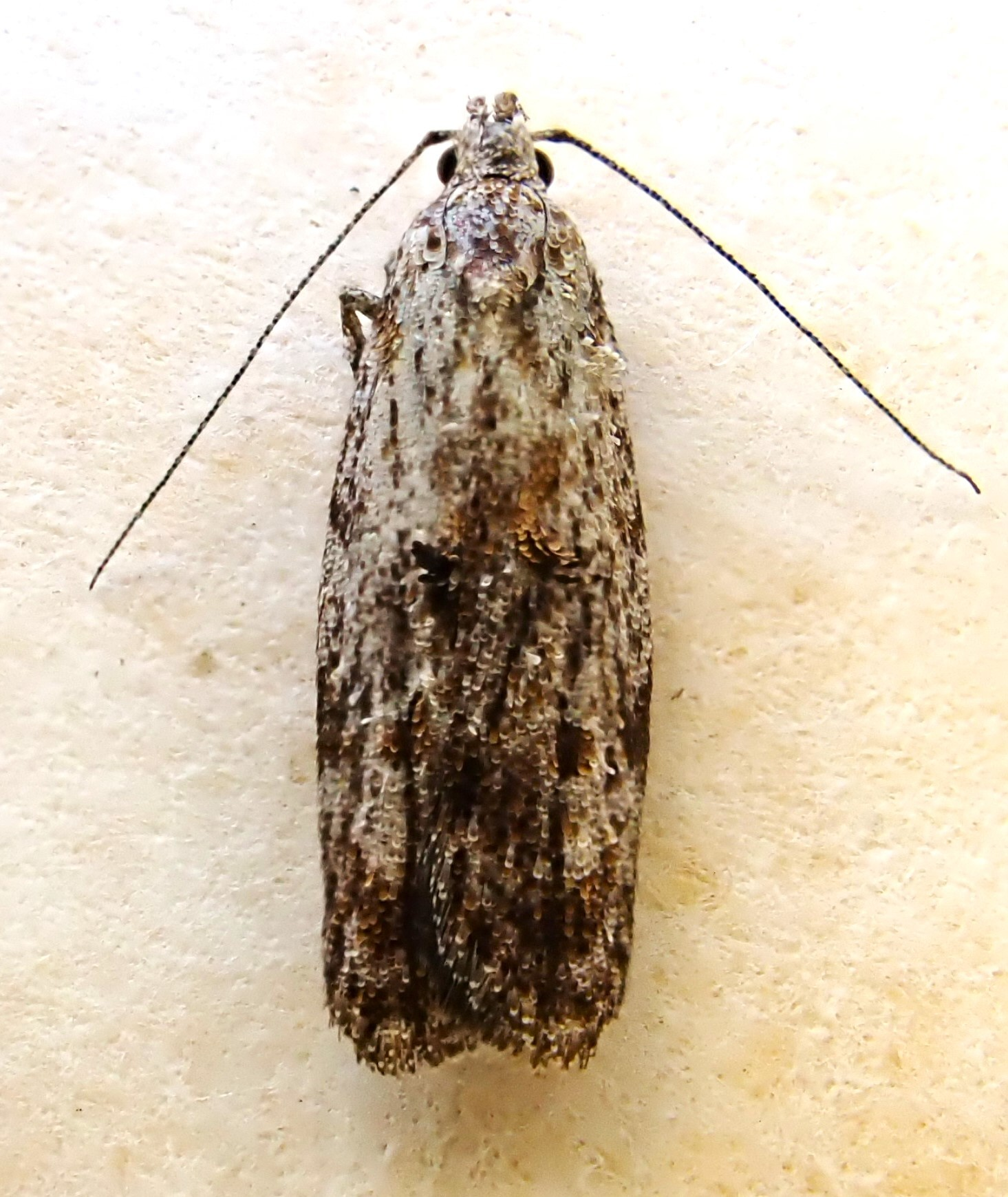
Izatha gibbsi female, New Zealand

The wingspan of this species is 12.5–13.5 mm for males and 13.5–20 mm for females. I. gibbsi is small, grey in colour and has a lack of distinct markings, all features which distinguish it from similar species such I. rigescens.

== Distribution ==
This species is endemic to New Zealand. It occurs in the western parts of the North Island in the Northland, Auckland and Taranaki districts.

== Biology and behaviour ==
Adults have been recorded on the wing in February and March.

== Conservation status ==
This species has been classified as having the "At Risk, Naturally Uncommon" conservation status under the New Zealand Threat Classification System.
