= Hubert Rees =

Welsh actor (1928–2009)

- Born: 27 April 1928; Abergavenny, Wales
- Died: 20 October 2009 (aged 81); Ilminster, Somerset, England
- Occupation: Actor

Hubert Rees (27 April 1928 – 20 October 2009) was a Welsh character actor, known for his supporting roles in British television shows throughout the 1970s and 1980s.

== Early life ==
Rees was born on 27 April 1928 in Abergavenny, Wales.

== Career ==
Rees's early career in television series and shows in character and bit parts, often playing a police officer. In 1968 Rees made his first appearance in the popular long-running British television series Doctor Who. He played the part of Chief Engineer in all six parts of Fury from the Deep. The next year he appeared in another episode of Doctor Who, playing the role of Captain Ransom in The War Games. In 1971 he appeared in the film thriller Unman, Wittering and Zigo. This was followed in 1972 when he was part of the Welsh ensemble cast in the adaptation of Dylan Thomas's Under Milk Wood; he played the part of Butcher Beynon.

Rees continued his career throughout the 1970s appearing in popular television programmes including Softly, Softly: Task Force, The Sweeney, The Sandbaggers and Van der Valk. He also made his final appearance for Doctor Who when he appeared in The Seeds of Doom alongside Tom Baker. He was to appear with Baker again in 1982 when he took the part of Inspector Lestrade in the television mini-series of Sherlock Holmes classic The Hound of the Baskervilles. In 1983 Rees was back in another Sherlock Holmes series, this time as Doctor Watson in The Baker Street Boys. The 1980s saw Rees taking character roles in more popular television shows including Bergerac, Howards' Way and Auf Wiedersehen, Pet. Rees also appeared in Welsh films The Angry Earth (1989) and Darklands (1996).

== Death ==
Rees died on 20 October 2009 in Ilminster, Somerset, England.

== Filmography ==
Year	Title	Role	Notes
1971	Unman, Wittering and Zigo	Blisterine	
1971	Under Milk Wood	Butcher Beynon	
1973	Blue Blood	Dr. Barratt	
1978	Sweeney 2	Bank Manager	
1979	The First Great Train Robbery	Lewis	
1979	Agatha	Official at Literary Luncheon #2	
1984	Champions	Bill (Hiawatha)	
1986	Defence of the Realm	Club Waiter	
1989	The Angry Earth	Mayor	
1996	Darklands	Bill Sawyer	
1997	Food of Love	Red faced man	
2000	Undertaker's Paradise		
