= Jacquemine Charrott Lodwidge =

British bookseller (1919–2012)

Jacquemine Francesca Anastasia Charrott Lodwidge (born Jacqueline Lodwidge) (20 July 1919 – 20 February 2012) was an English writer on crime and magic who also worked as an art director in British-made films and as a bookseller.

During the Second World War, she served with the Free French forces in the Syrian desert and with the British Red Cross as a welfare officer in the Lebanon.

== Early life ==
Born at Langport, Somerset, in July 1919, Lodwidge was the daughter of Dr William Charrott Lodwidge MRCS LRCP, medical officer of health to the Langport Rural District Council, who at the end of the First World War had retired as a Captain from the Royal Army Medical Corps. Originally from Basingstoke, her father's first wife had died in 1917; in 1918 he had married secondly, in France, Louise Elise Marie Kermarec (1894–1977), known as Lisette. Dr Lodwidge, born in 1864, was thirty years older than his second wife. Jacquemine Lodwidge was their only child and was born in 1919. In July 1925, the young Jacquemine won a prize for playing a Dutch girl in a carnival at Langport.

In 1928, Dr Lodwidge retired on the grounds of ill health and died in April 1929, aged 65, when his daughter was nine, leaving an estate valued at £883, equivalent to £47,961 in 2025. She was thus brought up by her French mother, and they continued to live in Langport.

== Career ==
At the beginning of the Second World War, Lodwidge was a student. A French speaker, she decided to join first the Auxiliary Territorial Service and then, in February 1942, the army of Free France (France Libre). As a result, she spent two years working with the Bedouins in the Syrian desert, distributing medical supplies from an ambulance, and by September 1945 was a British Red Cross welfare officer for Syria and the Lebanon.

After the war, Lodwidge returned home to Somerset, and in 1947 was helping to produce school plays there. She went on to study the history of architecture and spent several years in Greece. In the early 1950s she lived in Kensington, and in 1955 was in Cambridge, where she began to use the name Charrott-Lodwidge. By 1960 she was working as a researcher for BBC television, and one bemused Punch reviewer commented on a new programme about everyday London life called Our Street: "I find myself intrigued to notice that the research was done by one Jaquemine Charrott-Lodwidge." In 1962 she was writing television scripts and was then living in a flat on the Thames at Duke Shore, Limehouse Reach. She built up a substantial collection of books for reference, especially children's and illustrated books. Andrew Sinclair credited her as researcher for his book The last of the best: the aristocracy of Europe in the twentieth century (1969). She researched the pictures for George Woodcock’s The British in the Far East (1969) and The British in the Middle East (1970).

In 1974 Ivor Powell acknowledged Lodwidge's help with his book Astrology in the kitchen, and the same year with David Norris she published a book about magic called The Book of Spells.

In 1970 Lodwidge began to develop a career in the movie business, first as a fashion co-ordinator, later as an art director in films and television. However, she became a less active traveller after the death of her mother in 1977. She continued to work as a researcher. In 1980 she moved into a cottage in Langport called Underwall, by a 14th century wall on Langport Hill. She decided to supplement her income between filming assignments by becoming a bookseller and selling some of her own books. Installing her stock in a gazebo, the new enterprise was called Pelekas Books, taking its name from a place Lodwidge had known in Corfu. In The Book Browser's Guide (1982), R. H. Lewis comments "There are herons at the bottom of the terraced garden, and a river from which excellent rough fishing can be had; accompanying husbands or wives not interested in books are invited to bring fishing rods. The building has been redesigned with film-set type features such as a spiral staircase and a gazebo, where the books are now housed... Normal hours, when Jacquemine is not on location, so strictly by appointment.” Pelikas Books was still listed in 1984.

She first worked with the director Henry Herbert as art director on his Malachi's Cove (1973), and worked with him again in the same role on Emily (1976), starring Koo Stark.

Lodwidge helped Daniel Farson with research into the case of Jack the Ripper and caused some surprise by claiming that the serial killer may have been none other than King Leopold II of the Belgians. Her reasons for suspecting him were that his life was scandalous, that he was sadistic in his treatment of the people of the Belgian Congo, and that his house in London may have been the one to which a medium, Robert James Lees, led the police after a psychic experiment to find the killer.

== Personal life ==
On 22 February 1992, Lodwidge married Commander Derek George Harbroe ('Jake') Wright DSC of Shillingford in Oxfordshire. Her husband, a Brooke Bond tea trader who had had a distinguished wartime naval career in motor-torpedo-boats, died in 2008, aged ninety-two.

Lodwidge died in Somerset in February 2012 at the age of 92.

== Films ==
- The Breaking of Bumbo (1970) : fashion co-ordinator
- Under Milk Wood (1972) : production researcher
- Blue Blood (1973) : art director
- Malachi's Cove (1973) : art director
- Autobiography of a Princess (1975) : setting
- Spanish Fly (1975) : art director
- Emily (1976) : art director
- The Ups and Downs of a Handyman (1976) : art director
- Keep It Up Downstairs (1976) : art director

== Publications ==
- David Norris, Jacquemine Charrott-Lodwidge, The Book of Spells (Lorrimer, 1974)
