= Malachi's Cove =

- Lobby card
- Directed by: Henry Herbert
- Written by: Henry Herbert
- Based on: Malachi's Cove by Anthony Trollope
- Produced by: Andrew Sinclair; Kent Walwin
- Starring: Donald Pleasence; Veronica Quilligan; Dai Bradley
- Cinematography: Walter Lassally
- Edited by: Teddy Darvas
- Music by: Brian Gascoigne
- Production company: Penrith Productions
- Distributed by: Impact Quadrant Films
- Release date: 29 November 1974
- Running time: 86 minutes
- Countries: United Kingdom; Canada
- Languages: English; Cornish

Malachi's Cove (also known as The Seaweed Children) is a 1974 British-Canadian coming-of-age period drama film directed by Henry Herbert and starring Donald Pleasence, Veronica Quilligan and Dai Bradley. It was written by Herbert based on the 1864 short story Malachi's Cove by Anthony Trollope.

== Plot ==
In North Cornwall, 1880, Mally Trenglos, a tough young girl aged sixteen, collects seaweed and sells it as fertilizer for the local farmers. She lives with her grandfather Malachi in a little hut above the cove where she collects seaweed. Her parents died two years before from drowning. When Mally's mother discovered her father's body, she wanted him to be buried and stayed with his body in a dangerous storm. Mally went in the village to get help but no one came. The Gunliffes, a local farming family, answered but did not believe her. By the time she was back at the sea, Mally's mother had also drowned.

The film focuses on the life of Mally, her grandfather and Barty Gunliffe, a local boy (son of the family who did not believe Mally when she claimed of her mum's drowning) who keeps taking weed from their cove. Barty and Mally remain enemies until one day when Barty comes to prove to Mally that he is not afraid of the stormy ocean. As a result, he hits his head on a rock. He is unconscious but Mally manages to pull him from the sea. Luckily, though, Barty survives. However, Mrs. Gunliffe, who despises Mally, has a suspicion that Mally tried to kill him. In the end, Barty and Mally become friends and the film ends with Barty helping Mally collect the seaweed.

== Cast ==
- Donald Pleasence as Malachi Trenglos
- Dai Bradley as Barty Gunliffe
- Veronica Quilligan as Mally Trenglos
- Peter Vaughan as Mr. Gunliffe
- Lillias Walker as Mrs. Gunliffe
- Arthur English as Jack Combes
- David Howe as Jake Combes
- Kennaley Hoyle as Matt Combes
- John Barrett as Reverend Polwarth
- Alan Hockey as Dr. Peverick
- George Malpas as Mr. Eliot
- Meg Wynn Owen as Mally's mother
- Peter Wyatt as Mr. Carew
- David Foxxe as Mr. Carew's Clerk
- Derek Carpenter as Dr. Peverick's assistant
- Claire Davenport as lady in store
- Linda Robson and Pauline Quirke as girls in store

== Production ==
Jacquemine Charrott Lodwidge was the film's art director.

The film was made at Bray Studios and the location filming was carried out in Trebarwith Strand but most was in Clovelly.

== Reception ==
The Monthly Film Bulletin wrote: "It's pleasing to see a modest British film avoiding the usual tired formats for U certificate entertainment, but sadly there is little dramatic conviction behind the pretty pictures of Cornish coves, cliffs and cobbles. The flashbacks to the drowning and failed rescue attempt occur too frequently, and the performers only emphasise the uncomfortably bogus nature of the whole enterprise. Veronica Quilligan, as the urchin heroine, looks as though she regularly has four square meals a day, while Donald Pleasence – pipe in mouth, coughing and muttering Old Cornish proverbs (all of them swiftly translated for the uninitiated) – provides some swiftly fading colour. 'Oh yes, you laugh at my Cornish', he says scornfully at one point. Yes indeed, unfortunately."
