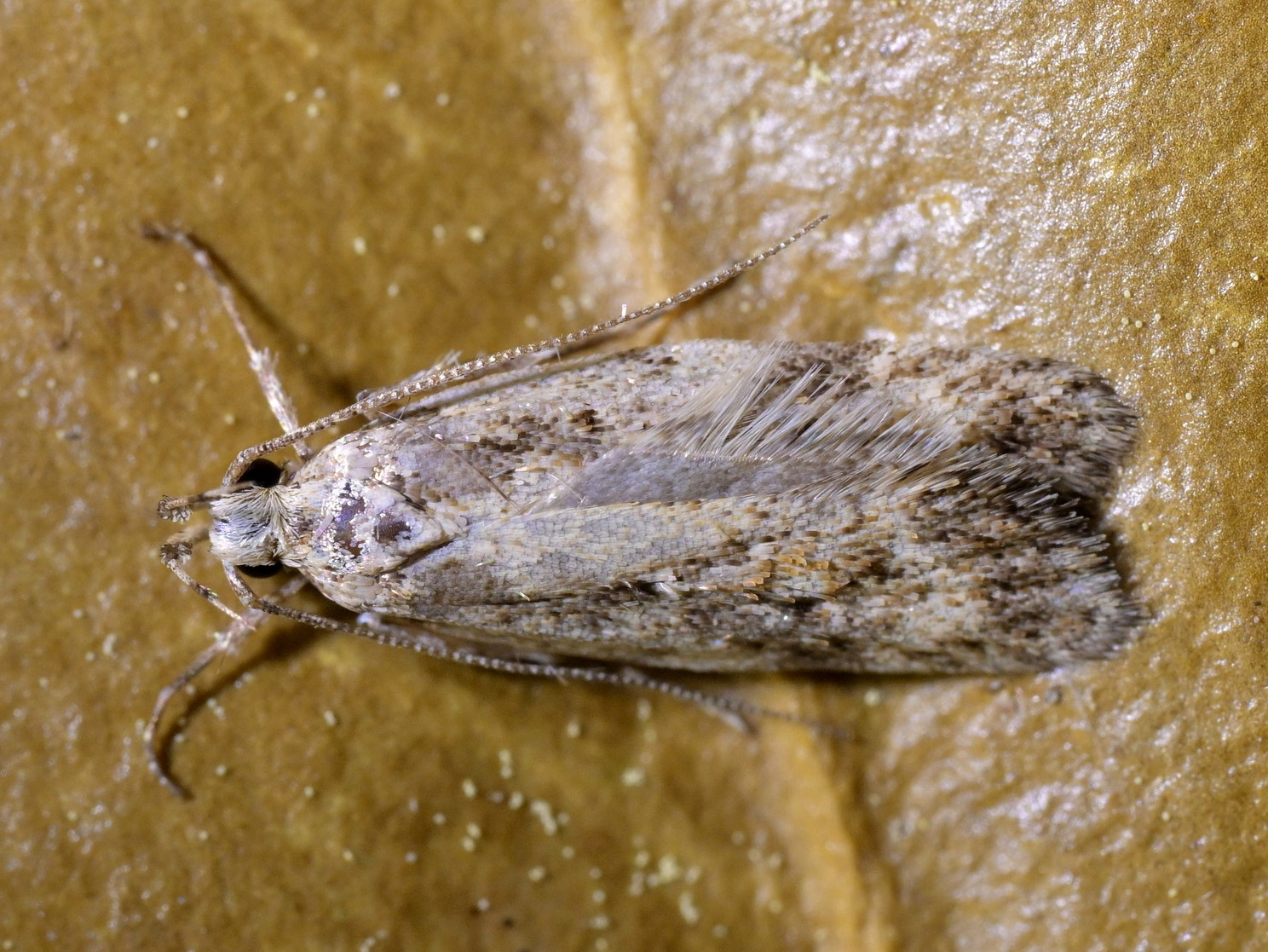

Conservation status
- Data Deficit (NZ TCS)

Scientific classification
- Kingdom: Animalia
- Phylum: Arthropoda
- Clade: Pancrustacea
- Class: Insecta
- Order: Lepidoptera
- Family: Oecophoridae
- Genus: Izatha
- Species: I. rigescens

Binomial name
- Izatha rigescens Meyrick, 1929

= Izatha rigescens =

Species of moth endemic to New Zealand

Izatha rigescens is a species of moth in the family Oecophoridae. This species was first described by Edward Meyrick in 1929. It is endemic to New Zealand. It is only known from the Wellington coast. In 2025 this species was classified as "data deficient" under the New Zealand Threat Classification System.

== Taxonomy ==
This species was first described by Edward Meyrick in 1929 using a male specimen collected by George Hudson at Point Howard in Lower Hutt in March. Hudson described and illustrated the species in his 1939 publication A supplement to the butterflies and moths of New Zealand. The holotype of this species is held at the Natural History Museum, London.

== Description ==
Meyrick described the species as follows:

♂. 17 mm. Head, thorax white mixed grey. Palpi white, second joint mixed dark grey, terminal joint with blackish median band and subbasal ring, anterior edge dark grey towards tip. Forewings elongate, slightly dilated, costa gently arched, apex obtuse, termen obliquely rounded; grey-whitish irrorated grey; an irregular grey streak mixed blackish from base of costa above fold to elongate black plical stigma; light grey suffusion with irregularly scattered black scales extends also to dorsum at base, over posterior part of cell, above fold to extremity, and forms an irregular excurved fascia at 2/3, a terminal fascia confluent with this beneath, and spots on costa at 1/3 and 4/5; an elongate blackish mark representing second discal stigma beneath this a spot of ochreous-whitish suffusion: cilia whitish mixed grey and blackish-grey except towards base. Hindwings light grey; cilia whitish, a light grey subbasal line.

The forewing of this species is brownish in colour, its scales are not contrastingly white tipped and the hindwings are pale brownish. I. rigescens could be confused with I. gibbsi but the former is more brownish in colour and has much paler hindwings. I. rigescens could also be confused with Thamnosara sublitella as they are both similar in size and colouring. However I. rigescens lacks the tufted second segment of the labial palp of T. sublitella so the two should be easy to distinguish on close examination.

== Distribution ==
This species is endemic to New Zealand. This species has only been found on coast of the Wellington region.

== Biology and behaviour ==
Very little about the biology of this species is known. Adults of this species are on the wing in March. The flight period is therefore rather late in the season which may have contributed to this species being overlooked.

== Host species and habitat ==
The host species for the larvae of this moth is unknown. It has been hypothesised that the larvae of this species feeds on dead wood. It has also been suggested that the species might be associated with lichens and/or epiphytic mosses. Hudson collected the five known specimens of this moth by beating coastal scrub at Point Howard.

== Conservation status ==
In 2025 this species was classified by the New Zealand Department of Conservation as "data deficient" under the New Zealand Threat Classification System.
