= Blue Blood (1973 film) =

1973 British film by Andrew Sinclair

- Theatrical release poster
- Directed by: Andrew Sinclair
- Written by: Andrew Sinclair
- Based on: The Carry-Cot by Alexander Thynn
- Produced by: John Trent; Kent Walwin
- Starring: Oliver Reed; Fiona Lewis; Derek Jacobi; Anna Gaël; Meg Wynn Owen
- Cinematography: Harry Waxman
- Edited by: Keith Palmer
- Music by: Brian Gascoigne
- Production company: Mallard Productions
- Distributed by: Impact Quadrant Films
- Release date: 1973
- Running time: 82 minutes
- Country: United Kingdom
- Language: English

Blue Blood is a 1973 British horror drama film directed and written by Andrew Sinclair and starring Oliver Reed, Fiona Lewis, Derek Jacobi and Anna Gaël. It was based on the 1972 novel The Carry-Cot by Alexander Thynn, 7th Marquess of Bath.

== Plot ==
Gregory, the young lord of the Swanbrook estate, engages German nanny Beate to care for his children while he pursues a life of debauchery with his mistress Carlotta and their affluent friends. His wife Lily, a touring singer, makes occasional visits. Gregory entrusts all running of the Swanbrook manor house to his menacing butler, Tom, who scorns his weak-willed master's decadent ways and plots to take control. From her interactions with the other servants, Beate comes to realise that Tom is, in many ways, already the true master of Swanbrook.

Tom uses dark magic against Beate, Carlotta and Lily, giving them visions of a Satanic ritual involving the sacrifice of Gregory and Lily's son, Edgar. When Edgar and his sister are found with unexplained injuries, Beate is accused of child abuse and given notice.

Tom passes the visions on to Gregory, whose mind is broken when he pictures Tom sacrificing Edgar. In the closing scenes, Tom, having fully usurped Gregory, changes into his master's attire and greets the returning Lily (who does not question the change) as his lady.

== Cast ==
- Oliver Reed as Tom
- Fiona Lewis as Lily
- Derek Jacobi as Gregory
- Anna Gaël as Carlotta
- Meg Wynn Owen as Beate
- John Rainer as Clurman
- Richard Davies as Jones
- Gwyneth Owen as Agnes
- Patrick Carter as Cocky
- Elaine Ives-Cameron as Serena
- Tim Wylton as Morrell
- Hubert Rees as Dr Barratt
- Dilys Price as Mrs Barratt
- Andrew McCall as Gerrard
- Sally Anne Newton as Susannah
- Timon Sinclair as Edgar

== Production ==
Jacquemine Charrott Lodwidge was the film's art director.

The film was made on location at Longleat House, the seat of the Marquesses of Bath. According to Sinclair, it was filmed in three weeks.

== Critical reception ==
Richard Combs of The Monthly Film Bulletin described Blue Blood as a series of "cheap, coarsely-filmed charades" and criticised the film's direction: "once Sinclair gets down to working out his theme (black-blooded butler usurps degenerate, blue-blooded employer), the skimpiness of his material and the shoddiness of this TV-sketch technique become painfully evident." He also wrote that Reed's performance made Tom "one of the most physically repellent of screen villains".

Describing the film as "a variation on Harold Pinter's The Servant", Graeme Clark of website The Spinning Image writes that Blue Blood over-emphasises a simple premise and frustratingly leaves plot threads unresolved. He notes that although the Satanic images build suspense, they do not pay off as they are merely symbolic. He also argues that the film is sustained solely by the performances of the cast, adding however that none of them are "really working at full strength here".

Leslie Halliwell said: "An extremely unattractive, would-be satirical melodrama which plays like a Grand Guignol version of The Servant."

The Radio Times Guide to Films gave the film 1/5 stars, writing: "It's hard to describe just how abysmal this reworking of The Servant really is. It is directed with revolting enthusiasm by Andrew Sinclair, who has not been entrusted with many features since. As the vicious butler intent on destabilising his weak-kneed aristocratic employer (Derek Jacobi), Oliver Reed gesticulates and rolls his eyes."

== Sources ==
- Rigby, Jonathan. English Gothic: A Century of Horror Cinema. Reynolds & Hearn, 2000.
