= John Coquillon =

Dutch cinematographer (1930–1987)

- Born: 29 July 1930; The Hague, Netherlands
- Died: 1987 (aged 56–57)
- Occupation: Cinematographer
- Years active: 1956–1987

John Coquillon, BSC (29 July 1930–1987) was a Dutch-British cinematographer, best known internationally for his collaborations with director Sam Peckinpah. He won the Genie Award for Best Cinematography for his work on The Changeling (1980).

== Biography ==
Born in The Hague, Netherlands, Coquillon started in the British film industry as a Pinewood Studios clapper loader in the 1950s before becoming a documentary cameraman later in the decade shooting numerous wildlife movies throughout Africa. Coquillon relocated from Africa back to the UK in the mid-1960s, working on a number of Children's Film Foundation productions. His ability to work speedily and utilize natural light brought him to the attention of writer Alfred Shaughnessy, who recommended Coquillon to director Michael Reeves for Witchfinder General (1968), the first of several horror films that he worked on for American International Pictures.

In 1971, Coquillon began a fruitful working relationship with Sam Peckinpah, first serving as cinematographer for the controversial director's critically acclaimed Straw Dogs. He later shot Peckinpah's Pat Garrett and Billy the Kid (1973), Cross of Iron (1977), and The Osterman Weekend (1983). After Osterman, the majority of Coquillon's remaining credits were in television, including the television movie Ivanhoe (1982) and numerous miniseries.

Coquillon's other films include The Wilby Conspiracy (1975) and Clockwise (1986). He won the Best Cinematographer Genie Award in 1980 for The Changeling.

== Filmography ==
Feature films

- Zanzabuku (1956)
- The Impersonator (1961)
- Call Me Bwana (second unit cinematography only) (1963)
- The Last Safari (second unit cinematography only) (1967)
- Curse of the Crimson Altar (1968)
- Witchfinder General (1968)
- The Body Stealers (1969)
- The Oblong Box (1969)
- Wuthering Heights (1970)
- Straw Dogs (1971)
- The Triple Echo (1972)
- The National Health (1973)
- Pat Garrett and Billy the Kid (1973)
- Inside Out (1975)
- The Wilby Conspiracy (1975)
- Echoes of a Summer (1976)
- Cross of Iron (1977)
- Absolution (1978)
- The Thirty Nine Steps (1978)
- A Nightingale Sang in Berkeley Square (1979)
- The Changeling (1980)
- Crossover (1980)
- Final Assignment (1980)
- The Amateur (1981)
- The Osterman Weekend (1983)
- The Wars (1983)
- Clockwise (1986)
- Hyper Sapien: People from Another Star (1986)

Television films

- The Story of David (1976)
- The Four Feathers (1978)
- All Quiet on the Western Front (1979)
- Ivanhoe (1982)
- Mandela (1987)

== Awards and nominations ==
Award	Year	Category	Work	Result
Genie Award	1980	Best Achievement in Cinematography	The Changeling	Won
