= Carey Harrison =

English novelist and dramatist (1944–2025)

- Born: 19 February 1944; Kensington, London, England
- Died: 23 January 2025 (aged 80); St. Leonards-on-Sea, East Sussex, England
- Education: Sunningdale School; Harrow School; Jesus College, Cambridge
- Occupations: Novelist, playwright, radio dramatist
- Spouse: Claire Lambe (m. 1992)
- Children: 4
- Parent(s): Rex Harrison; Lilli Palmer
- Website: carey-harrison.com

Carey Harrison (19 February 1944 – 22 January 2025) was an English novelist and dramatist.

== Early years and education ==
Harrison was born in London to actor Rex Harrison and actress Lilli Palmer, and raised in Los Angeles and New York, where he attended the Lycée Français. Subsequently, in Britain, he attended Sunningdale School, Harrow School, and Jesus College, Cambridge. While attending university he was a member of the Cambridge University Theatre Company. During his membership he directed a production of Shakespeare's 'The Tempest' which was performed at the 1964 Edinburgh Fringe Festival.

== Career ==
His first play, Dante Kaputt, was staged at the Phoenix Theatre, Leicester, in 1966. Subsequent plays were premiered at the Traverse Theatre in Edinburgh and the Stables Theatre Club in Manchester, where Harrison was Resident Playwright from 1969 to 1970. His drama output for radio and television includes numerous award-winning plays, among them are I Never Killed My German (which won a Giles Cooper Award in 1979), Hitler in Therapy and A Cook's Tour of Communism. His work, A Cook's Tour of Communism, was broadcast by the BBC World Service in 2008. His radio drama, Breakfast With Stalin, was premiered in 2010 by Westdeutscher Rundfunk Koeln in Germany, where 16 of Harrison's plays have been broadcast in translation.

In 2009, a stage play, Scenes From a Misunderstanding, a comedy about the relationship between Sigmund Freud and Carl Jung, was premiered at the Jewish Theatre Festival in Manhattan, and subsequently re-mounted at the Byrdcliffe Theater in Woodstock, New York, along with Bad Boy, a companion piece written for the New York cast. A subsequent play, Magus, was staged by The Woodstock Players in June 2010, and another, Midget in a Catsuit Reciting Spinoza, in June 2011. His next play, Hedgerow Specimen, was staged by The Woodstock Players in June 2012. Three new plays for the Woodstock Players, I Won't Bite You: an Interview with the Notorious Monster, Dorothea Farber, and Rex & Rex, were premiered in repertoire in June and July 2013. 17 hours of Harrison's work have been seen on Masterpiece Theatre, including the miniseries Freud.

He was the author of 40 stage plays and 16 novels, most notably Richard's Feet, published by Henry Holt and Company in the US and by Heinemann in Britain, winner of the Encore Award from the UK Society of Authors.

Harrison received grants from the UK Arts Council, and his prizes included Sony Radio Academy Awards, the Giles Cooper Award, the Prix Marulic, the Writers' Guild of Great Britain Award for Best Play, the Prix Italia Silver Award and the Best Play award from the Berlin Akademie der Kuenste, as well as two nominations (2005 and 2007) for the Pushcart Prize for Journalism. His work has been translated into thirteen languages. His output includes published translations from French, Italian, German and Spanish authors, and performed translations from the works of Pirandello, Goldoni, Feydeau, and Gert Hofmann.

From 2005 to 2011 he contributed a monthly essay on linguistic trends in The Vocabula Review, and since November 2011, a column on fiction-writing in Roll Magazine Online. His essays appeared in such magazines as New Politics, a journal of socialist thought, and Chronicles, a paleoconservative magazine of American culture. He was a book reviewer for newspapers and journals including The San Francisco Chronicle, the Chicago Tribune, and The London Review of Books.

== Activism ==
Harrison was one of the London Recruits, a group of young people recruited by the African National Congress (ANC) in the 1960s and 1970s to smuggle ANC and SACP literature into South Africa after the ANC had been decimated by the Rivonia trials which ran from 9 October 1963 to 12 June 1964.

== Personal life and death ==
Harrison was the half-brother of actor and singer Noel Harrison. His first wife was Mary Chamberlain. Harrison lived in Woodstock, upstate New York for 28 years, and latterly in St. Leonards-on-Sea, East Sussex, England, with his wife, the artist Claire Lambe. He had three children and a stepdaughter. Until January 2025 when he retired, he was a Professor of English at Brooklyn College of the City University of New York.

After a brief illness, Harrison died at his home in St. Leonards-on-Sea, East Sussex, on 23 January 2025. He was 80.

== Notable works ==
=== Novels ===
- Freud (1984)
- Richard's Feet (1990)
- Cley (1991)
- Egon (1993)
- How To Push Through (2002)
- Dog's Mercury (2005)
- Who Was That Lady? (2005)
- Justice (2005)
- Personal Assistant (2006)
- Clear To Kill (2006)
- As An Unperfect Actor on the Stage (2006)

=== Plays ===
- Dante Kaputt (1966)
- Twenty-Six Efforts at Pornography (1968)
- In a Cottage Hospital (1969)
- Wedding Night (from Gert Hoffmann) (1969)
- Lovers (1970)
- Shakespeare Farewell (1970)
- The Bequest (1971)
- Manoeuvres (with Jeremy Paul) (1974)
- Madcap (from Pirandello) (1976)
- Servant of Two Masters (from Goldoni) (1978)
- I Never Killed My German (1979)
- A Short Walk to the Stars (with Jeremy Paul) (1979)
- Visitors (with Jeremy Paul) (1980)
- A Night on the Tor (1980)
- A Suffolk Trilogy: 3 Plays for Radio (1982)
- Who's Playing God? (1983)
- I Killed Jacques Brel (1984)
- From the Lion Rock & the Sea Voyage Trilogy: Plays for Radio (1989)
- Mr Pope's Toilet (1990)
- The Water-Cure (1991)
- Newton In Love (1992)
- Last Thoughts Upon St. Paules (1993)
- Self-Portrait With Dog (1993)
- A Walk in the Bois (1993)
- The Empress Wu, The Concubine Wang (1994)
- St. Agnes' Eve (1995)
- For A Son (1995)
- A Call From The Dead (1995)
- The Psychiatrist's Tale (1996)
- East of the Sun (2000)
- Richard's Feet (2003)
- Hitler in Therapy (2005)
- A Cook's Tour of Communism (2008)
- Breakfast With Stalin (2008)
- Scenes From a Misunderstanding (2009)
- Bad Boy (2009)
- Magus (2010)
- Midget In A Catsuit Reciting Spinoza (2011)
- Hedgerow Specimen (2012)
- Rex & Rex (2012)
- I Won't Bite You: an Interview with the Notorious Monster, Dorothea Farber (2012)

=== Screenplays ===
- The Sea Change (1965)
- Sabbatical (1968)
- The Jensen Code (1973)
- The Godson (1981)
- Imaginary Friends (1981)
- Freud (1984)
- Jumping The Queue (1984)
- I Never Killed My German (1986)
- French Cricket (with Jeremy Paul) (1986)
- William (1987)
- Cley (1988)
- Borgia (1990)
- Egon (1995)
- Breaking Up (Is Hard To Do) (2007)
- The Stand-In (with John M. Keller) (2008)
