= Absolution (1978 film) =

1978 film by Anthony Page

- Theatrical poster
- Directed by: Anthony Page
- Written by: Anthony Shaffer
- Produced by: Elliott Kastner; Danny O'Donovan
- Starring: Richard Burton; Dominic Guard; Dai Bradley; Billy Connolly
- Cinematography: John Coquillon
- Edited by: John Victor-Smith
- Music by: Stanley Myers
- Production company: Bulldog Productions
- Release dates: December 1978 (St Martins Lane); 5 November 1981 (London); 1 July 1988 (NYC)
- Running time: 95 minutes
- Country: United Kingdom
- Language: English

Absolution is a 1978 British thriller film directed by Anthony Page and written by playwright Anthony Shaffer. The film stars Richard Burton as a priest who teaches at a boys' school and finds one of his favourite students is playing a nasty practical joke on him. He sets out to investigate the prank and stumbles upon a dead body, leading to his life spiralling out of control. The film also stars Dai Bradley, Dominic Guard and the Scottish comedian Billy Connolly, in his debut film role.

== Plot ==
The film is set in a Catholic boys' boarding school in rural England. It centres on schoolboy Benjamin Stanfield and his unpopular friend, Arthur Dyson; their form master, Father Goddard, and a travelling motorcyclist named Blakey. The film opens with Blakey arriving at the school. He asks Fr. Goddard if there are any odd jobs that he can do but is told there are none available.

Later Fr. Goddard watches Dyson rehearse in a school production of the operetta Patience. It appears he does not like Dyson while he fawns on Stanfield. In the meantime, Blakey has set up camp in the woods near the school. He sneaks into the school kitchen at night and steals food. His camp is discovered the next day by Stanfield and some other boys, and Stanfield strikes up a friendship with Blakey.

The next day, Fr. Goddard discusses the Catholic concept of confession with his class, during which he tells them that a Catholic priest cannot break the seal of confession, even if it involves a serious crime such as murder.

Stanfield, having befriended Blakey, begins to spend less time with his friend Dyson. Fr. Goddard forbids Stanfield to see Blakey again, but Stanfield disobeys the priest. Blakey encourages Stanfield to make up stories about sexual dalliances, which Stanfield recounts to Fr. Goddard during confession. Two policemen, called to the school by Fr. Goddard to remove Blakey from the grounds, beat up Blakey and tell him to move on. When Stanfield arrives later, Blakey is still upset and swears at Stanfield who picks up a rock, but what happens next is not shown. Later, in confession Stanfield tells Fr. Goddard that he has accidentally killed Blakey and has buried his body in the woods. Fr. Goddard goes to the woods to see for himself. At the site where the body is supposedly buried he digs with a shovel and finds what he initially believes to be a head but turns out to be a pumpkin. At this point boys' laughter is heard, and the priest realises that he is the victim of a practical joke. The watching boys warn Stanfield, who is among them, that he will be in trouble, but he says that there is nothing Fr. Goddard can do because he was told in confession. After the others leave, Dyson appears and offers to take the blame but Stanfield pushes him to the ground and walks off. When Fr. Goddard catches up with Stanfield, the boy asks for forgiveness, but as Goddard leaves, Stanfield turns and smiles at the others who are looking on.

Stanfield finds Dyson and suggests Dyson take credit for the joke and later, while the two are in chapel, Dyson enters the confessional to tell Fr. Goddard that he was a willing accomplice. An unseen person then enters, but it is Stanfield's voice that can be heard confessing that this time he really has murdered Blakey. The priest refuses to give absolution, fearing another joke, but again goes to the woods where he actually discovers Blakey's dead body. He returns to the chapel, where he hears Stanfield's voice in the confessional expressing a desire to kill again and that Dyson will be the next victim. Realising that he cannot tell anyone without breaking the seal of confession, Fr. Goddard tries to keep an eye on Dyson and Stanfield. When he sees the boys heading for the woods, he becomes concerned for Dyson's safety and sets off in pursuit but loses sight of them. Later Dyson is not in class, and Fr. Goddard questions Stanfield, who claims that while he and Dyson were together earlier, Dyson became unwell and returned to the school. In a desperate attempt to find Dyson, Fr. Goddard activates the fire alarm, but the boy is also absent at the emergency roll call. Fr. Goddard again questions Stanfield and alludes to his confession, but Stanfield denies the conversation ever took place. Later, in confession, Stanfield is heard apologising for denying the murder earlier, saying he wants to keep it to the confessional, and tells Fr. Goddard where he has buried Dyson's body.

Fr. Goddard goes to the woods again where he finds what appears to be Dyson's distinctive leg brace half-exposed in the ground. He hears laughter and demands that the boy come out. When Stanfield appears, Fr. Goddard strikes him repeatedly in the face with the shovel, killing him. He then runs back to the chapel and prays for forgiveness, but is interrupted by Stanfield's voice. The priest turns to discover Dyson, who tells him how he imitated Stanfield's voice in the confessional and that it was in fact he who killed Blakey, and later moved the body to another site. Dyson says he did this as revenge for Fr. Goddard's cruelty. Fr. Goddard says he will take the blame for both killings and asks Dyson's forgiveness. Refusing it, Dyson tells him he has the choice of confessing to the killings and going to prison (or, more likely, to an asylum since the priest will be unable to explain his motive due to the seal of confession), or committing suicide, a mortal sin. Fr. Goddard falls to his knees in mortification as Dyson walks away whistling.

== Cast ==
- Richard Burton as Father Goddard
- Dominic Guard as Benjamin "Benjie" Stanfield
- Dai Bradley as Arthur Dyson
- Billy Connolly as Blakey
- Andrew Keir as Headmaster
- Willoughby Gray as Brigadier Walsh
- Preston Lockwood as Father Hibbert
- James Ottaway as Father Matthews
- Brook Williams as Father Clarence
- Jon Plowman as Father Piers
- Robin Soans as Father Henryson
- Trevor Martin as Mr. Gladstone
- Sharon Duce as Louella
- Brian Glover as First Policeman

== Production ==
=== Writing ===
The film was based on an early, unproduced play by Shaffer, a thriller called Play With A Gypsy.

=== Casting ===
Christopher Lee was initially considered for the role of Father Goddard before it was given to Richard Burton.

The co-stars Sharon Duce, who played the girlfriend of Connolly's character, and Dominic Guard later had two children together.

=== Filming ===
The film was shot on location at Ellesmere College, Shropshire and in Pinewood Studios.

=== Alternative ending and cut scenes ===
There was disagreement between Shaffer and Page as to how the film should end. Rather than simply reveal Dyson as the murderer, Shaffer wanted the film to retrospectively show the boy's actions throughout, thus gradually leading the viewer to the terrifying conclusion.

A scene in which Arthur reveals his talent for voices by impersonating Father Goddard was cut from the film, as was a scene that reinforces Goddard's apparent hatred of Dyson, in which the priest fast bowls cricket balls at the boy, who is barely able to defend himself. Some of the scenes between Stanfield and Blakey, which reveal more about the pair's relationship, were also cut.

== Release ==
Absolution premiered in the UK in 1978 and went on general release in 1981, but for legal reasons was not released in the United States until 1988, four years after Burton's death.

== Critical reception ==
Reviews were mixed. Paul Taylor of the Monthly Film Bulletin called Absolution "[a] dire slice of clever narrative trickery". Leslie Halliwell noted that it was interesting and suspenseful but ultimately too complicated, and The Guardian's Derek Malcolm called it a "second-rate murder mystery". Leonard Maltin's Movie Guide referred to the film as "[a] straightforward melodrama [that] loses credibility towards the end". Dragan Antulov found the film to be unexpected and believable and went on to say, "Absolution takes place in isolated yet realistic setting, and the real source of tension is within the characters. Shaffer never takes sides and until the very end the audience is left to sympathise with different characters, never quite certain who among them is good or bad. Because of that constant uncertainty, the atmosphere of the film is very dark and its unusually bitter ending comes as something quite natural".
