= Willoughby Gray =

English actor (1916–1993)

Willoughby Gray MBE
- Born: John Willoughby Gray; 5 November 1916; London England
- Died: 13 February 1993 (aged 76); Salisbury, Wiltshire, England
- Occupation: Actor
- Spouse: Felicity Gray (Margaret Andraea)

John Willoughby Gray MBE (5 November 1916 – 13 February 1993) was an English actor of stage and screen.

== Early life ==
Willoughby Gray was born in London, son of John Gray and Mary, née Henderson. His father was killed in action in Iraq soon after his birth; in 1918 Mary remarried and Willoughby became the stepson of Lieutenant General Henry Pownall.

== Second World War ==
Gray served with distinction during the Second World War with GHQ Liaison Regiment (Phantom). For most of the campaign in Europe he commanded a reconnaissance unit with 11th Armoured Division. For his gallant and distinguished services in the North West Europe campaign, he was appointed MBE. His recommendation reads:

Captain Gray has commanded a divisional patrol with outstanding success throughout the campaign. The resource and initiative shown by him at all times has resulted in a great deal of vital information reaching Army and Corps HQ much more quickly than would otherwise have been the case, in addition, he has shown great enterprise and complete disregard for his own personal safety on many occasions, notably whilst carrying out reconnaissances in the Antwerp area during the advance through Belgium. The bearing of this officer under arduous conditions and his cheerfulness and willingness to do any work delegated to him unhesitatingly have been an example to those with whom he came in contact.

== Acting career ==
He achieved popularity in the mid-1950s after making 38 appearances on the television series The Adventures of Robin Hood. He also appeared in similar television shows such as The Buccaneers and The Adventures of William Tell. He appeared as 'Pete' in Harold Pinter's The Birthday Party on its very first run in 1958, this being just one of countless stage performances he made. Though over-shadowed by his stage career, Gray made a handful of popular films, notably as a priest in Laurence Olivier's film Richard III (1955), The Mummy (1959), Absolution (1978), The Hit (1984) and as the elderly and kind king in The Princess Bride (1987). He appeared in the James Bond film A View to a Kill (1985) as the retired Nazi doctor and Max Zorin's (Christopher Walken) head scientist Dr. Carl Mortner/Hans Glaub.

In the late 1980s, he appeared in the BBC drama Howards' Way as banker Sir John Stevens. In Sergei Bondarchuk's 1970 film Waterloo, he is credited as both an actor (playing Captain Ramsey) and a military consultant.

== Death ==
Gray died aged 76 in February 1993. His wife, who wrote as Felicity Gray (née Margaret Andraea), was a choreographer, speaker and writer on ballet, who notably taught Gene Tierney for her role in Never Let Me Go.

== Selected filmography ==
- The Mark of Cain (1947) – Photographer (uncredited)
- Guilt Is My Shadow (1950) – Detective
- Shadow of the Past (1950) – Chauffeur
- Seven Days to Noon (1950) – Bit Part (uncredited)
- The Woman with No Name (1950) – Group Captain
- The Golden Year (1951) – Sir Norman Grenleigh
- Top Secret (1952) – British Officer
- Phantom Caravan (1954) – Major Thornhill
- Stranger from Venus (1954) – Tom Harding
- Richard III (1955) – 2nd Priest
- The Mummy (1959) – Dr. Reilly
- The Dirty Dozen (1967) – German Officer (uncredited)
- The Man Outside (1967) – Detective Inspector
- Waterloo (1970) – Ramsey
- Young Winston (1972) – Gladstone (uncredited)
- Dead Cert (1974) – Coroner
- Absolution (1978) – Brigadier Walsh
- The Gamekeeper (1980) – Duke
- The Hit (1984) – Judge
- A View to a Kill (1985) – Dr. Carl Mortner / Hans Glaub
- Solarbabies (1986) – Canis
- The Princess Bride (1987) – the King
