= The Jensen Code =

1973 British children's sci-fi TV series

- Title card
- Genre: Science fiction Thriller; Drama; Children's
- Written by: Carey Harrison
- Directed by: Alan Coleman; Jonathan Wright Miller
- Starring: Dai Bradley; Tony Wright
- Country of origin: United Kingdom
- Original language: English
- No. of series: 1
- No. of episodes: 13

Production
- Producer: Alan Coleman
- Running time: 25 minutes
- Production company: ATV

Original release
- Network: ITV
- Release: 28 February – 23 May 1973

The Jensen Code is a British children's television science fiction thriller series. Produced in colour by Associated Television (ATV) in 13 instalments, it originally aired weekly on the ITV network between 28 February 1973 and 23 May 1973. It was written by the novelist and dramatist Carey Harrison (son of actor Rex Harrison).

== Series partial overview ==
The story begins with 16-year-old Terry Connor sat alone in a cavern 100 feet underground whilst on a potholing expedition. The senior Outward Bound instructor, Alex, has long since been missing in the depths of the cavernous subterranean pot named 'Wilmer Deep' after going to retrieve a torch which Terry had dropped earlier. When Alex returns (without the torch) he is strangely convinced that he has been away for ten minutes but Terry knows that Alex has been away for more than two hours. Alex believes that Terry has suffered hallucinations, which he says can be a side-effect of the confined darkness of a cavern. When they surface Terry believes he has seen a man watching them, to which Alex again suggests it is an hallucination and that Terry is not cut out for potholing and so should not go on the big potholing expedition on which the rest of the students will be going the next day. Returning to the outward bound centre, Terry is subjected to much ribbing by his fellow students, including the ringleader Jacko. Terry is convinced that the centre, or the students at least, are being watched; and when the others inform Terry that there is a Ministry of Defence research establishment nearby, he begins to feel increasingly uneasy. Another instructor at the centre, Gordon, becomes aware of Terry's concerns and tells him that he believes his story that Alex had gone missing for two hours, but that he can't say much more than that.

The following day, Terry is detailed to go on his own day and night solo trek above ground. However, eager to prove to himself that he is unafraid of the cave, Terry sets out to return to Wilmer Deep. First, he needs to obtain the key to the gate, which covers the cave and that key is kept at Granny Powell's farmhouse. When Terry turns up there, he is unexpectedly joined by Alex, who is accompanied by Kurtz, the man Terry had seen spying on them the previous day. Strangely, Alex appears vague and seems to have no recollection of setting Terry the trekking task.

Terry follows Alex and Kurtz and witnesses them performing a kidnapping. Terry rushes back to the centre to tell Gordon, who says he works for the security department within the Ministry of Defence and that he is investigating Alex, whom he believes is intending to endanger the life of a scientist in the nearby research unit using the Wilmer Deep pot as a cover to gain access to the research establishment. Gordon also informs Terry that the person who has been kidnapped is Dr. Jensen, the only man who knows important strategic communication codes for a military space satellite to be launched shortly. Gordon takes Terry to a house to keep him safe from Alex and the kidnappers but the safe house turns out to be Granny Powell's farmhouse and, becoming increasingly uneasy about the consistency of Gordon's story, Terry manages to make his escape when Gordon's back is turned.

On the run, Terry stumbles into a nearby farm ruin, which is housing both Dr Jensen and a rather confused Alex, who doesn't seem to remember him. Kurtz and the sinister Mr. Richards find the three there and they lead Alex away and lock in Terry and Jensen. Alone in the barn, Jensen explains that Alex seems to have been hypnotised. Jensen also confirms that he knows the reason that he has been kidnapped and that reason is for the code that he alone knows — the Jensen Code. He tells Terry that Richards has already tried to hypnotise him, but at the moment he has proved strong enough to repel Richard's strong mind control techniques.

The following morning, Terry is removed to the farmhouse where he is subjected to the powerful hypnosis performed by Richards. When Richards is called out to hunt down an escaped Jensen, Terry escapes to the safety of the police station but he remembers nothing, not even his name. Yet there is something nagging at the very back of his mind; in his confusion he believes there is something important he needs to remember but it just won't come to him. After a few days' convalescence at home, Terry is still eager to find some answers to the nagging doubts, which linger in his mind. He decides to return to the outward bound centre and accepts a lift from a vaguely familiar gentleman — called Dr. Jensen.

Thereafter the plot thickens and, at one point, Terry's life is left hanging in the balance.

== Cast ==
- Terry - Dai Bradley
- Alex - Tony Wright
- Gordon - Brian Croucher
- Dr. Jensen - Leon Eagles
- Ron - Paul Alexander
- Jacko - Karl Howman
- Sgt. Buckle - John Barrett
- Kurtz - Dan Meaden
- Mr. Richards - Milton Johns
- Granny Powell - Daphne Heard
- Miss Howard - Barbara Angell
- Radio announcer - Peter Tomlinson
- Military policemen – Paul Haley, John Levene
- Farmer – Stuart Saunders
- Police sergeant – Robin Wentworth
- Doctor – Geoffrey Beevers
- Nurse – Virginia Denham
- Mr. Connor – John Scott Martin
- Mrs. Connor – Angela Crow
- General Hart – Edward Harvey
- Technician – Gerald Turner
- Radio announcer – Peter Plant
- Bairstow – Christopher Moran
- Potholer – Barry Fletcher
- Ross – Edward Phillips
- Caver – Nicholas Brent
- Frogman – Adrian Bracken
- C.I.D. officer – Bill Wilde
- Security man – Denis de Marne
- Technician – Ian Talbot
- Commentator – Jerry Stovin

== Production ==
The Jensen Code was written by Carey Harrison. It was directed by Jonathan Wright-Miller and produced by Alan Coleman. The caving scenes were filmed at Clearwell Caves.

The series was originally made in colour, but the original 625-line PAL colour videotapes have long since been junked or erased for reuse. Episode Six does however remain in colour, although the soundtrack is damaged in places and both sound and vision cut off shortly before the end of the episode. This was included as a special feature on the Network 2-disc DVD release in 2009, being presented unrestored from the original 625 line PAL videotape.

All thirteen episodes of The Jensen Code were released on DVD as 16mm black-and-white film telerecordings, made for overseas sales to countries not yet broadcasting in colour, and is the only format in which the series exists.

== Mistakes ==
Near the start of Episode Six, Dr. Jensen refers to Terry by his real name (David).
