= The Breaking of Bumbo =

1970 British film by Andrew Sinclair

- Original movie poster
- Directed by: Andrew Sinclair
- Written by: Andrew Sinclair
- Based on: the novel by Andrew Sinclair
- Produced by: L. Jeffrey Selznick
- Starring: Richard Warwick; Joanna Lumley
- Cinematography: Ian Wilson
- Edited by: Willy Kemplen
- Music by: Brian Gascoigne
- Production companies: EMI Films; Timon Films
- Distributed by: EMI Films
- Release date: September 1970 (preview only)
- Running time: 90 minutes
- Country: United Kingdom
- Language: English
- Budget: £900,000

The Breaking of Bumbo is a 1970 British comedy film directed by Andrew Sinclair and starring Richard Warwick, Joanna Lumley, Jeremy Child and Edward Fox. The screenplay was by Sinclair, a former Coldstream Guards National service officer, adapted from his 1959 novel of the same name.

== Plot ==
Newly commissioned Guards Ensign 'Bumbo' Bailey learns the facts of life from his new girl friend in Swinging London as well as from his platoon and commanding officer.

== Cast ==
- Richard Warwick as Bumbo
- Joanna Lumley as Susie
- Natasha Pyne as Sheila
- Jeremy Child as Billy
- John Bird as Jock
- Donald Pickering as Jorum
- Derek Newark as Company Sergeant Major Peters
- Don McKillop as Regimental Sergeant Major
- Peter Myers as Commanding Officer
- Simon Williams as Crutcher
- Timothy Carlton as Bean
- Edward Fox as Horwood
- George Janson as Farquhar
- Robert Swann as MacHaffie
- Peter Whitting as Downley
- Robert Russell as Sergeant Clegg
- Howard Southern as Lance Corporal Johnson
- Warren Clarke as Guardsman Andrews
- Andrew Bradford as Guardsman Simons
- Michael Burrell as Guardsman Matt
- Jon Croft as Guardsman James
- Ron Davies as Guardsman Bart
- Peter Laird as Guardsman Munch
- Michael Taylor as Guardsman Smith
- Robert Tayman as Guardsman Phillips
- Francis Wallis as Guardsman Thomson
- William Fox as Brigadier
- Anouska Hempel as debutante
- Jeffry Wickham as Medical Officer
- Chris Chittell as the prisoner
- Oscar James as second student
- Anthony May as art student
- Clifton Jones as black actor
- Graham Bond as himself

== Development ==
The novel came out in 1959 and was a bestseller. Woodfall Films had made an attempt to film it but, according to Alexander Walker "it had come to nothing, because there was not sufficient intervening time to allow the ‘youthful follies’ of the Suez War generation to have turned into the ‘camp amusements’ of the ‘Swinging Britain’ one. It was neither ‘period’ nor modern." In 1962 it was announced Donald Taylor would produce the film from a script by Sinclair for his Carthage Films.

Eventually Andrew Sinclair and producer Jeffrey Selznick, son of David O. Selznick, formed a company, Timon Films, to make a film of Breaking of Bumbo. (They planned to follow it with a film called Wasn't This What You Came to See?) Sinclair later said "I updated the novel so that Bumbo now has to choose between obeying orders during a civil insurrection sympathizing with the young revolutionaries." They set up the film at EMI Films whose head of production, Bryan Forbes admired the novel.

In August 1969 Bryan Forbes announced The Breaking of Bumbo as part of his initial slate for EMI Films with Kevin Brownlow and Andrew Mollo to direct. Brownlow and Mollo dropped out after an argument with the producers and Sinclair became the director. Brownlow recalled:

We had a classic battle with the producer over casting. The producer was the son of David O Selznick and the grandson of Louis B Mayer, so you could see at once we would not get on very well. We had chosen a young actor to play the lead and the producer didn’t want him; he wanted Richard Warwick, who is actually in it. We were so angry that, like fools, we confronted Selznick and you do not behave like that in the film business. He got rid of us. The young man’s name was Christopher Cazenove. Richard Warwick was a perfectly good actor but not right for the part, whereas Cazenove was absolutely spot-on. The film was finally directed by Andrew Sinclair, who wrote the book on which it was based.

According to another account, the first choice for the lead role was Malcolm McDowell who had been in if... (1968) but he was hired to make The Raging Moon (1971) under the direction of Forbes instead, so they hired Richard Warwick who had supported McDowell in if....

The choice of the lead role came down to Joanna Lumley and Anoushka Hempel; Sinclair eventually picked Lumley although Hempel was given a small supporting role.

Sinclair later said "‘I knew nothing about film directing but I had become a top screenwriter in Hollywood and I also ran a little publishing firm, producing classic screenplays in book form. We'd published eighty of them so I did know a lot about the grammar of the cinema. I was an experienced screenwriter and I knew how a film sequence should be put together."

== Production ==
Filming started 26 January 1970. Sinclair was refused use of Wellington Barracks and real guardsmen. "Sophisticated people should enjoy being laughed at occasionally and a bit of fun poked at the establishment does not do any harm," said Sinclair. The barracks were recreated in a studio. Lumley later recalled:

I remember so well the feel of the gauzy see-through dress I wore in one of the scenes, scratchy and be-jewelled, with gem-encrusted pants, and the uneasy feeling of real wrong-doing when I assisted in the demolition of a waxwork of Winston Churchill. Very soon you learn as an actress that you will have to do and say things which are contrary to your beliefs; but you must become the advocate for the character and your job is to inhabit the person and present her as completely as possible. I hated taking my clothes off for bed scenes (I don’t know a soul who is happy with their gear off in front of a large crowd of strangers or, worse, friends). We all had to do it, with varying degrees of success.

Lumley said Richard Warwick "was so funny and good-looking and gay that it made the whole shoot completely bearable." Sinclair later said "‘Of any ten films you make, only one actually works and what you do need in a romance is a sexual spark. But there was no sexual spark between Joanna and Richard Warwick. There wasn’t that sexual magic. Had there been, The Breaking of Bumbo could have worked. That spark simply wasn’t there — but it was through no fault of Joanna’s. It was nothing to do with Joanna’s performance."

By May 1970 the film was being edited. Selznick said "My aim is to simply make a picture that will appeal to as many people as possible. Bumbo will amuse them and perhaps they'll find a sharp message in it."

Jacquemine Charrott Lodwidge was the film's fashion co-ordinator.

== Release ==
The film was previewed in London cinemas in September 1970. The film's release was delayed then cancelled altogether. It was never distributed in Britain, but the producers recouped a little of their costs by selling the TV rights. It screened in Australian cinemas in March 1973. In May 1973 Edward Fox said "I guess the picture wasn't very good because they never released it." "It was just no good," said Bernard Delfont of EMI. In his memoirs Delfont called the film "a messy and unwatchable piece of military hokum".

Academic Paul Moody says EMI considered releasing the film in 1972 and the film was granted an "A" certificate. But by then the British army had been involved in serious fighting in Northern Ireland and EMI decided not to release the film. Moody argues "it is more likely that Delfont, with his connections to the British establishment, and his personal reputation as a family man, felt that a film which satirised the British army could not go out under the EMI name. If there is one thing that all people who worked with Delfont could agree on, it was that he would take the least-risky option if it meant he could avoid tarnishing his own reputation."

In 1974 Richard Warwick said, "the trouble with that film, which really had a marvelous plan for me, was that the director had a row with Forbes and so the man who wrote it, Andrew Sinclair, came in as director. That was a mistake - he'd never directed before. I've never seen the finished film, only rough takes." It debuted on British television in August 1975.

Sinclair later said:

Forbes’s occupancy of Elstree wasn’t easy. When I came, you couldn’t get to his table and when I left he sat alone with me. We were taken over. First we were ABC Pictures, then it was EMI, then it was EMI-MGM and this all happened on two days and the decision was taken that every single film should be scrapped and dumped as a tax loss. That’s what happened to The Breaking of Bumbo. It wasn’t a distribution problem as Joanna and others have thought... It wasn’t not shown on its merit. It was because of a studio coup. Only one of the ten films survived and that was The Railway Children [1970] because that had a child’s market. Everything else was dumped including Bryan Forbes’s own film The Raging Moon. ... On set we shot it conventionally, and, in my opinion, the Army sequences are very good and the Swinging London sequences aren't: They are simply a bit old- fashioned now. But Joanna is very good in it. I loved working with Joanna, she was totally professional, and I thought for a first- time performance in a major role she was superb.

== Reception ==
Robert Murphy wrote in Sixties British Cinema:

From its opening titles it is apparent that The Breaking of Bumbo (1970) is one of David Puttnam and Alan Parker’s despised ‘red London bus movies’... As well as the ubiquitous red buses, the film’s plot seems improbable and its views of Swinging London grinding to a halt amid student demon- strators and bottle-throwing skinheads shoddily unconvincing... The main problem, apart from Sinclair’s uncertain direction, is that Bumbo is a 1950s figure (in the novel he is a guards officer who tries to start a mutiny in protest over Suez), and the idea of transposing him to a late-60s London of demonstrations, sit-ins and student revolutionaries, ingenious though it might have looked on paper, simply doesn’t work. In 1956 Bumbo was a precursor of those upper-middle class young men whose lives were changed by the revelation that assumptions and institutions they had been brought up to think sacred could be questioned, even laughed at. In 1968 he merely looks like a not very bright Hooray Henry torn between the arrogant exclusiveness of life as a guards officer and the decadent temptations of Swinging London. What might have been a powerful liberal riposte to the celebration of traditional values in Michael Powell’s The Queen’s Guards [1961] proves to be embarrassingly inconsequential.

Filmink argued the film "has some great moments, including a spirited Joanna Lumley performance; I think if it had come out when the novel did, in 1959, or even by the mid ‘60s, it would have gone gangbusters… but by 1970, we’d had Richard Lester, and Billy Liar (1963) and the good Michael Winner films and The Virgin Soldiers (1969)… the anarchic military comedy sub-genre had been tapped out. Also, National Service ended in 1960 so the market for servicemen comedies (so large in the ‘50s) simply wasn’t there anymore. Mind you, in fairness, the film never got the chance to find an audience."

== Notes ==
- Ewbank, Tim; Hildred, Stafford (1999). Joanna Lumley: The Biography. Andre Deutsch.
