= The Hound of the Baskervilles (TV serial) =

1982 TV serial

- Based on: The Hound of the Baskervilles by Arthur Conan Doyle
- Directed by: Peter Duguid
- Starring: Tom Baker; Terence Rigby
- Country of origin: United Kingdom
- Original language: English
- No. of episodes: 4

Production
- Producer: Barry Letts
- Camera setup: Multi-camera (studio)

Original release
- Network: BBC
- Release: 3 October 1982

The Hound of the Baskervilles is a 1982 British television serial made by the BBC. It was produced by Barry Letts, directed by Peter Duguid, and starred Tom Baker as Sherlock Holmes and Terence Rigby as Doctor Watson. The adaptation aired as a four-part serial. The serial is based on Arthur Conan Doyle's 1902 Sherlock Holmes novel The Hound of the Baskervilles. The music score was composed and conducted by Carl Davis.

== Background and production ==
This production of Doyle's The Hound of the Baskervilles was the second multi-part BBC adaptation, following Peter Cushing's two-part episode for the 1968 television series. The 1982 serial was part of the BBC's Sunday Classics strand of period dramas and literary adaptations.

The serial was a reunion for Tom Baker, producer Barry Letts and script editor Terrance Dicks, who had worked together on Baker's first Doctor Who serial, Robot (1974–75). As the Fourth Doctor, Baker had appeared in the serial The Talons of Weng-Chiang (1977) wherein the Doctor was dressed as Sherlock Holmes complete with deerstalker. In an interview on BBC Radio 4 in 2009, Baker likened the character of the Doctor to Sherlock Holmes, saying "the point is, Dr. Who's not really an acting part, any more than Sherlock Holmes." Baker himself came to consider his performance in this serial a failure, saying "I couldn't lift the character into that special world that makes Holmes so funny and fascinating."

Terence Rigby, who portrayed Watson in this production, later played Inspector Layton in the 1983 version of The Sign of Four featuring Ian Richardson as Sherlock Holmes.

The serial was shot in the BBC's Birmingham studios with exterior shots filmed on Dartmoor for film inserts. In his later autobiography, Baker claimed "the dog who had been engaged by the BBC to play the hound was gentler than Mother Teresa" and had to be coaxed with sausages to attack Nicholas Woodeson.

== Cast ==
- Tom Baker as Sherlock Holmes
- Terence Rigby as Dr. John H. Watson
- Nicholas Woodeson as Sir Henry Baskerville
- Christopher Ravenscroft as Stapleton
- Kay Adshead as Beryl Stapleton
- Will Knightley as Dr. Mortimer
- Morris Perry as Barrymore
- Gillian Martell as Mrs. Barrymore
- Caroline John as Laura Lyons
- William Squire as Mr. Frankland
- Hubert Rees as Inspector Lestrade
- Michael Goldie as Selden
- John Boswall as Sir Charles Baskerville
- Terry Forrestal as Sir Hugo Baskerville

== Reception ==
The opinions of viewers at the time was divided and it has not fared better over time. In 2015, The Daily Telegraph described the adaptation as a "traditional take on Holmes's most famous adventure", and while it selected Baker as 15th in a countdown of "the 20 greatest Sherlock Holmes", it said Baker "may have been better off staying in the TARDIS", arguing that he gave "an oddly flat performance". In 2009, John Walsh of The Independent commented that "alongside the classic incarnations of the great detective by Basil Rathbone, Peter Cushing and Jeremy Brett, audiences have had to suffer the impersonations of Michael Caine, Peter Cook, Larry Hagman, John Cleese, Tom Baker, even Roger Moore."

== DVD ==
The serial was released in Australia on 20 August 2014 by Madman Entertainment. Special features include a commentary by Tom Baker.
