= Dai Bradley =

English actor (born 1953)

- Born: David Bradley; 27 September 1953 (age 73); Barnsley, West Riding of Yorkshire, England
- Occupation: Actor
- Years active: 1968–2018
- Notable work: Kes; Equus (stage); The Refuge; Zulu Dawn

David "Dai" Bradley (born 27 September 1953) is an English actor known for his debut role of Billy Casper in the critically acclaimed 1969 film Kes, directed by Ken Loach.

== Early life ==
David Bradley was born in the hamlet of Stubbs, near Barnsley. His mother was Nora, a seamstress, and his father was Horace "Pop" Bradley, a miner who worked from North Gawber Colliery. By his own account, he had an "unremarkable" childhood, and was not involved in any acting apart from amateur Christmas pantos. He attended St Helen's County Secondary School.

== Career ==
At the age of 14, Bradley gained the part of Billy Casper in Kes. Bradley has said that the experience of making the film was a happy one. The cast was "like one huge family" and he spent much of his time playing with the other young boys who appeared in the film. One of his least favourite memories was of the filming of the football scene, which he recalled in an interview: "They chose the worst day of the summer for that scene. They had a local fire engine come round and flood the field with hundreds of gallons of water. Although it was August, it was bloody cold and freezing."

Following each day's filming, Bradley spent several hours training with the kestrels initially used in the film. One of the three birds did not take to the training, and had to be reintroduced to the wild. Director Ken Loach often used unique methods to elicit authentic emotional reactions from Bradley, such as surprising him with a barking dog, caning him unexpectedly, and telling him that his co-star would truly kill a kestrel for the final scene.

Bradley received BAFTA's Award for Best Newcomer for his role. One critic called his performance "one of the great adolescent portraits in cinema, joining the likes of Jean-Pierre Leaud in The 400 Blows". Subsequently Bradley left school at the age of 17, moved to London and began training as an actor with the National Theatre Company. In time, he worked with Anthony Hopkins, Joan Plowright and Derek Jacobi. He changed his first name to Dai when he joined Equity, the actors' union, which already had an actor named David Bradley on its books.

=== Later projects ===
After Kes was released in 1970, Bradley joined the cast of the children's television programme The Flaxton Boys as Peter Weekes in series two, and starred as Terry Connor in the children's adventure serial The Jensen Code in 1973. He also had guest roles in episodes of popular, established drama series such as Z-Cars and A Family at War.

While he did not receive the same media attention for his subsequent film performances as he did for Kes, Bradley received solid reviews for his theatre acting. He was cast as Alan Strang in Peter Shaffer's Equus during the mid-1970s. After he succeeded Peter Firth in the role at the Old Vic in London, the production embarked on a 2½-year worldwide tour. In the United States national production, he starred with Brian Bedford, and earned standing ovations and a Los Angeles Drama Critics Circle nomination for Best Actor. Of his performance of the role at the Wilbur Theatre, The Harvard Crimson commented that "Bradley has the most difficult role to play in Equus and he is outstanding." Likewise, his portrayal of the character was praised as being "profoundly sensitive", with reviewer Mark J. Bly of The Heights calling the production "equally as good as its New York counterpart and by all means...not [to] be missed." Bradley also played the role opposite John Fraser in South Africa. He was offered the opportunity to take over the role in the Broadway production, but turned it down due to exhaustion.

His additional theatre roles during the 1970s included Souplier in Henry de Montherlant's The Fire that Consumes with Nigel Hawthorne, which was staged in 1977 at the Mermaid Theatre. The play, which concerns a priest who is obsessed with a young student, was the recipient of the Society of West End Theatre Award for Play of the Year (now the Olivier Award) and, with Bradley contributing what was referred to as "a beautifully spontaneous performance" as the student opposite Hawthorne's guilt-ridden Abbé de Pradts. Earlier in the decade, Bradley was featured as Hanschen Rilow in the Old Vic's production of Frank Wedekind's controversial tale of sexual discovery, violence, and repression, Spring Awakening, of which Plays and Players stated that "Dai Bradley's Hans is a virtuoso effort, full of awkward and loquacious passion." The production also garnered strong reviews for co-stars Michael Kitchen, Peter Firth, Veronica Quilligan, and Gerard Ryder as the object of Hanschen's forbidden affection, Ernst.

Bradley played notable roles in several 1970s films including Malachi's Cove (1973), Absolution (1978), All Quiet on the Western Front (1979) and the Zulu prequel Zulu Dawn (1979), but by the early 1980s his film career had largely dissipated. Although he was originally considered for the part of Neville Hope in Auf Wiedersehen Pet, for much of the rest of the decade he worked as a carpenter and renovator after the part went to his close friend Kevin Whately. He also became an adherent of the teachings of Jiddu Krishnamurti. He embarked on several other unsuccessful projects as well: a board game, a television series focused on high-stakes backgammon, and a film about medical ethics. In 1999, he began writing a children's novel.

In 1999, when Kes was re-released in cinemas for the film's 30th anniversary, Bradley made hundreds of appearances in the United Kingdom with the film's other surviving cast members.

In 2003, Bradley appeared as the Catholic priest Father Michael, one of three leads in Nigel Barker's critically acclaimed independent film The Refuge (previously known as Asylum). He returned to the big screen alongside Jason Statham in the 2013 film Hummingbird.

On 8 September 2015, Bradley appeared in an episode of Holby City titled "An Eye for an Eye" as an elderly man who perceives himself as a "bad luck charm". In 2016, he told The Guardian that he had penned a sequel to Kes, but that he had shelved the idea after original author Barry Hines' death.

Bradley was featured in Kit Monkman's new cinematic interpretation of Shakespeare's Macbeth as the Porter/Projectionist. The film was completed by GSP Studios in 2017 and was released in theatres across the UK on 13 March 2018.

== Filmography ==
=== Film ===
Year	Title	Role	Notes
1969	Kes	Billy	
1973	Malachi's Cove	Barty	
1978	Absolution	Arthur	
1979	Zulu Dawn	Pte. Williams	
2003	Asylum	Father Michael	
2013	Hummingbird	Billy	
2018	Macbeth	Porter	

=== Television ===
Year	Title	Role	Notes
1970	Z-Cars	Johnny Marsh	2 episodes
1970	A Family at War	Alfred Powner	Episode: "The Night They Hit No. 8"
1970	The Flaxton Boys	Peter Weekes	13 episodes
1973	Play for Today	Policeman	Episode: "Kisses at Fifty"
1973	The Jensen Code	Terry Connor	13 episodes
1974	Bedtime Stories	Lennie Burr	Episode: "Goldilocks and the Three Bears"
1978	Pickersgill People	Hartley Hellowell	Episode: "The Primitive"
1979	All Quiet on the Western Front	Albert Kropp	Television film
1979	Two People	Per	4 episodes
1981	The Flame Trees of Thika	Alec	3 episodes
1981	If Winter Comes	Oldva	Television film
1982	The World Cup: A Captain's Tale	Ticer Thomas	Television film
1983	Live from Pebble Mil	Ferris	Episode: "The Battle of Waterloo"
1983	For King and Country	Pte. Arthur Hamp	Television film
1983	Those Glory Glory Days	1961 Spurs Team Member	Television film
1985	Samantha's Men	Derek	Television film
1989	Eurocops	Roper	Episode: "Firing the Bullets"
2015	The Dumping Ground	Mal	Episode: "Mischief"
2015	Holby City	Richie Hicks	Episode: "An Eye for an Eye"
