= Richard Warwick =

British actor (1945–1997)

- Warwick in If.... (1968)
- Born: Richard Carey Winter; 29 April 1945; Meopham, Kent, England
- Died: 16 December 1997 (aged 52); St John's Wood, London, England
- Occupation: Actor
- Years active: 1967–1996

Richard Warwick (29 April 1945 – 16 December 1997) was an English actor.

He was born Richard Carey Winter, the third of four sons, at Meopham, Kent, and made his film debut in Franco Zeffirelli's 1968 production of Romeo and Juliet in the role of Gregory. Subsequent films included If...., Nicholas and Alexandra and the first film by Derek Jarman, Sebastiane.

On television, Warwick was best known for his roles in the sitcom Please Sir!, as one of the main character's teaching colleagues, and in the London Weekend Television comedy A Fine Romance, as the brother-in-law of Judi Dench's character. He also played Uncas in the television series The Last of the Mohicans (1971). His last role was as John (the servant) in Zeffirelli's 1996 adaptation of Jane Eyre.

Warwick died in 1997, aged 52, from an AIDS-related illness. In an obituary, The Daily Telegraph quoted If... director Lindsay Anderson: "I never met a young actor like Richard! Without a touch of vanity, completely natural yet always concentrated, he illumines every frame of the film in which he appears."

== Filmography ==
Year	Title	Role	Notes
1968	Romeo and Juliet	Gregory	
1968	If....	Wallace: Crusaders	
1969	The Bed Sitting Room	Allan	
1969	The Vortex	Nicky	TV film
1970	First Love (German title: Erste Liebe)	Lt. Belovzorov	
1970	The Breaking of Bumbo	Bumbo	
1971	Nicholas and Alexandra	Grand Duke Dmitry	
1972	Alice's Adventures in Wonderland	7 of Spades	
1975	Confessions of a Pop Performer	Petal (Kipper)	
1976	Sebastiane	Justin	
1978	International Velvet	Tim	
1978	Mannen i skuggan	Tornilla	
1979	The Tempest	Antonio, his brother	
1982	My Favorite Year	Technical Director	
1984	Johnny Dangerously	Prisoner	
1990	White Hunter Black Heart	Basil Fields, British Partner	
1990	Hamlet	Bernardo	
1991	The Lost Language of Cranes	Frank	
1996	Jane Eyre	John	(final film role)
