= Peter Gilmore =

English actor (1931–2013)

- Gilmore as James Onedin in The Onedin Line
- Born: 25 August 1931; Leipzig, Germany
- Died: 3 February 2013 (aged 81); London, England
- Education: Great Ayton Friends' School
- Occupation: Actor
- Years active: 1958–1996
- Spouses: Una Stubbs (m. 1958; div. 1969) Jan Waters (m. 1970; div. 1976) Anne Stallybrass (m. 1987)
- Children: 1

John Peter Gilmore (born John Peter Gottschalk; 25 August 1931 – 3 February 2013), known as Peter Gilmore, was an English actor in television, film, and stage musicals, known for his portrayal of Captain James Onedin in 91 episodes of the BBC television period drama The Onedin Line (1971–1980).

== Early life ==
Born in Leipzig, Germany, and brought up in Nunthorpe, North Riding of Yorkshire, Gilmore left school at the age of 14 and started pursuing his dream of becoming an actor. In 1952, he attended the Royal Academy of Dramatic Art preparatory school Parada for a short time before being expelled due to his age. While undertaking his National Service his singing talent was noticed and after the Army he appeared in touring musicals.

== Career ==
Gilmore's first major role on the London stage was in 1954 as the King of Spain in You’ll Be Lucky with Al Read. Two years on appeared opposite Cicely Courtneidge in Star Maker as Tom on tour, and returned to London in Grab Me a Gondola at the Hammersmith Lyric (1956), and in 1958 he was cast as Freddy Eynsford-Hill in the London production of My Fair Lady opposite Julie Andrews at the Theatre Royal, Drury Lane which The Times critic described as "most tuneful".

During his early career, he appeared in several other stage musicals, including Lock Up Your Daughters (Ramble), and released a single, "Follow That Girl" (His Master's Voice POP 740) in 1960. He played Macheath opposite Jan Waters as Polly in a 1968 production of the Beggar's Opera in London, in which both were praised for their portrayals; a cast recording was issued on CBS. His final stage role was Lloyd Dallas in the 1987 national tour of the original production of Michael Frayn’s Noises Off.

Gilmore starred as Captain James Onedin in 91 episodes of the BBC television period drama The Onedin Line, created by Cyril Abraham, from 1971 to 1980, After achieving prominence in the long-running role of James Onedin, Gilmore felt he had become typecast as the rugged sea captain.

Gilmore had roles in 11 Carry On films and appeared in many British films including The Great St Trinian's Train Robbery (1966), Oh! What a Lovely War (1969), The Abominable Dr. Phibes (1971) and Warlords of Atlantis (1978). He later appeared in a Doctor Who serial Frontios (1984) in which he played a character called Brazen. Gilmore also appeared in a Heartbeat episode, called "The Frighteners", during the Nick Berry era; his third wife, actress Anne Stallybrass was a regular in the series.

== Personal life ==
Gilmore married three times: to actress Una Stubbs (1958–1969), with whom he adopted a child; to Jan Waters (1970–1976); and to actress and former Onedin Line colleague, Anne Stallybrass (1987–2013), who survived him.

Gilmore died in London on 3 February 2013, aged 81. He was survived by his third wife (Stallybrass), and a son, Jason, adopted during his first marriage.

== Selected filmography ==
- Master Spy (1963) – Tom Masters
- Carry On Cabby (1963) – Dancy
- Bomb in the High Street (1963) – Shorty
- Carry On Jack (1963) – Patch, Pirate Captain, aka Roger
- Every Day's a Holiday (1964) – Kenneth
- Carry On Cleo (1964) – Galley Master
- I've Gotta Horse (1965) – Jock
- You Must Be Joking! (1965)
- Carry On Cowboy (1965) – Henchman Curly
- Doctor in Clover (1966) – Len the choreographer
- The Great St. Trinian's Train Robbery (1966) – Butters
- Don't Lose Your Head (1966) – Citizen Robespierre
- The Jokers (1967) – Man at Party
- Follow That Camel (1967) – Captain Humphrey Bagshaw
- Carry On Doctor (1968) – Henry
- Carry On Up the Khyber (1968) – Private Ginger Hale
- Oh! What a Lovely War (1969) – Private Burgess
- Carry On Again Doctor (1969) – Henry
- My Lover My Son (1970) – Barman
- Carry On Henry (1971) – King Francis of France
- The Abominable Dr. Phibes (1971) – Dr. Kitaj
- Freelance (1971) – Boss
- Warlords of Atlantis (1978) – Charles Aitken
- The Lonely Passion of Judith Hearne (1987) – Kevin O'Nell
- Carry On Columbus (1992) – Governor of the Canaries
