= The Onedin Line =

British television period drama series (1971–1980)

- Genre: Drama
- Created by: Cyril Abraham
- Starring: Peter Gilmore; Anne Stallybrass; Jessica Benton; Howard Lang
- Theme music composer: Anthony Isaac
- Opening theme: Adagio of Spartacus and Phrygia by Aram Khachaturian
- Country of origin: United Kingdom
- Original language: English
- No. of series: 8
- No. of episodes: 91 (list of episodes)

Production
- Producers: Anthony Coburn (pilot episode), Peter Graham Scott
- Running time: 49-51 minutes
- Production company: BBC

Original release
- Network: BBC One
- Release: 15 October 1971 – 26 October 1980

The Onedin Line is a BBC television drama series that ran from 1971 to 1980. The series was created by Cyril Abraham.

The series is set in Liverpool from 1860 to 1886 and covers the rise of a fictional shipping company, the Onedin Line, named after its owner, Captain James Onedin. Around this, it depicts the lives of his family, most notably his brother and partner Robert, a ship chandler, and his sister Elizabeth, giving insight into the lifestyle and customs at the time, not only at sea, but also ashore (mostly lower- and upper-middle-class). The series also illustrates some of the changes in business and shipping, such as from wooden to steel ships and from sailing ships to steamships. It shows the role that ships played in such matters as international politics, uprisings and the slave trade.

== Overview ==
The Onedin Line is a classic BBC drama series set in 19th-century Liverpool, and narrating the changing fortunes of the ambitious Captain James Onedin and his family. A 55-minute pilot episode for the series aired as part of BBC One's Drama Playhouse strand on 7 December 1970, produced by Anthony Coburn.

=== Series 1 (1971) ===
Series 1 played from 15 October 1971 to 28 January 1972 (15 × 50 min episodes).

The series opens in 1860 Liverpool, as 28-year-old captain James Onedin establishes a new shipping company, marrying an older spinster, 30-year-old Anne, daughter of the owner of the schooner Charlotte Rhodes, to do so. Main characters and story are introduced. Narrative unfolds around historically contemporary events, such as a Phylloxera outbreak affecting production of Portuguese wine, making a point of incorporating real events into the fictitious family drama.

=== Series 2 (1972) ===
Series 2 played from 17 September to 31 December 1972 (14 × 50 min episodes)

=== Series 3 (1973) ===
Series 3 played from 21 October 1973 to 27 January 1974 (13 × 50 min episodes)

=== Series 4 (1976) ===
Series 4 played from 25 April to 27 June 1976 (10 × 50 min episodes)

=== Series 5 (1977) ===
Series 5 played from 26 June to 28 August 1977 (10 × 50 min episodes)

=== Series 6 (1978) ===
Series 6 played from 18 July to 17 September 1978 (10 × 50 min episodes)

=== Series 7 (1979) ===
Series 7 played from 22 July to 23 September 1979 (10 × 50 min episodes)

=== Series 8 (1980) ===
Series 8 played from 31 August to 26 October 1980 (9 × 50 min episodes)

== Characters ==
=== Main ===
James Onedin (Peter Gilmore), the younger son of Samuel Onedin, a miserly ship chandler, who left his shop and money to his elder son Robert, and a few words of advice to James. He was a 28 year old penniless sea captain with aspirations to greater things. To become a ship-owner, he marries Anne Webster, who is over 30, some years his senior. She is the spinster daughter of Captain Joshua Webster (James Hayter), owner of the topsail schooner Charlotte Rhodes. At first, it is purely a business transaction on Onedin's part and a pragmatic solution to penniless spinsterhood on Anne's part; but a warmer relationship gradually develops.

On Anne's death in childbirth, 11+ years later (at the end of the second series), James has come to love her deeply. Her portrait continues to hang prominently in his home for many years.

Several years later, James considers two possible replacement wives: wealthy and emancipated widow Caroline Maudsley, and the young heiress Leonora Biddulph (Kate Nelligan), ultimately being rejected by both.

After a slow-burning courtship, he eventually marries his daughter's governess, Letty Gaunt (Jill Gascoine). Tragedy strikes in the first year of the marriage when she, unfortunately in James's view, becomes pregnant. The memories of Anne's death have always remained in his thoughts. In due course, Letty also dies, of diphtheria.

By the final series, James is married to a third wife, the exotic Margarita Juarez, and is, by then, a grandfather. He is framed for theft and imprisoned. He is freed when Elizabeth, Baines, and Samuel discover evidence to clear his name. On his release, he takes to the sea again with Captain Baines, on business to South America, stabilising his life for the next 20 years, only to find Margarita as a stowaway. On the voyage home, she reveals that she is pregnant and unable, as was Baines as a cargo captain, to deliver the baby, so the cook is left to do the job. A baby son is delivered, with both mother and son well. James names the boy William, after Captain Baines. By the end of the series, James is in his mid-60s, or older.

James is a charismatic but morally flexible man, whose eye is always on how to make a profit from any given situation. He seems to consider himself amusing. His actions frequently lead to breaks with his nearest family and associates.

Anne Onedin (née Webster) (Anne Stallybrass), is the spinster daughter of Captain Joshua Webster. In the mid-1850s (before the start of the series) she had been expecting to marry her sweetheart Michael Adams. However, he never returned from his first trip to sea on the "Star of Morn". Anne is now in her early 30s and has nothing to look forward to after her father's death than living on the charity of friends or the workhouse. Having rejected James's offer to form a business partnership with her father, Captain Webster, she proposes and enters into marriage with James, in full recognition that it was a business transaction. She accompanies James to Portugal on his first trip in the "Charlotte Rhodes", on their wedding day. She will subsequently travel with James on many of his trips, including to Australia, the Confederate States of America, East Africa and China.

James's feelings of jealousy become piqued when he returns with his second ship, the clipper "Pampero", to find that Anne's former suitor, Michael Adams, has returned, having previously jumped ship after mistakenly believing he was being made the scapegoat for the murder of the mate of the "Star of Morn". Adams signs on to the next voyage of the "Pampero" with James and Anne, where her conscience is affected when James covers up a death which occurred at the hands of Adams.

Anne is the conscience of James and, when she cannot take his ruthless business behaviour any longer, leaves him to live hand-to-mouth in the Liverpool slums, seriously affecting her health. They reunite after a yellow fever outbreak in Liverpool.

After James spends the money promised for their new house to buy another ship, the "Maria da Gloria", Anne has a miscarriage, brought on by carrying coal from the cellar to her kitchen. This event leads him to sell some shares in the Onedin Line to Lord and Lady Lazenby to finance a fashionable new house for Anne. As Captain Webster opines, "out of guilt".

On her reconciliation with James, she accompanies him to China in his bid to regain control of the Onedin Line. During the voyage she ignores the doctor's warning not to get pregnant, knowing how much James wants a son and heir, and, after a difficult voyage back from China, she dies giving birth to a daughter, Charlotte, less than 12 months after her previous miscarriage.

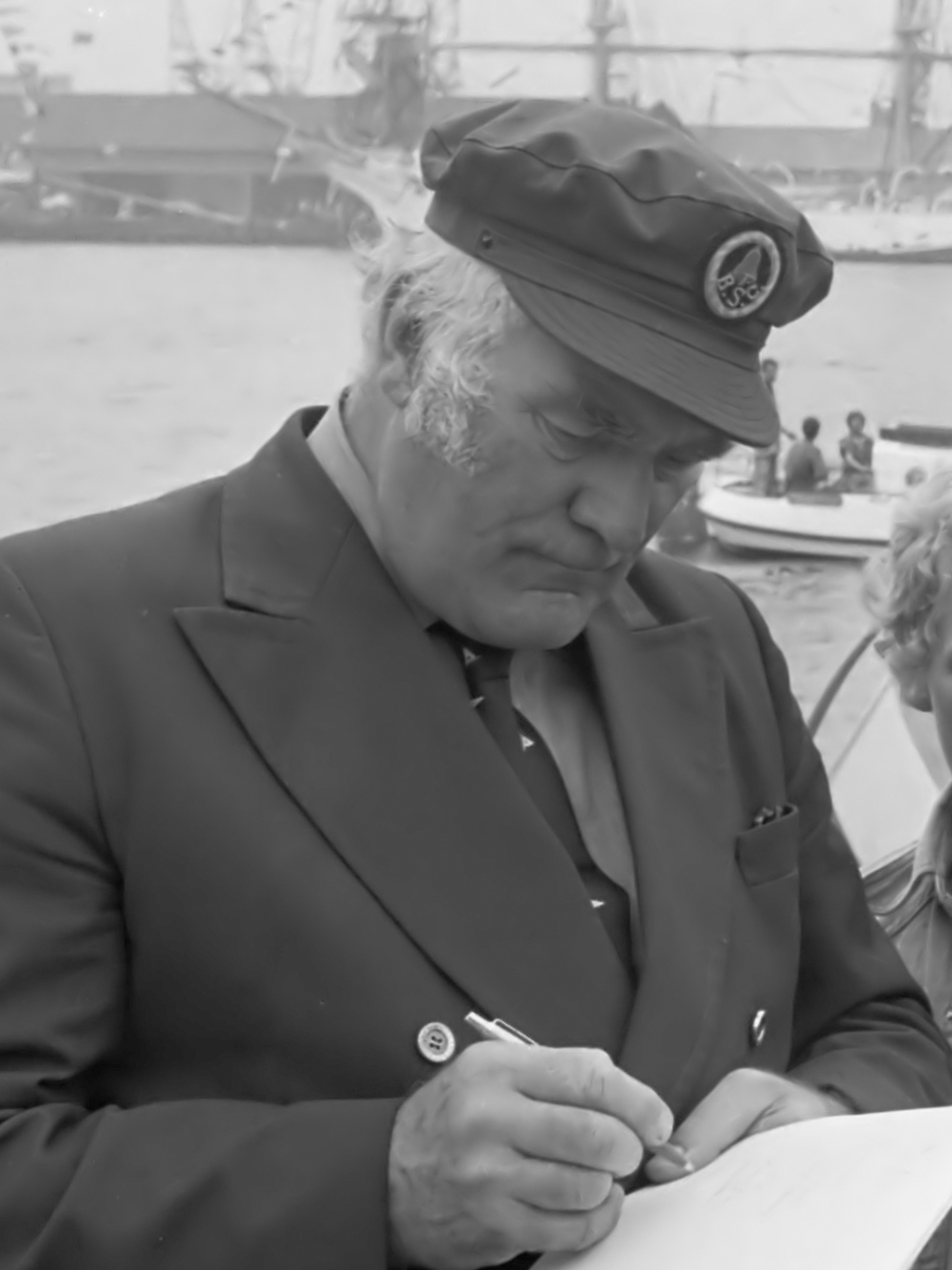
"Captain" Baines (Howard Lang)

William Baines (Howard Lang), first mate to James. Taught by Anne to read and write, he becomes a captain and serves on all of Onedin's ships. Appalled at Onedin's business dealings and treatment of ships' crews, even though he is fully prepared to use his own fists to maintain discipline, he leaves to work for a rival shipping line for a short time, but returns to Onedin.

Another falling-out leads Baines to buy his own ship, but a fire breaks out, destroying the ship and killing Tom, a boy he and James took on first as a cabin boy and then as an indentured lad. Blaming James, he leaves again, and is tricked into the plot to frame James for theft. He then helps to clear James' name. On their last voyage together, James' wife Margarita has a baby son, who is named in Baines's honour.

Lady Fogarty, Elizabeth Fogarty (née Onedin, formerly Frazer) (Jessica Benton), James's volatile sister, works in their father's shop. She is informally engaged to marry seafarer Daniel Fogarty (Michael Billington). However, she does not fancy being a sea captain's wife, and wants better things. Her head is turned by the attentions of the wealthy Albert Frazer (Philip Bond), developer of steamship technology and heir to the Frazer shipyards, a connection James soon turns to his own advantage. After a heated moment of passion aboard the "Charlotte Rhodes" with Daniel Fogarty, she falls pregnant. Against the advice of her family, she elopes with Albert. Elizabeth gives birth to a son, William Frazer, who she initially tried to raise as Albert's son. William's true parentage is accidentally revealed by James's brother, Robert, at a party for the child's first birthday. Albert agrees to raise William as his own.

The marriage is unhappy. Albert takes up with a music hall singer, Carrie Harris. Shortly before the death of Anne, the Frazers start divorce proceedings, but later reconcile. Albert takes frequent trips away on business, finally settling in South America, where he dies several years later. Elizabeth returns to the now-married Captain Fogarty. By the end of Series 3, Elizabeth is intending to run off with him to Australia, until she is informed that their plans will be financed by money that is rightfully her husband's. Having sold her house, she is left with no option but to move in with her father-in-law.

Albert's father, Jack Frazer (John Phillips) dies, leaving his shipyards and shipping line to Elizabeth for William to inherit on coming of age, so the Frazer name will live on, having discovered that William is the son of Daniel Fogarty. Elizabeth is surprisingly effective at running both the Frazer Line and the Frazer shipbuilding yards. She subsequently has a relationship with her employee, Matt Harvey. 16 years after he left, Daniel Fogarty returns from Australia, where he has amassed a fortune, and marries Elizabeth, whom he still loves, to help and advise his son, who retains the name Frazer.

Elizabeth and Daniel became estranged, as their business interests differ and he rises in political circles to become ambassador to Turkey. She refuses to go with him, and remains to run Frazer's. As time goes by, a reconciliation between Elizabeth and Daniel is in the offing as they exchange letters and Daniel resigns as ambassador. On his return to Liverpool, his ship is in a collision and he is declared missing.

Robert Onedin (Brian Rawlinson in Series 1–2 and 4–6, James Garbutt in Series 3), James's older brother, takes after their father and counts coppers in the family ship chandlery, though he later expands it into a profitable department store, after visiting the United States to see new methods of selling. He and his wife Sarah have one son, Samuel, who at first cares more for the sea and ships than for shopkeeping. Robert is elected as a member of Parliament; he and Sarah move to a smart new residence, but his life abruptly comes to an end when he chokes on a bone at a family dinner.

Sarah Onedin (Mary Webster), wife of Robert, is always looking to improve her station in life as her husband's status rises. She is upset at how her husband's brother, James, borrows money from him to further his own ambitions. When her husband dies, she and her son, Samuel, run the business. She is shocked when her son marries Charlotte after William gets her pregnant. Sarah makes attempts to contact Robert through a medium, despite her son Samuel's objections. She almost marries the fortune-hunting Captain Dampier. She is last heard of as having undertaken a tour of the world.

Letty Onedin (née Gaunt) (Jill Gascoine) is employed as governess to James's daughter Charlotte. She reconciles the two and grows to love James, while his feelings are initially repressed by memories of his first wife, Anne. Letty starts her own business, employing, at a fair wage, women whose men are out of work. James, recognizing that she is a force in her own right, softens; remembering Anne's death, they are married with his proviso that they have no children. Letty falls pregnant, which she hides from James, owing to his loss of Anne in childbirth, as did Charlotte by her cousin William, and James returns from a voyage to discover that, like Anne before, she is having a difficult childbirth. The baby, James's male heir, dies. Charlotte had a baby boy, Robert. Letty throws herself into work and builds a house for foundlings of prostitutes and destitute women, to the disbelief of prominent townsfolk. After some time, diphtheria breaks out amongst the children at the home; Letty nurses the children and dies from the disease.

Margarita Onedin (née Suarez) is the daughter of a South American politician who is killed in a revolution. James rescues her after her escape from the fighting, and quickly marries her. In the final episode of the series, during a voyage "'round the Horn", she gives birth to James's son, Will Onedin, named after Captain Baines.

=== The Cousins ===
When the series begins, Robert and Sarah's son, Samuel, has already been born. Elizabeth and Daniel's son, William, is conceived aboard the Charlotte Rhodes some months later, therefore at least a year younger than Samuel. James and Anne's daughter, Charlotte, is born at the end of Series 2. Based on the travels (including voyages to Australia, around the Horn to the American West Coast, to The Confederate States of America, some time spent recouping James' fortune by trading around the world, including to East Africa and their final race back from China against Daniel Fogarty, with tea clipper fleet) and events (a miscarriage, some time spent living separately, the setting up of Onedin Warehouses, the acquiring and loss of the Pampero and 4 different houses) that happened during James and Anne's marriage, she must be at least several years younger than Samuel and William. However, from somewhere during Series 4 and 5, the cousins have retroactively all born within months of each other and Charlotte as a young child moved between Elizabeth Fraser and Sarah Onedin' home, and her aunt Mary's homes.

Charlotte Onedin (Laura Hartong), her mother Anne died when she was born and as a young child felt rejected by her father James as the cause of the death of her mother. Reconciled with her father by Letty her governess who married her father. She fell in love with her cousin William Frazer, but he abandoned her when she became pregnant by him. Instead, she married her other cousin, Samuel Onedin, who initially loved her. She had two children, Robert (by William) and Anne (by Samuel). Following William's death, Charlotte and the now successful Samuel were increasingly unhappy and Charlotte ran off with Seth Burgess (Michael Walker), a sea captain who owed money and his ship to James. Her father pursued her and she realized that her sea captain had no feelings for her when Burgess traded the ship for her. She returned to England with her father suffering a serious head injury when hit by a falling block and tackle. Samuel divorced Charlotte, citing her infidelity with Seth Burgess and taking custody of Robert and Anne. Charlotte, after staying with her aunt, left to take up a career as an actress and music hall singer "The Lancashire Nightingale" much to the horror of her father; although alleviated by the money she was earning. When her father was in prison, she returned home to help run the business and had secret meetings with Samuel to discuss their children.

William Frazer (Marc Harrison), the result of a relationship between Elizabeth and Daniel Fogarty. Elizabeth married Albert Frazer before he was born and Albert brought him up as his own son. As a young man, he came under the influence of Josiah Beaumont (Warren Clarke), an ambitious banker. Daniel Fogarty returned to marry Elizabeth and together they thwarted the plans of Beaumont. Denied access to his son by a bitter Samuel and Charlotte. Shortly afterwards, William was killed by a runaway horse and wagon.

Samuel Onedin (Christopher Douglas), son of Robert and Sarah and heir to his father's department store. As a youngster, he grew up with William and Charlotte and was more interested in the sea and ships. He became a stowaway on one of James's ships. On his father's death, he began to run the department store with his mother. Always fond of Charlotte, he married her when she became pregnant with William's baby. Charlotte never reciprocated his feelings, leading to an acrimonious parting after she went off with a sea captain leaving her two children. After a trip to the United States, he returned with a new bride, Caroline. An heiress to a fortune, she immediately put Charlotte in her place by taking full control of the children's upbringing. When Caroline's ambitions for Samuel's election as an MP in Daniel Fogarty's seat failed, she grew colder. Samuel secretly saw Charlotte.

=== Recurring ===
Captain Joshua Webster (James Hayter), the father of Anne Onedin and the original owner of the "Charlotte Rhodes". When the series begins he is a retired Royal Navy Captain on a small pension. He has been unable to maintain the "Charlotte Rhodes" in a seaworthy condition, and now spends most of his pension on rum. Initially angry at Anne's decision to marry James, but more so at the loss of his ship, he comes to accept the situation, though he is the first to point out James' flaws. After his daughter's death he fell under the oversight of Robert and Sarah, much to their irritation. On several occasions James sent him off to conduct business, usually on ships captained by Captain Baines. The relationship between the two is usually one of comical frustration. Captain Webster is not heard of again after Series 3, so it is assumed that he died some time during the mid/late 1870s.

Thomas Callon (Edward Chapman), the owner of the Callon Line. When the series starts he was the employer of James. After James sets up the Onedin Line, in competition with the Callon Line, and subsequently takes one of Callon's most profitable contracts (to carry Señor Braganza's Portuguese wine), the two become implacable enemies. Throughout the first series Callon, aided by his son Edmund (James Warwick), attempted to ruin both James and Robert Onedin, he also promoted and relied on Daniel Fogarty. Callon finally became the majority shareholder and Chairman of the Onedin Steamship Line. At the start of Series 2 both Callon and his son are killed in a fire at the Callon warehouse. A fire which nearly kills Albert Frazer.

Emma Callon (Jane Seymour) was the niece of Thomas Callon, and after his death she inherited the Callon Line. She has little interest in running the company herself, so she employs Daniel Fogarty as General Manager, and they become close. After he seduced her, they married, their honeymoon being a race against James to China and back to gain the controlling balance of Onedin Line shares. Emma quickly grew to despise her husband and his mismanagement led her to transfer a 70% stake of the Callon Line to Jack Frazer to settle its debts and to guarantee her an income from her remaining 30% of the newly renamed Frazer Line. Daniel then decided to abandon her and run off with Elizabeth. When he returned from Australia, 16 years later, Emma was living in seclusion with consumption, dying shortly afterwards (in the early 1890s) and leaving her share of the Frazer Line to Daniel.

== The Charlotte Rhodes ==
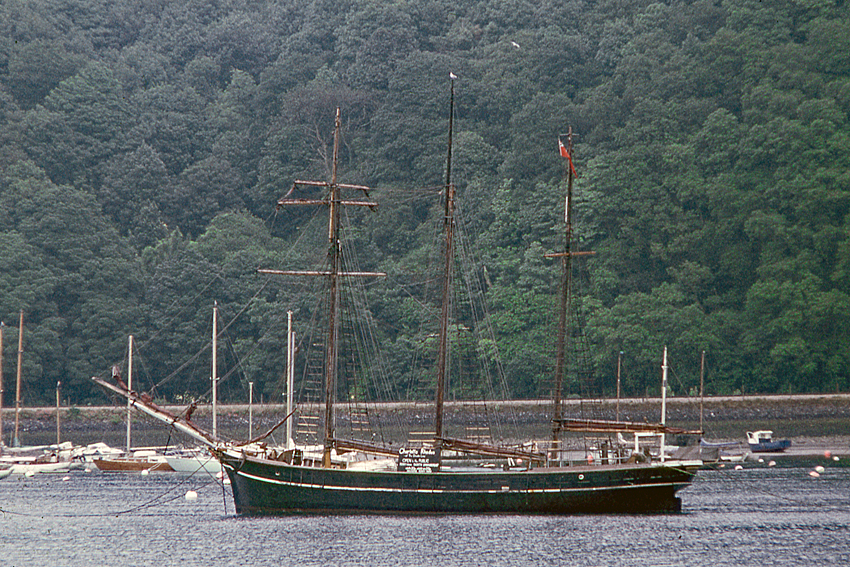
Charlotte Rhodes moored on the River Dart in 1973

In the TV series James Onedin's first ship, the Charlotte Rhodes, was portrayed by a schooner of the same name, built in 1904 in Fjellebroens Shipyard, Denmark, by F. Hoffman. She appeared in the series from 1971 until 1976. Later the ship became unseaworthy so she was dropped from the series. While some sources suggest she was replaced by another schooner called Kathleen and May, there is nothing in that ship's history to support this. The original Charlotte Rhodes was a victim of arson in October 1979 in the Netherlands before the end of the series. The first link between the Kathleen & May and the Charlotte Rhodes was not made until 2005.

=== Fictional history ===
The topsail schooner Charlotte Rhodes was originally owned by Captain Joshua Webster. His spinster daughter Anne was married by James Onedin, in order to become a ship-owner. A shrewd and often ruthless operator, James soon built up a fleet, assisted by the loyal Mr (later Captain) Baines (Howard Lang). His other sailing ships included the Pampero, the Medusa, the Søren Larsen, the ex-Portuguese slaver "Maria di Gloria", the Neptune, the Falcon, the Trident, the Osprey, the "Orphia", the "Oberon", the "Orpheus", the "Esther Lohse", the "Osiris", the steamship Shearwater, the Christian Radich, the Thorsoe, the steamer Black Pearl, the Jenny Peak renamed the Letty Gaunt, the Ondine, the Orlando, the Star of Bethlehem, the Teawynd and the Lady Lazenby. He also initiated the building of a steamship, the Anne Onedin (until the death of his wife, to be named the Golden Nugget, and briefly named the "Scotch Lass" after her dubious acquisition by Mr Frazer for the shell company, The Wirral Steam Navigation Company).

== Production ==
=== Conception ===
Series creator Cyril Abraham had originally envisaged The Onedin Line as being about a modern shipping company with its boardroom battles and seagoing adventures, but then he discovered that almost all such companies were run by boards of anonymous executives. However, he noticed that most of these companies had their origins in the 19th century, mostly started by one shrewd and far-sighted individual who, through his own business acumen, built up a shipping line from nothing. Abraham stated that James Onedin was not based on one individual but was rather an amalgamation of several characters. Suggested real-life inspirations include Victorian era shipping line owner James Baines & Co. of Liverpool (a leading character in the series was named 'Captain Baines'), Sir Samuel Cunard and various members of the Allan Line family.

An article in Woman magazine published in July 1973 featured an interview with Cyril Abraham in which he recalled how he came up with the very unusual family name Onedin. He wanted something unique. He had decided to call the leading male character James but still had not found a surname when the BBC agreed to film the story. Then some inspiration - he said:

One day I stumbled across the word Ondine, a mythological sea creature. By transposing the "e", I had James Onedin, a sea devil.

The programme was recorded in Dartmouth, Devon, as well as certain scenes in Exeter, Falmouth and Gloucester (many of the dock scenes). The last series was filmed in Pembroke Dock, Wales, where the 18th-century naval dockyard and surrounding streets became Liverpool, and various coastal locations in the Pembrokeshire area substituted for Turkey and Portugal.

Due to its popularity in Sweden, the series inspired the name for a real-life shipping line in Stockholm, the Ånedin-Linjen, founded in 1973, which until recently operated cruises in the Baltic.

=== Music ===
The music behind the opening credits of the series is an excerpt from the Adagio of Spartacus and Phrygia from the 1956 ballet Spartacus by Aram Khachaturian using a recording by the Vienna Philharmonic Orchestra conducted by the composer. Other background music includes excerpts from Ralph Vaughan Williams's Symphony No. 2 'London', Symphony No. 5 and Fantasia on a Theme of Thomas Tallis, Manuel de Falla's The Three-Cornered Hat, Gustav Holst's Fugal Overture, Gustav Mahler's Symphony No. 2 and Dmitri Shostakovich's Symphony No. 1 and Jean Sibelius's Tapiola, symphonic poem for orchestra.

Traditional music, including folk songs and sea shanties in particular, are heard in abundance throughout the series, including such songs as "The Maid of Amsterdam", "Ruben Ranzo", "South Australia", "Maggie May", "The Sailor's Hornpipe", "Botany Bay", "Drink to Me Only with Thine Eyes", "A Hundred Years Ago", "Blow the Man Down", and "On Ilkla Moor Baht 'at".

=== Vessels ===
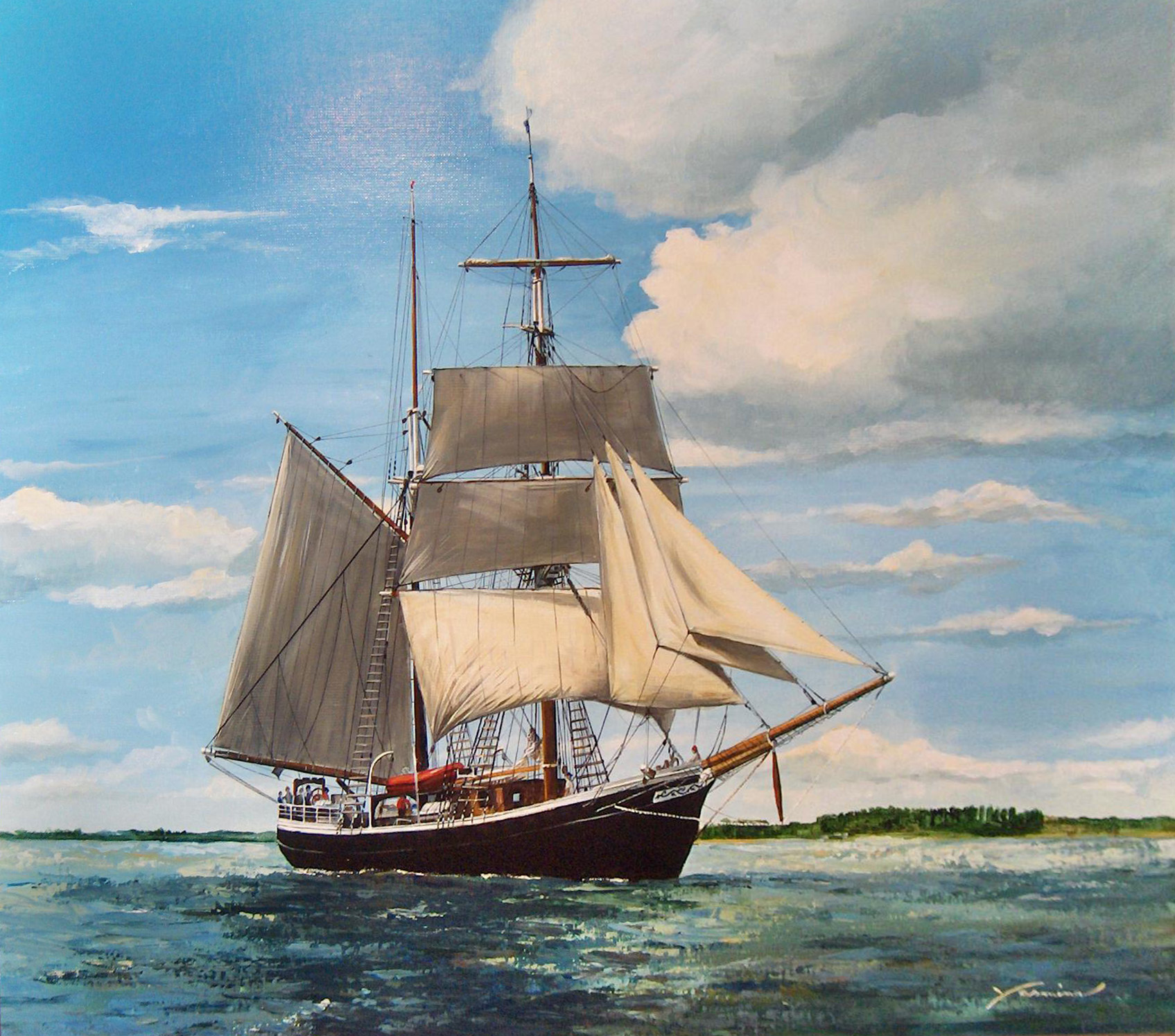
Søren Larsen, one of the ships filmed

Among the historic ships and boats featured in the series was the steam pinnace Hero, then owned and lent by John Player & Sons, and the following tall ships:

- Statsraad Lehmkuhl
- Kathleen and May playing the part of the Charlotte Rhodes (Note: "Onedin Line Tall Ship to visit North Wales". A note to this: In the pre-1976 series' episodes, the Charlotte Rhodes was indeed played by herself ("The World of The Onedin Line", copyright Alison McLeay, 1977). In 1976, the original Charlotte Rhodes required extensive maintenance to keep her seaworthy, and her owner decided to sell her to new Dutch owners; hence her disappearance from 'The Onedin Line' screen and only being mentioned by name throughout the rest of the Series' run. Charlotte Rhodes was sadly destroyed by arson in 1979. The Kathleen and May is still afloat, and bears an uncanny likeness to the Charlotte Rhodes, save that she is some 30 feet shorter than the Charlotte Rhodes dimensions given in Ms. McLeay's book. According to the Kathleen and May's history (http://www.nationalhistoricships.org.uk/register/146/kathleen-and-may), "During 1968, KATHLEEN & MAY was discovered in bad repair by the Duke of Edinburgh who created the Maritime Trust in London to help preserve her. She was bought by them in 1970 with funds given by the Hong Kong shipowner Sir Yue-Kong Pao. They began restoring her as a typical West Country schooner. In 1998, she was sold for £80,000, towed to Bideford and moored at a disused coal wharf where restoration work began." The ship's complete history encompassing from 1900 (when she was named Lizzie May until 1908) until 2011 makes no note of the Kathleen and May ever having appeared in 'The Onedin Line' Series; the above reference, Kathleen and May, concurs with this.)
- Christian Radich
- Sagres
- Søren Larsen
- Danmark
- Sir Winston Churchill - one early episode
- Gorch Fock
- Thorso
- Nora-av-Ven from Ven, Sweden. An 82 feet long twin-masted topsail schooner built in 1825. Used in Series 1.
- De Wadden The Netherlands, 1917

== Cast ==
The series made the careers of Peter Gilmore, who played James, Anne Stallybrass, who played Anne, and Howard Lang, who played Captain William Baines, as well as being an important break for Jill Gascoine (Letty Gaunt), Warren Clarke (Josiah Beaumont), Kate Nelligan (Leonora Biddulph) and Jane Seymour (Emma Callon). Peter Gilmore and Anne Stallybass got married in 1987 and remained together until his death in 2013.

Other regular cast members included Jessica Benton (Elizabeth Frazer), Brian Rawlinson and James Garbutt (Robert Onedin), Mary Webster, (Sarah Onedin), Michael Billington / Tom Adams (Daniel Fogarty).

Other featured cast members included Philip Bond (Albert Frazer), Edward Chapman (Thomas Callon), James Warwick (Edmund Callon), John Phillips (Jack Frazer), Caroline Harris (Caroline Maudslay), James Hayter (Captain Joshua Webster), Ken Hutchison (Matt Harvey), Laura Hartong (Charlotte Onedin), Marc Harrison (William Frazer), Christopher Douglas (Samuel Onedin), Roberta Iger (Margarita Onedin), Jenny Twigge (Caroline Onedin), Cyril Shaps (Braganza), Hilda Braid (Miss Simmonds), David Garfield (Samuel Plimsoll), Robert James (Rowland Biddulph), Sylvia Coleridge (Mrs Salt), Sonia Dresdel (Lady Lazenby), Nicolette Roeg (Ada Gamble), John Rapley (Dunwoody), Stephanie Bidmead (Mrs Darling), John Sharp (Uncle Percy Spendilow), Heather Canning (Mrs Arkwright), Keith Jayne (Tom Arnold), Frederick Jaeger (Max van der Rheede), Edward Judd (Manuel Ortega), Elizabeth Chambers (Miss Gladstone), Jack Watson (Dr Darling), Paul Lavers (Francis Polter/David Teal) and Maurice Colbourne (Viscount Marston).

Victoria Thomas is a child actress who played Charlotte Onedin in Month of the Albatross, A Clear Conscience and Undercurrent.

== Novels ==
There are six novels based on the series.

The first five are all by the series creator, Cyril Abraham:

- The Shipmaster (1972) ISBN 9780426071143
- The Iron Ships (1974) ISBN 9780426132660
- The High Seas (1975) ISBN 9780855230456
- The Trade Winds (1977) ISBN 9780426172673
- The White Ships (1979) ISBN 9780352304001

The books are not straightforward novelisations of the television episodes, since the author introduced additional material and also changed a number of details, though dialogue from the series that Abraham had penned himself is utilised. In print, Elizabeth's child is conceived in a private room above a restaurant, not on the Charlotte Rhodes; George Callon lasted considerably longer and died in bed after suffering a stroke, not in a warehouse fire; Emma was Callon's daughter, not his niece;

Captain Webster remarried, his new partner being the irrepressible old crone Widow Malloy, an entertaining character with a repertoire of coarse remarks; Albert did not abscond to Patagonia but died aboard ship following his involvement in retrieving a kidnapped Elizabeth from Daniel Fogarty; Caroline Maudslay and Matt Harvey were omitted altogether (though Matt did appear in two short stories - see below); Jack Frazer's life was extended and he lived to see both Emma's death and Daniel's return from Australia, though his television discovery that William was not his grandson never took place.

The sixth novel, The Turning Tide (1980) ISBN 9780352305732, was written by Bruce Stewart. This deviated even more from the television series and probably from Cyril Abraham's intentions as well. Letty was depicted as a jealous harpy aiming unpleasant remarks at Charlotte; Elizabeth and Daniel ended up emigrating to Australia permanently and James became the owner of the Frazer Line.

A series of Onedin short stories by Cyril Abraham, set between Series Two and Series Three, appeared in Woman magazine in 1973: For The Love Of A Lady; Amelia; The Woman from the Streets; The Mistress and the Wife and The Choice. The plots involved: two seamen who were rivals for the same woman; Robert's encounter with the attractive Amelia; an appearance by Sarah's destitute sister Constance; a social gathering that revolves around the naming of the first Onedin steamship; and the first appearance in James' life of Leonora Biddulph.

A later tale by Abraham, For Love of the Onedins, appeared in a short-lived magazine called tvlife. This story, covering Leonora's wedding, occurs between Series Three and Series Four and features Matt Harvey, who was Elizabeth's love interest during the fourth series. There is a slanging match between Elizabeth and Sarah, who each disparage the circumstances of the other's wedding day until Leonora intervenes to restore peace.

A final story was published in the Daily Mirror, entitled Cat and Mouse. It was set during Series Four and Matt Harvey made his second appearance in print.

Cyril Abraham had planned to write a whole series of novels about the Onedin Line, but he died in 1979 after completing the fifth novel, The White Ships. The story was eventually to have seen James and Elizabeth as two wizened old autocrats, both determined not to relinquish their hold on the shipping business. James would have died as a very old man, leaving the family divided over control of the company. Cyril Abraham had intended the Onedin saga to continue right up to the 1970s.

== Additional books ==
In June 1977, "The World of The Onedin Line" by Alison McLeay was published. The hardback book (ISBN 978-0715373989) was a historical and factual look at the world and places in which The Onedin Line was set.

Peter Graham Scott's autobiography British Television: An Insider's Story (McFarland & Company, 2000) includes a full (25-page) chapter on the setting-up of the series and his time as producer (and occasional director/writer) on the first 42 episodes, along with six behind-the-scenes black-and-white photos.

== Broadcasts ==
The pilot was produced by Anthony Coburn and was broadcast as a one-off BBC Drama Playhouse production on 7 December 1970. It was announced in September 2010 that a copy of the pilot episode was discovered in the American Library of Congress, however this report turned out to be inaccurate and it remains lost. The story and the cast were basically the same as the resulting series with the exception of Sheila Allen playing Anne Webster/Onedin; Anne Stallybrass took over the part for the series. The series was originally aired in the United Kingdom by the BBC, from 15 October 1971 to 26 October 1980. In the Netherlands, broadcasts started in 1972.

In the mid 1980s, the BBC repeated the series in a daytime slot. From 1992 UK Gold repeated the series in full, ending repeats in 1998, before moving to sister channel UK Gold Classics in October 1998 when that channel was launched, although it was only available on Sky Digital on weekends between 6pm-2am and the showing only lasted around six months.

In 2000 it reappeared on UK Drama and has been repeated in full on that channel in more recent years. In 2007 MAX restarted a broadcast of the first series, with one episode every weekday (Monday through Friday), starting 10 July 2007. The UK digital channel Yesterday began running the whole series from 27 July 2010. As with many of the vintage series run by the channel, the episodes are slightly cut, from the c.50m length standard in the 1970s to the c.46m standard on Yesterday. As of 6 January 2018, the UKTV channel Drama began repeating the series from the first episode at the rate of four episodes a week. Talking Pictures TV started a weekly repeat on 4 September 2022.

== Popularity in communist Romania ==
Gilmore's signature (as Onedin) in an autograph for the Romanian paper Scînteia Tineretului, December 1978

Among other TV shows from the West like Poldark and Dallas, The Onedin Line was a huge success in communist Romania in the late seventies and early eighties, when it was broadcast by Romanian TV. Eventually it was discontinued (together with other popular television shows) in favour of the omnipresent state propaganda designed to show off the successes of dictator Nicolae Ceaușescu. Consequently, to flee this propaganda the population tuned into foreign stations (if possible) to continue watching their favourite shows but also to receive uncensored news about events like the fall of the Berlin Wall. This can be considered as a small contribution to the uprising which brought down the Ceaușescu regime.

== Home media ==
Home video versions of the series have been made available in various versions over the years. For series one, edited versions were made available by BBC Video on VHS in the 1990s. These edited masters saw a re-release in the UK on DVD from Universal Playback in 2003. The Australian (from ABC) and Dutch (from Memphis Belle) DVD versions of series one also derive from these edited versions. In North America, Canadian company BFS Video released the first four episodes uncut on VHS in 2001, with these and the next four episodes arriving on DVD in two double-disc sets two years later.

It would not be until 2007 that all 15 episodes of the first series became available uncut on DVD, in the UK from 2 entertain in a four-disc set.

Series two follows a similar pattern, with edited versions arriving on VHS and DVD in the UK from the same companies listed above. The version from the Netherlands is sourced from the same masters. The Australian version, however, has all 14 episodes uncut on four discs, and was released in 2008. All 14 episodes on four discs were released uncut in the UK in 2010.

Series three to eight are available on DVD from Memphis Belle in the Netherlands, and all are uncut. All series are also available in Germany.

Series three and four are available uncut in the UK and Australia. Series five, six, seven and eight are yet to be released in the UK, but all eight series have been released in Germany under the title "Die Onedin Linie: Die Komplette Serie", where English language audio is available in the menu, but the credits on the episodes are in German, as are all the extras and information cards.

All current DVD editions are uncut, apart from the Australian series one and the Dutch series one and two. The earlier edited UK versions of the first two series are still available from a number of sites.

== See also ==
- George Worsley Adamson, who made a drypoint print in 1980 entitled "Filming The Onedin Line" a print of which is in the Royal Albert Memorial Museum (RAMM), Exeter (accession no. 215/1981)
