= The Maritime Heritage Trust =

British maritime preservation charity

Maritime Heritage Trust
- Predecessor: The Maritime Trust (1969); Heritage Afloat (1994)
- Formation: 1969; 57 years ago (as The Maritime Trust)
- Founder: Prince Philip, Duke of Edinburgh; Frank G. G. Carr
- Type: Charitable Incorporated Organisation (CIO)
- Registration no.: "The Maritime Heritage Trust, registered charity no. 268609". Charity Commission for England and Wales.
- Legal status: Active
- Purpose: Preservation of historic vessels, maritime infrastructure, and skills
- Headquarters: Hermitage Moorings, Wapping, London, UK
- Region served: United Kingdom
- Affiliations: European Maritime Heritage (EMH)
- Website: www.maritimeheritage.org.uk

The Maritime Heritage Trust (MHT), formerly The Maritime Trust, is a British charitable organisation dedicated to the preservation of historic vessels, traditional maritime skills, and historic port infrastructure in the United Kingdom.

Established in 1969 as The Maritime Trust by Prince Philip, Duke of Edinburgh, and Frank G. G. Carr, the organisation acquired, restored, and displayed a fleet of British museum ships during the 1970s and 1980s, including Cutty Sark, RRS Discovery, HMS Gannet, HMS Warrior, Kathleen and May, Lydia Eva, and SS Robin. Following the transfer of its ship-owning responsibilities to local preservation trusts, it merged with the maritime advocacy group Heritage Afloat to form the Maritime Heritage Trust in 2011. Alongside National Historic Ships and Historic England, the trust co-manages the UK Heritage Harbours programme.

== History ==
=== The Maritime Trust (1969–2000s) ===
In 1968, a committee chaired by Prince Philip, Duke of Edinburgh, met to examine the preservation of the ironclad HMS Warrior and other surviving historic vessels; following the restoration of Cutty Sark at Greenwich, Frank G. G. Carr, former director of the National Maritime Museum, and Prince Philip established The Maritime Trust in 1969. Prince Philip served as the trust's president, and Robert Grosvenor, 5th Duke of Westminster, served as its inaugural chairman. Conceived as a maritime equivalent to the National Trust, its remit was to inspect, acquire, restore, and display vessels of historical and technical significance across the United Kingdom.

By 1972, the trust's Founding Fund had raised over £1 million. Its Ships Committee compiled a national inventory of surviving historic British vessels and established conservation standards, acting as a precursor to the National Historic Ships committee. Throughout the 1970s and 1980s, the trust intervened to prevent the scrapping of approximately 20 British vessels, ranging from major warships and coastal steamers to regional working craft. From the late 1970s until 1986, seven of its vessels (Robert Falcon Scott's Antarctic exploration ship RRS Discovery, the coastal steamer SS Robin, the steam drifter Lydia Eva, the topsail schooner Kathleen and May, the Thames barge Cambria, the steam tug Portwey, and the lightvessel Nore) were assembled and opened to the public as the Historic Ship Collection at St Katharine Docks in London.

Maintaining the fleet at St Katharine Docks proved financially unsustainable and the collection was dispersed during the mid-to-late 1980s to regional ports and specialist single-vessel trusts with local community backing. In 1989, The Maritime Trust merged its administrative operations with the Cutty Sark Society, operating as the Cutty Sark Maritime Trust. Ownership of its remaining ships was progressively transferred to independent preservation charities during the 1990s and 2000s.

=== Heritage Afloat and merger ===
In 1994, vessel preservation groups established Heritage Afloat, a national umbrella body advocating for public policy recognition and funding for historic vessels in the United Kingdom. Parliamentary lobbying by Heritage Afloat and allied maritime organisations contributed to the creation of the National Historic Ships Committee and its successor body, National Historic Ships UK, in 2006.

Following the divestment of its fleet, The Maritime Trust merged with Heritage Afloat to form the Maritime Heritage Trust, retaining The Maritime Trust's 1975 charitable registration.

== Governance ==
The Maritime Heritage Trust is registered with the Charity Commission for England and Wales (Charity No. 268609), with its registered office at Hermitage Moorings in Wapping, London. Its charitable objects are to provide facilities for the repair, reconstruction, conservation, and berthing of historic vessels and associated maritime structures, artefacts, and records, and to promote public education and social benefit through maritime heritage.

== Activities ==
=== Advocacy and sector support ===
The trust operates as a member-led campaign and advocacy body representing historic vessel owners, maritime museums, and preservation societies to government departments, regulatory agencies, and port authorities. It serves as a United Kingdom member organisation of European Maritime Heritage (EMH), a non-governmental body representing private vessel owners and maritime museums across Europe, and organises technical webinars and study visits for vessel operators.

=== Heritage Harbours ===
In partnership with National Historic Ships UK (through its Shipshape Network) and Historic England, the trust co-manages the Heritage Harbours and Heritage Inland Ports initiative. Modelled on European museum harbours in the Netherlands, Belgium, Germany, and France, the programme recognises and supports working coastal and inland ports that retain historic maritime infrastructure, such as slipways, dry docks, and boatbuilding yards, to safeguard operational berths, traditional skills, and repair facilities for historic vessels. Recognised locations in the network include Faversham Creek, Ramsgate, Sandwich, Exeter, Ipswich, and Bideford.

== Vessels owned or supported (1969–2000s) ==
Between 1969 and the 2000s, The Maritime Trust directly acquired, restored, or managed a fleet of historic vessels, several of which formed the Historic Ship Collection at St Katharine Docks, and provided capital grants or fundraising advisory support to independent ship preservation projects across the United Kingdom. Most of these vessels are recorded on the National Register of Historic Vessels (NRHV), with those of pre-eminent national significance designated as part of the National Historic Fleet (NHF).

Historic vessels owned, managed, or supported by The Maritime Trust
Vessel (built)	Type	Role	Registration status	Details and subsequent disposition
Barnabas (1881)	Cornish dipping lugger	Owned and restored	National Register of Historic Vessels	Acquired by the trust and later transferred to the Cornish Maritime Trust (1999); based at Newlyn.
HMS Belfast (1938)	Town-class light cruiser	Grant and advisory	National Historic Fleet	Secured donor funding in 1971 to establish the HMS Belfast Trust prior to transfer to the Imperial War Museum in 1978.
Cambria (1906)	Thames sailing barge	Owned and restored	National Historic Fleet	Purchased in 1971 for display at St Katharine Docks; transferred to the Cambria Trust for restoration.
HMS Cavalier (1944)	C-class destroyer	Grant and advisory	National Historic Fleet	Provided financial support to establish the preservation trust; subsequently preserved at Chatham Historic Dockyard.
Cutty Sark (1869)	Tea clipper	Managed	National Historic Fleet	Assumed management in 1973 and merged with the Cutty Sark Society in 1989; transferred to the Cutty Sark Trust in 2000.
RRS Discovery (1901)	Auxiliary steam barque	Owned and restored	National Historic Fleet	Acquired in 1976, restored, and displayed at St Katharine Docks; transferred to the Dundee Heritage Trust in 1985.
HMS Gannet (1878)	Doterel-class sloop-of-war	Owned and restored	National Historic Fleet	Acquired for preservation and cleared of her dormitory superstructure; transferred to the Chatham Historic Dockyard Trust in 1987.
Glenlee (1896)	Steel barque	Grant and advisory	National Historic Fleet	Assisted with UK re-registration and early preservation; operated by the Clyde Maritime Trust in Glasgow.
SS Great Britain (1843)	Passenger steamship	Grant and advisory	National Historic Fleet	Provided funding and fundraising strategy support for phase two of her restoration in Bristol.
Kathleen and May (1900)	Three-masted topsail schooner	Owned and restored	National Historic Fleet	Acquired in 1970 and exhibited at Plymouth and St Katharine Docks; sold for private restoration in 1998.
Lydia Eva (1930)	Steam herring drifter	Owned and restored	National Historic Fleet	Acquired in 1971 and displayed at St Katharine Docks (1978–1986); transferred to the Lydia Eva & Mincarlo Charitable Trust.
Mary Rose (1511)	Tudor carrack	Grant and advisory	National Historic Fleet	Funded early underwater archaeological excavations prior to the raising of the hull in 1982.
Nore (1931)	Lightvessel	Owned and displayed	National Register of Historic Vessels	Exhibited at St Katharine Docks from 1974; sold into private ownership on the River Medway in 1996.
Portwey (1927)	Twin-screw steam tugboat	Owned and restored	National Historic Fleet	Gifted in 1982 and displayed at St Katharine Docks; transferred to the Steam Tug Portwey Trust (2000) and Steam Boat Trust (2025).
Provident (1924)	Brixham trawler	Owned and restored	National Historic Fleet	Acquired in 1971 and chartered back to the Island Cruising Club; refitted and sold to the Island Trust in 1993.
SS Robin (1890)	Coastal steamship	Owned and restored	National Historic Fleet	Purchased from Spanish breakers in 1974 and steamed to St Katharine Docks; transferred to the SS Robin Trust.
St Michael's Mount State Barge (c. 1740)	State barge	Grant and advisory	Unregistered	Funded restoration of Lord St Levan's ceremonial barge at St Michael's Mount, Cornwall.
Thalatta (1906)	Thames sailing barge	Grant and advisory	National Historic Fleet	Assisted the Leche Trust with the purchase and preservation of the spritsail barge for the East Coast Sail Trust.
HMS Unicorn (1824)	Leda-class frigate	Grant and advisory	National Historic Fleet	Provided financial and fundraising strategy support to the Unicorn Preservation Society in Dundee.
HMS Warrior (1860)	Armoured frigate	Owned and restored	National Historic Fleet	Handed over to the trust in 1979 with Manifold Trust backing; transferred to the Warrior Preservation Trust in 1983 and displayed at Portsmouth Historic Dockyard.

== See also ==
- National Historic Ships
- National Historic Fleet
- List of museum ships
