= Anne Stallybrass =

British actress (1938–2021)

- Born: Jacqueline Anne Stallybrass; 4 December 1938; Westcliff-on-Sea, Essex, England
- Died: 3 July 2021 (aged 82)
- Education: St. Bernard's Convent, Westcliff; Royal Academy of Music
- Occupation: Actor
- Years active: 1960–2015
- Spouses: Roger Rowland (m. 1963, divorced); Peter Gilmore (m. 1987; died 2013)

Jacqueline Anne Stallybrass (4 December 1938 – 3 July 2021) was an English actress who trained at the Royal Academy of Music in London. The television roles for which she is best known are Jane Seymour in The Six Wives of Henry VIII (1970) and Anne Onedin in The Onedin Line (1971–1972). In the 1990s, Stallybrass played Dr Kate Rowan's Aunt Eileen in Heartbeat (Season 3 episode 5 and Seasons 5–7).

== Biography ==
Stallybrass was born in Westcliff-on-Sea, Essex, on 4 December 1938, (Note: The Guardian obituary indicates she was born in Rochford, Essex) to Edward Lindsay Stallybrass (1905–1990) and Annie Isobel (née Peacock) Stallybrass (1911–1981), who married in 1933 in Hackney, London. She was educated at St Bernard's Convent, Westcliff and spent three years training at the Royal Academy of Music, where she won the Drama Gold Medal. She began her professional acting career by spending several years in repertory, gaining experience in Folkestone Kent, with the Arthur Brough Players, before moving to Nottingham and then to Sheffield.

The television roles for which she is best known are: Jane Seymour in The Six Wives of Henry VIII (1970), and Anne Onedin in The Onedin Line (1971-1972), written by Cyril Abraham. In 1973 she appeared as a narrator in five episodes of the BBC children's television series Jackanory. She also appeared as Doreen Haskins, wife of DCI Frank Haskins in the 1970s British police drama The Sweeney. She had a minor role at the very end of the Hammer film Countess Dracula.

Other major roles include Anna Strauss in The Strauss Family (1972), Susan Henchard in The Mayor of Casterbridge (1978 adaptation), and Muriel Thomas in The Old Devils (1992). From 1995 until 1998 she played Eileen Reynolds in ITV's period police drama Heartbeat. She portrayed Queen Elizabeth II, for Diana: Her True Story (1993), the made for TV mini-series from Andrew Morton's biography. Being a monarchist, she was initially unsure about taking the role, although her family used to tease her for bearing a resemblance to the Queen. She appeared in Midsomer Murders "Strangler's Wood" (1999) as Emily Meakham. She was twice nominated for the British Academy Television Award for Best Actress; for her portrayals of Anne Onedin and Anna Strauss.

== Personal life ==
Stallybrass married twice and was unable to have children. She described this as "something I have learnt to live with. I take great joy in my three godchildren and have kept in touch with all the 'television children' I have had. She met her first husband Roger Rowland in Nottingham; the couple married in 1963, separated after nine years of marriage and later divorced. Peter Gilmore's second marriage broke up not long after and the friendship between the two Onedin Line actors gradually developed. In 1987, after 10 years together the couple married and remained together until Gilmore's death in February 2013. They lived in Barnes, London, and owned a cottage, named Onedin House, in Dartmouth, which was used as a film location for scenes in The Onedin Line.

She died on 3 July 2021, at the age of 82.
