= Hero (pinnace) =

History

United Kingdom
- Name: Hero
- Builder: Andrews of Maidenhead
- Launched: 1895

General characteristics
- Type: Pinnace
- Installed power: Steam

Hero is a steam-powered pinnace, a small boat of the type used, for example, as a tender to larger vessels, believed to have been built as an electric launch, by Andrews of Maidenhead, England in 1895, with the name Avondale.

She is made from teak on steamed oak ribs laid in the carvel style, with a clipper bow, counter stern and a wooden canopy on 10 brass stanchions. Her overall length is 35 feet (11 m), beam 5 feet 8 inches (1.73 m) and draft 2 feet (0.61 m).

The vessel reportedly attended the Cookham regatta in 1901 and was known to be electrically powered in 1912. She was converted to run on petrol by the late 1960s, after which, she was again converted, to run on steam, with a Merryweather boiler. It was in this state that she was acquired by John Player & Sons, who used her for promotional purposes, and lent her to the producers of the television series The Onedin Line, in which she was featured. She also appeared in the series Edward the Seventh.

Players also installed an oil fired scotch dry back boiler. The vessel was acquired by its current owner Nigel Thomson in 1996, who again replaced the boiler, with one built 1998 by D.& S. Steam Engineering Ltd of Raunds, Northamptonshire.
