= HMS Warrior (1860) =

Warrior-class ironclad steamship of the Royal Navy (in service 1861–83)

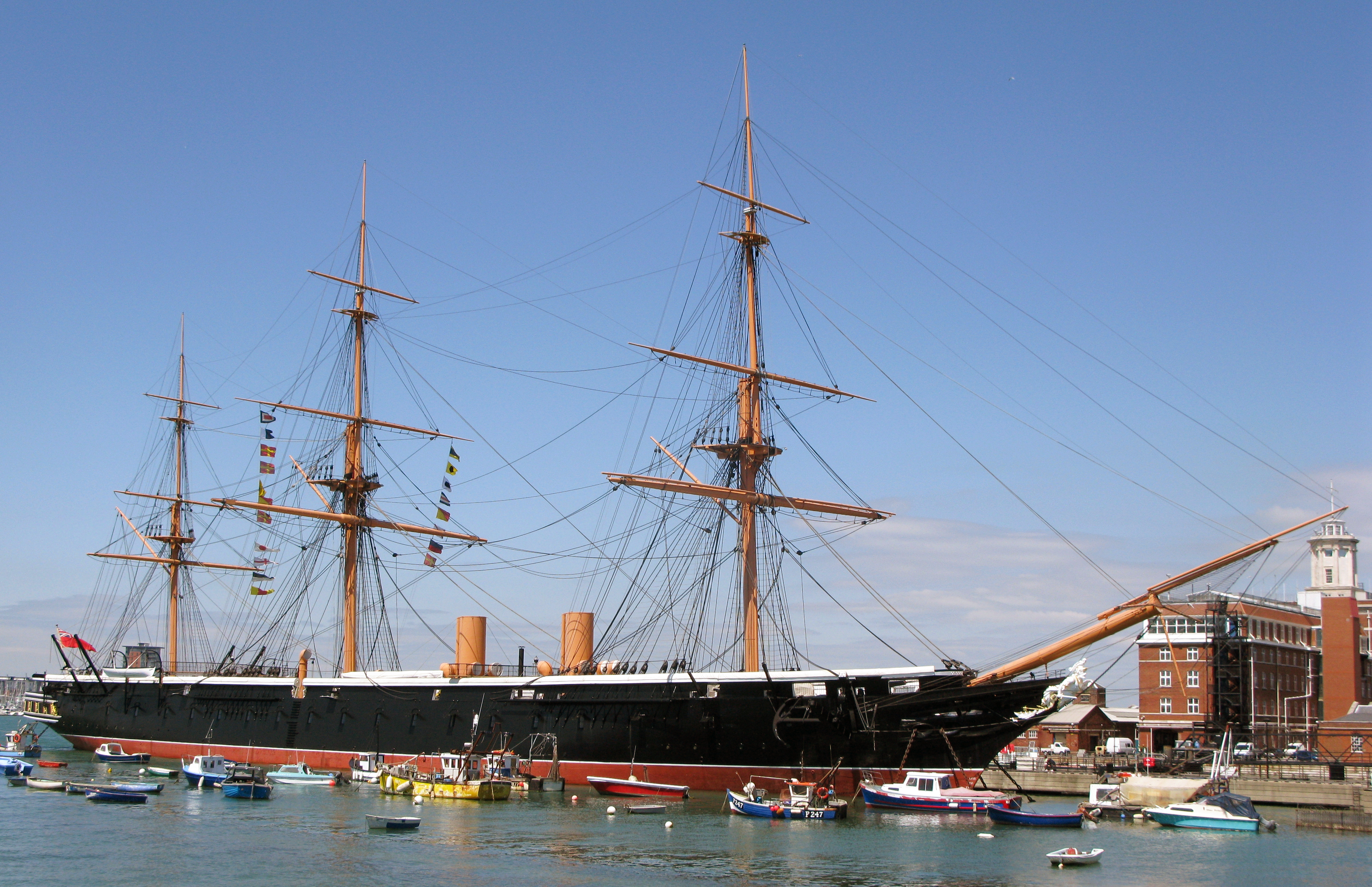
- Warrior

History

United Kingdom
- Name: Warrior
- Ordered: 11 May 1859
- Builder: Thames Ironworks and Shipbuilding Company, Blackwall, London
- Cost: £377,292
- Laid down: after 6 June 1859
- Launched: 29 December 1860
- Completed: 24 October 1861
- Commissioned: 1 August 1861
- Decommissioned: 31 May 1883
- Renamed: Vernon III, March 1904; Warrior, 1 October 1923; Oil Fuel Hulk C77, 27 August 1942; HMS Warrior (1860), 1985
- Status: Museum ship (50°47′54″N 01°06′32″W)

General characteristics
- Class & type: Warrior-class armoured frigate
- Displacement: 9,137 long tons (9,284 t)
- Length: 420 ft (128.0 m) (o/a)
- Beam: 58 ft 4 in (17.8 m)
- Draught: 26 ft 10 in (8.2 m)
- Installed power: 10 rectangular boilers; 5,772 indicated horsepower (4,304 kW)
- Propulsion: 1 shaft; 1 Trunk steam engine
- Sail plan: Ship rig
- Speed: 14 knots (26 km/h; 16 mph)
- Range: 2,100 nmi (3,900 km; 2,400 mi) at 11 kn (20 km/h; 13 mph)
- Complement: 706 officers and ratings
- Armament: 26 × Smoothbore muzzle-loading 68-pdr (206 mm) guns; 10 × Rifled breechloading 110-pdr (178 mm) guns; 4 × Rifled breechloading 40-pdr (121 mm) guns
- Armour: Belt: 4.5 in (114 mm); Bulkheads: 4.5 in (114 mm)

HMS Warrior is a 40-gun steam-powered armoured frigate built for the Royal Navy in 1859–1861. She was the name ship of the Warrior-class ironclads. Warrior and her sister ship HMS Black Prince were the first armour-plated, iron-hulled warships, and were built in response to France's launching in 1859 of the first ocean-going ironclad warship, the wooden-hulled Gloire. Warrior conducted a publicity tour of Great Britain in 1863 and spent her active career with the Channel Squadron. Obsolescent following the 1873 commissioning of the mastless and more capable HMS Devastation, she was placed in reserve in 1875, and was "paid off" – decommissioned – in 1883.

She subsequently served as a storeship and depot ship, and in 1904 was assigned to the Royal Navy's torpedo training school. The ship was converted into an oil jetty in 1927 and remained in that role until 1979, at which point she was donated by the Navy to The Maritime Trust for restoration. The restoration process took eight years, during which many of her features and fittings were either restored or recreated. When this was finished she returned to Portsmouth as a museum ship. Listed as part of the National Historic Fleet, Warrior has been based in Portsmouth since 1987.

== Background ==
The launching of the steam-powered ship of the line Napoléon by France in 1850 began an arms race between France and Britain that lasted for a decade. The destruction of a wooden Ottoman fleet by a Russian fleet firing explosive shells in the Battle of Sinop, early in the Crimean War, followed by the destruction of Russian coastal fortifications during the Battle of Kinburn in the Crimean War by French armoured floating batteries, and tests against armour plates, showed the superiority of ironclads over unarmoured ships. France's launching in 1859 of the first ocean-going ironclad warship, the wooden-hulled Gloire, upset the balance of power by neutralising the British investment in wooden ships of the line and started an invasion scare in Britain, as the Royal Navy lacked any ships that could counter Gloire and her two sisters. The situation was perceived to be so serious that Queen Victoria asked the Admiralty if the navy was adequate for the tasks that it would have to perform in wartime. Warrior and her sister were ordered in response.

The Admiralty initially specified that the ship should be capable of 15 kn (28 km/h; 17 mph), and have a full set of sails for worldwide cruising range. Iron construction was chosen as it gave the best trade-off between speed and protection; an iron hull was lighter than a wooden one of the same size and shape, giving more capacity for guns, armour and engines.

== Design and description ==
=== Overview ===
The Chief Constructor of the Navy Isaac Watts and the Chief Engineer Thomas Lloyd designed the ship. To minimise risk they copied the hull design of the large wooden frigate HMS Mersey, modifying it for iron construction and to accommodate an armoured box, or citadel, amidships along the single gun deck, which protected most of the ship's guns. Ships with this configuration of guns and armour are classified as broadside ironclads.

The Warrior-class design used many well-proven technologies that had been used in ocean-going ships for years, including her iron hull, marine steam engine, and screw propeller; only her wrought-iron armour was a major technological advance. Naval architect and historian David K. Brown wrote, "What made [Warrior] truly novel was the way in which these individual aspects were blended together, making her the biggest and most powerful warship in the world." Faster, better armoured and harder to hit than her rivals, she was superior to any existing naval ship. The Admiralty stopped construction of all wooden ships of the line, and ordered another 11 ironclads over the next few years. Jacky Fisher, who was the ship's gunnery lieutenant in 1863–1864, later wrote that most people did not realise at the time what a significant change it would bring about: "It certainly was not appreciated that this, our first armourclad ship of war, would cause a fundamental change in what had been in vogue for something like a thousand years."

Although built in response to Gloire, the Warrior had a very different operational concept from the French ship, which was meant to replace wooden ships of the line. The Warriors were designed by Watts as 40-gun armoured frigates, not intended to stand in the line of battle, as the Admiralty was uncertain about their ability to withstand concentrated fire from wooden two- and three-deck ships of the line. Unlike Gloire, they were planned to be fast enough to force battle on a fleeing enemy and to control to their own advantage the range at which a battle was fought. In contrast to Gloire's square profile, Warrior has a clipper bow, but she is twice as long as a typical clipper ship.

HMS Warrior is 380 ft 2 in (115.9 m) long between perpendiculars and 420 ft (128.0 m) long overall. She has a beam of 58 ft 4 in (17.8 m) and a draught of 26 ft 9 in (8.2 m). The ship displaces 9,137 long tons (9,284 t) and has a tonnage of 6,109 tons burthen. The ship's length made her relatively unmanoeuvrable, making it harder for her to use her strengthened stem for ramming, an ancient tactic that was coming back into use at the time. The ends of the hull are subdivided by watertight transverse bulkheads and decks into 92 compartments, and the hull has a double bottom underneath the engine and boiler rooms.

=== Armament ===
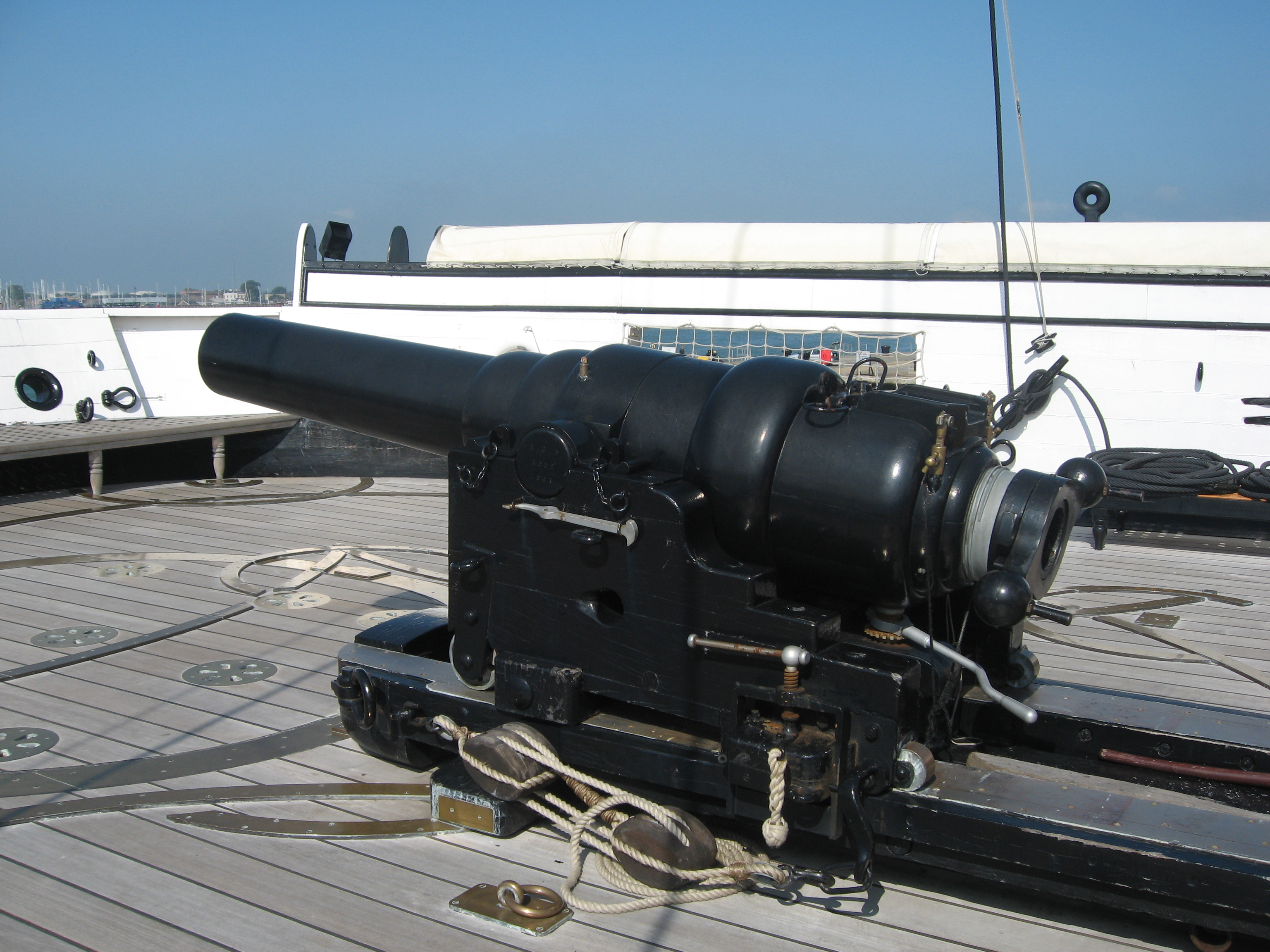
One of the replica 110-pounder breech-loaders on the restored Warrior

The armament of the Warrior-class ships was originally intended to be 40 68-pounder guns, a smoothbore muzzle-loading design, 19 on each side on the main deck and one each fore and aft as chase guns on the upper deck. The 7.9 in (201 mm) 68-pounder had a range of 3,200 yd (2,900 m) with (solid) round shot. During construction the armament was changed to include 10 Armstrong 110-pounder guns, an early rifled breech loader (RBL) design, along with 26 68-pounders, and four RBL Armstrong 40-pounder guns with a calibre of 4.75 in (121 mm) and a maximum range of 3,800 yd (3,500 m). It had been planned to replace all the 68-pounders with the innovative 110-pounder, whose 7 in (178 mm) shell could reach 4,000 yd (3,700 m), but poor results in armour-penetration tests halted this. During the first use in action of a 110-pounder aboard HMS Euryalus in 1863, the gun was incorrectly loaded and the vent piece was blown out of the breech when fired. They were labour-intensive to load and fire, and were henceforth only used with a reduced propellant charge, which left them ineffective against ironclad ships.

All the guns could fire either solid shot or explosive shells. The 68-pounders could also fire molten iron shells, filled with iron melted in a furnace between the two forward boilers. The 40-pounder Armstrong guns were replaced with a better design of the same calibre in 1863. Warrior's original armament was replaced during her 1864–1867 refit with 24 7-inch and four 8 in (203 mm) rifled muzzle-loading (RML) guns. The ship also received four RBL Armstrong 20-pounders for use as saluting guns. The RML 8-inch gun could penetrate 9.6 in (244 mm) of wrought iron armour at the muzzle, and the RML 7-inch gun could pierce 7.7 in (196 mm).

=== Armour ===
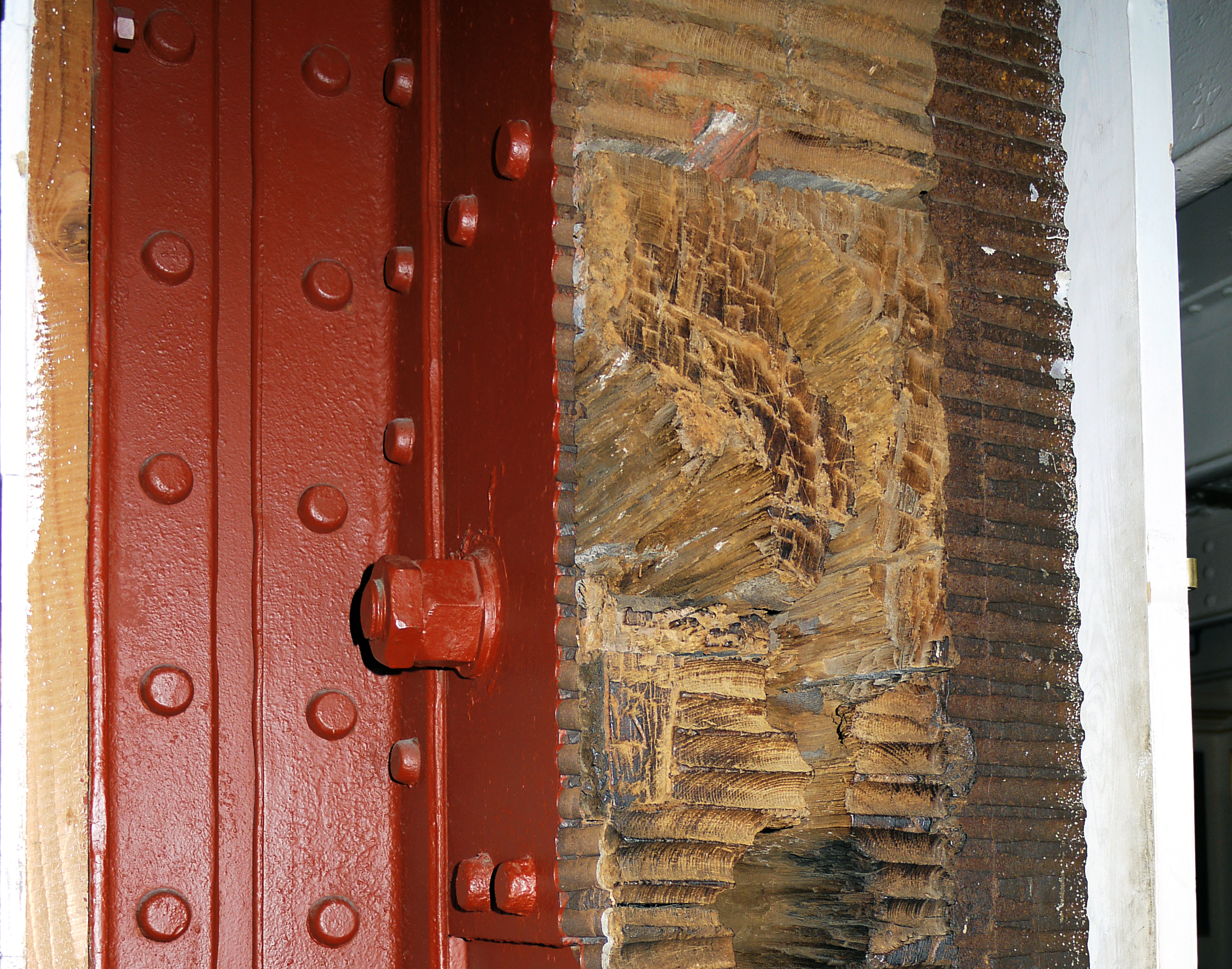
Cross section of Warrior's bulkhead armour. Iron on the right backed by teak.

Warrior's armour consisted of 4.5 in (114 mm) of wrought iron backed by 18 in (457 mm) of teak. The iron armour was made up of 3 by 12 ft (0.91 by 3.66 m) plates that interlocked by the tongue and groove method. It was bolted through the teak to the iron hull. The teak consisted of two 9 in-thick (229 mm) layers laid at right angles to each other; they strengthened the armour by damping the shock waves caused by the impact of shells that would otherwise break the bolts connecting the armour to the hull. Unlike most later ship armour, Warrior's armour was made by a process of hammering rather than rolling. Based on tests at Shoeburyness in October 1861 when the Warrior was launched, it "was practically invulnerable to the ordnance at the time in use".

The armour covered the middle 213 ft (64.9 m) of the ship and extended 16 ft (4.9 m) above the waterline and 6 ft (1.8 m) below it. The guns on the main deck were protected from raking fire by 4.5-inch transverse bulkheads. The ends of the ship were unprotected, but were subdivided into watertight compartments to minimise flooding. The lack of armour at the stern rendered the steering gear and rudder vulnerable.

=== Crew ===
The ship's crew comprised 50 officers and 656 ratings in 1863. The majority of the crew had to do physically demanding tasks; one such duty was the raising of the heaviest manually hauled anchors in maritime history. The day-to-day life of her crew differed little from those on the navy's traditional wooden-hulled vessels.

The majority of the crew lived on the single gun deck of the Warrior; these crewmen slept in hammocks slung from the sides and deck beams, with up to 18 men between each pair of guns. The officers berthed in the rear of the ship in small individual cabins; the wardroom was also the officers' mess. The captain had two spacious, well-furnished cabins.

Of the ratings, 122 were Royal Marines. As an experiment during the ship's first commission, all of Warrior's marines were from Royal Marine Artillery; subsequently some marine infantrymen were assigned as was the usual naval practice. The marines manned the aft section of guns and slung their hammocks between the crew's accommodation and the officers' cabins.

=== Propulsion ===
A reproduction of the pistons of HMS Warrior's engines

Warrior had a two-cylinder trunk steam engine, made by John Penn and Sons, driving a single propeller using steam provided by 10 rectangular boilers. The engine produced a total of 5,772 ihp (4,304 kW) during Warrior's sea trials on 1 April 1868 giving a speed of 14.08 kn (26.08 km/h; 16.20 mph) under steam alone. The ship carried 853 long tons (867 t) of coal, enough to steam 2,100 nmi (3,900 km; 2,400 mi) at 11 kn (20 km/h; 13 mph).

The ironclad was ship rigged and had a sail area of 48,400 sq ft (4,497 m^{2}). Warrior reached 13 kn (24 km/h; 15 mph) under sail alone, 2 kn (3.7 km/h; 2.3 mph) faster than her sister ship Black Prince. She had the largest hoisting propeller ever made; it weighed 26 long tons (26 t), and 600 men could raise it into the ship to reduce drag while under sail. To further reduce drag, both her funnels were telescopic and could be lowered. Under sail and steam together, the ship once reached 17.5 kn (32.4 km/h; 20.1 mph) against the tide while running from Portsmouth to Plymouth.

== Figurehead ==
Warrior's first figurehead was approved in August 1860, designed and carved by Hellyer & Sons of Rotherhithe. James and Frederick Hellyer would have worked on the carving, having split the firm in the mid-1800s to cover London dockyards and ensure increased contracts.

This original figurehead was lost in August 1868 when the ship collided with HMS Royal Oak. Once again the Hellyers were recommissioned to carve a replacement featuring the traditional warrior figure.

The new figure was placed inside the dockyard main gate at HMNB Portsmouth from 1900 to 1963 when the ship was modified to become part of the Naval Torpedo School. However, exposure to the elements meant rot set in, spreading so far that eventually the figurehead was condemned and destroyed.

Finally, a third figurehead – the one that can be seen on the bow of the ship today – was carved by Jack Whitehead and Norman Gaches at Wootton on the Isle of Wight, between 1981 and 1983 for the reconstruction of the ship that was taking place at Hartlepool.

== Construction and service ==
A cartoon published in Punch in March 1861, satirizing the Anglo-French naval arms race as an expensive card game between Emperor Napoleon III and Prime Minister Lord Palmerston. It implies that by playing the "Warrior card", Palmerston has won the game

Warrior was ordered on 11 May 1859 from Thames Ironworks and Shipbuilding Company in Blackwall, London. The ship was laid down some time after 6 June 1859 on the West Ham side of Bow Creek when the P&O ocean liner Seine was launched, and the slipway was reinforced to support Warrior's weight. Full-scale production of the ship's iron began in August, and the construction probably began in mid-August. Indecision by the Admiralty and frequent design changes caused many delays and nearly drove her builders bankrupt before a grant of £50,000 was awarded to keep them solvent. Her launching on 29 December 1860 was during the coldest winter for 50 years. She was frozen to her slipway and required the use of hydraulic rams, additional tugs, and dockworkers running from side to side on the upper deck to rock her free. Warrior was commissioned in August 1861 to conduct her sea trials; she was completed on 24 October for £377,292, (Note: There is an unusually large spread of figures for the ship's cost, some of which may include the cost of her armament and the £50,000 grant made to her builders. Lambert gives £357,291 and Winton, "about £390,000", which includes her guns and 850 long tons (860 t) of coal.) almost twice the cost of a contemporary wooden ship of the line. Between March and June 1862, defects exposed during her trials were rectified, and damage repaired. Changes included the fitting of a lighter bowsprit and a shorter jib boom, along with the provision of extra heads amidships.

The ship was initially assigned to the Channel Squadron under the command of Captain Arthur Cochrane. In March 1863, Warrior escorted the royal yacht that brought Princess Alexandra of Denmark to Britain to marry the Prince of Wales. The princess appreciated the conduct of the ship's crew, and requested Admiral Sir Michael Seymour to convey to the ship that "she was much pleased". Cochrane had the message engraved on a brass plate and fitted to the ship's wheel. Her descendant, Princess Alexandra of Kent, is now patron of the HMS Warrior 1860 Trust. In mid-1863 the Channel Fleet toured British ports for 12 weeks; the ship received 300,000 visitors, including as many as 13,000 a day in port. On 19 September, she rescued the survivors of the Mersey Flat Mary Agnes, which had sunk in a collision with the Isle of Man Steam Packet Company's ship Snaefell at Liverpool, Lancashire.

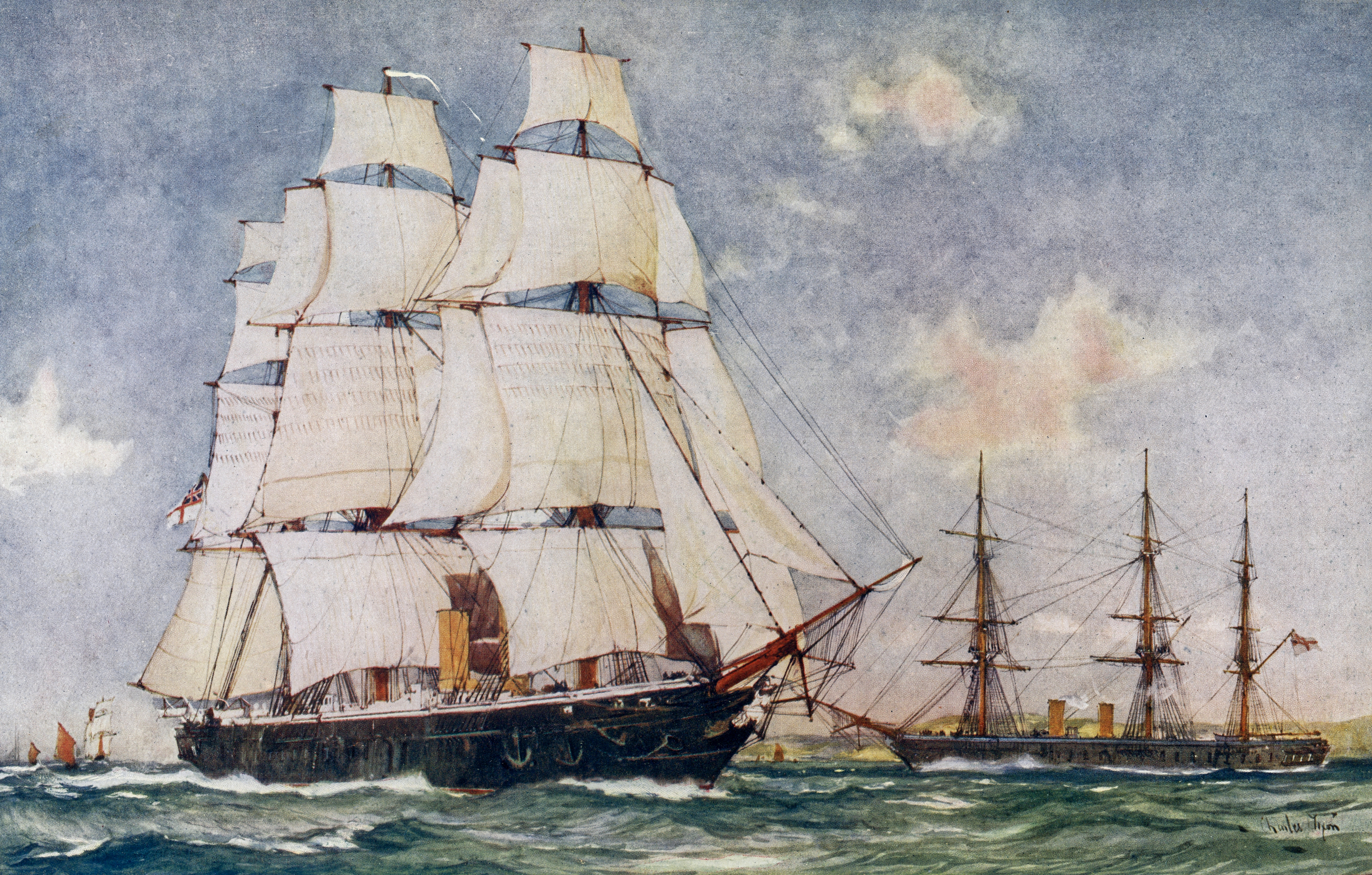
Warrior accompanied by Black Prince, by Charles Edward Dixon

Warrior began a refit in November 1864 during which the Armstrong guns, which had not proved successful in use, were removed and her armament was upgraded to the latest rifled muzzle-loading guns. She was recommissioned in 1867, under the command of Captain John Corbett, to relieve her sister as the guardship at Queenstown in Ireland, but instead both ships participated in the Fleet Review held on 17 July in honour of the visits made by the Khedive of Egypt and the Sultan of Turkey to Britain. After the review, the Admiralty paid off the ship on 24 July; the following day Warrior was recommissioned with Captain Henry Boys in command. After working up at Spithead, she sailed to join the Channel Squadron on 24 September. At the end of the year she was deployed to Osborne Bay to guard Queen Victoria at Osborne House. The Fenian Rising was under way, and there was intelligence suggesting that the Queen might be in danger from Irish nationalists. While Warrior was performing this duty, she received an informal visit from the Queen. The ship was part of a squadron that escorted the royal yacht HMY Victoria and Albert to Dublin in April 1868 for an official visit by the Prince of Wales, the future King Edward VII. In August, while cruising to Scotland, Warrior collided with HMS Royal Oak, losing her figurehead and jib boom and smashing Royal Oak's cutter. Captain Boys was court-martialled and acquitted over the incident.

From 4 to 28 July 1869, Warrior, with Black Prince and the wooden paddle frigate HMS Terrible, towed a specially built floating drydock, large enough to accommodate ironclads, 2,700 nmi (5,000 km; 3,100 mi) across the Atlantic from Madeira to Bermuda. Upon her return to England in late August 1869, Boys was relieved by Captain Frederick Stirling. After a refit to clean her hull and replace the figurehead lost in the collision, Warrior rejoined the Channel Squadron. On 2 March 1870, Captain Henry Glyn assumed command of the ship. While returning from a joint cruise with the Mediterranean Fleet, the ship was present when HMS Captain was lost during a severe storm on 7 September. Further cruises followed, including trips to Madeira and Gibraltar. Warrior narrowly missed colliding with HMS Agincourt when she was following her out of Gibraltar and Agincourt grounded on Pearl Rock.

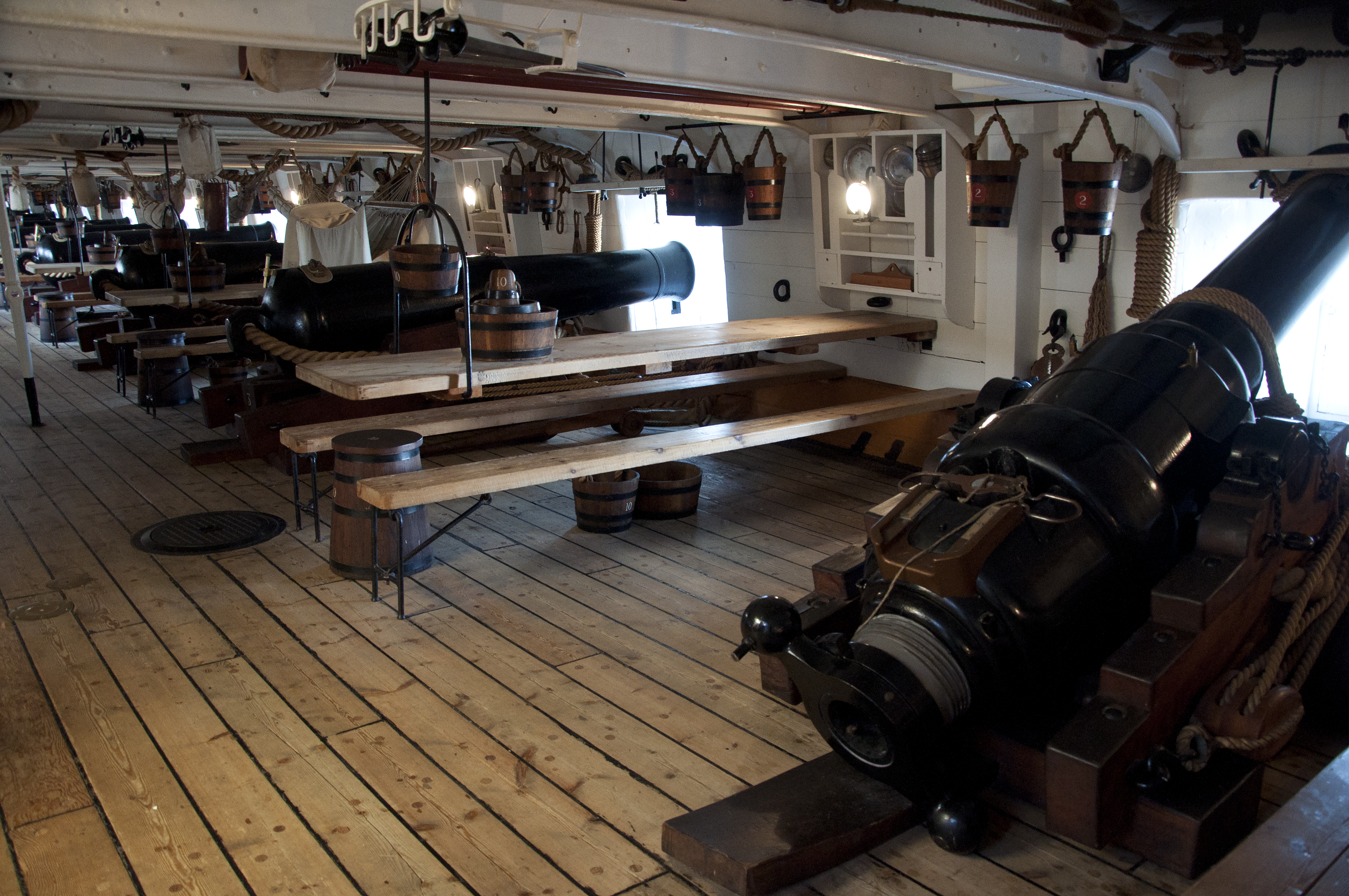
Warrior's gun deck after restoration

The rapid evolution of warship design, for which Warrior was partly responsible, meant that she started to become obsolete only ten years after she had been launched. In 1871 the Royal Navy commissioned its first mastless capital ship, HMS Devastation. In the absence of masts, the main armament could move from the broadside and traverse more freely from a higher position. In the same year, Warrior began a refit that lasted until 1875; it added a poop deck and steam capstan, a shorter bowsprit, and replacement boilers. In April 1875, the ship was recommissioned, and assigned to the First Reserve, where she served as a guardship at Portland. In this role, she went on annual summer cruises to various ports. During the Russo-Turkish War of 1877–1878, she was mobilised due to concerns that the victorious Russians might be about to attack Constantinople, forcing Great Britain to intervene, but nothing transpired and Warrior cruised to Bantry Bay instead. In April 1881 she was transferred to the Clyde District, where she served as guardship until 31 May 1883. Two of her masts were discovered to be rotten that month and with no replacements available, the ship was decommissioned and the masts removed.

Warrior was reclassified as a "screw battle ship, third class, armoured" in 1887 and again in May 1892 as a first-class armoured cruiser, although no changes were made to her. She was considered for modernization as late as 1894, but this was rejected as uneconomical after at least one new boiler was installed. She was struck off the effective list at Portsmouth and classified as hulk in March 1900. The ship was used as a storage hulk from May 1901 to July 1902. In preparation for her service as a depot ship for a flotilla of destroyers, the ship had her engines and boilers removed and part of her upper deck roofed over. Warrior served in this role from July 1902, under the command of Captain John de Robeck. In March 1904, she was assigned to the Portsmouth-based Vernon, the Royal Navy's torpedo-training school. Her name was changed to Vernon III that month in order to release her name for a new armoured cruiser HMS Warrior, and six new Belleville boilers and four electric generators were installed so that she could supply steam and electricity to the neighbouring hulks that made up Vernon. Most of the upper deck was roofed over to form classrooms for radio training, and her fore and mizzen masts were reinstalled. In October 1923, the school was transferred to a newly built shore installation, rendering Warrior and her companion hulks redundant; Warrior resumed her name on 1 October and the Royal Navy declared her redundant six months later.

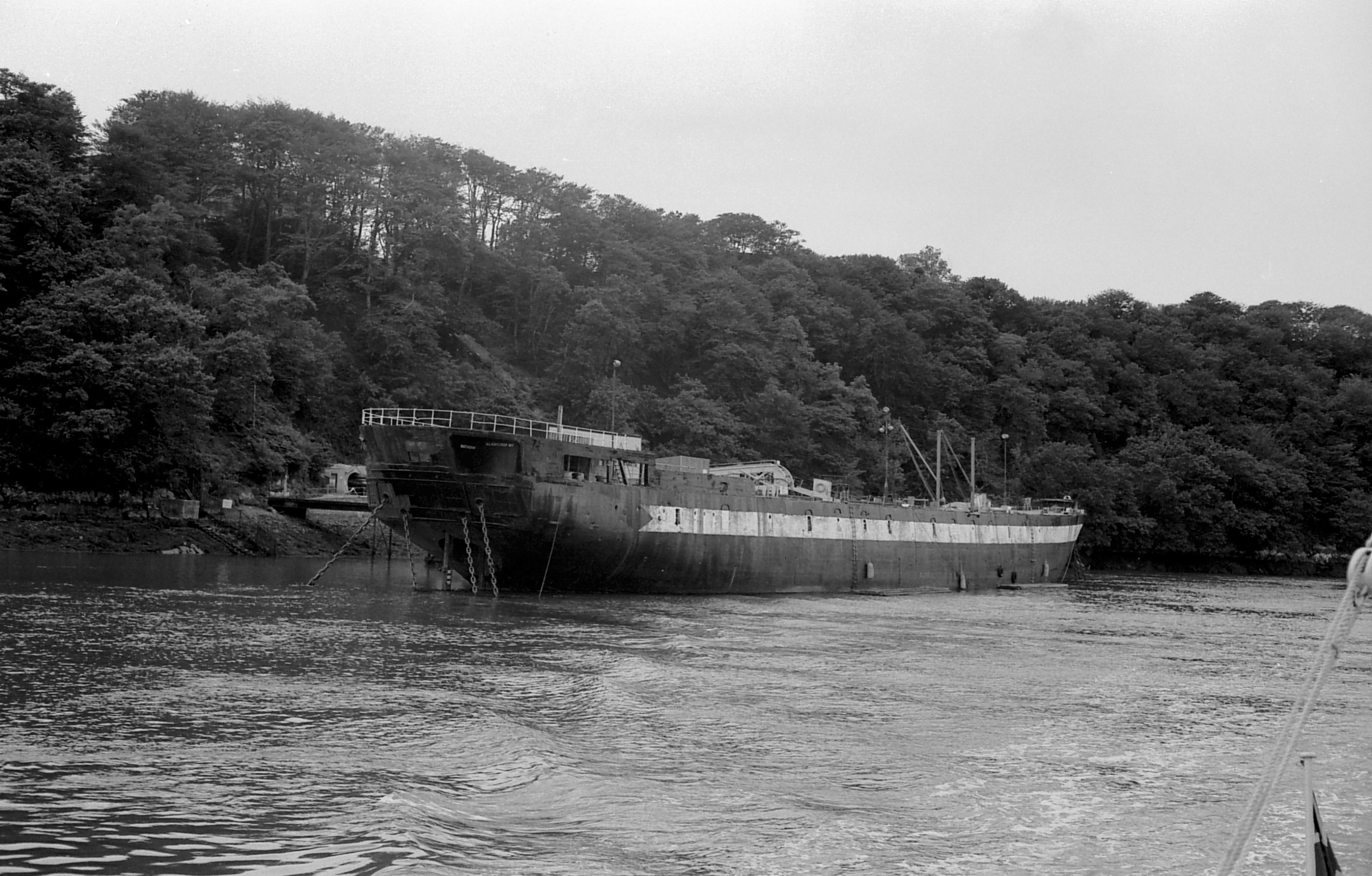
Warrior used as an oil jetty in Llanion Cove (1977)

The mass scrapping of obsolete ships after World War I had caused a downturn in demand for scrap iron by the time the Navy decided to sell off Warrior on 2 April 1925. There was no commercial interest in scrapping the old ship, and she remained at Portsmouth for another four years. She was modified into a mooring jetty beginning on 22 October 1927. This entailed the removal of all of her equipment and masts other than her boilers and generators, and the installation of two diesel-driven emergency pumps. The space under the poop was converted into accommodation for a shipkeeper and his family. The hulk was towed to her new home, Pembroke Dock in Wales, on 13 March 1929 where she served as a floating oil jetty. For the next fifty years, the ship lay just offshore from an oil depot at Llanion Cove. The Navy covered the ship's upper deck with a thick layer of concrete during one of her maintenance dockings before World War II. In the war, she served as a base ship for coastal minesweepers and, on 27 August 1942, was once again renamed as Oil Fuel Hulk C77 to release her name for use by a light aircraft carrier, HMS Warrior (R31), then under construction. She refuelled 5,000 ships during her service at Llanion Cove.

== Preservation ==
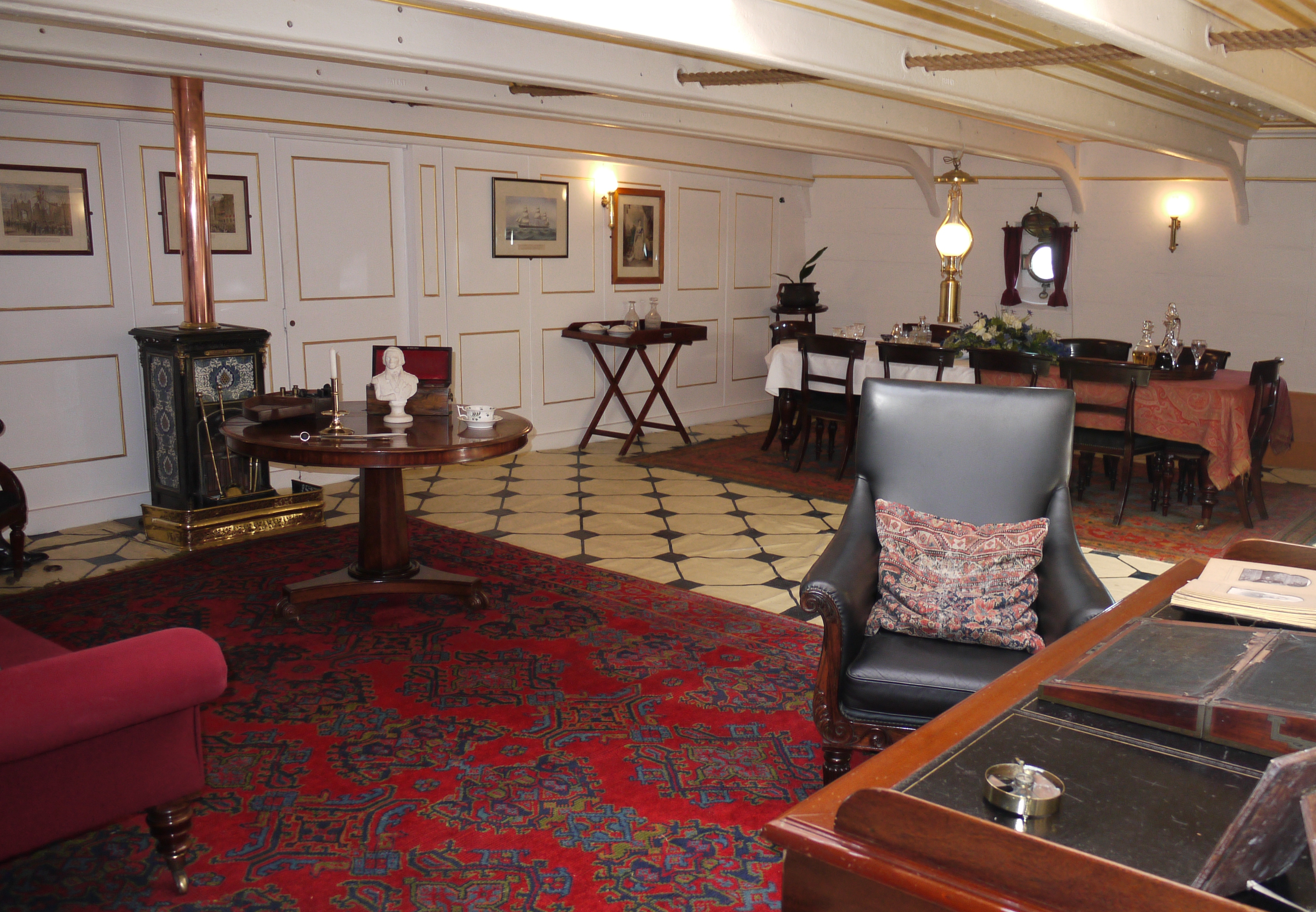
The reproduction captain's day cabin

Restoring Warrior was discussed in the early 1960s, but did not develop into a serious project. In 1967, the Greater London Council proposed to restore the ship as an attraction in London, but Warrior was still required in Pembroke by the Royal Navy and the scheme went no further. In 1968 the Duke of Edinburgh chaired a meeting that discussed preserving and restoring Warrior and other historic vessels, and a year later The Maritime Trust was established to save the decrepit ironclad and other historic ships. The Maritime Trust and a major supporter, the Manifold Trust led by the Conservative Member of Parliament (MP) John Smith, maintained an interest in Warrior. In 1976 the Royal Navy announced that the Llanion Oil Depot would close in 1978, and the Manifold Trust began to seek funds to restore her. With the promise of financial support for restoration, the Royal Navy donated the ship to the trust in 1979. The Ship's Preservation Trust acquired ownership of the ship in 1983; it became the Warrior Preservation Trust in 1985.

=== Restoration ===
In August 1979 Warrior began her 800 mi (1,300 km) journey to her temporary home in the Coal Dock at Hartlepool for restoration as a museum ship. She arrived on 2 September 1979 and began the £9 million restoration project, largely funded by the Manifold Trust. The Maritime Trust decided to restore Warrior to her 1862 condition with the aim that no further major work would be necessary for the next 20 years. The first two years of the restoration were generally devoted to safely removing material added after her first commission, like the poop deck and the 200 long tons (200 t) of concrete decking. Intensive research was done to find detailed descriptions of the ship and her equipment as of 1862 to make the restoration as accurate as economically feasible. Sources included surviving official records, and the papers of those who had served on the ship during her active service. Bolt-holes and ridges in the paint gave clues to the location of some fittings and fixtures, and the sketch plans of Midshipman Henry Murray, found in Captain Cochrane's Letter Book, showed the locations of the armament, moveable fittings and stores. (Note: At this time, midshipmen and sub-lieutenants were required to keep a logbook and illustrate it with sketches of the ship's equipment.)

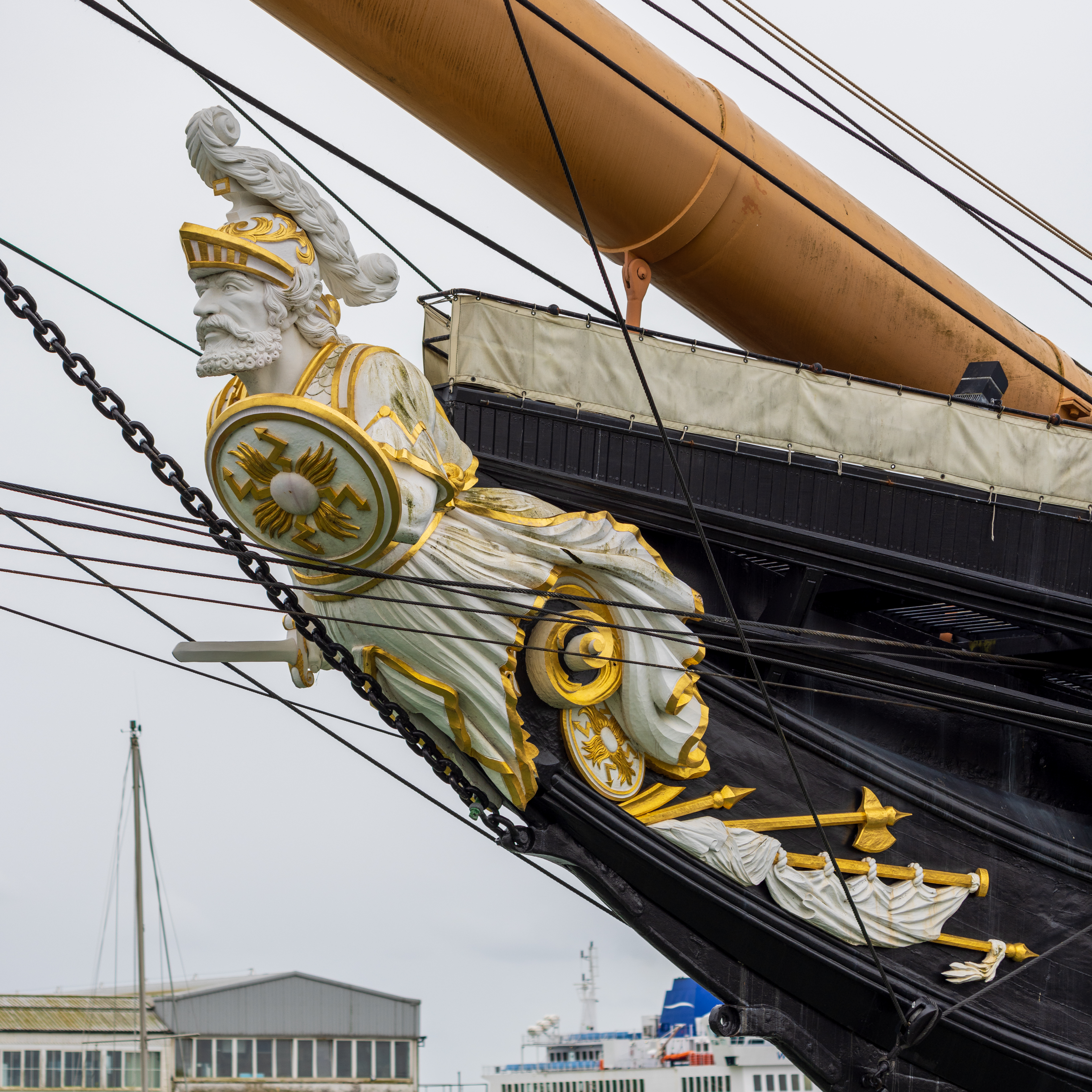
Warrior's figurehead in 2023

Work on carving a replacement for Warrior's figurehead, which was destroyed in the 1960s, began in 1981 using photographs of the original as a guide. The 12 ft (3.7 m) work-in-progress was displayed at the 1982 London International Boat Show with the carvers, Jack Whitehead and Norman Gaches from the Isle of Wight, still at work; it dominated coverage of the show. Before it was finished in mid-1983, the figurehead appeared on the BBC children's television programme Blue Peter. For much of 1984 it was displayed at the Main Gate of the Portsmouth Royal Dockyard. It was mounted on the ship on 6 February 1985.

Replacement of the ship's 86-foot-3-inch-tall (26.3 m), 42-inch-wide (1.1 m) lower masts in wood was not feasible, so they were made of steel tube cut and welded to shape, with a ladder inside each mast to allow access to the platforms on the masts. The three masts and the bowsprit were stepped in place between September 1984 and February 1985. Warrior's engines, boilers and auxiliary machinery were considered too expensive to rebuild, so replicas were built from sheet steel with a few components made from cast iron to duplicate the look of the real equipment. The replica engines can rotate slowly, using electrical power, to allow visitors to imagine how they might have looked in operation.

The Woolwich Rotunda Artillery Museum and the States of Jersey lent examples of Warrior's original primary guns, the muzzle-loading 68-pounder and the breech-loading 110-pounder, which were used as moulds for fibreglass replicas. The Armstrong guns were built with working breeches; they, and the muzzles of all the guns, had to be sealed to prevent people leaving rubbish in them. Little information was available on the wooden gun carriages despite extensive research, and a prototype had to be developed and tested before they could be built.

=== Museum ship ===
In 1985 a new berth beside Portsmouth Harbour railway station was dredged, and a new jetty constructed in preparation for Warrior's arrival in Portsmouth. The ship left Hartlepool on 12 June 1987, and was towed 390 mi (630 km) to the Solent in four days. When she entered Portsmouth Harbour she was welcomed by thousands of people lining the town walls and shore, and by over 90 boats and ships. After her safe arrival and berthing on 16 June, Captain King oversaw the securing of the vessel before handing her over to Captain Collin Allen. She opened as a museum on 27 July. The restored ironclad was renamed HMS Warrior (1860) to avoid confusion with the Northwood Headquarters, commissioned as HMS Warrior in 1963, which was at the time the operational headquarters of the Royal Navy.

Warrior is part of the National Historic Fleet, and is berthed in the Portsmouth Historic Dockyard complex, which is also the home of Nelson's flagship HMS Victory, the Tudor warship Mary Rose, and First World War-era monitor HMS M33. In 1995 she received over 280,000 visitors, and the whole dockyard receives between 400,000 and 500,000 visitors annually. Warrior continued to be managed by the Warrior Preservation Trust until 2017. In April of that year, the trust was taken over by the National Museum of the Royal Navy and Warrior became part of the museum's fleet. The ship continues to be used as a venue for weddings and functions to generate funds for her maintenance. The trust also maintained a collection of material related to the ship and an archive, although it is not yet open to the public.

== Bibliography ==
- Ballard, G. A. (1980). The Black Battlefleet. Naval Institute Press. ISBN 0-87021-924-3.
- Baxter, James Phinney III (1968) [1933]. The Introduction of the Ironclad Warship. Archon Books.
- Brown, David K. (2003) [1997]. Warrior to Dreadnought: Warship Development 1860–1905. London: Caxton Editions. ISBN 1-84067-529-2.
- Brown, David K. (2006). The Way of a Ship in the Midst of the Sea: The Life and Work of William Froude. Periscope Publishing Ltd. ISBN 1-904381-40-5.
- Brown, Paul (2009). Britain's Historic Ships: The Ships That Shaped a Nation: A Complete Guide. Anova Books. ISBN 978-1-84486-093-7.
- Brown, Paul (2016). Maritime Portsmouth. The History Press. ISBN 978-0-7509-6871-3.
- Fuller, Howard (2014). Empire, Technology and Seapower: Royal Navy Crisis in the Age of Palmerston. Taylor & Francis. ISBN 9781134200450.
- Lambert, Andrew D. (1984). Battleships in Transition: The Creation of the Steam Battlefleet 1815-1860. Conway Maritime Press. ISBN 0-85177-315-X.
- Lambert, Andrew (1987). Warrior: Restoring the World's First Ironclad. Conway Maritime Press. ISBN 0-85177-411-3.
- Lambert, Andrew (2010). HMS Warrior 1860: Victoria's Ironclad Deterrent (2nd revised and expanded ed.). Naval Institute Press. ISBN 978-1-59114-382-6.
- Padfield, Peter (2000). Battleship. Birlinn. ISBN 1-84158-080-5.
- Parkes, Oscar (1990) [1966]. British Battleships, Warrior 1860 to Vanguard 1950: A History of Design, Construction, and Armament (New & rev. ed.). Naval Institute Press. ISBN 1-55750-075-4.
- Roberts, John (1979). "Great Britain (including Empire Forces)". In Chesneau, Roger & Kolesnik, Eugene M. (eds.). Conway's All the World's Fighting Ships 1860–1905. Mayflower Books. pp. 1–113. ISBN 0-8317-0302-4.
- Sandler, Stanley L. (2004). Battleships: An Illustrated History of Their Impact. ABC-CLIO. ISBN 1-85109-410-5.
- Wells, John (1987). The Immortal Warrior: Britain's First and Last Battleship. Kenneth Mason. ISBN 0-85937-333-9.
- Winton, John (1987). Warrior: The First and The Last. Maritime Books. ISBN 0-907771-34-3.
