= Jessica Benton =

British actress

Jessica Benton (born 15 November 1948) is a British actress, mainly known for her role as Elizabeth Onedin / Frazer / Fogarty in the BBC series The Onedin Line, that ran from 1971 to 1980.

Benton had some minor roles on TV such as Z-Cars in 1970, and The Juggler of Notre Dame (1970). She also appeared in Upstairs, Downstairs (1971) as Lady Cynthia Cartwright in the episode "The Path of Duty", The Duchess of Duke Street (1976) as Eleanor Prentice in the episode "A Lesson in Manners", and Thomas & Sarah (1979) playing Grace Laughton in the episode "Birds of a Feather".

In 1974, after receiving coaching in the language, Benton appeared in the Dutch-language film, De vijf van de vierdaagse.

With the conclusion of The Onedin Line Benton's career as a television actor largely ended, although she did appear in a drama-documentary shot in Austria in which she played Queen Anne. Benton also did a selection of plays at Salisbury Playhouse, inaugurated in 1976.

In 1977, Benton was living with her husband, Charlie Waite, a photographer and ex-actor, and their two-year-old daughter in South Kensington. In 1993 she was living in Dorset with her husband, daughter, 10 dogs and over 100 chickens.

Benton was active in the women's rights movement of the 1970s, and in campaigns for wildlife conservation.
