= Laura Hartong =

British actress

Laura Lynn Hartong (born 23 August 1958) is a British former television actress best known for playing Charlotte Onedin in four series of The Onedin Line created by Cyril Abraham.

Born in Windsor, in the 1970s Hartong attended the Elmhurst Ballet School in Camberley in Surrey, where a contemporary was the actress Hetty Baynes.

Laura Hartong made her first television appearance as Naomi in six episodes of The Growing Summer (1968), and played Princess Yasmin in the episode 'The Princess and the Potion' in Jackanory Playhouse (1972). However, she is best known for playing Charlotte Onedin, the daughter of Anne and James Onedin, in 33 episodes of the popular BBC drama The Onedin Line (1977-1980). In 1989 she married John Alley; the marriage was later dissolved. In 2001 she married marketing executive Guy Andrew Coite Tarring (born 1953). This marriage was also later dissolved.

After leaving acting Hartong went into marketing, and today she is Field Marketing Manager at Seagate Technology in Slough. She is a Trustee of the British Ballet Organization, the dance examination board.
