= Charlie Waite =

English photographer (born 1949)

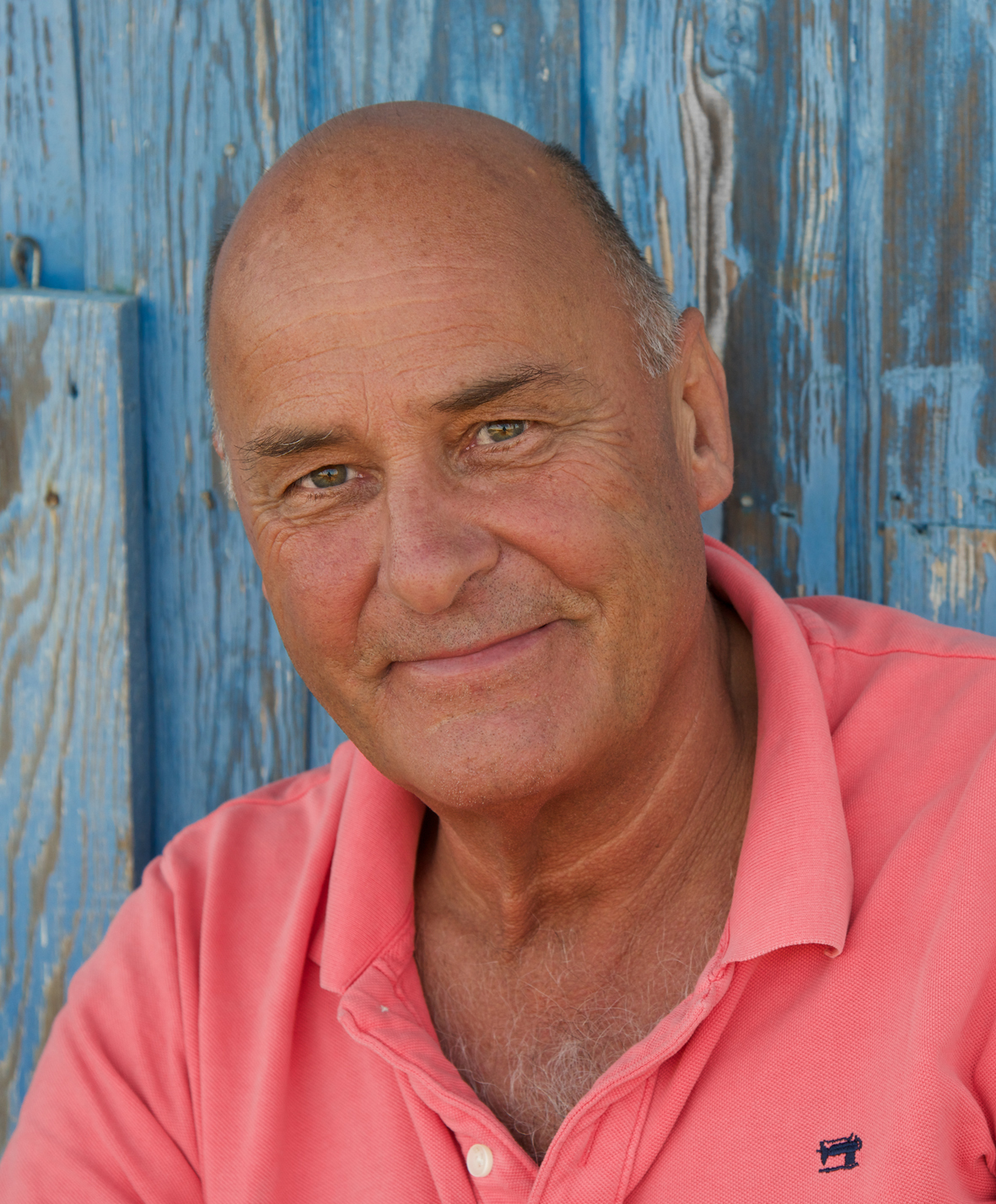
Charlie Waite in March 2020

Charlie Waite (born 18 February 1949) is an English landscape photographer noted for his "painterly" approach in using light and shade.

Born in England, he worked in theatre and television for the first ten years of his professional life before moving to photography. He is noted for his square format images using a 6x6 Hasselblad.

Waite is the recipient of a number of awards including an Honorary Fellowship to the British Institute of Professional Photography as well as Best Landscape Photography's 'Power of Visionary Award' and is frequently invited all over the world to give lectures on landscape photography. He was awarded a direct Fellowship (FRPS) of the Royal Photographic Society in 2014 and was invited to exhibit at the Royal Academy of Arts, London in summer 2015.

Waite has contributed and written columns for The Daily Telegraph, contributed to The Sunday Times, Independent, The Observer and The Guardian newspapers. He has also presented a number of photography television series for ITV along with appearances on BBC Breakfast and Countryfile. Waite was interviewed for BBC News Channel about his travels in Libya days before the revolution and about his exhibition, Silent Exchange, at The National Theatre.

He has held over 30 solo exhibitions across Europe, the US, Japan and Australia including venues at the Goldstrom Gallery on Broadway, New York in 2001, Hope at the OXO Gallery in London in 2002 and Earthscapes at The Center For Photographic Art in Carmel, California in 1999.

Waite has lectured in the UK, Europe and the United States, published over twenty-eight books on photography, is a regular contributor to photography magazines and was guest editor and contributor for The Photographic Journal August edition in 2015.

He runs a photographic tour company called Light and Land.

Waite founded the UK Landscape Photographer of the Year competition in 2006.

Waite is married to Jessica Benton; they have one child.
