= Kathleen and May =

British ship

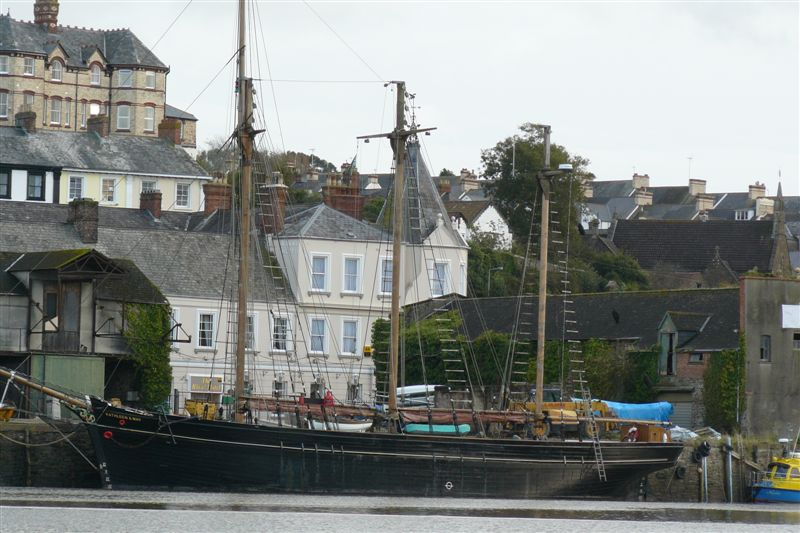
- Kathleen & May moored on the River Torridge in Bideford, Devon

History

United Kingdom
- Name: Kathleen & May
- Ordered: 1900
- Builder: Ferguson and Baird
- Laid down: 1900
- In service: April 1900
- Out of service: 1961
- Reinstated: 1999
- Home port: Connah's Quay (1900-1908); Youghal (1908-1931); Appledore (1931-1961); Bideford (1999-2012); Liverpool (2012-present)
- Identification: Code letters MDNN; MMSI number: 235036333
- Status: Museum ship

General characteristics
- Class & type: Schooner
- Tonnage: 136 GRT
- Length: LOA 126 ft (38.40 m); LWL 98.4 ft (29.99 m)
- Beam: 23.2 ft (7.07 m)
- Depth: 10.1 ft (3.1 m)
- Speed: 17.15 knots (31.76 km/h)

Kathleen and May is the last remaining British-built wooden hull three masted schooner. Registered in Liverpool, Merseyside, but presently based in Gloucester, she is listed as part of the National Historic Fleet.

== History ==
She was built in 1900 by Ferguson and Baird at their Connah's Quay, Flintshire yard, for local shipping company Coppack Bros. Constructed with a doubled frame of oak, these were covered by 3 inches (76 mm) thick seasoned pitch pine planks, fastened to the frames with treenails and iron bolts. Equipped with the first known fitting of Appledore roller reefing, the sails are reefed by a ratchet lever that engaged the cogs on the Gaff boom, thereby winding the sail around it, and then locked to prevent the sail unwinding from the boom. Launched in April 1900 under Captain John Coppack, she was named Lizzie May after the Captain's daughters.

Placed to work on the Irish Sea, by 1908 she had sailed nearly 40,000 miles (64,000 km), when she was sold into the coal-shipping fleet of Martin J Fleming of Youghal, Ireland, and renamed the Kathleen and May after his daughters. Fleming modified her, adding before World War I both a longer lower yard to lengthen the middle sail, and a martingale fitted to the bowsprit. She now plied her trade between Youghal and the ports of the Bristol Channel, as a coal lugger.

In 1931 she was sold to Captain Jewell of Appledore, North Devon. On arrival in her new home port, she was fitted with an 80 brake horsepower (60 kW) Beardmore diesel engine, and with her topsails removed her topmasts were reduced in height. After surviving the storms of February 1936, in 1937 she experienced engine trouble in sight of Youghal's lighthouse, but managed to make port. In 1943, her engine was upgraded to a 125 brake horsepower (93 kW) Deutz diesel.

After the death of Captain Jewell in 1945, she passed to his son Tommy. In 1947 he had the martingale removed, but continued to ply her on the Irish Sea coal trade, which was now in severe decline.

== Restoration ==
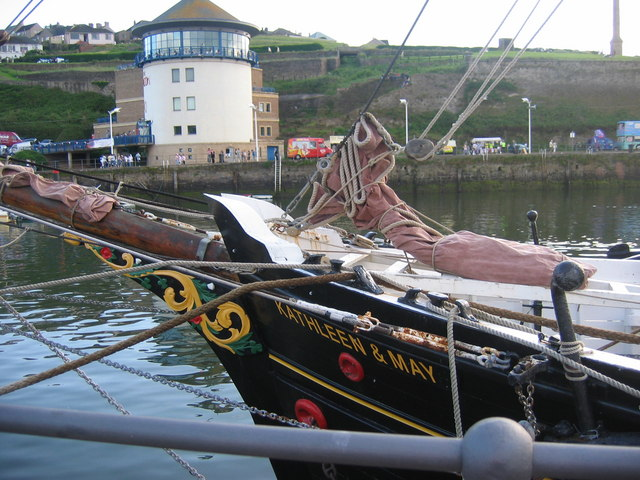
Restored bow sprit of Kathleen & May, beside the quay in Whitehaven

She was acquired by a film company in the early 1960s, used in a small number of films and then laid up in Southampton Water, where she was spotted in 1966 by master mariner Capt WP (Paul) Davis, a James Fisher skipper. He sold most of his collection of vintage and veteran motor cars to raise the money to buy her. With a crew of one (a retired agricultural engineer, McKenzie (Ken) Morgan), Paul sailed her around the coast to Appledore, where she was berthed on the mud in the estuary outside the port (to avoid port dues). Paul resigned his post with James Fisher and spent the next five years working on the restoration of the schooner with the help of friends, financed by the sale of more of his collection of vintage cars and on occasion by work conducting sea trials on new vessels for Appledore shipbuilders. Paul's ambition was to restore her to working condition and then to ply the Bristol channel as a merchantman again, but the job proved too big a challenge and in 1970 he sold her to the Maritime museum.

Prince Philip, Duke of Edinburgh set up The Maritime Trust in a bid to preserve a number of examples of Britain's decaying maritime heritage. The Trust moved her to Gloucester Docks, and began restoring her as a typical West Country schooner, but failed to secure a £2 million National Lottery Heritage Fund grant.

Businessman Steve Clarke from Bideford, Devon then bought her. Towed by sea to Bideford, in February 1999 she was hauled out of the water by two 1,000 tonnes (1,100 tons) heavy lift mobile cranes, and placed on to the disused Brunswick Wharf at East-the-Water. 70% of the original planking was stripped from the frames, enabling most of her internal timbers to later be refitted. While the stern of the ship was stripped down to the keels, the reconstruction of the bow required the replacement of 6.5 tonnes (6.4 long tons; 7.2 short tons) of sacrificial oak timber. Once the frames were refitted, the surviving parts of the original frames were steam cleaned at 3000psi, to kill fungal spores.

The ship was fitted with a 400 brake horsepower (300 kW) Detroit diesel ex-lifeboat engine, and the single propeller was replaced by a pair of hydraulically driven propellers. The ship now carries enough fuel to do 2,000 miles (3,200 km) under engine power alone. Redecked with new seasoned timbers, she was given a second refit, with all masts and rigging restored to the originally constructed and researched 1900 specification. On completion, she underwent a rigorous MCA CAT2 inspection.

As a result of his efforts in restoring Kathleen and May, Councillor Steve Clarke was awarded the OBE in 2008.

== Present ==
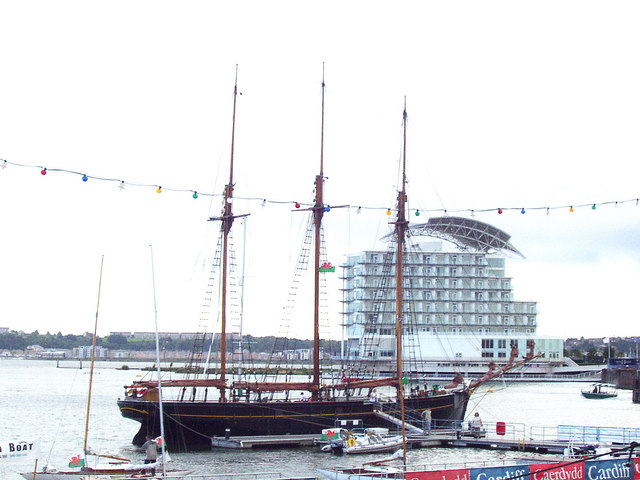
A restored Kathleen & May returns to Cardiff Bay in 2003, with the St David's Hotel & Spa in the background

Based in Bideford on the River Torridge, since her restoration Kathleen & May now regularly sails across the Bristol Channel and the Irish Sea. She has returned to Youghal, attended various festivals, and sailed across the Bay of Biscay to Bilbao as the paid guest of the Guggenheim museum.

Since 2010 Kathleen & May is berthed in Albert Dock beside Merseyside Maritime Museum.

In June 2021, Kathleen & May returned to Gloucester Docks for a repair to her bowsprit together with a repair to her hull at the world renowned T.Nielsen & Co in Gloucester Docks. She attended the Gloucester Tall Ships Festival in 2022, thereafter work began upon the repair. As of January 2023, she is currently in the Dry Dock and soon to be moved to the waters in Gloucester Docks as she undergoes further maintenance by a small, but willing team of volunteers.
