= Lydia Eva =

Steam fishing ship, in use as museum

Coordinates: 52.605481°N 1.724650°E

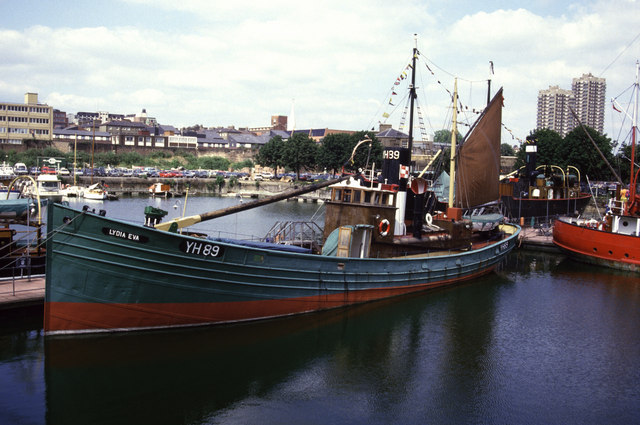
- Lydia Eva

History

United Kingdom
- Name: Lydia Eva
- Owner: Harry Eastick of Gorleston-on-Sea.; Mr. Geoffrey Banes of Caenarvonshire Yacht Company.; Maritime Trust.; Lydia Eva Charitable Trust Ltd.
- Operator: Lydia Eva and Mincarlo Charitable Trust Ltd.
- Port of registry: Great Yarmouth
- Builder: Kings Lynn Slipway Co. Ltd.
- Laid down: 1930
- In service: Regular experience / passenger days
- Identification: Port Number YH89
- Status: Museum ship

General characteristics
- Class & type: Sidewinder trawler
- Tonnage: 138 grt 64 net
- Length: 95 ft (29 m)
- Beam: 20.6 ft (6.3 m)
- Depth: 9.8 ft (3.0 m)
- Installed power: Engine: 1930, Crabtree & Co. (R.H. Hutchinson), Triple Expansion, 10" + 17" + 28" x 20".; Boiler: 1961, Stockton Chemical Engineers & Riley Boilers Ltd., RT Scotch.

Lydia Eva is the last surviving steam drifter of the herring fishing fleet based in Great Yarmouth, Norfolk. The Great Yarmouth herring fleet had made the town the major herring port in the world in the early part of the 20th century. She is listed as part of the National Historic Fleet. She famously appeared in the film Wonka.
