= Cyril Abraham =

English screenwriter (1915–1979)

Cyril Abraham

Cyril Stanley Abraham (22 September 1915 – 30 July 1979), was an English screenwriter best known for creating the popular BBC series The Onedin Line (1971–1980), writing the scripts for 22 episodes in addition to five novels based on the series.

== Early years ==
Born in Liverpool in England, the son of John Abrahams, an oil mill labourer, and Agnes (née Davies), a widow, who married in 1918, as a boy Abraham attended the Liverpool Collegiate School and as a youth on the training ship HMS Conway before going to sea as an apprentice with the Liverpool shipping line Lamport and Holt. He had a period as a Bevin Boy down Bold Colliery before serving as a Marconi wireless operator in the Merchant Navy during World War II. After the war, having literary aspirations but not knowing how to pursue them, he became a bus driver with Liverpool City Transport; here he worked with Harold Hargreaves Harrison, the father of George Harrison.

His first marriage in 1945 to Evelyn M Howarth was later dissolved. While still driving buses in Liverpool he met local school teacher Joan Thomas; she encouraged him to start writing by renting a typewriter for him when he could not afford to do so for himself. She hired him the cheapest available, a pink model as these were not suitable for offices because of their bright colour. The couple married in Liverpool in 1964. Initially his short stories and articles were published in Australian magazines before he made the break into writing for television.

== Television writing ==
Abraham's writing for television included Coronation Street (1960), The Verdict is Yours (1962), Suspense (1963), The Villains (1964), No Hiding Place (1960–1964), Catch Hand (1964), Londoners (1965), King of the River (1966), Z-Cars (1967), The Expert (1968), The First Lady (1969), Dixon of Dock Green (1969), Counterstrike (1969), Paul Temple (1969–1970), Owen, M.D. (1971–1972), and The Onedin Line (1971–1980).

== The Onedin Line ==
Abraham had originally envisaged The Onedin Line as being about a modern shipping company with its boardroom battles and seagoing adventures, but then he discovered that almost all such companies were run by boards of anonymous executives. However, he noticed that most of these companies had their origins in the 19th century, mostly started by one shrewd and far-sighted individual who, through his own business acumen, built up a shipping line from nothing. Abraham stated that James Onedin was not based on one individual but was rather an amalgamation of several characters. Suggested real-life inspirations include Victorian era shipping line owner James Baines & Co. of Liverpool (a leading character in the series was named 'Captain Baines'), Sir Samuel Cunard and the Allan Line.

The Onedin Line first appeared as a one-off BBC Drama Playhouse production transmitted on 7 December 1970; and though thought lost, a copy of this episode was found in the American Library of Congress in September 2010. Like the series which was to follow, it was set in Abraham's native Liverpool. Initially Abraham struggled to come up with a title for the drama. An article in Woman magazine published in July 1973 featured an interview with Abraham in which he recalled how he came up with the very unusual family name Onedin. He wanted something unique, he said, and had already decided to call the leading male character James but still had not found a surname. Then came some inspiration – he said:

One day I stumbled across the word Ondine, a mythological sea creature. By transposing the "e", I had James Onedin, a sea devil.

The drama so impressed the powers that be at the BBC that a 15-part series was commissioned, with the first episode of Series 1 being transmitted on 15 October 1971; Abraham wrote six episodes in this first series. In total he went on to write 22 of the 91 episodes, which were shown over 8 series. He continued to be involved in the series until his death in 1979.

=== Novels ===
Abraham wrote five of the six novels based on the series, namely The Shipmaster (1972), The Iron Ships (1974), The High Seas (1975), The Trade Winds (1977) and The White Ships (1979).

The books are not straightforward novelisations of the television episodes, since the author introduced additional material and also changed a number of details, though dialogue from the series that Abraham had penned himself is used. A series of Onedin short stories by Abraham, set between Series Two and Series Three, appeared in Woman magazine in 1973.

Abraham had intended to write a whole series of novels about the Onedin Line, but he died in 1979 after completing the fifth book, The White Ships. The saga was eventually to have seen James and Elizabeth Onedin as two elderly autocrats, both determined not to relinquish their hold on the shipping business. Elizabeth Onedin would have still been a formidable woman in her 90s, while James Onedin would have died aged 102, leaving the family divided over control of the company. Abraham had intended the Onedin story to continue right up to the 1970s, following the progress of the descendants of Charlotte Onedin and William Frazer, played by Laura Hartong and Marc Harrison in the TV series.

Abraham, a heavy drinker, died of liver failure in 1979 aged 64 in Manley in Cheshire where he and Joan lived. After Joan's death in 2014 Cyril Abraham's archive of scripts, letters and other documents became available for sale on eBay and other sites.
