= List of Onedin Line episodes =

This episode list shows details of the 91 episodes of the BBC television series The Onedin Line.

== Series 1 ==
No.	Title	Directed by	Written by	Original release date
1	"The Wind Blows Free"	William Slater	Cyril Abraham	15 October 1971
James Onedin is an ambitious, headstrong sea captain working for the Callon Line. Upon returning to Liverpool in 1860, he is denied a bonus by his employer, Thomas Callon, because a portion of the cargo has been lost. Upon seeing a notice offering the old schooner Charlotte Rhodes for sale for £500, James decides to set up his own shipping company. Unfortunately, his cautious brother Robert, who has inherited their father's chandler's shop while he was away, refuses to put up any capital. James calls on Captain Webster to inquire about the Charlotte Rhodes. Webster rejects James' low offer of £175 (his life savings), but his compelling spinster daughter, Anne, who deftly manages her cantankerous and drunken father, is concerned about her future. She makes James a counteroffer: the ship as dowry. Anne Webster, "on the wrong side of thirty", is significantly older than 28 years old James, at a time when single women had barely any rights. He offers her an interest in the company, but she insists on the protection that only marriage can bring. He is surprised, but, after some thought, accepts. He persuades Robert to enter into a partnership (and an equal share of the profits of the first voyage) by giving him all his money, £150. When Anne objects, James explains in private that he is not doing his brother any favour. The money will not last long, and while he is at sea, Robert will have to fend off the creditors and families of his crew. James and Anne get married and the wedding dinner is served on the deck of the Charlotte Rhodes. Anne insists on staying onboard for their honeymoon, James agrees. Anne begins sewing a house flag for the ship, bearing the Onedin company emblem. James sails with Anne to Portugal to see a wine merchant and longtime Callon client, Senhor Braganza. Thomas Callon guesses what he is up to and reaches Braganza first, offering to lower his shipping rate to secure a new contract. However, James makes a daring proposal, to deliver Braganza's wine for free provided he is given a monopoly on returning the wine barrels, which are worth more than the wine itself. Braganza agrees.
2	"Plain Sailing"	Paul Ciappessoni	Cyril Abraham	22 October 1971
On the return journey from Portugal, James and Anne appear to be getting on extremely well despite the unorthodox origin of their union. He begins to teach her how to navigate, using a sextant and a watch. A seaman dies and James becomes gravely sick with a fever, due to bad food. Anne has to take over his duties, including navigation. The ship's mate, Mr Baines, is illiterate and cannot help. The crew do not want to take orders or even advice from a woman, but Anne is strong-willed and perseveres despite their growing hostility. She tries to recall and follow James' instructions, but fails to keep the ship on course. Eventually, Baines refuses to heed her instructions any longer. The strain takes its toll on Anne. Finally, just when things seem to have reached the breaking point, Anne makes a bargain with Baines: she will teach him to read and write in return for his cooperation. They agree to share the responsibilities, and successfully get the ship back on track as James recovers. Back in Liverpool, Robert is at his wits' end waiting for the overdue ship. All James's funds (and his own) have been spent, with no end to creditors and sailors' dependants clamouring for payment. Meanwhile, Elizabeth, though she has a longtime suitor in shipmate Daniel Fogarty, is courted by Albert Frazer, the scion of a shipbuilding family.
3	"Other Points of the Compass"	Moira Armstrong	Alun Richards	29 October 1971
When Robert finds out there was no profit on the first voyage, he wants out of the partnership, but is dissuaded by his wife Sarah. James' sister Elizabeth is engaged to shipmate Daniel Fogarty, but is frustrated by his insistence on getting married only after Callon makes him a captain. She is also strongly attracted to Albert Frazer. James prefers Frazer as well, as his family would be very useful for the newly established Onedin Line. Thomas Callon floods James with barrels, which he is by contract obliged to take in, but he has no place to store them nor money to rent one. Frazer offers temporary storage for free. Elizabeth breaks her engagement with Daniel Fogarty. A confrontation leads to reconciliation, and sex.
4	"The High Price"	Viktors Ritelis	Cyril Abraham	5 November 1971
With more barrels than he has room for, James seeks a warehouse to store them, and finds one owned by the widowed Mrs. Arkwright. However, she wants £650 for it, more than James can raise. James persuades his reluctant brother to get information from Mrs. Arkwright's unpaid companion, Miss Simmons, who misinterprets Robert's interest in her. Guilt-ridden, Robert extracts a promise from his brother to find her suitable employment if Mrs. Arkwright does leave. Thomas Callon learns of James's plan and offers £700 for the building, but James plants doubts in Mrs. Arkwright's mind as to Callon's sincerity. She agrees to James's offer: a house in her French hometown La Rochelle and free passage there. A rag and bone dealer, Ada Gamble, is using the warehouse, but she is pressured into leaving when James discovers she has sold stolen candlesticks to Anne. Robert is aghast when he finds Miss Simmons working for Ada; James shrugs off his outrage. Robert's wife Sarah gives birth to a son. Anne and James have to move into the warehouse after Captain Webster mortgages his house for £150, where they are living, and Callon forecloses. Elizabeth now fears that she has become pregnant, but cannot find the opportunity to inform Daniel Fogarty before he leaves on a sailing trip.
5	"Catch as Can"	Peter Graham Scott	Alun Richards	12 November 1971
James Onedin is in a battle with his former employer and main competitor, Thomas Callon, to keep what few clients he has. Callon pressures Mr. Watson, who recently consigned a small shipment to Onedin, telling him they will refuse to carry his trade to India unless they get 100% of his business. Callon's son Edmund begins to set his eye on what few assets James has managed to acquire. When Baines fails to return from a visit to his sister, James knows it has to be Callon's handiwork. He finds and rescues the shanghaied Baines from an American clipper bound to Boston. With Daniel Fogarty away, Elizabeth is at her wits' end and Anne thinks she knows what the problem is. Albert Frazer inherits a house and invites not only James and Anne but also Elizabeth, who is his prime reason for extending the invitation. Daniel Fogarty is made a captain, master of the Caledonia. Anne and Elizabeth tell Robert of the pregnancy.
6	"Salvage"	Viktors Ritelis	Michael J. Bird	19 November 1971
With James and Robert now aware of Elizabeth's condition, they insist that she reconcile with Daniel Fogarty and marry him without delay. Upon Fogarty's return from a sea voyage, they inform him of the situation. However, he insists on consulting Elizabeth. Elizabeth stubbornly refuses to be pressured into marriage. James faces ruin when the Charlotte Rhodes, under Baines' command, is abandoned by her crew six miles from shore due a fire in the forward hold. Edmund Callon suggests to his father taking their fastest ship to claim her and her cargo for salvage. James faces ruin – he did not insure the vessel for this trip – and asks Albert Frazer if his untested steam-powered ship could get there first. Despite a temporary breakdown, they do reach the Charlotte Rhodes first, put out the smouldering fire and bring the ship into port.
7	"Passage to Pernambuco"	Darrol Blake	Cyril Abraham	26 November 1971
James and Anne are finally going move into a real 5 room house of their own (for £25 per year). When James sees Braganza in Lisbon, he learns that his best client may soon be out of business. The Phylloxera insect is ravaging the grapes of Europe, and the vineyard next to Braganza's is already infested. He hopes to graft the roots of resistant North American grapes, but has been unable to charter a ship to get them. The only available suitable one is the clipper Pampero. James proposes a bold plan: that the two buy the ship and its cargo. In exchange for Braganza putting up the money, he will get his grape roots for free and half the profits on the ship's voyages for the next five years, unless James can buy him out before the five years are over. If he cannot, Braganza will get full ownership of the Pampero. The ship's crew is Portuguese, but surprisingly Mr. Baines speaks the language, which he has learned from his previous girlfriend. On the voyage, unfavourable winds and troublesome passengers (Dom Vasco Baptista and his master Dom Pedro de la Cruz's enslaved peasants) make James decide not to go to Pernambuco to deliver his cargo of cork and salt, but straight to Baltimore, United States. Avoiding a monopoly of salt traders, he makes a deal with a railroad builder: the salt portion of 850 tonnes of his cargo at a vastly reduced price of 5 cents a tonne in exchange for the 1,000 railroad workers collecting 100,000 of the wild grape roots that grow like weeds in the region. Elizabeth and Albert Frazer elope and get married. Robert is delighted of the union, turning a blind eye to that Elisabeth is pregnant with Daniel Fogarty's child.
8	"Homecoming"	Peter Cregeen	Barry Thomas	3 December 1971
James has made enough profit from the trip to Baltimore to pay off the mortgages on the Charlotte Rhodes and the warehouse. He returns to find Anne chatting with Michael Adams, her close friend since childhood who went to sea four years previously. James becomes jealous, and not without reason. It turns out the pair had planned to marry after Adams returned, but he did not, nor did he write. Despite having been separated for three months, James decides to sail off again straight away. Anne asks to join him. She finds Adams aboard as part of the crew. During the voyage, she learns he had not come back because he thought he was wanted for the murder of a tyrannical shipmate. The real (accidental) murderer also happens to be on the ship. When he refuses to sign a confession, Michael punches him, sending him tumbling overboard to drown. Anne had previously protested how the murderer had been let off the hook by the captain of the other ship, but now she is happy to see James show her old boyfriend the same leniency.
9	"When My Ship Comes Home"	Ken Hannam	David Weir	10 December 1971
James charters the clipper Maisie Anges from Thomas Callon to pick up a cargo in Gibraltar (for which he mortgaged the cargo of the Charlotte Rhodes). On the return journey, the captain picks up all sorts of goods, including gunpowder, which blows up and sinks the ship. This time, James has insured ship and cargo, but Mr. Chubb of the insurance company claims it's invalid because there should have been a separate insurance for the gunpowder. Assuming that the Onedins are broke, Thomas Callon pressures Robert to sell his shop (which stands in the way of his plans for a new dock); but when Robert mentions that the Onedin Line is a limited company, Callon's son Edmund explains that in a limited company the liability of its directors (being James and Robert) is limited to the amount of its share capital. If Callon sues, he bankrupts the company, but not James and Robert. Also, the possessions of the company will be divided among the creditors, and he assumes that James will have made sure the biggest debtor will always be his other company, Onedin Warehousing. So Robert doesn't sell the shop and Thomas Callon decides not to sue, assuming James will not accept bankruptcy, but keep on fighting, even though he no longer had the means to do so. And indeed he does, but he acquires the means by 'stealing' the Charlotte Rhodes and sails off with several hundred pounds he collected from friends and family (plus £100 from a money lender, causing him to sigh "I never signed my life away before"). With this money he buys a load of weaponry to sell to rebels (not against England, Anne makes sure), giving him a profit of £2000, with which he can easily pay off Callon. He assumes that having effectively stolen the Charlotte Rhodes will not cause him any problems now that he is a 'man of substance' (i.e., he's got money).
10	"A Very Important Passenger"	Peter Cregeen	Roy Russell	17 December 1971
James gets an offer to take aboard a passenger in complete secrecy for the high sum of £100. This makes him suspicious and through further inquiry he learns that Thomas Callon had turned down an offer of 300 guineas, after which he easily manages to raise the price to £400 (£200 up front and £200 on arrival). This is music to the ears of Robert, who has sold his shop to Callon after all, and now needs several hundred pounds to buy a new shop (plus stock). Mr. Baines is taken sick and pretty soon a replacement ship's mate presents himself, who says he can quickly gather a crew he knows well. At sea, the passenger hands over orders to take him to Sardinia instead of Livorno, the destination of the ship. The passenger claims the orders are from George Pelham of the foreign office, but they are unsigned. When an 'accident' happens that could have killed the passenger, he reveals his identity – he is Giuseppe Garibaldi, on a mission to oust the occupying forces of Austria and France from Italy. A discussion arises between James, who wants to reach Livorno in time to collect his bonus (the only profit he can make on the type of cargo he is carrying) and Garibaldi, who is not sure of the welcome he will receive there and wants to land in Caprera, just off Sardinia. The crew, who turn out to all be in on the assassination attempt, try to take over the ship, but fail, in part thanks to the revolver that Garibaldi carries – after each shot they think he is unarmed because he would have to reload. After this, James decides to drop Garibaldi off in Caprera. Back in Liverpool, Robert had learned from Albert Frazer that Melly's shop is up for sale. The asking price was £450, but he managed to knock that down to £375. With the £400 from the voyage, he can now buy this shop. But James proposes a third company for their partnership – Onedin Chandlers Limited. Of which, as with the other two companies (Onedin Line and Onedin Warehousing), James will hold 85% of the shares – after all, who raised the money by transporting Garibaldi?
11	"Mutiny"	David Cunliffe	Ian Kennedy Martin	24 December 1971
There has been a mutiny on a ship chartered by James and he boards off the French coast to see if he can still rescue the cargo of pineapples, which would perish if the crew were to be tried in France. He proposes to sail the ship home under his command and convinces the crew that it is better for them to get a trial in England, so they will be able to see their wives and children again. They claim they didn't mutiny but relieved the captain of his duties because he had gone mad, throwing food overboard, making false accusations and beating someone for not singing a hymn properly. During the voyage, James finds out the captain is a religious fanatic who is convinced he will die on the voyage. He says the crew plan to kill him and is found hanged shortly after. In Liverpool, they discover the ship has made a lot of water, as a result of holes drilled in the hull. An auger is found in the quarters of the captain, who was the only one below during the storm, during which it must have been done. James testifies and the crew are acquitted.
12	"Cry of the Blackbird"	Gerald Blake	Bruce Stewart	31 December 1971
James has sailed to Australia with passengers, hoping to get a cargo of wool that will make him over £1000, enough to pay off the Pampero. But once there, he finds the farmers have all left their farms for a gold rush and there is no wool. A parson offers to pay him to take 'lost souls' from Papua to a missionary school in Victoria. On the voyage there, they discover the parson is a drunk and his associates are 'salvaged' criminals and troublemakers. After the Papuans have been picked up it turns out that it is a case of blackbirding (slavery) for the sugar cane plantations. When the Papuans find out, they set fire to the parson and James decides to return them to their home.
13	"Shadow of Doubt"	Ben Rea	Cyril Abraham	7 January 1972
This episode plays almost entirely in England. Thomas Callon offers Daniel Fogarty a 'shore job', taking over several of his own duties, as marine superintendent. On the first birthday of Elizabeth and Albert's son William, Robert accidentally reveals that Daniel is the father. James takes emigrants to Quebec, for £5 a head (food included, since they are by law no longer allowed to take their own). Robert puts some poor relatives on the ship for free, pointing out a clause in the articles of association (which James himself put in there), that family of company owners are always granted free passage on Onedin Line ships. These relatives, however, have small pox, for which there is no cure. Anne insists they return, but James points out that if they go back they will be put in quarantine for up to three weeks, during which they will not receive any aid (even food or water) from shore, causing even more misery, whereas if they go on and the couple survive, their scars will have time to heal before they reach Canada. Of course he would have to falsify the ship's logs. To which Anne also objects, causing James to sigh that if she doesn't stop playing the part of his conscience, it will one day bring them to the poor house.
14	"Blockade"	Ben Rea	Allan Prior	14 January 1972
James gets an offer to supply the southern states during the American Civil War. For this, he has to run a Yankee blockade, but the profits would be proportional. He decides to put all the company's money (£2500) into boots, blankets and firearms. On the return trip, he can make another huge profit on cotton, which is in very short supply in England and dirt cheap in the southern states, also due to the blockade. Anne strongly objects to this support to slavery, but comes along anyway, as does Albert Frazer, leaving Elizabeth behind. They pick up a pilot in Bermuda, who, for £750, will take them to Wilmington, around the blockade, dangerously close to the shore. They succeed, but once there, the pilot says he wants to wait for several weeks before returning because the yanks now know they're there. James is not so patient and decides to try it without the pilot's help, paying the pilot only half the money, for half the trip. But he gets caught and taken to New Orleans. However, on the way there, the Yankee captain turns out to be an engineer and a man of progress, who is impressed by Albert's design of a steamship, the Golden Nugget. So James tells him that the £30,000 he planned to make from the voyage would have gone into building the Golden Nugget. The combination of this money not getting lost to progress, the job offer by Albert and half the profits of the journey (£15,000) are enough to convince him to defect and come to England, thus averting bankruptcy for the Onedin Line.
15	"Winner Take All"	Gerald Blake	Cyril Abraham	21 January 1972
The Onedin Line now owns £27,484/10/4 in assets. But that's not cash in hand and James needs £1500 to pay off the Pampero. Robert and Sarah are, however, overjoyed with the £200 dividend they get from their 15% stake (for which they originally invested £15). James has no intentions of letting Albert Frazer build the Golden Nugget – that was clearly just a story to get out of a difficult situation. Albert is in financial trouble now, but Elizabeth sweet-talks his father to take him back into his business and consequently arranges a dinner party designed to get them and James to talk business. Albert explains the economics of a steam ship. Sailing ships have reached their limit in size, but steam ships can be made much larger. A big one would cost £40,000, the price of four clippers, and £1000 in coal for a round trip to Quebec, but it would carry the same cargo as two clippers (2500 tonnes) and do the round trip in 28 days instead of 52. James orders a 4000-tonne ship, for which he floats a public company with £100,000 worth of shares (£60,000 for building the ship and £40,000 for operating costs). Albert Frazer gets 15%, but James is to own the ship. £50,000 will be on call, so with an investment of £20,000 he will control the company because shareholders always disagree (or so he is told). But Thomas Callon buys a majority through different nominees (so James won't know what's happening) and manages to sway the other shareholders into electing him as director. Callon now 'owns' Onedin. On top of that, Baines, a captain now and on his first command, sinks the Pampero while rounding the notoriously dangerous Cape Horn. James is in a fit, but Anne reminds him he still has the Charlotte Rhodes.

== Series 2 ==
No.	Title	Directed by	Written by	Original release date
16	"The Hard Case"	Peter Graham Scott	Cyril Abraham	17 September 1972
Thomas Callon and his son Edmund are killed in a fire and the company passes to his niece, Emma. Daniel Fogarty, attracted to her, wastes no time in offering his services as her business advisor. James charters the Star of Bethlehem for a voyage to the West Indies with a man named Jessop amongst the crew. He is a union man and quick to assert the sailor's rights to decent treatment. When a man falls overboard and dies, Jessop blames James, as does Anne.
17	"Pound and Pint"	Ben Rea	Cyril Abraham	24 September 1972
In Liverpool, Jessop sets about organizing a strike, though many seamen feel they cannot afford it. When the strike finally occurs, Anne, shocked by her husband's callous attitude, helps the strikers' families. James is prepared to negotiate with Jessop, brokering a separate deal giving the advantage to the Onedins and not the Callon line. However, Daniel Fogarty calls in strike breakers, leading to a full-scale riot during which Robert's shop is burned down. Anne, unable to cope with James' opposition to her charitable actions, leaves him.
18	"A Woman Alone"	Roger Jenkins	Elaine Morgan	1 October 1972
Anne lodges with a grateful Mrs. Jessop but initially has trouble finding work until she becomes a bookkeeper in a shop. Elizabeth blackmails Daniel Fogarty by holding over his head the fact that he fathered her child and if Emma Callon finds out, she will end their partnership. James discovers a stowaway, Peter Thompson, whom he puts to work on the Charlotte Rhodes but the boy is unused to sailing and has a bad fall. James is annoyed to discover that Peter's father is a wealthy potato merchant but after Onedin's treatment of his son, not only does he refuse to deal with James but has him beaten up.
19	"Fetch and Carry"	Ben Rea	Alun Richards	8 October 1972
In Ireland, an enigmatic woman, Miss Indigo Jones, asks James to get her damaged ship, the Samantha, with its cargo of guano, home to Liverpool. James is suspicious that there is something wrong but, motivated by greed as usual, consents. The ship is filthy but James has it cleaned and, having bribed a relation of Albert Frazer, he gets it through customs. However the truth is that Miss Indigo has killed several crewmembers, because they had yellow fever, which enters Liverpool. Captain Baines attempts to reconcile the Onedins but each is too stubborn to give way.
20	"Yellow Jack"	Peter Graham Scott and David Sullivan Proudfoot	Alun Richards	15 October 1972
Albert Frazer is convinced James caused the outbreak of yellow fever by docking Indigo Jones' ship. Albert's father is to head the tribunal enquiring into the source of the epidemic and appoints Daniel Fogarty as an independent assessor of the deaths of Liverpool seaman. Fogarty takes great delight in telling Elizabeth he will use the evidence to finish Onedin. However, Albert persuades his father that James kept quiet to protect the good name of the Frazers, with whom he was associated, and James is exonerated. The outbreak starts to abate and there is a reconciliation between James and Anne when she is suspected of having the illness and he rushes to her bedside.
21	"Survivor"	Roger Jenkins	Peter Graham Scott	22 October 1972
Returning from a voyage to China, James picks up an old man floating in a lifeboat. He is John Hennessy, sole survivor of a shipwreck, but when odd things start to happen the crew want to throw him overboard as a Jonah. Baines saves him, but he admits that he killed the other occupant of the lifeboat in an act of self-preservation. Albert Frazer falls for music hall singer Carrie Harris, who ends up pregnant by him. She can be bought off but it casts a shadow on his marriage.
22	"Coffin Ship"	Gerald Blake	Bruce Stewart	29 October 1972
Without revealing her identity, Elizabeth goes to see Carrie Harris, who is not pregnant but told Albert Frazer she was to get money from him. She knew Albert was married and this makes Elizabeth determined to leave him. Captain Baines is given command of the Pibroch, an old ship with a mysterious cargo. In fact, it is a coffin ship, one that the owners deliberately want sunk because it is too old for service but sinking means they can claim the insurance. The ship is indeed sunk. Baines saves the crew with help from James.
23	"Frisco Bound"	David Cunliffe	Allan Prior	12 November 1972
Following the enquiry into the Pibroch's scuttling, Baines is temporarily reduced to mate. The head of the board, Sir Walter Teal, asks Baines and Onedin to take his young son David as an apprentice. The boy is keen for a mariner's life and his father hopes the harsh realities will make him change his mind. James and Baines are very hard on him, which Albert Frazer notices, but James tells him he would be better occupied patching things up with Elizabeth. David ultimately proves himself as a very capable sailor and even puts in a good word for Baines with his father.
24	"Beyond the Upper Sea"	Cyril Coke	Moris Farhi	19 November 1972
The Onedins and Albert Frazer travel to Turkey, where James is annoyed to find that Albert is about to agree to a ten-year contract making steam engines for a local pasha. Albert is even considering living with Leyla, a concubine, unaware that back home a row between his wife and Daniel Fogarty has ended in a kiss. When the pasha is murdered by enemies, however, Albert is implicated and the Liverpool party must flee as a nearby volcano erupts.
25	"An Inch of Candle"	Gerald Blake	Martin Worth	26 November 1972
Anne is pregnant and Elizabeth urges James to buy a house and move out of the warehouse for the baby's sake. James comes across the immaculate, extremely fast, but deserted ship the Maria da Gloria, and travels to Ireland, where it is to be the subject of a low-key auction, as it is a former slave ship. Daniel, Fogarty arrives and competes with James to buy the ship. It goes to James but he has paid more than he intended and thus cannot afford a house. However, on return to Liverpool, he finds that Anne has miscarried.
26	"Goodbye, Goodbye"	David Cunliffe	David Weir	3 December 1972
Anne is again pregnant and at last James buys a house for them. Sailing on the Lady Lazenby, Baines suffers an accident and it seems that he will have to have his leg amputated. Onedin opposes this, believing that the leg can be saved if it is set. Albert Frazer and Elizabeth prepare for divorce, but ultimately decide to give the marriage another chance. Daniel Fogarty admits to Emma Callon that he fathered Elizabeth's child, but they still plan to marry.
27	"Bloody Week"	Gerald Blake	David Weir	10 December 1972
In 1871 James goes to Paris to collect an old debt, despite the fact that the city is in the hands of the Citizen Communards, and they are involved in a civil war with the rest of France.
28	"The Challenge"	Gerald Blake	Cyril Abraham	17 December 1972
James travels to Zanzibar, where he meets Said Ben Salim, a sheikh who asks him to take some Islamic pilgrims to Mecca. However, it soon transpires that these are not pilgrims but slaves and James puts them ashore in Africa, enabling them to return home. On his return to Liverpool, he issues an unusual challenge to Daniel Fogarty; to race each other to Fuzhou in China and back with a cargo of tea, the winner assuming the overall control of the Onedin Line.
29	"Race for Power"	Peter Graham Scott	Cyril Abraham	31 December 1972
In Liverpool, the Frazers combine to try to smuggle Jessop, who has been imprisoned and is now on the run, to Ireland. He is apprehended but they stand by him at court. The race between James and Daniel Fogarty has begun, both captains having their wives on board. James reaches Fuzhou first but learns that Daniel aims to cut corners by using a second ship. However, Daniel gets caught in the monsoons whilst Baines negotiates James' ship through them. Anne goes into labour as the Onedins approach Liverpool and James risks losing the race by breaking protocol and rushing her to the port without taking on board the pilot. However, he is declared the winner but his joy is short-lived for Anne dies giving birth to their daughter. The episode ends with a more sombre rendition of the theme tune.

== Series 3 ==
No.	Title	Directed by	Written by	Original release date
30	"The Ship Devils"	Peter Graham Scott	Cyril Abraham	21 October 1973
Widowed James busies himself with work. On his new steamship, the Anne Onedin, the passengers number coal merchant Biddulph, who arranges a shipping contract with James, and his daughter Leonora. The Callons have difficulty managing their line and sell Jack Frazer, father of Albert who is now working in Argentina, the bulk of the company whilst Daniel Fogarty returns to sea. His first ship sinks due to shoddy workmanship – the rivets used to hold the boat together are inferior – or sea devils. Initially Onedin is blamed but Captain Baines discovers that the fault lay with the original builders and James is exonerated. Samuel Plimsoll, however, the 'sailor's friend', come to Liverpool to support Robert in his bid to become a Liberal councillor, is unimpressed by James' obsession with profit.
31	"The Stranger"	David Sullivan Proudfoot	Cyril Abraham	28 October 1973
Onedin's contract with Biddulph is jeopardised when the coal miners go on strike. Onedin eventually breaks the strike by getting some of the miners drunk, then signing them up as sailors and having them arrested if they refuse shipboard duties. Samuel Plimsoll is horrified. James Onedin also picks up a lone woman in a boat off the South American coast. Initially amnesiac she proves to be Jack Frazer's niece, Caroline Maudslay, sole survivor of an attack by natives on her husband's engineering expedition.
32	"Echoes from Afar"	Martyn Friend	Alun Richards	4 November 1973
Both shipping companies are anxious to open up trade in Brazil and James learns from Caroline Maudslay that her uncle Jack Frazer has sold the Anne Onedin, renamed Scotch Lass, to a navigation company with a view to Daniel Fogarty taking it up the Amazon. Senor Braganza is anxious for his son, Jose, to become his business representative in England but the young man is only interested in tropical biology. Captain Baines goes to Portugal and drugs the lad with a view to bringing him to England but ultimately James takes him to South America, where he can study the flora and fauna.
33	"Amazon Cargo"	David Sullivan Proudfoot	Alun Richards	11 November 1973
Accompanied by Portuguese-speaking Caroline Maudslay and the Braganzas, James Onedin, Frazer, Captain Baines and Daniel Fogarty take four ships up the Amazon with a view to establishing a coal trade with the Brazilian railways. Fogarty's men are spooked when they are attacked by natives. Ultimately, Caroline knows from her understanding of the language that the locals have no intention of doing anything but fleecing the visitors and they all withdraw. However, Jose Braganza is killed by natives, causing his father to terminate his dealings with Onedin.
34	"Danger Level"	Martyn Friend	Martin Worth	18 November 1973
Samuel Plimsoll MP enters Liverpool and raises concerns about the ships' safety. He advocates the use of his Plimsoll line to mark the safe cargo loading level for the ships in port. James is reluctant to use it, but eventually accepts the use of the Plimsoll Line after he realises it won't make his ships uneconomic and Mr. Plimsoll realises he was being too harsh on James (and ultimately his rivals) after all.
35	"Black Gold"	David Sullivan Proudfoot	Moris Farhi	25 November 1973
In 1876 Caroline Maudslay's acquaintance Henry Wickham asks James Onedin to smuggle valuable rubber tree seeds out of Brazil so that he can start a plantation in India. James and Caroline set sail but they fall foul of local big-wig Ortega and, for their own safety, have to return home without the seeds. Eventually they discover that they were being used as decoys by Wickham who, with Daniel Fogarty, set out on a separate expedition and obtained the seeds.
36	"Law of the Fist"	Gerald Blake	Barry Thomas	2 December 1973
Previously the confirmed bachelor, Captain Baines falls for his landlady Mrs. Darling, and, as a favour to her, agrees to take her brother, Tom Ballantyne, on his next voyage. Tom does not approve of Baines as a suitor for his sister and animosity rises between the two men. Finally, Baines strikes Ballantyne and gets into trouble as a result. In the meantime, Mrs. Darling has accepted a proposal from another suitor.
37	"Ice and Fire"	David Sullivan Proudfoot	Allan Prior	9 December 1973
James Onedin plans to sail to Sweden with iron rails and bring home a cargo of timber for use in the Biddulph mines. Leonora Biddulph, piqued at the attention James is giving Caroline Maudslay, agrees to part-finance the trip and accompanies him. In Sweden, Count Ericson plays hard to get, haggling for a high price for his timber but James knows he must give in else the ice floes will form and block the return voyage. Leonora persuades the count to drop his price. When the ship is in danger of ice James uses dynamite from the ship's cargo to blast its way out. On return to Liverpool Caroline awaits James and they end up kissing.
38	"A Proposal of Marriage"	Gerald Blake	Alun Richards	16 December 1973
Baines is at sea with Anne's father. They become involved with a Venezuelan army colonel who has brought smuggled bullion aboard and tries to bribe Baines. Back at Liverpool, James is about to propose to Caroline Maudslay, but is distracted by his own brother Robert with a salvage job, attempting to salvage Daniel Fogarty's ship, the Scotch Lass, whose condenser is broken, while it lies on top of the newly laid Wallasey telegraph cable. James indemnifies Fogarty against damage to the cable, but demands a £5000 rescue fee. James tows the Lass into port: It is his by salvage rights. A good deal it seems, but it costs him Caroline's hand – his prioritising a business adventure over their marriage apparently leaving her unsure if the marriage is what she wants.
39	"Over the Horizon"	Roger Jenkins	Martin Worth	6 January 1974
James and Baines venture to Africa to bring home son of the newly-ennobled Blanchard family, who has brought aboard a range of souvenirs of Africa, including a young African woman. Baines is sent to return her to her village and determine if a river is navigable. Elizabeth, longing for the excitement of London, travels down with Mr. Blanchard – but finds his wiles the equal of hers. Miss Biddulph brings news of the sleeping fever from a magazine she has read in the Chamber of Commerce. This has befallen Baines, who is nursed by his African companion and who finds the Crocodile River is impassable due to a waterfall. Back in Liverpool, Miss Biddulph is upset to learn that James had asked for Caroline Maudslay's hand.
40	"The Silver Caddy"	Gerald Blake	John Lucarotti	13 January 1974
James voyages to Fuchou, China for a cargo of tea and in hope of gaining the Pringlehoffer. Miss Biddulph distinguishes herself in coping with injury on board, and gains in James' estimation. James hopes to take the Teawynd home round Cape Horn. Daniel, however, who has arrived just before him wins the contract – by the innovation of the transcontinental railroad: Just as steam is displacing James' sailboats, America is growing onto the world business scene. Robert is elected to parliament, to represent his Liverpool constituency.
41	"Port Out, Starboard Home"	Roger Jenkins	David Weir	20 January 1974
Robert has moved to London and feels himself rising in society. Carried away, he plans to commit Onedin to a Mexican railroad. James travels with Caroline Maudslay, leaving Leonora Biddulph distressed, and, for the first time, angry and impatient. Baines is stranded in the Arctic after Fogarty, bull-headed, wrecks the ship they are travelling in on ice. James is happy in London, and enjoying Caroline's easy company. Robert's wife Sarah invites Leonora to visit, causing tension, and setting the scene for her to find new love with Hugh. Daniel Fogarty is rescued, but James sets out rescue Baines as soon as he learns he is lost. Finding Captain Baines, his "right hand", he learns that the railroad scheme is a con.
42	"The Passenger"	Peter Graham Scott	Cyril Abraham	27 January 1974
The girls take Leonora Biddulph in hand. Wishing to make her more attractive to James, they make her more attractive to men: dress, hair, a bone corset ... and an introduction to James' younger cousin Richard. Fogarty notes that Albert Frazer's patent for a hydraulic steering linkage, unique and working reliably on the Anne Onedin, is potentially very valuable, and about to expire. He plots to profit from this, in return for payment from Frazer, and run away to Australia with Elizabeth Frazer. James is transporting bullion from Baltimore to Liverpool for an American – which turns out to be sea piracy. Daniel Fogarty's plan is undone when Robert finds out about the patent, and wishes to buy it for the company. When Frazer finds out, he is furious. Giving Fogarty £1000, he washes his hands of him. Elizabeth on hearing that Fogarty is using her (Albert's) money for "their" plans, also abandons him. He emigrates alone. Caroline Maudslay tells James that had he asked for her hand again in marriage she would have said yes, but that the marriage would have been one he'd regret. He needs a loving, devoted wife who will bear him sons. She leaves for London. James proposes to Leonora Biddulph, who tells him it is too late: the banns of marriage are to be read the coming Sunday: she is engaged to Richard. As James sits alone, contemplative, his daughter with Anne enters the room, clutching her dolls. Peter Gilmore plays both James and Richard Onedin.

== Series 4 ==
No.	Title	Directed by	Written by	Original release date
43	"The Loss of the Helen May"	Raymond Menmuir	Alun Richards	25 April 1976
Albert Frazer has died in Buenos Aires of fever and James is in a foul mood. Petroleum has begun to be shipped to the UK from America, though how to transport the fuel is in dispute: barrels, or in bulk. Robert smells profit from this new cargo. The Helen May, a Frazer steam vessel carrying petroleum sinks entering the River Mersey in dense fog: The barrels have leaked and explode when the crewman watching the cargo carries a kerosene lantern in the fumes against orders. James, under sail and also returning home, refuses to put a boat out for survivors, claiming it has gone down with all hands. Baines and James are at odds: James feels the need to capitalise on Fraser's misstep; Baines is energized by regrets at not searching for lost seamen. They argue: afterwards, James has a strange turn; he may be going blind. A seaman, still alive washes up on shore. At the accident inquest, the survivor testifies that the vessel was proceeding at top speed. The conclusion is of dereliction of duty on the part of the master of the Helen May. Elizabeth is living with Jack Frazer: They have sent Albert's plans and concepts for bulk carriage of petroleum to Philadelphia.
44	"A Cold Wind Blowing"	Raymond Menmuir	Martin Worth	2 May 1976
As the technology of ocean-going steam improves, James has trouble getting business and crew for his sail-based fleet; with just one steamer, he can't compete with the steamers' guaranteed delivery dates. A new face on the scene, Mr. Briggs and his Briggs Line is competing hard for business with a steam-only fleet, and demanding more ships from Frazer. Elizabeth is encouraging Jack Frazer to borrow money to expand his yard and produce more steam vessels, and he agrees, somewhat reluctantly. James obtains a £5000 cash cheque from Briggs for his one steamer, the Anne Onedin. He then buys old Captain Fowey's fleet of seven ships. James has received a telegram from Robert warning him the Welsh miners are going on strike. As the miner's strike spreads, James has doubled his fleet at a rock bottom price, and sold the steamer at the peak of its value. With coal unavailable, James soon fills all his new ships.
45	"Not Wanted on Voyage"	Gareth Davies	Martin Worth	9 May 1976
James and Elizabeth set off for Buenos Aires to search for plans of a refrigeration plant invented by Albert Frazer. The plans are in Liverpool all the time but turn out to be useless. Jack Frazer dies, having learned that Elizabeth's son, his grandson, William, is not Albert's, but Daniel Fogarty's. He still bequeaths him the Frazer Line, placing it in trust until he comes of age, the company to be run by Elizabeth in the meantime.
46	"Undercurrent"	Lennie Mayne	Martin Worth	16 May 1976
Now in the early 1880s, James spends time with his daughter Charlotte, 9 years old, and her governess, Letty Gaunt (Jill Gascoine). Elizabeth takes over the reins at the Frazer line. In her absence Robert had agreed to join the “South American conference" (a shipping cartel). Rather than join it, she enters the all-male shipping club and undercuts the conference rate. She also begins a relationship with Matthew Harvey (one of her captains). Elizabeth's rate is loss-making, but she banks on having deeper pockets and driving the competition out of business, picking up their ships, and cargo routes, as they fail. Meanwhile, James picnics with his daughter's governess Letty, to the pleasure of Charlotte.
47	"Quarantine"	Michael Hayes	Ian Curteis	23 May 1976
On steamer to Liverpool, three men die of fever in a day. The captain hides this from the port authority to avoid quarantine. The deception is revealed when a head count reveals the crew is three short. The Captain's young daughter falls ill, and, ignoring orders that no one is to come ashore, he sends her to the city on a "johnny boat". The vessel is quarantined for 40 days. As fever (identified as "septecemic plague", transmitted by fleas on the girl's pet guinea pig) spreads on-shore, Robert argues strongly that the port must provide for the welfare of the populace, even at cost to his own business. James attempts to take the quarantined vessel out of port, the master of the boat is now ill and soon after dies – clearly the boat harbours the disease. Elizabeth asks James to return home. Meanwhile the council resolve to arrest those responsible – they fire a warning shot and arrest the boat. The medical officer who blew the whistle is dismissed. All of Liverpool is now under a force majeure government action.
48	"Uncharted Island"	Lennie Mayne	Ian Curteis	30 May 1976
Baines stumbles across a guano island. One of his crewmen realises the value of the find and seeks to record the location. Because he is illiterate, he cannot read the sextant's last setting, instead sketching what it looks like. Back at port James and Baines set about planning to mine the island. James needs capital to put as many ships on the task as possible. Meanwhile while the crewman tells Matt Harvey, who plans to take a Frazer ship to the guano island. Baines beats him senseless. William Gladstone's niece, seeing that the seamen's trouble when Liverpool shipping was shut by the plague was in part due to their lack of additional skills, suggests a plan of basket making: Elizabeth cannot help but laugh at her unworldly, if kind thought. Matt's bad directions mean he doesn't find the island, bringing back instead whale bone (a valuable cargo) and news that the island's guano is too acidic to be of use. Elizabeth is excited at beating James, 'til she learns that he and Baines knew, and took an acidity testing kit allowing him to mine only usable guano. He secures credit at 6%, on condition he provides training for the sailors), and makes off for a full guano run with an expanded fleet.
49	"A Clear Conscience"	Michael Hayes	Cyril Abraham	6 June 1976
Uncle Percy Spendilow is accused of stealing two £5 notes from Frazer's office, and is sentenced to six months hard labour. James' daughter Charlotte has diphtheria. Elizabeth bribes a prison guard to be kind to Spendilow while they try to discover the truth. Robert fusses over James' accounts – trying to count his worth. James reveals that his £15 share has grown perhaps 12,000 times under James' tutelage. Baines and Matt Harvey see Elizabeth's clerk, Drummond, spending freely, and a sting is arranged: he's left to count loose cash, and steals a marked £5 note. Charlotte recovers. James is accused of being too hard on the now-freed Spendilow, but Spendilow confesses he did take the money – the clerk only succumbed to the temptation of Elizabeth's entrapment.
50	"Shipwreck"	Douglas Camfield	Martin Worth	13 June 1976
Elizabeth and James are both trying to buy a tug called the Alice. The Charlotte Rhodes has run aground off Mevagissey. Elizabeth buys the tug for £5000 and offers to tow the Charlotte Rhodes off for £2000. The ship is not insured so Captain Baines is loath to agree. They lift up the bell being carried as cargo and discover that the mast of the wreck has gone through the ship's hull. The ship's carpenter uses the bell as a 'diving bell' to breathe underwater and cut the mast. An angry Elizabeth goes home by train leaving Matt Harvey behind. The episode ends with Robert drunk on scrumpy and learning that Disraeli has called a general election.
51	"The Gamble"	Michael Hayes	Cyril Abraham	20 June 1976
Matt Harvey returns with his cargo of tin cans ruined by rust. Elizabeth is furious at the loss of £20,000 and blames Matt; Baines and Matt commiserate with each other in a bar. Robert approaches Mr. Wilkinson (nephew of the elderly and infirm Mrs. Salt) to buy the shop next door to the store owned by Salt, but is turned down. James then approaches Mrs. Salt to buy the Salt shipping line but is turned down. James finds out that Wilkinson is in debt asks Elizabeth to find out the name of his moneylender. In return he promises to show Elizabeth how to avoid her loss (condensation caused the rust). Mrs. Salt dies and Mr. Wilkinson agrees to give the Salt Line to James in return for paying off his debts. James gives Matt Harvey the command of a ship and he sets off across the Atlantic with Elizabeth on the quay too late to deliver her apology. James borrows £1.25M at 2.5% to fund the 'Brazilian Venture' and puts up all his assets against this with Elizabeth investing her £20,000 in return for a directorship. Baines is put in charge of the Salt Line as Marine Superintendent with the promise of command of his own ship, the fully rigged sailship three masted Christian Radich, later.
52	"Month of the Albatross"	Douglas Camfield	Alun Richards	27 June 1976
Baines is found ill, by Matt Harvey, on the Christian Radich. This illness and the time taken to round 'The Horn' to get home is blamed on the killing of an albatross whose feet have been nailed to the mast. Robert has lost his seat in the election. While wandering later that night he stops a woman, Beatrice May, from committing suicide. Struck by her plight, he agrees to buy her property in Wilmington Street and become her landlord, so she can afford to revive her millinery business. Sarah is concerned by Robert's frequent absences and sends James and Elizabeth to talk to him. There is a nasty confrontation with James, whose innuendo provokes an increasingly defensive Robert. Ultimately Robert reveals what has been going on, insisting that there has been no "impropriety" and that he has stopped James owning the entire street by buying Beatrice's property. Christmas comes and James is in a benign mood with his daughter Charlotte and her governess. Baines returns from sea to spend Christmas with his niece and her two small children, and is horrified to find them living on the streets in the freezing weather. She was one of the tenants evicted by James and tried repeatedly to appeal to him but he refused to see her. The Onedins spend a cheerful Christmas together and James makes a toast – "to us"! The festivities are interrupted when Baines turns up, in a fury. He confronts James, condemns his cruel nature and vows never to sail with him again. James is mortified and tries to plead with his friend, but Baines refuses to listen and walks away. Any remaining Christmas spirit is ruined completely when Elizabeth tells James that she has agreed to make Matt Harvey a partner and that Baines can work for her instead. In reflective mood, James and Letty Gaunt spend the rest of the evening together by the fire.

== Series 5 ==
No.	Title	Directed by	Written by	Original release date
53	"When Troubles Come"	Lennie Mayne	Mervyn Haisman	26 June 1977
Gladstone is Prime minister placing the year at 1892. James is held captive at "Port Baines" after a change of government in Brazil (presumably a reference to the 1891 fall of Deodoro da Fonseca), Baines insists on going ashore to rescue James, even though they haven't spoken for 5 years. Back in Liverpool, Elizabeth is financially stretched and trying to find more credit. Robert too is short of money for stock. A wealthy new client, Thomas Macaulay (Ed Devereaux), arrives with a professed desire to invest in shipping to capitalize on growth in South African trade after the Zulus are quelled. He approaches Elizabeth and negotiates a £100,000 debenture (a loan secured by the assets of the company) at 5% to allow him to invest in the (still privately held) Frazer Line, and she to re-capitalize the company. Baines rescues James, though James is shot during the escape. On the voyage home, James recuperates from the wound to his head. He enjoys being at sea once more, and reconciles with Baines. In Liverpool, James reveals the South American catastrophe to the family. Robert takes the news calmly – too calmly. It emerges that Macaulay has approached him too and loaned him £10,000, in return for a rate of 4% and the management (including voting rights) of Robert's company shares. Charlotte may be sent away to school meaning Miss Letty Gaunt could be let go, but James demurs. At the Bank, James learns that, while many investors were unsecured and have no recourse to Onedin funds, the Bank's main loan is secured: He will be sold up. Elizabeth lets Baines go. James has lost all his ships and Macaulay intends to buy up the lot. But none of these vessels have bailiffs notices attached yet, so Baines and James start discreetly rounding up crews and slip away. Elizabeth and Miss Gaunt mislead Macaulay into thinking James has sailed for Belfast. In fact, he is off to the Baltic.
54	"Rescue"	Gerald Blake	Ian Curteis	3 July 1977
James returns, surprising Harris, to negotiate a return for his six ships full of Black Sea grain. The cargo will pay off interest on Onedin debt but no capital. However, as part of the agreement the bank will foreclose on the house James provided for Miss Letty Gaunt and Charlotte. James suggests that they move into his house and reassures Letty that he will appoint a housekeeper, to protect her reputation. She coyly replies "there is an alternative, James", to which James looks slightly startled. James sails for Turkey and on the way back agrees to take a passenger, Margesson (Edward Hardwicke) to rescue his family for £500. It becomes obvious that the detour is far more difficult and dangerous than James had been led to believe, and ultimately the man finds his house ransacked, his wife dying and his son already dead. James and the crew escape with their lives, but without the promised recompense. James ponders Letty's "alternative". Meanwhile Elizabeth is being pursued by Macaulay to become a partner and have more say in how the company is run as a result of his capital investment. Macaulay also starts buying up James' debts.
55	"Coffin Ships"	Jonathan Alwyn	Ian Curteis	10 July 1977
Several ships have inexplicably sunk on the return voyage from carrying iron plates to Belfast. Harris confronts James over the money he owes the bank (he owes a total of £68000) and says that he has no choice but to sell two of his houses – including Robert's home. It transpires that Dunwoody (Chief Clerk at the Frazer Line) is looking to invest in property, having made his money betting on "sinking ships", much to James' disgust. Robert is distressed when he discovers that his home is to be sold. He learns that Dunwoody has bought his home from Harris, and Dunwoody offers him a 7-year lease at £200 pa, he is outraged by the indignity (and the price) and storms out. Despite the apparent danger, James agrees to Elizabeth's offer to take a cargo of iron plates to Belfast, giving her 10% of the profits. Letty Gaunt is increasingly exasperated by James' steadfast refusal to respond to her hints of marriage. She warns him that she won't be there when he returns. James and Baines set sail for Belfast in the Charlotte Rhodes. James suspects foul play, spotting a particular sailor who signed up for the other ill-fated ships but always seemed to avoid the part of the voyage that resulted in a sinking. He instructs Baines to inspect the ship. Baines discovers that at least two areas, including the heel of the mizzenmast, have been sawn halfway through and the break concealed with pitch. In Belfast, Baines ensures that the sailor Kirk gets drunk enough to be put back on the ship for the voyage home. Kirk sobers up quickly when he realises that he is to share their fate. He confesses to sabotage, naming Macaulay as the man behind the scheme. James promises that Liverpool sailors will hear what Kirk has done, to receive "sailor's justice". Elizabeth arrives at her office to be told that Daniel Fogarty is already there, waiting for her. James returns home to find that Letty has taken up a new governess position.
56	"The Trade Winds"	None credited	Cyril Abraham	17 July 1977
Daniel Fogarty (now played by Tom Adams) has returned from Australia a rich man 16 years after departing at the end of Series 3 (now the mid-1890s), and reveals that Macaulay is his business partner. James has invited Letty Gaunt to dinner at a restaurant. He is nervous and awkward, and clumsily builds up to a proposal. Fortunately, Letty is amused by his characteristic bluntness, and accepts his offer. Fogarty now considers himself a partner in the Frazer Line and is alarmed when he realises the extent to which Elizabeth has indentured the company to Macaulay. He offers her a cheque for the £40,000 she has already spent of Macaulay's investment – she is reluctant to accept, but he insists she takes it to protect herself should Macaulay decide to call in his debt. It is clear that Daniel has already heard enough about Macaulay's activities to have doubts about his erstwhile partner. Both James and Daniel Fogarty want rid of Macaulay, and Elizabeth sets up a meeting between them. They agree on a price for the signed confession that accuses Macaulay of sabotaging ships. Presented with the evidence against him, Macaulay hands over everything that he has acquired in Liverpool. Fogarty returns Robert's voting rights to James. Robert is still angry at the way his house was sold, so chooses to travel to New York rather than be best man at the wedding between James and Letty Gaunt. In New York, his own foolishness leads to him being shanghaied, but fortunately he is spotted by Baines before another captain can claim him. A week before the wedding, James leaves to sort out one of his ships, which has run aground on a sandbank. Letty is frantic that he won't make it back in time, but James assures her that he will be back in a few days. Instead, he delays his return in order to take advantage of a contract to transport sheep, and contacts Letty, telling her to postpone the wedding. Letty tells him that there will be no wedding.
57	"The Stowaway"	Gerald Blake	Martin Worth	24 July 1977
Samuel (who was born in 1860/61 and who should be in his early 30s but is now, along with William, born in 1861/61, is now the same age as Charlotte who was born after 1873) wants to go to sea, but James refuses to take him, so he stows away on the Charlotte Rhodes. James lets him work, but the bosun is a brute and works him hard. James hopes that this will turn him against the sea. Samuel endures, and impresses James, who agrees to let him learn the ways of a sailor. Robert returns from America full of ideas for the shop and wants James to buy his shares in the Onedin Line. James says he can't, as he has no money, but will have when he returns from South America. Once at sea, he tells Captain Baines that he plans to call at Port Baines on the way back from Montevideo because he has heard that there is a regime change. Elizabeth is concerned that William is spending too much time with Charlotte. Finally, she calls at James' house to find that he is using a workshop there to build a new triple cylinder steam engine which Albert Frazer started work on years ago. Letty has been given £500 by Sir Charles Hellsby as part of her "dowry" so that she can be independent when married. When Elizabeth and Daniel Fogarty try to claim William's steam engine as Frazer property because parts from the shipyard were used to build it, Letty uses the money to pay the debt. The Charlotte Rhodes pulls into Port Baines, only to find that Colonel Vega is now President. The regime change did not last. After James has a meeting, he returns to tell Baines that due to their being treatment badly, no English ships have used the port. Colonel Vega promises James compensation in return for his using the port once again.
58	"Dead Man's Cargo"	Jonathan Alwyn	Allan Prior	31 July 1977
Robert blames Baines for allowing Samuel to stow away. Letty admonishes James for talking only of business, after being away for many months. Robert accuses James of inveigling Samuel into sailing with him and angers James by accusing him of thinking of Samuel as the son he never had. Letty has an idea of how to use the new money and buys Whartons mill. The mill is on a tidal river so they can mill and ship the flour themselves. James offers £5000 for Robert's shares which he angrily declines. James sails for Philadelphia while Elizabeth tells William that he is seeing too much of Charlotte. In Philadelphia, James bargains for grain over a bottle of rye whiskey and boards the ship the worse for wear. At home, Letty notes that the price of grain is up again. James overloads the ship and the grain shifts, suffocating a seaman, Yalloop (Harold Goodwin). An angry Baines blames James. Daniel Fogarty and Elizabeth kiss just as William enters the room and they finally reveal that his "Uncle Daniel" is, in fact, his father.
59	"A Hard Life"	Christopher Barry	Cyril Abraham	7 August 1977
James has bought a steamship called the Shearwater and is carrying Polish immigrants bound for USA. William is on board working on the engines. During the voyage, a steam pipe bursts and a crewmember is killed. James calls into Liverpool for repairs and offers to take the immigrants to America on the Charlotte Rhodes. On his return William greets Elizabeth as "Mama" but Daniel as "Sir" while James tells William that he is not to see Charlotte because they are first cousins. Daniel also reveals his plans to set up seamen's homes and make charitable donations. Whilst waiting for the repairs one of the Polish girls, Maritza (Lesley Dunlop), takes lace she has made into Robert's shop. Robert offers to give her a job but Samuel tries to dissuade her as he says the workroom is a sweatshop. He gives her money to go to America but Robert finds out and is furious. He tells Samuel that he can go to work in a store in New York. William meets up with Letty & Charlotte and is invited to tea. James returns while he is there and is not happy. The Shearwater sets sail for America; however, William is sure that things are not right saying that corrosion in the engine is causing a blockage and a build up of pressure. During a storm, the pipe bursts again and they have to finish the trip under sail. Maritza injures her hand in a door during the storm and James has to operate on her saving her hand but she will never make lace again. James decides that owning steamships is too much of a problem and vows to charter them in future.
60	"The Hostage"	Paul Ciappessoni	Martin Worth	14 August 1977
James and Baines sail to Naples. In Liverpool, William and Charlotte arrange to liaise at Robert's shop and William advises the assistant, Miss Purvis, who has been sacked for poor timekeeping, to see Letty, who is setting up business mending old sacks. Daniel berates William for not calling him Father, while Elizabeth storms out saying that she has looked after him alone for 17 years so why change. James has a new local cook on board but discovers that he has smuggled others on board, who take over the ship at gunpoint. They find the moneybox, but it is empty. On shore, James discovers that the Mafia are involved and want their cut. The ship is taken over by the banditti and Baines is held hostage. James bargains with them saying that he will pay a maximum of £1,000, not the £10,000 demanded, for their release. In Naples a double bluff takes place with James giving the Mafia leader £1,000 and eventually Baines is released, although he questions whether James was bluffing or being serious. In an act of pride and face saving, the Mafia leader throws the money into the sea and Baines declares that it could have kept him for the rest of his days without having to take orders from anyone. Martin Benson plays one of the Italians.
61	"Uncharted Waters"	Gerald Blake	Martin Worth	21 August 1977
James has a half-unloaded cargo of jute when he finds out that the price has fallen. He orders Captain Baines to reload the cargo to take to Scotland. The load falls and lands on Baines breaking his arm. James calls a doctor and orders Baines to rest ashore. At home, James and Letty argue over her business ventures and when he again says that he wants her to be his wife, she says she cannot be Anne. She takes the portrait of Anne from the wall and James loses his temper and strikes Letty. He apologises profusely. Robert has great plans for a new store and shows off a model proudly. He takes it to Daniel Fogarty who assumes he wants to borrow money. Robert says he has secured a loan at the bank, but in an act of generosity Daniel tears up the loan agreement for £10,000 telling Robert that he wants to prove to Elizabeth that he does not always just think of money. Sarah Onedin is trying to raise funds to build a new seamen's home in Liverpool and wants James' old warehouse, but Letty also wants it to expand her business. When Sarah asks James to donate it, he says the price is £10,000. James asks Robert to sign an agreement to buy two new ships. Robert refuses saying he will sell his Onedin Line shares to him for £18,000. Sarah persuades Daniel to give her charity £10,000 to buy the warehouse therefore giving James money with which to buy Robert's shares. Elizabeth finds out that William and Charlotte are meeting in secret. She and Daniel tell him he is being sent to London. He refuses saying that when he assumes control of Frazers he will cut them out of the company. James decides to take Letty and Charlotte to Scotland, but at the last minute he tells Charlotte that she is going to London to stay with her Aunt Mary, and James and Letty sail to Scotland without her.
62	"A Close Run Thing"	Jonathan Alwwyn	Cyril Abraham	28 August 1977
Robert shows Sarah their new house. Daniel has bought a shipyard to be run in partnership with Elizabeth; she approves and they kiss. On board his new ship, the Trident, Baines recognises an old drunk seaman, Billy. Elizabeth tells William they plan to wed and says congratulations 'Father'. They plan to let him run the company on a trial basis. During the voyage, the 'crimped' sailors plan to kill James and take the ship. Billy overhears their plans, but is coerced into silence. Billy warns Letty and is wounded. James and Baines fend off the attackers. Ashore Letty buys Billy a new suit and gives a few sovereigns. Daniel tells Elizabeth that he has to go to Scotland on important business. On the train, he reveals that they are actually going to Balmoral where he is to be knighted. At the wedding, it turns out that Elizabeth and Robert both thought that the other had told James that he was to be best man. Robert receives a telegram saying that James and Letty have also been married, on board ship, by Captain Baines.

== Series 6 ==
Broadcast 16 July – 17 September 1978, (10 episodes).

=== (E63) No Smoke Without Fire ===
Written by: Mervyn Haisman.

The new series lead-in is an aerial shot of the Onedin Line's flagship Orlando, and cameo brooch vignettes of the lead actors. Sir Daniel asks James to carry £100,000 of gold bullion from South Africa – off the books: he is liquidating his South African holdings for fear the country is becoming strife-ridden.

James charges 2% of the value of the cargo, jokingly throwing in a 'free passage' for Daniel who smiles. Baines jokes that James might as well run up the 'skull and cross bones', such is the size of the fee. Josiah Beaumont (a new character) and the new head of Mr Harris's bank (he has sold his bank) calls. Twenty-year-old William suggests they dine at his club to discuss business. Letty is trying to become pregnant and tells Elizabeth that she is concerned that she might be barren. Letty has also made a tapestry to put in place of Anne's picture.

Dunwoody tells Elizabeth that Mr Simmons (a client who has built 4 vessels with Frazers previously) has cancelled his order for a ship. To get the order William quoted low initially and then tried to push the price up with extras. Beaumont suggests that he can coerce Simmons to deal with Frazers. Elizabeth insults Beaumont for forcing Harris out and argues with William who says that Beaumont can be of tremendous help to them.

Meanwhile, James voyages home and the Panama Canal – which will mean ships will no longer need sail around Cape Horn– is an active idea although Baines regrets the loss of bravery in sailing that will ensue once difficult passages are avoided. A hazing ceremony on board sees a young boy shaven and tarred and feathered by a pirate Neptune.

Samuel has come home: also grown up. At a Bank party – quite unthinkable under Mr Harris - William confides to Samuel that his goal in 5 years is to be richer than any one in the room. Beaumont has convinced Simmons to have his new ship built with Frazers who tells Elizabeth that it is the last ship Frazers will be building for him. He tells Elizabeth that Beaumont threatened to take away his support if he had the ship built in another yard. On hearing this, she declares to Beaumont that she is dining with Mr Harris tomorrow night, 'such an upright man'! She leaves taking William with her. Later Samuel tells Letty about this and that within 5 minutes all the other guests had left as well.

A fire starts on board the Christian Radich – wool is burning. The fire is put out, but once again we learn that James is sailing under-insured. Daniel discovers that three bars of gold have been stolen and James threatens a rope across the back of the man who has stolen the gold. However, one of the sailor points out that it is now against the law (recall that in series one merchant vessels sailed under Napoleonic Naval laws where mutiny or striking an officer was punishable by death). The young boy who was hazed previously has stolen the gold and confesses saying, "why should you have all that gold". The sailor who spoke out against flogging also speaks up for the boy and James lets him off saying that they can both crew a ship round the Horn and that the boy is now his responsibility.

The mate who found the gold beats Daniel to the deck, blaming him for stopping him marrying a rich Chinese girl some years earlier although apparently Daniel had saved him from sharks years before; he says they are now even.

As the episode closes, James bids for business with Fogarty against the Frazer line. James goes to put up a shield he has brought back from Africa only to see that Letty has replaced Anne's picture with her tapestry.

=== (E64) Collision Course ===
Written by: Cyril Abraham

On board the Neptune Baines asks how James got the contract for transporting steel plates instead of Frazers – "blood is thicker than water". "So is zinc", James replies, "and that is what contracts are made of". William's relations with Beaumont grow tighter, as he confides his dismay that Elizabeth and Daniel would not give the contract to "his" line. Petulant and demanding, he orders an old Captain to sea, and demands a fast passage, threatening him if he's slow, despite dense fog. Samuel grows increasingly unhappy at the future Robert has planned for him. Parents pass on what they have learned to their children, the children struggle to take on the role of their parents, un-aware of how little they know, but youthful and winning. The Frazer ship that William has urged out to sea with Captain Oliphant in command passes a "red and white" buoy, but then they see a black and white buoy – they're on the wrong side of the channel and in the fog ram and sink James' ship the Neptune. All hands abandon ship but no lives are lost.

Lessons continue to be learned about honesty and decency. William applies more pressure on Oliphant and sends key witnesses from his own ship offshore. Sensing that Oliphant is weak he takes Beaumont's advice and has him sign a statement that he was on the correct side of the channel and that James was crossing in front of him thus binding him to this falsehood. Again, the series is a lesson in the evolution of UK law as Robert tells Beaumont he has placed his house in his wife's name, protecting it from creditors.

Samuel is courting Charlotte, but she has only William on her mind. Robert and Sarah discuss a match between Charlotte and Samuel and both agree that it would ensure continuity of future 'family' business.

As the accusations fly, Oliphant finds himself in an impossible situation, caught between a rock and a hard place, and hangs himself. William has pangs of conscience and asks himself 'why'? – malevolent Beaumont tries to convince William it is a good thing and now renders Oliphant's testimony uncontestable. Robert points out that the dead cannot testify. James has realised that the location of the sunken steel plates and his anchor would be proof positive of the position of the two ships. The insurers agree and pay up.

Elizabeth is happy for William to learn that there is more to a company than money. Growing up means more than acquiring a moustache. They agree to pay Oliphant's dependents a 'modest' pension for life.

Shock ending...during a celebration dinner Robert gets a bone stuck in his throat and chokes to death in front of them.

=== (E65) Double Dealers ===
Written by Nick McCarty

Following Robert's death, the will is read by Mr Andrews. Under the 1883 married women's property act, the house is Sarah's. However, there is a codicil stating that the department store is left to Samuel for as long as it is under his personal management; if not, it reverts to Sarah. A representative of the salvage company, Buxton, approaches James regarding the salvage of a ship, the Indian Queen, and its cargo of copper sheets. It is yet another ship under Captain Barry has foundered and claimed insurance and he suspects the owner, Mr Lynn, of double-dealing. Daniel and Samuel argue over a deal to buy a mill in Manchester, which he and Robert had agreed prior to his untimely death. Samuel says that he does not intend to honour it, as he was not part of the original arrangement. However, Samuel says that he plans to go ahead with Robert's parcel post service and Daniel agrees to supply the linen material for Letty to make the goods, which Samuel will sell via the catalogue.

James calls on Elizabeth and discusses insurance matters. Dunwoody also calls with some papers and confirms that William bought into part of the cargo that went down using Fraser company money. William tells Beaumont that he cannot afford to cover the claim if it is not settled. James and Baines look for the Indian Queen, having learnt from the drunken captain that it went down a mile off Cromer Point and suspect it was deliberately sunk.

Elizabeth accuses William of using company money to buy the cargo and learns that if the transaction was illegal the insurance company will not pay. Mr Lilly tells Beaumont that there was in fact no cargo on the ship, William joins them. The Indian Queen was an old ship and was scuttled with no cargo as the manifest was false. The copper sheets will be sold in due course as well as claiming the insurance money. William is warned not to breathe a word, as is Beaumont.

Letty voices her concerns about not being a mother; James says 'give it time'. The first mate of the Indian Queen arrives and tells James the truth about the Indian Queen and exactly where it went down. The diver is persuaded by Buxton to examine the hold, offering him 50 guineas and 100 guineas for his family if he is killed. The diver opens the hold discovering a dead man who was trapped. The escaped air dislodges the ship and it goes over a ledge into deep water; now they will not be able to prove whether there was a cargo on board.

James confronts William about the missing cargo and hands a shocked William the rosary of the man found dead in the ship saying 'keep it as a memento'.

=== (E66) Stand by to Go About (compasses, theft, canals, mediumship) ===
Written by: John Lucarotti

The episode (confusingly set in 1883, and the death of “that fellow Karl Marx who has just died”) opens with James explaining to Letty, who is gaining her sea legs, that their magnetic compass has deviated – paradoxically, because James' new two-masted ketch the Falcon is not carrying her normal cargo of steel plates – for which her compass has been calibrated with deviating magnets.

Daniel meets with Sir Norman – they discuss a £50,000 robbery in Manchester. Their main question is to break the Liverpool to Manchester transport monopoly of the Mersey docks, the harbor board and rail company. "The government will do nothing", suspects Daniel. Sir Norman retorts, "You wouldn't 'want' the government telling you how to run your business would you? We don't do things that way in this country, thank God!". They briefly discuss the death of Karl Marx and anarchy.

Elizabeth suggests the canal as an alternative to the rail monopoly – Daniel pooh-poohs the idea as too slow (the canal was shut as rail replaces the horse), then realises that freight could be trafficked by steam in the canal... Elizabeth suggests they discuss it in bed. Cross cut, and Letty suggests James put his arms around her...

Talking to Sir Norman, Daniel expounds on his idea now: to tow the ocean going steamers up widened canal lanes all the way from the port of Liverpool to Manchester.

Samuel continues to develop his idea of parcel post (mail order) trading. An idea pioneered in the United States by Sears.

William continues to reveal himself to be a naïve and a more callous and less humane person than he had appeared.

James takes on a cargo with a Mr Jack Wadham, with no bills of lading required or desired. The Fennian strike and blowing up of a town hall motivate the cargo – transfer of a rich man's possessions. Sarah begins seeing a medium – she becomes convinced through his simple predictions that he can see the future and is in contact with the dead Robert.

James suspects that Wadham and his cargo are not what they appear and opens the crates. Wadham discovers him and confesses that they are stolen and holds James and Baines at gunpoint. James pretends that they are on the wrong course by deviating the compass and having put up warning flags land at a cove in Wales. They are met by customs officers and Wadham is arrested while James sets sail again with £5000 in reward money. 'Not bad for one trip' says James!

=== (E67) The Upright Man ===
Written by Douglas Watkinson

A gentleman, Murchison, is selling up his stores and ships including a schooner, the Jenny Peak. James is interested in the schooner but not the rest of the fleet. William has made a good offer. Letty confides to Elizabeth that she is pregnant, James doesn't know yet. Baines is told by the captain that the Norwegians are crying out for pianos. He says that he has a piano he can have for £10 and sell for £25 minimum. James tells Elizabeth that if she lets him take the schooner off her hands he will withdraw from the bidding. She says that Frazers have made no offer for the Murchison line. William has offered £26,000 and Beaumont says he has agreed to buy on his behalf.

Elizabeth tells Beaumont that Frasers has a reputation for honesty. Beaumont replies that the Fogarty yards are building several ships and Beaumont threatens to call in his loans. James bids for a Persian carpet and buys it for 28 guineas showing it to Letty who tries to tell James she is pregnant. William apologises to Elizabeth and says that it is time to find a place of his own, she agrees. James offers to sell Samuel the warehouse he is buying at Murchison Quay for £3000. Samuel plans to sell salmon to hotels and James offers to supply ice for storage as he is going to Norway. James tells Daniel he would be a fool not to buy the Murchison Line, as it is part of the South African Conference.

William and Charlotte meet at his new apartment, Letty waits up and tells her that Lucy has tonsillitis, so where were you? Charlotte says she was with William but they only kissed, however Letty notices that Charlotte's pearls are missing and suspects that more has transpired. James, Beaumont and William meet; James says he only wants the schooner and will withdraw if he gets it for a fair price.

James meets Murchison who says that he does not only want the money but wants to leave a legacy behind, as he has no sons. Daniel tells William that Beaumont is using him and that he will not have his wife threatened. He tells Beaumont that Murchison is transferring his loan to another bank and if Beaumont sets foot in the office again, he will run the Fraser line down to nothing.

James bargains for ice in Norway and Baines discovers that he has been taken for a fool with the piano. Baines finds a crewmember after he has been mugged and robbed, they go back to the bar and find who did it and make them buy the piano as retribution, for £26. Unloading it, they deliberately drop it on the quay.

At home, James hurries back to Daniel to find out about the schooner, the Jenny Peak. Baines tells Jack about the piano and spins a yarn and Jack takes the bait. James tells Letty that he is renaming the Jenny Peak the Letty Gaunt.

=== (E68) The Reverend's Daughter ===
Written by Simon Masters

Daniel shows the plans for the Liverpool to Manchester ship canal to Sir Norman and his business partners, noting that the Railway monopoly will fight them all the way. Meanwhile, the ladies discuss the latest fashion in the room next door; Elizabeth is extremely bored by the small talk and is concerned with what Daniel may be negotiating. He says that the canal will cost £10m to build but is a 'small' investment to make for future prosperity. Elizabeth says that she was born and bred in Liverpool and accuses Daniel of being a traitor for the effect the canal will have on the shipyards. She says it will be the death of Liverpool.

James tells Letty, who has still not told him she is pregnant, to come to Africa with him. Still not willing to tell him she is pregnant, she says that she cannot because she has bought a shredding machine and 'has to be there when it is delivered'! A man called Branigan, clutching his daughter, is evicted to release land for the canal. A Reverend Webster asks Baines if they can take them to Lagos. He knows James as they are related through Anne and are in fact cousins. In an orphanage, Sarah sees Branigan and his daughter and pledges all her help. Daniel tells Elizabeth that the South African Conference has thrown out the Murchison Line.

Branigan signs on as ships carpenter while Sarah introduces Marcus Symmons, the director of the orphanage, to Elizabeth. They need new premises and benefactors. He flatters Elizabeth and says he needs 3–4 thousand pounds. James shows Hannah Webster around the ship and Baines looks on with slight concern, as Letty is not on the voyage. Elizabeth invites Marcus Symmons to dine with her and says that he interests her and does he try to seduce women for profit or pleasure. Symmons shows her the orphanage which has no heat or sanitation and that he would flatter any woman to get what he needs. On board ship, Branigan tells Hannah Webster about his daughter and she berates him for abandoning her, much to Baines annoyance, who says it is none of her business.

Letty confides in Elizabeth that she has still not told James. Elizabeth tells Daniel that she has been entertaining herself with a young man and that a girl has been thrown out of her home because of the canal, making them beggars. Daniel denies it and says someone else is buying the land. The crew are sick due to foul water and put in for fresh supplies. Daniel suspects someone of cheating the company and buying the land near the locks to resell at an exorbitant profit. He has the name of the company and accuses Sir Norman who admits it but says it will not stand up in court. Daniel says that he will use all his wealth to prove it unless Norman agrees to sell the land to them at the same price he paid for it.

While they are at anchor waiting for fresh water, the ship is boarded by bandits. James and the crew fend off the attackers and Branigan saves Hannah's life. James tells Branigan that when they return he will give him enough money for a new start.

=== (E69) Highly Explosive ===
Written by Mervyn Haisman

James returns from Africa after 2 months away and finds Letty 6 months pregnant. He is furious not only with not being told but also because he does not want any more children. He storms out. William also learns that Charlotte is pregnant much to his dismay but she assumes they will marry now he is 21. James comes back drunk and apologises and Baines says it was his fault but he thought it would take James' mind off things. Elizabeth and Daniel argue once again over his plans for the ship canal while they learn that Sir Norman Truscott is to apply for The Chiltern Hundreds.

Charlotte tells Samuel that William has asked her to marry him while William confides in Beaumont. He says that James' wrath will not last forever but marriage will and advises against. James sails to Ireland and once again finds Samuel on board who requests a passage as he is considering providing ships furnishings. At his 21st birthday party, Elizabeth presents William with the title deeds to the Fraser Line and yards and a gold fob watch. Beaumont arrives and insults Elizabeth, Daniel tells him never to do that again or he will regret it. Beaumont advises them both not make an enemy of him or they will regret it; they both leave the party. Charlotte has given William a ring but his says he cannot accept it and that he cannot marry her. She is distraught.

At sea, James comes across an abandoned steamer. He and Samuel board her and find high explosives in the hold as well as leaking nitroglycerine. After much wheeler dealing, Beaumont brokers a deal to sell the yard for £205,000, the yard being William's now he is 21. Charlotte tells Letty that William won't marry her and that she is going to have a baby. James and Samuel put the leaking explosive over the side and one box explodes. A steam launch approaches and they are told the cargo is government property and is to remain secret. James tells them about the leaking nitroglycerine and threatens to leave unless a salvage deal is agreed. The captain concedes and says how much? James says: 'let's talk about it'.

=== (E70) A Sea of Troubles ===
Written by Douglas Watkinson

James has sent Baines to bring back a ship, the Amarillos. The captain, an old enemy of Baines, is dying. His wife, Catherine, pleads with Baines to take him back to Liverpool to die. At home, James comments that Charlotte is putting on weight. William learns that Beaumont has sold the yard and has given an acre of land to William as a bonus and tells him that he is to stand for city councillor. James learns about Beaumont's ambitions and Samuel wants James to sponsor Daniel to stand against him.

Letty tells Elizabeth, who says that it would conflict with his role as director of the ship canal project. Catherine tells Baines that she will soon be a rich widow and asks for his advice. Samuel confronts William over his refusal to marry Charlotte and they fight, both of them the worse for wear as a result. James confronts Charlotte and Letty tells him the truth – James calls her a trollop and says that William will damn well marry her. James confronts Elizabeth who defends William and James says that she is a fine one to talk. William again refuses to accept his responsibilities and Daniel strikes an already battered William across the face.

Captain Robert Bragg is buried at sea and Catherine asks Baines if he can recommend a reliable captain for the Amarillos, which she has now inherited and plans to keep. Baines is obviously attracted to her but recommends a captain Blake telling Catherine that he would be too set in his ways and rough and ready for her. Letty tells Charlotte that she is to go to Aunt Mary's for a 'holiday', after which the baby will be adopted. She says that she never wants to see it.

Back in Liverpool James boards the Amarillos and tells Baines that he has bought the ship from Bragg for £3000 in a deal arranged before they set sail and that he will arrange a proper draft of the money for Catherine. She declares to Baines: 'that was a lot of speculation about nothing' but that she hopes they can see each other from time to time.

=== (E71) Men of Honour ===
Written by Simon Masters

A Mr Mcormack boards James' ship in Ireland; he is from Lloyds and wants to examine the ship to make sure it is 'tight, staunch and strong'. He is not satisfied, and a Mr O'malley from the Board of Trade also wants to examine the ship after complaints from the crew and the cargo of spuds is unloaded.

Beaumont tells William that he wants to raise Liverpool like a phoenix from the ashes and that he will reward anyone who goes with him. Elizabeth schemes and asks Marcus Symmons to run against Daniel. Daniel learns of this and asks where his financial backing is coming from. William tells Beaumont about Daniels involvement in the ship canal and what it will mean to Liverpool. James realises that he has been tricked into letting his cargo go and sets sail for Liverpool with only he and Baines as crew. Daniel asks Elizabeth if she has heard of Portside Holdings and, under pressure from Elizabeth, William tells her that he has seen these documents in Beaumont's office. Elizabeth says that if they tell the papers about Beaumont's plans he will be crucified. On reading the newspaper headlines decrying him, Beaumont says 'may you burn in hell forever' and tells William that Daniel has earned his undying enmity.

Symmons becomes a City Councillor and Daniel announces, to Elizabeth's shock, that he has accepted the nomination to stand as parliamentary candidate for 'Manchester'. Letty goes into labour and James arrives in time for the birth of a son. His joy is short-lived when the doctor tells him that the baby is unlikely to survive more than a few days.

=== (E72) The Fortune Hunters ===
Written by Cyril Abraham

The episode opens 10 days after the funeral of James and Letty's baby son. They are both grieving but unable to comfort each other. Elizabeth and Sarah try to help Letty but she's not interested until she hears that her business is having problems. Letty persuades James to go to sea: 'it would be best for both of us'. One of Letty's employees brings a map to Letty of the harbour front. Beaumont is implicated in buying up land to sell to the harbour board at a huge profit. Samuel visits Letty and tells her and Sarah that he has asked Charlotte to marry him. He says that if they don't give permission they will elope. They marry in a quiet ceremony.

Daniel tells Elizabeth that Sir Joshua Thackery has died meaning there will be a bye election for the Manchester ward which he should win. To please Elizabeth he shows her his letter of resignation from the ship canal project to which Elizabeth replies 'I do love you'. They go to see William when Beaumont is there and tell William what is going on. Elizabeth tells William that the amount offered by Beaumont, £300,000, for the yard is nowhere near enough and that she and Daniel will match the offer. William decides not to sell the yard to either of them. Beaumont leaves swearing that 'for as long as he lives he will make it his business to ruin Daniel'.

Elizabeth tells William that he is to go abroad for a year and they will run the Fraser Line until he returns. Meanwhile, James is sailing to Africa. A passenger, Mr Peterson, tells him a tale about untold riches in a very dangerous area marked by a white mast. They land and the ship stands off at a safe distance away from the reef. Peterson shows them that the mast sticking out of the sand is in fact that of a sunken galleon. It has gold and diamonds in its hold. He was there the previous year with two partners who died in the earlier attempt.

He takes them to where he began digging but suddenly a storm blows up so James and Baines take shelter. When the storm abates, they find Peterson dead, the mast of the galleon having fallen on him. James realises that their ship won't find them as they were using the mast to take bearings. However, discovering parts of the Osprey on the beach they realise that it must have been wrecked on the reef during the storm. They find an old rowing boat and set off into the shipping lanes, drifting for days, reminiscing about the past and fearing the worst. James now calls Baines by his Christian name, Will.

At home, the Osprey has finally been posted as missing and Letty is distraught. Charlotte goes into labour and gives birth to a son. Suddenly there is a scream from a servant and James walks in saying 'you look like you've seen a ghost'. He and Letty embrace. James says that he and Baines were finally picked up by a steamer, which has taken 6 weeks to return. The episode finishes with the christening of the new baby, who has been named Robert Baines Onedin. Baines is to be godfather.

== Series 7 ==
Broadcasts 22 July – 23 September 1979, (10 episodes).

=== (E73) Liverpool Bound ===
Written by Mervyn Haisman

Two years have passed and James and Letty have been away at sea on the Christian Radich for six months. Letty is bored and wants to go home. They come across a couple adrift in a small boat, a Professor Dawson and his daughter Emma. At home, Elizabeth uses a new communications device called a telephone. She and Daniel have not seen each other for 3 months and all is not well between Charlotte and Samuel. Professor Dawson has been in Egypt excavating the tomb of Neferhotep and is zealously protecting a bag containing a mysterious object. It transpires that they have been on a dhow, which was transporting lepers to Crete. James isolates them in their cabin and Emma develops a fever.

Elizabeth goes to London to see Daniel and surprises him in his apartment with the daughter of Lord Talbot. William has sent a letter to Charlotte asking to call on her when he returns from Nice. Samuel says no and declares that he will never allow him in his house. Emma fears that the content of the bag is causing her fever and Dawson throws it over the side. Within minutes her fever breaks. It contained the mummified head of a young boy and Dawson says that he was told that anyone taking it would be cursed. Charlotte reads William's letter asking for forgiveness.

James shows Letty their new house. It is a mansion with 12 bedrooms when she was expecting a small villa. She is very unhappy and James declares: 'damn it woman is there no pleasing you'!

=== (E74) The Homecoming ===
Written by Mervyn Haisman

The episode opens with Baines engaged in a fight (Baines having been accused of cheating at cards) on the quay ending up with a broken arm. A Captain Burgess intervenes and patches him up. James reprimands Baines and says that a spell ashore will do him good including time spent on the floor of The Exchange. William calls on Charlotte but is turned away. He talks to Samuel on the floor of The Exchange and is told to stay away from Charlotte or he will 'horsewhip him in public'.

Elizabeth tells Dunwoody, who is playing an increasingly important role in the company, that she plans to go away for a holiday and that they need to discuss his salary and position. In an attempt to save their marriage, Daniel asks Elizabeth to go horse riding with him. She declines only to change her mind and return home to find Daniel on the telephone telling his mistress, Angela Taplow, not to call him at his house. Captain Burgess looks for Baines with a bottle of whiskey but finds James instead and they discuss business over a glass or two. James points out that Burgess' ship has been impounded and offers a partnership to pay off the debts on his steamer, the Black Pearl.

William encounters Charlotte walking with her pram and asks to see his son but she refuses telling him that she despises him. At the quay in a shock ending to the episode William makes an heroic attempt to stop a runaway carriage. He succeeds saving many lives but is thrown off hitting his head and is killed. Charlotte is bereft telling Samuel that it would have been such a simple thing to have let him see his son. After the funeral Daniel is set to return to London in a few hours, however Elizabeth says 'walk with me in the garden' hinting at a reconciliation.

=== (E75) The Paddy Westers ===
Written by Douglas Watkinson

On the quay, a gentleman called Orsova and his wife asks where he can find 'Paddy West'. Because of Baines' broken arm, a notorious Captain Blake will be in charge of the voyage to New York. On learning this several of the crew have jumped ship. Paddy West arranges passages to America for criminals and individuals with dubious backgrounds who need to avoid immigration on Ellis Island, for a fee. The owner of the Black Pearl, Seth Burgess, asks Paddy West to find him seven crewmen for the voyage. West assumes they are for Burgess' steam ship. West tricks Burgess into believing the men are experienced saying that one of them has been round the Horn twice; he in fact walked twice around a table with a 'horn' on it.

Elizabeth has promoted Dunwoody to Managing Director and plans to go on holiday. Sarah tells Elizabeth about her psychic and that he has foretold that Elizabeth will be 'provided for'. Burgess points out that the contract Baines has signed to deliver traction engines won't work as there will be no heavy lifting gear at the port. A solicitor, Mr Pettifer, arrives looking for a Robert Onedin. William has left a large legacy for his son Robert amounting to £20,000. Elizabeth remembers what Sarah told her about being 'provided for'. Seth Burgess shows Elizabeth his plans to replace piston engines with a new design of turbine similar to the reaction turbine patented by Sir Charles Parsons. She says she will show it to her chief draughtsman and Seth suggests dinner to discuss it. On board the Christian Radich another criminal attempts to kill James but his life is saved by Orsova who reveals that he and his wife are a Count and Countess fleeing from Rumelia and that she is pregnant.

At home, Baines goes looking for Paddy West and Elizabeth calls on Burgess saying that she is interested in his ideas. She accepts his invitation to dinner, introducing him to Letty and Sarah who will also be joining them. Burgess tells Elizabeth about Baines' problem and she agrees to provide a ship with lifting gear for £250. Baines beats West in an arm wrestling contest winning back the £35 fee for the 'Paddy Westers' with James saying, 'back to sea for you where you'll keep out of mischief'.

=== (E76) Dirty Cargo ===
Written by: Nick McCarty

The episode opens with Elizabeth out riding. She is splattered with mud by another rider, a Viscount Marston (played by Maurice Colbourne later to be the star of Howards Way). Lady Elizabeth sets to sea, Dunwoody having pinched a cargo of "mining equipment" from under James' nose. Baines signs a sailor with his mate's ticket who reveals that Elizabeth is likely carrying a cargo of guns – James sets sail to catch her steamer and let her know. Elizabeth's ship is making 12 knots so James will have his work cut out. A fast clipper like Cutty Sark would make 17 knots.

On land, James' new steamer, the Black Pearl, is still laid up and can't be certified by Lloyd's. The boiler needs replacing, he needs £1200 for a half share, £600 to bail out Burgess's debts, and £500 for the new boiler: James ponders the wisdom of his deal and dealing with Burgess.

After the mate falls out of the rigging, James stakes him in his gold mining quest in the Transvaal for 50 guineas receiving 10% of any profit in return.

Elizabeth has coaled at Jarvis Bay. Charlotte's romantic disdain for business and desire for love sees her increasingly unhappy with life with Samuel and her eyes wander to more exciting and doting men, including Seth Burgess. Letty is shocked to learn that one of her sweatshop girls has quit her factory work to become a prostitute – swapping 15 shillings (£0.75) a week for hard work for £4 a week on her back.

James has spotted Elizabeth, but how to stop her? At daylight, James flies a bogus distress flag (against every rule of the sea). The cargo is guns, secreted beneath a layer of mining equipment. James offers to find a customer for the guns at £1 a piece. Elizabeth is unsure what to do and asks for £2. James agrees thinking that he can get £6 selling them to the government at the Cape. The Major refuses threatening to alert the authorities if James does not hand them over. James is £1000 out of pocket and Lady Elizabeth is home free. Baines chuckles to himself as James writhes at the loss.

=== (E77) To Honour and Obey ===
Written by Roger Parkes

The episode opens with a young lad, Tom, asking Baines for work. A Senor De Silva calls on James to carry a valuable cargo to the Azores. Letty suggests that Samuel give Charlotte an allowance to give her independence. He tells Charlotte that he is giving her £3000 and his 15% share of Onedin shares. She is overwhelmed. She asks him to go to London with her to see the exhibition of inventions and that she has invited Seth Burgess to dinner to discuss business. Samuel declines saying that he is too busy and Charlotte storms out. Charlotte later entertains Burgess alone.

On board the Thorsoe, a crewman 'Glasgow' McDade plots to steal some of De Silva's cargo and involves the lad Tom. The bosun queries the loading of the ship and the amount of sail saying that they are against new procedures. Baines replies that his only law is 'to honour and obey' him. Elizabeth suggests that due to their mutual circumstances she and Sarah should live together in one house. A gentleman delivers an expensive riding coat for Elizabeth, a present from a Viscount Marston who splattered her with mud while out riding recently.

'Glasgow' gets Tom to get the keys to the hold from James' cabin and steals some of De Silva's valuables threatening Tom to keep quiet or else. The bosun discovers them and Glasgow stabs him to death throwing his body overboard. They are questioned by James and swear on the Bible, saying that the Bosun was drunk and fell overboard. Baines suspects the boy is lying to protect himself. Burgess calls on Charlotte and persuades her to invest £2000 in the Black Pearl. He later reveals his true nature when he tells a mate that he plans to disappear abroad with the money. McCabe and his partner are finally arrested after James discovers the stolen items and sets sail with Baines and Tom as crew telling Baines to let Tom take the helm.

=== (E78) Running Free ===
Written by Roger Parkes

At the quayside, Burgess tells James that he has the money to buy back his half of the Black Pearl as a result of a bequest from a relative. At home, Letty finds a baby abandoned on her doorstep. She tells Elizabeth that it is a foundling, a result of one of her employees indulging in a 'more profitable' trade. Charlotte gives the cash to Burgess for her share of the Black Pearl who says that he will be sailing to the Mediterranean to generate business. Samuel and Charlotte go to Elizabeth's ball and Charlotte gets very drunk. Viscount Charles Marston arrives and Elizabeth 'accidentally' spills her drink on him, to which he replies 'touché'! Samuel argues with Charlotte who flounces out of the ball.

She takes the rest of her money and her Onedin shares, packs her bags and goes to the quay to look for Burgess. She finds him and says that they are kindred spirits and that she wants to go with him, to which he finally agrees. Letty tries to persuade Samuel to go after her but he says 'let her go'. When James learns about Charlotte and Burgess, he is absolutely furious, vowing to offer rewards in every port to anyone who finds them.

The owner of the orphanage, who has taken over from Simmons, tells Letty that he can't take the foundling because of its background and that it may carry infections. Letty threatens to withdraw her patronage if he refuses. She later tells James that she wants to set up her own orphanage to which James replies 'it's your money'. She replies, 'I do love you'

=== (E79) The Suitor ===
Written by Simon Masters

James learns that Elizabeth has won a contract that he thought was his. He erupts with anger and clutches his stomach. The doctor says that James has an ulcer and prescribes a milk and fish diet and rest. He says that if the ulcer bursts on board ship he can't guarantee his return. James says that it is nothing that a sea breeze can't put right. Elizabeth tells James that she declined the contract.

Charles Marston arrives at James' office. He says a passenger called Bullen has sailed on one of James' ships and he is very keen to trace him. He asks James to send a cable instructing Bullen to be kept on board once they dock. He says he cheated him out of a considerable amount of money on a timber contract. He tells James that he bought Imperial Staffs recently and is to let a contract to carry his clay every month. It transpires that he was the one who offered the contract to Elizabeth and that if James gives him Bullen he can have the contract.

On board ship, Bullen rescues Tom the cabin boy from a mad crewmember. At home Sarah introduces her friend, a retired naval captain called Arbuthnot Dampier (played by Patrick Troughton, the second Doctor Who) to her family. Samuel disapproves. Dampier says that he inherited an estate and owns a steam yacht called Amazon (the yacht used in filming was, in fact, the ex-steam yacht Amazon). James says that at least he has an estate so he can't be after Sarah's money, which was all that worried him.

Tom shows Baines the cable saying Bullen is wanted for thieving. Sarah tells Dampier that her medium, Pilgrim, has told her that her late husband Robert objects to him. Dampier and later James confront Pilgrim offering him money or threatening him with exposure and legal action as a fraud. Marston says he needs to find a way of tempting Elizabeth and invites her to tender to deliver an entire railway system for Chile right through the Andes. He invites her to Clitheroe Castle for a hunt but she says she has been tempted enough for one day.

On board the Amazon, Samuel accuses Sarah of insulting the memory of his father. James learns that Bullen has skipped ship at Liverpool with the help of Tom and Baines says he is not sorry because he could not make him out as a thief. Bullen returns and demands to know who is accusing him. He was owed several months wages and says that he was told by the old man who owned the estate in Cheshire to take whatever was of use, so he started felling timber. The old mans nephew is a certain Captain Dampier who tells James that as far as he was aware there was an unwritten understanding with Bullen. Dampier reveals that the estate was bankrupt and James orders him to withdraw from his relationship with Sarah giving him cheques from both himself and Elizabeth to fund his steamer. Dampier says he is sorry but that he would really have cared for Sarah.

Marston signs the clay-shipping contract only to find that Bullen is now in mid Atlantic. Marston says that James will never get another contract from him. James says that as far as he is concerned Bullen is innocent and that is his word as gentleman. Marston replies that he sees no gentlemen in the room to which Baines agrees, saying he sees no gentlemen either, and that he is glad he is a simple sailor.

=== (E80) Storm Clouds ===
Written by Simon Masters

Charlotte is on board the Black Pearl reading a book in the heat of Figueira. James tells Baines that she can't just have vanished. Letty looks at a site for her orphanage. Marston asks Elizabeth for a favour to deliver a special case of port from Gibraltar for someone's birthday. She agrees saying he can use the Mersey Maiden. Neighbours tell Letty that they are not happy with her orphanage.

A Mr. Barber callously declares that the best thing any loose woman getting herself pregnant could do is throw the baby in the Mersey. They also approach James saying is there no a financial constraint he can apply. He says he does not take kindly to being told what to do and that anyway it is her own money. The Mersey Maiden is laid up in Figueira awaiting a new prop shaft.

Elizabeth asks James if he can help as a favour but he refuses, to which she replies, 'I hope you never need a favour from me'. Elizabeth tells Marston to trust her that she will have the port back in time for his father's 70th birthday. Elizabeth tells James that she has been told that the Black Pearl is in Figueira and he immediately agrees to sail and pick up the port for Marston. She receives a bunch of red roses from Marston, he telephones her but she leaves a message that she is not at home.

James arrives to find that the Black Pearl has sailed for Madeira. Elizabeth arrives home to find Marston there. He says he worships her and that they are a match; they kiss. James comes across a ship in need of medical help. Marston shows Elizabeth a letter from James asking him to persuade Lord Hawkmoor, who is a friend of his, to sell his property to Letty, otherwise the port may be involved in scenes similar to the Boston Tea Party. The injured crewman develops gangrene so James agrees to turn back to Lisbon. The man tells James that he was drinking with Burgess and he is in fact sailing to the Mediterranean.

James returns home and Letty tells him that she is to buy the house after all and that it is due to Viscount Marston. The episode ends with Samuel drunk in bed with an actress.

=== (E81) Outward Bound ===
Written by Cyril Abraham

A bored Charlotte strums a guitar on board the Black Pearl. Burgess says they are safe in the Mediterranean and that there are only two ways out, the Suez Canal or Gibraltar. Samuel wakes up with a hangover in the house of a Fergus Doyle and his actress daughter Helen who he was with the previous evening. Letty shows James her new orphanage and he offers a paltry donation of 50 guineas. Helen's father is looking for a backer for his new play. Charles Marston declares his love for Elizabeth and says that he wants to marry her, offering to talk to her husband Daniel.

Marston's father visits Elizabeth suggesting that she is not suitable for him, as a divorce would ruin both their names and reputations. James tracks down the Black Pearl in Cyprus. He boards the ship and confronts Burgess offering to trade Charlotte for the Black Pearl. He agrees and a furious Charlotte leaves with James. Mr Doyle gives Sarah a rendition of his new play and floats the idea of 'someone' funding it.

Letty arrives declaring that James has found Charlotte and Samuel and Helen exchange glances. An emotional Charlotte tells James that she is sorry she killed her mother by being born. On the way home, a rope breaks and Charlotte is hit on the head by a pulley block and knocked overboard. She is rescued by Tom and James but has a bad injury and has lost a lot of blood. Samuel says that he won't lose Helen and wants her for his wife. Charlotte is brought home and Samuel starts to speak saying he married her because he was sorry for her. She turns and he sees her scarred face. Letty and James leave and Samuel tells Charlotte they must talk about their future.

=== (E82) Homeward Bound ===
Written by Cyril Abraham

James and Baines tell Tom that he should become indentured as an apprentice to be a ship's master. He says that it will cost £50 plus his uniform, however James and Baines agree to act as surety and waive the fee. James gives him a uniform and Baines gives him a sextant. He is overjoyed. Tom falls asleep on the Black Pearl and Burgess boards it and sets sail with James in pursuit. Tom pretends to join in with them and says it's no skin off his nose which master he serves.

Samuel tells Charlotte he wants a divorce but she begs for forgiveness saying she will never let him go. On board the Black Pearl Tom puts sand in the engine bearings and jumps ship in a skiff that he has filled with provisions.

At home, Dunwoody tells Elizabeth that Daniel has been appointed Turkish Ambassador and as the wife of a Minister Plenipotentiary she will be expected to join him. Sarah schemes to keep Samuel and Charlotte together suggesting that Doyle should take his play, and his daughter, to America and that she will back him for £1500. She says she will be on the quay to wave him bon voyage and hand over the cheque.

James finds Tom who has been at sea for 3 days. He says that he knows exactly where the Black Pearl is. When they find it, Burgess says that they will have to take it over his dead body. His crew refuse to fight with him and James says if he wants the steamer that much 'leave him be' much to Baines' bemusement. Charles Marston's father confronts Elizabeth saying that if she does not end her relationship with his son it is within his gift to revoke Daniels new appointment.

James arrives home with Tom and finds his house full of children from Letty's orphanage, which has burnt down. James says he is going back to the ship for some peace and quiet. Letty says he is so stubborn to which he replies 'always have been, always will be'.

== Series 8 ==
Broadcast 31 August – 26 October 1980, (9 episodes).

=== (E83) A Royal Return ===
Written by Barry Thomas

The final series opens with Elizabeth returning from Constantinople greeted by Dunwoody and helped with her baggage by a stranger. Mrs Gibson tells James that the builder called. We learn that Letty died 3 months ago and that it was her last wish that the house be well maintained. James speaks to Samuel on the phone; he is obviously uncomfortable with the new technology and speaks very loudly. He has had another argument with Charlotte. Elizabeth has borrowed to her limits to fund her new steamer and will not seek help from Daniel. She asks Samuel to lend her £15000. She asks Mrs Gibson how James has been since Letty's death and we learn that she caught diphtheria from one of the children in her orphanage. Charlotte says that the divorce case is soon to go to court and that Samuel will get custody of the children. James walks in the garden with the stranger that Elizabeth met at the station, a Mr Borovec. James enquires after the other passenger and Borovec tells him that he will know him when he boards. James agrees a fee of £3000 for the two passengers. Samuel has put himself up for President of the Chamber of Commerce and is worried about the effect the divorce may have on this. To cut costs James proposes an amalgamation of the Fraser and Onedin lines to Elizabeth and asks her to think about it. Mrs Gibson calls on the phone and Elizabeth answers 'Liverpool 5'. She tells James that a visitor has called for him at his house. Sir Gerald from the Foreign Office tells James that Prince Alexander of Bulgaria has been forced to abdicate by the Tsar of Russia who wants to appoint a puppet to do his bidding and that the mysterious passenger will be Prince Alexander. On board the Soren Larsson, Elizabeth tells James that she saw Borovec in the Russian Embassy in Constantinople talking to the Tsar and fears that the Prince's life may be in danger. Two of the seamen discuss being bribed £50 each and £50 when 'the job' is done. The Prince narrowly escapes being killed by a block and tackle thrown by a man in the rigging and dives in after him after he falls, rescuing him. Later in remorse the seaman confesses to Baines. At home, the Liverpool Echo carries the headline 'Prominent Liverpool businessman in divorce case'. Charlotte does not fight the case offering no defence and they are divorced. James arrives in Bulgaria and the party row ashore to a riverbank. Several horsemen arrive taking Tom hostage. Borovec disguises himself as Prince Alexander and is shot and killed. Tom is freed and the attackers leave presuming the Prince to be dead. He bids James goodbye and sets off inland alone.

=== (E84) Revenge ===
Written by Simon Masters

James decides that instead of leaving Bulgaria he will stay and pick up a cargo of tobacco. He has heard that the Danube is flooded so it cannot go by the usual route. He and Baines set off inland to pick up the tobacco on the backs of donkeys. Tom and another crewman wait on the dock. They see a group of men take over the ship as it lies waiting. Tom decides to go after James and Baines. Meanwhile, James picks up the tobacco and sets off back for the ship. They find the track is blocked and suddenly they are attacked. They are both knocked out and when they come to they find themselves prisoners in a castle. They are then told that they are being held hostage. James finds out that the whole thing with the tobacco was a trick just to get him inland. Elizabeth is at home and receives a visit from a government official who tells her that the brigands want £50,000 for James' release. He says the government cannot help so it is up to the family to raise the money. Elizabeth sells some of her shares in the Frazer line. Samuel lends her £10,000 and Charlotte sells some of the Onedin Line ships. Elizabeth and Samuel set off for Bulgaria with the ransom.

Meanwhile, James digs a hole in the fireplace. Tom arrives at the castle and can hear the noise of him digging. When James breaks through, he sees Tom in the chimney. They escape and set off for the coast, regaining the ship. Elizabeth and Samuel meet up with the brigands and hand over the ransom. They go back to the steamer and sail for the cove where, they have been told, James will be waiting. The two ships meet and Elizabeth boards the Onedin ship. When James finds out that they paid the ransom, he is furious, shouting "you nincompoops even I would not have paid £50,000 for me!"

=== (E85) Blood Ties ===
Written by Nick McCarty

James takes a woman passenger on board, Margarita Juarez, the President's daughter, Tom gives her a whistle. What may be an old Morgan Cannon (named after Sir Henry Morgan) is brought on board. Margarita learns from Tom that James' wife is dead. She tells James not to feel guilty at his loss- he says 'I'm 47 years old, have a difficult daughter and go home to a cold house, not much at my age'. He tells her that he has built and almost lost an empire but regrets that he never allowed Letty to share it with him. Margarita and James are obviously becoming attracted to each other. Gavrialides warns James not to unload his cargo, as there is no money to pay for it. James visits the President who tells him that he may soon be overthrown and to take his daughter away with him. James and Tom smuggle Margarita out from under the rebels nose but are too late to get to the ship before Baines sets sail. They escape into a small rowing boat but are fired on by the rebels. Baines orders the mate Turner to try firing the Morgans cannon. They succeed in knocking out the rebels' stronghold but Turner is killed in the blast. James asks Margarita what she wants to do to which she replies, 'you decide'. James says 'we'll go home then'.

=== (E86) The Honeymoon ===
Written by Barry Thomas

James and Margarita have married, but Elizabeth is not happy. James has decided to go the East Indies to find cargo to solve their financial problems. The main problem is that the Dutch have a monopoly there. He plans to go to Sumatra and asks Margarita to go with him as a honeymoon. He leaves Elizabeth to buy two old ships to store tobacco in the East Indies and to start a new company and raise £20,000 to do so. She asks Samuel but he refuses saying that he has no money as his mills are on strike. At the dock, Captain Baines is signing on crew and turns away a union man. Margarita tells James that this will deprive his family so James tells Baines to hire him. He also engages a bosun that everyone hates, they say that every voyage he does someone dies. He is a brutal man. They arrive in Sumatra and meet Max Van De Rheede a shipping owner living there. He is very charming to Margarita.

James meets Max's customers and undercuts his prices. They also meet Max's brother Theodore. James sets sail to Java to get custom there but Max believes that he won't succeed because the Dutch have all the business. Later Max tells his brother that James has ruined them and they will have to leave Sumatra. Meanwhile, at home Elizabeth tells Mr Dawkins and Mr Dunwoody that the company James has created is called Rotterdam Onedin and has 40% Dutch shareholders, this has enabled him to trade in The East Indies. When they arrive home, Elizabeth greets them and says she has a surprise dinner guest. It turns out to be Max. He tells them all that his brother killed himself because they had to leave and that he is starting a company in Liverpool.

=== (E87) Jonah's Luck ===
Written by Roger Parkes

Elizabeth and Dunwoody attend an auction of some of their ships and bid for the Sea Spray. They are outbid by Captain Baines, aided financially by Tom who offers his life savings of £45. Elizabeth had thought he was bidding for it on behalf of James who says he would have gone there himself if he had known. James tells Margarita that he is going to Niger alone to set up a trading post, she replies seductively, 'say goodbye properly'! In return for his investment Baines gives Tom six shares in the Sea Spray; they are now partners. James wants to sail immediately but it's Friday and Baines says to wait until tomorrow, James declares 'Jonah's Luck'. Samuel and Max Van Der Rheede discuss the sale of a warehouse on the East River in New York. Der Rheede wants £11000 for it; Samuel agrees but pays for it by giving him the note he holds against James' debt. In Niger, James goes up river to meet Reverend Stoner and the chief and bargain for ivory. At home, Margarita wanders the streets of Liverpool and is attacked and robbed. She comments on the pitiful conditions some of the people live in and Elizabeth says she should take over running the orphanage following Letty's death to which Margarita replies, 'Letty, Letty, Letty!' James offers to build the trading post in return for all their ivory and accepts a drinking challenge with the evil Nkasa who says that Baines will be ill, Tom will die in a fire and James' wife will be ill. The potions strength is first tested on a goat, which dies. James goes first but secretly makes himself sick and survives. Nkasa refuses to drink and James wins. Baines is unhappy with James' double-dealing with Reverend Stoner and Samuel. James confronts Baines for buying the Sea Spray for himself. Baines declares he wants nothing more to do with him saying 'you can walk your own path to hell James Onedin'.

=== (E88) The Price of Pride ===
Written by Roger Parkes

Back in Liverpool, Tom tells Baines it's not too late to settle his argument with James, but Baines says that he has had the whole voyage home to make amends. James says it has been a long time, maybe too long says Baines, they shake hands. James finds Margarita in bed ailing from a fever and chest infection from Liverpool's cold air but getting better. James shows an interest in a three-masted barque the Angelos, to transport a cargo of ivory. He tells Dawkins that Baines is no longer with the Onedin Line. Dawkins suggests that he take the Soren Larsson with James himself as captain. Baines receives his final pay from Dawkins including the profit from his shares in the Christian Radich and Dawkins tips him off about a possible whiskey charter. Tom tells James that he is a partner with Baines and is going on the Sea Spray's first run. James is furious and tells him that he is in breach of his indentures and will send him on a coaling run to Swansea until he learns obedience. Tom lies to Baines and sets sail with him on the Sea Spray. Max Van Der Rheede calls on James for the repayment of his £10000 debt, sold to him by Samuel, plus £500 interest. On the way to the launch of the new Fraser ship, the William Fraser, Dunwoody lets slip that he has seen Dawkins dining with Van Der Rheede and that he is the source of the indiscretions. Tom tells Baines that he has lied to him and Baines is furious telling him that James 'owns him body and soul'. James confronts Dawkins who says that Van Der Rheede told him he only wanted to help but James dismisses him anyway. Elizabeth receives a letter from Samuel saying he is returning from abroad and that he has remarried. James repays his debt to Van Der Rheede who says he will use it to buy the Angelos. He tells James that because of his blind greed, he ruined his brother who then committed suicide and that he made a graveside vow to beggar him. James wonders why Charlotte has not responded to his or Margarita's letters. They learn that she has been away on tour singing in Music Hall. She is booked to open at The Pantheon in Liverpool performing under the name The Lancashire Nightingale. Samuel arrives with his new American bride Caroline. Her father is President of the New York Yankees Baseball team as well as a Long Island bank. Charlotte arrives and greets Caroline, mistaking her for James' wife Margarita. Samuel is furious and says 'thank you Charlotte, thank you'. In the hold of the Sea Spray a rat jumps out at the bosun causing him to drop his lamp, setting fire to the cargo of whisky. Tom tries to put out the fire but is badly burnt, Baines rescues him and they escape in the lifeboat before the ship explodes. Tragically, Tom dies from his injuries in Baines' arms.

=== (E89) Vengeance ===
Written by Barry Thomas

Back in Liverpool, Tom Arnold is buried. Baines says 'I wanted to bury you at sea but it was not possible, you just rest nice and easy now, we'll get you a proper headstone as soon as I can afford it. I'm off to Liverpool to settle matters with James Onedin'. Jack Pearson calls on Margarita pursuing a debt of £2000 owing for 5 months. Max Van Der Rheede calls at the office and learns that Dawkins has been sacked. Baines calls on James but he is out. He tells Margarita that if James had treated Tom right, he wouldn't have run off and been killed. 'It will all catch up with him' he says. He says he doesn't blame her but will never forgive James, never. Elizabeth reveals that the Queen has written a personal letter of thanks to James for rescuing the Prince of Bulgaria and that she may reward him. Van Der Rheede 'borrows' a necklace from a prostitute called Bettsie given to her by a gentleman from London. He tells Baines that he has settled the refitting debts of the Sea Spray and implies that the debt can be repaid in some other way. On board James' ship, two police officers come on board and demand to search the cabin. Samuel rings Elizabeth to say that James has been arrested for receiving stolen property; they found the necklace on the ship. If convicted he could receive up to 14 years penal servitude. Samuel tells Elizabeth he understands that Der Rheede paid off Baines' debt. Der Rheede calls on Margarita and says is there anything he can do, insinuating that James succumbed to temptation. Samuel finds Baines and tells him James has been arrested. Baines says he suspected something was wrong as Der Rheede was being far too generous and wanted him to do something wrong in return. He says that it must have been Pendleton the cook and to look no further as he is the finest cook on the Seven Seas and the shiftiest. Der Rheede discusses the permanent removal of Bettsie for £50 to solve the problem of the missing necklace, which was in her possession. He has her sold abroad never to see Liverpool again. James is committed for trial and Der Rheede calls on Margarita to commiserate. Elizabeth tells him 'you are the vilest man I have ever known'. She tells Margarita that the worst thing that could ever befall James would be imprisonment. The episode closes with James contemplating his fate in his prison cell.

=== (E90) Guilty – In All Innocence ===
Written by Simon Masters

A reward of 50 guineas is offered for Pembleton's whereabouts. Samuel says Baines could not have done it. Baines' landlady asks for his overdue rent, giving him one more week to pay. Margarita says she wants to see James, she says she was imprisoned for 8 months when she was 17 years old and had to eat the lizards and spiders that crawled over her. Charlotte calls on James. She has decided to leave the theatre. James asks her to look over his ships and give a full current appraisal. She talks to Dunwoody and Baines arrives saying he knows where Pendleton is, accepting the reward money. He has sailed for Rochelle. Margarita says she will take the fastest ship and confront him with Samuel going with her. Elizabeth receives a letter from Daniel. He has been away on a path of enlightenment studying Sufism as taught by Rumi. He is considering resigning his Ambassadorship and his seat in Parliament. It has made him realise how much he still loves Elizabeth and if she will still have him. Margarita and Samuel search for Pembleton's ship. Max van Der Rheede calls on Dunwoody and offers to buy six of their ships for £500 each. Dunwoody says you may have duped Dawkins but not me. They find Pembleton adrift after his ship is lost in the storm, but he is dead. At home, a seaman delivers a letter to Margarita from Bettsie. She was sold to a white slaver and on the ship she heard about the necklace and what Der Rheede wanted it for. She wants to see him pay for what he did to her. Samuel tells Baines to go and see James and tell him that they caught up with Pembleton. James says 'I wondered how long it would take you'. They reconcile their differences. Baines says he remembers telling Der Rheede that he was taking some charts back to the ship and that the necklace was found in one of them. Margarita visits James and offers him a gun to break out. He says he will walk out legally. At his lodgings, Baines confronts Mr. Sparrow and demands a signed confession that Der Rheede paid him to plant the necklace. Elizabeth and Samuel confront Der Rheede showing him the statements from Sparrow and Bettsie. Samuel says if he signs a confession, they will give him two days before they notify the authorities. He agrees. The family, including Baines, celebrate James' release on bail. James is angry when he learns of the deal with Der Rheede and sets off after him together with Baines and Elizabeth. They eventually catch up with his ship and persuade the captain to give him up. Der Rheede jumps overboard to try to swim into Dutch waters, James says 'lower a boat'.

=== (E91) A Long Way Home ===
Written by Mervyn Haisman

Max Van Der Rheede is imprisoned and James is a free man. Samuel discusses his supply of nitrate with James and agrees a price of £25000, payable in 6 months. Baines is told to prepare the Soren Larsson for a long trip, James reveals he is going to South America for 10–12 months. Margarita says she will go as well but James says no as they will be rounding The Horn twice and she would be an encumbrance. James tells Elizabeth he wants to sell 18 small ships to fund a few bigger ones. He has bought half a million tons of Nitrate from Samuel and he will sail out with coal and back with nitrate. James needs a further £25000 to finance his operation and Elizabeth agrees to the loan, again spread over 6 months. He says he will have 20 years to sell it at a profit of £2 million. James and Baines set sail and discover that Margarita has stowed away. Samuel has received his official nomination for parliament after being recommended by Daniel. Elizabeth asks if it is Caroline's idea for him to go into politics. Samuel asks Charlotte to dinner to discuss their children; 'we've both changed' he says. Baines says that James has made a mistake as the river is silted up and that the nearest they can get to the nitrate is by rowing boat. James reveals that he has brought timber with them to build a jetty. James turns down Alf Scrutton's offer to load the nitrate and is threatened by him, saying he will destroy the jetty if it is built. Margarita tells James she is five months pregnant. He says she will have it in Buenos Aires. Margarita bargains with the locals to build his jetty in return for ten boats. We learn that the Charlotte Rhodes, James' first ship, has been sold as part of the liquidation of Onedin ships. Samuel has lost the election and Elizabeth receives a telegram saying that Daniel is missing at sea, presumed drowned. She is widowed for the second time. On board ship, James wakes with a premonition about her. James placates Scrutton by offering him a job for £10 a month to organise the loading of the nitrate, paid 6 months in advance. They set sail with the first load of nitrate and Margarita goes into labour. James tells Baines that he will give him all the help that he needs. A bemused Baines says he has never delivered a baby, 'neither have I' says James. Simon the cook confides that he has delivered three and successfully delivers Margarita's baby. An overjoyed James thanks him and shakes his hand. It is a boy, named Will after captain Baines. On deck James takes the wheel declaring, 'I've got a son'.
