= Ennal's Point =

1977 novel by Alun Richards

- First edition (publ. Michael Joseph)
- Author: Alun Richards
- Language: English
- Publisher: Michael Joseph
- Publication date: 1977
- ISBN: 0-7181-1507-4 (first edition)
- Dewey Decimal: 823.914
- LC Class: PR6068.I244 E5

Ennal's Point is a novel by Alun Richards, first published in 1977.

The story concerns the crew of a south Wales lifeboat, loosely modelled on the Swansea-based Mumbles lifeboat.

In 1982, the novel was adapted by BBC Wales for the BBC2 network and starred Philip Madoc as lifeboat coxswain Jack Tustin, with a crew that included Glyn Owen and David Lyn. Veteran actress Rachel Thomas also appeared in the series, which used an instrumental segment of Hazel O'Connor's hit, "Will You?", as its theme.
