= Alun Richards =

Welsh novelist (1929–2004)

Alun Morgun Richards (27 October 1929 – 2 June 2004) was a Welsh novelist, best known for his novel Ennal's Point, about the work of a lifeboat crew in South Wales.

Richards was born in King Edward Avenue, Caerphilly. He was educated at Pontypridd Grammar School and the University College of Wales. After training to be a teacher Richards joined the Royal Navy which sparked a fascination with the sea that inspired much of his writing.

In 1955, he returned to Wales from London but became ill with tuberculosis and was admitted to the sanatorium at Talgarth. After two years he was released and married Helen Howden, a probation officer, with whom he had three sons and a daughter.

He taught English for 10 years and settled in Mumbles, Swansea, which provided the backdrop for much of his writing.

As well as novels and short stories, he wrote extensively for theatre and television, including several episodes of The Onedin Line.

A connoisseur of rugby union, Richards published A Touch of Glory to mark the centenary of the Welsh Rugby Union in 1980 and a memoir of Carwyn James in 1984.

In 1985, Richard was awarded an Honorary Fellowship by the University College of Swansea.

He died in Singleton Hospital, Swansea, on 2 June 2004, aged 74, after a heart attack.

== Other works ==
- Dai Country (1974) (short stories)
- The Former Miss Merthyr Tydfil (short stories)
- Days of Absence (1986)
- Barque Whisper (1979)
- The Elephant You Gave Me (1963). Michael Joseph
- The Home Patch (1966). Michael Joseph
