= Gerald Blake (director) =

British television director (1928–1991)

- Born: Gerald Maurice Shorts; 3 December 1928; Hackney, London, England
- Died: 5 April 1991 (aged 62); Camden, London, England
- Occupation: Television director

Gerald Blake (3 December 1928 – 5 April 1991) was a British television director who worked in drama from the 1960s to the 1980s.

== Early life ==
Blake's formative years were spent in the front seats of cinemas. An avid movie fan, he would recreate films by painstakingly drawing frame by frame on rolls of bus tickets, which would be fed through a slit in a cocoa tin. Come the Second World War, the boy found himself bombed out three times and evacuated from the East End of London to Wales.

== Career ==
Beginning his career as an actor, Blake appeared in repertory, appearing in productions at Burnham and Farnham before becoming stage director at the New Shakespeare Theatre, Liverpool. In October 1958, he became associate producer at the Theatre Royal, Lincoln. It was here during the presentation of a revue that BBC producer Norman Rutherford was visiting. Impressed by the production, he offered Blake a six-month drama producer's course with the corporation. Starting on 8 May 1962, his training consisted of directing episodes of Dr. Finlay's Casebook and afterwards went on to become a television director.

His numerous credits include The Gentle Touch, The Omega Factor (the episode "After-Image"), Blake's 7 (the episodes "The Harvest of Kairos" (1980) and "Death-Watch" (1980) from the third series), Survivors (three episodes from the first series), The Onedin Line, Out of the Unknown, Doctor Who (the stories The Abominable Snowmen (1967) and The Invasion of Time (1978)), Super Gran, Compact, Z-Cars, Mr. Palfrey of Westminster, and Coronation Street.

== Personal life ==
In 1956, Blake married the actress Sally Wyndham Davies. Whilst together in Lincoln, they had a son, Adam James in 1960. By 1978, their marriage was in trouble and agreed on a trial separation. Within three weeks though, Blake had moved as a lodger into the home of friend Jill Gascoine's (having known each other since working together on an episode of Softly, Softly: Task Force) place as a lodger. Subsequently, he left his wife and children for Gascoine but the divorce did not come through until May 1983. Not long afterwards, Blake and Gascoine parted amicably after she had fallen for a younger man, actor Alfred Molina.
