= The Bill series 3 =

The Bill
- Series 3
- Series 3 Australian DVD cover
- No. of episodes: 12

Release
- Original network: ITV
- Original release: 21 September – 7 December 1987

Series chronology
- ← Previous; Series 2 Next → Series 4

The third series of The Bill, a British television drama, consists of twelve episodes, broadcast between 21 September and 7 December 1987.

Many of the cast and crew shared their memories of making the first three series for Oliver Crocker's 2020 book Witness Statements: Making The Bill (Series 1–3), published by Chinbeard Books and Spiteful Puppet, including stars John Salthouse, Eric Richard, Trudie Goodwin, Mark Wingett, Peter Ellis, Nula Conwell, Jon Iles, Larry Dann, Colin Blumenau, Robert Hudson, Mark Powley, Sonesh Sira and Graham Cole; along with writers Barry Appleton, Lionel Goldstein, Edwin Pearce and Christopher Russell, producer Peter Cregeen and director Michael Ferguson. Reviewing the book for We Are Cult, Si Hart noted that it contained Salthouse's first interview about his time on the show, and that Cregeen, who took over from Michael Chapman, decided that the series would not show criminals planning their crimes and would have no scenes without a police officer in shot.

== DVD releases ==
The series was first released on DVD as part of a three-season box set on 10 May 2006 in Australia. It was later made available as a separate season in the United Kingdom on 28 May 2007 and in Australia on 3 August 2011. The above DVD artwork is taken from the most recent Australian release. It features an image of Ch Supt Charles Brownlow. The British artwork features a collage image featuring DI Roy Galloway, PCs Nick Shaw and Viv Martella, and DC Mike Dashwood. The image right is the Australian three-season DVD box set features a sole image of chief superintendent Charles Brownlow.

== Cast changes ==
=== Arrivals ===
- Inspector Brian Kite
- PC Danesh Patel
- PC Ken Melvin

=== Departures ===
- PC Nick Shaw
- PC Danesh Patel
- Inspector Brian Kite
- DI Roy Galloway

== Episodes ==
| No. overall | No. in series | Title | Directed by | Written by | Original release date |
|---|---|---|---|---|---|
| 24 | 1 | "The New Order of Things" | Michael Ferguson | Geoff McQueen | 21 September 1987 |
Sgts Peters and Penny apprehend a man standing outside the station waiting to attack PC Muswell, who had left the force six months previously. PC Jim Carver begins his CID training by working on an all-night obbo with DS Ted Roach. Owing to Carver's inexperience and Roach's lax attitude, they both miss a flatbed trailer stealing a digger from a building site. Roach and Carver follow up their suspicions about the site security guard, and find he has stolen the equipment. Back at Sun Hill, DI Roy Galloway is being investigated by the Home Office for allegedly forcing a confession from a murder suspect under duress. Galloway is cleared of wrongdoing owing to lack of evidence, but Ch Supt Brownlow warns him that his old-school policing methods may be his undoing. In a surprising turn of events, one of PC Reg Hollis's rare walks on the beat with WPC June Ackland leads to him apprehending an armed man single-handedly from the Sun Hill DHSS office. WPC Martella manages to talk down a woman threatening to throw herself off a block of flats as she has just discovered she has AIDS. However, the woman later commits suicide at the hospital after a visit from Martella. Guest starring: Tom Price, Robert Duncan and Bruce Purchase
| 25 | 2 | "Some You Win, Some You Lose" | Peter Cregeen | Barry Appleton | 28 September 1987 |
Ch Supt Brownlow and DI Galloway lead a massive raid on a drug den on a local council estate which escalates into a full-blown riot, but half a million pounds worth of crack cocaine is recovered. PC Melvin loses a handcuffed prisoner in the confusion, but he is arrested by PC Hollis when he turns up at the station asking for his handcuffs to be removed. The operation is down to DC Dashwood, whose snout is feeding them information on the main drug dealer. Meeting with the snout to get the location of the main drug lab, Dashwood is alarmed when PC Carver recognises his informant as Dougie Gardiner. CID raid the location given to Dashwood by Gardiner, but find nothing except a student squat. Desperate to arrest the dealer, and furious with Dashwood for lying about his snout, Galloway stakes out the dealer's Range Rover in a car park, despite Brownlow insisting he end the operation. When a borough councillor complains to Insp Kite about the estate raid, it is discovered that the squat has a hidden basement. Galloway and his team race back there only to discover they have been beaten to it by the Drugs Squad from the Yard. Sun Hill holds a public viewing for recovered stolen property, but a gold snuff box is re-stolen before the owner arrives to claim it. Guest starring: Graham Cole, David Quilter, Benny Young, Hilda Braid, Doreen Ingleton and Johnnie Wade
| 26 | 3 | "Brownie Points" | Mary McMurray | Christopher Russell | 5 October 1987 |
PC Reg Hollis has been nominated for the position of the station's Police Federation Representative. He's sure he's a shoo-in, but PC Nick Shaw tells him that WPC June Ackland has also applied. A DAC visits Sun Hill at the same time as a brownie pack. The "Tom Squad" is out in force, cracking down on prostitution in Sun Hill. Shaw and PC Taffy Edwards are unable to process the ladies they have arrested, and sit with them in the van until the DAC has left the building. PC Jim Carver goes to warn a prostitute, Shirley, about the crackdown, as she is a snout for DI Galloway, but he is stopped by Edwards and Shaw who tease him about kerb-crawling. DS Ted Roach and PC Yorkie Smith go to a case conference with social workers when it is suspected a young girl is being assaulted by her mother. Roach doesn't seem interested as he thinks social workers are useless, but once the meeting is over, Roach organises a raid to take the little girl into protective custody. Guest starring: Jonathan Newth, Harry Fielder, Ulric Browne and Lorraine Ashbourne
| 27 | 4 | "Missing, Presumed Dead" | Michael Ferguson | Barry Appleton | 12 October 1987 |
There's been a shooting, but none of the neighbours seem to have witnessed anything. While chasing a possible suspect, Sgt Bob Cryer hits and kills a pedestrian. During door to door inquiries PC Yorkie Smith discovers a man with exotic animals including snakes, owls and a crocodile in his bathtub. DS Roach is attacked by some thugs, and the next day tries to beat them with an iron bar until PC Carver stops him. His attackers are later kneecapped as a message to DI Galloway as to who really is the law on the manor. Guest starring: Dafydd Hywel, Berwick Kaler, Andrew Paul, Lois Baxter, Geoffrey Hutchings, Eric Mason, John Blundell, Marlene Sidaway and Jacqui Dankworth
| 28 | 5 | "Domestics" | Peter Cregeen | Edwin Pearce | 19 October 1987 |
Residents take action against a women's refuge in their area, while PC Yorkie Smith gives advice to the husband of a woman at the refuge. As DI Galloway gets tough with his detectives about the clear up rates of burglaries in the area, WPC Martella and PC Edwards pull in a man suspected of three burglaries. PC Edwards is getting a hard time because of his impending marriage. Guest starring: Philomena McDonagh, Leon Herbert, Eliza Hunt, Michael Bilton and Cheryl Hall
| 29 | 6 | "What Are Little Boys Made Of?" | Peter Duguid | Christopher Russell | 26 October 1987 |
A boy causes a bus accident by throwing a milk bottle at it. He has six siblings. PC Frank marks bikes for children. A bike with the wrong postcode is stolen. Shaw has a car accident and some booze in the car gets broken and then Ackland drops another box. An old lady, conned out of five pounds, turns out to be one of a number of elderly people targeted by a group of children. Guest starring: Peter Sproule, Alison King, Constance Chapman, Ken Bones, Charles Lamb and Len Lowe
| 30 | 7 | "Blind Alleys, Clogged Roads" | Graham Theakston | Lionel Goldenstein | 2 November 1987 |
PC Jim Carver is sent to the morgue to investigate a suspicious drowning. The victim has clearly been planted with several items such as theatre tickets, badly-fitting clothes and an odd suicide note. DS Roach has a theory it's an assassination by the British secret service; meanwhile he's trying to get permission to conduct an obbo from an office building. DI Roy Galloway and DC Mike Dashwood are reprimanded by a judge for not bringing all their evidence in a fraud case to the court. They race back to Sun Hill in the recess to retrieve the documents, but on the way back, Galloway runs into a black cab. An argument ensues, and Galloway nicks the cabbie for breach of the peace. Half the cabbies in London blockade the station in protest. PC Nick Shaw is slashed with a knife when breaking up a fight between two brothers-in-law, but Sgt Penny refuses to charge the suspect. An Asian man arrives at the station to report continued harassment, and a young boy is brought in for graffitiing a Rolls-Royce. WPCs Ackland and Martella wind up PC Reg Hollis and convince him to pay for the renovation of the station rec room by telling him they need creche facilities in the station. Carver nicks a mugger who attacked Martella at a tube station. Roach's theory could be correct when a Special Branch officer turns up and tells Galloway to drop the drowning case. Guest starring: Ann Emery
| 31 | 8 | "Double Trouble" | Michael Ferguson | Barry Appleton | 9 November 1987 |
DI Galloway wants eight men for an identity parade after an attack on a woman. They run into a mob of football supporters who are "persuaded" to help them out. PC Melvin helps a lady who has locked herself out of her car. CIB arrive at the station and none of the early shift are allowed to leave. It turns out to be an allegation of a copper pocketing a parking fine. Nerves are frayed on the relief, particularly those of PC Nick Shaw and WPC June Ackland who come under particular scrutiny as they were on patrol at the time. Shaw is in strife for not declaring Ackland as a passenger in his panda car. As Ackland and Shaw are interviewed, another report of the bent coppers comes in, and CID arrest a mechanic from the police garage and his girlfriend who were posing as police officers and pocketing on-the-spot fines. PC Stamp spills a cup of coffee on the PC Patel's computer keyboard causing Patel to lose all the work he has done. Guest starring: Graham Cole, Julian Holloway, Chris Tranchell, Veronica Roberts and Jeillo Edwards
| 32 | 9 | "Sun Hill Karma" | Mary McMurray | Christopher Russell | 16 November 1987 |
Martella applies for a position in the Bermuda police force, but after being punched during a fight, and failing to prevent a suicide jumper, she feels she is not up to the job and withdraws her application. Roach investigates a fight at a hostel for drunks. Patel investigates another racial attack. During follow-up, Carver is worried about himself not liking Asians. Penny has started yoga and thinks everyone else should do it too. Guest starring: Paddy Joyce, David Auker, Joan Rhodes, Nora Connolly, Val McLane and June Page
| 33 | 10 | "Skipper" | Richard Bramall | Christopher Russell | 23 November 1987 |
WPC June Ackland's father is dying in hospital. PC Taffy Edwards is given traffic duty after arriving late for parade. PC Jim Carver gets beaten up in a bus queue. Sgt Cryer and PC Patel investigate an alleged rape. Insp Kite is set up and sent to collect mud samples because of a supposed leak of toxic waste into the River Thames. Guest starring: Jenny Jay
| 34 | 11 | "Overnight Stay" | Graham Theakston | Barry Appleton | 30 November 1987 |
Half the relief, including CID, are at a hotel guarding a sequestered jury in a gangland murder trial. There are several attempts to spook the jury over the course of the night. DS Roach and WPC Martella clash when she catches him chatting up a female juror and he accuses her of falling asleep on the job. PC Carver and DC Dashwood end up in the swimming pool after chasing a woman who was acting suspiciously in the car park through the hotel. She is arrested but refuses to speak, and a major from the Bomb Squad is called in when her bag is found, but it contains a severed hand. Distraught at the death of her father, WPC Ackland gets drunk in the hotel bar. She is found by Sgts Cryer and Penny, and put in the sauna to sober up. When she recovers, Ackland spots a suspicious man checking into the hotel. DI Galloway leads a raid on the man's room, and breaks up an IRA cell conducting an arms deal. Back at Sun Hill, Insp Kite deals with a serial nuisance confessing to bigamy, and PC Shaw brings in a man with a blow-up doll. Guest starring: Richard Durden, Patricia Lawrence, Elizabeth Carling, Tony Slattery, Arthur Whybrow and Campbell Morrison
| 35 | 12 | "Not Without Cause" | Peter Cregeen | Barry Appleton | 7 December 1987 |
Sgt Penny is asked by a landlord to talk to a lady on the top floor who is keeping cats. He is shot through the door after finding out his radio doesn't work. When Penny doesn't respond to radio calls, the station is worried about him and organises a search party. The landlord turns up at the station and talks to DI Galloway who doesn't make the connection. Insp Kite nicks four people for breach of peace that he caused. A suspected poisoning of chocolate bars is traced to a supermarket. Guest starring: Richard Cordery, Henry Goodman, Caroline Lee-Johnson, Denyse Alexander, Patrick Godfrey, Amanda Walker and Jonathan Hackett
