= The Bill series 2 =

Season of television series

The Bill
- Series 2
- No. of episodes: 12

Release
- Original network: ITV
- Original release: 11 November 1985 – 10 February 1986

Series chronology
- ← Previous; Series 1 Next → Series 3

The second series of The Bill, a British television drama, consists of twelve episodes, broadcast between 11 November 1985 and 10 February 1986.

Many of the cast and crew shared their memories of making this second series for the book Witness Statements, including stars John Salthouse, Eric Richard, Trudie Goodwin, Mark Wingett, Peter Ellis, Nula Conwell, Jon Iles, Larry Dann, Colin Blumenau, Robert Hudson, Ashley Gunstock and Ralph Brown; along with writers Barry Appleton, Lionel Goldstein, Ginnie Hole and Christopher Russell, producer Peter Cregeen and directors Michael Ferguson and John Woods.

== Cast changes ==
=== Arrivals ===
- PC Abe Lyttleton
- PC Pete Muswell
- PC Nick Shaw

=== Departures ===
- PC Abe Lyttleton
- PC Dave Litten
- PC Pete Muswell

== Episodes ==
No. overall	No. in series	Title	Directed by	Written by	Original release date
12	1	"Snouts and Red Herrings"	Peter Cregeen	Geoff McQueen	11 November 1985
Amidst renovation chaos at Sun Hill a new PC, Abe Lyttleton, arrives a day early. He is Sun Hill's first black police officer and although he is friendly and popular, his arrival is not appreciated by bigoted PC Pete Muswell. DC Dashwood recognises a man who has brought in his papers for a car. He is using a false name and address. During electrical repairs the personal radios are out of action and as a result a CID operation is blown.
13	2	"Suspects"	Michael Ferguson	Barry Appleton	18 November 1985
Martella arrests a woman who has been "pregnant" for 13 months, concealing stolen cigarettes in the bulge. A wage snatch, a culprit and Galloway's nose are the three main ingredients used to crack a serious mystery, and the result surprises everyone. Meanwhile, new PC Nick Shaw arrives for duty at Sun Hill and soon makes an impression on the rest of the relief.
14	3	"Lost"	Christopher Hodson	Ginnie Hole	25 November 1985
DS Roach and DC Dashwood are on "obbo" (observation) at a phone box to catch someone making hoax bomb threats to the Town Hall. Another case soon takes precedence, however, when a woman arrives at the station and reports her eight-year-old daughter Samantha missing. When Samantha's friend Theresa tells WPC Ackland that they were approached by a flasher there is concern that the girl could have been abducted by a sex offender. CID question suspects in the area while a full-scale search is under way. Ackland notices that Samantha likes boats, so the search is concentrated in the docks area, and a drunken boat owner gives a description of a woman he saw with the girl. With Roach and Dashwood halfway to Brighton to question a paedophile, a call comes in to PC Carver in the incident room from a shop assistant who recognised Samantha and the woman who bought her some colouring books. Finding the woman's identity from credit card slips, DI Galloway and WPC Ackland find Samantha safe and well in the house of a lonely widow. Ackland is horrified, however, when she returns the child to her parents and the mother slaps her daughter, screaming "Where have you been, you stupid bitch?".
15	4	"Home Beat"	John Michael Phillips	Christopher Russell	2 December 1985
Brownlow wants to start a Neighbourhood Watch scheme with the support of Smith and Carver. After a heated meeting that gets hijacked by interlopers he discovers that his petrol has been stolen. The Ahmeds are having problems as racist language has been graffitied upon their house, soon after a protest erupts and their house is later firebombed. CID raid a modern Fagin who has been using a youth group as cover.
16	5	"Hostage"	Michael Ferguson	Barry Appleton	9 December 1985
Sgt Cryer is taking half the relief out on Sun Hill's annual fishing trip. PC Smith and DC Dashwood go to serve a warrant on Russell Archer over a non-appearance in court on a poaching charge. Archer manages to escape from Dashwood and Smith, and is later seen menacing a milkman with a sawn-off shotgun. He later holds up a bookie's and a greengrocer's, but is spotted by PCs Carver and Frank, who give chase. Frank is shot and wounded, and Archer ends up taking an elderly woman hostage in a retirement village. With the fishing trip cancelled, DS Roach takes charge of the siege operation until DI Galloway and Ch Supt Brownlow arrive. Attempts to contact the increasingly unstable Archer fail until he asks to speak to Sgt Cryer, whom he saw in the betting shop. Cryer enters the flat and attempts to talk Archer into giving himself up. With WPC Ackland posing as a Meals on Wheels driver, Galloway, Roach and PT17 officers storm the flat, and Archer is shot dead just as he is about to surrender.
17	6	"This Little Pig"	John Woods	Christopher Russell	23 December 1985
PC Edwards corners a pig that was released from the City Farm and gets dropped in it by PC Muswell. Muswell has problems with income tax on wages from the miners' strike. PC Hollis makes initial inquiries about the Chief Super's clerk's job. Both DI Galloway and Sgt Cryer have problems with an overtime clamp-down and get another lecture from Brownlow about it. Fur protesters are arrested outside a fur shop. Edwards, WPC June Ackland and Muswell arrest a man on his wedding day for non-appearance in court.
18	7	"Ringer"	John Woods	Barry Appleton	6 January 1986
There is a serious road crash involving a Porsche, a motorcycle, a coach, a lorry and a Cortina resulting in six deaths. The Porsche had been tampered with prior to the accident and turns out to have been made of three different cars. Brownlow sets up a temporary morgue at a local school; WPC Martella and PC Muswell have the job of informing relatives of the deaths. After following the trail from the Porsche DI Galloway raids a scrapyard, only to find DS Burnside from the robbery squad under cover as a buyer, about to break the ring, but having forgotten to tell Galloway.
19	8	"Public and Confidential"	Christopher Hodson	Lionel Goldstein	13 January 1986
A man is throwing tiles off a roof and PC Lyttleton, who has vertigo, is sent up to arrest him. A Polish sailor turns up at the station seeking political asylum. DS Roach and DC Dashwood catch a man who has been posing as a gas board official. Ch Supt Brownlow talks to PC Edwards about taking a position in the coroner's office. Sgt Cryer is shocked when Mrs Penny accuses her husband of beating her up.
20	9	"Loan Shark"	John Michael Phillips	Tim Aspinall	20 January 1986
A young mother caught shoplifting at a supermarket confesses to Sgt Cryer that she is in debt to a loanshark, "Aunty" Peg Miller. PC Edwards checks cases of fly-tipping and discovers some disaffected Welsh miners may be responsible. A Mrs Taylor makes a complaint about a noisy neighbour, but when WPC Ackland investigates she finds the neighbour dead.
21	10	"With Friends Like That...?"	Christopher Hodson	Barry Appleton	27 January 1986
Sgt Cryer brings in Debbie Lindfield, who is reluctant to report a rape. WPC Ackland has problems interviewing the rape victim because of the constant interference of the victim's friend, Sandra. Sandra then tells PC Muswell that Debbie got what she deserved from Sandra's boyfriend. DS Roach investigates a burglary with the householder claiming more jewellery was taken than has been recovered.
22	11	"Whose Side Are You On?"	Peter Cregeen	Jim Hill	3 February 1986
DC Mike Dashwood has organised a five-a-side indoor football match against a local youth group. Ch Supt Brownlow sees it as great publicity, and ropes in DI Roy Galloway for photo opportunities despite his objections. DS Ted Roach investigates the murder of an old derelict known only as King Henry. PC Carver injures his ankle chasing some bag-snatchers and Sgt Cryer takes his place on the team, though Dashwood thinks that Cryer is too old to do so. PC Lyttleton suggests WPC Martella, as she is good at netball. Dashwood convinces her to join the team, gaining brownie points from Mr Brownlow for selecting a WPC for the squad. PC Muswell arrests an unlicensed trader at the market selling fake designer watches. He chats up a traffic warden and arranges to meet her for a date, but she stands him up. Muswell turns up at the match and Cryer has a word with him about his prejudice against Lyttleton.
23	12	"The Chief Super's Party"	Peter Cregeen	Barry Appleton	10 February 1986
PCs Muswell and Lyttleton are on the lookout for a lorry full of stolen woollen coats. Ch Supt Brownlow is throwing a farewell party for his retiring clerk. DI Galloway questions DS Burnside when he gatecrashes the party, and Burnside admits that he fancies WPC Ackland. DC Dashwood realises that the scotch being poured at the bar has been stolen and Galloway asks Ackland to keep the remaining bottles aside as evidence. Despite warnings from the DI and the Chief Super, DS Roach drives home drunk and crashes his car into a fence. Knowing that he'll be sacked if he's found out, Roach sleeps on a friend's boat overnight while he sobers up, but spots the coat thieves on the docks when he awakens. The men are arrested when they are found stuck in a freezer. Roach also sweet-talks the man whose garden he crashed into by offering to get him into the Special Constabulary. PC Hollis grasses on Roach to Brownlow, in the hope of getting the clerk's job. Desperate to save his sergeant's career, Galloway gets Dashwood to trace the stolen scotch to Brownlow's golf club, and manages to get Roach off the hook.
