= The Bill series 1 =

The Bill
- Series 1
- No. of episodes: 11

Release
- Original network: ITV
- Original release: 16 October 1984 – 22 January 1985

Series chronology
- ← Previous; Pilot Next → Series 2

The first series of The Bill, a British television drama, consists of eleven episodes, broadcast between 16 October 1984 and 22 January 1985.

== Set and location ==
While Woodentop used a traditional three-wall set built at Thames Television's studios at Teddington, for the series, Sun Hill Police Station was created by converting the premises of a two-storey former cigarette packing company on the corner of Artichoke Hill and Pennington Street, in Wapping, East London.

The police station was significantly smaller than subsequent versions, with almost all of the interior offices being seen on-screen, only the original packing/warehouse area alongside the rear yard not featuring. Production offices doubled with some of the sets, with the canteen being used by cast and crew, and notably Chief Superintendent Brownlow's office actually being that of producer Michael Chapman. When shooting was taking place upstairs, the production team were unable to continue typing or to take phone calls.

Located in the shadow of the towering wall that surrounded the then-disused Tobacco Dock, and alongside the cobbles of Pennington Street, the nondescript 1950s building was very much in an East-End setting. Fronting onto the short stretch of road called Artichoke Hill, road signs were simply covered with those reading Sun Hill when exterior filming was taking place.

The use of real buildings instead of traditional sets within TV studios was very unusual at that time, with Channel Four's "Brookside" being one of the few others then to do so. Hand-held video cameras allowed the actors to move from within the building directly onto the street, something that was just not possible with traditional studio-based production and created a new degree of realism for the viewer.

Many of the crew enjoyed the autonomy of working at Thames' East London outpost; however, transport links to the area were then very poor and many of the Teddington-based staff disliked the cross-city journey from West London. This remained a constant at Artichoke Hill, and may have been a factor in the choice of a West London location when the filming base was forced to move for Series 3.

Many of the cast and crew shared their memories of making this first series for the book Witness Statements, including stars John Salthouse, Eric Richard, Trudie Goodwin, Mark Wingett, Peter Ellis, Nula Conwell, Jon Iles, Larry Dann, Colin Blumenau, Robert Hudson and Ashley Gunstock; along with costume designer Jennie Tate, stage managers Nigel Wilson and Marilyn Edwards, floor manager Julian Meers, production manager Derek Cotty, designer Philip Blowers, writer and technical advisor Barry Appleton and director Peter Cregeen.

== Industrial dispute ==
During 1984 a dispute between Thames Television and the technician's union, the ACTT led to a series of strikes which impacted the production and transmission on the ITV network of the first series.

The first series was due to consist of twelve episodes, but only eleven were fully completed. Scenes had already been shot for the missing episode, which was later completed as "The Chief Super's Party", with some rewriting reflecting cast changes, as the final episode of Series Two. In addition, a publicity photo featuring DI Galloway at a kitchen table, surrounded by food was also released within a Series One press pack, though the scene does not feature in any transmitted episodes.

The episodes "A Friend in Need" and "Clutching at Straws" were transmitted in their usual 9.00pm Tuesday slots on 23 and 30 October 1984, in the Thames TV (London) region only, as technicians had walked-out, leaving management to run the service. ACTT members in the other ITV companies supported their London-based colleagues by refusing to transmit Thames output across the network, so these episodes were shown in all other ITV regions on 29 January and 5 February 1985, a week after the last episode "The Sweet Smell of Failure" had been broadcast. Viewers in the Thames region saw two repeated episodes of The Sweeney on these two weeks.

== Titles and end credits ==
The first series used the well-known "walking feet" sequence to close, but also a related sequence of the officers walking toward the camera with just the police officer's caps visible as opening titles. This is intercut with still-photos of nearby locations to the production base including, Breezer's Hill, Metropolitan Wharf, Wapping Wall, Glamis Road and Leman Street.

Pennington Street in Wapping is the location of the cobbles that the officers walk along. Subsequent updates of the end credits continued to be shot there, even when the production base moved to other locations from 1986.

Actors Karen England and Paul Page-Hanson are the male and female officers. Both appear as extras in the first series.

== Cast and characters ==
=== Changes ===
Although the series is a continuation of the one-off play, a number of casting and character changes were made.

The character of Sergeant Wilding changes name to Sergeant Cryer, and was recast with Eric Richard replacing Peter Dean. Since the transmission of "Woodentop", Dean had secured the role of Pete Beale in EastEnders, following the re-casting of the original choice, Leslie Grantham, as Den Watts.

Robert Pugh, who had appeared as DI Galloway, decided shortly before production was due to begin that he did not want to commit to a series and the role was recast with John Salthouse.

The senior uniformed officer, Inspector Deeping, was replaced with Chief Superintendent Brownlow, played by Peter Ellis. Ellis had auditioned originally for one of the CID characters, but was felt to be too old.

PC Morgan's name was changed to PC Edwards, although still played by Colin Blumenau.

Larry Dann was offered the part of Sergeant Alec Peters the day before filming of the first episode, after the actor originally cast in the role repeatedly forgot his lines.

Both Jon Iles (DC Dashwood) and Tony Scannell (DS Roach) were initially booked to appear in only two episodes.

The original casting was the responsibility of Pat O'Connell, and there is a strong link with some of the original male cast appearing in successful plays at the Royal Court Theatre in London during early 1983. John Salthouse and Eric Richard took the lead roles in the Martin Allen play Red Saturday, and Gary Olsen, Mark Wingett and Robert Pugh all appeared in "Welcome Home".

=== Main characters ===
- PC Jim Carver – Mark Wingett
- PC Dave Litten – Gary Olsen
- PC Taffy Edwards – Colin Blumenau
- PC Reg Hollis – Jeff Stewart
- PC Robin Frank – Ashley Gunstock
- PC Yorkie Smith – Robert Hudson
- WPC June Ackland – Trudie Goodwin
- WPC Viv Martella – Nula Conwell
- Sgt Jack Wilding – Peter Dean
- Sgt Bob Cryer – Eric Richard
- Sgt Tom Penny – Roger Leach
- Sgt Alec Peters – Larry Dann
- Insp Sam Deeping – Jon Croft
- DC Mike Dashwood – Jon Iles
- DS Ted Roach – Tony Scannell
- DI Roy Galloway – John Salthouse
- Ch Supt Charles Brownlow – Peter Ellis

=== Minor characters ===
- Duty Sgt Crosland – Phil Rowlands ("Funny Ol' Business – Cops & Robbers")
- Duty Det Sgt – Neil Conrich ("Funny Ol' Business – Cops & Robbers", "Long Odds")
- Duty Det Sgt Danes – Trevor Cooper ("Long Odds")
- Duty PC – Pat Gorman (Uncredited: "Clutching at Straws", "It's Not Such a Bad Job After All", "The Drugs Raid")
- Duty PC Peters – Greg Cruttwell ("Burning the Books")
- Duty PC Fox – Gary Raynsford ("A Friend in Need")
- Duty WPC Picton – Tessa Bell-Briggs
- Complaints Department DCI Kirk – Ray Armstrong ("Long Odds")
- Complaints Department DI Wheeler – Michael N. Harbour ("Long Odds")
- WPC – Vikki Gee-Dare (Uncredited: "A Friend in Need", "The Drugs Raid", "Rough in the Afternoon")
- PC Tony Stamp – Graham Cole (Uncredited PC throughout series 1–3, before becoming a full-time cast member in series 4)
- Scenes of Crime Officer – Ralph Watson ("Funny Ol' Business – Cops & Robbers", "It's Not Such a Bad Job After All" and "A Dangerous Breed")

== Episodes ==
No. overall	No. in series	Title	Directed by	Written by	Original release date
1	1	"Funny Ol' Business – Cops and Robbers"	Peter Cregeen	Geoff McQueen	16 October 1984
Carver is still getting used to life at Sun Hill, as he continues to raise his popularity level amongst the other officers. Meanwhile, Brownlow has ordered the uniform relief onto the streets of Sun Hill to lower the increase of crime in the area. Carver attempts to get into Brownlow's good books by capturing a car thief. Meanwhile, Galloway is desperate to get some results on a breaking and entering spree. When flying squad detective Frank "Tommy" Burnside arrives asking Galloway for help after one of his snouts is arrested, it soon becomes clear that there's history between him and Cryer.
2	2	"A Friend in Need"	Peter Cregeen	Barry Appleton	23 October 1984
When a spate of bomb hoaxes begins to threaten peace and harmony in Sun Hill, Brownlow becomes eager to find the hoax callers and stop chaos from breaking out. Meanwhile, Galloway bets Cryer he is the perfect man to solve the case, recruiting Roach and Dashwood to help him. Cryer gives Carver the responsibility of showing a newly qualified officer, Higgins, the ways of Sun Hill – but a run-in with a local drunk who later accuses Carver of stealing his wallet leaves every officer on the uniform relief wondering if Carver is capable enough to do the job without bringing the social aspect into disrepute.
3	3	"Clutching at Straws"	Christopher Hodson	Geoff McQueen	30 October 1984
When a gang of thugs use violence to extort money from local youths, Brownlow takes a hands off approach – and claims that he would rather play golf than try to save the residents of the 'dump' of an estate. However, Carver is determined to improve the situation on the estate by proposing the reopening of a local youth club while getting to the bottom of who is attacking the loyal youth. Meanwhile, Cryer and Galloway investigate a series of attempted child abductions involving young girls. They are unaware that their prime suspect – Simon Doleman – was talking to Carver just hours before – and has since been on a violent rampage, even attempting to rape his own mother.
4	4	"Long Odds"	John Michael Phillips	Geoff McQueen	6 November 1984
Litten's day goes from bad to worse when he gets on the wrong side of both Galloway and Cryer. Attempting to earn some brownie points, he goes to the governor to identify the suspect in a series of armed robberies. As Roach and Dashwood go off in pursuit of the robber, they find themselves at the scene of a post office raid. Roach enters the building before armed backup arrives, and Dashwood realises what danger Roach is putting himself in, and goes in hot pursuit. But is he already too late? Meanwhile, Edwards pursues a mugger into a derelict building, but is left trapped when the floor collapses beneath him.
5	5	"It's Not Such a Bad Job After All"	John Woods	Barry Appleton	13 November 1984
The discovery of a body of a teenage suicide leaves a bitter taste in Ackland's mouth, and finding herself being drawn into a seedy world of pornography, drugs and prostitution, Ackland considers leaving Sun Hill for good after the situation is made worse by Galloway, who gives her a hard time over calling him out of bed on a Sunday morning. When it is discovered that the girl was three months pregnant at the time of her death, Galloway goes all out to make sure the investigation doesn't drag the girl's name through the mud, and her parents are protected from finding out what their daughter was really like.
6	6	"The Drugs Raid"	John Woods	Barry Appleton	20 November 1984
Under pressure from local residents to flush out drug dealers on the local estates, Galloway asks one of his informants to go undercover when he learns that a disused cinema in the centre of the borough is now being used as a drugs den. As he and CID prepare a raid on the premises, his informant is stabbed and killed by a gang leader. A guilty Galloway then receives further bad news when Carver and Edwards reveal that the suspect they pursued with the cartel of drugs managed to get away – driving a car with diplomatic plates. Brownlow struggles to find common ground between Galloway and the Home Office.
7	7	"A Dangerous Breed"	Christopher Hodson	Barry Appleton	27 November 1984
Litten is up for promotion, and he is desperate to prove himself to Galloway. When Lord Barstow-Smythe's valuable necklace is stolen, Galloway orders Litten to investigate, while he attends court to give evidence in a murder trial. However, Litten's determination to succeed looks set to be his downfall, when he makes a bargain with a mystery caller who makes a promise to return the necklace. Litten is soon lured into a web of traps, including two young youths who are set up for a crime they didn't commit. Can Litten save face, and himself, before Galloway discovers his mistakes? With Osmund Bullock as Lord Barstow-Smythe.
8	8	"Rough in the Afternoon"	Christopher Hodson	John Kershaw	4 December 1984
Litten finds himself for the high jump when he allows a man to take a car from the police pound that does not belong to him. Meanwhile, Carver and Edwards are called out to a domestic, where they discover that a custody battle between two warring parents has spiralled out of control. Ackland is tasked with consoling the boy's mother, leaving CID on the hunt for a desperate, violent father who has abducted his two-year-old son. Desperate to right his mistakes, Litten tracks the car down, only to find that all of the gear inside has been nicked – along with a second car parked next to it.
9	9	"Burning the Books"	Peter Cregeen	Barry Appleton	8 January 1985
CID are on the trail of a thug who has stolen an important briefcase. Investigating further leads them to the Arthur Daley of Sun Hill and an old adversary of Galloway's. Realising that this is his chance to nail his toughest adversary, Galloway endures on a mission to stop chaos from breaking out, with a factory fire and a pornography business getting in the way.
10	10	"Death of a Cracksman"	Christopher Hodson	Barry Appleton	15 January 1985
Alfie Mullins is a non-returned prisoner, not a dangerous prisoner as reported. He is an old-fashioned safe-cracker who, just as he is returning to the prison, is approached by one of a gang of thieves who want Alfie to open a safe they pinched. While they are talking, Alfie is suddenly killed. Galloway decides to investigate and the uniform officers retrieve the safe. But unknown to them, they have brought an explosion waiting to happen to Sun Hill.
11	11	"The Sweet Smell of Failure"	John Michael Phillips	Barry Appleton	22 January 1985
A tip in a counterfeit perfume case leads Carver and Ackland to two old-age pensioners who have a reputation of stealing things going as far back as WWII. After bringing them in for questioning, Carver and Ackland are led on a wild goose chase by the old couple. But it soon arises that they are not the real culprits. Can Ackland and Carver work together to find the real thieves?
