= The Bill series 5 =

Season of television series

The Bill
- Series 5
- Series 5 Australian DVD cover
- No. of episodes: 104

Release
- Original network: ITV
- Original release: 3 January – 28 December 1989

Series chronology
- ← Previous; Series 4 Next → Series 6

The fifth series of The Bill, a British television drama, consists of 104 episodes, broadcast between 3 January and 28 December 1989.

== DVD releases ==
The series was first released on DVD as part of the Collection 3 and Collection 4 DVD boxsets in Australia, made available on 8 August – 7 November 2007, respectively. The first four episodes of the series were later issued on DVD in the United Kingdom, under the title Volume 4, on 15 March 2010. The next thirteen episodes of series 5 were released on DVD in the UK, under the title Volume 5, on 11 July 2011, the next 48 episodes of Series five were released on DVD in the UK under the title Volume 6, on 15 October 2012 and the remaining episodes were released on DVD in the UK under the title Volume 7, on 2 September 2013.

The series was later reissued as two half-series boxsets in Australia, released on 7 March 2012. The above DVD artwork is taken from the most recent Australian release. It features images of DC Jim Carver and Sgt Bob Cryer. The British volume artwork features a collage image featuring a variety of characters from across the season. The original Collection boxsets contained sole images of PC Pete Ramsey and WPC June Ackland, respectively.

== Cast and crew commentaries ==
A number of The Bill Video/Audio Commentaries for Series 5 episodes have been recorded with cast and crew, including actors Colin Blumenau (PC Taffy Edwards), Larry Dann (Sgt Alec Peters), Trudie Goodwin (WPC June Ackland), Robert Hudson (PC Yorkie Smith), Chris Humphreys (PC Richard Turnham), Jon Iles (DC Mike Dashwood), Andrew Mackintosh (DS Alastair Greig), Nick Reding (PC Pete Ramsey) and Barbara Thorn (Insp Christine Frazer), writers Garry Lyons, Christopher Russell and J. C. Wilsher, and directors Niall Leonard and Jan Sargent.

== Cast changes ==
=== Arrivals ===
- PC Timothy Able
- WPC Norika Datta
- PC George Garfield
- DS Alistair Greig
- WPC Cathy Marshall
- PC Dave Quinnan
- PC Richard Turnham
- PC Phil Young

=== Departures ===
- WPC Claire Brind
- PC Robin Frank
- PC Malcolm Haynes
- PC Pete Ramsey
- PC Yorkie Smith

== Episodes ==
| No. overall | No. in series | Title | Directed by | Written by | Episode notes | Original release date | Guest(s) |
|---|---|---|---|---|---|---|---|
| TBA | 1 | "Getting It Right" | Terry Daw | Barry Appleton | First appearance of DS Alistair Greig | 3 January 1989 | Bernard Horsfall and Brian Miller |
While hunting for a man suspected of abduction, DI Frank Burnside is given the wrong information by PC Pete Ramsey and raids a doctor's hotel room. When the doctor threatens to lodge an official complaint, Burnside and Ramsey try to dig deep into the doctor's past for a bargaining chip. Frank must also come to terms with his new sergeant; DS Alistair Greig seems to prefer playing the clarinet in the Police Band to nicking villains!
| TBA | 2 | "A Reflection of Glory" | Christopher Hodson | Brendan J. Cassin | — | 5 January 1989 | Richard Graham and Stefan Schwartz |
Ramsey is back in uniform and goes with PC Haynes to see about a shoplifter who claims she is innocent. While they are out the back, the shop is held up by armed robbers who shoot at Ramsey. DI Burnside thinks it is tied in with other robberies and sends DC Carver to have a word with his evasive snout, Leroy. DC Dashwood has a new suit much to the amusement of his colleagues. It gets damaged while he is chasing one of the suspects in the robbery. Ackland and Melvin arrest a man with a knife threatening suicide in a gay club.
| TBA | 3 | "One To One" | Jan Sargent | Christopher Russell | — | 10 January 1989 | Arabella Weir |
A councillor's drug-addicted daughter causes trouble for WPC June Ackland and PC Tony Stamp. She takes June hostage in her paraffin soaked flat, June tries to keep her calm but the woman ends up setting fire to the room, June wrestles with her and Tony comes to their aid.
| TBA | 4 | "The Mugging and the Gypsies" | Barry Davis | David Halliwell | — | 12 January 1989 | Albert Welling and Melanie Hill |
Edwards, Yorkie Smith and Ackland try to enforce a child protection order on a Gypsy family and take their child into protective custody. They end up towing the caravan with the gypsies inside back to Sun Hill. Meanwhile DC Lines and WPC Martella investigate a beating and mugging of a man. They prepare an identity parade for the man to pick out a suspect when suddenly his wife admits she was the one who beat him.
| TBA | 5 | "The Chain of Command" | Robert Tronson | Christopher Short | — | 17 January 1989 | Stella Gonet and Gilbert Wynne |
A woman comes into the station with her head bleeding telling Smith she can't go home. Yorkie assumes her husband had been beating her and Martella tries to get her to press charges, but it turns out it was her boyfriend that was beating her not her husband; she can't go home as her husband will see the bruises. The husband later turns up at the station and attacks Yorkie. Ramsey and Ackland nick a gang of drunks under a fly over. The drunks then have a brawl in the cells. The DTI (department of trade and industry) meet with Ch Insp Conway and demand he assigns officers to help them close down "Radio Sun Hill", a pirate radio station.
| TBA | 6 | "Life and Death" | Robert Tronson | Kieran Prendiville | — | 19 January 1989 | Elisabeth Sladen and Arthur Blake |
PC Tony Stamp and WPC Claire Brind bring a drunk into the station. In the man's drunk ramblings to Sgt Alec Peters he mentions he has killed someone just before he passes out from a suspected drug overdose. Lines investigates; his wife is safe and well but she tells them he has been having an affair with another woman. Melvin goes to inform a woman her husband has died in an accident at work but after breaking the news, Ken suspects he's been given the wrong address. It turns out Ken is right and he's just told the wrong woman her husband is dead. Insp Frazer arrives to tell the woman about the mistake but her husband walks in before Christine can tell her. Ken then has to go and tell the correct woman her husband has died.
| TBA | 7 | "Hothead" | Phillip Casson | Edwin Pearce | — | 24 January 1989 | Larry Martyn, Michael Melia and Stephen Churchett |
Martella brings in two schoolgirls who she found chatting up lorry drivers trying to hitch a lift to Manchester. Bob Cryer gives them a telling off about the danger they were putting themselves in. Brind attempts to calm an angry gang of workers threatening their boss because they are facing redundancy. It ends up in a brawl. One of the men grabs Claire's radio and smashes it, then locks her in a room. Melvin comes to the rescue. Sgt Cryer gets into trouble for allegedly thumping a prisoner.
| TBA | 8 | "Steamers" | Terry Green | Gerry Huxham | — | 26 January 1989 | Timothy Bateson |
Melvin is sent to check out a strong smell coming from a flat. Finding a man dead, Ken suspects foul play and that drug users have been in the flat. Roach is sent to investigate. He finds out a gang of squatters were living in the flat and they might be responsible for the man's death. It turns out the man died from a heart attack. Meanwhile Dashwood and Carver lead an investigation into a steaming gang who are responsible for doing over restaurants. DS Roach is left fuming as he feels he has been sidelined with the steaming case.
| TBA | 9 | "Duty Elsewhere" | Jeremy Summers | Brendan J. Cassin | — | 31 January 1989 | Ricco Ross |
PC Malcolm Haynes goes undercover posing as a driver called Curtis for a gang headed up by "Mr Tubbs". He has been asked to investigate the gang, as they are responsible for a murder and drug dealing. Haynes is sent to pick up a package for Tubbs but after dropping the parcel off he gets recognised as a police officer by one of the gang and they attack him just as the police raid the place. It turns out the murder victim's hand was in the parcel.
| TBA | 10 | "Saturday Blues" | Jeremy Summers | David Squire | — | 2 February 1989 | Julia Chambers, Roy Skelton and Adrienne Burgess |
Burnside's goddaughter Tracy is in a coma after an overdose. Martella arrives at the hospital with the wounded from a wedding party who have been fighting. Burnside goes for Tracy's boyfriend in the interview room, believing him responsible for her overdose. Tracy dies and Frank has to break the news to her parents in Australia.
| TBA | 11 | "N.F.A." | Keith Washington | Arthur McKenzie | — | 7 February 1989 | Peter-Hugo Daly, Betty Marsden and John Ringham |
Lines helps a prisoner who is struggling with addiction, which draws him into conflict with Ramsey. An elderly mugging victim makes complaints against half the station, including Ch Supt Brownlow.
| TBA | 12 | "The Price You Pay" | Keith Washington | Kieran Prendiville | — | 9 February 1989 | Debbie Arnold, Godfrey James and Tony Osoba |
When a diplomat evades punishment for beating up a friend of Martella's, Roach fails to prevent the girls father assaulting him, to Viv's fury. Stamp and Haynes intervene in a dispute between a bookie and his customers. The outcome is a favourable one for the relief.
| TBA | 13 | "The Key of the Door" | Christopher Hodson | Barry Appleton | — | 14 February 1989 | Shirin Taylor |
Cryer discovers a young boy has been abusing his mother. Carver and Lines reluctantly arrest a brothel-keeper, while Burnside and Dashwood crack a robbery spree and Ramsey plots to catch a disqualified driver.
| TBA | 14 | "Cock Up" | Brian Farnham | Tony Grounds | — | 16 February 1989 | Rod Culbertson, Dave Atkins and Ricci Harnett |
Cryer's son could be the key to arresting two local drug dealers. The result, however, is not what is expected.
| TBA | 15 | "Repercussions" | Brian Farnham | Tony Grounds | — | 21 February 1989 | Rod Culbertson, Dave Atkins and John Fortune |
The aftermath of Burnside's drug raid leaves Sun Hill in trouble with the public and a bad taste with the relief.
| TBA | 16 | "A Death in the Family" | Christopher Hodson | John Foster | — | 23 February 1989 | Eric Deacon |
Tragedy strikes when a couples infant son dies. But Sgt Cryer remembers it has happened to them before.
| TBA | 17 | "In the Frame" | Barry Davis | Barry Appleton | — | 28 February 1989 | William Simons |
Burnside finds himself framed by a corrupt colleague; Lines has a race against time to clear his name. Cryer tells a young American army Sergeant to move his illegally parked car. As he gets in, a bomb planted in the back seat explodes, killing him. Cryer is only slightly injured, but is perturbed by the US military blaming him for the soldiers death.
| TBA | 18 | "A Good Result" | Jeremy Summers | Christopher Russell | — | 2 March 1989 | Oliver Parker |
Yorkie Smith goes undercover with a gang of football hooligans. As the rest of the relief have a quiet afternoon at the stadium, Yorkie finds himself in deeper than he planned.
| TBA | 19 | "Conscience" | Jeremy Summers | Barry Appleton | — | 7 March 1989 | Patrick O'Connell |
Roach favours a pub date with a married woman over informing witnesses about court appearances. A chance encounter with an old boss brings memories of a long-forgotten case to the fore.
| TBA | 20 | "Sunday Sunday" | Terry Marcel | Richard LeParmentier and Paddy Fletcher | — | 9 March 1989 | Ann Way |
A racist group rampages through the market; Sun Hill's cells are soon fit to burst. Ackland attends a woman's death where her son confesses to killing her.
| TBA | 21 | "Climate" | Brian Parker | P. J. Hammond | — | 14 March 1989 | Robin Soans |
Roach interviews a rude and unpleasant man who was a witness in a child rape case.
| TBA | 22 | "Bad Company" | Terry Marcel | Brendan J. Cassin | — | 16 March 1989 | Steve McFadden, Victor Winding and Cyril Shaps |
Melvin unwittingly interrupts an arms deal, and Dashwood and Carver hunt for a bail hostel resident being chased by thugs.
| TBA | 23 | "Suspicious Minds" | Terry Green | Kieran Prendiville | — | 21 March 1989 | Kellie Bright |
A raid on a pornography ring goes wrong. But did the tip-off come from Sun Hill or the Obscene Publications squad?
| TBA | 24 | "Intuition" | Brian Parker | Jonathan Rich | — | 23 March 1989 | Del Henney, Trevor Byfield and Harry Fielder |
The main suspect in a gold bullion robbery has returned home from Spain after 2 years. Roach works through the night attempting to prove he did it before he has to be released, with help from a less-than-thrilled Lines.
| TBA | 25 | "Loss" | Brian Farnham | P. J. Hammond | — | 28 March 1989 | — |
Yorkie and Martella are tasked with clearing up some missing person cases.
| TBA | 26 | "Procedure" | Terry Green | John Milne | — | 30 March 1989 | — |
The fraud squad, Customs and Excise, ram-raiders and Sgt Peters' lax attitude to paperwork cause chaos on a busy day for Sun Hill.
| TBA | 27 | "Luck of the Draw" | Keith Washington | Patrick Harkins | — | 4 April 1989 | Allan Surtees and Ian Redford |
Roach goes undercover in a brewery to catch a gang running a lottery scam.
| TBA | 28 | "No Strings" | Brian Farnham | Kevin Clarke | — | 6 April 1989 | Paul O'Grady (Credited as Paul Savage) |
Tosh is saved from two teenager muggers by a fortune teller who has had her crystal balls stolen. Roach and Martella arrest half a nightclub trying to catch a gang of purse snatchers. Roach's snout Roxanne helps him crack the case, but at a terrible cost.
| TBA | 29 | "Fool's Gold" | Keith Washington | David Squire | — | 11 April 1989 | Billy Murray and Danny Webb |
An armed robber makes a deal with Burnside, and grasses on a big-time villain. DI Jackman from the serious crime squad rubs the Sun Hill team up the wrong way. Notes: Billy Murray would join the cast as DS Don Beech on 1995.
| TBA | 30 | "The Visit" | Alan Wareing | Barry Appleton | — | 13 April 1989 | John Hamill, Ian Collier, Gordon Reid, Luan Peters and Brian Hall |
Martella is held hostage while visiting a prison. A foreigner is executed at a shopping mall. CID try to find out who he is, and why he was killed.
| TBA | 31 | "One For the Ladies" | Terry Green | Brendan J. Cassin | — | 18 April 1989 | — |
A Polish tie salesman in his fifties has a fatal heart attack in a grubby hotel. Greig and Lines discover he has left behind a string of young attractive wives. Brind and Melvin stumble upon a robbery at a bingo hall.
| TBA | 32 | "No Shelter" | Terry Marcel | Julian Jones | — | 20 April 1989 | Kelly Marcel and Mark Haddigan |
A stormy morning heralds a busy shift for the relief. Martella has a particularly bad day; after being shot at by an escaping burglar, she is cut while assisting to break up a fight at a party.
| TBA | 33 | "Out to Lunch" | Brian Parker | Julian Jones | — | 25 April 1989 | Brian Capron, Michael Mellinger and Adrienne Burgess |
An Italian couple previously arrested by Haynes and Ramsey cause havoc on their new estate, leading to an attempted murder suspect running loose at the hospital. Brind is the hero when she stops him, although she is still the target for a prank.
| TBA | 34 | "Free Wheel" | Alan Wareing | P. J. Hammond | — | 27 April 1989 | Liz Gebhardt |
CID is fully occupied monitoring an arms dealer while a couple continually annoy Yorkie Smith about a stolen car.
| TBA | 35 | "Only a Bit of Thieving" | Brian Parker | Chris Barlas | First appearance of PC George Garfield | 2 May 1989 | Hazel McBride and Nicholas Pinnock |
Roach is accused of attempted murder after a teenager burglar falls from a roof. He's cleared, but when the boy dies he feels the others blame him.
| TBA | 36 | "Communications" | Alan Wareing | Jonathan Rich | — | 4 May 1989 | Oliver Haden |
While asking door-to-door about a missing girl, Edwards and Brind have to deal with a shift worker smashing up a car whose alarm won't stop. Conway, fresh from a course, is keen to have the relief come to him and talk about their problems, until Edwards comes to him with a real issue.
| TBA | 37 | "Silver Lining" | Mike Dormer | Colin Giffin | — | 9 May 1989 | Catherine Schell |
After enjoying driving a stolen Rolls-Royce back to the yard, Haynes finds £80k of silver bullion in the boot.
| TBA | 38 | "Suffocation Job" | Brian Farnham | P. J. Hammond | — | 11 May 1989 | Yvonne Antrobus and Liz Fraser |
June Ackland visits a woman with agoraphobia, while Melvin investigates a series of burglaries where the offender opens all the doors and windows.
| TBA | 39 | "Mickey Would Have Wanted It" | Brian Farnham | Kieran Prendiville | — | 16 May 1989 | Peter Guinness |
Melvin is hospitalised during an armed robbery. Burnside must prove his suspect did it, despite the fact he was at a funeral with him at the same time. The station's toilets are blocked. Luckily there is a plumber in one of the cells!
| TBA | 40 | "Blood Ties" | Mike Dormer | Chris Barlas | — | 19 May 1989 | David Collings |
Stamp and Brind delve into the heart of a serious domestic and Sun Hill tries to locate an escaped prisoner.
| TBA | 41 | "You'll Be Back" | Richard Standeven | Shirley Cooklin | — | 23 May 1989 | Dominic Keating |
Brind and Ramsey disagree over how to handle a troubled shoplifter. Cryer tries to keep a stallholder he is friendly with out of prison after he is arrested for assault while on licence. Lines gives him assistance, though Insp Frazer isn't particularly happy.
| TBA | 42 | "Fort Apache – Sun Hill" | Antonia Bird | Barry Appleton | — | 25 May 1989 | Tom Georgeson, Bill Stewart and Tip Tipping |
A prison officer strike leaves the Sun Hill cells overflowing, with Roach trying to keep his murder suspect separate. A Chief Superintendent Milan arrives from Scotland Yard to check the books, but his ulterior motive means trouble for Melvin and Roach. Smith and Ramsey stop a smuggling operation. Expecting drugs or guns, they are surprised to find out the cargo is three rare bird eggs.
| TBA | 43 | "Waste" | Richard Standeven | Al Hunter | — | 30 May 1989 | Suzanne Bertish and John Barrard |
The illegal dumping of chemicals in the river causes two deaths. CID try to work out if they can bring manslaughter charges against the culprits.
| TBA | 44 | "The Strong Survive" | Sharon Miller | Brendan J. Cassin | — | 1 June 1989 | Dexter Fletcher and Michael Robbins |
CID track a drug dealer who they hope will lead them to his supplier.
| TBA | 45 | "Loving Care" | Michael Owen Morris | Al Hunter | — | 6 June 1989 | Philippa Urquhart |
Carver believes someone is using a mentally disabled girl to commit burglaries. Dashwood investigates a robbery of a nightclub by its own assistant manager.
| TBA | 46 | "Back on the Streets" | Alan Wareing | Simon Moss | — | 8 June 1989 | — |
Carver and Lines attempt to find an escaped prisoner. Edwards is fed up with the job after finding an old lady dead in her flat. Hollis causes consternation by resigning as collator and asking to return to the relief.
| TBA | 47 | "FAT'AC" | John Bruce | Julian Jones | — | 13 June 1989 | Roy Boyd and Tony Haygarth |
When he is forced to deal with a fatal accident alone, Yorkie starts to doubt his future at Sun Hill. In 2020, actor Robert Hudson (Yorkie) recorded an audio commentary for this episode, released exclusively on Patreon.
| TBA | 48 | "Somewhere By Chance" | Terry Marcel | Barry Appleton | — | 15 June 1989 | Bruce Alexander |
A soldier claims he has planted a bomb in a shopping complex. Brind has a fortunate escape from a dangerous man.
| TBA | 49 | "A Quiet Life" | Sharon Miller | Simon Moss | First appearance of PC Cathy Marshall | 20 June 1989 | Race Davies and Arthur Smith |
WPC Cathy Marshall arrives at Sun Hill to take over as collator from Reg.
| TBA | 50 | "Tom Tiddler's Ground" | John Bruce | P. J. Hammond | — | 22 June 1989 | Peter Benson |
Ackland and Martella are on patrol in the park, while CID are awaiting a visitor in the adjacent street.
| TBA | 51 | "Make My Day" | Michael Ferguson | Barry Appleton | First appearances of PCs Richard Turnham and Timothy Able | 27 June 1989 | Martin Benson, John Abineri and Arthur Whybrow |
Hollis is back on the beat as the relief deal with a spate of flare attacks on neighbourhood watch houses. New PC Richard Turnham impresses Burnside during an undercover operation.
| TBA | 52 | "Provocation" | Michael Ferguson | Edwin Pearce | — | 29 June 1989 | JoAnne Good |
Dashwood is dealing with two cases – speaking to a nervy site foreman about robberies made on building sites and arguing with the father of a boy riding a stolen moped – when he is assaulted in a lorry park. But which man is responsible?
| TBA | 53 | "Overspend" | Terry Marcel | Christopher Russell | — | 4 July 1989 | Colin Spaull and Ralph Watson |
Brownlow's new money saving scheme forces CID to take the bus to crimescenes. Edwards spends his last day before his holiday evading time-consuming jobs. After helping Carver bring in a bail jumping thief who has glued herself to her bed he flees before he has to join Burnside at court as a witness.
| TBA | 54 | "Between Friends" | Barry Davis | Barry Appleton | — | 6 July 1989 | John Horsley, Richard Moore and David McAlister |
Brownlow is invited to join a golf club.
| TBA | 55 | "Traffic" | Bill Brayne | Christopher Russell | Final appearance of PC Robin Frank | 11 July 1989 | Leslie Ash and Gordon Reid |
Cryer joins new PC Turnham on his beat. After bringing in a girl who was sitting painting in the middle of the road, they assist Greig in investigating a hit-and-run which has put a young child in hospital. In 2020, actors Andrew Mackintosh (DS Alastair Greig), Chris Humphreys (PC Richard Turnham) and writer Christopher Russell recorded a Zoom Commentary for this episode, released exclusively on Patreon.
| TBA | 56 | "The Sacred Seal" | Michael Owen Morris | Brendan J. Cassin | — | 13 July 1989 | Philip Middlemiss |
When Carver chases a man who has just held up a bookmakers into a chapel, the Priest refuses to identify him.
| TBA | 57 | "Subsequent Visits" | Bill Brayne | Arthur McKenzie | — | 18 July 1989 | — |
Garfield and Stamp's competitive spirit spells trouble for the borough's petty criminals, and an exasperated Tom Penny. Lines can't wait for his holiday, but the new car he has bought for going away helps to solve a burglary.
| TBA | 58 | "User Friendly" | Graham Theakston | Barry Appleton | — | 20 July 1989 | — |
A light aircraft from Belgium crash-lands in a Sun Hill park. Melvin and Ackland transport a prisoner from Cumbria on a public disorder charge, only for Chief Inspector Conway to receive a phone call revealing she is involved in a bombing.
| TBA | 59 | "Don't Like Mondays" | Antonia Bird | Barry Appleton | Final appearance of PC Pete Ramsey | 25 July 1989 | Helena Little and Natasha Williams |
Yorkie and Edwards respond to a disturbance at a bank only to find Lines' wife causing a scene with her children because she can't withdraw any money. Ramsey and Ackland arrive only to realise the bank is being robbed as well. As a frantic Lines tries to reach his family, Ramsey is shot trying to stop him. (He would end up being invalided out of the force.) As the five raiders try to leave with Edwards as a hostage in a car deliberately disabled by Cryer, Taffy escapes their clutches and they are gunned down by PT17 officers. Notes: Natasha Williams would join the cast as WPC Delia French in 1990.
| TBA | 60 | "Pickup" | Michael Owen Morris | John Milne | — | 27 July 1989 | — |
The relief deal with Ramsey's shooting in different ways. Haynes gets angry at the public and his colleagues, and tears into Lines after picking up Ramsey's possessions at the hospital. An operation to pick up working girls is used as a cover by Burnside to get details of a planned armed robbery. As CID and the robbery squad celebrate the expected result, Lines has the suspect arrested for a lesser offence.
| TBA | 61 | "Kidding" | Michael Ferguson | Jonathan Rich | — | 1 August 1989 | Madhav Sharma |
Martella is frustrated at having to work on domestic violence cases. Marshall explains to her why abused women stay with bad partners. Stamp and Turnham respond to a report of juveniles bag-snatching, and Stamp faces a claim of assault.
| TBA | 62 | "Black Spot" | Michael Owen Morris | Arthur McKenzie | — | 3 August 1989 | Brian Hibbard, Julie Graham and Desmond McNamara |
Lines is eager to arrest a villain who beats up his wife for speaking to the police but is accused by Burnside of seeking revenge. When he threatens Tosh's wife, Lines loses his rag and hits Burnside. Roach is bitten during a robbery, leading Tosh to his man.
| TBA | 63 | "Taken for a Ride" | Terry Marcel | Barry Appleton | — | 8 August 1989 | Michael Cochrane and Keith Drinkel |
Roach becomes eligible for promotion to Inspector and faces an intimidating assessment panel. He is punched during a lunchtime pub session and storms out of the interview, believing he has wasted his time. The rest of CID has just as unproductive a day, on a wild goose chase of a stolen lorry.
| TBA | 64 | "Time Out" | Terry Marcel | Barry Appleton | — | 10 August 1989 | Ben Onwukwe, Charles Lawson and Brian Croucher |
A robbery squad surveillance target is abducted. After an armed robbery takes place, he turns up outside his house. Roach is still angry at the board passing him over and offers Burnside his resignation. His observation of a detail solving the armed robbery has Burnside refuse.
| TBA | 65 | "Leaving" | Terry Marcel | Christopher Russell | Final regular appearance of PC Yorkie Smith | 15 August 1989 | Declan Mulholland, Kathy Burke and Elizabeth Bradley |
Yorkie's last day at Sun Hill leads him to a shop lease scam. The relief plan a couple of farewell pranks for him.
| TBA | 66 | "Street Games and Board Games" | Barry Davis | J. C. Wilsher | — | 17 August 1989 | Rebecca Lacey and David Savile |
Brownlow attends a training session for Chief Superintendents and deals sternly with a computer simulated riot. Meanwhile, a drugs raid by CID might well lead to the real thing on the streets.
| TBA | 67 | "Pressure" | Barry Davis | Kevin Clarke | Final appearance of PC Malcolm Haynes | 22 August 1989 | Joseph Marcell and Aimée Delamain |
Haynes is selected for Sergeant but is suspicious the Metropolitan Police are only interested in the colour of his skin. Stamp and Edwards chase a well-known hapless robber who steals a double-decker bus, while Edwards' wife goes to the station to accuse Cryer of not allowing him to transfer back to Wales.
| TBA | 68 | "A Little Knowledge" | James Cellan Jones | Christopher Russell | — | 24 August 1989 | — |
Lines goes undercover to infiltrate a minicab firm which hosts illegal gambling, but when Greig commands the raid they burst into the back of the wrong shop. Garfield disguises himself as a deliveryman in order to catch two robbers targeting a pizza shop. Carver's attempt to prank Marshall backfires.
| TBA | 69 | "Pathways" | Michael Ferguson | P. J. Hammond | — | 29 August 1989 | George Waring |
Peters and Brind, on scene at a crash, are asked to deal with the illicit goings on in an allotment garden. A missing person report leads them back to the allotment.
| TBA | 70 | "Seen To Be Done" | James Cellan Jones | Jonathan Rich | — | 31 August 1989 | James Cosmo |
Sgt Penny makes the drunks leave the cells at 5am in anticipation of the next shift, with one destitute named McPhee begging to stay. He is later found dead in the front interview room, with hand and head injuries. Penny is interviewed by Det Ch Supt Cameron and DS Barry as the death is investigated and Hollis sits in as the federation representative.
| TBA | 71 | "Tulip" | Keith Washington | Barry Appleton | — | 5 September 1989 | Michael Attwell, Trevor Cooper and Ilario Bisi-Pedro |
Roach and Dashwood execute a warrant for a GBH at a rugby club on a neighbouring ground. On the way back to the station they intervene in a fight between a couple, who turn out to be a pimp and his girl. As both chase the man, the woman stabs their prisoner. They have to work with the local officers to find the culprit, and stop the news getting out.
| TBA | 72 | "Nothing But The Truth" | Keith Washington | Arthur McKenzie | — | 7 September 1989 | Kevin McNally |
Carver is in the doghouse. After landing Burnside in trouble at court, he then walks out of a child's post-mortem. But can Burnside and Brind help him out?
| TBA | 73 | "It's Not Majorca" | Niall Leonard | Julian Jones | — | 12 September 1989 | Zohra Sehgal and Perry Benson |
Peters and Frazer are frustrated by two lay visitors from the Home Office inspecting the station. Thirteen prisoners are transferred to Sun Hill after a cell fire at Barton Street, adding to the chaos. Carver and Dashwood are attempting to investigate a case from an undercover van, only to find it is recognised by local youths on the estate. Brind finds a man sleeping in Brownlow's car. In 2021, actor Larry Dann (Sgt Alec Peters) and director Niall Leonard recorded a Zoom Commentary for this episode, released exclusively on Patreon.
| TBA | 74 | "Mending Fences" | Niall Leonard | Julian Jones | — | 14 September 1989 | Zohra Sehgal |
Follows from 'It's Not Majorca'. Peters is carpeted by Brownlow over the chaos presented to the lay visitors and is assigned to the vicar's fete. Stamp, Hollis and Melvin are also roped in to attending and are kept busy by a gang of juvenile delinquents. In 2021, actor Larry Dann (Sgt Alec Peters) and director Niall Leonard recorded a Zoom Commentary for this episode, released exclusively on Patreon.
| TBA | 75 | "Exit Lines" | Derek Lister | Brian Finch | First appearance of PC Norika Datta | 19 September 1989 | Barbara Durkin and Constance Chapman |
Garfield helps an elderly lady who claims items are disappearing from her apartment. Dashwood and Carver investigate a con man who sells a pigeon, which then returns to him.
| TBA | 76 | "That Old Malarkey" | Barry Davis | Julian Jones | — | 21 September 1989 | — |
Stamp responds to a noise complaint on his birthday, and finds the complainant is mentally unstable. He realises the security gate on the front door is locked and the incident becomes sinister.
| TBA | 77 | "Greig Versus Taylor" | Clive Fleury | Christopher Russell | — | 26 September 1989 | Derek Newark |
Greig interviews a suspect named Eric Taylor for armed robbery. The case is circumstantial, but he presses with scientific evidence until Taylor cracks. In 2020, actor Andrew Mackintosh (D.S. Alastair Greig) and writer Christopher Russell recorded a Zoom Commentary for this episode, released exclusively on Patreon.
| TBA | 78 | "Tottering" | Chris Lovett | Simon Moss | — | 28 September 1989 | Stephen Garlick and Perry Fenwick |
Able and Melvin catch a horse and cart abandoned in a street; a badly beaten man that might be the driver is found soon after. Hollis finds himself between a disaffected man who bought a used car and the dealer. Ackland and Martella have to free a woman trapped behind a superglued toilet door.
| TBA | 79 | "I Counted Them All Out" | Paul Harrison | Kieran Prendiville | — | 3 October 1989 | Count Prince Miller |
Burnside calls in the flying squad for assistance stopping a robbery. It's foiled and four men are arrested. The fifth is shot after threatening to set fire to a security guard. While the station celebrates the result, Carver has qualms about the shooting. Conway then informs the debrief that £15k has gone missing from the van targeted.
| TBA | 80 | "Zig Zag" | Chris Lovett | P. J. Hammond | — | 5 October 1989 | Jo Rowbottom and Roy Heather |
Dashwood and Lines hunt for a private detective. They realise they are in turn being followed, and more than one chase is being played out. In 2020, actor Jon Iles (DC Mike Dashwood) recorded an audio commentary for this episode, released exclusively on Patreon.
| TBA | 81 | "A Matter of Trust" | Derek Lister | Kieran Prendiville | — | 10 October 1989 | Tony O'Callaghan and Sharon Maiden |
Burnside faces a difficult choice regarding a security van robbery: pull his informants husband off the street before it happens and risk the rest of the gang getting cold feet, or fail to learn the location of the job and lose them all. Notes: Tony O'Callaghan would join the cast as Sgt Matt Boyden in 1991.
| TBA | 82 | "Tourist Trap" | Diana Patrick | Pete Dearsley | — | 12 October 1989 | David Ashton and Petra Markham |
Stamp, Carver, Garfield and Greig stake out a hotel while Ackland and Dashwood take a guided tour. Datta is called to a case of an amnesiac.
| TBA | 83 | "The One That Got Away" | David Attwood | Jonathan Rich | — | 17 October 1989 | — |
Brownlow is driving when he notices a car steering erratically. He stops the driver, but the tables are turned when he steals Brownlow's car. Roach recognises his description as his armed robbery informant. Brownlow joins Roach on the robbery operation, but Roach lets his informant escape. Ackland and Martella are on patrol when June is approached by a man who she met at a party. He gives her a bouquet of flowers and asks her on a date. She agrees, despite knowing he has a criminal past. They later see him being arrested.
| TBA | 84 | "Found Offending" | Eva Kolouchova | John Kershaw | — | 19 October 1989 | Caroline Milmoe and Tim Whitnall |
The relief struggle to deal with a myriad of everyday issues: Stamp tries to help a runaway begging under a bridge; Hollis is called to a woman attempting to knock down her neighbours fence; and Edwards attends a noise complaint at a cafe.
| TBA | 85 | "All Part of The Job" | Bren Simson | Colin Giffin | — | 24 October 1989 | Alun Lewis |
Brind catches the eye of a Special Branch detective after dealing with an argument in a pub. He uses Sun Hill to charge a criminal who has been on the run overseas for 19 years, but as their convoy of cars leave the station they are ambushed. Penny and Ackland look for a teenage runaway who has stolen drugs from her father's chemist shop.
| TBA | 86 | "In The Cold" | Graham Theakston | J. C. Wilsher | — | 26 October 1989 | — |
When a woman's body is found next to a disused train track, Burnside is convinced the night-watchman is responsible. When she is found to have died of natural causes, Carver accuses him of trying to frame the suspect.
| TBA | 87 | "Just a Little Runaround" | Eva Kolouchova | Richard Ireson | — | 31 October 1989 | Iain Rogerson and Dominic Mafham |
Frazer is assigned to police riot training. She freezes under pressure and is assessed as having failed.
| TBA | 88 | "A Fair Appraisal" | Nick Laughland | Garry Lyons | — | 2 November 1989 | Tessa Peake-Jones, Kenneth Farrington and David Sibley |
Edwards is in hot water over his performance and attitude. He gets in deeper bother when attending a troublesome warehouse alarm. After it's discovered there actually was a burglary this time he receives a complaint. Burnside follows a chain of drug supply back to its importation, only to find he has interfered in a Customs investigation. In 2020, actor Colin Blumenau (PC Taffy Edwards) and writer Garry Lyons recorded a Zoom Commentary for this episode, released exclusively on Patreon.
| TBA | 89 | "Visitors" | Clive Fleury | Kevin Clarke | — | 7 November 1989 | June Page, Andrew Robertson and Dennis Chinnery |
Lines needs to extend his overdraft to bury his mother. The open day at Sun Hill is ruined when a snooker trophy is stolen from Brownlow's office.
| TBA | 90 | "Private Wars" | Nicholas Prosser | Guy Meredith | — | 9 November 1989 | Prentis Hancock |
On his way to work, Burnside spots a trespasser going to burgle a power station only to find himself being assaulted and hospitalised by the security guards. He uses Lines to help get revenge. Hollis writes an article for the police federation newsletter which angers management. Edwards is touting blue videos round the station.
| TBA | 91 | "Feasting With Panthers" | Simon Cellan Jones | J. C. Wilsher | — | 14 November 1989 | — |
Penny is given a cigar for saving a shop owner from a ticket, angering the relief. Dashwood investigates a case of demanding money with menaces between ex-boyfriends.
| TBA | 92 | "By The Book" | Jeremy Silberston | John Milne | — | 16 November 1989 | Renu Setna and Michael Bilton |
Dashwood is suspicious when a young lady is able to purchase a large prescription of opiates as a registered addict with a private doctor, and she is later found beaten up and robbed. Fraser makes Able and Garfield role play taking statements.
| TBA | 93 | "Beer and Bicycles" | Nick Laughland | Christopher Russell | — | 21 November 1989 | Nigel Humphreys |
Able takes stick when he goes out on bicycle patrol, but ends up catching a woman driving a car used in an armed robbery. Conway finds alcohol hidden in the station but is stymied in his hunt for the culprits. Edwards goes for counselling and makes a big decision on his future. Martella is unconvinced by her liaison surgery, but it leads to information on a job. Stamp is frustrated, first by having Ackland as operator, then having to share the area car with the dog handler. The dog comes in useful though in apprehending the burglar from Viv's tip-off.
| TBA | 94 | "Grace of God" | David Hayman | Paddy Fletcher and Richard LeParmentier | — | 23 November 1989 | Douglas Henshall, Christopher Fairbank, Katherine Parr, Louis Mahoney and Shay Gorman |
Cryer deals with a former soldier who is squatting in his previous house, now purchased for a development. Stamp and Melvin evict a group of factory workers from a pub, only to find they have returned to the factory to continue the party.
| TBA | 95 | "Just Another Day" | Nicholas Prosser | J.C Martindale | — | 28 November 1989 | — |
Melvin brings in a saxophone player who could be a 20th century version of the Pied Piper. Brind deals with a lady going into labour who has been chased from her house by a savage dog owned by her husband.
| TBA | 96 | "Gone Fishing" | Nick Laughland | Jonathan Rich | — | 30 November 1989 | Harry Fowler |
Carver and Roach investigate a hit-and-run incident. Roach lies that a witness has come forward in order to get a confession from his suspect: the husband.
| TBA | 97 | "Early Bird" | Eva Kolouchova | Tom Needham | — | 5 December 1989 | — |
Lines and Carver suspect a man with no socks of committing a safe-breaking. Edwards and Brind bring in an old woman wandering the streets with a stuffed budgie in a cage who is known to Insp Frazer. Dashwood and Martella are stymied by two lads they believe to be stealing credit cards.
| TBA | 98 | "Just for the Crack" | Jeremy Silberston | Steve Trafford | — | 7 December 1989 | Alan Ford |
The relief investigate a spate of motorcycle thefts, including a police bike. Melvin has to tell two victims the Crown Prosecution Service will drop their case, and ends up arresting one who takes the news badly. Able delivers a death notice.
| TBA | 99 | "Woman in Brown" | Eva Kolouchova | Alan Clews | — | 12 December 1989 | Mark Greenstreet and Walter Sparrow |
Ackland and Melvin respond to a child abduction. Given a description of the woman who took the baby, June knows immediately who it is. When the furious father of the child finds out her address, June has to protect her. Lines and Carver stake out a bent car dealership, while Able and Martella pick up a conman.
| TBA | 100 | "Speaking Freely" | David Attwood | Gary Lyons | — | 14 December 1989 | — |
Frazer dispatches the relief to secure a lecture picketed by feminists. Meanwhile, she is given a negative assessment in her annual evaluation by Conway. She passionately defends herself to Brownlow, but he confirms he cannot recommend her for promotion to Chief Inspector. In 2020, actress Barbara Thorn (Insp Christine Frazer) and writer Garry Lyons recorded a Zoom Commentary for this episode, released exclusively on Patreon.
| TBA | 101 | "The Return of The Prodigal Son" | Keith Washington | John Kershaw | — | 19 December 1989 | Michael Graham Cox and Karl Johnson |
Greig has been made acting Detective Inspector in Burnside's absence, angering Roach. A wanted man returns from Belgium wanting to negotiate his surrender, claiming he is terminally ill. Hollis and Ford are picking up a drunk when a nearby house explodes. Greig links it to other arsons in the area, and discovers the attack is drugs related. Before he can act, the Drugs Squad arrives.
| TBA | 102 | "Chinese Whispers" | Julian Aymes | Christopher Russell | First appearances of PCs Phil Young and Dave Quinnan | 21 December 1989 | Michael Wisher |
Greig investigates the vicious mugging of a blind man; new arrival PC Quinnan nails a jewel thief; and Datta falls victim to a conman. Frazer reacts angrily to rumours circulating about a career move.
| TBA | 103 | "Powers of Exclusion" | Julian Aymes | J. C. Wilsher | — | 26 December 1989 | Norman Beaton |
After local crime boss Reverend Marcus Ogun is arrested in possession of an illegal sheath knife, Burnside seeks further evidence from his known associates. Meanwhile Cryer is under pressure to allow Ogun's solicitor access to her client. When the charge falls apart, Burnside isn't happy.
| TBA | 104 | "Saturday Night Fever" | Bren Simson | Edwin Pearce | Final appearance of WPC Claire Brind | 28 December 1989 | Gordon Salkilld and Clive Rowe |
Carver and Burnside investigate the murder of a drug dealer while Garfield and Brind bring in a teenage girl who has hit her mother.
