= A Friend in Need (disambiguation) =

A Friend in Need may refer to:

== Literature ==
- Friend in Need, a 1977 non-fiction book by Alison Prince
- A Friend in Need, a 1988 novel by Cathie Linz
- "A Friend in Need", a 1989 Elfquest short story by Mercedes Lackey
- A Friend in Need, a 2007 children's novel by Kathy Kacer; the fourth installment in the Margit series
- A Friend in Need, a 2013 book by Julia Jarman

== Television ==
- "Friend in Need", Barefoot Contessa season 2, episode 15 (2003)
- "Friend in Need", Penny on M.A.R.S. season 1, episode 4 (2018)
- "Friend in Need", Private Secretary season 2, episode 16 (1954)
- "Friend in Need", The Lone Ranger season 2, episodesl 25 (1951)
- "Friend in Need", The Restless Gun season 1, episode 17 (1958)
- "Friends in Need", All Saints season 6, episode 29 (2003)
- "A Friend in Need", Aaahh!!! Real Monsters season 4, episode 5b (1997)
- "A Friend in Need", Ace Lightning season 1, episode 17 (2003)
- "A Friend in Need", Avengers Assemble season 3, episode 15 (2016)
- "A Friend in Need", Big Bad Beetleborgs season 1, episode 29 (1996)
- "A Friend in Need", Bull (2016) season 5, episode 16 (2021)
- "A Friend in Need", Clifford the Big Red Dog season 2, episode 1b (2002)
- "A Friend in Need", Conan the Adventurer (1997) episode 5 (1997)
- "A Friend in Need", Dixon of Dock Green series 11, episode 13 (1964)
- "A Friend in Need", Doctors (2000) series 2, episode 13 (2000)
- "A Friend in Need", Doctors (2000) series 6, episode 39 (2004)
- "A Friend in Need", Don't Call Me Charlie! episode 4 (1962)
- "A Friend in Need", Fame (1982) season 3, episode 19 (1984)
- "A Friend in Need", Father Knows Best season 4, episode 27 (1958)
- "A Friend in Need", Ghostbusters (1986) episode 13 (1986)
- "A Friend in Need", Good Times season 4, episode 18 (1977)
- "A Friend in Need", He-Man and the Masters of the Universe season 1, episode 10 (1983)
- "A Friend in Need", Holby City series 5, episode 49 (2003)
- "A Friend in Need", Holby City series 18, episode 25 (2016)
- "A Friend in Need", Jamie Johnson series 4, episode 29 (2019)
- "A Friend in Need", Kana Kaanum Kaalangal season 1, episode 74 (2022)
- "A Friend in Need", Keep It in the Family (1980) series 1, episode 6 (1980)
- "A Friend in Need", Kidd Video season 2, episode 11 (1985)
- "A Friend in Need", Lol Salaam episode 4 (2021)
- "A Friend in Need", Mighty Morphin Power Rangers season 3, episodes 1–3 (1995)
- "A Friend in Need...", Ralph & Katie episode 1 (2022)
- "A Friend in Need", Road to Avonlea season 5, episode 4 (1994)
- "A Friend in Need", Space Cases season 2, episode 13 (1997)
- "A Friend in Need", Spin City season 6, episode 22 (2002)
- "A Friend in Need", Star Wars: The Clone Wars season 4, episode 14 (2012)
- "A Friend in Need", Survivors (1975) series 2, episode 7 (1976)
- "A Friend in Need", That Girl season 2, episode 16 (1967)
- "A Friend in Need", The Adventures of Ozzie and Harriet season 9, episode 8 (1960)
- "A Friend in Need", The Adventures of the Black Stallion season 1, episode 15 (1990)
- "A Friend in Need", The Aphrodite Inheritance episode 4 (1979)
- "A Friend in Need", The Big House episode 3 (2004)
- "A Friend in Need", The Bill series 1, episode 2 (1984)
- "A Friend in Need", The Hidden Room season 1, episode 6 (1991)
- "A Friend in Need", The Jeffersons season 1, episode 1 (1975)
- "A Friend in Need", The King Kong Show episode 1a (1966)
- "A Friend in Need", The Rifleman season 4, episode 13 (1961)
- "A Friend in Need", The Upper Hand season 2, episode 9 (1991)
- "A Friend in Need", Thomas & Friends series 6, episode 8 (2002)
- "A Friend in Need", Three's Company season 6, episode 18 (1982)
- "A Friend in Need", Too Close for Comfort season 1, episode 10 (1981)
- "A Friend in Need", Traders season 3, episode 18 (1998)
- "A Friend in Need", Watch My Chops season 1, episode 22 (2003)
- "A Friend in Need", Webster season 3, episode 19 (1986)
- "A Friend in Need", Wicked Science series 2, episode 5 (2005)
- "A Friend in Need", Working Girl episode 3 (1990)
- "A Friend in Need", Worzel Gummidge Down Under series 1, episode 10 (1987)
- "A Friend in Need: Part 1", Xena: Warrior Princess season 6, episode 21 (2001)
- "A Friend in Need: Part 2", Xena: Warrior Princess season 6, episode 22 (2001)
- "Fred's Friend in Need", The Flintstone Comedy Show season 2, episode 7 (1981)
- "The Friend in Need", Bones season 8, episode 16 (2013)
- "The Friend in Need", For Your Love season 5, episode 3 (2093)

== Other uses ==
- A Friend in Need, one of the paintings in the Dogs Playing Poker series

== See also ==
- "A Friend in Deed", episode 18 of the second season of My Little Pony: Friendship Is Magic
- A Friend Indeed: The Bill Sackter Story, a 2008 documentary film
- Friends In Deed, a New York City-based non-profit organization
