= Trevor Martin =

British actor (1929–2017)

- Born: Trevor Gordon Martin; 17 November 1929; Edinburgh, Scotland
- Died: 5 October 2017 (aged 87); Sofia, Bulgaria
- Occupation: Actor

Trevor Gordon Martin (17 November 1929 – 5 October 2017) was a British stage and film character actor. He was known for work in the Doctor Who universe. He played the Doctor on stage, a time lord on TV and other small parts for a radio play and an audio dramatisation. Martin had numerous television credits and acted in the films Othello (1965), Absolution (1978), Krull (1983), The House of Mirth (2000), and Babel (2006).

== Early life and education ==
Martin was born in Edinburgh and raised in Enfield, London. After military service, he trained at the Guildhall School of Music and Drama, where he won the Carleton Hobbs Radio Award in 1953 and went to began his career with the BBC Radio Drama Company.

== Career ==
=== Theatre ===
Martin was known for playing the Doctor on stage at the Adelphi Theatre, London in Doctor Who and the Daleks in the Seven Keys to Doomsday based on the popular television series Doctor Who. In the 1974 play, he essayed the role of an alternate Fourth Doctor, a role he reprised in a 2008 audio adaptation of the play from Big Finish Productions.

=== Television ===
Martin appeared in Doctor Who as a Time Lord in the 1969 serial The War Games opposite Second Doctor Patrick Troughton and later guest starred in the 1993 Doctor Who radio play The Paradise of Death alongside the Third Doctor, Jon Pertwee and the 2003 Doctor Who audio drama Flip-Flop alongside Seventh Doctor Sylvester McCoy.

Martin had numerous television credits from the 1960s, including Sherlock Holmes, Jackanory, Van der Valk, Z-Cars, Special Branch, The Onedin Line, Coronation Street, Inspector Morse and The Bill. He also appeared as Mr Giddings in an episode of Call the Midwife.

=== Film ===
His films included Othello (1965), Absolution (1978), Krull (1983), The House of Mirth (2000), and Babel (2006).

== Personal life and death ==
Martin was married twice. He first married Janet Moreton, they later divorced. He then married actress Hermione Gregory. He had four children from his first marriage; his son Sandy Martin was a UK Member of Parliament. Martin died on 5 October 2017 at the age of 87, while on holiday in Bulgaria.

== Filmography ==
=== Television ===
Year	Title	Role	Notes
1962	Z-Cars	Mr. Higgins	Episode: "People's Property"
1964	Z-Cars	Woolf	Episode: "The Dark Side of the Road"
1965	Sherlock Holmes	Duncan Ross	Episode: "The Red-Headed League"
1966	Play of the Week	Guy I, Count of Ponthieu	Episode: "A Choice of Kings"
1966	Coronation Street	Det. Constable Rodgers	1 episode
1967	Jackanory	Storyteller	Episodes: "Pinocchio", "Five Golden Guineas", "The Money Tree", "Out of the Frying Pan...", "The Giant Dog Fish"
1967	The Troubleshooters	Colin Maddox	Episode: "Mr. Know-How"
1969	Play of the Month	Artemidorus	Episode: "Julius Caesar"
1969	Doctor Who	Time Lord	Episode: "The War Games"
1969	Z-Cars	Joe Andrews	Episode: "From Information Received: Part 1"
1969	Z-Cars	Joe Andrews	Episode: "From Information Received: Part 2"
1969	The Wednesday Play	Steward	Episode: "Blood of the Lamb"
1970	Z-Cars	Frank Pearson	Episode: "By Bread Alone: Part 1"
1970	Z-Cars	Frank Pearson	Episode: "By Bread Alone: Part 2"
1972	Van der Valk	Patrolman	Episode: "Destroying Angel"
1973	Z-Cars	Fuller	Episode: "Invention"
1973	Special Branch	Bomb Disposal Officer	Episode: "Red Herring"
1979	The Onedin Line	Captain Summers	Episode: "Running Free"
1979	Prince Regent	Thomas Denman	Episode: "Defeat...and Victory"
1980	Armchair Thriller: The Circe Complex	Tom Foreman	TV serial
1982	Bird of Prey	Chambers	TV serial
1984	Coronation Street	Arthur Whittaker	13 episodes
1984	The Bill	The Stranger	Episode: "A Dangerous Breed"
1989	Inspector Morse	Porter	Episode: "Ghost in the Machine"
1990	Inspector Morse	Alan Sowden	Episode: "The Sins of the Fathers"
1997	Ain't Misbehavin'	Group Captain	1 episode
1998	The Bill	Harry Bennett	Episode: "All the Lonely People"
2003	The Bill	Roy Abercrombie	Episode: "Security Risk"
2013	Call the Midwife	Mr Giddings	1 episode

=== Film ===
Year	Title	Role	Notes
1965	Othello		
1978	Absolution	Mr. Gladstone	
1983	Krull	The Beast	voice
1987	Three Kinds of Heat	Haggard	
2000	The House of Mirth	Jennings, the Butler	
2006	Babel	Douglas	
2014	Patch Town	Man at the Mall	

== Theatre ==
Date	Title	Role	Director	Company / Theatre
1963 –	The Provoked Wife	Sir John Brute	Toby Robertson	Prospect Theatre Company / Georgian Theatre Royal in Richmond, North Yorkshire
–	The Provoked Wife	Sir John Brute	Toby Robertson	Prospect Theatre Company / Vaudeville Theatre, London
3 May 1977 –	State of Revolution	Minister	Christopher Morahan	National Theatre / Birmingham Repertory Theatre
18 May 1977 –	State of Revolution	Minister	Christopher Morahan	National Theatre / Lyttelton Theatre

== Radio ==
Trevor Martin played the part of Reuben Starkadder in BBC Radio 4's 1981 production of Stella Gibbons' novel Cold Comfort Farm.
