= Woodentop (Storyboard) =

- Storyboard episode
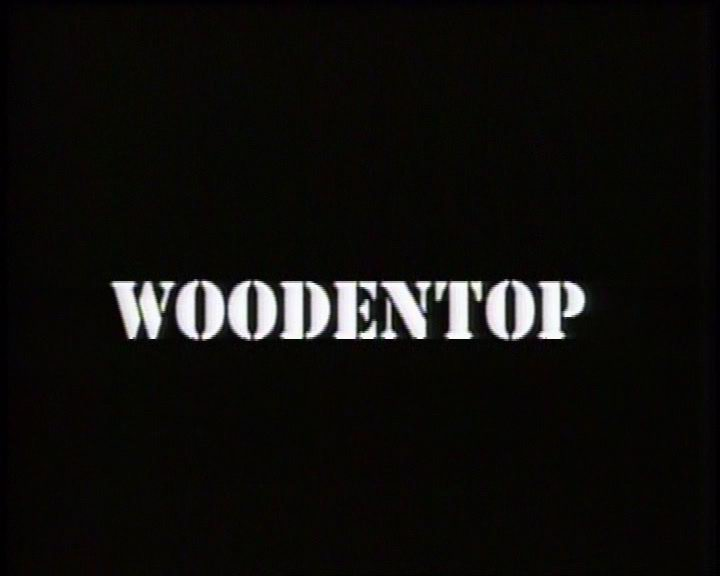
- Opening title card
- Directed by: Peter Cregeen
- Written by: Geoff McQueen
- Original air date: 16 August 1983
- Running time: 50 minutes

"Woodentop" is an episode of the Thames Television series Storyboard, which comprises a series of one-off plays on different themes. The episode was originally broadcast on 16 August 1983. Woodentop became the first ever episode in the long-running British police television series The Bill. The name woodentop is a colloquialism for beat policemen who traditionally wear helmets; the nickname is itself an allusion to the Children's TV series The Woodentops.

== Plot ==
Jim Carver reports for duty at Sun Hill police station.

Jim Carver's first foot patrol, alongside June Ackland.

The episode documents PC Jim Carver's first day at Sun Hill Police Station, during which he is partnered with experienced WPC June Ackland. It isn't specified how long Ackland has been at Sun Hill but, even at that point, it appears to have been substantial, because she is highly respected.

The day is an eventful one: the pair's first assignment together leads them to discovering the decomposing body of a woman in her bath. Later, whilst on patrol, Jim encounters a rude youngster (Gary Hailes) and, influenced by comments made by older officers at the station, decides to clip him round the ear. That action results in Carver receiving a reprimand from Sergeant Wilding. However, the boy's father approves of his son's treatment, so no further action is taken. June Ackland and Dave Litten have been in an on-again off-again relationship and, whenever they cross paths, both tend to go silent, making other members of their relief uncomfortable. Sergeant Wilding advises Ackland to drop Litten, saying that she can do better. PC Reg Hollis is mentioned in the episode. Although not appearing on screen, an attempt is made to contact him by radio. When he fails to answer the call, the officers in the station make the assumption that he has wandered out of radio range.

== Production ==
Thames Television transmitted Woodentop as part of its Storyboard anthology series of one-off dramas. It was written by Geoff McQueen, a writer who had genre experience after writing episodes of LWT's The Gentle Touch. Woodentop stood out from run of the mill police dramas of the time for a number of reasons including the use of hand-held cameras and natural lighting as well as the use of realistic-sounding dialogue. The show created a realistic portrayal of modern-day policing, and there was nothing like it on television at the time, a fact which was actively exploited by the programme's makers.

=== Production errors ===
There are mistakes made in some of the uniforms the cast wore during the episode. For example, in one scene, PC Dave Litten is on foot patrol with PC Jim Carver, and PC Litten's helmet has GR on the helmet badge where it should have had ER, the same that was on PC Carver's helmet. Also the tunics the male officers wore had notched lapels with buttoned down epaulettes, whereas they should have just had peaked lapels and the epaulette's insignia placed on the shoulder of the tunic as this is what the Metropolitan Police wore at the time.

== Inconsistencies with The Bill ==
"Woodentop" has an unusual place in the history of The Bill due to the original premise of this being a one-off play. After broadcast, Thames commissioned a full series to be shown the following year, under the name The Bill as the show had the potential to appeal to a mass audience. Although The Bill is clearly a continuation from this episode, the main series contradicts it in a number of ways. For instance, in Woodentop Litten has completed his secondment to CID and is close to securing his place in the detective branch, whereas in The Bill he does not gain his CID secondment until halfway through Series One. In addition many central characters in "Woodentop" – such as Sergeant Wilding and Inspector Deeping – vanish between the pilot and the series. Deeping does gain one mention in Series One, in the episode "It's Not Such a Bad Job After All", where Ackland is informed that he is coming to meet her on the scene of a suicide – a later radio transmission, however, reports that Sgt. Bob Cryer is to meet her instead. Although Wilding is not mentioned following Woodentop, he shares several characteristics with Sgt. Cryer – including a position as the "father figure" of the Sun Hill relief, and an apparently tumultuous relationship with Roy Galloway, whom both Cryer and Wilding refer to as a "bloody superstar". In the first episode of Series One, "Funny Ol' Business – Cops and Robbers", Galloway and Cryer make apparent reference to the events of Woodentop in regards to Jim Carver. Galloway suggests that it is Cryer who requested the favour, further suggesting that Cryer and Wilding are in fact the one character, and that, like PC Taffy Morgan (later Taffy Edwards), Jack Wilding's name has merely been changed to Bob Cryer. There are also discrepancies with the naming of some of the characters. In the 2003 live episode of The Bill, made to celebrate the twentieth anniversary of broadcast, Carver and Ackland discuss events from the pilot, whereupon Carver incorrectly refers to the character of Taffy by the surname Morgan, a name that was dropped for the series proper in favour of "Edwards".

=== Cast changes ===
Only four of the cast of "Woodentop" would go on to be regulars in the main series of The Bill: Mark Wingett, Trudie Goodwin, Gary Olsen and Colin Blumenau, while a number of characters were re-cast, including Roy Galloway.

== Production team ==
- Written by Geoff McQueen
- Technical Adviser Barry Appleton
- Produced by Michael Chapman
- Directed by Peter Cregeen

== Cast ==
- PC Jim Carver – Mark Wingett
- PC Dave Litten – Gary Olsen
- PC "Taffy" Morgan – Colin Blumenau
- Duty PC – Richard Huw
- WPC June Ackland – Trudie Goodwin
- Sgt. Jack Wilding – Peter Dean
- Duty Sgt. – Chris Jenkinson
- DI Roy Galloway – Robert Pugh
- Insp. Sam Deeping – Jon Croft
- Reg Taylor – Gary Hailes
- George Taylor – Colin McCormack
- Winston Summers – Paul McKenzie
- First Neighbour – Dawn Perllman
- Second Neighbour – Maryann Turner
- Caretaker – Derek Parkes
