= The Bill series 4 =

The Bill
- Series 4
- Series 4 Australian DVD cover
- No. of episodes: 48

Release
- Original network: ITV
- Original release: 19 July – 29 December 1988

Series chronology
- ← Previous; Series 3 Next → Series 5

The fourth series of The Bill, a British television drama, consists of forty-eight episodes, broadcast between 19 July and 29 December 1988. This series was the first to adopt a half-hour format, and the theme tune had its first of several updates. The making of every episode broadcast in 1988 is covered in the guidebook Witness Statements: Making The Bill, featuring in-depth interviews with 60 cast and crew, production notes, locations, viewing figures and rare behind-the-scenes photographs.

== DVD releases ==
The series was first released on DVD on 4 December 2006 in Australia, incorrectly packaged as Seasons 4 and 5, when in fact the set only contained the entire series four. The series was later issued in four separate volumes in the United Kingdom, available on 30 June 2008, 2 March 2009, 11 May 2009 and 15 March 2010. It was later reissued in Australia on 31 August 2011. The above DVD artwork is taken from the most recent Australian release. It features an image of DS Ted Roach. The British volume artwork features a variety of collage images featuring characters from across the season. The original Australian box set features a sole image of Ds Ted Roach

== Cast changes ==
=== Arrivals ===
- PC Tony Stamp
- Insp Christine Frazer
- SRO Marion Layland
- DI Frank Burnside
- PC Malcolm Haynes
- Ch Insp Derek Conway
- PC Pete Ramsey
- WPC Claire Brind
- WPC Suzanne Ford
- DC Tosh Lines

=== Departures ===
- None

== Episodes ==
No. overall	No. in series	Title	Directed by	Written by	Episode notes	Original release date	Guest(s)
TBA	1	"Light Duties"	Derek Lister	Geoff McQueen	First appearances of Insp Christine Frazer, PC Malcolm Haynes and SRO Marion Layland, first credited appearance of PC Tony Stamp, PC Jim Carver is promoted to DC	19 July 1988	Andy Secombe
Recently transferred to CID, Carver faces his first case when he and Roach are called to investigate the murder of an informant. Roach, however, is appalled when Scotland Yard suddenly take over the investigation and fears there is more to this case than meets the eye. He manages to persuade Carver to help him conduct his own investigation. Is he leading Carver into trouble? Meanwhile, Tony Stamp, who makes his debut as a regular cast member in this episode, gets off to a bad start with the station's new inspector, Christine Frazer. Brownlow tries to find a replacement for DI Galloway.
TBA	2	"The Three Wise Monkeys"	Bill Brayne	Geoff McQueen	First appearance of Ch Insp Derek Conway	21 July 1988	Nick Brimble and Tom Owen
An armed robber hijacks a car and after a chase begins, shooting at Yorkie, Ackland, and three specialist officers. One of the specialists returns fire in contravention of at least two guidelines, narrowly missing Yorkie who floors him with a punch but is persuaded not to make an official complaint. Meanwhile, two officers from another station arrive at Sun Hill to transfer a prisoner. Tom Penny starts to suffer the psychological effects of his shooting in series 3. Also, Derek Conway arrives at Sun Hill.
TBA	3	"Good Will Visit"	William Brayne	Barry Appleton	First appearance of PC Pete Ramsey	26 July 1988	Malcolm Kaye and Osaze Ehibor
PC Pete Ramsey has a history of bad police work and gambling debts. He has been transferred to Sun Hill for cheating at cards. Ramsey manages to upset most of the station, especially Ch Insp Conway who believes Ramsey to be a bent copper. He is proved right as Ramsey looks set to ruin his own career. Sgt Peters and PC Haynes arrest a group of navy personnel for trashing a pub. Conway receives a call from the Ministry of Defence telling him that half of those arrested are due on an important exercise the next day. Meanwhile, Carver and Dashwood arrest a pair of Chinese crooks who they believe have a van full of drugs but which turns out to be the expensive spice saffron which was stolen from a previous burglary in Suffolk.
TBA	4	"Home Sweet Home"	Gareth Davies	Nicholas McInerny	—	28 July 1988	Christian Rodska and John Bowe
Sun Hill evict squatters from a number of houses, leading to a lot of people becoming homeless. Yorkie befriends Marie Tucker, a single mother who is struggling to make ends meet. Marie goes to Councillor Thomas's home to try and get rehomed. Yorkie tries to save her and her children but a mother's desperation to protect her children soon ends in tragedy. In 2020, writer Nicholas McInerny and floor manager Julian Meers recorded a Video Commentary for this episode, released exclusively on Patreon.
TBA	5	"All in Good Faith"	Gareth Davies	Barry Appleton	—	2 August 1988	Leslie Schofield
The discovery of a gun that was used in an armed robbery five years previously reopens the investigation into local gangster Pat Duffy. Roach has been trying to nail Duffy for years and jumps at the chance to lead the investigation. However, Conway intervenes because the gun was handed in as part of an amnesty.
TBA	6	"Just Call Me Guvnor"	Brian Parker	Geoff McQueen	First regular appearance of DI Frank Burnside	4 August 1988	Russell Lewis
Frank Burnside arrives to take over Sun Hill CID. He takes charge of an undercover operation to nail a gang of ruthless football supporters. Meanwhile, Cryer isn't happy that Burnside is at Sun Hill because he believes him to be a corrupt officer but discovers he is mistaken after obtaining information from Inspector Frazer.
TBA	7	"Caught Red Handed"	Derek Lister	Barry Appleton	—	9 August 1988	—
When Carver spots Yorkie having a secret meeting with a drug dealer in a pub, he and Burnside are convinced he's got himself involved in drugs. When confronted, Yorkie admits that they were steroids to improve his condition for his rugby. He escapes serious problems because taking the drugs is not illegal but promises Brownlow that he will not take them again. CID raid the drug dealer's flat.
TBA	8	"Homes and Gardens"	Derek Lister	Christopher Russell	—	11 August 1988	Mark Monero, Brian Peck, Desmond Cullum-Jones and Aidan Gillen
Yorkie takes a sympathetic interest in Mickey Cozen, a man with the mental age of 7 whom he has arrested. Inspector Frazer ask him to take them home, after deciding not to charge Mickey. On arrival, Mickey and his father start arguing and Mickey knocks Yorkie out. The father then bundles Yorkie and his son into the car and abducts them. In 2021, actor Ashley Gunstock, writer Christopher Russell and script editor Tim Vaughan recorded a Video Commentary for this episode, released exclusively on Patreon.
TBA	9	"Country Cousin"	Sharon Miller	Barry Appleton	—	16 August 1988	—
DS Jarvis, a country copper, arrives in Sun Hill and works with Burnside to arrest a wanted man who has moved to Sun Hill to escape the local police. Burnside has his work cut out as Jarvis assaults the criminal and causes an affray at a seedy strip club. In 2019, costume designer Jennie Tate recorded an audio commentary for this episode, released exclusively on Patreon.
TBA	10	"Alarms and Embarrassments"	Sharon Miller	Christopher Russell	—	18 August 1988	Jeff Rawle and Alison Bettles (credited as Alison Beetles)
Yorkie and Dashwood investigate an armed robbery at an off licence. Dashwood and Roach go to arrest a suspect but realise that he is obviously not their man. Frazer holds an identification parade for an old lady who is unable to identify the suspect. In 2021, writer Christopher Russell and script editor Tim Vaughan recorded a Zoom Commentary for this episode, released exclusively on Patreon.
TBA	11	"Stealing Cars and Nursery Rhymes"	Paul Harrison	Julian Jones	—	23 August 1988	Tom Cotcher and Patsy Smart
Yorkie volunteers to do some work at a youth club, a decision he will later regret when he is forced to deal with a gang of vicious teenagers who go joyriding in a flash car; it ends in tragedy. Ramsey is plagued by a stray dog that follows him. Notes: Tom Cotcher would join the cast as DC Alan Woods in 1992. In 2021 actor Robert Hudson (PC Yorkie Smith) and director Paul Harrison recorded a Zoom Commentary for this episode, released exclusively on Patreon.
TBA	12	"Hold Fire"	Paul Harrison	Barry Appleton	—	25 August 1988	Walter Sparrow
A fatal traffic accident leaves Yorkie in hospital. CID discover a big-time gangster who got caught up in the accident had explosives in his car. Whilst in hospital an associate comes and removes him from under the noses of Sun Hill Officers.
TBA	13	"Bad Faith"	Frank Smith	Julian Jones	—	30 August 1988	—
CID attempt to find a burglar on a dangerous estate, with serious ramifications for Dashwood's car. Uniform deal with two kids whose parents have overdosed. In 2021, director Frank W. Smith recorded a Zoom Commentary for this episode, released exclusively on Patreon.
TBA	14	"Requiem"	Sharon Miller	Peter J. Hammond	First episode to not feature Sun Hill Police Station within the episode	1 September 1988	Richard Beale and Ronald Leigh-Hunt
When human remains are discovered in a sub-divided Victorian townhouse, CID launch a hunt for the former occupants of the flat where it was discovered.
TBA	15	"Trespasses"	Brian Parker	Christopher Russell	First appearance of WPC Claire Brind	6 September 1988	Alex McAvoy and Terence Beesley
When Ramsey discovers a newborn baby dumped in a communal rubbish bin, he rushes her to hospital. Meanwhile, CID investigate a spate of thefts at a church.
TBA	16	"Save the Last Dance For Me"	Brian Farnham	Barry Appleton	—	8 September 1988	—
CID are alerted that an escaped convict may arrive in Sun Hill to see his girlfriend. A major operation is set up, commanded by Conway. It provides two surprising arrests; Carver nicks a teen for stealing a VW emblem from a car, and Dashwood and Ackland lift a jealous husband who attacks Dashwood for dancing with his wife.
TBA	17	"Runaround"	Derek Lister	Al Hunter	First credited appearance of WPC Suzanne Ford	13 September 1988	John Challis, Linda Robson and Eve Karpf
Smith is down after a dry spell of results, but an innocuous encounter with an agoraphobic old lady leads to three arrests – two brothers for burglary and a drunken bus driver who has smashed up his depot.
TBA	18	"The Trap"	Brian Farnham	Jonathan Rich	—	15 September 1988	—
CID attempt to bring down known villains by leaving an open van packed with video recorders on the streets of Sun Hill; Dashwood and Roach arrest a man who removes one of the machines and discover he is Julian Pembridge, a corrupt solicitor and an old adversary of Burnside's.
TBA	19	"Community Relations"	Frank Smith	Christopher Russell	—	20 September 1988	—
Brownlow is on leave and Conway attends a council meeting. Yorkie makes an arrest, but the suspect is high on drugs and collapses and dies before he is processed. The station is besieged by angry friends of the deceased, but his father blames the drug dealers rather than the police. Melvin and Ramsey are on an observation in a shed. In 2021, writer Christopher Russell, script editor Tim Vaughan and director Frank W. Smith recorded a Zoom Commentary, released exclusively on Patreon.
TBA	20	"A Dog's Life"	Brian Parker	Graeme Curry	—	22 September 1988	—
A theft at a library and investigations concerning a spate of fly tipping take place. The return from Manchester of Archie, a well-known petty crook, links the two. Edwards tries to interest the relief in an investment in a greyhound.
TBA	21	"Trouble and Strife"	Brian Parker	Julian Jones	—	27 September 1988	Brian Capron
Ramsey and Haynes attend a domestic incident where an abusive husband is still on the premises. The call ends with both husband and wife being arrested for criminal damage and assault.
TBA	22	"Running Late"	Sharon Miller	John Milne	—	29 September 1988	—
Brind makes an enemy of Burnside when she gets in the way of a CID operation; after finding a teenage runaway, she is suspicious about the girl and her family so she decides to investigate, leading to more trouble for Burnside. Burnside successfully foils an armed security van robbery.
TBA	23	"They Say We're Rough"	Frank W. Smith	Douglas Watkinson	—	4 October 1988	—
Melvin and Martella are shopping in an army surplus shop but believe it may be stocked with stolen goods. Roach and Carver arrest the supplier on suspicion of theft. When two Redcaps (military police) arrive in Sun Hill to collect the suspect, Cryer discovers that they have abused the prisoner.
TBA	24	"Blue for a Boy"	Paul Harrison	John Foster	—	6 October 1988	Gerry Cowper and Robert Glenister
When a young baby is kidnapped by a mystery man, CID turn their attentions to the baby's mother Brenda, who appears to have something to hide. Burnside pushes Brenda to the truth and the man's identity is revealed: Sam Rice, a surrogate father. In 2021, director Paul Harrison and script editor Tim Vaughan recorded a Zoom Commentary for this episode, released exclusively on Patreon.
TBA	25	"Chasing the Dragon"	Frank W. Smith	Brendan J. Cassin	—	11 October 1988	Terry Sue-Patt
DS Roach spots a drug deal taking place on the Rochester Estate, but he, Carver and Dashwood fail to catch the dealers. PC Haynes and PC Ramsey spot the escaping car in their panda and give chase, but the dealers' car hits a little girl before crashing into a skip. Haynes loses one of the suspects when obstructed by some punks, but the driver of the car, Mickey Squire, is arrested. With Burnside on leave, Ch Insp Conway allows Ramsey and Haynes to continue with the case. Ramsey is pleased as he thinks it may get him back into CID. He and Haynes play good-cop/bad-cop to get a confession, and Haynes goes undercover at a party to find the escaped passenger and the main drug supplier. CID raid the supplier's luxurious apartment and discover a huge amount of drugs and stolen goods in his garage. PC Melvin and WPC Brind attend a fracas at a laundrette. Melvin slips on some soap, leaving Brind to take charge.
TBA	26	"The Coop"	Graham Theakston	Garry Lyons	—	13 October 1988	—
PC Edwards and WPC Ackland are on their lunch break, and they warn a man for flying a model helicopter too close to the road. They then investigate a terrible smell coming from a nearby property, and discover a shed full of the carcasses of battery hens. The smell is making Edwards sick, and he wants to get out and report it to the RSPCA. As he and Ackland are leaving, they are taken hostage by the deranged shed-owner armed with a shotgun. Sgt Peters goes to look for them after dealing with the model helicopter crashing into a house. Sgt Peters, PC Stamp and PC Melvin dive for cover as the man starts firing his gun, but he is overpowered and arrested. Writer Garry Lyons and actors Colin Blumenau (PC Taffy Edwards), Trudie Goodwin (WPC June Ackland) and Larry Dann (Sgt Alec Peters) recorded a Zoom Commentary for this episode, released on Patreon.
TBA	27	"The Quick and the Dead"	Philip Casson	Christopher Russell	—	18 October 1988	John Rolfe
Sgt Peters attends a physical fitness evaluation but does not do too well. PC Ramsey and PC Frank give chase when they witness a robbery. The robbers escape, but they manage to nick the driver, who insists his car was hijacked. Ramsey interrogates the boy, but Ch Insp Conway intervenes when Ramsey's heavy-handed approach becomes apparent. Conway releases the boy when he admits he was on his way to a job interview – as a male stripper. WPC Ackland investigates the theft of a cat's gravestone, and finds it in the elderly cat-owner's rest home. A corpse goes missing when an undertaker's van is stolen by yobs, but PC Melvin tracks it down. Ramsey is giving everyone else a hard time about their fitness tests as he thinks he's the fittest guy at the station, but when it comes to his test, he cannot sit it due to high blood pressure. Writer Christopher Russell, script editor Tim Vaughan and actor Ashley Gunstock (PC Robin Frank) recorded a Zoom Commentary for this episode, released on Patreon.
TBA	28	"Witness"	Graham Theakston	Christopher Russell	—	20 October 1988	—
PC Ramsey and PC Smith are looking after a witness in a court case. Ramsey is amused that the witness, Andrew Pike, has a high opinion of the police and is applying to become a special constable. Ramsey gets bored at the flat, and convinces Pike to have a day out at the dog races. At the track, Ramsey throws a drunk out of the toilets, and Pike takes offence to his handling of the situation and threatens to report him. Smith goes to get a cuppa and Ramsey is watching the race. Pike disappears, and they manage to rescue him just in time. PC Edwards is in court, testifying in the case of an assault on a woman. His notes end up in the toilet and the case is dismissed as not proven. In 2022, actors Colin Blumenau (Taffy), Robert Hudson (Yorkie) and Nick Reding (Ramsey), writer Christopher Russell and script editor Tim Vaughan recorded a Video Commentary for this episode, released exclusively on Patreon.
TBA	29	"Here We Go Loopy Lou"	Brian Farnham	Julian Jones	—	25 October 1988	—
Bob, Claire and Taffy investigate the report of a man carrying a cross which is found hanging from a crane. They come across a lady driving a car with a small white dog on her knee which is knocked down by a truck after escaping from the car. Taffy swims across a canal after a religious nutter who tries to strangle Bob while thinking he is Christ.
TBA	30	"Stop And Search"	Terry Marcel	Geoff McQueen	First appearance of DC Tosh Lines	27 October 1988	—
Sgt Cryer introduces two special constables who will be joining the relief: Mary Kilnair and Ronnie Defoe. While on patrol with PC Edwards, Kilnair is pricked by a junkie's needle; there is grave concern she may have been infected. A man arrives at the station to confess to the murder of his wife – thirty years previously. DC Carver and new DC Tosh Lines investigate. A lawyer meets with the station top brass (Brownlow, Conway and Frazer) to discuss her client's claim of being stopped and searched thirteen times in two weeks. Lines recognises the MO from his last nick – several black men giving the same name and address whenever they are stopped by police. DS Roach asks Insp Frazer out on a date, but Burnside finds out and makes fun of him.
TBA	31	"Spook Stuff"	Terry Marcel	Geoff McQueen	—	1 November 1988	Andrew McCulloch and Daniel Peacock
WPC Martella and PC Stamp take an American woman who has been caught shoplifting into custody. She is very insistent that the police contact her husband who is staying in a hotel. The husband, meanwhile, is reporting the theft of his briefcase from their hotel room. DI Burnside is warned off the case by a Special Branch officer and a CIA agent, who are waiting for the man to sell top-secret papers. DS Roach is having money troubles, but when one of his snouts offers to sell him the secret documents, Roach and Burnside use the situation to clear up Roach's debt problem. Roach is furious when Burnside double-crosses his snout and the papers are returned to the Americans.
TBA	32	"Evacuation"	Terry Green	Edwin Peace	—	2 November 1988	Matthew Scurfield, Eddie Tagoe and Jim McManus
It's a busy day on the station front desk, and PC Smith fails to notice that someone has left a hold-all next to the desk. When it is discovered, Insp Frazer orders the station evacuated as a safety measure while the bomb squad is called in. Sgt Cryer and WPC Martella have trouble getting a violent female prisoner into and out of her cell. DC Dashwood winds Smith up about not noticing the bag, and he conducts an interview with a suspect in a car. PC Edwards is acting oddly, arguing with WPC Ackland and he keeps returning to the station looking for something. SO13 find an incendiary device in the bag, but it explodes, blinding an SO13 officer.
TBA	33	"Personal Imports"	Brian Farnham	Kevin Clarke	Some scenes were filmed at Grenfell Tower and immediate surrounding areas, such as Barandon Walk.	8 November 1988	Paul O'Grady (credited as Paul Savage)
PC Melvin sees a chemist being robbed, but he has powder thrown in his face and the thieves escape. DC Carver is conducting an obbo in the house of a lonely, amorous woman. He spots what looks like a drug exchange and pursues the car, but is told to relinquish the pursuit to the drugs squad from the Yard. WPC Martella investigates a truancy case, where 14-year-old Turkish boy Omir is being looked after by his cousin "Auntie". DS Roach is pushed over in a public toilet by a man picked up by another bloke. He gets a tip-off from his transvestite snout, Roxanne, about a local barmaid running rent-boys in the area. Martella recognises the address as that of her missing Turkish boy, and she and Roach raid the flat and arrest Auntie.
TBA	34	"Paper Chase"	Niall Leonard	Barry Appleton	—	10 November 1988	Christine Kavanagh and Sally Faulkner
A schoolgirl has been abducted, and D.I. Burnside is determined to find her. The girl's father is reluctant to have the police involved, as the kidnappers have threatened to kill his daughter if the police are called. He gets £500,000 out of his company account to pay the ransom. A technical officer from the Yard is called in to bug the briefcase. CID wait and watch with binoculars, and after a decoy run, the father makes the drop. Immediately, Burnside and his team raid the premises, but there is no one there and the briefcase is empty. The little girl turns up at home safe. Burnside smells a rat, and the technical officer finds the bugged briefcase and money in the father's car.
TBA	35	"Intruder"	Graham Theakston	Roger Parkes	—	15 November 1988	Terence Wilton and Iain Rattray
While Melvin and Haynes are on the beat, they are nearly decoyed away from a robbery. Giving chase, Haynes is diverted to an armed robbery while Melvin has to let his prisoner go so he can help Haynes. The armed robber is paranoid and thinks everyone is poisoning him.
TBA	36	"Conflict"	Graham Theakston	Al Hunter	—	17 November 1988	Alex Kingston and Russell Lewis
DCs Tosh Lines and Jim Carver are carrying out an obbo on a man who might lead them to an arms dump. WPC June Ackland and PC Pete Ramsey arrest him because he beat his girlfriend who didn't want him to go out. The doctor at the hospital is going to make a complaint against Ramsey because of the way he interrogates the girlfriend.
TBA	37	"Duplicates"	Niall Leonard	Simon Moss	—	22 November 1988	—
Due to her slight resemblance to a missing woman, WPC Brind reluctantly agrees to perform a reconstruction of her disappearance for television. DS Roach and DC Carver go to serve an arrest warrant for video piracy, but instead find the aftermath of a bare-knuckle boxing match and a critically injured fighter. The organiser tries to bribe Roach. Carver and Roach manage to locate their video pirate, but Dashwood shows up late to the raid as he is speaking to camera for the reconstruction. The missing girl's parents thank Brind for her help.
TBA	38	"Snout"	Paul Harrison	Arthur McKenzie	—	24 November 1988	Desmond McNamara
D.I. Burnside wreaks havoc in custody, bending every rule he can in pursuit of justice.
TBA	39	"Old Habits"	Barry Davis	Nicholas McInerny	—	29 November 1988	Geoffrey Beevers, Hilary Mason, Ralph Nossek, Lee MacDonald and Aimée Delamain
WPC Brind is called to the house of an elderly lady, Mrs Lomax, who has just been burgled. The old lady is in such a state of shock, she attacks Brind and then suffers a heart attack and dies. It appears there's been a spate of burglaries against several old people from the Salisbury Day Centre, and Brind attends with Insp Frazer to give a talk on crime prevention. DC Dashwood talks to the previous victims and comes up with a possible suspect: Terry Newton, a young lad doing community service at the centre. Terry's probation officer is obstructive to the investigation, and Dashwood is convinced they have their man. Terry admits to Brind that he thinks he knows who it was: Danny Harvey, the junkie nephew of one of the day centre members. DS Roach and Dashwood go to Maurice Harvey's flat – he's an old villain from the time of the Krays – and find that Danny has overdosed in the next room, but his uncle doesn't care.
TBA	40	"The Silent Gun"	Terry Marcel	Christopher Russell	—	1 December 1988	James Gaddas, Peter Caffrey, Damaris Hayman, Milo Sperber and Richard Bonehill
PC Haynes arrives at a house to investigate what seems like a routine disturbance. Instead he finds a bailiff who has been shot in the hand while trying to evict the lodger in the upstairs room. Ch Supt Brownlow cancels his early finish and takes charge of the siege. Ch Insp Conway and several armed police from Sun Hill and the TSG move in to try and negotiate the gunman's surrender with no response. A Polish interpreter is brought in when it is realised that the man is Polish, not Irish as reported by the landlady. There is still no response, and a local shopkeeper tells PC Smith that the man, Lublin, is also deaf. With no chance of him hearing them approach, armed police and a police dog storm the room and arrest the man. The local residents are getting antsy about being denied access to their homes. PC Edwards is sent to turn a woman's oven off, but he breaks into the wrong house. In 2022, floor assistant Richard Marson recorded a Video Commentary for this episode, released exclusively on Patreon.
TBA	41	"An Old Fashioned Term"	Philip Casson	Geoff McQueen	—	6 December 1988	—
PC Edwards and WPC Martella find the naked body of a young woman who appears to have gassed herself to death, but they notice the neighbour who reported the death wiping something from the dead girl's mouth. DC Carver can't believe DC Lines has been a DC for twelve years. Lines isn't convinced the girl's death was a suicide, and impresses Carver with his detective skills when he solves the case – the neighbour, Kelly, has knocked her out with chloroform, raped her, and then turned on the gas. Kelly finally admits it, but Tosh is upset when he won't admit why. DC Dashwood is furious when DS Roach stands him up on an obbo to have dinner with Insp Christine Frazer.
TBA	42	"Getting Stressed"	Philip Casson	Christopher Russell	—	8 December 1988	Tim Preece
Frazer is driving to work when she sees an accident. On informing the man she has rescued she is a police officer, he hits her. Ramsey deals with a lady who was raped. An old lady helps Dashwood with info about motorbike muggers. After June brings in a lady drunk in charge of a baby, she goes to help CID as a decoy. After a chase Dashwood lets them get away. Ted is told to stop the relationship he has with Frazer.
TBA	43	"Tigers"	Terry Marcel	Edwin Pearce	—	13 December 1988	Michael Goldie and Patsy Palmer
DI Burnside receives a phone call from an Asian boy who is frightened that a gang from the White Swan pub are planning to attack his father's restaurant. DCs Carver and Lines check it out but their car gets turned over, and the boy ends up in a canal. An old girlfriend of Carver's turns up looking for him with a baby whom she leaves behind.
TBA	44	"Guessing Game"	Jan Sargent	P. J. Hammond	—	15 December 1988	—
Neighbours report an elderly man hasn't been seen for a couple of days, and PC Ramsey breaks into the house to find the man dead on the floor. A doctor confirms he died of natural causes. As WPC Ackland checks the house, she is suspicious of the pictures on the wall and some woman's belongings in a shoebox. It appears the man had a fetish for restraining women against their will, and a CRO check reveals that he had form for such crimes dating back for decades. The belongings found in the house are quite recent, so DS Roach suspects that he had captured another victim before he died. Roach, Dashwood and Carver investigate every possibility and finally find another flat owned by him, but no victim. They realise that the neighbour who reported him missing was his intended target, but Roach decides not to tell her about how close she came to danger. Featured location: Trellick Tower
TBA	45	"The Assassins"	Terry Daw	Douglas Watkinson	—	20 December 1988	Daniel Flynn, Frank Mills and Owen Brenman
Burnside and Tosh are in a cafe when it is set upon by a group of people who take apart restaurants. They turn out to be upper-class twits. One of them winds the magistrate up so much he is sentenced to 28 days in jail and the diplomat father of another waives his immunity. Yorkie and Haynes investigate a removal van. The elderly homeowner doesn't think the company is to be trusted and he is proven right after visiting the station three times. Tosh's wife turns up looking for housekeeping money from him, and she mentions it is their 15th wedding anniversary. In 2020, writer Douglas Watkinson and director Terence Daw recorded a Zoom Commentary for this episode, released exclusively on Patreon.
TBA	46	"Outmoded"	Terry Green	Barry Appleton	—	22 December 1988	Michael Fenton Stevens and Brian Miller
Sun Hill police are being called out to a series of bogus shouts which the Yard pins down to a computer hacker breaking into the police computer network. Sgt Cryer investigates, and finds a former university student who has acquired an ex-MOD computer which still had access codes to government and police networks on the hard drive. WPC Ackland checks in with a woman who is too scared to leave her flat as she has been repeatedly mugged. Ackland convinces her to go out to get some cigarettes, but when they return, her flat has been trashed. June arranges for her to be moved off the estate. Roach, Dashwood and Carver watch as a car is pulled out of the river with the body of a young woman inside. They question the car owner who had reported it stolen, but he is clearly hiding something. DS Roach must inform Sgt Cryer that it was his son, Patrick, who was driving the car when it went into the river, and that he'd left the scene.
TBA	47	"Digging Up the Past"	Barry Davis	Barry Appleton	—	27 December 1988	Dicken Ashworth, Gawn Grainger and Tessa Peake-Jones
An excavator on a building site has uncovered some human remains, and Sgt Cryer calls in CID. Cryer is avoiding returning to the station, as his son Patrick is being charged with causing death by dangerous driving. Ch Insp Conway, Burnside and Roach have a word with Cryer, who is avoiding his family. On the building site, DC Dashwood and the SOCO wind up the site manager by saying it may have been a murder, although the bones are very old. A riot ensues as the men want to return to work. Burnside arrives and nicks all of them. The bones turn out to be from the Great Plague of 1665. PC Edwards is angry after being sold forged theatre tickets by Ramsey. Ramsey claims innocence, and the pair manage to locate the forgers. Unable to interest CID in the case, they investigate on their own and blow a joint Fraud Squad and US Treasury operation to catch counterfeiters printing fake American dollars.
TBA	48	"Taken into Consideration"	Christopher Hodson	Lawrence Gray	—	29 December 1988	—
DC Dashwood and DC Carver are on an obbo in a street where a spate of burglaries has taken place. They see a young man, Kevin Boswell, climbing over a wall with a bag full of 50p pieces, and they arrest him for theft. They also take Kevin's girlfriend, Daphne, into the station as there is what looks like stolen goods in her house. Dashwood is positive Boswell is their man, and WPC Ackland makes a complaint against him when he applies too much pressure to Boswell during interview. Boswell is either really smart and devious or not too bright and living an elaborate fantasy about being a criminal. Dashwood and Carver return to Boswell's flat and find out which. In 2020, writer Lawrence Gray, camera operator Jamie Acton-Bond and actors Jon Iles (DC Mike Dashwood) and Matthew Sim (Kevin Boswell) recorded a Zoom Commentary for this episode, released exclusively on Patreon.
