= Cathie Linz =

American librarian and writer

Cathie Linz Baumgardner
- Born: 29 November 1954; Chicago, Illinois
- Died: 7 March 2015 (aged 60); Chicago, Illinois
- Occupations: Novelist, librarian
- Writing career
- Pen name: Cathie Linz, Cat Devon
- Period: 1981–present
- Genre: Romance
- Website: www.cathielinz.com

Cathie Linz Baumgardner (29 November 1954, Chicago – 7 March 2015, Chicago) was an American librarian and a USA Today writer of over 50 romance novels under the pen names of Cathie Linz and Cat Devon. Her romance novels are published worldwide in nearly 20 languages.

== Biography ==
Cathie Linz was born on 29 November 1954 in Chicago, Illinois. She was previously employed as Head of Acquisitions at Northern Illinois University Law Library. She went on to publish her first book in 1982 and has been the recipient of numerous awards, in addition to being named a lifetime honorary member of the Romance Writers of America. Her romance novels are known for their humor and witty dialogue.

Linz contributed to the landmark book, Dangerous Men and Adventurous Women: Romance Writers on the Appeal of the Romance, a hardcover lead title from the University of Pennsylvania Press which won the distinguished Susan Koppleman Award.

Linz lived in the Chicago area with her family and her cat. The cat, Whiskers, appeared on the cover of the December 2006 issues of Romantic Times. An avid traveler, she had been to the Swiss Mountains, Alaska, and the Grand Canyon.

Linz died on 7 March 2015 in Chicago.

== Awards ==
- Romantic Times Career Achievement Storyteller of the Year award
- Romantic Times Reviewers' Choice Award
- eHarlequin Readers' Choice Award
- Write Touch Award – Best Contemporary Category Romance

== Bibliography ==
=== As Cathie Linz ===
==== Single Novels ====
- Remembrance of Love – April 1982
- Wildfire – July 1983
- A Summer's Embrace – Oct. 1983
- A Charming Strategy – January 1984
- A Private Account – June 1984
- Winner Takes All – Sept. 1984
- Pride And Joy – Feb. 1985, Five Star Romance (hardcover reprint), July 1998
- A Glimpse of Paradise – May 1985
- Tender Guardian – Sept. 1985, G.K. Hall hardcover, large-print edition, December 1996
- Lover And Deceiver – January 1986
- Continental Lover – July 1986, Thorndike Large Print (Hardcover reprint) 1999
- A Handful of Trouble – January 1987, Thorndike Large Print (Hardcover reprint) 1999.
- Change of Heart – Feb. 1988
- A Friend in Need – Aug. 1988
- As Good As Gold – March 1989
- Adam's Way – September 1989
- Smiles – June 1990
- Handyman – January 1991
- Smooth Sailing – September 1991
- Flirting With Trouble – July 1992
- Male Ordered Bride – January 1993
- Escapades – Aug. 1993
- Midnight Ice – March 1994
- One of a Kind Marriage – Sept. 1994, G.K. Hall large-print edition March 1995
- Bridal Blues – November 1994
- A Wife in Time – Oct. 1995
- Wildfire – G.K. Hall, hardcover, large-print edition, March 1996. In UK hardcover large-print edition pub. by Chivers Press, June 1996
- Husband Needed – September 1997
- Daddy in Dress Blues – September 2000, Thorndike Large Print (Hardcover reprint) 2000
- Between The Covers – 2001
- Stranded with the Sergeant – 2001
- Catch of the Day – 2006
- Mad, Bad and Blone – 2010

==== Montana Mavericks Series Multi-Author ====
- Baby Wanted—May 1995

==== Three Weddings and a Gift Series ====
1. Michael's Baby – Sept. 1996
2. Seducing Hunter – Oct. 1996
3. Abbie and the Cowboy – November 1996

==== Too Marriage Makers Series ====
1. Too Sexy For Marriage – March 1998
2. Too Stubborn To Marry – June 1998
3. Too Smart For Marriage – August 1998

==== Best of the West Series ====
1. The Rancher Gets Hitched – 1999.
2. The Cowboy Finds A Bride – 1999.
3. The Lawman Gets Lucky – April 2000.

==== Marines, Men of Honor Series ====
1. The Marine and the Princess – 2001
2. Married to a Marine – 2002
3. Sleeping Beauty & The Marine – 2003.
4. Her Millionaire Marine – 2004.
5. Cinderella's Sweet-Talking Marine – 2004
6. The Marine Meets His Match – 2004
7. The Marine And Me – 2005
8. Lone Star Marine – 2006

==== Royally Wed Series Multi-Author ====
- A Prince at Last – 2002

==== Girls Do Or Don't Series ====
1. Good Girls Do – 2006
2. Bad Girls Don't – 2006
3. Big Girls Don't Cry'' – 2007
4. Smart Girls Think Twice – 2009

==== Omnibus in Collaboration ====
- The Rancher Gets Hitched / An Affair of Convenience (1999) (with Marisa Hall)
- The Cowboy Finds a Bride / The Way We Weren't (1999) (with Isabel Sharpe)
- The Lawman Gets Lucky / Beauty and the Bet (2000) (with Isabel Sharpe)
- The Matchmaker's Mistake / Between the Covers (2001) (with Jane Sullivan)
- A Princess in Waiting / A Prince at Last! (2003) (with Carol Grace)
- Rancher Gets Hitched / Not Exactly Pregnant (2004) (with Charlotte Maclay)
- Catch of the Day (2006) (with Beverly Brandt, Pamela Clare and Whitney Lyles)

==== Non-fiction titles ====
- Setting the Stage: Facts and Figures essay in Dangerous Men and Adventurous Women: Romance Writers on the Appeal of the Romance (1992, ISBN 0-8122-3192-9, 0-8122-1411-0)

=== As Cat Devon ===
==== Entity Series ====
1. Sleeping With The Entity (2013)
2. The Entity Within (2013)
3. Love Your Entity (2013)
4. Tall, Dark and Immortal (2015)
