= Mark Wingett =

English actor (born 1961)

- Born: Mark Christopher Wingett; 1 January 1961 (age 65); Melton Mowbray, Leicestershire, England, UK
- Occupation: Actor
- Years active: 1979–present
- Partner: Sharon Martin
- Children: 2

Mark Christopher Wingett (born 1 January 1961) is an English actor.

He is best known for his roles as PC/DC Jim Carver in The Bill and EastEnders as Mike Swann, Hollyoaks as Frank Symons and Heartbeat as Terry Molloy.

== Acting career ==
Wingett was born in Melton Mowbray, Leicestershire. His father was an officer in the Royal Navy, and the family moved to wherever he was stationed, including Malta and Singapore, but mostly in Portsmouth. He attended Padnell Junior School in Cowplain, followed by Horndean Technology College (then known as Horndean Bilateral School).

Wingett wanted to act from his youth and joined the National Youth Theatre. His film debut came in 1979 when he played Dave, a reckless and rebellious mod, in Quadrophenia.

In 1983 he took a minor role as a local press reporter in Channel 4's Brookside before making his first appearance as PC Jim Carver in "Woodentop", which became the pilot episode for The Bill. He was one of four actors in "Woodentop" who returned in the series' first complete season. He played Jim Carver in around 780 episodes, from 1984 until his departure in 2005 which ended 21 years on The Bill. Jim Carver was central to several major plotlines on The Bill, including the character's struggles with alcoholism, gambling and as a victim of domestic violence. Wingett made a brief return in March 2007 to coincide with the departure of Trudie Goodwin, then the only other remaining original cast member.

In 2005 he appeared in the BBC One soap opera EastEnders as Mike Swann, the father of Mickey Miller and Dawn Swann, initially for a week-long stint. He returned to the soap in late 2005, leaving in March 2006. Also in 2005 he appeared as Terry Molloy, a London gangster who had turned Queen's evidence on his cohorts following a robbery in the Heartbeat episode A Fresh Start.

Wingett provides the voiceover for the British television version of the hit American TV series American Chopper aired on the Discovery Channel. He also appeared in the "Spartacus" episode of the BBC's Heroes and Villains as the gladiator trainer Lentulus Batiatus.

In 2009, he appeared in the BBC daytime series Missing as Danny Hayworth alongside Pauline Quirke, returning to the programme for its second series in 2010.

In 2018, he issued a privately printed pamphlet Tattered Troubadour, a 36 page disquisition on the musician GG Allin at his own publishing house Nantz Press.

In addition to acting, Wingett has directed several stage productions. In 2010, he directed the play Good to Firm by Ed Waugh and Trevor Wood at the Customs House, South Shields. In 2000, Wingett directed the play Lone Star by James McLure, in a production which toured Australia and starred his fellow Bill cast members Russell Boulter and Huw Higginson.

== Personal life ==
Wingett's partner is Sharon Martin, a makeup artist. They have a daughter, Jamila, and a stepson Benny from Martin's previous relationship. The couple separated in 2000 after Yvonne Williams, a fire-eater who had appeared on The Bill as an extra, went to the press detailing her affair with Wingett over a number of years, but had reconciled by 2003 after a two-year separation. They both worked on the 2012 film Snow White and the Huntsman, with Martin as head of the makeup department and Wingett playing the character of Thomas.

Wingett is a keen scuba diver, fisherman, skier and wreck hunter. He started diving in 1984 at a sub-aqua club for London black cab drivers.

Wingett's sister, Fiona Wingett, is a magazine editor. She was the editor of New Idea magazine in Australia in the mid-1990s, then returned to Britain to edit the Personal magazine for the Sunday Mirror. His brother, Matthew Wingett, wrote several episodes of The Bill in the 1990s. His first episode, "Thicker than Water" was submitted under the false name "Matthew Brothers", so that it would not receive favourable treatment because of their relationship.

== Filmography ==
=== Film ===
Year	Title	Role	Notes
1979	Quadrophenia	Dave	
1979	The Music Machine	2nd Heavy	
1980	Breaking Glass	Tony	
1983	Fords on Water	Eddie	
1996	The Bill: Target	DC Carver	Video
2008	Jump	Oscar Reeve	Short film
2008	Beyond the Rave	Ed's Dad	Video
2008	Franklyn	Frank Grant	
2009	Jenny & the Worm	Mr. Tulse	Short film
2010	Rough Cut	Man with dog	Short film
2011	Intruders	Dave	
2011	War of the Dead	David Selzman	
2012	Snow White and the Huntsman	Thomas	
2012	Run for Your Wife	Man outside café	
2013	Dom Hemingway	Man outside pub 2	
2013	Walking with the Enemy	Sorenzi	
2013	Green Street 3: Never Back Down	Pistol Pete	Video
2014	Mr. Turner	Mariner	
2014	The Lost Choices	Dave	
2015	Dragonfly	Francis Grosvenor	
2015	Far from the Madding Crowd	Bailiff No. 1	
2016	I Am Hooligan	Ray - Justin's Father	
2016	Eliminators	Police Sergeant	
2016	A Reason to Believe	Harry	
2017	Gypsy's Kiss	Ron	Short film
2017	Being	Doley	Short film
2018	Dark Ditties Presents 'Finders Keepers'	Frank Hardy	
2018	God's Kingdom	Simon	Short film
2018	Been So Long	Mark - Bailiff	
2018	King of Crime	Marcus King	
2019	Mash	Tony	Short film
2019	Break Clause	Giles Davis	
2019	Beautiful in the Morning	Roland	
2019	Dark Ditties Presents 'The Witching Hour'	George Sinclair	
2020	Doll House	James	
2020	To Be Someone	Tommy	
2020	The Invisible Collection	Oscar Swindon	Short film
2021	The Interlopers	Ulrich	Short film
2021	Dead Again	Bob	
2021	Navigator	Gary	Short film
2021	Dark Ditties Presents 'Dad'	Reverend Alistair O'Brian	
2021	Dark Ditties Presents 'Stained'	Frank Hardy	
2023	Mercy	Slaughterman	

=== Television ===
Year	Title	Role	Notes
1979–1980	The Ravelled Thread	Billyboy	6 episodes
1980	Fox	Lee	Episode: "Stick or Twist"
1980	The Professionals	Big Punk	Episode: "Mixed Doubles"
1980	Caleb Williams	Farmer	Mini-series, episode: "#1.2"
1980	Play for Today	3rd Youth	Episode: "The Flipside of Dominick Hide"
1981	Private Schulz	Walter Schmidt	2 episodes: "#1.4" and "#1.5"
1981	Lady Killers	Alfred	Episode: "Miss Elmore"
1981	BBC2 Playhouse	Johnny	Episode: "The Grudge Fight"
1982	The World Cup: A Captain's Tale	Deane	Television film
1982	Take Three Women	Kenneth	2 episodes: "Avril" and "Kate, Avril and Victoria"
1983	Storyboard	Jimmy Carver	Episode: "Woodentop" (Pilot for The Bill)
1983	Brookside	Reporter	2 episodes: "Fundraising" and "Jeans"
1983–2007	The Bill	PC/DC/DS Jim Carver	Main role, 792 episodes
1986	C.A.T.S. Eyes	Rider	Episode: "Honeytrap"
1990	Vic Reeves Big Night Out		Episode: "New Year's Eve Big Night Out"
1999	Operation Good Guys	The Corpse	Episode: "Forensics"
2005	The Bill Uncovered: Jim's Story	DC Jim Carver	Television film
2005	Heartbeat	Terry Molloy	Episode: "A Fresh Start"
2005–2006	EastEnders	Mike Swann	27 episodes
2008	Heroes and Villains	Batiatus	Episode: "Spartacus"
2008	Walter's War	Team Manager	Television film
2009	The All Star Impressions Show	Marco Pierre White	TV Special
2009–2010	Missing	Danny Hayworth	13 episodes
2010	Doctors	Martin Proudfoot	Episode: "Finding the Words"
2011	Banged Up Abroad	Chris Chance	Episode: "Daredevil Drug Runner"
2013	Hollyoaks	Frank Symes	2 episodes
2014	Salting the Battlefield	Football Supporter	Television film
2016	The Tunnel	Marty	Episode: "#2.5"
2017	Ransom's Law	DI Buttler	13 episodes
2019	Vera	John Brace	Episode: "The Seagull"
2019	Call the Midwife	Peter Jessop	Episode: "#8.6"
2022	Royal Autopsy	Charles II	Mini-series, Episode: "Charles II"
