= Peter Cregeen =

British television director, producer and executive

- Born: 28 January 1940 (age 86); London, UK
- Occupation: Television director and producer
- Years active: 1960s－
- Children: 4

Peter Cregeen (born 28 January 1940 in London, England) is a British television director, producer and executive. He was the original director of ITV's successful police drama The Bill, and made a substantial contribution to the series thereafter. He also served as Head of Series for BBC television drama between 1989 and 1993, which included cancelling Doctor Who after its 26th season and several years of poor viewing figures.

== Career ==
Cregeen began directing for television in the 1960s and producing in the 1970s. During the 1960s, 70s, and 80s he worked on numerous popular television series, including: The Troubleshooters (1965); King of the River (1966); Out of the Unknown (1969; 1971); The Onedin Line (1971; 1976); The Sandbaggers (1978); Colditz (1972; 1974) and Wings (1977–1978).

Cregeen has worked on various police dramas, including: The Gentle Touch (1980); The Expert (1969); Softly Softly (1969–1972); Z-Cars (1965); Juliet Bravo (1983), and the pilot to ITV's successful long-running drama, The Bill, which was originally named Woodentop (1983). As original director, Cregeen was responsible for The Bill's "distinctive and atmospheric feel", which he created by adopting a "fly-on-the-wall documentary style" with a single handheld camera. The response to Woodentop was so positive that within a month Thames Television had commissioned a 12 part series, which was renamed The Bill. Cregeen remained with The Bill, directing and producing between 1984 and 1987, and rose to executive producer between 1988 and 1989. Cregeen worked on The Bill during "its most popular period" when it switched in 1988 from a series to a year-round, twice-weekly half-hour format. He left the series and ITV in 1989 to become Head of Series at the BBC, later poaching fellow producer of The Bill Michael Ferguson to become executive producer of the BBC's flagship soap opera, EastEnders.

As Head of Series at the BBC, Cregeen was responsible for the Corporation's one-off and returning drama series. During his tenure, Cregeen made the controversial decision to cancel the long-running science fiction programme Doctor Who following the end of its 26th season in 1989. At the time, Cregeen told fans to expect a longer than usual wait for series 27, though he promised it would return. However Doctor Who did not return as an ongoing series on the BBC until 2005, without Cregeen's involvement, 16 years later. In 2007, Cregeen and various other BBC staff gave the reasons for the cancellation of Doctor Who on a documentary entitled "End Game", which is featured on 26th series DVD Survival. Reasons given included a general feeling at the BBC that the series needed a "rest", plummeting ratings—partly a result of being broadcast in direct competition to ITV's highest rated programme, Coronation Street—and a general disdain for science fiction among BBC staff at the time. In 2013, during an interview to mark the 50th anniversary of the series, Doctor Who executive producer Steven Moffat described the decision to abandon Doctor Who in 1989 as a decision of "outright stupidity and unforgivable blindness."

Cregeen continued to produce various programmes for the BBC, having previously been the executive producer for BBC TV's Not a Penny More, Not a Penny Less in 1990—a two-part miniseries based on Jeffrey Archer's best-selling book—and he also produced for A Question of Guilt in 1993. In 1993 a Doctor Who feature length film to mark the series' 30th anniversary was planned, with Cregeen taking on the role as producer; however production of the film, The Dark Dimension, was terminated by the BBC for "financial and logistical reasons."

Cregeen remained "Head of Series" at the BBC until May 1993, when he was replaced by Michael Wearing. He has worked on numerous projects for ITV and the BBC since, and was responsible for commissioning Carlton Television's successful drama Peak Practice in 1993. Cregeen has also been involved in theatre, working alongside multimillionairess, Janet Holmes à Court, to encourage TV writers to contribute to her stage productions.

He resumed producing and directing of The Bill throughout the 1990s and early 2000s, and produced The Choir, a five-part adaptation of the novel by Joanna Trollope, for the BBC (1994–1995). From 1999 to 2000 he produced for ITV's Midsomer Murders, and in 2001 he was appointed series executive producer of ITV's new soap opera Night and Day, which revolved around the lives of six very different families. He commented "We're making a soap that's modern, romantic and aspirational – a programme from a different perspective and in some ways a more realistic perspective. It's modern, sexy and fun with a very dark undercurrent." The soap was relatively unsuccessful, and was axed in 2003. Cregeen's latest directorial TV credit was for a 2003 episode of the popular BBC medical drama Casualty.
