= John Salthouse =

British actor and producer (born 1951)

- Born: 16 June 1951 (age 75); London, UK
- Occupations: Footballer, actor
- Years active: 1977-2013

John Salthouse (born John Lewis; 16 June 1951) is a British actor and producer. His best-known screen roles are those of Tony in Mike Leigh's Abigail's Party (1977) and DI Roy Galloway in The Bill from 1984 to 1987.

He has also appeared in Coronation Street (1977) I Didn't Know You Cared, EastEnders, Miracles Take Longer and in films such as A Bridge Too Far (1977), The Spy Who Loved Me (1977), An American Werewolf in London (1981), Those Glory Glory Days (1983), Give My Regards to Broad Street (1984), Prick Up Your Ears (1987).

== Career ==
Salthouse had previously been a professional footballer until injury had forced him to retire. He had played for Crystal Palace under the name of John Lewis in the 1960s, a fact which he drew on in playing the sullen Tony in Abigail's Party. He also appeared in the early series of the Sky One soap opera Dream Team as the club's academy coach, Frank Patcham. He appeared in Series 1 and Series 2, and later became one of the show's producers. For the penultimate episode, Salthouse made a cameo appearance offering a young Jason Porter a contract with Harchester United.

In 1997 he played Richard Ealham in the eighth episode of the seventh series of Heartbeat.

Salthouse wrote the CBBC show Hero to Zero, starring Michael Owen as himself.

He appeared as a guest actor in an episode of Silk broadcast on Tuesday 5 June 2012, and played DCI Sid Bradbery in The Great Train Robbery, broadcast on BBC1 in December 2013.

In 2020 he gave a rare in-depth interview about his time on The Bill and his career in general' for the book Witness Statements.

== Filmography ==
- Big Zapper (1973) – Kono's Henchman
- A Bridge Too Far (1977) – Private 'Ginger' Marsh
- The Spy Who Loved Me (1977) – REA Hunt (HMS Ranger Crewman)
- An American Werewolf in London (1981) – Bobby at Cinema
- Those Glory Glory Days (1983) - Young Danny Blanchflower
- Give My Regards to Broad Street (1984) – Tom the Roadie
- The Bill (1984–87) – DI Roy Galloway
- Prick Up Your Ears (1987) – Chauffeur
- Casualty (1993 -2012) – Andy Finch / Frank Swedener / Chris Weston
- Maigret on the Defensive (1993) – Dr Mëlan
- The Turnaround (1995) – D.I. Jack Robber
