= Robert Hudson (actor) =

English actor (born 1960)

- Born: 24 February 1960 (age 66); Sheffield, West Riding of Yorkshire, England
- Years active: 1976–present

Robert Hudson (born 24 February 1960 in Sheffield) is an English actor. He is most famous for his role as PC Tony (Yorkie) Smith in the ITV police procedural television series The Bill. He played the role from 1984 until 1989, and made two subsequent guest appearances in 1990 and 1991.

He has also appeared in many other television programmes, including Bad Girls, Coronation Street, Dalziel and Pascoe, Doctors, Emmerdale and Peak Practice, as well as films such as Mike Bassett: England Manager (2001). One of his three younger sisters is the actress and presenter Charlotte Hudson.
