= Jon Iles =

English actor (born 1954)

- Born: 17 May 1954 (age 72); Ripon, West Riding of Yorkshire, United Kingdom
- Occupations: Actor and voiceover artist
- Years active: 1977-present
- Website: http://www.joniles.net/

Jon Iles (born 17 May 1954 in Ripon, West Riding of Yorkshire) is an English actor who is best known for playing DC Mike Dashwood in The Bill from 1984 to 1992. He returned to the series in 1996, promoted to DS for the antiques squad. As well as a prolific stage career, Iles' other TV credits include To the Manor Born, The Dick Emery Show, Doctors, Crown Court, Law and Disorder, Never the Twain, Fresh Fields and Super Gran.

He now specialises in voiceover work for websites, training courses, documentaries, and company videos, working from a recording studio in Devon. In 2016, he voiced a character for the video game Enderal and in 2017, he voiced the UK TV campaign for the martial arts movie Blade of the Immortal.
