= Trudie Goodwin =

English actress (born 1951)

- Born: 13 November 1951 (age 74); Lewisham, London, England
- Other name: Trudie Jackson (married name)
- Occupation: Actress
- Years active: 1980–present
- Television: The Bill (1984–2007); Emmerdale (2011–2015)
- Spouse: Kit Jackson (m. 1979)
- Children: Jessica Jackson (born 1982); Elly Jackson (born 1988)

Trudie Goodwin (born 13 November 1951) is an English actress best known for playing Sergeant June Ackland in the high-profile ITV police drama The Bill from 1983 to 2007 and Georgia Sharma in the ITV soap opera Emmerdale from 2011 until 2015.

== Career ==
Goodwin appeared in seven episodes of Fox in 1980. In 1987, Goodwin appeared in an episode of Have His Carcase, a Lord Peter Wimsey novel televised by the BBC, playing the part of Cherie. The same year, she also played Brenda in Series 3 Episode 1 of Three Up, Two Down.

Goodwin played Sergeant June Ackland in ITV's police drama The Bill from the days of its pilot, "Woodentop", which was part of the Storyboard plays for Thames TV in 1983. However, in September 2005, Goodwin announced she would be leaving the serial drama, stating that "it was time to move on". She also took a sabbatical from the show, lasting for several months in 2005, in order to pursue other interests, which included charity work in Nigeria with CBM. Her last episodes aired in March 2007, making her not only the longest-serving member of The Bill cast in the programme's history, but also a world record-holder as the longest-serving actor to portray a police character.

When the show was cancelled in 2010, she told the BBC she'd "been in a state of shock all day because [I] honestly thought [it] would go on forever, and [I was] very very sad that it isn't going to." In a later interview with Angela Griffin, she said she felt ITV bosses "messed about" with the show unnecessarily, causing its cancellation.

She then appeared on a "TV Goodies/Baddies" episode of the game show The Weakest Link in March 2007, in which she lost out to Alex Walkinshaw in the final round. From 27 July to 7 August 2007, she appeared on Countdown in Dictionary Corner with Susie Dent, hosted by Des O'Connor and Carol Vorderman. Goodwin has made two appearances on ITV daytime show Loose Women, the first being May 2009, and the other in April 2010. In 2010, she was also a guest on Bill Bailey's Birdwatching Bonanza. In July 2007, she played Rosa Briers in Heartbeat ("The Medium is the Message", series 16 episode 20). In July 2013, she appeared on All Star Mr & Mrs.

Goodwin played Georgia Sharma in the long-running ITV soap opera Emmerdale between 2011 and 2015.

In November 2021, she portrayed the role of Meg Clarke in an episode of the BBC soap opera Doctors.

In addition to acting, Goodwin is also a member of The House Committee at Denville Hall, a retirement home for members of the theatrical profession.

== Personal life ==
Goodwin has been married to actor Kit Jackson since 1979. They have two daughters, including Elly Jackson, the lead singer of the British electropop band La Roux.
