= Colin Blumenau =

British writer and theatre director

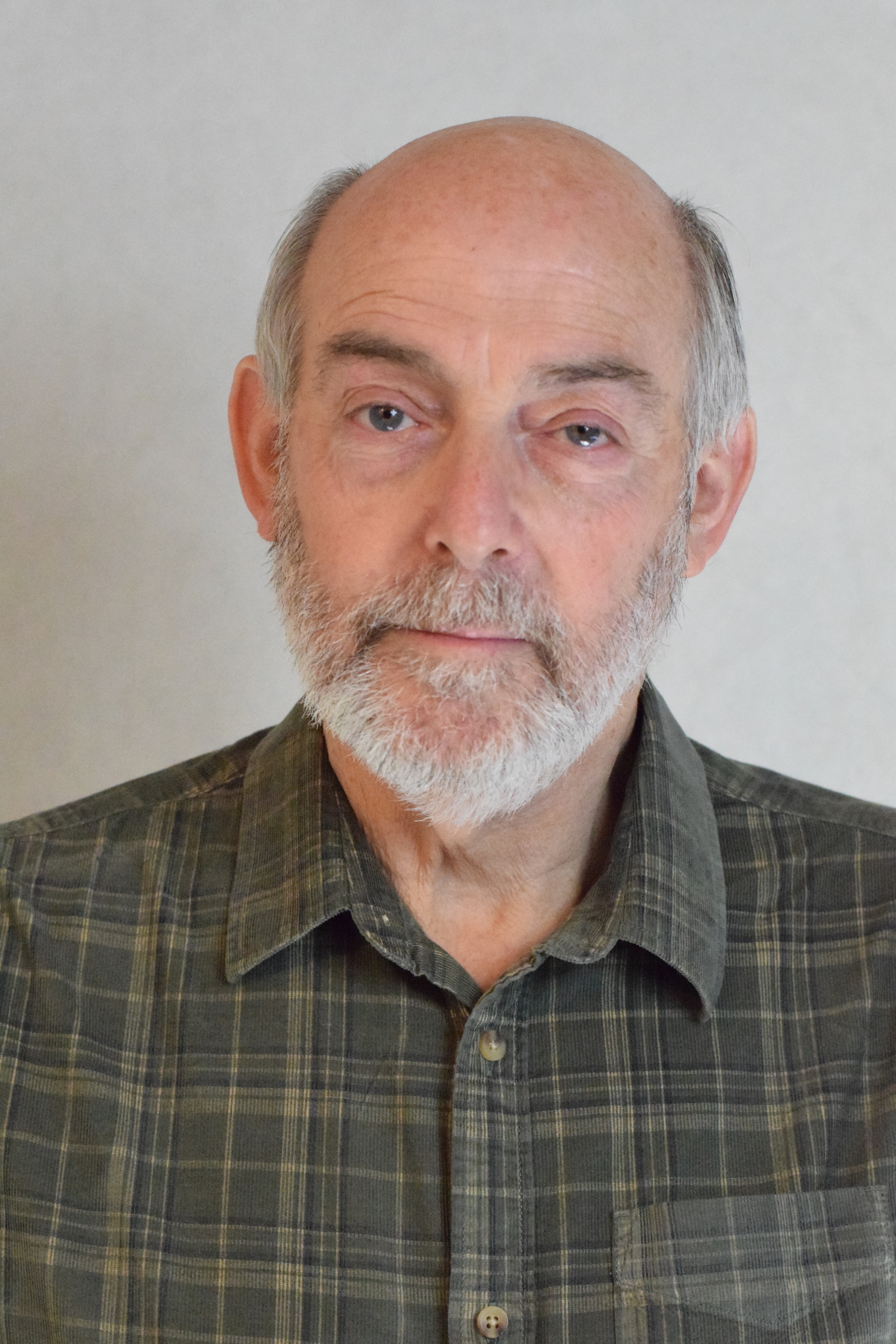
- Blumenau in 2024
- Born: 7 August 1956 (age 70); London, England
- Years active: 1979–present
- Spouse: Debbie O'Brien (m. 1982)
- Website: www.colinblumenau.com

Colin Blumenau (born 7 August 1956) is a British writer and theatre director. He is the son of Tom Blumenau and Eva Blumenau, both founder members of Amnesty International. He is the Artistic Director of The Production Exchange.

Blumenau was born in London. During his early career as an actor he came to public notice playing PC Francis "Taffy" Edwards in The Bill between 1983 and 1990. After leaving the programme, having appeared in more than 110 episodes, he began a career in theatre management. He was an Artistic Director of The Angles Theatre in Wisbech (1991–1993) and The Brewhouse Theatre & Arts Centre in Taunton (1993–1996).

He was Artistic Director of the Theatre Royal, Bury St Edmunds between 1996 and 2012 and spearheaded its restoration project. During this period, under the banner of Restoring the Repertoire, he also led the Theatre Royal's initiative to rediscover and restore the much-neglected English Drama repertoire of the 18th and early 19th centuries to the stage. Productions included Black-Eyed Susan by Douglas Jerrold, Wives as they Were and Maids as they Are by Elizabeth Inchbald, The London Merchant by George Lillo and the premiere of Inchbald's The Massacre. In addition, there were public readings of nearly seventy five plays by authors as such as Hannah Cowley and John le Planché.

Since 2012, Blumenau has resumed a freelance career as well as being the Artistic Director of The Production Exchange. The current chair is the BBC’s political correspondent, Ione Wells.

Recent production credits include On the Ropes at the Park Theatre in 2023, and You Are Going to Die at Southwark Playhouse in 2024.

Under the pseudonym of Daniel O'Brien, Blumenau writes scripts for both the stage and pantomimes, many of which have been performed in a number of theatres, notably at The Riverfront Arts Centre in Newport, Wales, Sutton Coldfield Town Hall and the Theatre Royal, Wakefield.

In 2020, Blumenau shared his memories of working on the first three series of The Bill for the book Witness Statements. He has also recorded two video commentaries for The Bill Podcast Patreon Channel, where he was also reunited with eight of his Sun Hill co-stars for a three-part Zoom reunion.

Blumenau has more recently returned to screen acting, featuring in the Blumhouse horror You Should Have Left, and guest-starring in an episode of EastEnders. In March 2023, he portrayed Dr Jerry Sutherland in an episode of the BBC soap opera Doctors. He also had a minor role in the pilot episode of the BBC's Daddy Issues.

== Personal life ==
He and his casting director wife Debbie O'Brien have three sons who have all also become actors; Dan, Jack, and Harry.
