= Respect (The Bill) =

Two-part series finale of The Bill

- The Bill episodes
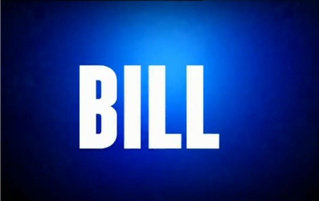
- An image from the final opening credits of The Bill
- Episode nos.: Series 26; Episodes 30/31
- Directed by: Reza Moradi
- Written by: David Harsent
- Original air dates: 24 August 2010 (Part I); 31 August 2010 (Part II)

Episode chronology
← Previous "Tombstone"	Next → —
- The Bill series 26

"Respect" is the two-part series finale of the United Kingdom's longest-running police procedural television drama series, The Bill. The final two episodes were written by David Harsent and directed by Reza Moradi, and aired on ITV1 on 24 August and 31 August 2010. The series finale, and the final scene, were specially written to include all 17 current cast members.

== Background ==
The Bill is a long-running police drama set in and around the fictional Sun Hill police station in south London. The show's focus is on the work and lives of the officers, led by Superintendent Jack Meadows (Simon Rouse) and Inspector Dale "Smithy" Smith (Alex Walkinshaw). Much of the officers' time is spent on the fictional Jasmine Allen estate, the setting for much of "Respect".

== Cancellation announcement ==
On 26 March 2010, ITV had announced that The Bill would end production after 27 years on air due to a decline in ratings, since the episodes were reduced to once weekly since July 2009 during the 25th series, as a result of the 9pm post-watershed slot. Filming for the final-ever episode of The Bill was completed in June 2010.

== Plot ==
=== Respect: Part I ===
Smithy is called to the Jasmine Allen Estate where he discovers a dying teenager, identified as Liam Martin, who has been stabbed by gang members. Investigations into his murder lead the team to Jasmine Harris (Faye Daveney), a previous informant of DC Mickey Webb (Chris Simmons). Investigations reveal that she lured Liam to where he was killed and she is arrested. In interview, Jasmine leads officers to Carlos Miller (Lewis Chase), who is arrested and claims that he killed Liam in self-defence. Jasmine is released on bail, against the advice of DC Webb, who believes that she is in danger from other gang members. Upon her return to the estate, a gang of boys forces Jasmine into a warehouse, where she is beaten and gang raped. A gunshot is heard, and the episode concludes with police arriving at the scene.

=== Respect: Part II ===
Following the murder of Liam Martin and the gang-rape of Jasmine Harris for talking to the police, uniformed officers arrive at the flat of Gary Wilson (Darragh Mortell), where they arrest him and Colin Simmons (Jumayne Hunte). As Meadows and Detective Inspector Neil Manson (Andrew Lancel) question the suspects, Smithy visits Jasmine in hospital, where she refuses to give a statement and prosecute. Due to a lack of evidence, the team are forced to release Simmons, Wilson and Carlos Miller. Jasmine is discharged from hospital, and still refuses to give a statement. However, as the team sees fit to give up, much to the anger of Mickey, CSE Eddie Olosunje (Jason Barnett) discovers that the gunshot fired at the end of the previous episode was fired upwards, and so possibly to alert passers-by, and to stop the gang-rape. Due to CCTV footage, the officers believe that gang member Derek Bailey (Femi Wilhelm) fired the shot, and set out to find him as a potential witness. They pull in courier Ruby Collier (Shahnequa Duprey). She initially refuses to help them, but sends Mickey a text message that leads uniform to Bailey's location. Sergeant Stone (Sam Callis) ascends to the top storey, where he discovers Bailey dying from a gunshot wound, inflicted by Gary Wilson, who holds Stone at gunpoint, when he attempts to help Bailey. Armed police officers arrive, and prepare to fire at Stone, who tussles with Wilson. A gunshot is heard, but nobody is harmed. Bailey is taken to hospital, and Wilson is arrested. After talking to Smithy and Mickey, Jasmine finally agrees to a statement, which helps to convict Wilson and the others of gang-rape. However, Jack is able to elicit a confession to Liam Martin's murder from Gary Wilson.

==== Conclusion ====
"Respect" concludes at a press conference, at which Meadows briefs reporters on the investigation and Wilson's confession. He finishes and rises to leave, before changing his mind and giving an impromptu speech on respect. He tells the assembled reporters and police officers that "somewhere along the line, someone changed the meaning. You earn respect these days through violence. Power. Fear. Money. The blade of a knife." He goes on to praise his team, Smith and Stone in particular, concluding that "today was one of the good days". The scene changes to a walkthrough Sun Hill with Mickey handing witness statements to Stevie, then he and Terry pinch Eddie's bag of crisps. After teasing Mel and Kirsty, Smithy and Stone leave the police station for the last time in their own civilian clothes to get a pint and they ask Mickey if he would like to join them. After lying to Max about going to the pub, Jo, Roger, Ben, and Leon bring in a stag party from the Bellcot Arms. As the two depart, Smithy has the last ever line, "Yeah, come on. Let's do it!", a nod to the pilot episode Woodentop, which opens with PC Jim Carver telling himself "OK Carver, let's do it!". The final shot is of the exterior of Sun Hill station, with Neil and Grace, holding hands as they leave, and Jack going to his car to drive home, and a dedication message to the men and women of the Metropolitan Police Service past and present appears, before the credits roll, to a mixture of the new theme music, and the original one, "Overkill".

== Production ==
To "sign off" the series, the producers considered that they could "blow everything up" but ruled that out because they wanted to do something that "celebrated what The Bill has always been about which is ordinary people wearing a uniform and taking responsibility for society". The producers decided that they wanted to symbolise that "life goes on" and end the series with "their heads held high".

In the finale, Callum Stone (Sam Callis) has to chase a suspect using one of the panda cars whilst Inspector Smith (Alex Walkinshaw) follows on foot. The dangerous parts of the car pursuit were carried out by stuntman Andy Smart, once Smart had finished filming, small car-mounted cameras filmed Callis driving before the shots were then cut together with those filmed by Smart. Later, when he finds hostage Derek Bailey, Stone comes face-to-face with Gary Wilson, the armed criminal responsible for Jasmine's rape and Liam Martin's murder. The Bill does not use extras for any scenes involving armed police; so, for this scene, the armed police surrounding the flat were played by "men who have been trained in the use of firearms and know what they're doing with a gun". The show has a stock of thirty replica weapons identical to those used by the Metropolitan Police although they are incapable of firing any shots. To prepare for the scene, a bag of fake blood is wrapped around the hostage's stomach and is punctured shortly before filming begins so when the actor clutches his stomach it will look as if he is bleeding.

The idea for the series finale came after research showed that rape is used to punish girl gang members. Series Producer Tim Key says "That is what The Bill has always done. It's held a mirror up to modern society and we wanted it to be like that right up until the final shot."

The final location shoot for the finale was carried out at a derelict estate in London which is due to be demolished. The Bill was always filmed on location in London whenever possible, "to keep the show authentic". Executive Producer Johnathan Young says "We feel that London is a part of the show, it's a character within the show and we've really encouraged directors to look for graphic locations that give you a real sense of being part of a big metropolis". Examples of these would include police chases by boat along the River Thames and helicopters aiding searches.

The police uniforms used in The Bill are authentic so when not in use they are locked away. The uniforms were originally bought from the police who agreed to buy the uniforms back when the series ended.

The final scene was a long take, filmed using a hand-held camera and featured 70 people in total. Of the final scene, Keys said that the producers knew they had to do "something special" but also wanted to show that "life goes on". To film the final scene, the cameraman had to keep the camera steady when following the characters going through the police station and then outside into the rear yard of the station where he stepped into a crane which then lifts to reveal the front of Sun Hill station. The show's producers were also included in the final scene, playing the part of journalists at the press conference hosted by Jack Meadows. Keys described the experience as "eerie" because "you were sat there on the front row listening to Simon making a very moving speech that sums up the show and his time in it".

== Critical reception ==
Critics were generally impressed with "Respect". The Belfast Telegraph called it "hard-hitting and poignant—a gritty two-parter that ensured the much-loved show went out with a bang." The reviewer went on to suggest that the episode was "a subtle two-fingers salute to the men in suits" at ITV who made the decision to cancel The Bill, a sentiment shared by Sam Wollaston of The Guardian, who suggested that the Superintendent Jack Meadows' final speech, on the subject of respect, may have been partly directed at the "ITV top brass". Benji Wilson, writing for The Daily Telegraph, compared The Bill to "the pensioner who still turns up for work", saying that viewers "tend to appreciate The Bill simply for staggering on and on, rather than for the quality of its output", though went on to call "Respect" "a hugely potent – and distinctly British – piece of drama."

== Ratings ==
=== United Kingdom ===
Part	Viewers (million)	Ratings share	Rank (timeslot)
I	3.414	14.5%	1
II	4.412	19.3%	1

=== Australia ===
In Australia, the two parts of "Respect" were shown on 9 and 16 October respectively. Both instalments ranked first in their timeslot and fifth for the day.

Part	Viewers	Rank		
Part	Viewers	Timeslot	Day	Week
I	827,000	1	5	67
II	993,000	1	5	47
