= The Bill series 26 =

The Bill
- Series 26
- No. of episodes: 31

Release
- Original network: ITV
- Original release: 7 January – 31 August 2010

Series chronology
- ← Previous; Series 25

The 26th series of The Bill, a British television drama, was the final series of the police procedural programme. The long-running police drama aired 2,425 episodes over 26 years, with 31 coming in its final nine months on air.

On 30 April 2014, The Bill Series 26 Part 1 and 2 DVD set was released in Australia.

Plans were mooted for a revival of the series in 2021; however, at the time of writing, this remains the final series.

== Broadcast and ratings ==
Having been halved to one episode a week and axed from Scottish network STV the previous summer, the show's average viewership had dropped from seven million prior to the revamp to three, and as a result, the long-running police drama was axed on 26 March 2010. ITV director Peter Fincham also noted "the changing taste of viewers" played a part in the axing, and despite a petition and calls for another network to take on the series – the final episode – "Respect: Part 2", aired on 31 August 2010 – 15 days after the 27th anniversary of the pilot episode of The Bill, "Woodentop". The final episode was paired on the night with a one-hour special, Farewell The Bill, narrated by Martin Kemp (who also did the show's 2008 special The Bill Made Me Famous).

== Storylines ==
Final-year plots saw a promotion for DC Jo Masters as she became a uniformed sergeant, a mutiny in the uniform ranks following a suspension for Sergeant Callum Stone after he was accused of assaulting a member of the public, a cocaine addiction for DS Max Carter and a cancer diagnosis for DI Neil Manson's estranged pre-teen son. The show's final episodes were more of a throwback to the show's focus on pressing issues and executive producer Johnathan Young's pre-revamp mantra of focusing on the victims, the fatal stabbing and a gang rape on a housing estate. The show followed ITV's requests for darker, gritty drama with episodes including domestic murder-suicide, stalking and football hooliganism.

== Crossover ==
Nearly two years after the final episode, the show's longest-serving character Supt Jack Meadows was featured in an episode of Leipzig Homicide, which involved him investigating a suspected murderer who has been living in London. In the episode it is revealed that at some point during the year and a half following the events of Respect, Meadows had retired.

== Cast changes ==
=== Arrivals ===
- PC Kirsty Knight ("Crossing the Line")
- Commander Lisa Kennedy ("Red Tape")

=== Departures ===
- DC Will Fletcher ("Be A Man"): Transfers to Westminster CID
- Commander Lisa Kennedy ("Great Responsibility – Part 2"): Departed after the arrest of her son as part of a murder inquiry
- PC Nate Roberts ("Death Knock"): Made unexplained exit prior to series finale
- Supt Jack Meadows ("Respect: Part 2"): Departed after the series finale
- Insp Dale Smith ("Respect: Part 2"): Departed after the series finale
- DC Grace Dasari ("Respect: Part 2"): Departed after the series finale
- PC Benjamin Gayle ("Respect: Part 2"): Departed after the series finale
- DS Max Carter ("Respect: Part 2"): Departed after the series finale
- DC Mickey Webb ("Respect: Part 2"): Departed after the series finale
- PC Mel Ryder ("Respect: Part 2"): Departed after the series finale
- PC Roger Valentine ("Respect: Part 2"): Departed after the series finale
- DC Terry Perkins ("Respect: Part 2"): Departed after the series finale
- DI Neil Manson ("Respect: Part 2"): Departed after the series finale
- PC Kirsty Knight ("Respect: Part 2"): Departed after the series finale
- DS Stevie Moss ("Respect: Part 2"): Departed after the series finale
- PC Leon Taylor ("Respect: Part 2"): Departed after the series finale
- DC Jacob Banks ("Respect: Part 2"): Departed after the series finale
- Sgt Callum Stone ("Respect: Part 2"): Departed after the series finale
- Sgt Jo Masters ("Respect: Part 2"): Departed after the series finale
- CSE Eddie Olosunje ("Respect: Part 2"): Departed after the series finale

== Episodes ==
#	Title	Episode notes	Directed by	Written by	Original air date	Prod #
1	"Be a Man"	Final appearance of DC Will Fletcher; Adam Astill and Amelda Brown guest star	Tim Leandro	Matthew Bardsley	7 January 2010	024
Valentine and Roberts attend when a doctor assaults a member of the public at St Hugh's. The man reveals his wife is having an affair with the doctor, but she claims he is mistaken. Stone is asked to escort him back to his vehicle at St Hugh's, but his harsh words lead the man to abduct his baby son. Determined to track him down, Stone is stunned when the man crashes his car after seeing the patrol cars behind him. Stone, Ryder and Roberts make a daring rescue, but the car explodes before they can rescue the baby. Stone is left mortified at the thought he could be responsible for the death of a child, but Smith relieves his stress by revealing the boy was not in the car. Fletcher, working the case on his last day at Sun Hill, lets slip to Webb that Stone's tactics are bullish to say the least, leading Webb to clash with Stone. Stone spearheads the manhunt for the missing boy, but can he undo the damage he caused in time?
2	"Held Responsible"	Colin Wells, Joe Cole, Chloe Howman and Tommy Knight guest star	Karl Neilson	Maxwell Young	14 January 2010	025
Perkins is assigned to a rape refuge when a girl reports she has been gang raped by her boyfriend and two of his friends, with a third being complicit. Stone leads a series of raids to arrest the suspects, but there is a lack of evidence for prosecution. When the girl receives an abusive and threatening phone call, her mother later identifies the mother of one of the boys arrested for the rape as the culprit. When video footage appears, can they finally piece it together in interview?
3	"Duty Calls"	Barry Sloane, Gareth David-Lloyd and Kara Tointon guest star	Reza Moradi	Patrick Homes	21 January 2010	027
Stone is put on a double shift when a man is found in a young woman's home. Meadows notices friction between Stone and Masters, but it does not stop the Super discussing a promotion to uniform Sergeant with Manson and Smithy. When it appears the burglar is a security guard in the office block where his victim works, Masters believes he was not there to burgle her. After discovering the burglar attacked a man the woman met in a bar the night of the burglary, and that he had been spying on her through cameras at the office, Masters believes he is obsessed with the woman. When she gets him in interview, his comments rile her, and she ends up in unexpected danger when he lashes out.
4	"New Beginnings"	DC Jo Masters is promoted to Sergeant; Gabrielle Glaister guest stars	Reza Moradi	Tom Needham	28 January 2010	028
Masters returns to uniform after her promotion to Sergeant, and she responds to a suspected burglary with Taylor, Gayle and Roberts. On arrival, they find a man with a serious head injury, who dies in hospital. Dasari believes the man's wife is responsible, and when she brings up the woman's religion, Carter angers Dasari by claiming the religion means he cannot say anything against the woman. Masters leads the search for evidence, while CID look into the family. CID believe the son is hiding something, and it's revealed the victim was leaving his wife for another woman.
5	"Time Bomb"	Paul Reynolds, Daniel Coonan and Linette Beaumont guest star	Karl Neilson	Steve Bailie	4 February 2010	026
Stone and Gayle are the first on scene when a PA in an office block finds a suspicious package in a pile of letters. When the device goes off, Stone has to assure the woman while sealed in the office. The HAZMAT crew determine the device was a sugar bomb, and the woman is freed from the office. CID are tasked with investigating why the device was sent, and who it was sent to.
6	"Keep Her Talking"	Ivan Kaye and Dylan Llewellyn guest star	Gary Love	Julie Dixon	11 February 2010	031
When a former DS reports he has been locked out of his house by his ex with his deaf son inside, a gun is discharged. It is revealed she is a manic depressive with a drug charge in her history, and it is left to Masters to negotiate. She had dealt with the woman before over child custody, and sets up a webcam through her older son's laptop. Perkins investigates the mother's claim of child neglect against her ex, and it becomes apparent that not only did she take the rap for his drugs, but that he used it to get full custody of their children. With evidence in place, Masters thinks she's done enough to coerce the mother out of the house, but when Carter denies her a chance to go onto the ground to talk her out, negotiations hit a brick wall, leading to a tragic ending.
7	"Crossing the Line"	First appearance of PC Kirsty Knight; Anthony Green guest stars	Declan O'Dwyer	Clive Dawson	18 February 2010	029
After a night out with mates from his old station, Stone intervenes in a domestic dispute and is savagely assaulted; Banksy and Manson investigate the assault. New PC Kirsty Knight pairs with Ryder to investigate a disturbance at the pub run by the woman Stone was trying to protect. Suspecting her son knows more than his mother is letting on, Stone tries to get the boy to open up after he is arrested smashing up the pub. When he admits his mother's boyfriend is a drug dealer, he is arrested, but he is quickly bailed owing to lack of evidence. Angry at not getting justice for his assault, Stone takes matters into his own hands.
8	"Red Tape"	First appearance of Commander Lisa Kennedy, temporary departure of Sgt. Callum Stone	Paul Wroblewski	Steve Trafford	25 February 2010	033
Stone and Masters lead uniform in a carrier to a mass brawl at a club. As chaos ensues, Stone pushes a passer-by away from an injured female, causing the man to have an epileptic seizure. When a brawler witnesses the incident and alleges an assault by Stone, Area Commander Kennedy attends amid allegations of police brutality. Stone is livid to be under investigation again, and clashes with Smith. A rift occurs between the PCs, Smith, Meadows and Masters. Meanwhile, Moss is sceptical when the owner of the club claims he was robbed during the brawl, and she suspects an insurance job.
9	"Protect and Serve"	Faye Daveney and Cathy Murphy guest star	Paul Wroblewski	Jeff Dodds	4 March 2010	034
Roberts and Gayle are left shaken when a bullet flies through the back of their IRV in a shooting that also injures a member of the public. CID investigate, while Meadows and Kennedy provide support to uniform. Despite this, the rift between the PCs, Smith and Masters continues as morale remains at an all-time low. When a suspect's home is raided, Roberts and Valentine clash with Smith mid-incident, leading to a confrontation that ends with SO19 taking the suspect down with a taser. Things only get worse when it appears the suspect is innocent, leading to the threat of complaints for injuring an innocent man. Knight makes a breakthrough on the case, but Smith is left frustrated when she refuses to help on the arrest. Meanwhile, Webb befriends a witness in the shooting after breaking up a domestic disturbance between the girl and her mother.
10	"Ricochet"	Faye Daveney and Kate Magowan guest star	Karl Neilson	Chris Ould	11 March 2010	035
Masters is first on scene when a woman claims she hit a boy with a car. When she finds him in a local park, paramedics attend to him, where he dies of his injuries. Medics reveal he was not killed by the collision with the car; he was shot. Masters clashes with Taylor and Ryder over their reluctance to inform the boy's mother of his death as she continues to struggle to gain the respect of her PCs. However, when a raid on a suspect goes wrong, Carter blasts uniform to Masters; furious, she stands up to her old DS in front of an impressed Roberts, who tells the rest of uniform it is obvious where Masters' loyalties lie. Meanwhile, Webb consults Jasmine Harris again after she appears at the scene of the shooting.
11	"Impact"	Faye Daveney and Kate Magowan guest star	Karl Neilson	Maxwell Young	18 March 2010	036
Uniform and CID go head to head in an attempt to nail Paul Sorrel's killers. Certain a drug deal lay at the heart of the young teen's murder, Webb goes to Jasmine Harris for info once more, but Carter intervenes as he grows frustrated at Webb's lack of progress. Carter arrests her for possession with intent to supply after finding the money Webb gave her for information, leading her to lose faith in the police. Banksy tries to get a local dealer, Devon Marshall, to give evidence in the case after being placed at the scene of the drug deal that saw Paul Sorrel lose his life. When Marshall finally tells CID the full story, they are stunned at who he names as the killer.
12	"The Truth Will Out"	Return of Sgt. Callum Stone; Joel Beckett and Marc Baylis guest star	Reza Moradi	Sarah-Louise Hawkins	25 March 2010	041
Meadows and Kennedy call Stone back in to apologise to the man he was accused of assaulting during the pub brawl a few weeks earlier. Smith suggests it to boost morale in uniform, but their plans are sidetracked when a four-year old boy is reported missing. Perkins is concerned about a link to a local paedophile, but Smith suspects the father may be involved. When the father speaks to Stone, he tries to convince Smith that he cannot be responsible, but evidence begins to stack against the father. Uniform are led to an industrial estate where the boy could be, but Smith and Ryder are put in danger trying to make the rescue.
13	"Great Power"	—	Alex Pillai	David Lawrence	1 April 2010	039
Meadows spearheads a major crowd control team for a football match. Stone returns to active work as he, Masters and Smith run the team. Meanwhile, Moss calls Webb in on his Sunday off to attend to a serious assault. Meadows, determined to keep the rival fans apart, keeps pushing the fans further away as techinal issues halt trains taking fans to the stadium. Moss and Webb's case gets in the way of the incident as one of the road's the fans are diverted onto has a burnt out car that was evidence in the case. With the car too hot to be loaded onto a tow-truck, Meadows orders Smith to keep the fans held. When an asthmatic woman collapses and the ambulance struggles to get to her, Kennedy orders Smith to release the fans, worried about allegations of kettling. As the dust settles, events take a sinister twist when a man's body is found on the route to the stadium.
14	"Great Responsibility"	Final appearance of Commander Lisa Kennedy	Alex Pillai	David Lawrence	8 April 2010	044
Meadows and Kennedy are left to deal with the fallout as the press lap up kettling allegations amidst the death of a football fan the day before. Things only get worse for Kennedy when her son Mark is pictured on CCTV chasing the victim into the alleyway where he died. As CID continue to investigate the man's death, FLO Valentine presses the family for info. Kennedy fights her own judgement as she struggles to comprehend the thought her son may be responsible. As Mark refuses to comment in interview, Meadows tries to get Kennedy to persuade Mark to tell the truth. Elsewhere, Perkins and Knight hunt the other men seen with Mark Kennedy in the alleyway.
15	"Bad Blood"	Michael McKell and Catherine Bailey guest star	Declan O'Dwyer	Emma Goodwin	13 April 2010	030
Webb receives a call from a known drug dealer following the death of his brother, an old friend of Webb's. The dealer asks Carter and Webb to investigate the death, claiming it was no accident. Their digging suggests the family are being targeted when the victim's home and cafe are broken into. However, it is confirmed by his supplier that he ordered the break in to retrieve a gun he gave the victim for protection. Carter maintains his and Webb's cover by taking cocaine, using the situation to arrest the supplier for his drug running operation. When he is cleared of the murder, Webb is stunned to discover the real culprit.
16	"Paying the Price"	Charles De'Ath guest stars	Richard Signy	Michael Crompton	20 April 2010	038
A man causing a disturbance is concerned his wife has gone missing after checking into a hotel. When they check the room they find a severely beaten man. When the woman is found, she is cleared and Manson orders her release. When her phone records show she called the man whose DNA is found on the victim, Manson is told by Manchester CID that the woman has been in witness protection for 15 years, and that the assault suspect is her estranged brother. When he tells all, they go all out to track her down before she can come to harm.
17	"Suffer in Silence"	Lee Ross, Robbie Gee and Rupert Farley guest star	Gary Love	David Lawrence	27 April 2010	032
Manson struggles to cope as he accompanies his son Jake to hospital for chemotherapy, with doctors suspecting he has leukaemia. He tries to distract himself when he investigates an allegation of sexual assault by a man caught fighting with a retired cab driver. When they discover they have the wrong man, CID look for the real suspect and other possible victims.
18	"That Type of Cop"	—	Richard Signy	Julie Dixon	4 May 2010	037
Bristol Police bring a 17-year-old girl to Sun Hill after she is found wandering dazed and confused on a motorway, and it is revealed the girl has been missing for two years. Events are complicated when the girl goes missing from hospital; however, she is found fighting with her ex-boyfriend's new girlfriend. Perkins suspects the boyfriend is key to a ring exploiting girls into underage sex, and later clashes with Carter after his maverick methods put a young girl at risk of being raped.
19	"Deadly Consequences"	Emily Joyce and Diana Kent guest star	Reza Moradi	Emma Goodwin	11 May 2010	040
Manson's fears over his son's chemotherapy come on top when the murder of a missing 11-year-old boy hits too close to home. He continues to clash with his team, with Olosunje having it out with him as he tries to push him for details he does not have, but he later opens up to Dasari. Despite stress mounting, he strives to crack the murder investigation. The parents come into the frame as their story continues to change, and the boy's school suggest he'd been causing trouble for attention, as his sick sister has been taking up a majority of his parents' time.
20	"Walk on My Grave"	Diana Kent guest stars	Robert Del Mastro	Steve Trafford	18 May 2010	042
As Manson and Dasari attend the funeral of the murdered 11-year-old boy, Carter launches an unauthorised operation to ensnare a group of suspected hijackers. Manson catches Webb at the funeral, then clashes with Carter and Dasari. Dasari's loyalty to her team and bond as FLO leave her torn. Carter continues to use cocaine as his addiction spirals.
21	"Ultimatum"	—	Robert Del Mastro	Tom Needham	25 May 2010	043
Carter heads up an investigation into a suspected paedophile, and a teenage girl is put in danger when he slips surveillance to meet her. Carter's cocaine addiction continues to spiral, and he is finally caught at it by Webb and Perkins. Banks lets slip that Manson's son Jake is fighting leukaemia.
22	"Intervention"	Temporary departure of DS Max Carter; Shelley King guest stars	Paul Wroblewski	Steve Bailie	22 June 2010	045
Manson tells the team about Jake's leukaemia treatment after getting the news he is in remission. CID then investigate when a car is found abandoned with blood stains inside. The case leads to an apparent kidnapping of an Indian man. Dasari goes undercover as his daughter to secure his rescue, but her bold actions put her life at risk. Carter finds a way out of trouble after Perkins threatens to expose his cocaine addiction to Manson if he does not confess.
23	"Solace"	—	Paul Wroblewski	Gregory Evans	29 June 2010	046
Knight and Taylor are first on scene when a group of kids find a young woman's body in a bag at a rubbish tip. Evidence found at her home suggests that it is a case of domestic murder. A man runs from the scene of her home after being confronted by Taylor, becoming prime suspect number one. A witness also places him alongside the victim at her son's school a few days before her death. The man is identified as her brother when he is arrested, but he is cleared of the murder, so attention shifts to her husband. Ridden with guilt, he makes a decision that devastates Taylor and Knight.
24	"The Calling"	—	Richard Signy	Julie Dixon	13 July 2010	047
Taylor struggles to cope after finding a young boy dead the day before. He pairs with Roberts on a case of a pregnant woman being hit by her own car in a hit and run. Taylor and Knight's attempts to keep their night of passion quiet goes awry when they are seen kissing on CCTV near to the incident. When the victim goes into labour two months premature, Taylor angrily confronts the suspect, but ends up being punched in the face. Determined to nail him, Taylor ends up realising he is looking in the wrong place. Stone, after trying to convince Taylor to seek help, is left torn over a letter saying his estranged father is terminally ill.
25	"Taking a Stand"	Claire Bloom guest stars	Richard Signy	Emma Goodwin	20 July 2010	048
Stone and Knight attend a burglary involving elderly widow. Knight immediately notices something wrong, and suspects they're not being told everything. Knight manages to get the woman talking, and she admits being raped. Her reluctance to revisit the trauma, and the washing of bedding and clothes at her home, makes the case more difficult for CID. Two witnesses are reluctant to come forward, with one missing key details in his statement, and the other unwilling to cooperate owing to a criminal past; could their reluctance be covering up for the crime? Meanwhile, after struggling with news that his mother wants to hear from him, Stone decides to visit her and his dying father.
26	"Who Dares Wins"	Return of DS Max Carter; Paul Copley, Nicola Stapleton and Otto Farrant guest star	Gary Love	Chris Ould	27 July 2010	049
Carter returns from leave to investigate the discovery of a man's body in a woodland. A pub landlord points them in the direction of a widower, and Carter, Perkins and Knight find his two children abandoned in their home. Stone and Carter clash after Carter pulls Knight from two separate tasks for his bidding, and he and Stone end up fighting in the briefing room. Perkins becomes suspicious about one of the man's neighbours, but Carter threatens the case with an off the record interview before his solicitor arrives.
27	"Balance of Power"	Ian Bleasdale, Michael Cochrane, Sally Faulkner and Stuart Laing guest star	Alex Pillai	Emma Goodwin	3 August 2010	052
Knight and Taylor attend a suspected burglary and find the homeowner's dog dead. A neighbour reports the owners are on holiday, but when their car is found burnt out with their suitcases in the boot, the case turns into a possible abduction. Manson clashes with Carter as he tells the relief about Manson's relationship with Dasari, leading the furious DI to pull Carter off the case and replace him with Moss. When Carter discovers a series of removals from the victim's bank account, he rejoins the case and sets up a sting, but the team are stunned at who shows up.
28	"Death Knock"	Final appearance of PC Nate Roberts; Sharon D. Clarke guest stars	Gary Love	Tom Needham	10 August 2010	050
Smith and Masters are concerned when Stone goes radio silent twice in a shift, but he returns to action when a woman is found after falling out of the window of a house. When they discover the house is a brothel and the victim is a prostitute, Carter shows no interest, so Smith tasks Stone with running the case. Another prostitute points the finger at the brothel's landlord, a suspected pimp. Knight continues to clash with Stone, and they end up in a screaming match when Stone jeopardises the victim's relationship with her father out of spite, and he continues to stew over the impending death of his own father.
29	"Tombstone"	Lesley Vickerage, David Schofield and Margot Leicester guest star	Alex Pillai	Maxwell Young	17 August 2010	051
While on compassionate leave, Stone attends the funeral of his father against the wishes of his mother. When she refuses to believe the allegations of rape of a probationer that divided Stone and his father while his father was still in the force, he sets out to find his alleged victim and prove she was telling the truth. Meanwhile, Knight and Gayle attend when a schoolboy reports being threatened with a knife. Events escalate when the woman is assaulted in the presence of her son. When the prime suspect walks after smashing his head into a cell wall, Stone sets about finding an alternative way to nail him.
30	"Respect: Part 1"	Faye Daveney guest stars	Reza Moradi	David Lawrence	24 August 2010	053
Smithy is first on scene of a boy found with serious stab wounds. As backup arrives to pursue a suspect, the boy dies in Smithy's arms. Manson spearheads the investigation, with early links made to a local gang, with his mother confirming he was a drug runner. Carter finds CCTV of Jasmine Harris soon before the murder, with Webb surprised by her early release from prison. Webb's hopes of regaining her trust are quashed by Carter, who has her arrested. When an overcrowding custody suite leads to her being bailed; Webb begs of Masters to keep her in for her own safety, but she is put back on the streets, leaving her in grave danger.
31	"Respect: Part 2"	Series finale; Faye Daveney guest stars. Final regular appearances of Supt Jack Meadows, Insp Dale Smith, DC Grace Dasari, PC Benjamin Gayle, DS Max Carter, DC Mickey Webb, PC Mel Ryder, PC Roger Valentine, DC Terry Perkins, DI Neil Manson, PC Kirsty Knight, DS Stevie Moss, PC Leon Taylor, DC Jacob Banks, Sgt Callum Stone, Sgt Jo Masters and CSE Eddie Olosunje	Reza Moradi	David Lawrence	31 August 2010	054
Last-ever episode. Uniform and CID join forces to nail the Parkway Crew for the murder of Liam Martin and the rape of Jasmine Harris. Following the gunshot that went off to alert uniform of Jasmine's rape, Perkins suspects local gang member Derek Bailey may know something, but they are unable to track her down. When Bailey is tracked down, he is found being held hostage by ringleader Gary Wilson. After holding Stone hostage, Stone secures his arrest. Meadows sets about tripping Wilson up to break Carlos Miller's false confession for Liam Martin's murder, while Webb tries to regain Jasmine's trust to get the truth about the rape. In the end, Meadows holds a press conference, outgoing Police Sergeants (PSs) Smithy and Stone finally leave Sun Hill Police Station for the very last time, after changing into their own civilian clothes.
