= The Bill series 25 =

The Bill
- Series 25
- No. of episodes: 65

Release
- Original network: ITV
- Original release: 1 January – 29 December 2009

Series chronology
- ← Previous; Series 24 Next → Series 26

The 25th series of The Bill, a British television drama, was the penultimate series of the long-running programme.

On 30 April 2014, The Bill Series 25 Part 1–3 DVD set was released (in Australia).

== Overhaul ==
The series began with several multi-part plots and hard-hitting storylines, as was done in the previous year, such as cot death and postpartum depression ("Little Girl Lost" Parts 1 and 2), teenager on teenager murder ("Teenage Kicks") and attacks on the police ("Back to School"). However, an ITV-mandated overhaul saw the series output halved to one episode a week, the show previously running two hour-long episodes at 8pm since 1998, the new format and theme tune to be launched that summer as one episode a week in a post-watershed slot of 9pm, starting from "Live By the Sword" to the final-ever episode of the 26th and final series "Respect: Part II" at the end of August 2010.

ITV claimed the show was needing a change of direction and was intending to make the show "darker, and more gritty", but it was also noted the show would save ITV up to £65 million by reducing its air time. The move would also see the show axed from Scottish equivalent network STV after 25 years, although this was not done with the support of ITV themselves; this made it inaccessible without viewers paying for satellite TV. The show would end up winning its first ever BAFTA for Best Recurring Drama in the spring, after the announcement was made, a reminder in hindsight of the show's successes prior to ITV's ill-fated overhaul a year before its conclusion.

== Cast changes ==
The overhaul led to the show's biggest cast cull since 2006, when executive producer Johnathan Young cleared out the bloated cast left behind by predecessor Paul Marquess; five characters were initially axed in Superintendent John Heaton, DS Stuart Turner, DC Kezia Walker and PCs Arun Ghir and Diane Noble, the latter of whom made a one-episode cameo for her exit, as actress Kaye Wragg was initially on maternity leave when she was dismissed. DI Samantha Nixon and PC Beth Green also left before the overhaul, but Nixon actress Lisa Maxwell resigned following a period of leave late in 2008 brought on by two miscarriages, while Louisa Lytton decided not continue after her two-year contract ended, with her exit as Green already announced in the autumn of 2008.

Claire Goose left her role as Inspector Rachel Weston after going on maternity leave, but owing to the show ending a year after her exit, it was never revealed if she would have returned permanently – leaving the door open by transferring to a new unit with Heaton, Turner and Walker, but only agreeing to the move for a year. After the overhaul, the most controversial of the exits came when the show's longest serving actor Graham Cole was dismissed from his role as PC Tony Stamp after 22 years. Gary Lucy resigned from his role as TDC Will Fletcher, as did Ali Bastian as PC Sally Armstrong, the latter in order to compete in the 2009 series of Strictly Come Dancing.

In addition to seeing ten characters leave the show, it is the only series in the show's history not to have a new arrival.

=== Departures ===
- PC Beth Green – Transfers to Witness Protection
- PC Arun Ghir – Resigns after suspension for allowing suspect to escape
- DI Samantha Nixon – Transfers to the Child Exploitation Team
- Supt John Heaton – Leaves to head up specialist group combating human trafficking
- Insp Rachel Weston – Joins Supt Heaton's new unit
- DS Stuart Turner – Joins Supt Heaton's new unit
- DC Kezia Walker – Joins Supt Heaton's new unit
- PC Tony Stamp – Transfers to Hendon to become an Advanced Driving Instructor
- PC Sally Armstrong – Unexplained
- PC Millie Brown – Unexplained

== Episodes ==
#	Title	Episode notes	Directed by	Written by	Original air date	Prod #
1	"The Morning After"	Return of DI Samantha Nixon; Duncan James and Christopher Timothy guest star	Tim Leandro	Matthew Bardsley	1 January 2009	653
During the cleanup of a homeless encampment, Stamp discovers a severely injured woman in the tent of a homeless man, George Durham. Nixon and Banks investigate the woman's husband, whose alibi of babysitting his baby daughter is unreliable. Attention later turns to George, who Stamp discovers was a firefighter who resigned after several people died in a tube station fire in the 1980s. When George is arrested for attempted murder, Nixon digs to help him fight his own memory issues and uncover the truth. When a loan shark comes into the picture, and the husband's alibi is proved wrong, CID look at who had the stronger motive. Stamp tries to convince George to move into supportive housing for ex-firefighters, then makes a touching gesture.
2	"Little Girl Lost"	Mia McKenna-Bruce guest stars	Reza Moradi	Sarah-Louise Hawkins	7 January 2009	650
3	"Little Girl Lost"	Mia McKenna-Bruce guest stars	Reza Moradi	Sarah-Louise Hawkins	8 January 2009	651
Part One: Weston leads the hunt for a missing baby girl; her nanny is pressed on her whereabouts and they discover she wasn't at home for a short period, and when a note left on an IRV points them to her boyfriend, he is put in the frame. Stamp is assigned as FLO, but is put in an awkward position when it appears the parents’ young niece put the note on the IRV. When another suspect comes into the frame, CID unearth an illegal adoption agency, but the baby found in the car of the suspects is a boy, leaving CID running down a blind alley. Further digging into the nanny and her boyfriend leads to a major development in the case, one that none of the team wanted. Part Two: Nixon leads the investigation into the death of the missing baby girl. The nanny and her boyfriend remain prime suspects, but events take a dramatic turn when the family car is identified on CCTV in the area. The mother is identified at the scene and confesses to being there, but the team are sceptical when she claims to only sitting outside the house. Nixon looks into the mother's history, unearthing a dark secret, but just when it appears she may be guilty, the post mortem reveals natural causes. Meanwhile, Banks tries to get the nanny to confess her part in the coverup of the baby's death.
4	"Teenage Kicks"	Jennie Jacques guest stars	Robert Knights	Will Shindler and Emma Goodwin	15 January 2009	654
5	"Teenage Kicks"	Jennie Jacques guest stars	Robert Knights	Will Shindler and Emma Goodwin	21 January 2009	655
Part One: Brown and Ryder investigate the disappearance of a teenage athlete. When he is found dead, connections are made the collapse of a teenage girl at a party that Armstrong and Stamp break up. The girl is revealed to be the boy's girlfriend, but she can't be interviewed while she is unconscious. The boy's friends come under fire, including a local drug dealer, but when he is cleared, two other friends come into the frame. Part Two: CID continue the investigation into the death of the teenage athlete. A friend is questioned when it appears his girlfriend slept with the deceased behind his back. Fletcher discovers he's been talking to the press to tarnish his friend's name. Heaton suggests using the press to get at the suspects, such as holding a conference to trip them up. The postmortem reveals that the boy died from a sharp blow, indicating that the murder weapon could be a nail in a piece of wood. Heaton uses the press once more to ensnare the suspects, but Meadows resents Heaton's moves.
6	"Feet of Clay"	Lynn Farleigh, James Gaddas, Cathy Murphy and Lee Whitlock guest star	Michael Keillor, Nigel Douglas	Julian Perkins, Steve Trafford	21 January 2009	657
7	"Feet of Clay"	Lynn Farleigh, James Gaddas, Cathy Murphy and Lee Whitlock guest star	Michael Keillor, Nigel Douglas	Julian Perkins, Steve Trafford	28 January 2009	658
8	"Feet of Clay"	Lynn Farleigh, James Gaddas, Cathy Murphy and Lee Whitlock guest star	Michael Keillor, Nigel Douglas	Julian Perkins, Steve Trafford	29 January 2009	659
Part One: Valentine and Ryder are first on scene when two boys discover human remains buried in a local park. Olosunje determines the victim, Susan Clark, was buried in 1988. Weston runs into former park-keeper Arthur Hurst, who goes from witness to suspect when Susan is revealed to have had a run in with him not long before her death. The family are implicated when it is revealed Susan had a relationship with her stepbrother Andy, who is found drunk at the scene. Just when it looks like someone in the family could be involved, Heaton realises similarities to a murder case from his days as a DC, blowing the case wide open. Part Two: With CID hitting a brick wall in the investigation to the death of Susan Clark, Heaton interviews jailed murderer Ian Ellis, convicted of the near identical murder of his girlfriend two months after Susan's death. Ellis is uncooperative, but when another missing person is revealed as a potential third victim, Heaton arrests him for Clark's murder. When the third body is found, Ellis goes on hunger strike and dismisses his solicitor, leading Heaton to come under fire. Part Three: Ian Ellis is rushed to hospital following a suicide attempt in his cell, and things only go worse for Heaton when Banksy discovers Ellis was in custody when the third victim went missing, leading Ellis' family to call for Heaton's job. He promises Ellis a quick release as he recovers in hospital, but Heaton offers to speed up the process if he gives information on two contractors that could be responsible. One is cleared, but the other is hunted down. After a chase, a woman is found unconscious but alive in his van, and Heaton considers using this to open up the suspect's wife.
9	"One Year On"	Guest appearance of former series regular Leanne Samuels; Nicôle Lecky guest stars	Michael Keillor	Si Spencer	5 February 2009	656
Smith and Walker investigate when a cab driver is viciously assaulted and robbed on the Jasmine Allen estate. When Smithy discovers the girl that was his last fare works at the estate's community centre, he comes face to face with an old friend, Leanne Samuels. When the cabbie's fare and her sister are suspected, Smith clashes with Samuels, realising that one of the suspects reminds Samuels of her late daughter Carly. When the girl steals Samuels' car, she gets a reality check, but the girl launches a counter claim after her arrest that the cabbie tried to rape her, leaving Smith and Walker investigating two potential crimes.
10	"Bleeding Hearts"	Ingrid Lacey guest stars	Mark Sendell	Roger Gartland	12 February 2009	662
Nixon and Masters investigate when Roberts and Gayle attend to an assault victim behind a parade of shops; Nixon is suspicious of the victim's link to a local drug dealer. While en route to hospital, Roberts bonds with nurse Maria, whose brother Emmanuel is a friend of the assault victim. However, any hopes Roberts has of a budding relationship is quickly extinguished when he is forced to arrest Emmanuel. Meanwhile, Masters and Stone investigate a potential link to a disrupted burglary near the scene of the assault. Events escalate when the victim's daughter goes missing, with blood stains left behind in her room, leading to a sinister discovery.
11	"Broken Hearts"	Fiona Dolman and Clare Clifford guest star	Mark Sendell	Clive Dawson	19 February 2009	663
Roberts and Gayle attend to an assault victim in a local park. When paramedics reveal she doesn't have an open wound, Roberts and Gayle deduce that the blood on the victim is not hers. A trail of blood leads to a bus, where an Asian female is seen vacating a seat soaked in blood. When she admits herself to hospital and quickly self-discharges, Roberts is furious to discover girlfriend Maria aided the woman, causing their relationship to hit the rocks. Roberts is further infuriated when he discovers Maria helped the woman because she is an illegal immigrant. The woman is tracked down, but refuses to give a statement, with fears she is being targeted justified when she is later kidnapped.
12	"Righteous Kill"	Honeysuckle Weeks, Velibor Topić and Robert Jezek guest star	Tim Leandro	Chris Ould	26 February 2009	632
13	"Righteous Kill"	Honeysuckle Weeks, Velibor Topić and Robert Jezek guest star	Tim Leandro	Chris Ould	4 March 2009	633
Part One: Carter investigates when an apparent case of vandalism turns out to be a protection racket within the Polish community. Nixon is furious when she discovers the main suspect, Marek Jankowski, is the brother of Thomas Jankowski, a man Carter killed during his CO19 days. Carter forms a bond with Thomas' wife Julie, and convinces her to set up Marek for a cigarette lorry highjack. However, tragedy strikes when Marek realises he's been set up. Part Two: CID's raid goes pear shaped after the disappearance of Marek Jankowski, and the shooting of informant Cezar Sobiesneki. Cezar's niece, Marek's sister in law Julie, accompanies him to hospital where he dies. Julie blames Carter for Cezar's death, and things get worse when Carter lets slip he killed her husband. When Marek attempts to abduct Julie's son Lukas, Carter convinces her to help him find her other son Pavel, prime suspect for Cezar's shooting, before CO19 do.
14	"Bail Me Out"	Josef Altin guest stars	Sallie Aprahamian	Steve Trafford	5 March 2009	643
Carter, Dasari and Banks arrest a drug dealer Carter has been determined to nail for almost two years. When his buyer escapes, he is pursued by Ryder and Brown, but the car crashes, leaving his female passenger seriously injured. The unidentified fugitive is eventually traced to a bail hostel, where three possible suspects are taken in for questioning, but a false confession makes CID's job twice as hard.
15	"Matters of the Mind"	Andy Linden and Brian Hibbard guest star	Matt Bloom	Si Spencer	11 March 2009	637
The resident magician of a social club turns to crime to fund a gambling habit and falls prey to a blackmailer threatening to harm his girlfriend. Manson and Moss persuade the hapless entertainer to take part in a sting operation at the club, but the suspect under surveillance becomes involved in a brawl and the money vanishes into thin air. Can Manson and Moss retrieve it?
16	"Leap of Faith"	Final appearance of PC Beth Green; Georgia Henshaw and Jacquetta May guest star	Richard Signy	Debbie Owen and Stuart Morris	12 March 2009	665
17	"Leap of Faith"	Final appearance of PC Beth Green; Georgia Henshaw and Jacquetta May guest star	Richard Signy	Debbie Owen and Stuart Morris	18 March 2009	665
Part One: Green investigates when her attempts to talk a girl down from a bridge fails, leading Roberts to heroically dive into the river for a daring rescue. Green uncovers a blackmail at the gym where she works, but clashes with Perkins over his heavy-handed tactics in interview, causing the girl to lose faith in Green. Green also asks Stamp for advice when she applies for a post at Witness Protection, while Nixon offers to help her by speaking to a friend who works there. Part Two: Green prepares for her last day at Sun Hill and Ryder and Brown urge her to show her feelings for Roberts at her leaving party. Green is pleased to find herself paired up with him on a call about a domestic disturbance in which a woman is found unconscious at the bottom of the stairs. She and Perkins are surprised to discover their prime suspect is the boxing club owner they interviewed the previous day about drug dealing on his premises. When his shop is robbed, Green suspects he is being targeted, until she discovers his daughter is the culprit. Realising her father may be responsible for the assault, Green and Perkins try to convince mother and daughter to admit the truth.
18	"Decision Time"	Final appearance of PC Arun Ghir	Paul Wroblewski	Isabelle Grey	19 March 2009	667
A lorry driver is left for dead by masked raiders when he is hijacked in an isolated lay-by. CCTV shows him smuggling a woman and her child into the country to help them escape a violent marriage, leaving CID investigating the assault and a possible human smuggling ring. The search is on to locate the stolen vehicle and its occupants, but when the cab is found without a trailer attached, there is a race against time to rescue the woman and child before they run out of air in the trailer. Ryder is suspicious when they find the trailer with no occupants, and when the driver's girlfriend is arrested, Ryder is horrified to find Ghir's number on the woman's phone.
19	"On the Money"	—	Indra Bhose	Jonathan Rich	25 March 2009	668
Stone and Taylor investigate a spate of burglaries on a local estate, and Stone thinks he knows who is behind it but first he must find evidence. Enlisting the help of Carter and Taylor, he lays a trap to nail the culprit. When money goes missing in a raid, Stone has to question his officers.
20	"Deal Me Out"	Oscar James guest stars	Paul Wroblewski	Maxwell Young	26 March 2009	669
Armstrong and Brown are called to a domestic disturbance, where they find a man throwing out his girlfriend's belongings following a row about her drug use. When the woman's involvement in the drugs scene leads to the kidnapping of their daughter, Smith organises a sting operation. Armstrong and Brown come under fire when a homeless man is found unconscious and seriously ill, leaving Smith to question if they were negligent during a welfare check.
21	"Got You Wrong"	Laura Doddington guest stars	Indra Bhose	Olly Perkin	2 April 2009	670
Stone befriends a woman suffering from domestic abuse at the hands of her gangster husband. She alerts the team of an operation between her husband and his criminal associates. Things get worse when Carter intervenes and she is assaulted. Her husband is left unaware when she gives Stone evidence on a cash in transit high-jack, but the raid team are left puzzled when the cash goes missing.
22	"Adult Education"	Phillipa Peak, Naomi Ryan, Ruby Bentall, Joel Fry, Elizabeth Rider, Ashley McGuire and Malachi Kirby guest star	1 and 2 – Sallie Aprahamian, 3 and 4 – Nigel Douglas, 5 and 6 – David Holroyd	1 – Maxwell Young, 2 – Frank Rickarby, 3 – Sally Tatchell, 4 – Will Shindler, 5 and 6 – Patrick Homes	8 April 2009	674
23	"Adult Education"	Phillipa Peak, Naomi Ryan, Ruby Bentall, Joel Fry, Elizabeth Rider, Ashley McGuire and Malachi Kirby guest star	1 and 2 – Sallie Aprahamian, 3 and 4 – Nigel Douglas, 5 and 6 – David Holroyd	1 – Maxwell Young, 2 – Frank Rickarby, 3 – Sally Tatchell, 4 – Will Shindler, 5 and 6 – Patrick Homes	9 April 2009	675
24	"Adult Education"	Phillipa Peak, Naomi Ryan, Ruby Bentall, Joel Fry, Elizabeth Rider, Ashley McGuire and Malachi Kirby guest star	1 and 2 – Sallie Aprahamian, 3 and 4 – Nigel Douglas, 5 and 6 – David Holroyd	1 – Maxwell Young, 2 – Frank Rickarby, 3 – Sally Tatchell, 4 – Will Shindler, 5 and 6 – Patrick Homes	15 April 2009	676
25	"Adult Education"	Phillipa Peak, Naomi Ryan, Ruby Bentall, Joel Fry, Elizabeth Rider, Ashley McGuire and Malachi Kirby guest star	1 and 2 – Sallie Aprahamian, 3 and 4 – Nigel Douglas, 5 and 6 – David Holroyd	1 – Maxwell Young, 2 – Frank Rickarby, 3 – Sally Tatchell, 4 – Will Shindler, 5 and 6 – Patrick Homes	16 April 2009	677
26	"Adult Education"	Phillipa Peak, Naomi Ryan, Ruby Bentall, Joel Fry, Elizabeth Rider, Ashley McGuire and Malachi Kirby guest star	1 and 2 – Sallie Aprahamian, 3 and 4 – Nigel Douglas, 5 and 6 – David Holroyd	1 – Maxwell Young, 2 – Frank Rickarby, 3 – Sally Tatchell, 4 – Will Shindler, 5 and 6 – Patrick Homes	22 April 2009	678
27	"Adult Education"	Phillipa Peak, Naomi Ryan, Ruby Bentall, Joel Fry, Elizabeth Rider, Ashley McGuire and Malachi Kirby guest star	1 and 2 – Sallie Aprahamian, 3 and 4 – Nigel Douglas, 5 and 6 – David Holroyd	1 – Maxwell Young, 2 – Frank Rickarby, 3 – Sally Tatchell, 4 – Will Shindler, 5 and 6 – Patrick Homes	23 April 2009	679
Part One – Back to School: Roberts is assigned as Safer Schools Officer to Deansgate Comprehensive after a fire in the art department. After a fight over a stolen iPhone is broken up, another is arranged, so Roberts enlists the help of Smithy, only for the Sergeant to be left fighting for his life after a stabbing. Drugs come into the equation, and Weston launches a raid when a burglary victim points out one of the yobs involved in the stabbing. Part Two – Learning Curve: Roberts, newly appointed Safer Schools Officer, uncovers drug abuse at Deansgate School. When a huge bag of ecstasy is discovered, he and Masters investigate a connection between a student and a drug dealer. Part Three – Peer Pressure: Roberts responds to a report of a break-in at the home of one of the pupils at Deansgate School. Masters discovers that the house was broken into by a fellow pupil who sought revenge for the alleged rape of his younger sister, and Roberts is put under pressure to find some answers. Part Four – Growing Pains: Roberts breaks up a fight between two adults outside Deansgate School. Masters and Fletcher investigate the subsequent assault of one of the adults, a parent of a pupil at the school, and discover that he is the victim of a slanderous campaign following accusations of rape. Part Five – Class Action: Roberts and Ryder investigate a break-in at Deansgate School, and are then called to the home of Roberts' close friend and art teacher Becky James, who has been seriously assaulted. Roberts and Banksy uncover a connection to an ex-convict, who is interested in a laptop belonging to James. Part Six – School's Out: Roberts discovers that a school governor is behind the attempts to steal Becky James' laptop, and that the couple had a prior relationship. Roberts and Banksy investigate suggestions that the governor might be guilty of abusing his daughter.
28	"Old Habits"	Guest appearance of now-Sgt. Diane Noble; Laura Pyper, Jolyon Coy and Kevin Doyle guest star	AJ Quinn	Chris Murray	30 April 2009	690
Former Sun Hill PC Diane Noble, now a Sergeant, joins Sun Hill for a night before joining her new post at Barton Street. She and Smithy lead the troops to a rooftop party at a building site, but events take a sinister twist when a boy falls from a ledge while high on ecstasy. Tests at hospital reveal they were mis-labelled as ketamine. Backed by Turner and Fletcher, uniform go undercover at a club to snare the dealer, with Taylor keen to impress Noble after getting off on the wrong foot. As Noble prepares to bow out of Sun Hill for one last time, she is called back to St Hugh's when the overdose victim's father stands on the roof in a bid to commit suicide.
29	"Forensic Evidence"	Rachel Bell guest stars	Richard Signy	Roger Gartland	7 May 2009	697
Taylor and Valentine respond to the report of an aggravated burglary and find the householder suffering from a head trauma. The victim identifies his attacker and reports an attempted blackmail, but the investigation by Turner and Webb is compromised by tampering at the crime scene. Olosunje bears the brunt of Turner's bullish tactics, after CID accuse him of overcompensating in the absence of Meadows, Manson and Nixon.
30	"Smash and Grab"	Nick Blood, Lara Cazalet and Mark Monero guest star	Diana Patrick	Tom Higgins	14 May 2009	671
31	"Smash and Grab"	Nick Blood, Lara Cazalet and Mark Monero guest star	Diana Patrick	Tom Higgins	21 May 2009	672
Part One: Gayle, Armstrong and Smith attend an armed robbery at a toy shop, with the manager shot during the raid, but a pursuit fails to prevent an escape. Carter takes charge of the investigation, and CCTV footage appears to show two known thieves casing the shop the day before. Carter suspects that a woman seen arguing with an employee moments before the robbery was acting as a decoy, but while Brown is convinced of her innocence, the rogue DS is only interested in undermining her opinion. Part Two: Brown and the sister of a suspect in an armed robbery investigation are taken captive by armed drug addicts. Carter, convinced he knows who is behind both the robbery and the kidnapping, mounts an observation with Armstrong and Gayle, but their operation is compromised when the kidnap victim's ex-husband arrives at the scene to confront their prime suspect. When Carter discovers his prime suspect is not responsible, he enlists his help to identify two of his employees, the men suspected of the abduction. Fletcher is intrigued to discover the toy shop manager was victim of another armed robbery a few years earlier; is he foolish enough to try it again or is it pure coincidence?
32	"Blame Game"	Ray Lonnen and Emma Stansfield guest star	Olivia Lichtenstein	Sarah-Louise Hawkins	3 June 2009	694
33	"Blame Game"	Ray Lonnen and Emma Stansfield guest star	Olivia Lichtenstein	Sarah-Louise Hawkins	4 June 2009	695
Part One – Full Throttle: A robbery at jewellery shop leads CID to an escaped convict on the run for murder, Manson sets off to find the killer, and tasks Carter and Moss with the investigation into the armed robbery, but could there be a link between the two crimes? Part Two – Blame Game: Carter and Moss continue to clash when their chase of a murder suspect ends in a near fatal motorbike crash. With the murder suspect critically injured hospital, CID re-open the murder investigation from four years previously when Moss becomes convinced the suspect is innocent. Carter is grilled by the DPS over his pressuring of Moss during their pursuit, leading to a reprimand from Heaton.
34	"Down South"	Rachel Davies, Pooky Quesnel and Saffron Coomber guest star	Richard Signy	Anita Pandolfo	11 June 2009	696
When a schoolgirl is reported missing, Taylor discovers she is a troubled teenager and begins to investigate her family, who fear she will return to her family in Manchester. Ryder is assigned as FLO, but clashes with Turner over her methods.
35	"To Live & Die For"	Final appearance of DI Samantha Nixon; guest appearance of former series regular Abigail Nixon; Ross Boatman guest stars	Reza Moradi	Damian Wayling	17 June 2009	666
36	"To Live & Die For"	Final appearance of DI Samantha Nixon; guest appearance of former series regular Abigail Nixon; Ross Boatman guest stars	Reza Moradi	Damian Wayling	18 June 2009	673
Part One – To Live For: Nixon tells Heaton she is transferring to the Child Exploitation Team at the end of the following day. Aiming to go out in style, she tasks CID with arresting suspected drug runner, Maloud Senac. Moss, Fletcher and Perkins observe his restaurant, and Moss recognises an old informant, Kenny Bordmann. He gives info on a drug shipment coming in from Cape Town. Moss discovers Senac's daughter Salma is in a relationship with freight owner Daniel Pfeiffer, the firm importing the drugs. A raid is launched; however, the team finds only a crate of pineapples. With Senac bailed and suspicious of his inner circle, he sets about keeping the police out, leading to two major incidents that sidetrack the drug importation investigation. Part Two – To Die For: With Salma Senac abducted and informant Kenny Bordmann in hospital after being kneecapped, CID focus on the abduction and shooting, putting a halt on the drug importation investigation into Maloud Senac. Daniel Pfeiffer sells brother Gary down the river to get Salma back, telling CID where they can find Gary's gun, and he is found and arrested. When Gary is released, CID manage to get both Gary and Maloud on tape and they are arrested for conspiracy to import Class A drugs; Nixon is left suspicious of how easy it was to nail her prime targets, and when Salma is found, they discover they've been blindsided by the real ringleader.
37	"The Prodigal Son"	—	Jamie Annett	Chris Ould	24 June 2009	680
38	"The Prodigal Son"	—	Jamie Annett	Chris Ould	25 June 2009	681
Part One: After an assault on a woman outside a PCP lab, Webb encounters Benjamin Meadows, the victim's boyfriend, with the DCI completely unaware that his son has been released from prison. Ben tells Webb that he is trying to get on his feet, but Meadows finds and arrests Ben when he is caught dealing on a local estate. Ben agrees to set up his dealer, Linton Barry, who Meadows suspects is working for Danny Travis, a dealer who is on the same wing Ben was on at Longmarsh. The deal goes pear-shaped when gunshots ring out. Part Two: Heaton takes charge of the dealing investigation, as Meadows cleans up the mess of the drug deal gone wrong, with buyer Mark Sennett injured and associate Zeppo Clarke shot dead. When target Linton Barry's car is found alight, a body inside is believed to be Meadows' son Ben. As Meadows laments his choice to send Ben to prison, he is overcome when Ben is found alive and well, leading to the discovery that Franco Osmond was the man who was in the burning car. Ben reveals to Meadows that Franco and Zeppo were hired to ambush the deal, so that Linton could be removed and Danny Travis could get full control of the empire. When Ben's girlfriend Petal Ford is abducted for cash that Ben stole in the deal, Barry is arrested in an armed bust. He agrees to give up Travis, but CID have to use Petal's brother Tommy, still in Longmarsh, with the help of Ben.
39	"Conviction"	Final appearances of Supt John Heaton, Insp Rachel Weston, DS Stuart Turner and DC Kezia Walker; Danny Webb, Tony Osoba, Natasha Little and Stuart McQuarrie guest star	1 and 2 – Simon Massey, 3 and 4 – Karl Neilson, 5 and 6 – Indra Bhose	1 – Len Collin, 2 – Clive Dawson, 3 – Julian Perkins, 4 – Sarah-Louise Hawkins, 5 and 6 – Maxwell Young	1 July 2009	682
40	"Conviction"	Final appearances of Supt John Heaton, Insp Rachel Weston, DS Stuart Turner and DC Kezia Walker; Danny Webb, Tony Osoba, Natasha Little and Stuart McQuarrie guest star	1 and 2 – Simon Massey, 3 and 4 – Karl Neilson, 5 and 6 – Indra Bhose	1 – Len Collin, 2 – Clive Dawson, 3 – Julian Perkins, 4 – Sarah-Louise Hawkins, 5 and 6 – Maxwell Young	2 July 2009	683
41	"Conviction"	Final appearances of Supt John Heaton, Insp Rachel Weston, DS Stuart Turner and DC Kezia Walker; Danny Webb, Tony Osoba, Natasha Little and Stuart McQuarrie guest star	1 and 2 – Simon Massey, 3 and 4 – Karl Neilson, 5 and 6 – Indra Bhose	1 – Len Collin, 2 – Clive Dawson, 3 – Julian Perkins, 4 – Sarah-Louise Hawkins, 5 and 6 – Maxwell Young	8 July 2009	001
42	"Conviction"	Final appearances of Supt John Heaton, Insp Rachel Weston, DS Stuart Turner and DC Kezia Walker; Danny Webb, Tony Osoba, Natasha Little and Stuart McQuarrie guest star	1 and 2 – Simon Massey, 3 and 4 – Karl Neilson, 5 and 6 – Indra Bhose	1 – Len Collin, 2 – Clive Dawson, 3 – Julian Perkins, 4 – Sarah-Louise Hawkins, 5 and 6 – Maxwell Young	9 July 2009	002
43	"Conviction"	Final appearances of Supt John Heaton, Insp Rachel Weston, DS Stuart Turner and DC Kezia Walker; Danny Webb, Tony Osoba, Natasha Little and Stuart McQuarrie guest star	1 and 2 – Simon Massey, 3 and 4 – Karl Neilson, 5 and 6 – Indra Bhose	1 – Len Collin, 2 – Clive Dawson, 3 – Julian Perkins, 4 – Sarah-Louise Hawkins, 5 and 6 – Maxwell Young	15 July 2009	003
44	"Conviction"	Final appearances of Supt John Heaton, Insp Rachel Weston, DS Stuart Turner and DC Kezia Walker; Danny Webb, Tony Osoba, Natasha Little and Stuart McQuarrie guest star	1 and 2 – Simon Massey, 3 and 4 – Karl Neilson, 5 and 6 – Indra Bhose	1 – Len Collin, 2 – Clive Dawson, 3 – Julian Perkins, 4 – Sarah-Louise Hawkins, 5 and 6 – Maxwell Young	16 July 2009	004
Part One – Cover Up: Smithy investigates an assault outside the E1 nightclub; a watch is found in the victim's pocket, and connections are made to a burglary Stone attends. Bar owner Jason Devlin becomes prime suspect in the assault, as the victim was flirting with his girlfriend. The burglary appears to be falsified when the assault victim is revealed to be the burglary victim's brother, and it appears that he was given the watch for a debt. With witnesses intimidated, including a cab driver, whose vehicle is torched, the case falls apart, only to then take a dramatic turn when a fire breaks out at the E1. Part Two – To the Limit: CID investigate the arson on the E1 bar; Stone, Smithy and Carter suspect Jason Devlin is behind the arson to get pay back on his bar manager for informing the police about an assault the day before. The Fire Investigation Officer finds fake documents in the roof of the manager's flat above the bar, where the fire started. Devlin is alibied, so CID look at his girlfriend, who is a suspected illegal immigrant. Part Three – Breaking Point: Smithy and Gayle see a driver abandon a lorry containing illegal Afghani immigrants, leading to two deaths. With unrest on their estate, Smith is furious to discover Jason Devlin is the landlord for many of the immigrants, and may be behind the human trafficking. In attempt to win the trust of a suspicious community, Smith visits a refugee centre, but a riot breaks out on the local estate when Devlin shows up to evict the tenants. Part Four – Walk the Line: Smithy is told by Stone he shouldn't confess to his assault on Jason Devlin, as Devlin will go down for his assault on Moss. From her hospital bed, Moss tells Fletcher that Devlin has a suspicious bag in his car boot, and that she was assaulted trying to look into it. When it is found full of stolen jewellery, Meadows and Manson suspect he is trafficking ringleader. Smithy uses Ara Byat to get her boyfriend, a Devlin associate out of fear, to testify against them. Part Five – Riot City: Weston leads her team on a public order training exercise after the disastrous riot where Valentine was snatched and Moss was assaulted. Smithy and Stone clash over recent events, while Meadows and Manson deal with the allegations against Smithy. Heaton reveals that he is to leave Sun Hill to head a specialist unit dealing with human trafficking, and makes a generous offer to Meadows. A witness to Smithy's attack on Devlin comes forward. Part Six – Judgement Day: When Jala Byat goes missing, the team are sidetracked from the Devlin trial. As a result, Ara Byat's boyfriend and the star witness, refuses to give evidence until Jala is found. Smith is forced to take the stand and defeat a barrister who is determined to expose his assault on Devlin. Weston accepts Heaton's offer of a transfer to his new division, while Walker and Turner also secure transfers to the team.
45	"Live By the Sword"	New opening titles and theme introduced, beginning of regular HD transmissions, DCI Jack Meadows is promoted to Superintendent, Sgt. Dale Smith is promoted to Inspector; Sara Powell and Andrew Tiernan guest star	Paul Wroblewski	Tom Needham	23 July 2009	007
46	"Live By the Sword"	New opening titles and theme introduced, beginning of regular HD transmissions, DCI Jack Meadows is promoted to Superintendent, Sgt. Dale Smith is promoted to Inspector; Sara Powell and Andrew Tiernan guest star	Paul Wroblewski	Tom Needham	24 July 2009	008
Part One: Stone and Gayle come across the teenage victim of a serious assault. Stone sets off in pursuit of a suspect, who steps into the road and is killed. Manson and Dasari investigate the original assault, while Banksy is assigned as FLO to the victim's family. Manson tries to open up the mother of the boy involved in the fatal crash as she determines to prove he was not guilty of the assault; however, they soon discover he wasn't as innocent as they thought, but a separate crime he committed clears him of the assault. With no leads, a huge twist in the case comes as they investigate the boy's brother, who points them in direction of a witness in the fatal crash. Part Two: Manson's investigation into a serious assault takes a tragic turn when the victim dies of his injuries. With their prime suspect in custody, he tries to convince Meadows that the victim, his brother and his friend were carrying knives. Banksy is furious when he is kept in the dark over surveillance being mounted inside the family's home. The team are shocked to discover that the victim's brother threatened the daughter of the prime suspect. However, when the knives are found, the suspect's blood isn't on the blade, leaving Meadows and Manson questioning whether he set out to murder.
47	"Cry Wolf"	—	Reza Moradi	Matthew Bardsley	30 July 2009	020
Webb and Banks are frustrated when a rape case falls apart. Webb is unwilling to drop it, and he goes to see the victim, where he is stunned to find her overdosing in a bid to commit suicide. Webb tries to get her to open up after her release from hospital, leading him to the realisation that the rape occurred two years earlier, making their investigation much harder.
48	"Absolute Power"	DC Stevie Moss is promoted to DS; Dannielle Brent guest stars	Richard Signy	Chris Murray	6 August 2009	005
Roberts and Gayle arrest a man for committing an assault in the local pub. Moss, in her first case since promotion to DS, suspects there's more to the case. Despite the man's insistence all is well, Moss visits his wife, and she discovers he is deeply depressed. She returns to the pub and finds out he bought a gun the night before. When he is caught on CCTV robbing a cafe at gunpoint, Smith suspects he's trying to fix his debts, but Moss uncovers an affair between the cafe owner and his wife. Determined to help, Moss is left powerless as she watches CO19 close in on him to stop him killing his wife's lover.
49	"Clouded Judgement"	Ruth Gemmell and Brett Goldstein guest star	Paul Wroblewski	Emma Goodwin	13 August 2009	018
50	"Clouded Judgement"	Ruth Gemmell and Brett Goldstein guest star	Paul Wroblewski	Emma Goodwin	20 August 2009	019
Part One – Psychiatric Help: Valentine, Ryder and Taylor go to the aid of a young boy found abandoned in a busy market. Manson and Dasari discover that the boy has witnessed an assault on his nanny. Manson discovers the key witness is psychiatrist Dr. Julia Bickham, who had her patient Michael Simms shot dead on Manson's orders in 2007. Meadows questions Manson's judgement, but he ends up with strong evidence suggesting the attack was as a result of mistaken identity, noticing that Julia is the spit of the nanny, and drives the exact same car. Part Two – Reaching Out: When Julia Bickham's boyfriend is run off his bike and seriously injured, Manson remains convinced Bickham is being hunted by someone with a grudge. Bickham is sceptical, but after meeting Dasari, she goes missing. Manson discovers their suspect is armed, and fearing history will repeat itself, goes in without backup.
51	"Lost Soul"	Sara Powell and Anthony Welsh guest star	Nigel Douglas	Patrick Homes	27 August 2009	011
Banksy encounters the Sissoulu family again after a man is brutally murdered in his corner shop. Banksy has to ask Joseph to betray Mo Campbell so that he can be questioned. When it appears he is protecting someone, Banksy goes digging around Mo's estate. CID find CCTV and Gayle finds an informant so the actual suspect is arrested, and it's not who they think it is.
52	"Powerless"	Georgia Groome, Reece Noi and Clare Calbraith guest star	Richard Signy	Steve Bailie	3 September 2009	015
A chase leads to the discovery in a warehouse of the body of a 17-year-old girl who has been shot through the heart. The team discover the girl went missing weeks previously, and re-open the investigation into her disappearance. However, Carter's attitude towards the children at the dead girl's foster home leaves Manson trying to regain their trust in order to find the killer.
53	"Innocence Betrayed"	Jeff Rawle and Michael Colgan guest star	Jamie Annett	Chris Ould	10 September 2009	010
Webb and Masters discover pornographic images of children on a stolen laptop, leading Carter to launch a raid on the suspect who had been charged and bailed. The suspect names a friend who borrowed it, and he takes full responsibility. Banksy suspects this is a lie, although concerns grow for the known ex-paedophile, who is living next door to a young girl against his bail restrictions, although there is even more concerns for the laptop thief's niece-in-law. Banksy work to prove the paedophile's innocence, believing that he had turned a corner and is not guilty.
54	"Consequences of Trust"	Dorian Lough and Susannah Fielding guest star	Paul Wroblewski	Gregory Evans and Jeff Dodds	17 September 2009	688
55	"Consequences of Trust"	Dorian Lough and Susannah Fielding guest star	Paul Wroblewski	Gregory Evans and Jeff Dodds	24 September 2009	689
Part One – Trust Me: Perkins and Banksy set up an OBBO on an address where drugs are being delivered. The drugs are seen being delivered, but when Carter sends in a bust squad, he discovers they have vanished. Masters meets an old informant, Fran Morris, who claims to have flushed the drugs for her flatmate, who stole them. Suspecting Fran is lying, Masters tasks Armstrong and Valentine with searching a rubbish chute, and their suspicions are proved correct when they find the heroin. As Fran agrees to setting up the dealer, it appears the suspected dealer's solicitor is the ringleader. Part Two – Backlash: Fran Morris is assaulted and her 12-year-old Noah goes missing. The primary focus is to first find Noah when his t-shirt is found with blood on it. When he is found, he bonds well with Carter, and a groundbreaking lead is uncovered. Carter tries to get a drug dealer to sell out Damian Tucker despite the fact that he is in jail. A bombshell discovery by forensics leads Carter to discover the case is not as clear cut as it seems.
56	"Long Gone"	Joanna Horton and Nathan Stewart-Jarrett guest star	Reza Moradi	Chris Ould	1 October 2009	009
Valentine and Ryder find a rent-boy assaulted in a local red light district. CID investigate when he drops a notice for a child reporting missing five years ago. Despite claiming he is the child on the notice, the DNA results reveal he lied, and all hope from the missing child's family is gone. CID continue his assault investigation, but the interview has to cut short when he injures himself. After it all seems like there's no hope, the rent-boy reveals he met this missing child at his hostel, leaving Moss determined to track him down for the sake of his emotionally overwhelmed sister.
57	"Fall Out"	TDC Will Fletcher becomes a fully-fledged DC; Emma Cunniffe, Alan McKenna and Adrian Schiller guest star	Jamie Annett	Patrick Homes	8 October 2009	006
An 8-year-old boy is abducted near his school. After digging, the boyfriend of the mother comes under suspicion, but after he is tailed and arrested by Fletcher and Dasari, a handover is compromised. A sting is set up, but it is compromised when the boyfriend pulls his wire.
58	"In The Know"	Kirsty Mitchell and Gemma Atkinson guest star	Tim Leandro	Frank Rickarby	15 October 2009	013
An OBBO that Perkins and Carter are working on is compromised when Taylor is spotted in the centre getting roughed up by the suspect. A plot is uncovered that Taylor's friend, a prison guard, is being threatened to bring a phone into the jail, and it escalates into a plot to murder a witness. Carter is reprimanded by Manson and Smith for his maverick methods.
59	"That's Love For You"	Roland Manookian guest stars	Reza Moradi	Clive Dawson	22 October 2009	014
During routine patrol, Taylor and Roberts are nearly involved in an RTC with a stolen Audi, but it appears someone has been injured. There are complications; the woman is the owner of the car and her 8-month-old daughter is still in the back. When the car is found in another RTC, the child is still missing. Taylor finds baby Chelsea with injuries in an alleyway, but the car jacker is found assaulted. He claims the injuries weren't inflicted by him, and Taylor gets personally involved, but will his persistence pay off?
60	"Show of Force"	Jimmy Akingbola guest stars	Paul Wroblewski	Julian Perkins	29 October 2009	016
Smith and Meadows launch a raid on a local estate. A major supply of drugs is seized and several major players are arrested but the main supply of drugs is missing, so the primary target is released. A witness' daughter is stabbed, while Stamp goes to help an elderly couple that were accidentally raided owing to a miss-sighted address. After doing what he does best and convincing the husband to make a statement about witnessing the major dealer stabbing the witness' daughter, he drops a bombshell that stuns oldest friend Smithy.
61	"Rescue Me"	Final appearance of PC Tony Stamp; Roland Manookian, Oliver Coleman and Bill Thomas guest star	Paul Wroblewski	Chris Ould	5 November 2009	017
Taylor and Roberts find Lily Wright's daughter Chelsea unresponsive after a supposedly accidental high-chair fall. Her estranged partner Gavin Downey is arrested, but Stamp suspects that Lily may be involved, and he tries to bond with her. Taylor tries to make Gavin leave London, while Stamp prepares for life away from Sun Hill after his 34 years there, to become the advanced driving instructor at Hendon.
62	"Twist of Fate"	Jessica Harris, Ian Kelsey and Tim Plester guest star	Tim Leandro	Steve Bailie	10 December 2009	023
Dasari befriends a woman who goes to work in a brothel to find out what happened to her missing sister. However, when she takes a punter hostage at knifepoint, Dasari convinces Meadows to reopen the investigation and sets out to find some answers, but the discovery of a body leaves Dasari looking for justice for the woman's sister and father.
63	"Unforgiven"	Final appearance of PC Sally Armstrong; Zara Turner and Pippa Haywood guest star	Nigel Douglas	Roger Gartland	17 December 2009	012
The search for a missing 15-year-old girl takes a twist when it appears she is the daughter of an incarcerated murderer. When it appears she has been dating the son of her father's victim, Manson suggests his mother talks to her husband's killer to get the girl freed. Banks forms a bond with the woman and clashes with Manson over his idea, but he manages to convince her to go into the prison; however, the meeting goes wrong. Webb clashes with Stone when a suspect escapes, with CID subject to wind-ups during the day from uniform after easily arresting one of CID's long-term targets.
64	"On the Streets"	Final appearance of PC Millie Brown; Ralph Ineson guest stars	Robert Knights	Andrew Alty and Patrick Homes	22 December 2009	021
65	"On the Streets"	Final appearance of PC Millie Brown; Ralph Ineson guest stars	Robert Knights	Andrew Alty and Patrick Homes	29 December 2009	022
Part One – Invisible Man: Webb and Banksy attend the scene when the body of a young solicitor is recovered from the River Thames. Dasari becomes convinced that the man's fiancée is hiding something. The deceased had been volunteering at a local shelter, and Webb goes undercover as a homeless person to pursue the investigation. Part Two – On the Streets: Webb is attacked after spending a night sleeping rough, but is rescued by a homeless woman he has befriended. He continues to bond with the other homeless people, but events take a sinister turn when an elderly homeless man is found dead at the bottom of a flight of stairs. Banksy and Masters investigate a rogue property developer with links to the solicitor's death after the discovery that he was trying to launch a class action lawsuit by the deceased homeless man for an unlawful eviction. Could he be a double murderer?
