= Truth Will Out (disambiguation) =

Truth Will Out is a 1993 album by Pigface.

Truth Will Out or The Truth Will Out may also refer to:

== Television ==
- The Truth Will Out, a Swedish television series

=== Episodes ===
- "Truth Will Out" (ER), 2008
- "Truth Will Out" (Holby City), 2004
- "The Truth Will Out" (The Bill), 2010
- "The Truth Will Out" (The Golden Girls), 1986
- "The Truth Will Out" (Holby City), 2006
- "The Truth Will Out" (Rubicon), 2010
