= Callum Stone =

Fictional character from British police procedural television series The Bill

- The Bill character
- First appearance: "Good Cop, Bad Cop"; 8 August 2007
- Last appearance: "Respect: Part 2"; 31 August 2010
- Portrayed by: Sam Callis

In-universe information
- Occupation: Police Sergeant

Callum Stone is a fictional character from the British police procedural television series The Bill, played by Sam Callis. He first appeared in the twenty-third series episode "Good Cop, Bad Cop", broadcast on 8 August 2007. Callis had previously appeared in the series during 2004, in a guest role playing the character of Karl Radford. Callis believed this familiarity helped him to quickly adapt to the role. Callum's role in the show is a Police Sergeant. He is characterised as having an unorthodox policing style and is portrayed in stark contrast to the rest of the show's characters. Callis has explained that The Bill's script writers made Callum's persona ambiguous, leaving viewers to interpret whether or not Callum is a good or bad intentioned character. Callis believed his character adopts his "own moral code" and Callum views his role as being "there to administer justice", but not to the extreme he is a vigilante character.

Producers included Callum in some of The Bill's notable storylines and stunts, including a bomb explosion and a river diving rescue scenario. Writers created a rivalry between Callum and Police Inspector Dale "Smithy" Smith (Alex Walkinshaw) from his introduction. A later story between Callum and Emma Keane (Melanie Gutteridge) hinted at romance but resulted in her death. Callum also shares numerous stories with Sally Armstrong (Ali Bastian). The show's executive producer Johnathan Young was invested in the character. In 2008, Young revealed that his writing team would fully explore Callum's contentious policing routines. When the show was reformatted into a late night drama, Young revealed that Callum would be centric to the show's continuation.

The Bill was cancelled in 2010 and Callis remained under contract until filming ceased. Callum's final stories explore his backstory, in which he attempts to expose his deceased father's criminal past and reconnect with his estranged family. Callis made his finale appearance as Callum in the twenty-sixth series episode "Respect: Part 2", which was also the show's finale.

== Casting ==
In June 2007, it was announced that Sam Callis had been cast in the role of Callum Stone. It was revealed that Callum is a Sergeant in the British police force and would be "independent and courageous" with "his own moral code and a strict sense of justice." Of his casting, Callis stated that he was "extremely excited" to play Callum because he is a "terrific character and something I can really get my teeth into." He added that Callum would have "an amazing storyline journey". Callis concluded that he was able to adjust to filming the role promptly because he already knew many of the cast and crew. Callis had previously had a guest role in The Bill, playing an alcoholic priest called Karl Radford during episodes broadcast in 2004. He made his debut in the episode "Good Cop, Bad Cop", which was broadcast on 8 August 2007.

== Development ==
=== Characterisation ===
Stone's a tough cockney. He enjoys policing in uniform for the statement it makes – CID isn't for him. He's a natural leader but also one of the lads who is encouraging, part of the team and full of camaraderie. Stone's got a strong sense of right and wrong and knows the law inside-out – enough to know how far to bend it for his advantage. Women want to be with him – men want to be him.

— A description from the character's biography on the official website.

On The Bill's official website, Callum is described as "a passionate believer in justice, so much so that he is perfectly prepared to operate outside of the law to restore order." He takes the phrase "an eye for an eye" literally, which undermines his work. He is characterised as a desirable "tough cockney" and a "natural leader" and a team player "full of camaraderie". Callum is knowledgeable in law and is initially portrayed as having a strong sense of morality.

Callis told a reporter from OK! that Callum is "quite an ambiguous character. You can't tell if he's good or bad." Callis revealed that he "loved" this characteristic despite him going to "such extremes" that viewers could view him as a "bad cop". He added that Callum is always genuine in wanting a "result for the good of everyone". Callum's persona caused Callis to receive jibes from his friends. He was not deterred from his admiration of Callum, adding "But that doesn't bother me, because I really like playing him. It's a complex role with lots of layers, and that's a gift for any actor."

Callis told a reporter from Manchester Evening News that he enjoyed playing Callum because of his ambiguous persona. He also "relished" the role because Callum's personality is the polar opposite to his own. He branded Callum "dark and complex" and "a very ambiguous man" who is "driven by his own sense of justice". Callum is portrayed in stark contrast to the rest of police characters. Callis explained that the main difference was that other policer officers working at Sun Hill believe "the police are there to administer the law". Callum views his role as being "there to administer justice", which Callis believed was different, but not as extreme as making Callum a vigilante character. He added that "he's also very closed-off, emotionally, with a lot of skeletons in the closet", but ultimately he has his own moral code in regards to what is "right and wrong".

Callis found it difficult to identify with Callum's policing occupation. He explained that the job role has an expectation for police officers to "remain emotionally detached". Callis believed he would be "a terrible policeman" and would never want to experience Callum's work life, despite his portrayal. He added that to help his portrayal of Callum, cast members from The Bill were allowed to meet and converse with actual police officers in police stations.

Callum's characterisation remained the same until the end of his tenure. Callis Laura-Jayne Tyler from Inside Soap that Callum's "code of conduct has always been very liberal. He's been such an interesting character to play, because one minute he's a straightforward copper, and the next he's quite brutal." Callis added that he always had to put on a "grumpy face" to play the character. He added that Callum was so grumpy that when not playing him, people would question why he looked so happy.

When Callum is introduced into the series, it is revealed he left his previous job because of arguments with his superiors. Callum arrives for his first shift at Sun Hill and his style of policing confuses his colleagues. Callis told an Inside Soap reporter that Callum makes it known that he will be "loyal and protective" of anyone who supports him. Most are "a bit suspicious of him" upon his arrival, especially Police Inspector Dale "Smithy" Smith (Alex Walkinshaw). Callum witnesses a man brandishing a cricket bat and tackles the offender. Smithy is unaware of Callum's identity, who is wearing plain clothes and is "embarrassed" upon discovering he has pinned down his new colleague. Writers created a work place rivalry between the two characters. Callis explained that "Stone and Smithy are chalk and cheese. They don't see eye to eye at first. If they worked together, they'd make an amazing team." Callis added that Callum behaves "all arrogant when he turns up" and Sun Hill police station is "Smithy's turf", which makes an ideal conflict.

=== Emma Keane and explosion ===
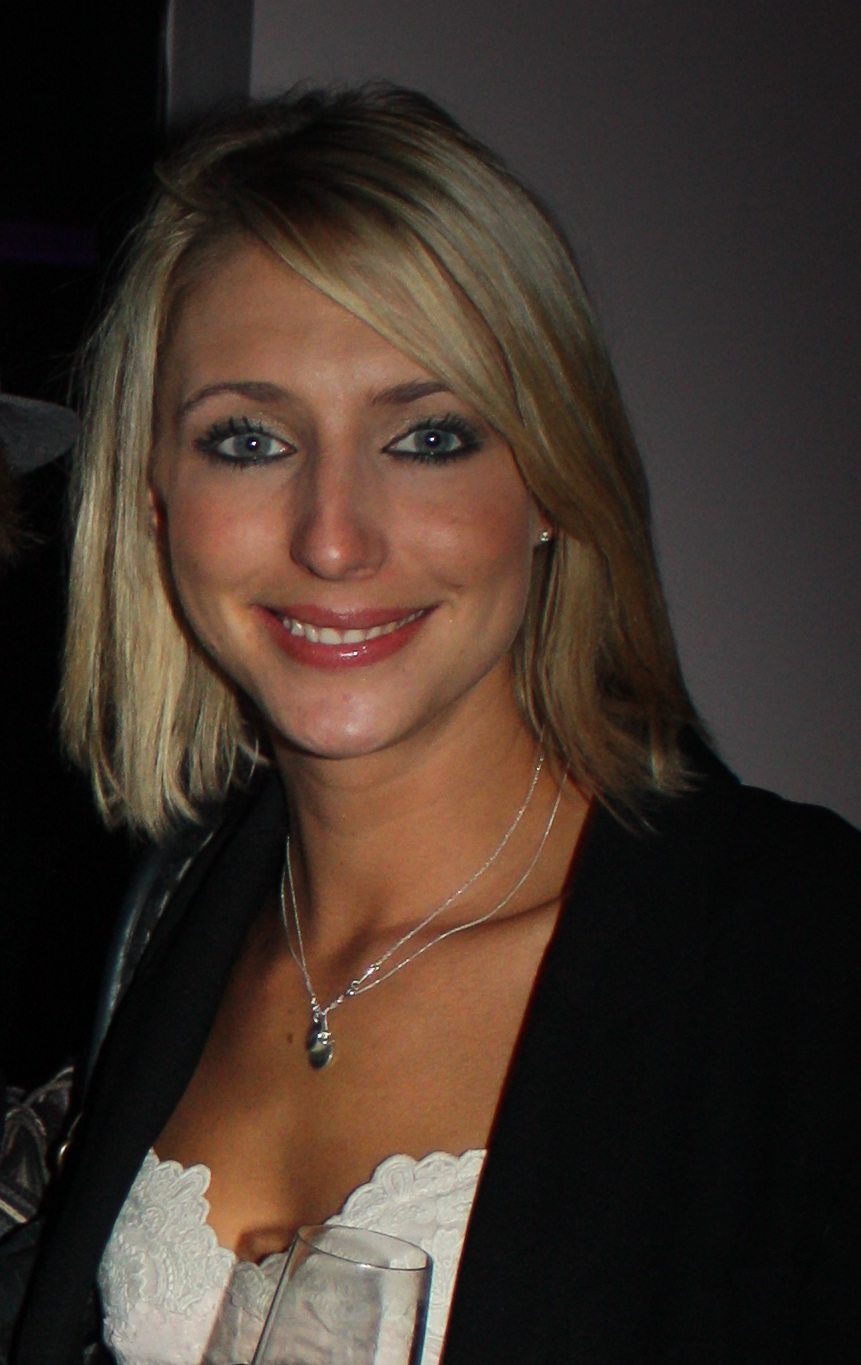
Callum shares various storylines with his police colleague Sally Armstrong, played by Ali Bastian (pictured).

Writers created stories between Callum and PC Emma Keane (Melanie Gutteridge), with romantic intentions of Callum's behalf. The duo are often portrayed at odds and having confrontations. A writer from OK! described Callum and Emma as "chalk-and-cheese coppers" and a "tortured twosome". Callum later responds to Emma by trying to kiss her. Gutteridge revealed that Emma initially views Callum as the "serious sergeant type" but gains more insight into his personality via her friendship with PC Sally Armstrong (Ali Bastian). Gutteridge explained that Emma does flirt with Callum but is not willing to pursue a relationship until "she knows he's a safe bet."

Callis believed that the potential romance was always more one-sided, with Callum harbouring stronger feelings. He added that "I think she prises him open through her inaccessibility. She's very feisty with him, she won't be told what to do, and I think he finds that quite attractive. The less she does what she's told, the more he finds it attractive." When Emma instigates a kiss between them, she recoils and makes it known she was teasing him. Callis believed that his on-screen counterpart was both "angry" and "completely enamoured" with Emma from there onwards. He concluded that any hints of romance between the two were only subtle, and while doubtful of an actual relationship between Callum and Emma, he wanted it to develop into a romantic relationship. Writers used Emma's scheming to expose a weakness in Callum's characterisation. Callis revealed that Emma's initial flirtation has "big effect on him". Callum views Emma as someone he can trust, he is "desperate to open up to someone" but she uses it against him and exposes "fragments of his turmoil".

In one storyline Sam and Emma attend the scene of an explosion. Sam discovers that a man has been posing as a medic to assault female victims. He leaves Emma behind to reprimand the imposter and she is caught up in a second explosion. Photographs from the explosion stunts were previewed online prior to the episode airing. Callis told Allison Maund from Inside Soap that his character views the fake medics actions as "heinous" and is determined to find him. Emma is one of Callum's PC and also someone he harbours feelings for. Callis explained that Callum took his "took his eye off the ball". He and Emma have had "a tricky time" and his feelings leave him "racked with guilt on both a professional and personal level". The actor was proud of the stunt scenes, which he thought were "shocking stuff" and would look "fantastic" on-screen. He told Maund that the filming was hectic because he had much to do in a small amount of time. Callis was also frightened by the explosions and praised their realism. In another interview, Callis stated "It was very emotional. But I do think it's the right time to show it. People will be able to relate to the story and the confusion caused by the explosions." He added "I felt like crying at the end of filming, it was just so draining." Callis stated that Callum feels guilty because of his policing style and behaviours. He feels additional guilt that he endangered Emma because of his own behaviours. Callis concluded that "it was a lot of fun to be able to concentrate on just that story over three episodes. It's a journey within the context of the show, and it's very satisfying when you get to the end."

In June 2008, The Bill's executive producer Johnathan Young told Kris Green from Digital Spy that Callum would continue struggle with his morality. He explained that "Sergeant Stone will continue to blur the boundaries between right and wrong – how far will he go to protect his own?"

In July 2008, Callum and Sally were featured in a water based stunt featuring them attempted to save a woman from drowning. The story begins after Kim Yates (Lorraine Stanley) is questioned by police and later drives her car into a river. Sally and Callum rush into the water to save her life. The plot served to show Callum and Sally's continued unorthodox policing style, as they defy orders not to enter the river from their superior Inspector Gina Gold (Roberta Taylor). They take in it turns to dive under the water until Kim is saved. A publicist from The Bill told a reporter from Evening Standard that "Gina wants them to wait for emergency services - but neither will listen."

In 2009, producers decided to revamp The Bill, turning the show into a new once-a-week and hour long drama with a grittier style and tone. This was ideal for broadcast after 9 PM in the United Kingdom. Young confirmed that Callum would continue to appear in the show's continuation. Callis told a BBC News reporter that the new late night timeslot would allow him to produce better acting on the show. He added "in terms of the storytelling, and the opportunities it gives you as an actor, it just allows you to do better work."

=== Father and backstory ===
In 2010, writers fully explored Callum's backstory and killed off Callum's father, Phillip. The story formed part of the show's continued commitment to exploring Callum's unorthodox policing style. Callum chooses not to inform his colleagues about his father's death and continues to work without compassionate leave. Callum investigates a case in which Zoe Williams (Leila Mimmack) injured following being pushed from a window. The main suspect, a drug dealer Dylan Prest (William Ellis) is assaulted. Callum's colleague, PC Kirsty Knight (Sarah Manners) suspects that Callum has attacked Dylan. He cannot cope with Kirsty's accusations and has a violent outburst when she questions him.

As the story develops, it is revealed that Callum's father was also a police officer. He had been accused of sexual assault twenty years prior, but Callum had never been able to convince his mother of Phillip's guilt. This led Callum to become estranged from his family and he decides to attend his father's funeral. Callum is unwelcome and his father's friends throw Callum out of the funeral venue. Callis told Inside Soap's Tyler that "Stone wants to connect with his mother more than anything. She still doesn't believe that her husband was responsible for such a terrible crime." Callum decides to track down the woman who accused Phillip of attacking her. Callum breaks policing protocol and uses confidential police records to locate her. This gets Callum into trouble at work for rule breaking.

In 2010, The Bill was cancelled. Callis remained on the show until the show ended and had appeared in 100 episodes. He made his final appearance as Callum in the show's finale, "Good Cop, Bad Cop". Discussing his departure from the role, Callis stated that it was a "tough" situation because of the multiple job losses. He concluded that "I have enjoyed the journey and I am definitely going to miss it. [...] I've really enjoyed my time here so it's sad, especially because I think there was more to wring out of Stone." Jason Steger from The Sydney Morning Herald reviewed the show's finale and opined that Callum and Smithy reached "some kind of rapprochement" despite there being "no sign here of emotional problems" in the episode.

== Reception ==
Laura-Jayne Tyler from Inside Soap branded Callum a "maverick cop" whose personality never changed. She assessed that "since joining the Sun Hill squad back in 2007, Sgt Callum Stone has never been afraid of bending the rules to help bring criminals to justice. Three years on and his attitude hasn't changed." A television critic from Irish Independent opined that Callum "makes an instant impact" upon his introduction into the series via his confrontation with a drunk criminal. An Evening Standard columnist branded Callum and Sally "valiant" characters.
