= List of awards and nominations received by The Bill =

The Bill awards and nominations
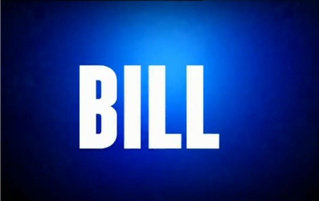
- Part of The Bill's opening sequence which was used from 23 July 2009 until its cancellation on 31 August 2010
Awards and nominations
Award	Wins	Nominations
British Academy of Film and Television Arts	2	8
Digital Spy Soap Awards	1	1
Ethnic Multicultural Media Academy Awards	2	3
Inside Soap Awards	6	8
Logie Award	0	1
National Television Awards	2	19
Royal Television Society	2	6
TV Quick & TV Choice Awards	1	17
Writers' Guild of Great Britain	1	1

Totals (Note: Certain award groups do not simply award one winner. They acknowledge several different recipients, have runners-up, and have third place. Since this is a specific recognition and is different from losing an award, runner-up mentions are considered wins in this award tally. For simplification and to avoid errors, each award in this list has been presumed to have had a prior nomination.)
- Wins: 17
- Nominations: 64

The Bill is a British police procedural television series that ran from 1983 to 2010. The show, whose name is derived from "old bill"—a British slang term for police officers—was unusual among police dramas in that it focused on the lives and work of one shift of police officers, rather than on any particular aspect of police work. The series originated in 1983 as a one-off drama titled Woodentop (another British slang term for the police, derived from the helmets worn by British police officers), written by Geoff McQueen and produced by Thames Television. ITV were sufficiently impressed with Woodentop that they commissioned a full series, which started in 1984 under the title of The Bill. From 2009 until the show's cancellation in 2010, the number of episodes was reduced to one episode a week in a post-watershed slot of 9pm which incorporated a new format and a new theme tune. At the time of the series' end on 31 August 2010 due to a drop in ratings, The Bill was the United Kingdom's longest-running police drama and was among the longest-running of any British television series, having run for almost 27 years.

The Bill has earned various awards and nominations during its run, with the nominations in categories ranging from Best Drama to its camera and editing work to the cast's acting performance. It received nominations for eight awards from the British Academy of Film and Television Arts, winning Best Video Cameraman in 1990 and Best Continuing Drama in 2009—an award for which it was unsuccessfully nominated in a further three years. In addition, The Bill enjoyed success at the Inside Soap Awards, where it won Best Drama six times, including four consecutive wins, as well as a nomination in 2010—losing to Waterloo Road. Other awards include a Writers' Guild of Great Britain award for Best Soap/Continuing Drama Series in 2008, Best Serial Drama at the Digital Spy Soap Awards of the same year and a nomination for Most Popular Overseas Drama at the 2005 Logie Awards. The Bill has also received multiple nominations at the EMMAs, National Television Awards, where it won Most Popular Drama in 1996 and 2004, and six Royal Television Society award nominations, having won awards in 2006 and 2008.

== Awards and nominations ==
=== British Academy of Film and Television Arts awards ===
Year	Category	Nominee	Result
1990	Best Video Cameraman	Roy Easton, Rolie Luker, Adrian J. Fearnley	Won
1990	Best VTR Editor	John Beech, Ray Ball, Laurie Bunce	Nominated
1991	Best Sound (Fiction)	Alan Lester, Paul Gartrell	Nominated
1994	Best Drama Series	Michael Chapman (Executive Producer)	Nominated
2005	Best Continuing Drama	The Bill	Nominated
2008	Best Continuing Drama	The Bill	Nominated
2009	Best Continuing Drama	The Bill	Won
2010	Best Continuing Drama	The Bill	Nominated

=== Ethnic Multicultural Media Academy Awards ===
Year	Category	Nominee	Result
2002	Best TV Actress	Diane Parish as DC Eva Sharpe	Won
2003	Best TV Actor	Cyril Nri as Superintendent Adam Okaro	Won
2003	Best TV Actress	Diane Parish as DC Eva Sharpe	Nominated

=== National Television Awards ===
Year	Category	Nominee	Result
1996	Most Popular Drama	The Bill	Won
1999	Most Popular Drama	The Bill	Nominated
2000	Most Popular Drama	The Bill	Nominated
2000	Most Popular Newcomer	Clara Salaman as DS Claire Stanton	Nominated
2001	Most Popular Drama	The Bill	Nominated
2002	Most Popular Newcomer	Diane Parish as DC Eva Sharpe	Nominated
2003	Most Popular Drama	The Bill	Nominated
2003	Most Popular Newcomer	Daniel MacPherson as PC Cameron Tait	Nominated
2004	Most Popular Drama	The Bill	Won
2005	Most Popular Drama	The Bill	Nominated
2005	Most Popular Actor	Alex Walkinshaw as Sergeant Dale "Smithy" Smith	Longlisted
2005	Most Popular Actor	Scott Maslen as DS Phil Hunter	Longlisted
2005	Most Popular Actress	Roberta Taylor as Inspector Gina Gold	Longlisted
2005	Most Popular Actress	Lisa Maxwell as DS Samantha Nixon	Longlisted
2005	Most Popular Newcomer	Chris Jarvis as PC Dan Casper	Longlisted
2007	Most Popular Drama	The Bill	Nominated
2008	Most Popular Drama	The Bill	Nominated
2008	Outstanding Drama Performance	Alex Walkinshaw as Sergeant Dale "Smithy" Smith	Nominated
2010	Most Popular Drama	The Bill	Nominated

=== Royal Television Society Awards ===
Year	Category	Nominee	Result
2004	Best Lighting, Photography and Camera – Multicamera Work	Camera team (live episode)	Nominated
2006	Best Sound Drama (live episode)	Alison Davis, Donna Wiffen, Sylvie Boden, John Osborne	Won
2006	Best Lighting, Photography and Camera – Multicamera Work (live episode)	Sylvie Boden, Christopher Davies, Tony Keene, Donna Wiffen	Nominated
2008	Best Soap or Continuing Drama	The Bill	Won
2009	Best Soap or Continuing Drama	The Bill	Nominated
2010	Best Soap or Continuing Drama	The Bill	Nominated

=== Inside Soap Awards ===
Year	Category	Nominee	Result
2002	Best Drama	The Bill	Won
2003	Best Drama	The Bill	Nominated
2004	Best Drama	The Bill	Won
2006	Best Drama	The Bill	Won
2007	Best Drama	The Bill	Won
2008	Best Drama	The Bill	Won
2009	Best Drama	The Bill	Won
2010	Best Drama	The Bill	Nominated

=== TV Quick & TV Choice Awards ===
Year	Category	Nominee	Result
2001	Best Loved Drama	The Bill	Nominated
2002	Best Loved Drama	The Bill	Nominated
2004	Best Actor	Cyril Nri (Superintendent Adam Okaro)	Nominated
2004	Best Actress	Connie Hyde (PC Cathy Bradford)	Nominated
2004	Best Loved Drama	The Bill	Won
2005	Best Actor	Todd Carty (PC Gabriel Kent)	Nominated
2005	Best Actress	Lisa Maxwell (DI Samantha Nixon)	Nominated
2005	Best Actress	Roberta Taylor (Gina Gold)	Nominated
2005	Best Loved Drama	The Bill	Nominated
2006	Best Actress	Roberta Taylor (Inspector Gina Gold)	Nominated
2006	Best Loved Drama Series	The Bill	Nominated
2007	Best Actor	Chris Simmons (DC Mickey Webb)	Nominated
2007	Best Actor	Alex Walkinshaw (Sergeant Dale "Smithy" Smith)	Nominated
2007	Best Actress	Lisa Maxwell (DI Samantha Nixon)	Nominated
2007	Best Actress	Gillian Taylforth (Sergeant Nikki Wright)	Nominated
2007	Best Actress	Roberta Taylor (Inspector Gina Gold)	Nominated
2007	Best Loved Drama Series	The Bill	Nominated

=== Other ===
Year	Award	Category	Nominee	Result
2005	Logie Award	Most Popular Overseas Drama	The Bill	Nominated
2008	Writers' Guild of Great Britain Award	Best Soap/Continuing Drama Series	The Bill	Won
2008	Digital Spy Soap Awards	Best Serial Drama	The Bill	Won
2009	Knights of Illumination	Drama Lighting	John O'Brien L.D. on The Bill	Won
