= Sam Callis =

British actor

- Born: Samuel Charles Callis; 21 November 1973 (age 52); Ely, Cambridgeshire, England
- Education: London Academy of Music and Dramatic Art
- Occupations: Actor, director
- Years active: 1996–present
- Spouse: Osmin Callis
- Children: 2

Samuel Charles Callis (born 21 November 1973) is an English actor and director, best known for his role as Callum Stone in The Bill and Adam Benjamin in London's Burning.

== Biography ==
Callis grew up in Haslemere, Surrey and attended Camelsdale Primary School, Midhurst Intermediate School and Midhurst Grammar School. Callis trained at the London Academy of Music and Dramatic Art. He has had roles in London's Burning where he played Adam Benjamin and in Ultimate Force as Captain Patrick Fleming. He played Doctor Mike Banner in The Royal until he left in 2007 to join the cast of The Bill. He has made appearances in Holby City, Casualty and Doctor Who.

Before joining The Bill as a regular, he had previously guest starred in the show in 2004 as an alcoholic priest, Karl Radford.

Callis has also acted in some films. In Kidulthood he played a security guard, in Spanish TV Movie Trance he played Nick, in Capital Punishment he played Russell Blake and he starred in Shrink as Max.

He has acted in theatre which has taken him to New York and on a UK no1 Tour for Arms and The Man.

After The Bill was cancelled in 2010, Callis directed a short film called Inside Run. The short film starred his former The Bill co-star Andrew Lancel as a prison officer and was shown at the BFI London Film Festival in October 2010. More recently he directed another short film, Viking also starring Andrew Lancel.

Callis played the role of Stensgard in the UK premiere of Henrik Ibsen's The League of Youth at Nottingham Playhouse in May 2011. In 2012 he appeared in the Noël Coward play Hay Fever at the Noël Coward Theatre and as Jack Worthing in The Importance of Being Earnest at Nottingham Playhouse.

In 2015 he produced Whisper, a ten-minute short film set in Sheppey.

== Personal life ==
He met his wife Osmin during his time on London's Burning and the couple reside in London. In December 2008, he became a father for the first time with the birth of his daughter. He also has a son. His brother, Ben Callis, is a film director.

== Filmography ==
=== Television ===
Year	Production	Role	Notes !
2021	The Lost Pirate Kingdom	Benjamin Hornigold	Netflix series, 6 episodes.
2020	The Outpost	Jaaris	'Dying Is Painful", Go Ahead and Run"
2019	Casualty	Albert "Big Al" Layne	TV series
2018	Father Brown	Alec Frobisher	Episode: "The Devil You Know"
2012	Midsomer Murders	Will Gideon	Episode: "Murder of Innocence"
2011	Game of Thrones	Goldcloak	'What Is Dead May Never Die" "The Night Lands"
2011	Holby City	Sean Foster	Episode: "Damage Control"
2007–2010	The Bill	Sgt. Callum Stone	TV series
2007	The Royal	Dr Mike Banner	TV series, 8 episodes
2006	Ultimate Force	Captain Patrick Fleming	TV series
2005	Holby City	Dave Stainford	Episode: "Pleasant Surprises"
2005	Doctor Who	Security Guard	Episode: "Bad Wolf"
2004	The Bill	Karl Radford	TV series
2001–2002	London's Burning	Adam Benjamin	TV series
2001	Beginner's Luck	Jackson	
2001	Holby City	Trevor Lake	Episode: "Men Are From Mars"
1996	The Bill	Mark Craven	Series 12, episode 124 "Out of the Past"

=== Released films ===
Year	Film	Role	Notes
2000	Shrink	Actor	Played Max
2001	Trance	Actor	Played Nick
2003	Capital Punishment	Actor	Played Russell Blake
2006	Kidulthood	Actor	Played Security Guard
2010	Inside Run	Director	
2015	Whisper	Producer	

=== Stage ===
Year	Production	Role
2011	The League of Youth	Stensgard
2012	Hay Fever	Sandy Tyrell
2012	The Importance of Being Earnest	Jack Worthing
2019	The Tempest	Prospero
2019	Henry V (play)	King of France
