= Faye Daveney =

British actress

- Born: 24 February 1993 (age 33)
- Occupation: Actress
- Years active: 2010 – present

Faye Daveney (born 24 February 1993) is a British actress best known for her roles as Zara Highway in EastEnders and Jasmine Harris in The Bill.

== Career ==
Daveney used to be with A&J Management. She is now with RKA Talent.

Daveney portrayed Jasmine Harris in the final two episodes of ITV's The Bill. Previous to appearing as Jasmine, Daveney also appeared in The Bill as a character called Sian.

Daveney has also appeared in The Assessment, a Shelter advertisement and Silent Witness.

In 2011, it was announced that she was to appear in the drama Fast Freddie, The Widow and Me which was aired by ITV in December 2011. In 2012 she appeared as Saskia in Broken, a drama film about a young girl who witnesses a violent assault. The film aired on BBC Two in 2015.

In 2014, she appeared as Nellie Short in an episode of Call the Midwife.

Since 2015, Daveney has been appearing in the BBC comedy Cradle to Grave.

In 2017, she played a character called Charity Walters in an episode of Holby City.

In September 2018, she appeared in EastEnders as Zara Highway.
