= David Harsent =

English poet

David Harsent (born in Devon on 9 December 1942) is an English poet who for some time earned his living as a TV scriptwriter and crime novelist.

== Background ==
During his early career he was part of a circle of poets centred on Ian Hamilton and forming something of a school, promoting conciseness and imagist-like clarity in verse, though his work has changed and developed a good deal since then.

He has published twelve collections of poetry which have won several literary prizes and awards. Legion won the Forward Prize for best collection 2005 and was shortlisted for both the T. S. Eliot and Whitbread Awards. Night (2012) was triple short-listed for major awards in the UK and won the Griffin International Poetry Prize. Fire Songs won the T. S. Eliot Prize in 2014. Sprinting from the Graveyard, his versions of poems written by the Bosnian poet Goran Simić, while under siege in Sarajevo, appeared in 1997 and was adapted to opera, radio and television. In Secret, his versions of Yiannis Ritsos, was published in 2012. His work in music theatre has involved collaborations with a number of composers (but most often with Sir Harrison Birtwistle) and has been performed at the Royal Opera House, Carnegie Hall, the Southbank Centre, The Proms, the Wiener Kammeroper, the Southbank Centre, the Aldeburgh Festival, the Holland Festival, and broadcast on BBC Two, Channel 4 and Trio (USA). The Minotaur (also with Birtwistle), opened at The Royal Opera House in 2008. Birtwistle once again turned to Harsent's words for his major song cycle Songs from the Same Earth (2012–13) and for the chamber operas The Corridor and The Cure.. The New York Times described Harsent and Birtwistle as a 'team creating alchemy'. Other words for music include operas Crime Fiction and In the Locked Room (music by Huw Watkins) and When She Died (music by Jonathan Dove), together with the song cycle Man Made: an early response to the climate crisis (music by Christian Mason) and an oratorio, The Judas Passion (music by Sally Beamish). Harsent is a Fellow of the Royal Society of Literature and Fellow of the Hellenic Authors Society. He was appointed Distinguished Writing Fellow at Sheffield Hallam University. In 2012 he was appointed Professor of Creative Writing at Bath Spa University. He left Bath Spa University in favour of The University of Roehampton in July 2013 after receiving an honorary degree.

He lives with his wife, the actress Julia Watson, and their daughter in Barnes, London.

== Television Scripts ==
- Goodnight Sweetheart (1993)
- Midsomer Murders (1997)
- Holby City (1999)

== Bibliography ==
- A Violent Country (1969)
- After Dark (1973)
- Truce (1973)
- Dreams of the Dead (1977)
- Mister Punch (1984)
- From an Inland Sea (1985)
- Savramena Britanska Poezija, editor with Mario Suško, (1988)
- Gawain: a libretto (1991)
- Storybook Hero (1992)
- News from the Front (1993)
- The Sorrow of Sarajevo, translations of poems by Goran Simić, illustrated by Robert McNab, (1996)
- Sprinting from the Graveyard, translations of poems by Goran Simić, (1997)
- A Bird’s Idea of Flight (1998)
- Another Round at the Pillars: A Festschrift for Ian Hamilton, editor, (1999)
- Marriage (2002)
- Raising the Iron, editor, (2004)
- Legion (2005)
- Selected Poems, 1969–2005 (2007)
- The Minotaur: a libretto (2008)
- Night (2011)
- Fire Songs (2014)
- Salt (2017)
- Loss (2020)

=== As David Lawrence ===
- The Chocolate Teapot (1992)
- The Dead Sit Round in A Ring (2002)
- Cold Kill (2005)
- The Dawn of Togetherness (2005)
- The Reward of Time (2007)
- Down into Darkness (2014)

=== As Jack Curtis ===
- Crows' Parliament (1987)
- Glory (1989)
- Sons of the Morning (1991)
- Conjure Me (1992)
- Mirrors Kill (1995)
- The Confessor (1997)
- Cold Kill (2014)
- Fox on the Run (2014)
- Nothing Like the Night (2014)

== Prizes and awards ==
- 1967 Eric Gregory Award
- 1970 Art Council Writer’s Award
- 1977 Geoffrey Faber Memorial Prize for Dreams of the Dead
- 1978 Art Council Writer’s Award
- 1988 Society of Authors Travel Award
- 1998 Forward Poetry Prize (Best Poetry Collection of the Year) (shortlist) for A Bird’s Idea of Flight
- 2002 T. S. Eliot Prize (shortlist) for Marriage
- 2002 Forward Poetry Prize (Best Poetry Collection of the Year) (shortlist) for Marriage
- 2005 Forward Prize — Best Poetry Collection of the Year for Legion
- 2005 T. S. Eliot Prize (shortlist) for Legion
- 2005 Whitbread Poetry Award (shortlist) for Legion
- 2007 Forward Poetry Prize (Best Single Poem) (shortlist) for The Hut in Question
- 2008 Griffin Poetry Prize (International shortlist) for Selected Poems, 1969–2005
- 2011 Costa Book Awards (Poetry), shortlist, Night
- 2012 Griffin Poetry Prize (International winner) for Night
- 2015 T. S. Eliot Prize (poetry) for Fire Songs
