= The Bill =

British police procedural television series (1984–2010)

- Title 1998–2009
- Genre: Crime drama; Police procedural; Soap opera (series 18-21)
- Created by: Geoff McQueen
- Starring: Main cast
- Theme music composer: Andy Pask and Charlie Morgan; Samuel Sim (2009–2010)
- Opening theme: "Overkill" (1984–2009)
- Composer: Simba Studios
- Country of origin: United Kingdom
- Original language: English
- No. of series: 26
- No. of episodes: 2,425 (list of episodes)

Production
- Executive producers: Lloyd Shirley (1984–1987); Peter Cregeen (1987–1989); Michael Chapman (1989–1998); Richard Handford (1998–2002); Chris Parr (2002); Paul Marquess (2002–2005); Johnathan Young (2005–2010)
- Production locations: South London (Colliers Wood/Mitcham), England
- Running time: 22–46 minutes
- Production companies: Thames Television (1983–2006); Talkback Thames (2006–2010)

Original release
- Network: ITV
- Release: 16 August 1983 – 31 August 2010

Related
- Bureau Kruislaan (1992–1995); Die Wache (1994–2006); Burnside (2000); MIT: Murder Investigation Team (2003–2005); Leipzig Homicide (2001–present)

The Bill is a British police procedural television series, broadcast on ITV from 16 October 1984 until 31 August 2010. The programme originated from a one-off drama, "Woodentop" (part of the Storyboard series), broadcast on 16 August 1983. ITV were so impressed with the drama that a full series was commissioned. The title originates from "Old Bill", a slang term for the police and show creator Geoff McQueen's original title for the series.

The Bill focuses on the lives and work of one shift of police officers of all ranks, and the storylines deal with situations faced by uniformed officers working on the beat, as well as plainclothes detectives. Producers initially wanted to replicate the "day in the life" feature of Woodentop, and made sure a police officer was featured in every single scene. The series later adopted a much more serialised approach, and a revamp in 2002 led to more of a soap-opera feel to many of its stories. The Bill began with a regular cast of 13 members, with only two of these being uniformed women. In total, 174 actors have formed part of the series' main cast.

Throughout its 26-year run, the programme was always broadcast on the main ITV channel. In later years, episodes of the show were repeated on ITV3 on their week of broadcast. The series has also been repeated on other digital stations, including UKTV Gold and Drama. It has been broadcast in more than 55 countries. The series has attracted controversy on several occasions. An episode broadcast in 2008 was criticised for featuring fictional treatment for multiple sclerosis. The series also faced more general criticism concerning its levels of violence, particularly prior to 2009, when it occupied a pre-watershed slot. The Bill, its cast and crew have won and been nominated for a number of awards, including BAFTAs and a Writers' Guild of Great Britain Award.

On 26 March 2010, following a spell of declining viewership and negative public and media reception, executives at ITV announced that the network did not intend to recommission The Bill and that filming would cease on 14 June 2010. The final episode, titled "Respect", aired on 31 August 2010. The Bill was the longest-running police procedural television series in the United Kingdom, and among the longest running of any British television series at the time of its cancellation.

== History ==
The Bill was originally conceived in 1983 by Geoff McQueen, then a new television writer, as a one-off drama. McQueen had originally titled the production Old Bill. It was picked up by Michael Chapman for ITV franchise holder Thames Television, who retitled it Woodentop as part of Thames's Storyboard series of one-off dramas and broadcast on ITV under the title Woodentop on 16 August 1983. Woodentop starred Mark Wingett as PC Jim Carver and Trudie Goodwin as WPC June Ackland of London's Metropolitan Police, both attached to the fictional Sun Hill police station.

Although originally intended as only a one-off, Woodentop so impressed ITV that a full series was commissioned, first broadcast on 16 October 1984 with one post-watershed episode per week, featuring an hour-long, separate storyline for each episode of the first three series. The first episode of the full series was "Funny Ol' Business – Cops & Robbers". With serialisation, the name of the show changed from Woodentop to The Bill. Series one had 11 episodes and was broadcast in 1984, series two and three had 12 episodes each and were broadcast in 1985–1986 and 1987 respectively. With a full ensemble cast to explore new characters not featured or just mentioned in Woodentop, the focus of the storylines soon shifted away from new recruit Carver and towards Detective Inspector Roy Galloway (John Salthouse) and Sergeant Bob Cryer (Eric Richard).

The series then changed to two 30-minute episodes per week, on Tuesdays and Thursdays in 1988 (from July 1988 onwards, and began being broadcast all year round without a summer break), increasing to three a week beginning in 1993, with the third episode being broadcast on Fridays. In 1998, The Bill returned to hour-long episodes, which later became twice-weekly, with the Friday episode being dropped, at which point the series adopted a much more serialised approach. When Paul Marquess took over as executive producer in 2002, as part of a drive for ratings, the series was revamped, bringing more of a soap-opera feel to many of its stories. Many veteran characters were written out, leading to the Sun Hill fire during 2002. Marquess stated that the clearout was necessary to introduce "plausible, powerful new characters". As part of the new serial format, much more of the characters' personal lives were explored but, as Marquess put it, the viewers still "don't go home with them". The change also allowed The Bill to become more reflective of modern policing, with the introduction of officers from ethnic minorities, most notably the new superintendent, Adam Okaro (Cyril Nri). It also allowed coverage of the relationship of gay Sergeant Craig Gilmore (Hywel Simons) and PC Luke Ashton (Scott Neal), a storyline which Marquess was determined to explore before rival Merseybeat.

In 2005, Johnathan Young took over as executive producer. The serial format was dropped and The Bill returned to stand-alone episodes with more focus on crime and policing than on the officers' personal lives. The year 2007 saw the reintroduction of episode titles, which had been dropped in 2002. In 2009, The Bill moved back to the 9 pm slot it previously held, and the theme tune, "Overkill", was replaced as part of a major overhaul of the series.

=== Cancellation ===
On 26 March 2010, ITV announced that it would be cancelling the series later that year after 27 years on air in 26 series. ITV said that this decision reflected the "changing tastes" of viewers. The last episode of The Bill was filmed in June 2010 and broadcast on 31 August 2010 followed by a documentary titled Farewell The Bill. Fans of the show started a Save The Bill campaign on Facebook to persuade ITV to reconsider the cancellation, and BBC Radio 1's Chris Moyles promoted the campaign on air.

At the time the series ended in August 2010, The Bill was the United Kingdom's longest-running police drama and was among the longest-running of any British television series. The series finale, "Respect", was aired in two parts and was dedicated to "the men and women of the Metropolitan Police Service past and present". The finale storyline concerned gang member Jasmine Harris being involved in the murder of fellow member Liam Martin who died in the arms of Inspector Smith (Alex Walkinshaw) after being stabbed. Jasmine is then gang raped because she talked to the police, and when Callum Stone (Sam Callis) found the person responsible he was held at gunpoint. Of the finale's title, executive producer Jonathan Young said "It's called "Respect" and we hope it will respect the heritage of the show". The finale episodes featured all the cast and the final scene was specially written so all cast members would be featured. The final character on screen was Superintendent Jack Meadows (Simon Rouse), by then the show's longest serving character, having first appeared in 1990; he is shown exiting the front door, getting in his car and driving off. Following the final episode, ITV aired a documentary entitled Farewell The Bill which featured interviews from past and present cast and crew members. The finale was watched by 4.4 million viewers, with Farewell The Bill averaging 1.661 million viewers.

=== Possible revival ===
On 17 April 2021, various media outlets began reporting that the series may be set for a reboot. Writer Simon Sansome was understood to have bought the rights to the original series, and was planning a revival, dubbed Sun Hill (as licensing meant the series could no longer be called The Bill), alongside Holby City creator and former EastEnders writer Tony McHale who had previously written episodes of The Bill and one of its spin-offs, Beech is Back. Sansome had been in talks with various cast members during a 2020 reunion and discussed possible appearances for show legends Mark Wingett (Jim Carver), Trudie Goodwin (June Ackland) and Graham Cole (Tony Stamp). However, no official date had been set for a return, nor had the mooted Sun Hill project been picked up by any TV network. On 18 April, Mark Wingett confirmed this on his Twitter account, stating they had been "approached" by production companies but the Sun Hill project had not been given the green light.

== Broadcasting and production ==
=== Filming locations ===
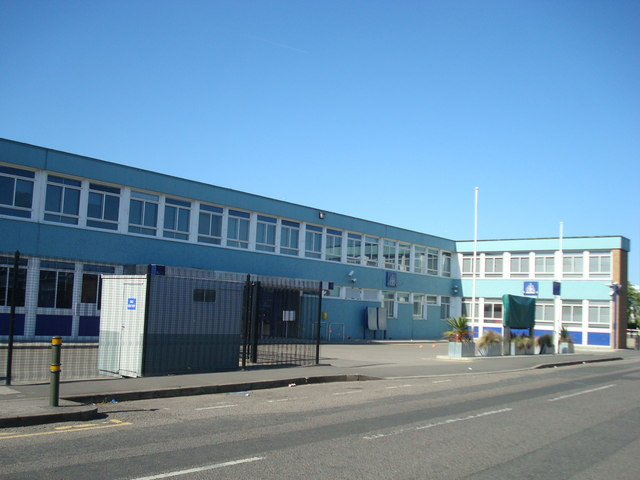
Exterior of the Merton studio where The Bill was filmed from 1990.

Throughout the series, there have been three filming locations for Sun Hill police station. From the first series, the police station consisted of a set of buildings in Artichoke Hill, Wapping, East London. However, these buildings were next to the News International plant and during the winter of 1985–86 there was much industrial action which resulted in some altercations between the strikers and actors working on The Bill who were mistaken for real officers. Working conditions got so dire that the production team realised they needed to find another base to set Sun Hill police station.

The second location was an old record distribution depot in Barlby Road, North Kensington in North West London. Filming began here in March 1987. In 1989, the owners of the Barlby Road site ordered The Bill out, owing to their redevelopment plans for the area. After an extensive search, two sites were selected, the favourite being a disused hospital in Clapham. However, this fell through and the second option was chosen—an old wine distribution warehouse in Merton, South West London. The move was made in March 1990 and was disguised on screen by the "ongoing" refurbishment of Sun Hill police station and then finally the explosion of a terrorist car-bomb in the station car-park, which ended up killing PC Ken Melvin.

Filming for the series took place all over London, mainly in South London and particularly the London Borough of Merton, where the Sun Hill set was located. Locations used when the show was filmed on a housing estate included:

- Cambridge Estate, in Kingston, south-west London
- High Path Estate, in South Wimbledon, south-west London (approx. 10-minute walk from the Sun Hill set)
- Alton Estate, in Roehampton, south-west London
- Phipps Bridge, Mitcham
- Roundshaw Estate in Wallington, London
- Sutton Estate, which includes Durand Close in Carshalton, where a housing block regularly used by The Bill for filming was demolished in November 2009.

Scenes were often filmed in east London, most notably the London Docklands, with other scenes filmed in Tooting, Greenwich and Croydon. In 2008, the episode "Demolition Girl" was filmed in The Gorbals, Glasgow.

The set of Sun Hill police station at Wimbledon Studios remained until mid 2013 when it was finally dismantled.

==== "Sun Hill" ====
The Bill is set in and around Sun Hill police station, in the fictional "Canley Borough Operational Command Unit" in East London. Geoff McQueen, creator of The Bill, claimed that he named Sun Hill after a street name in his home town of Royston, Hertfordshire.

The fictional Sun Hill suburb is located in the fictional London borough of Canley in the East End, north of the River Thames (Canley is the name of a real suburb of Coventry). The Borough of Canley is approximately contiguous to the real-life London Borough of Tower Hamlets, and in the first few years of The Bill, Sun Hill police station was actually stated as being located in Wapping in Tower Hamlets. Sun Hill has a London E1 postcode (the 'address' of Sun Hill police station is given as '2 Sun Hill Road, Sun Hill, Canley E1 4KM), which corresponds to the real-life areas of Whitechapel and Stepney.

=== Production details ===
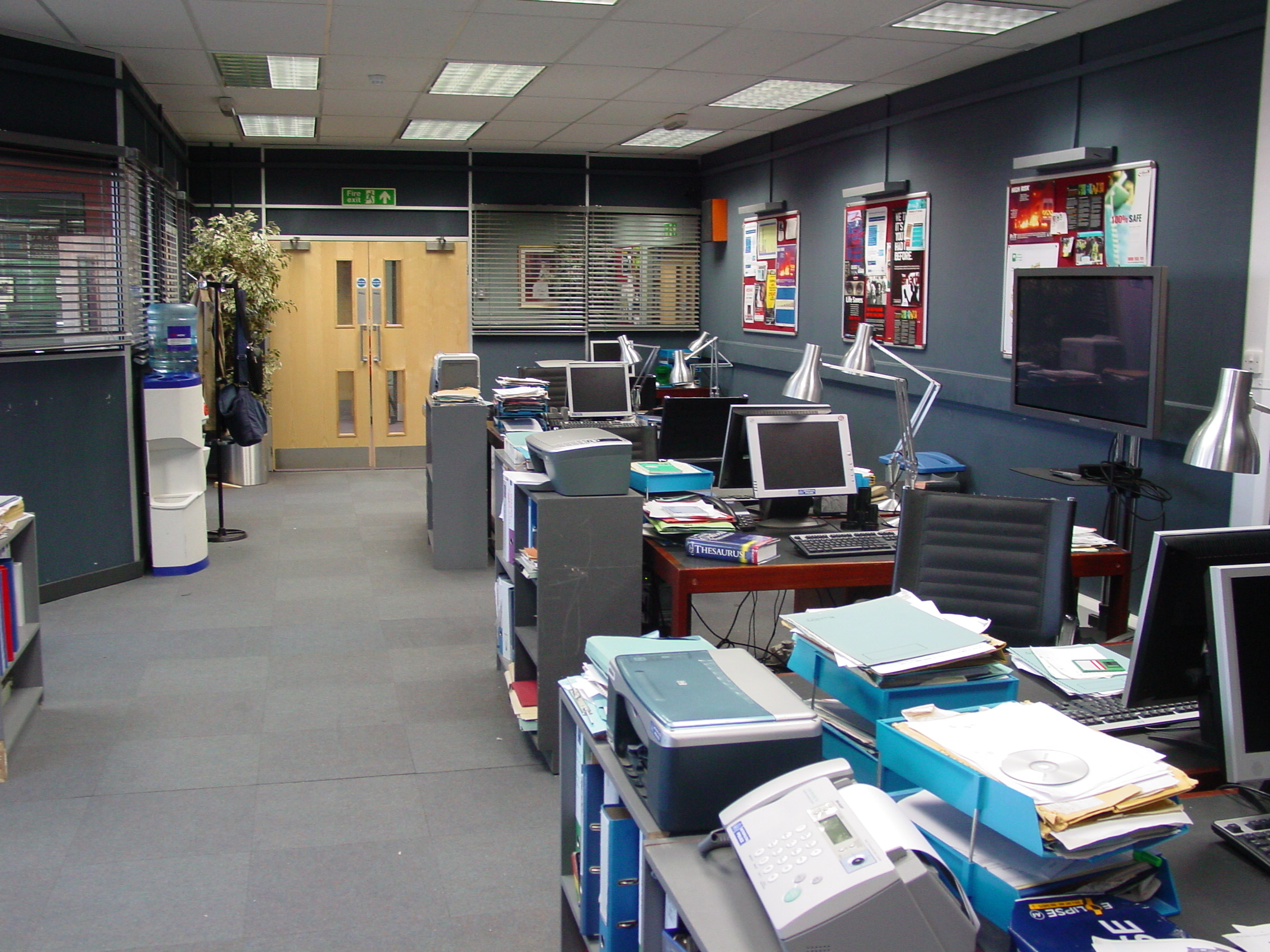
Set of the CID office in the Merton studios (now Wimbledon Studios)

When filming The Bill, some outdoor scenes were re-enacted indoors with microphones surrounding the actors and the extra sounds being "dubbed" on later. Some of the more aggressive scenes were also filmed indoors either for dubbing or safety reasons. The sirens used in the series were added later in the dubbing suite as The Bill did not have permission to use them while on location. However, the police uniforms used in the series were genuine, again making The Bill unique among police dramas. When the series ended, London's Metropolitan Police Service, after talks with the production company, bought 400 kilograms of police-related paraphernalia, including uniforms and body armour, to prevent them falling into the hands of criminals after the programme's production ceased. The Bill is unique amongst police dramas in that it takes a serial format, focusing on the work and lives of a single shift of police officers, rather than on one particular area of police work. Also unique is that The Bill adapted to this format after several series, whereas comparable series started with the serial format.

=== Broadcast in the United Kingdom ===
During its initial broadcast, The Bill was always shown on ITV. In 2009, STV, ITV's regional franchise in Central and Northern Scotland, opted out of broadcasting the series along with a number of other dramas, a decision that later became the subject of legal proceedings between STV and the main ITV network. The legal dispute was settled on 27 April 2011, with ITV receiving £18 million from STV.

Aside from repeats of episodes on ITV3, which occurred on the original week of their broadcast, the show has regularly been repeated on other digital stations. Re-runs of the series began on 1 November 1992, when new digital channel UKTV Gold began broadcasting. The channel broadcast repeats of the series for nearly 16 years, until 6 October 2008, when the channel was given a revamp by the owners of the network. During the 16-year period, re-runs of the series covered every episode broadcast between 16 October 1984, and 8 March 2007. Episodes have also been broadcast on British drama channel Alibi until 23 December 2009. On 27 January 2010, UKTV relocated The Bill to its entertainment channel Watch. In July 2013, the show began broadcasting on Drama, starting with episodes from 1998. Drama planned to air every episode from the beginning in 2017, but after a few weeks, the channel jumped to series 14. Every series of The Bill was in January 2024 added to the video-on-demand platform UKTV Play, which in June 2024 was renamed U.

=== Broadcast outside the UK ===
The Bill has been broadcast in more than 55 countries.

- In Australia, The Bill was shown on ABC1. The final episode was shown on 16 October 2010, with Farewell The Bill shown the following week on 23 October.
- In Denmark, the series was retitled "Lov og Uorden" (Law and Disorder). Two episodes of the series were broadcast every afternoon on TV2 Charlie.
- In Ireland, the series was broadcast on RTÉ television, first starting in the early 1990s on RTÉ Two, and in the early 2000s RTÉ began broadcasting it on RTÉ One at 5:30 pm each weekday, splitting hour long episodes into two-part half-hour episodes. RTÉ discontinued this in 2009, moving the show to Monday Nights on RTÉ Two. RTÉ showed episodes from 2005. In 2010, RTÉ moved the show from its prime time slot on RTÉ Two to a midnight slot on RTÉ One on Thursday nights, but the show remained on the RTÉ Player.
- In Sweden, the series was retitled "Sunhills polisstation" (Sun Hill Police Station) by broadcaster TV4. In 2011, it was broadcast daily on Kanal 9 in the early afternoon with a repeat early the following morning.
- In India, the series was aired on Star plus in 1995.
- In New Zealand, the series was aired in its entirety on TVNZ.

== Theme tune and title sequences ==
The first opening sequence of The Bill was featured in the first episode "Funny Ol' Business – Cops & Robbers". The sequence consisted of two police officers, one male and one female, walking down a street while images of Sun Hill were interspersed between them. The theme tune is called "Overkill" and was composed by Charlie Morgan and Andy Pask. The theme is notable for its use of septuple meter. It also features a guitar riff, with synthesizer, bass and drum accompaniment, with "middle-eight" sections performed on synthesizers. From the fourth series a melody line was added to the "Overkill" theme, also composed by Pask and Morgan. The end titles of the series simply showed the feet of the two police constables pounding the beat. On 6 January 1998, starting with "Hard Cash", the third episode of the show's 14th series, a new version of the theme and title sequence debuted.

On 20 February 2001, starting with "Going Under", the 14th episode of the show's 17th series, the previous opening and closing sequences were scrapped to make way for a completely new sequence and theme. This time, the opening sequence consisted of a montage image of the entire cast, backed by a darker, slower version of "Overkill". Vicky Frost of The Guardian was critical of the titles, writing "I remain to be convinced about these opening titles from 2001, with their jazzed-up theme tune, and shards of faces." On 26 February 2003, starting with Episode No. 091, the opening and closing sequences were once again updated. This time, the opening sequence consisted of several generic police images, such as a police car and uniform. A new arrangement of "Overkill", composed by Lawrence Oakley, was also used for both the opening and closing sequences.

On 3 January 2007, the opening and closing sequences were once again changed. This time, the opening sequence, for the first time, features an image of the Sun Hill sign, and returns to featuring images of officers in action. This sequence also featured a further new arrangement of "Overkill", once again arranged by Lawrence Oakley. On 23 July 2009, after the programme underwent a major overhaul, the opening sequence and theme tune were heavily changed. This time, the classic "Overkill" theme was completely removed, and a new theme created by Simba Studios was used. However, producer Jonathan Young stated that echoes of "Overkill" can still be heard in the theme. The opening sequence featured a patrol car driving through the streets of Sun Hill.

== Episodes ==
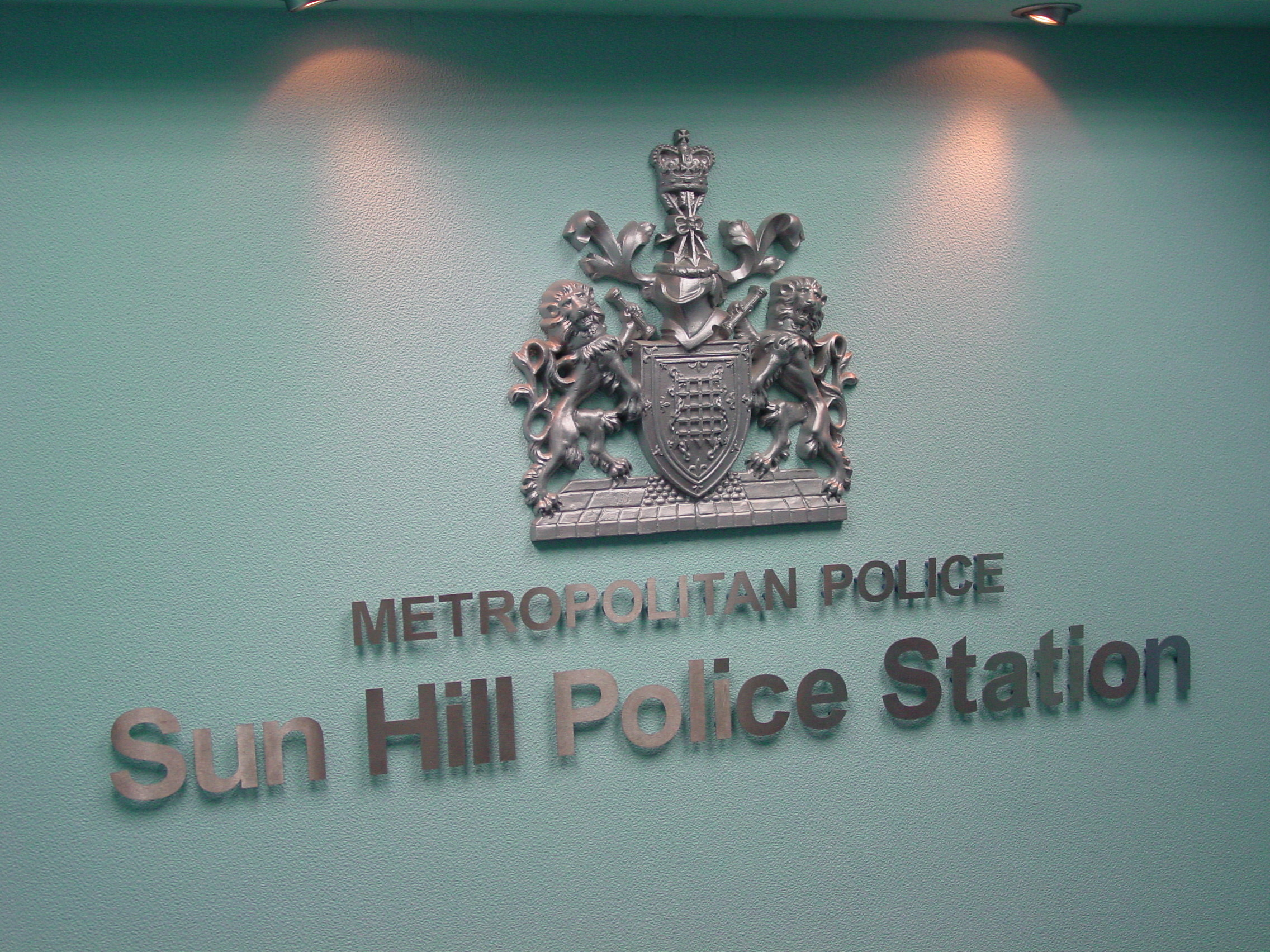
Metropolitan Police and station coat of arms from the Sun Hill set

When The Bill was first commissioned as a series by ITV, it started with 12 episodes per year, each an hour long with a separate storyline. In 1988, the format changed to a year-round broadcast with two 30-minute episodes per week. In 1993, this expanded to three 30-minute episodes per week. In 1998, the broadcast format changed to two one-hour episodes each week, also recording in 16:9 widescreen Digibeta. In 2009, The Bill began broadcasting in HD and as part of a major revamp, was reduced to broadcasting once a week. The Bill ceased broadcasting on 31 August 2010 after 2,425 episodes, owing to a decline in ratings.

In 2000, ITV broadcast a one-off episode called "The Trial of Eddie Santini" which concluded a long-running storyline between PC Eddie Santini (Michael Higgs) and WPC Rosie Fox (Caroline Catz). The following year, another one-off episode called "Beech on the Run" was filmed and set in Australia. It follows Claire Stanton's (Clara Salaman) pursuit of DS Don Beech (Billy Murray), who is wanted for the murder of DS John Boulton (Russell Boulter). Further episodes filmed overseas include 1999's "Foreign Body", which was filmed in France, and the two-part crossover episode "Proof of Life" with the German series Leipzig Homicide, which was filmed in Germany and broadcast in November 2008.

The Bill has broadcast two live episodes. The first "Fatal Consequences" aired on 30 October 2003 to celebrate the 20th anniversary of the pilot, Woodentop. The episode was produced with a crew of 200 staff including seven camera crews. It was reported to be the first live television broadcast of a programme where filming was not largely confined to a studio. The storyline centres on Detective Constable Juliet Becker (Rae Baker) and Constable Cathy Bradford (Connie Hyde) who are being held hostage by a man called Mark (Charles Dale) in a van in the station yard. The episode was watched by around 10 million viewers. "Fatal Consequences" was released onto DVD in the United Kingdom on 31 October 2011, as part of Network DVD's "Soap Box: Volume 1".

The second live episode "Confessions of a Killer" aired on 22 September 2005 to celebrate the 50th birthday of ITV. The episode features the departures of three officers, as a fire engulfs Sun Hill. The episode attracted more than nine million viewers, and was only the second time Computer-generated imagery had been used on the show, as creating a real fireball ripping through the station corridors was not possible.

=== Specials ===
A series of episodes titled The Bill Uncovered were produced to reflect the stories of select characters and events. The first was The Bill Uncovered : Des and Reg (2004) – The story of the unusual friendship between PC Des Taviner (Paul Usher) and PC Reg Hollis (Jeff Stewart), traversing their history from Des's first day at Sun Hill to his death in a Sun Hill cell. The second was The Bill Uncovered: Kerry's Story (2004), the story of PC Kerry Young (Beth Cordingly), who met her death outside Sun Hill. The third special was The Bill Uncovered : Jim's Story (2005), the story of DC Jim Carver (Mark Wingett) – from his first day at Sun Hill (in the pilot "Woodentop"). The last was The Bill Uncovered: On The Front Line (2006), in which Superintendent Adam Okaro (Cyril Nri) recounts the extraordinary events that have surrounded Sun Hill over his time in charge. A review of the second of these specials criticised the "increasingly degenerative plotlines" of the series, and characterised the special as a "cheerless outing" covering The Bill's "travesties of plot". All four editions of The Bill Uncovered were released on DVD in Australia as part of The Bill Series 26 DVD boxset on 30 April 2014.

To celebrate the show's 25th anniversary, a special programme The Bill Made Me Famous was broadcast in November 2008. Narrated by Martin Kemp, it features former actors and special guest stars discussing their time working on the show and how it changed their lives, including Paul O'Grady, Les Dennis, Michelle Collins, Pauline Quirke and Darren Day.

Immediately following the final episode, a one-hour special titled Farewell The Bill was broadcast on 31 August 2010. The special explored the history of the series and gave viewers a behind the scenes look at the filming of the last episode. This special was later released on DVD in Australia on 5 October 2011, along with the last two-part episode "Respect".

== Cast ==
The Bill had a large regular cast to support the number of episodes that were produced each year. Working on The Bill became something of a rite of passage in British acting, with 174 actors having formed part of the series' main cast since the series began. The constant need for minor characters, normally appearing in only a single episode, inevitably led to numerous guest roles in The Bill being played by actors and actresses who later achieved a high profile, some of whom appeared as child actors. These include Keira Knightley, James McAvoy, Ray Winstone and Sean Bean.

The original one-off episode Woodentop followed a day in the life of PC Jim Carver (Mark Wingett). It also featured WPC June Ackland (Trudie Goodwin). When a full series of The Bill was commissioned, producers wanted to replicate the "Day in the Life" feature and made sure a police officer was in every single scene. When the series began, there were 13 regular cast members. Only two of these were uniformed women – WPCs June Ackland and Viv Martella (Nula Conwell). There were no female characters in the Criminal Investigation Department (CID). The show's first black police officer PC Abel Lyttleton (Ronny Cush) was introduced in 1985. In 2002, new executive producer Paul Marquess introduced a "serialised, almost soap-opera style" with episodes focusing more on the officers' personal lives. Marquess also wrote out a number of characters during a fire in the station. He then introduced several new characters to the show, including PC Kerry Young (Beth Cordingly), Inspector Gina Gold (Roberta Taylor), and DC Ken Drummond (Russell Floyd). The longest serving cast members were Trudie Goodwin and Jeff Stewart (PC Reg Hollis), who starred in more than 900 episodes, and Graham Cole (PC Tony Stamp) who starred in 1,112 episodes.

=== Notable cast members ===
The following list contains characters whose roles transformed the series, and in some cases led to spin-offs, as well as characters who hold individual accolades for their time on the series.

- Billy Murray played Don Beech from 1995 to 2000. The character was a corrupt detective sergeant whose notoriety in the role led to its own scandal, with the defining moment being his killing of fellow DS John Boulton (Russell Boulter). Beech later featured in a 90-minute special Beech on the Run, filmed in Australia, and led to the six-part Beech is Back spin-off, both of which aired in 2001. His final stint on the series came in 2004 when he made six appearances as a prisoner turned informant as part of an elaborate scheme that saw him escape from prison.
- Tony O'Callaghan played Sergeant Matt Boyden from 1991 to 2003. Boyden's murder at the hands of his daughter's boyfriend formed the basis for the pilot of spin-off M.I.T.: Murder Investigation Team.
- Diane Parish as DC Eva Sharpe was the only character to appear as a regular cast member on both The Bill (2002–2004) and the M.I.T.: Murder Investigation Team spin-off (2005).
- Christopher Ellison played Frank Burnside from 1984 to 2000. Burnside was a recurring character as a DS in the early years before becoming Sun Hill's DI in 1988, a role he held for five years. After a five-year absence, Burnside returned as a DCI with the National Crime Squad before being written out in 2000 to star in his own spin-off, Burnside; however, it lasted for just one series before being cancelled. Burnside made many enemies both at Sun Hill and with the villains; indeed, Chief Superintendent Pearson (Adam Bareham) tried to frame Burnside in a corruption inquiry.
- Mark Wingett played Jim Carver from 1983 to 2005, appearing in 780 episodes. Jim was the central protagonist in the pilot Woodentop, the episode centred around his first day at Sun Hill as a probationary PC. A promotion to DC in 1988 saw him in CID until 1999, when he was transferred back to uniform so the series could highlight the real-life Metropolitan Police's controversial tenure system that saw officers moved back to uniform if they were not considered for promotion after ten years in the same role. He went through an addiction to alcohol, domestic abuse and a gambling addiction. He returned in 2007 for June Ackland's final episodes.
- Trudie Goodwin portrayed June Ackland from 1983 to 2007. She initially appeared as a WPC (now an obsolete rank) in the pilot, puppywalking Jim Carver on his first day on the job. She was promoted to sergeant in 1996 and held that rank until her exit in 2007. Her time in the role broke a world record for the longest time an actor had portrayed a police officer.
- Eric Richard played Sergeant Bob Cryer from 1984 to 2001, making him the longest serving sergeant on the series. Richard was the highest paid and second-longest serving actor on the series. His character was written out after he was accidentally shot by PC Dale Smith (Alex Walkinshaw). The character later made brief re-appearances between 2002 and 2004.
- Kevin Lloyd played DC Tosh Lines from 1988 to 1998. The character was written out as having accepted a position in the Coroner's Office after Lloyd was sacked for turning up for work drunk. Lloyd died a week after his dismissal, meaning he appeared on screen for over a month after his death.
- Jeff Stewart played PC Reg Hollis from 1984 to 2008, which made him the character with the longest run on the series. The character was seen as the station "odd-ball" and took part in several major plots, including being injured in the 1990 station fire and forming an unlikely friendship with PC Des Taviner (Paul Usher). Reg was written out off-screen after Stewart reportedly cut his wrists in his dressing room after being informed his contract would not be renewed.
- Graham Cole played PC Tony Stamp from 1987 to 2009, having been an uncredited extra from 1984 to 1987. The character was key to several major plots throughout the series including killing a pedestrian on duty and being accused of sexual assault on a minor. When the series revamped in 2009 he was written out after 1204 credited appearances, more than any other character in the series history. The character took up a driving instructor's post at Hendon after being the show's primary advanced driver since his debut.
- Alex Walkinshaw played Dale "Smithy" Smith from 1999 to 2010. He joined as a PC in 1999 before being written out in 2001. He returned as a sergeant in 2003 before a promotion to inspector in 2009, making him the only character on the series to play a regular role in all three ranks below the top brass positions.
- Simon Rouse played Jack Meadows from 1992 to 2010. He joined as a recurring cast member in 1990 when he was a detective superintendent with AMIP (Area Major Investigation Pool), later renamed MIT (Murder Investigation Team). His demotion to DCI in 1992 saw him take over the post at Sun Hill, holding the rank until 2009 when he was promoted back to superintendent. He was the longest serving character by the series finale and appeared in 884 episodes, recording more appearances than any other senior officer.
- Colin Tarrant played Inspector Andrew Monroe for more than 500 episodes from 1990 to 2002. Monroe was Sun Hill's third most senior officer and did things "by the book". He was written out as part of a series overhaul in the Sun Hill Firebombing storyline that also saw the exit of five other regular cast members.

== Ratings ==
The Bill was a popular drama in the United Kingdom and in many other countries, most notably in Australia.

The series attracted audiences of up to six million viewers in 2008 and 2009. Ratings during 2002 peaked after the overhaul of the show which brought about the 2002 fire episode, in which six officers were killed, and the 2003 live episode attracted 10 million viewers – 40% of the UK audience share. Immediately following The Bill's revamping and time slot change, it was reported that the programme had attracted 4.5 million viewers, 19% of the audience share, but it lost out in the ratings to the BBC's New Tricks, with the Daily Mirror later reporting that ITV's schedule change was behind a two million viewer drop in ratings.

In 2001, prior to Paul Marquess's appointment as executive producer, ratings had dropped to approximately six million viewers, and advertising revenues had fallen, in part owing to the ageing demographic of its viewers, leading ITV to order a "rejuvenation", which saw the series adopt a serial format.

In 2002, The Independent reported that The Bill's Thursday episode was viewed by approximately 7 million people, a fall of approximately 3 million viewers in the space of six months. After the cast clearout resulting from the Sun Hill fire in April 2002, BBC News reported that the show attracted 8.6 million viewers, the highest figure for the year to that point, and by October 2003, the programme had around 8 million viewers each week.

In 2005, The Bill was averaging around 11 million viewers, in comparison to Coronation Street, which was attracting around 10 million viewers.

In 2009, The Daily Mirror reported that The Bill was to be moved to a post-watershed slot to allow it to cover grittier storylines. It was reported that it was the first time in British Television that ITV had broadcast a drama all year in the 9 pm slot. The changeover happened at the end of July 2009. Before the move, the programme was averaging 5 million viewers between the two episodes each week. BARB reported that the week of 12–18 October 2009 saw 3.78 million viewers watch the show.

== Awards ==
The Bill has achieved a number of awards throughout its time on air, ranging from a BAFTA to the Royal Television Society Awards. and the Inside Soap Awards, particularly the Best Recurring Drama category.

In 2010, The Bill was nominated for a Royal Television Society award for Best Soap/Continuing Drama, beating both Coronation Street and Emmerdale onto the nominations list. The only soap to be nominated was EastEnders and the results were announced on 16 March 2010. In 2009 an episode of The Bill won the Knights of Illumination Award for Lighting Design- Drama.

== Impact and history ==
It has been compared to Hill Street Blues owing to the similar serial format that both series take. However, The Bill saw little direct competition on British television in the police procedural genre over its 25-year history, though the BBC launched several rival series, with varying degrees of success: The first was in 1990–91 when two series of Waterfront Beat were produced for the BBC by Phil Redmond. In 1995–96, two series of Out of the Blue were produced, but failed to gain significant ratings. In 1998 came City Central, which lasted for three series, until being cancelled in 2000. Next was Merseybeat, which began airing in 2001, but was cancelled in 2004 owing to poor ratings and problems with the cast. HolbyBlue, launched in 2007, was a spin-off of successful medical drama Holby City (itself a spin-off of the long-running Casualty). It was scheduled to go "head to head" with The Bill, prompting a brief "ratings war" but, in 2008, HolbyBlue was also cancelled by the BBC, again largely owing to poor ratings.

When The Bill started, the majority of the Police Federation were opposed to the programme, claiming that it portrayed the police as a racist organisation, but feelings towards the programme later mellowed, to the extent that, in 2006, executive producer Johnathan Young met Sir Ian Blair, then Commissioner of the Met, and it was decided that the editorial relationship between the police and the programme was sufficient. However, Young stressed that The Bill was not "editorially bound" to the police.

Despite better relations with the police, The Bill was still not without controversy. It was sometimes criticised for the high levels of violence, especially prior to 2009, when it occupied a pre-watershed timeslot. Specific story lines also came under fire in the media, such as that involving a gay kiss in 2002, as well as an episode broadcast in March 2008 which featured a fictional treatment for multiple sclerosis, leading the MS Society to brand the plot "grossly irresponsible".

== Spin-offs and related series ==
The Bill spawned several spin-off productions, as well as related series in German and Dutch.

- Burnside: Spin-off from the main British series, following ex-DI Frank Burnside in his transfer and promotion to the National Crime Squad. The programme lasted for just a single series of six episodes, debuting in the UK on 6 July 2000.
- MIT: Murder Investigation Team: Spin-off from the main British series. Lasting for two series, the drama began with a group of MIT officers investigating the drive-by shooting of Sgt. Matthew Boyden, who had been at Sun Hill for eleven years. The first series consisted of eight one-hour episodes. The second series consisted of four ninety-minute episodes. The series was created by Paul Marquess, produced by Johnathan Young and starred ex-Bill DC Eva Sharpe (Diane Parish).
- Bureau Kruislaan: Dutch interpretation of the series. Produced by Joop van den Ende for VARA Television, the programme lasted for four series running from 1992 to 1995. In 1995, the show was nominated for the Gouden Televizier Ring, an award for the best television programme in the Netherlands. All four series of the show have been released on DVD there.
- Die Wache: German interpretation of the series. As decent script-writers were hard to find at the time, the German producers were given the licence to use (re-use) scripts from the British series. The series was produced by RTL Television, running for nearly 250 episodes from 1994 to 2006.

== Merchandise ==
=== Books ===
Title	Author	Year	Publisher	ISBN
The Bill: Annual	Geoff McQueen	1989	Grandreams	ISBN 978-0-86227-675-1
The Bill: The Inside Story Of British Television's Most Successful Police Series (Retitled The Bill: The Inside Story Of The Most Successful Police Series Ever Seen On ABC TV for Australian publication)	Tony Lynch	1991 (Hardback); 1992 (Paperback)	Boxtree	ISBN 978-0-7333-0196-4
The Bill: The First Ten Years	Hilary Kingsley	1994 (Hardback); 1995 (Paperback)	Boxtree	ISBN 978-1-85283-957-4
The Bill: The Inside Story	Rachel Silver	1999	HarperCollins	ISBN 978-0-00-257137-1
Burnside: The Secret Files	K. M. Lock	2000	HarperCollins	ISBN 978-0-00-710719-3
The Bill: The Complete Low-Down On 20 Years At Sun Hill (Retitled The Bill: The Official History of Sun Hill for copies published in 2004	Geoff Tibballs	2003 (Hardback); 2004 (Paperback)	Carlton Books	ISBN 978-1-84442-985-1
The Bill: The Official Case Book	Geoff Tibballs	2006	Carlton Books	ISBN 978-0-7333-1874-0

==== Novels ====
Starting in 1985, author John Burke wrote a series of novelisations of select episodes.

Title	Author	Year	Publisher	ISBN	Episode
The Bill 1	John Burke	1985	Thames Mandarin	ISBN 978-0-7493-0277-1	Adapted select episodes of Series 1 (1985)
The Bill 2	John Burke	1987	Thames Mandarin	ISBN 978-0-7493-0278-8	Adapted select episodes of Series 2 (1986)
The Bill 3	John Burke	1989	Thames Mandarin	ISBN 978-0-7493-0002-9	Adapted select episodes of Series 4 (1988)
The Bill 4	John Burke	1990	Thames Mandarin	ISBN 978-0-7493-0374-7	Adapted select episodes of Series 5 (1989)
The Bill 5	John Burke	1991	Thames Mandarin	ISBN 978-0-7493-0842-1	Adapted select episodes of Series 5 (1989)
The Bill 6	John Burke	1992	Thames Mandarin	ISBN 978-0-7493-1178-0	Adapted select episodes of Series 6 (1990)
The Bill Omnibus	John Burke	1992	Thames Mandarin	ISBN 978-0-7493-1388-3	Adapted select episodes of Series 1–4 (1984–1988)
The Bill: Tough Love	Dave Morris	1997	Puffin	ISBN 978-0-14-038516-8	Adapted from the Series 12 (1996) episode
The Bill: Junior	Dave Morris	1997	Puffin	ISBN 978-0-14-038515-1	Adapted from the Series 12 (1996) episode

=== Music ===
Release title	Publisher and year	Format	Song included
The Bill Overkill by Morgan Pask	Columbia Records (1985)	"7" Vinyl	Side A – Overkill and Side B -Rock Steady
Greatest TV Themes: The 90s	CHV Music Factory (19 July 2010)	Mp3 download	Overkill

== See also ==
- Hill Street Blues
- Holby Blue
- NYPD Blue
- "Woodentop" (Storyboard)
