= History of The Bill =

From the ITV police drama's first screening in 1983, the history of The Bill includes a variety of major plotlines and changes to the programme's format.

== 1983: pilot ==
During 1983, Thames Television broadcast a one-off drama called "Woodentop". It was written by Geoff McQueen, who had previously worked on LWT's The Gentle Touch. "Woodentop" followed Police Constable Jim Carver (Mark Wingett) on his first day at Sun Hill Police Station, mentored by Woman Police Constable June Ackland (Trudie Goodwin). The production was seen as innovative for the use of natural lighting, hand-held cameras and an authentic portrayal of British policing. "Woodentop" was directed by Peter Cregeen, who had played a part in Z-Cars and Juliet Bravo. Thames Television commissioned 12 further episodes for transmission in 1984, which would relaunch under the title of The Bill.

== 1984–1987: "The Originals" ==
The first episode of The Bill was broadcast at 9 pm, on 16 October 1984. From the pilot episode, the actors who portrayed Carver, Ackland, Litten and Morgan (renamed to Edwards) were retained. The character of Detective Inspector Roy Galloway was also retained from the pilot, but was recast to be played by John Salthouse. Several new characters were introduced, such as Sergeant Bob Cryer (replacing Sergeant Bob Wilding from the pilot after actor Peter Dean joined the BBC soap EastEnders for its pilot year), Detective Sergeant Tommy Burnside (later changed to Frank) and Chief Superintendent Charles Brownlow.

Early episodes of The Bill had a duration of fifty minutes, with thirty-five being produced over the first three series of The Bill. The fifty-minute episodes were broadcast post-watershed, allowing the programme to include scenes of nudity, drug use, violence and swearing. The early series was considered to be realistic of how the police operated, with Geoff McQueen's focus on the mundane and the ordinary aspects of a police station, such as filling in forms and paperwork. The investigations displayed in each episode would vary from muggings and domestics, to bomb scares and armed robbery.

== 1988–1998: Half-hour episodes and move to pre-watershed ==
During 1988, the decision was made by Thames Director of Programmes to change the broadcast from a weekly hour-long episode to two half-hour episodes. The programme was also moved to pre-watershed rather than post-, significantly curbing bad language and violence. It also became a year-round programme, with the first full year due to be 1989. The new format aired on 19 July 1988, and aired weekly at least once (unless a scheduling change disrupted them) from that date right up to its finale on 31 August 2010.

During 1989, Peter Cregeen left ITV to work for the BBC and was replaced by Michael Chapman. Meanwhile, the owners of the set of Sun Hill Police Station set in Barlby Road – where production moved in 1987 after the News International protests at the original Wapping site disrupted filming – decided to renovate the building. This caused Thames Television to look for a new area to host the filming of the police station and selected a disused hospital in Clapham, but this did not go ahead. Instead, Thames settled for an old wine warehouse in Merton industrial estate, near Wimbledon, South London. The move was accounted for by a station fire in 1990 that killed off PC Ken Melvin, who was the first confirmed main character death on the series since it began; however, PC Pete Ramsey was presumed dead after he was shot in his final episode, "Don't Like Mondays", a year earlier.

In 1991, the Rover SD1 area car used in the title sequence was replaced by the new Ford Sierra; however, the design remained the same – a siren splitting up scenes of various characters from the programme. In 1993, the continued success of the programme led to ITV changing from two 30-minute episodes a week to three. However, the year came with some cast upheaval as Nula Conwell (WDC Viv Martella), Tony Scannell (DS Ted Roach) and Chris Ellison (DI Frank Burnside) all exited the series, having been with the show since its first regular episode in 1984. Burnside, who had been a sporadic character between 1984 and 1988, would later return in a recurring role in 1998 for two years. Roach was dismissed from his post on screen but returned for a cameo in 2000, while Martella was killed off, becoming the first CID and female character to make a fatal exit. In 1994, the show celebrated its 10th anniversary in October. The special anniversary episodes that week followed Detective Inspector Sally Johnson in court charged with manslaughter after a drug user had died during a police raid. In July that year, series creator and writer Geoff McQueen died at the age of 46.

During 1997, The Bill underwent a series of changes. At the end of 1996, the Ford Sierra area car in the opening title sequence was replaced with the programme's new Vauxhall Vectra (despite the Vectra not appearing in any scenes until the summer). This led to the first "night" title sequence being introduced in January 1997, used for episodes set during night shifts, with character images changed from the regular "daytime" clips. Later in the year The Bill's ratings were challenged by BBC One, which introduced a number of docusoaps such as Driving School. Michael Chapman resigned from his role of executive producer after eight years, being succeeded by Richard Handford, with Chapman's last episode as EP airing on 31 December 1997, titled "Things That Go Bump in the Night".

== 1998–2002: Hour-long episodes return ==
After Handford's debut as producer in January 1998, the original foundations of Geoff McQueen's writing were relaxed as he opted for a mix of police drama and exploring the private lives of the cast, but it remained that an incident would not be seen without a member of cast involved – sticking to McQueen's original mantra of the viewer "doesn't go home with the characters". The old title sequences were entirely removed, in favour of displaying things that are seen to be associated with policing, such as reflective jackets, a suspect being interviewed, and a map in the CAD room. The theme tune was also revamped, with a change from the irregular time signature. A major off-screen tragedy marred Handford's debut year on the series when actor Kevin Lloyd died on 2 May, mere days after he was dismissed after ten years in the role of DC Tosh Lines for showing up to work drunk and for not memorising his lines. In August 1998, The Bill returned to its original format of hour-long episodes, airing twice weekly. Serialisation was also brought in sporadically with some plots running the course of three or four episodes alongside standalone, one-episode plots; they include experienced PC Tony Stamp accidentally killing a pedestrian with the area car, and PC Eddie Santini attempting to rape WPC Rosie Fox before bullying her out of Sun Hill.

In 1999, serialisation went beyond multi-part plots as personal crises lasted weeks and months, such as PC Jim Carver's battle with alcoholism, and PC Dave Quinnan's love triangle with PC George Garfield and Nurse Jenny Delaney lasting for several months. 1999 also saw the series film outside the UK for the first time, the episode Foreign Body being filmed in France.

In 2000, the programme witnessed one of the largest cast changes in its history; the core of this was DS Don Beech's corrupt activities being exposed in the Don Beech Scandal. The scandal was long-running after his corruption was hinted at in plots during his 5-year spell on the series, but it reached a denouement when Beech was exposed by fellow DS and undercover Complaints Investigation Bureau (CIB) officer Claire Stanton, the peak of the month-long plot coming when Beech accidentally killed DS John Boulton in a fight. Following the suspension of the entire CID team, enforced transfer of three officers and the resignation of Ch Supt Charles Brownlow, Beech fled to Australia at the plot's conclusion; however, it was revisited a year later in the spin-off Beech is Back, which also included a 90-minute special episode filmed in Sydney. The first episode after the Beech scandal concluded, On the Hook: Part 1, saw a series record (barring the pilot and first episode of the series proper) for the most new characters introduced in a single episode (6).

In 2001, Eric Richard became the second original character in as many years to be axed (after Peter Ellis as Ch Supt Brownlow); his character Sergeant Bob Cryer was forced into early retirement after he was mistakenly shot during an armed siege by PC Dale Smith, who had recently transferred to SO19 as Alex Walkinshaw exited the series. Cryer was replaced by the first gay officer on the series, Sergeant Craig Gilmore. 2001 also saw the second change to the title sequence in three years, with static photos of the cast replacing the previous images of police systems, while the music was remixed to include the "Overkill" theme tune, last featured in 1988. The series was also broadcast in widescreen ratio for the first time.

== 2002–2005: Serial format ==
Executive producer Richard Handford left the show at the start of 2002, being replaced on a temporary basis by Chris Parr. In February, Paul Marquess became Handford's successor, changing the format of the series to a serialised, soap opera-style system; he also dropped on-screen episode titles for the first time, which did not return until 2007. Marquess had previously worked on Brookside and used similar methods to his time on that series, notably axing a large percentage of the cast including veterans Ben Roberts (Ch Insp Derek Conway) and Colin Tarrant (Insp Andrew Monroe). Their characters were among ten killed off in 2002, more than the total number in the entire series history (nine between 1984 and 2001). Six of the ten characters were killed off in the 2002 station fire, which also led to a major redevelopment of the station set; the CID office was overhauled and the management offices were reduced to accommodate a Community Safety Unit (in keeping with the department's integration to the real-life Metropolitan Police). The move proved controversial but did boost ratings after a decline prior to Marquess arriving, while it allowed him to bring a wide array of new characters. Marquess was highly progressive in representing modern views, casting the first lesbian officer in PC Gemma Osbourne and the show's highest-ranking black officer in Supt Adam Okaro, among others. The series also aired groundbreaking scenes such as the first gay and lesbian kisses, as well as a gay wedding in 2005.

Under Marquess, The Bill aired grittier and harrowing plots for officers individually including a crack addiction for PC Nick Klein, a male rape for DC Mickey Webb and a cot death for Sergeant Sheelagh Murphy. A trait Marquess succeeded with during his time on the series was casting actors never seen as villains in their careers such as Todd Carty as PC Gabriel Kent and Lynda Bellingham as crime boss Irene Radford. However, there were issues with repetition such as two station fires, two serial killer cops in the aforementioned Gabriel Kent and PC Cathy Bradford, non-cop serial killer plots in 2002, 2004 and 2005, more than half a dozen different characters being abducted (some more than once) and a slew of romances (something rarely seen prior to Marquess's arrival). Arguably, the most controversial storyline was the insinuation that show veteran Sergeant June Ackland had slept with her own son after PC Gabriel Kent falsely claimed he was her long-lost son (actually proving to be her son's adoptive brother). June actress Trudie Goodwin criticised the plot in a 2018 interview on The Bill Podcast, calling it far-fetched to introduce the element of a long-lost child 20 years into her time on the series, while she also cited issues with character exits and the direction the show was going when she resigned from the role of June after more than 20 years, stating she had lost her enjoyment of being on the programme. The mass dismissals included established show stars such as Tony O'Callaghan as Sergeant Matt Boyden and Mark Wingett as DC Jim Carver.

In 2003, a live episode of The Bill was broadcast to commemorate the 20th anniversary since the pilot episode, "Woodentop". The episode showcased two coinciding plots, one a siege in the station's rear yard that saw DC Juliet Becker fatally stabbed and the other plot concluded the disappearance of PC Gary Best's father Alan (Ian Puleston-Davies) with his tragic death, leading to an ambitious but successful live stunt in which Gary actor Ciaran Griffiths fell off the station roof in a struggle with his father's killer.

2005 saw the third station fire and second since Marquess arrived to account for redevelopment to the station's front end, including the reception area; DC Ken Drummond, undercover journalist PC Andrea Dunbar and receptionist Marilyn Chambers were all killed off as a result of the fire. In September 2005, Paul Marquess was signed away by Endemol to head their new drama division and was replaced by Johnathan Young, who previously produced series spin-off Murder Investigation Team. Soon after his arrival, a second live episode aired to celebrate ITV1's 50th anniversary. The episode saw a desperate father hold several officers hostage at gunpoint after being angered by a teenage joyrider who killed his son in a car crash avoiding a charge of death by dangerous driving; a car crash and an explosion aired as live stunts in the 2005 episode.

== 2005–2009: Young's tenure pre-revamp ==
Following his arrival in 2005, Johnathan Young reduced the number of personal and sensational storylines, and shifted the programme's focus to more crime-based stories. Similar to Richard Handford in the late 1990s and early 2000s, Young's plots were a mix of crime-based policing drama and personal issues, although they normally stemmed from policing, such as DC Zain Nadir falling for his target Kristen Shaw while working undercover with a gang of drug runners. Young also approached more controversial yet modern plots that were not seen as often under his predecessors, some of the most notable exploring far-right extremism, human trafficking and online grooming, while the viewpoint of victims was more prevalent – although the stories were predominantly from the police perspective as a unit – rather than a single officer as was seen in the Marquess episodes. Episode titles were reintroduced beginning with Episode #490, Sweet Revenge, broadcast on 21 March 2007. A spokesperson for the programme commented on how the titles summed up the "essence" of an episode. The return of episode titles followed a title sequence change on 3 January 2007, paying homage to the original 1984 titles by featuring shots of London, interspersed with police work and shots of Sun Hill Police Station; the break bumpers and music were also updated. By that time, the serial format was largely dropped and stories became more self-contained, with those that were serialised broadcast over two or three episode blocks. Young axed a number of fringe characters in his first year such as civilian staff and non-police officer characters, along with those he felt lacked the longevity required for the series including PC Steve Hunter, DC Suzie Sim and Superintendent Adam Okaro. However, the decision to axe PC Reg Hollis after 24 years in 2008 proved highly controversial, and led the character's devastated actor Jeff Stewart to attempt suicide. 2008 also saw the series celebrate its 25th anniversary with Proof of Life, a crossover with German drama Leipzig Homicide.

== 2009–2010: Grittier drama and return to primetime slot ==
In 2009, the show moved to a 9 pm broadcast with only one episode a week, and the format also received significant changes; the new show was much more focused on the crime rather than the officers, personal stories almost vanished completely, and incidental music was introduced for the first time in the series. The show moved post-watershed, after being pre-watershed for twenty-one years, in order to feature grittier, more action-packed scenes. The show began high definition broadcasts just prior to the revamp, the first on 1 July 2009 with episode number 682, titled "Conviction: Cover Up". Two episodes later, the episode numbers were reset to 001, on the third episode of a six-part story. Owing to episodes being aired out of production order, the episode numbers 684–689 and 691–693 went unused, even though episodes 690 and 694–697 had already been broadcast.

Prior to the revamp, a total of six characters were written out as the cast was trimmed, with Lisa Maxwell as DI Samantha Nixon the only one of the six who chose to exit rather than face the axe; Maxwell cited personal reasons including two miscarriages that saw her take time off-screen from September 2008 until January 2009. The harshest dismissal was that of Kaye Wragg (PC Diane Noble), who made just one appearance after returning from maternity leave in a plot that revealed she was joining neighbouring station Barton Street as a sergeant, wanting one night at Sun Hill to prepare for the transfer after spending her time off-screen working for a county force. Claire Goose (Insp Rachel Weston) also exited the series just prior to the revamp as she herself went on maternity leave, but owing to the series being axed while she was off-screen, whether or not she was due to return was never confirmed. Her exit saw her promise to join Superintendent John Heaton's new human trafficking division for one year, hinting that she may have returned to Sun Hill, despite Sergeant Dale Smith being promoted into her place.

In another controversial move just under two years after Jeff Stewart was axed, 22-year show veteran PC Tony Stamp was sacked by the show's producers soon after the revamp, stating they felt Stamp did not "fit in with the show's new dynamic"; actor Graham Cole said he was devastated to leave the show, having been a regular since 1988 and an extra from 1984. His last appearance came in the episode "Rescue Me" on 5 November 2009 as the character left to join Police Training school Hendon as an advanced driving instructor. Ali Bastian also resigned from her role as (PC Sally Armstrong) after joining the lineup of Strictly Come Dancing, while Claire Foster mysteriously left her role of PC Millie Brown around the same time; 2009 ended as the only year in the 27-year run of the series not to include a new character arrival.

=== 2010: Cancellation ===
With ratings in decline less than a year into the new format, ITV announced on 26 March 2010 that it would not be commissioning further episodes beyond the current series, citing the new format failing to arrest the ratings' decline. Fans appealed with online petitions, Facebook groups and media attention, in order to get ITV to reconsider, but attempts were unsuccessful. Filming ceased in June 2010, and the final episode of The Bill, "Respect: Part 2", aired on 31 August 2010, followed by a special tribute show named "Farewell The Bill".

== 2021: "Revival" plans ==
In April 2021, reports emerged that The Bill could make a comeback in the form of a spin-off. Although details were scarce, it was reported by various media sources that screen writer Simon Sansome was trying to revive the series. A pilot script had allegedly been written under the name Sun Hill (owing to a licence agreement that meant the series could not have the original name), and could feature three cast members from the original series: Trudie Goodwin (Sgt June Ackland), Graham Cole (PC Tony Stamp) and Mark Wingett (DC Jim Carver); an entry at the IMDb states the premise would be the trio advising the current Sun Hill Police Station team on how to resolve an influx of murder–suicides in Canley, the fictional district The Bill was set in. Wingett confirmed the news on his Twitter page but said the series had not been greenlit at the time As of November 2021, no further news has been announced, nor has a date been set for any potential premiere.
