= Natalie Roles =

English actress (born 1968)

- Born: 8 September 1968 (age 58); Hertfordshire, England
- Occupation: Actress

Natalie Joanne Roles (born 8 September 1968) is an English actress, known for playing DS Debbie McAllister in the British police drama The Bill.

== Early life ==
Roles was born in Hertfordshire to a Maltese mother and a British father. Along with her sister, Roles attended the Bush Davies School of Theatre Arts in Sussex.

== Career ==
Roles began her acting career when she 17 and she made several appearances in commercials. She started her TV career as a dancer in 1988 on the musical film It Couldn't Happen Here, starring Neil Tennant and Chris Lowe of Pet Shop Boys. In 1993, she made a guest appearance as school secretary Janet Clark in the Press Gang episode "Head and Heart". In 1995, she appeared in an episode of sitcom Men Behaving Badly as one of Tony's three girlfriends. She also appeared in the espionage thriller film Night Watch alongside Pierce Brosnan, and the 1996 British drama film Indian Summer (also known as Alive & Kicking).

In 2000, Roles had a lead role in the BBC series Take a Girl Like You, before she was cast as DS Debbie McAllister in the ITV drama The Bill. She had previously appeared in the serial in guest roles. Her character was introduced alongside several other cast changes in the aftermath of the DS Don Beech scandal storyline. In her four years on The Bill, Roles was involved in some of the biggest storylines, including a starring role in the plot that led to the eventual departure of Supt Tom Chandler.

She has also appeared in the Minder episode "Opportunity Knocks and Bruises" as Amanda, a nurse and Ray Daley's latest girlfriend. In 1999, she played a nurse in The New Professionals, and appeared in Highlander: The Raven. Roles guested in the ITV medical drama The Golden Hour in 2005.

In 2022, Roles was interviewed by former The Bill co-star Suzanne Maddock for a three-part edition of The Bill Podcast, discussing her time on the series and career as a whole. Roles has subsequently taken over from Oliver Crocker as the presenter of The Bill Podcast, interviewing her co-stars Beth Cordingly, Raji James, Jane Wall, Pal Aron and Brian Bovell, and former executive producer Paul Marquess.

In 2023, Roles was cast as Abigail Wesley in the fiction podcast Letter from Helvetica, written by and co-starring Andrew Mackintosh, the pair having first worked together on two episodes of The Bill. A second series followed in 2024.

== Filmography ==
Year	Title	Role	Notes
1987	It Couldn't Happen Here	Dancer	Musical film
1991	The Upper Hand	Model	TV series, 1 episode: "Older Than Springtime"
1991	Screen One	(uncredited)	TV series, 1 episode: "Alive and Kicking",
1993	Press Gang	Janet	TV series, 1 episode: "Head and Heart"
1993	Minder	Amanda	TV series, 1 episode: "Opportunity Knocks and Bruises"
1993	The Bill	Mandy Cartwright	TV series, 1 episode
1995	Woof!	Marion	TV series, 1 episode: "Birthday"
1995	Detonator II: Night Watch	Jennifer	American TV movie
1995	Men Behaving Badly	Imogen	TV series, 1 episode: "Three Girlfriends"
1995	Space Precinct	Officer Chloe Vincent	TV series, 1 episode: "Predator and Prey"
1996	Alive and Kicking	Catherine	Film
1997	The Bill	Sara Everitt	TV series, 1 episode
1999	CI5: The New Professionals	Nurse	TV series, 1 episode: "Miss Hit"
1999	Cold Feet	Callie	TV series, 1 episode: "Episode #2.3"
1999	Highlander: The Raven	Janet Ross	TV series, 1 episode: "Dead on Arrival"
2000	Take a Girl Like You	Joan	TV series, 2 episodes: "Part 2" and "Part 3"
2000–2004	The Bill	DS Debbie McAllister	TV series, 189 episodes
2005	The Golden Hour	Nikki	TV mini-series, 1 episode: "Episode #1.2"
2005	Doctors	Paula Westlake	TV series, 1 episode: "Under the Weather"
2005	Holby City	Suzanne Lake	TV series, 1 episode: "War and Peace"
2006	The Gil Mayo Mysteries	Sarah Ludlow	TV mini-series, 1 episode: "A Sunset Touch"
2023–2024	Letter from Helvetica	Abigail Wesley	Fictional podcast, 12 episodes
2024	Murder by Appointment	Joan Langford	Short film
2024	Jackson's Cat	Rosie	Short film
2024	Still Got It	Ash	Web series, pilot
2024	The Gerry Anderson Podcast	Self / Chloe Vincent	Web series, 2 episodes
2025	Letter from Helvetica: Christmas Specials	Abigail Wesley	Fictional podcast, 2 episodes
2025	Do Us Part	Lisa	Short film
2025	I Love This Job: The Making of Space Precinct	Self / Chloe Vincent	Documentary
