= Roberto Muñoz (producer) =

German-born American producer and director

Roberto Munoz
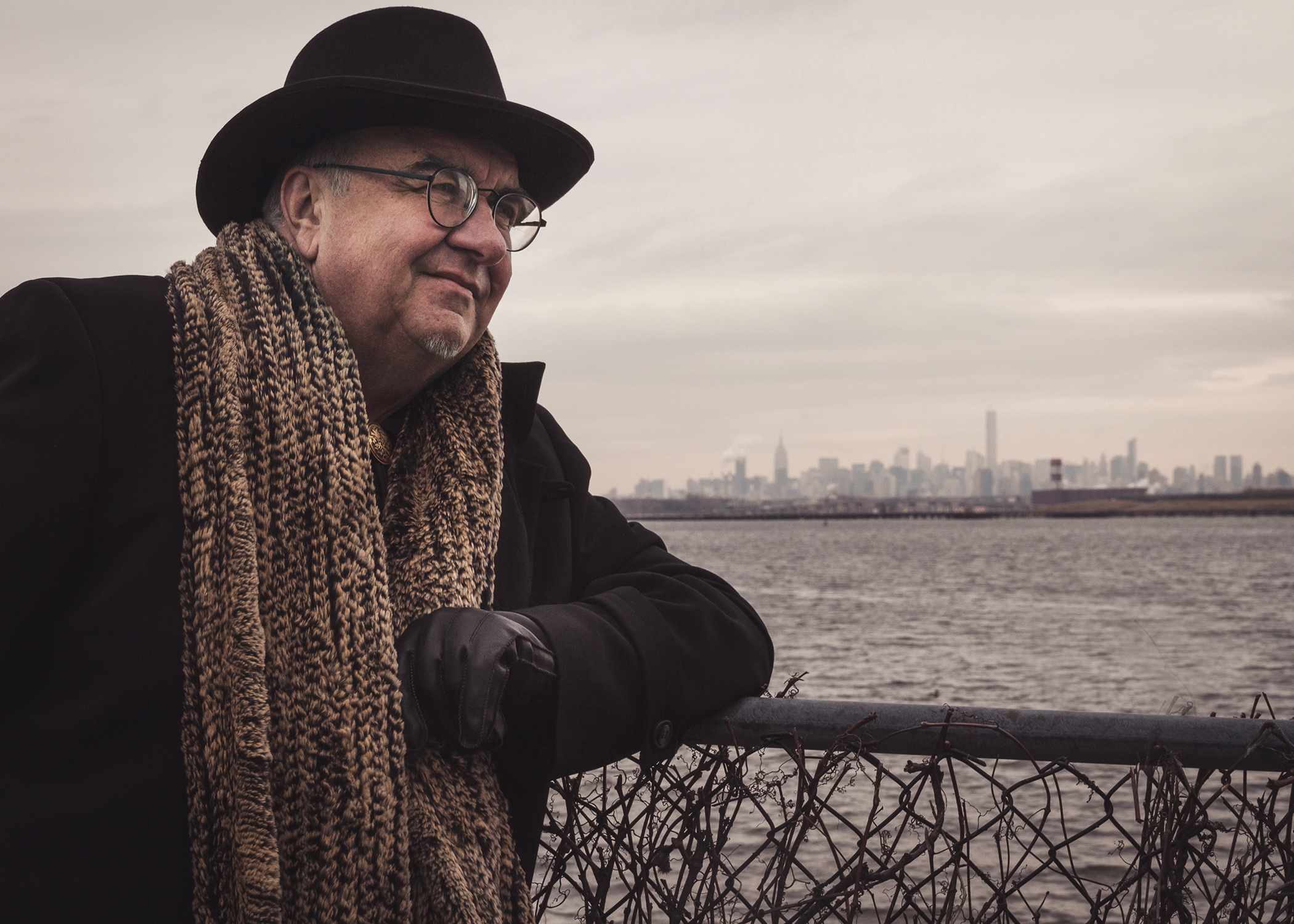
- Born: August 22, 1951; Unterensingen, Germany
- Died: April 2025 (aged 73)
- Occupations: Producer, Writer
- Website: cubecity.org

Roberto Munoz (August 22, 1951 – April 17, 2025) was a producer, director, and screenwriter. He founded and was president of the not-for-profit New York based CubeCity Entertainment, Inc. He was one of the writing team members that wrote under the name R.M.M. Munoz.

== Early life ==
Munoz was born in Unterensingen, Germany on August 22, 1951. His father was a member of the 1936 Spanish Olympic boxing team. His mother's family was of German-Russian origin. He immigrated with his parents to St. Catharines, Ontario, Canada when he was eight.

== Concert Promoter ==
Munoz began in the entertainment industry in the 1980s when he managed the alternative Gospel band, Level Heads, featuring Juno award-winning musician, Jim Chevalier. As a promoter, he staged Phil Keaggy and Second Chapter of Acts concerts. In 1988, Munoz went on to promote Freedom 88, a three-day alternative Gospel Music festival at Bingeman Park in Kitchener, Ontario with such notable names as Steve Taylor, Adam Again, and the Grammy-award-winning band The Choir. This work inspired his later feature film: Lazer Us: The Legend of Jimi Lazer.

== Work in Theatre ==
In the 1990s, he turned to musical theatre, collaborating with sons Miq and Mann Munoz on Job and the Snake, which premiered in the Niagara Peninsula in September 1994. The musical featured Lee Siegel in the role of Job, who has since gone on to perform in the Broadway revival of Jesus Christ Superstar.

Munoz went on to found Trinity Basement Theatre in Toronto, Ontario where he workshopped various musicals, including Job and the Snake starring Kevin Connelly, at the Betty Oliphant Theatre, home of the National Ballet School of Canada. An earlier 1996 showcase featured Melissa McIntyre, of Degrassi: The Next Generation, in the role of Elihu. In 2000, Job and the Snake had a three-week run at the Grove Theatre in the Los Angeles area. Walter Winston O'Neil played the role of Job, who has since gone on to perform on Broadway in the musical Wicked. Later, for the 10th anniversary in 2004, Job and the Snake was showcased Off-Broadway in New York City, starring Troy Curtis, of Menudo fame, in the role of Job (credited as Troy Kurtis).

While in New York City, Munoz showcased his off-Broadway musicals Purim Day and Epimenides at the Lamb's Theatre. Two of his other musicals, Come Away and Aesop, were performed at the Producers Club Theatre on 44th Street in Manhattan.

Munoz returned to theatre in 2016, with a reboot of his musical, Job and the Snake. He put out a casting call in the Detroit area in September and showcased the new production in November.

== Work in Film ==
In 2006, Munoz switched gears once again—this time to independent filmmaking—when he wrote, produced, and directed his first feature film, Dear J (originally entitled Liars and Lunatics). The film features Joseph Halsey, Allison Lane, Carson Grant, and Karen Lynn Gorney in the role of the Judge.

In 2009, Munoz wrote and produced his second feature film, Under Jakob's Ladder. Directed by Mann Munoz, it stars Jeff Stewart and Christopher Elliott, and also features Ken Jennings. This film is based on the experiences of his maternal great-grandfather, who was one of the Germans from Russia who survived the Holodomor and was arrested and thrown into prison during Stalin's Great Terror in the late 1930s. One of the chess endgames in the movie was created by grandmaster Susan Polgar.

On returning to the Niagara Region in 2010, Munoz started a film company called Curium Films. 2010 saw the DVD release of "Christianity and the Competition", an eight-part seminar by Dr. Paul L. Maier, which Munoz produced. In 2012, he began filming his third feature, Lazer Us which is based on his work as a band manager. Lazer Us went on to win Best Adventure Film at the Manhattan Film Festival in 2013 and was released on DVD in 2014.

In January 2013, Munoz traveled to Haiti where he shot a documentary for the Haiti Lutheran Mission Society, featuring Revenel Benoit and his work in the city of Gonaives, Haiti. His documentary, Haiti: A David and Goliath Story won two film festival awards for Best Documentary and Best Canadian Film (CLIFF Film Festival).

Munoz filmed his fourth feature film, Lost Penny, in August 2014 in St. Catharines, Ontario working with Broadway Lights Dance Studio. He reconnected with the studio after having worked with them in his theatre days with his musical Job and the Snake. The DVD was released in 2016.

=== Filmography ===
Year	Title	Position
2014	Lost Penny	Writer, producer
2013	Lazer Us: The Legend of Jimi Lazer	Writer, producer
2013	Haiti: a David and Goliath Story	Director
2011	Under Jakob's Ladder	Writer, producer
2010	Christianity and the Competition	Producer
2008	FINALe: Larry Norman Live in NYC	Producer
2008	Grandmother Granddaughter	Producer
2008	Dear J	Director, writer, producer

=== Awards ===
- 2015 Manhattan Film Festival. Winner Lost Penny.
- 2013 CLIFF Film Festival. Won Best Canadian Film + Best Documentary for Haiti: A David and Goliath Story.
- 2013 Manhattan Film Festival. Won Best Film – Adventure Category The Legend of Jimi Lazer.
- 2011 Manhattan Film Festival. Won Best Period Piece Under Jakob's Ladder.
- 2010 Redemptive Film Festival. Won the Redemptive Storyteller Award for Under Jakob's Ladder.
- 2008 Awarded four doves by the Dove Foundation for Dear J.
- 2000 Finalist Award at the WorldFest Houston International Film Festival for A Christmas Card. Co-produced television Christmas Special for Spirit Connection, aired on VisionTV.

== Interest in Education ==
In the late 1980s, Munoz developed an educational tool, called Y7K. It's a series of flash cards that are based on historical figures and can be used as a game. As of 2013, he was working on a series of videos based on the game; developing it for Haiti TV.

In 2004, he began teaching a theatre/film course at the New York School of the Bible in Manhattan.

== Illness and death ==
In 2023, Munoz was diagnosed with colon cancer. On April 17, 2025, he died in the hospital at the age of 73.
