= CubeCity Entertainment =

American film and theatre production company

CubeCity Entertainment, Inc.
- Company type: Not-for-Profit
- Industry: Film and Theatre production
- Headquarters: New York, United States
- Key people: Roberto Munoz, Founder
- Website: cubecity.org

CubeCity Entertainment, Inc. is an independent film and theatre production company, based in New York City.

== History of CubeCity ==
CubeCity Entertainment was founded by Roberto Muñoz. Originally located in the Niagara Peninsula in Ontario, Canada, it was called P.M. Productions at the time. It officially made a name change when the company moved to the New York City area in 2000.

=== Musical theatre ===
In 1994, Muñoz and his team assembled a troupe of local actors in the Niagara Peninsula to stage the rock musical Job and the Snake. In 1995, they moved up to Toronto, Ontario where they showcased Job in several larger venues. The company then produced various musicals and plays in their workshop theatre space, Trinity Basement Theatre.

In the spring of 2000, they produced a run of Job and the Snake at the Grove Theatre in Los Angeles, California before moving to New York City that fall. In 2001, CubeCity Entertainment was officially incorporated in the State of New York. CubeCity showcased several productions in Off-Broadway venues—beginning with the musical Purim Day. In October 2004, they showcased Job and the Snake, starring Troy Curtis and Dale Church.

==== Musicals and plays ====
The company's theatre projects include:

- Job and the Snake
- Come Away
- Purim Day
- Epimenides
- The Trial

=== Filmmaking ===
In 2006, CubeCity turned its focus on independent filmmaking with their first feature film Liars and Lunatics, later renamed Dear J. The movie was filmed in Whitestone, Queens, New York. Directed by Roberto Munoz and Mann Munoz, Dear J features Joseph Halsey, Allison Lane, Carson Grant, Maya Serhan, Patrick Mitchell, and Karen Lynn Gorney in the role of the Judge. The DVD was released in 2008.

CubeCity also produced FINALe, a DVD featuring the final solo performance concert of Larry Norman before he died in 2008. The concert took place in New York City in August 2007. The DVD was released in 2008.

Under Jakob's Ladder is CubeCity's second feature film. It stars actors Jeff Stewart, Christopher Elliott, and Sal Rendino. The film was shot in the spring of 2009 and released on DVD in 2012. The movie won the 2010 "Redemptive Storyteller Award" at the Redemptive Film Festival; and two awards at the 2011 Manhattan Film Festival for "Best Film - Period Piece" and "Best Actor" (Jeff Stewart).

In 2012, CubeCity collaborated with Curium Films to produce Lazer Us in Niagara Falls, Canada. This movie won "Best Film - Adventure Category" at the 2013 Manhattan Film Festival. Directed by Mann Munoz, the movie features Robbie Beniuk, Patrick J. Mitchell, Elijah Black, Robert Tanos, Tanya Lynne, Christopher Elliott, and Jim Yorfido.

CubeCity Entertainment also collaborated with Curium Films when they traveled to Haiti to film a documentary called Haiti: a David and Goliath Story in January 2013.

CubeCity's fourth feature, Lost Penny, was filmed in August 2014 in St. Catharines, Ontario. Producer Roberto Munoz reconnected with Broadway Lights Dance Studio, having worked with them in his theatre days with his musical Job and the Snake. Directed by Mann Munoz, the movie features Rachael McOwen, Victoria Guthrie, Andrew Roth, Christopher Elliott, Stephen Velichko, and Victoria Murdoch. The film was screened at the Manhattan Film Festival (as a festival award winner) and the Niagara Integrated Film Festival where it sold out its screening.

==== Selected filmography ====
Year	Title	Type
2016	Lost Penny	Feature
2015	Home at Last	Documentary
2015	Quiet Tears	Music Video
2014	Lazer Us: The Legend of Jimi Lazer	Feature
2013	Haiti: a David and Goliath Story	Documentary
2010	Under Jakob's Ladder	Feature
2008	Grandmother Granddaughter	Short
2008	FINALe: Larry Norman Live in NYC	Concert
2008	Dear J	Feature

==== Awards ====
- 2015 Manhattan Film Festival. Winner Lost Penny.
- 2013 CLIFF Film Festival. Won Best Canadian Film + Best Documentary for Haiti: A David and Goliath Story.
- 2013 Manhattan Film Festival. Won Best Film – Adventure Category Lazer Us.
- 2011 Manhattan Film Festival. Won Best Period Piece Under Jakob's Ladder.
- 2010 Redemptive Film Festival. Won the Redemptive Storyteller Award for Under Jakob's Ladder.
