= Lazer Us =

- Film poster
- Directed by: Mann Munoz
- Written by: R.M.M. Munoz
- Produced by: Roberto Muñoz
- Starring: Robbie Beniuk; Patrick J. Mitchell; Amy Landon; Christopher Elliott
- Cinematography: Martin Munoz
- Edited by: Mann Munoz
- Music by: Miq Munoz
- Release date: June 27, 2013 (Manhattan Film Festival)
- Running time: 92 minutes
- Countries: United States; Canada
- Language: English

Lazer Us: The Legend of Jimi Lazer is an independent film by CubeCity Entertainment and Curium Films. Originally titled The Legend of Jimi Lazer, it won "Best Film - Adventure Category" at the Manhattan Film Festival and screened at Toronto's Reel Indie Film Festival. Its new name was unveiled for the DVD release in 2014. The film stars Robbie Beniuk, Patrick J. Mitchell, Amy Landon, Elijah Black, Robert Tanos, Tanya Lynne, Christopher Elliott, and Jim Yorfido.

Written and produced by Roberto Munoz, the story is inspired by his days in the music industry. In the 1980s, Munoz managed the alternative Gospel band, Level Heads, featuring Juno award-winning musician, Jim Chevalier. He promoted such acts as Phil Keaggy and Second Chapter of Acts, and Freedom 88, a three-day alternative Gospel Music festival at Bingeman Park in Kitchener, Ontario with Steve Taylor, Adam Again, and The Choir.

== Plot ==
Jimi Lazer, front-man guitarist of the up-and-coming rock band LAZER US, gets wind of a magical guitar. He pays a visit to the Hex who reveals the steep price of such a deal. Realizing she won’t let him back out, he now lives under a curse. Jimi takes the guitar and disappears. No one hears from him again. Twenty-seven long years pass. Jimi's old band manager, Freedom, arrives in a beat-up old van. He tells Jimi that he has had a dream where Jimi was playing music with the Man in Black. He and Jimi set out on a mad-cap chase to re-assemble the magical guitar before the Guitar Hunter does. With the help of his former bandmates, Righty and Red, and a new face, Zmoothie, they set out to break the curse once and for all.

== Cast ==
- Robbie Beniuk as Jimi Lazer
- Patrick J. Mitchell as Freedom
- Amy Landon as Zmoothie
- Elijah Black as Righty
- Robert Tanos as Red
- Tanya Lynne as the Hex
- Christopher Elliott as the Guitar Hunter
- Jim Yorfido as the Man in Black

== Awards ==
2013 Manhattan Film Festival

- Best Film - Adventure Category
