= Colors: Bangin' in South Carolina =

- Film poster
- Directed by: Terry Davis
- Release date: July 1, 2014
- Country: United States
- Language: English

Colors: Bangin' in South Carolina is a 2014 documentary film directed by Terry Davis. The documentary explores the gang epidemic that plagued the state's capital city, Columbia for years. The film details the 15-year gang feud between the Crips, Bloods, and Gangster Disciples. In 2014, the documentary was presented with the Film Heals award at the Manhattan Film Festival at the Quad City Cinema in New York City.
