= Sun Hill Serial Killer =

Storyline in the television series The Bill

The Sun Hill Serial Killer was a major storyline from the ITV police procedural drama The Bill. They were known on screen as the "River Murders", due to the bodies being left on the banks of the River Thames. The storyline spanned several months, from July 2002 to January 2003, with cast regular Cass Rickman (played by Suzanne Maddock), killed off at the denouement in December 2002. It also served as the exit storyline for DC Duncan Lennox, who transferred from Sun Hill Police Station to the Murder Investigation Team during the plot. The storyline concluded with the killer's capture in 2003 after they kidnapped Acting DI Samantha Nixon. It was the first of several serial killer storylines in the show.

== The victims ==
All the victims of the killer featured prominently in various episodes.

- Liz Chambers (Brooke Kinsella) – A teenage goth who testified against her father in court for assaulting her boyfriend.
- Tina Pope (Nicola Stapleton) – A young mother being pressured to testify against her violent husband, who savagely slashed her lover's face with a knife. The police begin the hunt for a serial killer when her body is discovered, bearing the same hallmarks as the body of Liz Chambers.
- Miriam Ray (Julie Maisey) – The victim of a flasher; she helps the police identify the man who exposes himself in a park.
- Lucy Corrigan (Fiona Glascott) – Desperate to drive a wedge in her ex-boyfriend's marriage, she sends hate mail to herself claiming him as the sender. Her tearful and frightened act vanishes into a cool and ruthless one once her lies are exposed.
- Vicki Casson (Jade Williams) – A middle-class teenage runaway determined to make her stepmother's life hell, including putting her in hospital.
- PC Cass Rickman (Suzanne Maddock) – The final victim of the serial killer, the only cast regular killed off as part of the storyline.

== The suspects ==
- Martin Porter (Simon Chadwick) – The ex-fiancée of PC Kerry Young, a duty solicitor with access to the courts. Arrested whilst attempting to abduct a drunk girl, Porter was solicitor for Lucy Corrigan's ex-boyfriend and frequently clashed with PC Cass Rickman. Acting DI Samantha Nixon suspected his failed relationships with women could lead him to targeting them, while he lived near the river at the time of the first two murders. He was cleared when he had an alibi for the murder of Rickman.
- Peter Baxter (Hywel Bennett) – A convicted sex offender who had been released in mid-2002 after serving 27 years in prison for murder and rape. He lured Acting DI Samantha Nixon to talk to her about his crimes, Nixon having trained as a criminal profiler, was keen to get inside his head. He was arrested and confessed to the murders, but only gave details on Liz Chambers. Baxter lived near the river as a child and frequently visited the area, but Nixon discovered he had found the body of Chambers on the banks before the police did and was just desperate to go back to prison. Baxter would go on to make further appearances in 2004 and 2005.
- Shane Pellow (Phil Cornwell) – Ex-boyfriend of Liz Chambers, Pellow was a former undertaker and took photos of Tina Pope's body at work, posting them on a sordid S&M website. Cass Rickman unsuccessfully tried to get Liz Chambers to leave him, and then when she discovered he had another young girlfriend, Rickman persuaded the girl to leave him. Pellow had also gotten close to Vicki Casson before her death, having had drinks with her in a pub before she went missing. Due to his connection with the three of the victims and his grudge against Rickman, he was a strong contender. He was cleared due to a lack of connection to the other victims.
- Simon Kitson (Mark Letheren) – The boyfriend of Cass Rickman, Kitson was a journalist who had a major interest in the case. His wife had also gone missing several years earlier, suggesting she could've been the first victim. When Rickman was killed, Kitson was arrested after a report of his car being seen near where Rickman was abducted. When her DNA was found in the boot of his car, Rickman's grieving best friend PC Nick Klein pressured an unstable Kitson to kill himself, convinced he was the killer. As MIT went to question him, he was found in his cell having slit his wrists, and efforts to revive him were not successful.
- Pat Kitson (Alexandra Gilbreath) – The sister of Simon Kitson, who is eventually unmasked as the killer. Pat emerged as a suspect after the suicide of her brother. Acting DI Samantha Nixon suspected she killed Simon's wife and then girlfriend Cass Rickman, after discovering Simon bought an engagement ring for her. She was further intrigued to discover Pat attended Rickman's funeral. Nixon's theory was that Pat wanted to get rid of women she felt "weren't good enough" for him. Pat lured Nixon to the warehouse where Cass Rickman was murdered, abducting her to get justice for Simon's death in custody. Pat and Nixon shared stories whilst Pat held her hostage, Pat confiding that she was in love with her brother after they ended up in bed together as teenagers. Before Pat could kill Nixon, DC Duncan Lennox found them and arrested Pat for murder. Pat made one more appearance in the show after her arrest, when she was confronted by Nick Klein at her brother's funeral.

== The killer's methods ==
Pat Kitson targeted people who were both known to Sun Hill station through the courts, and people her brother interacted or bonded with. Once tracked down, Kitson strangled her victims, hacked off their hair and dumped the bodies on the banks of the River Thames.

== Legacy ==
The high ratings of the Serial Killer storyline led to two similar storylines in which other members of the cast were written out. The Sun Hill Gay Serial Killer storyline in 2005 saw the exit of PC Lance Powell and the Sun Hill Sniper storyline saw out long-time favourite PC Kerry Young. The storyline was also referenced when Nixon's daughter went missing in season 20. She stated it was the most famous case she investigated during her career as a police officer to that point.
