= Curium Films =

Canadian film production company

- Industry: Film
- Headquarters: St. Catharines, Ontario
- Key people: Roberto Munoz, Founder
- Website: curiumfilms.com

Curium Films is a Canadian independent film production company, based in St. Catharines, Ontario. The company was founded by Roberto Munoz when he returned to Canada in 2010 after being in New York City.

== History of Curium ==
In 2010, filmmaker Roberto Munoz returned to Canada to help care for his ailing mother. He was asked to film a Dr. Paul L. Maier lecture series entitled "Christianity and the Competition". This DVD led to the birth of Curium Films.

In 2012, Curium collaborated with CubeCity Entertainment to film Lazer Us in Niagara Falls, Ontario. This movie won "Best Film - Adventure Category" at the 2013 Manhattan Film Festival. Directed by Mann Munoz, the movie features Robbie Beniuk, Patrick J. Mitchell, Elijah Black, Robert Tanos, Tanya Lynne, Christopher Elliott, and Jim Yorfido.

For another CubeCity collaboration, Roberto Munoz and his team traveled to Haiti to film a documentary called Haiti: a David and Goliath Story in January 2013. The documentary won two awards: Best Documentary and Best Canadian Film at CLIFF Film Festival.

Lost Penny, a feature film was filmed in August 2014 in St. Catharines, Ontario. Producer Roberto Munoz reconnected with Broadway Lights Dance Studio, having worked with them in his theatre days with his musical Job and the Snake. Directed by Mann Munoz, the movie features Rachael McOwen, Victoria Guthrie, Andrew Roth, Christopher Elliott, Stephen Velichko, and Victoria Murdoch. The film was screened at the Manhattan Film Festival (as a festival award winner) and the Niagara Integrated Film Festival where it sold out its screening.

In 2015, Curium did a short documentary called Home at Last, Home to Stay for Start Me Up Niagara. The documentary followed five individuals who were helped as part of the Housing First Initiative in Niagara.

== Selected filmography ==
| Year | Title | Type |
|---|---|---|
| 2016 | Lost Penny | Feature |
| 2015 | Home at Last | Documentary |
| 2015 | Quiet Tears | Music Video |
| 2014 | Lazer Us | Feature |
| 2013 | Haiti: a David and Goliath Story | Documentary |

=== Awards ===
- 2015 Manhattan Film Festival. Winner Lost Penny.
- 2013 CLIFF Film Festival. Won Best Canadian Film + Best Documentary for Haiti: A David and Goliath Story.
- 2013 Manhattan Film Festival. Won Best Film – Adventure Category Lazer Us.
