= Lost Penny =

- Directed by: Mann Munoz
- Written by: R.M.M. Munoz
- Produced by: Roberto Munoz
- Starring: Rachael McOwen; Victoria Guthrie; Andrew Roth; Christopher Elliott
- Cinematography: Martin Munoz
- Edited by: Mann Munoz
- Music by: Miq Munoz
- Release date: 2015
- Running time: 92 minutes
- Country: United States
- Language: English

Lost Penny is an independent film drama, produced by CubeCity Entertainment, in association with Curium Films. Mann Munoz directed the film, and Roberto Munoz produced. The movie stars Rachael McOwen, Victoria Guthrie, Andrew Roth, Christopher Elliott, Stephen Velichko and Victoria Murdoch. It was partly inspired by Alice in Wonderland, with Penny traveling to a mysterious underworld club, where she meets an assortment of quirky characters.

Filming took place in the Niagara region in August 2014. The filmmakers worked with Broadway Lights Dance Studio of St. Catharines, Ontario, after having worked with the studio on the musical Job and the Snake. The film was screened at the Manhattan Film Festival (where it became a festival award winner) and at the Niagara Integrated Film Festival, where its screening sold out.

== Plot ==
The film tells the story of a young woman's search for the father she has never met. When Penny (McOwen, of The Amazing Spider-Man 2) finds a mysterious box that promises to grant her greatest wish, she is transported to an Underworld Club. There she meets Lucien (Elliott). He tells her that to have her wish, she must play the Game and reach "Number One". She encounters a series of quirky characters before coming across a solitary Barefoot Man (Thomas Nelson). He warns her about Lucien. Penny does not know what to believe when Tenshi (Roth) turns up and reveals the sinister secret of the Club. Before Tenshi can help her, Lucien steps in and shows his true self.

== Cast ==
- Rachael McOwen as Penny
- Victoria Guthrie as Penny's mother
- Andrew Roth as Tenshi
- Christopher Elliott as Lucien
- Stephen Velichko as Gadget
- Victoria Murdoch as Fudge
- Melanie Gaydos as Hostess
- William J Bruce III as Mario "Kingpin" Harris

== Film festivals ==
- Manhattan Film Festival (winner)
- Niagara Integrated Film Festival
