= Indian Summer (1996 film) =

British drama film

- Theatrical release poster
- Directed by: Nancy Meckler
- Screenplay by: Martin Sherman
- Produced by: Martin Pope
- Starring: Jason Flemyng; Antony Sher; Diane Parish; Dorothy Tutin
- Cinematography: Chris Seager
- Edited by: Rodney Holland
- Music by: Peter Salem
- Production companies: Channel Four Films; Martin Pope Productions; Greentrees Films
- Release date: 17 November 1996 (London Film Festival)
- Running time: 98 minutes
- Country: United Kingdom
- Language: English

Indian Summer, also known as Alive & Kicking, is a 1996 British drama film directed by Nancy Meckler and starring Jason Flemyng, Antony Sher and Bill Nighy. The script was written by Martin Sherman.

The film was released in the UK as Indian Summer and in the United States as Alive & Kicking due to the recently released Indian Summer by Mike Binder in 1993. The film had its premiere at the 40th London Film Festival on 17 November 1996.

== Plot ==
The story follows a self-involved and very focused ballet dancer, Tonio, who has just lost his lover to AIDS, and his best friend Ramon is in the hospital being treated for AIDS. After Ramon dies, Tonio and the other company members decide to revive a dance originally performed by Ramon, called Indian Summer, with Tonio taking on the lead role.

After a rehearsal one night, Tonio encounters Jack at a club, a former therapist of Ramon. When Jack comes on to Tonio, he discloses his HIV status. Despite this, Jack continues to pursue Tonio, leading to a dinner date, a shared night, and the beginning of a steady relationship.

Jack convinces Tonio to join him on a holiday to Greece, where they have a good time, but when they return to London, Tonio starts to focus on dance rehearsals, which leads to a strain in their relationship. Tragedy strikes when Tonio wakes up to find himself paralysed the day of the performance. The dance troupe comes up with the idea that the ballet will go on, with Tonio still performing, with support from the other dancers. It turns out to be a brilliant performance, after which Tonio regains his ability to walk. The rift between Jack and Tonio finally begins to improve at last.

== Cast ==
- Jason Flemyng as Tonio
- Antony Sher as Jack
- Bill Nighy as Tristan
- Diane Parish as Millie
- Dorothy Tutin as Luna
- Anthony Higgins as Ramon
- Philip Voss as Duncan
- Aiden Waters as Vincent
- Natalie Roles as Catherine
- Freddy Douglas as Luke
- Kenneth Tharp as Howard
- Michael Keegan-Dolan as Alan
- Ruth Lass as Night Nurse
- Linda Bassett as Doctor
- Hilary Reynolds as Nurse

== Reception ==
The film's reviews were mixed. It holds a 86% "fresh" rating on Rotten Tomatoes based on 7 reviews.

Timeout wrote in their review that the story "remains solidly in the tradition of gritty British realism, resolutely unglamorous and looking always rather TV-bound; Martin Sherman's script is cogent and witty, and steers clear of the downbeat worthiness of the AIDS drama ghetto towards the more invigorating realms of contemporary gay courtship." Variety Magazine said the film is "often likable, sometimes involving but ultimately uneven; it is just about held together by a strong performance from Antony Sher amid variable playing from the rest of the cast and a bumpy script by Sherman."

In his review for the Library Journal, James Van Buskirk said "the physical and emotional dance between Jack and Tonio, two seemingly mismatched men, propels the predictable plot; some strong performances fail to overcome the cliches of Sherman's often melodramatic script." Vicky Allan from Sight and Sound observed that "too much of British filmmaking cleaves to theatrical concerns; this film has all the marks of a director in thrall to a strong theatrical tradition." She goes on to say that "Sherman has to be admired for producing an admirably unsentimental script about dealing with being HIV positive; it's a pity it is so bound up in theatrical presentation."

Michael Dwyer of the Irish Times wrote it is "an earnest and well-intentioned, if heavy-handed, drama, redeemed by a good cast, led by Jason Flemyng and Antony Sher." Film critic Howard Feinstein wrote that "the film is the latest in a long line of movies to have AIDS as its central theme, and once again, the film-makers have got it all wrong." In his view, "London's gay milieu is presented falsely, and it is a rather uncinematic movie; the gay references are appallingly cliched, and the HIV status becomes a plot device to move a dated story idea along." Christopher Bowen wrote in The Times that "while the often turbulent relationship between the two men and the film's very positive approach to living with AIDS lie at the heart of the movie, the largely convincing portrayal of life in a dance company also comes as a small revelation; after all, the world's film archives are not overburdened with telling backstage ballet biopics."

== See also ==
- List of LGBTQ-related films
- List of LGBTQ-related films directed by women
