= Screaming (TV series) =

- Genre: Sitcom
- Written by: Carla Lane
- Directed by: Mike Stephens
- Starring: Gwen Taylor; Penelope Wilton; Jill Baker
- Country of origin: United Kingdom
- Original language: English
- No. of series: 1
- No. of episodes: 8

Production
- Producer: Mike Stephens
- Running time: 30 minutes
- Production company: BBC

Original release
- Network: BBC 1
- Release: 15 March – 3 May 1992

Screaming is a British television sitcom which originally aired on BBC 1 in 1992. Three women, former school friends, sharing a home have all unwittingly had a relationship with the same man.

== Main cast ==
- Gwen Taylor as Annie
- Penelope Wilton as Beatrice
- Jill Baker as Rachael
- Anthony Barclay as Florian

== Bibliography ==
- Horace Newcomb. Encyclopedia of Television. Routledge, 2014.
