= The Vanishing Man =

1997-98 British TV movie and series

- Genre: Comedy drama Mystery
- Created by: Anthony Horowitz
- Written by: John Sullivan
- Directed by: Roger Bamford
- Starring: Jill Baker; Helen Grace; Neil Morrissey
- Composers: Alexandre de Faria (pilot); Hal Lindes (series)
- Country of origin: United Kingdom
- Original language: English
- No. of series: 1
- No. of episodes: 7

Production
- Cinematography: Paul Bond
- Running time: 100 mins (1997); 50 mins (1998)
- Production companies: ABTV; Harbour Pictures; Meridian Television

Original release
- Network: ITV
- Release: 2 April 1997 – 22 August 1998

The Vanishing Man is a 1997 TV movie and subsequent 1998 series, starring Neil Morrissey as Nick Cameron, a man wrongly imprisoned for smuggling plutonium, who is then used for medical research which turns him invisible when in contact with water. Having escaped from prison, his powers are then utilised by a government agency.

It was produced by ABTV and Harbour Pictures in association with Meridian Television for ITV.

== Plot summary ==
In the TV movie, Nick Cameron (Neil Morrissey) is a pilot running an air courier service with his brother Joe (Mark Womack). He is sent to Schiphol to collect a package, which unbeknown to him contains plutonium. When he returns, he is surrounded by armed police and arrested. Despite pleading his innocence, Nick is sentenced to 25 years in prison.

Solicitor Alice Grant (Lucy Akhurst) helps Nick with an appeal. She eventually starts to believe his innocence, when she researches his alibi and finds evidence of genuine mistakes. Alice's boss Gordon asks her to prioritise the Lawrence situation, a high-profile case involving a chemical company and a pollutant chemical called "harnium".

Meanwhile, Nick's prison governor is selecting volunteers for medical research. Nick agrees and is taken to a remote country manor, where a company called Gyges is researching a new technique that protects skin against UV radiation. Ms Jeffries (Barbara Flynn) takes him to a lab. Nick starts to have doubts, but despite his protests he is strapped to a machine that scans laser beams up and down his body. He returns to prison weak and in agony.

News of Nick's appeal worries the Gyges organisation, headed by a mysterious man in a mask and gloves. They decide to kill Nick before he can talk to Alice. Prisons guards are sent to Nick as he showers. As they approach, Nick sees his body disappearing from the feet up. The guards find the shower empty and raise the alarm. An invisible Nick steps out and looks at his empty reflection.

Nick escapes from prison by following Alice out and into her car. As she drives, Nick reappears naked on the back seat, causing Alice to crash into a tree. Nick tries to explain himself and Alice reluctantly agrees to take him back to her flat.

Gyges work out that Nick has become invisible and escaped. They reason he must be with Alice after finding her crashed car. Nick gets frustrated trying to convince Alice and leaves to go back to his own flat. On the way, he gets splashed by a car outside a pub and goes inside. There he meets his old friends and asks for help, but runs away when he sees his hand turning invisible.

Alice's boss turns up at her flat and after being rude about Nick and Alice, he spills his tea onto his lap and his chair moves away. Embarrassed, he leaves, taking her off the Lawrence case. Alice realises she is not alone and is swept off her feet by an invisible Nick.

Alice works out that a gas canister used by Gyges doesn't read "Hanoi", as Nick thought, but "Ha No.1", also known as harnium nitrate, the chemical manufactured by Lawrence's company Solex.

Alice speaks to Joe, who agrees to help them break into Lawrence's office. Waiting in the rain, Nick turns invisible and follows Lawrence into the building, spying on him while he accesses his computer. Nick emails all his files to Alice. With proof of a link, Alice visits Lawrence, who knows about Nick. Ms Jeffries enters and shoots Lawrence with an invisible gun. She then kidnaps Alice.

Nick works out that water turns him invisible. He agrees to meet with Ms Jeffries, dressed in gloves and balaclava, and offers himself in exchange for Alice. He goes back to the manor, holding a grenade as protection. Realising the grenade is fake, Gyges keep Alice and send Nick for testing. In reality, it is Joe underneath the clothes, and an invisible Nick goes to find Alice. After knocking out both of her guards, they make an escape, only to find Nick has reappeared. Down in a storage unit, Nick finds the suit he wore during the experiments, as well as a motorbike. They ride away from the mansion, but as it rains Nick, the suit and the bike vanish, leaving Alice speeding down a country lane in mid air. The Head tells Ms Jeffries that the Gyges facility will have to close, but the work will continue. He takes off his glove to reveal a semi transparent skeletal hand.

Alice returns to work to and meets DCI Moreau, who has been investigating Gyges and has made arrests. He agrees to close Nick's file in exchange for his help.

The subsequent 1998 series follows these assignments.

== Episodes ==
=== Pilot (1997) ===
Title	Original release date
"The Vanishing Man: Pilot"	2 April 1997

=== Season 1 (1998) ===
No.	Title	Original release date
1	"Nobody Does It Better"	18 July 1998
2	"Not Fade Away"	25 July 1998
3	"Nothing Up My Sleeve"	1 August 1998
4	"Out on a Limb"	8 August 1998
5	"Spooks"	15 August 1998
6	"Retribution"	22 August 1998

== Critical reception ==
In UK daily newspaper The Independent, Thomas Sutcliffe wrote, "The somewhat open ending of The Vanishing Man (ITV) suggests that last night's comedy thriller was intended as a pilot". Noting "an armful of improbabilities", he suggested, "you will either have switched off or settled back to enjoy the special effects". Sutcliffe found the programme eschewed a sophisticated treatment of the main character's invisibility, "settling instead for the charm of a protagonist who can knock baddies on the head just when they think they have things under control, and then unpredictably reappear in the nude for a bit of comic relief". He concluded, "If they do make the series, they should schedule it for Saturday tea-time, when its natural audience will be able to enjoy it".
