= Seema Bowri =

British actor (born 1976)

Seema Bowri (born 25 March 1976) is a British-based actress most noted for the role of PC Leela Kapoor in the ITV police drama The Bill from 2004 - 2007.

Seema studied Drama and Dance at the University of Birmingham before going on to feature on UK TV in Doctors, Casualty and Coupling and on stage at the Theatre Royal in Calcutta Kosher.
