= Kate Buffery =

British actress

- Occupation: Actress
- Years active: 1977–present
- Spouse(s): Roger Michell (div.)
- Children: 2

Kate Buffery is an English actress. She is known for her numerous roles on British television, including the ITV drama series Wish Me Luck (1988–1990), BBC miniseries Close Relations (1998), Channel 5 legal drama Wing and a Prayer (1997–1999), and the ITV police drama Trial & Retribution (1997–2002). Her stage work includes the 1983 original West End production of Daisy Pulls it Off, which earned her an Olivier Award nomination.

== Career ==
Buffery may be best known for her roles in the British television drama Wish Me Luck as Liz Grainger and as DI North in Trial and Retribution. She co-wrote an episode of the third series of Wish Me Luck. Her other work for television includes The Rainbow, Catherine Cookson's The Man Who Cried, Close Relations, Poirot, Frankenstein's Baby, Circles of Deceit, The Orchid House, Wing and a Prayer, The Ruth Rendell Mysteries, A Taste for Death (from the P.D. James novel), Midsomer Murders, Boon, and Heartbeat.

She has been a member of the Royal Shakespeare Company where Buffery's roles included Rosalind in As You Like It, Hermione in The Winter's Tale and Sue in Golden Girls. At the National Theatre, she was cast in roles for the premiere productions of two plays by David Hare. She also performed in Cicely Berry's production of Hamlet for the NT's Education Unit. Her film appearances include A Long Way Home (1989 TV film), Dark River (1990 TV film), Swing Kids (1993), Goodbye Charlie Bright, (2001) and EMR (2004). She performs extensively on the radio and as a voice-over artist. She was nominated for a 1983 Olivier Award as Best Supporting Actress for her role in Daisy Pulls It Off, losing out to Abigail McKern.

She has spoken on inequality for women in the Arts and Media at several conferences including for the Federation of International Artists, for the Sphinx and for Equity. She has worked as a teacher for the National Youth Theatre where she has run Shakespeare Masterclasses. Buffery now works as an advocate.

== Personal life ==
Buffery was formerly married to the film and theatre director Roger Michell; the couple had two children.

== Film and television roles ==
- Heartbeat – Shirley Barlow/Amanda Buxton – "Burying the Past" (2007), "Dog Days" (2003)
- Casualty – Fiona Atwell – "Inheritance" (2007)
- The Brief – Sara Cheeseman – "A Sort of Love" (2004)
- Midsomer Murders – Mallory Edmonton – "Birds of Prey" (2003)
- Trial & Retribution – DI Pat North – 12 episodes
- Wing and a Prayer – Amanda Dankwith – 8 episodes (1997–1999)
- The Ruth Rendell Mysteries – Dr. Lucas – "A Case of Coincidence: Parts 1 & 2" (1996)
- Agatha Christie's Poirot – Theresa Arundell – "Dumb Witness" (1996)
- Circles of Deceit: Dark Secret – Kate Moore – TV movie (1995)
- The Man Who Cried – Florrie Donnelly – TV movie (1993)
- Wish Me Luck – Liz Grainger/Celeste (1988–1990)
- The Rainbow – Winifred Inger – TV miniseries (1988)
