= Tales of Sherwood Forest =

British television mini-series

- Genre: Comedy drama
- Created by: Alan Plater
- Written by: Various
- Directed by: Various
- Starring: Pete Postlethwaite; Jill Baker; David Troughton; Robin Soans; Bee Jaye; Jack Carr; Ben Roberts; Terry Molloy; Wayne Foskett; Stephen Tompkinson; Anne Dyson; Penelope Lee; Lorraine Peters
- Composer: Frank Ricotti
- Country of origin: United Kingdom
- Original language: English
- No. of series: 1
- No. of episodes: 7

Production
- Executive producers: Ted Childs; Richard Argent
- Producer: Sarah Wilson
- Production locations: Nottingham, Nottinghamshire, England, UK
- Running time: 50 minutes
- Production company: Central Independent Television

Original release
- Network: ITV
- Release: 11 June – 23 July 1989

Tales of Sherwood Forest is a British comedy-drama series created by Alan Plater. The show starred Pete Postlethwaite and Jill Baker. It was produced by Central Independent Television for one series and seven episodes and aired on the ITV network between 11 June and 23 July 1989.

== Plot ==
The comedy-drama series about Nottingham café owner Eric (Pete Postlethwaite) who has an obsession with the 1942 film Casablanca who dreams of living as Rick Blaine. Very much classic Plater that for some reason didn't resonate with the ITV audience. It was shot on videotape too which gave it a cheaper look than it should have had.

== Cast ==
- Pete Postlethwaite as Eric
- Jill Baker as Sarah
- David Troughton as Det Sgt. Terry
- Robin Soans as Ken
- Bee Jaye as Anita
- Jack Carr as Derek
- Ben Roberts as Malcolm
- Terry Molloy as Bob
- Wayne Foskett as Graham
- Stephen Tompkinson as Kevin
- Anne Dyson as Jess
- Penelope Lee as Catherine
- Lorraine Peters as Eileen

== Episodes ==
Episodes aired on ITV on Sundays at 22:10.

No.	Title	Directed by	Written by	Original release date
1	"Opening Night"	Christopher Menaul	Alan Plater	11 June 1989
2	"Kings of the Midlands"	Pedr James	Mark James, Neil McKay & Betty Burton	18 June 1989
3	"There's a Small Hotel"	Pedr James	Mark James, Neil McKay & Betty Burton	25 June 1989
4	"Back in Your Own Backyard"	Pedr James	Mark James, Neil McKay & Betty Burton	2 July 1989
5	"Stagnight"	Christopher Menaul	David Farnsworth	9 July 1989
6	"Gene Vincent and the Memory Man"	David Attwood	Guy Andrews & Nick Perry	16 July 1989
7	"I Came to Casablanca for the Waters"	David Attwood	Guy Andrews & Nick Perry	23 July 1989

== Filming Locations ==
The shows was set and videotaped in the Jazz Club of Peggy's Skylight in Nottingham, Nottinghamshire.
