= Roger Leach (actor) =

English-Australian actor (1948–2001)

- Born: 22 April 1948; Sydney, Australia
- Died: 1 December 2001 (aged 53); Salisbury, Wiltshire, England
- Occupation: Actor
- Years active: 1971-2001
- Known for: The Bill

Roger Leach (22 April 1948 – 1 December 2001) was an English-Australian actor who played Sgt. Tom Penny in The Bill, and guest starred in Bergerac, Perfect Scoundrels and Doctors.

== Early life ==
Roger was born in Sydney, Australia and read English at Sydney University where he also participated in rowing and other athletics. He won a scholarship to the Central School of Speech and Drama and moved to the UK in 1971. He had many acting roles, including 42 appearances at the Salisbury Playhouse.

== Career ==
Leach became a household name when in 1984 he was asked to become one of the stars in The Bill, a highly successful ITV series about the Metropolitan Police in which he played Sergeant Tom Penny. He was also a successful stage actor. In all he played in 42 productions for artistic director David Horlock and four others at the Salisbury Playhouse. He also toured around Britain in many productions at local repertory theatres. Among these, he played Lambert le Roux in Pravda to critical acclaim, Rev Hale in Arthur Miller's The Crucible, Ebenezer Scrooge in Charles Dickens' A Christmas Carol, Bluntschi in Arms and the Man, Subtle in The Alchemist, Claudio in William Shakespeare's Measure for Measure, and Colin in Ashes, for which feat of achievement he was cast in The Bill.

Leach appeared in a West End production of Anthony Shaffer's play The Case of the Oily Levantine directed by Patrick Dromgoole, and at the Royal Court in Gimme Shelter. In later years he featured as Uncle Max in the Sound of Music, Captain Brackett in South Pacific, the Narrator in The Rocky Horror Show, Doolittle in My Fair Lady, and in 2001, Peachum in a tour of The Threepenny Opera.

Leach was also a director, teaching Shakespeare classes in text and audition techniques at three leading drama schools. He contributed scripts to shows Moon and Son, EastEnders and The Bill. In October 2001, he read the Letters of Beethoven with the Sarum Chamber Orchestra and started rehearsals for The Donkeys Years at the Salisbury Playhouse, which was due to open in January 2002.

Leach died at the age of 53 after a four-year battle with cancer.

== Filmography ==
=== Television ===
List of Television performances
Year	Title	Role	Episode	Source
1975	BBC Play of the Month	Airman	episode: Chips with Everything	
1977	Nicholas Nickleby	Captain Adams	episode 1.5	
1979	Shoestring	D.J.	episode 1.5 Listen To Me	
1983	Bergerac	Tyler	episode 2.3 "Clap Hands, Here Comes Charlie"	
1984–1991	The Bill	Sgt Tom Penny	161 episodes	
1984	The Costs			
1986	Call Me Sister	Hotel Porter	episode 1.1 Long Shot	
1992	Press Gang	Pompous Man	episode 4.1 Bad News	
1992	Perfect Scoundrels	Vicar	episode 3.2 Dirty Tricks	
1993	Inside Victor Lewis-Smith	Old Bill Policeman 1	episode 1.2 Nationwide	

=== Writer ===
List of Plays/Screenplays
Year	Title	Collaboration/episode	Type	Theatre
1990	The Bill	episode: One of Those Days	TV series	
1991	The Bill	episode: Married to the Job	TV series	
2006	Audience with Murder	with Colin Wakefield	Dramatic Comedy	Her Majesty's Theatre
2007	On Your Honour	with Colin Wakefield	Drama	Jermyn Street Theatre

=== Theatre ===
List of Theatrical performances
Year	Title	Role	Theatre
1974	Barchester Towers	Footman	Salisbury Playhouse
1974	An Inspector Calls	ASM/Eric Birling	Salisbury Playhouse
1974	Time and Time Again	ASM/Peter	
1974	All My Sons	ASM (Assistant Stage Manager)	Salisbury Playhouse
1978	Gilgamesh		Playhouse Theatre, Salisbury
1978	Once in a Green Moon		Salisbury Arts Theatre
1979	The Case of the Oily Levantine	Sergeant	Theatre Royal, Bath
1999	My Fair Lady	Alfred Doolittle	Perth Theatre Company
