= Ged Simmons =

British actor (born 1960)

- Born: Ged Simmons; 1960 (age 64–65); Handsworth, West Midlands, England
- Occupation: Actor

Ged Simmons (born 1960) is a British actor who played DI Alex Cullen in The Bill from 2000 to 2002. He has also been in Coronation Street, EastEnders, Bodyguards, Touching Evil, Holby City, Dream Team, The Rotters' Club, Doctors and Spooks.

In 2017, Simmons joined the cast of Harry Potter and the Cursed Child.

He is also the author of a number of screenplays and theatrical works. His first novel, The Gravedigger's Story, was published by impbooks in April 2004.
