= Under Jakob's Ladder =

- Directed by: Mann Munoz
- Written by: R.M.M. Munoz
- Produced by: Roberto Muñoz
- Starring: Jeff Stewart; Christopher Elliott; Sal Rendino
- Cinematography: Jake Forsyth
- Edited by: Mann Munoz
- Music by: Miq Munoz
- Release date: July 24, 2011 (Manhattan Film Festival)
- Running time: 97 minutes
- Country: United States
- Language: English

Under Jakob's Ladder is an independent drama film by CubeCity Entertainment. Based on a true story, it tells how a teacher named Jakob Seel is arrested and thrown into a Soviet prison in 1938. Mann Munoz directed the film and Roberto Munoz produced. Jeff Stewart plays the lead role of Jakob Seel. The film also stars Christopher Elliott, Sal Rendino, Quentin McCuiston, Sean Patrick Folster, Matthew R. Staley, Chloe Roe, and Ken Jennings.

The film is set in the Soviet Union prior to World War II. It features the lives of the ethnic minority Germans from Russia.

== Plot ==
Jakob Seel (Jeff Stewart) struggles with his growing sense of worthlessness after he is dismissed from his position as a teacher in a Soviet village. A neighbor asks him to say a prayer at the funeral of her brother. He agrees, even though he knows it is illegal. Jakob is reported and he is arrested by the secret police later that night. They take him from his daughter and granddaughter, Marta (played by Chloe Roe).

Thrown into prison, Jakob and his fellow political prisoners find themselves under the heel of the ruthless warden: Nikolai (played by Christopher Elliott). Unknown to them, Nikolai has an old vendetta against Jakob. One by one, during the night, prisoners mysteriously disappear. To help distract them from their terror of being taken, Jakob consents to the prisoners' request to form a choir. In doing so, he unexpectedly finds the sense of worth he had craved. As he rehearses the men, he gains their respect, especially that of the embittered prison bully, Bruno (Sal Rendino).

Then one day, the man responsible for Jakob's arrest — Oigen (Ken Jennings) - is also imprisoned. Now, Jakob faces the test of a lifetime — to see if he's ready to forgive the unforgivable.

== Cast ==
- Jeff Stewart as Jakob Seel
- Christopher Elliott as Nikolai
- Sal Rendino as Bruno
- Quentin McCuiston as Yasha
- Sean Patrick Folster as Yosif
- Matthew R. Staley as Karl
- Peter Iasillo, Jr. as Vovik
- Chloe Roe as Marta
- Alexandra Tejeda Rieloff as Emma
- Ken Jennings as Oigen
- Horacio F. Lazo as Pepchik
- Greg Kowalczyk as Rudi

== Based on a true story ==
Under Jakob's Ladder was inspired by the life of a real teacher who lived in the Soviet Union in the 1930s: Jakob Seel. His life story is representative of so many others who lived during Stalinist great purges. He belonged to an ethnic minority called the Germans in Russia.

During the 18th century, Seel's German-speaking ancestors were among those invited by Catherine the Great (and her son Paul and grandson Alexander who ruled after her) to settle the Russian territories. Communist rule was established as a result of the 1917 Russian Revolution, and Joseph Stalin came to power in the late 1920s. In the 1930s, Stalin began his political purges. The secret police would always come at night in a vehicle that was nicknamed the Black Raven. Men became scarce in the villages and it wasn't long before Seel himself was arrested—after praying a simple prayer at a funeral.

== Awards ==
2010 Redemptive Film Festival

- Redemptive Storyteller Award

2011 Manhattan Film Festival

- Best Actor (Jeff Stewart)
- Best Period Piece
