= List of The Bill characters =

The Bill is a long-running British television police procedural television series which ran from 16 August 1983 to the show's cancellation on 31 August 2010, named after a slang term for the police. The characters are all police officers or civilian staff at the fictional Sun Hill police station in London.

== Senior officers ==
The following actors appeared as senior officers in The Bill. Simon Rouse, as Jack Meadows, appeared in 884 episodes, including the series finale "Respect", aired on 31 August 2010. He is the longest serving actor to portray a character in a senior role. Andrew Lancel, as Neil Manson, and Alex Walkinshaw, as "Smithy", also appeared in the series finale. The character of DI Roy Galloway appeared in the pilot episode, "Woodentop", aired on 16 August 1983, played by Robert Pugh. This character would go on to be portrayed by John Salthouse from 1984.

=== Notable senior officers ===
- Peter Ellis played Chief Superintendent Charles Brownlow from the start of the series in 1984 to 2000, when the character tendered his resignation in light of the Don Beech scandal. He was emphatically the longest serving station commander after serving for 16 years, with Adam Okaro a distant second with 4 years. He made a guest appearance in 2002 to attend the funerals of the six officers killed in the station fire.
- Cyril Nri played Superintendent Adam Okaro from 2002 to 2006, initially replacing the deceased Tom Chandler as Superintendent before accepting a promotion to Borough Commander in 2006. He was the highest ranking black officer in the series' history.
- Christopher Ellison appeared intermittently between 1984 and 2000 as Frank Burnside. A majority of his time on screen was as a DI; however, he was a DS when he first appeared, and had become a DCI by the time he left. Ellison's popularity as the rogue officer led to an ill-fated spinoff Burnside after his exit in 2000 which lasted for one series.
- Lisa Maxwell played DI Samantha Nixon from 2002 to 2009, when the character transferred to the child exploitation unit.
- Roberta Taylor played Inspector Gina Gold from 2002 to 2008, the character leaving due to the stress of the job.
- Simon Rouse played Detective Chief Inspector/Superintendent Jack Meadows from 1992 until the series finale. He was the longest-serving character to appear in the finale. He was with the show for 20 years; however, he was a guest character in 1990 and 1991.
- Colin Tarrant played Inspector Andrew Monroe from 1990 to 2002, replacing Christine Frazer. He appeared in over 700 episodes, more than any other high-ranking uniform officer. Only Simon Rouse as Jack Meadows had more appearances by a senior officer during the series' history. The character was killed in the Sun Hill explosion in 2002.
- Ben Roberts played Chief Inspector Derek Conway from 1988 to 2002. He was the second-longest serving uniform manager, with his 14 years only eclipsed by the 16 years of Charles Brownlow. The character was killed by Jeff Simpson in a drive-by petrol bomb attack.
- Alex Walkinshaw played Dale "Smithy" Smith from 1999 until the series finale. Walkinshaw had made three one-off appearances in the series before becoming a regular member of the cast. He returned to the show in 2003, having been a PC between 1999 and 2001, by then promoted to Sergeant. He spent six years as a Sergeant, taking centre stage in several major storylines; they included the death of two lovers, one of which led to a false imprisonment, while he was stabbed on duty in his later days as a Sergeant. During the 2009 revamp, he was promoted to Inspector, holding that rank until the show ceased production in 2010.

=== Overview ===
Character	Actor	Duration	Episodes	Ranks
Adam Okaro	Cyril Nri	2002–2006	204	Supt (2002–2006); Ch Supt (Borough Cmdr) (2006)
Charles Brownlow	Peter Ellis	1984–2000	346	Ch Supt
Jack Meadows	Simon Rouse	1990–2010 (recurring 1990–1992)	884	DSI (1990–1992); DCI (1992–2009); Supt (2009–2010)
Kim Reid	Carolyn Pickles	1990–1992	53	DCI (1990–1992); Det Supt (1992)
John Heaton	Daniel Flynn	2006–2009	132	Supt
Tom Chandler	Steven Hartley	2000–2002	115	Supt
Derek Conway	Ben Roberts	1988–2002	402	Ch Insp (1988–2002); A/Supt (1994–1996)
Philip Cato	Philip Whitchurch	1993–1995	77	Ch Insp
Frank Burnside	Christopher Ellison	1984–1986, 1988–1993, 1998–2000	250	DS (1984–1986); DI (1988–1993); DCI (1998–2000)
Neil Manson	Andrew Lancel	2003–2010	275	DI (2003–2010); A/DCI (2005)
Samantha Nixon	Lisa Maxwell	2002–2009	281	DS (2002, 2003–2007); A/DI (2002–2003); DI (2007–2009)
Chris Deakin	Shaun Scott	1994–2000	265	DS (1994–1995); A/DI (1995); DI (1995–2000)
Liz Rawton	Libby Davison	1996–1999	135	DC (1996–1999); DS (2000); DI (2001)
Alex Cullen	Ged Simmons	2000–2002	80	DI
Sally Johnson	Jaye Griffiths	1993–1995	70	DS (1993); DI (1994–1995); PI (2003)
Roy Galloway	John Salthouse	1984–1987	35	DI
Claire Stanton	Clara Salaman	1999–2000	33	DS (1999–2000); DI (2001)
Dale "Smithy" Smith	Alex Walkinshaw	1999–2001, 2003–2010	387	PC (1999–2001); Sgt (2003–2009); Insp (2009–2010)
Andrew Monroe	Colin Tarrant	1990–2002	704	Insp
Gina Gold	Roberta Taylor	2002–2008	344	Insp
Christine Frazer	Barbara Thorn	1988–1990	61	Insp
Rachel Weston	Claire Goose	2008–2009	41	Sgt (2008); Insp (2008–2009)

=== Senior officers timeline ===
Character	Years																											
Character	83	84	85	86	87	88	89	90	91	92	93	94	95	96	97	98	99	00	01	02	03	04	05	06	07	08	09	10
Superintendents
Ch Supt Charles Brownlow																												
Supt Jack Meadows								Det Supt	Det Supt	Det Supt																	Supt	Supt
Det Supt Kim Reid																												
A/Supt Derek Conway												A/Supt	A/Supt	A/Supt														
Supt Tom Chandler																												
Supt Adam Okaro																												
Supt John Heaton																												
Chief Inspectors
Ch Insp Derek Conway																												
Ch Insp Philip Cato																												
Detective Chief Inspectors
DCI Kim Reid																												
DCI Frank Burnside																												
DCI Jack Meadows																												
Inspectors
Insp Christine Frazer																												
Insp Andrew Monroe																												
Insp Gina Gold																												
Insp Rachel Weston																												
Insp Dale Smith																												
Detective Inspectors
DI Roy Galloway																												
DI Frank Burnside																												
DI Sally Johnson																												
DI Chris Deakin																												
DI Alex Cullen																												
DI Liz Rawton																												
DI Claire Stanton																												
DI Samantha Nixon																				A/DI	A/DI							
DI Neil Manson																												

== Sergeants ==
The following actors portrayed Sergeants and Detective Sergeants. Both of the series' original lead actors, Trudie Goodwin and Mark Wingett, portrayed Sergeants, with Goodwin appearing in 978 episodes as Sergeant June Ackland, and Wingett appearing in 784 episodes as DS Jim Carver. Sally Rogers, Sam Callis, Christopher Fox and Lucy Speed, as Sergeants Jo Masters, Callum Stone, Max Carter, and Stevie Moss, respectively, appeared in the series finale "Respect". Eric Richard's role as Sergeant Bob Cryer was widely lauded as the standout performance on The Bill. Sergeant Matthew Boyden, played by Tony O'Callaghan, is notable as the murder of his character launched the spin-off series Murder Investigation Team in 2003.

=== Notable sergeants ===
- Billy Murray appeared in The Bill between 1995 and 2000, playing DS Don Beech. He spent five years at Sun Hill, eventually going on the run after accidentally killing DS John Boulton when his corruption caught up with him. He was involved in a six-part mini-series, Beech is Back, after a 90-minute special aired in Australia in 2001, eventually being jailed for murder by Boulton's former fiancée, Claire Stanton. Beech made six guest appearances in 2004 before escaping from prison.
- Tony O'Callaghan played Sgt Matt Boyden for 12 years, from 1991 to 2003. Boyden was involved in several major storylines including two relationships with underage girls, and a long-running plot involving his daughter Amy's drug addiction, a recurring storyline that led to the character's death when Boyden was shot dead by his daughter's boyfriend so that she could profit from Boyden's life insurance. Tony O'Callaghan also appeared in an earlier episode as a criminal (series 5 episode 81).
- Eric Richard played Sgt Bob Cryer from 1984 to 2004, holding the record for the show's longest serving Sergeant (17 years). The character retired in 2001 when he was accidentally shot by then PC Dale Smith; however, he made a number of recurring appearances between 2002 and 2004.
- Tony Scannell played DS Ted Roach from 1984 to 1993, when the character left Sun Hill after punching Inspector Andrew Monroe. He made two guest appearances in 2000 before the character was killed off-screen in 2004.
- Trudie Goodwin played June Ackland from 1983 to 2007, appearing first in Woodentop. She began as a WPC before promotion to Sergeant in 1996, holding that rank until the character retired in 2007, having fallen in love with school teacher Rod Jessop (Richard Hope). Ackland's storylines included being targeted by an assassin, being wrongfully arrested for corruption, marrying long-term friend DC Jim Carver, being the target of an elaborate revenge plot by PC Gabriel Kent, and being critically injured in a collision with the station's area car. When Goodwin left The Bill in 2007 she was not only the longest serving cast member in the history of The Bill, but also held the world record for the longest time an actor has portrayed a police character.

=== Overview ===
Character	Actor	Duration	Episodes	Ranks
June Ackland	Trudie Goodwin	1983–2007	978	PC (1984–1996); Sgt (1996–2007)
Jo Masters	Sally Rogers	2005–2010	177	DC (2005–2010); Sgt (2010)
Callum Stone	Sam Callis	2007–2010	100	Sgt
Bob Cryer	Eric Richard	1984–2004	789	Sgt
Matt Boyden	Tony O'Callaghan	1991–2003	702	Sgt
Alec Peters	Larry Dann	1984–1992, 2004	173	Sgt
Tom Penny	Roger Leach	1984–1990	141	Sgt
Ray Steele	Robert Perkins	1993–1996	136	Sgt
Craig Gilmore	Hywel Simons	2001–2003	101	Sgt
John Maitland	Sam Miller	1990–1993	80	Sgt
Nikki Wright	Gillian Taylforth	2006–2008	56	Sgt
Joseph Corrie	Roland Oliver	1990-1991	10	Sgt
Diane Noble	Kaye Wragg	2006–2009	61	PC (2006–2009); Sgt (2009)
Sheelagh Murphy	Bernie Nolan	2003–2005	119	Sgt (2003–2004); PC (2004–2005)
Yvonne Hemmingway	Michele Austin	2003–2006	157	PC/ (2003–2006); A/Sgt (2004, 2005); Sgt (2006)
Max Carter	Christopher Fox	2007–2010	69	DS
Rosie Fox	Caroline Catz	1998–2000	10	PC (1998); DS (1999–2000)
Alistair Greig	Andrew Mackintosh	1989–1998	288	DS
Stevie Moss	Lucy Speed	2008–2010	62	DC (2008–2009); DS (2009–2010)
Phil Hunter	Scott Maslen	2002–2007	240	DS
Ted Roach	Tony Scannell	1984–1993	210	DS
Debbie McAllister	Natalie Roles	2000–2004	192	DS
Don Beech	Billy Murray	1995–2000	186	DS
Mike Dashwood	Jon Iles	1984–1992	155	DC (1984–1992); DS (1996)
John Boulton	Russell Boulter	1995–2000	138	DC (1994); DS (1995–2000)
Geoff Daly	Ray Ashcroft	1996–2000	115	DS
Danny Pearce	Martin Marquez	1993–1995	80	DS
Jo Morgan	Mary Jo Randle	1993–1995	62	DC (1993); DS (1993–1995)
Vik Singh	Raji James	2000–2002	43	DS
Stuart Turner	Doug Rao	2006–2009	108	DC (2006); DS (2006–2009)
Ramani DeCosta	Thusitha Jayasundera	2003–2006	92	DC (2003); DS (2003–2006); A/DI (2005)

=== Sergeants timeline ===
Character	Years																											
Character	83	84	85	86	87	88	89	90	91	92	93	94	95	96	97	98	99	00	01	02	03	04	05	06	07	08	09	10
Sergeant A
Sgt Bob Cryer																												
Sgt Craig Gilmore																												
Sgt Dale Smith																												
Sgt Jo Masters																												
Sergeant B
Sgt Tom Penny																												
Sgt John Maitland																												
Sgt Ray Steele																												
Sgt June Ackland																												
Sgt Callum Stone																												
Sergeant C
Sgt Alec Peters																												
Sgt Matthew Boyden																												
Sgt Sheelagh Murphy																												
Sgt Yvonne Hemmingway																							A/Sgt	A/Sgt				
Sgt Nikki Wright																												
Sgt Rachel Weston																												
Sgt Diane Noble																												
Detective Sergeant A
DS Ted Roach																												
DS Danny Pearce																												
DS John Boulton																												
DS Debbie McAllister																												
Detective Sergeant B
DS Frank Burnside																												
DS Alistair Greig																												
DS Claire Stanton																												
DS Vik Singh																												
DS Phil Hunter																												
DS Max Carter																												
Detective Sergeant C
DS Jo Morgan																												
DS Geoff Daly																												
DS Samantha Nixon																												
Detective Sergeant D
DS Chris Deakin																												
DS Don Beech																												
DS Ramani De Costa																												
DS Stuart Turner																												
DS Stevie Moss																												

== Detective constables ==
The Bill's roster of Detective Constables investigate crimes under the direction of their sergeants. Kevin Lloyd, as Alfred "Tosh" Lines, appeared in more episodes than any other DC, in 383 between 1988 and 1998. In the series finale, "Respect", Amita Dhiri, Chris Simmons, Patrick Robinson and Bruce Byron play Constables Grace Dasari, Mickey Webb, Jacob Banks and Terry Perkins, respectively. Other notable Detective Constables include Eva Sharpe, played by Diane Parish, who departed in 2004 but went on to headline the second series of Murder Investigation Team in 2005, and Rae Baker as Juliet Becker, who departed the series in the 2003 live episode "Fatal Consequences".

=== Notable DCs ===
- Kevin Lloyd played DC Tosh Lines from 1988 to 1998, when the character was written out after accepting a position in the Coroner's Office, but his off-screen axing was highly publicised due to Lloyd's addiction to alcohol. After turning up to work drunk, he was dismissed by show producers, and Lloyd tragically died a week after his dismissal. His son, James Lloyd, later played PC Steve Hunter from 2004 to 2006.
- Mark Wingett played DC Jim Carver from 1983 to 2007. Carver was the main character in the pilot episode after joining as a probationary PC. He became a DC in 1989 before returning to uniform in 1999. He returned to CID in 2004 before his departure in the wake of the 2005 station fire; however, he returned as a DS for three guest appearances in 2007, appearing in Trudie Goodwin's final episodes as Sergeant June Ackland. Carver's storylines included addictions to alcohol and gambling, a marriage in which he was domestically abused and a second to long-term friend June.
- Chris Simmons played DC Mickey Webb from 2000 to 2010. He made two guest appearances in 1998 and 1999 before joining the cast as a regular the following year. He transferred from Sun Hill in 2003 after being raped by a suspect; however, his move to the Murder Investigation Team, and later the National Crime Squad, saw him return for several guest appearances. In 2005, he returned to Sun Hill after being demoted from DS at the NCS.

=== Overview ===
Character	Actor	Duration	Episodes	Ranks
Jim Carver	Mark Wingett	1983–2005	784	PC (1984–1986, 1999–2003); DC (1987–1999, 2003–2005); DS (2007; episodes 487–489 only)
Tony "Yorkie" Smith	Robert Hudson	1984–1990	83	PC (1984–1990); DC (South Yorkshire Police, 1991)
Viv Martella	Nula Conwell	1984–1993	203	PC (1984–1990); DC (1990–1993)
Alfred "Tosh" Lines	Kevin Lloyd	1988–1998	383	DC
Alan Woods	Tom Cotcher	1992–1996	173	DC
Suzi Croft	Kerry Peers	1993–1998	221	PC (1993–1994); DC (1994–1998)
Rod Skase	Iain Fletcher	1994–2000	245	DC
Tom Proctor	Gregory Donaldson	1997–2000	100	DC
Kerry Holmes	Joy Brook	1998–2000	80	DC
Duncan Lennox	George Rossi	1998–2003	189	DC
Danny Glaze	Karl Collins	1999–2003	157	DC
Paul Riley	Gary Grant	2000–2002	39	DC
Kate Spears	Tania Emery	2000–2002	41	DC
Mickey Webb	Chris Simmons	2000–2010	333	DC (2000–2004, 2005–2010); DS (2005)
Brandon Kane	Pal Aron	2002–2004	72	T/DC (2002–2003); DC (2003–2004)
Eva Sharpe	Diane Parish	2002–2004	91	DC
Ken Drummond	Russell Floyd	2002–2005	112	DC
Gary Best	Ciarán Griffiths	2002–2005	162	PC (2002–2004); DC (2004–2005)
Juliet Becker	Rae Baker	2003	26	DC
Rob Thatcher	Brian Bovell	2003–2004	54	DC
Terry Perkins	Bruce Byron	2003–2010	210	DC
Suzie Sim	Wendy Kweh	2004–2006	83	DC
Zain Nadir	TJ Ramini	2005–2007	80	DC
Will Fletcher	Gary Lucy	2005–2010	167	PC (2005–2008); T/DC (2008–2009); DC (2009–2010)
Kezia Walker	Cat Simmons	2006–2009	98	T/DC (2006–2008); DC (2008–2009)
Grace Dasari	Amita Dhiri	2007–2010	95	DC
Jacob "Banksy" Banks	Patrick Robinson	2008–2010	65	DC

=== DCs timeline ===
Character	Years																											
Character	83	84	85	86	87	88	89	90	91	92	93	94	95	96	97	98	99	00	01	02	03	04	05	06	07	08	09	10
DC Mike Dashwood																												
DC Jim Carver																												
DC Alfred Lines																												
DC Viv Martella																												
DC Alan Woods																												
DC Suzi Croft																												
DC Rod Skase																												
DC Liz Rawton																												
DC Tom Proctor																												
DC Duncan Lennox																												
DC Kerry Holmes																												
DC Danny Glaze																												
DC Paul Riley																												
DC Kate Spears																												
DC Mickey Webb																												
DC Brandon Kane																				T/DC	T/DC							
DC Eva Sharpe																												
DC Ken Drummond																												
DC Terry Perkins																												
DC Juliet Becker																												
DC Ramani De Costa																												
DC Rob Thatcher																												
DC Stuart Turner																												
DC Suzie Sim																												
DC Gary Best																						T/DC	T/DC					
DC Jo Masters																												
DC Zain Nadir																												
DC Kezia Walker																								T/DC	T/DC			
DC Grace Dasari																												
DC Stevie Moss																												
DC Jacob Banks																												
DC Will Fletcher																											T/DC	T/DC

== Police constables ==
The largest proportion of the cast play uniformed police constables. Gary Olsen appeared as Dave Litten in "Woodentop", the series pilot, as well as the entire first series, before returning as a guest star in 1986. He was the actor who appeared in the fewest episodes as a series regular. Colin Blumenau also appears in the pilot episode, as Taffy Edwards, though his character was then called Taffy Morgan. Jeff Stewart, as Reg Hollis, appeared in 1,021 episodes between 1984 and 2008, while Graham Cole appeared as Tony Stamp in 1,204 episodes between 1984 and 2009 . Hollis and Stamp are the series' longest-serving characters, though Stamp did not become a regular member of the cast until series 4. The series finale, "Respect," features five PCs: Micah Balfour as Benjamin Gayle, Dominic Power as Leon Taylor, John Bowler as Roger Valentine, Rhea Bailey as Mel Ryder and Sarah Manners as Kirsty Knight. Ben Richards starred in Series 26 as Nate Roberts, but did not appear in "Respect".

=== Notable PCs ===
- Huw Higginson played PC George Garfield from 1989 to 1999, when the character left after his colleague Dave Quinnan had an affair with his girlfriend, Nurse Jenny Delaney.
- Andrew Paul played PC Dave Quinnan from 1989 to 2002, when the character left to transfer to SO10. He was involved in a major storyline in 1999 that saw him stabbed on duty after being ambushed by a gang of youths.
- Lisa Geoghan played PC Polly Page from 1992 to 2004. After assisting a friend's suicide, she was wrongly jailed for murder, but later returned to Sun Hill for a brief stint as a Civilian CAD Officer before resigning.
- Jeff Stewart played PC Reg Hollis from 1984 to 2008. The character was written out off-screen by having him resign after being traumatised by the death of colleagues in a bomb blast. After appearing in over 1000 episodes, he was controversially axed from the show in 2008, reportedly leading Stewart to attempt suicide on set.
- Graham Cole played PC Tony Stamp from 1984 to 2009. The character was written out as part of a revamp of the show after producers decided that he didn't fit the new format. Cole's last episode, in which he transferred to Hendon as an advanced driving instructor, was shown on 5 November 2009; his departure meant that The Bill had no original characters remaining.

=== Overview ===
Character	Actor	Duration	Episodes	Ranks
Benjamin Gayle	Micah Balfour	2007–2010	108	PC
Dave Litten	Gary Olsen	1983–1986	12	PC
Roger Valentine	John Bowler	2004–2010	227	PC
Leon Taylor	Dominic Power	2008–2010	70	PC
Kirsty Knight	Sarah Manners	2010	19	PC
Mel Ryder	Rhea Bailey	2008–2010	69	PC
Reg Hollis	Jeff Stewart	1984–2008	1021	PC
Polly Page	Lisa Geoghan	1992–2004	604	PC (1992–2004); CAD Officer (2004)
Dan Casper	Chris Jarvis	2005–2007	114	PC
Francis "Taffy" Edwards	Colin Blumenau	1983–1990	111	PC
Cathy Bradford	Connie Hyde	2002–2004	91	PC
Nate Roberts	Ben Richards	2007–2010	90	PC
Jamila Blake	Lolita Chakrabarti	1996–1999	82	PC
Sally Armstrong	Ali Bastian	2007–2009	74	PC
Roz Clarke	Holly Davidson	2000–2001	46	PC
Robin Frank	Ashley Gunstock	1984–1989	41	PC
Timothy Able	Mark Haddigan	1989–1990	32	PC
Ruby Buxton	Nicola Alexis	2002–2003	28	PC
Adam Bostock	Carl Brincat	1994	21	PC
Norika Datta	Seeta Indrani	1989–1998	408	PC
Claire Brind	Kelly Lawrence	1988–1989	52	PC
Andrea Dunbar	Natalie J. Robb	2004–2005	56	PC
Suzanne Ford	Vicky Gee-Dare	1988–1992	86	PC
Millie Brown	Clare Foster	2008–2009	52	PC
Delia French	Natasha Williams	1990–1992	39	PC
George Garfield	Huw Higginson	1989–1999	671	PC
Beth Green	Louisa Lytton	2007–2009	59	PC
Kerry Young	Beth Cordingly	2002–2004	133	PC
Tony Stamp	Graham Cole	1984–2009	1204	PC
Cameron Tait	Daniel MacPherson	2003–2004	75	PC
Luke Ashton	Scott Neal	1997–1999, 2002–2003	126	PC
Gabriel Kent	Todd Carty	2003–2005	118	PC
Honey Harman	Kim Tiddy	2003–2007	191	PC
Emma Keane	Melanie Gutteridge	2006–2008	97	PC
Arun Ghir	Abhin Galeya	2008–2009	25	PC
Lewis Hardy	Aml Ameen	2006–2007	69	PC
Steve Hunter	James Lloyd	2004–2006	82	PC
Lance Powell	Ofo Uhiara	2004–2005	67	PC
Vicky Hagen	Samantha Robson	1998–2001	148	PC
Sam Harker	Matthew Crompton	1997–2002	192	PC
Donna Harris	Louise Harrison	1991–1996	178	PC
Malcolm Haynes	Eamonn Walker	1988–1989	54	PC
Ben Hayward	Ben Peyton	2000–2002	55	PC
Dave Quinnan	Andrew Paul	1989–2002	710	PC
Leela Kapoor	Seema Bowri	2004–2007	106	PC
Mike Jarvis	Stephen Beckett	1993–1998	311	PC
Debbie Keane	Andrea Mason	1995–1998	205	PC
Nick Klein	René Zagger	1999–2004	199	PC
Steve Loxton	Tom Butcher	1990–1997	468	PC
Laura Bryant	Melanie Kilburn	2004–2006	54	PCSO (2004–2005); PC (2005–2006)
Amber Johannsen	Myfanwy Waring	2004–2005	59	PC
Cathy Marshall	Lynne Miller	1989–1996	348	PC
Gary McCann	Clive Wedderburn	1992–2000	388	PC
Ken Melvin	Mark Powley	1987–1990	104	PC
Gemma Osbourne	Jane Danson	2002–2003	31	PC
Pete Ramsey	Nick Reding	1988–1989	49	PC
Cass Rickman	Suzanne Maddock	1999–2002	180	PC
Eddie Santini	Michael Higgs	1998–1999	62	PC
Nick Slater	Alan Westaway	1995–1997	144	PC
Ron Smollett	Nick Stringer	1990–1993	81	PC
Des Taviner	Paul Usher	2001–2004	135	PC
Barry Stringer	Jonathan Dow	1990–1993	160	PC
Di Worrell	Jane Wall	1999–2002	117	PC
Richard Turnham	Chris Humphreys	1989–1990	33	PC
Phil Young	Arin Alldridge	1989–1991	65	PC

=== PCs timeline ===
Character	Years																											
Character	83	84	85	86	87	88	89	90	91	92	93	94	95	96	97	98	99	00	01	02	03	04	05	06	07	08	09	10
Area Car Drivers
PC Tony Stamp																												
PC Robin Frank																												
PC Steve Loxton																												
PC Mike Jarvis																												
PC Vicky Hagen																												
PC Des Taviner																												
PC Gemma Osbourne																												
PC Yvonne Hemmingway																												
PC Will Fletcher																												
PC Kirsty Knight																												
Collators
PC Reg Hollis																												
PC Cathy Marshall																												
PC Ron Smollett																												
PC Donna Harris																												
Federation Representative
PC George Garfield																												
PC Barry Stringer																												
PC Nick Klein																												

== Civilian staff ==
In addition to its large ensemble of police officers The Bill also features supporting actors in auxiliary roles. Jason Barnett, as Crime Scene Examiner Eddie Olosunje, appeared in the series finale "Respect", after appearing regularly from 2008. Moya Brady's character, Robbie Cryer, is notable for being the niece of Sergeant Bob Cryer, played by Eric Richard. Marilyn Chambers, played by Vickie Gates, was engaged to PC Reg Hollis (Jeff Stewart), while Rochelle Barrett, played by Anna Acton, was married to Chief Superintendent Ian Barrett and embarked on an affair with PC Dan Casper.

=== Overview ===
Character	Actor	Duration	Episodes	Ranks
Eddie Olosunje	Jason Barnett	2008–2010	71	CSE
Matt Hinckley	Mark Dexter	2006–2007	30	Senior Crown Prosecutor
Jonathan Fox	Larry Lamb	2004–2005	22	Senior Crown Prosecutor
Roberta Cryer	Moya Brady	2002–2003	72	SRO
Marilyn Chambers	Vickie Gates	2003–2005	64	SRO
Julian Tavell	Nick Patrick	2005–2006	32	SRO
Marion Layland	Susan Majolier	1988–1999	48	PA to Ch Supt Brownlow
Dean McVerry	Luke Hamill	2003–2006	53	CAD Officer
Mia Perry	Jo Anne Knowles	2006–2007	22	Press Officer
Rochelle Barrett	Anna Acton	2005	20	Drugs Referral Officer
Margaret Barnes	Annabelle Apsion	2004–2005	20	Contract cleaner

== Recurring cast and characters ==
The Bill features a number of recurring characters, who star alongside the main cast in multiple episodes of the series. Several of these actors are notable for their appearances in other series. Richard Hope, who played Rod Jessop, for example, had previously starred as DS Barry Purvis in sister series Murder Investigation Team. Rosie Marcel, who played Louise Larson, would later star in BBC's Holby City as surgeon Jac Naylor, alongside The Bill alumni Alex Walkinshaw and Kaye Wragg.

=== Police officers ===
Character	Actor	Duration	Episodes	Ranks
Trevor Hicks	Mike Burnside	1990–1999	22	DAC; AC
Georgia Hobbs	Kazia Pelka	2006–2007	11	DAC
Roy Pearson	Adam Bareham	2004–2005	5	DAC
Lisa Kennedy	Julie Graham	2010	7	Cdr
Guy Mannion	Nick Miles	1999–2001	13	Ch Supt
Jane Fitzwilliam	Maureen Beattie	2002–2003	9	Ch Supt
Louise Campbell	Sarah Winman	2003–2005	3	Ch Supt
Ian Barrett	John McArdle	2005	8	Ch Supt
Stuart Lamont	Steve Morley	1989–2001	41	Sgt
Amanda Prosser	Serena Gordon	2005	8	Supt
Rowanne Morell	Tanya Franks	2004–2005	22	DI; DCI
Andrew Ross	Ron Donachie	2002–2004	15	DCI
Frank Keane	Lorcan Cranitch	2006	7	DCI
Gordon Wray	Clive Wood	1990	13	DCI
Paul Strich	Mark Spalding	1995	13	Ch Insp
Harry Haines	Gary Whelan	1992–1995	21	DI
Karen Lacy	Liz May Brice	2008	4	DI
Brian Kite	Simon Slater	1987	12	Insp
Joseph Corrie	Roland Oliver	1990–1991	5	Sgt
Jane Kendall	Liz Crowther	1993	5	Sgt
Tom Baker	Victor Gallucci	1990–2001	27	DC
Lorna Hart	Siobhan Redmond	2006–2007	13	CSE
Terry Knowles	Alex Avery	2001–2002	4	SC
Colin Fairfax	Tim Steed	2005	8	PCSO
Abe Lyttleton	Ronnie Cush	1985–1986	8	PC
Pete Muswell	Ralph Brown	1985–1986	11	PC
Danesh Patel	Sonesh Sira	1987	7	PC
Nick Shaw	Chris Walker	1985–1987	17	PC
Michelle Hughes	Gail Abbott	1991–1998	23	PC
Paul Timpney	Roger Griffiths	1999–2000	7	DS
Peter Cork	Tristan Gemmill	2001	6	DS
Doug Wright	Adrian Lukis	2006–2007	6	Sgt
Marc Rollins	Stefan Booth	2004–2005	18	Sgt
Steve Hodges	Pete Lee-Wilson	2000	14	Det Supt

=== Civilians ===
Character	Actor	Duration	Episodes	Role
Rod Jessop	Richard Hope	2006–2007	15	Husband of Sgt June Ackland
Irene Radford	Lynda Bellingham	2004	19	Adversary of DC Rob Thatcher
Louise Larson	Rosie Marcel	2005–2006	12	Former girlfriend of Insp Dale Smith
Abigail Nixon	Georgia Moffett	2002–2009	26	Daughter of DI Samantha Nixon
Cindy Hunter	Jacqueline Defferary	2002–2006	28	Wife of DS Phil Hunter
Kristen Shaw	Christine Stephen-Daly	2006–2007	20	Girlfriend of DC Zain Nadir
Scott Burnett	Matt Bardock	2005	17	Ex-husband of PC Honey Harman
Nurse Jenny Delaney	Lesley McGuire	1999–2001	25	Ex-wife of PC Dave Quinnan
James Tennant	Neil Stuke	2006–2007	18	Father of Amy Tennant
Dr Tom Kent	David Quilter	1990–1997	18	FME

== Notable guest stars ==
This is a list of some of the most notable actors (or actors who later became well known) to have made brief or cameo appearances in The Bill.

- Keira Knightley (at the start of her career) played child burglar Sheena Rose in a 1995 episode titled "Swan Song".
- Martin Freeman played Craig Parnell in a 1997 episode.
- Russell Brand (years before he became well-known) played teenager Billy Case in a 1994 episode titled "Land of the Blind".
- David Tennant (at the start of his career) played kidnapper Steven Clemens in a 1995 episode called "Deadline".
- Paul O'Grady – credited as "Paul Savage" – played transvestite prostitute Roxanne in three episodes between 1988 and 1990.
- Sean Bean (shortly after he graduated) played robber Horace Clark in an episode titled "Long Odds" in 1984.
- Ralf Little played Tommy Lawson in four episodes in the original serial rapist storyline in 2001: "Judas Kiss", "Shout", "Aftershock" and "Night Games".
- Emma Bunton (before she joined the Spice Girls) played the role of Janice in one episode, "Missionary Work", in 1993.
- Catherine Tate (in her early acting career) appeared in "Give and Take" in 1993 and "Fly on the Wall" in 1994.
- James McAvoy (in his early acting career) played a Scots runaway named Gavin in an episode titled "Rent" in 1997.
- Lewis Collins played a stem cell scientist named Dr Peter Allen in an episode in 2002.
- Lorraine Kelly appeared as herself in 2003 in an episode in which PC Cathy Bradford appeared on her show on GMTV.
- Roger Daltrey appeared as reformed drug addict Larry Moore in a 1999 episode titled "Cracked Up".
- Charlotte Jordan (in her first television appearance) played Jemma Jackson in 2007 episode "Crash Test".
- Kathy Burke played an unfortunate video shop scam victim in a 1989 episode titled “Leaving”.
- Stephen Graham played Jason Barrat in a 2001 episode “Cruise Control”.
