= Stephen Tredre =

English actor and writer (1963–1997)

- Born: Stephen Ralph Tredre; 17 July 1963; London, England
- Died: 8 December 1997 (aged 34); Islington, London, England
- Occupations: Actor; writer
- Partner: Kate Winslet (1991–1995)

Stephen Ralph Tredre (17 July 1963 – 8 December 1997) was an English actor and writer.

The son of a doctor, he was born in London and educated at Epsom College, appearing as the lead role in a school production of Hamlet. Tredre also wrote articles for the school magazine, which was edited by his brother. After studying drama and English at Exeter University, he graduated from the Royal Academy of Dramatic Art.

Following graduation, he appeared on the stage in Manchester and London, and then in film and television productions such as ITV's The Bill. While on the set of Dark Season, Tredre met actress Kate Winslet with whom he had a five-year relationship, starting when she was 15 years old and he was 27. The couple broke up in 1995, at Tredre's insistence.

Tredre began to write while still working as an actor. Having had scripts accepted to the BBC soap opera EastEnders, he then joined the soap's rota of writers. After being diagnosed with cancer in 1996, he wrote the short personal memoir film Between Dreams, and had his six-part legal series Fish accepted by the BBC, which cast Paul McGann in the lead role. Tredre finished an EastEnders script from his bed in his home in Islington, two weeks before his death from bone cancer on 8 December 1997 (soon after Winslet completed filming Titanic). Attending his funeral caused her to miss the film's premiere in Los Angeles on 14 December.

== Filmography ==
- Dark Season – 1991
- She-Wolf of London – 1991
- The Bill – 1990
