= The Rainbow (1988 serial) =

1988 BBC miniseries

- Written by: D. H. Lawrence; Anne Devlin
- Directed by: Stuart Burge
- Starring: Imogen Stubbs; Martin Wenner; Kate Buffery
- Music by: Simon Rogers
- Country of origin: United Kingdom
- Original language: English
- No. of series: 1
- No. of episodes: 3

Production
- Producer: Chris Parr
- Cinematography: John Kenway
- Editor: John Rosser
- Running time: 180 minutes

Original release
- Network: BBC
- Release: 4 December – 18 December 1988

The Rainbow is a BBC television three-episode serial of 1988 directed by Stuart Burge, adapted from the D. H. Lawrence novel The Rainbow (1915).

== Outline ==
Ursula Brangwen is the eldest child of Will Brangwen, a farmer, and his wife Anna. She has a fascination with rainbows and one day she runs away from home looking for the pot of gold at the end of one.

As a teenager, Ursula has a crush on Winifred Inger, her gym mistress at the girls' high school, and she also has romantic feelings for Anton Skrebensky, who is at the boys' high school. They spend a lot of time together, including hill walking. Ursula agrees to become a nude model for a local artist, but she walks out after he makes a pass at her. She is jealous when Winifred gets engaged to her Uncle Henry. Ursula and Anton leave school. He joins the army and goes to fight in the Second Boer War, while she moves to London and gets a job as a schoolteacher at an elementary school in the East End of London, where she has to fend off unwanted advances from the headmaster of the school.

A year later, in the spring of 1901, Ursula returns to the farm and meets Anton, just home from the war, and they begin an affair. Ursula also starts to work for the Derbyshire miners union. When she thinks she is pregnant, Anton wants to marry her, but she turns him down, and he goes away. After fighting off an attempted rape by two miners, Ursula gets a telegram from Anton to say he has married someone else and has been posted to British India.

During a rainstorm, a rainbow appears, and Ursula packs a suitcase and again runs away from home, chasing the rainbow.

Her story is continued in D. H. Lawrence's novel Women in Love.

== Cast ==
- Imogen Stubbs as Ursula Brangwen
- Robyn Cooper as Young Ursula Brangwen
- Martin Wenner as Anton Skrebensky
- Kate Buffery as Winifred Inger
- Colin Tarrant as Will Brangwen
- Jane Gurnett as Anna Brangwen
- John Evitts as Mr Harby
- John Tams as Mr Brunt
- Clare Holman as Gudrun Brangwen
- Roy Spencer as Vicar
- Emma Kedge as Ethel
- Martin Bettridge as Billy Brangwen
- Tom Bell as Old Tom Brangwen
- Jon Finch as Uncle Tom
- Eileen Way as Lydia Brangwen
- Claire Thompson as Catherine
- Kathryn Brown as Cassie
- Tom Bailey as Williams
- Paul Duke as Billy
- Emma Chambers as Margaret
- Sarah-Jane Holm as Dorothy
- Fabia Drake as Aunt Olga
- David Beames as Uncle Fred
- Phyllida Hewatt as Mrs Phillips
- Amelda Brown as Maggie Schofield
- Marjie Lawrence as Ethel
- Lola Almudevar as Catherine Brangwen
- Dilys Hamlett as Dr Frankstone
- Sarah Crowden as Catherine Phillips
- Cate Hamer as Louisa Phillips
- John MacKay as Eddie
- Graeme Aston as Wright
- Graham Barlow as Hill
- Annette Kashdan as Cassie
- Amy Bell as Young Anna Brangwen
- Laurie Eastwood as Margaret Brangwen
- Suzy Roper as Theresa Brangwen
- Aran Bell as Clem Phillips
- Brian Hickey as David Schofield
