= Dark River (1990 film) =

- Directed by: Malcolm Taylor
- Written by: Malcolm Taylor
- Produced by: Malcolm Taylor
- Starring: Tom Bell; Kate Buffery; Siân Phillips; Ian McNeice; Michael Denison; Freddie Jones
- Edited by: Stuart Taylor
- Music by: Keith Miller
- Release date: 1990
- Running time: 1 hr. 40 min.

Dark River is a 1990 British film starring Tom Bell, Siân Phillips, Kate Buffery, Ian McNeice and Tony Haygarth. The film was an official selection at the 1990 Montreal World Film Festival and the Ghent Film Festival of the same year.

== Plot summary ==
The film is set in a British colony on the banks of a river flowing through the lowlands of Africa. A stranger named Deacon arrives in the tight-knit community, refusing to abide by its self-serving code. He immediately enters into disputes with the locals, including: businessman K.B. Priestley, who uses his authority in the community to disguise his personal weaknesses; his daughter Lydia, who uses the men in the community as rungs in her climb out of provincialism; Yorkie, a sour, manipulative club barman; and widow and cocoa heiress Mrs Blessington, who plays puppet-master from a distance.

Deacon writes and publishes a novel which draws on their weaknesses, which becomes a success back home, causing problems for its author. Before sunrise one morning, a boat sets sail upriver, carrying First Secretary Hugo Shrike and Deacon, who has made a rendezvous with a person he intends to kill.
