= Fish (British TV series) =

BBC drama series of 2000

- Genre: Legal drama
- Created by: Stephen Tredre
- Written by: Stephen Tredre; Matthew Bardsley
- Directed by: Brett Fallis; Claire Winyard
- Starring: Paul McGann; Jemma Redgrave; Mick Ford
- Country of origin: United Kingdom
- Original language: English
- No. of series: 1
- No. of episodes: 6

Production
- Executive producers: Mal Young; Sarah Boote
- Producer: Miriam Segal
- Running time: 50 minutes
- Production companies: BBC; Principle Pictures

Original release
- Network: BBC One
- Release: 2 May – 5 June 2000

Fish is a British television drama series first broadcast on BBC One in 2000. It features Paul McGann as the title character, alongside Jemma Redgrave and Mick Ford. It was created by Stephen Tredre, written by Tredre and Matthew Bardsley, and co-produced by the BBC and Principal Pictures.

== Premise ==
Jonathan "Fish" Vishnevski (McGann) is an employment lawyer who specialises in industrial tribunals. His wife has left him and gone abroad, leaving him to look after their young son, Simon (Jack Stanley). In court, he often comes up against lawyer Joanna Morgan (Redgrave), who becomes his love interest. His friend Trevor (Ford) is an amateur philosopher who owns a mobile burger bar.

Additional characters include Ivan Vishnevski (Philip Voss), Harold Cornice (Stephen Moore), Sarah Cornice (Jill Baker) and Jess Taylor (Daniela Denby-Ashe).

== Creation and production ==
The series was inspired by the brother of producer Miriam Segal and conceived by Stephen Tredre in 1994, who took up screenwriting due to illness. After obtaining funding from Principal Pictures, Segal approached ITV and then the BBC with the programme, who both turned it down. It was then offered to the BBC's regional drama department, BBC Birmingham, and the series was commissioned. After reorganisation within the BBC, the series was announced in 1999 by the corporation's drama head, Mal Young.

The first episode was written by Tredre before his death in 1997, with the rest of the series completed by Matthew Bardsley.

The series was filmed in London and cost £3 million.

Redgrave's marriage to lawyer Tim Owen did not put her off taking the role of lawyer Joanna Morgan, telling Rob Driscoll for the Birmingham Post: "I've been dying to play a lawyer for the longest time, precisely because I know that world quite well now. I'm just worried if people spot mistakes, after all this seemingly reliable research!" Also speaking ahead of the first broadcast, McGann described his character as having "depth" and said of the "intelligent" writing: "It will really engage people. They'll find themselves strangely intrigued. This is the sort of television we should be making, television that makes you think."

== Episode list ==
No.	Title	Directed by	Written by	Original release date
1	"The Sins of the Father"	Brett Fallis	Stephen Tredre	2 May 2000
2	"Uncharted Waters"	Brett Fallis	Matthew Bardsley	9 May 2000
3	"Ever Decreasing Circles"	Brett Fallis	Debbie Jones	16 May 2000
4	"Dancing with the Devil"	Claire Winyard	Matthew Bardsley	23 May 2000
5	"Love's Labour Lost"	Claire Winyard	Matthew Bardsley	30 May 2000
6	"Another Shade of White"	Claire Winyard	Matthew Bardsley	6 June 2000

== Reception ==
In his review for The Herald, David Belcher found the first episode "a bizarre, overly-complex TV hybrid", categorising it as "so-wrong-it's-only-right-to-watch-aghast-and-snicker". Tony Purnell in The Mirror wasn't 'hooked', and Frances Grant in The New Zealand Herald said that "Fish doesn't yet seem to be an interesting enough character to single-handedly carry a series", with the review concluding with a quote from the series: "You lot in suits – you're very bland."
