= Jill Baker =

British actress

- Born: Gillian Mary Baker; 1952 (age 73–74)
- Occupation: Actress
- Years active: 1975–present
- Spouse: Bob Peck (m. 1982; died 1999)
- Children: 3

Jill Baker (born 1952) is a British actress who has worked extensively in theatre and television for 50 years.

== Personal life ==
Baker is a graduate of the Bristol Old Vic Theatre School.

She and actor Bob Peck were married for 17 years, from 1982 until his death, in 1999. They had three children.

== Career ==
She made her debut in the TV movie Savages in 1975 and has worked steadily on television and theatre since then. Her theatre work includes Sufficient Carbohydrate by Denis Potter, Goosepimples by Mike Leigh, and All My Sons, all in the West End, and the premiere of The Secret Rapture in 1988. She has also been working as an actress in British television since 1975. Along with playing a recurring lead character in Rides, Screaming and Fish, she has made cameo appearances in individual episodes of Blore M.P, The Professionals (1980), Only Fools and Horses (1981), Me and My Girl (1984), "Last Bus to Woodstock" (an Inspector Morse mystery) (1988), Tales of Sherwood Forest (1989), Prime Suspect (1995), The Girl (1996) as Anne Thornton, The Broker's Man (1997–98) as Claudette Monro-Foster, The Vanishing Man (1998) as Dr. Jeffries, Perfect Strangers (2001), New Tricks (2003), A Touch of Frost (2004), Secret Smile (2005), Waking the Dead, Holby City (2007), Spooks (2008) and Wallander, Episode 1 in 2008. She has also appeared as Lady de Lesseps in Shakespeare in Love. In 2009 she appeared in the ITV drama Whatever It Takes. In 2011 she appeared in the ITV drama Midsomer Murders "Not in My Back Yard" as Eleanor Swanscombe. In 2014, she appeared in Happy Valley as Helen Gallagher. Baker appeared in Only Fools and Horses in the episode "The Second Time Around", as Del Boy (David Jason)'s ex-fiancée, Pauline Harris.

== Filmography ==
=== Film ===
Year	Title	Role	Notes
1987	Hope and Glory	Faith	
1998	Shakespeare in Love	Lady De Lesseps	
2004	That Time of Year...	Josephine	Short film
2006	Notes on a Scandal	Sheba's Mother	
2011	Salmon Fishing in the Yemen	Betty	
2012	John Carter	Additional Voice	Voice
2012	Tower Block	Violet	
2016	A Lighthouse in Breaking Waves	Alive	Short film
TBA	The Bitter End		Filming

=== Television ===
Year	Title	Role	Notes
1975	Savages	Angela Smith	Television film
1975	Get Some In!	Agnes	Episode: "36-Hour Pass"
1977	The Cedar Tree	Vendeuse	2 episodes
1980	The Gentle Touch	Connie	Episode: "Menaces"
1980	The Professionals	Amanda	Episode: "Hijack"
1981	Only Fools and Horses	Pauline Harris	Episode: "The Second Time Around"
1982	We'll Meet Again	Mavis	Episode: "Up the Smoke"
1982	Arena	Actress in Play	Episode: "Mike Leigh Making Plays"
1983	BBC Television Shakespeare	Lady Macduff	Episode: "Macbeth"
1984	Me and My Girl	Kim Tracy	Episode: "Design for Living"
1984	On the Shelf	Jackie	Television film
1987	Harry's Kingdom	Jilly King	Television film
1988	Inspector Morse	Jennifer Coleby	Episode: "Last Bus to Woodstock"
1988	Boon	Mrs. Hains	Episode: "The Devil You Know"
1989	ScreenPlay	Jilly Taylor	Episode: "Testimony of a Child"
1989	Tales of Sherwood Forest	Sarah	7 episodes
1989	Screen One	Priscilla Blore	Episode: "Blore M.P."
1992	Screaming	Rachael	8 episodes
1992–1993	Rides	Patrice Jenner	12 episodes
1994	In Suspicious Circumstances	Elizabeth Earle	Episode: "Death Scene"
1994	Ellen	Mrs. Thompson (as Gill Baker)	Episode: "The Toast"
1995	Prime Suspect	Maria Henry	Episode: "Prime Suspect: Inner Circles"
1995	Chandler & Co	Edith Cotham	Episode: "No Tomorrow"
1996	The Girl	Anne Thornton	Television film
1998	March in Windy City	Dr. Prudence Cox	Television film
1997–1998	The Broker's Man	Claudette Monro-Foster	8 episodes
1998	The Vanishing Man	Dr. Jeffries	2 episodes
2000	Fish	Sarah Cornice	6 episodes
2001	The Bill	Lisa Sharp	2 episodes
2001	Perfect Strangers	Esther	3 episodes
2003	New Tricks	Gaynor Wringer	Episode: "The Chinese Job"
2003	Real Men	Julie Ferguson	Television film
2003	Jonathan Creek	Donna Henry	Episode: "The Tailor's Dummy"
2003	Canterbury Tales	Mrs. Norman	Episode: "The Pardoner's Tale"
2004	A Touch of Frost	Elizabeth Richford	Episode: "Dancing in the Dark"
2004	Belonging	Cathy	Television film
2004	Rosemary & Thyme	Val Reeves	Episode: "Swords into Ploughshares"
2005	Secret Smile	Marcia Cotton	2 episodes
2007	Waking the Dead	Dr. Caroline Ritter	2 episodes
2007	Sea of Souls	Annie Rubenstein	2 episodes
2007	Heartbeat	Shirley Dekin	Episode: "Where There's Smoke"
2008	Wallander	Anita Carlman	Episode: "Sidetracked"
2008	Spooks	Rachel Beauchamp	Episode: #7.6
2009	Above Suspicion	Mrs Kenworth	Episode: "Part 1"
2009	Whatever It Takes	Estelle	Television film
2011	Midsomer Murders	Eleanor Swanscombe	Episode: "Not in My Back Yard"
2011	Law & Order: UK	Margaret Rumsfield	Episode: "Intent"
2007–2011	Holby City	Nancy Overbeck / Sister John	2 episodes
2013	Doctors	Corinne Gough	Episode: "Heston's Last Testament"
2014–2015	EastEnders	Margot Summerhayes	2 episodes
2014–2016	Happy Valley	Helen Gallagher	7 episodes
2016	To Walk Invisible: The Brontë Sisters	Aunt Branwell	Television film
2015, 2020	Casualty	Rosie Allen / Theresa Ashby	2 episodes
2022	Doc Martin	Professor Judy Phillips	Episode: "Return to Sender"
2023	Wolf	Louise	Episode: "Night Terror"
