= Hetty Wainthropp Investigates =

British television series, 1996–1998

- Genre: Cozy crime
- Created by: David Cook and John Bowen
- Starring: Patricia Routledge; Derek Benfield; Dominic Monaghan; John Graham Davies; Suzanne Maddock; Frank Mills
- Composer: Nigel Hess
- Country of origin: United Kingdom
- Original language: English
- No. of series: 4
- No. of episodes: 28

Production
- Executive producer: Michael Wearing
- Producer: Carol Parks
- Cinematography: John McGlashan
- Editor: Malcolm Banthorpe
- Running time: 104 minutes (Pilot); 75 minutes (S01E01); 50 minutes (S01E02—)
- Production companies: BBC TV Productions, Yorkshire Television (pilot)

Original release
- Network: ITV (Pilot); BBC1 (Series)
- Release: 3 January 1996 – 4 September 1998

Hetty Wainthropp Investigates is a British crime drama television series, starring Patricia Routledge as the title character, Henrietta "Hetty" Wainthropp, that aired for four series between 3 January 1996 and 4 September 1998 on BBC One. The series, spawned from a pilot episode entitled "Missing Persons" aired by ITV in 1990, was co-created by writers David Cook and John Bowen, co-starred Derek Benfield as Hetty's patient husband Robert, and Dominic Monaghan as her assistant and lodger Geoffrey Shawcross. It marked Monaghan's acting debut.

Other co-stars in the series include John Graham Davies as local chief of police DCI Adams; Suzanne Maddock as Janet Fraser, a feisty young auto mechanic; and Frank Mills as Robert's brother Frank. In the United States, episodes have broadcast as part of PBS's anthology series Mystery!. A parody of the series, entitled Wetty Hainthropp Investigates (episode name: "Wetty Hainthropp Looks into It"), aired on 12 March 1999 as part of the Comic Relief telethon, starring Victoria Wood, Julie Walters and Duncan Preston.

== Production ==
Hetty Wainthropp Investigates is based on characters from the novel Missing Persons (1986) by David Cook, who co-wrote the episodes with John Bowen. The incidents in Cook's novel were inspired by his own mother's experiences. Prior to the pilot going into production, Patricia Routledge read the story Missing Persons for BBC Radio 4's A Book At Bedtime in February 1987.

In 1990 ITV broadcast a feature-length pilot, Missing Persons, featuring Tony Melody as Robert Wainthropp and Garry Halliday as Geoffrey Shawcross, but ITV opted not to pursue a series. The storyline of this episode is ignored in the subsequent BBC series, with the first episode establishing Hetty as a detective in her first case and meeting Geoffrey for the first time. The characterisation of Hetty was altered considerably for the series from the pilot. The 'original' Hetty was blonde and far more 'theatrical' in her manner. Additionally, the pilot character lived in considerably better circumstances than the home seen in the series.

The BBC series was filmed primarily in Burnley, Darwen, Blackburn, Rossendale, Bolton, Southport and other locations in Lancashire.

The music for the series was composed by Nigel Hess, the cornet solo was performed by Phillip McCann and in 1997 the title track was awarded the Ivor Novello Award for best television theme.

The BBC series was popular with viewers, but no further episodes were commissioned after 1998. In 2008 Patricia Routledge said in an interview that the cast and crew had been told by the BBC at the end of the fourth series that a fifth series would be commissioned, but it never was. In 2017 Suzanne Maddock shared her memories of making Hetty Wainthropp Investigates in a 45-minute interview for The Bill Podcast, and explained how she felt disappointed for the fans of the series that they did not get to see a proper conclusion to it.

== Synopsis ==
Hetty Wainthropp is a retired working-class woman from Darwen in northwest England, who has a knack for jumping to conclusions and solving crimes of varying bafflement which often are too minor to concern the police. Although on occasion her husband offers assistance, he more often than not tends to the home while Hetty gads about the countryside with young Geoffrey in search of resolution and justice. In many episodes Hetty seeks the help and advice of DCI Adams of the local constabulary.

== Cast ==
- Patricia Routledge as Henrietta "Hetty" Wainthropp
- Derek Benfield as Robert Wainthropp
- Dominic Monaghan as Geoffrey Shawcross
- John Graham Davies as DCI Adams
- Suzanne Maddock as Janet Fraser
- Frank Mills as Frank Wainthropp

== Episodes ==
=== Pilot (1990) ===
No.	Title	Directed by	Written by	Original air date
1	"Missing Persons"	Derek Bennett	David Cook	30 May 1990
During a visit to childhood friend Edith, retired housewife Hetty Wainthropp discovers that Edith’s husband, Frank, has a son by a previous marriage. Hetty decides to turn amateur detective to trace him. When this gives her a taste for detection, Hetty decides to set up a private detective agency.

=== Series 1 (1996) ===
No.	Title	Directed by	Written by	Original air date
1	"The Bearded Lady"	John Glenister	John Bowen & David Cook	3 January 1996
Hetty's part-time job in the Post Office leads to an investigation of pension fraud, which begins with the uncovering of the death of a bag lady. But was it an accident?
2	"Eye Witness"	John Glenister	John Bowen & David Cook	10 January 1996
Hetty and Robert investigate the case of a missing bird watcher.
3	"Fingers"	Robert Tronson	John Bowen & David Cook	17 January 1996
While on holiday with Robert in Italy, Hetty takes on new clients, who claim their son, who lives in the UK, has been kidnapped by the Mafia who have been sending his fingers to them.
4	"Widdershins"	Robert Tronson	John Bowen & David Cook	24 January 1996
Robert receives news that his Uncle Albert, a former footballer and his childhood hero, has been found dead from an apparent suicide. Refusing to believe it, Hetty discovers the village where he lived used to have witches. Is there a connection?
5	"A High Profile"	John Glenister	John Bowen & David Cook	31 January 1996
Hetty helps a distressed mother to find her schizophrenic son who is in need of his medication.
6	"Safe As Houses"	Robert Tronson	John Bowen & David Cook	7 February 1996
An old acquaintance asks Hetty to track down her missing foster daughter who may be responsible for a series of local arson attacks.

=== Series 2 (1996–1997) ===
No.	Title	Directed by	Written by	Original air date
1	"Poison Pen"	Roger Bamford	John Bowen & David Cook	29 November 1996
Basking in a glow of publicity from their last successful job, the agency has more work than it can handle. While Hetty tries to help a stricken village, can Robert and Geoffrey conduct their own case?
2	"Lost Chords"	Robert Tronson	David Cook & John Bowen	6 December 1996
It's the 50th anniversary of the Blainthorp Music Festival and there is fierce competition to be chosen as the Golden Voice. Suddenly the finalists start losing their voices – and Hetty must find out why.
3	"Not all there"	Robert Tronson	David Cook & John Bowen	13 December 1996
The Mayor of Titterslow wants Hetty to find his daughter, but there must be no publicity and no police. Hetty discovers where Susan planned to go, but she hasn't arrived. Why not, and who is with her?
4	"The Astral Plane"	Roger Bamford	John Bowen & David Cook	20 December 1996
DCI Adams approaches Hetty with a case he cannot follow up: a spiritualist appears to be blackmailing her clients. Disguised as a grieving widow, Hetty isn't prepared for what she hears.
5	"A Rose By Any Other Name"	David Giles	Jeremy Paul	3 January 1997
Gillian's family are convinced that Lester Rose wants to marry her for her money. Hetty has one week to find out if his intentions are honourable.
6	"Woman of the Year"	Rob Benfield	John Bowen & David Cook	10 January 1997
Hetty goes undercover as a "battered wife" in a Woman's Aid refuge.

=== Series 3 (1997–1998) ===
No.	Title	Directed by	Written by	Original air date
1	"All Stitched Up"	David Giles	Jeremy Paul	28 November 1997
Hetty joins a quilt making circle in order to find out who is terrorising a housing estate.
2	"Daughter of the Regiment"	David Giles	Brian Finch	5 December 1997
A bride-to-be is being stalked. When her mother seeks Hetty's help, she is totally unprepared for the consequences.
3	"Serving the Community"	Don Leaver	Philip Martin	12 December 1997
Hetty faces danger when she agrees to track down a gang who have attacked local Indian restaurant owners.
4	"Fisticuffs"	Don Leaver	Jeremy Paul	19 December 1997
Hetty seeks compensation for the victim of a road rage incident in which a female driver hit another in the face.
5	"Child's Play"	John Glenister	Brian Finch	2 January 1998
The Wainthropps' nephew has been excluded from school. But has he been wrongly accused?
6	"Pursuit By Proxy"	John Glenister	Peter Gibbs	9 January 1998
Hetty represents a neighbour at a creditors' meeting and her agency is asked to find a missing company director and his money.
7	"A Minor Operation"	Jim Goddard	Philip Martin	16 January 1998
Hetty is in hospital – an unlikely place to find her most urgent case yet.
8	"Helping Hansi"	Jim Goddard	Philip Martin	23 January 1998
Hetty is asked by Hansi, a German pensioner, to help track down his sister whom he last saw during the war.
9	"How Time Flies"	David Giles	Jeremy Paul	30 January 1998
Hetty's trip down memory lane on a steam train is interrupted by an absent-minded clock mender who is being pursued by two small-time crooks.

=== Series 4 (1998) ===
Episode	Title	Written by	Directed by	Original airdate	Viewers (millions)
1	"Something to Treasure"	Philip Martin	David Giles	24 July 1998	5.55
A widow calls on the Wainthropp Detective Agency to investigate the theft of a book written by her late husband.
2	"Family Values"	Brian Finch	David Giles	31 July 1998	6.54
Robert and Geoffrey go undercover when Hetty is asked to investigate the circumstances of a death.
3	"Digging For Dirt"	Peter Gibbs	Mike Vardy	7 August 1998	6.51
Hetty is called in to mediate when a local councillor's mother refuses to leave her flat, which is earmarked for demolition.
4	"Mind Over Muscle"	Peter Gibbs	Robert Tronson	14 August 1998	6.92
Hetty's latest client is her hairdresser whose husband is attacked, seemingly at random, in a gents' toilet.
5	"Blood Relations"	Philip Martin	Robert Tronson	21 August 1998	7.24
A reunion with her long-lost cousin sets Hetty on the trail of smugglers in a quiet Yorkshire fishing village.
6	"For Love Nor Money"	Jeremy Paul	Mike Vardy	4 September 1998	7.44
Robert’s brother Frank comes to stay and brings Hetty the case of a missing Victorian school teacher.

== DVDs ==
All four series have been released on DVD in the United Kingdom and United States by Acorn Media. In Australia, the series was released by Madman Films. In Belgium and the Netherlands, the series was released by Lime-Lights Pictures.

DVD Name	Release date		
DVD Name	Region 1	Region 2	Region 4
Hetty Wainthropp Investigates: Missing Persons	29 March 2005	9 May 2005	—N/a
Hetty Wainthropp Investigates: The Complete First Series	7 September 2004	11 October 2004	31 October 2007
Hetty Wainthropp Investigates: The Complete Second Series	9 August 2005	22 January 2007	9 April 2008
Hetty Wainthropp Investigates: The Complete Third Series	31 January 2006	5 March 2007	9 July 2008
Hetty Wainthropp Investigates: The Complete Fourth Series	27 June 2006	10 September 2007	8 October 2008
Hetty Wainthropp Investigates: The Complete Collection	4 September 2007	7 January 2008	20 October 2009
Hetty Wainthropp Investigates: The Complete Collection - Remastered	—N/a	14 August 2017	—N/a
