= Colin Tarrant =

English actor (1952–2012)

- Born: 14 June 1952; Shirebrook, Derbyshire, England
- Died: 26 January 2012 (aged 59); Bristol, England
- Occupation: Actor
- Years active: 1970s–2012
- Partner: Sabrina Morris
- Children: 2

Colin Tarrant (14 June 1952 – 26 January 2012) was an English actor best known for playing Inspector Andrew Monroe in ITV's The Bill between 1990 and 2002.

== Early life and career ==
Tarrant was born in 1952 in Shirebrook, Derbyshire, and studied for a degree in English and Drama at Exeter University, then at the cutting edge of dramaturgy. He briefly worked as a teacher before taking up acting, first at the Northcott Theatre, Exeter and then with Medium Fair Community Theatre Company, Exeter 1975–77 (a company developed from the university drama department). After leaving Medium Fair he was part of Peter Cheeseman's company at the Victoria Theatre, Stoke-on-Trent. He worked with Foco Novo, Shared Experience, the RSC and the Leicester Phoenix Arts Centre. His first major television role was that of Will Brangwen in the BBC miniseries The Rainbow (1988), playing opposite Imogen Stubbs. A twelve-year run in The Bill followed between 1990 and 2002, after which he made many appearances on other television programmes as well as returning to the theatre.

In June 2005, he played Brian Clough in the Nottingham Playhouse's production of Old Big 'Ead in the Spirit of the Man. The play returned several times to the Nottingham Playhouse and played in other venues across England. He followed this with the role of the vagrant Davies in a Nottingham Playhouse production of Harold Pinter's The Caretaker, his performance described by The Stage as "brilliant – wild-eyed, twitchy, aggressive, over-defensive and ungrateful". He starred as the 'Old Gent' in an adaptation of The Railway Children at the National Railway Museum. In 2009 he starred with Stephanie Turner in Honeymoon Suite at the New Vic in Basford. Tarrant performed in a nationwide tour of Calendar Girls which began in Chichester in January 2010.

Television roles included appearances in Holby City, Heartbeat, Doctors, Midsomer Murders and as Ted Williamson in an episode of Casualty which aired on BBC 1 on 11 December 2010.

Tarrant also taught at secondary schools between acting roles.

== Personal life ==
Tarrant suffered from depression and died on 26 January 2012 at the Bristol Royal Infirmary from self-inflicted stab wounds at his home in Bristol. In April 2012, Tarrant's death was ruled a suicide by Flax Bourton Coroner's Court.
