= Ben Roberts (actor) =

Welsh actor (1950–2021)

- Born: Bennett Roberts; 1 July 1950; Bangor, Gwynedd, Wales
- Died: 7 June 2021 (aged 70)
- Occupation: Actor
- Years active: 1978–2019
- Spouse: Helen Lloyd
- Children: 1

Bennett Roberts (1 July 1950 – 7 June 2021) was a Welsh actor most famous for his portrayal of Chief Inspector Derek Conway in the ITV British television series The Bill.

== Early life ==
Roberts was born in Bangor, Gwynedd on 1 July 1950. He attended Friars School and went on to study at the Webber Douglas Academy of Dramatic Art in London, graduating in 1978.

== Career ==
He was best known for playing Chief Inspector Derek Conway in The Bill between 1987 and 2002.

Other numerous television appearances include The Professionals, Angels, The Queen's Nose, Doctors and Casualty.

He had also been active in films. In 2010, he appeared in the Mike Leigh film, Another Year. In 2011, he played Briggs in Cary Fukunaga's Jane Eyre. In 2014, he played Jean in A Little Chaos directed by Alan Rickman, and then in 2016 appearing in Miss Peregrine's Home for Peculiar Children, directed by Tim Burton. In 2019, he appeared as William, in the Danish biographical film Daniel.

== Personal life ==
Roberts lived in Ilkeston, Derbyshire, with his wife, Helen Lloyd, a former television producer and continuity announcer for Central TV. Roberts had one son.

Roberts died on 7 June 2021, at the age of 70.

== Filmography ==
=== Television ===
- A Woman's Place? (1978) – Mark
- The Professionals (1980) – CI5 Man
- Angels (1980) – Graham
- Doctor Who (1984) – Trooper
- Special Squad (1984)
- The Bretts (1987) – Milkman
- Hard Cases (1988) – Tom Gregory
- The Bill (1988–2002) – Chief Inspector Derek Conway
- Tales of Sherwood Forest (1989) – Malcolm
- The Bill: Target (1996) – Acting Supt. Conway
- Sooty Heights (2000) – Policeman
- The Queen's Nose (2001) – Sir Cedric Barkhouse
- Casualty (2005) – Mike Meller
- Doctors (2010) – Brian Taylor
- Doctors (2012) – Dennis Hirst

=== Film ===
- Fallet - Skandia (TV movie) (2009) – Will Mesdag
- Another Year (2010) – Mourner
- Jane Eyre (2011) – Briggs
- A Little Chaos (2014) – Jean
- Miss Peregrine's Home for Peculiar Children (2016) – 40's First Old Man
- Daniel (2019) – William
