= Andrew Mackintosh =

British actor (born 1960)

- Born: 9 August 1960 (age 64); Pennsylvania, United States
- Occupation: Actor
- Spouse: Kathy Dooley
- Children: 3

Andrew Mackintosh (born 9 August 1960) is an actor best known for his role as DS Alistair Greig, a character he played for nine years in the long-running ITV drama The Bill. He is married to singer Kathy Dooley of the pop group The Dooleys.

Amongst his other television credits include appearing in series 2 episode 1 of Goodness Gracious Me, the TV series, in which he played a character assumed to be DS Greig from The Bill, although his name was never mentioned. At the beginning of the sketch, The Bill's theme was played and he was playing a CID officer.

In 2017, Mackintosh became the fourth star of The Bill to share his memories of working on the series, as well as his life and career in general, for The Bill Podcast.

In 2020, Mackintosh was reunited with eight of his Sun Hill co-stars for a three-part Zoom reunion for The Bill Podcast Patreon Channel.

In 2023, Mackintosh returned to acting, starring in the eight-part fiction podcast Letter from Helvetica, which he also wrote.
