= Jane Wall =

English actress

- Born: 1972 (age 53–54); Lagos, Nigeria
- Occupation: Actor
- Years active: 1994–present

Jane Wall (born 1972) is a British actress born to an English father and Nigerian mother. She is well known for her portrayal of Constable Di Worrell in ITV's The Bill from 1999 to 2002.

Wall has also appeared in Dangerfield, A Touch of Frost, Doctors and Holby City.

In 2014, Wall appeared in LA Theatre Works' production of Racing Demon.

== Filmography ==
Film performances
Year	Title	Role	Notes
1995	Bliss	WPC	TV movie
2004	Cloud Cuckoo Land	Jasmine	
2005	A Year and a Day	Kathie	
2010	Beneath the Blue	Lab Technician	
2010	Killing Boyfriends	Joni	Short film

Television performances
Year	Title	Role	Notes
1994	Little Napoleons	Shawna	Episode: "The Big Interview"
1994–1995	A Touch of Frost	Tonia Reece / Baker's Girlfriend	Episodes: "A Minority of One", "Dead Male One"
1995	Degrees of Error	Cordell Hospital Nurse	
1996	Dangerfield	Debbie Mason	Episode: "Scars"
1997	All Quiet on the Preston Front	Nurse Pauline	Episode: "Polson's Mess"
1997	The Bill	Winsome Smith	Episode: "Heartbreak Hotel"
1999–2002	The Bill	PC Di Worrell	117 episodes
2003	Doctors	Alison White	Episode: "Cave Man"
2004	Holby City	Jenny Hallow	Episode: "When Lightning Strikes Twice"
2007	Ghost Whisperer	Karen the Nanny	Episode: "The Gathering"
2011–2012	Live! Sex! Girls!: The Sketch Show	Whore / Joni	4 episodes
2019	The OA	—N/a	Line producer Episode: "Overview"
2019	Grey's Anatomy	Frances Pinfield	Episodes: "Jump Into the Fog", "Drawn to the Blood"

Audio performances
Year	Title	Role	Notes
2020	The Left Right Game	Mom	Podcast series 5 episodes
