= Suzanne Maddock =

English actress (born 1976)

- Born: 13 February 1976 (age 50); New Brighton, Wirral, England,
- Occupations: Actress; singer; voice actress
- Website: https://suzannemaddock.com/

Suzanne Maddock (born 13 February 1976) is an English actress, singer and voice actress. Maddock has been an industry professional since 1994, working in both TV and Film. She appeared in the ITV police procedural drama The Bill as PC Cass Rickman from 1999 to 2002. Her character was killed off in the highly rated Sun Hill Serial Killer storyline.

Maddock played Janet Frazer, a central character in later episodes of Hetty Wainthropp Investigates, starring opposite Dominic Monaghan, for 10 episodes between 1997 and 1998. She also guest starred in Casualty, Silent Witness, and appeared in the films Land and Freedom and Stella Does Tricks.
