= The Don Beech Scandal =

Storyline in the British television series "The Bill"

The Don Beech Scandal was a major storyline in the police procedural British television series The Bill written to facilitate Billy Murray's exit from the show. It led to a spin off series titled Beech is Back.
