= Jeff Stewart (actor) =

British actor (born 1955)

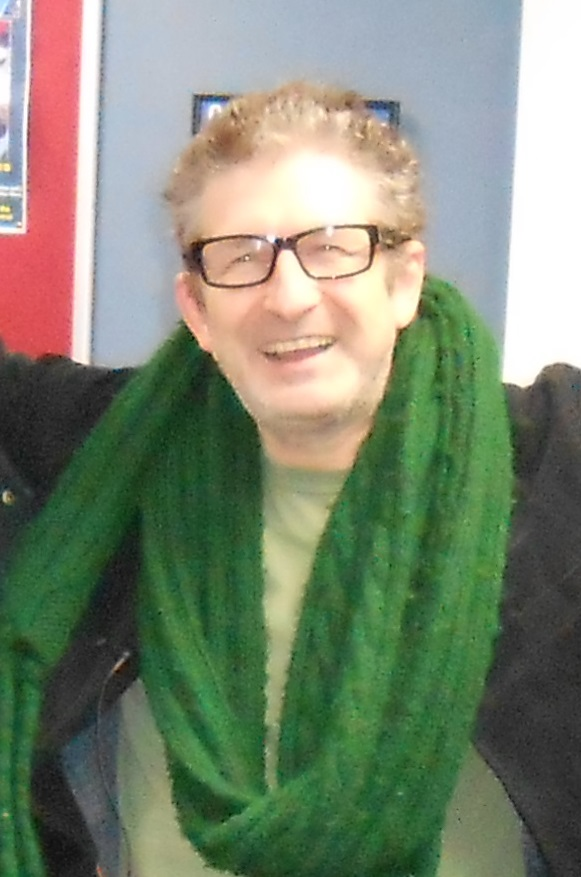
- Stewart on the set of The Bill
- Born: Jeffrey Stewart; 28 October 1955 (age 70); Aberdeen, Scotland
- Occupation: Actor
- Years active: 1964–present

Jeffrey Stewart (born 28 October 1955) is a British actor. He is best known for playing PC Reg Hollis on the ITV drama series The Bill from 1984 to 2008.

== Early life ==
Stewart was born in Aberdeen. He and his family moved to Southampton, Hampshire, when he was three months old. His father worked in shipyards and then for Fawley Refinery.

== Career ==
Stewart has played numerous roles in television series, including Harry Fellows in Crossroads in 1981 and Dukkha in the 1982 Doctor Who story Kinda. He played a police constable in Hi-de-Hi! in 1983, the same year that "Woodentop" (the pilot episode of The Bill) aired. His character on The Bill, Reg Hollis, is his best known role to date. Reg is mentioned but not seen in "Woodentop", so Stewart's first appearance in the series was in the first regular episode, "Funny Ol' Business - Cops & Robbers". By March 2007, Stewart was the last member of the cast remaining from that first episode.

In 2001, Stewart appeared on Lily Savage's Blankety Blank. In 2009, Stewart appeared in the music video for "Black and Blue" by Miike Snow. The video starred him as a reclusive musician with a penchant for creating animatronic performers in his dingy apartment. In 2011, he portrayed a German-Russian man in a Soviet prison in Under Jakob's Ladder. He won a best actor award at the 2011 Manhattan Film Festival for the role. He is often confused with the storyboard artist who also voices characters such as Mr. Tickle in The Mr. Men Show.

== Personal life ==
On 8 January 2008, Stewart cut his wrists after being told that his contract for The Bill would not be renewed. He survived the suicide attempt after calling for help and being taken to hospital by an ambulance. He later said of the incident: "I love being an actor. My work as an actor is very important to me – it's my life, and the thought of this suddenly changing had an extremely serious effect on me."

Stewart is fond of the Hotel Chelsea in New York City, having stayed there on a number of occasions. He is friends with a number of the building's permanent residents. He was staying at the Chelsea in 2011 when the hotel changed ownership and closed to transient guests, due to renovation plans. He initially refused to leave, even calling in the police to assist him, but was persuaded by hotel staff to leave.

On 23 July 2025, Stewart assisted Hampshire police officers arresting a suspected shoplifter. In bodycam footage, Stewart was thanked by the officers and subsequently identified himself and his career on The Bill.

== Filmography ==
=== Film ===
Year	Title	Role	Notes
1981	The Nightmare Man	Drummond	Television film
1996	The Bill: Target	PC Reg Hollis	Television film
2004	The Bill Uncovered: Des and Reg	PC Reg Hollis	Television film
2004	The Bill @ 21	PC Reg Hollis	Television film
2006	A Dogges Tale	Man	Short film
2008	Phlegm Noir	Man 1	Short film
2009	Alice & the Bear	Maître d'	Short film
2009	Dead Man Running	Tiffany's Client	
2010	Tomorrow	The Chef	Short film
2011	Under Jakob's Ladder	Jakob	Manhattan Film Festival Award for Best Actor
2011	Blood on the Border	Agent Martinez	
2011	Lords of Magic	Reverend Ayton	
2011	Billy		
2011	1066	Earl Siward	
2012	Hot Wings	Bobby	
2012	Lake Placid: The Final Chapter	Deputy Nermal	Television film
2013	Grey Matter	Richard	Short film
2013	Hot Wings	Bobby Welsh	
2013	Rubber	Tommy	Short film
2013	How to Become a Criminal Mastermind	Freddie's Boss	
2013	Supremo	Supremo	Short film
2013	Blueprint	Albert	Short film
2013	Re-Roll	Shop Owner	Short film
2014	Piano and Soul	Terry	Short film
2014	The Hooligan Factory	Inspector Harris	
2014	Will You Kill Me Now?	Marcus	Short film
2016	Mob Handed	The Ex Husband	
2016	In the Grass	Wallace	Short film
2016	Longtails	Robbie	
2017	Carlos Gustavo	Defence Minister	
2017	Pastoral	Kevin	Short film
2018	On the Run	Alan	
2019	Beyond Fury	Frankie	
2019	Lexi	Frank	Short film
2019	A Date with Shillelagh	Head bodyguard	
2022	The Road Dance	Skipper	

=== Television ===
Year	Title	Role	Notes
1981	Crossroads	Harry Fellows	Episode: "26 May 1981"
1982	Doctor Who	Dukkha	Serial: Kinda
1983	Reilly: Ace of Spies	Jenkins	Episode: "Endgame"
1983	Angels	Zac	Episode: "Episode #9.20"
1983	Hi-de-Hi!	Police Constable	Episode: "Save Our Heritage"
1984	Minder	Mick	Episode: "The Car Lot Baggers"
1984–2008	The Bill	PC Reg Hollis	872 episodes
1985	Lytton's Diary	Boxer	Episode: "Come Uppance"
1988	Help!	Tinsnip Eddie	Episode: "The Milk of Human Kindness"
2004	Harry Hill's TV Burp	PC Reg Hollis	Episode: "#3.1"
2007	The Dame Edna Treatment	PC Reg Hollis	Episode: "#1.6"
2010	Bloody Foreigners	Belland	Episode: "Great Fire of London"

=== Music videos ===
Year	Artist	Title	Role
1989	Sam Brown	"Can I Get a Witness"	Defendant
2009	Miike Snow	"Black and Blue"	Reclusive Musician

== Awards ==
Year	Work	Award	Category	Result
2011	Under Jakob's Ladder	Manhattan Film Festival Award	Best Actor	Won
