= Manhattan Film Festival =

Annual film festival in the US

The Manhattan Film Festival (MFF) is an annual film festival that was founded in 2006 by filmmakers Philip J. Nelson and Jose Ruiz Jr.

== Notable films and awards ==
- In 2011, the festival screened White Irish Drinkers, a film written and directed by John Gray, creator of the CBS series Ghost Whisperer.
- In 2011, Jeff Stewart won Best Actor for his role in Under Jakob's Ladder. Stewart is best known in the United Kingdom for his role as Reg Hollis in the ITV series The Bill.
- In 2013, Yuck! A 4th Grader's Documentary About School Lunch was screened at the festival: a 20-minute documentary by 11-year-old Zachary Maxwell, an elementary school student in Little Italy, Manhattan, who used a hidden camera to document the school lunches his school served, which often did not resemble those listed on the Department of Education's online menus.
