= Chris Bouchard =

British film producer and director

- Education: University of York
- Occupations: Film producer, film director, screenwriter
- Years active: 2009–present

Chris Bouchard is a British film producer and director of The Hunt for Gollum, an independent Lord of the Rings fan film. The budget was kept to £3,000 using crowd-sourced visual effects. The film was released on streaming platforms in May 2009. In its first week it was the fourth most watched film in the US, after X-Men Origins: Wolverine, Star Trek, and "a romantic comedy starring Matthew McConaughey." As of May 2024, it had been watched by 13 million people.

Bouchard went on to direct feature-length crime drama Hackney’s Finest in 2014, which was produced by London film studio Framestore. In 2018 he co-directed The Little Mermaid, which was released on Netflix. The film starred Shirley MacLaine, Poppy Drayton, William Moseley and Loreto Peralta.

== Awards and honours ==
Best Fiction Produced for the Web for The Hunt for Gollum at the 2009 Cinéma Tous Ecrans festival.
