= The Bill series 18 =

The Bill
- Series 18
- No. of episodes: 86

Release
- Original network: ITV
- Original release: 3 January – 31 December 2002

Series chronology
- ← Previous; Series 17 Next → Series 19

Series 18 of British television drama The Bill consists of 86 episodes, broadcast between 3 January and 31 December 2002. This series marked a massive change for the show, after it received a new executive producer, Paul Marquess.

In 2024, Marquess was interviewed about this in a three-part The Bill Podcast interview by Natalie Roles, who played DS Debbie McAllister (2000–2004), where he reveals a website was created urging for his death in response to the changes he made to the series.

On 14 August 2013, The Bill Series 18 Parts 1 and 2, and The Bill Series 18 Parts 3 and 4 DVD sets were released in Australia.

== Format changes and stroylines ==
Series 18 became the first series to be broadcast in serial format, and generally, only one episode was broadcast per week. The style of the programme also noticeably changes, becoming less police procedural and more "soap opera". This meant that the personal lives of characters were regularly explored for the first time, meaning several characters had family members or partners introduced, casting that rarely happened prior to the Marquess era.

The show also dropped on-screen titles for the first time in the show's history, the last of which being the episode "Quinnan – Part 6". That six-part plot led to the departure of long serving character, PC Dave Quinnan, as actor Andrew Paul exited the series after 12 years. Unlike Paul, who left voluntarily, many of the early departures were enforced as Marquess dismissed a total of eight characters to make way for a major revamp of the cast as part of the move to a soap-opera style series. The longest serving dismissals were that of Andrew Monroe and Derek Conway, with both Colin Tarrant and Ben Roberts sacked after 12 and 14 years on the show, respectively. Their departure came as part of the events around the second station fire, producers following the same format as the 1990 fire by staging a fire to account for a set redevelopment. The events of the fire, which killed six cast members, were preceded by the murder of Conway in a petrol bomb attack. This led to the second major cast change on the series in as many years, following the Don Beech fiasco that saw CID disbanded in 2000. While the decision to remove a large number of long-term characters was controversial amongst die-hard fans, the dramatic scenes from the fire and its related episodes saw a rise in viewership after it dropped prior to Marquess's introduction. The series also made history by airing its first on-screen gay kiss, and while it led to some 170 complaints, they were all dismissed by the Independent Television Committee, who deemed the scene was not "sexually explicit".

In addition to the station fire, two other characters were killed off in major storylines that spanned a majority of the series; Superintendent Tom Chandler's past was explored in a six-month plot that led to his downfall and suicide, while PC Cass Rickman was murdered by a serial killer in a plot that lasted seven months, which did not conclude until the first episodes of the following series. In addition to SC Terry Knowles getting killed in the first episode of the series, part of a plot continued from series 17, the show had the most character deaths in a single series during the show's 27-year run with ten. At that point, it was more than the total number of characters killed off in the series' history. Between the pilot in 1983 and 2001, just nine characters were killed off.

== Cast changes ==
=== Arrivals ===
- PC Cathy Bradford ("Set in Stone"–)
- DC Eva Sharpe ("At the Deep End"–)
- PC Gary Best ("Vigilante"–)
- DC Ken Drummond ("Ruffled Feathers"–)
- Insp Gina Gold ("Ruffled Feathers"–)
- PC Luke Ashton – returning character ("Prove Your Worth"–)
- TDC Brandon Kane ("Prove Your Worth"–)
- PC Kerry Young ("Too Close to the Window"–)
- DS Phil Hunter ("First Day Collar"–)
- FDO Roberta Cryer ("Loggerheads"–)
- DS Samantha Nixon ("Tactful Approach"–)
- PC Gemma Osbourne ("Game Over"–)
- Supt Adam Okaro ("Lock and Load – Part 2" –)
- PC Ruby Buxton ('"First Day Blues"–)

=== Departures ===
- SC Terry Knowles – Stabbed to death during a traffic stop
- PC Dave Quinnan – transfers to SO10 after PC Polly Page rejects his marriage proposal
- Ch. Insp Derek Conway – Killed in petrol bomb attack by Jeff Simpson
- DS Vik Singh – Resigns and faces the consequences for assaulting Jeff Simpson
- Insp Andrew Monroe – Killed in station fire
- PC Ben Hayward – Killed in station fire
- PC Di Worrell – Killed in station fire
- DC Paul Riley – Killed in station fire
- DC Kate Spears – Dies in hospital following station fire
- PC Polly Page – Sent on long-term leave after a suicide attempt (temporary departure)
- PC Sam Harker – Dies in hospital following station fire
- DI Alex Cullen – Transfers to MIT
- Supt Tom Chandler – Commits suicide before being arrested for rape
- PC Cass Rickman – Murdered by the Sun Hill serial killer, Pat Kitson

== Episodes ==
| No. | Title | Episode notes | Directed by | Written by | Original air date |
|---|---|---|---|---|---|
| 1–3 | "Special Constable – Part 2" | Final appearance of Special Constable Terry Knowles; Irene Sutcliffe, James Marcus and Francis Magee guest star | Christopher Lovett; Ged Maguire | Leonard Collin | 3 January 2002; 10 January 2002; 17 January 2002 |
Part 4 – Loaded: Taviner and Hollis head to Southend to rescue Hollis's relationship with his girlfriend Helen. Gilmore, working overdrive to enforce rules, to the disdain of the PCs, doesn't believe the story Taviner concocted about a mechanical issue with the Area Car, and spends his shift going around Met mechanics to find them. Meanwhile, Klein and Knowles hunt for a petty thief who stole a war hero's watch from his widow. After catching the criminal, Derek Daly, Knowles spots an attractive blonde in a car and persuades Nick to pull her over when she jumps a red light. Knowles tries to get her phone number in lieu of a ticket, a trick he learned from his hero Taviner, only to be subjected to a shocking attack. Part 5 – Not to Praise Him: Following the death of Knowles, the Sun Hill team attend his funeral. Gilmore upsets the family of Knowles when he mentions the deceased copper's habit of chatting up female colleagues. Chandler tries to comfort the Knowles family, but Terry's sister Tina blocks their efforts. Klein, still reeling after Terry's death, meets his widow and son to convince her to front a TV appeal to nail Terry's killer. Meadows and Singh liaise with the producers of a reconstruction, but Meadows is angry when the director comments about Knowles flirting with the murderer before his death. As the drink flows at Terry's wake, the tensions rise between arch enemies Gilmore and Taviner, resulting in a full blown punch up between the pair. Part 6– Do Not Pass Go: Despite the discovery of the car used in the murder of Knowles, progress on the case is slow when the registered owner is identified as a drug dealer who turns up dead when his house is raided. Trawling through statements after the TV appeal, Glaze notices the name Kathy Milligan more than once, but uniform are determined to track her down as MIT keep them out of the investigation. Taviner's frustrations sees him track down witness Derek Daly, who reveals information relating to the manager of a local nightclub, Arthur Shanks. When Shanks also points uniform in the direction of Milligan, Klein goes undercover to bring her to justice. Suspicions are raised when Shanks vanishes ahead of the raid on his club; could he be involved? These three episodes make up the second half of the 6-part Special Constable plot that began at the end of series 17.
| 4 | "Juliet" | Anna Keaveney and Jackie Clune guest star | Michael Simpson | Tom Needham | 24 January 2002 |
Dave and Polly search for Shauna Russell, a young woman with Down's syndrome, who has been reported missing by her mother Annie and sister Natalie. They finally find her in an underground car park, but are concerned by her dishevelled state. Despite protests from Annie, her daughter is examined by FME Sue Marton; during the examination, Shauna complains of feeling sick, and she reveals that she is pregnant during questioning. A pregnancy test confirms this and the FME tells Cullen that Shauna is probably three or four months gone, but the FME is unsure how much of her condition she actually understands. However, it cannot be determined whether she consented during the unborn child's conception.
| 5 | "Set in Stone" | First appearance of PC Cathy Bradford; Sara Stockbridge and Kim Taylforth guest star | Ron Bain | Candy Denman | 31 January 2002 |
New PC Cathy Bradford makes an immediate impression after overpowering a thug who escapes Gilmore's clutches in custody. Bradford becomes the centre of attention as Stamp vies for her affections, leading to a series of bets and wise cracking from the relief. Paired on the beat with Hollis, he and Bradford investigate a series of thefts from homes. Meanwhile, Quinnan is seconded to investigate a series of vandalism cases that involve a local daycentre, and Bradford immediately derails Quinnan's progress when she and Hollis interrogate one of the girls who attend the centre. Quinnan gets even when he finds out the culprit is someone neither he or Bradford suspected.
| 6–7 | "Quinnan Part 1–2" | Aired as 90-minute episode, separated into two on DVD release, episode titles stop appearing on screen; Sara Stockbridge, Michael Attwell and Andrew Pleavin guest star | Ron Bain and Roberto Bangura | Phil Ford and Len Collin | 7 February 2002 |
Part 1: Bradford starts an operation at her local gym when the owner, Barry Hunt, reports a series of thefts. Bradford enlists the help of Carver, who uncovers a link to possible steroid use. Bradford also befriends Hunt's daughter Marti to gain information, but discovers her new informant may be more involved than she's letting on. Meanwhile, Quinnan contemplates asking out Daycare Centre manager, Liz Terry. Stamp and Page are wary, and discover she has history for prostitution, but this drives a wedge between Quinnan and his old friends. Part 2: Boyden attends the scene of an RTA involving an HGV and discovers fridge/freezers with holes in bottom. Stamp and Quinnan come across a group of men wandering away from the crash; however, only one is arrested. Upon his arrival to custody, he asks to speak to Conway, revealing he is an immigration officer from France and he was on board the crashed truck with a group of immigrants. McAllister links the case to the body of an unidentified man pulled from the river. Quinnan makes up with Stamp after revealing his divorce from Jenny has been finalised, and after deciding against a relationship with Liz Terry, gets a chance to change his life in a better way when he is offered a major undercover operation; with Quinnan asked to pose as a hotel owner with McAllister, he asks for Page, but when she turns the offer down, can Quinnan talk her round? Stamp is also asked to go undercover as an HGV driver in the same operation.
| 8 | "Quinnan – Part 3" | Velibor Topic guest stars | Michael Cocker | Patrick Melanaphy | 14 February 2002 |
Page and Quinnan pose as a married couple running a hotel, while Carver and Hollis, and immigration agent Petrit, pose as their employees. Stamp continues his undercover role as an HGV driver for the firm bringing in the illegals, while Webb, Lennox and McAllister maintain surveillance on the hotel. The hotel is busy preparing for its opening night, and when the temporary staff arrive, Quinnan seizes the opportunity to attract Berisha's attention by ringing the agency and complaining about them. Later, Stamp makes a delivery to the hotel – four refugees who are immediately set to work. He then picks up his boss Kerns and drives him to a lorry park, where he finds twenty scared refugees and a decomposing body.
| 9 | "Quinnan – Part 4" | Norman Lovett and Velibor Topic guest star | Ian White | Maxwell Young | 14 February 2002 |
The operation appears to be in jeopardy again when Petrit declares that he is going in search of his missing sister. Following a lead from a girl at a café, he and Carver visit a pool hall, but have no joy with the doorman. Page meets up with Cullen to give him an update, and tells him that she is convinced that they are being set up for extortion by Berisha. Her suspicions are later confirmed when Berisha presents Quinnan with a bill for excess staff. Initially, he refuses to pay, until Berisha starts to strangle him, watched by a helpless Webb and Lennox. A determined Petrit plans to return as a punter to the pool hall where his sister may be, which is identified as a brothel.
| 10 | "Quinnan – Part 5" | Velibor Topic guest stars | Ian White | Len Collin | 20 February 2002 |
Accompanied by Hollis, Petrit manages to locate his sister Nicola, who has been working as a prostitute for Berisha. Her colleagues at the brothel rumble them when Petrit refuses to leave his sister, forcing Hollis to blow his cover and call in his colleagues to raid the place. As Quinnan and Page try to save the operation, they find their old passion reviving as they settle into their roles as a husband and wife. Stamp is furious to discover CID have a camera in Quinnan and Page's bedroom, but his shock is compounded by seeing them in a passionate clinch. Quinnan receives a life changing offer, and he stuns Page with a massive offer.
| 11 | "Quinnan – Part 6" | Final appearance of PC Dave Quinnan; Velibor Topic guest stars | Michael Simpson | Len Collin | 27 February 2002 |
Page reels following her proposal from Quinnan, but is left torn by his threats to accept his transfer offer to SO10 if she turns him down. As immigration wrap up the case, Berisha shows up armed and holds Quinnan, Page, Stamp, Carver and Hollis hostage, leaving Conway tasked with negotiating. However, the biggest moment of the day comes after the rescue when Petrit discovers his sister is due to be deported, causing him to take drastic action. Meanwhile, Page turns Quinnan down and immediately regrets it, but Quinnan leaves her heartbroken when she tries to change her mind.
| 12 | "Episode 001" "Down A Blind Alley" | First episode in serial format, title sequence updated to show cast changes; Trevor Byfield and Eamon Boland guest star | Daniela Neumann | Steve Handley | 28 February 2002 |
Taviner and Hollis investigate a disturbance at a local lap-dancing club, Polestar, in which a waitress has been assaulted. The case soon escalates when a flat belonging to another member of Polestar's staff is burgled. Chandler orders an undercover operation to try to catch those responsible. Bradford soon discovers that the manager of the club has a sideline in prostitution, and goes undercover in an attempt to trap him into incriminating himself. When Bradford's new roommate is badly beaten outside a local hotel, she goes all out to nail the culprit. Meanwhile, Stamp and Page investigate complaints of credit card fraud in the area, with a devastated Page finding herself taking her eye off the ball following her breakup with Quinnan.
| 13 | "Episode 002" "Loose Cannon" | First appearance of Jeff Simpson; Carol Harrison and Bryan Murray guest star | Daniela Neumann | Eric Deacon | 7 March 2002 |
Webb and Spears pursue a stolen car across the Jasmine Allen Estate and discover guns under the seat. The car is traced to recently released convict, Michael Bowker. When questioned, Bowker claims to have no knowledge of the weapons. Webb photographs Bowker handing over large wads of cash to a blonde woman, whom Meadows recognises as Angie Weller, wife of imprisoned super-grass Jimmy Weller. When Bowker turns up dead, Meadows discovers a plan to spring Jimmy Weller from prison and murder him at his mother's funeral. Meanwhile, Singh takes the law into his own hands after being subjected to a disgusting tirade by a pair of racists.
| 14 | "Episode 003" "Face the Music" | Paul Raffield and Bryan Murray guest star | Jamie Nuttgens | Chris McWatters | 14 March 2002 |
Carver and Ackland investigate a series of burglaries, where all of the homeowners have booked holidays with a particular travel agent. Carver is aware of the criminal history of one of the employees, and immediately suspects that he may be responsible. When the robberies are linked to the man's girlfriend, Carver goes undercover at a dog kennel in an attempt to set a trap for the thief, but his lack of knowledge sees his cover blown. Singh is sent to investigate his own attack on Jeff Simpson with an unhappy Glaze, who witnessed the attack, but threats of violent retaliation result in a full blown race riot. Meanwhile, Webb tries to work out who Chandler's fancy woman is, unaware that it is his best friend Spears.
| 15 | "Episode 004" "Thin Ice" | Anthony May and Bryan Murray guest star | Jamie Nuttgens | Julian Spilsbury | 21 March 2002 |
Stamp and Rickman pursue a stolen Porsche to a lock-up, where they find a number of false plates being applied to stolen high-end vehicles. Stamp and Rickman are suspicious when one of the victims, an accountant, has not reported his car missing. When Rickman spots a duo hanging around outside his office, she recognises them as visitors to the lock-up. A scam is uncovered that links suspect and victim, but when the suspects discover he has been skimming money off their account for years, they set out to pay him a visit. During the raid, Stamp nearly falls victim to a petrol bomb intended for Singh, while Webb trails an unsuspecting McAllister in his quest for Chandler's secret girlfriend.
| 16 | "Episode 005" "Afternoon Rendezvous" | Final appearance of Ch Insp Derek Conway; Maria McErlane and Bryan Murray guest star | Mike Adams | Marc Pye | 28 March 2002 |
Bradford and Taviner investigate when an ice cream van is held to ransom by a gunman who has a penchant for Clint Eastwood quotes. The raid is soon linked to a series of thefts from jewellers and the theft of a suit from a tailors attended by Hollis and Stamp, thanks to a mother bringing her teenage daughter in to put her on the straight and narrow. Taviner discovers that a ring of three students from Canley Tech are responsible for the robberies, but when they are released, they steal the keys to his brand new sports car from the front desk, taking it on a joyride. Hollis tries to work out a series of cryptic clues as to where they will strike next. Chandler opts out of a community meeting to have a rendezvous with Spears, so he sends Conway in his place. While he manages to calm Asian community leaders over the Neo-Nazi march, the night ends in tragedy.
| 17 | "Episode 006" "Rally the Troops" | Final appearance of DS Vik Singh; Bryan Murray guest stars | Mike Adams | Phillip Gladwin | 4 April 2002 |
Chaos ensues in custody as the relief try to track down every know player in the race war, with Chandler attempting to rally the troops as they seek to bring Conway's killer to justice. Sandra Conway attends the station and blasts Chandler when he suggests a police funeral, but seeks solace in the arms of Ackland. Webb, Spears and Taviner are told by both parties of the race war that a supremacist was assaulted by a police officer, with Azim Khan commenting that the assailants were two black officers, so they grill Glaze and Singh. With both failing to crack under pressure, Webb breaks the news to Meadows. Singh goes off to grill prime suspect Jeff Simpson, but when his assault of Simpson comes to light, the relief realise they can't nail the man they are certain is the killer.
| 18 | "Episode 007" "A Show of Generosity" | Guy Henry and Bryan Murray guest star | Steve Finn | Katherine Smith | 11 April 2002 |
Taviner and Hollis deal with a number of disturbances involving two local youths, but aren't lucky enough to catch either of them. Monroe organises a fund for Conway, and while Chandler makes a very charitable donation, Taviner is forced to write an IOU. With no way of contributing to the pot, Taviner believes he has hit the big time when he catches up with one of the youths and confiscates £200 from him. Managing to rescue his reputation amongst the relief, he is soon left in deep trouble as unbeknownst to him, the money is fake. Stamp and Page find a number of petrol bombs and fireworks near Simpson's bookshop, but it is Azim Khan who finds himself being arrested for stealing petrol. Meanwhile, a devastated Ackland attends Conway's funeral with Carver.
| 19 | "Episode 008" "Golden Opportunity" | Final appearances of Insp Andrew Monroe, PCs Ben Hayward and Di Worrell, and DCs Paul Riley and Kate Spears; Bryan Murray guest stars | Steve Finn | Declan Croghan | 16 April 2002 |
With the Neo-Nazi march through the Jasmine Allen Estate cancelled, Chandler and Monroe put the relief out on the estate to calm the tensions. Gilmore struggles to maintain a van full of unhappy officers, especially when he orders them to stay put after briefly coming under attack. Carver and Ackland encounter a young boy who has found riot gear, although Glaze discovers the boy has been the runner for a series of thefts from charity collection boxes. When an attack on an Asian owned warehouse leads to a raid, Chandler preemptively stands uniform down, despite protests from the relief. Meanwhile, Taviner frets about the false money in the collection fund, while Page cracks as her depression spirals, leading both to take desperate action.
| 20 | "Episode 009" "No Signs of Life" | Departure of PC Polly Page; Jessica Fox, Barrie Gosney and Bryan Murray guest star | Declan O'Dwyer | Katherine Smith | 17 April 2002 |
Chandler announces the deaths of Monroe, Worrell, Hayward and Riley following the firebombing of the station. A desperate Taviner stands by a critically injured Harker's bed as he fears his role in the bombing being exposed. Page recovers after being found in the fire, but she reveals to Stamp that she tried to take an overdose, having found her depression too much to handle. When Stamp confronts a distraught Ackland, who spends the day seeing the family of the deceased officers, she demands Page go on long-term leave to seek help. Webb is determined to see Spears as she lies critically injured in hospital, but with family the only visitors allowed, he is left devastated when she succumbs to her injuries without him there. His sadness turns to anger and he unleashes fury on Chandler at a press conference. Meanwhile, Glaze struggles to comprehend recent events, telling Lennox he thinks Simpson is involved, feeling guilty at the thought that Singh's attack could've led to the death of Conway and those in the station attack.
| 21 | "Episode 010" "A Peg Or Two" | Final appearance of PC Sam Harker; first appearances of Det Supt Susan Devlin and DI Daniel Hayes; Sgt Matt Boyden becomes A/Insp; Sylvester McCoy guest stars | Declan O'Dwyer | Tom Needham | 18 April 2002 |
Chandler hastily makes Boyden Acting Inspector in the aftermath of the station blaze, immediately taking Gilmore's idea to hold a minute's silence for the victims to boost his credibility within the relief. Taviner considers killing Harker to keep him quiet, but as he decides against it and prepares to confess to Hollis, Harker succumbs to his injuries. Elsewhere, McAllister tries to find "evidence" to ensnare elusive safecracker Peter Grace, whose case file was lost in the fire. Gilmore and Carver uncover a stolen jewelry scam, after a bizarre call about a man digging holes in a two gardens, while Lennox and Glaze are reprimanded by Meadows for their pursuit of Simpson. Webb tells Meadows that Conway was only killed because Chandler ducked out of the community meeting, and the pair form an alliance to bring their boss down.
| 22 | "Episode 011" "Suspects" | Bryan Murray and Chris Vance guest star | Ken Grieve | Henrietta Hardy | 25 April 2002 |
Taviner starts to panic when he returns to Sun Hill as Detective Superintendent Devlin and DI Hayes arrive from MIT to investigate the firebombing and Conway's murder. The relief are disgusted at Devlin's suggestion that the fire could be an inside job, with Ackland and Hollis putting their foot in it during questioning. As the relief try to get back to normal, Stamp tries to catch a teenager who stole flowers from outside the station, while McAllister tries to track down an internet fraudster. McAllister is knocked back by Meadows as she tries to get on a computer training course, so she flirts with Chandler to get on board through him. Meanwhile, Glaze continues with his vendetta against Jeff Simpson, but it's decorator Harry Fullerton who becomes prime suspect for Devlin and Hayes.
| 23 | "Episode 012" "At The Deep End" | First appearance of DC Eva Sharpe; guest appearances of ex-Ch Supt Charles Brownlow and ex-Sgt Bob Cryer; Jessica Fox and Bryan Murray guest star | Ken Grieve | Julie White | 2 May 2002 |
A tough day arrives for the Sun Hill team as they prepare for the funerals of their seven murdered colleagues. Charles Brownlow and Bob Cryer return to attend, and Meadows warns Webb not to show Chandler up at the funeral, but Chandler's comments about Spears cause Webb to storm out in anger. Hayes and Devlin's reputation with the relief takes a further nosedive when they try to question Taviner at the funeral, who is left feeling guilty after being asked to take Josh Worrell for a run in the Area Car, and his guilt leads him to inadvertadly lash out at the young boy. The memorial is an uncomfortable affair with MIT hanging around, but the mood is lifted as Hayes and Devlin make their first arrest. Meanwhile, new DC Eva Sharpe is assigned to watch a drug dealer, only to be double crossed by an informant who allowed the dealer to escape without her seeing. Gilmore is left disappointed when Boyden stops him attending the funerals to supervise the relief, while McAllister grows closer to Chandler.
| 24 | "Episode 013" "Needle in a Haystack" | Title sequence updated to show cast changes, first episode with stab vests as standard issue for PCs; Neil Maskell and Bryan Murray guest star | Graeme Harper | Nick Saltrese | 9 May 2002 |
Glaze and Sharpe are tasked with investigating an assault on a cab driver. Bradford and Carver attend a second; however, the victim and witness fail to pick out the prime suspect in an identity parade. Taviner tries to convince Harry Fullerton to retract his confession to the station firebombing, when he escorts him to Barton Street with MIT, but the move backfires on a guilty Taviner. Meanwhile, Chandler is delighted when the Borough Commander tells him the redeveloped Sun Hill will get a Community Safety Unit, piquing Ackland's interest. Both struggle with their personal lives; however, with Chandler trying to distance himself from McAllister after their night of passion at the funeral, while Ackland's budding romance with Carver hits the rails when she has to reprimand him for mocking Boyden.
| 25 | "Episode 014" "Walking on Water" | Beverley Callard guest stars | Graeme Harper | Alison Fisher | 16 May 2002 |
Gilmore and Stamp break up a fight when two shopkeepers catch a local criminal, Jodie White, with a stolen girocheque. Sharpe suspects Roy Clarke is responsible, having run a counterfeit cheque operation years earlier, but she and Gilmore discover he has left the country. Attention turns to his ex-wife Chrissie and her new husband, Dean Hendrie, suspecting they may be using Roy's old system to set up on their own. When Dean is caught in bed with Jodie, Chrissie decides to help Sharpe nail her husband. However, Sharpe is skeptical about how keen Chrissie is, given how much she stands to gain if Dean goes to jail. Meanwhile, Ackland reconciles with Carver, but she breaks it off again when Chandler offers her the chance to head up the new CSU. Chandler gives into temptation with McAllister, while Rickman and Klein get high at a club, only to get caught up in a brawl between three clubbers. Taviner continues his quest to prove Harry Fullerton's innocence.
| 26 | "Episode 015" "Slippery Slope" | Bryan Murray guest stars | Michael Ferguson | Annie Jones | 23 May 2002 |
Taviner and Glaze join forces when they encounter one another in Harry Fullerton's house, having both broken in at the same time. Rickman frets after coming into the station with Klein while high, having been asked to process the brawling clubbers they arrested earlier in the night. The following morning, they attend a domestic disturbance where a woman is stuck between a husband and lover, who are both abusing her. Bradford and Carver contemplate moves to CSU, while Cullen warns Chandler off pursuing McAllister.
| 27 | "Episode 016" "Crying Wolf" | — | Michael Ferguson | Ed Jones | 30 May 2002 |
Rickman and Klein, then Ackland and Carver, attend repeated calls to a prowler in a woman's back garden. After continually returning to calls with nothing found, Ackland discovers the woman has a habit of false 999 calls to get attention from male first responders. When she calls once more, Ackland decides not to go; will she live to regret the decision? Meanwhile, Lennox makes amends with Glaze and reveals Shona has left him, but he takes his mind off it by asking his friend Hayes what MIT think of Jeff Simpson as suspect for the station firebombing.
| 28 | "Episode 017" "A Run of Good Luck" | John Alford guest stars | Susan Tully | Julian Perkins | 6 June 2002 |
Taviner breaks into a mechanic's garage after tracking down the bike used in Conway's murder. Devlin is suspicious of the lucky find, so Glaze and Lennox present Hayes their evidence on Simpson's alibi being cracked, while Glaze arrests Ian Burrows as he returns to the garage for the bike. Meanwhile, Stamp and Bradford detain two fleeing bank robbers after a dye pack explodes in their getaway car. With the gunman shooting a guard in the bank, neither of the robbers is willing to confess; however, they confess to several other crimes, including a cold case murder. Sharpe and McAllister clash as they disagree on who was the shooter. Elsewhere, Carver decides to blackmail Ackland over her decision to ignore a victim of crime the day before, in order to seal his transfer to CSU.
| 29 | "Episode 018" "Tough Love" | Robert Boulter guest stars | Susan Tully | Marcus Brent | 13 June 2002 |
Meadows is approached by old school villain Frankie Steele to talk sense into his son, who he fears is slipping into a life of crime. When he discovers Steele Jr has been committing armed robberies, a sting is arranged, but disaster strikes when Steele's son discovers his father has set him up. Taviner manages to get himself onto the search at Simpson's, using the chance to plant evidence, but then goes one step further, leaving Glaze in an awkward position. Meanwhile, tensions continue to mount between Sharpe and McAllister, who asks Chandler to put Sharpe in CSU.
| 30 | "Episode 019" "On The Pitch" | Final appearance of Det Supt Susan Devlin | Jim Goddard | Annie Jones | 20 June 2002 |
Stamp organises a football match between the relief and a group of young offenders, but tensions between Gilmore and Boyden boil over, on and off the pitch. Glaze and Sharpe investigate the death of a man found in his council flat, but revelations about his past lead them to interview the young offenders' group in connection with his death. Stamp reencounters Lee Dwyer, but when he falsely accuses him of stealing a collection fund, soon Stamp discovers Dwyer has stolen his wallet in anger. Glaze remains torn over whether he should corroborate Taviner's false allegation that Simpson confessed to the firebombing. Meanwhile, tensions between Sharpe and McAllister reach peak point, with the pair ending up in a full blown brawl in CID.
| 31 | "Episode 020" "Vigilante" | First appearance of PC Gary Best; final appearance of DI Daniel Hayes; Tom Lister and Bryan Murray guest star | Jim Goddard | Ian Harris | 25 June 2002 |
Stamp accompanies new probationer Gary Best out for his first shift. They go in search of Lee Dwyer, after his theft of Stamp's wallet. After tracking him down, Stamp and Best attend an assault on a local yob, with Sharpe suspecting the perpetrator could be a vigilante security guard. Meanwhile, Gilmore decides to make an official complaint about Boyden's continued homophobia, but Ackland convinces him to fight fire with fire. Rickman befriends a young Scouser while clubbing who reminds her of Harker, but she is forced to reevaluate her choices when tragedy strikes.
| 32 | "Episode 021" "Ruffled Feathers" | First appearances of DC Ken Drummond and Insp Gina Gold; A/Insp Matt Boyden returns to Sgt; Ray Fearon guest stars | Ian White | Steve Attridge | 27 June 2002 |
Rickman swears off drugs following the overdose death of a friend the night before, but frets over her missing bag that contains her warrant card and an ecstasy tablet. She struggles to deal with a sudden death, as well as a call to a young girl who has been pricked by an improperly discarded needle in a pile of medical waste, with the girl later dying in hospital. Sharpe enlists the help of her husband on the case, an environmental health officer, while new DC Ken Drummond goes undercover to catch the illegal dumper. The case is linked to the sudden death and a cold case of negligence that led to a death; could the prime suspect commit murder to keep his secret under wraps? Drummond is not the only new arrival to Sun Hill; Inspector Gina Gold breezes in and immediately clashes with Ackland, making it clear from the off that the relief are in for a rough ride. Meanwhile, Best reunites with an old flame.
| 33 | "Episode 022" "Prove Your Worth" | First appearance of DC Brandon Kane, return of PC Luke Ashton; James MacPherson guest stars | Ian White | Gerard McKenna | 2 July 2002 |
PC Luke Ashton returns to Sun Hill three years after his departure, keen to make a better impression than he did in his first stint. However, he shows up late and clashes with Gilmore, having been splashed by a passing car he discovers was driven by new trainee DC Brandon Kane. He joins Ackland, Carver and Bradford as the new CSU opens for business, but their first case of racial harassment case turns into a drugs sting, leading Ackland to again clash with Gold. Meanwhile, Best and Stamp investigate a suspected escort agency, but Best is stunned when a punter is killed, leading him to make a grim discovery about an old friend. Elsewhere, Webb visits an old friend of Chandler's as he continues his quest to destroy his superintendent.
| 34 | "Episode 023" "Aptitude Test" | Brooke Kinsella guest stars | Ged Maguire | Matthew Leys | 4 July 2002 |
Rickman attends a call about a missing teenager, Liz Chambers, who is immediately found at her boyfriend's. The case escalates when the girl's father assaults her boyfriend, Shane Pellow. When she sides with Pellow, Rickman pairs with Kane in an attempt to change her mind. Gilmore gives Ashton a chance by investigating a series of suspected homophobic attacks. Gold takes a different, more direct approach, but it works to great effect. Meanwhile, Best and Stamp arrest Lee Dwyer for theft, but Stamp gives him another chance; will he live to regret it?
| 35 | "Episode 024" "Sitting Tennants" | Brooke Kinsella, Katy Murphy and Peter Guinness guest star | Ged Maguire | Matthew Leys | 9 July 2002 |
Glaze and Drummond investigate an arson attack on a shop. They suspect it is aimed at sitting tenants living above the shop, owned by a shady property firm based in Belize in negotiations with corrupt local developer Christopher Vanderbilt. Neil Chambers asks Rickman to lie in court as he goes to court for assaulting Shane Pellow. Meanwhile, Gold and Ashton find themselves on the end of official complaints, while McAllister returns to work with a bombshell for Chandler.
| 36 | "Episode 025" "Too Close to the Wind" | First appearance of PC Kerry Young; Aml Ameen guest stars | Dermot Boyd | Hugh Ellis | 11 July 2002 |
Stamp has to step in again when Lee Dwyer is arrested, this time for smashing up a classroom at his school. Ashton remains determined to prove his worth to Gilmore, risking his life to talk down a gunman holding two teenage girls hostage. When Gilmore chastises him instead of praising him for the heroism, Ashton goes to Gold to make an official complaint. Carver investigates a suspected racially motivated assault on a local black lad, but Bradford's poor handling leads to the youth rejecting Carver's help, and he is subject to a second attack. Meanwhile, Klein has a one night stand with a girl in a club, later becoming stunned when she shows up at Sun Hill to reveal she is the new PC, Kerry Young. Chandler reels from the news of McAllister's pregnancy, and Taviner becomes a victim of blackmail, suspecting Simpson may be responsible.
| 37 | "Episode 026" "Playing Runaway" | Gary Webster and Philip Martin Brown guest star | Dermot Boyd | Clive Dawson | 16 July 2002 |
McAllister's mind is off the job, with Chandler pressuring her into having an abortion, but she and Webb investigate an assault on a businessman who has his takings stolen. Taviner fears his role in the fire being exposed when he becomes a victim of blackmail, but when Glaze finds Taviner's number in an assault victim's phone, he confronts his partner in crime over their framing of Simpson. Meanwhile, Lee Dwyer is arrested again, this time for graffiti, then plays runaway when his mum and stepdad have a domestic dispute, making an early morning house call to Stamp.
| 38 | "Episode 027" "Old Tricks" | Nia Roberts and Gary Webster guest star | John Davies | Julian Perkins | 18 July 2002 |
Stamp and Best investigate when a camera cuts out during a theft at a local shopping mall. The owner suspects the security guard working in the CCTV control room, but when he is cleared, they get an early lead when an informant provides info on the sale in a pub. When the raid goes awry, suspicion turns to local loan shark Joe Nash, who is then subject to a vicious attack, bringing an unexpected suspect into the frame. The lottery syndicate are thrilled when they hit the jackpot, but why is Hollis acting so suspiciously? Meanwhile, McAllister struggles with planning her impending abortion.
| 39 | "Episode 028" "Missing Without Trace" | Gary Webster guest stars | John Davies | Steve Hughes | 23 July 2002 |
Stamp is mortified when Lee Dwyer accuses him of sexual abuse. Carver is assigned as FLO for the Dwyers, causing a rift in his friendship with Stamp. As rumours spread throughout the relief, a huge break in the case turns it on its head. Kane and Rickman are concerned when Liz Chambers is reported missing, with her boyfriend Shane Pellow unaware of her movements, and they fear the worst when they get a call about a body washing up on the banks of the River Thames. Meanwhile, Bradford maliciously tells Young's fiancé Martin that she cheated on him with Klein.
| 40 | "Episode 029" "First Day Collar" | First appearance of DS Phil Hunter; James MacPherson guest stars | Steve Finn | Maxwell Young | 25 July 2002 |
New DS Phil Hunter hits the ground running when he investigates a burglary with Glaze, where the suspect used the bathroom during the break in. However, the arrest unnerves Rickman and Klein when the suspect gives up his dealer, the same man Rickman and Klein use. When the dealer spots Rickman in her uniform, he tells an intrigued Hunter. Stamp is frustrated as his suspension continues, despite Lee Dwyer withdrawing his allegations. Meanwhile, Cullen is left infuriated when Chandler hands the Liz Chambers murder over to Barton Street, so he decides to give Meadows a lead in his quest to bring Chandler down.
| 41 | "Episode 030" "No Loyalty" | Victoria Finney and Gary Webster guest star | Steve Finn | Marc Pye | 30 July 2002 |
Carver decides to step down as FLO for the Dwyers as his friendship with Stamp hits the rails, but things between them get worse when Carver tells CIB that Stamp and Dwyer shared a hug during a charity football tournament. Kane takes over as FLO, and immediately suspects the father may be the abuser. Meanwhile, Drummond and Hunter team up to track down a phone scammer who has hacked Drummond's phone, and Hunter takes a shine to Drummond's friend and contact. Gilmore is left humiliated when his now ex-boyfriend dumps his belongings at the front of the station.
| 42 | "Episode 031" "Conflicting Information" | — | Chris Lovett | Len Collin | 1 August 2002 |
The redeveloped CID opens for the first time, with the team immediately tackling two cases; Drummond investigates a driving instructor who takes bribes for passing marks, while Glaze and Sharpe get conflicting information on an upcoming armed robbery. Meadows goes with Glaze's info, putting Sharpe on an indecent exposure case with Gold. Sharpe is furious to have been sidelined, and is infuriated further when the armed robbery matches her info, leaving Glaze and Hunter in the wrong place. Meanwhile, Kane thinks he's cracked the Dwyer abuse case when Lee is arrested for causing £2000 worth of damage in a toy store, while McAllister attends her 16-week scan.
| 43 | "Episode 032" "Bait" | — | Chris Lovett | Ian Harris | 6 August 2002 |
Cullen is suspicious when McAllister comes to work with a black eye following her encounter with Chandler. Hunter and Glaze are hauled over the coals by the super following the failed armed robbery sting, with the security guard shot in the raid critically injured. Cullen tries to get McAllister to talk to Ackland, leaving Chandler on edge. Gold and Sharpe continue their efforts to arrest a flasher, having now exposed himself to a teenage girl. Young decides to act as bait, while Stamp returns to work after being cleared of the abuse allegations. He pairs with Best to investigate an elderly couple acting as vigilantes by attacking loan sharks with bricks.
| 44 | "Episode 033" "Loggerheads" | First appearance of FDO Roberta Cryer; Nicola Stapleton guest stars | Declan O'Dwyer | John Milne | 8 August 2002 |
Meadows is left determined to nail the armed robbers from the bank heist, following the death of the security guard shot during the raid. The only problem is their key witness, Brian Kirby, has been arrested for the series of indecent exposures investigated by Gold and Sharpe. Glaze investigates a vicious assault linked to local thug Jason Pope, suspecting the victim is sleeping around with Pope's wife Tina. Meanwhile, Simpson's threats to Taviner escalate drastically when Simpson's thugs smash up the Area Car, leaving Hollis terrified. New front desk officer Robbie cons Stamp, Hollis and Boyden by making her think she's psychic, but the trio are unaware she has family links to a Sun Hill legend.
| 45 | "Episode 034" "Protection" | Nicola Stapleton, David Walliams and Lewis Collins guest star | Declan O'Dwyer | Eric Deacon | 13 August 2002 |
Uniform attend a protest at a stem cell research facility. Taviner ends up receiving an official complaint for his brute tactics at the protest, while he does his utmost to keep Hollis in his sights, after Simpson's threats to abduct Hollis if Taviner doesn't confess to framing Simpson. Gilmore, Ashton and Young attend the head researcher's home, who has been subject to a series of death threats. As the man's wife goes out in his car, it explodes, critically injuring her. Events take a twist when the prime suspect and head activist is revealed to be the brother of the researcher's assistant, with whom he has been having an affair. Glaze struggles to get Tina Pope back on side following the abduction of her son, while Cullen tells Chandler he's had enough and demands a transfer.
| 46 | "Episode 035" "Impostors" | Nicola Stapleton and Edna Doré guest star | Paul Marcus | Tom Needham | 15 August 2002 |
Glaze continues his quest to get Tina Pope to give evidence against her husband Jason for the GBH on her lover. Ackland is surprised to learn a woman has been impersonating her to rob the elderly. Rickman bonds with local journalist Simon Kitson, after he helps her investigate Ackland's doppelganger. Taviner continues to keep a close watch on Hollis, but when he gets suspicious of Taviner's reluctance to take calls, Hollis finds himself in danger investigating a break in. Meanwhile, Chandler continues to block Cullen's attempted transfer to MIT, and McAllister admits to Meadows that she is pregnant.
| 47 | "Episode 036" "Officer Down" | Final appearance of DI Alex Cullen; Philip Wright guest stars | Paul Marcus | Nicholas McInerny | 20 August 2002 |
Taviner starts a one-man quest to rescue Hollis after his abduction by Simpson's associates, not willing to expose his role in the fire to senior management. Young attends an RTC off duty in which a young boy has been hit by a car that failed to stop. Meadows and McAllister investigate the car's owner after he assaults another man, smashes up his former office and then goes AWOL, with his wife fearing he is suicidal. Glaze starts fearing for Tina Pope when she goes missing, while CID are stunned when Cullen announces he's moving to MIT at the end of the shift. Lennox, still looking to improve his life after a tough few months, contemplates joining Cullen.
| 48 | "Episode 037" "One Last Day" | Temporary departure of DC Duncan Lennox; Charles Lawson guest stars | Jamie Payne | Lin Coghlan | 22 August 2002 |
The relief spring into action after discovering Hollis has been abducted. Lennox determines to find Hollis on his last day at Sun Hill before joining MIT. Gold and Meadows are furious when a lying Taviner changes his story, admitting Simpson is responsible, and that Hollis has been missing longer than he claimed. A series of raids are launched against several of Simpson's associates, but they all go nowhere. In an abandoned slaughterhouse, Hollis weighs up his options as he plans an escape. A guilt ridden Glaze sees Tina Pope's father after the discovery of her body. Meanwhile, Simpson's trial for the station firebombing and Conway's murder begins, but as Taviner prepares to take the stand, a death threat against Hollis is given to him in the court. With Hollis at risk, will Taviner lie under oath, or finally admit to his crime?
| 49 | "Episode 038" "Tactful Approach" | First appearance of DS Samantha Nixon; temporary departure of PC Des Taviner; final appearance of Jeff Simpson; Charles Lawson guest stars | Jamie Payne | Catrin Clarke | 27 August 2002 |
New DS Samantha Nixon arrives and is immediately tasked with heading up the investigation into the abduction of Hollis, who wakes up in hospital to see Taviner after being rescued. Nixon and Sharpe pair to interview Hollis, but they suspect he is holding something back. The Simpson trial enters its second day, and Glaze, after attending Tina Pope's post-mortem, torments himself as he contemplates admitting he framed Simpson for the station fire. Meanwhile, McAllister bonds with a young mother who is accusing her neighbours of harassment, but when events take a drastic turn, McAllister suspects the woman is suffering from postpartum psychosis. Gilmore is pushed away by Ashton following their kiss the night before.
| 50 | "Episode 039" "Certain Uncertainties" | DS Samantha Nixon becomes Acting DI; Roger Lloyd-Pack guest stars | Peter Butler | Chris Ould | 28 August 2002 |
Hunter's maverick methods get him a job as a security guard at a club run by suspected drug kingpin Mick Mortimer. Having secured the job, he convinces Meadows to approve an undercover operation. Hunter recruits Klein to join him, but doesn't tell Meadows that Klein will be working undercover as a drug dealer. In the wake of Cullen's transfer to MIT, Chandler hastily moves Nixon up to Acting DI. Meadows is frustrated as Chandler disregards his opinion about promoting Nixon, so he decides to restart his quest to bring Chandler down. Meanwhile, Ashton and Young attend a hit and run, with the fleeing driver suspected of cultivating cannabis.
| 51 | "Episode 040" "Jeopardy" | Roger Lloyd-Pack, Tony Booth, Liz Smith and Brigit Forsyth guest star | Peter Butler | John Milne | 29 August 2002 |
Hunter begins his work undercover. Klein gets a rough start when Mortimer threatens him; however, Hunter gets him work as a dealer for the club. Gilmore hauls Young and Ashton over the coals when they show up late for shift. Carver and Ackland investigate a series of disturbances at a local almshouse, with the residents fearing they are being victimised. Meanwhile, Meadows and Webb track down Chandler's ex-girlfriend Anne Merrick, but immediately hit a stumbling block.
| 52 | "Episode 041" "Gone Native" | Roger Lloyd-Pack, Tony Booth, Liz Smith and Brigit Forsyth guest star | Julie Edwards | Martin Jameson | 3 September 2002 |
Klein confronts Hunter after being forced to use cocaine to maintain his cover. Carver and Ackland continue to investigate the attacks on the almshouse, with one of the residents dying after a shock-induced heart attack. Meadows and Webb finally get to see Anne Merrick, who is more than happy to dish the dirt on her Hendon days, but drops a massive bombshell that could be crucial to their mission to end Chandler. Meanwhile, McAllister puts herself and her baby at risk by forcing her way onto a drugs raid.
| 53 | "Episode 042" "Requiem" | Roger Lloyd-Pack and James MacPherson guest star | Julie Edwards | Henrietta Hardy | 4 September 2002 |
Recently cleared flasher Brian Kirby is arrested by Stamp and Best after breaking into the home of one of his former victims, Miriam Wray. Meadows confronts Hunter and Klein over the raid from the night before, realising the dealers they arrested were not club regulars. Hunter pressures Klein to get a result, but his relationship with waitress Sandie threatens to derail the case. Webb lands himself in hot water as he goes maverick on his investigation into Chandler, who begins to reconsider his position as a father to be after McAllister's accident in the club raid.
| 54 | "Episode 043" "Quick Off The Mark" | Vincenzo Pellegrino, Roger Lloyd-Pack and James MacPherson guest star | Crispin Reece | Marianne Colbran | 12 September 2002 |
Hunter springs into action after Klein lets slip to waitress Sandie that he is undercover. Hunter's actions save Klein's skin, but Sandie is left at risk as a result, infuriating Klein. Peter Marsden tells Chandler about Webb's visit the day before, leading Webb and Meadows to face disciplinary action. With Chandler placing the blame firmly on Webb's shoulders, the young DC is devastated to find out his days at Sun Hill are over, with Chandler arranging an immediate transfer to Barton Street. Meanwhile, Ashton risks his and Gilmore's lives when Young is held hostage by an armed murder suspect.
| 55 | "Episode 044" "Access Denied" | Roger Lloyd-Pack guest stars | Crispin Reece | Ed Jones | 18 September 2002 |
Hunter gets ready to spearhead a raid on Mick Mortimer and his boss as they prepare for a major drug deal, although his colleagues are unaware that Hunter has arranged for another group to break up the party, leading to a dramatic ambush. Klein frets over Sandie's attack the night before, and he is mortified when another body is pulled from the River Thames. Cryer lets slip the abuse allegations against Stamp to journalist Simon Kitson. Meanwhile, Chandler goes to visit old girlfriend Anne Merrick, but she makes a dramatic decision after their conversation.
| 56 | "Episode 045" "Nail in the Coffin" | Judy Holt guest stars | Afonso Sousa | Katherine Smith | 19 September 2002 |
Meadows informs Chandler of the allegations of rape against him by Anne Merrick. The desperate Superintendent asks McAllister for an alibi. Stamp becomes the target for a lynch mob after Simon Kitson's questions about the sexual abuse allegations, leading to a near riot outside Stamp's home. A guilt ridden Cryer admits her role in Stamp's exposure, who is left furious as a result. Meanwhile, McAllister targets a pair of burglars who are breaking into the homes of the angry mob at Stamp's home.
| 57 | "Episode 046" "Improper Conduct" | Sam Aston, Jessica Harris and John McEnery guest star | Afonso Sousa | Nick Saltrese | 25 September 2002 |
Bradford and Kane hunt for a missing Asian girl, but soon discover that she has gone on the run to avoid being forced into an arranged marriage. Cryer desperately tries to make amends with Stamp following the public revelation of his abuse allegations, while Carver confronts Simon Kitson in order to get him to apologise. Chandler proposes to McAllister in order to get her to provide an alibi for the Anne Merrick rape, and when Meadows discovers this, McAllister confesses that Chandler is the father of her baby. Chandler is relieved when forensics clear him of the allegations by Merrick, but events take a dramatic turn to land him in deeper trouble. Meanwhile, Best's sister and nephew show up at the station, and Stamp makes a kind gesture to help her out.
| 58 | "Episode 047" "Deeper Waters" | First appearance of DCI Andrew Ross; return of DC Duncan Lennox | Robert Knights | Julian Perkins | 26 September 2002 |
Chandler fears for his career and freedom after Anne Merrick is found dead at the bottom of a multi-storey car park. McAllister provides info on Chandler's whereabouts the night of Merrick's death, with his alibi between leaving work and meeting McAllister sketchy; that he was helping a disabled driver change his tire in a red light district. DCI Andrew Ross from MIT arrives to head up the serial killer investigation from Sun Hill, accompanied by the returning Lennox. He immediately takes a shine to Nixon, who is keen to get on the murder case. Meanwhile, Kane and Bradford continue their search for a missing Asian girl, but when Kane finds her, Bradford makes a dangerous decision that puts Kane and the girl at risk.
| 59 | "Episode 048" "Roses Are Red" | Helen Grace guest stars | Robert Knights | Annie Jones | 2 October 2002 |
Bradford is left to face the music after her actions lead to the abduction of a runaway Asian girl, with a gang of masked thugs ambushing Kane outside the station. Kane is furious when he finds out, but he gets back on the case, and determines to find the girl before she can be forced into an arranged marriage. Cryer admits to accidentally smashing the gift left by the man who can alibi Chandler, but McAllister is delighted as the broken bottle helps her prove his alibi. Despite Meadows and Chandler's relationship improving, Webb returns to Sun Hill after his enforced transfer to Barton Street, and he urges Meadows not to give up on bringing Chandler down. Meanwhile, Stamp and Best investigate a sudden death; Best's first death notice doesn't go as expected.
| 60 | "Episode 049" "On the Side" | Campbell Morrison, Sam Aston, Helen Grace and Jessica Harris guest star | Steve Finn | Ian Harris | 3 October 2002 |
Chandler is furious when Webb posts multiple copies of Simon Kitson's slanderous article about him around the station. Hauling Meadows over the coals, Chandler takes control of CID, causing Meadows to put bringing him down back to the top of his list. Chandler meets DAC Gordon Cooper and Sgt Dave Gilbert, associates from his Hendon days, with Meadows and Webb finding Chandler's achilles as a result; his brother James. Bradford and Kane attend a domestic disturbance in which a girl is arrested on the word of her father and stepmother; however, the girl turns the screw by giving evidence about her father's illegal alcohol sales. Meanwhile, Nixon and Lennox mount on a OBBO on an alleged suspect for the River Murders, but all is not as it seems. Best is furious to discover his sister's deadbeat boyfriend has moved in with her.
| 61 | "Episode 050" "Ready or Not" | Campbell Morrison, Sam Aston, Helen Grace and Jessica Harris guest star | Steve Finn | Maxwell Young | 9 October 2002 |
Chandler attends the funeral of Anne Merrick, but his presence, along with that of Meadows, unnerves her daughter Jennie. Meadows keeps the pressure on James Chandler, certain he is the weak link in uncovering the Marsden rape case, although Webb goes to see DAC Cooper, who then threatens Chandler to get himself out of the frame. Drummond and Sharpe investigate the assault on Vanessa Casson, but stepdaughter Vicki's allegations against her father's illicit alcohol sales seem to be going nowhere. Meanwhile, Young suggests Ashton moves in with her, but she snatches the flat from ex-fiancée Martin Porter, who is left furious as a result. Best suspects his sister's boyfriend is assaulting her son.
| 62 | "Episode 051" "Wisdom of the Wise" | Campbell Morrison, Lois Baxter and Helen Grace guest star | Baz Taylor | Damian Wayling | 10 October 2002 |
Meadows and Webb think they've hit the jackpot when James Chandler is arrested for drunk and disorderly. Despite Chandler attending a review panel for a new job, Meadows and Webb continue their quest to destroy him. Young is stunned to discover her ex-boyfriend Martin Porter has been arrested for attempted abduction, putting him firmly on top of the serial killer suspect list. After Gold finds out Kitson was the informant for Porter's arrest, Rickman is warned about getting involved with a journalist. Gold decides to withdraw Rickman from the serial killer enquiry owing to a potential conflict of interest.
| 63 | "Episode 052" "Saving Face" | Sally George, Hywel Bennett and Benedict Wong guest star | Baz Taylor | Marcus Brent | 16 October 2002 |
Chandler is furious to discover his brother James has betrayed him by giving a statement about Louise Marsden's rape, causing Chandler to inflict a savage beating. Chandler marries McAllister in a last gasp attempt to stop Meadows bringing him down, but he doesn't count on Webb taking the statement himself to tell CIB. McAllister soon discovers what her new husband is really like, as he refuses to take no for an answer when she rejects his advances in a hotel. Hunter and Drummond mount an OBBO to catch a robber, but Hunter falls for the man's sister and ends up being held hostage when their target comes back unexpectedly. Meanwhile, Nixon is left furious when an old rival is assigned as profiler for the River Murders, DS David Chiu.
| 64 | "Episode 053" "Conflict of Interest" | Final appearance of Superintendent Tom Chandler; Hywel Bennett, Benedict Wong, James MacPherson, Campbell Morrison and Julie Graham guest star | Nigel Keen | Gerard McKenna | 16 October 2002 |
McAllister reels after being raped by Chandler. At Sun Hill, he reaches breaking point as Meadows and Webb go to see DAC Cooper to get him to testify, and he is more than happy to drop Chandler in it. Webb relishes in calling Chandler to gloat, and his morning gets worse when Webb calls Peter Marsden, who confronts his former friend after finally discovering the truth about Chandler raping his sister. With Hunter and Sharpe investigating a shooting on the Bronte Estate, Chandler takes the gun from forensics and holds McAllister hostage, intent on killing her, her unborn baby and himself. When Nixon tells Meadows that Chandler is armed, he races back to Sun Hill to save McAllister's life.
| 65 | "Episode 054" "Game Over" | First appearance of PC Gemma Osbourne, return of PC Des Taviner; Hywel Bennett, Benedict Wong and Anna Karen guest star | Nigel Keen | Annie Jones | 23 October 2002 |
Panic breaks out following a gunshot from the DCI's office; Meadows emerges with McAllister in premature labour, leaving behind a deceased Chandler. Cryer tries to keep McAllister calm as Stamp races her to hospital in the area car. With Cryer absent from her post, Rickman takes up the front office, where she meets new recruit Gemma Osbourne. Following Cryer's return to the station, Rickman heads out with Osbourne and they find a baby abandoned in a park. Young and Ashton are paired together at a minor RTA which leads them to a corner shop robbery, but Ashton is reluctant to arrest the prime suspect, Gilmore's boyfriend Carl. Gold leads Rickman, Osbourne, Cryer and Young on a night out to take their minds off the days events, and Rickman is surprised to discover her cab home is driven by ex-boyfriend Simon's sister Pat.
| 66–67 | "Episode 055–056" "Honeytrap" | Aired as 90-minute episode, separated into two episodes on DVD release; Hywel Bennett, Benedict Wong and Anna Karen guest star | Susan Tully | Steve Hughes and Jaden Clark | 24 October 2002 |
Part 1 – Honeytrap: Taviner returns to work in a foul mood, perplexing Hollis; however, his mood improves when he meets Osbourne. Taviner and Hollis pair up to pursue Andy Bennett, a local yob who has been tormenting elderly people at a bingo hall. When an elderly lady is mugged, she has a stroke, leaving Taviner to recklessly go after them. Ashton tries to track down Young after falsely telling Gilmore they're engaged, and his frustrations get the better of him when he snaps at a gay couple who have been broken into. Meanwhile, Nixon continues her private investigation into serial killer suspect Peter Baxter. Part 2 – Risky Behaviour: Taviner pairs with Osbourne to track down Andy Bennett, and his partner in crime Joey Bradshaw, prime suspect for the mugging at the bingo hall. Osbourne and Taviner clash when she rejects his advances, revealing she is a lesbian, so Hollis returns to the Area Car. When they pursue Bennett and Bradshaw, leading to a crash, Taviner makes a daring rescue. In hospital, Taviner stuns Hollis with a surprise confession. Baxter lures Nixon into a trap, who goes to see him against warnings from her colleagues. Thanks to Cryer's prior knowledge, Baxter is arrested, with MIT hopeful that they now have the serial killer in custody.
| 68 | "Episode 057" "Heaven's Callin'" | First use of the standard ITV previously, next time and end credits; Hywel Bennett and Benedict Wong guest star | Michael Morris | Phillip Gladwin | 30 October 2002 |
Taviner discharges himself from hospital after writing a confession to the station firebombing. When he tries to track down Hollis to talk to him about his confession to him the day before, Hollis refuses to talk to him about it, instead focusing on the vicious assault of a schoolboy. Finding the attacker atop a high rise building, intent on committing suicide, Taviner talks him down but then takes his place. He asks Hollis to take his confession letter to Sun Hill after he jumps off; can Hollis stop his best friend? Nixon, Ross and Chiu attend the post-mortem when another body is pulled out of the river, but while Ross is thrilled at the thought of finally catching the killer, Nixon isn't too sure on Baxter anymore.
| 69 | "Episode 058" "Rogue Victim" | John Bowler and Julie Graham guest star | Michael Morris | Helen Childs | 31 October 2002 |
As uniform clear up a local red light district, Hunter and Webb investigate a rogue prostitute who is robbing her punters. A man reports his wife missing, and Cryer urges to help the man, who is worried she could become a victim of the serial killer. Ashton and Young's engagement party hits the rails when the club's owner bars them for the arrest of his brother, a community leader spearheading the clean up of the red light district who has been using the girls for his own use. Meanwhile, Nixon is furious to have been withdrawn from the serial killer enquiry for not telling Ross that she doubted Peter Baxter's guilt.
| 70 | "Episode 059" "Lock and Load – Part 1" | Julie Graham guest stars | Robert Maestro | Patrick Melanaphy | 6 November 2002 |
A drug war kicks off on the Bronte Estate, with the kingpins using local kids to attack the police as a diversion tactic. Boyden and Young are part of a number of officers attacked when they chase a suspect for a failing to stop crash into a packed pub. Meadows does his utmost to get Sun Hill on track before the arrival of the station's new superintendent, with Gold stunned to discover it is someone from her past. Ackland helps a young mother whose son has been drawn in by the gangs. Hunter plays away from his girlfriend, Linda Kendrick, with her daughter Chloe.
| 71 | "Episode 060" "Lock and Load – Part 2" | First appearance of Superintendent Adam Okaro; Julie Graham guest stars | Robert Maestro | Maxwell Young | 7 November 2002 |
Hunter uses his leverage on Klein to have him and Rickman break up a drug deal on the Bronte Estate. The prime target, Tony "Reload" Barrett, pulls a machete on Klein and is arrested as a result. Hunter's actions lead to an attempted abduction at a local school, but a brave parent steps in and stops it, with Gold stunned to discover the parent is her former lover and Sun Hill's new Superintendent Adam Okaro. He immediately gets briefed by Meadows, Gold and Nixon over the recent troubles on the Bronte, but he soon finds events are getting worse by the minute.
| 72 | "Episode 061" "Lock and Load – Part 3" | Glen Murphy, Julie Graham and Corinne Skinner-Carter guest star | Jamie Payne | Matthew Leys | 13 November 2002 |
Following the abduction of Reload's brother, Okaro comes down hard on Hunter after realising his relationships with Linda and Chloe Kendrick have caused the unrest on the Bronte. Hunter is forced to tell Reload what has happened to his brother, and he asks Okaro for a deal. The relief are stunned when Okaro asks for Reload to be bailed and his drugs to be returned to him, but is their a method to his madness? Hunter returns to the Bronte and ends up getting caught in the act with Chloe Kendrick by her furious mother Linda, who drops a massive bombshell, leaving Hunter fearful. Meadows contemplates a transfer to East Anglia after immediately clashing with Okaro.
| 73 | "Episode 062" "First Day Blues" | First appearance of PC Ruby Buxton; Julie Graham and Glen Murphy guest star | Jamie Payne | Patrea Smallacombe | 14 November 2002 |
New PC Ruby Buxton pairs with Stamp on her first day, investigating an assault on a local prostitute. Hunter hides away following threats from Frank Magorian to kill him for sleeping with his wife and daughter. When Magorian sees Klein talking to Chloe Kendrick, he walks up to Hunter, who falsely identifies Klein as "PC Phil Hunter"; Klein is savagely assaulted by Magorian as a result. Young is victim of a break in and has her engagement ring stolen, while Gilmore's boyfriend Carl steals and crashes his car. Simon Kitson gives Nixon a key lead in the serial killer case.
| 74–75 | "Episode 063–064" "A Cry For Help" | Aired as 90-minute episode, separated into two on DVD release; first appearance of Abigail Nixon; Sarah Hadland guest stars | Michael Offer | Maxwell Young and Tom Needham | 20 November 2002 |
Part 1 – A Cry for Help: The relief look for Vicki Casson, a girl who was involved with a Sun Hill case a few months earlier, sparking fears she could be the next victim of the serial killer. Nixon continues her search for "The Baptist", a voyeur who took the photos of Tina Pope's body. Shane Pellow, boyfriend of the first victim and an undertaker by trade, becomes prime suspect. McAllister throws herself into action while she is in hospital on maternity leave, eager to help when a baby is abducted from the hospital's maternity ward. Meanwhile, Nixon is embarrassed when her teenage daughter Abigail is arrested after being found drunk in a local shopping mall. Part 2 – The Full Guided Tour: The spate of car thefts escalate when a 4X4 is stolen with two kids in the back. Okaro links the thefts to a pirate radio station, leading to an undercover sting. Meadows is asked to assist Lennox in the absence of DCI Ross, with Shane Pellow the prime suspect for the murder of Vicki Casson. As Osbourne and Taviner continue to clash, he steals the Area Car to respond to a call, with Vicki Cason's father assaulting a man who is offering "guided tours" of where the serial killer is leaving bodies. Osbourne gets her own back on Taviner in humiliating fashion. Meanwhile, Boyden and Glaze investigate when a man is brought into hospital, with his injuries suggesting he has been tortured.
| 76 | "Episode 065" "Close To Home" | — | Peter Butler | Simon Ashford | 21 November 2002 |
Nixon fears for her daughter Abigail after she goes missing. Kane is ordered to assist, meaning Ackland and Carver have to babysit his kids, Zoe and Jordan, with his ex-wife Tanya busy attending to her hospitalised mother. When Zoe falls and scrapes her knee, Tanya says she is accepting a job in Scotland and taking the kids with her. Meanwhile, Taviner and Osbourne continue to clash; when they receive a call about a burglary, they race between the Area Car and IRV to get there first, unaware that Okaro and Gold are listening in to intercept them.
| 77 | "Episode 066" "Walk in the Park" | Helen Blatch guest stars | Peter Butler | Steve Griffiths | 27 November 2002 |
Taviner and Osbourne are paired together on foot after being suspended from driving for their race the day before. They're both furious for the punishment, but Okaro has an embarrassing plan for their proper punishment. Bradford and Kane investigate an attack on a shop, and Kane suspects that an elderly witness is being abused by her son. Tanya presses Ackland over Zoe's accident the day before, but as Kane frets over losing access, Bradford takes action to stop her. The witness in Kane's case claims she's had her car stolen, and then she is subject to a vicious beating. She points the finger at the boy who smashed up the shop, but when it is revealed he was arrested for a different assault at the same time, Kane suspects her attacker is closer to home.
| 78 | "Episode 067" "All in a Day's Work" | Ellen Thomas guest stars | Crispin Reece | Clive Dawson | 28 November 2002 |
Osbourne meets an old flame, who reports a pornographic video she confiscated at the school where she works, seemingly showing an underage girl having sex under duress. When Hunter takes a shine to her friend, Osbourne hatches a mischievous plan to humiliate the rogue DS. Carver and Bradford go undercover at a pub owned by a female victim of assault, but an OBBO to ensnare a gun dealer is blown out when somebody rumbles Carver's cover. Meanwhile, Kane's wife Tanya is in court for her drink driving arrest the week before, vowing to end Kane's access if she loses her job offer in Scotland as a result.
| 79 | "Episode 068" "Clouded Judgement" | Russell Tovey and Richard Hope guest star | Crispin Reece | John Milne | 4 December 2002 |
Taviner and Hollis attend to a schizophrenic teenager swinging from a scaffolding pole, then again when his neighbour's shed burns down. McAllister, who has decided to put her baby son Andrew up for adoption, lets her emotions get the better of her as the teenager's father insists on confessing to his son's crime. Rickman gets a break when Shane Pellow's girlfriend says she thinks Pellow is the serial killer. Meanwhile, Klein returns to work after his assault and bonds with Buxton, but he burns his bridges with Rickman when she arrests his dealer.
| 80 | "Episode 069" "Cop Idol – Part 1" | Tony Guilfoyle guest stars | John Davies | Nicholas McInerny | 5 December 2002 |
Klein determines to make amends with Rickman after his harsh comments to her the day before. After realising he loves her, he sets about getting Hunter off his back and getting off the drugs to win her trust back. Rickman ends up getting into a fight with Shane Pellow when she helps his girlfriend Amber escape, but Simon Kitson comes to her rescue. When Young's ex Martin Porter assaults her, Rickman arrests him and urges Young to press charges. Young returns the favour by advising Rickman to cut Kitson off, but she is unable to meet him as she ends up in grave danger. Meanwhile, Bradford is stunned when a teacher reports a young boy is being assaulted, with the boy in question Kane's son Jordan.
| 81 | "Episode 070" "Cop Idol – Part 2" | First appearances of Christine and Dennis Weaver; Tim Barlow guest stars | John Davies | Julian Perkins | 11 December 2002 |
Rickman fears for her life as she comes round in the boot of a car. The relief get "Cop Idol" underway as the Christmas party gets in full swing, unaware that Rickman has been abducted. Klein heads to Hunter's old station in an attempt to get dirt on the DS, desperate to get him off his back. When an old flame and colleague points Klein in the direction of Christine Weaver, wife of a crime boss, Klein is giddy and stunned as he uncovers a massive secret about Hunter. Meanwhile, Stamp and Best find a wandering man and take him home, only to discover he is a retired police officer with no money. With a caring neighbour who checks on him and a builder working on the man's house prime suspects for the theft of his money, they are surprised to find out neither were responsible for the loss of money.
| 82 | "Episode 071" "Falling" | Final appearance of PC Cass Rickman; Edna Doré guest stars | Nigel Keen | Tom Needham | 12 December 2002 |
The cheerful mood around the relief comes crashing down when Lennox turns in Rickman's bag. Meadows and Gold try to get info from her close friends and colleagues, but everyone is on edge when a body is found; however, they discover the woman is too young to be Rickman. Simon Kitson is arrested after fighting with Shane Pellow, and soon becomes a prime suspect for the murders. As a downtrodden Klein walks along the river, he makes the discovery that confirms everyone's worst fears: Rickman's body. As Okaro rallies the troops to get justice for their murdered colleague, MIT question Kitson, and the net closes in as he is connected to more of the victims.
| 83 | "Episode 072" "Code of Conduct – Part 1" | Jaime Murray, JoAnne Good and Georgina Hale guest star | Nigel Keen | Sally Garland | 18 December 2002 |
Gold investigates when a teenage boxer, Tommy Reynolds, is accused of deliberately inflicting a serious injury on his opponent. When Tommy asks Gold to track down his biological mother, Gold is stunned to discover she is her childhood best friend, Marilyn Hendrie, who married recently deceased armed robber Ed Costello before his death. As Taviner gets a tip-off for a planned armed robbery, it is linked to Costello, so Best and Buxton are sent undercover at the department store that is being targeted. Simon Kitson continues to plead his innocence, but when he is visited by his obsessive sister, he becomes unstable between the pressure and grief, making a snap decision. Meanwhile, Ashton tells Gilmore that his boyfriend Carl is HIV positive.
| 84 | "Episode 073" "Seeing Red – Part 2" | Jaime Murray, JoAnne Good and Georgina Hale guest-star | Steve Finn | Steve Hughes | 19 December 2002 |
The relief are left reeling after Simon Kitson commits suicide in his cell. With enough evidence against him, MIT decide to scale down the River Murders enquiry, assuming Kitson committed suicide because he was guilty. A group of the relief head up to Liverpool for Rickman's funeral, but Ashton fails to convince Young to attend. Klein is furious when Pat Kitson attends the service; however, they end up bonding owing to their respective losses. Klein's depression takes him back into drug addiction. Gold continues her quest to nail Marilyn Costello for her planned robbery, sending Osbourne undercover at Costello's club. Gold is delighted to get a tip-off about the raid, only for the robbery to go off ahead of time. Sharpe makes a disturbing discovery about Drummond when his son Alex is arrested for criminal damage. Meanwhile, Gilmore confronts his boyfriend Carl after getting his HIV diagnosis.
| 85 | "Episode 074" "Little White Lies – Part 3" | Jaime Murray, JoAnne Good and Georgina Hale guest star | Steve Finn | Jake Riddell | 23 December 2002 |
Okaro grills Gold over her failed information on the department store robbery. Osbourne is shocked to discover her new girlfriend Melanie is the insider from the robbery, but when she talks about going on the run with her, the relief wonder if Osbourne has gone native. Gold is left remorseful when Tommy Reynolds gives info and she turns him away, only to discover he was telling the truth, and when they raid Marilyn's club, they find her holding Tommy at gunpoint. Bradford is terrified when she is pricked with a needle, but she gets enamoured when Kane shows her sympathy, causing her to make a shocking claim. Sharpe confronts Drummond after her discovery the day before that he is a bigamist. Meanwhile, Young finally processes Rickman's death when Gilmore bails her out over a fee for ruining a wedding dress, and Ashton gets a blast from the past.
| 86 | "Episode 075" "Countdown" | First appearances of Ch Supt Jane Fitzwilliam and Cindy Hunter; Jesse Birdsall guest stars | Penelope Shales | Tom Needham | 31 December 2002 |
Hunter finds himself under pressure from both sides as Meadows orders a series of raids on properties owned by known criminal Ron Gregory, a long term associate of the rogue DS. Okaro is skeptical when a raid on a pub leads nowhere, suspecting someone has tipped the landlord off. Drummond investigates a young boy with a suspiciously expansive collection of high end electrical goods that even his mother can't account for. Nixon is stunned when a prostitute alibis Simon Kitson for one of the River Murders, causing MIT to reopen the case. Nixon is intrigued when she discovers Pat Kitson attended Rickman's funeral, but does she know more than she's letting on? Meanwhile, Ashton tries to distance himself following the reappearance of his estranged father. Young tries to connect with her future father in law, but when he shows up drunk at the station, Gilmore steps in to warn him off.
