= Balawan =

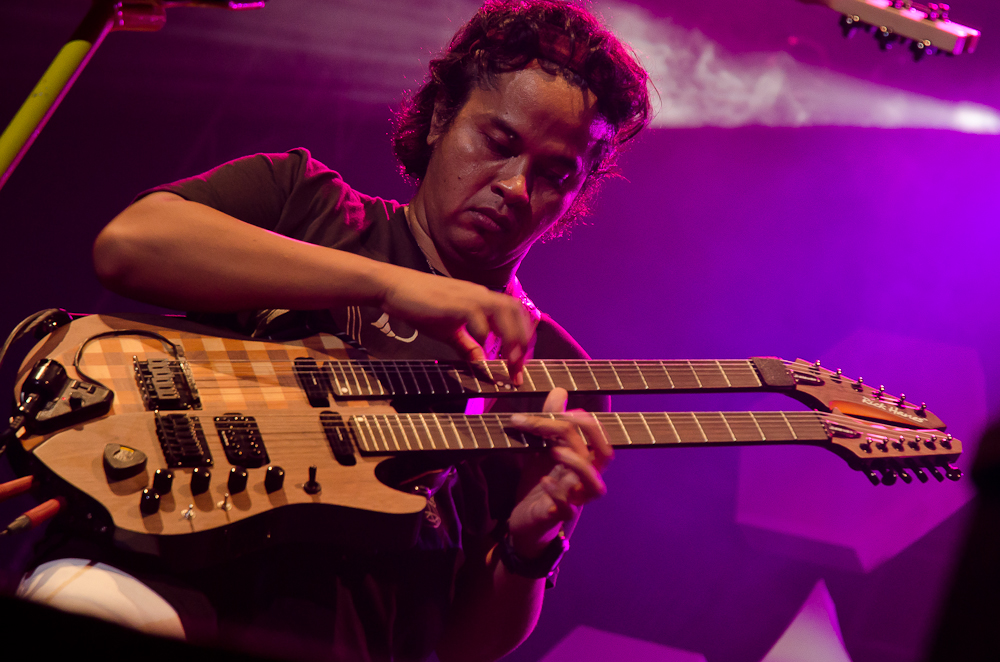
- Balawan in 2012 on double neck guitar

Background information
- Born: I Wayan Balawan; 9 September 1972 (age 53); Gianyar, Bali, Indonesia
- Genres: Jazz rock, hard rock, blues rock, progressive rock
- Instruments: Double neck guitar, guitar, gamelan, bass guitar
- Years active: 1997–present
- Label: Sony BMG
- Website: www.balawan.net

I Wayan Balawan (born 9 September 1972 in Bali), better known by the single name Balawan, is an Indonesian guitarist and songwriter. He is best known for his ability to play double neck guitar. Balawan has developed the 8 Fingers Touch Style technique, which also known as the Touch-Tapping Style. He is often regarded as one of the fastest guitarists in Indonesia. He is also called the Magic Finger guitarist.

== Personal life ==
Balawan listened to Balinese gamelan, a traditional music style from Bali, since birth. At the age of eight he taught himself to play guitar. He joined his first band when he was 14 years old. Although he grew up in a traditional Balinese culture, Balawan played more rock songs than gamelan. Some of his favorite bands were The Scorpions, Deep Purple and The Beatles.

Eventually he became bored with rock music and decided to study jazz at the Australian Institute of Music in Sydney. During his studies towards a Diploma of Music, he was awarded a three-year scholarship. He studied in Sydney for about five years, during which time he also gained popularity for his exceptional talent of playing guitar and jazz music. After he obtained his Diploma of Music in 1997, he went back to Bali and formed a band called Batuan Ethnic Fusion, which combined the traditional Balinese gamelan music with jazz / fusion style.

== Career ==
His first professional band, Batuan Ethnic Fusion, is still active. Besides being a band member, Balawan is also working on his solo career and has released three albums. His first solo album was "Balawan", which released in 1997 by the Acoustic Music Label, a German company. Later, he worked with an Indonesian company, and with his band, he released his first band album, "GloBALIsm", under Chico&Ira production in 1999. Recently Balawan launched his second solo album, "Magic Fingers", under the Sony-BMG Music Indonesia label. Magic Fingers really showcases Balawan's abilities in arranging and composing and his ability to blend modern music with traditional Balinese gamelan.

"It's always exciting to find new things in art and Batuan Ethnic Fusion is a perfect example of artist who explore into the great spectrum in art with passion, love, beauty and freedom..." - Indra Lesmana

As Balawan is considered as the only Indonesian guitarist who able to develop and use the "Touch Tapping" style, he often plays in Germany and Norway. In 2000, Balawan collaborated with many international guitarists at "East Meet West Gitarren Festival Edekoben Germany 2000 Tour". He also has had a tour in 20 cities in Germany in 2001. In the same year, Balawan played at "Hell Blues Festival" in Norway in September. In 2011 Balawan appeared at the 16th Other Minds festival in San Francisco.

== Technique ==
Balawan has developed and expanded a technique called "Touch Tapping" style. The technique enables the guitarist to play two or even three different music progressions at the same time using the same instrument continuously. Another notable player of this technique is Stanley Jordan, an American jazz/fusion guitarist. Balawan developed the same progression with Stanley Jordan, that he is able to produce a piano, bass and guitar at the same time using just one instrument.

Balawan uses all four fingers of his right hand to create the melody progressions and his left hand to create the bass and rhythmic sounds. Another unique thing is that there is no pattern or repetition between the left and right hand, meaning Balawan has a unique way of playing guitar.

Balawan also plays drums, both to fill the tracks on his albums and to develop the "Touch Tapping" style.

== Equipment ==
Since Balawan needs to play rhythmic progression and melody at the same time, he uses a special guitar with two necks made by Tommy Kaihatu that also known as Rick Hanes Guitar. Balawan's Rick Hanes Guitar has a double neck with six strings on both upper neck and lower neck, which utilises MIDI pickups to translate the notes he plays into MIDI notes played via off-board synths and samplers.

Balawan uses Rick Hanes guitars exclusively, which are Balawan Double Neck Series, Balawan Mini Guitar Series and Essel-Balawan Custom Series. He also uses Rockstone Cases and VOX amplifier.

== Discography ==
Solo

- 1999: GloBALIsm
- 2001: Self-titled
- 2005: Magic Fingers
- 2009: See You Soon

Trisum

- 2007: 1st Edition

Bali Guitar Club

- 2008: 1st Anniversary Album
