= Magic Fingers =

Magic fingers, or variants, may refer to:

- Magic Fingers Vibrating Bed, invented by John Houghtaling
- The Magic Finger, a 1962 fantasy story by Roald Dahl

== Music ==
- Magic Fingers (Balawan album), 2005
- Magic Fingers (Chuck Loeb and Andy LaVerne album), 1989
- "Magic Fingers", a song originally from the 1971 soundtrack album for the film 200 Motels by Frank Zappa
- "Magic Fingers", a 1955 single by Eddie Fisher
- "Magic Fingers", a song and reprise in the musical Betty Blue Eyes
- "Magic Fingers", a jazz instrumental song on the 1992 album UFO Tofu by Béla Fleck and the Flecktones
- "Magic Fingers (25¢)", a song on the 1989 album Faultline by Birdsongs of the Mesozoic
- Magic Fingers, a record label produced by Shizzi
- The Magic Fingers, a backing group associated with Frank Bango
- Magic Fingers, a defunct pop band made up of Matt Hollywood, Eric Hedford, and Spike Keating

== Television ==
- "Magic Fingers", an episode of the TV series Pocoyo

== See also ==
- or
- or
