= Alina Kovalenko =

Ukrainian film and television actress, model

- Born: 28 May 1992 (age 33); Vinnytsia, Ukraine
- Occupations: actress; model
- Years active: 2017–present
- Height: 176 cm (5 ft 9 1/2 in)

Alina Mykhailivna Kovalenko (Ukrainian: Аліна Михайлівна Коваленко; born 28 May 1992) is a Ukrainian film and television actress, model.

== Early life and education ==
She was born on 28 May 1992 in Kyiv. She started her career as a model. She starred in several commercials and music videos.

In 2017, she graduated from the Ivan Karpenko-Kary Kiev National University of Theater, Cinema and Television, Faculty of Acting. Alina's debut role in the cinema was the role of Svetlana in the TV series How the Steel Was Tempered. Received great fame thanks to the role of Olga Radzevich in the series of STB The Serf.

== Career ==
In December 2016, Kovalenko she became the main character of the clip of the Ukrainian singer Monatik for his single Eternity. In September 2017, she is starring of official video on Empire of the Sun's song On Our Way Home.

In 2019, Alina Kovalenko played the role of Rosana in the film The Rising Hawk.

== Selected filmography ==
| Year | Title | Role(s) | Notes | Ref. |
|---|---|---|---|---|
| 2018 | The Witches | Dina | TV series | |
| 2018 | Dog | car thief | TV series | |
| 2019 | Trouble for 5 Bucks | Polina | | |
| 2019–2022 | The Serf | Olga Radzevich | TV series (2–3 seasons) | |
| 2019 | Kruty 1918 | Oksana | | |
| 2019 | The Rising Hawk | Rosana | | |
| 2019 | Black Raven | Tsilya, Cheka agent | | |
| 2020 | Ex | Basya | | |
| 2020 | Saga | Yelyzaveta Orlova | TV series | |
| 2023 | Jura Korolevych | in production | | |
