= Citizens (radio series) =

- Genre: Radio drama
- Running time: 25:00
- Country of origin: United Kingdom
- Language: English
- Home station: BBC Radio 4
- Starring: Kate Duchêne; Beverly Hills; Russell Boulter; James MacPherson; Seeta Indrani; Brian Murphy
- Created by: Marilyn Imrie; A.J. Quinn
- Original release: 27 October 1987 – 25 July 1991
- No. of episodes: 338

Citizens is a radio drama series, which aired twice a week from 27 October 1987 to 25 July 1991. There were 338 twenty-five-minute episodes and it was broadcast on BBC Radio 4. It was created by Marilyn Imrie and A.J. Quinn.

The series initially focused on the residents of 5 Limerick Road in the fictional South London borough of Ditcham:

- Landlady Alex Parker (Kate Duchêne), a single parent, originally from Norwich;
- Liverpudlian twins Julia Brennan (Beverly Hills) and Michael Brennan (Russell Boulter);
- merchant banker Hugh Hamilton (James MacPherson) from Kilmarnock;
- doctor Anita Sharma (Seeta Indrani) from Birmingham; and
- Ernest Bond (Brian Murphy), who lived in the ground floor flat with his Siamese cat Salome.

Alex, Julia, Michael, Hugh and Anita had all met as students in Leicester.

In later years, the series increasingly focused on local bar, The Chariots of Fire, and a crime boss played by John Hollis. Alexei Sayle made a guest appearance as himself in late 1989.
