= Kat Gellin =

Norwegian actress and filmmaker

- Born: Katarina Gellin
- Occupation(s): Actress, Filmmaker

Kat Gellin is a Norwegian actress and filmmaker, best known for her roles in The Inbetweeners Movie, gangster comedy film Hackney's Finest, and The Thompsons.

== Life and career ==
Born in Norway, Katarina Gellin began acting at the age of six, when her mother took over a youth theatre group in a village outside of Oslo. By the age of fourteen, she was directing the same group before moving to the United Kingdom aged 18 to attend drama school.

After winning roles in Doctors and Eastenders, Gellin made the move to film playing the role of Donna in The Inbetweeners Movie. She then went on to star in horror film, The Thompsons and Hollyoaks.

In 2015, she appeared as Amanda in the gangster comedy, Hackney's Finest. The film was produced by the Oscar and BAFTA winning company, Framestore.

She plays the role of Kim in the upcoming thriller/drama feature film, Hard Tide, due for release in April 2016.

Her film, Of Her I Dream - which she wrote, directed and starred in - has smashed through the festival circuit in 2015 and 2016, including Aesthetica Short Film Festival, NIFF, and Festival International du Film d'Aubagne

She has cited Anthony Hopkins, Kristen Wiig and Jennifer Lawrence as inspirations.
