= Nathanael Wiseman =

Actor, director, producer & entrepreneur

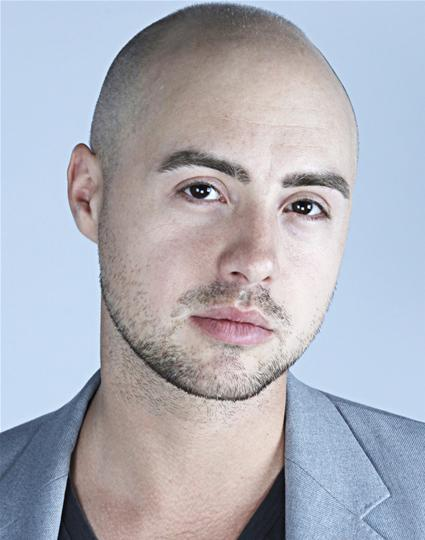
- Born: Nathanael Zachariah Wiseman
- Occupations: Actor, comedian, writer, director
- Years active: 2003 - present

Nathanael Zachariah Wiseman is an actor, film director and producer, and entrepreneur. He is a co-founder and CEO of production company Redeeming Features, which produced the BAFTA-long-listed feature film Hard Tide in the UK.

== Early life and education ==
Nathanael Zachariah Wiseman completed a three-year BA in acting at the East 15 Acting School in Loughton, Essex.

== Career ==
While attending college, Wiseman was allowed to leave slightly early in order to appear in a revival of the Christopher Marlowe play Tamburlaine the Great, staged at the original site of The Rose theatre, located on the South Bank. It was the first production to do so in years. He then went on to appear in various other stage productions before making the move to screen

In 2015, he appeared in the lead role, Cyrus, in gangster comedy Hackney's Finest. The film was produced by Framestore.

He played the lead role of Jake in thriller-drama feature, Hard Tide, released in 2016. Wiseman also wrote and co-directed the film, under the working title My Hero, with Robert Osman.

Wiseman also works as a screenwriter, and has ghost-written and contributed on various feature films and comedy shows. He wrote the screenplay for A Gentleman's War, about cricket legend Douglas Jardine, which was produced by Arclight Films.

He directed the feature-length documentary Ten Count which explores the modern impact of mental health and how it affects those in the spotlight. The film follows the comeback of ex-professional footballer turned professional boxer Leon McKenzie pulling back the curtain on the world of sport and delving into the realities athletes face throughout their life and how it can impact their mental health. Wiseman decided to make the film after the suicide of a close friend. As of 2022 the film was in post-production.

== Redeeming Features ==
Redeeming Features and its sister companies (including Redeem) have produced various ad campaigns, music videos, and promos for artists such as Ellie Golding, Stormzy, Jake Bugg, and Louis Tomlinson.
