= Beverly Hills (actress) =

British actress and presenter

- Born: Frimley, Surrey, England
- Occupations: Actress, TV presenter
- Years active: 1984–present
- Known for: Children's TV CBeebies, CBBC

Beverly Hills is a British actress and television presenter. She is known for her many roles in BBC dramas and in children's TV.

== Career ==
=== Drama ===
From October 1987 to July 1991, Hills played Julia Brennan in BBC Radio 4's drama series Citizens.

Hills has played many roles across the BBC since the early 90s. She has played Kate Warren in Backup, Tina in Knights & Emeralds, Elaine Davies-Johnson in Brookside, Liz Walton in Accused, Monika Gaye in Peak Practice, Shirley Slipman in The Bill, Viv Kelly in Dalziel and Pascoe and she has also appeared in Casualty, Holby City, Silent Witness, New Tricks and Waking the Dead.

=== BBC Schools ===
She started out on the long running BBC Schools series Storytime in 1995. She presented 2 series between 1995 and 1996. In 1997, she played Gina in the Look and Read story, Captain Crimson. In 2003, she appeared in an episode of the long running series Magic Grandad, a BBC schools programme for under-6s, on BBC2.

=== Children's TV ===
Hills has spent a lot of time in children's television, with a career of presenting and writing for Children's BBC. In 2002, Hills become one of the main presenters on the hit CBeebies pre-school series Tikkabilla for which she also wrote. From 2007 to 2010, she regularly appeared in the CBBC sitcom Bear Behaving Badly as the role of 'Postie'. Hills also wrote episodes for the CBeebies pre-school series The Story Makers.

== Filmography ==
Year	Title	Role	Notes
1986	Knights & Emeralds	Melissa	
1989	Dealers	Tape Room Girl	
1995-1996	Storytime	Herself	
2001	Waking the Dead	Gwen Coleman	Burn Out S1:E3&4 as Beverley Hills
2002-2003	Tikkabilla	Herself	CBeebies
2007-2010	Bear Behaving Badly	Postie	CBBC
2015	Hard Tide	Mary	
2015	Twirlywoos	3 episodes	CBeebies
2026	ANDY	Pamela	ANDY - Short Sci-Fi Film on YouTube
