= Golden Opportunity (The Bill) =

- The Bill episode
- Episode no.: Series 18; Episode 19
- Directed by: Steve Finn
- Written by: Declan Croghan
- Original air date: 16 April 2002

Episode chronology
← Previous "A Show of Generosity"	Next → "No Signs of Life"
- The Bill (series 18)

"Golden Opportunity" is an episode of the long-running police procedural television series, The Bill, broadcast on 16 April 2002. The episode is significant in the show's history, as it features the events of the first Sun Hill Fire, which resulted in the death of six officers. The episode attracted 8.6 million viewers, and was the first of the few times computer generated imagery had been used on the show.

With new producer Paul Marquess wanting to change the cast significantly and the station set due to be redeveloped, the decision was made to stage a dramatic explosion and fire on the set, a storyline that led to the axing of eight characters in total during the events of the storyline.

== Prelude ==
- Polly's Depression - The events of the storyline began at the end of the six-part Quinnan storyline, PC Dave Quinnan leaving the show after just over 12 years. His exit storyline saw him go undercover with his former girlfriend, PC Polly Page, posing as husband and wife at a hotel being extorted by a human trafficker. In the fifth part, Dave proposed to Polly after being offered a transfer to SO10; Covert Operations. Polly initially rejected it and Dave applied for the transfer, but when Polly tried to change her mind, Dave turned her down. This left Polly heartbroken, and in the events leading up to the fire, she slipped into a deep depression.
- Race Riot - The events of this storyline began in Loose Cannon (Episode 002), when DS Vik Singh and DC Danny Glaze investigated a series of arson attacks in and around the Jasmine Allen Estate, dominated by Asian families. Vik immediately suspects them to be racially motivated, after an Asian-owned newsagent is attacked twice and several of the homes that are arson attacked belong to Asian families. He attempts to inform DCI Jack Meadows, but Meadows fails to believe his theory. That night, whilst in the pub, Vik is confronted by a pair of White Supremacists, Jeff Simpson (Mark Frost) and Ian Burrows (Danny Nussbaum). The pair taunt him and hurl abuse, with Burrows spitting in Vik's pint. As such, when they leave the pub, Vik catches up with Simpson and savagely attacks him with a piece of wood. Danny manages to step in and stop the attack, but Vik's actions are enough to spark a race war in Sun Hill. With a previously planned Neo-Nazi march about to go ahead through the Jasmine Allen, his timing seems worse than ever. As threats of payback and revenge begin to haul in, and groups of both White and Asian racists begin to litter the streets, Danny realises that Vik's actions are the cause of the recent trouble. Vik realises that Simpson is behind the trouble, and tries to confront him and persuade him to stop, with PC Tony Stamp close to being killed when he was subject to a petrol bomb attack.
- Conway's Death - Superintendent Tom Chandler decided to opt out of a community meeting in order to visit a hotel and have sex with DC Kate Spears. To avoid backlash from the community, he decides to send Chief Inspector Derek Conway to the meeting in his place. The meeting goes successfully, but he is ambushed by a petrol bomber on a motorbike after returning to his panda car, and DC Mickey Webb watches on in horror as the car bursts into flames and explodes, killing Conway instantly. When Mickey and Kate act on information about Simpson's attack, they confront Danny. While Danny fails to confess, Mickey takes his suspicions to DCI Meadows. Meadows finds Vik interviewing Simpson, and has assaulted him once more, causing Simpson to be released. With everyone certain Simpson was guilty, the relief were left furious when Simpson had to be bailed. Meadows laid into Vik and called him weak for taking Simpson's comments seriously, saying that he let the entire team including Conway down, but Vik resigned as Meadows tried to suspend him.
- Des Commits Fraud - In the aftermath of his death, Conway's long-term friend, Inspector Andrew Monroe, organises a memorial fund for Conway's family and encourages the relief to pay a small donation towards his funeral costs. On the day of the collection, however, PC Des Taviner is unable to contribute, having seen his rival and Superintendent Tom Chandler donate £50. Keen not be outshone by his rival, Des believes he has struck gold when he confiscates £200 of drug money from a local youth, and decides to pay £50 towards Conway's fund - claiming he won it on a gambling bet. However, he is astonished when PC Reg Hollis discovers that the notes he gave are counterfeit.
- Station Redevelopment - In Down A Blind Alley (Episode 001), Superintendent Chandler reveals to Chief Inspectors Derek Conway and Jack Meadows that the entire station was due to be redeveloped. The decoration was run by Harry Fullerton (Bryan Murray), who claimed he was once a police officer. Fullerton frequently eavesdropped on important conversation before spreading gossip. Fullerton began feuding with Inspector Andrew Monroe, who had his office moved to a storage room in the yard while his office was redone. Fullerton claimed equipment was being stolen, so began storing it in Monroe's temporary office.

== Episode synopsis ==
Chandler and Monroe brief the oncoming afternoon shift that the proposed Neo-Nazi march through the Jasmine Allen Estate had been cancelled, so a large uniform presence was to be deployed on the estate. Sergeant Craig Gilmore was tasked with running a van full of officers, several of which were left bored quite quickly. When the van came under attack, PC Nick Klein insisted on going after the yobs who attacked them, but Gilmore told them to stay put. Whilst waiting on instructions, Sergeant June Ackland and PC Jim Carver were approached by a young boy who found a hold-all full of riot weapons such as catapults, ball bearings and petrol bombs. In another panda car on the estate, PCs Sam Harker and Cass Rickman were approached by the boy's grandmother who was concerned he had been abducted. The boy was quickly reunited with his grandmother, but when DC Danny Glaze was investigating the theft of collection boxes, he spotted the boy running away with a box. Whilst being chased by Glaze, the boy was hit by Cass and Sam's panda car, but he wasn't seriously harmed.

In CAD, a highly depressed PC Polly Page became unable to cope with the pressure and left the office, but an angry Chandler demanded she get back into gear and ordered her to return to CAD. As Polly returned, police helicopter India 99 called in a group of armed men spotted loitering around an Asian owned warehouse. Chandler ordered Ackland and Carver to enter the area and inspect, but they were quickly ambushed. PCs Des Taviner and Reg Hollis went against orders and took the Area Car over, but when Ackland was abducted by the gang, Chandler and Monroe ordered all units respond. The gang were arrested with Ackland unharmed thanks to Carver, who lost control and assaulted a gang member attacking Ackland, realising he was in love with his long friend.

Chandler decided to stand down the relief as a result, with DCI Jack Meadows inviting uniform to CID. Meadows, along with DCs Mickey Webb & Danny Glaze and PC Cass Rickman headed to the pub, leaving DC Paul Riley and PCs Sam Harker, Di Worrell and Ben Hayward in CID. When the station power went out, Inspector Andrew Monroe left his office to investigate. Des Taviner remained determined to get into the office and retrieve the stolen £50 note from Conway's collection, but as he tried to break in, a petrol bomb landed in the rear yard. As yobs began chucking petrol bombs at the station, TSG arrived to break up the riot. During the riot, a desperately depressed Polly sat in the bathroom attempting a drugs overdose. When a rioter climbs over the wall, Des confronts him and wrestles the bag off his back. The rioter fled, but Des opened the bag and found a petrol bomb. Sensing his chance to get rid of the money in the office, Des smashed the window of Monroe's temporary office and lobbed in the petrol bomb, only to turn and see Sam Harker watching him from the CID balcony. Des quickly inspected the damage and spotted two gas cylinders that decorator Harry Fullerton left in there, and quickly ran back to warn Sam. As the cylinders caught fire, they exploded, causing a massive fireball to rip through half of the station.

== Aftermath ==
- The Deaths - At the beginning of the following episode, Superintendent Chandler revealed that Monroe, Worrell, Hayward and Riley were all killed in the blast. When Reg Hollis visited Des in hospital, he told him of the deaths. Not only was Des horrified that he was a quadruple murderer, but that the only witness was still alive, albeit Sam was critically injured. Polly was found in the burning building but wasn't harmed by the fire, later revealing to PC Tony Stamp and Sergeant June Ackland that she took an overdose, with Ackland demanding Polly go on long-term leave to recover from her depression. DC Mickey Webb was left devastated that close friend and colleague Kate Spears was fighting for her life, and she succumbed to her injuries in hospital. Des began to stand by Sam's bed, along with Sam's best friend Cass Rickman. Cass, who had been blunt with Sam in their last meeting, was determined for him to pull through so she could apologise. When Des contemplated cutting off Sam's life support, he lamented and planned to confess all to his best friend Reg, but Sam ultimately succumbed to his injuries.
- Fullerton's Delusions - Decorator Harry Fullerton was left stunned in the aftermath of the blaze when he realised the blast was sparked by the gas canisters in Monroe's temporary office. He went to Sergeants Craig Gilmore and Matt Boyden and demanded he be arrested for the murders. He was questioned by MIT's Detective Superintendent Susan Devlin and DI Daniel Hayes, but they told him that he couldn't be charged. When he falsely confessed at the funerals for the murdered officers, he was transferred to Barton Street for questioning. When Des tried to stop him by accompanying Fullerton in the transport van, he made comments that led to Fullerton confessing to Conway's murder. The rumour mill went into overdrive, and the relief realised Fullerton was a compulsive liar, and the relief suspected Fullerton could be lying about the fire.
- Des and Danny Join Forces - When Des broke into Harry Fullerton's house to look for evidence, he was stunned to come across DC Danny Glaze. Des knew Fullerton was innocent, while Danny wanted to prove Jeff Simpson was responsible. Des took Simpson on as the number one suspect to turn attention away from himself. After a private investigation, Des came across the bike used in Conway's drive-by petrol bombing, handing the location and Ian Burrows over to MIT. Burrows confessed that he was driving and Simpson was the pillion passenger who murdered Conway, but Simpson had an associate lie to provide an alibi. As PC Tony Stamp cracked the alibi, Des and Danny went on a search with Hayes and Devlin from MIT. Des used the search to plant glass fragments from his boots and a small bottle of petrol to sprinkle on Simpson's clothing. When Hayes and Glaze found the clothing, Simpson was arrested. Des and Danny drove Simpson back to Sun Hill, who began mocking them. Des used this as an opportunity to concoct a false confession, which Danny decided to back up. Simpson was jailed, but after calling Des to visit him, began making threats against Des and his best friend Reg. After being blackmailed by a pair of chancers, Des was convinced it was time to confess, only to realise it wasn't Simpson. However, Simpson put his plan into place, having associates smash up the Area Car as a warning to Des. When he refused to listen, Reg was abducted. Des took over 24 hours to tell management, putting the search in jeopardy. Reg managed to hatch an escape plan just as he was tracked down, and Simpson was arrested for accessory to kidnapping and murder, before deciding to plead guilty to the station firebombing.
- Chandler's Downfall - In the aftermath of the fire, DC Mickey Webb joined forces with DCI Jack Meadows to bring down Tom Chandler, their Superintendent. Chandler had always had problems with Meadows, who survived a CID cull a few years earlier by using his contacts at New Scotland Yard, while Webb wrongfully blamed Chandler for the death of a friend he made whilst undercover with a gang of football hooligans. With Chandler's actions leading to the deaths of Conway and Spears, the latter of whom had been the source of Mickeys infatuation for years. DS Debbie McAllister attempted to further her stagnating career by seducing Chandler, who Meadows had a soft spot for, but that made his determination even greater. Thanks to a tip off from Chandlers old Hendon alumni, Des, the pair eventually discovered Chandler had raped a girl named Louise Marsden during his Hendon days. Despite Chandler discovering their digging and having Webb transferred to Barton Street as a result, Meadows was able to get Webb returned to Sun Hill when Chandler was accused of raping his ex-girlfriend Anne Merrick. Meadows found the allegation flimsy and cultivated Chandlers trust. But after Anne Merrick was found dead at the bottom of a multi story car park, he refused to stick his neck out further, which led to the resumption of their battle of wills. When Chandler's younger brother James came forward as a witness to the Hendon rape, an increasingly desperate Chandler married a pregnant Debbie McAllister, convinced Meadows wouldn't want her caught up in his vendetta. Although Meadows was ready to admit defeat, Webb was not. He remained determined to finish Chandler. He went to CIB with James' statement, behind Meadows's back and couldn't resist taunting his former love rival by gloating about what he had done. Out of moves, Chandler spiralled, leading him to hold McAllister and Meadows hostage before taking his own life in Meadows office.

== Cast ==
Nine regular cast members left the show as a result of the fire and the events leading up to it fire; one of them temporarily:

- Ch. Insp. Derek Conway (Ben Roberts, 1988–2002) - Killed off in Episode 005 - Afternoon Rendezvous
- DS Vik Singh (Raji James, 2000–2002) - Resigned in Episode 006 - Rally the Troops
- Insp. Andrew Monroe (Colin Tarrant, 1990–2002) - Last seen in Episode 008 - Golden Opportunity, death announced in Episode 009 - No Signs of Life
- PC Di Worrell (Jane Wall, 1999–2002) - Last seen in Episode 008 - Golden Opportunity, death announced in Episode 009 - No Signs of Life
- PC Ben Hayward (Ben Peyton, 2000–2002) - Last seen in Episode 008 - Golden Opportunity, death announced in Episode 009 - No Signs of Life
- DC Paul Riley (Gary Grant, 2000–2002) - Last seen in Episode 008 - Golden Opportunity, death announced in Episode 009 - No Signs of Life
- DC Kate Spears (Tania Emery, 2000–2002) - Last seen in Episode 008 - Golden Opportunity, death announced in Episode 009 - No Signs of Life
- PC Polly Page - Went on long-term leave for depression in Episode 009 - No Signs of Life (to account for Lisa Geoghan taking maternity leave)
- PC Sam Harker (Matthew Crompton, 1997–2002) - Died in Episode 010

Several new cast members were introduced as a result of the fire, including one actor returning to the series. All ten new characters were introduced onto the opening credits in Episode 013, despite nine of them not yet appearing on screen:

- DC Eva Sharpe (Diane Parish): Debuted in Episode 012 - At the Deep End
- PC Gary Best (Ciarán Griffiths): Debuted in Episode 020 - Vigilante
- DC Ken Drummond (Russell Floyd): Debuted in Episode 021 - Ruffled Feathers
- Insp. Gina Gold (Roberta Taylor): Debuted in Episode 021 - Ruffled Feathers
- PC Luke Ashton (Scott Neal): Returned in Episode 022 - Prove Your Worth
- TDC Brandon Kane (Pal Aron): Debuted in Episode 022 - Prove Your Worth
- PC Kerry Young (Beth Cordingly): Debuted in Episode 025 - Too Close to The Wind
- DS Phil Hunter (Scott Maslen): Debuted in Episode 029 - First Day Collar
- FDO Roberta Cryer (Moya Brady): Debuted in Episode 033 - Loggerheads
- DS Samantha Nixon (Lisa Maxwell): Debuted in Episode 038 - Tactful Approach
