= The Hunt for Gollum =

2009 fan film by Chris Bouchard

- Directed by: Chris Bouchard
- Screenplay by: Chris Bouchard; Julianne Honey-Mennal; Sabina Sattar; Stuart Price
- Based on: The Lord of the Rings by J. R. R. Tolkien
- Produced by: Chris Bouchard; Brian Lavery; Julianne Honey-Mennal; Gladys San Juan; Spencer Duru
- Starring: Adrian Webster; Arin Alldridge; Patrick O'Connor; Rita Ramnani; Gareth Brough
- Narrated by: Patrick O'Connor
- Cinematography: Chris Child; John-Paul Frazer; Gareth Brough; Mike Ritchie; Neill Phillips; Stein Stie
- Edited by: Lewis Albrow
- Music by: Adam Langston; Andrew Skrabutenas; Chris Bouchard (uncredited)
- Production companies: Rickety Shack Films; Independent Online Cinema
- Distributed by: Independent Online Cinema
- Release date: 3 May 2009
- Running time: 38 minutes
- Country: United Kingdom
- Language: English
- Budget: less than £3,000 (less than US$5,000)

The Hunt for Gollum is a 2009 British fantasy fan film directed, co-written, co-produced, and co-scored by Chris Bouchard. Based on the appendices of J. R. R. Tolkien's 1954–55 work The Lord of the Rings, the film is set in Middle-earth, when the wizard Gandalf the Grey fears that Gollum may reveal information about the One Ring to Sauron. Gandalf sends the ranger Aragorn on a quest to find Gollum. (Note: "3009 Gandalf and Aragorn renew their hunt for Gollum at intervals during the next eight years, searching in the vales of Anduin, Mirkwood, and Rhovanion to the confines of Mordor. At some time during these years Gollum himself ventured into Mordor, and was captured by Sauron. Elrond sends for Arwen, and she returns to Imladris; the Mountains and all lands eastward are becoming dangerous.")

Filming took place in North Wales, Epping Forest, and Hampstead Heath. The film was shot in high definition video, with a budget of £3,000 (equivalent to £4,787 in 2025 or US$5,000, equivalent to $7,503 in 2025). The production is completely unofficial and unauthorized, though Bouchard said he had "reached an understanding" with Tolkien Enterprises in 2009.

The Hunt for Gollum debuted at the Sci-Fi-London film festival and on the Internet, free to view, on 3 May 2009. By 20 October 2009, it had been viewed by 5 million people. Viewings had risen to over 14 million by 2025.

== Plot ==
The film is set during the timespan of The Fellowship of the Ring. It takes place 17 years after Bilbo Baggins's 111th birthday party and just before Frodo Baggins leaves the Shire for Rivendell (an interval not outlined in Jackson's film of that story). The wizard Gandalf fears that Gollum may reveal information about the One Ring to the Dark Lord Sauron, and sends the Ranger Aragorn, heir of Isildur, on a quest to find him.

The story opens with a brief prologue about the ring's disappearance before cutting to Aragorn and Gandalf at an inn (presumably the Prancing Pony) in Bree. Gandalf explains his concerns about Gollum's knowledge of the Ring falling into enemy hands, and asks Aragorn to find him with his tracking skills. After a fruitless search, Aragorn crosses paths with Arithir, a fellow Ranger of the North, who reports rumours about a creature that steals fish from open windows in villages; the film cuts to a scene of Gollum doing just that, and eating his ill-gotten gains atop the roof.

Aragorn encounters and kills a pair of orc scouts in the forest. He soon locates Gollum by a fish pond and captures him in a snare trap. Having secured the whining and protesting Gollum inside a sack, Aragorn sets out for Mirkwood. On the way, he spots a Ringwraith in the woods, but avoids it. Later that day, he is attacked by an orc squad and defeats them, but is hit by a poison dart which takes effect after he kills his last attacker. He collapses beside a patch of Athelas flowers and has a vision of Arwen in Rivendell.

Aragorn regains consciousness at dusk and discovers that Gollum has escaped. He seeks him well into the night, and finds him hiding in a tree. Gollum fearfully explains that a Ringwraith is coming; seconds later, a Ringwraith appears and attacks Aragorn. After a short duel, the Ringwraith flees from a bright light created by the Elves of Mirkwood, who recapture Gollum and guide Aragorn back to their fortress.

The scene cuts to Gandalf emerging from Mirkwood's dungeons after interrogating Gollum. Gandalf tells Aragorn that Gollum knows of Bilbo Baggins and the Shire, and explains that he must now go there to warn Frodo. Aragorn suggests sending Frodo to meet him in Bree, and Gandalf readily agrees. The film ends with Gollum speaking to himself in the dungeon, where he vows to kill "Bagginses" and reclaim his "Precious".

== Cast ==
- Adrian Webster as Aragorn II Elessar, a Dúnedain ranger, the descendant of Isildur, and heir to Gondor's throne. He travels on a journey to find Gollum. Media coverage has noted Webster's resemblance to Viggo Mortensen, who played Aragorn in The Lord of the Rings film trilogy.
- Arin Alldridge as Arithir, a ranger and distant kinsman. He is an original character.
- Patrick O'Connor as Gandalf the Grey, an Istari wizard. Reviewers have noted O'Connor's resemblance to Ian McKellen, who played Gandalf in Jackson's film trilogy.
- Rita Ramnani as Arwen, an elven daughter of Elrond, lord of Rivendell, and Aragorn's true love.
- Gareth Brough voices Gollum, a wretched hobbit-like (Note: Frodo calls Gollum "not so very different from a hobbit once". In the book, however, Sméagol is described as belonging to "hobbit-kind; akin to the fathers of the fathers of the hobbit Stoors" (The Fellowship of the Ring, book 1, ch. 2 "The Shadow of the Past"); Stoors being one of the three kindreds of hobbits. In an appendix, Tolkien calls his relative Déagol (featured in the third film of the trilogy) a Stoor; therefore Sméagol must have been a Stoor himself. In a letter, Tolkien confirms that Gollum was a hobbit (The Letters of J. R. R. Tolkien, #214 to A.C. Nunn, late 1958–early 1959).) monster whose mind was poisoned over centuries by the Ring.

== Production ==
=== Development ===
The screenplay was written by Chris Bouchard with Stuart Price and Lewis Albrow. Rickety Shack Films and Independent Online Cinema handled the production. It was unclear whether the production violated the rights held by the Tolkien Estate and New Line Cinema. Fred von Lohmann, an attorney with the Electronic Frontier Foundation, told National Public Radio that the high quality of the film and its global reach via the internet could potentially create legal issues. Chris Bouchard stated "We got in touch with Tolkien Enterprises and reached an understanding with them that as long as we are completely non-profit then we're okay. We have to be careful not to disrespect their ownership of the intellectual property. They are supportive of the way fans wish to express their enthusiasm."

=== Filming ===
"Bringing Gollum himself to life has been a major challenge, I really didn't want to cop out and knew that seeing Gollum would be an important part of the film. We have used just about every trick in the book to portray Gollum on screen without the full power of Weta Digital behind us!"

— Chris Bouchard on Gollum's production

John-Paul Frazer, Gareth Brough, Mike Ritchie, Neill Phillips, Stein Stie, and Chris Child served as the cinematographers. The Hunt for Gollum had a shooting budget of less than £3,000, spent entirely, according to Bouchard, on costumes, equipment, food, and props. Location filming took place in North Wales, Epping Forest and Hampstead Heath. 160 people volunteered as crew members for the production. The film was produced by Chris Bouchard, assisted by Brian Lavery, Julianne Honey-Mennal, Gladys San Juan, and Spencer Duru. The production design was based on Peter Jackson's Lord of the Rings films. The director and screenwriter Chris Bouchard said, "Peter Jackson's individual look was a big inspiration, it's been an adventure for us to play in that world that he created." Additional writing was by Sabina Sattar, Julianne Honey-Mennal, and Stuart Price. The fight scenes were "a huge technical challenge".

=== Visual effects and audio ===
The visual effects crew was headed by Adam Thomas while Maciej Kuciara supervised the Digital Matte works. Alban Kasikci, Brett Frame, Daren Horley, Dennis Fraser, Corey Butler, Guillaume Benamout, Ismail Kemal Ciftcioglu, Joe Kormendi, Hesam Bani-Eghbal, Kaustav Sinha, Michael James, Nick Marshall, Tiberius Viris and Vladimir Teneslav were the matte painters. With almost 160 people down the crew list the film crew had 60 on visual effects shots for the film over the internet.

The sound mix was completed at the Futureworks studio in Manchester. The composers for The Hunt for Gollum were Adam Langston, Andrew Skrabutenas and Chris Bouchard. The soundtrack has never been released on CD. The soundtrack was released for free music download.

== Release ==
The Hunt for Gollum debuted at the Sci-Fi-London film festival and on the Internet, free to view, on 3 May 2009. By 20 October 2009, it had been viewed by 10 million people. Bouchard states it had had over 15 million views by 2020.

On 10 May 2024, the film was briefly blocked on YouTube when Warner Bros. mistakenly filed a copyright strike request after announcing their own upcoming Andy Serkis-helmed film of the same working title.

The Balticon Film Festival for amateur short films awarded The Hunt for Gollum their Best Live Action award in 2009.

== Reception ==
The film had 3 million views in the first 3 months of release and was well received. It was generally praised for being one of the best made fan films available on the internet. Shortly after its May 2009 release, it became the "fourth most watched release in the US in terms of viewing numbers".

The trailer for the film was well received online. Entertainment Weekly thought the film looked wonderful, and that the filmmakers had succeeded in making a low-budget version of the visuals of Peter Jackson's movie. Wired News said that "The Hunt for Gollum looked exceptional for a fan film. Wired added that fan films often display both zeal and amateurishness, but that the "passionate amateurs" on The Hunt for Gollum had created "something special". On National Public Radio's All Things Considered, Laura Sydell said that the film had the same look as the Hollywood version, with flawless special effects. Rotten Tomatoes wrote that the trailers made it look better than professionally-produced movies like Eragon or Krull".

The Tolkien scholar Robin Anne Reid wrote that "The consensus seems to be that the film is atypical of fan productions because of its professional production values", calling it a "hybrid fan/pro film". The scholar of media Nico Meissner called The Hunt for Gollum one of the first major successes for Internet film distribution, given that it was viewed by more than 12 million people. He ascribed this to the way the film was made and publicized to build an audience, using opinion leaders to spread the word about the film.

== See also ==
- Born of Hope
