= The Rising Hawk =

2019 historical action film

The Rising Hawk: Battle for the Carpathians
- American film poster
- Directed by: John Wynn; Akhtem Seitablayev
- Written by: Rich Ronat; Yaroslav Voytseshek
- Based on: Zakhar Berkut by Ivan Franko
- Produced by: Egor Olesov; John Wynn; Raja Collins; Yuriy Karnovsky; Nathan Moore; Jeff Rice
- Starring: Robert Patrick; Tommy Flanagan; Poppy Drayton; Alex MacNicoll
- Cinematography: Yuriy Korol
- Edited by: John Wynn
- Music by: Josh Atchley
- Production companies: Kinorob; CinemaDay
- Distributed by: Postmodern Postproduction
- Release date: October 10, 2019
- Running time: 125 minutes
- Countries: Ukraine; United States
- Languages: English (original); Ukrainian; Mongolian
- Budget: $5 million
- Box office: $1,531,274

The Rising Hawk: Battle for the Carpathians (Ukrainian: «Захар Беркут», romanized: Zahar Berkut, also called Fall of a Kingdom in the United Kingdom) is a 2019 Ukrainian-American historical action film directed by John Wynn and co-directed by Akhtem Seitablayev. It is based on the historical fiction novella Zakhar Berkut by Ukrainian writer and poet Ivan Franko, taking place in the Carpathians during the 13th-century Mongol invasions. The film premiered on October 10, 2019.

The word berkut is the name for golden eagle, a type of eagle.

== Plot ==
During the 13th century, Zakhar Berkut and his wife Rada lead a group of high-landers in the Carpathian Mountains in a village of Tukhlia, today in Stryi Raion.

Unfortunately, their tranquil existence is soon threatened by Burunda Khan, a powerful Mongolian general who leads his massive armies west in search of new lands to conquer. Forced to protect their village, Zakhar and Rada send their sons, Ivan and Maksym, to ask for help from Tugar Vovk, a wealthy boyar, who has recently arrived from Daniel of Galicia. After his strong-willed daughter, Myroslava and Maksym survive a dangerous encounter together, Tuhar Vovk pledges to defend the villagers against the Mongols. But when a mutual attraction sparks between Myroslava and Maksym, Tugar Vovk forbids them from continuing their relationship. Meanwhile, Burunda Khan faces questions from his warriors about his motivation and military strategy for the impending invasion. As war breaks out, both sides suffer devastating casualties. Redoubling his efforts, Burunda Khan unleashes the full fury of his forces. Faced with certain doom, Maksym and Myroslava must choose to flee or make the ultimate sacrifice to save their people.

== Cast ==
- Alison Doody as Rada
- Andriy Isayenko as Petro
- Alina Kovalenko as Rosana
- Alex MacNicoll as Maksym
- Poppy Drayton as Myroslava
- Erzhan Nurymbet as Merke
- Rocky Myers as Ivan
- Robert Patrick as Zakhar Berkut
- Oliver Trevena as Bohun
- Oleh Voloshchenko as Gard
- Tommy Flanagan as Boyar Tugar

== Reception ==
On Rotten Tomatoes, the film has an aggregate score of 29% based on 2 positive and 5 negative critic reviews.

During the first week, the film collected UAH 13.3 million (148.1 thousand tickets sold).
