= Storytime (TV programme) =

- Genre: Educational
- Presented by: Beverly Hills (1995–96); Julia Booth (1997)
- Starring: John Ringham (1992–93); Siân Reeves (1992–93)
- Country of origin: United Kingdom
- Original language: English
- No. of series: 6
- No. of episodes: 122

Production
- Running time: 15 minutes

Original release
- Network: BBC2
- Release: 23 September 1987 – 1 December 1997

Storytime is a British educational television programme as part of the BBC Schools strand from 23 September 1987 to 1 December 1997. It is aimed at children aged between 2 and 5.

== Episodes ==
=== Series 1 (1987–88) ===
No. overall	No. in series	Title	Original release date
1	1	"The King, the Mice and the Cheese"	23 September 1987
2	2	"Who Chased Away the Goat?"	30 September 1987
3	3	"The Hungry Giant"	7 October 1987
4	4	"Jim and the Beanstalk"	14 October 1987
5	5	"Stone Soup"	21 October 1987
6	6	"Nobody Likes My Spider"	4 November 1987
7	7	"The Glerp"	11 November 1987
8	8	"The Monkeys and the Moon"	18 November 1987
9	9	"Two of Everything"	25 November 1987
10	10	"The Story of Chen Ping"	2 December 1987
11	11	"Footprints"	13 January 1988
12	12	"The Lost Mitten"	20 January 1988
13	13	"The Tiny Doll"	27 January 1988
14	14	"Ma Liang and the Magic Brush"	3 February 1988
15	15	"Foo the Potter"	10 February 1988
16	16	"Patrick"	17 February 1988
17	17	"Mrs. Armitage on Wheels"	2 March 1988
18	18	"The Tiger-Skin Rug"	9 March 1988
19	19	"Johnny-Cake"	16 March 1988
20	20	"Chicken and Egg"	23 March 1988
21	21	"The Magic Birthday Cake"	27 April 1988
22	22	"Five Minutes' Peace"	4 May 1988
23	23	"The Four Friends"	11 May 1988
24	24	"The Elves and the Shoemaker"	18 May 1988
25	25	"Dogger"	25 May 1988
26	26	"Ayu and the Perfect Moon"	8 June 1988
27	27	"Sam and the Box"	15 June 1988
28	28	"Toby the Tug"	22 June 1988

=== Series 2 (1989) ===
No. overall	No. in series	Title	Original release date
29	1	"Hot Hippo"	20 September 1989
30	2	"The Singing Bird"	27 September 1989
31	3	"Tiddalick"	4 October 1989
32	4	"Fin M'Coul: the Giant of Knockmany Hill"	11 October 1989
33	5	"The Wind and the Sun"	18 October 1989
34	6	"Titch: You'll Soon Grow Into Them, Titch"	1 November 1989
35	7	"It's Mine"	8 November 1989
36	8	"Bad Boris and the New Kitten"	15 November 1989
37	9	"Can't You Sleep, Little Bear?"	22 November 1989
38	10	"Nini at Carnival"	29 November 1989

=== Series 3 (1990) ===
No. overall	No. in series	Title	Original release date
39	1	"Mrs. Mopple's Washing Line"	17 January 1990
40	2	"Yes Ma'am"	24 January 1990
41	3	"Dogs!"	31 January 1990
42	4	"Desperate for a Dog"	7 February 1990
43	5	"Brush and Chase"	14 February 1990
44	6	"The Trouble with Dad"	28 February 1990
45	7	"Get Angry!"	7 March 1990
46	8	"Alistair in Outer Space"	14 March 1990
47	9	"Bertie and the Bear"	21 March 1990
48	10	"Goodbye House"	28 March 1990
49	11	"Has Anyone Here Seen William?"	2 May 1990
50	12	"The Very Worst Monster"	9 May 1990
51	13	"The Rajah's Secret"	16 May 1990
52	14	"Two Can Toucan"	23 May 1990
53	15	"Norah's Ark"	6 June 1990
54	16	"The Bear's Water Picnic"	13 June 1990
55	17	"Bear's Shadow"	20 June 1990
56	18	"Tim Mouse Goes Down the Stream"	27 June 1990

=== Series 4 (1992–93) ===
No. overall	No. in series	Title	Original release date
57	1	"I Don't Want To!"	14 September 1992
58	2	"Sunday Boots and Walking Boots"	21 September 1992
59	3	"Frog and the Bird Song"	28 September 1992
60	4	"African Cat and the Mouse"	5 October 1992
61	5	"Big, Bad Barney Bear"	12 October 1992
62	6	"Sari Games"	19 October 1992
63	7	"My Cat Maisie"	2 November 1992
64	8	"Why Can't I Fly?"	9 November 1992
65	9	"The Washerman and the Potter"	16 November 1992
66	10	"Christmas Bear"	23 November 1992
67	11	"The King with Dirty Feet"	11 January 1993
68	12	"Stanley in the Dark"	18 January 1993
69	13	"The Emperor's Leftovers"	25 January 1993
70	14	"Through My Window"	1 February 1993
71	15	"The Happy Hedgehog Band"	8 February 1993
72	16	"Too Much Noise"	22 February 1993
73	17	"Don't Do That"	1 March 1993
74	18	"Scruff"	8 March 1993
75	19	"The Magpie's Nest"	15 March 1993
76	20	"Naughty Daisy"	22 March 1993
77	21	"Beaky"	26 April 1993
78	22	"Big Al"	10 May 1993
79	23	"Along Came Eric"	17 May 1993
80	24	"Boxed In"	24 May 1993
81	25	"Crazy Charlie"	31 May 1993
82	26	"Two Greedy Bears"	7 June 1993
83	27	"Tell Us a Story"	11 June 1993
84	28	"Rainbow Balloon"	14 June 1993

=== Series 5 (1995–96) ===
Several stories featured in this series are repeats from Series 4 (highlighted with an *).

No. overall	No. in series	Title	Original release date
85	1	"Jasper's Beanstalk"	18 September 1995
86	2	"Handa's Surprise / The Little Red Hen"	25 September 1995
87	3	"Sunday Boots and Working Boots*"	2 October 1995
88	4	"Peace at Last"	9 October 1995
89	5	"My Mum and Dad Make Me Laugh / Peedie Peebles' Colour Book"	16 October 1995
90	6	"Why Can't I Fly?*"	30 October 1995
91	7	"The Fish Who Could Wish"	6 November 1995
92	8	"The King with Dirty Feet*"	13 November 1995
93	9	"Sari Games*"	20 November 1995
94	10	"When the Teddy Bears Came / Ten Little Babies"	27 November 1995
95	11	"Jenny's Bear / Where’s My Teddy?"	15 January 1996
96	12	"Where's That Bus? / The Train Ride"	22 January 1996
97	13	"The Emperor's Leftovers* / The Magic Porridge Bowl"	29 January 1996
98	14	"Big Panda, Little Panda"	5 February 1996
99	15	"So Much"	12 February 1996
100	16	"Stanley in the Dark*"	26 February 1996
101	17	"I Want My Dinner"	4 March 1996
102	18	"Naughty Daisy*"	11 March 1996
103	19	"Scruff*"	18 March 1996
104	20	"Henny Penny"	25 March 1996
105	21	"Lullabyhullabaloo!"	15 April 1996
106	22	"Two Greedy Bears* / Cat and Dog"	22 April 1996
107	23	"A New Home for Tiger / Annie and the Tiger"	29 April 1996
108	24	"The Rainbow Balloon* / Lucy’s Picture"	9 May 1996
109	25	"Mr Gumpy's Outing / Sam Vole and his Brothers"	13 May 1996
110	26	"Big, Bad Barney Bear*"	20 May 1996
111	27	"Grandad Pot / Eat Up, Gemma"	3 June 1996
112	28	"Big Al* / Sally and the Limpet"	10 June 1996

=== Series 6 (1997) ===
No. overall	No. in series	Title	Original release date
113	1	"Contrary Mary"	22 September 1997
114	2	"Red Fox Dances / The Gingerbread Man"	29 September 1997
115	3	"Ella and the Rabbit"	6 October 1997
116	4	"I Love Animals / Little Chicken Chicken"	13 October 1997
117	5	"Bet You Can't!"	20 October 1997
118	6	"New Clothes for Alex / The Elves and the Shoemaker"	3 November 1997
119	7	"Dottie / Titch"	10 November 1997
120	8	"Guess How Much I Love You / Dadima’s Games"	17 November 1997
121	9	"Sweetie / The Four Friends and the Elephant"	24 November 1997
122	10	"Don't Put Your Finger in the Jelly, Nelly! / Jojo’s Revenge!"	1 December 1997
