= Knights & Emeralds =

- Directed by: Ian Emes
- Written by: Ian Emes
- Produced by: Raymond Day; Susan Richards
- Starring: Christopher Wild; Beverly Hills; Warren Mitchell; Bill Leadbitter; Rachel Davies; Tracie Bennett
- Cinematography: Richard Greatrex
- Edited by: John Victor-Smith
- Music by: Colin Towns
- Production companies: Enigma Productions; Goldcrest Films
- Distributed by: Warner Bros. Pictures (through Columbia-Cannon-Warner Distributors)
- Release date: 11 October 1986
- Running time: 94 minutes
- Country: United Kingdom
- Language: English

Knights & Emeralds is a 1986 British drama film written and directed by Ian Emes. The film stars Christopher Wild, Beverly Hills, Warren Mitchell, Bill Leadbitter, Rachel Davies and Tracie Bennett. The film was released by Warner Bros. Pictures on 11 October 1986.

== Plot ==
In Wolverhampton two rival marching bands compete, while the teens within them have rivalries of their own, some racial, some sexual.

== Cast ==
- Christopher Wild as Kevin Brimble
- Beverly Hills as Melissa
- Warren Mitchell as Mr Kirkpatrick
- Bill Leadbitter as Enoch
- Rachel Davies as Mrs Fontain
- Tracie Bennett as Tina
- Nadim Sawalha as Bindu
- Tony Milner as Ted
- Patrick Field as Terry
- Maurice Dee as Gary
- David Keyes as Arthur
- Andrew Goodman as Billy
- Shelley Willetts as Dawn
- Simon Taylor as Tom
- Amanda Ellis as Sonya
- Marianne Uden as Charlotte
- Janice Bishop as Maureen
- Carl Jewkes as Dukes
- Stephen C. Page as Basket
- Nicola Garbett as Nessie
- Francesco Marino as Julie
- Fiona Edwards as Sophie
- Helen Daniels as Donna
- Debbie Palmer as Sharon
- Lynne Shaw as Denise
- Vanessa Lee as Maggie
- Amanda Huggins as Sally-Anne
- Clive Wedderburn as Aubrey
- Robert Knight as Onion
- Ruby Hutchinson as Gabby
- Dolly Henry as Jo
- Terry Beaupierre as Sunjoy
- T-Bone Wilson as George
- Sarah-Jane Campbell as Hyacinth
- David Cann as Albert Brimble
- Annette Badland as Daisy
- Rodney Litchfield as Kevin's Dad
- Mary Ordish as Kevin's mother
- David Neilson as Ashby
- Gordon Coulson as Compere

== Box office ==
Goldcrest Films invested £1,113,000 in the film and received £340,000, losing the company £773,000.

== Soundtrack ==
The Music from the Film – Knights & Emeralds

Soundtrack album by Various artists
- Released: 15 September 1986
- Label: 10 Records

The film's accompanying soundtrack, The Music from the Film – Knights & Emeralds, was released by 10 Records on 15 September 1986.

1. "Tell Me Tomorrow" – Princess
2. "Strollin' On" – Maxi Priest
3. "Life of Crime" – Eugenie Arrowsmith
4. "Ready or Not" – Carroll Thompson
5. "Tremblin'" – Mel Smith
6. "We Won't Give In" – Slade
7. "I'm the One Who Really Loves You" – Austin Howard
8. "Wild Wild Party" – Slade
9. "Something Special" – Stephen Duffy and Sandii
10. "Modern Girl" – Rick Astley
11. "Bubble (We Ah Go Bubble)" – Maxi Priest
12. "Stand on the Word" – The Joubert Singers
