= Hard Tide =

- Directed by: Robert Osman; Nathanael Wiseman
- Written by: Robert Osman; Nathanael Wiseman
- Produced by: Katarina Gellin; Nathanael Wiseman
- Starring: Nathanael Wiseman; Mem Ferda; Alexandra Newick; Oliver Stark; Kat Gellin; Beverley Hills; Sean Cronin; Ralph Brown
- Cinematography: Joe Mannion
- Edited by: P. J. Harling
- Music by: Si Begg
- Production company: Redeeming Features
- Distributed by: Netflix; Amazon
- Release date: 25 September 2015 (Raindance Film Festival)
- Running time: 79 minutes
- Country: United Kingdom
- Language: English
- Budget: US$300.000
- Box office: US$1.200.000

Hard Tide is a 2015 British crime drama written and directed by Robert Osman and Nathanael Wiseman. It stars Wiseman as a small-time drug dealer who takes care of an orphaned girl, played by Alexandra Newick, after her father dies in an accident. It premiered at the Raindance Film Festival in September 2015 and was released in April 2016.

== Plot ==
After Jake's father is arrested and goes to jail, Jake inherits his drug business. Although Jake is reluctant to get involved, his friend and roommate Alfie ambitiously plans to expand their empire. While walking home after a drug deal, Jake finds Jade, a young girl, playing alone on a roof. After coaxing her down and making her promise to avoid further trouble, he leaves. After meeting his girlfriend, Kim, he encounters Jade again, this time with her alcoholic father. When Jake objects to his aggressive behavior, Jade's father sucker punches Jake while Jade runs away. Her father threatens to kill him if he interferes again.

When Jake arrives at his council estate, he finds Jade sitting by the entrance and invites her inside. After they watch a television show, Jake takes her home. Seeing her father is unconscious, Jake sends her upstairs while he attempts to wake her father. Although Jake is initially relieved when her father recovers, Jake is forced on the defensive as Jade's dad flies into a rage and attacks him. During the scuffle, Jade's father slips and dies when he hits his head. Panicking, Jake hides her father's death from Jade and takes her back to his apartment, where he puts her to bed. Exhausted, he falls asleep on his couch, missing a date with Kim.

Alfie, Kim, and Kim's friend Leanne arrive at the apartment. Jake attempts to explain to Alfie what happened but is interrupted. After Alfie and Leanne go to his room to have sex, Jake apologises to Kim, only to be interrupted during sex by Jade. Jake says he is taking care of a relative's child; dubious, Kim leaves. In the morning, Alfie is furious to find that Jake has taken in Jade and insists she leave immediately, fearing she could bring interest from social services. Jake promises to get rid of her, but he is in turn frustrated to hear that Alfie has made overtures to Flowers, a psychopath who Jake's father warned him to avoid.

Jake takes Jade with him as he performs drugs deals. Against Jake's orders, she follows him to Flowers' shop. When Jake attempts to back out of the deal Alfie made, Flowers threatens Jade. As Jake and Jade flee, Flowers says Margate is small and has nowhere to hide. When Jake takes Jade back to her house to retrieve her favorite toy, he runs into Mary, Jade's social worker. Jake tell her he is Jade's cousin and babysitting for her father, satisfying her curiosity. Jade eagerly plays along, saying that Jake is a much better guardian than her abusive father. At Jade's urging, the two have a day out at the beach, and Jake treats her to all her favorite activities.

Jake takes her with him to meet up with Leanne, Kim, and Alfie. Leanne and Kim are pleased to see Jade again, but Alfie becomes antagonistic. Alfie tells Jade that ecstasy pills are candy and offers them to her. Horrified, the others are too late to stop Jade from eating it. Kim and Jake take her to the hospital. When Jake steps out to call his father for advice, Flowers kidnaps him at gunpoint and drives him outside town. There, Alfie angrily denounces him, saying he believes Flowers is the only way they can get ahead. Flowers initially makes as if to shoot Jake but instead kills Alfie, calling him too ambitious.

Impressed that Jake has kidnapped a child, Flowers asks Jake to join him. Jake refuses and escapes. Flowers arrives at the hospital first, and after convincing Kim that he is Jade's father, leaves with Jade. Mary meets with Jake and agrees to listen to his side of the story. Although dubious, she recognises Jake wants to help. When they arrive at the hospital, Jake insists on confronting Flowers alone, though he agrees Mary and Kim can call the police if he does not return in ten minutes. At Flowers' shop, Flowers and Jake get into a fight, and Flowers looks as if to kill Jake. Before he can, Flowers' father kills him, commenting that Flowers was not always so evil. After Flowers' father commits suicide, the cops arrive and arrest Jake amid Jade's protests.

== Cast ==
- Nathanael Wiseman as Jake
- Alexandra Newick as Jade
- Mem Ferda as Simon Flowers
- Oliver Stark as Alfie
- Kat Gellin as Kim
- Beverley Hills as Mary
- Veronica Jean-Trickett as Leanne
- Grant Davis as Jake's dad
- Andy Lucas as Old Man Flowers
- Sean Cronin as Terry
- Ralph Brown as Gaz

== Original soundtrack ==
- "When I fall" by Mic Rightious (feat. Daf)
- "Wayfarring stranger" by Si Begg and Nathanael Wiseman

== Release ==
Under its original title My Hero, Hard Tide premiered at the Raindance Film Festival on 25 September 2015. Metrodome retitled it to Hard Tide, and released it theatrically in the UK on 29 April 2016. The movie is available via Netflix, Amazon Prime and Apple TV.

== Reception ==
Rotten Tomatoes, a review aggregator, reports that 100% of five surveyed critics gave the film a positive reviews; the average rating is 6.5/10. Matt Looker of Total Film rated it 4/5 stars and wrote that it is "no less effective as a violent, gritty crimer than it is as a sweet tale of friendship and redemption". Leslie Felperin of The Guardian rated it 3/5 stars and said "Naturalistic performances and a sense of place are the film’s strongest suit, along with a brisk approach to storytelling".
