= Magic Fingers (Balawan album) =

Studio album by Balawan
- Released: 2005
- Genre: Jazz fusion, jazz rock, traditional music, country music
- Label: Sony BMG

Balawan chronology
Balawan (2001)	Magic Fingers (2005)	See You Soon (2009)

Magic Fingers is the third studio album by the Indonesian guitarist Balawan, released in 2005 in Indonesia by Sony BMG.

== History ==
Recorded in 2005, Magic Fingers is a showcase of the Balinese guitarist I Wayan Balawan's ability in arranging, composing and his blending of musical styles, combining guitar playing with the traditional instruments of Bali.

This album contains eleven tracks. The short opening instrumental, "Prelude", is followed by "Magic Reong", an instrumental with two people playing a Balinese reong, believed to be one of the most difficult instruments to play because of the complicated accent and pattern combination. There is also a kecak part as an introduction before Balawan's rocking guitar solos began. The third song is "Semua bisa bilang", a famous Indonesian song in the 1970s. Balawan rearranged this song with European gipsy jazz bossanova styles with accordion and violin, with Balawan's soft singing style reminiscent of Chet Baker. "Sesaat Kau Hadir" is another famous Indonesian hit from the 1980s, rearranged with a mix of many Balinese instruments (gangsa, kendang, cengceng). A famous Balinese traditional song, "The Dances of Janger", with an extra introduction, showcases Balawan guitar playing with two gangsa players, technically a very difficult song to play. "Menanti" is an original Balawan song with bass guitar, Balinese drum, percussion, flute and Balawan's voice. "Mainz in My Mind" has Balawan tapping his guitar, sounding like a pianist. "Arti Kehidupan", originally by Mus Mujiono and written by the famous Indonesian songwriter Oddie Agam, is rearranged with simple guitar, bass guitar, drum and a romantic voice. "Trade wind" is a Brazilian-style instrumental with Balawan's acoustic guitar playing and composition. "Like a Bird" is the only song in English on this album, composed as a modern R'n'B style with a mix of Balinese gamelan instruments. The closing track on this album is "Country Beleganjur" with a Balinese cengceng (similar to cymbals) performed by four people playing a complicated syncopation of Balinese music.

== Track listing ==
No.	Title	Writer(s)	Length
1.	"Prelude"	Balawan	0:55
2.	"Magic Reong"	Balawan & Eamonn Ellis	4:39
3.	"Semua Bisa Bilang"	Charles Hutagalung, Balawan	3:05
4.	"Sesaat kau Hadir"	Utha Likumahua, Balawan	4:58
5.	"The Dance of Janger"	Traditional song	5:47
6.	"Mainz in My Mind"	Balawan	3:40
7.	"Arti Kehidupan"	Mus Mujiono, Balawan	5:06
8.	"Menanti"	Balawan	4:13
9.	"Trade Wind"	Balawan	6:01
10.	"Like A Bird"	Balawan	4:26
11.	"Country Beleganjur"	Balawan	3:54
