= London's Finest =

- Film poster
- Directed by: Chris Bouchard
- Written by: Thorin Seex; Chris Bouchard
- Produced by: Chris Bouchard; Arin Alldridge
- Starring: Nathanael Wiseman; Enoch Frost; Marlon G. Day; Neerja Naik; Rajan Sharma; Sean Cronin; Jeanette Rourke; Arin Alldridge; Malcolm Tomlinson
- Cinematography: Michael Spry; Tom Turley
- Edited by: David Spragg
- Music by: Si Begg
- Distributed by: Trinity Film Entertainment
- Release date: 14 June 2014 (East End Film Festival)
- Running time: 90 minutes
- Country: United Kingdom
- Language: English

London's Finest (originally released as Hackney's Finest) is a 2014 British dark comedy film directed by Chris Bouchard. It stars Nathanael Wiseman as a small-time drug-dealer who gets into big trouble when a corrupt East London cop tries to steal a consignment meant for Welsh-Jamaican Yardies.

== Plot ==
A dirty cop pursues a vendetta against some small time London drug-dealers, who are hiding a shipment of heroin. Sirus and his friends have to sober up to stay alive, with the help of some gun-toting Yardies.

== Cast ==
- Nathanael Wiseman as Sirus
- Enoch Frost as Tony
- Marlon G. Day as B
- Rajan Sharma as Asif
- Neerja Naik as Pari
- Sean Cronin as Delski
- Jeanette Rourke as Jane
- Arin Alldridge as Priestly
- Malcolm Tomlinson as Terence
- Adolfo Espina as Russian thug
