= The Little Mermaid (2018 film) =

2018 film by Chris Bouchard

- Theatrical release poster
- Directed by: Blake Harris; Chris Bouchard
- Written by: Blake Harris
- Based on: "The Little Mermaid" by Hans Christian Andersen
- Produced by: Armando Gutierrez; Robert Molloy
- Starring: William Moseley; Poppy Drayton; Loreto Peralta; Armando Gutierrez; Shirley MacLaine; Claire Crosby
- Cinematography: Neil Oseman
- Edited by: Colleen Halsey; Richard Halsey
- Music by: Jeremy Rubolino
- Distributed by: AMC Theatres
- Release date: August 17, 2018
- Running time: 85 minutes
- Language: English
- Budget: $5 million
- Box office: $4.5 million

The Little Mermaid is a 2018 American live-action fantasy-adventure film inspired by the 1837 Hans Christian Andersen story of the same name. It is directed and written by Blake Harris, co-directed by Chris Bouchard, and produced by Armando Gutierrez and Robert Molloy.

The film was released on August 17, 2018, by AMC Theatres. It received negative reviews from critics and was a box office bomb, grossing only $4.5 million on a budget of $5 million.

== Plot ==
Eloise tells her two granddaughters a version of The Little Mermaid in which a mermaid princess is tricked by a wizard who steals her soul, and forced to live a life away from her ocean home enslaved to the wizard for eternity. When the girls say they do not believe the story is real, their grandmother begins a tale of a girl she knew who met a mermaid.

Cam, a young reporter, writes a letter while his niece, Elle, plays outside. Elle has an undiagnosed condition with no cure. She starts coughing and Cam carries her inside before going to work. His boss assigns him to investigate a man in a circus, Locke, who claims to have mermaid healing water. Cam hopes this water can cure Elle.

Cam and Elle visit the circus in Mississippi, where they meet a mermaid trapped in a glass tank. The next day, Cam questions several people who have taken Locke's mermaid water; none of them have actually been cured of their ailments. After determining conclusively that the healing water is a fraud meant to dupe the gullible, Cam assumes the mermaid is likewise a hoax.

Cam and Elle take a walk in the woods, where they meet the mermaid again. She introduces herself as Elizabeth and explains that she has legs when it is low tide. Back at the circus, Locke holds the vial which contains Elizabeth's soul (which prevents her from leaving him) and Elizabeth abruptly leaves Cam and Elle. Cam sneaks back into the circus and overhears a conversation between Locke and his henchman, Sid. He follows the sound of Elizabeth's singing to her tent before he's found by Locke and Sid and forced to leave. Elle is later kidnapped by Locke, who reveals that she has the heart of a mermaid and intends to use her for his scams.

Thora, a fortune teller with magical powers, and Ulysses, a circus performer who is a skilled fighter, helps Cam rescue Elle, retrieve Elizabeth's soul, and release Elizabeth from her tank. Locke discovers their actions and pursues them. During their escape, Thora and Ulysses reveal that, like Elizabeth, they were tricked by Locke into joining his circus. They head to the ocean, defeating Locke (who reveals to have magical powers of his own) and Sid in the process. Elizabeth regains her soul and heals Elle, telling her that all she needs is a swim when she is feeling sick, as she is part mermaid. Cam and Elizabeth share a farewell kiss before Elizabeth swims away.

Cam files the story, revealing that the mermaid is real, as well as details of Locke's scams and cruelty, skeptical that anyone will believe him; despite this, he is determined to tell the truth.

Eloise finishes this story and begins coughing. She announces it is time for a swim (revealing that she is actually Elle) and goes outside, her surprised granddaughters following behind and seeing her transforming into a mermaid.

== Cast ==
- William Moseley as Cameron "Cam" Harrison, a reporter and Elle's uncle
- Poppy Drayton as Elizabeth, the mermaid
- Loreto Peralta as Elle, Cam's niece
- Armando Gutierrez as Locke, a wizard who has enslaved Elizabeth
- Shirley MacLaine as Eloise, Rose and Lily's grandmother
- Gina Gershon as Peggy Gene, a woman who claims to be cured of madness
- Shanna Collins as Thora, a fortune teller who possesses paranormal powers, including telekinesis and the ability to stop time
- Chris Yong as Ulysses
- Jo Marie Payton as Lorene
- Tom Nowicki as Sid, Locke's main henchman
- Lexy Kolker as Lily, Eloise's granddaughter
- Claire Crosby as Rose, Eloise's granddaughter
- Jared Sandler as Billy Bob
- Hunter Gomez as Johnny "Johnny Boy"
- Antoni Corone as Mr. Coleman

== Production ==
The film was originally titled A Little Mermaid. Filming took place in Savannah, Georgia, in 2016.

== Marketing and release ==
A trailer for the film debuted in March 2017 and generated over 30 million views over two weeks. In May 2017, it was reported that the film had been picked up for distribution by Netflix. On December 1, 2018, the film was released on Netflix.

== Reception ==
On review aggregator website Rotten Tomatoes, the film holds an approval rating of 20% based on five reviews, with an average rating of 4.1/10.

Gary Goldstein of Los Angeles Times wrote:

"Although it’s a serviceable enough story, the script by Blake Harris, who co-directed with Chris Bouchard, is often too earnest and forced to prove sufficiently fun or wondrous."
