= Poppy Drayton =

English actress (born 1991)

- Born: Poppy Gabriella Drayton; 7 June 1991 (age 35); Surrey, England
- Education: ArtsEd
- Occupation: Actress
- Years active: 2012–present
- Spouse: Rory D. Bentley (m. 2025)

Poppy Gabriella Drayton (born 7 June 1991) is an English actress. On television, she is known for her roles in the Hallmark Channel pilot When Calls the Heart (2013), the MTV fantasy series The Shannara Chronicles (2016–2017), and the CW fantasy series Charmed (2019–2022). Her films include The Rising Hawk (2019).

== Early life ==
Drayton graduated from the Arts Educational School in Chiswick.

== Career ==
In 2013, Drayton was cast in her first major role in the Hallmark Channel television movie pilot for When Calls the Heart, in which she played Elizabeth Thatcher (a role that was taken over by Erin Krakow in the subsequent television series). This was followed by a role in the 2013 Downton Abbey Christmas special. Drayton has also done stage work, appearing in The Green Bay Tree at the Jermyn Street Theatre in London in 2014.

In 2014, Drayton was cast as Amberle Elessedil, one of the lead roles in the MTV fantasy drama series The Shannara Chronicles; the series premiered on 5 January 2016. In February 2016, Drayton was cast in the titular role in newly launched MVP Studios' film The Little Mermaid (originally titled A Little Mermaid), an adaptation of the Hans Christian Andersen story.

In 2019, she joined the cast of Charmed as a series regular in the role of Abigael, a mysterious witch, starting with the second season’s third episode.

In 2026, Drayton joined the cast of the ITV crime drama Professor T for its fifth series as Leonie Vass.

== Personal life ==
In August 2025, Drayton married independent film director Rory D. Bentley in a small ceremony.

== Filmography ==
Film roles
Year	Title	Role	Notes
2014	Down Dog	Amy	
2015	Unhallowed Ground	Verity Wickes	
2015	Writers Retreat	Jo	
2018	The Little Mermaid	Elizabeth	
2019	See You Soon	Elise	
2019	The Rising Hawk	Myroslava	
2025	Jingle Bell Heist	Brianna	

Television roles
Year	Title	Role	Notes
2013	When Calls the Heart	Elizabeth Thatcher	Television movie (Hallmark)
2013	Downton Abbey	Madeleine Allsopp	Episode: "The London Season"
2014	Father Brown	Selina McKinley	Episode: "The Ghost in the Machine"
2014	Midsomer Murders	Summer Haleston	Episode: "The Killings of Copenhagen"
2014	Plebs	Cordelia	Episode: "The Phallus"
2016–2017	The Shannara Chronicles	Amberle Elessedil	Main role (season 1); guest role (season 2)
2018	Home by Spring	Loretta Johnson	Television movie (Hallmark)
2019–2022	Charmed	Abigael	Main role (seasons 2–3)
2026	Professor T	Leonie Vass	6 episodes (series 5)

Video game roles
Year	Title	Role	Notes
2017	Dark Souls III	Shira, Knight of Filianore	
