= See You Soon =

2019 romance film

- Film poster
- Directed by: David Mahmoudieh
- Written by: Mike Cestari; Jenia Tanaeva
- Produced by: Jenia Tanaeva; Monella Kaplan
- Starring: Harvey Keitel; Poppy Drayton; Liam McIntyre; Oleg Taktarov; Joe Thomas; Larisa Malevannaya
- Music by: Mark Isham
- Release dates: 25 July 2019 (Russia); 26 July 2019 (United States)
- Running time: 107 min
- Country: United States
- Languages: English; Russian

See You Soon (Russian: До скорой встречи) is a 2019 American-Russian, made-for-television romance film directed by David Mahmoudieh. The film is produced by Jenia Tanaeva, and Monella Kaplan under the banner of eMotion Entertainment. The film stars Harvey Keitel, Poppy Drayton, Liam McIntyre, Oleg Taktarov, Joe Thomas, Carles Puyol and Larisa Malevannaya. After premiering on Russian television, the film was picked up for a US theatrical release.

== Plot ==
US soccer star Ryan Hawkes suffers a career-threatening injury from driving under the influence, ending his World Cup dreams. To escape the media circus around him he boards a luxury cruise ship, where he meets and falls in love with ship employee, Lana, a Russian single mother. After a whirlwind romance at sea, Ryan and Lana go their separate ways - but Lana tells Ryan to meet her in St. Petersburg, Russia at a specific date and time (the start of the famous White Nights) if he still feels the same about her by then. But as fateful events seemingly conspire to keep them apart, Lana's young son Danny may hold the key to their reunion.

== Cast ==
- Liam McIntyre as Ryan Hawkes
- Jenia Tanaeva as Lana Kalinina
- Harvey Keitel as Billy
- Poppy Drayton as Elise
- Oleg Taktarov as Ruslan
- Petr Tereschenko as Danny
- Larisa Malevannaya as Grandma Marina
- Dany D (Daniel Dobre) - as supporting actor

== Release ==
The film premiered on Russian television in early 2019 before rights were acquired for an international theatrical release. The trailer was released in July 2019, which revealed the film release date to be July 26 for the United States.
