= The Bill series 11 =

The Bill
- Series 11
- Series 11 DVD cover
- No. of episodes: 149

Release
- Original network: ITV
- Original release: 5 January – 29 December 1995

Series chronology
- ← Previous; Series 10 Next → Series 12

The eleventh series of The Bill, a British television drama, consists of 149 episodes, broadcast between 5 January and 29 December 1995.

All the major storylines and characters featured in 1995 are reviewed by TV historian Edward Kellett in the book Reaching A Verdict: Reviewing The Bill (1995-1996). On 6 February 2013, the complete series was released on DVD in Australia.

== Cast changes ==
Cast members Jaye Griffiths (DI Johnson) and Martin Marquez (DS Pearce) both left their roles as series regulars, being replaced by Russell Boulter and Billy Murray (DSs Boulton and Beech), with Beech taking the place of DS Chris Deakin after he was promoted to DI. Griffiths would go on to return eight years later for a storyline in 2003, while Marquez returned a year later to make one final appearance as a guest actor.

While not notable at the time, Murray's character Beech would go on to be the show's longest-running full-time villain in the years that followed. Mark Spalding joined the cast as Chief Inspector Paul Stritch, following the exit of Philip Whitchurch as Chief Inspector Philip Cato; however, Spalding left the series before its conclusion after just seven months on the show.

Alan Westaway and Andrea Mason joined as probationary PCs Nick Slater and Debbie Keane, while Mary Jo Randle made a brief return as WDS Jo Morgan in the autumn before her character was killed off in a four-part story arc in which a hitman targeted WPC June Ackland.

=== Arrivals ===
- DS Don Beech (Episode 14–)
- PC Nick Slater (Episode 25–)
- WPC Debbie Keane (Episode 25–)
- Ch Insp Paul Stritch (Episode 33–)
- DS John Boulton (Episode 125–)

=== Departures ===
- DI Sally Johnson (Episode 11) – Forcibly transferred to New Scotland Yard after losing the faith of Ch Insp Conway and DCI Meadows
- Ch Insp Philip Cato (Episode 24) – Resigned after realising he would not be promoted
- DS Danny Pearce (Episode 107) – Transferred to AMIP
- Ch Insp Paul Stritch (Episode 116) – Unexplained

== Episodes ==
| No. in series | Title | Directed by | Written by | Episode notes | Original release date |
|---|---|---|---|---|---|
| 1 | "To Crack a Nut" | Nicholas Mallett | Chris Lang | Sheila Ruskin and Sarah-Jane Potts guest star | 5 January 1995 |
Monroe leads an operation into cracking down on prostitution in the borough. Ackland and Jarvis tackle kerb crawlers, while Quinnan goes undercover as a prostitute's punter in an attempt to gather evidence on the madam of a brothel. However, Boyden suspects that Quinnan may have overstepped the mark and taken a shine to the girl when he tries to protect her from his angry line of questioning during interview.
| 2 | "Hot Stuff" | Robin Sheppard | Candy Denman | Guest appearance of Harry Haines | 6 January 1995 |
Garfield finds a young girl who has suffered from an overdose, but upon arrival at the hospital, discovers she is the third victim of a spate of recent victims. When he finds a fourth boy dead, Haines, now with the Drugs Squad, returns to Sun Hill to help Meadows track down the uncut consignment of heroin brought in from the Far East. Stamp and Quinnan discover a link to a burglary they investigated earlier in the day.
| 3 | "Hit and Miss" | Robin Sheppard | Jo O'Keefe | Ian Cullen and Mark Benton guest star | 10 January 1995 |
Jarvis and Loxton attend the scene of a brawl at the local hospital, only to find the instigator beaten up and robbed. Lines investigates when both the boy and a security guard point the finger at an ex-colleague from his time in uniform. However, with help from Deakin, Lines discovers that the chivalry between the security firm is somewhat dead, and that the prime suspect may have been framed.
| 4 | "Hard Cases" | Martin Hutchings | Katharine Way | Rob Edwards and Jane Hazlegrove guest star | 12 January 1995 |
Meadows and Johnson investigate the murder of a man found badly beaten by the side of the road. The only items which appear to be missing are his wallet and his car. Carver suspects that an old-time villain living in a halfway house just across the road from the murder scene may be responsible, but Johnson suspects that the man's work colleagues are not as clean-cut as they make out.
| 5 | "The Protection Racket" | Nicholas Mallett | Edwin Pearce | — | 13 January 1995 |
Conway is forced to keep an eye on a cowboy security outfit attempting to take over the Bronte estate. Meanwhile, Quinnan and Stamp arrest a young boy for joyriding. Conway orders the boy's release, in an attempt to set a trap for the security firm. However, the boy is then beaten up and ends up in hospital. Meanwhile, Brownlow arrives to discuss a possible merger between Sun Hill and Barton Street.
| 6 | "Crossfire" | Laurence Moody | Fred Kerins | Clara Salaman guest stars | 17 January 1995 |
Woods investigates the assault of a young woman, who is reluctant to reveal the identity of her assailant. Meanwhile, Greig and Croft investigate the burglary of an electrical store and discover the two incidents are connected. With evidence from another witness secured, Woods attempts to use the girl to set a trap to catch her boyfriend – a big-time villain – during a visit to Sun Hill. Notes: Clara Salaman would join the cast as DS Claire Stanton in 1999.
| 7 | "Little Boy Lost" | Keith Boak | Scott Cherry | Melanie Walters guest star | 19 January 1995 |
Greig leads the manhunt when a young boy is taken by his stepfather after his mother refuses the man access. Stamp and Ackland report that they saw the boy earlier that day. When Stamp and Ackland find the boy dead, the stepfather tries to explain that it was purely an accident, with the boy having fallen when he tried to show him the location where he and his father used to go fishing as a child.
| 8 | "Hard Knocks" | Brian Parker | Elizabeth Anne-Wheal | — | 20 January 1995 |
Johnson leads an operation into a pair of muggers who snatch their victims from local shopping precincts, assault them and steal their money. When Marshall is assaulted during an undercover operation to catch them, Johnson finds herself on the receiving end of blame for the incident, giving Deakin his chance to shine by using intelligence to locate a pair of brothers whom he suspects are responsible.
| 9 | "New Management" | Jeremy Silberston | Steve Griffiths | — | 24 January 1995 |
Quinnan is assaulted during the arrest of a bag snatcher, but an intrusive passer-by begins to make the situation worse. Quinnan, however, is unaware that the man is none other than the new Ch Insp of Ops at Barton Street. Cato has a kind word in the Ch Insp's ear about his lack of professionalism, but his abrasive style of management leads to a confrontation with Brownlow.
| 10 | "Powerless" | Paul Unwin | John Harding | Robert Pugh, Maureen Beattie and Daniela Denby-Ashe guest star | 26 January 1995 |
Jarvis and Marshall attend a dispute between a man and his wife over their marital property. However, the feud soon escalates and results in criminal damage to a van and a burglary. Meanwhile, Boyden investigates when a young teenage girl disappears. The cases are soon linked when the missing girl is found to be the feuding husband's new mistress, leading to further arguments between the man and his wife.
| 11 | "Done Is Done" | Alan Bell | Chris Ould | Final regular appearance of DI Sally Johnson; Sean Gilder guest stars | 27 January 1995 |
Deakin leads an operation into a cartel of stolen booze. Meanwhile, Johnson's integrity is being questioned by the top brass, and having shown his clear leadership skills, a decision is made to oust Johnson and instate Deakin as Acting D.I. When Deakin yields a good result following information from his snout, Johnson finds that she has run out of friends at Sun Hill and accepts a transfer.
| 12 | "Getting Even" | David Skynner | Steve Griffiths | DS Chris Deakin is promoted to Acting DI; Terence Beesley guest stars | 31 January 1995 |
Woods and Lines investigate the assault of a solicitor, while Deakin's new role as acting D.I. brings conflict with Monroe and the rest of C.I.D. Deakin offers the prime suspect a deal to gather further information on several fraud cases which the solicitor appears to be involved with. However, again Deakin manages to prove his worth and yields yet another result, despite his initial misgivings. Note: Following her exit in the previous episode, the shot of DI Johnson in the title sequence was replaced by one of Acting DI Deakin
| 13 | "Taking the Blame" | Haldane Duncan | Matthew Wingett | — | 2 February 1995 |
Jarvis blames himself when a teenager is killed in a car crash following his pursuit. Monroe's grilling of the boy leads him to suspect that Jarvis may not be telling the whole truth. However, evidence from the traffic sergeant exonerates Jarvis and gives an entirely different account to what the boy had described during interview. Jarvis considers whether or not to write his witness statement with a little 'creative fiction'.
| 14 | "Expert Witness" | Alan Bell | Simon Frith | First appearance of DS Don Beech; Debra Gillett guest stars | 3 February 1995 |
New arrival D.S. Don Beech proves to be more than a match for Skase as the pair investigate a petrol station robbery. Beech uses Skase's snout for information on the possible assailant who has links to a post office robbery committed two weeks previously. Beech uses a sneaky tactic of attempting to use the suspect's girlfriend catching him in the act with another woman as a way of pulling the suspect out of hiding.
| 15 | "Just Another Caution" | Jonathan Dent | Bob Eaton | — | 7 February 1995 |
Stamp and Page deal with an ex-con who delivers his own kind of justice and public order.
| 16 | "Uncle Bob" | Derek Lister | Scott Cherry | June Page, Oliver Smith and Jeffery Kissoon guest star | 9 February 1995 |
Cryer's exemplary record is threatened when a professional litigant brings a complaint against him for swearing.
| 17 | "Street Life" | Paul Unwin | Rory MacGregor | Sara Stockbridge, Jeffery Kissoon and Michael Troughton guest star | 10 February 1995 |
Brian Elliot, a friend of Acting Superintendent Conway, has been robbed by a prostitute and her accomplice, but does not help the investigation when he refuses to make a formal statement or testify in case his wife finds out about his indiscretion.
| 18 | "A Fighting Chance" | Laurence Moody | Kevin Scouler | Ivan Kaye guest stars | 14 February 1995 |
Marshall and Stamp attend the scene of a violent assault, and Marshall gives chase to a suspect. However, when he confronts her, she is forced to use her baton, and during the struggle, breaks the arm of the suspect. However, when the victim gives her initial first statement, Marshall discovers he may be an innocent man, until he strikes again and the witness reveals the real truth behind the first incident.
| 19 | "Going Home" | Gill Wilkinson | Terry Hodgkinson | Michael Mellinger guest stars | 14 February 1995 |
Garfield and Page investigate when a Greek man is thrown through the window of an empty premises by a violent mugger. As George gives chase, he finds the mugger being beaten at the hands of a local gang, and George is forced to protect him from those seeking revenge. However, the case deepens further when George discovers the frozen body of the Greek man's wife in the freezer in his kebab shop.
| 20 | "High Score" | David Skynner | Jim Hawkins | Nicholas Murchie guest stars | 17 February 1995 |
Deakin and Lines investigate the assault and resulting death of a young schoolboy. They soon discover that the motive behind the attack may be none other than a case of computer crime, involving the copyright infringement of recently released and expensive video games. They use a friend of the deceased to try to identify his attacker, known only as "Steve", who may or may not possibly be the owner of a market stall.
| 21 | "Throwback" | Gill Wilkinson | Peter J. Hammond | Hazel Douglas guest stars | 23 February 1995 |
Woods and Croft investigate a series of vicious robberies on petrol stations. Without any leads, they struggle to make headway until Cryer and Conway reveal some information on some similar offences back in the 80s – but the prime suspect, Darren Pope, has supposedly been dead for years, having fallen in with some nasty villains in Morocco. But can the rumours be believed, and is Darren Pope still alive?
| 22 | "Eyes and Ears" | Peter Barber-Fleming | Michael Jenner | Ian Bartholomew guest stars | 24 February 1995 |
Monroe investigates after a pedestrian is critically injured in a hit-and-run accident. Just about everyone on the Bronte estate bears a grudge against the victim, so Monroe is led to believe that the incident was no accident. However, it transpires that it may have been an accident after all, the fault of a very careless young driver.
| 23 | "Good Housekeeping" | Tom Cotter | J. C. Wilsher | Jenny McCracken guest stars | 28 February 1995 |
Meadows leads an operation attempting to catch a violent burglar, who attacks his elderly victims during the course of his raid. The first night on obbo nets them a small-time thief, and leads Meadows into a clash with Conway when finances threaten to close the operation. Meadows manages to save the operation and CID are drafted out for a second night in an attempt to catch the thug before he strikes again.
| 24 | "Is That the Time?" | Tom Cotter | Steve Griffiths | Final appearance of Ch Insp Philip Cato; Geoffrey Beevers and Robert Daws guest star | 3 March 1995 |
Cato considers his future at Sun Hill after he is turned down for a promotion to area without even being offered an interview. Meanwhile, Boyden and Quinnan deal with an assault involving a leaflet distributor and a warehouse manager, only to discover that the pair have history between them when the former was made redundant after thirty years of service after his failure to move with the times.
| 25 | "New Moves" | Chris Clough | Neil Clarke | First appearances of PCs Nick Slater and Debbie Keane; John McArdle and Stuart Organ guest star | 7 March 1995 |
Probationers Nick Slater and Debbie Keane have differing fortunes on their first day at Sun Hill. Slater is paired with Stamp to track down a disqualified driver, while Keane is paired with Marshall to investigate a domestic assault. However, Slater's lack of patience lands him on a collision course with Monroe before he manages to save the day when he rescues a man attempting to commit suicide.
| 26 | "Flora and Fauna" | Haldane Duncan | Simon Moss | Alex Walkinshaw guest star | 9 March 1995 |
Hollis thinks that Sun Hill could do with a face-lift, and turns his hand to gardening. He and Stamp visit the local garden centre, but are suspicious of an expensive stereo fitted in an old banger. Meanwhile, McCann and Jarvis attend to an abandoned car, which has been picked for scrap, and the two cases soon become entwined. Meanwhile, Hollis' shrubbery becomes a mere plaything for CID. Notes: Alex Walkinshaw would join the cast as PC Dale Smith in 1999.
| 27 | "Loose Cannon" | Simon Meyers | Elizabeth Anne-Wheal | — | 10 March 1995 |
Uniform continue an operation into underage prostitution involving a local diner owner, unaware that Deakin seems to be undermining the entire operation, having had an undercover informant in place the entire time. Fooled into thinking they are assistance on a drugs raid, CID soon discover Deakin's plans, much to the dismay of uniform, unaware that their hard time and effort has all been for nothing.
| 28 | "Count to Ten" | Christopher Hodson | David Hoskins | — | 14 March 1995 |
Ackland looks to Slater for support when she is accused of perverting the course of justice after attending an R.T.A. A witness claims that Ackland, having known the suspect, talked her into claiming that it was not her fault. But when Slater claims that he may have heard something, which backs up the witnesses' story, Loxton isn't too happy over the probationer's lack of loyalty towards his colleague.
| 29 | "Alone" | Jan Sargeant | Jonathan Myerson | Niall Buggy and Terry Molloy guest star | 17 March 1995 |
Deakin and Greig visit an old snout in prison, who claims to have information on a betting shop robbery. However, while they are interviewing him, the robbery takes place, and one man is shot, while the two accomplices are involved in a car accident. As Deakin visits an old friend, he and Greig are held hostage in a nightclub by a desperate gunman who is determined to make good his escape.
| 30 | "Quits" | Keith Boak | Rory MacGregor | Ian Liston guest stars | 21 March 1995 |
Slater attends when a man collapses in the local shopping precinct. However, Stamp and Jarvis seize the opportunity to make light of the situation and fool Slater into believing the man had scabies. Meanwhile, Marshall deals with a troublesome car thief, who as revenge, gets his daughter to lure Stamp into a disused warehouse before launching an attack. With Slater in a radio deadspot, he is unable to assist.
| 31 | "Stopping Time" | Jonathan Dent | Duncan Gould | Penelope Nice and Paul Putner guest star | 23 March 1995 |
Page is called to a disturbance outside a pub, and discovers that it is simply a group of football fans trying to cross the road. As she halts the traffic for them to cross, a maniac comes out of nowhere and runs one of the supporters down. When a busker with a grudge against the police claims Page instructed the man to walk right into the path of the car, she sets out to try to trace the driver to clear her name.
| 32 | "Value for Money" | Peter Barber-Fleming | Maxwell Young | Dominic Brunt guest stars | 24 March 1995 |
Loxton investigates when a stolen TV turns up in the window of a local electrical shop. Loxton has a funny feeling about the owner, and reports the incident to Deakin. When he investigates, Deakin is offered a bribe by the dodgy dealer, who then implies Carver may have taken a bung in the past. Meanwhile, Carver's arrest of a young boy caught in possession of 6,000 packets of Tobacco yields some exciting information.
| 33 | "Little Green Apples" | Nicholas Laughland | Robert Jones | First appearance of Ch Insp Paul Stritch; Timothy Bateson and Jonathan Kydd guest star | 28 March 1995 |
Slater and Stamp pursue a man seen lobbing a dustbin through a window, but Slater's bull-in-a-china-shop routine leads to him taking the man's front door right off the hinges. Forced to wait for a carpenter to repair the door, Slater becomes distracted and the house is robbed while his back is turned. A series of blunders then puts him on a collision course with Stamp and the new Chief Inspector.
| 34 | "Never Too Young" | Chris Lovett | Jonathan Myerson | Carol Harrison guest stars | 30 March 1995 |
Ackland and McCann attend an RTA when a young girl is mowed down in the street. Meanwhile, Woods investigates the hijack of a heavy goods lorry, and Cryer and Hollis attempt to solve the truancy problem for the borough's schools. However, when the three cases unlikely link together, CID and uniform work together to catch a callous thief and his family trying to make a quick buck off a cartel of stolen perfume.
| 35 | "Lost and Found" | Keith Boak | Suj Ahmed | Vincenzo Pellegrino, John Fraser and Renu Setna guest star | 31 March 1995 |
Skase and Woods find themselves an unlikely ally in a dosser who uncovers a buried gun used in a petrol station robbery, and then takes full descriptions of two suspects who turn up looking for it – much to the delight of Deakin, who is determined to nail the pair responsible. Meanwhile, Loxton and Quinnan investigate the assault of a homosexual man who is attacked and robbed by a rent boy.
| 36 | "Hair Trigger" | Derek Lister | Tom Needham | — | 4 April 1995 |
Deakin investigates the fatal shooting of a mother by her teenage son, who claims that the incident was a pure accident, as the gun had a hair trigger, which caused it to go off when the boy backed into a wall. However, with the gun having also been previously used in an armed robbery, Deakin soon realises that the boy's relatives may let him face a murder charge in order for them to get away with their own crimes.
| 37 | "Learning Curve" | Carol Wiseman | Barry Simner | David Schofield, Trevor Cooper and Eric Mason guest star | 7 April 1995 |
Deakin and Carver find their Friday night ebbing away as they tackle a particularly difficult robbery suspect. However, Keane's enthusiasm soon pays dividends and the pair find some buried treasure in a Chinese takeaway. Slater shows his caring nature when he and Garfield accompany a drunk man home; however, his attempt at giving the man relationship advice ends with disastrous results.
| 38 | "Not Just For Christmas" | Chris Lovett | Julian Spilsbury | Basil Moss and Cliff Parisi guest star | 11 April 1995 |
Hollis discovers that dogs are not just for Christmas when he investigates a series of Bull terrier abductions, and discovers that an organised gang are stealing the pets to ransom in exchange for substantial sums of money. Meanwhile, Quinnan and Datta investigate a missing persons case, only to encounter a very irate husband who soon discovers that his wife has cleaned him out of everything he owns.
| 39 | "Swan Song" | Pip Broughton | Lyndon Mallet | Keira Knightley, Pat Roach, Gordon Warnecke and Lois Baxter guest star | 13 April 1995 |
Loxton and McCann attempt to discover why a young girl is so frightened after having committed a robbery. Harris is approached by a flirtatious informant. Meanwhile, Page and Garfield arrest a man for stealing a scarf. However, it's not long before Greig and Ackland arrest the man again on suspicion of a jewellery robbery, unaware that he has been framed by his less than hapless housemate, who is none other than Harris' informant.
| 40 | "In on the Game" | Pip Broughton | Sebastian Secker-Walker | Title sequence updated; Alex Kingston and Andrew Burt guest star | 14 April 1995 |
Boyden and Slater arrest a local businessman caught in the company of a high-class prostitute. Boyden takes a shine to the tom and attempts to secure her as an informant until he is paid a visit by DI Raymond from SO10 – and he discovers that she is an undercover police officer, who is part of a major operation on clamping down on soliciting. Slater learns a few lessons from the sergeant on why patience is a virtue.
| 41 | "Your Witness" | Simon Meyers | David Hoskins | — | 18 April 1995 |
Deakin and Greig investigate a serious assault, but the only witness to the incident is frightened to testify. Unable to promise 24-hour protection, Deakin is forced to apply the pressure in order to get her to testify, but Woods is worried about the woman's safety. When both her car and home become targets in an attempt to prevent her from testifying, Deakin strikes an unlikely deal with the culprit in order to prevent any further incidents.
| 42 | "Life's a Bitch" | David Yates | Chris Ould | Philip Martin Brown guest stars | 21 April 1995 |
Beech and Carver investigate a case of vandalism against a car dealership. Beech's snout informs him that the owner is involved in a long-running dispute with a loanshark, but before he and Carver can make headway, they realise they have been drawn into the middle of a gangland war. However, Beech is sure that the mysterious disappearance of villain Mickey Rates has more to do with the case than meets the eye.
| 43 | "Old Habitats" | Laurence Moody | Neil Clarke | Luisa Bradshaw-White and Linda Bassett guest star | 25 April 1995 |
Ackland and Loxton deal with an assault on a council official, attempting to rehouse some particularly difficult tenants before a tower block is stripped prior to demolition. While Ackland attempts to find a way around the stubborn resident, Loxton speaks to some workmen who have discovered some long-hidden secrets behind a radiator, leading him and Boyden to investigate a case of suspected paedophilia.
| 44 | "Baby Face" | Gwennan Sage | Edwin Pearce | Shaun Curry guest stars | 27 April 1995 |
Page and Marshall find a young boy being assaulted in a derelict house, and suspect that he may have been turning tricks. Meanwhile, Deakin and Greig are investigating a series of vicious robberies on elderly homeowners, and Page is upset to find the young boy's jumper at the scene of the latest attack. However, Page suspects that the young boy's stepfather may be the reason behind his recent behaviour.
| 45 | "Deeds of Mercy" | Brian Parker | J. C. Wilsher | DS Chris Deakin is promoted to DI; Carl Forgione guest stars | 28 April 1995 |
Deakin gambles to win back his rank as detective inspector following an indiscretion with a senior officer's wife. As he heads to his appeal, Beech and Pearce deal with one of his informants who has some top-notch information on a bank robbery. However, their failure to contact the guvnor results in them walking right into the middle of a robbery squad operation, blowing Deakin's chance of a transfer.
| 46 | "Damage" | Audrey Cooke | Peter J. Hammond | — | 2 May 1995 |
Pearce investigates an attempted murder, with the weapon of choice supposedly being a slice of quiche laced with poison. Wishing he had stayed at home in bed, Pearce reluctantly investigates the case and is surprised when lab testing reveals that the quiche was in fact tainted – leading him into a tangled domestic squabble involving man and wife, where the catalyst seems to be the death of their young child.
| 47 | "When Opportunity Knocks" | Laurence Moody | David G. McDonagh | — | 4 May 1995 |
Greig and Skase investigate a series of burglaries committed by a mobile car cleaner, and decide the best way to trap the culprit red handed is to send someone in undercover. Keane poses as a lonely housewife to trap the villain, but struggles to maintain cover when the man takes an unexpected shine to her. Unfortunately for Skase, as he tries to prevent the villain from making an escape, he sacrifices his most prized possession.
| 48 | "Have a Go Hero" | Sarah Harding | Len Collin | Mark Lambert and Julie Peasgood guest star | 5 May 1995 |
Slater and Loxton, while out on patrol, realise that wanted criminal Dougie Bell is back on the plot – but a late night raid organised by Boyden goes belly up when Slater comes face-to-face with Bell – and freezes. Meanwhile, Stamp and Hollis deal with the theft of a bag of crisps, and Cryer attempts to deal with the homeless man accused by persuading him to return home to his loving wife, who has reported him missing.
| 49 | "Memorial" | Laurence Moody | Neil Clarke | — | 9 May 1995 |
Loxton and Marshall pursue a young boy caught smashing up cars with a baseball bat. Meanwhile, Monroe is overseeing the demolition of a high-rise estate, which is provoking mixed reactions from the former residents. Skase attempts to probe a tom for information on a credit card fraudster, and is reluctant to use Keane as back-up for the interview until Keane manages to secure some vital information.
| 50 | "Good Intentions" | Chris Clough | David Ansdell | Annie Hulley and Robert Glenister guest star | 11 May 1995 |
Quinnan and Page respond when a small boy falls from a window, but conflicting stories from the boy's brother and mother leave Monroe to suspect that there is more to the case than first meets the eye. When the boy's brother is caught smashing the windows of the school caretaker, a tangled web of affairs begins to emerge, and it transpires that the boy's fall may have been an accident after all.
| 51 | "Losing Streak" | Martin Hutchings | Edwin Pearce | Jason Watkins guest stars | 12 May 1995 |
Beech and Monroe are at loggerheads following the recovery of the body of a drowned bookmaker from the Thames. Beech suspects that one of his clients, Brian Mackay, has something to hide when he breaks into the dead man's office to steal his client file. However, Monroe is more concerned by the suspicious activity of the man's son-in-law and attempts to bring Beech around to his idea of a motive.
| 52 | "In the Midnight Hour" | Carol Wiseman | Steve Handley | Gawn Grainger, Karen Westwood and Angela Pleasence guest star | 16 May 1995 |
Cryer and Page uncover some painful family secrets when they find a young girl out wandering on her own in the dead of night. They initially discover the girl's older sister is to blame, having left her alone when she went out to meet a friend. However, Page soon suspects that the girl's father may have been beating her and uses the girl's girlfriend in an attempt to get her to reveal the truth.
| 53 | "Never Forget a Face" | Mike Cocker | Simon Frith | Nick Patrick guest stars | 18 May 1995 |
Croft investigates the brutal assault of a prostitute, but reaches for a high-tech solution when the only witness to the attack cannot identify the assailant. Meanwhile, Jarvis is called when a man with a face wound causes a disturbance in a launderette. As he finally catches up with the man and escorts the man back to Sun Hill, it turns out that his victim is none other than the suspect that Croft is hunting in the assault case.
| 54 | "A Quiet Night In" | Nicholas Laughland | Richard Stoneman | Emma Cunniffe, Kay Stonham, David Daker, Jo Kendall and Shirley Stelfox guest star | 19 May 1995 |
Boyden has set the relief a challenge – the team with the most 'points' (obtained depending on the type of arrest) at the end of the shift win a bottle of whisky. Loxton and Hollis are first called to deal with a man refusing to pay in a restaurant, before arresting a young girl for releasing the air out of the tyres of the panda car. However, Boyden attempts to help them on their way by organising a chance meeting between their restaurateur, his wife and his mistress.
| 55 | "Looking After Your Own" | Mike Cocker | Richard Stoneman | Jez Butterworth guest stars | 23 May 1995 |
Ackland is attacked by a drug dealer and ends up in hospital. Her colleagues are determined to see justice done, but Stamp and Quinnan end up overlooking a break in at a local off-licence and a stabbing while in dogged pursuit of her attacker. Stritch tries to keep a keen eye over the relief when news of the incidents reaches his desk, but Monroe is having none of it and is determined to retain control of his relief.
| 56 | "Four Walls" | Dominic Lees | Stephen Plaice | Robin Soans and Mary Healey guest star | 25 May 1995 |
Greig and Croft investigate the theft of a number of personal stereos in a warehouse robbery. Skase's informant comes up trumps when he gives him the name of a local man attempting to sell the stolen goods. However, both Greig and Croft soon realise that all of the parties involved in the robbery have worked together to professionally frame a local gypsy family for the crime, while covering their tracks in the process.
| 57 | "O.T.S." | Nicholas Laughland | David Hoskins | Connie Hyde guest stars | 26 May 1995 |
Cryer, Quinnan and Loxton attempt to prevent a young man from kidnapping his son. However, as they to locate his whereabouts, they find themselves on the doorstep of Kelly Atcherson, a local prostitute whom the man had previously sought solace with. However, as Keane searches her flat, she finds Beech in the tom's bedroom. Is he working undercover or working between the sheets? His indiscretion soon becomes the talk of the station.
| 58 | "Unfamiliar Territory" | Laurence Moody | Simon Moss | Stephen Frost guest stars | 30 May 1995 |
Slater and Keane have differing fortunes on the night shift. Slater arrests a drunk who later locks his son out of the house, resulting in the son finally reaching breaking point. Meanwhile, Keane first tackles two youths who have forced their way into a burger van, but fails to overpower them and is assaulted herself, before tackling an entire gang of armed robbers all by herself when her radio fails to communicate.
| 59 | "Feeling Guilty" | David Yates | Tim Hyndman | Paul Jesson and Charlie Creed-Miles guest star | 1 June 1995 |
Meadows and Deakin investigate the severe beating of a pregnant woman after she is mugged. Serial offender Tony Lawrence has little to say on the matter, but after Meadows convinces his friend, Patrick Christian, to bin his dodgy brief, Christian begins to spill the beans. However, the key to the case comes from a junkie that Slater has arrested for possession, who witnessed the whole incident.
| 60 | "See No Evil" | Douglas Mackinnon | Steve Griffiths | Daniel Ryan guest stars | 2 June 1995 |
Hollis and Jarvis throw a surprise birthday party for Page, and invite all of her friends from the section house. However, a love triangle involving officers at Stafford Row boils over and Hollis is the only witness to a fight between two of their officers. Stritch is determined to prove that police officers are not above the law, and Hollis has an attack of conscience over whether or not to grass on his colleague.
| 61 | "Looking For Justice" | Nicholas Laughland | Roy MacGregor | Dean Harris and Peter Guinness guest star | 6 June 1995 |
Carver deals with a distraught family after a young girl who supposedly caused the death of a relative is allowed to walk free. However, when the girl is subsequently kidnapped by two masked men, the family deny all knowledge. Carver then comes head to head with the CPS official whose decision allowed the girl to walk free, which results in a warning from Conway and further trouble for the already volatile case.
| 62 | "Other Voices" | Brian Parker | Elizabeth Anne-Wheal | Benjamin Whitrow and Maureen O'Brien guest star | 8 June 1995 |
Slater and Keane deal with a violent stabbing at a home for the mentally ill, but their investigation is hampered by hidden loyalties for the homeowner, Joy. Despite their initial thoughts that the person responsible could be another of Joy's houseguests, when the victim regains consciousness, she identifies Joy as her attacker, and Slater and Keane realise they have been pursuing an innocent suspect.
| 63 | "Water Wings" | Chris Clough | Michael Jenner | Andrew McCulloch guest stars | 9 June 1995 |
Slater is on temporary secondment to the river police, and investigates when a member of the local chapter of Hell's Angels goes missing following a brawl on a party boat. McCann tries to convince the man's girlfriend to speak out against other members of the chapter who were harassing the missing man, but it is only when she is violently assaulted does she decide to turn the tables and speak out for her lover.
| 64 | "They All Look the Same" | Audrey Cooke | Maxwell Young | Tyler Butterworth guest stars | 13 June 1995 |
Loxton and Quinnan pursue a failure to stop, but the driver manages to get away and to the safety of his sheltered housing. When Loxton tries to speak to him, he discovers his housemates speak very little English and believe the incident to be an immigration raid. When they finally manage to get the man into interview, Loxton suspects he was not the man driving the car, and is furious at being tricked by an illegal immigrant.
| 65 | "Trying It On" | Sarah Harding | Gregory Evans | David Horovitch guest stars | 15 June 1995 |
Croft and Greig investigate a cat burglar who claims he cannot walk. They team up with a private investigator who has also been pursuing the man in an attempt to obtain the evidence they need to prove he was responsible. Meanwhile, Quinnan fails to turn up for duty, and Jarvis and Hollis suspect he is hung over after a drunken party. However, Cryer is aware of the real reason behind Quinnan's absence.
| 66 | "Better Off Dead" | Dominic Lees | Candy Denman | — | 16 June 1995 |
Ackland and Slater try to find out why a little girl is wandering the streets late at night. When they finally manage to reach her home, they find her mother has been beaten and strangled. Meanwhile, Stamp and Keane deal with an attempted suicide. However, it soon transpires that their victim is in fact the father of the young girl, and is responsible for the mother's death. Keane becomes trapped when trying to arrest him.
| 67 | "Today and Tomorrow" | Gill Wilkinson | Sheila Duncan | Ross McCall and Mark Letheren guest star | 20 June 1995 |
Pearce and Deakin clash over conflicting information from their respective informants when both of them attempt to trap a gangleader dealing heroin. While Pearce's latest informant, the Black Falcon, leads him right up the garden path, Deakin's information is paying off – until new information from Pearce's informant leads him and Deakin to an abandoned warehouse, where Deakin finds the lifeless body of his informant.
| 68 | "Upstairs, Downstairs" | A.J. Quinn | Barry Simner | Razaaq Adoti guest stars | 22 June 1995 |
Stritch goes out on the beat with Garfield, and the pair attend to a young man with mental difficulties who has been making nuisance calls to the ambulance service. However, before his nurse is able to come to support him, he breaks into his parents' house and locks himself in the bathroom. Meanwhile, Stamp and Slater find themselves picking out some new shrubbery for Slater's room at the section house.
| 69 | "Bedside Manner" | John Bruce | Carolyn Sally Jones | Carol Hawkins guest stars | 23 June 1995 |
Pearce and Woods are in pursuit of a burglary suspect who is caught after snagging his jacket on some barbed wire. However, once in custody, his injuries don't appear to match the incident, but Pearce ignores the advice of the new F.M.E. and persuades her to let him continue with the interview. However, when the prisoner collapses in custody, the F.M.E. lodges a complaint against Pearce for forcing her to change her opinion.
| 70 | "Who Cares?" | Martin Hutchings | Mark Holloway | Maurice Denham and Kenneth Colley guest star | 27 June 1995 |
Keane and Cryer investigate when an escaped dog causes a road traffic accident. Keane finds the dog's owner, an elderly gentleman, knocked black and blue on his living room floor. He claims that his injuries where sustained during a fall, but Cryer isn't so sure, and suspects the man's son, who lives with him, may be abusing his father. After the elderly man trashes an estate agent, the truth about the abuse is uncovered.
| 71 | "Kicking" | Gwennan Sage | Mark Holloway | Rosie Marcel and David Harewood guest star | 29 June 1995 |
Jarvis and Page investigate the death of a martial arts student who died from a brain haemorrhage. Initially, the instructor of the class claims that the boy's brother was responsible, after delivering a particularly difficult tackle during a role-play situation. However, the boy's brother claims the instructor is the responsible party, after the pair had a row over the instructor's current girlfriend.
| 72 | "Big Hitters" | Peter Barber-Fleming | Neil Clarke | Dicken Ashworth guest stars | 30 June 1995 |
Croft is furious when a violent thug wanted for an assault on a young market trader walks free. Beech offers to help investigate the case. As they discover that a second young boy has been assaulted, Beech comes up with a cunning plan to get the attacker to reveal his guilt – but Croft is uncomfortable with his methods. Beech and Carver watch on as the father of the first young victim beats seven bells out of the attacker.
| 73 | "Picking up the Pieces" | Ken Horn | Nicholas McInerny | Trevor Byfield and Roy Heather guest star | 4 July 1995 |
Cryer investigates when a disturbed young man comes into the station claiming to have assaulted someone. A search of local hospitals finds a victim with injuries similar to those described by the young man, but the victim claims to be a friend of the young man, who, he says, is not responsible for his injuries. Cryer investigates the owner of a hostel who appears to be more involved than he has admitted to being.
| 74 | "Big Boy's Rules" | Peter Barber-Fleming | Julian Spilsbury | David Graham and Jeff Nuttall guest star | 6 July 1995 |
Carver and Skase look into the hijacking of a lorry, but soon realise that their investigation is being overshadowed by a violent gang attempting to retrieve some valuable goods stashed inside one of the boxes of stolen cargo. With witnesses being beaten and intimidated at every turn, their only hope of glory lies in the hands of a frightened shopkeeper who has unwittingly bought the precious item wanted by the gang.
| 75 | "Woman of Substance" | Ken Horn | Peter Gibbs | Tony Guilfoyle and Ruth Gemmell guest star | 7 July 1995 |
Datta and Jarvis try to track down a missing girl whose mother fears she has been kidnapped. Datta initially suspects the mother may be fabricating stories about the child's supposed abduction, but later realises that her fears are totally unfounded. Suspecting that the young girl may have wandered off with her elderly minder, Betty, Datta and Jarvis manage to track them down at a local park, only to find Betty has died.
| 76 | "With Friends Like These" | Paul Unwin | Maxwell Young | Mark Addy guest stars | 11 July 1995 |
Monroe holds an ID parade for two witnesses in a child abduction case, but only the secondary witness, who places the suspect in the area but not at the scene, can identify her. However, in interview, the suspect mistakenly believes that Jarvis and Ackland have said that she was identified by the chief witness – a technicality which leaves Pearce furious and a child abductor loose on the streets of Sun Hill.
| 77 | "No Choice" | Paul Unwin | Tom Needham | Michelle Fairley guest stars | 13 July 1995 |
Ackland and Garfield become involved in an unusual case of life and death when they arrest a woman following a bag theft. After giving several false aliases, they discover that she has emigrated from Belfast in an attempt to have a secret abortion without her husband's knowledge. Garfield is sure that the woman is spinning them a line, but Ackland is prepared to give her the benefit of the doubt. But are her intentions true?
| 78 | "The Lives of Brian" | David Richards | David Hoskins | Ken Stott guest stars | 14 July 1995 |
Garfield and Marshall have to decide if a suspect is an innocent philanderer or a ruthless criminal when they investigate the disappearance of £4,000 from a safe on a building site. When they find the suspect in possession of a number of fake driving licences, they suspect that it is not the first time that he has committed such a crime – and true to form, when they discover his real name, they find a string of offences to go with it.
| 79 | "Skin Deep" | Robin Sheppard | Simon Frith | Burt Caesar guest stars | 18 July 1995 |
McCann finds himself in the frame for robbery when a police baton with his call sign is found at the scene of a robbery in a jewellery store. A young black youth with a grudge and a family of racists both have reason to set him up, but both claim to be innocent of the crime. The young man's girlfriend, however, tells a different story – until Greig and Woods discover that the young man may have been set up as well.
| 80 | "Kid" | David Skynner | Mark Holloway | Simon Merrells guest stars | 20 July 1995 |
Deakin and Woods try to persuade a desperate mother – and wife of a seriously dangerous villain – to trust them when her young daughter is kidnapped as a result of her son's drug habit. As the mother stands in place of her son at the agreed meet, Deakin is suspicious when the kidnapper refuses to reveal the location of the victim even after the money has been handed over – although she is later found alive and well.
| 81 | "A Bird in the Hand" | Simon Meyers | Tom Needham | Albert Welling and Paul Barber guest star | 21 July 1995 |
Meadows and Woods have their eyes on one of Sun Hill's most wanted when they investigate a double rape. As they suspect, they find clothing matching the description of the suspect in their prime target's gym locker, but are surprised when while he is in custody, someone telephones the local radio station – and then CAD – to claim that they are responsible for the brutal attacks, leaving Meadows and Woods back at square one.
| 82 | "Over the Top" | David Skynner | Bob Eaton | Neil Maskell and Ameet Chana guest star | 25 July 1995 |
Loxton and Keane investigate a gang of youths who are terrorising a housing estate. Firstly, they investigate the robbery of a local corner shop, where the owner was threatened with a knife, and then the brutal assault of a bookmaker, who dies in hospital of his injuries. Loxton suspects a pair of local brothers, but Keane realises that the only way they can be caught is through evidence provided by one of their girlfriends.
| 83 | "Body Beautiful" | Jonathan Dent | James Stevenson | Lesley Vickerage and Mark Arden guest star | 27 July 1995 |
Croft and Skase get a free workout when they go undercover in a gym to catch a steroids dealer. Skase's attempt at casually moving up the food chain ends in disaster when the dealer smells a rat, so Croft, against the wishes of Datta, who had been investigating the dealer for beating his wife, visits her and uses details of the dealer's affair with a gym buddy as leverage to find out who has been supplying him the goods.
| 84 | "What the Eye Doesn't See" | Baz Taylor | Ray Brooking | Claire Goose guest stars | 28 July 1995 |
Beech investigates a series of jewellery robberies. Meanwhile, Loxton and Quinnan deal with a frightened young man who has been the subject of an attack at a local car lot. However, the attack proves to be the link that Beech needs to put the spotlight on his prime suspect. Croft and Lines are dismayed by Beech's methods when he sets up an innocent victim for a beating in order to uncover the location of the assailant.
| 85 | "In Control" | Jonathan Dent | Matthew Wingett | Jim McManus guest stars | 1 August 1995 |
Marshall and Slater clash over how to handle an assault victim with drugs in her flat and a suspicious history. When she claims her latest boyfriend is responsible for selling her the drugs, Marshall believes she is telling the truth, but Slater is more sceptical. A raid on his flat fails to provide any evidence, but Marshall is astonished when Deakin finds a large supply hidden beneath the bath of the assault victim.
| 86 | "Presumed Guilty" | Nicholas Mallett | David Hoskins | Karen Henthorn and Amanda Drew guest star | 3 August 1995 |
Meadows and Deakin are on the trail of a serial rapist when a blood sample from a recent burglary proves to have the same DNA as the rapist. Having previously arrested professional burglar Colin Price for the break-in, Meadows and Deakin believe they have their man – until they discover that the burglar had a fight with a male homeowner – and they realise their chief witness hasn't been giving them the full picture.
| 87 | "Under the Doctor" | Mike Cocker | Simon Moss | Susannah Corbett guest stars | 4 August 1995 |
Quinnan and Jarvis investigate when they find a young man in possession of some lethal Class B drugs which he claims were prescribed to him for slimming. They decide to mount an undercover operation to catch a fraudulent doctor at a slimming clinic, but need a WPC for help. Dare they imply that Page or Keane are overweight? Keane goes undercover, but discovers that the doctor is interested in more than just his patients' weight.
| 88 | "Ritual" | Brian Farnham | Peter J. Hammond | Denys Hawthorne guest stars | 8 August 1995 |
Deakin and Croft investigate when the mummified body of a baby is found in an old allotment shed. They initially suspect the last occupier of the plot, but soon discover that he died some years ago. However, when the post mortem reveals the remains are over forty years old, their investigation points towards the Coney family, who are less than happy with having to dig up painful memories from the past.
| 89 | "Whipping Boy" | Danny Hiller | Graham White | — | 10 August 1995 |
Keane confronts some youths fighting in an underpass, but they all claim that they were play-fighting and have committed no crime. The next morning Loxton and Hollis are called to the scene of a suspicious death, and discover that the deceased is one of the youths from the night before. Lines discovers that a school bully he investigated some years before is still up to his old tricks, and wonders if he has now committed murder.
| 90 | "The Devil You Don't Know" | Jeremy Silberston | Steve Handley | Roy Skelton, Sharon Small and Lesley Nicol guest star | 11 August 1995 |
Datta comforts the girlfriend of a violent drug user following a very deserted funeral, but unexpectedly finds herself caught in a tight spot when the woman chooses to provide information on a series of armed robberies, before naming a highly-dangerous dealer on the Jasmine Allen estate. Meanwhile, Garfield and Keane deal with a young girl seen attempting to break into a house, but discover that her problems don't end there.
| 91 | "Normal Behaviour" | Chris Lovett | Graham Mitchell | — | 15 August 1995 |
Greig and Croft investigate when an elderly homeowner is attacked and robbed after returning home from holiday. Her description of the suspect matches local thug Liam Bowen, but Bowen's mother provides him with an alibi for the time of the attack. Later, the home of a school caretaker is ransacked and damaged, and Greig and Croft discover that the school is once again connected to none other than Liam Bowen.
| 92 | "Charity and Beating" | Danny Hiller | Richard Stoneman | Lucy Davis guest stars | 17 August 1995 |
Hollis arrests a homeless youth for stealing a bag of clothes from outside a charity shop, leaving his colleagues wondering at his new approach. Hollis struggles to find a motive for the theft until a drug addict that Jarvis and Loxton have arrested names the youth as her crack dealer. However, the case takes an interesting turn when Hollis discovers that the missing item in the bag of clothes was not drugs – but a handgun.
| 93 | "Nearest and Dearest" | Brian Farnham | Duncan Gould | Colin Buchanan guest stars | 18 August 1995 |
Keane and Cryer investigate the suspicious death of an elderly homeowner who is found having fallen down a flight of stairs – despite being unable to ascend them in the first place. They soon discover that a local chiropodist who has been privately helping out his elderly patients, with the help of their home carer, has been defrauding them by selling off valuable furniture and pocketing the proceeds.
| 94 | "Mother's Ruin" | Derek Lister | Isabelle Grey | Idris Elba guest stars | 22 August 1995 |
Boyden finds out that he has a daughter – and so does Beech.
| 95 | "Russian Doll" | James Cellan Jones | Sebastian Secker-Walker | — | 24 August 1995 |
Marshall and Slater investigate when a builder reports a terrible smell coming from a basement. They find the body of a local estate agent who told his employees he was going on holiday. Suicide is initially suspected, but when the cause of death is revealed as murder, Croft and Deakin investigate some interesting links between the deceased and a group of Russians who were privately leasing properties from him.
| 96 | "Mitigating Circumstances" | Nicholas Laughland | Suj Ahmed | Ray Winstone and Nigel Lindsay guest star | 25 August 1995 |
Meadows finally gets the chance to catch an old adversary when Stamp and Jarvis find the badly beaten body of gangster Peter Robinson in the boot of a car in a crusher's yard. However, when the man makes a full confession, Meadows is sure that he is spinning him a line. Meanwhile, Ackland deals with a young shoplifter, who after initially refusing to speak, makes allegations of abuse against the manager of a local children's home.
| 97 | "Now and Then" | Derek Lister | John Brennan | Scott Neal guest stars | 29 August 1995 |
Ackland leads a raid on a taxi rank, convinced that a former prostitute arrested for drug dealing is protecting a higher player in the food chain, Danny Gibson. However, the raid only yields a small amount of cannabis, until Quinnan and Garfield corner a young boy trying to escape, who is found with several wraps of crack cocaine. But when Gibson eventually surfaces, the tangled web of lies becomes even more complicated. Notes: Scott Neal would join the cast as PC Luke Ashton in 1997.
| 98 | "Three in a Bed" | A.J. Quinn | Chris Ould | — | 31 August 1995 |
Boyden and Beech lock horns when an off-duty police officer is arrested for drink-driving by Jarvis, who was unaware of his identity at the time. Beech tries to convince Boyden to fix the blood sample to prevent the officer from being disciplined, but when Monroe recognises the suspect in custody, Boyden has no choice but to play the situation by the book, leaving Beech in the middle of a very difficult situation.
| 99 | "The Writing on the Wall" | A.J. Quinn | Mark Holloway | — | 1 September 1995 |
Beech investigates a series of handbag thefts from cars, but is angered when Skase fails to pursue the chief suspect, instead choosing to hold his small-time accomplice. Meanwhile, Hollis is determined to find out who is responsible for the outbreak of graffiti that has appeared about him on the toilet walls overnight, and despite his initial thoughts that one of his colleagues may be responsible, soon discovers an elaborate overtime scam involving a dodgy cleaner.
| 100 | "Too Clever by Half" | Simon Meyers | Steve Griffiths | David Sibley guest stars | 5 September 1995 |
Carver goes undercover as a barman to expose an extortion racket, where the owner of a pub is being blackmailed into handing over cash in order to prevent any trouble. However, the operation nearly goes awry when an unknowing Beech arrives at the pub to meet with one of his informants. When Carver's cover is blown, Beech becomes prime suspect for giving the nod to the gang – until CID discover the landlord's wife has been in bed with the gang leader.
| 101 | "Heat" | Gill Wilkinson | Elizabeth-Anne Wheal | Owen Aaronovitch, Sam Kelly and Andrew Lancel guest star | 7 September 1995 |
Greig and Skase investigate a possible arson attack after a fire burns down a block of flats, killing a young family. Initially, the two seats of fire appear to suggest a deliberate attack, but when the father of the young children reveals they had been without power and were lighting fires to stay warm, Greig and Skase's attention is turned to the dodgy landlord, who they are determined to nail for involuntary manslaughter and neglect of duty.
| 102 | "Still Waters" | Baz Taylor | J. C. Wilsher | Hans Matheson guest stars | 8 September 1995 |
Conway enlists Carver and his chums from the local Scuba Diving club to help clean up a dock which has been a regular fly-tipping spot. However, during their expedition, one of Carver's friends finds a corpse. Meanwhile, Deakin and Lines are on the trail of one of Deakin's snouts, who has gone missing. When they hear of Carver's find, they have a suspect in mind, before the body is even retrieved. But could the death be an entirely innocent matter?
| 103 | "All in the Game" | Nicholas Mallett | Edwin Pearce | Michael Attwell and Roy North guest star | 12 September 1995 |
Beech and Carver investigate the hit-and-run of a young football star, and initially suspect a rival agent may be responsible for the attack. However, with many differing stories from those involved, they soon discover that the real culprit may in fact be the man's own girlfriend. Meanwhile, Skase is left in the lurch by Beech to deal with an old robbery case, but soon discovers the two cases they have been working on may be linked.
| 104 | "Sins of the Father" | Robin Sheppard | Carole Forbes | — | 14 September 1995 |
Quinnan and Page investigate when a man is assaulted by his 12-year-old daughter, having been convinced into speaking out by her shady uncle. However, a tangled web of lies begins to unravel when stories about both men prove to be untrue, and that the vengeance between them is the result of an old post office robbery which the pair pulled off, and a subsequent car accident which left one of the men paralysed.
| 105 | "Night Beat" | John Bruce | Chris Lang | — | 15 September 1995 |
Cryer is taken hostage at gunpoint by an aggrieved husband who has decided to take drastic action over a custody case. After accidentally firing the gun at his ex-wife, Cryer is then forced to make a difficult decision – save the victim and allow the man to commit suicide or risk the woman's life to prevent him from doing so. Meanwhile, with the canteen staff off for the night, Hollis takes his task of cooking meals for the prisoners a little too far.
| 106 | "Balancing the Scales" | Chris Lovett | Julian Perkins | Charlie Condou and David Quilter guest star | 19 September 1995 |
Quinnan and Hollis investigate when a store detective renowned for his bravery is accused of assaulting a shoplifter. Although the man initially admits to the crime, following a quiet word with Beech, he soon changes his story. However, despite their anger at the sergeant for his unwanted interference, they soon discover the case is not an isolated incident, and soon discover a series of assaults on frightened shoplifters.
| 107 | "For Services Rendered" | Mike Cocker | Jonathan Myerson | Final regular appearance of DS Danny Pearce | 21 September 1995 |
Pearce learns that his transfer out of Sun Hill has been approved, but takes on one last case where he investigates a man being blackmailed by an escort agency. Meanwhile, Datta is accompanying a former tom to court for a custody hearing. However, when Pearce learns the two cases are connected, he uses leverage to collect evidence against the agency manager, unwittingly taking down Greig's snout in the process.
| 108 | "Response Time" | Jeremy Silberston | Elizabeth-Anne Wheal | Davyd Harries guest stars | 22 September 1995 |
Stritch and Monroe clash over a series of new timekeeping 'exercises' being implemented to improve response times. Meanwhile, Loxton and Slater manage to catch up with a group of racist attackers whom CID are desperate to nail. As they give chase into a derelict building, Loxton becomes involved in a fight with one of the suspects, who steps through an open door and falls to his death. Stritch soon finds the relief laying the blame firmly at his door.
| 109 | "Knowing the Score (Part 1)" | Laurence Moody | Margaret Phelan | Return of WDS Jo Morgan; Meera Syal, Martin Reeve, Rob Jarvis, Rowena Cooper and Moya Brady guest star | 26 September 1995 |
Deakin and Woods are in court for the trial of a dangerous drug dealer, Benji White, with assistance from former Sun Hill alumni Jo Morgan – now working for the regional crime squad. However, the case soon begins to fall apart, with missing statements and absent witnesses. Meanwhile, McCann builds a bond with a young boy who is arrested after his social worker asks him to press charges over some broken crockery.
| 110 | "Some You Lose (Part 2)" | Laurence Moody | Margaret Phelan | Meera Syal, Moya Brady, Rowena Cooper and Rob Jarvis guest star | 28 September 1995 |
Deakin and Morgan are back in court following the two-day adjournment, but find themselves in an even worse position when one of the star witnesses takes an overdose and subsequently dies, and the other turns up to court high on drugs. As the defendant escapes a jail sentence and is only charged with a minor offence, Lines and Croft arrive at court to re-arrest the suspect with a file full of fresh evidence against him.
| 111 | "Rock-a-bye Baby" | Baz Taylor | David G. McDonagh | Victoria Alcock guest stars | 29 September 1995 |
Ackland tries to find a young baby who has been snatched from her mother's car, but is surprised to discover the prime suspect is pregnant herself – until a search of her house reveals some very clever costumes to improvise stages of a pregnancy. As the search for the child yields no clues, Ackland makes a brave decision to continue the interview off the record in order to secure the baby's safety.
| 112 | "Video Nasty" | James Cellan Jones | David Hoskins | Michael Redfern guest stars | 3 October 1995 |
Deakin and Carver embark on a frantic search for a booby-trapped television set after a bomb hidden in a VCR destroys a local electrical shop. The owner of the items, an ex-military explosives expert, booby-trapped the goods following five break-ins at his address over a short period of time in an attempt to deter any further burglaries. However, a burglary at the flat next door impedes their search and the search continues to find the bomb before anyone else is hurt.
| 113 | "Bad Pictures" | Laurence Moody | Terry Hodgkinson | Shaun Parkes, Jasper Britton and Ian Redford guest star | 5 October 1995 |
Carver and Woods accuse a petty criminal of child pornography when he hands in a film containing compromising pictures to his local printing shop. However, he claims the rolls of film were from a burglary he committed just days before, but the owner of the house claims no such incident took place. However, Carver's suspicions are soon confirmed with a visit to the man's brother-in-law, and soon enough they find a hidden collection of incriminating material.
| 114 | "Fire (Part 1)" | John Strickland | Edward Canfor-Dumas | Joan Ann Maynard guest stars | 6 October 1995 |
Ackland and Loxton are listening to a complaint from a passer-by when she is shot dead by a sniper. Morgan and Meadows initially suspect that Loxton was the intended target, as he was due to give evidence in court against a violent thug accused of attempted murder that afternoon. However, when petrol is poured through Ackland's letterbox and an attempt is made on her life, they soon realise that Ackland was the target after all.
| 115 | "All Tucked Up (Part 2)" | John Strickland | Edward Canfor-Dumas | — | 10 October 1995 |
Morgan and Meadows try to find out who wants Ackland dead, and she draws up a list of ex-cons and villains who she thinks may be responsible. The investigation soon centres on a violent scrapyard dealer whom Ackland jailed several years previously, but it's Beech's informant who eventually comes up with a name – a hitman named Mickey Seager, who claims that he has been paid "to do a copper". The manhunt to find Seager soon gets underway.
| 116 | "Bait (Part 3)" | John Strickland | Edward Canfor-Dumas | Final appearances of Ch Insp Paul Stritch and WDS Jo Morgan; Amanda Abbington guest stars | 12 October 1995 |
Ackland decides to go back out on the streets to draw the hitman back out into the open. Meanwhile, Tosh is dealing with a witness to the arson at June's flat, unaware of her involvement in the case. As she overhears a conversation between Conway and Stritch, it allows her to concoct an elaborate plan to catch an unwitting Ackland as she is leaving the station. However, tragedy strikes when Morgan tries to warn her of the impending danger.
| 117 | "Damage Limitation (Part 4)" | John Strickland | Edwin Pearce | — | 13 October 1995 |
Ackland is racked with guilt over the death of Morgan, and an internal inquiry is held into the incident, during which Meadows points the blame in the direction of Conway and Stritch to cover up his own misjudgements. Meanwhile, back on duty, Ackland assists Cryer in dealing with some youths damaging a sports shop, while the relief attend a market raid. Loxton is then forced to apologise to a pair of loudmouthed youths after he threatens them.
| 118 | "Solid Gold Cert" | Laurence Moody | Neil Clarke | — | 17 October 1995 |
Beech organises an obbo on a known fence in an attempt to catch him in the process of selling stolen gear, but trying to escape, the thief jumps from a second storey balcony. As he begins to recover in hospital, his accomplice refuses to give him up, but it's not until Quinnan manages to make a breakthrough with the man's distraught wife that they finally discover who was responsible for the raid during which the gear was stolen.
| 119 | "Mugs" | Dominic Lees | Mark Holloway | Bruce Byron guest stars | 19 October 1995 |
Keane and Jarvis attempt to keep the peace at a dodgy backstreet auction on the Jasmine Allen where the customers are furious of being duped out of hundreds of pounds. However, the auctioneer is ambushed on his way out of the estate, and the pair try to find out who was responsible for catapulting a scaffolding pole through the windscreen of his van, causing a major crash. Keane turns a blind eye when she finds some of the goods stolen during the ambush.
| 120 | "Off Limits" | Dominic Lees | Peter J. Hammond | Annette Badland, Shirin Taylor and Patsy Rowlands guest star | 20 October 1995 |
Quinnan and Datta follow up reports of a disturbance in a quiet suburban street, and uncover a family who have barricaded themselves in their home. Meanwhile, Beech is trying to hunt down the prime suspect in a number of warehouse robberies, but he has mysteriously disappeared. When Quinnan and Datta attend an attempted robbery in the nearby street, they soon find the clues are piecing themselves together, and both cases soon become entwined.
| 121 | "Strictly Personal" | Keith Boak | Marianne Colbran | — | 24 October 1995 |
Beech finds himself under pressure when the daughter of an old friend is implicated in the violent murder of accountant Clive Vardy, who is found with his head caved in an industrial warehouse. Determined to try to keep his daughter off the hook, the girl's father tries to set her boyfriend up for the killing, aided by the fact he was stopped by police in the area just minutes after Vardy was killed. Can Beech keep his old friend out of trouble?
| 122 | "Day of Rest" | A.J. Quinn | Roy MacGregor | Nicholas Day guest stars | 26 October 1995 |
The quiet of a tranquil Sunday morning shift is soon disrupted when a number of cases flood CAD. Cryer investigates when a young partygoer disappears and ends up in hospital following a suspected drugs overdose. Slater deals with a disturbance where a man has been attacked by his wife. Garfield deals with a family row between a referee and his son-in-law, which turns nasty, and Keane deals with an irate man making a protest in a local supermarket.
| 123 | "Allegations and Allegiances" | Baz Taylor | Nigel Baldwin | Emma Amos guest stars | 27 October 1995 |
Quinnan is accused of sexual harassment by the victim of a burglary, but McCann refuses to confirm his alibi, having not been with him at the time. However, when the victim is found badly beaten by her boyfriend, she admits the claim was false and that he pressured her into making a false statement. Meanwhile, Stamp and Ackland catch a burglar who provides some vital information for Greig and Croft's latest investigation.
| 124 | "Honeypot" | Simon Meyers | Nick Crittenden | Craig Charles and Joe Absolom guest star | 31 October 1995 |
Garfield and Keane find themselves on the opposite side of the fence when they are thrown out of school grounds while trying to pursue a drug dealer. While Keane offers support to a young boy found in possession of ecstasy, Monroe visits the headmaster, who refuses to recognise that there is a drugs problem, despite the same young later overdosing on school grounds, and some strict intervention from the boy's teacher.
| 125 | "Saved" | Jeremy Silberston | Matthew Wingett | First regular appearance of DS John Boulton | 2 November 1995 |
When a seemingly open and shut trial is thrown out, Carver considers an offer from a friend at Hendon who is quitting the force to start his own security firm. To make matters worse, he learns that Pearce's successor is John Boulton, with whom he has a complicated history (Faith in the System- S10). As they are paired together on a drugs raid, old tensions rise to the surface once more, but they agree to help a prostitute arrested during the raid to rescue her baby son from her violent pimp – only for the witness to back down and Carver's Achilles to be named as the pimp's brief. Can they put their differences aside to make the charges stick?
| 126 | "A Year and A Day" | Gwennan Sage | Nicholas McInerny | — | 3 November 1995 |
Greig and Skase are given the task of taking up the investigation into a man badly beaten outside a pub on the Netherlake estate, eleven months after Lines initially investigated the case. It soon transpires that the attack may have been motivated by rival burger van owners warring to take over a prime location outside the pub, but angered at the lip from Skase, Lines decides to give the case another crack and the three soon discover who was responsible.
| 127 | "With This Body" | Simon Meyers | Len Collin | Peter Craze guest stars | 7 November 1995 |
Boyden and Woods investigate a suspicious death when the body of a man is found in the passenger seat of a car. They discover that the man led several double lives – including two wives and two mistresses. With the cause of death determined as natural causes, their only task is to find out who he was with on the night he died, and who moved his body into the car. While dealing with the identification, Monroe tries to avoid the man's two wives meeting.
| 128 | "Deadline" | A.J. Quinn | David Hoskins | Hour-long episode; David Tennant, Dermot Crowley, Barbara Marten and Honeysuckle Weeks guest star | 8 November 1995 |
A young girl disappears on her way home from a sports club, and a short while later, telephones her parents to say she has been abducted. Croft recognises the voice of the kidnapper, and Deakin subsequently makes an arrest, but the kidnapper refuses to acknowledge where the abducted girl is hidden. When they discover she is being held in an airtight van, they realise time is slowly running out and the girl could soon suffocate.
| 129 | "Lockdown" | Nick Laughland | Stephen Plaice | Charles Dale, Sean Scanlan, Pip Torrens and Geoffrey McGivern guest star | 9 November 1995 |
Carver and Croft investigate the murder of a convicted child molester in his prison cell.
| 130 | "Last Waltz" | Michael Simpson | Tom Needham | Christine Kavanagh guest stars | 10 November 1995 |
Ackland and Quinnan question a lodger when his landlady is abducted from her office. When they later find the missing woman in the back of the lodger's van,
| 131 | "Compensation" | Jeremy Silbertson | Nigel Baldwin | Gwyneth Strong and Bernard Holley guest star | 14 November 1995 |
Boulton and Woods investigate the kidnapping of a teenage girl. When they tail the girl's stepfather as he attempts to pay a ransom of £1,000, Woods is recognised by the suspect, whose escape leads him into the path of a moving car. However, when the young girl comes to visit the victim in hospital, Boulton discovers the missing teen is the victim's girlfriend – and that her stepfather invented the kidnapping to cover up the fact he has been sexually abusing her.
| 132 | "The Wee Small Hours" | Gwennan Sage | Michael Jenner | Carol Leader guest stars | 16 November 1995 |
Marshall attends to a widow who thinks that she is being stalked, but whose son doesn't believe it. When Jarvis and Keane arrest a young man trying to break into her car, they discover a schoolboy crush that has spiralled out of control. Meanwhile a raid on an illegal drinking club gives Monroe a lead in the search for a driver who fled from the scene of an accident that left a motorcyclist with serious injuries.
| 133 | "Photocall" | John Strickland | J. C. Wilsher | Matt Bardock guest stars | 17 November 1995 |
Greig leads the relief as they tackle a group of rioters on the Meadowlark estate, but the violence spirals out of control when a TSG sergeant has a slab of concrete dropped on him. As Greig builds up a picture of the thugs who Meadows believes are responsible for the crime, Garfield is worried when Loxton comments that his violent restraint of a thug during the riots led to the man ending up in hospital, leading him to ask Greig for help.
| 134 | "Love Me, Love My Dog" | John Bruce | Maxwell Young | Maggie Ollerenshaw guest stars | 21 November 1995 |
McCann learns some hard truths about what it takes to be a sergeant as he and Stamp search for a troubled schizophrenic who has been harassing his neighbours. As they speak to the young man's grandmother, who appears to be the driving force behind his recent campaign, they discover his neighbours may have been responsible for a fire which burned down the man's flat six months ago. As they continue their search, McCann is devastated when they find a body in the local park.
| 135 | "Heart of Gold" | Christopher Hodson | Neil Clarke | David Gooderson guest stars | 23 November 1995 |
Boulton and Lines investigate when a businessman reports his credit card stolen, claiming that a man posing as a police officer telephoned him to confirm the pin number. Meanwhile, Loxton and Marshall stop a man attempting use a stolen credit card in an electrical shop. He later reveals he was subcontracted by the victim to carry out work on a building site but was never paid – but refuses to identify who stole the card for him.
| 136 | "Dying Breath" | Michael Simpson | Gregory Evans | Nicholas Donnelly guest stars | 24 November 1995 |
Slater and Page are called to a break-in and discover a woman drowned in her own bath. Initially, the woman's ex-partner is suspected of murder when her GP confirms that she was in hiding from him to prevent him getting access to their unborn baby. However, Slater's interview with a tenant in the same housing block soon reveals an alternative cause of death, and Monroe pursues the woman's dodgy landlord for manslaughter, for reconnecting a dangerous water heater leaking carbon monoxide.
| 137 | "Poison" | Keith Boak | Chris Lang | Oscar James guest stars | 28 November 1995 |
Deakin and Croft investigate a blackmail threat against a supermarket owner, after Stamp and Garfield are handed a contaminated pie which has given a woman food poisoning. Boulton attempts to use state-of-the-art forensics to decipher indentations on one of the ransom notes, while Lines speaks to an ex-employee who initially denies all involvement – until he discovers that the victim of the contaminated pie is none other than the woman's daughter.
| 138 | "Three in a Row" | Ken Hannam | Renny Krupinski | — | 30 November 1995 |
Stamp and Keane attend the scene of an RTA involving a car and a double-decker bus, but find the car to be stolen and the juvenile driver over the limit. When one of the passengers on the bus later dies of a heart attack, Stamp tries to implicate the youth in the woman's death. Meanwhile, Garfield spots a familiar face at the scene of the RTA but is unable to place him until he discovers the man is a wanted criminal who escaped serving a 10-year jail sentence for fraud.
| 139 | "Neutral Territory" | Tom Cotter | David G. McDonagh | Wil Johnson guest stars | 1 December 1995 |
Lines takes part in a new mediation scheme to encourage attackers to face up to their victims, unaware of the response he is going to receive. Meanwhile, officers from Sun Hill take on young offenders in a game of football, but the poor decisions of the referee and the settling of some old scores lead to Loxton being sent off. However, the event yields a surprise result for Beech and Woods when they catch a runner for a major dealer delivering a shipment of drugs.
| 140 | "Getaway" | Kate Cheeseman | Candy Denman | Tom Hollander guest stars | 4 December 1995 |
Deakin investigates a bungled armed robbery at a betting shop, where one of the robbers managed to shoot himself while attempting a getaway on a stolen motorbike. When the robber then absconds from hospital, the race is on to find him before he bleeds to death. Meanwhile, Boulton manages to identify the man's accomplice as a villain he nicked several years previously. The getaway car then used to take the injured villain to hospital is found in a lock, with his body in the boot.
| 141 | "Smoke Gets in Your Eyes" | Christopher Hodson | Jim Hawkins | Peter Tuddenham and John Ioannou guest star | 7 December 1995 |
Loxton attends a possible break-in at a snooker hall, but finds himself in trouble when he sets off some sort of smoke trap, leaving him open to attack. He then arrests the owner when the owner tries to assault him, suspecting him of being a burglar. However, Loxton isn't convinced that the man is telling the truth, and believes the man was sitting in wait for the real burglar to arrive. When the club is then ransacked, Loxton's suspicions are proven to be correct.
| 142 | "Natural Justice" | Robin Sheppard | Graham Mitchell | Renu Setna and Barbara Wilshere guest star | 12 December 1995 |
Cryer and Keane pursue a drink-driver responsible for the death of a young Asian woman. When they interview the registered owner of the car, she denies all knowledge of the incident, despite the car having been driven off with the keys inside. Their strongest lead comes when McCann and Jarvis arrest a noisy neighbour for breach of the peace and assault, and during a search, they find a bottle of homemade spirit which matches a bottle found under the driver's seat of the car which killed the woman.
| 143 | "Got To Get A Body" | Michael Cocker | Stephen C. Handley | Sally George, Kelly Marcel and Craig Heaney guest star | 14 December 1995 |
Skase investigates an ex-informer's love life in his hunt for clues to a series of arson attacks which have been left unsolved following the swift departure of DS Pearce. When she offers the identity of the arsonist in return for getting her boyfriend off the hook, Skase suspects that she is simply toying with the police in order for her boyfriend to receive immunity. However, when another fire breaks out, Skase realises she may have been telling the truth all along.
| 144 | "No Questions Asked" | Catherine Morshead | Ron Rose | Marc Warren and Philip McGough guest star | 15 December 1995 |
Ackland and Stamp deal with a teenage tearaway whose petty criminal career spirals out of control when she flirts with some serious villains. A search of her bedroom yields a substantial amount of stolen gear as well as drugs and a large sum of money. As the search for the young girl gets underway, Hollis minds an elderly woman who has been robbed and assaulted by a local boy, who is easily able to identify her attacker – who happens to be one of Ackland and Stamp's targets in the stolen gear operation.
| 145 | "Sweet Innocent" | Michael Cocker | Scott Cherry | — | 19 December 1995 |
Stamp and Slater attend to a break-in and apprehend a suspect with a suspiciously large sum of money, but the occupier denies all knowledge of the cash. Deakin suspects that the proceeds are from a betting shop robbery where the suspects got away with £24,000 in cash. With Stamp and Slater's suspect already in the frame, Deakin tries to work out whether he already had the money on him before he committed the burglary, or whether the occupier was keeping it safe for him.
| 146 | "Drop" | Tom Cotter | Mark Holloway | Lee Turnbull guest stars | 21 December 1995 |
Jarvis and Loxton attend a burglary, but by the time they catch up with the fleeing suspect, his loot has gone and he denies being at the scene. Stamp and Page attend when a young boy falls from the roof of a nearby factory attempting to retrieve some money thrown away by the burglar. Greig investigates when the young boy dies of his injuries, and tries to gather evidence on a cocksure solicitor whose call to the boy's mother subsequently led to his untimely death.
| 147 | "On the Lookout" | Kate Cheeseman | Richard McBrien | Chris Gascoyne guest stars | 22 December 1995 |
Boyden and Slater are on a surveillance operation to target a burglar aiming to hit a computer design factory. However, they are distracted, and the op goes wrong. Meanwhile, Stamp and Keane stop a driver with a large quantity of goods in his van. Suspecting that they are the proceeds of the robbery, Boyden arrests the suspect, only to discover the only stolen property was five computer rams worth around £500 each. Slater's informant then comes up with some useful information.
| 148 | "Ties that Bind" | Ken Hannam | Ron Rose | Ingrid Lacey guest stars | 28 December 1995 |
Datta and Monroe investigate when a baby girl is found abandoned on the steps of the local social services building. A young boy then comes into the station, claiming that he might be the child's father. The baby's grandmother denies all knowledge and claims that her daughter miscarried five months ago, but when Datta and Monroe find her in a newly built apartment block, they discover that mother and daughter have been keeping more than the truth from one another.
| 149 | "Journey Home" | Diana Patrick | Graham Harvey | Patrick Jordan, Connor McIntyre and Stewart Bevan guest star | 29 December 1995 |
Carver's ex-girlfriend gets caught up in a suspected drugs-related attack when she is ambushed at the wheel of major drug baron Benny Cram's car. When one of Cram's mates is then beaten up on his own doorstep, Carver initially suspects that a rival operation are attempting to take Cram out, but he soon realises that Cram may be trying to get a message out to his own people. The situation turns from bad to worse when the woman refuses to give a statement regarding the attack.
