= The Bill series 13 =

The Bill
- Series 13
- Series 13 DVD cover
- No. of episodes: 152

Release
- Original network: ITV
- Original release: 2 January – 30 December 1997

Series chronology
- ← Previous; Series 12 Next → Series 14

The thirteenth series of The Bill, a British television drama, was broadcast from 2 January to 30 December 1997. The series consists of 152 episodes, including three-hour-long specials.

On 3 April 2013, the complete series was released as a two-part region-free DVD box set in Australia. The DVD artwork depicts DSs Don Beech (Billy Murray) and John Boulton (Russell Boulter).

== Cast ==
There were just two cast departures in the series after four the year before; actor Tom Butcher left the role of PC Steve Loxton after seven years on the show; however, he would return in two episodes in 1999 as a guest at Dave Quinnan's wedding. The other departure was that of Alan Westaway, who left his role of PC Nick Slater after two and a half years.

Their characters were replaced by PCs Luke Ashton and Sam Harker, with actors Scott Neal and Matthew Crompton appearing as guest actors on a number of times, both of the actors' most recent guest stints coming the previous year. The series also saw DC Tom Proctor introduced into CID.

Actor Gregory Donaldson revealed in a 2018 interview on The Bill Podcast that the role came after impressing producers in a guest stint earlier in the series, portraying burglary suspect Andy Melford in an hour-long special, "In the Dark".

=== Arrivals ===
- DC Tom Proctor ("Foxed")
- PC Luke Ashton ("Potential For Conflict")
- PC Sam Harker ("Things That Go Bump in the Night")

=== Departures ===
- PC Nick Slater ("Free to Speak?") – Transfers to SO10
- PC Steve Loxton ("No Trace") – Resigns after being angered by a complaint about his old school methods

== Episodes ==
No. in series	Title	Directed by	Written by	Episode notes	Original release date
1	"The Old Pals' Act"	Chris Lovett	Edwin Pearce	Neil Reidman and Daniel Brocklebank guest star	2 January 1997
Conway leads a raid on an after-hours pub, but during the raid, both Hollis and Keane are injured. Meanwhile, McCann and Slater stop a young boy trying to make an exit through the fire escape and find him in possession of cannabis and a substantial amount of money. Brownlow is called in when the boy is discovered to be the son of the local district judge.
2	"All's Fair"	Ian White	Rosamund Orde-Powlett	David Sibley guest stars	3 January 1997
McCann and Keane investigate when a man is found mugged having been sprayed in the face with Mace. Hours later, a woman arrives at the station claiming to have been attacked by a mysterious assailant, whom she rebuffed with Mace. Daly has to work out which party is telling the truth, and to prove it decides to speak to one of the man's previous victims.
3	"Man Trap"	Peter Lydon	Nick Crittenden	Martin Freeman, Jill Halfpenny and David Spinx guest star	9 January 1997
Quinnan and Blake investigate when a teenage boy is found dead from an electric shock in the flat of one of his neighbours. Initial suspicion falls upon a poor DIY job to wire up an outside light, but when Ackland and McCann discover that the victim and his brother were blackmailing local residents over tenancy agreements, another motive comes to light.
4	"Bad Debt"	Jo Shoop	Clive Dawson	Michelle Butterly and Derek Martin guest star	10 January 1997
Beech and Croft investigate the theft of a loan shark's records, but Beech's prior acquaintance with the victim proves to be an issue for Croft. Meanwhile, Ackland and Page investigate when a young girl comes to the station to report a loan shark who has been hassling her mother - and uniform and CID find an interesting link between the two cases. Note: this episode marks another milestone in the development in the long-term storyline involving Don Beech's corruption. Early on the episode Meadows pulls Beech aside to question his relationship to the loan shark; "It's getting beyond a joke Don; there's just too many questionable acquaintance turning up - too many nods and winks and quiet chats." The episode ends with Beech having just gotten away with it by the skin of his teeth, which would become a recurring theme.
5	"Professional Opinion"	Peter Lydon	Nigel Baldwin	Gordon Salkilld guest stars	14 January 1997
Daly and Skase investigate a woman whose son died after drinking her methadone.
6	"Testament"	Chris Lovett	Peter J. Hammond	—	16 January 1997
Croft and Boulton investigate the sudden death of an apparently healthy, but secretive woman.
7	"A Policeman's Lot"	Ian White	Clive Dawson	Vicky Entwistle, Kenneth MacDonald and Bruce Byron guest star	17 January 1997
Garfield objects when the officers of Sun Hill are forced to work with security guards following a vicious mugging and a burglary.
8	"The Devil You Know"	Tom Cotter	Andrew Rattenbury	René Zagger and Terence Beesley guest star	21 January 1997
Garfield and Keane attend to a girl who collapses at a party after taking Ecstasy. Her father is convinced that she has been influenced by her boyfriend, but his faith in his daughter may not be justified.
9	"Once Bitten"	Mandy Honeyman	David G. McDonagh	Rebecca Lacey and Dean Harris guest stars	23 January 1997
Greig investigates a drug smuggling ring. The wife of one of the suspects is one of Boyden's former lovers and she suggests giving their relationship a second chance.
10	"Turnaround"	Chris Lovett	Graham Mitchell	Tony Guilfoyle guest stars	24 January 1997
Meadows and Deakin investigate the disappearance of a convicted child sex offender following a campaign of harassment.
11	"Over the Fence"	Simon Meyers	Renny Krupinski	June Page guest stars	28 January 1997
Cryer and Loxton go to the scene of a disturbance between neighbours. They manage to calm the situation down but Steve recognises one of the neighbours that he arrested a few years previously for burglary. He sees the box for an expensive computer outside the house which he suspects is stolen. He and Cryer find themselves drawn into another argument between the two couples when they're both found to be in possession of computer equipment stolen during a ram raid robbery of a factory and each one claims to have bought it from the other.
12	"Grey Area"	Jane Prowse	Nicholas McInerny	Fiona Victory and Adjoa Andoh guest star	30 January 1997
Meadows and Rawton investigate a doctor accused of killing a terminally-ill patient in his care.
13	"One Big Happy Family"	John Bruce	Steve Handley	—	31 January 1997
Garfields complaint that Brownlow and Conway are out touch with real police work brings an unexpected response.
14	"The Eye of the Beholder"	Chris Lovett	Margaret Phelan	Doña Croll and Jonathan Newth guest star	4 February 1997
Datta is trying to secure a conviction in a domestic violence case, but the victim unwittingly leaves out important details when giving evidence.
15	"Say a Little Prayer"	Jo Shoop	James Mavor	Joe Jacobs guest stars	6 February 1997
Quinnan and Page try to find the culprit who threw a television set from the balcony of a block of flats and narrowly missed Slater.
16	"Downfall"	Brian Parker	Peter J. Hammond	Helen Blatch, Dolly Wells and Carol Hawkins guest star	7 February 1997
Daly and Skase investigate after a man is found dead at the foot of the stairs in his apartment block.
17	"True to Life Player"	Simon Meyers	Tunde Babalola	Dannielle Brent, Fionnuala Ellwood and David Harewood guest star	11 February 1997
Boulton and Carver investigate an allegation that a football star raped a young fan.
18	"Take Away"	Adrian J. Fearnley	Richard Stoneman	—	13 February 1997
Ackland investigates a complaint from a prisoner that he was given a pizza topped with cigarette ends.
19	"Your Call Too"	Nick Laughland	David Hoskins	Chris Gascoyne guest stars	14 February 1997
Croft and Skase disagree when they have to choose between investigating an assault charge and a cocaine deal.
20	"Breaking Up"	Jan Sargent	Elizabeth-Anne Wheal	Denise Welch guest stars	18 February 1997
Rawton investigates a woman's claims that her ex-husband's mistress is trying to kill her.
21	"A Price to Pay"	Edward Blum	Carolyn Sally Jones	—	20 February 1997
Boulton tries to trap a roomful of crooks, but Greig gets his man.
22	"Just Looking"	Tom Cotter	Chris Ould	Paul Bown and Cheryl Hall guest star	21 February 1997
Boyden deals with a man stopped for soliciting who claims he was searching for his missing daughter.
23	"A Tangled Web"	Jeremy Silberston	Tony Lindsay	Frank Grimes and Geoffrey Freshwater guest star	27 February 1997
Deakin and Croft investigate when a man is found shot with his brother's wife, as two unhappy marriages reach crisis point.
24	"Rolling in It"	Nick Laughland	Jimmy Gardner	Jane Hazlegrove and John Light guest star	28 February 1997
Slater and Quinnan find drugs in a Lamborghini, but the owner blames his unemployed brother-in-law.
25	"Added Bonus"	Nigel Douglas	Julian Spilsbury	Kim Taylforth guest stars	4 March 1997
Greig tries to establish why a man has confessed to a burglary that he didn't commit.
26	"Holding On"	Brian Parker	Kevin Scouler	Robyn Moore guest stars	6 March 1997
Cryer and Blake respond to a young man's claim that his stolen car had his four-month-old baby inside, but Blake suspects that the man's wife may know more about her son's disappearance than she is letting on. The plot thickens when Cryer interviews the man responsible for stealing the young man's car and he claims that he fed information about the man's extra marital relations to his wife.
27	"Crime Management"	Catherine Morshead	J. C. Wilsher	Jamie Foreman and Ken Drury guest star	7 March 1997
Croft and Lines try to get the victim of a stabbing to identify his attacker, aware that the attack may have been orchestrated by a vicious loanshark who has been on Lines's radar for some time. Meanwhile Boulton, who is aware that Lines hasn't recruited an informant for months, is forced to have a quiet word in Deakin's ear after Deakin asks the team to speak to their informants about a gang responsible for a number of warehouse robberies.
28	"Age Gaps"	Jan Sargent	Julian Perkins	—	11 March 1997
Boulton and Rawton try to persuade a teenage girl to turn informant after her boyfriend is attacked by drug dealers.
29	"In the Dark"	Robin Sheppard	Tom Needham	Hour-long episode; Charles Dale and Amelia Bullmore guest star	12 March 1997
Skase hopes that information provided by a blind woman after a burglary may help to catch a dangerous serial killer.
30	"Crying Wolf"	Catherine Morshead	Edwin Pearce	George Rossi and Cathy Murphy guest star	13 March 1997
Monroe is called in to mediate when a former mental patient is accused of threatening behaviour by his elderly neighbours. Notes: George Rossi would join the cast as DC Duncan Lennox in 1998
31	"Confidence"	Gill Wilkinson	Philip Kingston	Elaine Lordan guest stars	14 March 1997
Keane uses information supplied by a friend to help CID in an operation against a drug dealer.
32	"All For Love"	Gill Wilkinson	Tony Mulholland	Bruce Alexander and Jo Kendall guest star	18 March 1997
Greig and Lines investigate an assault on a man who has previously killed two people in a drink-driving accident, and suspect that a relative may have sought natural justice.
33	"Only the Lonely"	Martin Hutchings	Clive Dawson	Andrew Powell, Louisa Lytton, Dido Miles and Angela Bruce guest star	20 March 1997
Deakin and Skase investigate a fire, and find that a mother's grief has had unexpected repercussions.
34	"Copier"	Harry Bradbeer	Simon Tyrrell	Peter Cleall and Amanda Abbington guest star	21 March 1997
Rawton investigates the assault of a woman in her new flat and tries to link the attack to an unsolved case.
35	"Fashion Victims"	Jeremy Silberston	Gwyneth Hughes	Marlene Sidaway guest stars	25 March 1997
Slater and Garfield arrest a boy for selling stolen goods.
36	"Hook, Line and Sinker"	Justin Hardy	Ben Cooper	Vicki Pepperdine and Trevor Byfield guest star	27 March 1997
Beech investigates a woman who uses her sexuality to con her business partner and clients.
37	"No Claims Bonus"	Justin Hardy	Nicholas McInerny	Philip Martin Brown guest stars	28 March 1997
Croft is concerned when Boulton decides to use a former colleague, now down on his luck, as an informant.
38	"Joker"	Martin Hutchings	Katharine Way	Alan Ford, Desmond McNamara and David Horovitch guest star	31 March 1997
Beech and Croft investigate the killing of a stand-up comic.
39	"Typecast"	Mandy Honeyman	Isabelle Grey	Marc Bolton and Shirin Taylor guest star	1 April 1997
Boyden and Page try to find who is responsible for a series of graffiti attacks.
40	"A Hard Rain"	John Bruce	Stephen McAteer	Ariyon Bakare guest stars	3 April 1997
Boulton and Croft have to deal with rival drug dealers when a customer suffers tragic consequences.
41	"Rings on Her Fingers"	Chris Lovett	Simon Moss	First appearance of new style Motorola MTS2000 radios; Sean Arnold guest stars	4 April 1997
Jarvis and Rawton investigate the ram raiding of a shop.
42	"Strange Meeting"	Jo Shoop	Len Collin	Ron Donachie and James Hooton guest stars	8 April 1997
Conway coordinates the search for an escaped sex offender and a missing teenager who was last seen in his company.
43	"A Bitter Pill"	Sarah Harding	Barry Simner	Rob Jarvis and John Rogan guest star	10 April 1997
Rawton and Skase investigate an attempted suicide by an ill woman, and suspect her son and daughter of assisting her.
44	"Dial 'M' For Marmalade"	Sarah Harding	Edward Canford-Dumas	Charles Kay guest stars	11 April 1997
Meadows investigates a murder by strangulation and suspects the homeless schizophrenic man whom the victim had befriended.
45	"Sisters"	Gwennan Sage	Chris Lang	David Quilter guest stars	15 April 1997
Daly and Croft investigate the suspicious death of one of three sisters.
46	"Flesh and Blood"	Nigel Douglas	Anne Downey	Tracey Wilkinson and Lloyd McGuire guest star	17 April 1997
Beech investigates the sudden death of a baby on the night that his parents celebrated their anniversary.
47	"Parklife"	Nigel Douglas	Stephen Plaice	Connor McIntyre guest stars	18 April 1997
Loxton and WPC Keane deal with the burglary of a pharmacy and a violent stabbing.
48	"Two's Company"	Jo Shoop	Nigel Baldwin	Natalie Roles guest stars	22 April 1997
Greig and Croft investigate a burglary and discover that the married householder had been in contact with a girl through a "lonely hearts" column. Notes: Natalie Roles would join the cast as DS Debbie McAllister in 2000.
49	"Inside Edge"	John Bruce	Elizabeth-Anne Wheal	—	25 April 1997
Meadows and Rawton investigate the assault of a prison officer.
50	"You and Me Versus the World"	Ged Maguire	Rod Beacham	Heather Peace guest stars	29 April 1997
Boulton and Lines investigate a vicious hammer attack.
51	"Pay Back"	Jonathan Hacker	Patrick Melanaphy	Andrew Lancel guest stars	1 May 1997
Beech and Carver investigate a vicious attack, but have to piece the evidence together when neither the suspect nor victim can remember what happened.
52	"A Place of Your Own"	Michael Cocker	Kevin Scouler	Charlie Brooks and Cindy O'Callaghan guest star	2 May 1997
Garfield and Page search for a missing teenager and come across a man who exploits children in care.
53	"Don't Want to Hear the Bad News"	Jonathan Hacker	Paul Mousley	—	6 May 1997
Daly and Skase investigate a burglary and uncover a deep rift between the suspect's girlfriend and her mother.
54	"It's Good to Talk"	Gwennan Sage	Julian Spilsbury	Adrian Scarborough guest stars	8 May 1997
Monroe coordinates a search for the victims of a kidnapping.
55	"Split Second"	Ged Maguire	Candy Denman	Kelly George guest stars	9 May 1997
Page ends up in a hostage situation following a failed armed robbery.
56	"Old Fools"	Brian Parker	Ben Cooper	Keith Marsh guest stars	13 May 1997
Greig and Croft enlist the help of two pensioners to trap a team of burglars.
57	"Auld Lang Syne"	Michael Cocker	Terry Hodgkinson	Howell Evans, Patricia Kane and Rosemary Martin guest star	15 May 1997
Page and Slater find an apologetic stranger in an elderly couple's back garden, but when Rawton digs deeper into his background his motives for being there seem more suspicious than he made out.
58	"Warnings"	Brian Parker	Peter J. Hammond	Arthur White and Jo Warne guest star	16 May 1997
Boyden and Datta respond to an apparent sighting of a missing woman by her daughter.
59	"Calling Time"	John Bruce	Edwin Pearce	Jacquetta May guest stars	20 May 1997
Boulton and Rawton investigate when a pub landlord is run over after giving Boulton information.
60	"Black and Blue"	Mike Vardy	Matthew Leys	Fay Ripley and Aden Gillett guest star	22 May 1997
Jarvis and Keane arrest a nanny for stealing from her employers.
61	"A Bunch of Fives"	Chris Lovett	Tom Needham	Dominic Power and Justin Pickett guest star	23 May 1997
Shock waves strike Sun Hill when Beech is found beaten unconscious in an alleyway. Uniform and CID join forces to find his attackers.
62	"Short, Sharp, Shock"	Tania Diez	Mark Illis	Su Elliott guest stars	27 May 1997
Boulton and Skase investigate a mugging, but the victim's father takes the law into his own hands
63	"Get You Back"	Dominic Lees	Simon Tyrrell	Amy Marston guest stars	29 May 1997
Quinnan and Keane deal with a teenage girl with a broken nose who claims that her ex-boyfriend assaulted her.
64	"Powers of Persuasion"	Tania Diez	Graham Mitchell	—	30 May 1997
Rawton and Boulton have to decide whether to find the driver of a car involved in a hit-and-run incident, or to prosecute the witness.
65	"A Rock and a Hard Place"	Mike Vardy	Matthew Wingett	Barbara Marten and Catherine Tate guest star	3 June 1997
Deakin and Carver come under pressure from Conway to find a vicious robber who has been preying on elderly victims.
66	"The Wrath of God"	Audrey Cooke	Terry Hodgkinson	Ellen Thomas and Larrington Walker guest star	5 June 1997
Skase and Carver have to deal with a preacher who specialises in dodgy miracles.
67	"Knight Errant"	Dominic Lees	Anna Wheatley	Natasha Dahlberg guest stars	6 June 1997
Loxton struggles to cope with a young female suspect who makes no secret of her attraction to him.
68	"Punch Bag"	Mike Vardy	Steve Handley	Andrée Bernard guest stars	10 June 1997
Skase and Croft investigate the circumstances leading to a mother ending up unconscious at the foot of a stairway.
69	"Best Eaten Cold"	Peter Lydon	Alan Pollock	—	12 June 1997
Greig and Rawton investigate a journalist's claims that he acted in self-defence to stop an intruder.
70	"Lucky Day"	Peter Lydon	Scott Cherry	—	13 June 1997
Meadows is concerned when Lines seems to be getting too involved in investigating the sale of some stolen cars.
71	"For Richer, For Poorer"	Albert Barber	Nigel Baldwin	Annie Hulley and Ben Miles guest star	17 June 1997
Quinnan and Garfield look into the disappearance of a man reported missing by his mother, although his wife has her doubts.
72	"No More Milk"	John Bruce	Terry Hodgkinson	—	19 June 1997
Rawton and Page have to deal with a 14-year-old tearaway and half a million pounds in counterfeit money.
73	"An Englishman's Home"	Simon Massey	Barry Simner	Susan Jameson guest stars	20 June 1997
Garfield and Blake are called to help enforce a demolition order on a home extension, when an ongoing dispute between neighbours erupts into violence.
74	"Loyal to the Last"	John Bruce	Chris McWatters	Nicola Duffett guest stars	24 June 1997
Blake arrests a woman for assault and Beech tries to persuade her to help convict her husband for forgery.
75	"Rent"	Albert Barber	Stephen McAteer	James McAvoy guest stars	26 June 1997
Boyden and Keane investigate the hit-and-run of a young busker.
76	"Last Respects"	Harry Bradbeer	Stephen Plaice	Perry Fenwick and Kacey Ainsworth guest star	27 June 1997
Meadows hopes that a family funeral will lure a couple of jewel thieves into the open.
77	"Too Much to Lose"	Harry Bradbeer	Candy Denman	—	1 July 1997
Stamp tries to persuade an unhappy convict not to ruin his chances of release.
78	"Do Unto Others"	Ross Devenish	Tony Lindsay	Julie Hesmondhalgh and Eric Mason guest star	3 July 1997
Loxton and Keane try to sift the truth from three conflicting stories when a severe case of bullying results in a fifteen-year-old boy being stabbed.
79	"Mid-Life Crisis"	Ross Devenish	Gregory Evans	John Cater, Leslee Udwin and Paul Herzberg guest star	4 July 1997
Daly and Skase discover that a jeweller is fencing stolen goods.
80	"Performing"	Chris Lovett	John Brennan	Rosie Marcel and Kelly Marcel guest star	8 July 1997
Boyden and Page come to the aid of a former porn actress who is worried that her younger sister faces a similar fate.
81	"Playing With Fire"	Jane Prowse	David G. McDonagh	Letitia Dean guest stars	10 July 1997
Meadows and Lines suspect that the owner of a beauty salon set it on fire herself to claim on the insurance policy.
82	"No Guarantees"	Pete Travis	Katharine Way	Laila Morse and Christopher Colquhoun guest star	11 July 1997
Rawton tries to stop a loan shark who is terrorising his female customers, but finds it hard to get the victims to talk
83	"Gentleman Jim"	Mike Vardy	Scott Cherry	WPC Jamila Blake is seconded to CID	15 July 1997
Blake is placed on attachment to CID. DC Carver, behind on his paperwork, is far from pleased when Blake drags him around Sun Hill following up leads on a trivial car theft case. Their investigations, however, lead them to a gang of armed robbers.
84	"Rift"	Pete Travis	Michael Jenner	Nick Conway guest stars	17 July 1997
Slater and Ackland attend to what appears to be a teenage catfight over an older man.
85	"Stand By Your Man"	Derek Lister	Isabelle Grey	—	18 July 1997
Daly tries to find out who is forcing a convict to smuggle drugs into a prison.
86	"Replica"	Michael Cocker	Rod Lewis	Nicholas Pinnock guest stars	22 July 1997
Loxton and McCann confiscate a gun.
87	"Mr Friday Night"	Mike Vardy	Len Collin	Amanda Holden and Paul Mark Elliott guest star	23 July 1997
Boyden and Page grill a witness after the disappearance of a good-time girl.
88	"Hitting the Nerve"	Brian Farnham	Renny Krupinski	Barbara Ewing, Fiona Dolman and Roger Allam guest star	25 July 1997
Greig and Carver react when one prosecution witness disappears and another ends up in a coma two days before the trial.
89	"Thicker Than Mud"	Ian White	Maxwell Young	Elizabeth Bennett and Andrew Scarborough guest star	29 July 1997
Deakin and Beech investigate an arson attack on a small, respectable clothes shop.
90	"Alternative Therapies"	Jane Prowse	Clive Dawson	Daniel Casey and Benedict Wong guest star	31 July 1997
Skase and Boulton investigate the theft of illegally imported body parts of endangered animals from a Chinese pharmacy.
91	"Foxed"	Nigel Bristow	Tony McHolland	First appearance of DC Tom Proctor; Jonathan Coy guest stars	1 August 1997
Daly and Carver investigate the burglary of an antiques shop and are struck by the strange behaviour of the sales assistant.
92	"These Foolish Things"	Peter Lydon	Mark Johnson	Sheree Murphy guest stars	5 August 1997
DCI Meadows leads an investigation into the snatching of a child from his pram and uncovers a case of extortion.
93	"Neighbours"	Nigel Bristow	Mark Holloway	Neil Maskell guest stars	7 August 1997
PC Garfield and WPC Keane try to settle a neighbourhood feud.
94	"Glass House"	Peter Lydon	Kevin Scouler	Margot Leicester and George Sweeney guest star	8 August 1997
DS Boulton and DC Lines try to persuade a woman to help catch her husband, who is involved in a drug deal.
95	"This Old Man"	Dominic Lees	Colin Wyatt	—	12 August 1997
Garfield is affected by the death of an old man.
96	"Tommy the Hero"	Mike Cocker	Chris Ould	James Ottaway and Frank Jarvis guest star	14 August 1997
WDC Rawton has to choose between solving a minor domestic dispute and finding two violent robbers.
97	"Driven To It"	Jo Shoop	Patrick Melaphany	—	15 August 1997
DS Daly enlists the help of a cab driver to catch a drug dealer.
98	"A Man Out Walking His Dog"	Jonathan Hacker	Terry Hodgkinson	Roger Walker, Christine Kavanagh and Roy Evans guest star	19 August 1997
Sgt Boyden and WPC Keane attend the scene of a possible suicide when a man's body is found in a car, poisoned by alcohol and exhaust fumes.
99	"Hunt"	Jonathan Hacker	Mark Illis	Patrick Murray and Mark Burdis guest star	21 August 1997
Sgt Boyden and DS Beech try to find a couple before a vicious drug-dealer gets to them.
100	"Has Anyone Here Seen Bigmouth?"	Jo Shoop	Ray Brooking	Anita Dobson, Sharon Small and Del Henney guest star	22 August 1997
DS Daly and DI Deakin try to find an informant who has disappeared following a failed police operation.
101	"This Land Is Ours"	Brian Farnham	Hugh Ellis	Philip McGough and Allan Surtees guest star	26 August 1997
Sgt Cryer and Ch Supt Brownlow police a demonstration at a development site after peaceful protesters are threatened with violence.
102	"Paying the Piper"	Brian Farnham	Sheila Duncan	—	28 August 1997
DS Boulton's investigation is hampered by an informant who is putting family loyalty first.
103	"On the Hurry Up"	Mike Cocker	Richard Stoneman	—	29 August 1997
When a flying bottle causes Slater to crash a panda, Monroe bans all pandas from responding to priority calls, a move that leads to frustration amongst the relief. Slater is suspicious as to why Loxton won't assist him in the investigation into a series of hoax calls linked to his crash.
104	"Not in the Script"	Ian White	Robert Jones	—	2 September 1997
When Slater is recommended by Rawton for undercover work, he is overjoyed. His colleagues, however, ridicule him, and their interference almost costs them a trial operation. Will he bottle it?
105	"Flower Power"	Nicholas Laughland	Elizabeth Anne-Wheal	Michael McKell guest stars	4 September 1997
PC Hollis discovers a hoard of illegally imported wildflower bulbs and helps in the subsequent Customs and Excise operation.
106	"A Breach of Trust, Part One"	Nicholas Laughland	Maxwell Young	Jacqueline Defferary guest stars	5 September 1997
Daly's worst fears are realised when a nurse reports that she has received malicious phone calls from a mentally-disturbed ex-prisoner.
107	"A Breach of Trust, Part Two"	Nicholas Laughland	Maxwell Young	Jacqueline Defferary and Anna Manahan guest star	9 September 1997
Daly and Blake are forced to release their prime suspect, and the race is on to prove his guilt before he strikes again.
108	"Fool"	Simon Meyers	Spenser Frearson	—	11 September 1997
PC Quinnan and Sgt Boyden want to use a would-be stand-up comedian as an informant, but he is as hopeless off-stage as he is on.
109	"Armed and Dangerous"	Simon Massey	Tunde Babalola	—	12 September 1997
PC McCann is convinced that a gun remains unaccounted for when a gang of armed robbers is captured.
110	"Animals"	Dominic Lees	Steve Handley	Ged Simmons and Derek Riddell guest star	16 September 1997
Ackland and Blake investigate the dangerous world of dog fighting - full of vicious dogs and hard men.
111	"Look into My Eyes"	Chris Lovett	Tom Needham	—	18 September 1997
DI Deakin and WPC Blake follow up allegations of attempted rape against a stage hypnotist.
112	"Performance Anxiety"	Christopher Hodson	J.C. Wilsher	Jenny McCracken, Desmond Askew and Linda Hayden guest star	19 September 1997
Sun Hill's performance comes under scrutiny, and officers from CID and uniform compete against each other in a bid to solve the most crimes.
113	"Different Strokes"	Nicholas Laughland	Isabelle Grey	Karl Collins guest stars	23 September 1997
PC Slater goes undercover in an attempt to draw out a thief. Notes: Karl Collins would join the cast as DC Danny Glaze in 1999.
114	"Sparks"	Brian Farnham	Peter J Hammond	David Quilter, Maureen O'Brien and Brian Capron guest star	25 September 1997
DS Beech loses his cool with a DS from Severn Valley, while Skase falls for the charms of his WDC.
115	"The Lion's Den"	Simon Meyers	Barry Simner	Sally Ann Matthews and Paul Angelis guest star	26 September 1997
Slater goes undercover as a bouncer at a club run by the notorious Guy Walsh. As Slater gains his trust, will he be exposed?
116	"The Needs of the Many"	Chris Lovett	Clive Dawson	—	30 September 1997
PC Slater is surprised when, in uniform, he bumps into the target of his undercover investigation.
117	"Cross Purposes"	Ged Maguire	Edwin Pearce	Tony Selby and Sheila Dunn guest star	2 October 1997
DS Boulton and Sgt Boyden both have an interest in the same pub landlord, but for different reasons.
118	"Free to Speak?"	Christopher Hodson	Richard Stoneman	Final appearance of PC Nick Slater	3 October 1997
It's PC Slater's final day at Sun Hill, and he takes Keane out for a farewell dinner. Loxton, Quinnan and Skase do their best to extinguish any intimate moments.
119	"Dishonour Among Thieves"	Ged Maguire	Terry Hodgkinson	June Page guest stars	7 October 1997
Sgt Boyden deals with a complaint from a notorious burglar who has had his own house broken into.
120	"Coup de Grace"	Tim Holloway	Nicholas McInerny	Di Botcher and Philip Wright guest star	9 October 1997
DS Boulton finds himself trying to save a marriage when the husband is given another three-year sentence.
121	"Night of the Long Knives"	Brian Parker	Scott Cherry	Jason Salkey guest stars	10 October 1997
The relief are furious at working in endless shifts, especially when Keane, Loxton and Jarvis have called in sick. Its Garfield's duty as Fed Rep to sort things out, when an evening turns from bad to worse.
122	"Straying"	James Cellan Jones	Rod Beacham	Peter Gunn and John Normington guest star	14 October 1997
WPC Page and PC Stamp look into the disappearance of a man and his dog. DS Beech and DC Carver act on info received about an alleged robbery.
123	"A Bad Lot"	Ian White	Chris Lang	—	16 October 1997
PC Garfield deals with a twelve-year-old boy who is running amok on a housing estate.
124	"Crimes of a Lesser Passion"	James Cellan Jones	Tunde Babalola	—	17 October 1997
Sgt Ackland and PC Jarvis deal with a stabbing.
125	"Force"	Michael Ferguson	Carolyn Sally Jones	David Quilter and Luisa Bradshaw-White guest star	21 October 1997
Insp Monroe responds to suggestions that he is out of touch with front-line policing and goes on the beat with PC Jarvis.
126	"Walkabout"	Brian Parker	Peter J. Hammond	Thomas Craig guest stars	23 October 1997
WPC Page assists a missing person's enquiry by impersonating the young woman in question.
127	"Shades of Grey, Part One"	Danny Hiller	Manjit Singh	Ace Bhatti and Nicola Stephenson guest star	24 October 1997
DI Deakin and DS Boulton lead the search for two children who are snatched from school and presumed to be on their way back to Pakistan with their estranged father.
128	"Shades of Grey, Part Two"	Danny Hiller	Manjit Singh	Ace Bhatti and Nicola Stephenson guest star	28 October 1997
DI Deakin and DS Boulton are on the trail of the kidnapper, but the children's father has decided to pay the ransom money.
129	"Women at Work"	John Bruce	Patrick Melaphany	—	30 October 1997
DC Carver and WPC Blake investigate the hit-and-run of a woman employed by a jealous lover to test her man's fidelity.
130	"Solid Evidence"	Tania Diez	Candy Denman	Wil Johnson guest stars.	31 October 1997
Insp Monroe leads the search for a little girl who has disappeared after school, and whose mother is a prostitute and father a pimp.
131	"Going Down"	Jo Shoop	Spenser Frearson	Colin Baker guest stars	4 November 1997
WDC Croft feels let down by the parents of a young drug addict who had promised to keep him clean.
132	"Accomplice"	Derek Lister	Tony Mulholland	Hour-long episode; WPC Jamila Blake returns to uniform; Nicholas Murchie guest stars	6 November 1997
The abduction of a girl bears the hallmarks of a serial killer whom Carver helped to put away years ago. Did he work alone?
133	"Last Fare"	Jo Shoop	Richard McBrien	Sally Faulkner and Biddy Hodson guest star	7 November 1997
DS Beech and WDC Rawton investigate the assault and robbery of a minicab driver.
134	"Stolen Thunder"	John Bruce	Stephen Plaice	Mark Wing-Davey guest stars	11 November 1997
DI Deakin and DC Proctor are furious that an inexperienced young barrister has been assigned to prosecute one of their court cases.
135	"P.C."	Ian White	Richard Stoneman	—	13 November 1997
Loxton carries out an illegal stop-and-search of a black man, unaware that he is an off-duty police officer. This episode is sometimes referred to, misleadingly, as "P.C., Part One" as it is the first part of a two-part story, with "No Trace" as the second part.
136	"No Trace"	Tania Diez	Richard Stoneman	Final regular appearance of PC Steve Loxton; Pauline Melville guest stars	14 November 1997
A disenchanted Steve Loxton decides to resign from the force for good, but before he goes, he helps Quinnan settle a score with a crooked lawyer. This episode is sometimes referred to, misleadingly, as "No Trace, Part Two" as it is the second part of a two-part story, with "P.C." as the first part.
137	"A New Way to Pay Old Debts"	Albert Barber	Len Collin	Freddie Earlle guest stars	18 November 1997
Sgt Boyden and WPC Blake investigate the death of an alcoholic found burned to death.
138	"After All These Years"	Tim Holloway	Lisa Evans	Veronica Roberts and Roy Heather guest star	20 November 1997
Sgt Ackland and PC Quinnan investigate a car crash involving an elderly driver.
139	"Sands of Time"	Albert Barber	Anthony Valentine	Paul Jerricho guest stars	21 November 1997
As the threat of tenure looms over DC Jim Carver, he is desperate to prove himself to Meadows by capturing a jewel thief who absconded years ago.
140	"Identity Crisis"	James Hawes	Mark Clompus	John Axon, Stuart Laing and Colette Brown guest star	25 November 1997
DS Boulton pressurises a young couple in the hope of getting a result.
141	"The Same Stripe, Part One"	Chris Lovett	Elizabeth Anne-Wheal	James Marcus and JoAnne Good guest star	28 November 1997
Ackland finds herself under investigation for accepting bribes.
142	"The Same Stripe, Part Two"	Chris Lovett	Elizabeth Anne-Wheal	JoAnne Good guest stars	2 December 1997
Ackland is behind bars on a charge of accepting bribes, and her trusted informant has disappeared without trace.
143	"Hot Plastic"	Harry Bradbeer	Gregory Evans	—	4 December 1997
DI Deakin tries to salvage an operation after an unsuccessful raid in which Sgt Cryer is scalded, DC Skase is injured, and the target escaped.
144	"Gaybashing"	Michael Ferguson	Simon Tyrell	Hannah Waterman guest stars	5 December 1997
Sgt Boyden and PC Quinnan investigate an assault in a public toilet, a notorious meeting place for homosexuals.
145	"Potential For Conflict"	Catherine Morshead	Neil Clarke	First appearance of PC Luke Ashton; Geoffrey McGivern and Dominic Power guest star	9 December 1997
Stamp visits Hendon for new recruit Luke Ashton's last day of training. But Ashton's confidence takes a severe knock, and he might not pass the course.
146	"Heartbreak Hotel"	Ged Maguire	Alan Pollock	Jane Wall guest stars	11 December 1997
DI Deakin and WDC Rawton investigate the assault of a man who has been charming middle-aged women out of their savings. Notes: Jane Wall would join the cast as PC Di Worrall in 1999.
147	"Humpty Dumpty, Part One"	Ian White	Tom Needham	—	12 December 1997
Ashton has a bad first day at Sun Hill when he and Stamp see a boy fall from the roof of a building.
148	"Humpty Dumpty, Part Two"	Ian White	Tom Needham	Rik Mayall and Roy Holder guest star	16 December 1997
Cryer remains convinced that Jimmy's fall off the roof was not an accident. But who pushed him - and is his death linked to the attack on Bannerman?
149	"Humpty Dumpty, Part Three"	Ian White	Tom Needham.	Rik Mayall guest stars	18 December 1997
All evidence points to Jimmy's father killing Bannerman and then pushing his son off the roof. But can Cryer and Ashton find a way to prove it?
150	"Out"	Harry Bradbeer	Tony Mulholland	Jason Merrells guest stars	19 December 1997
DS Daly puts the pressure on an ex-con who would risk another jail sentence rather than inform on a friend.
151	"Twanky"	Mike Cocker	Mark Holloway	Hour-long episode	22 December 1997
Putting on a Christmas panto proves to be the toughest case of the year for Page and the officers at Sun Hill.
152	"Things That Go Bump in the Night"	Gill Wilkinson	Terry Hodgkinson	Final episode produced by Michael Chapman; first appearance of PC Sam Harker; Timothy Bateson guest stars	30 December 1997
Sgt Boyden and WPC Page find a notorious safecracker, blown up and in a semi-conscious state, in a dilapidated building.
