= The Bill series 12 =

The Bill
- Series 12
- No. of episodes: 156

Release
- Original network: ITV
- Original release: 2 January – 31 December 1996

Series chronology
- ← Previous; Series 11 Next → Series 13

The twelfth series of The Bill, a British television drama, consists of 156 episodes, broadcast between 2 January and 31 December 1996.

On 6 February 2013, The Bill Series 12 Part 1 and 2 and The Bill Series 12 Part 3 and 4 DVD sets were released in Australia.

== Storylines ==
The show aired the death of PC Cathy Marshall early in the series, actress Lynne Miller departing after seven years in a mysterious plot that saw her drown whilst chasing a suspect, but it was never confirmed if she was pushed or slipped off a riverside barge during the pursuit. The death followed that of WDS Jo Morgan in a four-part special towards the end of the previous series, with the first three of the four episodes rebroadcast in the summer as part of a single special episode, Target.

There was also an exit for WPC Donna Harris, as the role of collator was replaced by a computerised system. Two other characters departed, with Robert Perkins leaving his role as Sergeant Ray Steele after almost three years, with WPC June Ackland taking the role of Sergeant after six months as an Acting Sergeant. Tom Cotcher also left the role of DC Alan Woods, being replaced by WDC Liz Rawton, with actress Libby Davison joining the show permanently just four months after making a guest appearance as Briony Richards. Rawton's arrival to CID was preceded by that of DS Geoff Daly, portrayed by Ray Ashcroft, in June. WPC Jamila Blake arrived at the end of the year to replace WPC Marshall, Lolita Chakrabarti taking on the role after two guest appearances earlier in the series as Dr. Sally Vole.

== Cast changes ==
=== Arrivals ===
- DS Geoff Daly (Episode 67–)
- WDC Liz Rawton (Episode 107–)
- WPC Jamila Blake (Episode 156–)

=== Departures ===
- WPC Cathy Marshall – Drowned whilst chasing a suspect
- WPC Donna Harris – Unexplained; exit preceded by elimination of collator role
- Sgt Ray Steele – Unexplained
- DC Alan Woods – Transferred

== Episodes ==
No. in series	Title	Directed by	Written by	Episode notes	Original release date
1	"Call Waiting"	John Bruce	Simon Moss	Susannah Wise guest stars	2 January 1996
Skase and Croft investigate a series of hoax phone calls that are tearing a family apart.
2	"Second Sense"	Diana Patrick	Peter Gibbs	Cheryl Hall guest stars	4 January 1996
Loxton and Slater deal with a woman drink-driver.
3	"Runners Up"	Nick Laughland	Robert Jones	Tracey Childs guest stars	5 January 1996
Meadows offers a bottle of scotch as a reward for catching an elusive burglar.
4	"Keeping It in the Family"	Frank W. Smith	Tony Lindsay	Nicholas Pinnock and Lloyd McGuire guest star	9 January 1996
Lines and Skase try to avert an ice-cream war in Sun Hill after a vendor is assaulted.
5	"Home Truths"	June Howson	Katharine Way	Danny Dyer guest stars	11 January 1996
Ackland and Jarvis follow up a vicious assault.
6	"Outer"	Nick Laughland	J. C. Wilsher	Rhona Mitra guest stars	12 January 1996
Boulton is determined to arrest a local drug dealer, at any cost.
7	"Better Half"	Catherine Morshead	Jonathan David	Nigel Humphreys guest stars	16 January 1996
Beech and Croft investigate the murder of a hairdresser who had been fighting for a share of her dead fiancé's estate.
8	"No Assistance Required"	Robin Sheppard	Richard Stoneman	Neil Stuke guest stars	18 January 1996
Datta is called to a burglary and is subjected to the unwanted affections of a civic-minded admirer. Monroe is suspicious when Loxton tries to settle an old score.
9	"Judgement Call"	Martin Hutchings	Julian Spilsbury	Hour-long special; final appearance of WPC Cathy Marshall; Tina Hobley, Nicholas Ball and Clive Carter guest star	19 January 1996
What begins as a routine night for the officers at Sun Hill ends in personal tragedy.
10	"Old Dogs, New Tricks"	Frank W. Smith	Jonathan Myerson	—	23 January 1996
As Sun Hill gets to grips with its new computer system, Boyden discovers that it pays to stay one step ahead of the opposition.
11	"Worst Fears: Part 1"	Robin Shepperd	Richard Stoneman	Clare Holman guest stars	25 January 1996
While Deakin investigates the kidnapping of a five-year-old boy, Conway gets some unsettling news.
12	"One Night With You: Part 2"	Derek Lister	Chris Ould	—	26 January 1996
Five-year-old Tommy Laker is still missing, and Deakin discovers an evil and sinister ring which may hold the clue.
13	"Someone Else's Problem"	John Bruce	Renny Krupinski	Richard Beale guest stars	30 January 1996
Datta and Quinnan look into the mysterious death of a jogger, while Ackland and Jarvis try to reconcile a couple of warring lovers.
14	"Bounds of Decency"	Corin Campbell Hill	Avril E. Russell	—	1 February 1996
Slater and Garfield struggle to keep the peace when two women fall out over the same man.
15	"Happy Birthday"	Sarah Harding	Tom Needham	—	2 February 1996
Meadows and Croft investigate the murder of an elderly woman, and question two young children living on the floor below who may have heard what happened.
16	"Stop the Music"	Sarah Harding	Margaret Ousby	Sharon Duncan-Brewster and Ayesha Antoine guest star	6 February 1996
Croft and a badly-hungover Beech investigate when a body is found in a car with a large amount of crack cocaine.
17	"Cold Light of Day"	Corin Campbell Hill	David G. McDonagh	—	8 February 1996
A reconstruction brings forward an unexpected witness to an assault on a 15-year-old boy.
18	"Back in Business"	Laurence Moody	Peter Gibbs	Ch Supt Charles Brownlow returns from Area; A/Supt Derek Conway returns to Ch Insp	9 February 1996
Acting Superintendent Conway is stirred into action by a face from the past.
19	"Separate Rooms"	Jan Sargent	Nick Crittenden	Camilla Power and Ewen Bremner guest star	13 February 1996
Lines investigates an allegation of underage sex.
20	"Going Guilty"	James Hawes	Mark Holloway	—	15 February 1996
Cryer and Slater follow up on a murder but a legal loophole may allow the perpetrator to get away with it.
21	"Pieces of Cake"	Derek Lister	Maxwell Young	—	16 February 1996
Beech is caught in the crossfire when uniform and CID fall out over a directive from Brownlow.
22	"Somebody's Home"	Jan Sargent	Simon Tyrrell	—	20 February 1996
Quinnan and Keane have to help someone with a conviction for assaulting a police officer.
23	"Pointing the Finger"	Simon Meyers	Edwin Pearce	Ron Donachie guest stars	22 February 1996
Carver and Skase investigate an assault on an Asian schoolboy.
24	"Boy Meets Girl"	James Hawes	Simon Moss	Lloyd Owen guest stars	23 February 1996
Croft investigates a series of vicious sexual assaults.
25	"Confession"	David Richards	Terry Hodgkinson	Hour-long episode; final appearance of WPC Donna Harris, guest appearance of DS Danny Pearce; David Westhead guest stars	27 February 1996
Meadows and Carver have to look again at a man cleared of murder.
26	"Home From Home"	June Howson	Stephen McAteer	—	29 February 1996
Stamp and Slater are called to supervise the eviction of a father from his home.
27	"Open Wound"	John Bruce	Tom Needham	—	1 March 1996
Skase and Deakin deal with a wounded crack dealer shot in the yard of a pub.
28	"Perfect Match"	Laurence Moody	Carolyn Sally Jones	—	5 March 1996
Beech and Croft try to track down a violent attacker.
29	"Someone Special"	Gwennan Sage	Carolyn Sally Jones	Bruce Alexander guest stars	7 March 1996
Lines and Skase investigate a possible arson attack on a nightclub.
30	"Bits and Pieces"	Simon Meyers	Terry Hodgkinson	Amanda Ryan, Lucy Benjamin and Peter Benson guest star	8 March 1996
Boyden and Slater search for the owner of a severed hand found on a rubbish tip.
31	"Home Help"	Michael Simpson	Peter Mills	Angela Bruce guest stars	12 March 1996
Cryer and Slater handle a tricky case involving a disabled former police officer and his wayward son.
32	"Kicked Out"	Michael Ferguson	Stephen C. Handley	—	14 March 1996
Jarvis and Page are called in to help in the deportation of an illegal immigrant who escapes from custody.
33	"On the Block"	Michael Ferguson	J. C. Wilsher	Kenneth Watson guest stars	15 March 1996
Boulton loses a suspect during an arrest and has to ask Monroe to help get him back.
34	"Getting Off"	Michael Cocker	Graham Mitchell	—	19 March 1996
Boulton investigates a convicted drug addict and clashes with a drugs worker.
35	"Girls' Night"	Gill Wilkinson	Gwyneth Hughes	—	21 March 1996
Loxton and Page deal with a bridegroom who disrupts a hen night.
36	"Blood Brothers"	Jeremy Silberston	Manjit Singh	Roshan Seth guest stars	22 March 1996
Meadows tries to get the truth from a terminally-ill Asian man after one of his sons is fatally injured during a family dispute.
37	"Broken Homes"	Robert Del Maestro	Gregory Evans	WPC June Ackland is promoted to Acting Sergeant (off screen)	23 March 1996
Loxton and Keane chase a local tearaway, who gets injured. Conway has to deal with the resulting accusations of police harassment.
38	"A Hornet's Nest"	Robert Del Maestro	Candy Denman	Melanie Kilburn guest stars	28 March 1996
Greig is accused with police brutality following a raid on a burglar's home.
39	"Dead of Night"	Ian White	Julian Jones	First appearance of June Ackland as A/Sgt; Rosie Cavaliero guest stars	29 March 1996
Quinnan's whereabouts are questioned when he fails to notice an injured woman on the station doorstep. June Ackland becomes acting Sergeant.
40	"Party Pooper"	James Hawes	Isabelle Grey	Daniel Casey guest stars	2 April 1996
Slater's ability is questioned when he appears to mishandle two violent thugs at a party and his wallet, containing his warrant card, is stolen.
41	"More Haste"	Jeremy Silberston	David Hoskins	—	4 April 1996
Keane has a bad day in court, while Monroe follows up on a domestic incident.
42	"Beating the Odds"	Ian White	Edwin Pearce	Jamie Glover, Freddie Earlle and Amelia Curtis guest star	5 April 1996
Boulton investigates a notorious local bookie and prompts suspicions about Beech's private life.
43	"Animal"	Kate Cheeseman	Tom Needham	Ian Reddington and Sheree Murphy guest star	9 April 1996
Boyden and Datta try to secure a conviction against a vicious pimp.
44	"Dangerous Game"	Brian Parker	Elizabeth-Anne Wheal	Hour-long episode; final appearance of Sgt Ray Steele; Tracey Wilkinson guest stars	10 April 1996
Boulton, Carver and Deakin take part in a Flying Squad operation against a vicious gang of armed robbers.
45	"Dancers"	Nick Laughland	Mark Holloway	Tenniel Evans and Ray Armstrong guest star	12 April 1996
Brownlow organises a tea dance for the Metropolitan Police Pensioners' and Widows' Society.
46	"And Nothing But"	Michael Simpson	Richard Stoneman	—	16 April 1996
Loxton arrests a black man he suspects is responsible for a mugging and is accused of racism.
47	"Tale of Two Cities"	Tom Cotter	Spenser Frearson	Petra Markham guest stars	18 April 1996
Greig is in pursuit of a local drug dealer. Two teenagers arrested for possession refuse to provide any information about their supplier.
48	"Cheating"	Kate Cheeseman	Spenser Frearson	Leslie Phillips and Carol Royle guest star	19 April 1996
Quinnan and Hollis have to decide whether a pub quiz champion is breaking the rules. Skase deals with the unfaithful wife of a local villain.
49	"Decent Proposals"	Gill Wilkinson	Jonathan Myerson	Clare Cathcart and Trevor Cooper guest star	23 April 1996
Loxton and Quinnan investigate an employment agency that provides lucrative opportunities to women with financial troubles.
50	"Going For a Song"	Martin Hutchings	Julian Spilsbury	Guest appearance of now-DS Mike Dashwood	25 April 1996
Carver calls on a former colleague to help with an antique clock that is a target for theft.
51	"Value Added"	Simon Meyers	Barry Simner	Malcolm Terris and Geff Francis guest stars	26 April 1996
Hollis goes undercover in the seedy world of vice in pursuit of the unscrupulous owner of a clip joint.
52	"Professional Ethics"	Chris Lovett	David Hoskins	John Bowler guest stars	30 April 1996
Greig and Lines investigate graffiti attacks on motor vehicles and uncover a fraud.
53	"Accidents Will Happen"	Tom Cotter	David G. McDonagh	Paul Ritter guest stars	2 May 1996
Boyden and Page look into a protection racket.
54	"Time Spent"	Chris Lovett	Chris Ould	—	3 May 1996
Beech uncovers the relationship between a former boss and a local crime lord. Carver is caught between two troubled lovers.
55	"Conspiracy of Silence"	Peter Barber-Fleming	Margaret Phelan	Ann Davies guest stars	7 May 1996
Deakin and Boulton investigate a fatal stabbing and uncover jealousy and deceit.
56	"Cold Feet and Hot Coffee"	Gwennan Sage	Julian Perkins	Jason Done and Stephen Churchett guest star	9 May 1996
Loxton and Page go undercover at a wedding to prevent a jilted lover spoiling the bride's big day.
57	"Rollover"	Michael Simpson	Nick Crittenden	Libby Davison and Philip Wright guest star	10 May 1996
Deakin comes down hard on a snout who tries to buck the system, and gets an unexpected result. Notes: Libby Davidson would join the cast as WDC Liz Rawton in September.
58	"Tough Love"	Martin Hutchings	Katharine Way	John Michie guest stars	14 May 1996
Hollis and Garfield deal with an attack on a school bully.
59	"With This Ring"	Nick Laughland	John Brennan	Roger Avon and Rowena Cooper guest star	16 May 1996
Keane comes across a suspect antiques dealer. Greig and Croft investigate a burglary and reopen a feud between two sisters.
60	"Final Drive"	Michael Ferguson	Mark Holloway	Thomas Craig and Sukie Smith guest star	17 May 1996
Jarvis is on the Advanced Driving Course at Hendon.
61	"Voices"	Moira Armstrong	Peter J. Hammond	Sian Thomas and David Quilter guest star	21 May 1996
Datta and Greig suspect that a woman who claims she can hear voices may hold the key to a series of sexual assaults.
62	"Party On"	Danny Hiller	Mark Illis	Hilary Whitehall guest stars.	23 May 1996
Deakin and Croft have to deal with a gang of delinquents when one of them is bottled at an ecstasy party.
63	"Hard Enough"	Dominic Lees	Lyndon Mallett	Elizabeth Berrington and Adrian Rawlins guest star	24 May 1996
Boulton and Carver clash when a householder is arrested for murdering a burglar with a baseball bat. Boulton thinks it is justified to kill an intruder, but Carver does not; will it impede their investigation?
64	"Cuckoo"	Danny Hiller	Nicholas McInerny	Honeysuckle Weeks, Olivia Hallinan and Campbell Morrison guest star	28 May 1996
Page and Monroe are dragged into a family squabble.
65	"Helping Hands"	Peter Duffell	Clive Dawson	Aidan J. David guest stars	30 May 1996
Datta and Garfield arrest a G.P. for possession of cannabis, but he claims it is for use by one of his patients.
66	"Jekyll and Hyde"	Danny Hiller	Edwin Pearce	Matthew Crompton guest stars	31 May 1996
Brownlow witnesses a violent outburst on the road. Notes: Matthew Crompton would join the cast as PC Sam Harker in 1997.
67	"Knocking on the Door"	John Bruce	Steve Handley	First appearance of DS Geoff Daly	4 June 1996
New DS Geoff Daly steps in to help Skase when a straightforward drugs bust goes wrong.
68	"Lies and Statistics"	James Hawes	Elizabeth-Anne Wheal	Sean Gilder and David Quilter guest star	6 June 1996
Boyden tries to help a young offender.
69	"Butting In"	Michael Simpson	Sebastian Secker Walker	Barry Jackson, David Quilter and Lolita Chakrabarti guest star	7 June 1996
Jarvis steps in to help Page deal with a violent attack, but there are complications. Notes: Lolita Chakrabarti would join the cast as WPC Jamila Blake at the end of the year.
70	"The Bagman"	Michael Cocker	Richard McBrien	—	11 June 1996
Deakin investigates a violent attack on a small-time crook whom he suspects to have fallen in with bad company.
71	"Overstepping the Mark"	John Bruce	Michael Jenner	Kris Marshall and David Quilter guest star	13 June 1996
Lines tries to get a juvenile offender to inform on a gang of dangerous thugs, while Daly is troubled by a determined probation officer.
72	"Filth"	Jo Shoop	Graham Mitchell	—	20 June 1996
Deakin and Boulton investigate when a pimp is discovered badly beaten in a pile of rubbish.
73	"Camper"	Moira Armstrong	Terry Hodgkinson	Timothy Bateson and Avril Elgar guest star	21 June 1996
Slater and Boyden are involved in a drugs bust involving a camper van.
74	"Spill"	John Strickland	Michael Jenner	Hour-long episode; Lolita Chakrabarti and Bob Mason guest star	25 June 1996
A tanker crashes, spilling a potentially lethal load near a housing estate. Monroe supervises the evacuation of the area.
75	"Apron Strings"	Adrian J. Fearnley	Len Collin	Denyse Alexander guest stars	27 June 1996
Cryer and Keane discover a woman dead in her bath and suspect her son of foul play.
76	"One Step Ahead"	Simon Massey	Candy Denman	Ken Hutchison and Roy Skelton guest star	28 June 1996
Meadows and Skase pursue an ex-convict who has sworn revenge on an informant. Boyden is called to help a prostitute who believes she is being followed.
77	"Starting Young"	Michael Ferguson	Andrew Rattenbury	Nathan Constance guest stars	2 July 1996
Jarvis and Keane deal with a boy in possession of a pensioner's prescription.
78	"Tart's Cards"	Simon Meyers	Margaret Ousby	Annie Hulley guest stars	4 July 1996
Boyden and Slater investigate a series of offensive telephone calls.
79	"Born Again"	Robin Sheppard	Simon Frith	Alexandra Gilbreath and Chris Tranchell guest stars	5 July 1996
Boulton investigates an assault on an old man.
80	"Kick Me Hard"	Audrey Cooke	Gregory Evans	—	9 July 1996
Daly mounts an operation to catch muggers. Page goes undercover as a pregnant woman to act as bait.
81	"All or Nothing"	Adrian J. Fearnley	Philip Kingston	—	11 July 1996
Quinnan and Keane discover the body of a young girl in a pub toilet. Meanwhile, Monroe and Stamp both have words with Slater about his extensive overtime.
82	"Unlucky in Love"	Jo Shoop	Jonathan Rich	Anna Keaveney and Joanne Froggatt guest star	12 July 1996
Boyden investigates a dating agency that is rumoured to be providing underage girls.
83	"A Quick Return"	Brian Parker	Stephen McAteer	—	16 July 1996
Cryer and Keane investigate a series of street robberies and find four teenagers trying to buy their way into drug-dealing.
84	"Sartorial Elegance"	Simon Massey	Nigel Baldwin	Joseph Kpobie guest stars	18 July 1996
Carver and Jarvis misjudge the condition of a witness, threatening Operation Eagle Eye.
85	"Don't Leave Me This Way"	Ian White	Graham White	Albert Welling and Margo Gunn guest star	19 July 1996
Loxton and Keane follow up a mugging but suspect that the victim knows more than she is letting on.
86	"Big Bullies"	Michael Simpson	Ron Rose	Jim McManus guest stars	23 July 1996
Monroe investigates a schoolboy's claim that he was assaulted by his teacher.
87	"Playing It by the Rules"	Chris Lovett	Sheila Duncan	—	25 July 1996
Deakin is handed the chance to bust a drug dealer when his wife turns informant.
88	"True Colours"	Brian Parker	Elizabeth-Anne Wheal	—	26 July 1996
Daly is determined to find out why a white teenager is trying to take the blame for his black friends.
89	"Target"	John Strickland	Edward Canford-Dumas	Feature length rebroadcast of the episodes "Fire", "All Tucked Up" and "Bait" from Series 11	29 July 1996
While speaking to Ackland and Loxton about the problem of local dog mess, a woman is shot dead by a sniper. Meadows and his CID team are tasked to investigate, and suspect that the woman was not the intended target, and it is strongly possible the sniper was after Loxton, who is set to testify in court against an attempted murderer that afternoon. However, when Ackland's house is set alight that night, CID come to the conclusion that she is the intended target. Writing up a list of possible suspects, Ackland gets sucked into a deadly cat-and-mouse game to try to draw the killer out – resulting in the death of one of Sun Hill's best officers.
90	"Dead Man's Hand"	Dominic Lees	Simon Tyrrell	Jamie Foreman guest stars	30 July 1996
Beech investigates the claim of one compulsive gambler to have murdered another.
91	"For Their Own Good"	Peter Duffell	Nigel Baldwin	Final appearance of DC Alan Woods; Lynn Farleigh and Billy McColl guest star	1 August 1996
Boulton uses an informant as the bait to catch a dangerous villain.
92	"Theory and Practice"	Peter Barber-Fleming	Maxwell Young	Kacey Ainsworth guest stars	6 August 1996
Ackland and McCann take the sergeant's exam. Cryer deals with a woman who is miscarrying and claims that she was assaulted by Page.
93	"Drinking Partners"	Peter Lydon	Matthew Wingett	Tony Marshall guest stars	8 August 1996
Greig and Skase investigate when a drunk man is found unconscious and badly injured at the bottom of a flight of stairs.
94	"Lean on Me"	Simon Meyers	Barry Simner	Madeleine Howard guest stars	9 August 1996
Hollis gets ideas above his station when Barbara, a local tom with whom he has become friendly, tries to become his informant. Although Barbara claims that known fraudster David Gough is back out on the patch, Hollis struggles to convince Deakin and Meadows.
95	"Reminders"	Chris Lovett	Michael Jenner	Vas Blackwood, Laurie Brett and Ricci Harnett guest star	13 August 1996
Hours after his release from prison, Dael Abbott is hauled back into custody by Daly and Carver following a stabbing. Daly pressures Emma Gilmore, the girlfriend of Abbott's associate, Michael Ceely, into giving evidence.
96	"Minding"	Nick Laughland	Mark Holloway	Charlotte Barker guest stars	15 August 1996
Loxton and Keane arrest a woman for shoplifting, and later bail her from custody when she openly admits to the charge. But when she is discovered to have given a false identity, Greig and Croft link the incident to a nanny believed to have kidnapped two of her charges.
97	"Follow the Van"	Robin Sheppard	Stephen Plaice	Donald Douglas guest stars	16 August 1996
A robbery on a garage forecourt leads Beech and Lines to the door of convicted robber Ricky Baines, but Baines' innocence is seemingly confirmed when a second robbery takes place whilst he is being interviewed – but Beech remains determined not to let him off the hook.
98	"Don't Kill the Messenger"	Jim Shields	Isabelle Grey	—	20 August 1996
Jarvis and Cryer attend the coroner's hearing following a death in custody, but when both are exonerated and cleared of any wrongdoing, the victim's son sends Jarvis a death threat and slashes his tyres after refusing to believe that his father was a sex offender.
99	"Junior"	Jim Shields	Julian Perkins	Trevor Byfield and Elizabeth McKechnie guest star	22 August 1996
When fifteen-year-old Mickey Hoyle is arresting for joyriding, Beech employs him as a snout to expose a crooked car ring run by the Hislop brothers, Wayne and Paul. DS Frank Thomas from Scotland Yard assists Beech and a less than impressed Lines with the investigation.
100	"Pony Express"	Simon Meyers	David G. McDonagh	Andy Linden and Ade Sapara guest star	23 August 1996
Deakin has to decide whether to trust a Nigerian drug smuggler who offers to help catch a local dealer.
101	"Out of Control"	Ian White	Edwin Pearce	David Hargreaves and Lucy Speed guest star	27 August 1996
Jarvis deals with a young tearaway and tries to persuade the boy's father to take responsibility for his son's actions. Notes: Lucy Speed would join the cast as DC, later DS, Stevie Moss in 2008.
102	"Day Tripper"	Gill Wilkinson	Chris Smyth	—	29 August 1996
Greig hopes that a tip-off will help him to nail an old enemy but things don't go to plan.
103	"Waiting for Frank"	Robert Del Maestro	Chris Ould	Jonathan Phillips guest stars	30 August 1996
Deakin poses as a nervous punter waiting at the dog track to meet a mysterious man named Frank.
104	"A Day in the Life"	Audrey Cooke	Robert Jones	Kulvinder Ghir, Jack Deam and Maxine Evans guest star	3 September 1996
Keane is held hostage by a desperate armed robber.
105	"Second Chances"	Nick Laughland	Manjit Singh	Paul Bhattacharjee guest stars	5 September 1996
Deakin gets a vital lead on an unsolved murder, but his witness is an illegal immigrant who is about to be deported.
106	"Repossession"	Peter Lydon	Lyndon Mallet	Gerry Cowper, Jan Pearson and Lorcan Cranitch guest star	6 September 1996
A petrol can, a lighter and a desperate man threatening to burn down a house. Can Conway talk him round?
107	"Liar"	Michael Simpson	Spenser Frearson	First appearance of DC Liz Rawton; Elizabeth Bennett guest stars	10 September 1996
Rawton gets involved in a dispute between a drug addict and Croft, who is trying to find a witness who can testify that she was assaulted.
108	"Detained"	Ken Horn	Jimmy Gardner	Scott Neal and Sara Stockbridge guest star	12 September 1996
Garfield and McCann investigate a vicious mugging. Notes: Scott Neal would join the cast as PC Luke Ashton in 1997.
109	"Karma"	Brian Parker	Edward Canford-Dumas	Jim Norton guest stars	13 September 1996
Deakin and Boulton are called into a women's prison to investigate claims by an officer that an inmate was pushed down a flight of stairs by the prison psychiatrist.
110	"Stolen Moments"	Audrey Cooke	Julian Perkins	Judy Flynn guest stars	17 September 1996
McCann and Slater arrest a woman for petty theft, and she claims to have killed a cyclist while driving two years before.
111	"A Good Night Out"	Tom Cotter	Richard Stoneman	Hour-long episode; A/Sgt June Ackland becomes full-time Sgt; Martin Glyn Murray and Oliver Smith guest star	18 September 1996
The relief organise a pub-and-curry night to celebrate Acting Sgt Ackland's success in the sergeant's exam, but McCann is not so eager to join in the celebrations.
112	"Chatterbox"	Ian White	Simon Moss	Adrian Bower and Desmond Askew guest star	19 September 1996
Quinnan and a teenage burglary suspect are trapped in a broken lift in a housing estate.
113	"Too Close For Comfort"	Robin Sheppard	Maxwell Young	Steve John Shepherd and Lorraine Ashbourne guest star	20 September 1996
Page and Daly take opposing views in a case of alleged rape involving two cousins.
114	"Blame"	Chris Lovett	Gwyneth Hughes	Gerry Cowper guest stars	24 September 1996
Garfield and Datta deal with a family that is torn apart when the mother commits suicide by overdose of sleeping tablets.
115	"Once a Thief"	Robert Del Maestro	Tony Mulholland	—	26 September 1996
Beech gets a result when a barrister on his blacklist is robbed.
116	"Party Animals"	Moira Armstrong	Katharine Way	Jake Wood guest stars	27 September 1996
Quinnan and Datta are called to a stag party where the strippergram accuses the guests of trying to gang-rape her.
117	"Natural Causes"	Morag Fullarton	Simon Tyrrell	Colin Buchanan and Mary Healey guest star	1 October 1996
Slater and Ackland try to establish whether a pensioner who died on confronting a thief was murdered or died of natural causes.
118	"Known To Someone"	Derek Lister	Joanne Maguire	JoAnne Good, Luisa Bradshaw-White and Gerry Cowper guest star	3 October 1996
Daly and Croft obtain information from a conflicted young man who suspects his brother of a series of violent attacks on women.
119	"Champing at the Bit"	Diana Patrick	Robert Jones	Hermione Gulliford guest stars	4 October 1996
Jarvis and McCann attend the scene of an accident involving a woman driving a horsebox, who tests positive in a breath test. Deakin is after a violent attacker.
120	"Taking Out the Rubbish"	Ken Horn	A. Valentine	Joel Beckett guest stars	8 October 1996
Carver and Greig investigate a burglary but the residents on the estate are too scared to give evidence. Monroe determines to clear out all the known troublemakers.
121	"Presumed Innocent"	Harry Bradbeer	Elizabeth-Anne Wheal	Michael McKell and Roger Blake guest star	10 October 1996
Cryer and Keane uncover the murky past of a teenage girl who has been killed in a road accident.
122	"Change of Heart"	Gill Wilkinson	Graham Mitchell	—	11 October 1996
Meadows and Rawton try to persuade the girlfriend of a rape suspect to help in his arrest.
123	"Hedging Your Bets"	Roger Gartland	Candy Denman	Peter Jeffrey, Hilary Mason and Barbara Young guest star	15 October 1996
Tensions arise between Deakin and Beech after a bookie is robbed. Note: this episode provided a significant development in the character of Don Beech: while his gambling debts had previously been hinted at, this episode ends with Beech failing to convince Deakin that Ben Hedge's threats to expose Beech was simply a front on the former's part.
124	"Out of the Past"	Robin Sheppard	Tony Lindsay	Sam Callis guest stars	17 October 1996
Meadows has to decide where his loyalties lie when an old friend is accused of murder.
125	"Road to Recovery"	Jo Shoop	Len Collin	Eddie Marsden guest stars	18 October 1996
Hollis is concerned about a patient who has recently been discharged from psychiatric care, and clashes with social services.
126	"Three Fools"	Moira Armstrong	Mark Illis	Johanna Hargreaves guest stars	22 October 1996
Greig and Skase investigate when three small-time villains are beaten up over their involvement in a counterfeit money-laundering operation.
127	"Track Marks"	Harry Bradbeer	James Stevenson	—	24 October 1996
Carver disapproves of Boulton's ruthless handling of an informant.
128	"In for the Kill"	Derek Lister	Tom Needham	—	25 October 1996
Meadows and Croft interview a young waiter accused of trying to kill his boss.
129	"Remote Control"	Steve Shill	Julian Spilsbury	—	29 October 1996
Daly and Lines investigate a series of muggings at knifepoint.
130	"Telling Tales"	Jo Shoop	Renny Krupinski	Derek Newark Kate Williams and Malcolm Tierney guest star	31 October 1996
Quinnan tries to persuade an assault victim to testify against her former boyfriend. Boulton and Skase are led on a wild goose chase.
131	"Old Codgers"	Martin Hutchings	Chris Ould	Freddie Jones and Patrick Godfrey guest star	1 November 1996
Quinnan and Greig reluctantly agree to follow up on information received from a former Sun Hill sergeant who claims to know the whereabouts of the man who murdered a girl during World War II.
132	"Trap"	Christopher Hodson	Michael Jenner	—	5 November 1996
Slater gets into trouble after following up on a tip-off about a till snatch.
133	"All in the Mind"	Diana Patrick	Edwin Pearce	Cathy Shipton guest stars	7 November 1996
Monroe and Ackland suspect that a series of apparently unrelated incidents across Sun Hill may be linked to the release of a psychiatric patient trying to find her children.
134	"Trust Me"	Roger Gartland	Isabelle Grey	Paul Greenwood and Catherine Cusack guest star	8 November 1996
Carver and Rawton follow up an irregularity on an insurance claim submitted by a decorator and uncover a double life.
135	"Nice Boy"	Brian Parker	Scott Cherry	Nadim Sawalha guest stars	12 November 1996
Croft and Boulton disagree on how to question a teenager who might be able to lead them to a violent gang.
136	"A Woman's Place"	James Hawes	Simon Moss	—	14 November 1996
Ackland introduces single-manning at Sun Hill, causing problems for Brownlow.
137	"Finishing School"	Michael Cocker	Barry Simner	—	15 November 1996
Slater and Keane reach the end of their probationary periods and face a final assessment.
138	"Death of a Nobody"	Simon Meyers	Tom Needham	Hour-long episode; Peter Guinness and Philip McGough guest star	19 November 1996
Meadows and Deakin investigate the murder of a taxi driver. The action bears the hallmarks of a gangland execution, but why would anyone want to kill a complete nobody?
139	"Up the Wall"	Steve Shill	Lyndon Mallett	—	21 November 1996
Hollis learns an important lesson in community policing when some friendly advice that he gives a resident on noise pollution backfires.
140	"Boiling Point"	Christopher Hodson	Neil Clarke	Kenneth Colley guest stars	22 November 1996
Loxton is investigated by the Complaints Investigation Bureau over an accusation that he assaulted a suspected burglar, although he claims to have been acting in self-defence.
141	"Mirror Image"	John Bruce	Katharine Way	—	26 November 1996
Boulton arrests a woman for drug dealing, but Rawton suspects that she may be a victim of mistaken identity.
142	"Public Relations"	Brian Parker	Philip Kingston	—	28 November 1996
Skase and Hollis demonstrate two differing approaches to police work when a young journalist writing about policing spends a day at Sun Hill.
143	"Lock 'Em In"	Roger Gartland	Sebastian Secker Walker	Jeremy Bulloch guest stars	29 November 1996
Cryer and Page assist the distraught wife of a prisoner who reports her son missing and who fears that her husband is out to get her.
144	"Opportunity Costs"	Martin Hutchings	Edward Canford-Dumas	—	3 December 1996
Brownlow orders Meadows and Conway to review their budgets, but Meadows decides to investigate the unsolved murder of a prostitute instead.
145	"Paying For It"	Jane Prowse	Mark Holloway	—	5 December 1996
Beech and Rawton investigate the apparent assault of a father by his son and uncover a family secret.
146	"Many Happy Returns"	Adrian J. Fearnley	Andrew Rattenbury	Paul Jerricho guest stars	6 December 1996
Boulton and Skase take part in a joint exercise with Customs and Excise to crack a fencing operation. Meadows is concerned that Sun Hill might end up footing the bill but not getting a result.
147	"Black Money"	Roger Gartland	Terry Hodgkinson	Dominic Guard and Danny Webb guest star	10 December 1996
Croft and Rawton investigate some shady Romanian businessmen and a suitcase full of black paper.
148	"Scorned"	Morag Fullarton	Tracey Black	Brian Protheroe, Jane Slavin and Geraldine Fitzgerald guest star	12 December 1996
Croft and Rawton investigate a dentist accused of indecent assault by one of his patients.
149	"Stolen Kisses"	Michael Cocker	Manjit Singh	Samantha Seager and Jo Martin guest star	13 December 1996
Monroe, Datta and Loxton talk down a nursery cleaner when she holds a 3-year-old girl hostage, then investigate the woman's claims she is the girl's biological mother.
150	"Jumping to Conclusions"	Harry Bradbeer	Philip Kingston	—	17 December 1996
Carver's patience is tested by a compulsive liar. Ackland and Quinnan search for a girl allegedly abducted by a religious cult.
151	"Toe the Line"	James Hawes	Stephen Plaice	Michael Attwell, Michelle Gomez, Joe Absolom and David Schofield guest star	19 December 1996
Monroe and Conway uncover a bogus wheel-clamping operation.
152	"A Gun to the Head"	Chris Lovett	Maxwell Young	John Fraser and Rob Edwards guest star	20 December 1996
Beech and Daly are put in an impossible situation when a judge decides to reveal the name of their informant.
153	"Merrily on High"	Michael Cocker	Robert Jones	New opening sequence introduced; Danny Dyer and Frank Mills guest star	24 December 1996
It is almost Christmas, and Assistant Commissioner Hicks has declared Sun Hill Police Station an alcohol-free zone – terrible news for Brownlow and Conway who had hoped to enjoy a "liquid lunch" when taking him to a posh French restaurant. Stamp and Slater arrest an elderly man after a road rage incident, but manage to reunite him with his estranged family.
154	"Hers"	Michael Cocker	Mark Holloway	Tamzin Outhwaite guest stars	26 December 1996
Stamp and Page look into the theft of a hearse containing the coffin of a thief who died in a traffic accident.
155	"Hat Trick"	John Bruce	Stephen Greenhorn	Eric Mason guest stars	27 December 1996
Boulton and Skase investigate a car-ramming incident involving a member of a local pub team.
156	"The Right Thing"	Nigel Douglas	Tony Mulholland	First appearance of PC Jamila Blake; Paul Bettany and Ken Bones guest star	31 December 1996
New WPC Jamila Blake joins Sun Hill after three years away from the job. She pairs with Stamp, and they find an overdosed boy during a foot pursuit, and Cryer takes an interest when he discovers the victim is on the same basketball team as a former Sun Hill officer's son.
