= The Needs of the Many =

"The needs of the many outweigh the needs of the few" is a quotation from Star Trek II: The Wrath of Khan.

It may also refer to

- "The Needs of the Many" (Heroes Reborn (miniseries))
- "The Needs of the Many" (The Bill)
