= June Page =

British actress

June Page is a British actress, best known for her role as Sally in three episodes of the 1970s television drama Survivors.

Her other TV credits include: Doctor Who, Brideshead Revisited, Casualty, The Bill and Bad Girls.
