= Alan Westaway =

British actor (born 1969)

Alan Westaway (born 17 February 1969) is a British actor and screenwriter, best known for playing Nick Slater in The Bill from 1995 to 1997.

== Career ==
Westaway also appeared in two episodes of series 4 of Two Pints of Lager and a Packet of Crisps playing Phillip and also EastEnders in 2004. He transitioned into screenwriting for British television, writing Stan Lee's Lucky Man and the second series of Sky's medical thriller Temple.
