= David Quilter =

English actor

- Born: 11 June 1942 (age 83); Northwood, London, England
- Occupation: Actor
- Family: Lawrence Beesley (grandfather)

David Quilter (born 11 June 1942) is an English actor who has made numerous appearances in British television plays and series since the mid-1960s.

== Early life and family ==
He was born in Northwood, London, and attended Bryanston School, Dorset. "My first inkling that it was possible to be a professional actor was when a boy at school got a scholarship to RADA," remembered Quilter. "I never did any acting at school, which I slightly regret, but seeing him actually go off and train to be an actor, it made me realise that it was what I wanted to do."

Quilter trained at Webber Douglas Academy of Dramatic Art in South Kensington and then joined weekly rep at Chesterfield in 1963. "We did seven plays in eight weeks," he recalled. "I then joined the RSC in 1964 to play very small parts in the complete history cycle."

Quilter's grandfather, Lawrence Beesley, was a survivor of the sinking of RMS Titanic and wrote an account of his experience called The Loss of the SS Titanic. Quilter made three 15-minute films based on Beesley's story, and in 2012 gave a reading of Beesley's account at the Aldeburgh Lighthouse Station for the 100th anniversary of the sinking.

== Career ==
His television appearances include Softly, Softly (1967), Some Mothers Do 'Ave 'Em (1973), Get Some In! (1975–78), The Bill (1990–97), Grange Hill (2000) as Mr Arnold, Silent Witness (2001–03) and Doctor Who (2008). He also appeared in the film The Battle of Britain (1969) as a pilot, All Creatures Great and Small (1988), Goldeneye (1989), Charles and Diana: Unhappily Ever After (1992) as the Duke of Edinburgh, and Jinnah (1998).
