= Eric Mason =

British actor (c.1933–2010)

- Born: c. 1933
- Died: 7 June 2010 (aged 76–77); Sussex, England
- Occupation: Actor

Eric Mason (c. 1933 – 7 June 2010) was a British actor. Originally a stevedore working at Surrey Docks, he sustained a back injury in a road accident and ended up taking an acting career. He made his theatrical debut in 1963, aged 30, in Gentle Jack by Robert Bolt, starring Dame Edith Evans.

His television credits include: Z-Cars, Dixon of Dock Green, Doctor Who, Jack the Ripper, Bergerac, Fox, Sea of Souls, Auf Wiedersehen, Pet, King and Castle (pilot),Minder in episode "Come in T-64, Your Time Is Ticking Away" and The Bill.

He had a notable role in Hot Fuzz (2007). He played the husband of Billie Whitelaw's character and was involved in the film's climax, where he fought Simon Pegg. He also played the masked executioner in the 1966 film A Man for All Seasons.

== Filmography ==
Year	Title	Role	Notes
1943	They Met in the Dark	Benson, Illusionist	
1947	Dual Alibi		
1964	Rattle of a Simple Man	Strip Club Doorman	Uncredited
1966	Fahrenheit 451	Male Nurse	Uncredited
1966	A Man for All Seasons	Executioner	
1968	The Limbo Line	Castle	
1971	The Blood on Satan's Claw	Villager	Uncredited
1971	Villain	Landlord	Uncredited
1973	The Mackintosh Man	Postman	
1973	Yellow Dog	Stallkeeper	
1974	Juggernaut	2nd Detective	
1974	Black Starlet	Brisco	
1975	The Hanged Man	Kenny Simpson (ep2)	
1976	The Likely Lads	Truck Driver	
1978	Law And Order	D.S. Ted Collision (ep3)	
1979	North Sea Hijack	Stallemo	
1979	Dirty Money	Fernand	
1981	Jake's End (BBC2 Playhouse)	Dumpy	
1985	Out of the Darkness	Mr. Barrow	
1986	Foreign Body	Lodging house man #2	
1988	Jack the Ripper	Publican	
1996	Strange but True?	fisherman se3ep2	
1996	Tiré à part	Gardien cimetiere	
2000	Shiner	Uncle Terry	
2004	The Calcium Kid	Greengrocer	
2007	Hot Fuzz	Bernard Cooper	Final film role
