= Nick Crittenden (writer) =

British writer and researcher

Nick Crittenden is a British writer and researcher who has worked in UK television drama for the BBC and ITV. He was awarded a Fellowship in Creative and Performing Arts by the UK's Arts and Humanities Research Council (AHRC) for research into feature film development. He was made a Fellow of the Royal Society of Arts (FRSA) for making a "prominent contribution to positive social change". He studied creative and critical writing at the University of East Anglia.
