= Annie Hulley =

English television and stage actress and voice over artist

- Born: Anne Hulley; Wakefield, West Riding of Yorkshire, England, UK
- Occupations: Actress and voice over artist
- Years active: 1974–present
- Spouse: Chris Clough
- Children: 2

Annie Hulley Born in Wakefield, West Riding of Yorkshire) is an English television and stage actress and voice over artist. She was the narrator of The Yorkshire Auction House from 2020 to 2025. Annie featured in Mr Bates vs The Post Office. She has appeared in the British soap-operas Emmerdale as Karen Moore and Coronation Street. Hulley wrote the play Dog Days as she was 'frustrated at the lack of roles for mature actresses'

She trained at Bristol Old Vic Theatre School.

== Television appearances ==
2025	The Hairdresser Mysteries	Brenda	The Gym
2024	Mr Bates vs The Post Office	Reverend Jane	
2021	Dhillons Jackpot	Self	
2020	Lucky Man	Diane	
2019	Dark Heart	Judge	
2019	Born and Bred	Betty	
2018	People Just Do Nothing	Jenny	Chiswick House
2017	Vera	Diane Weaver	Episode: "Dark Angel"
2011	Sirens	Stella Woodvine	
2008	Skins	Chris Miles' Mother	
2007	Yorkshire Ripper: Mind of a Killer (documentary)	Narrator	
2002	Tipping the Velvet	Mrs. Astley	
1999–2000	Coronation Street	Gwen Davies/Loveday	
1994–1995	September Song	Myra	
1992	Between The Lines	Carol Salter	
1991	Sleepers	Sandra Robinson	
1988	Doctor Who: The Happiness Patrol	Voice of newscaster	
1988	The Return of the Antelope	Brelca	
1986	Emmerdale	Karen Moore	
1982	Teach Yourself Gibberish	Various	
1980	Sounding Brass	Janet Bennett	
1980	We, the Accused	Sarah	
2021–	The Yorkshire Auction House	Narrator	20 episodes
