= Álvaro López (musician, born 1979) =

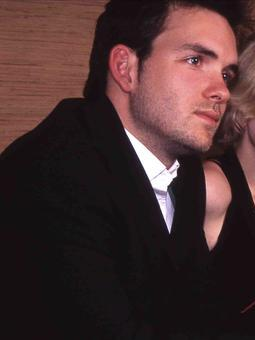
- López in 2005

Background information
- Born: 28 September 1979 (age 46)
- Origin: Madrid, Spain
- Genres: Trip hop, electronica, acid jazz
- Occupation: Drummer
- Instruments: Drums, programming
- Website: www.secondperson.net

Álvaro López (born 1979) is a drummer and producer. His most well-known project to date has been as drummer/programmer with the English trip hop band Second Person, working on their 2004 debut release Chromatography and the following two albums The Elements and Come to Dust with band-mates Julia Johnson and Mark Maclaine.

The Madrid-born drummer/songwriter is also known for his work with The Feeling in their early days has produced and played on various electro tracks with a number of Spanish DJs including Karim Haas and Cristian Varela.

== History ==
Starting in the school choir at the age of 6, he moved on to study classical guitar and percussion. After moving to London and four years studying Music Performance and Technology he travelled to Cuba in Summer of 2003 to study Afro-Cuban Rhythm. Once there, he studied under Betun (Luis Valiente Marin) the well known and hugely respected percussionist for Cachao López (Buena Vista Social Club).

López has played in a number of bands with a wide range of styles including funk, rock, blues, jazz, Latin and hip hop. He joined Second Person in mid-2004.

== Trivia ==
- His Jazz credits include playing with Wynton Marsalis' band the Lincoln Center Jazz Orchestra at The Barbican.
- He can be seen throughout London playing at various shows and jam sessions most nights of the week.

== Credits/Releases ==
- Come to Dust - Second Person: drummer/programmer (in production: Album)
- The Elements - Second Person : drummer/programmer (2007: Album)
- Live at the Bedford - Second Person : drummer (2006: DVD)
- Sol Chango - Sol Chango Trio: drummer/co-producer (2006: Album)
- Chromatography - Second Person : drummer/programmer (2004: Album)
