= Live at the Bedford =

Live At The Bedford

Live album by Second Person
- Released: 18 December 2005
- Recorded: 2005 (Live at The Bedford, London)
- Genre: Post Trip-Hop
- Length: ~56:00 (33:00 Live + 23:00 Extras)
- Label: Independent
- Producer: Mark Maclaine (The Silence)

Live at the Bedford is a 2005 live DVD album by British Post Trip Hop band Second Person.

This is the band's first live DVD and contains songs from their debut album Chromatography. The performance was filmed at The Bedford, Balham London on 23 May 2005 but due to recording and writing commitments, it took nearly a year and a half for the DVD to be finished. Band members Julia Johnson, Mark Maclaine and Álvaro López play alongside guest musicians: DJ Shylock (turntables) and Mike Ausden (guitar/trumpet) and the live performance was directed by Susan Luciani (also Director of Dolls for which the band provided music). The DVD was edited by Pierangelo Pirak and Ben King, produced by Mark Maclaine (aka The Silence) and mixed by him and Ben Jones at The Silence Corporation studios, London.

== Track listing ==
1. "Demons Die" – 3:30
2. "I Spy" – 4:12
3. "Too Cold To Snow" – 4:42
4. "Wreckage" – 3:16
5. "No Window" – 4:21
6. "Divine" – 4:09
7. "Senseless Sentences" – 4:20
8. "Demons In The Scenery" – 3:48

Bonus Tracks:

1. "Grace" – 5:02
2. "That's What I've Been Told" – 4:09 (video taken from "Snows in the House 2")
