= The Bill series 6 =

The Bill
- Series 6
- Series 6 Australian DVD cover
- No. of episodes: 104

Release
- Original network: ITV
- Original release: 2 January – 27 December 1990

Series chronology
- ← Previous; Series 5 Next → Series 7

The sixth series of The Bill, a British television drama, consists of 104 episodes, broadcast between 2 January and 27 December 1990.

== Storylines ==
Series 6 marked a significant period of change on the series, the most notable being the move to its third and ultimately final set at Merton, accounting for the move with a station fire plot, the first of three on the series. PC Ken Melvin was killed as a result of a car bomb as one of several high profile exits, with original characters PC Taffy Edwards and Sergeant Tom Penny departing after six years: Penny’s exit came as part of a plot that was split into two, giving evidence in the case of rival station Barton Street custody sergeant assaulting a prisoner, the same station’s officers later arresting Penny for drink driving to end his career prematurely. Other multi part plots, rarely seen on the series prior to this year, saw the hunt for a child serial killer as well as an affair between pilot star WPC June Ackland and the show’s first DCI Gordon Wray.

== DVD releases ==
The series was first released on DVD as part of the Collection 5 and Collection 6 DVD boxsets in Australia, made available on 9 April – 8 October 2008, respectively. The series was later reissued as two-half series boxsets in Australia, released on 7 March 2012. The above artwork is taken from the most recent Australian release. It features images of DC Tosh Lines and DI Frank Burnside. The original Collection boxsets contained sole images of PC Reg Hollis and DS Ted Roach.

In the UK, the first nine episodes were released on DVD under the title Volume 7, on 2 September 2013.

== Podcast ==
A number of audio commentaries for Series 6 episodes have been recorded with cast and crew, including stars Larry Dann (Sgt Alec Peters), Chris Humphreys (PC Richard Turnham), Jon Iles (DC Mike Dashwood) and Lynne Miller (WPC Cathy Marshall), writers Russell Lewis, Garry Lyons and J.C. Wilsher, camera operator Alison Chapman and producer Tony Virgo.

== Cast changes ==
=== Arrivals ===
- Insp Andrew Monroe (Episode 4–)
- DCI Gordon Wray (Episode 33–)
- PC Barry Stringer (Episode 41–)
- PC Steve Loxton (Episode 47–)
- PC Ron Smollett (Episode 50–)
- DAC Trevor Hicks (Episode 78–)
- WPC Delia French (Episode 79–)
- Sgt Joseph Corrie (Episode 100–)
- DCI Kim Reid (Episode 102–)
- Sgt John Maitland (Episode 103–)

=== Departures ===
- PC Timothy Able – Unexplained
- PC Francis "Taffy" Edwards – Transferred to a Welsh police force
- Insp Christine Frazer – Took a leave of absence to write a thesis on women in the police
- PC Ken Melvin – Killed in a car bomb attack
- Sgt Tom Penny – Resigned after being arrested for drink driving
- PC Richard Turnham – Transferred to MS11
- DCI Gordon Wray – Transferred after having an affair with WPC June Ackland

== Episodes ==
No. overall	No. in series	Title	Directed by	Written by	Episode notes	Original release date
188	1	"By The Skin of Our Teeth"	Bren Simson	Arthur McKenzie	Nigel Le Vaillant and Robert Perkins guest star	2 January 1990
Able has a nightmarish day. A dispute over tomatoes lands him with a complaint; a man he lets go after being thrown out of a pub destroys his girlfriends house and Tim has to talk him into giving up a knife; Peters chastises him for being too keen; a drunk he brings in has actually been the victim of a robbery; and Brownlow wants a 1-to-1 chat in his office! Notes: Robert Perkins would join the cast as Sgt Ray Steele in 1993.
189	2	"Officers and Gentlemen"	Diana Patrick	Steve Trafford	Laurence Harrington guest stars	4 January 1990
Carver comes under fire from Conway as a suspect arrested by Turnham confesses to a robbery that a man is already serving time for. Brownlow and Conway disagree with the station's female officers on policy to be used when attending incidents at public houses.
190	3	"Carry Your Bags Sir"	Simon Jones	John Milne	Phil Nice and Brigitte Kahn guest star	9 January 1990
Burnside and Cryer escort a German police officer around to hunt stolen car parts, while Ackland and Hollis try to help the repeated victim of burglary.
191	4	"I Thought You'd Gone"	Nick Laughland	J. C. Wilsher	First appearance of Insp Andrew Monroe, final appearances of PC Francis "Taffy" Edwards and Insp Christine Frazer	11 January 1990
Frazer and Edwards prepare to leave Sun Hill.
192	5	"C.A.D."	Chris Hodson	J.C. Wilsher	Geraldine Fitzgerald, Stephen Finlay guest star	16 January 1990
Martella disappears while hunting robbery suspects, causing a headache for Peters, who has come in to cover CAD on his day off. Hollis organises a blood bank for Conway. In 2020, writer J.C. Wilsher recorded an audio commentary for this episode.
193	6	"A Day Lost"	Phillip Casson	Les Pollard	—	18 January 1990
The disappearance of a young boy unnerves the relief following reports of a man repeatedly loitering near a school.
194	7	"A Clean Division"	Derek Lister	Julian Jones	David Lonsdale and Andrew Powell guest star	23 January 1990
Carver is arrested after failing a breath test by an overzealous PC from Stafford Row – where the top brass are having a meeting.
195	8	"Roger And Out"	David Giles	John Kershaw	—	25 January 1990
Penny causes a divide in both management and the relief by deciding to report Lines for taking in an unauthorised lodger.
196	9	"Addresses"	Chris Lovett	Peter J. Hammond	Victor Maddern guest stars	30 January 1990
Martella and Cryer are given the runaround on a night patrol.
197	10	"Michael Runs The Family Now"	John Michael Phillips	Kieran Prendiville	Roy Holder and Robert Aldous guest star	1 February 1990
Burnside investigates a robbery at a shop owned by the son of a notorious late villain.
198	11	"Against The Odds"	Keith Washington	Arthur McKenzie	Terry Downes and Harry Fielder guest star	6 February 1990
Greig is named Acting DI with Burnside off sick and clashes with Dashwood over a tip-off from a snout. In 2019, actor Jon Iles and camera operator Alison Chapman recorded an audio commentary for this episode.
199	12	"Bloodsucker"	Chris Hodson	Steve Trafford	—	8 February 1990
A domestic leads to a scam involving a loan shark stealing child benefit books as payment. Quinnan's enterprising calculator sales cause havoc with the Sun Hill crime figures.
200	13	"Workers in Uniform"	Colm Villa	J.C. Wilsher	—	13 February 1990
Hollis urges Brownlow to give the relief a fair deal on an enforced working day at short notice.
201	14	"Something To Hide"	John Michael Phillips	Tom Needham	—	15 February 1990
Turnham and Datta are called to a break-in, with no signs of forced entry.
202	15	"The Old Men's Run"	David Hayman	John Milne	—	20 February 1990
Cryer struggles to keep his cool as he works with an ankle injury. Marshall works as acting sergeant in the absence of a sick Penny.
203	16	"Legacies"	Chris Hodson	Peter Gibbs	Wendy van der Plank and Symond Lawes guest star	22 February 1990
Burnside links a series of burglaries to a law firm where one of the partners is a constant thorn in his side. The opportunity arises to sort out the station's clear-up rates.
204	17	"Yesterday, Today, Tomorrow"	Colm Villa	Geoff McQueen	Louise Lombard, Harry Landis and Jon Finch guest star	27 February 1990
Brownlow is shocked to discover that a girl arrested for drug dealing is the daughter of one of his old friends. Viv goes undercover at a factory where coats are going missing.
205	18	"Something Special"	David Giles	Guy Meredith	Final appearance of PC Timothy Able; Lorraine Ashbourne and Davyd Harries guest star	1 March 1990
A detective superintendent from Northern Ireland asks Burnside to recommend an officer for an undercover operation that is due to last six months.
206	19	"Enemies"	Alan Wareing	Philip Martin	Badi Uzzaman guest stars	6 March 1990
An arrogant community liaison officer angers the Sun Hill team by demanding justifications for their arrests of Asians.
207	20	"Safe Place"	Tom Cotter	Peter J. Hammond	Frank Jarvis guest stars	8 March 1990
Martella goes undercover at a psychiatric hospital to gain info on a patient implicated in a bank robbery.
208	21	"Burnside Knew My Father"	Tom Cotter	Lennie James	Rudolph Walker and David Gooderson guest star	13 March 1990
Burnside discovers that an old friend is planning to help his terminally ill wife commit suicide.
209	22	"Watching"	Chris Lovett	Peter Gibbs	Norman Rossington guest stars	15 March 1990
Garfield and Quinnan investigate when two schools are robbed.
210	23	"University Challenge"	Derek Lister	Simon Moss	George Irving and Mary Maude guest star	20 March 1990
Burnside determines to hunt down a supposedly reformed armed robber who he believes assaulted him as he tried to arrest him.
211	24	"Growing Pains"	Phillip Casson	Barry Appleton	—	22 March 1990
Carver is pushed down a flight of stairs during an operation, adding an extra zeal for the team to find the suspects. Garfield's snout leads him to a man with a gun, but the interview doesn't go to plan.
212	25	"One of the Boys"	Alan Wareing	Jonathan Rich	WPC Viv Martella is promoted to WDC; Andy Serkis guest stars	27 March 1990
Martella joins CID but struggles to bring in a prostitute for Lines to confirm an alibi.
213	26	"Beggars and Choosers"	Bob Hird	Steve Trafford	Wally K. Daly and Bryan Coleman guest star	29 March 1990
Sun Hill's uniform ranks struggle to cope as Barton Street officers move homeless people onto their patch.
214	27	"Citadel"	Bob Hird	J.C. Wilsher	Roger Brierley, Christopher Godwin, Jon Glover and Michael Bilton guest star	3 April 1990
Brownlow learns the yard are planning to expand Sun Hill. Turnham's colleagues are interviewed about him as he seeks a move to Special Branch. In 2020, actor Chris Humphreys and writer J.C. Whilsher recorded an audio commentary for this episode.
215	28	"Blue Eyed Boy"	Nick Laughland	Julian Jones	David Hayman and Kika Mirylees guest star	5 April 1990
Melvin has a disastrous day when he forgets he has to attend to court, putting him at odds with Burnside, and he is then mistaken for a burglar after losing his warrant card.
216	29	"Full House"	Julian Aymes	Arthur McKenzie	Final appearance of PC Richard Turnham	10 April 1990
Renovations begin at Sun Hill amidst the hunt for a man who has sexually assaulted a child, while Monroe hauls Quinnan over the coals regarding his lack of action.
217	30	"Big Fish, Little Fish"	Nick Laughland	Patrick Harkins	Oliver Smith guest stars	12 April 1990
Burnside is tasked with a highly sensitive operation to arrest a former police officer running a theft racket.
218	31	"Information Received"	Michael Simpson	Kevin Clarke	Dean Harris, Ann Mitchell and Paul O'Grady guest star	17 April 1990
Roach tries to prove a case against racketeer Mickey Owen, and with a Flying Squad DI applying pressure, he reluctantly has to re-recruit ex-informant Roxanne.
219	32	"Close Co-Operation"	Michael Simpson	Garry Lyons	Patrick Cremin and Philip Whitchurch guest star	19 April 1990
Sun Hill continue to process their prisoners at Barton Street, but the assault of one of them by a Barton Street officer causes friction. Notes: Philip Whitchurch would join the cast as Ch Insp Philip Cato in 1993. In 2020, writer Garry Lyons and actor Larry Dann recorded an audio commentary for this episode.
220	33	"Middleman"	Michael Simpson	J.C. Wilsher	First appearance of DCI Gordon Wray	24 April 1990
Greig, Carver and Lines recruit a burglary suspect as a snout to crack down a drugs manufacturer, with the assistance of Drugs Squad DI Gordon Wray.
221	34	"Corkscrew"	Michael Simpson	J.C. Wilsher	Matthew Scurfield and Pete Lee-Wilson guest star	26 April 1990
Burnside and Wray's clashing threatens to jeopardise their bid to recover the disastrous Operation Middleman.
222	35	"Obsessions"	Julian Aymes	Peter Gibbs	Clare Clifford and Nicholas Gecks guest star	1 May 1990
Martella and Burnside deal with a lawyer who claims an obsessive stalker has threatened to kill his wife.
223	36	"Small Hours"	Mike Vardy	Kevin Clarke	David Neilson guest stars	3 May 1990
Datta and Quinnan investigate an accusation of harassment.
224	37	"Victims"	Derek Lister	Jonathan Rich	John Cater guest stars	8 May 1990
Lines and Ackland deal with an assault on a primary school teacher.
225	38	"Somebody's Husband"	Derek Lister	Jonathan Rich	John Cater guest stars	10 May 1990
Ackland puts herself in danger when she suspects a man of being the knife attacker.
226	39	"Canley Fields"	Mike Vardy	Christopher Russell	Gary Webster guest stars	15 May 1990
The kidnapping of a child is suspected to be a hoax by Roach. But just as he and Munroe convince Conway to call off the search, a boy is reported missing.
227	40	"The Night Watch"	Graham Theakston	J.C. Wilsher	Emma Chambers and Mark Addy guest star	17 May 1990
Roach and Martella investigate a rape. Garfield and Young are called to a noise complaint at a squat.
228	41	"Trojan Horse"	Graham Theakston	Pat Dunlop	Final appearance of PC Ken Melvin	22 May 1990
What starts as a routine arrest for joyriding leads to disaster and tragedy for Sun Hill. In 2019, producer Tony Virgo recorded an audio commentary for this episode.
229	42	"Rites"	Derek Lister	Jonathan Rich	First appearance of PC Barry Stringer; guest appearances of Francis 'Taffy' Edwards and Tony 'Yorkie' Smith; Kika Mirylees guest stars	24 May 1990
The Sun Hill relief mourn the loss of one of their own colleagues, Ken Melvin, and, as he is laid to rest, some old faces make a reappearance.
230	43	"Answers"	Chris Hodson	Peter J. Hammond	Anthony May guest stars	29 May 1990
Dashwood and Lines re-question a man about a previous case.
231	44	"A Fresh Start"	Derek Lister	Christopher Russell	guest star.	31 May 1990
The newly refurbished station opens for business, while Roach and Lines investigate when a girl's body is found wrapped in a bag. Guest cast: Tony Caunter, Mmoloki Chrystie, Desmond Cullum-Jones, Simon Rouse and Paul Antony-Barber; Notes: Simon Rouse (as the newly-demoted Detective Chief Inspector Jack Meadows) would join the cast in 1992.
232	45	"A Case To Answer"	Stuart Burge	J.C. Wilsher	Emma Chambers, Mark Addy and Cyril Nri guest star	5 June 1990
Martella assists a lady in court on rape charges while Wray decides things need to be changed in CID.
233	46	"Line Up"	Stuart Burge	Elizabeth Anne-Wheal	—	7 June 1990
Stamp arrests a man without making a positive ID and Martella is desperate to get him charged.
234	47	"Police Powers"	Gordon Flemyng	Julian Jones	First appearance of PC Steve Loxton; Ian Reddington guest stars	12 June 1990
Monroe and Cryer investigate an assault on a footballer, while Stamp and new recruit Steve Loxton deal with the crowds.
235	48	"Action Book"	Graham Theakston	Christopher Russell	Michael Garner and Simon Rouse guest star. DSU Jack Meadows appears briefly.	14 June 1990
The Sun Hill team hunt a paedophile roaming the streets of Sun Hill before they can strike again.
236	49	"Tactics"	Graham Theakston	Arthur McKenzie	Ben Onwukwe and Desmond McNamara guest star	19 June 1990
A Sheffield CID team arrives, and they must work with Sun Hill in a bid to bring down five villains.
237	50	"Scores"	Gordon Flemyng	Peter J. Hammond	First appearance of PC Ron Smollett	21 June 1990
Burnside tasks Roach and Lines with observing an old adversary, Ralph Trafford, when he discovers that he has returned to Sun Hill.
238	51	"Witch Hunt"	Derek Lister	Christopher Russell	Ron Cook guest stars	26 June 1990
Wray and Lines re-question a man over the murder of two school children, but are disappointed when the man's alibi checks out.
239	52	"Close To Home"	Nick Laughland	Christopher Russell	Doña Croll guest stars	28 June 1990
Ackland and Cryer investigate an accusation of child abuse.
240	53	"Breaking Point"	Peter Barber-Fleming	Les Pollard	—	3 July 1990
Burnside tries to get a confession from an experienced old thief who has been identified by his fingerprints.
241	54	"Jumping The Gun"	Peter Barber-Fleming	David Hoskins	—	5 July 1990
Burnside is prepared to take risks to nail the villain responsible when a child is held hostage.
242	55	"What Kind of Man"	Chris Lovett	Christopher Russell	Jim McManus guest stars	10 July 1990
When Quinnan investigates a minor robbery at a school, he spots something that leads to a breakthrough in the Canley Fields murder investigations.
243	56	"Beat Crime"	Nick Laughland	J.C. Wilsher	John Alford and Lyndam Gregory guest star	12 July 1990
Wray urges CID to work more closely with uniform.
244	57	"Unsocial Hours"	Derek Lister	J.C. Wilsher	Peter Benson guest stars	17 July 1990
Wray's and Ackland's plans for a quiet lunch are doomed by a CID drugs obbo.
245	58	"Interpretations"	Julian Aymes	Jonathan Rich	Shaheen Khan and Jenna Russell guest star	19 July 1990
Roach investigates a series of firebombings in the Asian community.
246	59	"Angles"	Roger Tucker	Arthur McKenzie	—	24 July 1990
Burnside and Monroe feud over policy, overtime and allocation of resources.
247	60	"Watch My Lips"	Julian Aymes	Patrick Harkins	—	26 July 1990
Carver is assaulted by a suspicious man who turns out to be deaf and was only defending himself.
248	61	"Feeling Brave"	Richard Holthouse	John Milne	Colin McCormack and Shirin Taylor guest star	31 July 1990
Carver, Stamp and Quinnan interrupt a Post Office burglary in the Area car.
249	62	"Come Fly With Me"	Michael Kerrigan	Peter Gibbs	Albert Moses, Tariq Yunus and Raymond Llewellyn guest star	2 August 1990
Stamp and Ackland attend a disturbance at a Travel Agency.
250	63	"Attitudes"	Richard Holthouse	Arthur McKenzie	Liz Gebhardt guest stars	7 August 1990
After winning a game of cards, Young is sent all over town by vengeful colleagues.
251	64	"Robbo"	Chris Lovett	Brian Finch	John Bardon guest stars	9 August 1990
A retired officer returning to Sun Hill causes some interference.
252	65	"Ground Rules"	Michael Kerrigan	Geoff McQueen	Andrew McCulloch guest stars	14 August 1990
With an Inspection due, Brownlow and Conway discuss the readiness of the station.
253	66	"Once a Copper"	Frank W Smith	Robin Mukherjee	—	16 August 1990
Burnside visits an ex-copper doing time in an attempt to nail a big time operator.
254	67	"Vendetta"	Graham Theakston	Peter Brooks	Amanda Mealing and Luan Peters guest star	21 August 1990
Burnside has a feud between two crime families to deal with.
255	68	"My Favourite Things"	Roger Tucker	Arthur McKenzie	Sue Woodford guest stars	23 August 1990
Quinnan's ways as a police officer gets him into trouble with an irrational Monroe.
256	69	"Win Some Lose Some"	Jeremy Ancock	Jonathan Rich	Colin Jeavons guest stars	28 August 1990
The threatened closure of a local nightclub pits Burnside against his closest friends and his boss.
257	70	"Up The Steps"	Jeremy Ancock	Carolyn Sally Jones	Dominic Jephcott and Eileen Helsby guest star	30 August 1990
Loxton, Young and Peters attend court to see the sentence of a local gangster.
258	71	"Where There's a Will"	Garth Tucker	Patrick Harkins	Bernard Gallagher guest stars	4 September 1990
Cryer is left something in the will of a late well-known madam.
259	72	"Near The Knuckle"	Nick Hamm	Ayshe Raif	Dorothy Tutin and David Quilter guest star	6 September 1990
Datta investigates when a woman is beaten up by her popular doctor husband.
260	73	"Body Language"	Nick Hamm	Dick Sharples	Ian Redford and Geoffrey Beevers guest star	11 September 1990
Stamp's pursuit of a group of black youths causes racial tension in the borough to increase.
261	74	"When Did You Last See Your Father"	Bob Gabriel	Barry Appleton	Billy Murray, Brian Rawlinson and Gertan Klauber guest star	13 September 1990
After a school bus accident, a child awaiting his mother in the station recognises his father in the composite drawing of a criminal. Dashwood hunts for a wild animal dubbed the 'beast of Sun Hill'. Notes: Billy Murray would join the cast as DS Don Beech in 1995.
262	75	"Eye-Witness"	Graham Theakston	Christopher Penfold	David Harewood guest stars	18 September 1990
Service station video captures the racist murder of a man attacked in his car by a gang of football hooligans. CID are hampered in their attempt to prove who stabbed him.
263	76	"Sufficient Evidence"	Garth Tucker	Rib Davis	Abigail Thaw guest stars	20 September 1990
Quinnan frames a prisoner for drug dealing, a decision that he will later regret.
264	77	"Forget-Me-Not"	Frank W Smith	Russell Lewis	Jack Ellis guest stars	25 September 1990
Marshall's ex-husband arrives at Sun Hill looking for Wray. In 2021, Lynne Miller (WPC Cathy Marshall) and writer Russell Lewis recorded an audio commentary for this episode.
265	78	"Something to Remember"	Laura Sims	Christopher Russell	First appearance of DAC Trevor Hicks; Pippa Hinchley guest stars	27 September 1990
Quinnan receives a commendation for catching a child murderer while Marshall and Stamp deal with one of the victim's parents.
266	79	"Off The Leash"	Chris Hodson	Christopher Russell	First appearance of WPC Delia French; Declan Mulholland guest stars	2 October 1990
Ex Sun Hill typist Delia French is back at the station – in uniform. Her confident attitude shocks Peters but proves useful in assisting CID with a shoplifting gang.
267	80	"Family Ties"	Chris Lovett	Martyn Wade	John Golightly and David Quilter guest star	4 October 1990
Burnside is forced to bring a mentally ill prisoner to Sun Hill.
268	81	"Old Friends"	Michael Kerrigan	Nick Collins	Sydney Livingstone and Marian McLoughlin guest star	9 October 1990
Roach investigates when an ex-police officer's mother is violently assaulted. Quinnan is frustrated when the darker side of the public shows during the rescue of a young girl from a shift.
269	82	"Pride and Prejudice"	Laura Sims	Tim Firth	David Easter guest stars	11 October 1990
Garfield feels Cryer's wrath for his behaviour after finding out a man he has brought in for arson is HIV positive.
270	83	"Housey Housey"	William Brayne	John Chambers	Sian Thomas and Paul Copley guest star	16 October 1990
Conway's relationship with a local MP causes problems at Sun Hill.
271	84	"Connelly's Kids"	Chris Lovett	Michael Cameron	—	18 October 1990
When Greig arrests a man for handling stolen goods, Martella is more interested in the behaviour of his children.
272	85	"One of Those Days"	Nick Laughland	Roger Leach	—	23 October 1990
Ackland and Loxton attend a hit and run. Brownlow examines the treatment of WPCs at Sun Hill.
273	86	"Jack-The-Lad"	Bill Hays	Michael Baker	Linda Marlowe and Jacquetta May guest star	25 October 1990
Datta and Stamp investigate a violent confrontation connected with an extramarital affair. Burnside pursues a criminal that assaulted one of his informants.
274	87	"Blue Murder"	Stuart Urban	Russell Lewis	Bob Mason, Patsy Palmer and Lee MacDonald guest star	30 October 1990
Sgt Cryer shoots an armed robber who is later found to have an unloaded gun.
275	88	"Effective Persuaders"	Nick Laughland	J.C. Wilsher	Ron Donachie and Tony Rohr guest star	1 November 1990
Burnside, Carver, Ackland, Quinnan, Martella and Greig attend a training course, where Carver and Quinnan come to blows.
276	89	"A Sense of Duty"	Bill Hays	Julian Jones	Jeremy Nicholas guest stars	6 November 1990
An off-duty Roach hands a drunken man over to uniform, but confusion arises over exactly who the arresting officer is, rousing the ire of Monroe.
277	90	"Lying in Wait"	William Brayne	Chris Boucher	Simon Rouse	8 November 1990
Stamp is on the scene when a child is thrown into a canal and Garfield makes his first murder suspect arrest.
278	91	"Plato For Policemen"	Chris Hodson	Robin Mukherjee	Kerry Peers, Simon Rouse and Charles Kay guest star	13 November 1990
A builder complains about illegal dumping on his site. Brownlow, Conway, Greig and Meadows attend a training course in policing methods. Notes: Kerry Peers would join the cast as WPC, later WDC, Suzi Croft in 1993.
279	92	"Testimony"	Chris Hodson	Robin Mukherjee	Bruce Alexander, Kerry Peers and Nicola Stapleton guest star	15 November 1990
Roach continues to investigate a burglary that escalated into rape. Notes: Kerry Peers would join the cast as WPC, later WDC, Suzi Croft in 1993.
280	93	"Decisions"	Tom Cotter	Arthur McKenzie	Patricia Hayes and Patricia Brake guest star	20 November 1990
Cryer returns from leave after the fatal shooting. A social worker asks Cryer to assist an elderly lady who has recently been burgled.
281	94	"Know Your Enemy"	Moria Armstrong	Nick Collins	Jamie Foreman and Beryl Cooke guest star	22 November 1990
Roach is the target of a villain who has recently been released from prison that is seeking revenge for the rogue DS sleeping with his wife.
282	95	"Lies"	Roger Tucker	Brendan McDonald	Adele Silva guest stars	27 November 1990
Greig leads an operation that prevents an attempted wages heist. Quinnan and Datta investigate neglect of a baby.
283	96	"Old Wounds"	Roger Tucker	Ian Briggs	Alan Ford guest stars	29 November 1990
Stamp and Young arrest the son of a suspect that died while being interviewed by Carver. Roach investigates a lorry theft.
284	97	"Just for a Moment"	Tom Cotter	Susan Shattock	Charlie Creed-Miles guest stars	4 December 1990
Datta is held hostage in custody by a disturbed man suspected of stabbing his mother.
285	98	"Market Forces"	Sarah Pia Anderson	Peter Brooks	Steven Mackintosh, Roberta Taylor and Peter Craze guest star	6 December 1990
Garfield and Quinnan investigate a stolen goods ring. Notes: Roberta Taylor would join the cast as Insp Gina Gold in 2002.
286	99	"One for the Road"	John Strickland	Michael Crompton	Philip Whitchurch, Lloyd McGuire and Tracey Wilson guest star	11 December 1990
Cryer celebrates 20 years of being in the force but the limelight is later on one of his fellow sergeants. Notes: Philip Whitchurch would join the cast as Ch Insp Philip Cato in 1993.
287	100	"Start with the Whistle"	John Strickland	J.C. Wilsher	First appearance of Sgt Joseph Corrie, final regular appearance of Sgt Tom Penny; Stephen Churchett guest stars	13 December 1990
Penny decides to resign on medical grounds after being accused of drink driving.
288	101	"Out of The Blue"	Moria Armstrong	J.C. Wilsher	Alec Christie and Peter Ferdinando guest star	18 December 1990
Wray's last day at Sun Hill sees him come up against some of his closest friends while investigating a robbery.
289	102	"Street Smart"	Sarah Pia Anderson	J.C. Wilsher	First appearance of DCI Kim Reid; final appearance of DCI Gordon Wray; Robert Wisdom and Morgan Deare guest star	20 December 1990
DCI Kim Reid, Wray's replacement, arrives at Sun Hill and quickly gets on the wrong side of Burnside.
290	103	"Safe As Houses"	Tom Cotter	Russell Lewis	First appearance of Sgt John Maitland; Ken Hutchison guest stars	26 December 1990
Carver, Dashwood, Lines and Martella look after a witness to a murder but soon they find themselves in grave danger.
291	104	"Friends and Neighbours"	Mike Dormer	Christopher Russell	Brian Croucher, Doug Bradley, Allan Surtees and Richard Davies guest star	27 December 1990
DI Burnside decides DC Carver has to move into the section house to avoid three misdemeanours.
