= The Elements (Second Person album) =

Studio album by Second Person
- Released: 9 August 2007
- Recorded: October 2006 to July 2007
- Genre: Post Trip-Hop
- Length: 18:33
- Label: tba -
- Producers: Tony Platt and Mark Maclaine (The Silence)

The Elements is a special edition Post Trip Hop album produced by Second Person for Sellaband and was released on 9 August 2007.

This is the follow-up to the band's debut album, Chromatography, and was written by Julia Johnson, Mark Maclaine and Álvaro López at their studio in West London, UK. This album contains an exclusive set of tracks written for "believers" on the online music community, Sellaband. Using the website, fans raised a total of $50,000 to fund the album and since Second Person were the first UK band to achieve this goal the project has gained a great deal of worldwide media attention.

In the latter stages of production the band were joined by legendary producer/engineer: Tony Platt who is best known for his work with Bob Marley, AC/DC and Iron Maiden amongst many others. A&R supervisor for this project was Adam Sieff (former Director of Jazz at Sony Music) and despite rumours of recording it in New York the band remained in London to record and mix the album at The London Recording Studios (formerly Sarm East Studios) and The Way Studios respectively. The album was mastered by Ray Staff at Alchemy, Soho.

The record is to be accompanied by an animated short film, of the same name, that will span the length of the entire album. The first chapter of this video is called "Wood" and premiered exclusively on the front page of Bebo.com three days before the album's official release on 9 August 2007. The story follows a young girl and her journey through a world of dragons and strange creatures. The story of the remaining four chapters remains a secret but animators and artists confirmed for this project include Everton Sebben, Katy Davis and Ben King. A number of guest animators will also join the team for different sections of the story and the new videos are due for release throughout the remainder of 2007.

== Track listing ==
1. Wood
2. Fire
3. Earth
4. Metal
5. Water
