= Mark Maclaine =

- Mark Maclaine with bass. Mid 2004.

Background information
- Born: Mark Maclaine; 1980 (age 45–46); South Africa
- Genres: Trip hop, alternative rock, hip hop, jazz, electronica
- Occupations: Musician, producer, educationist, writer
- Instruments: Bass guitar, guitar
- Website: secondperson.net

Mark Maclaine (sometimes known as The Silence) is a British musician, educator, director, music producer, founder of Tutorfair and writer. He is best known for his work as the bass guitarist and producer for the post trip-hop band Second Person. He was a co-founder of the UK hip-hop record label Dented Records and co-owner of a film company the Silence Corporation.

== History ==
Maclaine started his career as a bass guitarist in London before eventually moving into music production. He began writing his own music under the name "The Silence". In April 2001, he started Dented Records with two members of a successful UK hip-hop group, Foreign Beggars.

In 2002, Maclaine formed the post trip-hop band Second Person with the singer and pianist Julia Johnson. They completed work on writing the music for the free-skiing trilogy 'Snow's in the House' and released their first album, Chromatography, in October 2004.

They went on to write the music score for British feature film City Rats, which was released in early 2009 and on DVD on 27 April 2009. In 2008, Maclaine produced (under his pseudonym "The Silence") the album Close to Home in New York City with the New Zealand rapper Maitreya. Two of the album's tracks were nominated for the APRA Silver Scroll Award for songwriting in New Zealand. Second Person released two further albums before parting company, after 10 years, in April 2011.

Maclaine spends much of his time tutoring but continues to produce music and videos for other artists. In 2010, he directed the music video "Questions in My Mind" by the Portuguese singer Ana Free in New York City. They worked together on two more videos, "Playgrounds and Kisses" and "Electrical Storm", both reaching number 1 in the MTV Portugal charts and filmed in Free's hometown of Lisbon and London respectively. His other work includes directing for the Africa Express project, filming their various guest musicians including Damon Albarn, Paul McCartney and John Paul Jones.

== Family ==
Maclaine's father was the director Richard MacLaine and his mother is the photographer Tana Maclaine.

== Selected film/theatre crew credits ==
- "Snows in the House 2" : music editor (2003: feature documentary film – limited cinema and DVD release)
- "Capoeira: Brazil to London" : director/producer (2003: documentary film – film festival release)
- "Verbier Ride 2004" : music editor (2004: TV series – Channel 4/Extreme Sports Channel)
- "Ave Maria" : film editor (2004: short film – festival release)
- "Snows in the House 3" : music editor (2004: feature film – limited cinema and DVD release)
- "S.W.A.T." : supervising sound editor (2004: short film – festival release with awards)
- "Tricks & Tips" : sound re-recordist (2005: TV series – Extreme Sports Channel)
- "Surf Breaks" : sound re-recordist (2005: TV series – Extreme Sports Channel)
- "Downfall" : supervising sound editor (2005: short film – festival release)
- "The L.A. Hardcore" : sound editor/re-recording mixer (2005: TV series – Extreme Sports Channel)
- "Dolls" : supervising sound editor (2006: short film – Cannes and festival release & BBC/SKY featured)
- "The Passenger" : supervising sound editor/re-recording mixer (2006: short film – various festival release with awards)
- "Gumball 3000: Around the World in 8 Days" : post-sound recordist (2006: TV series – Extreme Sports Channel)
- "Streetball Extreme: Battle for Europe" : supervising sound editor (2006: TV series – Extreme Sports Channel)
- "Extreme Beach Soccer" : supervising sound editor (2006: TV series – Extreme Sports Channel)
- "Live at the Bedford – Second Person" : director/producer (2006: DVD/CD – international release)
- "Spilt Milk – Second Person" : director/producer (2007: music video – MTV, VH1 & YouTube featured video)
- "Wood – Second Person" : director/producer (2007: music video – MTV, VH1 & YouTube featured video)
- "City Rats" : sound & music director (2008: feature film – cinema and international DVD release)
- "Cheap Escape – Fandangle" : director/editor (2008: music video – Party House Records: MTV, VH1 & Kerrang TV featured)
- "Amazon.com: Sellaband" : director/editor (2008: short documentary film – Amazon.com)
- "Happy Birthday" : producer (2009: short film – People Can Run Films)
- "Burlesque Fairytales" : re-recording supervisor (2009: feature film – Double Barreled Productions)
- "Ladies' Man by Feydeau" : director (17 Jan 2010: theatre: Old Red Lion, London)
- "They Walk Among Us" : producer/editor (2010: short film)
- "Dolores by Edward Allen Baker" : director (Feb 2010: theatre: Old Red Lion, London)
- "Living into the Future" : director/co-writer (2010: short film)
- "Underachievers" : director/co-writer (2010: short film)
- "Questions – Ana Free" : director/co-producer (2010: music video)
- "Playgrounds and Kisses – Ana Free" : director/producer (2011: music video)
- "Electrical Storm – Ana Free" : director/producer (2012: music video)
- "In The Forest" : director (2013: short film)

== Selected film music credits ==
- "Dreamless" : composer (2002: feature film)
- "Snows in the House" : co-composer (2002: feature documentary film – limited cinema and DVD release)
- "Snows in the House 2" : composer/music producer (2003: feature documentary film – limited cinema and DVD release)
- "Capoeira: Brazil to London" : composer/music producer (2003: documentary film – film festival release)
- "Verbier Ride 2004" : composer/music producer (2004: TV series – Channel 4/Extreme Sports Channel)
- "Ave Maria" : composer/music producer (2004: short film – festival release)
- "Snows in the House 3" : composer/music producer (2004: feature film – limited cinema and DVD release)
- "S.W.A.T." : composer/music producer (2004: short film – festival release with awards)
- "The L.A. Hardcore" : music editor (2005: TV series – Extreme Sports Channel)
- "Dolls" : music producer/orchestral mixer (2006: short film – Cannes and festival release & BBC/SKY featured)
- "The Passenger" : composer/music producer (2006: short film – various festival release with awards)
- "Genex" : series theme composer (2006: TV series – Extreme Sports Channel)
- "Streetball Extreme: Battle for Europe" : composer/music producer (2006: TV series – Extreme Sports Channel)
- "Extreme Beach Soccer" : series theme composer (2006: TV series – Extreme Sports Channel)
- "Live at the Bedford – Second Person" : music producer/mixer (2006: DVD/CD – international release)
- "Spilt Milk – Second Person" : composer/music producer (2007: music video – MTV, VH1 & YouTube featured video)
- "Wood – Second Person" : composer/music producer (2007: music video – MTV, VH1 & YouTube featured video)
- "The Vanguard" : music producer/mixer (2008: feature film – Lionsgate Films: limited cinema & worldwide DVD release)
- "City Rats" : composer (2008: feature film – cinema and international DVD release)
- "Burlesque Fairytales" : music producer (2010: feature film 35mm – Double Barreled Productions)

== Selected music/album credits ==
Year	Album	Artist	Role
2004	Chromatography	Second Person	Co-writer/producer
2004	Infrastructure; Single track: hip-hop	Stone Circle	Writer/producer
2005	Simplicity of Mind; Album: hip-hop	Ti1	Producer/mixer/writer
2006	Live at the Bedford; Live DVD: electronica/trip-hop	Second Person	Producer/mixer
2006	You And Others; Album: rock	Vega 4	Editor to Jacknife Lee
2006	Live at Smolenskys; Album: jazz	Sol Chango	Producer/mixer
2007	The Healing Process; Album: metal	Flict	Mixer
2007	The Elements; Album: electronica/trip-hop	Second Person	Co-producer/co-writer
2008	Close To Home; Album: hip-hop	Maitreya	Producer/mixer
2008	The Vanguard: Music from the Motion Picture; Film soundtrack/film score	Mark Delany	Producer/mixer/mastering
2009	Until The Morning Light; Album: pop/rock	Daniel Ward-Murphy	Remix producer
2009	Circles and Squares; Album: pop/rock	Francis Rodino	Synths and programming
2009	Unseen; Album: pop/rock	Ellie Williams	Synths and programming
2011	Come to Dust; Album: electronica/trip-hop	Second Person	Producer/mixer
