= The Bill series 7 =

The Bill
- Series 7
- Series 7 (Australian DVD Cover)
- No. of episodes: 105

Release
- Original network: ITV
- Original release: 1 January – 31 December 1991

Series chronology
- ← Previous; Series 6 Next → Series 8

The seventh series of The Bill, a British television drama, consists of 105 episodes, broadcast between 1 January and 31 December 1991. The series was released on DVD for the first time on 6 June 2012, in Australia. It features the above artwork, which features images of Sgt Alec Peters and WDC Viv Martella.

A number of cast and crew commentaries for Series 7 episodes have been recorded, available exclusively for subscribers of The Bill Podcast Patreon Channel. These include "The Chase", "Cry Havoc", "Lest We Forget", "The Negotiator" and "They Also Serve".

All the major storylines and characters featured in 1991 are reviewed by TV historian Edward Kellett in the book Reaching A Verdict: Reviewing The Bill (1990-1992)

== Cast changes ==
=== Arrivals ===
- Sgt Matthew Boyden (Episode 90–)
- WPC Donna Harris (Episode 93–)

=== Departures ===
- Sgt Joseph Corrie – Unexplained
- PC Phil Young – Commits suicide

== Episodes ==
No. overall	No. in series	Title	Directed by	Written by	Episode notes	Original release date
292	1	"Grief"	Graham Theakston	Arthur McKenzie	Samantha Janus, Elizabeth Bradley and Eve White guest star	1 January 1991
It's a frustrating day for everyone at Sun Hill, from Brownlow to Dashwood with Hollis in between.
293	2	"The Chase"	Stuart Urban	Carol Harrison	Richard Graham and Ian Liston guest star	3 January 1991
While investigating wheels stolen from a car, Loxton and Hollis are called to pursue armed robbers who have robbed a garage. Datta risks her life in order to save a baby after arriving at the garage. Tragedy strikes as Loxton in Sierra One collides with another vehicle. In 2021, director Stuart Urban, producer Tony Virgo, script editor Tim Vaughan, stunt co-ordinator Nick Gillard and actor Tom Butcher (PC Steve Loxton) recorded a two-part Video Commentary for this episode
294	3	"The Attack"	John Black	Philip Palmer	—	8 January 1991
Marshall is assaulted by two lager louts and CID conduct a stakeout in anticipation of a warehouse robbery.
295	4	"Crown V. Cooper"	Michael Kerrigan	Jane Hollowood	Robin Sachs and Nicholas Courtney guest star	10 January 1991
Loxton faces a hard day when he is called to court.
296	5	"The Girl Can't Help It"	John Strickland	Arthur McKenzie	Trevor Peacock and Shirley Stelfox guest star	15 January 1991
Quinnan and Ackland investigate a report of a missing teenage girl. Quinnan finds her diary which indicates that she is working as a prostitute. When he breaks the news to her father it comes as no surprise.
297	6	"Machines"	Bob Gabriel	Peter J. Hammond	Meera Syal, Royce Mills and Henry Goodman guest star	17 January 1991
Roach and Carver put pressure on a defendant who postpones his appearance in court owing to illness. Lines is on the trail of photocopiers stolen from an American base.
298	7	"Loophole"	John Strickland	Michael Baker	Donald Bisset and Arthur Whybrow guest star	22 January 1991
Young is showing the first signs of post-traumatic stress disorder. While investigating a spate of burglaries targeting elderly people living on a council estate, Carver discovers the motive is more complex than first thought.
299	8	"Bottle"	Graham Theakston	Arthur McKenzie	—	24 January 1991
Maitland investigates an assault by a pub landlord which has the potential to ruin a CID operation.
300	9	"Samaritan"	John Black	Brian Finch	David Bamber and Mary Jo Randle guest star	29 January 1991
Stamp and Stringer come across a man and a woman struggling. The man claims he was only trying to assist her, but Burnside suspects that he might be a sex offender. Notes: Mary Jo Randle would join the cast as WDC, later WDS, Jo Morgan in 1993.
301	10	"Fear or Favour"	Mike Dormer	Christopher Russell	Rudolph Walker, Karl Collins and Louis Mahoney guest star	31 January 1991
Three representatives from the Jasmine Allen Estate hold a meeting with Brownlow and Conway complaining about police racial harassment. Shortly afterwards, Stamp and French arrest one of the men for assaulting Ackland during an affray. Questions are raised as to whether he has been unfairly targeted. Notes: Karl Collins would join the cast as DC Danny Glaze in 1999.
302	11	"Start To Finish"	Laura Sims	Graham Ison	Guest appearance of ex-Sgt Tom Penny; Patrick Jordan guest star	5 February 1991
Brownlow attends an interview, hoping to secure a position on a senior command course. Tom Penny in his new role as a private security officer finds that he is regarded as an outsider at Sun Hill.
303	12	"Night and Day"	Michael Owen Morris	Russell Lewis	John Woodnutt guest stars	7 February 1991
Stamp and Stringer are stopped in the street by a man who says his flat has been burgled and the burglars are still on the premises.
304	13	"Favours"	Bob Blagden	Martyn Wade	Stuart McGugan, Margery Mason and Ron Pember guest star	12 February 1991
Dashwood and Roach investigate a burglary at a scrapyard which has a connection to an ex-police officer who knows Roach. Marshall investigates when an elderly woman reports that she is receiving threatening letters from her husband.
305	14	"In Chambers"	Michael Owen Morris	Carolyn Sally Jones	John Moulder-Brown, Valentine Pelka, Robert Gwilym, Louise Jameson and Christian Rodska guest star	14 February 1991
Greig has built up a case against an arsonist only to find out from the prosecution legal team that the accused has claimed mental impairment. Ford arrests a man on suspicion of shoplifting.
306	15	"Kids Don't Cry Anymore"	Tom Cotter	Barry Appleton	Patrick O'Connell and Rita May guest star	19 February 1991
Ackland intervenes when a boy is being bullied in a playground and finds in his lunchbox a book detailing illicit drug dealing. Roach is assigned the task of assisting an ex-colleague who is employed as a private security officer, a man whom Roach detests.
307	16	"Too Many Chiefs"	David Hayman	Tony Etchells	Simon O’Brien guest star	21 February 1991
After dropping off a girl at a children's home, Quinnan and Marshall get called back in for a potential suicide.
308	17	"Every Mother's Son"	Laura Sims	Patrick Harkins	Stefan Kalipha guest stars	26 February 1991
Ackland, Stamp, Quinnan and Hollis are doing an obbo.
309	18	"Furthers"	Brian Farnham	Robin Mukherjee	Nigel Terry, Felicity Montagu and Johnnie Wade guest star	28 February 1991
A man is murdered by a shotgun after talking to Dashwood. Jack Meadows appears again before becoming a main character.
310	19	"Closing The Net"	Michael Brayshaw	Robin Mukherjee	Ian Bleasdale, Caroline Webster and Harry Fielder guest star	5 March 1991
Sun Hill gets a call about a man who approached a young girl at a park. Lines and Martella believe he is a serial offender and are in the process of constructing a profile when the man strikes again, this time abducting a girl.
311	20	"The Public Interest"	Sarah Pia Anderson	Christopher Russell	Geoffrey Freshwater guest stars	7 March 1991
A man comes in to Sun Hill to report that a middle-aged ex-employee is having a relationship with a 15-year-old girl. When Ackland is informed that the case of assault against her has been dropped by the CPS, she questions the worth of her career and the role of police.
312	21	"Photo Finish"	Bob Blagden	David Hoskins	Chesney Hawkes, Sharon Duce and Paul Reynolds guest star	12 March 1991
Datta and Garfield are conducting an observation on a drug dealer from the bedroom of a teenage boy. When Garfield finds a large sum of money hidden in a Playboy magazine, he suspects that the lad might also be dealing drugs. Ford receives a tip about a horse race and Loxton offers to place a bet on her behalf.
313	22	"Just Desserts"	Alan Bell	Christopher Russell	Mary Healey, John Rolfe and Helen Blatch guest star	14 March 1991
Burnside and Lines go for a lunchtime drink. Stamp and Garfield go to a building site where a self-employed tiler fell off the top floor.
314	23	"832 Receiving"	Alan Bell	Barbara Cox	Vilma Hollingbery, Jaye Griffiths and Don Gilet guest star	19 March 1991
Ackland and French catch a teenage girl who has stolen a purse. When they return to her home, Ackland suspects the mother is committing fraud. French is later called to a sudden infant death and is overwhelmed by her emotions. Notes: Jaye Griffiths would join the cast as DS, later DI, Sally Johnson in 1993.
315	24	"The Better Part of Valour"	David Hayman	Arthur McKenzie	Robert Carlyle, Richard Beale and Leslie Schofield guest star	21 March 1991
A security van is ambushed and robbed of a substantial sum of money. Sun Hill is working as a team to solve the case except for Roach who is going it alone.
316	25	"Double Or Quits"	Bill Pryde	Rib Davis	Su Elliot, Ian Gelder, John Ramm and Nicola Stapleton guest star	26 March 1991
Martella gives evidence in court and plays a gambit that could backfire. Roach is on the trail of a sex trafficker.
317	26	"We Could Be Heroes"	John Strickland	Tony Etchells	Robert Blythe and Mark Lewis Jones guest star	28 March 1991
Stamp and Quinnan rush an injured woman to hospital when the ambulance is delayed after an accident.
318	27	"Cold Turkey, Part One: Lifeline"	Gordon Flemyng	J. C. Wilsher	Rupert Holliday-Evans, Andrew Burt, Keith Marsh, Renu Setna and David Quilter guest star	2 April 1991
Stamp and Quinnan investigate the death of a man who it is revealed is a locum G.P. with a history of overprescribing controlled drugs. Ackland encounters a man armed with a knife at a pharmacy. Stamp and Quinnan are later called to a flat where a neighbour has reported hearing a violent argument.
319	28	"Cold Turkey, Part Two: Late Turn Sunday"	Gordon Flemyng	J.C. Wilsher	Rupert Holliday-Evans guest stars	4 April 1991
A man suffering severe barbiturate withdrawal is holding a woman and her young boy hostage in a flat. The Sun Hill police attempt to negotiate a peaceful outcome.
320	29	"Now We're Motoring"	Michael Brayshaw	J.C. Wilsher	Mary Tamm and David Sibley guest star	9 April 1991
Hollis assists a tow truck driver to tow away a luxury sports car, only to find out that he has abetted a stolen car syndicate. Meanwhile, Lines is working undercover to catch the same gang with the assistance of an unwitting DCI Reid.
321	30	"Dead Man's Boots"	John Glenister	Julian Jones	Liz Smith guest stars	11 April 1991
Cryer tries to stop an elderly woman, who gave evidence as a witness in a murder trial, from being victimised on a council estate. The vacant position of duty sergeant is on offer at Sun Hill.
322	31	"Caught Napping"	John Strickland	Russell Lewis	David Banks guest stars	16 April 1991
The Metropolitan Police Serious Crimes Squad sweep into Sun Hill and commandeer the station's briefing room, setting a few noses out of joint in the process.
323	32	"Hammer To Fall"	Richard Holthouse	Russell Lewis	Gary Whelan guest stars	18 April 1991
In an attempt to end the rift between DI Burnside and DS Roach, DCI Reid partners them together on a joint operation with the drugs squad. Notes: Gary Whelan would join the cast as DI Harry Haines in 1993.
324	33	"Cry Havoc"	Stuart Urban	Russell Lewis	Marc Warren guest stars	23 April 1991
Quinnan and Stamp go to Whitegate Estate to arrest a man involved in a glassing the night before. When Peters tries to apprehend the assailant, he is stabbed and rushed to hospital. In 2020, director Stuart Urban recorded an audio commentary for this episode.
325	34	"Rules of Engagement"	David Attwood	Elizabeth Anne-Wheal	Shaun Scott guest stars	25 April 1991
WDC Martella is undercover at a club to investigate a series of armed robberies of musical equipment. Notes: Shaun Scott would join the cast as DS Chris Deakin in 1994.
326	35	"Delivery on Time"	David Attwood	Jonathan Myerson	Ian Collier guest stars	30 April 1991
PC Stringer and WPC Marshall are walking the beat when they are called to a burglary.
327	36	"Black Monday"	Alan Bell	Peter J. Hammond	Marcia Warren guest stars	2 May 1991
DC Lines' car gets towed away. He catches a bus and sees a man who is supposed to have died five years before.
328	37	"Jobs for the Boys"	Alan Bell	Carolyn Sally Jones	Bob Mason, Michael Bilton and Colin Higgins guest star	7 May 1991
DI Burnside investigates a break-in at a cash-and-carry, involving the theft of cash and some meat.
329	38	"Without Consent"	Derek Lister	Julian Jones	Martin Marquez guest stars	9 May 1991
A prostitute comes into the station to report a rape. Loxton tells her it is classed as non-payment of goods, and Ackland has problems making people treat it as a rape. Notes: Martin Marquez would join the cast as DS Danny Pearce in 1993.
330	39	"Saints and Martyrs"	John Glenister	Christopher Russell	Walter Sparrow guest stars	14 May 1991
WPC Ackland investigates a break-in and theft of a pension book. She is told that the CPS won't be taking up her assault case so she brings a private summons.
331	40	"Observation"	Sarah Pia Anderson	Martyn Wade	—	16 May 1991
DCI Reid takes over a joint surveillance operation.
332	41	"The Greater Good"	Mike Dormer	David Hoskins	Barry Jackson guest stars	21 May 1991
Tosh and Jim are watching a wrecking yard. A car is seen driven into the yard stolen from a man who runs a youth centre.
333	42	"The Best You Can Buy"	Moira Armstrong	Christopher Russell	Karl Collins and Donald Douglas guest star	23 May 1991
WPC Ackland's private prosecution of Everton Warwick comes to court. Karl Collins would join the regular cast as DC Danny Glaze in 1999.
334	43	"Addict"	Chris Lovett	Victoria Taylor	Laurence Harrington guest stars	25 May 1991
Quinnan arrests two men in the underground because one has a knife. Sgt Peters' wife gives him a ride to work. Brownlow, Conway and Reid have a meeting with publicans.
335	44	"Black Mark"	Bill Pryde	Phillip Palmer	—	30 May 1991
Dashwood talks to one of his snouts, who has been charged with stealing, on the way to court. The prisoner makes a complaint against him.
336	45	"The Right Thing To Do"	Brian Parker	Kieran Prendiville	Anton Phillips, Tony Guilfoyle and Valentine Nonyela guest star	4 June 1991
Lines and Carver go to a club where they find drugs in the band's jackets.
337	46	"The Harder They Fall"	Chris Lovett	Tony Etchells	—	6 June 1991
PC Loxton is attacked after a break-in at a nightclub and helped by a cabbie who is a special constable. Jack Meadows appears again.
338	47	"Something Personal"	Brian Parker	Brendan J. Cassin	Michael Robbins guest stars	11 June 1991
DCs Dashwood and Carver are driving along when they notice a man trying to break into a house. PC Stamp chases a burglar and pulls his trousers off trying to stop him climbing over a wall.
339	48	"Hijack"	Derek Lister	Phillip Palmer	Ian Burfield guest stars	13 June 1991
Burnside talks to the driver of a lorry who was hijacked.
340	49	"With Intent"	Bill Pryde	Carolyn Sally Jones	Peter Wight, Stephen Boxer and Owen Brenman guest star	18 June 1991
DCs Lines and Carver are going to court about a burglary case. The Crown Prosecution Service (CPS) is reducing the charges against two of the defendants.
341	50	"Initiative"	Mike Dormer	J.C. Wilsher	Helen Pearson and Gerry Cowper guest star	20 June 1991
PCs Garfield and Young are talking to a woman about fireworks that had been put through her letterbox when they witness a purse snatching.
342	51	"Careless Whispers"	Derek Lister	Edward Dumas	Joan Ann Maynard and Garry Cooper guest star	25 June 1991
DI Burnside arrests a man on suspicion of robbery with violence. DC Lines and Carver get given wrong addresses.
343	52	"Minimum Force"	William Brayne	Simon Andrew Stirling	Jo-Anne Knowles guest stars	27 June 1991
Stamp and Garfield go to a burglary. The homeowner has caught the burglar and beaten him up. His wife comes back and says the burglar was a work mate collecting some pills for her.
344	53	"Skeletons"	Brian Farnham	Kevin Clarke	Alex Kingston, Martine McCutcheon, Ken Campbell and Jamila Massey guest star	2 July 1991
WPC Ackland finds a man stabbed in his car, and DC Lines' investigation into the incident is impeded by the victim's unhelpful wife. PC Hollis and PC Stamp discover a number of human skeletons in a supposedly vacant flat.
345	54	"Targets"	Suri Krishnamma	J.C. Wilsher	Tim Dry and Jake Wood guest star	4 July 1991
DAC Hicks talks about reclaiming the streets. DCI Reid talks about her pilot project on street robberies. PC Stamp is at a traffic depot by a cemetery and talks to a youth he suspects of criminal damage.
346	55	"The Negotiator"	Stuart Urban	Paul Bond	Roger Lloyd-Pack, Kathy Burke and Wendy Padbury guest star	9 July 1991
PC Hollis chases a man with a shotgun into a shop. Hollis tries talking the gunman, who has just held up a building society, into letting the assistant go. In 2020, director Stuart Urban and camera operator Alison Chapman recorded an audio commentary for this episode.
347	56	"Reputations"	Suri Krishnamma	Simon Moss	Meera Syal guest stars	11 July 1991
Carver talks to his snout about a security job and gets a name for a burglary instead.
348	57	"The Juggler and the Fortune Teller"	Alan Bell	Barry Appleton	Victoria Burgoyne, Nigel Harman and Larry Martyn guest star	16 July 1991
A court case is adjourned. DI Burnside and the defence counsel have an argument in the corridor. WDC Martella goes back to the station to warn witnesses.
349	58	"Joey"	Derek Lister	J.C. Wilsher	Penelope Nice, Neil Maskell and Adam Godley guest star	18 July 1991
WPC Ackland is watching a P.E. class at a school before talking to them about theft and robbery. PC Loxton chases a boy who has stolen a lady's chain. The boy appears too frightened to tell his name.
350	59	"Your Shout"	Bill Pryde	Julian Jones	Maureen Beattie and Nadia Chambers guest star	23 July 1991
Ch Supt Brownlow speaks to WPC Marshall about a promotion board.
351	60	"Ladykiller"	Moira Armstrong	Steve Trafford	—	25 July 1991
Martella drives to a car fire to find a lady trapped in her car. She discovers a man who tried to get her out saw someone watching as he arrived.
352	61	"A Corporal of Horse"	Mike Vardy	Julian Jones	William Gaminara, Kathleen Byron, Kevin Stoney and David Michaels guest star	30 July 1991
Marshall is acting sergeant with C relief. She clashes with members of the relief and struggles to impose discipline.
353	62	"Cause and Effect"	Jan Sargent	Christopher Russell	Susan Wooldridge guest stars	1 August 1991
French and Stamp discuss the merits of follow up calls. They get a call out to research labs. Loxton finds a security guard on the floor.
354	63	"Getting Involved"	Richard Holthouse	Stephen Churchett	—	6 August 1991
Stamp talks to a man about paint stripper on his car – the second time in a month. Hollis and Ackland are later called to an industrial estate where a man is damaging the car. Smollett is able to work out the meaning behind it.
355	64	"Benefit of the Doubt"	Mike Vardy	Jonathan Myerson	David McAlister guest stars	8 August 1991
A judge is arrested for GBH on a prostitute. He uses his phone call to ring DAC Hicks. Brownlow is concerned about wrongful arrest.
356	65	"Crack-Up"	William Brayne	Barry Appleton	John Grillo guest stars	13 August 1991
Hollis is in a pawn brokers when a man wearing a hat, scarf, and glasses leaves carrying a bike helmet, leaving behind a bag with a gun in it.
357	66	"The Last Laugh"	Denny Lawrence	Duncan Gould	Tom Chadbon and Nigel Lambert guest star	15 August 1991
Quinnan and Garfield respond to an armed robbery that turns out to be a wind-up.
358	67	"Access"	Brian Parker	Tony Attard	Michael Feast guest stars	20 August 1991
CID investigate a burglary of an O.A.P. who has an asthma attack. Stamp talks to a lady who turned away a man supposedly from the Gas Board.
359	68	"Six of One"	Sharon Miller	Rib Davis	Susan Lynch guest stars	22 August 1991
Stringer is beaten to the arrest of a girl robbery suspect by Stamp in the area car. His day gets worse when he is suspected of stealing some of the missing jewellery.
360	69	"Married to the Job"	Brian Parker	Roger Leach	Bernard Holley guest stars	27 August 1991
PC Stamp and WPC Ackland attend a domestic and deal with a burglary at a pub. Stamp's girlfriend has broken up with him after talking to other police wives.
361	70	"Domestic"	Graham Theaktson	Phillip Palmer	—	29 August 1991
DCI Reid goes to see the CPS about a case and is late for a meeting with Meadows from the Murder Squad. A rape victim says the allegation was false after the CPS gave the go ahead for the case to go to court.
362	71	"Stress Rules"	Jan Sargent	Robin Mukherjee	René Zagger guest stars	3 September 1991
Brownlow comes back from a conference and wants to start an anti-stress programme. A boy is stabbed and Young and Marshall investigate. Notes: René Zagger would join the cast as PC Nick Klein in 1999.
363	72	"They Also Serve"	David Hayman	Russell Lewis	John Bennett guest stars	5 September 1991
The relief are acting as reserve troops for a demonstration. At a meal break, Delia, Norika and June find a distressed probationer in the toilets. In 2020, camera operator Alison Chapman recorded an audio commentary for this episode.
364	73	"Inside Job"	Denny Lawrence	Simon Moss	—	10 September 1991
A shop assistant is attacked and robbed of the week's takings by thieves on a motorcycle.
365	74	"Bones of Contention"	Sarah Pia Anderson	Susan Shattock	—	12 September 1991
Sgt Cryer investigates when anonymous letters expose PC Stringer's affair, in police time, with a prisoner's wife. WPC Datta and PC Stamp lie in wait for a blackmailer. Ch Insp Conway is frustrated at a lack of promotion.
366	75	"Wide of The Mark"	Chris Lovett	David Hoskins	Michael Goldie and Gordon Salkilld guest star	17 September 1991
A professional hired killer is active in Sun Hill. A dubious informant provides a tip-off that divides DI Burnside and D.S. Greig.
367	76	"Hitting The Mark"	Mike Dormer	Steve Trafford	Jo Rowbottom, Michael Goldie and Gordon Salkilld guest star	19 September 1991
DI Burnside hunts for a hired killer to prevent him from making his next hit.
368	77	"Bending the Rules"	Alan Bell	Eric Deacon	David Quilter guest stars	24 September 1991
A yob arrested for shoplifting turns out to be a respected police officer. DI Burnside unravels the story of the change in his behaviour.
369	78	"Skint"	Graham Theakston	Brendan Martin	—	26 September 1991
It's PC Garfield's birthday, but a party only adds to his money troubles.
370	79	"Friday and Counting"	Bill Pryde	Barry Appleton	Dominic Guard and Leonard Maguire guest star	1 October 1991
Hollis, a missing handbag, and a recluse police pensioner, all help to unravel a murder investigation.
371	80	"Lest We Forget"	Bill Pryde	Victoria Taylor	Dermot Crowley guest stars	3 October 1991
Ch Supt Brownlow is questioned by Yorkshire Police about his involvement in a murder enquiry seventeen years before that led to a wrongful conviction. In 2021, Peter Ellis (Ch Supt Brownlow), Huw Higginson (PC George Garfield) and script editor Tim Vaughan recorded a two-part Video Commentary for this episode
372	81	"Nutters"	Richard Holthouse	Phillip Palmer	Dicken Ashworth and Daniel Peacock guest star	8 October 1991
AMIP investigates the murder of a teenager at a nightclub.
373	82	"Downtime"	Richard Holthouse	Peter J. Hammond	Patricia Quinn and Iain Rattray guest star	10 October 1991
A suspected violent break-in begins to suggest more clues about the house's occupants than anything else – especially as they are missing.
374	83	"Out of Order"	David Hayman	Dave Simpson	Final appearance of Sgt Joseph Corrie	15 October 1991
PC Young reaches out to WPC Datta and, when she rejects his advances, he sexually assaults her.
375	84	"Empire Building"	Nicholas Laughland	Phillip Palmer	—	17 October 1991
Duty Sgt Cryer sets up a major operation to arrest defaulters on fine payments. Sgt Peters accuses him of empire building.
376	85	"Innocence"	Sarah Pia Anderson	Victoria Taylor	Title sequence updated; Ray Winstone guest stars	22 October 1991
Following his interview about a wrongful conviction and allegations of corruption against a former colleague, Ch Supt Brownlow meets up with him. Two boys are reported missing and are believed to have been abducted.
377	86	"Losing It"	Jim Goddard	Russell Lewis	—	24 October 1991
PC Young discovers a suicide and is deeply affected. Later, he visits Datta in the section house and attacks her.
378	87	"Shots"	Chris Lovett	J.C. Wilsher	Patsy Palmer and Thomas Craig guest star	29 October 1991
Sun Hill officers attend a firearms training course. When an armed villain is reported in a building, PC Loxton shoots.
379	88	"The Square Peg"	Jim Goddard	Christopher Russell	Final appearance of PC Phil Young	31 October 1991
Young goes missing on his beat. Monroe orders a search. Quinnan and Loxton find Young's body in his car. He has committed suicide by feeding exhaust fumes into the vehicle.
380	89	"A Question of Confidence"	Jan Sargent	Robin Mukherjee	Katharine Rogers guest stars	5 November 1991
DI Burnside investigates a series of attacks on prostitutes. A prison escapee is suspected.
381	90	"Balls in the Air"	Sharon Miller	J.C. Wilsher	First appearance of Sgt Matthew Boyden	7 November 1991
On his first day at Sun Hill, Sgt Matthew Boyden's past life catches up with him. Boyden shows that he knows all the angles, and Insp Monroe is not impressed with his casual approach.
382	91	"The Taste"	Alan Bell	Julian Jones	Caroline Milmoe and James Coombes guest star	12 November 1991
Smollett discovers he still has the taste for action.
383	92	"Turning Back The Clock"	Aisling Walsh	Barry Appleton	Neil Dudgeon and David Quilter guest star	14 November 1991
DI Burnside is determined to clear up a three-year-old case of robbery and murder when an old acquaintance is released from prison. DCs Carver and Lines begin to have their doubts when they learn their tailing operation is "unofficial".
384	93	"Discretion"	Niall Leonard	Edward Dumas	First appearance of PC Donna Harris; Frank Mills and Kevork Malikyan guest star	19 November 1991
On his first day as Home Beat Officer, PC Smollett investigates the mugging of an old lady and discovers a rather unusual high-rise supermarket. Meanwhile, PC Stringer deals with a boy found unconscious by the canal.
385	94	"Chapter and Verse"	Aisling Walsh	Carolyn Sally Jones	—	21 November 1991
DI Burnside wants to question a man about a missing girl, but he is "drunk and incapable" in the custody suite and Sgt Maitland is determined to uphold PACE.
386	95	"The Whole Truth"	Duncan Gould	Geoff McQueen	Eve Pearce and James Walker guest star	26 November 1991
WPC Datta is in court to testify in a drink-driving trial, but the case is complicated by a mouthwash that the defendant claims to have taken.
387	96	"Profit and Loss"	Nicholas Laughland	Tony Etchells	—	28 November 1991
Sun Hill CID investigate a suspicious death.
388	97	"Thicker Than Water"	Sarah Pia Anderson	Matthew Wingett	—	3 December 1991
PCs Loxton and Stringer are called to a domestic disturbance. The man found beating his wife turns out to be a PC from Stafford Row.
389	98	"On The Take"	Patrick Lau	Steve Trafford	—	5 December 1991
DS Roach is investigating an armed robbery. A series of unexplained tip-offs reveals the possibility that a DS at Sun Hill is guilty of corruption.
390	99	"Caring"	Aisling Walsh	Anthony Valentine	Ann Mitchell guest stars	10 December 1991
WPC Ackland and PC Smollett deal with a possible case of wife battering. The alleged victim, the mother of a schizophrenic son, is uncooperative.
391	100	"The Sorcerer's Apprentice"	Derek Lister	Victoria Taylor	Jonny Lee Miller, Ian Mercer and Zig Byfield guest star	12 December 1991
DCI Reid tries to overcome the continuing clash of personalities with DI Burnside. DS Roach has problems when a juvenile prisoner lies about his age, then has an epileptic fit in his cell. DC Carver finds himself in a conflict of loyalties.
392	101	"Imposters"	Bill Hays	Tony McHale	James Hooton, Ronan Vibert and Kevin Allen guest star	17 December 1991
Maitland and Monroe investigate a pornography racket. Marshall and Stamp look for a beggar who seduced a mentally-retarded girl.
393	102	"A Woman Scorned"	Derek Lister	Victoria Taylor	—	19 December 1991
Ackland and Smollett call on a lady about her husband's dog who has dug up a skeleton in the garden. There is a new Det Supt of the Murder Squad replacing Meadows. Reid talks to Burnside about paperwork.
394	103	"Vital Statistics"	Jeremy Summers	Christopher Russell	TBA	24 December 1991
A Relief is stung into action on discovering that their arrest rate is inferior to that of B Relief. Guest cast: Annette Badland, Chris Gascoyne, Matt Bardock, Victoria Alcock, Val McLane, and John Cater; Notes: Hour-long episode
395	104	"Decent People"	Mike Dormer	Edward Dumas	Gillian McCutcheon guest stars	26 December 1991
PC Quinnan works undercover on a building site to investigate the theft of kitchen units but finds himself in a compromising situation.
396	105	"Breakout"	Frank W. Smith	Carolyn Sally Jones	TBA	31 December 1991
On New Year's Eve, a learner driver backs into a prison van, allowing a dangerous prisoner to escape from custody. Guest cast: Lisa Geoghan, Sarah Lancashire, Caroline Quentin, Margot Leicester and Daniel Hill; Notes: Hour-long episode; guest appearance of now-DC Tony "Yorkie" Smith; Lisa Geoghan would join the cast as PC Polly Page in 1992.
