= Second Person (band) =

British trip-hop band

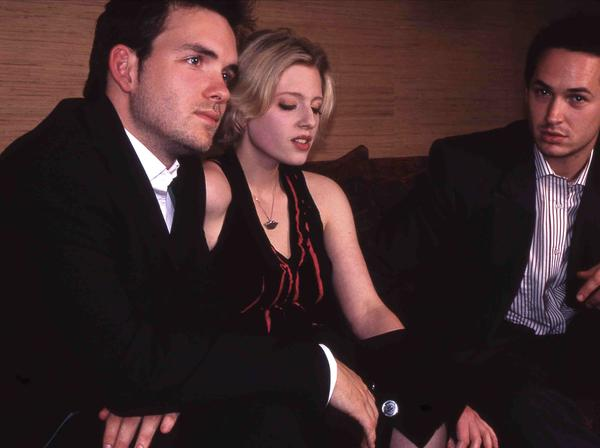
- Second Person 2005 by Annick Wolfers

Background information
- Origin: London, England
- Genres: Trip hop, electronica, downtempo, hip hop, house
- Years active: 2001–2011
- Label: Independent
- Members: Julia Johnson; Mark Maclaine; Álvaro López
- Website: http://www.secondperson.net/

Second Person were a British band that existed for 10 years between 2001 and 2011 and mixed influences from trip hop, jazz, hip hop and electronica to form post-trip hop.

== History ==
In late 2001, singer Julia Johnson and producer/bassist Mark Maclaine met, and early the following year formed the band Second Person. Drummer Álvaro López was recruited in mid-2004 to complete the final line up and their debut album Chromatography was released later that year. It went on to sell out of its initial white-label run in the United Kingdom, US and Australia through word of mouth and publicity generated by musical placements on documentaries and extreme sports films. The opening song "Too Cold To Snow" was later featured in the closing credits of 2006 film Dolls. The band went on to record a live DVD at The Bedford in London, score music for a number of British broadcasters (including BBC and Channel 4) and became one of the main suppliers of music for the international broadcaster: The Extreme Sports Channel.

The band released their second album The Elements on 9 August 2007, it was co-produced and mixed by producer/engineer Tony Platt (Bob Marley, Iron Maiden and also credited with engineering the second biggest selling album of all time: AC/DC's Back in Black). This album gained a high media profile in Europe as Second Person were the first British band to have raised the $50,000 target on Sellaband – which allowed fans to invest directly in bands on the site.

Johnson and Maclaine composed the music for the British feature film City Rats, starring Danny Dyer and Tamer Hassan and released in the cinemas in April 2009.

The band announced their split on 2 April 2011, along with the release of their third and final album: Come to Dust. This album included songs such as "Gone Fishing", the video for which (directed by Katy Davis) gained extensive play on MTV and was used as part of Cobra Beer's sponsorship of ITV movies in the UK. Other video directors include: Ebba Erikzon (Radiohead's "2+2=5" video), Mina Song (Gnarls Barkley: "Crazy"), Everton Sebben and Mark Maclaine.

In a final email to their fans the band wrote: "Second Person has always been an expression of our combined love of many styles of music and was founded on a shared desire to tell powerful stories. We had to do this during times of big change in the music industry, and although sometimes scary, it also allowed us to do things our own way. Something that kept us going was the support and love of a core group of dedicated fans. You are those people and we wanted to thank you for being there for us."

== Band members ==
- Julia Johnson – Vocals/Piano/Keyboards
- Mark Maclaine – Bass/Production/Programming
- Álvaro López – Drums/Programming

== Discography ==
=== Albums ===
- Chromatography (2004)
- Live at the Bedford (2006)
- The Elements (2007)
- Come to Dust (2011)

=== Compilations ===
- Glastonbury 2005 Album (2005)

=== Film and television scores ===
- City Rats (Feature Film – Full Score: 2009)
- Streetball Extreme: Battle for Europe (TV Series Score: 2006)
- Genex (TV Series Theme : 2006)
- The Passenger (Film Score : 2006)
- Dolls (Final Credits Music : 2006)
- Snows in the House 3 (Feature Documentary Score : 2004)
- Verbier Ride 2004 (TV Series Score : 2004)
- Snows in the House 2 (Feature Documentary Score: 2003)
