= List of Powers episodes =

List of Powers episodes may refer to:

- List of Powers (American TV series) episodes
- List of Powers (British TV series) episodes
