= C. radians =

C. radians may refer to:

- Cellana radians, the golden limpet, a marine gastropod species found in seas around New Zealand and Australia
- Cerastium radians, a synonym for Cerastium cerastoides, a flowering plant species found in Mountain regions of Europe
- Coprinellus radians, a mushroom species

== See also ==
- Radians (disambiguation)
