= City Rats =

- Theatrical release poster
- Directed by: Steve M Kelly
- Written by: Simon Fantauzzo
- Produced by: William Borthwick; Dean Fisher
- Starring: Tamer Hassan; Ray Panthaki; Susan Lynch; Kenny Doughty; MyAnna Buring; James Lance; Natasha Williams; Danny Dyer
- Cinematography: Adam Levins
- Edited by: Ben King
- Music by: Mark Maclaine (The Silence) and Julia Johnson
- Distributed by: Revolver Entertainment
- Release date: 24 April 2009
- Running time: 94 minutes
- Country: United Kingdom
- Language: English

City Rats is a feature film set in London, UK released on 24 April 2009 and starring Tamer Hassan, Ray Panthaki, Susan Lynch, Kenny Doughty, MyAnna Buring, James Lance and Natasha Williams and Danny Dyer.

== Cast ==
- Tamer Hassan as Jim
- Ray Panthaki as Dean
- Danny Dyer as Pete
- Susan Lynch as Gina
- Kenny Doughty as Olly
- MyAnna Buring as Sammy
- James Lance as Chris
- Natasha Williams as Carol
- Jake Canuso as Marco Harper
- James Doherty as Trevor
- Philip Herbert as John the Cowboy
- Katrine De Candole as Chloe
- Vyelle Croom as Darryl
- Emily Bowker as Carla
- Mathew Baynton as Barrista

== Release ==
The film premiered as part of the East End Film Festival at the Genesis Cinema Whitechapel on 24 April 2009. The following Monday it was also released on DVD and Blu-ray, reaching number 6 in the UK DVD charts, as well going on to have a limited run in cinemas.

=== Critical reception ===
Critical reaction to City Rats has been universally negative, with the film being one of a select few to earn a 0% rating at Rotten Tomatoes.

== Music ==
The score for this film was composed by Mark Maclaine and Julia Johnson from London-based post-trip hop band Second Person and includes the track "Paper Umbrella". Other tracks were provided by Spencer Hickson.
