= The Bill series 8 =

The Bill
- Series 8
- Series 8 (Australian DVD Cover)
- No. of episodes: 105

Release
- Original network: ITV
- Original release: 2 January – 31 December 1992

Series chronology
- ← Previous; Series 7 Next → Series 9

The eighth series of The Bill, a British television drama, consists of 105 episodes, broadcast between 2 January and 31 December 1992. The series was released on DVD for the first time on 6 June 2012, in Australia. The cover features images of PC Steve Loxton and DC Mike Dashwood.

A number of cast and crew commentaries for Series 8 episodes have been recorded, available exclusively for subscribers of The Bill Podcast Patreon Channel. These include the episodes "Acting Detective", "Dinosaur" and "Just Send Some Flowers".

All the major storylines and characters featured in 1992 are reviewed by TV historian Edward Kellett in the book Reaching A Verdict: Reviewing The Bill (1990-1992).

== Cast changes ==
=== Arrivals ===
- DCI Jack Meadows (Episode 24–)
- DC Alan Woods (Episode 56–)
- WPC Polly Page (Episode 83–)
- PC Gary McCann (Episode 90–)

=== Departures ===
- DCI Kim Reid – Promoted to Detective Superintendent at MS15
- WPC Suzanne Ford – Unexplained
- WPC Delia French – Unexplained
- Sgt Alec Peters – Moved to Duty Sergeant
- DC Mike Dashwood – Transferred to the Antiques Squad

== Episodes ==
No. in series	Title	Directed by	Written by	Episode notes	Original release date
1	"The Best Policy"	Derek Lister	Victoria Taylor	Clive Wedderburn guest stars	2 January 1992
DCI Reid's influence in high places suddenly makes DI Burnside look vulnerable to criticism. CID investigate an armed robbery. Notes: Clive Wedderburn would join the cast PC Gary McCann in November.
2	"A Friend in Need"	Bill Pryde	Duncan Gould	Edmund Pegge guest stars	7 January 1992
PC Quinnan is the subject of a civil complaint. PCs Stamp and Stringer follow up on a fire at a home for ex-psychiatric patients, but find little care in the community.
3	"Whose Side Are You On?"	Bill Hays	Duncan Gould	William Simons and Tom Kelly guest star	9 January 1992
DC Lines investigates a mugging, and tries to get the victim charged with the murder of his assailant.
4	"Lip Service"	Derek Lister	Arthur Ellis	Oliver Smith, Ian Reddington, Sherrie Hewson and Samantha Womack guest star	14 January 1992
DC Lines is enjoying an off-duty pint in his local pub and becomes involved in a bar brawl.
5	"Illegals"	Laura Sims	Christopher Russell	—	16 January 1992
DC Lines investigates when a cellarful of illegal immigrants is discovered. He enlists the help of Sgt Boyden, who takes a fancy to one of the females. Lines warns him off.
6	"Fair Play"	Niall Leonard	Mark Holloway	Alex Walkinshaw, Roger Griffiths and Jason Isaacs guest star	21 January 1992
PC Quinnan investigates the illegal sale of steroids. PC Garfield is put on the spot when his old sparring partner is arrested. Notes: Alex Walkinshaw would join the cast in 1999.
7	"Dinosaur"	Laura Sims	Victoria Taylor	Jo Martin, Trevor Byfield and Jeremy Bulloch guest star	23 January 1992
DI Burnside's unorthodox policing methods, which include flushing an informant's head down a toilet, set him on a collision course with DCI Reid, who has already received several complaints about Sun Hill officers. A video commentary for this episode with writer Tim Vaughan (credited on broadcast as Victoria Taylor) and director Laura Sims is available on The Bill Podcast.
8	"Joyride"	John Strickland	Mike Harris	Colin Spaull and Terry Molloy guest star	28 January 1992
A girl is seriously injured in a joyriding incident. Ch Supt Brownlow must decide whether he is prepared to risk a riot by sending officers into an estate to round up the culprits.
9	"Not Waving"	Richard Holthouse	Russell Lewis	Dexter Fletcher guest stars	30 January 1992
A student nurse is sexually assaulted. DI Burnside arrests the obvious suspect, but he escapes from police custody.
10	"Mates"	Derek Lister	Philip Palmer	Annie Hulley guest stars	4 February 1992
Sgt Cryer is finding being non-operational tedious. He goes undercover as a punter in a brothel, but his presence on the operation antagonises Sgt Peters. Cryer goes to sees Ch Supt Brownlow about giving up his job as duty sergeant and going back to the relief.
11	"Lost Boy"	Nicholas Laughland	Mark Holloway	Robert Glenister guest stars	6 February 1992
DS Greig is led to a vice ring when searching for a missing thirteen-year-old boy. DC Dashwood and WPC Ackland are brought into an operation against ponces running rent boys.
12	"Chicken"	Chris Lovett	Julian Jones	Liz Gebhardt guest stars,	11 February 1992
PC Stringer tries to stop some children from playing "chicken" on the railway line, but one of them is run down by a train. Sgt Peters transfers upstairs to the post of duty sergeant, swapping roles with Bob Cryer, who returns to the relief.
13	"Somebody Special"	John Strickland	Christopher Russell	Final regular appearance of DCI Kim Reid; Bronagh Gallagher guest stars	13 February 1992
Acting DI Greig tries to recruit a hardened female thief as a snout, but finds her more than a match for him. DCI Reid is promoted out of Sun Hill to MS15.
14	"Previous Convictions"	Aisling Walsh	Tony Etchells	—	18 February 1992
Investigating an apparent accident in which a man's hand is crushed in a car-breaker's yard, Sgt Maitland uncovers years of animosity, neglect and revenge.
15	"Beggar My Neighbour"	Niall Leonard	Jonathan Whitten	Beryl Cooke guest stars	20 February 1992
A tramp is attacked, leading the police into a web of crime.
16	"It's a Small World"	Bill Pryde	Barry Appleton	Ian Redford, Kenneth Cope and Paul Jerricho guest star	25 February 1992
Thinking of leaving the force, DC Dashwood is tempted by a lucrative business opportunity with a firm of security consultants.
17	"Licence"	Gordon Flemyng	Neil McKay	Sally Rogers and Tom Georgeson guest star	27 February 1992
A man convicted of strangling his wife has been released on licence, but the probation service fails to notify Sun Hill. His presence comes to light when his son causes a disturbance.
18	"Comeback"	John Darnell	Julian Jones	—	3 March 1992
The community police station run by PC Smollett is fire-bombed. The area car is stolen from PC Loxton and WPC Datta, and it is written off in an RTA.
19	"Fireproof"	Mike Dormer	Julian Jones	Rachel Victoria Roberts guest stars	5 March 1992
DI Burnside leads an investigation into the firebombing of the community police station.
20	"The Paddy Factor"	Chris Lovett	J. C. Wilsher	Edward Peel, Jimmy Yuill guest star	10 March 1992
DC Carver and WDC Martella have a car thief under observation, and see him shot as he gets into a car. The Anti-Terrorist Squad is called in, and the IRA is suspected.
21	"The Wild Rover"	Chris Lovett	J.C. Wilsher	Final appearance of WPC Suzanne Ford; Edward Peel, Jimmy Yuill and Clare Clifford guest star	12 March 1992
DS Roach ignores the Anti-Terrorist Squad, and investigates a possible IRA cell.
22	"Coincidence"	Patrick Lau	Peter J. Hammond	Rod Culbertson and Denise Black guest star	17 March 1992
A small boy known for lying claims to have been the subject of an attempted abduction in an adventure playground.
23	"Going Soft"	Derek Lister	Barry Appleton	Sharon Duncan-Brewster, Anna Cropper and Freddie Earlle guest star	19 March 1992
A routine trip to a magistrate for a warrant turns into a nightmare for DC Dashwood when he is taken prisoner by two hooded burglars.
24	"Re-Hab"	Derek Lister	Tony Etchells	First regular appearance of DCI Jack Meadows	24 March 1992
AMIP's Detective Superintendent Jack Meadows is bumped down to DCI and becomes the new boss of Sun Hill CID, much to the chagrin of Burnside. He becomes involved with a father suspected of murdering his drug addict son.
25	"Acting Detective"	Nicholas Laughland	Mark Holloway	Final appearance of PC Delia French	26 March 1992
A woman who collapsed at an airport is found to be a mule, smuggling drugs in her stomach. DI Burnside, with only limited time to mount an operation, gets WPC French to take the courier's place in an attempt to uncover the dealer. A video commentary with writer Mark Holloway is available on The Bill Podcast.
26	"Stopover"	Aisling Walsh	Peter J. Hammond	Edward Burnham guest stars	31 March 1992
PC Smollett tries to offer a follow-up service to victims of crime. A woman whose husband is in prison, and who runs a guesthouse, keeps reporting an intruder on the premises. Smollett gives her support, but PC Garfield thinks he is wasting his time.
27	"Suspects"	Richard Holthouse	Philip Palmer	Eric Deacon and Roger Blake guest star	2 April 1992
DS Greig arrests a suspect for an armed robbery, but is proved wrong.
28	"All the King's Horses"	John Darnell	Duncan Gould	—	7 April 1992
A lorry overturns and sheds its load outside a school, burying a boy and girl and putting PC Loxton to the test.
29	"Party Politics"	Alan Bell	Susan Shattock	Dominic Keating, Barbara Wilshere and Derek Martin guest star	9 April 1992
WDC Martella celebrates her birthday. DI Burnside and DS Roach go to a party attended by a crooked businessman, who makes Burnside an offer he cannot refuse.
30	"Trials and Tribulations"	Chris Lovett	Anthony Valentine	Final regular appearance of Sgt Alec Peters; Amelda Brown guest stars	14 April 1992
WPC Marshall becomes a vital witness in a murder trial, and soon realises that someone is trying to intimidate her.
31	"A Can of Worms"	Charles Beeson	Duncan Gould	Andrew Carr guest stars	16 April 1992
A traffic accident draws attention to a minicab firm.
32	"Timing"	Aisling Walsh	Russell Lewis	Robin Soans guest stars	21 April 1992
DCI Meadows tries to find the link between three arson attacks. DS Roach and DC Dashwood track down an escaped prisoner, but Roach seems more interested in his beautiful wife.
33	"A Nice Little Line in Plastic"	Sarah Pia Anderson	Margaret Simpson	—	23 April 1992
PC Quinnan and WPC Datta arrest a girl using stolen credit cards and uncover a major racket.
34	"Trial and Error"	Alan Bell	Edward Dumas	Ian McElhinney, John Hannah and Ben Aris guest star	28 April 1992
Burnside investigates an arson attack on the home of a vicious assault suspect let off by a mis-trial.
35	"Owning Up"	Charles Beeson	Martyn Wade	—	30 April 1992
PCs Loxton and Stringer follow up on a mugging but their case is nearly ruined when it collides with an investigation by DS Greig and DCI Meadows. Can WPC Ackland crack the case?
36	"Up Behind"	Sarah Pia Anderson	J.C. Wilsher	—	5 May 1992
It's Saturday night, but CID are at work trailing a known criminal believed to be responsible for a series of artifice burglaries involving pensioners.
37	"Appearances"	Patrick Lau	Simon Moss	John Duttine guest stars	7 May 1992
Following an argument with a drunken pub customer, a young barmaid is hit by a car and later dies. PCs Quinnan and Stringer have their suspicions about the customer. Could it be manslaughter?
38	"Principled Negotiation"	Gordon Flemyng	J.C. Wilsher	Pete Postlethwaite guest stars	12 May 1992
DI Burnside and DS Roach look favourably on an ex-villain with a loan-shark problem, but they expect favours in return.
39	"Sign of Our Times"	Laura Sims	David Squire	Lindsey Coulson guest stars	14 May 1992
An armed robber admits to DC Lines that redundancy and the repossession of his house made him take to crime to solve his problems.
40	"Priorities"	Anya Camilleri	Neil McKay	—	19 May 1992
PCs Stringer and Loxton attend to a theft at an old people's home and begin to suspect that the ex-policeman who runs the home is ill-treating residents.
41	"Users"	Laura Sims	Simon Moss	Elizabeth Carling guest stars	21 May 1992
WDC Martella arrests a woman for drug dealing. DI Burnside suspects that she is using teenage girls as couriers by offering them free holidays in Spain, but she is being exploited by a bigger dealer.
42	"Man of the People"	Richard Holthouse	Christopher Russell	—	26 May 1992
PC Stringer wins the election for the post of Federation Rep, beating the incumbent PC Hollis by fifty-eight votes to two. Ch Supt Brownlow decides to eat in the canteen with the other ranks, much to their discomfort.
43	"Runaway"	Derek Lister	Christopher Russell	Colin McCormack guest stars	28 May 1992
D.S Roach investigates the beating of a teenage girl, and tries to establish if his suspect is also responsible for a number of murders being investigated by AMIP.
44	"Exposures"	Richard Holthouse	Mark Holloway	Ché Walker, Gemma Craven and David Schofield guest star	2 June 1992
A young model claims that she was sexually assaulted during a photographic session. WDC Martella discovers that every picture tells a story.
45	"Better the Devil"	Jeremy Silberston	Russell Lewis	Rudolph Walker, Andrew Powell and Caroline John guest star	4 June 1992
PC Stringer gets involved with a bizarre household, and discovers a horrifying case of parental cruelty in the attic. WPC Marshall goes on attachment to the Domestic Violence Unit at Stafford Row.
46	"Prisoners"	Chris Lovett	Victoria Taylor	—	9 June 1992
Sgt Boyden and PC Hollis are hoping for a quiet night in the custody suite at Sun Hill, but that's not how it turns out.
47	"World To Rights"	Graham Theakston	Russell Lewis	Jeremy Young guest stars	11 June 1992
WPC Marshall, on attachment to the Domestic Violence Unit at Stafford Row, makes an error of judgement and is attacked by a woman's husband.
48	"Do the Right Thing"	Christopher Hodson	Marianne Colbran	—	16 June 1992
PC Stringer is mugged by a gang, and determines to get his own back. PC Quinnan and WPC Datta follow a cheque card fraudster.
49	"Hiding to Nothing"	Graham Theakston	Jonathan Rich	—	18 June 1992
PC Stamp is ambushed by a gang of youths on a local estate. In trying to assist him, WPC Ackland crashes the Area car, much to PC Loxton's delight.
50	"Punching Judy"	Moira Armstrong	Russell Lewis	—	22 June 1992
A woman lies critically injured in hospital, beaten up by her husband. DS Greig and DCI Meadows interview the husband. WPC Marshall decides to quit the Domestic Violence Unit.
51	"Vicious Circles"	Christopher Hodson	Duncan Gould	Carol Harrison guest stars	25 June 1992
PC Hollis arrests a woman for being drunk in charge of a baby, and finds himself drawn into a complicated family set-up.
52	"Up All Night"	Mike Dormer	Tony Etchells	Cindy O'Callaghan guest stars	30 June 1992
PC Garfield pursues a burglar and is beaten up. Sgt Boyden's inaction brings hostility from the relief and trouble for DS Roach.
53	"Part of the Furniture"	Udayan Prasad	Christopher Russell	Final regular appearance of DC Mike Dashwood; Linda Henry and James Garbutt guest star	2 July 1992
DC Dashwood is to be transferred to the Art and Antiques Squad. DS Roach hands him a burglary at an infants' school as a wind-up, but it develops into a case that allows Dashwood to show the others a thing or two.
54	"Snakes and Ladders"	Mike Dormer	Tony Etchells	—	7 July 1992
It's PC Garfield's first day back after the attack. The relief place bets on the likelihood of Garfield punching Sgt Boyden, but Garfield eventually takes his revenge.
55	"Street Cleaning"	Laura Sims	Christopher Russell	—	9 July 1992
Sgt Cryer gets the relief to put the Garfield-Boyden conflict behind them and get back to work, to sort out the takeover of genuine beggars' pitches by violent professional thieves.
56	"Hands Up"	Michael Simpson	Christopher Russell	First appearance of DC Alan Woods; Cheryl Hall and Rowena Cooper guest star	14 July 1992
Conway decides he needs to get back on the beat, and arrests a drunk for criminal damage.
57	"A Scandalous Act"	Anya Camilleri	Anthony Valentine	Guest appearance of now-Det Supt Kim Reid; Martine McCutcheon guest stars	16 July 1992
PC Garfield brings in a teenaged girl arrested at a drugs party, and she accuses him of sexually assaulting her.
58	"Raiders"	Brian Parker	Rib Davis	Janet Lees Price guest stars	21 July 1992
A ram-raid ends in tragedy when a boy is killed. But what was his part in the affair?
59	"Talk Out"	Brian Parker	Peter J. Hammond	—	23 July 1992
A middle-aged couple arrive at the front desk and report their neighbour missing, but WPC Ackland is not sure that they are telling the whole truth.
60	"True Confessions"	Jeremy Silberston	Edward Dumas	Tenniel Evans guest stars	28 July 1992
DS Roach is put under pressure when a suspect retracts a confession and accuses the police of oppression.
61	"Private Enterprise"	Patrick Lau	Carolyn Sally Jones	Lucy Benjamin guest stars	29 July 1992
DCI Meadows tackles CID about passing intelligence to the collator, but DS Roach is reluctant to share information relating to his current operation.
62	"Getting Through"	Andrew Higgs	Carolyn Sally Jones	Roberta Taylor and Brian Croucher guest star	4 August 1992
The night shift is saddled with a feud between two men who come to the front desk with allegations of GBH against each other. Notes: Roberta Taylor would join the cast as Insp Gina Gold in 2002.
63	"Last Night of Freedom"	Chris Clough	Lizzie Mickery	Jamie Foreman guest stars	6 August 1992
Someone is stabbed on a stag night, but the likely suspect cannot remember a thing about it.
64	"Cutting Loose"	Chris Clough	Steve Trafford	Allan Corduner and Jonathan Kydd guest star	11 August 1992
Burnside and Lines are returning a chief suspect to prison when they are ambushed by a gang of masked men, who spring him.
65	"Soft Target"	Laura Sims	Roy MacGregor	Paterson Joseph and Michael Ripper guest star	13 August 1992
PC Smollett discovers that a local villain is driving people out of their flats and reletting them to squatters. At Sun Hill, a civilian typist is discovered to be having an affair with a known villain.
66	"I've Never Been to Harrogate"	Moira Armstrong	Christopher Russell	Charles Kay guest stars	18 August 1992
DS Greig and DC Woods investigate the mysterious collapse of an old lady who has been burgled.
67	"Human Resources"	Andrew Higgs	Robert Jones	Bruce Alexander guest stars	20 August 1992
Two con men are preying on women through the small ads in the local paper. Lack of personnel for DS Roach's operation places WDC Martella in danger.
68	"Exit"	Tom Cotter	Peter J. Hammond	Sarah Alexander guest stars	25 August 1992
A loan shark is attacked. DS Greig has a vital witness who is young, blonde and pretty, but she keeps stringing him along, and then disappears.
69	"Loyalties"	Tom Cotter	Duncan Gould	Dean Gaffney guest stars	27 August 1992
Acting on information from a snout, DI Burnside mounts a raid on crack-houses. When details of the raid are leaked, DCI Meadows challenges Burnside over the trustworthiness of his team.
70	"Snap Shot"	Mike Dormer	Tony Etchells	Colin Wells guest stars	1 September 1992
A complaint over loud music quickly escalates into an armed siege, as a man waves a gun at PCs Stamp and Quinnan.
71	"Letting Go"	Chris Lovett	Joanne Maguire	Martin Marquez and Alan Westaway guest star	3 September 1992
Reg is playing with a train set before going out. He is looking for a place to live as he is moving out of the section house. Notes: Martin Marquez would join the cast, as the newly-promoted DS Danny Pearce, in 1993. Alan Westaway would join the cast as PC Nick Slater in 1995.
72	"Travelling Light"	Sheree Folkson	Rod Lewis	—	8 September 1992
Viv helps Donna dress up for a reconstruction of a murder case.
73	"Radio Waves"	Chris Lovett	Simon Moss	Stephen Lord and Joe Absolom guest stars	10 September 1992
After Stamp, Quinnan and Smollett pursue a stolen Escort XR3i in Sierra1, Monroe talks to Conway about a problem with a car chase.
74	"A Blind Eye"	Mike Dormer	Julian Jones	Russell Boulter, Adjoa Andoh and Eileen Way guest star	15 September 1992
Viv brings in an elderly mugging victim who helps make an identikit picture. Boyden gets spoken to by Monroe about working with the relief. Notes: Russell Boulter would join the cast as DC, later DS, John Boulton in 1994.
75	"Sympathy for the Devil"	Sheree Folkson	Edward Dumas	Harry Fowler and Vladek Sheybal guest star	17 September 1992
DI Burnside sets a trap for an armed robber at a building society, and is surprised to finds that the culprit is a man in his sixties.
76	"Force Is Part of the Service"	Anya Camilleri	J.C. Wilsher	David Harewood and Sally Faulkner guest star	22 September 1992
Brownlow and Conway have a meeting with councillors about the changes in the police force. Conway gives them a tour of the station.
77	"On the Record, Off the Record"	Anya Camilleri	David Hoksins	Alan Ford, Allan Corduner, Treva Etienne and Roy Heather guest star	24 September 1992
CID investigates a break-in at a warehouse which resulted in the theft of personal CD players.
78	"Stoning the Glasshouse"	David Attwood	Anthony Valentine	Anthony Daniels, Mark Arden and Stephen Moore guest star	29 September 1992
Cryer visits a friend who is the head of a neighbourhood watch. His son is stealing to support his drug habit.
79	"Tip-Off"	John Darnell	Sebastian Walker	Brian Capron guest stars	1 October 1992
Tosh is asked for by a burglar whom he put inside. He gives Tosh information that there might be a bank robbery.
80	"Open to Offers"	Roger Gartland	Russell Lewis	Tim McInnerny guest stars	6 October 1992
Monroe and the relief go to a pub where some men are damaging it. One of the men tries to blackmail Quinnan over some moonlighting.
81	"Playing God"	Roger Gartland	Margaret Phelan	Pat Nye guest stars	8 October 1992
CID are tied up with a court case. A burglary suspect of Roach's may have to be released as he is at court.
82	"Crack of Doom"	John Darnell	Gregory Evans	—	13 October 1992
There is a search of people looking for crack. A man has a scuffle with another man and claims a piece of crack was planted on him.
83	"Spit and Polish"	Frank W. Smith	Robert Jones	First appearance of WPC Polly Page; George Irving guest stars	15 October 1992
Loxton is late for shift. Just as Loxton is about to arrest a fine defaulter, Quinnan is nearly run over by a speeding Mercedes.
84	"Overdue"	Chris Lovett	J.C. Wilsher	Lloyd McGuire, Paul Ritter and Nicola Duffett guest star	20 October 1992
Burnside talks to a snout in a bus queue about a delivery. Woods and Carver observe the delivery and CID raid the premises.
85	"We Should Be Talking"	David Attwood	Duncan Gould	Hugo Speer guest stars	22 October 1992
Garfield is following a silver car that might have been involved in a ramraid. While checking in with the station, his radio goes dead.
86	"Reasonable Grounds"	Colm Villa	Julian Spilsbury	June Page and Larry Martyn guest star	27 October 1992
Datta goes to see a man about a missing child. Stringer has to tell a man his brother is dead.
87	"Discipline"	Colm Villa	Joanna Maguire	Gary Whelan guest stars	29 October 1992
An obbo on a club nearly goes wrong when a fight starts outside it. Notes: Gary Whelan, as the newly-promoted DI Harry Haines, would join the cast in 1993.
88	"Minefield"	Jean Stewart	Carolyn Sally Jones	Selina Cadell and Sam Kelly guest star	3 November 1992
Sgt Maitland finds himself in the wrong when he discovers a serious procedural error meant that a dangerous and possibly psychopathic man has been arrested twice for the same offence and released.
89	"Gamers"	Frank W. Smith	Jonathan Myerson	Gordon Warnecke guest stars	5 November 1992
Lines investigates a fire bombing of an Asian shop. Quinnan and Marshall investigate an Asian lady accused of shoplifting.
90	"Occupational Hazard"	Jean Stewart	Carolyn Sally Jones	First appearance of PC Gary McCann	10 November 1992
When sex appeal doesn't get him what he wants, Harry Osborne turns vicious. WDC Martella has to pick up the pieces.
91	"Just Send Some Flowers"	Chris Lovett	Michael Jenner	Adrian Lester and Liz Crowther guest star	12 November 1992
WDC Martella investigates a burglary that occurred during a funeral. A video commentary for this episode with writer Michael Jenner is available on The Bill Podcast
92	"Waifs and Strays"	Haldance Duncan	Jonathan Rich	Gavin Richards and Barbara Keogh guest star	17 November 1992
An old lady brings a blood-stained book belonging to a missing girl in to the station. DC Lines uncovers the family's dark secrets and comes up with an unexpected result.
93	"Happy Families"	Andrew Higgs	David Hoskins	Charlotte Coleman guest stars	19 November 1992
What's a smart girl like Sharon doing with a villain like Daniel Batt? DI Burnside thinks it's all to do with female hormones, but WDC Martella is not so sure.
94	"Well Out of Order"	Peter Smith	Steve Trafford	—	24 November 1992
Meadows and Burnside want to go in force to the Tankeray estate to root out the criminal element, but Brownlow is committed to a softer approach.
95	"Into the Mire"	Peter Smith	Steve Trafford	—	26 November 1992
CID receive information that leads to the arrest of a prolific handler of stolen goods.
96	"Master of the House"	Derek Lister	Christopher Russell	—	1 December 1992
The body of a respectable family man is found on a notorious patch of wasteland.
97	"Fireworks"	Nicholas Laughland	Duncan Gould	Neil Maskell and Jenny McCracken guest star	3 December 1992
Stamp uses some old-fashioned policing methods to tackle the problem of children playing with railway detonators.
98	"Cold Shoulder"	Haldane Duncam	Tony Etchells	—	8 December 1992
A local youth with form is stabbed in the centre of a densely populated housing development. DCI Meadows investigates when no witnesses come forward.
99	"Safety First"	Nicholas Laughland	Mick Duffy	—	10 December 1992
Following an armed robbery, DI Burnside confronts the problems caused by the widespread ownership of shotguns, and discovers just how easy it is for them to get into the wrong hands.
100	"Counting the Cost"	Laurence Moody	Anthony Valentine	Stanley Townsend guest stars	15 December 1992
A local hero who prevented a robbery, and was severely injured in the process, but received no compensation, is being harassed by a scrap dealer until WPC Ackland turns the tables with some harassment of her own.
101	"Compassion"	Chris Lovett	Frank Kippax	—	17 December 1992
A probation officer seems eager to assist DI Burnside over the murder of a prostitute, but how close is she to the murderer?
102	"Finders Keepers"	Derek Lister	Christopher Russell	Guest appearance of DC Mike Dashwood; Terence Bayler, Kate Williams and John Cater guest star	22 December 1992
DC Carver finds a buried treasure and the glory should be his. DC Dashwood, now with the Art and Antiques Squad, takes the case away and gets a result.
103	"Return Match"	Derek Lister	Christopher Russell	Guest appearance of DC Mike Dashwood	24 December 1992
When a collection of valuable dolls is stolen, DC Dashwood from the Art and Antiques Squad turns up, wrong-foots DC Lines and gets a result.
104	"High Places"	Jeremy Silberston	Peter J. Hammond	Anna Keaveney and Caroline John guest star	29 December 1992
An ex-criminal who used to be part of a circus high-wire act is found dead, apparently from a fall, but the pathologist says he died elsewhere.
105	"When Push Comes to Shove"	Matthew Evans	Tony Etchells	—	31 December 1992
Sun Hill officers are drinking after shift when some troublemakers arrive at the pub. WPC Ackland tries to calm the situation, but PCs Quinnan and Loxton decide that she needs their protection, and provoke a fight with a violent thug.
