= Out of Order (1987 film) =

1987 film directed by Jonnie Turpie

Out of Order is a 1987 British comedy-drama film directed by Jonnie Turpie and starring Gary Webster, Natasha Williams and George Baker. The screenplay concerns an unemployed layabout who shocks his family and friends by joining the police force.

== Cast ==
- Sharon Fryer ... Jaz Bailey
- Pete Lee-Wilson ... Billy Bannister
- Natasha Williams ... Veronica
- Cheryl Maiker ... Susan
- Gary Webster ... Anthony Campbell
- Timmy Lawrence ... Glynis
- Sandra Lawrence ... Sandra
- Dicken Ashworth ... Pool Player
- Buster Bloodvessel ... Jailer
- Annette Badland ... Operator
- George Baker ... Chief Inspector
- Peter Cellier ... Home Secretary
- Glynn Edwards ... Barman
- Roland Gift ... Customer
- Susan Hanson ... Anthony's Mum
- Don Henderson ... Car Driver
- Stephen Lewis ... Bus Driver
- Al Matthews ... U.S. DJ
- Garfield Morgan ... Drill Sergeant
- Tony Scoggo ... Man in Pub
- Ricky Tomlinson ... Decorator
- Frank Windsor ... Traffic Warden
- Peter Woods ... Newsreader
- David Yip ... Policeman
- Steven Hartley ... CID
- Tony Walsh ... CID
- Richard Ireson ... Teacher
- Robert McBain ... CO Armstrong
- Martin Gower ... PC Jones
- Laurence Harrington ... Inspector Proudlock
- Godfrey James ... Desk Sergeant
