= Come to Dust =

Studio album by Second Person
- Released: 2011
- Recorded: 2005–2011
- Genre: Post trip-hop
- Length: 58 minutes
- Label: Silence Corporation
- Producer: Mark Maclaine (The Silence)

Come to Dust is a post trip hop album by UK band Second Person.

This is the third and final album from the band, and their first full-length studio release since their debut Chromatography. It was produced by Mark Maclaine (a.k.a. The Silence) at The Silence Corporation Studios, London. Some of the songs on the album were mixed by the Tony Platt.

== Trivia ==
- Guests on the album include 2006 UK DMC Champion: DJ Muzzel, legendary Jazz trumpeter Jay Phelps, composer/cellist Nicholas Singer, amongst others.
- Directors for the album's videos include Ebba Erikzon, Mina Song, Everton Sebben, and Mark Maclaine.

== Track listing ==
1. "Gone Fishing" - 3:46
2. "The Alphabet Song" - 4:07
3. "Another Girlfriend" - 3:01
4. "Paper Umbrella" - 4:17
5. "Unretractable Facts" - 3:29
6. "Play Fair" - 3:29
7. "The Wishbone" - 3:59
8. "Story With Only Two Characters" - 1:38
9. "Spilt Milk" - 4:56
10. "Moth To A Candle Flame" - 2:51
11. "Four Leaf Clover" - 4:39
12. "Shadow Of A Doubt" - 2:33
13. "Giant Steps (Bonus Track)" - 4:27
