= Radian (comics) =

Radian, in comics, may refer to:

- Radian (Morituri), a Marvel Comics character from Strikeforce Morituri
- Radian, a Marvel Comics character from New X-Men
- Radian, a Marvel Comics character from Doom 2099

== See also ==
- Radian (disambiguation)
