= Natasha Williams (actress) =

British-based Jamaican actress (born 1971)

- Born: 18 July 1971 (age 54); Trelawny, Jamaica
- Occupation: Actress
- Years active: 1989–present

Natasha Williams (born Roselyn Agatha Williams; 18 July 1971) is a British-based Jamaican actress. She is known for playing the role of PC Delia French in the long running ITV drama The Bill.

Williams also played the role of a pharmacist in "Gridlock", an episode of Doctor Who that was broadcast on 14 April 2007, and appeared in Powers in 2004. Her film roles include City Rats (2009) and Silent Cry (2002). She starred in Out of Order (1987), as well as television movies such as Esther where she had the role of Maimuna, the faithful servant of Queen Esther who Louise Lombard played. Other film roles include The Murder of Stephen Lawrence (1999) and the political satire Giving Tongue (1996). She also played Mara in the 2002 documentary Ice World. On stage, Williams played the role of Del Matthews in the debut production of Leave Taking at the Liverpool Playhouse in 1987.
