= Radian (disambiguation) =

Radian may refer to:

- Radian, a unit of plane angle
- Radian (band), a musical group
- Radian (EP), an EP by Ana Free
- Radian (comics), a number of comics characters
- Radian Group, a credit enhancement company
- Radian Glacier, Antarctica
- Radian Ridge, Antarctica, see Radian Glacier
- Yamaha YX600 Radian, a motorbike

== See also ==
- Steradian
- Gradian
