= Ana Free =

Portuguese singer-songwriter (born 1987)

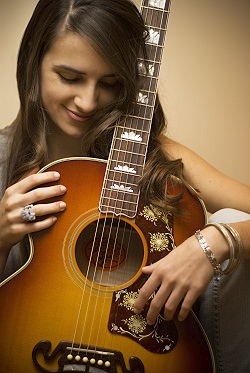

Background information
- Born: Ana Gomes Ferreira; 29 June 1987 (age 39)
- Origin: Cascais, Portugal
- Genres: Pop, rock
- Occupations: Singer; musician; songwriter; performer
- Years active: 2007–present
- Label: Unsigned
- Website: anafree.com

Ana Gomes Ferreira (born 29 June 1987), known professionally as Ana Free, is a singer, musician, songwriter and performer who has had a series of top-five hit singles, including 4 number one hits, in Portugal. She has a growing musical presence on the popular video sharing website YouTube, gaining over 40.1 million views to date. Ana Free's single "Electrical Storm" from her debut album, Together, occupied the number 1 spot on the MTV Portugal Top 50 National Music Chart.

== Early life ==
Born to a British mother and Portuguese father, Free grew up with her older brother in Cascais. At a young age she was passionate about writing poetry and stories, and began writing and composing at the age of 10. Since then, she has been able to play the guitar fluently for over 15 years, and has amassed well over 500 original compositions. During her childhood, she went to St.Julians International School in Carcavelos, where she picked up her distinctive accent.

== Personal life ==
She is currently recording and living in Los Angeles and recently finished a degree with First Class Honours in economics at the University of Kent in 2008. Ana developed a particular fondness for subjects like international trade and game theory and went on to write a dissertation titled What is the Impact of Technology on the Structure of the Major Record Labels (between 1995 and 2005)? for which she received a Distinction. As well as being fluent in both English and Portuguese, Ana also speaks Spanish, French and Greek.

== Influences ==
Free claims to have been very musically influenced by the records her father used to play to her as a child. She says she grew up listening to artists such as Eric Clapton, Bob Dylan, The Beatles, Bob Marley, Santana, Sam Cooke, Joni Mitchell and Sheryl Crow. She learned to play a lot of blues songs on guitar, which she practised with her father. She says that as a teenager she used to borrow her brother's records and listened to artists like Bryan Adams, Guns N' Roses, Bon Jovi, Aerosmith and 4 Non Blondes. She was also a fan of mainstream pop acts like Christina Aguilera, En Vogue, Britney Spears, Destiny's Child, Spice Girls, and Ace of Base. Among these, she listens to artists like Pink, John Mayer, Rihanna, Jason Mraz, Pixie Lott, Katy Perry, Ellie Goulding and Linkin Park, as well as having strong influences from Portuguese, Greek, Spanish and French music.

== Career ==
In 2013, Ana Free was invited to be the musical ambassador for the Volkswagen brand in their digital campaign "As Sun As Possible" to promote the new Volkswagen Beetle cabriolet, filmed in Hawaii. Ana also released her debut album, TOGETHER, in January 2013.

After completing the Volkswagen campaign, Ana Free moved to Los Angeles where she is currently based. In late 2013 Ana Free was asked to be one of the official songwriters and composers for the US drama series SAF3 for the opening season of the show, airing on the CW channel. Ana was announced as one of the 10 finalists of the 2013 Guitar Center Singer Songwriter Competition selected by Grammy-winning record producer Don Was.

In 2012, Ana Free launched a crowd funding campaign via the popular website PledgeMusic which lasted 8 months. She went on to complete her debut album alongside Argentinian producer Rodrigo Crespo, who has worked with an array of artists including Shakira, recording the album in Buenos Aires, London and Lisbon. A recent interview with Billboard Magazine mentioned Ana was scheduled to release her debut album later in 2012. In May 2012, Ana showcased her album at the first officially YouTube endorsed festival in Singapore, her first ever visit to Asia, sponsored by Warner Singapore, Blackberry and telecoms company Starhub. Performing alongside David Choi, Tiffany Alvord, Jason Chen and Joseph Vincent, Ana debuted the first single "Electrical Storm" off her upcoming debut album on The MTV Show. In December 2012 she released her debut album "TOGETHER" (also known as "TO.GET.HER") on Warner Singapore and it was welcomed onto the music scene with very strong 4/5 star reviews, dubbing the debut album as "written beautifully" and "emotional". On 2 June 2012, Ana performed at the prestigious Rock in Rio festival in Lisbon.

In late 2011, Ana teamed up with MTV EMA nominee DJ Diego Miranda and together they recorded the hit single "Girlfriend" which went on to hold the number 1 spot on the national charts for over 8 weeks. The videoclip has over 1.5 million views.

In August 2011 it was revealed that Ana had won the Music Crowns pop category with her track 'In My Place' as judged by Samantha Mumba, Liam Bailey, Ahmir, Su-Elise Nash and ultimately the UK and Ireland general public.

In May 2010, Free travelled to New York City to work with British film director, music producer and writer Mark Maclaine, for the filming of the videoclip for Questions in My Mind, her first single off the five-track EP Radian, released in February 2010. She also travelled to Portugal to record the videoclip with Portuguese rock band Hands on Approach, for whom she recorded vocals on the song Black Tears, for their album High and Above.

In the autumn of 2009, Free recorded her five-track acoustic/pop EP Radian in London which went into physical distribution in FNAC stores in Portugal the following year. In February and March 2010 she debuted the record in Miami and New York City. She was also featured prominently on a billboard in Times Square. The album has an acoustic/pop theme and is a selection of 5 of Ana's most popular original-content YouTube videos.

In November 2008, Free was invited to record the Portuguese theme tune Voa Até Ao Teu Coração for the release of the Disney movie Tinker Bell for which she also recorded the music video.

She made her first live TV performance in the summer of 2007 on TVI in Portugal, where she sang "Crazy", a song she composed herself. Ana has achieved chart success with her first single, which was released on 23 May 2008, "In My Place". The popularity of her song made it feature in various Portuguese series including Morangos com Açúcar and Podia Acabar o Mundo.

Ana frequently tours in Portugal, London and New York, and her gigs are recorded by her friends and uploaded to her blogs and websites. She opened for British singer/songwriter James Morrison in the summer of 2010. In November 2010, she opened for Shakira, which Ana considers one of her career's most defining and special moments. Some of her most popular songs, with over a million views each, include covers of Nickelback's "Savin' Me", The Rolling Stones hit "Angie", and Shakira's 2010 World Cup theme "Waka Waka".

== Charity ==
Ana has contributed to a variety of charitable causes, including lending her name to the Liga Portuguesa contra o Cancro (LPCC) in 2009, as an ambassador for raising awareness for cervical cancer. She is also the current ambassador to the Lisbon Oceanarium. In 2010, the Make A Wish Foundation worked with Ana to fulfil the wishes of a young teenage fan suffering from cystic fibrosis, by inviting her and her family to spend 5 days in London, where she accompanied Ana to studio, the London Eye, and attended her popular show at The Barfly.

== Discography ==
=== Albums ===
- TOGETHER (alt. name: TO.GET.HER) (2013)
1. "Perfection"
2. "Electrical Storm"
3. "Rewind"
4. "Renegade"
5. "I Want Your Love"
6. "Sugar Rush"
7. "Wake Up Call"
8. "No Other Way"
9. "Surrender"
10. "Beautiful Goodbye"

=== EPs ===
- Radian (2010)
1. "Questions In My Mind"
2. "Chained"
3. "Try"
4. "Playgrounds And Kisses"
5. "Child"

=== Singles ===
Singles	Year	Portuguese Chart
No Other Way (from debut album "TOGETHER")	2013	1
Electrical Storm (from debut album "TOGETHER")	2012	1
Girlfriend	2012	1
Playgrounds and Kisses	2010	1
Questions in My Mind	2010	4
Self Inflicted	2009	2
Keep on Walking	2009	2
In My Place	2008	1

=== Official Music Videos ===
1. "No Other Way"
2. "Electrical Storm"
3. "Girlfriend"
4. "Black Tears"
5. "Playgrounds And Kisses"
6. "Questions in My Mind"
7. "Keep on Walking"
8. "Voa Até O Teu Coração for "Sininho" (Tinkerbell Movie for Portugal)"
