= Robert Perkins (actor) =

Welsh actor and director (born 1966)

- Occupations: Actor; Theatre director Film producer
- Years active: 1993–present
- Website: www.robertperkinsvoice.com

Robert Perkins is a British actor, theatre director, television director and film director.

== Career ==
Perkins began his career in 1993 playing Sgt. Ray Steele in The Bill, appearing in this Thames Television drama until 1996. Since then he has appeared in numerous programmes including Casualty, Holby City, Rosemary and Thyme, Midsomer Murders and Powers. In 1999 Perkins appeared in Guiding Star at the Royal National Theatre, London. In 2000 he made his first appearance at Theatr Clwyd, playing Victor in Private Lives. His association with Theatr Clwyd lasted ten years, concluding with his one-man adaptation of Charles Dickens's A Christmas Carol in 2009–10, which was well reviewed in The Stage.

Perkins's film debut was in 2001, when he appeared in the short film Close Encounter, made by Albion Films and directed by Eugene Grobler. In 2005 he appeared in the American romantic comedy drama The Upside of Anger along with Kevin Costner.

Perkins provided the voice of Sledgehammer in the video game, Clock Tower 3.

In 2006 Perkins set up Carpe Momento Ltd as a vehicle for his stage productions. The first of these productions was A Christmas Carol, staged at Hampton Court Palace and Theatr Clwyd. In 2008 his association with Private Lives continued with his producing and directing the play at Hampton Court Palace and Kensington Palace. In 2010 Perkins produced and directed a short film, The Waiting Room, starring Flora Montgomery and Dominic Mafham. The film, based on a novel of the same name by F. G. Cottam, was made as a curtain-raiser for a full-length film with the same name.
