= Radian (EP) =

EP by Ana Free
- Released: February 9, 2010
- Recorded: 2009–2010
- Genre: Acoustic, soft rock
- Length: 17:11
- Language: English
- Label: Ana Free
- Producer: Blake Brandes

Singles from Radian
- 1. "Questions in My Mind" Released: February 17, 2010

Radian is the debut EP album by Portuguese singer Ana Free. It was released on February 9, 2010, in the U.S. and its lead single was "Questions in My Mind", released a week after.

== Writing and composition ==
The EP contains five songs, several of which are Ana Free's most popular original songs on YouTube. Ana Free wrote the songs, which were then arranged and recorded by her producer.

== Recording and production ==
Ana Free recorded her songs with producer Blake Brandes of Decrypt Productions in London.

== Release and promotion ==
The EP has been physically and digitally released in the U.S. on February 9, 2010. To promote the album, Ana Free performed launch concerts in New York and Miami, with upcoming concerts scheduled in Portugal and the UK.

== Reception ==
Professional ratings
Review scores
Source	Rating
CDBaby	5/5 stars
Universe	4/5 stars

Simon Maher from CDBaby gave the album a rating of 5 out of 5 stars and commented: "The professional recording debut EP of an aspiring Portuguese music artist, Ana Free, is a pleasant surprise. Ana Free's EP is an extremely impressive debut and it leaves you eagerly awaiting the release of her forthcoming album. This 5 track EP clocks in at a little over seventeen minutes. As the old saying goes, always take quality over quantity. These 5 tracks definitely have the quality. Judging by her debut, Ana Free is definitely one I expect to hear a lot more from in the near future". R. Freitas from Universe gave the album a rating of 4 out of 5 stars saying: "Some songs like "Questions In My Mind" or "Chained", show a mild calm and serene sounding, with well-structured complex original lyrics, as well as the other new songs. this album is a great original".

== Singles ==
- "Questions in My Mind" has been released as the lead single of the album on February 17, 2010. A music video has been produced for it.

== Track listing ==
No.	Title	Writer(s)	Length
1.	"Questions in My Mind"	Ana Free	3:51
2.	"Chained"	Ana Free	3:38
3.	"Try"	Ana Free	3:12
4.	"Playgrounds and Kisses"	Ana Free	2:59
5.	"Child"	Ana Free	3:31
Total length:			17:11

== Release history ==
Region	Date	Label	Format
U.S.	February 9, 2010	Ana Free	CD; Digital download
Europe		Ana Free	CD; Digital download
Portugal		Ana Free	CD; Digital download

== Charts ==
Chart (2010)	Peak position
Portuguese Albums Chart	2
