= Powers (British TV series) =

- Genre: Science fiction
- Created by: Jim Eldridge
- Written by: Jim Eldridge; Stephen Hallett; Christopher Wicking; Carolyn Sally-Jones; John Jackson
- Directed by: Emma Bodger; Brian Farnham
- Starring: Rupert Holliday-Evans; Mandana Jones; Adam Jessop; Amy Yamazaki
- Country of origin: United Kingdom
- Original language: English
- No. of seasons: 1
- No. of episodes: 13

Production
- Executive producer: Jesse Cleverly
- Producer: Chris Le Grys
- Cinematography: Shelley Hirst
- Editor: Nigel Parkes
- Running time: 30 minutes
- Production company: BBC Children's

Original release
- Network: BBC One
- Release: 7 January – 31 March 2004

Powers is a British science fiction television series first broadcast in 2004 on BBC One. Produced by Chris Le Grys and directed by Emma Bodger and Brian Farnham for BBC Children's, the series was created by Jim Eldridge, who wrote episodes alongside co-writers Stephen Hallett, Christopher Wicking, Carolyn Sally-Jones, and John Jackson.

Centring around two teens with telepathic, telekinetic, and extrasensory psychic powers, Powers was promoted as a children's version of The X-Files, although many regarded it as a successor to The Tomorrow People. It ran for one 13-episode season, and was also broadcast in Australia. Powers has never been commercially released.

== Overview ==
The series follows the adventures of The Powers Project, a group of researchers led by Professor Henry Powers (portrayed by Rupert Holliday-Evans), who investigate mysteries concerned with the paranormal. The other members of the project are Mark Roberts (Adam Jessop) and Song-Li Harris (Amy Yamazaki), two teenagers with psychic abilities, and Dr Mary Holland (Mandana Jones), who used to have special powers in her own teen years but no longer does.

Mark and Song-Li's powers differ; Mark is telepathic and can move objects with his mind, whereas Song-Li is capable of extrasensory perception in emotions and memories associated with objects. She joins the project during the first episode of the series after the discovery of her powers, and goes on to be involved in most investigations with Mark.

== Production and broadcast ==
Powers spent six years in development. During this time it was reported that Disney were interested in a possible co-production deal, following the success of their previous award-winning collaboration with BBC Children's on Microsoap, but this was abandoned. The series was produced by Chris Le Grys, and episodes were directed by Emma Bodger and Brian Farnham; the three had previously worked on the ITV series Night and Day.

Special effects and computer-generated imagery were created by Darkside Animation using LightWave 3D software. This consisted of 170 shots which were filmed between July and November 2003. Notable amongst these were the title sequence and end credits, and a UFO in episode 4, "We Are Not Alone". Some were initially dropped early on in production due to time and budget constraints, but nonetheless still made later on.

The series was originally due to be broadcast by the BBC in autumn 2004, but was moved forward to instead begin on 7 January 2004. Powers was also shown by the ABC in Australia throughout the 2000s.

== Cast and characters ==
- Adam Jessop as Mark Roberts
- Amy Yamazaki as Song-Li Harris
- Mandana Jones as Dr Mary Holland
- Rupert Holliday-Evans as Professor Henry Powers
- Michelle Lee as Mrs Harris
- Guy Scantlebury as Mr Harris
- Dominic Rickards as Mr Edgar
- Gareth Hunt as Tom Watkins
- Heather Bleasdale as Janey Watkins
- Philip Wright as David Watkins
- Dominic Barklem as Brian Watkins
- Jessica Fox as Lex
- Ed Browning as Evan Foster
- Victoria Willing as Mrs Foster
- Jon Croft as Harry Ford
- Janine Wood as Nina
- Lucy Robinson as Cora Hamilton
- Mary Roscoe as Aunt Kate
- Katie Sheridan as Sam Ryan
- Kieron Forsyth as Frank Morris
- Fiona Gillies as Mel
- Dean Cook as Dean
- Sean Francis as Paul Walsh
- Florence Bell as Toni
- Clare Wille as WPC Robbins
- Robert Perkins as Neil Goodson
- Maggie Hayes as Moira Goodson
- Sean Baker as Professor Dixon
- William Tapley as Future Mark
- Naoko Mori as Future Song-Li
- Michael Obiora as Tyrone Lewis
- David Daker as Mike Knowles
- Natasha Williams as Mrs Lewis

== Episodes ==
No.	Title	Directed by	Written by	Notable guest appearances	Original release date
1	"New Kid in Town"	Emma Bodger	Jim Eldridge	N/A	7 January 2004
The Powers Project is asked to look into the strange events taking place at a country hotel A teenage girl named Song-Li Harris is claiming that a ghost has been damaging her room, while her parents and the manager are rather more sceptical. Upon arrival the team see some evidence of poltergeist activity. It transpires that Song-Li's powers are responsible for the supernatural activity, and she agrees to join the project, much to Mark's annoyance.
2	"Missing"	Emma Bodger	Jim Eldridge	Gareth Hunt; Heather Bleasdale	14 January 2004
25 years after his father was almost killed in a quarrying accident, David Watkins drives into a quarry and disappears. His son contacts the Powers Project after reading about their work online. Mark is unable to help, but he suggests that Song Li may have more success. Her powers finally lead them to the quarry where she finds the detonating box that David had fallen on twenty-five years earlier. She has a vision of the accident and sees that David's father was pushed out of the way of the explosion by another man. This man was David himself, who had inadvertently travelled back in time. David's family and the project members set up another explosion at the same location and time of day, and David returns to the present.
3	"Shade in the Stone"	Emma Bodger	Jim Eldridge	Victoria Willing	21 January 2004
Evan Foster and Harry Ford dig up an ancient silver chalice on Harry's farmland. Unknown to Harry, Evan also finds an inscribed amulet. The Powers Project are called in when Evan starts visiting the local museum at every available opportunity after the chalice goes on display. CCTV footage shows Evan standing outside the museum along with the shadow of someone else. According to the curator of the museum the chalice is almost certainly a 10th-century Anglo Saxon burial chalice. When Harry disappears the team realise that someone, or something, is trying to bring the objects back together. The amulet has taken over Evan, and the team discover that he intends to bury the artefacts together with some bones which Harry had secretly kept. Mark and Song-Li find Harry and the bones and are able to reunite them with the artefacts, releasing Evan in the process.
4	"We Are Not Alone"	Brian Farnham	Jim Eldridge	Jessica Fox	28 January 2004
The Powers Project are called in to try to communicate with a girl who has been caught outside a secret research establishment. The other people with her at the time managed to get away. Neither Mark nor Song Li manage to get anything from the girl, but Mark finds out from Dr Felton that she may be an alien. Mark and Song Li communicate with her again with no one else in the room and find out that her name is Lex. She was on a research trip when their ship developed a fault, and landed to re-fuel it with water. Felton is listening to their conversation via a bug planted in her cell, but Mark and Song Li are able to help Lex to escape by returning her to her spaceship - leaving no proof that Lex was an alien at all.
5	"Land of Nod"	Emma Bodger	Stephen Hallett	Janine Wood	4 February 2004
A girl called Erin has a recurring dream in which she repeatedly sees an old couple named William and Angie, and The Powers Project are called to investigate. Song Li uses her powers to share Erin's dream. It appears that William believes that he is dreaming about the daughter who he and Angie put up for adoption 40 years earlier. Song-Li tries to identify the house which William and Angie live in, and with the information she gives Mark and Professor Powers are able to find the house. Song-Li finds a photograph of the couple's daughter, and asks Erin's mother when her birthday is. It is the same as the date of the photo, and Erin's mother reveals that she was adopted: she is William and Angie's daughter.
6	"Things That Go Bump"	Emma Bodger	Christopher Wicking	Lucy Robinson; Mary Roscoe	11 February 2004
The Powers team are asked to look into what appears to be vandalism at a children's home following the disappearance of a teenage girl. When Mark and Professor Powers visit the home, the balls from the pool table start flying around the room, but Powers suspects that this may be Mark's reaction to missing his parents. The Professor tries to track down the aunt of a former resident of the home who is thought to be behind the incidents, while Mary and Song Li spend a night at the home. Soon after their arrival they witness more unusual event, such as lids flying off saucepans. Later that night the home comes under attack once more. Two of the children at the home, Karl and Julia, who have powers of their own, are found to be behind the incidents.
7	"Is There Anybody Out There?"	Brian Farnham	Stephen Hallett	Katie Sheridan; Kieron Forsyth	18 February 2004
The Powers team investigate the strange disappearance of guest house owner Ned Thomson who has been captured on video apparently being abducted by aliens. Everybody in the area saw strange lights in the sky on the day he disappeared except for the Cargills, a family staying in one of Thomson's cottages. Mark and Song-Li both pick up interference in their telepathic abilities, and believe this to be a result of the ley lines which meet at the point at which Ned disappeared. They then discover that Ned wasn't abducted by aliens; it was a hoax to get more guests to visit Ned's farm. However, the Cargills are in fact aliens, who escape in a UFO.
8	"I'll Be Watching You"	Brian Farnham	Carolyn Sally Jones	Fiona Gillies; Dean Cook	25 February 2004
Mark and Professor Powers are asked to talk to a boy called Ian, who his aunt Mel believes is being bullied. Ian suffers from vertigo and is dared to walk along a wall. Initially he stumbles, but a light appears at the end of the wall and he calmly walks along it. Mark finds out from Ian that he believes someone is looking after him. He also picks up a strange photo that Ian has dropped, which Mary identifies as an aura photo. Song Li picks up an image of Ian and Mel being involved in a car accident, and senses that another presence was also there. Mel tells them that a lorry was about to hit them, but before she saw it a voice told her to pull over. Ian believes he has a guardian angel, and Mary finds out that this usually vanishes after three days. Three days after the accident, Ian is dared to walk along the scaffolding in an old church, and Mark is forced to help him.
9	"The Uninvited"	Emma Bodger	Carolyn Sally Jones	Sean Francis	3 March 2004
Ben, the son of one of Mary's friends, has been looking for their dog which has run away, and is now telling stories about returning home and finding his father missing and an unknown family living in their house. Professor Powers comes up with the theory that they may be dealing with a parallel universe linked to ours via a wormhole. Because the dog has moved between the two universes, they start to become unstable. Mark and Ben travel into the parallel universe to retrieve the dog and return the universes to normal.
10	"Face Value"	Emma Bodger	Jim Eldridge	Clare Wille	10 March 2004
A car crashes and a teenage girl, Toni, climbs out uninjured, leaving a man and woman unconscious. She goes into an electrical shop, and the pictures on the televisions change to show the crashed car. At the local police station, she opens a locked police car which has the keys inside without setting off the alarm. The police contact the Powers Project for help. The woman who was in the car is interviewed by a doctor who needs to know if Toni caused the crash as they don't know what she is capable of. The professor tests Toni on a reaction test where the user has to use their powers to predict which areas in a computer game will become active. She scores 100% to break every record, but Song Li cannot pick up any emotion from her. Toni turns out to be a robot who has become unstable, and is deactivated.
11	"In the Loop"	Brian Farnham	Carolyn Sally Jones	Robert Perkins; Maggie Hayes	17 March 2004
Mark and Dr Holland go to investigate an area where aircraft have reported instrumentation problems. Initially suspecting it to be caused by ley lines, they and everyone else on the farm are sent back in time to their arrival when the farm's owner digs up a stone. Only Mark and the farmer's daughter Becky notice this. The time taken for the loop to complete shortens every time, leading Professor Powers to wonder if time will catch up with itself and stop altogether. After travelling round the loop a number of times, Mark and Becky are able to prevent the farm owner from moving the stone, setting time back on track.
12	"Future Box"	Brian Farnham	Jim Eldridge	Naoko Mori	24 March 2004
Professor Dixon brings a device called a Future Box, which should enable the user to get a glimpse of his or her future, to the project. Mark is eager to find out if he will be rich and famous and is the first to try the machine. Ignoring Dixon's warning, he interacts with his future self who has become rich by selling arms, and becomes stuck in the future. Song-Li goes into the future to rescue Mark, but also becomes stuck when she interacts with her future self - the future Mark's secretary, who is secretly planning to kill him. Mark and Song-Li are able to return to the present by destroying the futures they had accidentally created.
13	"The Future is Yours"	Brian Farnham	John Jackson	Michael Obiora; David Daker; Natasha Williams	31 March 2004
As a birthday surprise Mark is taken to see the FA Cup, which is currently on display at Stanford Rovers FC. Mark takes a penalty on the pitch, which is saved by a young player called Tyrone Lewis who caught the ball without looking as if he knew where it was going be. It soon emerges that Tyrone didn't just see where the ball was going; he's also had a vision of the FA Cup being stolen from its display case while Mark and Song Li are present. When the cup is stolen, Mark and Song-Li have to prove their innocence and find out who is responsible. This turns out to be the team's manager, Mike Knowles, who intended to make money for the team by claiming a reward from the FA for its return. After the cup is returned Tyrone agrees to join the project.

== Critical response and legacy ==
Powers generally received positive responses from viewers. The series was most frequently praised as a successor to The Tomorrow People, though some such as Action TV's Kieran Seymour perceived there to be considerable variation between episodes by different writers. Writing for the BFI in the BFI Television Handbook 2005, Doctor Who Magazine contributor and television journalist Alistair McGown commended Powers' "dramatic conviction" for carrying its range of plots well, and favourably compared the series' "slick production style" to "the eccentric Home counties milieu" of The Avengers, noting hopes for it to continue.

According to Simon Percy, co-founder of the series' special effects producers Darkside Animation, its ratings were described as "excellent" by the BBC. However, a second series never materialised. No official reason was ever given for Powers' non-renewal; this and the mirrored fate of similar ITV series Life Force was lamented by McGown in a retrospective on British children's fantasy and science fiction television for the Screenonline project, stating that the BBC had cancelled it after "one excellent run". Though also never commercially released, the series was repeated a number of times on the digital CBBC Channel during the 2000s.
