= Extreme Sports Channel =

European pay television channel

- Country: United Kingdom
- Broadcast area: Worldwide

Programming
- Language: English
- Picture format: 1080i HDTV (downscaled to 16:9 576i for the SDTV feed)

Ownership
- Owner: Extreme International (brand); AMC Networks International (channel)

History
- Launched: 1 May 1999; 27 years ago

Links
- Website: Extreme.com extremeinternational.com

The Extreme Sports Channel is a pay television channel that was launched from Amsterdam on 1 May 1999. The channel broadcasts in over 60 countries and 12 languages, and covers extreme sport and adventure sports which include surfing, skateboarding, snowboarding, wakeboarding, motocross, BMX, mountain biking, FMX, music, gaming and fashion.

== History ==
Alistair Gosling from Essex in the UK founder of Extreme International a sports media and marketing company and a passionate free skier, free diver, sailor and pilot and came up with the idea for the Network in 1996. In 1997 Alistair, Ben Barret, Juanjo Marquez and Adam Oliver who were all working for Extreme started approaching potential investors to back the plan for a new brand and TV network dedicated to extreme and adventure sports. UPCtv, the programming arm of Europe's largest cable television operator UPC, was looking for new channels to offer its subscribers and in April 1998 Extreme international was exhibiting at the MIP programming market in Cannes, France, Ben Barrett the sales director was approached by Stephen Cohen, UPCtv's Chief Operating Officer who had heard about the channel, with a proposal for a joint venture between the two companies. Extreme partnered with UPC, raised $35 million and The Extreme Sports Channel was launched from the Netherlands on 1 May 1999, after launching in 22 other countries it launched in the UK in 2000. The channel was designed by Gosling and Cohen, management, commercialization and content was produced, curated and delivered by Extreme International and technical play out and uplink were supplied by UPC.

In late 1999, Extreme launched its United States operations, and charged veteran producer, Lloyd Bryan Adams with the task of heading up the North American presence. They launched Extreme TV, a branded block on Fox Sports Net in March 2012.

In 2005, after launching the channel in over sixty countries and seeing the growth in social media and sports, Extreme International acquired sole ownership of the "Extreme" brand and IP and sold its 50% stake in Extreme Sports Channel to John Malone's Liberty Global Inc. which had by then become owner of UPC. The channel was put under the management of Chellomedia.

Following the transaction, the company re focused its business model away from traditional television to focus on sports focused social media publishing, sports marketing, athlete and influencer management, IP and Format development, live events and Red Bull Style social stunts.

=== Operations and Agency Services ===
Today Extreme operates a sports marketing, media and entertainment group specialising in action sports, health and fitness, automotive and adventure travel. It combines creator and athlete marketing, social media publishing, talent representation, IP and format development, social first video production and live events.

It is part of the operational holding company Wavelength.now and is being built through organic growth and a roll up that is bringing complementary businesses together into group. Its operations are divided into these areas:

- Social Media Channels: Extreme operates and commercialises an owned network of action sports and automotive social media channels with 20 million followers delivering 200 million video views a month across Instagram, TikTok and Facebook.
- Talent Representation and Development : Extreme works with athletes, influencers, events and creators to facilitate and activate brand partnerships, off platform commercialisation and develop formats and IP. Creators it represents includes Supercar Blondie, the worlds largest automotive content creator. Combined all of its talent has an audience of 300+ million followers and delivers a reach of 950+ million views per month across Instagram, YouTube, Tiktok, Snapchat and Facebook.
- IP and Format Development : Developing, scaling and commercialising IP & formats with creators, athletes, brands and creative partners across media, events and destinations.
- Studio and Production: Human-led, AI-powered content production developing, packaging and producing original formats, series, documentaries and branded entertainment in partnership with talent, distributed across broadcast, social and streaming platforms.
- Live Event Production, Representation and commercialisation : Development, delivery and commercial representation of live events, sports leagues and Red Bull style social stunts. Extreme has also developed and runs a large scale environmental initiative at the annual COP events called the "Extreme Hangout".

Clients and delivery Extreme has delivered marketing campaigns for corporate clients and regional tourism organisations, involving influencer marketing, event activations and social media production and distribution. Organisations it has worked with include Red Bull, Google, Stanley Black & Decker, TripAdvisor, Swatch, Clarks, Knoops, ITV, the Public Investment Fund (PIF) and the World Wide Fund for Nature (WWF). Tourism-related projects have included Visit Malta, Egypt Tourism and Qiddiya

Hotels and resorts. In the hospitality sector, Extreme has partnered with a team specialising in hotel and resort development to establish Extreme Hotels & Resorts. The initiative focuses on hotels and resorts that cater to guests interested in adventure sports, health and fitness. The company works with property owners, developers, investors and tourism organisations interested in developing properties under the Extreme Hotels & Resorts brand.

With a passion for the outdoors and the environment Extreme has activated a number of sustainably initiatives, it aligns with the five key United Nations Sustainable Development Goals and government agendas and in 2020 launched the Extreme Hangout at COP 26 Glasgow an events impact platform that has been running at COP conference for 5 years, It has welcomed and engage with over 50,000 attendees since launch. It is also signed up to Planet Mark to measure impact, 1% For The Planet and the UN’s Sports for Climate Action to drive awareness.

=== Expansion ===
The channel launched in Poland in January 2006, followed by France in that same year.

The UK version of the channel was free-to-air from launch until the summer of 2006, when a deal with BSkyB meant that it became encrypted.

On 28 September 2011 the channel began broadcasting in widescreen (16:9) format.

On 1 February 2012 the high-definition version of the channel began broadcasting in Italy.

AMC Networks acquired Chellomedia on 2 February 2014. Chellomedia was rebranded by AMC Networks International on 8 July 2014.

On 31 December 2015, the channel was removed from the Sky EPG.

As of 27 October 2021 Extreme became available on Channelbox via Freeview channel 271 in the UK. Channelbox is a free IPTV service available to any Freeview compatible device that can connect to both an aerial and internet.

In June 2024, the company acquired their own streaming slot on Freeview under the name Extreme Channel on channel 295.

As of February 2025 Extreme decided to give up its separate slot on Freeview in favour of Channelbox and focusing on their Extreme Plus streaming application

== Programmes ==
- Beyond the Beaten Path with the Eagar Brothers
- Boondock Nation
- Dirty South Bounders
- Epic Trails with Eric Hanson
- Facing Waves
- Fantasy Factory with skateboarder Rob Dyrdek
- Fighting Fit
- The Travel Geek with Cyle O’Donnell
- The Ultimate Ride
