= Laurence Harrington =

British actor (born 1938)

- Born: 30 September 1938 (age 87)
- Occupation: Actor

Laurence Harrington (born 30 September 1938) is a British actor who has played DS Probert in Z-Cars, Lunar Guard in Doctor Who, George Latimer in Softly, Softly, the Lawyer in The Sweeney, Jackson in Space: 1999, Gary in Agony, Jeff Sadler in Boon, Ricky Price and Cyril Harrington-Morse in two separate episodes on Lovejoy, Vic Lawson in Love Hurts and James Palfrey in Dalziel and Pascoe. He has also guest-starred in Agatha Christie's Poirot, The Bill, Casualty, Holby City and Doctors, and appeared in films such as The Boys in Blue (1982), Don't Open till Christmas (1984), Car Trouble (1986), Out of Order (1987) and Afraid of the Dark (1991). Harrington also appeared in the British band Naked Eyes' 1984 music Video "(What) In the Name of Love". He also starred in Upstairs Downstairs as Chief Petty Officer Webb in an episode called Facing Fearful Odds.

== Filmography ==
Year	Title	Role	Notes
1970	Julius Caesar	Carpenter	
1982	The Boys in Blue	Police Radio Operator	
1984	Don't Open till Christmas	Kate's Father	
1986	Car Trouble	Mr. Standish	
1987	Out of Order	Inspector Proudlock	
1991	Afraid of the Dark	Neighbor	
1999	Julie and the Cadillacs	Mr. Jockle	(final film role)
