= Chromatography (album) =

Studio album by Second Person
- Released: 30 October 2004
- Recorded: 2002–2004
- Genre: Post trip-hop
- Length: 52:46
- Label: Independent
- Producer: Mark Maclaine (The Silence)

Chromatography is a 2004 post trip-hop album by Second Person.

This is the band's debut album and all songs were written by Julia Johnson and Mark Maclaine, except "Word for Word" which also credits Ed Webber and Tristan Kajanus, "Demons Die" which also credits Álvaro López and "Divine" which was written by Julia Johnson. The album was recorded, produced and mixed by Mark Maclaine (aka The Silence) at The Silence Corporation Studios, London. The songs "I Spy" and "My Baby Only Cares For Me" were originally written for the 2003 ski/snowboard film: Snow's in the House 2 and they can be found as earlier incarnations on the film's soundtrack.

== Track listing ==
1. "Too Cold To Snow" – 4:42
2. "Demons In The Scenery" – 3:48
3. "No Window" – 4:21
4. "I Spy" – 4:12
5. "Wreckage" – 3:16
6. "Demons Die" – 3:30
7. "Word For Word" – 3:43
8. "Nerve" – 4:07
9. "My Baby Only Cares For Me" – 3:30
10. "Senseless Sentences" – 4:20
11. "Divine" – 4:09
12. "Lucky Breaks" – 4:08
13. "Grace" – 5:02
14. "Harry: Walkies" - 0:09
