= Dolls (2006 film) =

- Release date: 2006
- Country: United Kingdom
- Language: English

Mouche and Carrot Top from "Dolls"

Dolls is a British short film written and directed by Susan Luciani, narrated by Charles Dance and starring Joanna Lumley and Denis Lawson. Broadcast on BBC and Sky TV, the film was officially selected to play in International film festivals Spain, Italy, France, Cyprus, Africa and Japan and the United States. It was also shown at Roguerunner Screenings and at the 2006 Cannes Film Festival and was selected to feature as part of the British Society of Cinematographers' New Film Maker Night at Pinewood Studios.

== Plot ==
Inspired by a story that appeared in a 1950s newspaper, the film shows a year in the life of a young girl, Mouche. Deemed too skinny to make a living at the Moulin Rouge, Mouche is cast out and saved from suicide by a group of puppets travelling from town to town performing street puppet shows.

She joins them on their journey and together they become attraction, earning more money than they previously made. The puppets become Mouche's beloved family, yet behind them lurks a cruel and abusive man who is desperately in love with her. "It would have all been so perfect if not for the puppeteer." Mouche must choose to stay for the love of the puppets, or leave to escape the wrath of the puppeteer.

== Reviews ==
- "I thought Dolls was just extraordinary. One of the keys of making short films, you want to create your own universe, have your own voice and this film has a spectacularly different significant, coloured voice. I’ve not seen a short film like it before." - Jeremy Howe, Head of Short Films, BBC
- "Extraordinary in its inventiveness and economy of light. The lighting evokes the mood perfectly." - Alex Thomson, BSC
- "This film is captivating" - Zimbabwe International Film Festival
- "Susan Luciani is an inventive and imaginative writer, very cinematic. Dolls is undeniably a vibrant and original short." - Film Four
