= J. C. Wilsher =

English screenwriter

John Charles Wilsher (credited as J.C. Wilsher) is an English television screenwriter and playwright, best known for dramas relating to the police and law enforcement such as long-running procedural The Bill. His highest profile work was as creator of Between the Lines, which screened in the UK between 1992 and 1994.

== Career ==
He was a researcher at Lancaster University before taking up his writing career, which began by writing for radio. Over forty years on television, he would contribute to several popular series in various genres, such as New Tricks, Torchwood and Death in Paradise. Wilsher is also a Past President and Deputy Chair of the Writers' Guild of Great Britain (WGGB). In 2022, he self-published his memoir, Paper Work: On Being a Writer in Broadcast Drama.

=== Audio commentaries ===
Wilsher has recorded three audio commentaries for The Bill episodes "C.A.D.", "Citadel" and "Workers in Uniform". He is joined for the latter two episodes by actor Chris Humphreys (PC Richard Turnham). They were released on The Bill Podcast Patreon Channel.

== Works ==
=== Radio plays ===
- Interval, starring Eileen Atkins and Edward Woodward (1964)
- Microcosm, starring Paul Schofield and Eric Allen, and directed by Ian Cotterill (1964)
- The Ghosts of the British Museum (1978)
- The Fruit of the Vine (1978)
- Militaria, starring Norman Rodway and Gordon Dulieu (1979)
- Summer School Blues (1980)
- A Fair Hearing (1980)
- A Victim of the Aurora, and adaptation of Thomas Keneally's novel (1980)
- Sunrise over Baldness (1981)
- The Grey Area (1982)
- A Pillar of the Society (1983)
- Orbital Decay (1984)
- Defensible Space (1984)
- A Box of Tricks (1985)
- A Status Passage (1985)
- Fade to Black (1987)
- In-flight Entertainment (1991)

=== Television screenplays ===
- The Quiz Kid (1979)
- "Sin with Our Permission", episode of ITV Playhouse (1981)
- Between the Lines (1992–1994) (WGGB Awards for "Original Drama Series", 1993 & 1995; Royal Television Society & Broadcasting Press Guild Awards for "Best Drama Series", 1993; BAFTA Award for "Best Original Drama Series" 1994)
- Silent Witness, multiple episodes (1996)
- Call Red (1996)
- The Vice, four episodes (1999–2000)
- The Bill (53 episodes) (1989–2001)
- "Disposal", episode of Murder in Mind (2002)
- The Dinosaur Hunters (2002)
- "Favours", episode of Murder in Mind (2003)
- If... Drugs Were Legalised (2005)
- Dust Thou Art, Parts 1 & 2, episodes of Dalziel & Pascoe (2005)
- New Tricks, seven episodes (2006–2011) one of which, "Diamond Geezers" (2006), was co-nominated for the WGGB Award for "Best Soap or Series (Television)".
- Torchwood, episode "Reset"
- Midsomer Murders (episode "Not in My Backyard")
- Death in Paradise (episode "The Early Bird")
