= Julia Johnson =

British singer

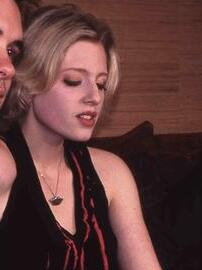
- Johnson with Second Person in 2005

Background information
- Born: 1982 (age 43–44); London, England
- Genres: Acoustic rock, jazz, trip hop
- Occupations: Singer, musician, Author
- Instruments: Vocals, piano, keyboards
- Website: thisisjuliagray.com

Julia Johnson (born 1982) is an English singer, songwriter and a founder-member of the post trip hop band Second Person.

== Early life ==
Johnson is the daughter of writer and former politician Stanley Johnson and his second wife, Jennifer (née Kidd); she has a brother, Maximilian, and their paternal half-siblings are Boris, Rachel, Jo, and Leo Johnson.

== Career ==
Johnson was a founder member of Second Person in 2001; the group remained active until 2011. Her first solo album, I Am Not The Night, recorded at Livingston Recording Studios and produced by Tristan Ivemy (Frank Turner, The Holloways), was released in May 2011 through the independent label Blue January. Her second solo album, Robber Bride, was released in June 2014. Her first novel for young adults, The Otherlife, was published by Andersen Press in July 2016, under the name Julia Gray.

== Personal life ==
In November 2009, The Daily Telegraph reported that Johnson was engaged to film financier Calum Gray. In 2019, Australian media referred to her as having married Gray.

== Other sources ==
- Second Person in The Independent (23 October 2002: p. 12)
- BBC Radio 2 Interview (The Weekender with Matthew Wright - 3 November 2005)
- Future Music interview (November 2005)
