= List of The Bill episodes =

This is a list of episodes of The Bill, which ran from 16 August 1983 to 31 August 2010. 26 series were made.

== Series overview ==
Series	Episodes	Originally released	
Series	Episodes	First released	Last released
0	1	16 August 1983	
1	11	16 October 1984	22 January 1985
2	12	11 November 1985	10 February 1986
3	12	21 September 1987	7 December 1987
4	48	19 July 1988	29 December 1988
5	104	3 January 1989	28 December 1989
6	104	2 January 1990	27 December 1990
7	105	1 January 1991	31 December 1991
8	105	2 January 1992	31 December 1992
9	155	5 January 1993	31 December 1993
10	156	4 January 1994	30 December 1994
11	149	5 January 1995	29 December 1995
12	156	2 January 1996	31 December 1996
13	152	2 January 1997	30 December 1997
14	121	1 January 1998	31 December 1998
15	87	7 January 1999	31 December 1999
16	86	4 January 2000	29 December 2000
17	92	5 January 2001	21 December 2001
18	86	3 January 2002	31 December 2002
19	105	1 January 2003	31 December 2003
20	94	7 January 2004	30 December 2004
21	106	5 January 2005	29 December 2005
22	91	4 January 2006	29 December 2006
23	92	3 January 2007	28 December 2007
24	88	2 January 2008	31 December 2008
25	65	1 January 2009	29 December 2009
26	31	7 January 2010	31 August 2010

== Episodes ==
=== Series 1 (1984–85) ===
No. overall	No. in series	Title	Directed by	Written by	Original release date
1	1	"Funny Ol' Business – Cops and Robbers"	Peter Cregeen	Geoff McQueen	16 October 1984
2	2	"A Friend in Need"	Peter Cregeen	Barry Appleton	23 October 1984
3	3	"Clutching at Straws"	Christopher Hodson	Geoff McQueen	30 October 1984
4	4	"Long Odds"	John Michael Phillips	Geoff McQueen	6 November 1984
5	5	"It's Not Such a Bad Job After All"	John Woods	Barry Appleton	13 November 1984
6	6	"The Drugs Raid"	John Woods	Barry Appleton	20 November 1984
7	7	"A Dangerous Breed"	Christopher Hodson	Barry Appleton	27 November 1984
8	8	"Rough in the Afternoon"	Christopher Hodson	John Kershaw	4 December 1984
9	9	"Burning the Books"	Peter Cregeen	Barry Appleton	8 January 1985
10	10	"Death of a Cracksman"	Christopher Hodson	Barry Appleton	15 January 1985
11	11	"The Sweet Smell of Failure"	John Michael Phillips	Barry Appleton	22 January 1985

=== Series 2 (1985–86) ===
No. overall	No. in series	Title	Directed by	Written by	Original release date
12	1	"Snouts and Red Herrings"	Peter Cregeen	Geoff McQueen	11 November 1985
13	2	"Suspects"	Michael Ferguson	Barry Appleton	18 November 1985
14	3	"Lost"	Christopher Hodson	Ginnie Hole	25 November 1985
15	4	"Home Beat"	John Michael Phillips	Christopher Russell	2 December 1985
16	5	"Hostage"	Michael Ferguson	Barry Appleton	9 December 1985
17	6	"This Little Pig"	John Woods	Christopher Russell	23 December 1985
18	7	"Ringer"	John Woods	Barry Appleton	6 January 1986
19	8	"Public and Confidential"	Christopher Hodson	Lionel Goldstein	13 January 1986
20	9	"Loan Shark"	John Michael Phillips	Tim Aspinall	20 January 1986
21	10	"With Friends Like That...?"	Christopher Hodson	Barry Appleton	27 January 1986
22	11	"Whose Side Are You On?"	Peter Cregeen	Jim Hill	3 February 1986
23	12	"The Chief Super's Party"	Peter Cregeen	Barry Appleton	10 February 1986

=== Series 3 (1987) ===
No. overall	No. in series	Title	Directed by	Written by	Original release date
24	1	"The New Order of Things"	Michael Ferguson	Geoff McQueen	21 September 1987
25	2	"Some You Win, Some You Lose"	Peter Cregeen	Barry Appleton	28 September 1987
26	3	"Brownie Points"	Mary McMurray	Christopher Russell	5 October 1987
27	4	"Missing, Presumed Dead"	Michael Ferguson	Barry Appleton	12 October 1987
28	5	"Domestics"	Peter Cregeen	Edwin Pearce	19 October 1987
29	6	"What Are Little Boys Made Of?"	Peter Duguid	Christopher Russell	26 October 1987
30	7	"Blind Alleys, Clogged Roads"	Graham Theakston	Lionel Goldenstein	2 November 1987
31	8	"Double Trouble"	Michael Ferguson	Barry Appleton	9 November 1987
32	9	"Sun Hill Karma"	Mary McMurray	Christopher Russell	16 November 1987
33	10	"Skipper"	Richard Bramall	Christopher Russell	23 November 1987
34	11	"Overnight Stay"	Graham Theakston	Barry Appleton	30 November 1987
35	12	"Not Without Cause"	Peter Cregeen	Barry Appleton	7 December 1987

=== Series 4 (1988) ===
No. overall	No. in series	Title	Directed by	Written by	Episode notes	Original release date	Guest(s)
TBA	1	"Light Duties"	Derek Lister	Geoff McQueen	First appearances of Insp Christine Frazer, PC Malcolm Haynes and SRO Marion Layland, first credited appearance of PC Tony Stamp, PC Jim Carver is promoted to DC	19 July 1988	Andy Secombe
TBA	2	"The Three Wise Monkeys"	Bill Brayne	Geoff McQueen	First appearance of Ch Insp Derek Conway	21 July 1988	Nick Brimble and Tom Owen
TBA	3	"Good Will Visit"	William Brayne	Barry Appleton	First appearance of PC Pete Ramsey	26 July 1988	Malcolm Kaye and Osaze Ehibor
TBA	4	"Home Sweet Home"	Gareth Davies	Nicholas McInerny	—	28 July 1988	Christian Rodska and John Bowe
TBA	5	"All in Good Faith"	Gareth Davies	Barry Appleton	—	2 August 1988	Leslie Schofield
TBA	6	"Just Call Me Guvnor"	Brian Parker	Geoff McQueen	First regular appearance of DI Frank Burnside	4 August 1988	Russell Lewis
TBA	7	"Caught Red Handed"	Derek Lister	Barry Appleton	—	9 August 1988	—
TBA	8	"Homes and Gardens"	Derek Lister	Christopher Russell	—	11 August 1988	Mark Monero, Brian Peck, Desmond Cullum-Jones and Aidan Gillen
TBA	9	"Country Cousin"	Sharon Miller	Barry Appleton	—	16 August 1988	—
TBA	10	"Alarms and Embarrassments"	Sharon Miller	Christopher Russell	—	18 August 1988	Jeff Rawle and Alison Bettles (credited as Alison Beetles)
TBA	11	"Stealing Cars and Nursery Rhymes"	Paul Harrison	Julian Jones	—	23 August 1988	Tom Cotcher and Patsy Smart
TBA	12	"Hold Fire"	Paul Harrison	Barry Appleton	—	25 August 1988	Walter Sparrow
TBA	13	"Bad Faith"	Frank Smith	Julian Jones	—	30 August 1988	—
TBA	14	"Requiem"	Sharon Miller	Peter J. Hammond	First episode to not feature Sun Hill Police Station within the episode	1 September 1988	Richard Beale and Ronald Leigh-Hunt
TBA	15	"Trespasses"	Brian Parker	Christopher Russell	First appearance of WPC Claire Brind	6 September 1988	Alex McAvoy and Terence Beesley
TBA	16	"Save the Last Dance For Me"	Brian Farnham	Barry Appleton	—	8 September 1988	—
TBA	17	"Runaround"	Derek Lister	Al Hunter	First credited appearance of WPC Suzanne Ford	13 September 1988	John Challis, Linda Robson and Eve Karpf
TBA	18	"The Trap"	Brian Farnham	Jonathan Rich	—	15 September 1988	—
TBA	19	"Community Relations"	Frank Smith	Christopher Russell	—	20 September 1988	—
TBA	20	"A Dog's Life"	Brian Parker	Graeme Curry	—	22 September 1988	—
TBA	21	"Trouble and Strife"	Brian Parker	Julian Jones	—	27 September 1988	Brian Capron
TBA	22	"Running Late"	Sharon Miller	John Milne	—	29 September 1988	—
TBA	23	"They Say We're Rough"	Frank W. Smith	Douglas Watkinson	—	4 October 1988	—
TBA	24	"Blue for a Boy"	Paul Harrison	John Foster	—	6 October 1988	Gerry Cowper and Robert Glenister
TBA	25	"Chasing the Dragon"	Frank W. Smith	Brendan J. Cassin	—	11 October 1988	Terry Sue-Patt
TBA	26	"The Coop"	Graham Theakston	Garry Lyons	—	13 October 1988	—
TBA	27	"The Quick and the Dead"	Philip Casson	Christopher Russell	—	18 October 1988	John Rolfe
TBA	28	"Witness"	Graham Theakston	Christopher Russell	—	20 October 1988	—
TBA	29	"Here We Go Loopy Lou"	Brian Farnham	Julian Jones	—	25 October 1988	—
TBA	30	"Stop And Search"	Terry Marcel	Geoff McQueen	First appearance of DC Tosh Lines	27 October 1988	—
TBA	31	"Spook Stuff"	Terry Marcel	Geoff McQueen	—	1 November 1988	Andrew McCulloch and Daniel Peacock
TBA	32	"Evacuation"	Terry Green	Edwin Peace	—	2 November 1988	Matthew Scurfield, Eddie Tagoe and Jim McManus
TBA	33	"Personal Imports"	Brian Farnham	Kevin Clarke	Some scenes were filmed at Grenfell Tower and immediate surrounding areas, such as Barandon Walk.	8 November 1988	Paul O'Grady (credited as Paul Savage)
TBA	34	"Paper Chase"	Niall Leonard	Barry Appleton	—	10 November 1988	Christine Kavanagh and Sally Faulkner
TBA	35	"Intruder"	Graham Theakston	Roger Parkes	—	15 November 1988	Terence Wilton and Iain Rattray
TBA	36	"Conflict"	Graham Theakston	Al Hunter	—	17 November 1988	Alex Kingston and Russell Lewis
TBA	37	"Duplicates"	Niall Leonard	Simon Moss	—	22 November 1988	—
TBA	38	"Snout"	Paul Harrison	Arthur McKenzie	—	24 November 1988	Desmond McNamara
TBA	39	"Old Habits"	Barry Davis	Nicholas McInerny	—	29 November 1988	Geoffrey Beevers, Hilary Mason, Ralph Nossek, Lee MacDonald and Aimée Delamain
TBA	40	"The Silent Gun"	Terry Marcel	Christopher Russell	—	1 December 1988	James Gaddas, Peter Caffrey, Damaris Hayman, Milo Sperber and Richard Bonehill
TBA	41	"An Old Fashioned Term"	Philip Casson	Geoff McQueen	—	6 December 1988	—
TBA	42	"Getting Stressed"	Philip Casson	Christopher Russell	—	8 December 1988	Tim Preece
TBA	43	"Tigers"	Terry Marcel	Edwin Pearce	—	13 December 1988	Michael Goldie and Patsy Palmer
TBA	44	"Guessing Game"	Jan Sargent	P. J. Hammond	—	15 December 1988	—
TBA	45	"The Assassins"	Terry Daw	Douglas Watkinson	—	20 December 1988	Daniel Flynn, Frank Mills and Owen Brenman
TBA	46	"Outmoded"	Terry Green	Barry Appleton	—	22 December 1988	Michael Fenton Stevens and Brian Miller
TBA	47	"Digging Up the Past"	Barry Davis	Barry Appleton	—	27 December 1988	Dicken Ashworth, Gawn Grainger and Tessa Peake-Jones
TBA	48	"Taken into Consideration"	Christopher Hodson	Lawrence Gray	—	29 December 1988	—

=== Series 5 (1989) ===
No. overall	No. in series	Title	Directed by	Written by	Episode notes	Original release date	Guest(s)
TBA	1	"Getting It Right"	Terry Daw	Barry Appleton	First appearance of DS Alistair Greig	3 January 1989	Bernard Horsfall and Brian Miller
TBA	2	"A Reflection of Glory"	Christopher Hodson	Brendan J. Cassin	—	5 January 1989	Richard Graham and Stefan Schwartz
TBA	3	"One To One"	Jan Sargent	Christopher Russell	—	10 January 1989	Arabella Weir
TBA	4	"The Mugging and the Gypsies"	Barry Davis	David Halliwell	—	12 January 1989	Albert Welling and Melanie Hill
TBA	5	"The Chain of Command"	Robert Tronson	Christopher Short	—	17 January 1989	Stella Gonet and Gilbert Wynne
TBA	6	"Life and Death"	Robert Tronson	Kieran Prendiville	—	19 January 1989	Elisabeth Sladen and Arthur Blake
TBA	7	"Hothead"	Phillip Casson	Edwin Pearce	—	24 January 1989	Larry Martyn, Michael Melia and Stephen Churchett
TBA	8	"Steamers"	Terry Green	Gerry Huxham	—	26 January 1989	Timothy Bateson
TBA	9	"Duty Elsewhere"	Jeremy Summers	Brendan J. Cassin	—	31 January 1989	Ricco Ross
TBA	10	"Saturday Blues"	Jeremy Summers	David Squire	—	2 February 1989	Julia Chambers, Roy Skelton and Adrienne Burgess
TBA	11	"N.F.A."	Keith Washington	Arthur McKenzie	—	7 February 1989	Peter-Hugo Daly, Betty Marsden and John Ringham
TBA	12	"The Price You Pay"	Keith Washington	Kieran Prendiville	—	9 February 1989	Debbie Arnold, Godfrey James and Tony Osoba
TBA	13	"The Key of the Door"	Christopher Hodson	Barry Appleton	—	14 February 1989	Shirin Taylor
TBA	14	"Cock Up"	Brian Farnham	Tony Grounds	—	16 February 1989	Rod Culbertson, Dave Atkins and Ricci Harnett
TBA	15	"Repercussions"	Brian Farnham	Tony Grounds	—	21 February 1989	Rod Culbertson, Dave Atkins and John Fortune
TBA	16	"A Death in the Family"	Christopher Hodson	John Foster	—	23 February 1989	Eric Deacon
TBA	17	"In the Frame"	Barry Davis	Barry Appleton	—	28 February 1989	William Simons
TBA	18	"A Good Result"	Jeremy Summers	Christopher Russell	—	2 March 1989	Oliver Parker
TBA	19	"Conscience"	Jeremy Summers	Barry Appleton	—	7 March 1989	Patrick O'Connell
TBA	20	"Sunday Sunday"	Terry Marcel	Richard LeParmentier and Paddy Fletcher	—	9 March 1989	Ann Way
TBA	21	"Climate"	Brian Parker	P. J. Hammond	—	14 March 1989	Robin Soans
TBA	22	"Bad Company"	Terry Marcel	Brendan J. Cassin	—	16 March 1989	Steve McFadden, Victor Winding and Cyril Shaps
TBA	23	"Suspicious Minds"	Terry Green	Kieran Prendiville	—	21 March 1989	Kellie Bright
TBA	24	"Intuition"	Brian Parker	Jonathan Rich	—	23 March 1989	Del Henney, Trevor Byfield and Harry Fielder
TBA	25	"Loss"	Brian Farnham	P. J. Hammond	—	28 March 1989	—
TBA	26	"Procedure"	Terry Green	John Milne	—	30 March 1989	—
TBA	27	"Luck of the Draw"	Keith Washington	Patrick Harkins	—	4 April 1989	Allan Surtees and Ian Redford
TBA	28	"No Strings"	Brian Farnham	Kevin Clarke	—	6 April 1989	Paul O'Grady (Credited as Paul Savage)
TBA	29	"Fool's Gold"	Keith Washington	David Squire	—	11 April 1989	Billy Murray and Danny Webb
TBA	30	"The Visit"	Alan Wareing	Barry Appleton	—	13 April 1989	John Hamill, Ian Collier, Gordon Reid, Luan Peters and Brian Hall
TBA	31	"One For the Ladies"	Terry Green	Brendan J. Cassin	—	18 April 1989	—
TBA	32	"No Shelter"	Terry Marcel	Julian Jones	—	20 April 1989	Kelly Marcel and Mark Haddigan
TBA	33	"Out to Lunch"	Brian Parker	Julian Jones	—	25 April 1989	Brian Capron, Michael Mellinger and Adrienne Burgess
TBA	34	"Free Wheel"	Alan Wareing	P. J. Hammond	—	27 April 1989	Liz Gebhardt
TBA	35	"Only a Bit of Thieving"	Brian Parker	Chris Barlas	First appearance of PC George Garfield	2 May 1989	Hazel McBride and Nicholas Pinnock
TBA	36	"Communications"	Alan Wareing	Jonathan Rich	—	4 May 1989	Oliver Haden
TBA	37	"Silver Lining"	Mike Dormer	Colin Giffin	—	9 May 1989	Catherine Schell
TBA	38	"Suffocation Job"	Brian Farnham	P. J. Hammond	—	11 May 1989	Yvonne Antrobus and Liz Fraser
TBA	39	"Mickey Would Have Wanted It"	Brian Farnham	Kieran Prendiville	—	16 May 1989	Peter Guinness
TBA	40	"Blood Ties"	Mike Dormer	Chris Barlas	—	19 May 1989	David Collings
TBA	41	"You'll Be Back"	Richard Standeven	Shirley Cooklin	—	23 May 1989	Dominic Keating
TBA	42	"Fort Apache – Sun Hill"	Antonia Bird	Barry Appleton	—	25 May 1989	Tom Georgeson, Bill Stewart and Tip Tipping
TBA	43	"Waste"	Richard Standeven	Al Hunter	—	30 May 1989	Suzanne Bertish and John Barrard
TBA	44	"The Strong Survive"	Sharon Miller	Brendan J. Cassin	—	1 June 1989	Dexter Fletcher and Michael Robbins
TBA	45	"Loving Care"	Michael Owen Morris	Al Hunter	—	6 June 1989	Philippa Urquhart
TBA	46	"Back on the Streets"	Alan Wareing	Simon Moss	—	8 June 1989	—
TBA	47	"FAT'AC"	John Bruce	Julian Jones	—	13 June 1989	Roy Boyd and Tony Haygarth
TBA	48	"Somewhere By Chance"	Terry Marcel	Barry Appleton	—	15 June 1989	Bruce Alexander
TBA	49	"A Quiet Life"	Sharon Miller	Simon Moss	First appearance of PC Cathy Marshall	20 June 1989	Race Davies and Arthur Smith
TBA	50	"Tom Tiddler's Ground"	John Bruce	P. J. Hammond	—	22 June 1989	Peter Benson
TBA	51	"Make My Day"	Michael Ferguson	Barry Appleton	First appearances of PCs Richard Turnham and Timothy Able	27 June 1989	Martin Benson, John Abineri and Arthur Whybrow
TBA	52	"Provocation"	Michael Ferguson	Edwin Pearce	—	29 June 1989	JoAnne Good
TBA	53	"Overspend"	Terry Marcel	Christopher Russell	—	4 July 1989	Colin Spaull and Ralph Watson
TBA	54	"Between Friends"	Barry Davis	Barry Appleton	—	6 July 1989	John Horsley, Richard Moore and David McAlister
TBA	55	"Traffic"	Bill Brayne	Christopher Russell	Final appearance of PC Robin Frank	11 July 1989	Leslie Ash and Gordon Reid
TBA	56	"The Sacred Seal"	Michael Owen Morris	Brendan J. Cassin	—	13 July 1989	Philip Middlemiss
TBA	57	"Subsequent Visits"	Bill Brayne	Arthur McKenzie	—	18 July 1989	—
TBA	58	"User Friendly"	Graham Theakston	Barry Appleton	—	20 July 1989	—
TBA	59	"Don't Like Mondays"	Antonia Bird	Barry Appleton	Final appearance of PC Pete Ramsey	25 July 1989	Helena Little and Natasha Williams
TBA	60	"Pickup"	Michael Owen Morris	John Milne	—	27 July 1989	—
TBA	61	"Kidding"	Michael Ferguson	Jonathan Rich	—	1 August 1989	Madhav Sharma
TBA	62	"Black Spot"	Michael Owen Morris	Arthur McKenzie	—	3 August 1989	Brian Hibbard, Julie Graham and Desmond McNamara
TBA	63	"Taken for a Ride"	Terry Marcel	Barry Appleton	—	8 August 1989	Michael Cochrane and Keith Drinkel
TBA	64	"Time Out"	Terry Marcel	Barry Appleton	—	10 August 1989	Ben Onwukwe, Charles Lawson and Brian Croucher
TBA	65	"Leaving"	Terry Marcel	Christopher Russell	Final regular appearance of PC Yorkie Smith	15 August 1989	Declan Mulholland, Kathy Burke and Elizabeth Bradley
TBA	66	"Street Games and Board Games"	Barry Davis	J. C. Wilsher	—	17 August 1989	Rebecca Lacey and David Savile
TBA	67	"Pressure"	Barry Davis	Kevin Clarke	Final appearance of PC Malcolm Haynes	22 August 1989	Joseph Marcell and Aimée Delamain
TBA	68	"A Little Knowledge"	James Cellan Jones	Christopher Russell	—	24 August 1989	—
TBA	69	"Pathways"	Michael Ferguson	P. J. Hammond	—	29 August 1989	George Waring
TBA	70	"Seen To Be Done"	James Cellan Jones	Jonathan Rich	—	31 August 1989	James Cosmo
TBA	71	"Tulip"	Keith Washington	Barry Appleton	—	5 September 1989	Michael Attwell, Trevor Cooper and Ilario Bisi-Pedro
TBA	72	"Nothing But The Truth"	Keith Washington	Arthur McKenzie	—	7 September 1989	Kevin McNally
TBA	73	"It's Not Majorca"	Niall Leonard	Julian Jones	—	12 September 1989	Zohra Sehgal and Perry Benson
TBA	74	"Mending Fences"	Niall Leonard	Julian Jones	—	14 September 1989	Zohra Sehgal
TBA	75	"Exit Lines"	Derek Lister	Brian Finch	First appearance of PC Norika Datta	19 September 1989	Barbara Durkin and Constance Chapman
TBA	76	"That Old Malarkey"	Barry Davis	Julian Jones	—	21 September 1989	—
TBA	77	"Greig Versus Taylor"	Clive Fleury	Christopher Russell	—	26 September 1989	Derek Newark
TBA	78	"Tottering"	Chris Lovett	Simon Moss	—	28 September 1989	Stephen Garlick and Perry Fenwick
TBA	79	"I Counted Them All Out"	Paul Harrison	Kieran Prendiville	—	3 October 1989	Count Prince Miller
TBA	80	"Zig Zag"	Chris Lovett	P. J. Hammond	—	5 October 1989	Jo Rowbottom and Roy Heather
TBA	81	"A Matter of Trust"	Derek Lister	Kieran Prendiville	—	10 October 1989	Tony O'Callaghan and Sharon Maiden
TBA	82	"Tourist Trap"	Diana Patrick	Pete Dearsley	—	12 October 1989	David Ashton and Petra Markham
TBA	83	"The One That Got Away"	David Attwood	Jonathan Rich	—	17 October 1989	—
TBA	84	"Found Offending"	Eva Kolouchova	John Kershaw	—	19 October 1989	Caroline Milmoe and Tim Whitnall
TBA	85	"All Part of The Job"	Bren Simson	Colin Giffin	—	24 October 1989	Alun Lewis
TBA	86	"In The Cold"	Graham Theakston	J. C. Wilsher	—	26 October 1989	—
TBA	87	"Just a Little Runaround"	Eva Kolouchova	Richard Ireson	—	31 October 1989	Iain Rogerson and Dominic Mafham
TBA	88	"A Fair Appraisal"	Nick Laughland	Garry Lyons	—	2 November 1989	Tessa Peake-Jones, Kenneth Farrington and David Sibley
TBA	89	"Visitors"	Clive Fleury	Kevin Clarke	—	7 November 1989	June Page, Andrew Robertson and Dennis Chinnery
TBA	90	"Private Wars"	Nicholas Prosser	Guy Meredith	—	9 November 1989	Prentis Hancock
TBA	91	"Feasting With Panthers"	Simon Cellan Jones	J. C. Wilsher	—	14 November 1989	—
TBA	92	"By The Book"	Jeremy Silberston	John Milne	—	16 November 1989	Renu Setna and Michael Bilton
TBA	93	"Beer and Bicycles"	Nick Laughland	Christopher Russell	—	21 November 1989	Nigel Humphreys
TBA	94	"Grace of God"	David Hayman	Paddy Fletcher and Richard LeParmentier	—	23 November 1989	Douglas Henshall, Christopher Fairbank, Katherine Parr, Louis Mahoney and Shay Gorman
TBA	95	"Just Another Day"	Nicholas Prosser	J.C Martindale	—	28 November 1989	—
TBA	96	"Gone Fishing"	Nick Laughland	Jonathan Rich	—	30 November 1989	Harry Fowler
TBA	97	"Early Bird"	Eva Kolouchova	Tom Needham	—	5 December 1989	—
TBA	98	"Just for the Crack"	Jeremy Silberston	Steve Trafford	—	7 December 1989	Alan Ford
TBA	99	"Woman in Brown"	Eva Kolouchova	Alan Clews	—	12 December 1989	Mark Greenstreet and Walter Sparrow
TBA	100	"Speaking Freely"	David Attwood	Gary Lyons	—	14 December 1989	—
TBA	101	"The Return of The Prodigal Son"	Keith Washington	John Kershaw	—	19 December 1989	Michael Graham Cox and Karl Johnson
TBA	102	"Chinese Whispers"	Julian Aymes	Christopher Russell	First appearances of PCs Phil Young and Dave Quinnan	21 December 1989	Michael Wisher
TBA	103	"Powers of Exclusion"	Julian Aymes	J. C. Wilsher	—	26 December 1989	Norman Beaton
TBA	104	"Saturday Night Fever"	Bren Simson	Edwin Pearce	Final appearance of WPC Claire Brind	28 December 1989	Gordon Salkilld and Clive Rowe

=== Series 6 (1990) ===
No. overall	No. in series	Title	Directed by	Written by	Episode notes	Original release date
188	1	"By The Skin of Our Teeth"	Bren Simson	Arthur McKenzie	Nigel Le Vaillant and Robert Perkins guest star	2 January 1990
189	2	"Officers and Gentlemen"	Diana Patrick	Steve Trafford	Laurence Harrington guest stars	4 January 1990
190	3	"Carry Your Bags Sir"	Simon Jones	John Milne	Phil Nice and Brigitte Kahn guest star	9 January 1990
191	4	"I Thought You'd Gone"	Nick Laughland	J. C. Wilsher	First appearance of Insp Andrew Monroe, final appearances of PC Francis "Taffy" Edwards and Insp Christine Frazer	11 January 1990
192	5	"C.A.D."	Chris Hodson	J.C. Wilsher	Geraldine Fitzgerald, Stephen Finlay guest star	16 January 1990
193	6	"A Day Lost"	Phillip Casson	Les Pollard	—	18 January 1990
194	7	"A Clean Division"	Derek Lister	Julian Jones	David Lonsdale and Andrew Powell guest star	23 January 1990
195	8	"Roger And Out"	David Giles	John Kershaw	—	25 January 1990
196	9	"Addresses"	Chris Lovett	Peter J. Hammond	Victor Maddern guest stars	30 January 1990
197	10	"Michael Runs The Family Now"	John Michael Phillips	Kieran Prendiville	Roy Holder and Robert Aldous guest star	1 February 1990
198	11	"Against The Odds"	Keith Washington	Arthur McKenzie	Terry Downes and Harry Fielder guest star	6 February 1990
199	12	"Bloodsucker"	Chris Hodson	Steve Trafford	—	8 February 1990
200	13	"Workers in Uniform"	Colm Villa	J.C. Wilsher	—	13 February 1990
201	14	"Something To Hide"	John Michael Phillips	Tom Needham	—	15 February 1990
202	15	"The Old Men's Run"	David Hayman	John Milne	—	20 February 1990
203	16	"Legacies"	Chris Hodson	Peter Gibbs	Wendy van der Plank and Symond Lawes guest star	22 February 1990
204	17	"Yesterday, Today, Tomorrow"	Colm Villa	Geoff McQueen	Louise Lombard, Harry Landis and Jon Finch guest star	27 February 1990
205	18	"Something Special"	David Giles	Guy Meredith	Final appearance of PC Timothy Able; Lorraine Ashbourne and Davyd Harries guest star	1 March 1990
206	19	"Enemies"	Alan Wareing	Philip Martin	Badi Uzzaman guest stars	6 March 1990
207	20	"Safe Place"	Tom Cotter	Peter J. Hammond	Frank Jarvis guest stars	8 March 1990
208	21	"Burnside Knew My Father"	Tom Cotter	Lennie James	Rudolph Walker and David Gooderson guest star	13 March 1990
209	22	"Watching"	Chris Lovett	Peter Gibbs	Norman Rossington guest stars	15 March 1990
210	23	"University Challenge"	Derek Lister	Simon Moss	George Irving and Mary Maude guest star	20 March 1990
211	24	"Growing Pains"	Phillip Casson	Barry Appleton	—	22 March 1990
212	25	"One of the Boys"	Alan Wareing	Jonathan Rich	WPC Viv Martella is promoted to WDC; Andy Serkis guest stars	27 March 1990
213	26	"Beggars and Choosers"	Bob Hird	Steve Trafford	Wally K. Daly and Bryan Coleman guest star	29 March 1990
214	27	"Citadel"	Bob Hird	J.C. Wilsher	Roger Brierley, Christopher Godwin, Jon Glover and Michael Bilton guest star	3 April 1990
215	28	"Blue Eyed Boy"	Nick Laughland	Julian Jones	David Hayman and Kika Mirylees guest star	5 April 1990
216	29	"Full House"	Julian Aymes	Arthur McKenzie	Final appearance of PC Richard Turnham	10 April 1990
217	30	"Big Fish, Little Fish"	Nick Laughland	Patrick Harkins	Oliver Smith guest stars	12 April 1990
218	31	"Information Received"	Michael Simpson	Kevin Clarke	Dean Harris, Ann Mitchell and Paul O'Grady guest star	17 April 1990
219	32	"Close Co-Operation"	Michael Simpson	Garry Lyons	Patrick Cremin and Philip Whitchurch guest star	19 April 1990
220	33	"Middleman"	Michael Simpson	J.C. Wilsher	First appearance of DCI Gordon Wray	24 April 1990
221	34	"Corkscrew"	Michael Simpson	J.C. Wilsher	Matthew Scurfield and Pete Lee-Wilson guest star	26 April 1990
222	35	"Obsessions"	Julian Aymes	Peter Gibbs	Clare Clifford and Nicholas Gecks guest star	1 May 1990
223	36	"Small Hours"	Mike Vardy	Kevin Clarke	David Neilson guest stars	3 May 1990
224	37	"Victims"	Derek Lister	Jonathan Rich	John Cater guest stars	8 May 1990
225	38	"Somebody's Husband"	Derek Lister	Jonathan Rich	John Cater guest stars	10 May 1990
226	39	"Canley Fields"	Mike Vardy	Christopher Russell	Gary Webster guest stars	15 May 1990
227	40	"The Night Watch"	Graham Theakston	J.C. Wilsher	Emma Chambers and Mark Addy guest star	17 May 1990
228	41	"Trojan Horse"	Graham Theakston	Pat Dunlop	Final appearance of PC Ken Melvin	22 May 1990
229	42	"Rites"	Derek Lister	Jonathan Rich	First appearance of PC Barry Stringer; guest appearances of Francis 'Taffy' Edwards and Tony 'Yorkie' Smith; Kika Mirylees guest stars	24 May 1990
230	43	"Answers"	Chris Hodson	Peter J. Hammond	Anthony May guest stars	29 May 1990
231	44	"A Fresh Start"	Derek Lister	Christopher Russell	guest star.	31 May 1990
232	45	"A Case To Answer"	Stuart Burge	J.C. Wilsher	Emma Chambers, Mark Addy and Cyril Nri guest star	5 June 1990
233	46	"Line Up"	Stuart Burge	Elizabeth Anne-Wheal	—	7 June 1990
234	47	"Police Powers"	Gordon Flemyng	Julian Jones	First appearance of PC Steve Loxton; Ian Reddington guest stars	12 June 1990
235	48	"Action Book"	Graham Theakston	Christopher Russell	Michael Garner and Simon Rouse guest star. DSU Jack Meadows appears briefly.	14 June 1990
236	49	"Tactics"	Graham Theakston	Arthur McKenzie	Ben Onwukwe and Desmond McNamara guest star	19 June 1990
237	50	"Scores"	Gordon Flemyng	Peter J. Hammond	First appearance of PC Ron Smollett	21 June 1990
238	51	"Witch Hunt"	Derek Lister	Christopher Russell	Ron Cook guest stars	26 June 1990
239	52	"Close To Home"	Nick Laughland	Christopher Russell	Doña Croll guest stars	28 June 1990
240	53	"Breaking Point"	Peter Barber-Fleming	Les Pollard	—	3 July 1990
241	54	"Jumping The Gun"	Peter Barber-Fleming	David Hoskins	—	5 July 1990
242	55	"What Kind of Man"	Chris Lovett	Christopher Russell	Jim McManus guest stars	10 July 1990
243	56	"Beat Crime"	Nick Laughland	J.C. Wilsher	John Alford and Lyndam Gregory guest star	12 July 1990
244	57	"Unsocial Hours"	Derek Lister	J.C. Wilsher	Peter Benson guest stars	17 July 1990
245	58	"Interpretations"	Julian Aymes	Jonathan Rich	Shaheen Khan and Jenna Russell guest star	19 July 1990
246	59	"Angles"	Roger Tucker	Arthur McKenzie	—	24 July 1990
247	60	"Watch My Lips"	Julian Aymes	Patrick Harkins	—	26 July 1990
248	61	"Feeling Brave"	Richard Holthouse	John Milne	Colin McCormack and Shirin Taylor guest star	31 July 1990
249	62	"Come Fly With Me"	Michael Kerrigan	Peter Gibbs	Albert Moses, Tariq Yunus and Raymond Llewellyn guest star	2 August 1990
250	63	"Attitudes"	Richard Holthouse	Arthur McKenzie	Liz Gebhardt guest stars	7 August 1990
251	64	"Robbo"	Chris Lovett	Brian Finch	John Bardon guest stars	9 August 1990
252	65	"Ground Rules"	Michael Kerrigan	Geoff McQueen	Andrew McCulloch guest stars	14 August 1990
253	66	"Once a Copper"	Frank W Smith	Robin Mukherjee	—	16 August 1990
254	67	"Vendetta"	Graham Theakston	Peter Brooks	Amanda Mealing and Luan Peters guest star	21 August 1990
255	68	"My Favourite Things"	Roger Tucker	Arthur McKenzie	Sue Woodford guest stars	23 August 1990
256	69	"Win Some Lose Some"	Jeremy Ancock	Jonathan Rich	Colin Jeavons guest stars	28 August 1990
257	70	"Up The Steps"	Jeremy Ancock	Carolyn Sally Jones	Dominic Jephcott and Eileen Helsby guest star	30 August 1990
258	71	"Where There's a Will"	Garth Tucker	Patrick Harkins	Bernard Gallagher guest stars	4 September 1990
259	72	"Near The Knuckle"	Nick Hamm	Ayshe Raif	Dorothy Tutin and David Quilter guest star	6 September 1990
260	73	"Body Language"	Nick Hamm	Dick Sharples	Ian Redford and Geoffrey Beevers guest star	11 September 1990
261	74	"When Did You Last See Your Father"	Bob Gabriel	Barry Appleton	Billy Murray, Brian Rawlinson and Gertan Klauber guest star	13 September 1990
262	75	"Eye-Witness"	Graham Theakston	Christopher Penfold	David Harewood guest stars	18 September 1990
263	76	"Sufficient Evidence"	Garth Tucker	Rib Davis	Abigail Thaw guest stars	20 September 1990
264	77	"Forget-Me-Not"	Frank W Smith	Russell Lewis	Jack Ellis guest stars	25 September 1990
265	78	"Something to Remember"	Laura Sims	Christopher Russell	First appearance of DAC Trevor Hicks; Pippa Hinchley guest stars	27 September 1990
266	79	"Off The Leash"	Chris Hodson	Christopher Russell	First appearance of WPC Delia French; Declan Mulholland guest stars	2 October 1990
267	80	"Family Ties"	Chris Lovett	Martyn Wade	John Golightly and David Quilter guest star	4 October 1990
268	81	"Old Friends"	Michael Kerrigan	Nick Collins	Sydney Livingstone and Marian McLoughlin guest star	9 October 1990
269	82	"Pride and Prejudice"	Laura Sims	Tim Firth	David Easter guest stars	11 October 1990
270	83	"Housey Housey"	William Brayne	John Chambers	Sian Thomas and Paul Copley guest star	16 October 1990
271	84	"Connelly's Kids"	Chris Lovett	Michael Cameron	—	18 October 1990
272	85	"One of Those Days"	Nick Laughland	Roger Leach	—	23 October 1990
273	86	"Jack-The-Lad"	Bill Hays	Michael Baker	Linda Marlowe and Jacquetta May guest star	25 October 1990
274	87	"Blue Murder"	Stuart Urban	Russell Lewis	Bob Mason, Patsy Palmer and Lee MacDonald guest star	30 October 1990
275	88	"Effective Persuaders"	Nick Laughland	J.C. Wilsher	Ron Donachie and Tony Rohr guest star	1 November 1990
276	89	"A Sense of Duty"	Bill Hays	Julian Jones	Jeremy Nicholas guest stars	6 November 1990
277	90	"Lying in Wait"	William Brayne	Chris Boucher	Simon Rouse	8 November 1990
278	91	"Plato For Policemen"	Chris Hodson	Robin Mukherjee	Kerry Peers, Simon Rouse and Charles Kay guest star	13 November 1990
279	92	"Testimony"	Chris Hodson	Robin Mukherjee	Bruce Alexander, Kerry Peers and Nicola Stapleton guest star	15 November 1990
280	93	"Decisions"	Tom Cotter	Arthur McKenzie	Patricia Hayes and Patricia Brake guest star	20 November 1990
281	94	"Know Your Enemy"	Moria Armstrong	Nick Collins	Jamie Foreman and Beryl Cooke guest star	22 November 1990
282	95	"Lies"	Roger Tucker	Brendan McDonald	Adele Silva guest stars	27 November 1990
283	96	"Old Wounds"	Roger Tucker	Ian Briggs	Alan Ford guest stars	29 November 1990
284	97	"Just for a Moment"	Tom Cotter	Susan Shattock	Charlie Creed-Miles guest stars	4 December 1990
285	98	"Market Forces"	Sarah Pia Anderson	Peter Brooks	Steven Mackintosh, Roberta Taylor and Peter Craze guest star	6 December 1990
286	99	"One for the Road"	John Strickland	Michael Crompton	Philip Whitchurch, Lloyd McGuire and Tracey Wilson guest star	11 December 1990
287	100	"Start with the Whistle"	John Strickland	J.C. Wilsher	First appearance of Sgt Joseph Corrie, final regular appearance of Sgt Tom Penny; Stephen Churchett guest stars	13 December 1990
288	101	"Out of The Blue"	Moria Armstrong	J.C. Wilsher	Alec Christie and Peter Ferdinando guest star	18 December 1990
289	102	"Street Smart"	Sarah Pia Anderson	J.C. Wilsher	First appearance of DCI Kim Reid; final appearance of DCI Gordon Wray; Robert Wisdom and Morgan Deare guest star	20 December 1990
290	103	"Safe As Houses"	Tom Cotter	Russell Lewis	First appearance of Sgt John Maitland; Ken Hutchison guest stars	26 December 1990
291	104	"Friends and Neighbours"	Mike Dormer	Christopher Russell	Brian Croucher, Doug Bradley, Allan Surtees and Richard Davies guest star	27 December 1990

=== Series 7 (1991) ===
No. overall	No. in series	Title	Directed by	Written by	Episode notes	Original release date
292	1	"Grief"	Graham Theakston	Arthur McKenzie	Samantha Janus, Elizabeth Bradley and Eve White guest star	1 January 1991
293	2	"The Chase"	Stuart Urban	Carol Harrison	Richard Graham and Ian Liston guest star	3 January 1991
294	3	"The Attack"	John Black	Philip Palmer	—	8 January 1991
295	4	"Crown V. Cooper"	Michael Kerrigan	Jane Hollowood	Robin Sachs and Nicholas Courtney guest star	10 January 1991
296	5	"The Girl Can't Help It"	John Strickland	Arthur McKenzie	Trevor Peacock and Shirley Stelfox guest star	15 January 1991
297	6	"Machines"	Bob Gabriel	Peter J. Hammond	Meera Syal, Royce Mills and Henry Goodman guest star	17 January 1991
298	7	"Loophole"	John Strickland	Michael Baker	Donald Bisset and Arthur Whybrow guest star	22 January 1991
299	8	"Bottle"	Graham Theakston	Arthur McKenzie	—	24 January 1991
300	9	"Samaritan"	John Black	Brian Finch	David Bamber and Mary Jo Randle guest star	29 January 1991
301	10	"Fear or Favour"	Mike Dormer	Christopher Russell	Rudolph Walker, Karl Collins and Louis Mahoney guest star	31 January 1991
302	11	"Start To Finish"	Laura Sims	Graham Ison	Guest appearance of ex-Sgt Tom Penny; Patrick Jordan guest star	5 February 1991
303	12	"Night and Day"	Michael Owen Morris	Russell Lewis	John Woodnutt guest stars	7 February 1991
304	13	"Favours"	Bob Blagden	Martyn Wade	Stuart McGugan, Margery Mason and Ron Pember guest star	12 February 1991
305	14	"In Chambers"	Michael Owen Morris	Carolyn Sally Jones	John Moulder-Brown, Valentine Pelka, Robert Gwilym, Louise Jameson and Christian Rodska guest star	14 February 1991
306	15	"Kids Don't Cry Anymore"	Tom Cotter	Barry Appleton	Patrick O'Connell and Rita May guest star	19 February 1991
307	16	"Too Many Chiefs"	David Hayman	Tony Etchells	Simon O’Brien guest star	21 February 1991
308	17	"Every Mother's Son"	Laura Sims	Patrick Harkins	Stefan Kalipha guest stars	26 February 1991
309	18	"Furthers"	Brian Farnham	Robin Mukherjee	Nigel Terry, Felicity Montagu and Johnnie Wade guest star	28 February 1991
310	19	"Closing The Net"	Michael Brayshaw	Robin Mukherjee	Ian Bleasdale, Caroline Webster and Harry Fielder guest star	5 March 1991
311	20	"The Public Interest"	Sarah Pia Anderson	Christopher Russell	Geoffrey Freshwater guest stars	7 March 1991
312	21	"Photo Finish"	Bob Blagden	David Hoskins	Chesney Hawkes, Sharon Duce and Paul Reynolds guest star	12 March 1991
313	22	"Just Desserts"	Alan Bell	Christopher Russell	Mary Healey, John Rolfe and Helen Blatch guest star	14 March 1991
314	23	"832 Receiving"	Alan Bell	Barbara Cox	Vilma Hollingbery, Jaye Griffiths and Don Gilet guest star	19 March 1991
315	24	"The Better Part of Valour"	David Hayman	Arthur McKenzie	Robert Carlyle, Richard Beale and Leslie Schofield guest star	21 March 1991
316	25	"Double Or Quits"	Bill Pryde	Rib Davis	Su Elliot, Ian Gelder, John Ramm and Nicola Stapleton guest star	26 March 1991
317	26	"We Could Be Heroes"	John Strickland	Tony Etchells	Robert Blythe and Mark Lewis Jones guest star	28 March 1991
318	27	"Cold Turkey, Part One: Lifeline"	Gordon Flemyng	J. C. Wilsher	Rupert Holliday-Evans, Andrew Burt, Keith Marsh, Renu Setna and David Quilter guest star	2 April 1991
319	28	"Cold Turkey, Part Two: Late Turn Sunday"	Gordon Flemyng	J.C. Wilsher	Rupert Holliday-Evans guest stars	4 April 1991
320	29	"Now We're Motoring"	Michael Brayshaw	J.C. Wilsher	Mary Tamm and David Sibley guest star	9 April 1991
321	30	"Dead Man's Boots"	John Glenister	Julian Jones	Liz Smith guest stars	11 April 1991
322	31	"Caught Napping"	John Strickland	Russell Lewis	David Banks guest stars	16 April 1991
323	32	"Hammer To Fall"	Richard Holthouse	Russell Lewis	Gary Whelan guest stars	18 April 1991
324	33	"Cry Havoc"	Stuart Urban	Russell Lewis	Marc Warren guest stars	23 April 1991
325	34	"Rules of Engagement"	David Attwood	Elizabeth Anne-Wheal	Shaun Scott guest stars	25 April 1991
326	35	"Delivery on Time"	David Attwood	Jonathan Myerson	Ian Collier guest stars	30 April 1991
327	36	"Black Monday"	Alan Bell	Peter J. Hammond	Marcia Warren guest stars	2 May 1991
328	37	"Jobs for the Boys"	Alan Bell	Carolyn Sally Jones	Bob Mason, Michael Bilton and Colin Higgins guest star	7 May 1991
329	38	"Without Consent"	Derek Lister	Julian Jones	Martin Marquez guest stars	9 May 1991
330	39	"Saints and Martyrs"	John Glenister	Christopher Russell	Walter Sparrow guest stars	14 May 1991
331	40	"Observation"	Sarah Pia Anderson	Martyn Wade	—	16 May 1991
332	41	"The Greater Good"	Mike Dormer	David Hoskins	Barry Jackson guest stars	21 May 1991
333	42	"The Best You Can Buy"	Moira Armstrong	Christopher Russell	Karl Collins and Donald Douglas guest star	23 May 1991
334	43	"Addict"	Chris Lovett	Victoria Taylor	Laurence Harrington guest stars	25 May 1991
335	44	"Black Mark"	Bill Pryde	Phillip Palmer	—	30 May 1991
336	45	"The Right Thing To Do"	Brian Parker	Kieran Prendiville	Anton Phillips, Tony Guilfoyle and Valentine Nonyela guest star	4 June 1991
337	46	"The Harder They Fall"	Chris Lovett	Tony Etchells	—	6 June 1991
338	47	"Something Personal"	Brian Parker	Brendan J. Cassin	Michael Robbins guest stars	11 June 1991
339	48	"Hijack"	Derek Lister	Phillip Palmer	Ian Burfield guest stars	13 June 1991
340	49	"With Intent"	Bill Pryde	Carolyn Sally Jones	Peter Wight, Stephen Boxer and Owen Brenman guest star	18 June 1991
341	50	"Initiative"	Mike Dormer	J.C. Wilsher	Helen Pearson and Gerry Cowper guest star	20 June 1991
342	51	"Careless Whispers"	Derek Lister	Edward Dumas	Joan Ann Maynard and Garry Cooper guest star	25 June 1991
343	52	"Minimum Force"	William Brayne	Simon Andrew Stirling	Jo-Anne Knowles guest stars	27 June 1991
344	53	"Skeletons"	Brian Farnham	Kevin Clarke	Alex Kingston, Martine McCutcheon, Ken Campbell and Jamila Massey guest star	2 July 1991
345	54	"Targets"	Suri Krishnamma	J.C. Wilsher	Tim Dry and Jake Wood guest star	4 July 1991
346	55	"The Negotiator"	Stuart Urban	Paul Bond	Roger Lloyd-Pack, Kathy Burke and Wendy Padbury guest star	9 July 1991
347	56	"Reputations"	Suri Krishnamma	Simon Moss	Meera Syal guest stars	11 July 1991
348	57	"The Juggler and the Fortune Teller"	Alan Bell	Barry Appleton	Victoria Burgoyne, Nigel Harman and Larry Martyn guest star	16 July 1991
349	58	"Joey"	Derek Lister	J.C. Wilsher	Penelope Nice, Neil Maskell and Adam Godley guest star	18 July 1991
350	59	"Your Shout"	Bill Pryde	Julian Jones	Maureen Beattie and Nadia Chambers guest star	23 July 1991
351	60	"Ladykiller"	Moira Armstrong	Steve Trafford	—	25 July 1991
352	61	"A Corporal of Horse"	Mike Vardy	Julian Jones	William Gaminara, Kathleen Byron, Kevin Stoney and David Michaels guest star	30 July 1991
353	62	"Cause and Effect"	Jan Sargent	Christopher Russell	Susan Wooldridge guest stars	1 August 1991
354	63	"Getting Involved"	Richard Holthouse	Stephen Churchett	—	6 August 1991
355	64	"Benefit of the Doubt"	Mike Vardy	Jonathan Myerson	David McAlister guest stars	8 August 1991
356	65	"Crack-Up"	William Brayne	Barry Appleton	John Grillo guest stars	13 August 1991
357	66	"The Last Laugh"	Denny Lawrence	Duncan Gould	Tom Chadbon and Nigel Lambert guest star	15 August 1991
358	67	"Access"	Brian Parker	Tony Attard	Michael Feast guest stars	20 August 1991
359	68	"Six of One"	Sharon Miller	Rib Davis	Susan Lynch guest stars	22 August 1991
360	69	"Married to the Job"	Brian Parker	Roger Leach	Bernard Holley guest stars	27 August 1991
361	70	"Domestic"	Graham Theaktson	Phillip Palmer	—	29 August 1991
362	71	"Stress Rules"	Jan Sargent	Robin Mukherjee	René Zagger guest stars	3 September 1991
363	72	"They Also Serve"	David Hayman	Russell Lewis	John Bennett guest stars	5 September 1991
364	73	"Inside Job"	Denny Lawrence	Simon Moss	—	10 September 1991
365	74	"Bones of Contention"	Sarah Pia Anderson	Susan Shattock	—	12 September 1991
366	75	"Wide of The Mark"	Chris Lovett	David Hoskins	Michael Goldie and Gordon Salkilld guest star	17 September 1991
367	76	"Hitting The Mark"	Mike Dormer	Steve Trafford	Jo Rowbottom, Michael Goldie and Gordon Salkilld guest star	19 September 1991
368	77	"Bending the Rules"	Alan Bell	Eric Deacon	David Quilter guest stars	24 September 1991
369	78	"Skint"	Graham Theakston	Brendan Martin	—	26 September 1991
370	79	"Friday and Counting"	Bill Pryde	Barry Appleton	Dominic Guard and Leonard Maguire guest star	1 October 1991
371	80	"Lest We Forget"	Bill Pryde	Victoria Taylor	Dermot Crowley guest stars	3 October 1991
372	81	"Nutters"	Richard Holthouse	Phillip Palmer	Dicken Ashworth and Daniel Peacock guest star	8 October 1991
373	82	"Downtime"	Richard Holthouse	Peter J. Hammond	Patricia Quinn and Iain Rattray guest star	10 October 1991
374	83	"Out of Order"	David Hayman	Dave Simpson	Final appearance of Sgt Joseph Corrie	15 October 1991
375	84	"Empire Building"	Nicholas Laughland	Phillip Palmer	—	17 October 1991
376	85	"Innocence"	Sarah Pia Anderson	Victoria Taylor	Title sequence updated; Ray Winstone guest stars	22 October 1991
377	86	"Losing It"	Jim Goddard	Russell Lewis	—	24 October 1991
378	87	"Shots"	Chris Lovett	J.C. Wilsher	Patsy Palmer and Thomas Craig guest star	29 October 1991
379	88	"The Square Peg"	Jim Goddard	Christopher Russell	Final appearance of PC Phil Young	31 October 1991
380	89	"A Question of Confidence"	Jan Sargent	Robin Mukherjee	Katharine Rogers guest stars	5 November 1991
381	90	"Balls in the Air"	Sharon Miller	J.C. Wilsher	First appearance of Sgt Matthew Boyden	7 November 1991
382	91	"The Taste"	Alan Bell	Julian Jones	Caroline Milmoe and James Coombes guest star	12 November 1991
383	92	"Turning Back The Clock"	Aisling Walsh	Barry Appleton	Neil Dudgeon and David Quilter guest star	14 November 1991
384	93	"Discretion"	Niall Leonard	Edward Dumas	First appearance of PC Donna Harris; Frank Mills and Kevork Malikyan guest star	19 November 1991
385	94	"Chapter and Verse"	Aisling Walsh	Carolyn Sally Jones	—	21 November 1991
386	95	"The Whole Truth"	Duncan Gould	Geoff McQueen	Eve Pearce and James Walker guest star	26 November 1991
387	96	"Profit and Loss"	Nicholas Laughland	Tony Etchells	—	28 November 1991
388	97	"Thicker Than Water"	Sarah Pia Anderson	Matthew Wingett	—	3 December 1991
389	98	"On The Take"	Patrick Lau	Steve Trafford	—	5 December 1991
390	99	"Caring"	Aisling Walsh	Anthony Valentine	Ann Mitchell guest stars	10 December 1991
391	100	"The Sorcerer's Apprentice"	Derek Lister	Victoria Taylor	Jonny Lee Miller, Ian Mercer and Zig Byfield guest star	12 December 1991
392	101	"Imposters"	Bill Hays	Tony McHale	James Hooton, Ronan Vibert and Kevin Allen guest star	17 December 1991
393	102	"A Woman Scorned"	Derek Lister	Victoria Taylor	—	19 December 1991
394	103	"Vital Statistics"	Jeremy Summers	Christopher Russell	TBA	24 December 1991
395	104	"Decent People"	Mike Dormer	Edward Dumas	Gillian McCutcheon guest stars	26 December 1991
396	105	"Breakout"	Frank W. Smith	Carolyn Sally Jones	TBA	31 December 1991

=== Series 8 (1992) ===
No. in series	Title	Directed by	Written by	Episode notes	Original release date
1	"The Best Policy"	Derek Lister	Victoria Taylor	Clive Wedderburn guest stars	2 January 1992
2	"A Friend in Need"	Bill Pryde	Duncan Gould	Edmund Pegge guest stars	7 January 1992
3	"Whose Side Are You On?"	Bill Hays	Duncan Gould	William Simons and Tom Kelly guest star	9 January 1992
4	"Lip Service"	Derek Lister	Arthur Ellis	Oliver Smith, Ian Reddington, Sherrie Hewson and Samantha Womack guest star	14 January 1992
5	"Illegals"	Laura Sims	Christopher Russell	—	16 January 1992
6	"Fair Play"	Niall Leonard	Mark Holloway	Alex Walkinshaw, Roger Griffiths and Jason Isaacs guest star	21 January 1992
7	"Dinosaur"	Laura Sims	Victoria Taylor	Jo Martin, Trevor Byfield and Jeremy Bulloch guest star	23 January 1992
8	"Joyride"	John Strickland	Mike Harris	Colin Spaull and Terry Molloy guest star	28 January 1992
9	"Not Waving"	Richard Holthouse	Russell Lewis	Dexter Fletcher guest stars	30 January 1992
10	"Mates"	Derek Lister	Philip Palmer	Annie Hulley guest stars	4 February 1992
11	"Lost Boy"	Nicholas Laughland	Mark Holloway	Robert Glenister guest stars	6 February 1992
12	"Chicken"	Chris Lovett	Julian Jones	Liz Gebhardt guest stars,	11 February 1992
13	"Somebody Special"	John Strickland	Christopher Russell	Final regular appearance of DCI Kim Reid; Bronagh Gallagher guest stars	13 February 1992
14	"Previous Convictions"	Aisling Walsh	Tony Etchells	—	18 February 1992
15	"Beggar My Neighbour"	Niall Leonard	Jonathan Whitten	Beryl Cooke guest stars	20 February 1992
16	"It's a Small World"	Bill Pryde	Barry Appleton	Ian Redford, Kenneth Cope and Paul Jerricho guest star	25 February 1992
17	"Licence"	Gordon Flemyng	Neil McKay	Sally Rogers and Tom Georgeson guest star	27 February 1992
18	"Comeback"	John Darnell	Julian Jones	—	3 March 1992
19	"Fireproof"	Mike Dormer	Julian Jones	Rachel Victoria Roberts guest stars	5 March 1992
20	"The Paddy Factor"	Chris Lovett	J. C. Wilsher	Edward Peel, Jimmy Yuill guest star	10 March 1992
21	"The Wild Rover"	Chris Lovett	J.C. Wilsher	Final appearance of WPC Suzanne Ford; Edward Peel, Jimmy Yuill and Clare Clifford guest star	12 March 1992
22	"Coincidence"	Patrick Lau	Peter J. Hammond	Rod Culbertson and Denise Black guest star	17 March 1992
23	"Going Soft"	Derek Lister	Barry Appleton	Sharon Duncan-Brewster, Anna Cropper and Freddie Earlle guest star	19 March 1992
24	"Re-Hab"	Derek Lister	Tony Etchells	First regular appearance of DCI Jack Meadows	24 March 1992
25	"Acting Detective"	Nicholas Laughland	Mark Holloway	Final appearance of PC Delia French	26 March 1992
26	"Stopover"	Aisling Walsh	Peter J. Hammond	Edward Burnham guest stars	31 March 1992
27	"Suspects"	Richard Holthouse	Philip Palmer	Eric Deacon and Roger Blake guest star	2 April 1992
28	"All the King's Horses"	John Darnell	Duncan Gould	—	7 April 1992
29	"Party Politics"	Alan Bell	Susan Shattock	Dominic Keating, Barbara Wilshere and Derek Martin guest star	9 April 1992
30	"Trials and Tribulations"	Chris Lovett	Anthony Valentine	Final regular appearance of Sgt Alec Peters; Amelda Brown guest stars	14 April 1992
31	"A Can of Worms"	Charles Beeson	Duncan Gould	Andrew Carr guest stars	16 April 1992
32	"Timing"	Aisling Walsh	Russell Lewis	Robin Soans guest stars	21 April 1992
33	"A Nice Little Line in Plastic"	Sarah Pia Anderson	Margaret Simpson	—	23 April 1992
34	"Trial and Error"	Alan Bell	Edward Dumas	Ian McElhinney, John Hannah and Ben Aris guest star	28 April 1992
35	"Owning Up"	Charles Beeson	Martyn Wade	—	30 April 1992
36	"Up Behind"	Sarah Pia Anderson	J.C. Wilsher	—	5 May 1992
37	"Appearances"	Patrick Lau	Simon Moss	John Duttine guest stars	7 May 1992
38	"Principled Negotiation"	Gordon Flemyng	J.C. Wilsher	Pete Postlethwaite guest stars	12 May 1992
39	"Sign of Our Times"	Laura Sims	David Squire	Lindsey Coulson guest stars	14 May 1992
40	"Priorities"	Anya Camilleri	Neil McKay	—	19 May 1992
41	"Users"	Laura Sims	Simon Moss	Elizabeth Carling guest stars	21 May 1992
42	"Man of the People"	Richard Holthouse	Christopher Russell	—	26 May 1992
43	"Runaway"	Derek Lister	Christopher Russell	Colin McCormack guest stars	28 May 1992
44	"Exposures"	Richard Holthouse	Mark Holloway	Ché Walker, Gemma Craven and David Schofield guest star	2 June 1992
45	"Better the Devil"	Jeremy Silberston	Russell Lewis	Rudolph Walker, Andrew Powell and Caroline John guest star	4 June 1992
46	"Prisoners"	Chris Lovett	Victoria Taylor	—	9 June 1992
47	"World To Rights"	Graham Theakston	Russell Lewis	Jeremy Young guest stars	11 June 1992
48	"Do the Right Thing"	Christopher Hodson	Marianne Colbran	—	16 June 1992
49	"Hiding to Nothing"	Graham Theakston	Jonathan Rich	—	18 June 1992
50	"Punching Judy"	Moira Armstrong	Russell Lewis	—	22 June 1992
51	"Vicious Circles"	Christopher Hodson	Duncan Gould	Carol Harrison guest stars	25 June 1992
52	"Up All Night"	Mike Dormer	Tony Etchells	Cindy O'Callaghan guest stars	30 June 1992
53	"Part of the Furniture"	Udayan Prasad	Christopher Russell	Final regular appearance of DC Mike Dashwood; Linda Henry and James Garbutt guest star	2 July 1992
54	"Snakes and Ladders"	Mike Dormer	Tony Etchells	—	7 July 1992
55	"Street Cleaning"	Laura Sims	Christopher Russell	—	9 July 1992
56	"Hands Up"	Michael Simpson	Christopher Russell	First appearance of DC Alan Woods; Cheryl Hall and Rowena Cooper guest star	14 July 1992
57	"A Scandalous Act"	Anya Camilleri	Anthony Valentine	Guest appearance of now-Det Supt Kim Reid; Martine McCutcheon guest stars	16 July 1992
58	"Raiders"	Brian Parker	Rib Davis	Janet Lees Price guest stars	21 July 1992
59	"Talk Out"	Brian Parker	Peter J. Hammond	—	23 July 1992
60	"True Confessions"	Jeremy Silberston	Edward Dumas	Tenniel Evans guest stars	28 July 1992
61	"Private Enterprise"	Patrick Lau	Carolyn Sally Jones	Lucy Benjamin guest stars	29 July 1992
62	"Getting Through"	Andrew Higgs	Carolyn Sally Jones	Roberta Taylor and Brian Croucher guest star	4 August 1992
63	"Last Night of Freedom"	Chris Clough	Lizzie Mickery	Jamie Foreman guest stars	6 August 1992
64	"Cutting Loose"	Chris Clough	Steve Trafford	Allan Corduner and Jonathan Kydd guest star	11 August 1992
65	"Soft Target"	Laura Sims	Roy MacGregor	Paterson Joseph and Michael Ripper guest star	13 August 1992
66	"I've Never Been to Harrogate"	Moira Armstrong	Christopher Russell	Charles Kay guest stars	18 August 1992
67	"Human Resources"	Andrew Higgs	Robert Jones	Bruce Alexander guest stars	20 August 1992
68	"Exit"	Tom Cotter	Peter J. Hammond	Sarah Alexander guest stars	25 August 1992
69	"Loyalties"	Tom Cotter	Duncan Gould	Dean Gaffney guest stars	27 August 1992
70	"Snap Shot"	Mike Dormer	Tony Etchells	Colin Wells guest stars	1 September 1992
71	"Letting Go"	Chris Lovett	Joanne Maguire	Martin Marquez and Alan Westaway guest star	3 September 1992
72	"Travelling Light"	Sheree Folkson	Rod Lewis	—	8 September 1992
73	"Radio Waves"	Chris Lovett	Simon Moss	Stephen Lord and Joe Absolom guest stars	10 September 1992
74	"A Blind Eye"	Mike Dormer	Julian Jones	Russell Boulter, Adjoa Andoh and Eileen Way guest star	15 September 1992
75	"Sympathy for the Devil"	Sheree Folkson	Edward Dumas	Harry Fowler and Vladek Sheybal guest star	17 September 1992
76	"Force Is Part of the Service"	Anya Camilleri	J.C. Wilsher	David Harewood and Sally Faulkner guest star	22 September 1992
77	"On the Record, Off the Record"	Anya Camilleri	David Hoksins	Alan Ford, Allan Corduner, Treva Etienne and Roy Heather guest star	24 September 1992
78	"Stoning the Glasshouse"	David Attwood	Anthony Valentine	Anthony Daniels, Mark Arden and Stephen Moore guest star	29 September 1992
79	"Tip-Off"	John Darnell	Sebastian Walker	Brian Capron guest stars	1 October 1992
80	"Open to Offers"	Roger Gartland	Russell Lewis	Tim McInnerny guest stars	6 October 1992
81	"Playing God"	Roger Gartland	Margaret Phelan	Pat Nye guest stars	8 October 1992
82	"Crack of Doom"	John Darnell	Gregory Evans	—	13 October 1992
83	"Spit and Polish"	Frank W. Smith	Robert Jones	First appearance of WPC Polly Page; George Irving guest stars	15 October 1992
84	"Overdue"	Chris Lovett	J.C. Wilsher	Lloyd McGuire, Paul Ritter and Nicola Duffett guest star	20 October 1992
85	"We Should Be Talking"	David Attwood	Duncan Gould	Hugo Speer guest stars	22 October 1992
86	"Reasonable Grounds"	Colm Villa	Julian Spilsbury	June Page and Larry Martyn guest star	27 October 1992
87	"Discipline"	Colm Villa	Joanna Maguire	Gary Whelan guest stars	29 October 1992
88	"Minefield"	Jean Stewart	Carolyn Sally Jones	Selina Cadell and Sam Kelly guest star	3 November 1992
89	"Gamers"	Frank W. Smith	Jonathan Myerson	Gordon Warnecke guest stars	5 November 1992
90	"Occupational Hazard"	Jean Stewart	Carolyn Sally Jones	First appearance of PC Gary McCann	10 November 1992
91	"Just Send Some Flowers"	Chris Lovett	Michael Jenner	Adrian Lester and Liz Crowther guest star	12 November 1992
92	"Waifs and Strays"	Haldance Duncan	Jonathan Rich	Gavin Richards and Barbara Keogh guest star	17 November 1992
93	"Happy Families"	Andrew Higgs	David Hoskins	Charlotte Coleman guest stars	19 November 1992
94	"Well Out of Order"	Peter Smith	Steve Trafford	—	24 November 1992
95	"Into the Mire"	Peter Smith	Steve Trafford	—	26 November 1992
96	"Master of the House"	Derek Lister	Christopher Russell	—	1 December 1992
97	"Fireworks"	Nicholas Laughland	Duncan Gould	Neil Maskell and Jenny McCracken guest star	3 December 1992
98	"Cold Shoulder"	Haldane Duncam	Tony Etchells	—	8 December 1992
99	"Safety First"	Nicholas Laughland	Mick Duffy	—	10 December 1992
100	"Counting the Cost"	Laurence Moody	Anthony Valentine	Stanley Townsend guest stars	15 December 1992
101	"Compassion"	Chris Lovett	Frank Kippax	—	17 December 1992
102	"Finders Keepers"	Derek Lister	Christopher Russell	Guest appearance of DC Mike Dashwood; Terence Bayler, Kate Williams and John Cater guest star	22 December 1992
103	"Return Match"	Derek Lister	Christopher Russell	Guest appearance of DC Mike Dashwood	24 December 1992
104	"High Places"	Jeremy Silberston	Peter J. Hammond	Anna Keaveney and Caroline John guest star	29 December 1992
105	"When Push Comes to Shove"	Matthew Evans	Tony Etchells	—	31 December 1992

=== Series 9 (1993) ===
<onlyinclude>

No. in series	Title	Directed by	Written by	Episode notes	Original release date
1	"A Dying Breed"	Chris Clough	Chris Ould	Title sequence updated; Elizabeth Rider guest stars	5 January 1993
2	"Fact of Life"	Derek Lister	Julian Jones	Tim Matthews guest stars	7 January 1993
3	"All Through the Night"	Jeremy Silberston	John Wilsher	—	8 January 1993
4	"New Tune, Old Fiddle"	Laurence Moody	John Wilsher	First appearance of Ch Insp Philip Cato; Bob Mason guest stars	12 January 1993
5	"Delinquent"	Chris Lovett	Victoria Taylor	Stephanie Turner and Dickon Tolson guest star	14 January 1993
6	"Bringing Up Baby"	Matthew Evans	Edward Canfor-Dumas	Daniel Flynn and Jacqueline Defferary guest star	15 January 1993
7	"Rainy Days and Mondays"	Sarah Anderson	Trevor Wadlow	Zoe Telford guest stars	19 January 1993
8	"Supply and Demand"	Chris Clough	Joanne Maguire	Gareth Armstrong, Richard Beale and Shirin Taylor guest star	21 January 1993
9	"On the Cards"	Jan Sargent	Gregory Evans	Adrienne Burgess and Andrew McCulloch guest star	22 January 1993
10	"Shock to the System"	David Attwood	Christopher Russell	First appearance of Sgt Jane Kendall; Shaun Dingwall and Lisa Coleman guest star	26 January 1993
11	"Living It Down"	David Attwood	Ron Rose	Jane Danson and Melanie Hill guest star	28 January 1993
12	"Heat of the Moment"	Sarah Anderson	Edward Canfor-Dumas	Julie Buckfield guest star	29 January 1993
13	"Shake, Rattle 'N' Roll"	George Case	Susan Shattock	First appearance of PC Mike Jarvis; Marcia Warren and Shaun Scott guest star	2 February 1993
14	"No Thanks to You"	Jan Sargent	Candy Denman	Raymond Llewellyn and Elizabeth Estensen guest star	4 February 1993
15	"A Better Life"	Andrew Higgs	Roy MacGregor	Sean Maguire guest stars	5 February 1993
16	"Echo"	Bill Pryde	Peter Hammond	Adrian Rawlins guest stars	9 February 1993
17	"Fagins"	Brian Farnham	Julian Jones	First appearance of WPC Suzi Croft	11 February 1993
18	"Cried Too Late"	Chris Lovett	Matthew Wingett	Gerda Stevenson guest stars	12 February 1993
19	"Gone for a Soldier"	Brian Farnham	Steve Trafford	Charles De'Ath and Renu Setna guest star	16 February 1993
20	"Persuasion"	Richard Holthouse	Marianne Colbran	Sue Devaney guest stars	18 February 1993
21	"Hard Man"	Andrew Higgs	Carolyn Jones	—	19 February 1993
22	"Missionary Work"	William Brayne	Steve Trafford	Emma Bunton, Simone Hyams, Muriel Pavlow, Fanny Carby and Peter Gunn guest star	23 February 1993
23	"Hypocritical Oath"	Andrew Higgs	Matthew Bardsley	Kenneth Farrington and Anastasia Hille guest star	25 February 1993
24	"Trivial Pursuits"	Brian Parker	Len Collin	Jeremy Bulloch guest stars	26 February 1993
25	"Out of the Mouths"	Graeme Harper	Duncan Gould	Colin Spaull, David Simeon, John Leeson and Nathan Constance guest star	2 March 1993
26	"Keeping In Touch"	George Case	Anthony Valentine	Frank Mills and Daphne Oxenford guest star	4 March 1993
27	"If It Isn't Hurting"	Paul Unwin	Tony Etchells	Madhav Sharma and Wendy Williams guest star	5 March 1993
28	"Keeping Out of Trouble"	Brian Parker	Michael Jenner	First appearance of WDC Jo Morgan	9 March 1993
29	"School of Hard Knocks"	Graeme Harper	Robert Jones	Shirley Stelfox, Ivor Roberts and Nick Brimble guest star	11 March 1993
30	"A Little Family Business"	Michael Simpson	Steve Trafford	Margery Mason guest stars	12 March 1993
31	"Breaking the Chain"	Bill Pryde	Jonathan Myerson	—	16 March 1993
32	"The Fortress"	Bill Pryde	Philip Palmer	—	18 March 1993
33	"In Broad Daylight"	Richard Holthouse	Roy MacGregor	Nick Moran guest stars	19 March 1993
34	"Credible Witness"	Diana Patrick	Joanne Maguire	Hugh Futcher guest stars	23 March 1993
35	"The Price of Fame"	Haldane Duncan	Lizzie Mickery	Georgina Cates and Margot Leicester guest star	25 March 1993
36	"The Short Straw"	William Brayne	Russell Lewis	Final appearance of WDC Viv Martella	26 March 1993
37	"Missing"	Roger Gartland	Christopher Russell	David Hargreaves and Tim Preece guest star	30 March 1993
38	"Goods Received"	Diana Patrick	Julian Spilsbury	Eamon Boland and James Marcus guest star	1 April 1993
39	"Double Enmity"	Paul Unwin	David Hoskins	Paul Moriarty and Connor Byrne guest star	2 April 1993
40	"Hard Evidence"	Laurence Moody	Tony Etchells	Conleth Hill and Ken Bones guest star	6 April 1993
41	"High Hopes And Low Life"	John Darnell	Roy MacGregor	Final appearance of PC Ron Smollett; Peter Benson and Sharon Maiden guest star	8 April 1993
42	"On the Loose"	Laurence Moody	Candy Denman	Michelle Joseph, Allan Surtees and Hilda Fenemore guest star	9 April 1993
43	"Out of Court"	Jim Goddard	Mark Holloway	Jack Smethurst, James Bree and Timothy Walker guest star	13 April 1993
44	"Bedfellows"	Jan Sargent	Christopher Russell	Ace Bhatti and Raji James guest star	15 April 1993
45	"Cat and Mouse"	John Darnell	Sebastian Secker-Walker	Natalie Roles guest stars	17 April 1993
46	"Brothers"	Roger Gartland	Chris Lang	Jake Wood guest stars	20 April 1993
47	"Playing Away"	Ed Braman	Chris Ould	Geraldine Somerville guest stars	22 April 1993
48	"Coming to Terms"	Jeremy Silbertson	Roy MacGregor	Stephen Churchett and Maureen O'Brien guest star	24 April 1993
49	"Return to Sender"	Jeremy Silbertson	Michael Jenner	Andy Serkis and Joseph Kpobie guest star	27 April 1993
50	"Sticks and Stones"	Betsan Morris	David Lane	Tenniel Evans guest stars	29 April 1993
51	"Tangled Webs"	David Attwood	Ron Rose	James Gaddas and Julia Ford guest star	1 May 1993
52	"Recruiting Officer"	Ed Braman	Len Collin	Ray Ashcroft and Ian Burfield guest stars	4 May 1993
53	"Give 'Em An Inch"	Ken Horn	Duncan Gould	Ralph Ineson guest stars	6 May 1993
54	"By Hook or By Crook"	Haldane Duncan	Anthony Valentine	Neil Stuke guest stars	8 May 1993
55	"Home to Roost"	Chris Clough	Julian Spilsbury	Ricky Tomlinson and Gordon Salkilld guest star	11 May 1993
56	"In Safe Hands"	Chris Clough	Steve Trafford	Daniela Denby-Ashe guest stars	13 May 1993
57	"Punch Drunk"	Michael Simpson	Edward Canfor-Dumas	Final regular appearance of DS Ted Roach	15 May 1993
58	"Fall Out"	Anthony Quinn	James Mavor	—	18 May 1993
59	"Away Days"	Laurence Moody	Peter Hammond	Victoria Plucknett and Glyn Houston guest star	20 May 1993
60	"Pride and Joy"	Betsan Evans	Chris Ould	First appearance of DS Danny Pearce; Anne Reid, Matilda Ziegler, Tim Wylton and David Sibley guest star	22 May 1993
61	"Fast Food"	Ian White	Margaret Phelan	Pui Fan Lee, Robert Blythe and Larry Martyn guest star	25 May 1993
62	"Soft Touch"	Anthony Quinn	Robert Jones	Michael Carter guest stars	27 May 1993
63	"We Gave Him All Our Love"	David Attwood	Michael Russell	Polly James and Steven Arnold guest stars	29 May 1993
64	"Hearts and Minds"	Derek Lister	Tony Etchells	—	1 June 1993
65	"Cry Baby"	Derek Lister	Edward Canfor-Dumas	—	3 June 1993
66	"A Willing Victim"	Jim Goddard	Isabelle Grey	Albert Moses, Robert Gwilym, Lee MacDonald and Denise van Outen guest star	5 June 1993
67	"Rank Outsider"	Laurence Moody	Susan Shattock	—	8 June 1993
68	"Tender Mercies"	Ken Horn	Jane Woodrow	Ann Davies guest stars	10 June 1993
69	"Double Take"	Haldane Duncan	Anthony Valentine	Vilma Hollingbery and Peter Miles guest star	12 June 1993
70	"Mouth and Trousers"	Michael Simpson	Len Collin	Final appearance of PC Barry Stringer; Daragh O'Malley guest stars	15 June 1993
71	"Uses and Abuses"	Michael Simpson	Joan Maguire / Geoff McQueen	Charlotte Avery, Souad Faress and Frances Ruffelle guest star	16 June 1993
72	"Picking a Winner"	Haldane Duncan	Michael Jenner	Amanda Abbington guest stars	19 June 1993
73	"Broken"	John Bruce	Roy MacGregor	Brian Glover guest stars	22 June 1993
74	"Insider Dealing"	John Strickland	Julian Spilsbury	Donald Douglas and Philip Martin Brown guest star	24 June 1993
75	"To Have and To Hold"	Sarah Anderson	Edward Canfor-Dumas	Alex Kingston guest stars	26 June 1993
76	"Honour Among Thieves"	John Strickland	Joanne Maguire	Trevor Peacock guest stars	29 June 1993
77	"Somebody to Love"	Ian White	Marianne Colbran	Victoria Alcock, Jimmy Yuill and Jo Kendall guest star	1 July 1993
78	"Morning Has Broken"	Sarah Anderson	Gregory Evans	WDC Jo Morgan is promoted to WDS; Michael Elwyn guest stars	3 July 1993
79	"Swaps"	Laurence Moody	Duncan Gould	Gabrielle Blunt and Tony Aitken guest star	6 July 1993
80	"Trust"	Aisling Walsh	Marianne Colbran	Bronagh Gallagher and Lee Ross guest star	8 July 1993
81	"Divided We Fall"	James Cellan Jones	Ron Rose	Caroline John guest stars	10 July 1993
82	"A Duty of Care"	Indra Bhose	Philip Palmer	Richard Moore guest stars	13 July 1993
83	"Family Values"	Graham Theakston	James Stevenson	Tilly Vosburgh guest stars	15 July 1993
84	"A Matter of Life and Death"	Aisling Walsh	Christopher Long	Final appearance of Sgt John Maitland; Peter Gilmore guest stars	17 July 1993
85	"Kith and Kin"	Indra Bhose	Isabelle Grey	First appearance of Sgt Ray Steele; Oscar James guest stars	20 July 1993
86	"Part of the Family"	Michael Offer	Clive Hopkins	Lolita Chakrabarti and Nadim Sawalha guest star	22 July 1993
87	"Mighty Atoms"	Alex Kirby	Neil Clarke	Jonny Lee Miller guest stars	24 July 1993
88	"A Malicious Prosecution"	James Cellan Jones	Julian Jones	Timothy Walker guest stars	27 July 1993
89	"Outbreak"	Michael Offer	Stephen C. Handley	Joanna Hole and Trevor Byfield guest star	27 July 1993
90	"Unreliable Witness"	Chris Lovett	Steve Griffiths	Eddie Marsan and Patsy Palmer guest star	31 July 1993
91	"Sweet Charity"	Chris Clough	Len Collin	Stuart Organ guest stars	3 August 1993
92	"David and Goliath"	Chris Lovett	Duncan Gould	Natasha Pyne guest stars	5 August 1993
93	"What a Pair"	John Bruce	Lizzie Mickery	Marjorie Yates guest stars	7 August 1993
94	"Desirable Property"	John Bruce	Mark Holloway	—	10 August 1993
95	"Blind Spot"	Matthew Evans	Roger Davenport	John Simm guest stars	12 August 1993
96	"Carrying the Load"	Matthew Evans	Michael Jenner	Tony Haygarth guest stars	14 August 1993
97	"Deadly Weapon"	Haldane Duncan	Graham Harvey	Alex Walkinshaw and Dave Atkins guest star	17 August 1993
98	"All the Wrong Connections"	Haldane Duncan	Roy MacGregor	Stephen Greif guest stars	19 August 1993
99	"Give and Take"	John Strickland	Elizabeth-Anne Wheal	Jaye Griffiths and Catherine Tate guest star	21 August 1993
100	"Desperate Measures"	Sue Dunderdale	Candy Denman	Gordon Warnecke guest stars	24 August 1993
101	"To Catch a Thief"	Sue Dunderdale	Lyndon Mallett	Robert Ashby, Peter Armitage and JoAnne Good guest star	26 August 1993
102	"Natural Reaction"	Michael Simpson	Tom Needham	Jane Slavin guest stars	28 August 1993
103	"Desperate Remedies"	Andrew Higgs	Barry Simner	Paul Angelis, Linda Henry and Gerry Cowper guest star	31 August 1993
104	"Bright Lights"	Michael Simpson	Peter Hammond	George Rossi guest stars	2 September 1993
105	"Bare Faced Lies"	Alex Kirby	Lizzi Mickery	Final regular appearance DI Frank Burnside; Tracie Bennett and Carol Harrison guest star	4 September 1993
106	"But Not Forgotten"	David Attwood	Russell Lewis	Brian Capron guest stars	7 September 1993
107	"Push"	John Strickland	Mark Holloway	Lucy Speed and Edna Doré guest star	9 September 1993
108	"Bad Reaction"	Moira Armstrong	Joanne Maguire	First appearance of DI Harry Haines	11 September 1993
109	"Compliments of the Service"	Derek Lister	Anthony Valentine	Nigel Humphreys guest stars	14 September 1993
110	"Game of Two Halves"	Andrew Higgs	Robert Jones	—	16 September 1993
111	"The Knowledge"	Chris Clough	Michael Russell	Bill Stewart, Jimmi Harkishin and Daniel Abineri guest star	18 September 1993
112	"No Place Like Home"	Graham Theakston	Tony Etchells	Final appearance of Sgt Jane Kendall	21 September 1993
113	"Customer Care"	Derek Lister	Trevor Wadlow	—	23 September 1993
114	"The Right Man for the Job"	Jeremy Silbertson	Chris Ould	Joe Absolom, Count Prince Miller and Anthony Jackson guest star	25 September 1993
115	"A Life in the Day Of"	Moira Armstrong	Edward Canfor-Dumas	Kate Maravan guest stars	28 September 1993
116	"Having What It Takes"	Gill Wilkinson	Isabelle Grey	Diane Langton guest stars.	30 September 1993
117	"Play the Game"	Aisling Walsh	Philip Palmer	Barry Stanton and Aidan Gillen guest star	2 October 1993
118	"Unlucky For Some"	David Attwood	Julian Spilsbury	Danny Dyer, Maggie Cronin and Helen Blatch guest star	5 October 1993
119	"Gift of the Gab"	Ted Clisby	Anthony Valentine	Dermot Crowley guest stars	7 October 1993
120	"A Class Act"	Jeremy Woolf	Trevor Wadlow	Marc Warren guest stars	9 October 1993
121	"Dangerous Trade"	Jeremy Woolf	Graham Harvey	—	12 October 1993
122	"Cheating Heart"	Nicholas Mallett	Scott Cherry	Amelda Brown, Christopher Blake and Bobby Knutt guest star	14 October 1993
123	"Somewhere To Hang My Hat"	Ted Clisby	Neil Clarke	Jean Heywood guest stars	16 October 1993
124	"No Comment"	Jeremy Silberston	Christopher Russell	Adam Blackwood guest stars	19 October 1993
125	"Shrinkage"	Nicholas Mallett	Duncan Gould	Berwick Kaler, Vincent Regan, Martin Hancock, David Schaal and Ben Nealon guest star	21 October 1993
126	"Street Legal"	Chris Lovett	James Stevenson	Mark Letheren guest stars	23 October 1993
127	"The Green Eyed Monster"	Laura Sims	Chris Lang	Billy Hartman guest stars	26 October 1993
128	"Behind Closed Doors"	Gill Wilkinson	Sebastian Secker-Walker	Pal Aron guest stars	28 October 1993
129	"Links in the Chain"	Laura Sims	Duncan Gould	Andrew Burt guest stars	30 October 1993
130	"Care in the Community"	Chris Lovett	Jane Hollowood	Roberta Taylor, Geoffrey Hutchings, Barry Andrews and David Quilter guest star	2 November 1993
131	"You Don't Always Get What You Want"	Chris Clough	Stephen C. Handley	—	4 November 1993
132	"Reason To Believe"	Ian White	Joanne Maguire	Billy Hartman guest stars	6 November 1993
133	"Let Slip"	Riitta Leena Lynn	Lyndon Mallet	—	9 November 1993
134	"Until Proven Guilty"	Derek Lister	Sebastian Secker Walker	Tony Caunter guest stars	11 November 1993
135	"The Hard Sell"	Derek Lister	Michael Jenner	—	13 November 1993
136	"Consequences"	Riitta Leena Lynn	Marianne Colbran	Tony Guilfoyle and Cheryl Hall guest star	16 November 1993
137	"A Question of Identity"	Ian White	David Lane	—	18 November 1993
138	"Cutting Edge"	Michael Simpson	Terry Hodgkinson	Derek Newark and Godfrey James guest star	20 November 1993
139	"Put Down"	Michael Simpson	Edward Canfor-Dumas	Jeillo Edwards guest stars	23 November 1993
140	"Left Behind"	Frank W. Smith	Judith Johnson	Albert Welling guest stars	25 November 1993
141	"Real Villains"	Chris Clough	Gregory Evans	Dean Gaffney guest stars	27 November 1993
142	"Questionable Judgement"	Paul Unwin	Candy Denman	Camilla Power, Martin Fisk and David Quilter guest star	30 November 1993
143	"Taking Care of Business"	Christopher Hodson	Steve Griffiths	—	2 December 1993
144	"The Law in Their Hands"	Graeme Harper	Len Collin	Richard Davies guest stars	4 December 1993
145	"Cause For Complaint"	Frank W. Smith	Edwin Pearce	—	7 December 1993
146	"Blood Counts"	Paul Unwin	Andy Garrett	Paul Barber guest stars	9 December 1993
147	"Hurting Inside"	Peter Cattaneo	Harry Duffin	Oliver Smith guest stars	11 December 1993
148	"Corroboration"	John Bruce	Margaret Phelan	Kevork Malikyan guest stars	14 December 1993
149	"Death of a Ladies' Man"	Chris Lovett	Marianne Colbran	—	16 December 1993
150	"An Ill Wind"	Laurence Moody	Graham Harvey	Sally Knyvette guest stars	18 December 1993
151	"Keep on Trucking"	Graeme Harper	Duncan Gould	Russell Floyd guest stars	21 December 1993
152	"A Family Trait"	Aisling Walsh	Candy Denman	—	23 December 1993
153	"Paid in Full"	John Bruce	Elizabeth-Anne Wheal	Arthur Cox and Sophie Stanton guest star	24 December 1993
154	"Cause for Concern"	Christopher Hodson	Julian Spilsbury	Dean Harris and Ray Armstrong guest star	28 December 1993
155	"Nothing Ventured"	Nick Laughland	Edward Canfor-Dumas	Final regular appearance of DI Harry Haines; Nick Miles and Donald Sumpter guest star	31 December 1993

=== Series 10 (1994) ===
No. in series	Title	Directed by	Written by	Episode notes	Original release date
1	"Games"	Andrew Higgs	Len Collin	David Bamber and June Page guest star	4 January 1994
2	"Second Sight"	David Attwood	Elizabeth-Ann Wheal	First regular appearance of DI Sally Johnson; Michael Byrne guest stars	6 January 1994
3	"Darkness Before Dawn"	Nick Laughland	Sebastian Secker Walker	Sophie Okonedo, Douglas Henshall and David Quilter guest star	7 January 1994
4	"He Who Waits"	Douglas MacKinnon	Neil Clarke	First appearance of DC Rod Skase; Sally George guest stars	11 January 1994
5	"Mix and Match"	Charles Beeson	Chris Ould	—	13 January 1994
6	"Dealer Wins"	Charles Beeson	Duncan Gould	—	14 January 1994
7	"No Job For An Amateur"	Rittaa Leena Lynn	Candy Denman	First appearance of PC Adam Bostock; Julie Hesmondhalgh guest stars	18 January 1994
8	"Judge and Jury"	Bill Pryde	James Stevenson	Susan Fleetwood and David Horovitch guest star	20 January 1994
9	"The Mourning After"	Chris Lovett	Mark Holloway	Jo Stone-Fewings and Dido Miles guest star	21 January 1994
10	"Just Say No"	Jan Sargent	Nigel Baldwin	Tim Preece guest stars	25 January 1994
11	"Mud Sticks"	Peter Cattaneo	Isabelle Grey	—	27 January 1994
12	"One Bad Turn"	Laurence Moody	Anthony Valentine	Nicholas Bailey guest stars	29 January 1994
13	"Faith in the System"	Bill Pryde	Matthew Wingett	Russell Boulter guest stars	1 February 1994
14	"Keeping Mum"	Michael Simpson	Lizzie Mickery	Kevin Doyle and Annie Hulley guest star	3 February 1994
15	"Double Vision"	Chris Clough	Neil Clark	Fanny Carby guest stars	4 February 1994
16	"No Access"	Riitta Leena Lynn	Isabelle Grey	David Neilson and Rene Zagger guest star	8 February 1994
17	"Ways and Means"	Jan Sargent	Jane Woodrow	Paul Jerricho and Perry Fenwick guest star	10 February 1994
18	"Cutting It"	Brian Parker	Michael Jenner	—	11 February 1994
19	"Secrets"	Douglas MacKinnon	Neil McKay	Dicken Ashworth and David Haig guest star	15 February 1994
20	"Bin-Men"	Ian White	Roger Davenport	Lloyd McGuire guest stars	17 February 1994
21	"Ducking and Diving"	Chris Clough	Barry Purchese	Alan Ford and Debbie Linden guest star	18 February 1994
22	"Gone Away"	Ian White	Isabelle Grey	Daniela Denby-Ashe guest stars	22 February 1994
23	"Dead Men Don't Drive Cars"	John Bruce	Rob Gittins	Lizzie Mickery guest stars	24 February 1994
24	"Saturday Night's All Right"	John Bruce	Len Collin	Charles De'Ath guest stars	25 February 1994
25	"Ranks and Files"	Derek Lister	Edward Canfor-Dumas	Nicholas Donnelly guest stars	1 March 1994
26	"Business as Usual"	Indra Bhose	Philip Palmer	—	3 March 1994
27	"Root of All Evil"	Indra Bhose	Joanne Maguire	Paul Putner and Roy Heather guest star	4 March 1994
28	"Man to Man"	Derek Lister	Trevor Wadlow	Steven Hartley guest stars	8 March 1994
29	"Menace"	Brian Parker	Tom Needham	Michael Keating guest stars	10 March 1994
30	"Killjoys"	Laurence Moody	Gregory Evans	—	11 March 1994
31	"One of Them"	Nick Laughland	Chris Lang	David Quilter and John McArdle guest star	15 March 1994
32	"Day of Reckoning"	Diana Patrick	Julian Spilsbury	Zienia Merton, Connor McIntyre and Harry Van Gorkum guest star	17 March 1994
33	"Sleeping with the Fishes"	Laurence Moody	Julian Jones	Geoffrey McGivern guest stars	18 March 1994
34	"Fair Exchange"	Diana Patrick	Chris Lang	—	22 March 1994
35	"Last Rights"	Nick Laughland	Candy Denman	Philip McGough guest stars	24 March 1994
36	"Mean Streak"	Michael Offer	James Stevenson	—	25 March 1994
37	"Pig in the Middle"	Carol Wilks	Jonathan Myerson	Idris Elba and Jennie Stoller guest star	29 March 1994
38	"House Arrest"	Carol Wilks	Barry Simner	Georgina Cates guest stars	31 March 1994
39	"Clubbing Together"	Brian Farnham	Sebastian Secker Walker	George Irving guest stars	1 April 1994
40	"Pals"	Aisling Walsh	Mark Holloway	David Gwillim guest stars	5 April 1994
41	"Sold Out"	Michael Offer	Stephen C. Handley	Shirin Taylor guest stars	7 April 1994
42	"Last Orders"	Chris Lovett	Michael Jenner	—	8 April 1994
43	"All the Comforts of Home"	Aisling Walsh	Lyndon Mallet	Brian Miller, Sorcha Cusack and Philip Glenister guest star	12 April 1994
44	"Wild Justice"	Graeme Harper	Nigel Baldwin	Sarah Alexander and Colin Spaull guest star	14 April 1994
45	"Give Away"	Brian Farnham	Len Collin	—	15 April 1994
46	"Nowhere to Run"	Chris Lovett	Simon Frith	Charlotte Bellamy and John Moreno guest star	19 April 1994
47	"Final Straw"	Gwennan Sage	Tom Needham	—	21 April 1994
48	"Bodyguard of Lies"	Gwennan Sage	Elizabeth-Anne Wheal	Ron Cook and David Quilter guest star	22 April 1994
49	"Friends Like That"	Roger Gartland	Tony Etchells	—	26 April 1994
50	"Disclosures"	Graeme Harper	Carolyn Sally Jones	Ian Redford, Dominic Jephcott and Patrick Godfrey guest star	28 April 1994
51	"Big Eagle Day"	A J Quinn	Terry Hodgkinson	Danny Webb and Patrick Murray guest star	29 April 1994
52	"Bottleneck"	David Richards	J. C. Wilsher	Ginny Holder guest stars	3 May 1994
53	"Honour and Obey"	Roger Gartland	Lizzie Mickery	—	5 May 1994
54	"Hot Off the Press"	A J Quinn	Edwin Pearce	Clive Merrison and David Hargreaves guest star	6 May 1994
55	"Killing Time"	Jeremy Silberston	Mark Holloway	Thomas Craig and Lesley Nicol guest star	10 May 1994
56	"Butter Wouldn't Melt"	David Richards	Neil Clarke	Pete Lee-Wilson and Joanna Monro guest stars	12 May 1994
57	"All Things Nice"	David Attwood	Ron Rose	—	13 May 1994
58	"No Way to Treat a Lady"	Ian White	Scott Cherry	—	17 May 1994
59	"The Price"	Jeremy Silberston	Roy MacGregor	—	19 May 1994
60	"Old Scores"	Ian White	David Hoskins	Trevor Byfield guest stars	20 May 1994
61	"Branded"	David Attwood	Barry Simner	—	24 May 1994
62	"Good Friends"	June Howson	Marianne Colbran	Alan Westaway guest stars	26 May 1994
63	"RTA"	Douglas Mackinnon	Philip Palmer	—	27 May 1994
64	"No Marks"	June Howson	Robert Jones	Frank Mills guest stars	31 May 1994
65	"Sweetness and Light"	David Attwood	Ron Rose	Kenneth Farrington guest stars	2 June 1994
66	"Hey Diddle Diddle"	Nick Laughland	Gerry Huxham	Rebecca Lacey and David Meyer guest star	3 June 1994
67	"Funny Money"	Graham Dixon	Duncan Gould	—	7 June 1994
68	"Till Death Do Us Part"	Chris Clough	Harry Duffin	Colin Buchanan guest stars	9 June 1994
69	"All Along the Watchtower"	Sue Dunderdale	Stephen C. Handley	Michele Austin guest stars	10 June 1994
70	"Snowblind"	Douglas Mackinnon	Steve Griffiths	—	14 June 1994
71	"Lesson to be Learned"	Andrew Higgs	Roy Mitchell	Sally Rogers, Louis Mahoney and Dominic Guard guest star	16 June 1994
72	"Dear John"	Brian Farnham	Lyndon Mallet	—	17 June 1994
73	"Within Limits"	Christopher Hodson	Brian B. Thompson	—	21 June 1994
74	"Tails You Lose"	Christopher Hodson	Maxwell Young	—	23 June 1994
75	"Gate Fever"	Jim Goddard	Isabelle Grey	David Gwillim and George Sewell guest star	24 June 1994
76	"The Road Not Taken"	Jim Goddard	Ron Rose	—	28 June 1994
77	"Fallen Angel"	Graham Dixon	Rob Gittins	Barrie Gosney and Hywel Simons guest star	30 June 1994
78	"A Touch of Braid"	Frank Smith	Edwin Pearce	Ged Simmons guest stars	1 July 1994
79	"Masquerade"	Frank Smith	Julian Spilsbury	Rio Fanning guest stars	5 July 1994
80	"Good Days"	Michael Simpson	Peter J. Hammond	Liz Fraser, Renu Setna and Frank Jarvis guest star	7 July 1994
81	"Banned"	Sam Miller	Michael Baker	Trevor Cooper guest stars	8 July 1994
82	"Parental Guidance"	Chris Lovett	Richard Stoneman	—	12 July 1994
83	"Settling the Score"	Baz Taylor	Tom Needham	—	14 July 1994
84	"High Drivers"	Sam Miller	Nigel Baldwin	Charlie Condou guest stars	15 July 1994
85	"Personal Space"	Moira Armstrong	Carolyn Sally Jones	WPC Suzi Croft is promoted to WDC; Ashley Jensen and Peter-Hugo Daly guest star	19 July 1994
86	"Public Spirit"	Sue Dunderdale	Simon Frith	Paul Copley guest stars	21 July 1994
87	"Dirty Laundry"	Moira Armstrong	Elizabeth-Anne Wheal	—	22 July 1994
88	"Paying the Price"	John Bruce	Robert Jones	—	26 July 1994
89	"Best Interests"	Brian Farnham	James Stevenson	Robert Gwilym guest stars	28 July 1994
90	"Easy Prey"	Baz Taylor	Mark Holloway	—	29 July 1994
91	"Unfinished Business"	Jeremy Silberston	David Hoskins	First appearance of DS Chris Deakin	2 August 1994
92	"War of Nerves"	Danny Hiller	Edwin Pearce	Billy McColl guest stars	4 August 1994
93	"Legacy"	Laurence Moody	Chris Ould	Hubert Rees, Shaun Williamson and Eamon Boland guest star	5 August 1994
94	"Death and Taxes"	David Yates	Jonathan Myerson	John Duttine guest stars	9 August 1994
95	"In Too Deep"	Nicholas Mallett	Roy MacGregor	—	11 August 1994
96	"You Belong to Me"	Jeremy Silberston	Marianne Colbran	Dearbhla Molloy guest stars	12 August 1994
97	"Looking for Mr Right"	Danny Hiller	Barry Simner	—	16 August 1994
98	"Skinning Cats"	Nicholas Mallett	Duncan Gould	—	18 August 1994
99	"Full Contact"	David Yates	Steve Griffiths	Adrienne Posta guest stars	19 August 1994
100	"Partners"	John Bruce	Simon Moss	Gerry Cowper guest stars	23 August 1994
101	"On the Latch"	Gill Wilkinson	Michael Jenner	Shaun Dingwall guest stars	25 August 1994
102	"Wall of Silence"	Gill Wilkinson	David Hoskins	Michael Melia guest stars	26 August 1994
103	"Business Opportunities"	Dominic Allan	Isabelle Grey	John Rolfe guest stars	30 August 1994
104	"A Little Learning"	Chris Lovett	Michael Jenner	Anna Wilson-Jones guest stars	1 September 1994
105	"Right Way, Wrong Way"	Simon Meyers	Nigel Baldwin	Larrington Walker and Pik-Sen Lim guest star	2 September 1994
106	"Instant Response"	Nicholas Laughland	Joanne Maguire	Final appearance of PC Adam Bostock	6 September 1994
107	"Washback"	Chris Clough	A. Valentine	—	8 September 1994
108	"Kickback"	Laurence Moody	A. Valentine	David Gwillim guest stars	9 September 1994
109	"Birthright"	Aisling Walsh	Peter J. Hammond	Deborah Manship guest stars	13 September 1994
110	"Threats and Promises"	Michael Simpson	Gregory Evans	—	15 September 1994
111	"Inside"	Gwennan Sage	Mark Holloway	—	16 September 1994
112	"Back on the Chain Gang"	Laura Sims	Stephen C. Handley	—	20 September 1994
113	"Out in the Cold"	Gwennan Sage	David G. McDonagh	Jacqueline Defferary guest stars	22 September 1994
114	"Living Legend"	Brian Farnham	Helen Leadbeater	Georgina Hale, Derek Martin, Johnnie Wade, Neil Stuke and John Gill guest star	23 September 1994
115	"Runners and Riders"	June Howson	Michael Jenner	Victoria Alcock guest stars	27 September 1994
116	"Down and Out"	Laura Sims	Simon Frith	Ewen Bremner guest stars	29 September 1994
117	"Inquest"	Brian Farnham	Margaret Phelan	TBA	30 September 1994
118	"Grey Matter"	Aisling Walsh	Edward Canfor-Dumas	Bruce Byron and Madhav Sharma guest star	4 October 1994
119	"Blackout"	Simon Meyers	Roger Davenport	Malcolm Terris, Mark Heap, Sean Caffrey and Peter Benson guest star	6 October 1994
120	"The Cold Consumer"	Douglas Mackinnon	Terry Hodgkinson	—	7 October 1994
121	"Saving Face"	Dominic Allan	Scott Cherry	Stacey Tendeter guest stars	11 October 1994
122	"Silent Partner"	Indra Bhose	Isabelle Grey	Peter Copley guest stars	13 October 1994
123	"One Born Every Minute"	Jeremy Silberston	Tom Needham	Campbell Morrison guest stars	14 October 1994
124	"Backlash"	Chris Clough	A. Valentine	Hour-long 10th anniversary special; Danny John-Jules and Allan Corduner guest star	18 October 1994
125	"Taken on Trust"	Tony Virgo	Julian Spilsbury	—	20 October 1994
126	"Bridgework"	Michael Simpson	Elizabeth-Anne Wheal	David Lonsdale guest stars	21 October 1994
127	"Land of the Blind"	John Bruce	Sebastian Secker-Walker	Claire Benedict and Russell Brand guest star	25 October 1994
128	"Indecent Exposure"	John Bruce	Elizabeth-Anne Wheal	Nadia Sawalha guest stars	27 October 1994
129	"Pass the Parcel"	Alan Bell	Chris Ould	—	28 October 1994
130	"Cheap at Half the Price"	Christopher Hodson	Chris Lang	—	1 November 1994
131	"The Sixth Age"	June Howson	Ron Rose	Helen Fraser and Diana Coupland guest stars	3 November 1994
132	"Pipped at the Post"	Christopher Hodson	Robert Jones	—	4 November 1994
133	"Mischief"	Gill Wilkinson	Peter J. Hammond	—	8 November 1994
134	"Taking Stock"	Tony Virgo	Marianne Colbran	Final regular appearance of WDS Jo Morgan; Sarah Parish and Maureen O'Farrell guest star	10 November 1994
135	"The Melting Pot"	Sam Miller	Christopher Russell	Ch Insp Derek Conway is promoted to A/Supt; Oscar James guest stars	11 November 1994
136	"No Name, No Number"	Indra Bhose	Jonathan Myerson	Forbes Collins and Anthony Jackson guest star	15 November 1994
137	"Make Believe"	David Attwood	Michael Jenner	—	17 November 1994
138	"Sleeping Dogs"	Audrey Cooke	Maxwell Young	—	18 November 1994
139	"Beg, Borrow or Steal"	Gill Wilkinson	Edwin Pearce	John Abineri guest stars	22 November 1994
140	"Work Experience"	Chris Lovett	Barry Simner	Richard Mylan guest stars	24 November 1994
141	"Down a Blind Alley"	Alan Bell	Roy MacGregor	David Quilter guest stars	25 November 1994
142	"Creating a Market"	Douglas Mackinnon	Candy Denman	—	29 November 1994
143	"Fly on the Wall"	Audrey Cooke	Rob Gittins	Catherine Tate guest stars	1 December 1994
144	"King of the Hill"	Simon Meyers	Chris Ould	Joe Absolom guest stars	2 December 1994
145	"Fathers and Sons"	Brian Parker	Gregory Evans	Richard Beale and Bruce Alexander guest star	6 December 1994
146	"A Feeling for the Job"	Keith Boak	Tom Needham	Freddie Earlle guest stars	8 December 1994
147	"Closing Time"	Chris Lovett	Mark Holloway	—	9 December 1994
148	"Blood Pressure"	David Attwood	Richard Stoneman	Angela Lonsdale, Jack Smethurst and Martin Hancock guest star	13 December 1994
149	"Appropriate Adults"	Martin Hutchings	Barry Simner	—	15 December 1994
150	"Throw the Key Away"	Sam Miller	Neil Clarke	—	16 December 1994
151	"An Unconventional Approach"	Frank W. Smith	Dom Shaw	Ann Davies guest stars	20 December 1994
152	"Fall Guy"	Simon Meyers	James Stevenson	—	22 December 1994
153	"Stuffed"	Christopher Hodson	Mark Holloway	Ray Ashcroft guest stars	23 December 1994
154	"Dearly Departed"	Alan Bell	David G. McDonagh	Ian Puleston-Davies and Ralph Watson guest star	27 December 1994
155	"Returning the Call"	Frank W. Smith	Richard Stoneman	Jake Wood guest stars	29 December 1994
156	"Licensed to Kill"	Jan Sargent	Roy MacGregor	Pooky Quesnel guest stars	30 December 1994

=== Series 11 (1995) ===
No. in series	Title	Directed by	Written by	Episode notes	Original release date
1	"To Crack a Nut"	Nicholas Mallett	Chris Lang	Sheila Ruskin and Sarah-Jane Potts guest star	5 January 1995
2	"Hot Stuff"	Robin Sheppard	Candy Denman	Guest appearance of Harry Haines	6 January 1995
3	"Hit and Miss"	Robin Sheppard	Jo O'Keefe	Ian Cullen and Mark Benton guest star	10 January 1995
4	"Hard Cases"	Martin Hutchings	Katharine Way	Rob Edwards and Jane Hazlegrove guest star	12 January 1995
5	"The Protection Racket"	Nicholas Mallett	Edwin Pearce	—	13 January 1995
6	"Crossfire"	Laurence Moody	Fred Kerins	Clara Salaman guest stars	17 January 1995
7	"Little Boy Lost"	Keith Boak	Scott Cherry	Melanie Walters guest star	19 January 1995
8	"Hard Knocks"	Brian Parker	Elizabeth Anne-Wheal	—	20 January 1995
9	"New Management"	Jeremy Silberston	Steve Griffiths	—	24 January 1995
10	"Powerless"	Paul Unwin	John Harding	Robert Pugh, Maureen Beattie and Daniela Denby-Ashe guest star	26 January 1995
11	"Done Is Done"	Alan Bell	Chris Ould	Final regular appearance of DI Sally Johnson; Sean Gilder guest stars	27 January 1995
12	"Getting Even"	David Skynner	Steve Griffiths	DS Chris Deakin is promoted to Acting DI; Terence Beesley guest stars	31 January 1995
13	"Taking the Blame"	Haldane Duncan	Matthew Wingett	—	2 February 1995
14	"Expert Witness"	Alan Bell	Simon Frith	First appearance of DS Don Beech; Debra Gillett guest stars	3 February 1995
15	"Just Another Caution"	Jonathan Dent	Bob Eaton	—	7 February 1995
16	"Uncle Bob"	Derek Lister	Scott Cherry	June Page, Oliver Smith and Jeffery Kissoon guest star	9 February 1995
17	"Street Life"	Paul Unwin	Rory MacGregor	Sara Stockbridge, Jeffery Kissoon and Michael Troughton guest star	10 February 1995
18	"A Fighting Chance"	Laurence Moody	Kevin Scouler	Ivan Kaye guest stars	14 February 1995
19	"Going Home"	Gill Wilkinson	Terry Hodgkinson	Michael Mellinger guest stars	14 February 1995
20	"High Score"	David Skynner	Jim Hawkins	Nicholas Murchie guest stars	17 February 1995
21	"Throwback"	Gill Wilkinson	Peter J. Hammond	Hazel Douglas guest stars	23 February 1995
22	"Eyes and Ears"	Peter Barber-Fleming	Michael Jenner	Ian Bartholomew guest stars	24 February 1995
23	"Good Housekeeping"	Tom Cotter	J. C. Wilsher	Jenny McCracken guest stars	28 February 1995
24	"Is That the Time?"	Tom Cotter	Steve Griffiths	Final appearance of Ch Insp Philip Cato; Geoffrey Beevers and Robert Daws guest star	3 March 1995
25	"New Moves"	Chris Clough	Neil Clarke	First appearances of PCs Nick Slater and Debbie Keane; John McArdle and Stuart Organ guest star	7 March 1995
26	"Flora and Fauna"	Haldane Duncan	Simon Moss	Alex Walkinshaw guest star	9 March 1995
27	"Loose Cannon"	Simon Meyers	Elizabeth Anne-Wheal	—	10 March 1995
28	"Count to Ten"	Christopher Hodson	David Hoskins	—	14 March 1995
29	"Alone"	Jan Sargeant	Jonathan Myerson	Niall Buggy and Terry Molloy guest star	17 March 1995
30	"Quits"	Keith Boak	Rory MacGregor	Ian Liston guest stars	21 March 1995
31	"Stopping Time"	Jonathan Dent	Duncan Gould	Penelope Nice and Paul Putner guest star	23 March 1995
32	"Value for Money"	Peter Barber-Fleming	Maxwell Young	Dominic Brunt guest stars	24 March 1995
33	"Little Green Apples"	Nicholas Laughland	Robert Jones	First appearance of Ch Insp Paul Stritch; Timothy Bateson and Jonathan Kydd guest star	28 March 1995
34	"Never Too Young"	Chris Lovett	Jonathan Myerson	Carol Harrison guest stars	30 March 1995
35	"Lost and Found"	Keith Boak	Suj Ahmed	Vincenzo Pellegrino, John Fraser and Renu Setna guest star	31 March 1995
36	"Hair Trigger"	Derek Lister	Tom Needham	—	4 April 1995
37	"Learning Curve"	Carol Wiseman	Barry Simner	David Schofield, Trevor Cooper and Eric Mason guest star	7 April 1995
38	"Not Just For Christmas"	Chris Lovett	Julian Spilsbury	Basil Moss and Cliff Parisi guest star	11 April 1995
39	"Swan Song"	Pip Broughton	Lyndon Mallet	Keira Knightley, Pat Roach, Gordon Warnecke and Lois Baxter guest star	13 April 1995
40	"In on the Game"	Pip Broughton	Sebastian Secker-Walker	Title sequence updated; Alex Kingston and Andrew Burt guest star	14 April 1995
41	"Your Witness"	Simon Meyers	David Hoskins	—	18 April 1995
42	"Life's a Bitch"	David Yates	Chris Ould	Philip Martin Brown guest stars	21 April 1995
43	"Old Habitats"	Laurence Moody	Neil Clarke	Luisa Bradshaw-White and Linda Bassett guest star	25 April 1995
44	"Baby Face"	Gwennan Sage	Edwin Pearce	Shaun Curry guest stars	27 April 1995
45	"Deeds of Mercy"	Brian Parker	J. C. Wilsher	DS Chris Deakin is promoted to DI; Carl Forgione guest stars	28 April 1995
46	"Damage"	Audrey Cooke	Peter J. Hammond	—	2 May 1995
47	"When Opportunity Knocks"	Laurence Moody	David G. McDonagh	—	4 May 1995
48	"Have a Go Hero"	Sarah Harding	Len Collin	Mark Lambert and Julie Peasgood guest star	5 May 1995
49	"Memorial"	Laurence Moody	Neil Clarke	—	9 May 1995
50	"Good Intentions"	Chris Clough	David Ansdell	Annie Hulley and Robert Glenister guest star	11 May 1995
51	"Losing Streak"	Martin Hutchings	Edwin Pearce	Jason Watkins guest stars	12 May 1995
52	"In the Midnight Hour"	Carol Wiseman	Steve Handley	Gawn Grainger, Karen Westwood and Angela Pleasence guest star	16 May 1995
53	"Never Forget a Face"	Mike Cocker	Simon Frith	Nick Patrick guest stars	18 May 1995
54	"A Quiet Night In"	Nicholas Laughland	Richard Stoneman	Emma Cunniffe, Kay Stonham, David Daker, Jo Kendall and Shirley Stelfox guest star	19 May 1995
55	"Looking After Your Own"	Mike Cocker	Richard Stoneman	Jez Butterworth guest stars	23 May 1995
56	"Four Walls"	Dominic Lees	Stephen Plaice	Robin Soans and Mary Healey guest star	25 May 1995
57	"O.T.S."	Nicholas Laughland	David Hoskins	Connie Hyde guest stars	26 May 1995
58	"Unfamiliar Territory"	Laurence Moody	Simon Moss	Stephen Frost guest stars	30 May 1995
59	"Feeling Guilty"	David Yates	Tim Hyndman	Paul Jesson and Charlie Creed-Miles guest star	1 June 1995
60	"See No Evil"	Douglas Mackinnon	Steve Griffiths	Daniel Ryan guest stars	2 June 1995
61	"Looking For Justice"	Nicholas Laughland	Roy MacGregor	Dean Harris and Peter Guinness guest star	6 June 1995
62	"Other Voices"	Brian Parker	Elizabeth Anne-Wheal	Benjamin Whitrow and Maureen O'Brien guest star	8 June 1995
63	"Water Wings"	Chris Clough	Michael Jenner	Andrew McCulloch guest stars	9 June 1995
64	"They All Look the Same"	Audrey Cooke	Maxwell Young	Tyler Butterworth guest stars	13 June 1995
65	"Trying It On"	Sarah Harding	Gregory Evans	David Horovitch guest stars	15 June 1995
66	"Better Off Dead"	Dominic Lees	Candy Denman	—	16 June 1995
67	"Today and Tomorrow"	Gill Wilkinson	Sheila Duncan	Ross McCall and Mark Letheren guest star	20 June 1995
68	"Upstairs, Downstairs"	A.J. Quinn	Barry Simner	Razaaq Adoti guest stars	22 June 1995
69	"Bedside Manner"	John Bruce	Carolyn Sally Jones	Carol Hawkins guest stars	23 June 1995
70	"Who Cares?"	Martin Hutchings	Mark Holloway	Maurice Denham and Kenneth Colley guest star	27 June 1995
71	"Kicking"	Gwennan Sage	Mark Holloway	Rosie Marcel and David Harewood guest star	29 June 1995
72	"Big Hitters"	Peter Barber-Fleming	Neil Clarke	Dicken Ashworth guest stars	30 June 1995
73	"Picking up the Pieces"	Ken Horn	Nicholas McInerny	Trevor Byfield and Roy Heather guest star	4 July 1995
74	"Big Boy's Rules"	Peter Barber-Fleming	Julian Spilsbury	David Graham and Jeff Nuttall guest star	6 July 1995
75	"Woman of Substance"	Ken Horn	Peter Gibbs	Tony Guilfoyle and Ruth Gemmell guest star	7 July 1995
76	"With Friends Like These"	Paul Unwin	Maxwell Young	Mark Addy guest stars	11 July 1995
77	"No Choice"	Paul Unwin	Tom Needham	Michelle Fairley guest stars	13 July 1995
78	"The Lives of Brian"	David Richards	David Hoskins	Ken Stott guest stars	14 July 1995
79	"Skin Deep"	Robin Sheppard	Simon Frith	Burt Caesar guest stars	18 July 1995
80	"Kid"	David Skynner	Mark Holloway	Simon Merrells guest stars	20 July 1995
81	"A Bird in the Hand"	Simon Meyers	Tom Needham	Albert Welling and Paul Barber guest star	21 July 1995
82	"Over the Top"	David Skynner	Bob Eaton	Neil Maskell and Ameet Chana guest star	25 July 1995
83	"Body Beautiful"	Jonathan Dent	James Stevenson	Lesley Vickerage and Mark Arden guest star	27 July 1995
84	"What the Eye Doesn't See"	Baz Taylor	Ray Brooking	Claire Goose guest stars	28 July 1995
85	"In Control"	Jonathan Dent	Matthew Wingett	Jim McManus guest stars	1 August 1995
86	"Presumed Guilty"	Nicholas Mallett	David Hoskins	Karen Henthorn and Amanda Drew guest star	3 August 1995
87	"Under the Doctor"	Mike Cocker	Simon Moss	Susannah Corbett guest stars	4 August 1995
88	"Ritual"	Brian Farnham	Peter J. Hammond	Denys Hawthorne guest stars	8 August 1995
89	"Whipping Boy"	Danny Hiller	Graham White	—	10 August 1995
90	"The Devil You Don't Know"	Jeremy Silberston	Steve Handley	Roy Skelton, Sharon Small and Lesley Nicol guest star	11 August 1995
91	"Normal Behaviour"	Chris Lovett	Graham Mitchell	—	15 August 1995
92	"Charity and Beating"	Danny Hiller	Richard Stoneman	Lucy Davis guest stars	17 August 1995
93	"Nearest and Dearest"	Brian Farnham	Duncan Gould	Colin Buchanan guest stars	18 August 1995
94	"Mother's Ruin"	Derek Lister	Isabelle Grey	Idris Elba guest stars	22 August 1995
95	"Russian Doll"	James Cellan Jones	Sebastian Secker-Walker	—	24 August 1995
96	"Mitigating Circumstances"	Nicholas Laughland	Suj Ahmed	Ray Winstone and Nigel Lindsay guest star	25 August 1995
97	"Now and Then"	Derek Lister	John Brennan	Scott Neal guest stars	29 August 1995
98	"Three in a Bed"	A.J. Quinn	Chris Ould	—	31 August 1995
99	"The Writing on the Wall"	A.J. Quinn	Mark Holloway	—	1 September 1995
100	"Too Clever by Half"	Simon Meyers	Steve Griffiths	David Sibley guest stars	5 September 1995
101	"Heat"	Gill Wilkinson	Elizabeth-Anne Wheal	Owen Aaronovitch, Sam Kelly and Andrew Lancel guest star	7 September 1995
102	"Still Waters"	Baz Taylor	J. C. Wilsher	Hans Matheson guest stars	8 September 1995
103	"All in the Game"	Nicholas Mallett	Edwin Pearce	Michael Attwell and Roy North guest star	12 September 1995
104	"Sins of the Father"	Robin Sheppard	Carole Forbes	—	14 September 1995
105	"Night Beat"	John Bruce	Chris Lang	—	15 September 1995
106	"Balancing the Scales"	Chris Lovett	Julian Perkins	Charlie Condou and David Quilter guest star	19 September 1995
107	"For Services Rendered"	Mike Cocker	Jonathan Myerson	Final regular appearance of DS Danny Pearce	21 September 1995
108	"Response Time"	Jeremy Silberston	Elizabeth-Anne Wheal	Davyd Harries guest stars	22 September 1995
109	"Knowing the Score (Part 1)"	Laurence Moody	Margaret Phelan	Return of WDS Jo Morgan; Meera Syal, Martin Reeve, Rob Jarvis, Rowena Cooper and Moya Brady guest star	26 September 1995
110	"Some You Lose (Part 2)"	Laurence Moody	Margaret Phelan	Meera Syal, Moya Brady, Rowena Cooper and Rob Jarvis guest star	28 September 1995
111	"Rock-a-bye Baby"	Baz Taylor	David G. McDonagh	Victoria Alcock guest stars	29 September 1995
112	"Video Nasty"	James Cellan Jones	David Hoskins	Michael Redfern guest stars	3 October 1995
113	"Bad Pictures"	Laurence Moody	Terry Hodgkinson	Shaun Parkes, Jasper Britton and Ian Redford guest star	5 October 1995
114	"Fire (Part 1)"	John Strickland	Edward Canfor-Dumas	Joan Ann Maynard guest stars	6 October 1995
115	"All Tucked Up (Part 2)"	John Strickland	Edward Canfor-Dumas	—	10 October 1995
116	"Bait (Part 3)"	John Strickland	Edward Canfor-Dumas	Final appearances of Ch Insp Paul Stritch and WDS Jo Morgan; Amanda Abbington guest stars	12 October 1995
117	"Damage Limitation (Part 4)"	John Strickland	Edwin Pearce	—	13 October 1995
118	"Solid Gold Cert"	Laurence Moody	Neil Clarke	—	17 October 1995
119	"Mugs"	Dominic Lees	Mark Holloway	Bruce Byron guest stars	19 October 1995
120	"Off Limits"	Dominic Lees	Peter J. Hammond	Annette Badland, Shirin Taylor and Patsy Rowlands guest star	20 October 1995
121	"Strictly Personal"	Keith Boak	Marianne Colbran	—	24 October 1995
122	"Day of Rest"	A.J. Quinn	Roy MacGregor	Nicholas Day guest stars	26 October 1995
123	"Allegations and Allegiances"	Baz Taylor	Nigel Baldwin	Emma Amos guest stars	27 October 1995
124	"Honeypot"	Simon Meyers	Nick Crittenden	Craig Charles and Joe Absolom guest star	31 October 1995
125	"Saved"	Jeremy Silberston	Matthew Wingett	First regular appearance of DS John Boulton	2 November 1995
126	"A Year and A Day"	Gwennan Sage	Nicholas McInerny	—	3 November 1995
127	"With This Body"	Simon Meyers	Len Collin	Peter Craze guest stars	7 November 1995
128	"Deadline"	A.J. Quinn	David Hoskins	Hour-long episode; David Tennant, Dermot Crowley, Barbara Marten and Honeysuckle Weeks guest star	8 November 1995
129	"Lockdown"	Nick Laughland	Stephen Plaice	Charles Dale, Sean Scanlan, Pip Torrens and Geoffrey McGivern guest star	9 November 1995
130	"Last Waltz"	Michael Simpson	Tom Needham	Christine Kavanagh guest stars	10 November 1995
131	"Compensation"	Jeremy Silbertson	Nigel Baldwin	Gwyneth Strong and Bernard Holley guest star	14 November 1995
132	"The Wee Small Hours"	Gwennan Sage	Michael Jenner	Carol Leader guest stars	16 November 1995
133	"Photocall"	John Strickland	J. C. Wilsher	Matt Bardock guest stars	17 November 1995
134	"Love Me, Love My Dog"	John Bruce	Maxwell Young	Maggie Ollerenshaw guest stars	21 November 1995
135	"Heart of Gold"	Christopher Hodson	Neil Clarke	David Gooderson guest stars	23 November 1995
136	"Dying Breath"	Michael Simpson	Gregory Evans	Nicholas Donnelly guest stars	24 November 1995
137	"Poison"	Keith Boak	Chris Lang	Oscar James guest stars	28 November 1995
138	"Three in a Row"	Ken Hannam	Renny Krupinski	—	30 November 1995
139	"Neutral Territory"	Tom Cotter	David G. McDonagh	Wil Johnson guest stars	1 December 1995
140	"Getaway"	Kate Cheeseman	Candy Denman	Tom Hollander guest stars	4 December 1995
141	"Smoke Gets in Your Eyes"	Christopher Hodson	Jim Hawkins	Peter Tuddenham and John Ioannou guest star	7 December 1995
142	"Natural Justice"	Robin Sheppard	Graham Mitchell	Renu Setna and Barbara Wilshere guest star	12 December 1995
143	"Got To Get A Body"	Michael Cocker	Stephen C. Handley	Sally George, Kelly Marcel and Craig Heaney guest star	14 December 1995
144	"No Questions Asked"	Catherine Morshead	Ron Rose	Marc Warren and Philip McGough guest star	15 December 1995
145	"Sweet Innocent"	Michael Cocker	Scott Cherry	—	19 December 1995
146	"Drop"	Tom Cotter	Mark Holloway	Lee Turnbull guest stars	21 December 1995
147	"On the Lookout"	Kate Cheeseman	Richard McBrien	Chris Gascoyne guest stars	22 December 1995
148	"Ties that Bind"	Ken Hannam	Ron Rose	Ingrid Lacey guest stars	28 December 1995
149	"Journey Home"	Diana Patrick	Graham Harvey	Patrick Jordan, Connor McIntyre and Stewart Bevan guest star	29 December 1995

=== Series 12 (1996) ===
No. in series	Title	Directed by	Written by	Episode notes	Original release date
1	"Call Waiting"	John Bruce	Simon Moss	Susannah Wise guest stars	2 January 1996
2	"Second Sense"	Diana Patrick	Peter Gibbs	Cheryl Hall guest stars	4 January 1996
3	"Runners Up"	Nick Laughland	Robert Jones	Tracey Childs guest stars	5 January 1996
4	"Keeping It in the Family"	Frank W. Smith	Tony Lindsay	Nicholas Pinnock and Lloyd McGuire guest star	9 January 1996
5	"Home Truths"	June Howson	Katharine Way	Danny Dyer guest stars	11 January 1996
6	"Outer"	Nick Laughland	J. C. Wilsher	Rhona Mitra guest stars	12 January 1996
7	"Better Half"	Catherine Morshead	Jonathan David	Nigel Humphreys guest stars	16 January 1996
8	"No Assistance Required"	Robin Sheppard	Richard Stoneman	Neil Stuke guest stars	18 January 1996
9	"Judgement Call"	Martin Hutchings	Julian Spilsbury	Hour-long special; final appearance of WPC Cathy Marshall; Tina Hobley, Nicholas Ball and Clive Carter guest star	19 January 1996
10	"Old Dogs, New Tricks"	Frank W. Smith	Jonathan Myerson	—	23 January 1996
11	"Worst Fears: Part 1"	Robin Shepperd	Richard Stoneman	Clare Holman guest stars	25 January 1996
12	"One Night With You: Part 2"	Derek Lister	Chris Ould	—	26 January 1996
13	"Someone Else's Problem"	John Bruce	Renny Krupinski	Richard Beale guest stars	30 January 1996
14	"Bounds of Decency"	Corin Campbell Hill	Avril E. Russell	—	1 February 1996
15	"Happy Birthday"	Sarah Harding	Tom Needham	—	2 February 1996
16	"Stop the Music"	Sarah Harding	Margaret Ousby	Sharon Duncan-Brewster and Ayesha Antoine guest star	6 February 1996
17	"Cold Light of Day"	Corin Campbell Hill	David G. McDonagh	—	8 February 1996
18	"Back in Business"	Laurence Moody	Peter Gibbs	Ch Supt Charles Brownlow returns from Area; A/Supt Derek Conway returns to Ch Insp	9 February 1996
19	"Separate Rooms"	Jan Sargent	Nick Crittenden	Camilla Power and Ewen Bremner guest star	13 February 1996
20	"Going Guilty"	James Hawes	Mark Holloway	—	15 February 1996
21	"Pieces of Cake"	Derek Lister	Maxwell Young	—	16 February 1996
22	"Somebody's Home"	Jan Sargent	Simon Tyrrell	—	20 February 1996
23	"Pointing the Finger"	Simon Meyers	Edwin Pearce	Ron Donachie guest stars	22 February 1996
24	"Boy Meets Girl"	James Hawes	Simon Moss	Lloyd Owen guest stars	23 February 1996
25	"Confession"	David Richards	Terry Hodgkinson	Hour-long episode; final appearance of WPC Donna Harris, guest appearance of DS Danny Pearce; David Westhead guest stars	27 February 1996
26	"Home From Home"	June Howson	Stephen McAteer	—	29 February 1996
27	"Open Wound"	John Bruce	Tom Needham	—	1 March 1996
28	"Perfect Match"	Laurence Moody	Carolyn Sally Jones	—	5 March 1996
29	"Someone Special"	Gwennan Sage	Carolyn Sally Jones	Bruce Alexander guest stars	7 March 1996
30	"Bits and Pieces"	Simon Meyers	Terry Hodgkinson	Amanda Ryan, Lucy Benjamin and Peter Benson guest star	8 March 1996
31	"Home Help"	Michael Simpson	Peter Mills	Angela Bruce guest stars	12 March 1996
32	"Kicked Out"	Michael Ferguson	Stephen C. Handley	—	14 March 1996
33	"On the Block"	Michael Ferguson	J. C. Wilsher	Kenneth Watson guest stars	15 March 1996
34	"Getting Off"	Michael Cocker	Graham Mitchell	—	19 March 1996
35	"Girls' Night"	Gill Wilkinson	Gwyneth Hughes	—	21 March 1996
36	"Blood Brothers"	Jeremy Silberston	Manjit Singh	Roshan Seth guest stars	22 March 1996
37	"Broken Homes"	Robert Del Maestro	Gregory Evans	WPC June Ackland is promoted to Acting Sergeant (off screen)	23 March 1996
38	"A Hornet's Nest"	Robert Del Maestro	Candy Denman	Melanie Kilburn guest stars	28 March 1996
39	"Dead of Night"	Ian White	Julian Jones	First appearance of June Ackland as A/Sgt; Rosie Cavaliero guest stars	29 March 1996
40	"Party Pooper"	James Hawes	Isabelle Grey	Daniel Casey guest stars	2 April 1996
41	"More Haste"	Jeremy Silberston	David Hoskins	—	4 April 1996
42	"Beating the Odds"	Ian White	Edwin Pearce	Jamie Glover, Freddie Earlle and Amelia Curtis guest star	5 April 1996
43	"Animal"	Kate Cheeseman	Tom Needham	Ian Reddington and Sheree Murphy guest star	9 April 1996
44	"Dangerous Game"	Brian Parker	Elizabeth-Anne Wheal	Hour-long episode; final appearance of Sgt Ray Steele; Tracey Wilkinson guest stars	10 April 1996
45	"Dancers"	Nick Laughland	Mark Holloway	Tenniel Evans and Ray Armstrong guest star	12 April 1996
46	"And Nothing But"	Michael Simpson	Richard Stoneman	—	16 April 1996
47	"Tale of Two Cities"	Tom Cotter	Spenser Frearson	Petra Markham guest stars	18 April 1996
48	"Cheating"	Kate Cheeseman	Spenser Frearson	Leslie Phillips and Carol Royle guest star	19 April 1996
49	"Decent Proposals"	Gill Wilkinson	Jonathan Myerson	Clare Cathcart and Trevor Cooper guest star	23 April 1996
50	"Going For a Song"	Martin Hutchings	Julian Spilsbury	Guest appearance of now-DS Mike Dashwood	25 April 1996
51	"Value Added"	Simon Meyers	Barry Simner	Malcolm Terris and Geff Francis guest stars	26 April 1996
52	"Professional Ethics"	Chris Lovett	David Hoskins	John Bowler guest stars	30 April 1996
53	"Accidents Will Happen"	Tom Cotter	David G. McDonagh	Paul Ritter guest stars	2 May 1996
54	"Time Spent"	Chris Lovett	Chris Ould	—	3 May 1996
55	"Conspiracy of Silence"	Peter Barber-Fleming	Margaret Phelan	Ann Davies guest stars	7 May 1996
56	"Cold Feet and Hot Coffee"	Gwennan Sage	Julian Perkins	Jason Done and Stephen Churchett guest star	9 May 1996
57	"Rollover"	Michael Simpson	Nick Crittenden	Libby Davison and Philip Wright guest star	10 May 1996
58	"Tough Love"	Martin Hutchings	Katharine Way	John Michie guest stars	14 May 1996
59	"With This Ring"	Nick Laughland	John Brennan	Roger Avon and Rowena Cooper guest star	16 May 1996
60	"Final Drive"	Michael Ferguson	Mark Holloway	Thomas Craig and Sukie Smith guest star	17 May 1996
61	"Voices"	Moira Armstrong	Peter J. Hammond	Sian Thomas and David Quilter guest star	21 May 1996
62	"Party On"	Danny Hiller	Mark Illis	Hilary Whitehall guest stars.	23 May 1996
63	"Hard Enough"	Dominic Lees	Lyndon Mallett	Elizabeth Berrington and Adrian Rawlins guest star	24 May 1996
64	"Cuckoo"	Danny Hiller	Nicholas McInerny	Honeysuckle Weeks, Olivia Hallinan and Campbell Morrison guest star	28 May 1996
65	"Helping Hands"	Peter Duffell	Clive Dawson	Aidan J. David guest stars	30 May 1996
66	"Jekyll and Hyde"	Danny Hiller	Edwin Pearce	Matthew Crompton guest stars	31 May 1996
67	"Knocking on the Door"	John Bruce	Steve Handley	First appearance of DS Geoff Daly	4 June 1996
68	"Lies and Statistics"	James Hawes	Elizabeth-Anne Wheal	Sean Gilder and David Quilter guest star	6 June 1996
69	"Butting In"	Michael Simpson	Sebastian Secker Walker	Barry Jackson, David Quilter and Lolita Chakrabarti guest star	7 June 1996
70	"The Bagman"	Michael Cocker	Richard McBrien	—	11 June 1996
71	"Overstepping the Mark"	John Bruce	Michael Jenner	Kris Marshall and David Quilter guest star	13 June 1996
72	"Filth"	Jo Shoop	Graham Mitchell	—	20 June 1996
73	"Camper"	Moira Armstrong	Terry Hodgkinson	Timothy Bateson and Avril Elgar guest star	21 June 1996
74	"Spill"	John Strickland	Michael Jenner	Hour-long episode; Lolita Chakrabarti and Bob Mason guest star	25 June 1996
75	"Apron Strings"	Adrian J. Fearnley	Len Collin	Denyse Alexander guest stars	27 June 1996
76	"One Step Ahead"	Simon Massey	Candy Denman	Ken Hutchison and Roy Skelton guest star	28 June 1996
77	"Starting Young"	Michael Ferguson	Andrew Rattenbury	Nathan Constance guest stars	2 July 1996
78	"Tart's Cards"	Simon Meyers	Margaret Ousby	Annie Hulley guest stars	4 July 1996
79	"Born Again"	Robin Sheppard	Simon Frith	Alexandra Gilbreath and Chris Tranchell guest stars	5 July 1996
80	"Kick Me Hard"	Audrey Cooke	Gregory Evans	—	9 July 1996
81	"All or Nothing"	Adrian J. Fearnley	Philip Kingston	—	11 July 1996
82	"Unlucky in Love"	Jo Shoop	Jonathan Rich	Anna Keaveney and Joanne Froggatt guest star	12 July 1996
83	"A Quick Return"	Brian Parker	Stephen McAteer	—	16 July 1996
84	"Sartorial Elegance"	Simon Massey	Nigel Baldwin	Joseph Kpobie guest stars	18 July 1996
85	"Don't Leave Me This Way"	Ian White	Graham White	Albert Welling and Margo Gunn guest star	19 July 1996
86	"Big Bullies"	Michael Simpson	Ron Rose	Jim McManus guest stars	23 July 1996
87	"Playing It by the Rules"	Chris Lovett	Sheila Duncan	—	25 July 1996
88	"True Colours"	Brian Parker	Elizabeth-Anne Wheal	—	26 July 1996
89	"Target"	John Strickland	Edward Canford-Dumas	Feature length rebroadcast of the episodes "Fire", "All Tucked Up" and "Bait" from Series 11	29 July 1996
90	"Dead Man's Hand"	Dominic Lees	Simon Tyrrell	Jamie Foreman guest stars	30 July 1996
91	"For Their Own Good"	Peter Duffell	Nigel Baldwin	Final appearance of DC Alan Woods; Lynn Farleigh and Billy McColl guest star	1 August 1996
92	"Theory and Practice"	Peter Barber-Fleming	Maxwell Young	Kacey Ainsworth guest stars	6 August 1996
93	"Drinking Partners"	Peter Lydon	Matthew Wingett	Tony Marshall guest stars	8 August 1996
94	"Lean on Me"	Simon Meyers	Barry Simner	Madeleine Howard guest stars	9 August 1996
95	"Reminders"	Chris Lovett	Michael Jenner	Vas Blackwood, Laurie Brett and Ricci Harnett guest star	13 August 1996
96	"Minding"	Nick Laughland	Mark Holloway	Charlotte Barker guest stars	15 August 1996
97	"Follow the Van"	Robin Sheppard	Stephen Plaice	Donald Douglas guest stars	16 August 1996
98	"Don't Kill the Messenger"	Jim Shields	Isabelle Grey	—	20 August 1996
99	"Junior"	Jim Shields	Julian Perkins	Trevor Byfield and Elizabeth McKechnie guest star	22 August 1996
100	"Pony Express"	Simon Meyers	David G. McDonagh	Andy Linden and Ade Sapara guest star	23 August 1996
101	"Out of Control"	Ian White	Edwin Pearce	David Hargreaves and Lucy Speed guest star	27 August 1996
102	"Day Tripper"	Gill Wilkinson	Chris Smyth	—	29 August 1996
103	"Waiting for Frank"	Robert Del Maestro	Chris Ould	Jonathan Phillips guest stars	30 August 1996
104	"A Day in the Life"	Audrey Cooke	Robert Jones	Kulvinder Ghir, Jack Deam and Maxine Evans guest star	3 September 1996
105	"Second Chances"	Nick Laughland	Manjit Singh	Paul Bhattacharjee guest stars	5 September 1996
106	"Repossession"	Peter Lydon	Lyndon Mallet	Gerry Cowper, Jan Pearson and Lorcan Cranitch guest star	6 September 1996
107	"Liar"	Michael Simpson	Spenser Frearson	First appearance of DC Liz Rawton; Elizabeth Bennett guest stars	10 September 1996
108	"Detained"	Ken Horn	Jimmy Gardner	Scott Neal and Sara Stockbridge guest star	12 September 1996
109	"Karma"	Brian Parker	Edward Canford-Dumas	Jim Norton guest stars	13 September 1996
110	"Stolen Moments"	Audrey Cooke	Julian Perkins	Judy Flynn guest stars	17 September 1996
111	"A Good Night Out"	Tom Cotter	Richard Stoneman	Hour-long episode; A/Sgt June Ackland becomes full-time Sgt; Martin Glyn Murray and Oliver Smith guest star	18 September 1996
112	"Chatterbox"	Ian White	Simon Moss	Adrian Bower and Desmond Askew guest star	19 September 1996
113	"Too Close For Comfort"	Robin Sheppard	Maxwell Young	Steve John Shepherd and Lorraine Ashbourne guest star	20 September 1996
114	"Blame"	Chris Lovett	Gwyneth Hughes	Gerry Cowper guest stars	24 September 1996
115	"Once a Thief"	Robert Del Maestro	Tony Mulholland	—	26 September 1996
116	"Party Animals"	Moira Armstrong	Katharine Way	Jake Wood guest stars	27 September 1996
117	"Natural Causes"	Morag Fullarton	Simon Tyrrell	Colin Buchanan and Mary Healey guest star	1 October 1996
118	"Known To Someone"	Derek Lister	Joanne Maguire	JoAnne Good, Luisa Bradshaw-White and Gerry Cowper guest star	3 October 1996
119	"Champing at the Bit"	Diana Patrick	Robert Jones	Hermione Gulliford guest stars	4 October 1996
120	"Taking Out the Rubbish"	Ken Horn	A. Valentine	Joel Beckett guest stars	8 October 1996
121	"Presumed Innocent"	Harry Bradbeer	Elizabeth-Anne Wheal	Michael McKell and Roger Blake guest star	10 October 1996
122	"Change of Heart"	Gill Wilkinson	Graham Mitchell	—	11 October 1996
123	"Hedging Your Bets"	Roger Gartland	Candy Denman	Peter Jeffrey, Hilary Mason and Barbara Young guest star	15 October 1996
124	"Out of the Past"	Robin Sheppard	Tony Lindsay	Sam Callis guest stars	17 October 1996
125	"Road to Recovery"	Jo Shoop	Len Collin	Eddie Marsden guest stars	18 October 1996
126	"Three Fools"	Moira Armstrong	Mark Illis	Johanna Hargreaves guest stars	22 October 1996
127	"Track Marks"	Harry Bradbeer	James Stevenson	—	24 October 1996
128	"In for the Kill"	Derek Lister	Tom Needham	—	25 October 1996
129	"Remote Control"	Steve Shill	Julian Spilsbury	—	29 October 1996
130	"Telling Tales"	Jo Shoop	Renny Krupinski	Derek Newark Kate Williams and Malcolm Tierney guest star	31 October 1996
131	"Old Codgers"	Martin Hutchings	Chris Ould	Freddie Jones and Patrick Godfrey guest star	1 November 1996
132	"Trap"	Christopher Hodson	Michael Jenner	—	5 November 1996
133	"All in the Mind"	Diana Patrick	Edwin Pearce	Cathy Shipton guest stars	7 November 1996
134	"Trust Me"	Roger Gartland	Isabelle Grey	Paul Greenwood and Catherine Cusack guest star	8 November 1996
135	"Nice Boy"	Brian Parker	Scott Cherry	Nadim Sawalha guest stars	12 November 1996
136	"A Woman's Place"	James Hawes	Simon Moss	—	14 November 1996
137	"Finishing School"	Michael Cocker	Barry Simner	—	15 November 1996
138	"Death of a Nobody"	Simon Meyers	Tom Needham	Hour-long episode; Peter Guinness and Philip McGough guest star	19 November 1996
139	"Up the Wall"	Steve Shill	Lyndon Mallett	—	21 November 1996
140	"Boiling Point"	Christopher Hodson	Neil Clarke	Kenneth Colley guest stars	22 November 1996
141	"Mirror Image"	John Bruce	Katharine Way	—	26 November 1996
142	"Public Relations"	Brian Parker	Philip Kingston	—	28 November 1996
143	"Lock 'Em In"	Roger Gartland	Sebastian Secker Walker	Jeremy Bulloch guest stars	29 November 1996
144	"Opportunity Costs"	Martin Hutchings	Edward Canford-Dumas	—	3 December 1996
145	"Paying For It"	Jane Prowse	Mark Holloway	—	5 December 1996
146	"Many Happy Returns"	Adrian J. Fearnley	Andrew Rattenbury	Paul Jerricho guest stars	6 December 1996
147	"Black Money"	Roger Gartland	Terry Hodgkinson	Dominic Guard and Danny Webb guest star	10 December 1996
148	"Scorned"	Morag Fullarton	Tracey Black	Brian Protheroe, Jane Slavin and Geraldine Fitzgerald guest star	12 December 1996
149	"Stolen Kisses"	Michael Cocker	Manjit Singh	Samantha Seager and Jo Martin guest star	13 December 1996
150	"Jumping to Conclusions"	Harry Bradbeer	Philip Kingston	—	17 December 1996
151	"Toe the Line"	James Hawes	Stephen Plaice	Michael Attwell, Michelle Gomez, Joe Absolom and David Schofield guest star	19 December 1996
152	"A Gun to the Head"	Chris Lovett	Maxwell Young	John Fraser and Rob Edwards guest star	20 December 1996
153	"Merrily on High"	Michael Cocker	Robert Jones	New opening sequence introduced; Danny Dyer and Frank Mills guest star	24 December 1996
154	"Hers"	Michael Cocker	Mark Holloway	Tamzin Outhwaite guest stars	26 December 1996
155	"Hat Trick"	John Bruce	Stephen Greenhorn	Eric Mason guest stars	27 December 1996
156	"The Right Thing"	Nigel Douglas	Tony Mulholland	First appearance of PC Jamila Blake; Paul Bettany and Ken Bones guest star	31 December 1996

== Cancellation ==
On 26 March 2010, ITV announced that The Bill would end after 27 years on air due to a drop in ratings, and on 31 August 2010, the final episode, "Respect: Part 2" was aired, bringing the total number of episodes to 2425.
