= Dave Atkins (actor) =

British actor (1940–2008)

Dave Aktins
- Born: David James Atkins; 11 October 1940; Plymouth, Devon, England
- Died: 23 April 2008 (aged 67); Watford, Hertfordshire, England
- Occupation: Actor
- Years active: 1975–2008

David James Atkins (11 October 1940 – 23 April 2008) was an English actor mostly known for portraying Sharkey in Britannia Hospital, Moving Man No.1 in Clive Barker's Hellraiser in 1987, and pub landlord Les in Men Behaving Badly.

Atkins died of heart failure in 2008, at age 67.

== Filmography ==
- The Odd Job (1978) – Milkman
- Britannia Hospital (1982) – Sharkey
- P'tang, Yang, Kipperbang (1982) – Fish Shop Owner
- Mr. Love (1985) – Undertaker
- Personal Services (1987) – Sydney
- Prick Up Your Ears (1987) – Mr. Sugden
- Hellraiser (1987) – Moving Man No.1

== Television ==
- Law & Order (1978) as P.O. Dorman
- Minder (1982) as Kenny
- The New Statesman (1991) as Liberal Democrat MP
- Men Behaving Badly (1992–1995) Les the dribbly landlord of the Crown pub
- The Upper Hand (1990–1993) as Pixie
- Minder (1993) as Punter
- Auf Wiedersehen, Pet (2002) as Arthur
