= Colin Spaull =

British actor (born 1944)

Colin Spaull (born 1944) is a British actor noted for his television work.

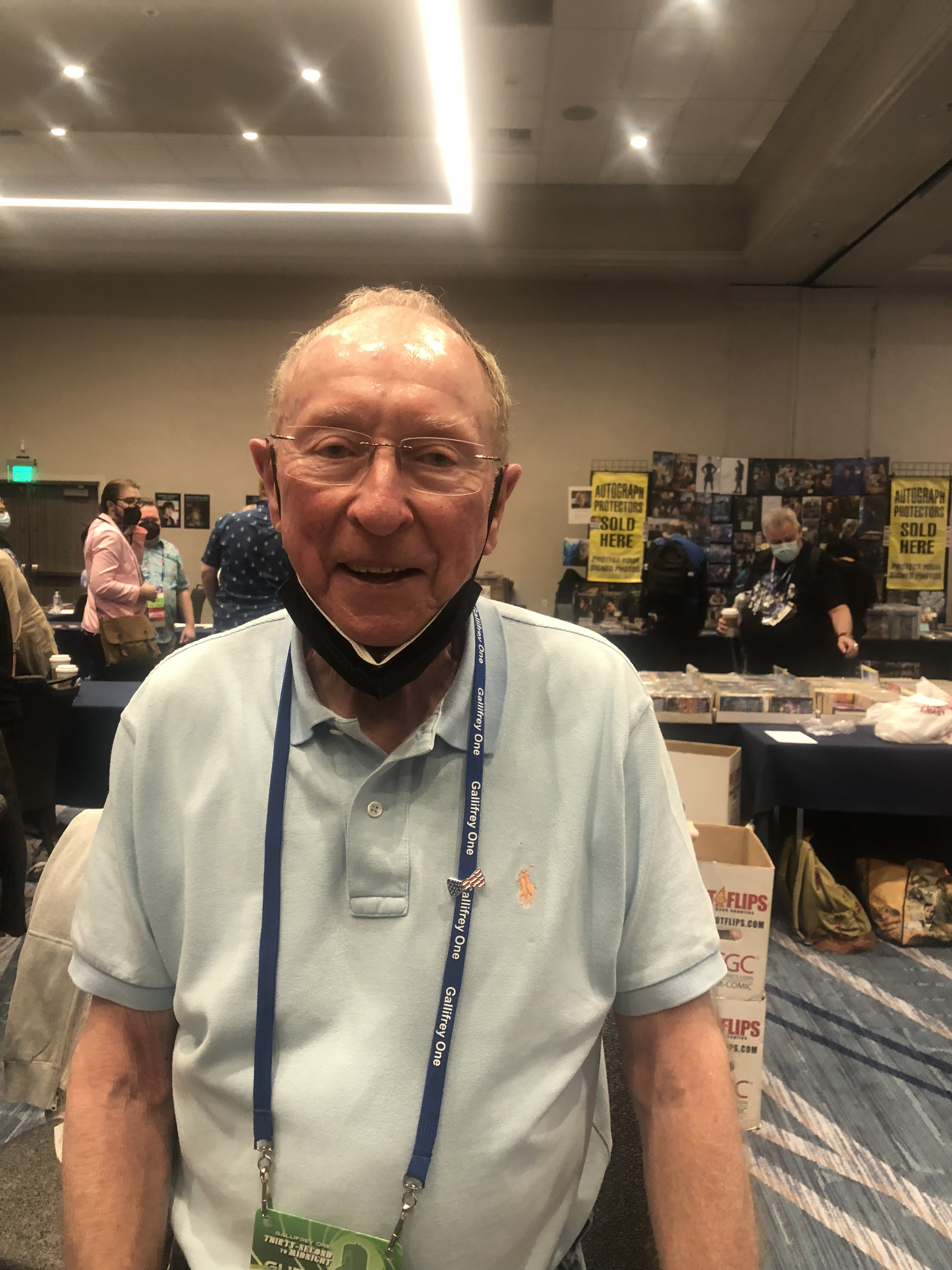
Colin Spaull taken at GallifreyOne convention 2022

Trained at what was then the Italia Conti School, now the Conti Academy of Theatre Arts, his credits include: Z-Cars (in which he played three characters between 1964 and 1969), Dixon of Dock Green, Doctor Who (in the stories Revelation of the Daleks, "Rise of the Cybermen" and "The Age of Steel"), Boon, Goodnight Sweetheart, Inspector Morse, The Bill (in which he has played seven characters between 1985 and 2003), Casualty and Holby City. He appeared in one episode of The Inbetweeners as Roy, Will's neighbour.

Spaull started as a child actor and has a number of leading roles to his name, including that of Noddy in Noddy In Toyland (1957), Venables in Jennings Goes to School (1958), young Pip in Great Expectations (1959) and Dickon Sowerby in The Secret Garden (1960).
