= Kieran Prendiville =

English-Irish television writer, producer, and presenter (born 1947)

- Born: 25 December 1947 (age 77); Rochdale, Lancashire, England
- Occupation(s): Writer, producer, presenter

Kieran Prendiville (born 25 December 1947) is an English-Irish television writer, producer, and presenter.

== Early life ==
Prendiville was born on 25 December 1947 in Rochdale, Lancashire, the son of an Irish father from Killorglin, County Kerry, who had relocated to Rochdale to practise medicine. He attended Clongowes Wood College in Clane, County Kildare, the same Jesuit boarding school his father had attended.

== Career ==
=== Presenting ===
Working alongside Glyn Worsnip, Prendiville was a presenter of the BBC consumer programme That's Life! from 1973 to 1978, having served on the production team from the very first episode. He was the BBC's on-site commentator on the first Space Shuttle mission, reporting from Cape Canaveral and Edwards Air Force Base. He was also a reporter at football matches on the BBC's Grandstand Saturday afternoon sports programme in the 1980s.

=== Writing ===
The creator of the 1990s BBC dramas Ballykissangel and Roughnecks, Prendiville's other writing credits include episodes of The Bill, Boon and Perfect Scoundrels (all ITV). He received praise and criticism for Care (2000), his controversial drama about child abuse in a Welsh children's home.
