= Sally George =

English actress

Sally George (born in Hull, East Riding of Yorkshire) is an English actress. Her credits include Buddha of Suburbia, EastEnders, Footballers Wives, Daziel and Pascoe, Mulberry, The Bill, Casualty, Doctors, Hollyoaks, Holby City, Heartbeat, Persuasion, and Love Somehow.

She was educated at St Johns Primary, Beverley, E Yorks, St Christopher School, Letchworth, Herts. She went to the Guildhall School of Music and Drama, and Central School of Speech and Drama.

Her daughter is Rafaella Hutchinson who is also an actress and they worked together in Jim Cartwright’s The Rise and Fall of Little Voice in 2018.
