= Rod Culbertson =

English actor

Rod Culbertson (born 28 April 1950) is an English actor.

== Biography ==
Born in Sunderland, County Durham he attended Bede Grammar School and then studied art at the Royal Central School of Speech and Drama. He appeared in Zigger Zagger in 1967 with the National Youth Theatre before embarking on a successful stage and screen career.

Culbertson played the role of Paul McCartney in the film Birth of the Beatles directed by Richard Marquand. He also acted in the film Elizabeth as Master Ridley.

== Filmography ==
- Birth of the Beatles - 1979
- Twelfth Night - 1996
- Elizabeth - 1998
