= List of Heartbeat cast members =

Heartbeat is a British period drama series, based upon the "Constable" series of novels written by Nicholas Rhea, and produced by ITV Studios (formerly Yorkshire Television until it was merged by ITV) from 1992 until 2010. The following is a list of actors who served as cast members for the programme, grouped by category of the role they maintained, ordered by first appearance and listing the series they served in. This list also included actors who maintained recurring roles during the programme's history.

== Main cast ==
Series		Sergeant
1	1–10	Sgt Oscar Blaketon
2	1–10	Sgt Oscar Blaketon
3	1–10	Sgt Oscar Blaketon
4	1–16	Sgt Oscar Blaketon
5	1–15	Sgt Oscar Blaketon
6	1–17	Sgt Oscar Blaketon
7	1–14	Sgt Oscar Blaketon
7	14–20	Sgt Nick Rowan
7	21–24	Mike Bradley
7	24	Sgt Raymond Craddock
8	1–24	Sgt Raymond Craddock
9	1–24	Sgt Raymond Craddock
10	1–24	Sgt Raymond Craddock
11	1–13	Sgt Raymond Craddock
11	13–25	Sgt Dennis Merton
12	1–25	Sgt Dennis Merton
13	1–25	Sgt Dennis Merton
14	1–12	Sgt Dennis Merton
14	12–13	–
14	14–15	Sgt Jennifer Nokes
14	16–26	Sgt George Miller
15	1–26	Sgt George Miller
16	1–24	Sgt George Miller
17	1–24	Sgt George Miller
18	1–24	Sgt George Miller

=== Sergeants ===
- Sgt. Oscar Blaketon (Derek Fowlds, series 1–18) is the first sergeant of Ashfordly Police from the start of the series until series 7, when he was forced to retire from the police force due to his health. In series 8, he took over the Aidensfield Post Office. In series 9, he took over as the owner of the Aidensfield Arms.
- Sgt. Nick Rowan (Nick Berry, series 7) is the second sergeant of Ashfordly Police.
- Sgt. Raymond Craddock (Philip Franks, series 8–11) is the third sergeant of Ashfordly Police. He arrives in the wake of Sgt. Nick Rowan’s sudden resignation.
- Sgt. Dennis Merton (Duncan Bell, series 11–14) is the fourth sergeant of Ashfordly Police. This is his first job since he was demoted from CID.
- Sgt. George Miller (John Duttine, series 14–18) is the fifth sergeant of Ashfordly Police.

=== Village officers ===
Series		Officer
1	1–10	PC Nick Rowan
2	1–10	PC Nick Rowan
3	1–10	PC Nick Rowan
4	1–16	PC Nick Rowan
5	1–15	PC Nick Rowan
6	1–17	PC Nick Rowan
7	1–14	PC Nick Rowan
7	14–24	PC Mike Bradley
8	1–24	PC Mike Bradley
9	1–24	PC Mike Bradley
10	1–24	PC Mike Bradley
11	1–25	PC Mike Bradley
12	1–15	PC Mike Bradley
12	16–25	PC Steve Crane
13	1–25	PC Steve Crane
14	1–26	PC Rob Walker
15	1–26	PC Rob Walker
16	1–24	PC Rob Walker
17	1–24	PC Joe Mason
18	1–24	PC Joe Mason

=== Officers ===
- PC Mike Bradley (Jason Durr, series 7–12) is the second village officer for Aidensfield of Ashfordly Police.
- PC Steve Crane (J. Carlton, series 12–13) is the third village officer for Aidensfield of Ashfordly Police.
- PC Rob Walker (Jonathan Kerrigan, series 14–16) is the fourth village officer for Aidensfield of Ashfordly Police.
- PC Joe Mason (Joe McFadden, series 17–18) is the fifth village officer for Aidensfield of Ashfordly Police.

=== Officers ===
Series		Officers	
1	1–10	PC Phil Bellamy	PC Alfred Ventress
2	1–10	PC Phil Bellamy	PC Alfred Ventress
3	1–10	PC Phil Bellamy	PC Alfred Ventress
4	1–16	PC Phil Bellamy	PC Alfred Ventress
5	1–15	PC Phil Bellamy	PC Alfred Ventress
6	1–17	PC Phil Bellamy	PC Alfred Ventress
7	1–24	PC Phil Bellamy	PC Alfred Ventress
8	1–24	PC Phil Bellamy	PC Alfred Ventress
9	1–24	PC Phil Bellamy	PC Alfred Ventress
10	1–24	PC Phil Bellamy	PC Alfred Ventress
11	1–25	PC Phil Bellamy	PC Alfred Ventress
12	1–25	PC Phil Bellamy	PC Alfred Ventress
13	1–20	PC Phil Bellamy	PC Alfred Ventress
13	20–25	PC Phil Bellamy	-
14	1–13	PC Phil Bellamy	-
14	14–26	PC Phil Bellamy	PC Geoff Younger
15	1–26	PC Phil Bellamy	PC Geoff Younger
16	1–24	PC Phil Bellamy	PC Geoff Younger
17	1–6	PC Phil Bellamy	PC Geoff Younger
17	6–24	PC Don Wetherby	PC Geoff Younger
18	1–24	PC Don Wetherby	PC Geoff Younger

=== Inspectors ===
Series		Inspectors
3	1–9	
3	10	Inspector Crossley
4	1	
4	2	Inspector Crossley
4	3–12	Inspector Murchison
4	13–16	
5	1–15	
6	1–17	
7	1–24	
8	1–24	
9	1–24	
10	1–24	
11	1–25	
12	1–25	
13	1–20	
14	14–26	
15	1–26	
16	1–24	
17	1–6	
17	6–24	
18	1–24	

=== Doctors ===
Series		Doctors	
1	1–10	Dr Kate Rowan	Dr Alex Ferrenby
2	1–10	Dr Kate Rowan	Dr Alex Ferrenby
3	1–4	Dr Kate Rowan	Dr Alex Ferrenby
3	5–10	Dr Kate Rowan	—N/a
4	1–16	Dr Kate Rowan	—N/a
5	1–3	Dr Kate Rowan	—N/a
5	4–15	—N/a	—N/a
6	1–17	—N/a	—N/a
7	1–10	—N/a	—N/a
7	11–24	Dr Neil Bolton	—N/a
8	1–19	Dr Neil Bolton	—N/a
8	20–24	—N/a	—N/a
9	1–24	—N/a	—N/a
10	1–11	—N/a	—N/a
10	12–24	Dr Tricia Summerbee	—N/a
11	1–25	—N/a	—N/a
12	1–15	—N/a	—N/a
12	16–25	Dr Liz Merrick	—N/a
13	1–25	Dr Liz Merrick	—N/a
14	1–10	Dr Liz Merrick	—N/a
14	11–12	Dr Liz Merrick	Dr Helen Trent
14	12–26	Dr Helen Trent	—N/a
15	1–26	Dr Helen Trent	—N/a
16	1–24	Nurse Carol Cassidy	—N/a
17	1–6	Nurse Carol Cassidy	—N/a
17	6–24	Nurse Carol Cassidy	—N/a
18	1–24	Nurse Carol Cassidy	—N/a

=== Doctors ===
- Dr. Kate Rowan (Niamh Cusack, series 1–5)
- Dr. Alex Ferrenby (Frank Middlemass, series 1–3)
- Dr. Tricia Summerbee (Clare Calbraith, series 10–12)
- Dr. Liz Merrick (Aislín McGuckin, series 12–14)
- Dr. Helen Trent (Sophie Ward, series 14–15, 18)

=== Nurses ===
- Nurse Maggie Bolton (Kazia Pelka, series 5–10)
- Nurse Carol Cassidy (Lisa Kay, series 16–18)

=== Aidensfield and Ashfordly police cast ===
Actor	Character	Appearances																	
Actor	Character	Series 1 (April–June 1992)	Series 2 (April–June 1993)	Series 3 (October–December 1993)	Series 4 (September–December 1994)	Series 5 (September–December 1995)	Series 6 (September–December 1996)	Series 7 (August 1997 – February 1998)	Series 8 (September 1998 – February 1999)	Series 9 (September 1999 – March 2000)	Series 10 (October 2000 – April 2001)	Series 11 (October 2001 – April 2002)	Series 12 (October 2002 – May 2003)	Series 13 (September 2003 – June 2004)	Series 14 (September 2004 – June 2005)	Series 15 (September 2005 – July 2006)	Series 16 (October 2006 – August 2007)	Series 17 (November 2007 – September 2008)	Series 18 (October 2008 – September 2010)
Nick Berry	PC/Sgt Nick Rowan	Starring	Starring	Starring	Starring	Starring	Starring	Starring											
Derek Fowlds	Sgt Oscar Blaketon	Starring	Starring	Starring	Starring	Starring	Starring	Starring	Starring	Starring	Starring	Starring	Starring	Starring	Starring	Starring	Starring	Starring	Starring
William Simons	Alf Ventress	Starring	Starring	Starring	Starring	Starring	Starring	Starring	Starring	Starring	Starring	Starring	Starring	Starring	Starring	Starring	Starring	Starring	Starring
Mark Jordon	PC Phil Bellamy	Starring	Starring	Starring	Starring	Starring	Starring	Starring	Starring	Starring	Starring	Starring	Starring	Starring	Starring	Starring	Starring	Starring	
Jason Durr	PC/DC Mike Bradley							Starring	Starring	Starring	Starring	Starring	Starring						
Simon Molloy	DI Shiner	Guest						Recurring		Recurring	Recurring	Recurring	Recurring	Recurring	Recurring	Recurring			
Philip Franks	Sgt Raymond Craddock							Starring	Starring	Starring	Starring	Starring							
Ryan Early	PC Thomas Nicholson											Starring							
Duncan Bell	Sgt Dennis Merton											Starring	Starring	Starring	Starring				
James Carlton	PC Stephen Crane												Starring	Starring					
Jonathan Kerrigan	PC Rob Walker														Starring	Starring	Starring		
Steven Blakeley	PC Geoffrey Younger														Starring	Starring	Starring	Starring	Starring
John Duttine	Sgt George Miller														Starring	Starring	Starring	Starring	Starring
Clare Wille	DS Rachel Dawson																Starring	Starring	Starring
Joe McFadden	PC Joe Mason																	Starring	Starring
Rupert Ward-Lewis	PC Don Wetherby																	Starring	Starring
Georgie Glen	Sgt Jennifer Nokes									Recurring	Recurring			Recurring	Recurring				Guest

=== Medical staff cast ===
Actor	Character	Appearances																	
Actor	Character	Series 1 (April–June 1992)	Series 2 (April–June 1993)	Series 3 (October–December 1993)	Series 4 (September–December 1994)	Series 5 (September–December 1995)	Series 6 (September–December 1996)	Series 7 (August 1997 – February 1998)	Series 8 (September 1998 – February 1999)	Series 9 (September 1999 – March 2000)	Series 10 (October 2000 – April 2001)	Series 11 (October 2001 – April 2002)	Series 12 (October 2002 – May 2003)	Series 13 (September 2003 – June 2004)	Series 14 (September 2004 – June 2005)	Series 15 (September 2005 – July 2006)	Series 16 (October 2006 – August 2007)	Series 17 (November 2007 – September 2008)	Series 18 (October 2008 – September 2010)
Niamh Cusack	Dr Kate Rowan	Starring	Starring	Starring	Starring	Starring													
Frank Middlemass	Dr Alex Ferrenby	Starring	Starring	Starring															
Peter Firth	Dr James Radcliffe				Recurring														
Kazia Pelka	Nurse Maggie Bolton					Starring	Starring	Starring	Starring	Starring	Starring								
David Michaels	Dr Neil Bolton							Starring	Starring										
Clare Calbraith	Dr Tricia Summerbee										Starring	Starring	Starring						
Sarah Tansey	Pharmacist Jenny Latimer											Starring	Starring	Starring	Starring				
Aislín McGuckin	Dr Liz Merrick												Starring	Starring	Starring				
Sophie Ward	Dr Helen Trent														Starring	Starring			
Lisa Kay	Nurse Carol Cassidy																Starring	Starring	Starring
Leon Ockenden	Dr Chris Oakley																	Recurring	

=== "Loveable rogue" cast ===
Actor	Character	Original																	
Actor	Character	Appearances																	
Actor	Character	Series 1 (April–June 1992)	Series 2 (April–June 1993)	Series 3 (October–December 1993)	Series 4 (September–December 1994)	Series 5 (September–December 1995)	Series 6 (September–December 1996)	Series 7 (August 1997 – February 1998)	Series 8 (September 1998 – February 1999)	Series 9 (September 1999 – March 2000)	Series 10 (October 2000 – April 2001)	Series 11 (October 2001 – April 2002)	Series 12 (October 2002 – May 2003)	Series 13 (September 2003 – June 2004)	Series 14 (September 2004 – June 2005)	Series 15 (September 2005 – July 2006)	Series 16 (October 2006 – August 2007)	Series 17 (November 2007 – September 2008)	Series 18 (October 2008 – September 2010)
Bill Maynard	Claude Jeremiah Greengrass	Starring	Starring	Starring	Starring	Starring	Starring	Starring	Starring	Starring	Starring								
Geoffrey Hughes	Vernon Scripps										Starring	Starring	Starring	Starring	Starring		Guest		
Gwen Taylor	Peggy Armstrong														Starring	Starring	Starring	Starring	Starring

=== Aidensfield residents cast ===
Actor	Character	Appearances																	
Actor	Character	Series 1 (April–June 1992)	Series 2 (April–June 1993)	Series 3 (October–December 1993)	Series 4 (September–December 1994)	Series 5 (September–December 1995)	Series 6 (September–December 1996)	Series 7 (August 1997 – February 1998)	Series 8 (September 1998 – February 1999)	Series 9 (September 1999 – March 2000)	Series 10 (October 2000 – April 2001)	Series 11 (October 2001 – April 2002)	Series 12 (October 2002 – May 2003)	Series 13 (September 2003 – June 2004)	Series 14 (September 2004 – June 2005)	Series 15 (September 2005 – July 2006)	Series 16 (October 2006 – August 2007)	Series 17 (November 2007 – September 2008)	Series 18 (October 2008 – September 2010)
Jack Deam	Alan Maskell	Recurring																	
Stuart Golland	George Ward	Starring	Starring	Starring	Starring	Starring	Starring												
Tricia Penrose	Gina Ward		Starring	Starring	Starring	Starring	Starring	Starring	Starring	Starring	Starring	Starring	Starring	Starring	Starring	Starring	Starring	Starring	Starring
Rupert Vansittart	Lord Ashfordly	Recurring	Recurring			Recurring	Recurring	Recurring	Recurring	Recurring	Recurring	Recurring	Recurring	Recurring	Recurring	Recurring	Recurring	Recurring	Recurring
David Lonsdale	David Stockwell			Guest		Recurring	Recurring	Recurring	Starring	Starring	Starring	Starring	Starring	Starring	Starring	Starring	Starring	Starring	Starring
Anne Stallybrass	Eileen Reynolds			Guest		Starring	Starring	Starring											
Juliette Gruber	Jo Weston					Starring	Starring	Starring											
Peter Benson	Bernard Scripps					Starring	Starring	Starring	Starring	Starring	Starring	Starring	Starring	Starring	Starring	Starring	Starring	Starring	Starring
Bernard Gallagher	Graham Weston						Recurring	Recurring											
Arbel Jones	Mary Ward								Starring	Starring									
Fiona Dolman	Jacqueline Lambert								Starring	Starring	Starring								
Martin Ledwith	Andy Ryan									Recurring									
Richard Lintern	Ben Norton													Starring	Starring				
Vanessa Hehir	Rosemary Cartwright														Starring	Starring	Starring	Starring	
Murray Head	Jack Hollins															Starring	Guest		
Josefina Gabrielle	Debbie Bellamy															Recurring			
Nikki Sanderson	Dawn Bellamy																	Starring	Starring

== Recurring characters ==
This section lists other characters who have appeared in more than one episode.

- Jack Deam as Alan Maskell (1992).
- Eileen O'Brien as Susan Maskell (credited as "Mrs Maskell") (1992).
- Barrie Rutter as Walter Maskell (credited as "Mr Maskell") (1992).
- Suzanne Hitchmough as Sandra Murray (1992).
- Shirley Stelfox as Mrs. Parkin (1992).
- Anne Rye as Angela Hamilton ("Miss Hamilton") (1992–1993)
- Andy Abrahams as unnamed local magistrate (1992–2003).
- Mike Kelly as Malcolm Mostyn (1993).
- Dean Gatiss as Graham Blaketon (1993–1994; 4 episodes).
- Sue Holderness as Joan Forrester (1993; 2 episodes).
- Russell Boulter as Inspector Crossley (1993–1994; 3 episodes).
- Melanie Kilburn as Rosie Tinniswood (1993, 1995; 2 episodes).
- Karen Meagher as Inspector Murchison (1994; 7 episodes)
- Julia Lane as Christine Ferguson (1994; 6 episodes).
- Lucy Robinson as Jennifer Radcliffe (1994; 3 episodes).
- Emelye Robinson as Susan Radcliffe (1994; 2 episodes).
- Lesley Nicol as Rita Stirling (1995; 3 episodes).
- Jenny Agutter as Susannah Temple-Richards (1994, 1996; 2 episodes).
- Harry Beety as Joseph Walker (1995; 9 episodes).
- Diane Langton as Ruby Rowan (1995–97; 6 episodes).
- William Ash as Joe Norton (1995; 2 episodes).
- Mark Addy as Norman Greengrass (1995–96; 2 episodes).
- Mary Healey as Mrs Watkins (1996; 4 episodes).
- Elizabeth Bennett as Joyce Jowett (1996–2009, 16 episodes).
- Kenneth Cranham as Charlie Wallace (1996; 2 episodes).
- Wanda Ventham as Fiona Weston (1996–1997, 4 episodes).
- Steven Townsley as Billy Burke (1996, 3 episodes).
- Dominic Rickhards as Steve Adams (1997; 5 episodes).
- Carol Royle as Lady Patricia Brewster (1997–2003; 4 episodes).
- Charlotte Mitchell as Bessie Bellamy (1997–1999; 4 episodes).
- Stratford Johns as Cyril Isaiah Greengrass (1997, 1998; 2 episodes).
- Gareth Thomas as Nathaniel Clegghorn (1998-2004; 6 episodes).
- Alan Halsall as Trevor Chivers (1998–1999; 4 episodes).
- Stefan Podolchuk as Stuart Chivers (1998–1999; 4 episodes).
- Lesley Clare O'Neill as Doreen Chivers (1998–1999; 3 episodes).
- Keeley Forsyth as Sue Driscoll (1998, 2000; 7 episodes).
- Phillippa Wilson as Penny Craddock (1998–1999, 2000, 2002; 7 episodes).
- Maggie Tagney as Gladys Smethurst (1998–2000; 5 episodes).
- Georgie Glen as Sgt Jennifer Nokes (2000–2001, 2003–2004, 2005, 2010).
- Paul Opacic as Graham Rysinski (2000; 3 episodes).
- Susan Jameson as Edwina Lambert (2000–2001; 2 episodes).
- Barbara Bolton as Mrs Kellett (2001–2005; 9 episodes).
- Francis Matthews as Dr James Alway (2002-2003; 4 episodes).
- Christine Bottomley as Susie Ward (2002; 5 episodes).
- Beatrice Kelley as Olive Winstanley (6 episodes, 2003–2009).
- Anita Carey as Barbara Crane (2 episodes, 2003).
- Trevor Ray as William Barraclough (2 episodes, 2003–2004).
- Jane Hazlegrove as Diane Crichard (4 episodes, 2004).
- Helena Calvert as Clare Owen (4 episodes; 2005).
- Victor McGuire as Brian Parker (2005, two episodes).
- Tim Brooke-Taylor as Ronnie Smethers (2005, 2008, 2009; 4 episodes).
- Lauren Drummond as Jane Black (2005–2006).
- Gabriella Dixon as Susan Black (2005–2006).
- Jack Ferguson as Peter Black (2005–2006).

== Guest stars ==
Over the years, a number of well-known guest stars have made one-off appearances in Heartbeat, either in cameo roles or more substantial single-episode parts. These include Richard Todd, David Essex, David McCallum, Charlotte Church, Michelle Dockery, John Nettles, Philip Jackson, Geraldine Newman, Siobhan Finneran, John Simm, Gary Barlow, David Dickinson, Todd Carty, Philip Glenister, Lulu, George Cole, Ray Illingworth, Brian Close, Margaret Tyzack, Roy Dotrice, Roland Gift, Ralf Little, Dickie Bird, Daniel Craig, Clive Swift, Jean Alexander, Geoffrey Bayldon, Clive Mantle, Tim Brooke-Taylor, Twiggy, Benedict Cumberbatch, Noel Fitzpatrick, Leslie Phillips, Lindsey Coulson, George Layton, Maureen O'Brien, Gabrielle Drake, Robin Ellis, Leslie Grantham, George Baker, Paul Nicholas, Brigit Forsyth, Jan Francis, Peter Vaughan, Celia Imrie, Helen Lederer, Alan Price, Sam Kelly, Duncan Preston, Rodney Bewes, Bobby Ball, Tommy Cannon, Russ Abbot, Jon Culshaw, Freddie Garrity, Miranda Raison, Dave King, Grahame Garden, and Michael Angelis.

== Timeline ==
=== Introduced in series 1 ===
- Nick Berry as PC (later Sgt) Nick Rowan (S1–7)
- Niamh Cusack as Dr. Kate Rowan (S1–5)
- Derek Fowlds as Sgt Oscar Blaketon (S1–18)
- Bill Maynard as Claude Jermaine Greengrass (S1–10)
- Mark Jordon as PC Phil Bellamy (S1–17)
- Bill Simons as PC Alf Ventress (S1–18)
- Frank Middlemass as Dr. Ferrenby (S1–3)
- Stuart Golland as George Ward (S1–4)
- Rupert Vansittart as Lord Ashfordly (S1–17)
- Jack Deam as Alan Maskell (S1)

=== Introduced in series 2 ===
- Mike Kelly as Malcolm Mostyn (S2–3)
- Tricia Penrose as Gina Ward (S2–18)

=== Introduced in series 3 ===
- David Lonsdale as David Stockwell (S3–18)

=== Introduced in series 4 ===
- Peter Firth as Dr. J Radcliffe (S4)

=== Introduced in series 5 ===
- Kazia Pelka as Nurse Maggie Bolton (S5–10)
- Peter Benson as Bernie Scripps (S5–18)

=== Introduced in series 6 ===
- Juliette Gruber as Jo Rowan (S6–7)
- Elizabeth Bennett as Joyce Jowett (S6, S11–18)

=== Introduced in series 7 ===
- Jason Durr as PC Mike Bradley (S7–12)

=== Introduced in series 8 ===
- Philip Franks as Sgt Raymond Craddock (S8–11)
- Fiona Dolman as Jackie Bradley (S8–10)
- Arbel Jones as Mary Ward (S8–9)
- Keeley Forsyth as Sue Driscoll (S8–10)

=== Introduced in series 9 ===
- Martin Ledwith as Andy Ryan (S9)
- Georgie Glen as Sgt Jennifer Nokes (S9–10, S13–14, S18)

=== Introduced in series 10 ===
- Geoffrey Hughes as Vernon Scripps (S10–14)
- Clare Calbraith as Dr. Tricia Summerbee (S10–12)

=== Introduced in series 11 ===
- Duncan Bell as Sgt Dennis Merton (S11–14)
- Sarah Tansey as Jenny Merton (S11–14)
- Ryan Early as PC Thomas Nicolson (S11)

=== Introduced in series 12 ===
- Aislín McGuckin as Dr. Liz Merrick (S12–14)
- J. Carlton as PC Steve Crane (S12–13)

=== Introduced in series 13 ===
- Richard Lintern as Ben Norton (S13–14)

=== Introduced in series 14 ===
- Jonathan Kerrigan as PC Rob Walker (S14–17)
- Sophie Ward as Dr. Helen Trent (S14–15)
- John Duttine as Sgt George Miller (S14–18)
- Gwen Taylor as Peggy Armstrong (S14–18)

=== Introduced in series 15 ===
- Steven Blakeley as PC Geoff (S15–18)
- Vanessa Hehir as Rosmary Cartwright (S15–17)
- Josefina Gabrielle as Debbie Black (S15)

=== Introduced in series 16 ===
- Lisa Kay as Nurse Carol Cassidy (S16–18)

=== Introduced in series 17 ===
- Joe McFadden as PC Joe Mason (S17–18)
- Nikki Sanderson as Dawn Bellamy (S17–18)
- Leon Ockenden as Dr. Chris Oakley (S17)

== See also ==
- Heartbeat (British TV series)
- List of Heartbeat episodes
