= Kath Fox =

- Holby City character
- Jan Pearson as Kath Fox
- First appearance: "Knife Edge"; 23 December 1999
- Last appearance: "Pastures New"; 30 March 2004
- Portrayed by: Jan Pearson

In-universe information
- Occupation: Ward sister
- Family: Danny Shaughnessy (son); Lisa Fox (step-daughter)
- Spouses: Simon Shaughnessy; Terry Fox
- Significant others: Father Michael; Larry Phillips

Kath Fox (also Kath Shaughnessy) is a fictional character from the BBC medical drama Holby City, played by actress Jan Pearson. She first appeared in the series two episode "Knife Edge", broadcast on 23 December 1999. Kath arrives at Holby City hospital as a Ward Sister. She is characterised as a devout Catholic with high moral values and the over-protective mother of Danny Shaughnessy (Jeremy Edwards). Writers played off her strong faith, often making it centric to various dramatic plots they conjured up for her. Over a four-year period she became a tortured character who had been domestically abused by her husband Simon Shaughnessy (Andrew Dunn). The stigma of a divorce in her religion makes her feel unable to leave him.

She befriends and later falls in love with a priest, Father Michael (Martin Ledwith). Following a near fatal beating from Simon she moved on to a romance with moneyed Terry Fox (Miles Anderson), but their happiness is short-lived because of Terry's terminal cancer. Writers featured her in a euthanasia story, when she agrees to assist him in committing suicide. A feud with her step-daughter Lisa Fox (Luisa Bradshaw-White) was created and Kath found herself standing trial for assisted suicide. Kath was then a regular feature in a controversial serial killer plot, in which patients are murdered by staff nurse Kelly Yorke (Rachel Leskovac). She tries to frame Kath, who lays blame to Kelly's brother Nic Yorke (Liam Garrigan), which results in Kelly stabbing Kath in a near fatal clash.

Following the succession of bleak stories for her character, Pearson decided to leave Holby City. She had made her intentions clear to producers in 2003 and they convinced her to stay for an extra year. The actress requested her unlucky character leave the show amidst a happy ending. Writers introduced Larry Phillips (Dominic Mafham) as Kath's love interest and they move away together. Pearson has stated that Kath became one of the show's best loved characters. Critics of the genre have praised her portrayal of Kath, though Jim Shelley from the Daily Mirror criticised Kath, whom he believed often went against her own faith and morals.

== Development ==
=== Characterisation ===
Kath was a respected and excellent Ward Sister. She was resolute in the face of anything life threw at her. She had a calm nature which made people warm to her. A devout Catholic, she had her faith tested many times. After a number of traumas, she left Holby for pastures new with Architect Larry.

— An excerpt from Kath's profile on the official Holby City website.

The character first appeared in the series two episode "Knife Edge", which was broadcast on 23 December 1999. Kath is characterised as a "devout Catholic" and her strong faith causes her issues with a series of relationships writers created for her. She has an "easy-going and calm nature" which makes her well liked with colleagues and patients. Her Catholicism is referenced in the show. She uses her beliefs to help other characters, such as those who question their faith. Pearson described her character as "rather saintly by nature". She is a "very protective" mother to Danny Shaughnessy (Jeremy Edwards), but her attitude towards him constantly leaves him embarrassed. Kath struggled to come to terms with Danny growing up and becoming independent. She interferes in his work life and he becomes irritated with her. Following an "emotional confrontation" he decides to move out. When Danny leaves home Kath begins to suffer from 'empty nest' syndrome and seeks solace through her working life. Throughout her tenure writers have maintained a troubled personal life for Kath, through various doomed romances and dramatic storylines. Pearson has also described her on-screen counterpart as having "a hard life".

Pearson found challenging to play a character as "resolutely nice" as Kath is. She said that she is completely different to more "edgy" roles she has played previously. While Pearson states she is completely unlike Kath, she uses her own experiences to play her. She was once a teacher at a Sunday school and used this when portraying Kath's religious aspects.

=== Domestic abuse ===
One of Kath's early issue lead stories was becoming the victim of domestic abuse from her husband Simon Shaughnessy (Andrew Dunn). Initially Kath develops feelings for her colleague, the consultant general surgeon Mike Barratt (Clive Mantle). When they attend a course together they almost share a kiss. This tests Kath's faith and she decides to distance herself from him. Kath briefly break up with Simon, but he convinces her to return with the promise of counselling sessions. Simon tries to change his ways but his aggression towards Kath heightens the following month. She then bonds with a patient named Linda (Sonia Beinroth) whose husband has attacked her. Simon had long been aggressive towards Kath but it was only when she was admitted to the hospital following a "severe beating", would her colleagues discover the abuse. It happens after she becomes close with the on-site priest Father Michael (Martin Ledwith), which makes Simon jealous. When Father Michael drops Kath off at home following a church service, Simon beats Kath up and she is rushed into the hospital for emergency surgery. Danny becomes desperate to protect Kath from his father. He and Father Michael secure and decorate a new flat for Kath to live in when she is discharged. Father Michael gives Kath the courage to leave Simon for good. But their relationship cannot progress because both of their commitments to religion. Father Michael offers to leave the church but Kath believes it is wrong and ends their relationship.

The story was "very exciting" and a "challenge" to play for Pearson. To prepare for the plot, she researched the issue with social works who had experience working with domestic abuse victims. They helped her create the background details for the story. She wanted to talk to victims directly, but later decided it could be too intrusive. She also had to understand why Kath would stay with an abusive husband. Pearson told Andrew Davies from the Birmingham Post that "in Kath's case, the character has been married for 30 years and she's Catholic. That's very important to her - it's more about not wanting to break her vows which she made before God." The actress was happy to be given the storyline because it helped her to explore Kath's homelife. She believed writers had only ever shown Kath to be "strong, kind and centred". Exploring domestic abuse helped viewers understand the character better. Pearson added "to be able to explore what makes her marriage the way it is, what makes her tick, has been great."

Kath's relationship with Father Michael was her favourite storyline. She told a BBC Online reporter that "I liked the idea of her having a saucy relationship with a young man and a priest to boot." Writers devised an ending to the story in October 2002, when Kath files for divorce. When Simon receives the divorce papers he arrives at the hospital and angrily pins Kath up against a wall. She is scared by the encounter but after encouragement from Chrissie Williams (Tina Hobley) she decides to stand up to him.

=== Euthanasia ===
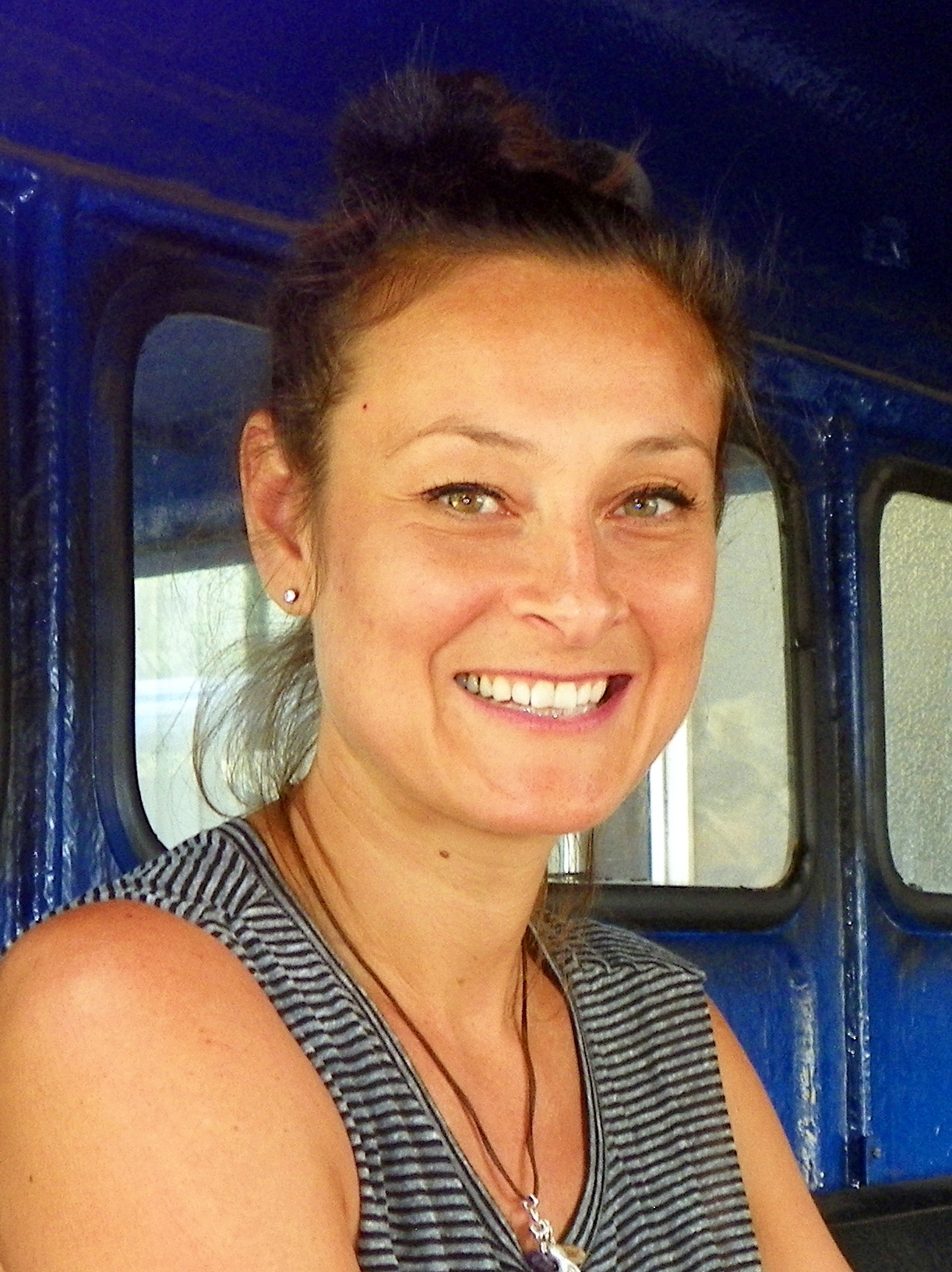
Luisa Bradshaw-White portrays Lisa Fox, Kath's step-daughter and enemy.

Producers created a story for Kath dealing with the controversial topic of euthanasia. Terry Fox (Miles Anderson) was introduced as the wealthy father of midwife Lisa Fox (Luisa Bradshaw-White). He is diagnosed with cancer and decides to divorce his wife. As Kath is also going through a divorce the pair agree to go on a date. A Daily Record journalist revealed that Kath would be cautious because of Terry's health but is "swayed by his infectious attitude to life." Lisa also becomes suspicious of their new romance.

Kath and Terry decide to get married when he finds out his cancer is terminal. They travel to a coastal holiday home for their honeymoon. Terry convinces Kath to help him commit suicide before spending their final hours together. When he is ready, Kath administers a lethal dose of morphine via a hypodermic needle. But Kath's act of euthanasia is suspected by an interfering neighbour. Lisa suspects that Kath killed her father and reports her to the police. Pearson and Anderson filmed the honeymoon and death scenes in one day. The actress recalled that she had cried that much on set that she barely had clear vision. She later revealed that she found the amount of crying Kath did "exhausting" and added they were her "hardest episodes" to film. Pearson called the storyline a "very serious subject" and found it challenging to portray it correctly.

The police decide to open an investigation into Terry's death and exhume his body for examination. A writer from Inside Soap said the development causes tension on the wards and leaves Kath "distraught". She knows they will discover that she helped Terry to die and Ric Griffin (Hugh Quarshie) decides to support Kath. He is shocked when evidence mounts that could also implicate him in the investigation. When a needle mark is identified on Terry's body, Kath is arrested on suspicion of murder. Kath is relieved when the murder charge is reduced to assisted suicide. She decides to plead not guilty which angers Lisa. Other staff do not believe that Kath is innocent and Danny rushes to her defense. Lisa confronts him and during an argument he almost hits her which makes Kath's situation worse. At the trial the prosecution begin to bring up aspects of Kath's past to use against her. Chrissie and Danny also testify, and the latter's temper is used to discredit Kath. The jury find Kath not guilty of all charges and she is released.

=== Serial killer ===
Writers placed Kath at the center of the show's long-running serial killer storyline, in which Kelly Yorke (Rachel Leskovac) begins killing numerous patients. Kath's role in the story was originally supposed to be played out by Laura Sadler's character Sandy Harper. The actress died before filming her part and producers decided to rewrite the story to feature Kath. Pearson told Claire Brand from Inside Soap that "I felt like I took it over and I was very ambivalent about those scenes." The story culminated in Kelly killing her mother Nina Yorke (Ellie Haddington), brother Nic Yorke (Liam Garrigan) and stabbing Kath. Following a number of patients dying on Keller, a Commission For Health report is published with a scathing review accusing the hospital of gross negligence. Helen Grant (Susannah York) decides to interview staff and find out who is responsible. Kelly is annoyed by the investigation and plots to frame Kath. When she is interviewed Kelly tells Helen that she thinks Kath is at fault. This leads Helen to focus her attention of Kath and they argue. The police and DI Jane Archer (Christine Entwisle) also begin to suspect that Kath is responsible. Following the death of another patient DI Archer returns again. A Liverpool Echo writer revealed that "Kath is particularly worried, having been at the centre of two cases in less than a year."

It is soon discovered that the patients have been killed via an overdose administered via their drips. When Nic finds an unresponsive patient he changes their drip, but Kath catches him. Garrigan told a reporter from Inside Soap that "Kath finds Nic with a syringe in his hand and a dead patient in front of him." Kath raises the alarm they try to revive the patient but are unsuccessful. Kath then reports Nic to DI Archer to clear her name and Nic is arrested for the murders. When Nic is charged with murder Kelly turns her attentions to Kath and begins to take her "frustrations" out on her.

When Kath discovers the truth, Kelly stabs her and leaves her to bleed to death. Zubin Khan (Art Malik) finds Kath and she is rushed to theatre for an operation. They manage to repair the damage and she survives. Writers originally planned to have Kath and Kelly involved in a significant fight scene. But it had to be rewritten because the show had previously received complaints about the stabbing of another character previously. Pearson told Brand that "I think the whole killer storyline went on for an awfully long time, it was a good ending."

=== Departure ===
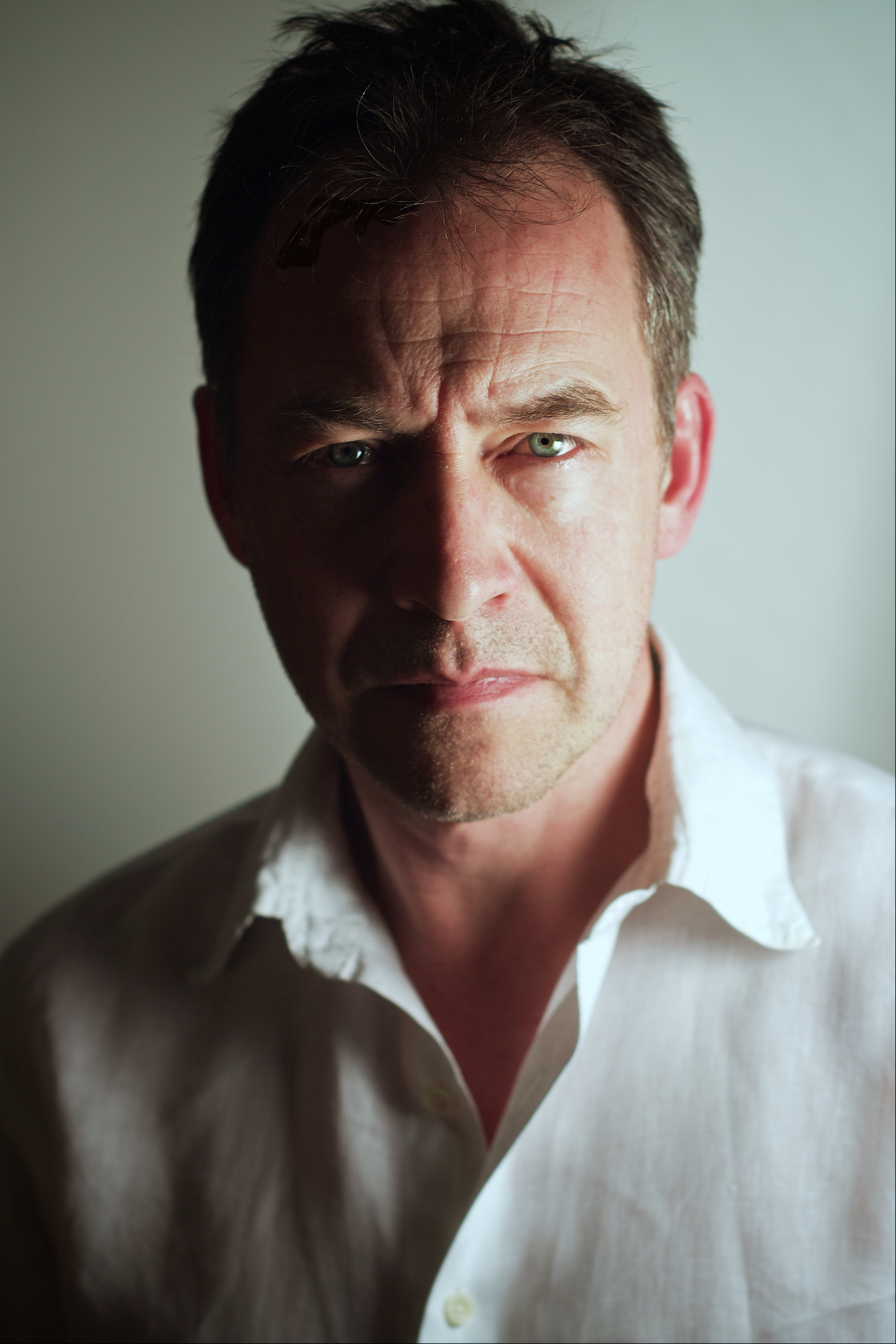
Dominic Mafham plays Kath's final love interest Larry Phillips.

In December 2003, it was announced that Pearson had decided to leave Holby City to pursue other acting projects. Pearson had originally decided to leave one year prior. She felt that the story with Terry was great end to her character. The show's producers did not want the actress to leave and persuaded her to sign another year long contract. Pearson later publicised her reasons for leaving the show, citing too many "ridiculous" stories written for Kath. She told Emma Cox from the Sunday Mirror that "it got to the point where the writers had to keep out-doing themselves. What the hell are you going to do to top the last big storyline with the serial killer? It was in danger of getting silly."

As Kath had long been used in traumatic stories and Pearson asked producers to create a positive departure story for her character. Viewers were still convinced that Kath would be killed off because of her past stories. Pearson told Roz Laws from the Sunday Mercury that "poor Kath, I don't think she's got any insides left after all her operations." At the time of her departure Kath had become one of the show's most popular characters. Pearson observed that "Kath does have a lot of fans, she seems to be everyone's favourite nurse." She added that viewers would be "glad to hear" about the "happy departure" because Kath "deserves it".

In the build up to her final episodes Kath has a "miserable" Christmas spent inside the hospital. Pearson said that Kath would reminisce about her previous festive season shared with Terry and his subsequent suicide. She added that she would be "sad and lonely" and "terrified" of Kelly being placed in the hospital while she recovers from her injuries received from the explosion. Writers then gifted Kath with a new lover named Larry Phillips (Dominic Mafham), a request made by the actress herself. She wanted Kath to leave with an uncomplicated man who was not abusive, dying or unavailable like her ex-partners. However producers did not want Kath to leave the show because of a romance and they reached a compromise. When Mafham joined the cast he believed that Larry would be another "terrible thing" in Kath's life. He told Laws that Larry seemed "too good to be true" and he expected him to "turn and be really horrible and something nasty happen". But the actor stressed "Larry is so nice" and they have a "happy ending as he and Kath go off together."

Kath's final episode saw her receive a job promotion, only for her to decline the offer and begin a new life elsewhere with Larry. Pearson told Claire Brand from Inside Soap that Kath was happy she got the job because "it's a huge promotion and a massive endorsement of her nursing ability." Kath's decision is made final when she treats a patient in an unorthodox way. Pearson believed dealing with the repercussions and her feeling that she wants to leave the progression become too much. Before she departs Kath decides to make amends with Lisa. Pearson explained that "Kath resolves everything with Lisa and, as a Catholic, it is something that has been bothering her for a long time. She did take Terry's life, and she lied about it, so this is a huge weight lifted for her."

== Reception ==
"What about poor old Kath? Free from her abusive husband, and having escaped from a disastrous affair with the medical chaplain, it looked as though she had at last found happiness with Terry. But his cancer has returned and he is too ill to leave hospital to get married. If this story line doesn't have you sniffling, nothing ever will."

— A passage about Kath's bad luck published in the Nursing Standard.

Pearson topped a magazine poll to find out who "the most snoggable woman" in Holby City was. The character's uniform also attracted "saucy fan mail" being sent to Pearson. The Sunday Mirror's Cox said that a series of "barmy plots" drove her out of the show. Laws (Sunday Mercury) said "Holby City's Sister Kath Fox deserves a happy ending after everything she's gone through." In reference to all of Kath's dramatic plots Laws said "Jan was certainly put through the wringer in Holby."

A writer from the Liverpool Echo branded the character "long-suffering Kath" and that her court case was a story that brought the show's credibility into question. A Liverpool Echo journalist said that "however outrageous the storylines may be, at least the cast manage to carry off even the most ridiculous with flair." They noted it was Pearson's turn during the Terry's cancer story. Another opined that Kath and Father Michael's relationship was a story that kept viewers invested in the show. A Daily Mirror columnist chose Kath's return to work following her trial in their "pick of the day" feature. Rupert Smith from The Guardian said that jury only found Kath innocent because of her "noble mien and smart tailoring." Stephen McGinty from The Scotsman likened Kath to "resilient but unhappy nurse" Abby Lockhart (Maura Tierney), a character from the US medical drama ER. He also named her his favourite character, adding she had "concern for patients and strength of character to go beyond restrictive rules."

Claire Stoker from the Liverpool Echo praised Kath's domestic abuse story. She believed the show created "the most moving scenes" with Kath connecting with a fellow battered wife. Stoker added "Jan Pearson's portrayal of Kath is superb." Eddie McIlwaine from the Belfast Telegraph said that Kath is "that nice nurse". A Western Mail reporter branded the character "a lovable nurse" and said viewers always knew she would get away with committing euthanasia.

Television critic Jim Shelley (Daily Mirror) criticised the character over her life choices. He branded Kath a "serial shagger" for her many relationships and quipped that she is "supposedly the morally correct one in the Holby harem." He then questioned her status as a practicing Catholic stating she "admittedly may need more practice". Shelley later profiled the character again, describing her as "a fervent Catholic and ostensibly the most sensible, moral member of Holby's staff." He quipped that "Kath's faith and rectitude" did not prevent her from divorcing, committing adulatory, euthanasia and lying under oath. He was also confused why she did not express her morals in court and was shocked that she was found innocent. He also branded her a murderer thought the scenes which Kelly stabbed "Kath 'The Terminator' Fox" were "fantastic". A writer from the Daily Record opined that Kath and Terry's storyline was depressing Christmas viewing. A colleague believed that Kath was "a tower of strength" for Terry. Rachel Mainwaring (Wales on Sunday) said of Kath and Terry's wedding that "it wasn't quite Kleenex at the ready but it certainly caused a few sniffs." Penny Fray from the Liverpool Daily Post said that viewers could witness "heated scenes" when Kath questions her faith and has an argument with Father Sankar (Patrick Miller). While their colleague chose Kath returning to work following Simon's attack in their "TV highlights" feature.
