= Helen Trent =

Helen Trent may refer to:

- Helen Trent, eponymous character in the US radio series, The Romance of Helen Trent
- Dr. Helen Trent (later Walker), a character in the UK TV series Heartbeat, see List of Heartbeat characters
