= Colin Prockter =

British actor

- Born: 4 June 1946 (age 79); South Norwood, Croydon, London
- Occupation(s): Actor, writer

Colin Prockter (born 4 June 1946) is a British actor and TV writer who has appeared on many TV series and films since the 1960s. Prockter is probably best known for his role as Eddie Maddocks in Coronation Street (2005).

== Filmography ==
=== Film ===
Year	Film	Role	Notes
1974	Ransom	Mike	
1976	Justine	Coeur de Fer	
1989	Precious Bane	Ox-Driver	Television film
1995	Feast of July	Man in Pub	
2009	The Confessor	Father Ray	Short film
2010	Toast	Percy Salt	Television film

=== Television ===
Year	Film	Role	Notes
1969	Z-Cars	Arthur Leach	Episode: "Not That Sort of Policeman"
1969	Parkin's Patch	Harold Anderson	Episode: "Nothing Personal"
1970	The Borderers	Hob	Episode: "Hostage"
1970	A Family at War	Private Galt	Episode: "For Strategic Reasons"
1972	Budgie	Third Jeweller	Episode: "Louie the Ring Is Dead and Buried in Kensal Green Cemetery"
1973	ITV Sunday Night Theatre	Stan	Episode: "Willy"
1973	New Scotland Yard	PC Fleetwood	Episode: "Bullet in a Haystack"
1975	The Sweeney	Stupid Hawes	Episode: "Ringer"
1976	Play for Today	Porter	Episode: "Double Dare"
1976	Chimpmates	Commentator	Episode: "The Big Kick"
1977	The Children of the New Forest	Villager	Episode: "Part 3"
1980	Minder	Stevie	Episode: "Caught in the Act, Fact"
1981	Play for Today	Arthur	Episode: "London Is Drowning"
1981	Goodbye Darling	Second Man	Episode: "Barbara"
1983	Brookside	Detective	Recurring role; 2 episodes
1984	Moonfleet	Greening	Episode: "Let Us Hob And Knob With Death"
1985	Dempsey and Makepeace	John Bates	Episode: "Judgement"
1986	Albion Market	Registrar	Guest role; 1 episode
1989	Minder	Reggie	Episode: "Days of Fines and Closures"
1989	Hannay	Reverend Harker	Episode: "The Good Samaritan"
1989	The Bill	Mr. Burridge	Episode: "Pathways"
1992	Coronation Street	John Halpern	Guest role; 1 episode
1995	Coronation Street	Rodney Bostock	Series regular; 24 episodes
1995	The Famous Five	Coastguard	Episode: "Five on Kirrin Island Again"
1996	In Suspicious Circumstances	Reverend Cotton	Episode: "The Letter Killeth"
1999	Grange Hill	Man with Bicycle	Episode: "Series 22, Episode 8"
1999	Kavanagh QC	Prison Officer	Episode: "The More Loving One"
2001	Doctors	Major Stanley Miller	Episode: "Military Manoeuvers"
2001	The Whistle-Blower	Pater Carey	Miniseries; 2 episodes
2001	The Infinite Worlds of H. G. Wells	Mr. Perkins	Miniseries; 6 episodes
2002	The Bill	Mr. Yardley	Episode: "A Cry for Help"
2002	My Family	Raymond	Episode: "Imperfect Strangers"
2002	Trial & Retribution	Major Giddings	Episode: "Trial & Retribution VI - Part Two"
2003	Casualty	Williams	Episode: "Flight"
2003	Heartbeat	Mr. Arkwright	Episode: "Out of the Blue"
2004	Teachers	Landlord	Recurring role; 2 episodes
2004	My Family	George	Episode: "The Mummy Returns"
2005	Doctor Who	Head Chef	Episode: "The Long Game"
2005	Coronation Street	Eddie Maddocks	Recurring role; 4 episodes
2005	According to Bex	Mr. Rhodes	Episode: "Private Dancer"
2005	Afterlife	Arthur Rose	Episode: "More Than Meets the Eye"
2005	The Bill	Landlord	Episode: "Distraction"
2005	Hex	George the Porter	Episode: "Death Takes the Mother"
2006	Doctors	David Allen	Episode: "Out of the Past"
2006	The Basil Brush Show	Health Inspector	Episode: "The Sweet Smell of Success"
2008	Coronation Street	Clarky	Guest role; 1 episodes
2008	Secret Diary of a Call Girl	Hector Lionheart	Episode: "Series 2, Episode 6"
2008	Doctors	Martin Jones	Episode: "Anger Management"
2009	Heartbeat	Reece	Episode: "School of Hard Knocks"
2010	Rock & Chips	Mr. Johnson	Episode: "Pilot"
2010	Doctor Who	Air Raid Warden	Episode: "Victory of the Daleks"
2012	Mount Pleasant	Stanley	Episode: "Series 2, Episode 4"
2019	Doctors	Bob Steele	Episode: "Frances"
2020	Mister Winner	Carl Bowman	Episode: "The Package"

== Other works ==
Prockter was also one of the co-writers of the 1983 TV series Luna alongside Colin Bennett.
