= Paul Jerricho =

British actor (born 1948)

- Born: Paul Graham Coulthard; 18 November 1948 (age 78); Oswestry, Shropshire, England
- Occupation: Actor
- Years active: 1976–present
- Spouse: Barbara Kinghorn (m. 1981; div. 1984)
- Partner: Helena Little
- Children: 3

Paul Jerricho (born 18 November 1948) is a British actor.

== Early life ==
Brought up in the Caribbean, Jerricho got into the acting bug after playing Joseph in a Nativity play. He received his training at the Drama Centre London.

== Personal life ==
From 1981 to 1984, Jerricho was married to the actress Barbara Kinghorn. He has two daughters and one son named Jack. Currently, the actor is in a relationship with actress Helena Little. He lives in Wimbledon. Barbara Kinghorn died on 2 May 2026 aged 81.

== Filmography ==
=== Film ===
Year	Title	Role	Notes
1978	The Thirty-Nine Steps	P. C. Scott	
1980	The Empire Strikes Back	AT-AT Driver	Uncredited

=== Television ===
Year	Title	Role	Notes
1977	Space: 1999	1st security guard	1 episode
1981	Ladykillers	Montague Morgan	Episode: "A Smile Is Sometimes Worth a Million Dollars"
1981	Grange Hill	Mr. Hicks	1 episode
1981–1983	Triangle	Charles Woodhouse	78 episodes, credited as Paul Jerrico
1983	Doctor Who	The Castellan	serials: "Arc of Infinity" "The Five Doctors"
1990	Howards' Way	Robert Hastings	11 episodes, credited as Paul Jerrico
1992–2000	The Bill	Frank Carey and others	5 episodes
2001, 2005, 2007, 2021	Doctors	Trevor Poulson / Marcus Campbell / Phillip Vardy / Stan Barrett	5 episodes
2004	Holby City	Mr McCoy	Episode: "Braver Soul Than I"
2012	Lewis	Mr Atkins	Episode: "The Soul of Genius"
2014	Casualty	Walter Aitken	Episode: "Born Lucky"
2025	Doctor Who	Pub Landlord	Episode: "Lucky Day"
