= Holby City series 2 =

Holby City
- Series 2
- Starring: Ian Curtis; Jeremy Edwards; Lisa Faulkner; Michael French; Angela Griffin; George Irving; Thusitha Jayasundera; Clive Mantle; Dawn McDaniel; Jan Pearson; Sarah Preston; Nicola Stephenson
- No. of episodes: 16

Release
- Original network: BBC One
- Original release: 25 November 1999 – 9 March 2000

Series chronology
- ← Previous; Series 1 Next → Series 3

The second series of the British medical drama television series Holby City commenced airing in the United Kingdom on BBC One on 25 November 1999, and concluded on 9 March 2000.

== Production ==
Following its first series run of nine 50 minute episodes, the second series of Holby City ran for an extended 16 hour-long episodes. The series aired on BBC One, and moved from Tuesdays to Thursday nights.

== Reception ==
On 22 November 1999, three days before the series première, then director of Channel 4 Gub Neal called for the BBC to cease production of its drama programmes. Neal highlighted Holby City as an example of the station's "safe" programming, denouncing what he perceived to be the abandonment of quality productions in favour of star-led series and "an endless soup of indistinctive programmes".

Reviewing "Search for the Hero", The Guardian's Nancy Banks-Smith commented on the series' casting: "I had the uneasy sensation that I had met half these people before in assorted soap operas. If I am having an emergency Caesarean in economy class, the last person I want to see at the other end of the cleverly improvised coathanger is Cindy's fancy man from EastEnders." Fellow Guardian critic Adam Sweeting criticised the series' writing, observing: "In Holby, no cliché need ever fear being denied admittance." Natasha Joffe, too, was critical of the series' writing, opining that Holby City seemed "a bit soggy" following Nick's departure, and criticising the "Casualty-esque love of didactic plot mirroring" between the doctor and patient storylines.

By February 2000, Holby City had become the only new drama series under BBC One controller Peter Salmon to average more than 9 million viewers. The series saw Griffin win the "Best Actress" award at the 2000 Ethnic Multicultural Media Awards for her role as Jasmine.

== Cast ==
The series featured an ensemble cast of characters in the medical profession. Returning from the show's first series were George Irving as consultant Anton Meyer, Michael French and Dawn McDaniel as registrars Nick Jordan and Kirstie Collins, Lisa Faulkner as senior house officer Victoria Merrick, Sarah Preston and Angela Griffin as ward sisters Karen Newburn and Jasmine Hopkins, Nicola Stephenson as nurse Julie Fitzjohn, and Ian Curtis as senior staff nurse Ray Sykes. The series also introduced Clive Mantle as general surgical consultant Mike Barratt, Jan Pearson as ward sister Kath Shaughnessy, Jeremy Edwards as Kath's son, healthcare assistant Danny Shaughnessy, and Thusitha Jayasundera as general surgical registrar Tash Bandara. Mantle had previously played the same character in Casualty. French departed from the show during the course of the series, and Preston and Curtis did not return for series three. French attributed his departure to the programme becoming "uninteresting and formulaic", commenting: "There should be drama on television which is constantly challenging the audience. Not what the big bosses think will bring in the ratings. Someone has got to be brave and revolutionary."

=== Main characters ===
- Ian Curtis as Ray Sykes (until episode 16)
- Jeremy Edwards as Danny Shaughnessy (from episode 1)
- Lisa Faulkner as Victoria Merrick
- Michael French as Nick Jordan (until episode 14)
- Angela Griffin as Jasmine Hopkins
- George Irving as Anton Meyer
- Thusitha Jayasundera as Tash Bandara (from episode 5)
- Clive Mantle as Mike Barratt (from episode 5)
- Dawn McDaniel as Kirstie Collins
- Jan Pearson as Kath Shaughnessy (from episode 5)
- Sarah Preston as Karen Newburn (until episode 16)
- Nicola Stephenson as Julie Fitzjohn

=== Recurring and guest characters ===
- Alex Avery as Carl (until episode 1)
- Matt Dempsey as Damien Wetherall (episodes 4−10)
- Kwame Kwei-Armah as Fin Newton (episodes 10 and 13)
- Cathy Shipton as Lisa 'Duffy' Duffin (episode 5)

== Episodes ==
No. overall	No. in series	Title	Directed by	Written by	Original release date	Viewers (millions)
10	1	"Search for the Hero"	Michael Owen Morris	Joe Turner	25 November 1999	8.73
After learning that Darwin Ward is going to be split in half to accommodate a new general surgery ward, cardiothoracic consultant Anton Meyer and registrar Nick Jordan return early from a medical conference in Florida. On the flight back to Holby, Eleri (Annette Badland), the woman Nick is sitting next to, experiences a severe bleed. Nick and Meyer discover that she is seven months pregnant, and have to perform a Caesarean in order to stop the bleed. At the hospital, SHO Victoria Merrick flirts with new healthcare assistant Danny Shaughnessy, and registrar Kirstie Collins has an HIV scare when senior staff nurse Ray Sykes accidentally sticks her with a needle which has been used on a HIV positive patient. Kirstie takes a HIV test, which comes back negative. Ward sister Jasmine Hopkins returns to work following her stabbing. She tells her friend, staff nurse Julie Fitzjohn, that she wants an abortion. Julie attempts to deter her, and tells Jasmine's ex-fiancé Carl (Alex Avery) about Jasmine's pregnancy. He angrily confronts Jasmine, who in turn is furious with Julie for telling him. Jasmine accuses Julie of wanting to take her job, before collapsing in pain. Nick and Meyer arrive back at the hospital with Elerie. Despite their ordeal, Meyer insists that Nick takes part in a hospital blood drive, determined that Darwin staff will donate more than the general surgery staff.
11	2	"Puppy Love"	Michael Owen Morris	Len Collin	2 December 1999	8.23
Jasmine experiences a bleed and is admitted as a patient. She and Julie make up, and Julie stays with her as Jasmine miscarries her baby. Ward Sister Karen Newburn visits Jasmine, who asks her if she and Nick, her estranged husband, ever considered having children. Karen admits that the reason she and Nick split up was not his infidelity, as suspected amongst the staff, but because they could not conceive a child. When Ray remarks on the division of Darwin Ward, Karen proposes him as a union representative, seconded by Julie. Following his treatment of a patient on board a plane in "Search for the Hero", Nick is given two complimentary tickets to Paris and a hotel for the weekend by the airline. He asks both Kirstie and Victoria to accompany him, and is turned down each time. Karen is aware that she is his third choice, so strings him along when he asks her, pretending to agree before revealing she will actually be spending the weekend in Rome with her boyfriend Dave.
12	3	"Destination Unknown"	Jim Goddard	Steve Bennett	9 December 1999	8.13
The team races against time to find a donor for a girl in need of a lung transplant and, in the meantime, the patient's wilful sister takes a poorly man waiting for a new heart off on a joyride. At the end of the day the staff unwind at the Christmas party – except for Karen and Nick, whose relationship takes an unexpected turn.
13	4	"You Can Choose Your Friends"	Jim Goddard	Carol Noble	16 December 1999	7.45
Victoria is forced to go against an elderly woman's wishes in order to save her life and Nick discovers he is about to perform surgery on the wrong patient – a man attempting to jump the queue by masquerading as his father and taking his place on the operating table.
14	5	"Knife Edge"	Jamie Annett	Al Hunter Ashton	23 December 1999	8.35
The victim of a racially motivated stabbing is brought in at the same time as his badly wounded attackers and, as police and vengeful relatives create a clamour in the new ward, Nick Jordan pursues Karen, determined to keep his marriage alive. Meanwhile, Kirstie asks Danny for a date, only to find he's waiting for the right moment to approach Victoria.
15	6	"Tidings of Comfort and Joy"	Jamie Annett	Tony McHale	30 December 1999	9.64
Staff are sceptical about a mysterious man who arrives at the hospital carrying a sick woman, and claiming to know the whereabouts of her desperately ill baby. Meanwhile, a drug addict causes problems on the ward, Meyer's future at the hospital seems uncertain, and Nick Jordan decides to spread a little festive cheer.
16	7	"Chasing the Dragon"	Julie Edwards	Sam Wheats	7 January 2000	8.63
A woman in emergency with a heart problem discloses that she is Meyer's sister. Her husband does not like him and does not want Meyer's anywhere near his wife. Nick and Karen are driving when they see a crashed car. In an attempt to rescue the driver, Nick injures his hand.
17	8	"A Marriage of Convenience"	Julie Edwards	Len Collin	13 January 2000	10.08
The woman that Nick saved from the crash is found to have drugs in her system, memory loss and bruising all over. The staff think it is date rape. Nick has surgery on his hand and is told he may never operate again.
18	9	"A Life Worth Saving"	Jamie Annett	Al Hunter Ashton	20 January 2000	8.52
An autistic patient challenges Meyer to a chess game. If Meyer cannot beat him, the man won't have the life-saving heart surgery.
19	10	"Staying Out"	Jamie Annett	Maurice Bessman	27 January 2000	9.47
Julie and Jasmine are at odds over a prisoner. He claims he is innocent to Julie, but Jasmine knows he is guilty and tries to stop Julie from helping him escape.
20	11	"Trust"	Jim Goddard	Niall Leonard	3 February 2000	9.67
Nick Jordan returns to work and spends too much time trying to convince Karen to move back in with him. Just down the hall, a patient is going into cardiac arrest and Jordan is ignoring his pager. When the alarm goes off, he rushes to the patient and starts CPR just before Meyer gets there. The woman dies and her sister threatens to sue the hospital for negligence, and Meyer finds out that Nick did not come when paged.
21	12	"Faith"	Jim Goddard	Al Hunter Ashton	10 February 2000	9.98
The hospital chaplain collapses and needs heart surgery. He loses his faith and his wife refuses to call his estranged daughter for him. Meyer suspends Nick until the negligence hearing. The nurses pull a prank on the hospital maintenance worker.
22	13	"Letting Go"	Kay Patrick	Paul Wheeler	17 February 2000	9.35
A case of mistaken identity causes a death. A love affair between a teacher and her student ends up in the emergency department.
23	14	"Dispossessed"	Kay Patrick	Danny Miller	24 February 2000	9.51
A patient dies of diphtheria and the hospital is on shut down. A 14-year-old girl is gravely ill and only Danny and Jasmine figure out what is wrong with her. On Nick's hearing day, Karen makes a final decision on her marriage, and Nick resigns. Departure of Nick Jordan
24	15	"Taking It on the Chin"	Michael Owen Morris	Jeff Povey	2 March 2000	9.25
Merrick and Barratt tell a young boxer with a faulty heart valve he cannot box any more. A woman with breast cancer suspects her husband is having an affair. Tash discovers a lump in her armpit and is hesitant about seeing a specialist.
25	16	"Into the Woods"	Michael Owen Morris	Jeff Povey	9 March 2000	8.67
The staff go on a character building weekend when Mr. Barratt falls down a steep hill and breaks his leg. A large man loses his spleen because his tiny wife bashed him with an iron. Danny is exposed as a two-timer. Tash gets her cancer results.
