= Mark Simpkin =

English television presenter and entrepreneur

- Born: 18 September 1972 (age 53); Ashton, Cheshire, England
- Occupations: Television Presenter, entrepreneur, actor, model
- Spouse: Tricia Penrose (m. 2003; div. 2021)
- Children: 2

Mark Simpkin (born 18 September 1972) was born in Ashton, Cheshire and is an English television presenter and entrepreneur.

== Lockers and furniture ==
Simpkin began his career selling lockers and changing room equipment to public and private sector clients.

== Property ==
Simpkin's company obtained planning permission to develop the local St Johns Church in Bollington in to 13 apartments. It was originally set to be completed in 2018, but continued economic downturn, and the COVID-19 pandemic led to the site falling into disrepair. A new planning application was submitted in 2022.

After more than a decade of owning the property a large section of the church roof collapsed on the 22nd August 2026. No injuries were reported.

Most recently, Simpkin obtained planning permission for England's largest private natural burial ground in Adlington, Cheshire, in conjunction with the historic Adlington Hall estate.

== Travel ==
Simpkin set up "Simply Luxury Travel", with his wife Tricia Penrose specialising in luxury holidays for footballer, celebrity and high net worth clients.

== Media ==
Simpkin was a presenter for an ITV1 programme called I Want That House, about buying property abroad. He presented over 100 shows, like GMTV's Fashion Police, LK Today, and ITV's This Morning, where he presented a property segment called Property Police. He also presented regular reports for BBC1's Holiday.

Having missed out on a place in boy band Take That, he went into acting, appearing in ITV1's Coronation Street as the character Craig Brennan.

Simpkin had roles in Zig Zag, an educational children's series on BBC2, a live reporter on The Totally Friday Show, the Travel Channel, Carlton Food Network, Manchester United TV and the Granada Regional Newsroom.

Simpkin hosted nationwide youth conferences with Sir Alan Sugar for Lloyds TSB. The road show promoted entrepreneurship in Great Britain.

== Family ==
He was married to actress and singer Tricia Penrose. They have two sons, born in 2003 and 2008. They split in May 2021 after 18 years of marriage.
