= The Whistle-Blower (TV series) =

- Genre: Crime drama
- Written by: Patrick Harbinson
- Directed by: Ben Bolt
- Starring: Amanda Burton; Bill Paterson; Neil Pearson; Penelope Wilton; Emma Cunniffe; Virginia McKenna; Richard Johnson; Indira Varma; Pip Torrens
- Composer: Hal Lindes
- Country of origin: United Kingdom
- Original language: English
- No. of series: 1
- No. of episodes: 2

Production
- Executive producers: Pippa Harris; Jane Tranter
- Producer: Jessica Pope
- Cinematography: Peter Middleton
- Editor: Jerry Leon
- Running time: 90 minutes
- Production company: BBC Worldwide

Original release
- Network: BBC1
- Release: 14 April – 15 April 2001

The Whistle-Blower is a two-part British television drama series, created and written by playwright Patrick Harbinson, first broadcast on BBC1 on 14 April 2001. Billed as the BBC's "Big Easter Drama", the series, which stars Amanda Burton and Bill Patterson, follows Laura Tracey (Burton), a bank employee who places herself and her family in mortal danger after reporting irregularities in her firm's overseas accounts to the National Criminal Intelligence Service. When Laura learns that the transactions relate to a number of South American drug cartels, she and her family are immediately taken into the Witness Protection Programme and relocated.

The series broadcast over two consecutive nights, with the concluding episode following on 15 April 2001. The first episode drew 8.02 million viewers, while the second attracted 7.8 million. The series was released on Region 2 DVD in (Germany) and the Netherlands on 19 June 2012; however, both titles are now out of print.

== Reception ==
Mark Lawson of The Guardian said of the series: "There's a double irony in the fact that the theme of The Whistleblower is deep disguise. The first is that, in its plot essentials, the two-part drama sometimes feels as if it used to be called something else. Specifically, you feel that the idea was born as The Insider, the classy American movie in which Russell Crowe ratted on the tobacco business."

== Cast ==
- Amanda Burton as Laura Tracey
- Bill Paterson as DI Neil Sleighthorne
- Neil Pearson as Dominic Tracey
- Penelope Wilton as Heather Graham
- Emma Cunniffe as Kathy Enfield
- Virginia McKenna as Theresa Elliot
- Richard Johnson as Sir Alastair Montgomery
- Indira Varma as Diane Crossman
- Pip Torrens as Philip Amis
- Ashley Walters as Keith Lindo
- Adam Kotz as Roger Beale
- Colin McFarlane as Bobby De Luca
- Charlotte Salt as Sasha Tracey
- Zach Grenier as Louis T. Weitzman
- Liam Hess as Daniel Tracey
- Martin Ledwith as Vincent Shearer
- Madeleine Potter as Caroline Dupress
- Claire Price as Emily Shearer
- Colin Prockter as Pater Carey
- Christopher Robbie as Judge Eglee
- Vincent Rubio as Tomas Negrete
- Angus Wright as Damien Sutton

== Episodes ==
No.	Title	Directed by	Written by	Airdate	UK viewers (million)
1	"Episode 1"	Ben Bolt	Patrick Harbinson	14 April 2001	8.02
A woman places her family in danger when she blows the whistle on a drugs operation in the bank where she works.
2	"Episode 2"	Ben Bolt	Patrick Harbinson	15 April 2001	7.80
Sir Alistair files an appeal, claiming Laura was having an affair with Shearer.
