= Steven Blakeley =

British actor

Steven Blakeley (born 26 February 1982) is a British actor. He is best known for his role as PC Geoff Younger in the British police drama Heartbeat, guest roles in various other television programmes and multiple theatre roles.

== Early life ==
Steven Blakeley was born in Chesterfield, Derbyshire in 1982 and was brought up in the Derbyshire mining town of Bolsover.

He attended the Bolsover School, and was initially interested in pursuing a medical career, before turning his attentions to performing.

== Career ==
Blakeley started his career as a member of the Derby Playhouse Community and Youth Theatre companies, before going on to work professionally at Derby Playhouse. He trained as an actor at the Royal Scottish Academy of Music and Drama in Glasgow and at the Athanor Academy in Germany. His theatre credits include national tours of Peter Shaffer's The Private Ear and The Public Eye, Dry Rot and Funny Peculiar, Diary of a Nobody at the Royal and Derngate, Boeing-Boeing, Selling the Sizzle, Bare Words, A Midsummer Night's Dream, Peter Pan, The Hypochondriac, Soap and Cold Turkey.

As well as appearing in four series of ITV's Heartbeat, he has made guest appearances in ITV's Emmerdale, Doctors and Holby City (the latter two both for the BBC). Blakeley has performed in radio plays for the BBC, as well as providing narration for animation films and poetry recordings. In 2006, he was a nominee in the category of Best Newcomer at the National Television Awards, and nominated for the 2016 Offie for Best Supporting Male Performer for his portrayal of Comrade Staggles in J. B. Priestley's The Roundabout at the Park Theatre, London. He played the same role when the production transferred to New York in 2017. Blakeley played Puck in A Midsummer Night's Dream and Verges in Much Ado About Nothing with the British Shakespeare Company on their 2009 tour of the United Kingdom, Dublin, Norway and Prague.

Blakeley has also worked as a writer and theatre director. Since 2009, he has appeared in, written and directed several pantomimes at the Theatre Royal Windsor, playing the pantomime dame in Cinderella, Sleeping Beauty, Aladdin and Jack and the Beanstalk. In 2010, he was acting at Derby Theatre.

Blakeley appeared in ITV's Coronation Street and the BBC's Suffragettes with Lucy Worsley in 2018. In 2020, he appeared in the All Creatures Great and Small episode "All's Fair" as Mr. Foyle.

Blakeley is also now a civil celebrant and funeral director working for A.Wass in Mansfield.
