= Lisa Kay =

English actress

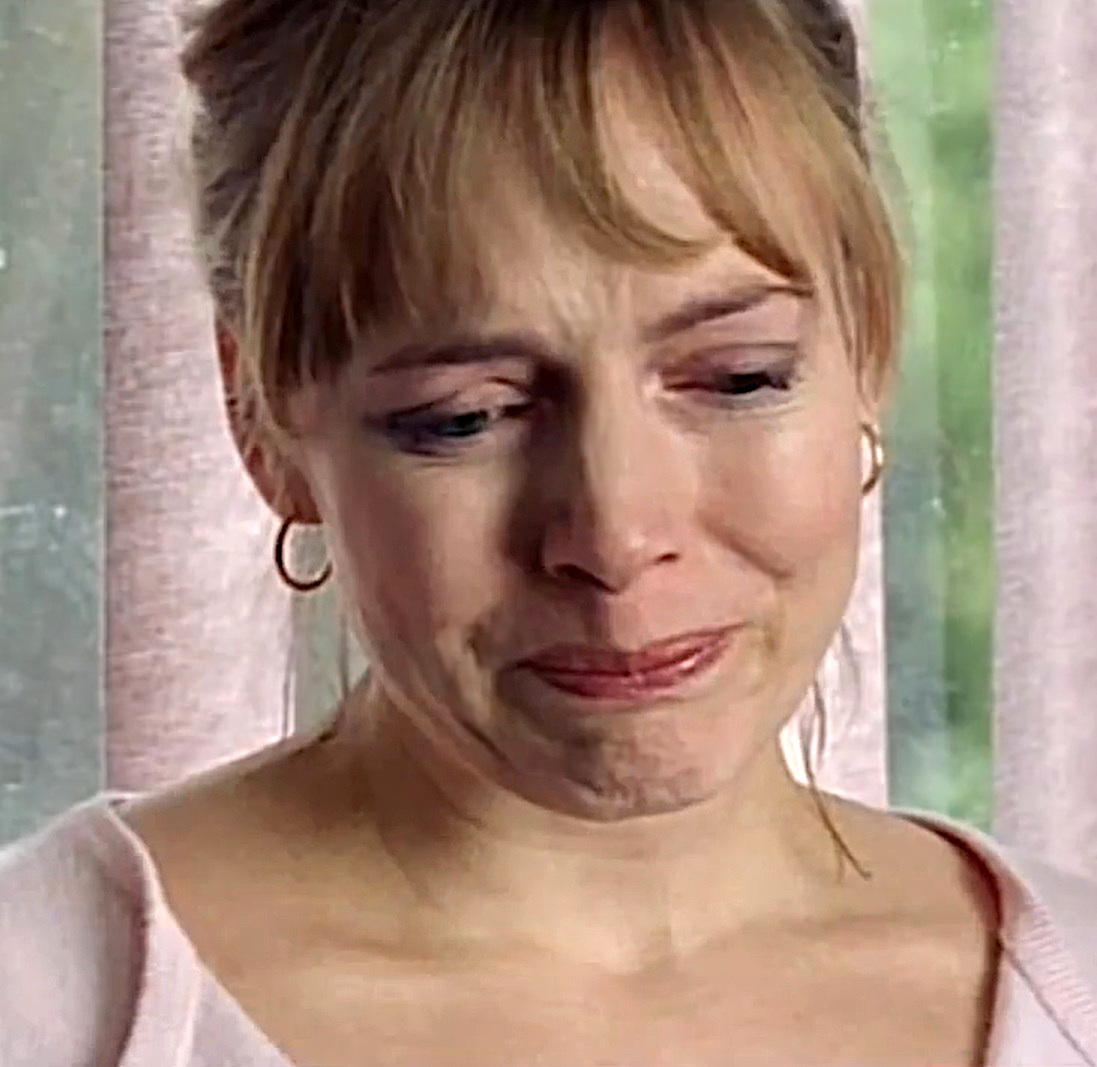
- Kay in The Murder Room (2004)
- Born: 11 February 1971 (age 55); Beverley, East Riding of Yorkshire, England
- Occupation: Actress
- Years active: 1998–present

Lisa Kay (born 11 February 1971) is an English actress who has also worked in Australia. Her credits include Chicken Run (2000), Bridget Jones's Diary (2001), Heartbeat (2002-2010), Foyle's War (2003), Corpse Bride (2005), Breaking and Entering (2006), Home and Away (2018), Neighbours (2018), and All My Friends Are Racist (2021).

== Early life and education ==
Kay was born on 11 February 1971 in Beverley, East Riding of Yorkshire. She grew up in Levisham on the North York Moors. Kay trained as a ballet dancer from a young age, with a scholarship at the Royal Ballet School, London for 3 years, until knee injury ended her aspirations. She changed path toward acting, taking a three-year course at Bristol Old Vic Theatre School.

== Career ==
=== UK ===
In 2001, Kay appeared as Eleanor Ross Heaney in the romantic comedy film Bridget Jones's Diary, in a cast which included Renee Zellweger, Hugh Grant, Colin Firth and Jim Broadbent.

In 2004, Kay made her television debut in the episode "Wrecked" of ITV1's Heartbeat. She played the character of Emma Bryden, a lonely single mother who forms a friendship with PC Phil Bellamy. She became a cast regular playing Nurse Carol Cassidy from 2006 to 2010. Kay appeared in the episode "Among the few" (series 2 episode 2) playing Connie Dewar, a driver at a fuel depot, in ITV's Foyle's War.

In 2006, she starred alongside Jude Law and Ray Winstone in the Anthony Minghella directed romantic drama film Breaking and Entering (2006).

=== Voice acting ===
Her voice credits include Nick Park's Chicken Run (2000), and Tim Burton's Corpse Bride (2005).

=== Australia ===
Kay appeared in the Australian soap Home and Away for two episodes in 2018 as Professor Juliet Pickford. Also in 2018 she appeared in Neighbours as Rita Newland.

In 2021 she appeared in the award-winning ABC iview comedy series All My Friends Are Racist. The five-part series was written by Kodie Bedford and directed by Bjorn Stewart, and also starred Leah Purcell, Davey Thompson, and Tuuli Narkle.
