= Hywel Simons =

Welsh actor (born 1970)

- Born: 10 February 1970 (age 56); Porthcawl, Wales, United Kingdom
- Education: London Academy of Music and Dramatic Art (LAMDA)
- Occupation: Actor
- Spouse: Sarah Tansey (2005–present)

Hywel Simons (born 10 February 1970) is a Welsh actor from Porthcawl, Wales. He is best known for playing Sergeant Craig Gilmore in the long-running ITV police drama The Bill (2001–2004).

== Early life and education ==
Simons was born and raised in Porthcawl, Bridgend County Borough, Wales. He began acting as a pupil at Porthcawl Comprehensive School before studying at the London Academy of Music and Dramatic Art (LAMDA).

== Career ==
Simons made his television debut in 1993 as oil-rig worker Wilf Granelli in the drama series Roughnecks. He later appeared in Little Britain as Glynn, a gay vicar.

In 2013 he played Torvald in Ibsen's A Doll’s House at the Royal Lyceum.

Simons has also appeared in Dreamland (2023) and BBC’s Wolf (2023). In September 2025, Simons was cast as Jim Griffiths in the upcoming film The Man with the Plan, directed by Christine Edzard.

== Personal life ==
Simons married actress Sarah Tansey in August 2005. He enjoys wood carving and uses a lathe to make bowls out of driftwood he finds on beaches.
