= Peter Benson (actor) =

English actor (1943–2018)

- Peter Benson as Bernie Scripps in Heartbeat
- Born: Peter Henry Benson; 3 April 1943; Wallasey, Cheshire, England
- Died: 6 September 2018 (aged 75); Liverpool
- Occupation: Actor
- Years active: 1961–2013

Peter Henry Benson (3 April 1943 – 6 September 2018) was a British actor, best known for his role as Bernie Scripps in the ITV television series Heartbeat, a police drama set in the fictional Yorkshire village of Aidensfield during the 1960s. He also had a number of other film and television roles, often playing weak or vacillating characters.

== Television and theatre ==
Born in Wallasey in Cheshire, the son of schoolmaster Herbert George Benson (1888–1972), who served as a Special Constable during World War II, and Mabel Dorothy (née Lord, 1902–1979), Peter Benson was a talented singer and dancer and an accomplished theatre actor. His other television and theatre work included the regional premiere of Stephen Sondheim's Assassins. On television his credits include the Dauphin in Shaw's Saint Joan, Henry VI in all three parts of Henry VI, and Richard III for the BBC Television Shakespeare Series, Reuben with Bill Maynard in Alan Plater's Trinity Tales, Henry VII in The Black Adder, Bernard in All Creatures Great and Small, and Bor in the Doctor Who serial Terminus. Later roles included the made-for-TV film Merlin and A Touch of Frost.

He also had parts in Coronation Street, The Royal, Rumpole of the Bailey, Jeeves and Wooster, The Bill, Peak Practice, Casualty, Tenko, and Lovejoy, among others.

Benson played the part of Larry Rigg in Granada's short lived market soap, Albion Market, from 1985 to 1986.

He played Bernie Scripps in Heartbeat between 1995 and 2010. In the series, Bernard 'Bernie' Scripps ran Aidensfield Garage and the local funeral service. He was often involved helping Claude Greengrass (Bill Maynard), his half-brother Vernon Scripps (Geoffrey Hughes), and later Peggy Armstrong (Gwen Taylor) with disastrous money-making schemes.

== Film roles ==
His film work included roles in Cry of the Banshee (1970), Michael Crichton's The First Great Train Robbery (1978), Roman Polanski's Tess (1979), and Christian Cantamessa's Air (2015).

== Death ==
Benson died on 6 September 2018 aged 75, following a relatively short illness. He was surrounded by family and close friends.

== Filmography ==
| Year | Title | Role | Notes |
|---|---|---|---|
| 1969 | Putney Swope | Mr. Jingle | |
| 1970 | Cry of the Banshee | Brander | |
| 1978 | The Shout | Harry the Shepherd | |
| 1978 | The Sailor's Return | Charlie Nye | |
| 1978 | The First Great Train Robbery | Station Despatcher | |
| 1979 | Tess | Religious Fanatic | |
| 1980 | Hawk the Slayer | Black Wizard | |
