= Parkin's Patch =

British TV police series (1969–1970)

- Genre: Crime
- Written by: Troy Kennedy Martin; Ian Kennedy Martin; Elwyn Jones; Nick McCarty
- Directed by: Raymond Menmuir; Michael Apted; Stephen Frears; Mike Newell
- Starring: John Flanagan; Heather Page; Gareth Thomas; Robert Urquart
- Country of origin: United Kingdom
- Original language: English
- No. of series: 1
- No. of episodes: 26

Production
- Producer: Terence Williams
- Running time: 30 minutes
- Production company: Yorkshire Television

Original release
- Network: ITV
- Release: 19 September 1969 – 20 March 1970

Parkin's Patch is a Yorkshire Television production that aired on ITV from 1969 to 1970. John Flanagan played PC Moss Parkin, a police constable in the North York Moors. The series was filmed in the North York Moors as well as certain scenes being shot in Leeds, including parts around the Farm Hill estate in Meanwood.

== Cast ==
- John Flanagan as Moss Parkin
- Heather Page as Beth Parkin
- Gareth Thomas as Ron Radley
- Robert Urquart as Chief Superintendent Atkinson
- John Malcolm as Mr. Reid
- Michael Robbins as Parry
- Malcolm Rogers as Collator
- Colin Prockter as Harold Anderson
- Len Jones as Terry
- Jack MacGowran as Danny Shea
- Keith Buckley as Peter Whiteside
- David Daker as Sergeant Milburn
- Tony Beckley as Curry
- Wallas Eaton as Moggs
- Ronald Lacey as Elliot
- Pauline Collins as Doreen Ashworth
- David Lodge as Sergeant Eldridge
- Joe Gladwin as Joe Shields
- Mona Washbourne as Mrs. Jackson
- Peter Sallis as Detective Chief Inspector Mitchem

== Reception ==
=== Critical response ===
A. E., of the Birmingham Mail, praised the series for its particular charm, noting that it remained intact despite a move from an early Saturday slot to a later time on Fridays.
