= Mark Jordon =

English actor

- Born: Mark Jordon; 25 January 1965 (age 61); Oldham, Lancashire, England
- Occupations: Actor, director, producer
- Years active: 1983–present
- Spouse(s): Siobhan Finneran (m. 1997; div. 2014) Laura Norton (2015–present)
- Children: 4

Mark Jordon (born 25 January 1965) is a British actor, best known for playing PC Phil Bellamy in the ITV period police drama Heartbeat from its start in 1992 until he left the role in 2007. A documentary, Heartbeat – Farewell Phil, was broadcast on Christmas Day,

Jordon made his directoral debut with the short film To The Sea Again, which played at many festivals, making it to the final of the Angel Film Festival London and Moondance International Film Festival in Hollywood.

On 8 July 2014, Jordon joined the cast of Emmerdale in the short term role of Daz Spencer. He reprised the role in August 2017, becoming a regular cast member until 31 January 2019, with a brief appearance on 20 December 2024.

He is also known for his guest role as Connor Colman in BBC medical drama Holby City, and as Ray Wood in ITV's The Long Shadow.

Jordon's wife is his former Emmerdale colleague Laura Norton, alongside whom he also appeared in the ITV reality show Drama Queens.

== Personal life ==
Jordon married actress Siobhan Finneran in 1997; they divorced in 2014. They have two children together.

His current wife is Emmerdale co-star Laura Norton. On 24 August 2020, it was announced that the couple were expecting their first child. On 29 January 2021, Norton gave birth to a son named Jesse. In November 2022, she gave birth to their daughter.

In July 2018, Jordon was arrested on suspicion of assault, when an argument in a pub spilled over to a fight on the street. In October 2018, he was charged with grievous bodily harm and assault. In November 2018, Jordon pleaded not guilty and was granted unconditional bail until his trial. In August 2019, he was found not guilty of all charges.

== Filmography ==
Year	Title	Role	Note
1984–1985	How We Used to Live	Dave/Sentry	TV series (5 episodes)
1985	Seaview	Ian	TV series (1 episode: "Growing Pains")
1985	Number One	Hooligan	Film
1986	EastEnders	Youth	TV series (1 episode)
1986	Strike It Rich!	Grolly	TV series (4 episodes)
1986	Scene		TV series (1 episode: "Too Nice By Half!")
1987–1988	Coronation Street	PC Wilson	TV series (4 episodes)
1989	4 Play	Des	TV series (1 episode: "Dawn and the Candidate")
1990	Shoot to Kill	D.S. Keith Farrington	TV film
1990	Made in Heaven	Malcolm	TV series (1 episode: "A Fair Mix Up")
1990	All Creatures Great and Small	PC Hicks	TV series (1 episode: "Food for Thought")
1990	Medics	Steve	TV series (1 episode: "Annie")
1991	Waterfront Beat		TV series (1 episode: "Acid Ship")
1991	The Case-Book of Sherlock Holmes	George	TV series (1 episode: "The Boscombe Valley Mystery")
1991	Bread	Wagger	TV series (1 episode: "Episode No. 7.6")
1992–2007	Heartbeat	PC Phil Bellamy	TV series (series regular, 324 episodes)
1994	Earthfasts	PC Hunter	TV series (1 episode: "Episode No. 1.1")
2003–2004	The Royal	PC Phil Bellamy	TV series (10 episodes)
2009	Casualty	Tim Holdsworth	TV series (1 episode: "Not Wisely But Too Well")
2012	Hollyoaks	Mr Sykes	TV series (2 episodes)
2013	Doctors	Darren Compton	TV series (1 episode "Through a Glass Darkly")
2013	Casualty	Richard Patterson	TV series (1 episode "You Always Hurt The One You Love")
2014	Halcyon Heights	Rupert	Film
2014	Coronation Street	Graham Naisby	TV series (2 episodes)
2014	Rocket's Island	Peter	TV series (13 episodes)
2014, 2017–2019, 2024	Emmerdale	Daz Spencer	TV series (series regular, 161 episodes)
2017	Casualty	Harry Beatty	TV series (1 episode, "Sleeping with the Enemy")
