= Waterfront Beat =

British TV crime drama series, 1990–1991

- Title card
- Genre: Police procedural
- Created by: Phil Redmond
- Written by: Phil Redmond; Andy Lynch
- Directed by: Various
- Starring: John Ashton; Rupert Frazer; Geoffrey Leesley; Denis Lill; Brian McCardie; Helena Little; Stuart Golland; Jane Hazlegrove; Bruce Alexander; Ray Polhill; Damien Walker
- Theme music composer: Steve Wright
- Country of origin: United Kingdom
- Original language: English
- No. of series: 2
- No. of episodes: 16

Production
- Producer: Phil Redmond
- Production locations: Liverpool, England
- Cinematography: Graham Brown
- Running time: 50 minutes
- Production company: BBC Studios

Original release
- Network: BBC1
- Release: 6 January 1990 – 20 February 1991

Waterfront Beat is a BBC television police procedural drama series, broadcast between 6 January 1990 and 20 February 1991.

== Background ==
The series follows the work of a group of police detectives stationed in a new Waterfront division, based in the Liverpool docks, "taking a closer look at the way one non-metropolitan, urban police force comes to terms with economic regeneration by reorganising it's City Division, in turn creating a separate Inner City Waterfront Division". As well as the usual police procedural elements, the series also explores "aspects of police work not normally featured", including policy group meetings, budget and planning summits, with a number of long-running story arcs, all in an attempt to "disabuse us of the notion that TV crime is always cracked in 50 minutes."

The series was created by writer Phil Redmond, famed for his work on Channel 4 soap Brookside. Redmond was brought on board to pen the series as an attempt to rival ITV's The Bill, the first of many attempts between 1990 and 2008.

A total of sixteen episodes were broadcast over the course of two series. The programme featured a large ensemble cast, with John Ashton, Rupert Frazer, Geoffrey Leesley, Denis Lill and Brian McCardie leading the cast throughout both series. Since broadcast, the series has been rarely repeated, and has never been released on any form of home media.

== Cast ==
=== Main ===
- John Ashton as Detective Chief Supt. Don Henderson
- Rupert Frazer as Supt. Peter Fallows
- Geoffrey Leesley as Det. Supt. Frank Mathews
- Denis Lill as Assistant Chief Constable (Ops)
- Owen Teale as DS Mike McCarthy (Series 1)
- Mark Moraghan as DS Don 'Macker' McVay (Series 2)
- Helena Little as WDC Jane Long
- Eve Bland as WDS Jackie Byrnes (Series 2; guest Series 1)
- Roger Walker as DI Cyril Jacobs (Series 2)
- Brian McCardie as PC Ronnie Barker
- Philip Middlemiss as PC Barry Smith (Series 1)
- Richard Good as PC Bob 'Snake' Nelson (Series 2)
- Jane Hazlegrove as WPC Madeline Forrest
- Ray Polhill as PC 'Jacko' Jackbridge
- Gordon Cameron as PC Jeff Morgan
- Stuart Golland as Sgt. Trevor Simon
- Bruce Alexander as Chief Supt. Alan Briscoe

=== Recurring ===
- Tommy Boyle as Denny Hagland; an organised car thief. (recurring Series 1; guest Series 2)
- Dean Williamson as Gerry Darcey; freelance journalist.
- James McKenna as Gerry Cookson; media liaison.
- Martin Matthews as Brian Dawes; building services. (recurring Series 1; guest Series 2)
- Denise Stephenson as June Henderson; Don's wife. (Series 1)
- Damien Walker as Tony Henderson; Don's step-son.
- Catriona McColl as Margaret Fallows; Peter's wife.
- Lesley Nicol as Barbara Matthews; Frank's wife.
- Gillian Kearney as Helen Collins; Ronnie's love interest. (Series 2)
- Kulvinder Ghir as PC Ashir Malek; a new ethnic recruit. (Series 2)
- Leila Betrand as WPC Beverley Williams; a new ethnic recruit. (Series 2)

== Episodes ==
=== Series 1 (1990) ===
No.	Title	Directed by	Written by	British air date
1	"Day Zero"	Richard Standeven	Phil Redmond	6 January 1990
A stolen car racket and a murder inquiry are the least of problems for the new Divisional Commander, Don Henderson, who arrives on his first day at the unit to find that not only is his new office inaccessible, but that the whole building is derelict. Meanwhile, new probationary PC Ronnie Barker arrives for his first day on the job.
2	"Hard Cheese"	Romey Allison	Phil Redmond	13 January 1990
Ronnie discovers his first body - or so he thinks. CID deal with a hijack at a bio-engineering factory, but Mike is convinced the factory owner knows more than he is letting on. Henderson gets attacked across the conference room table, and is forced to cut lunch with June short after the hijack situation takes an interesting turn.
3	"Wild Things"	Ken Horn	Phil Redmond	20 January 1990
Mike and Jane are forced to put the Hagland enquiry to one side to help out on the hunt for a gang of sheep rustlers. Ronnie gets his first arrest, much to the dismay of Smithy.
4	"Tied Up"	Ken Horn	Phil Redmond	27 January 1990
After a motor cruiser is almost hit by bin bags thrown from a bridge, the investigation into the bin bag killer intensifies, leading CID to mount a surveillance operation - which is scuppered by an ambitious local journalist. Ronnie isn't best pleased when he realises his new bike is disappearing bit by bit.
5	"Under the Knuckle"	Richard Bramall	Phil Redmond	3 February 1990
A fraud squad raid leads the station to become overrun with paperwork, and provides Smithy the perfect opportunity to further wind up Ronnie. Don goes toe-to-toe with a local journalist. Madeline tries to divert Smithy's attention. CID are alerted when it appears Denny Hagland is up to his old tricks again.
6	"Big Fish"	Ken Horn	Phil Redmond	10 February 1990
A paedophile attempting to lure children away from their guardians leads Ronnie and Smithy on a merry chase. Mike and Jane track Denny Hagland to the location of the stolen cars, but once again, he manages to make good his escape, until Mike comes up with a cunning plan. Don and June have a dinner date with the Fallows.
7	"Covert Operations"	Richard Standeven	Phil Redmond	17 February 1990
The body of a young woman is found naked and posed in a skip, raising the question of whether the bin bag murderer changed his MO? Frank tries to negotiate a deal with Denny Hagland, who threatens to sue for damaged caused to his boat. A series of armed robberies on wine stores leads Mike and Jane all the way to the Lake District.
8	"Homeboy"	Richard Bramall	Phil Redmond	24 February 1990
Realising the skip murderer has a penchant for women in uniform, CID mount a sting, with Madeline as the bait, a fact which Smithy isn't too pleased about. Ronnie attends his first ever court hearing, only for the case to be adjourned. Just as progress on the division begins to gather pace, Don receives some devastating news.

=== Series 2 (1991) ===
No.	Title	Directed by	Written by	British air date
1	"Pirates"	Robert Gabriel	Phil Redmond	2 January 1991
An old school pirating scam operating on the river keeps CID busy, as newly transferred DS 'Macker' McVay hatches a plan to catch the culprits. Don returns to operational duties for the first time following his wife's death, and Jackie and Jane are seconded to the drugs squad to help trail boutique owner Geraldine O'Toole.
2	"Microlights"	A.J. Quinn	Phil Redmond	9 January 1991
Ronnie finds himself staring down the barrel of a shotgun when confronting an armed robber, whom CID discover is using a microlight to flee the scene. Jane and Jackie continue their surveillance of Geraldine O'Toole. Outside of work, Ronnie continues his dogged pursuit of Helen, and finally manages to ask her out.
3	"Repossessions"	Chris Lovett	Andy Lynch	16 January 1991
West Lancashire building society become the subject of a number of targeted attacks. Meanwhile, an elderly couple arrive home to their flat to find the locks have been changed. Discovering the two cases are linked, CID try to get to the bottom of matters. Macker suspects the bank manager is somehow involved.
4	"Stake Out"	Robert Gabriel	Andy Lynch	23 January 1991
Another 'bin bag' body turns up in the river, weighed down with a metal balance traced to a local building site. Macker, Jackbridge and Morgan go undercover, and arrest a man who flees after dumping a bin bag, only to find not only was he simply stealing brass tap fittings, he is also an undercover IRA operative.
5	"EPOS"	A.J. Quinn	Phil Redmond	30 January 1991
An armed robbery takes place at a DIY store where the fraud squad have a surveillance operation running, which results in CID using the raid as an excuse to go undercover to catch the perpetrators. Meanwhile, Ronnie begins his training to go undercover with the racists following the attack on PC Malek.
6	"Pickup"	Brian Morgan	Phil Redmond	6 February 1991
A young girl's body washes up on the beach, which leads to suspicion that she may be the latest victim of the bin bag murderer. Ronnie, now deep undercover, is forced to help carry out a series of attacks on Pakistani newsagents. Jane and Frank head to Greece in an attempt to collar Denny Hagland.
7	"Acid Ship"	Chris Lovett	Andy Lynch	13 February 1991
A beach murder leads Jackie and Jane to an offshore acid party, leading the drugs squad to go partying undercover for a raid, but things don't go according to plan. Ronnie is finding the pressure too great after infiltrating a gang of right-wing extremists.
8	"Dilemma"	A.J. Quinn	Phil Redmond	20 February 1991
The division are pleased with an important breakthrough in the bin-bag murders. DS McVay has a theory about stolen corpses, and Ronnie confronts the racists.
