= Justice (2011 TV series) =

- Genre: Legal drama
- Created by: Colin McKeown
- Starring: Robert Pugh; Gillian Kearney; Tom Georgeson; Gary Mavers; Jake Abraham; Jodie Comer; Ellie Paskell; Tricia Penrose; Louis Emerick
- Opening theme: "This Town" by Frank Sinatra
- Country of origin: United Kingdom
- Original language: English
- No. of series: 1
- No. of episodes: 5

Production
- Executive producer: Colin McKeown
- Producers: Colin McKeown; Liam Keelan
- Running time: 45 minutes
- Production company: LA Productions

Original release
- Network: BBC One
- Release: 4 April – 8 April 2011

Justice is a British five-part legal drama, starring Robert Pugh and Gillian Kearney, that was broadcast from 4 to 8 April 2011, on BBC One. Pugh stars as Judge Patrick Coburn, the officiate of a community justice centre in his childhood home of Dovefield in Liverpool. Kearney stars as Louise Scanlon, a local investigative journalist who becomes caught up in Coburn's efforts to bring local tearaway Jake Little (Jake Abraham) to justice.

As well as featuring individual stories, the series features an ongoing story arc throughout all five episodes. As well as looking at the work of the justice centre, plotlines also look at Coburn's troubled past and the relationship with parish priest Father Jim Kelly (Tom Georgeson). The series was released on Region 1 DVD on 25 October 2011. No further series of Justice were commissioned, due to then-BBC1 controller Danny Cohen claiming that there were "too many crime dramas on TV", and axing it alongside other BBC crime dramas, including Zen.

== Cast ==
- Robert Pugh as Judge Patrick Coburn
- Gillian Kearney as Louise Scanlon
- Tom Georgeson as Father Jim Kelly
- Gary Mavers as Joe Gateacre
- Jake Abraham as Jake Little
- Jodie Comer as Sharna Mulhearne
- Ellie Paskell as Kaz Kenny
- Tricia Penrose as Hayley Gosling
- Louis Emerick as Patrick "PD" Dempsey
- Glenn Wild as Adam

== Episodes ==
No.	Title	Directed by	Written by	Original release date
1	"This Town"	Ian Barber	Nick Leather	4 April 2011
The Public Justice Centre in Dovefield, Liverpool is at the frontline of Broken Britain and represents a groundbreaking approach to law and order – but when the fledgling centre is broken into and a devastating memo from the Ministry of Justice disappears, Judge Patrick Coburn (Robert Pugh) must confront his demons and attempt to win over the local community before it’s too late. Local reporter Louise Scanlon (Gillian Kearney) is brought in to interview Coburn, and he realises that he has to get out of the centre and start engaging with the locals. At the Crown Court, the latest case against local hoodlum Jake Little (Jake Abraham) is thrown out when key witness Sharna Mulhearn (Jodie Comer) doesn't show up. Coburn visits his old church for the first time in forty years and is astonished to find Father Jim Kelly (Tom Georgeson) is still there.
2	"Like Father, Like Son"	Ian Barber	Shaun Duggan	5 April 2011
Coburn struggles to establish his credibility as local reporter Louise continues to dig into his past. A young drug dealer comes up before the Judge, providing the perfect opportunity for Coburn to demonstrate zero tolerance – but will he take it? Questions over the handling of the case lead to a surprise confession. Kaz (Ellie Paskell) is drawn further and further into Jake's world. Meanwhile, Coburn is happy to receive delivery of a new bike.
3	"There But for the Grace of God"	Mark Heller	Esther Wilson	6 April 2011
Judge Coburn and Joe Gateacre (Gary Mavers) attempt to reach out to the community, but discover that most don’t want to be reached. Joe insists that Coburn must come clean before someone discovers his secret. Coburn's approach is troubled when shop-lifting pensioner Alice refuses offers of help. Meanwhile, drug user Angie makes Coburn reassess his attitude to street crime. He discovers that many of the community’s problems have the same root - Jake Little. Coburn and Father Jim finally start to talk about the past, and Coburn makes a shocking discovery.
4	"The Secret's Out"	Noreen Kershaw	Alice Nutter	7 April 2011
Louise presses Coburn for the truth, but he refuses to pay ball. Coburn comes face to face with his nemesis, Jake Little. Coburn’s unusual sentencing draws more criticism, and Louise finally publishes her scandalous headline. Coburn ignores advice again, leaving Joe feeling sidelined.
5	"Last Call for Love"	Noreen Kershaw	Nick Leather	8 April 2011
When Jake Little is charged with arson, the staff at the Public Justice Centre have the chance to take him off the streets for good – but even though half the community appears to have seen Jake at the scene of the crime, no-one is prepared to speak up. Coburn and Joe find themselves desperately searching for the one good man or woman who can finally turn the tide in their direction.
