= Tricia Penrose =

English actress and singer

- Born: Patricia Penrose; 9 April 1970 (age 56); Kirkby, Lancashire, England
- Other name: Trisha Penrose
- Occupations: Actress; singer; businesswoman
- Years active: 1985–present
- Spouse(s): Mark Simpkin (m. 2003; div. 2021) Chris Hargreaves (m. 2026)
- Children: 2
- Website: https://www.triciapenrose.co.uk

Patricia Penrose (born 9 April 1970) is an English actress, singer and businesswoman, known as Tricia Penrose. She is best known for her role as Gina Ward in ITV's long-running 1960s drama Heartbeat, a role she played continuously for 17 years from 1993 to 2010. She has also appeared on The Royal, Coronation Street, Emmerdale, Boon, Justice, Fort Boyard, The Bill and Dancin' Thru the Dark. As well as her acting roles, she has had her own show on Radio Wirral and since 2021 has been working on some shows for BBC Radio 4.

== Singing career ==
Although primarily focused on her acting career, Penrose has also had an interest in the music industry, releasing two singles – "Where Did Our Love Go?" (1996, UK No. 71) and "Don't Wanna Be Alone" (2000, UK No. 44). In 2002, she reached the final of A Song for Europe (the competition to select the UK's Eurovision Song Contest entry) but did not win. In 2004, however, she won a Christmas edition of the ITV show Stars in Their Eyes, performing as Brenda Lee and singing "Rockin' Around the Christmas Tree". She previously appeared in the show as Lisa Stansfield. She has also sung a number of times on Heartbeat, her character Gina won a talent contest in an episode in series 2, with her version of the Lulu hit "Shout".

== Acting career ==
Penrose's first television role was in 1985 as Ruth in Brookside. She then appeared in the soap opera in 1988 as WPC Emma Reid. In 1987 she appeared in the "A Ride on the Wild Side" episode of Boon as Lindy Yates, before a cast role in 1988's Vroom. Penrose appeared in a 1990 episode of Medics as the character Jean and in the same year had a part in Dancin' Thru the Dark. She appeared in Emmerdale in 1991 as Louise and then in two episodes of Coronation Street in 1991–92.

Penrose's appearance as Carol the Barmaid in 1993's Terraces was followed by her longest running role as Gina Ward in Heartbeat where she appeared in more than 300 episodes between 1993 and the series final episode in 2010, making her the longest serving female cast member.

Penrose is a supporter of the annual Heartbeat car rally, which is held in Goathland. Penrose also appeared (as Gina Ward) in two episodes of the Heartbeat spin-off The Royal in 2003. In 2011 Penrose appeared as Hayley Gosling in the British legal drama Justice.

== Celebrity appearances ==
In 2001, Penrose appeared on Lily Savage's Blankety Blank. In 2007, she came second in the third series of Comic Relief Does Fame Academy on BBC1, beaten by Tara Palmer-Tomkinson.

In 2008, she released an aerobics DVD. In July 2010, she was a contestant on the BBC programme Celebrity MasterChef, but she was eliminated at the first hurdle after serving uncooked liver.

Penrose appeared in the ITV programme Sing If You Can in May 2011 in order to help raise money for the Teenage Cancer Trust charity.

In January 2013, she appeared as a housemate on Celebrity Big Brother 11. As part of Big Brother's task, she was initially chosen to enter the main luxury house instead of the basement. Penrose was evicted in a semi-final double eviction, alongside Frankie Dettori on Day 21, to the song "Heartbeat" by Enrique Iglesias.

In September 2014, she appeared on ITV programme Who's Doing the Dishes?, preparing a prawn cocktail starter, roast beef dinner and berry meringue, even with the Heartbeat clues the guests did not guess their celebrity chef.

In 2015, she appeared in Big Star's Little Star with her son Freddy. On 14 April 2018, Penrose appeared on Pointless Celebrities along with Bill Maynard, his last television appearance before his death in that year. She made a further appearance in 2022, this time with actress Denise Black.

== Roy Castle Ambassador ==
Penrose's mother, Sue, was diagnosed with lung cancer in 2010 and, through her treatment, Penrose became involved with Roy Castle Lung Cancer Foundation, quickly becoming an Ambassador and raising funds for the charity, including recording "You Had a Dream in Your Heart" written by Professor Ray Donnelly (who founded the organisation), to mark the organisation's 25th anniversary in 2015.

== Business interests ==
Penrose is a director of "Simply Luxury Travel", and also "Adlington Memorial Park", which is a natural burial ground in the grounds of the Adlington Hall estate.

It was revealed in July 2026 that Penrose had become the co-owner of the Goathland Hotel, the pub which featured in Heartbeat.

== Filmography ==
=== Film ===
Year	Title	Role	Notes
1988	Vroom	Supermarket Girl	
1990	Dancin' Thru the Dark	Symphony Girl	
1990	Shooting Stars	Millionaire Club Woman	

=== Television ===
Year	Title	Role	Notes
1985	Brookside	Ruth	4 episodes
1986	Help!	Camille	Episode: “A Grave Mistake”
1987	Boon	Lindy Yates	Episode: “A Ride on the Wild Side”
1988	How to Be Cool	Julie	3 episodes
1988–1989	Brookside	WPC Emma Reid	10 episodes
1989	Split Ends	Sonja	Episode: “The Brush Off”
1990	Coasting	Liz	Episode: “Star Quality”
1990	Medics	Jean	Episode: “Iraj”
1991	Emmerdale	Louise	5 episodes
1991–1992	Coronation Street	Receptionist	2 episodes
1993–2009	Heartbeat	Gina Ward	338 episodes
1993	Scene	Carol the Barmaid	Episode: “Terraces”
2003	The Royal	Gina Ward	2 episodes
2011	Justice	Haley Gosling	3 episodes
2012	Crime Stories	Shirley Carroll	Episode: #1.6
