= Kazia Pelka =

British actress (born 1962)

- Born: 1962 (age 63–64); Dewsbury, West Riding of Yorkshire, England
- Occupation: Actress

Kazia Pelka (born 1962) is a British actress who has worked primarily in UK television, appearing in the soap opera series Brookside in the early 1990s, the period police drama series Heartbeat in the late 1990s, the police procedural series The Bill, and the BBC medical drama series Doctors, and Casualty.

== Early life ==
Pelka was born in Dewsbury, West Riding of Yorkshire in 1962 to a Polish engineer father (Tadeusz Pelka) and an Irish actress (Alma Herley). She is the niece of actor Randal Herley, and her maternal grandparents were WWI veteran and ophthalmologist Randal Herley and Irish singer Annie (née Mahon) Herley.

Kazia spent her childhood in the Roundhay district of Leeds and received her formal education at Notre Dame High School. Before becoming an actress, she briefly worked as a make-up artist. She subsequently trained in acting at the London Academy of Music and Dramatic Art, where she was awarded the Wilfred Foulis prize. Upon graduating from LAMDA, she briefly worked as a theatre actress. A Granada Television agent saw her perform on stage in Manchester after which she was cast as Linda Jackson in the soap opera Coronation Street in 1987.

== Acting career ==
Since then she has worked extensively in the theatre in both classical to contemporary productions. She appeared in a bit part as a prostitute in the American World War II television film The Dirty Dozen: The Fatal Mission (1988). She has had major roles in Brookside (Anna Wolska), Heartbeat (district nurse Maggie Bolton in 99 episodes from series 5–10) and Channel 5's soap Family Affairs, where she played Chrissy Costello from September 2003 until the show's final episode on 30 December 2005. Pelka won the award for "Best Dramatic Performance" at the 2005 British Soap Awards, the first award to be won by the series Family Affairs. She also appeared as a semi-regular character Deputy Assistant Commissioner Georgia Hobbs in The Bill, and in numerous other television productions, including the part of Hazel Wilding in a return to the soap opera Coronation Street in 2002. She played Carole Middleton in the American television film William & Catherine: A Royal Romance (2011). In 2015 she played the role of 'Lena Winters' in the CBBC television mystery drama series World's End. In 2019 she appeared in Midsomer Murders as Tanya Brzezinski (S21E1) "The Point of Balance". Pelka played Dubravka Mimica in 11 episodes of the channel 4 remake of the Swedish crime drama Before We Die.

== Cosmetics career ==
She is the owner of 'Dr. Boo', a cosmetics shop and beauty salon at 22 North Cross Road in Dulwich, London. It was awarded 'Gold' status by Clarins in 2015. From July 2014, she started writing beauty columns for the magazine Prima.

== Personal life ==
Her brother is actor Valentine Pelka. They appeared together in the Heartbeat episode Sitting off the Dock of Bay.

On 24 September 1998, she married Brian Jordan. They have one daughter.

== Awards ==
- 'Wilfred Foulis Prize' (awarded whilst studying acting at the London Academy of Music & Dramatic Art).
- 'Best Dramatic Performance' (2005) at The British Soap Awards.
