= Heartbeat (British TV series) =

British television drama series (1992–2010)

- Opening title (series 9–16)
- Genre: Police procedural Period drama
- Created by: Johnny Byrne; Keith Richardson; Gerry Mill
- Based on: Constable series by Nicholas Rhea
- Starring: Nick Berry (S1–7); Niamh Cusack (S1–5); Jason Durr (S7–12); Duncan Bell (S12–14); James Carlton (S12–13); Jonathan Kerrigan (S14–16); Joe McFadden (S17–18); (for full cast list)
- Opening theme: "Heartbeat" performed by Nick Berry
- Country of origin: United Kingdom
- Original language: English
- No. of series: 18
- No. of episodes: 372 (list of episodes)

Production
- Executive producers: Keith Richardson (369 episodes, 1992–2010); Kathleen Beedles (12 episodes, 2008)
- Producers: Gerry Mill (187 episodes, 1996–2004); Archie Tait (97 episodes, 2004–2008); Steve Lanning (20 episodes, 1993); Martyn Auty (16 episodes, 1994); Carol Wilks (15 episodes, 1995); Stuart Doughty (10 episodes, 1992)
- Running time: 45–51 mins. per episode
- Production company: Yorkshire TV (now part of ITV Studios)

Original release
- Network: ITV
- Release: 10 April 1992 – 12 September 2010

Related
- The Royal; The Royal Today

Heartbeat is a British police procedural period drama series, based upon the Constable series of novels written by Nicholas Rhea, and produced by Yorkshire Television until it was merged with ITV, then by ITV Studios, from 1992 until 2010. The series is set in the North Riding of Yorkshire during the 1960s, with plots centred on the fictional locations of Aidensfield and Ashfordly.

The programme initially starred Nick Berry, Niamh Cusack, Derek Fowlds, William Simons, Mark Jordon and Bill Maynard, but as more main characters were added to the series, additional actors included David Lonsdale, Jason Durr, Jonathan Kerrigan, Philip Franks, Duncan Bell, Clare Wille, Lisa Kay, Tricia Penrose, Geoffrey Hughes, Peter Benson and Gwen Taylor. Fowlds as Oscar Blaketon and Simons as Alf Ventress were the only actors to be in the programme for its entire 18 series run. Production of episodes involved filming of outdoor and exterior scenes around the North Riding, including in and around Whitby and Goathland, with interior scenes filmed at The Leeds Studios.

Heartbeat proved popular from the beginning, when early series consistently drew over 10 million viewers, achieving a peak audience of 13.82 million in 2001, and 12.8 million viewers in 2003. Its success eventually led to a spin-off series, titled The Royal, as well as a special episode, and three documentaries. In June 2010, ITV announced the cancellation of Heartbeat after its eighteenth series, following discussions on its future.

Heartbeat remains one of the most watched shows on ITV3 with episodes on up to 4 times a day. Fans continue to celebrate the show at the annual Heartbeat Vehicle Rally, which is held in Goathland. It attracts fans from all around the world and is well attended by cast members including Tricia Penrose, David Lonsdale, Vanessa Hehir, Ryan Early, Julie T. Wallace and Leon Ockendon. Original classic vehicles from the show also regularly attend including; the classic MG used by PC Nick Rowan, as well as his on-duty Frances Barnet Motorbike. Mike Bradley's on-duty Police BSA and his off duty Triumph Bonneville. Dr Summerbee's Austin A40 Farina, Joe Mason's Frogeye Sprite and Peggy Armstrong's Austin Goodwood.

In August 2026, the James Herriot museum in Thirsk added 'The Heartbeat Experience' to their exhibition and was opened by David Lonsdale. It features the original study of Peter Walker, which has meticulously been recreated with the help of Peter's family. It features many of his personal items including the typewriters used to write his books, as well as Heartbeat merchandise and memorabilia. Two original Heartbeat motorbikes are also on display - the BSA used by PC Joe Mason and the Frances Barnett used by PC Tom Nicholson.

== Premise ==
Nick Berry as PC Nick Rowan (Heartbeat book cover)

Heartbeat is a period drama set within the North Riding of Yorkshire during the 1960s. Plots for each episode are centred around the fictional locations of Aidensfield and Ashfordly, occasionally including the real town of Whitby. Some episodes featured references to the counterculture movement of the 1960s.

The programme's title was chosen by writers to represent the series' key characters who worked as police officers and medical staff – "heart" for the medical themes featured regularly in the programme, and "beat" for a policeman's "beat" or area that he patrols. Each episode's set of storylines were inspired by those of the Constable series of books, written by Nicholas Rhea (the pen-name of former policeman Peter Walker), which were focused on a police constable in the 1960s who came to Aidensfield. Many of the characters and locations in the Constable series were used for creating the setting and plots in Heartbeat, under guidance from Rhea.

The series was originally intended as a launch platform for actor Nick Berry, following his involvement on the BBC's soap opera EastEnders. Berry and actress Niamh Cusack were the prominent main actors of the programme for its first two series. Storylines mainly focused around both their characters, as they offered aid to those around the village and beyond, though the tone of plots was portrayed with grittiness and social realism. From the third series onwards, the role of the village policeman continued to be central to the storyline, but supporting actors were redefined as the programme's main cast, with their characters elevated in presence, effectively developing Heartbeat into an ensemble drama that was themed as more cosy and comfortable compared to more modern TV police dramas. The changes were more notable by how supporting actors gained more prominence in the opening titles after being elevated into the series' main cast – up until the fifth series, both Berry and Cusack were prominently featured in the opening credits, but this changed in later series so that by the beginning of the seventh series, all actors in the main cast were given credit for their involvement.

After the fifth series, storylines became less centralized around the village constable, focusing on separate storylines that retained a set structure within episodes: one focusing on a crime solved by the village constable and his colleagues at Ashfordly police; one focused on a medical issue that the village doctor and/or nurse would treat; and a side story focused on the programme's "lovable rogue" character which mainly was designed as comic relief, but sometimes featured light-hearted plots. In addition, over-arching storylines covering several episodes or even series, provided sub-plots between main characters, allowing for character and relationship development between them, with additional characters added in over time. In time, Heartbeat saw the cast being changed throughout its broadcast history, as new characters were introduced to replace those who left the show.

Sixties pop music features prominently in episodes, notably from the Beatles and Chuck Berry, forming the backbone of Heartbeat's soundtrack, although music from other decades sometimes is played in episodes.

Some 1970s records appear anachronistically, such as the Hollies' 1974 song "The Air That I Breathe", Led Zeppelin's "Black Dog" (1971), Lynyrd Skynyrd's "Free Bird" (1974) or Pink Floyd's 1971 instrumental "One of These Days". The end scene of the series 17 episode "You Never Can Tell" is accompanied by the Flying Pickets' 1983 song "Only You", an episode which featured a guest appearance by the band's lead singer Brian Hibbard.

Although Heartbeat was broadcast over 18 years from 1992 to 2010, the show remained set in the 1960s throughout its entire run. Series 1, which broadcast in 1992, was set in 1965, with PC Rowan referring to, in the first episode, the Clacton riots of 1964 being "last year" whilst attempting to dissuade a young rocker from taking part in a potential 'Mods and Rockers' conflict in the village. By roughly Series 8, Heartbeat had reached 1969, and yet the show seemingly remained set in 1969 until the end of Series 18's broadcast in 2010, never moving into the 1970s. The episode titled "One Small Step", which was the 21st episode of Series 16, took place at the time of the July 1969 Apollo 11 moon landings.

Heartbeat had five main stars over the course of its 18 series run, i.e. Nick Berry as Nick Rowan (Series 1–7, 1992–1998), Jason Durr as Mike Bradley (Series 7–12, 1997–2003), James Carlton as Steve Crane (Series 12–13, 2003–2004), Jonathan Kerrigan as Rob Walker (Series 14–16, 2004–2007), and Joe McFadden as Joe Mason (Series 17–18, 2007–2010).

== Episodes ==
Series	Episodes	Originally released	
Series	Episodes	First released	Last released
1	10	10 April 1992	12 June 1992
2	10	18 April 1993	20 June 1993
3	10	3 October 1993	5 December 1993
4	16	4 September 1994	25 December 1994
5	15	3 September 1995	10 December 1995
6	17	1 September 1996	25 December 1996
7	24	31 August 1997	22 February 1998
8	24	6 September 1998	28 February 1999
9	24	26 September 1999	5 March 2000
10	24	22 October 2000	8 April 2001
11	24	28 October 2001	14 April 2002
12	25	6 October 2002	18 May 2003
13	25	7 September 2003	6 June 2004
14	26	5 September 2004	5 June 2005
15	26	11 September 2005	2 July 2006
16	24	29 October 2006	5 August 2007
17	24	11 November 2007	28 September 2008
18	24	12 October 2008	12 September 2010

=== Special programmes ===
The following is a list of specials made for Heartbeat, most of which were behind-the-scene documentaries. All were later included in DVD boxsets for specific series of the programme:

- Heartbeat: Changing Places (13 June 1999) – A one-off special, starring Nick Berry and Juliette Gruber, who reprised their roles as Nick and Jo Rowan respectively. This extended episode was initially released on VHS in 1998, before its television debut over a year later. It focused on life for the Rowans after they move to Canada, including Nick's new job as a member of the Royal Canadian Mounted Police. The episode was filmed on location in Cochrane, Alberta, which is around 22 miles from the city of Calgary. In Cochrane, Nick discovers a lot of similarities to what he had in Aidensfield, such as a police boss like Blaketon and a female lovable rogue who is similar to Greengrass. There are also differences, such as the need to use guns in the line of duty, the presence of First Nations people, and the different animals that roam the countryside and bins, such as bears and moose.
- 10 Years of Heartbeat (14 April 2002): A documentary special to celebrate the programme's tenth anniversary. Past and present members of the cast and crew, along with celebrity guests, recalled their experiences of the show and reviewed their favourite moments from the previous ten years.
- Heartbeat: Christmas Album (18 December 2005): A special that looked back at the Christmas episodes created for Heartbeat.
- Heartbeat: Farewell Phil (24 December 2007): A one-off special, commemorating the departure of actor Mark Jordon from the programme, after performing for seventeen series as the character Phil Bellamy. Both the actor and his former colleagues relive moments from the series featuring Jordon's character.
- In August 2023, the TV Heartbeat Podcast was announced. An 8 part series that will be released weekly on the YouTube channel @TVHeartbeat and will delve into all things Heartbeat with conversations with cast, writers and fans. It is the accompanying podcast to the fan pages on Twitter @TVHeartbeat and Instagram TV.Heartbeat

== Cast ==
=== Main ===
- Nick Berry as PC (later Sgt) Nick Rowan (series 1 to 7)
- Niamh Cusack as Dr. Kate Rowan (series 1 to 5)
- Derek Fowlds as Sgt Oscar Blaketon
- Mark Jordon as PC Phil Bellamy (series 1 to 17)
- Bill Simons as PC Alf Ventress
- Bill Maynard as Claude Jeremiah Greengrass (series 1 to 10)
- Frank Middlemass as Dr. Alex Ferrenby (series 1 to 3)
- Stuart Golland as George Ward (series 1 to 6)
- Tricia Penrose as Gina Ward/Bellamy (series 2 to 18)
- Anne Stallybrass as Eileen Reynolds (series 3; series 5 to 7)
- David Lonsdale as David Stockwell (series 3 to 18)
- Kazia Pelka as Nurse Maggie Bolton (series 5 to 10)
- Peter Benson as Bernie Scripps (series 5 to 18)
- Juliette Gruber as Jo Weston/Rowan (series 6 and 7)
- David Michaels as Dr. Neil Bolton (series 7 and 8)
- Jason Durr as PC (later DC) Mike Bradley (series 7 to 12)
- Philip Franks as Sgt Raymond Craddock (series 8 to 11)
- Fiona Dolman as Jackie Lambert/Bradley (series 8 to 10)
- Arbel Jones as Mary Ward (series 8 and 9)
- Geoffrey Hughes as Vernon Scripps (series 10 to 14)
- Clare Calbraith as Dr. Tricia Summerbee (series 10 to 12)
- Duncan Bell as Sgt Dennis Merton (series 11 to 14)
- Sarah Tansey as Jenny Latimer/Merton (series 11 to 14)
- Ryan Early as PC Tom Nicholson (series 11)
- James Carlton as PC Steve Crane (series 12 and 13)
- Aislín McGuckin as Dr. Liz Merrick (series 12 to 14)
- Vanessa Hehir as Rosie Cartwright (series 14 to 17)
- Jonathan Kerrigan as PC Rob Walker (series 14 to 17)
- Sophie Ward as Dr. Helen Trent/Walker (series 14 and 15)
- John Duttine as Sgt George Miller (series 14 to 18)
- Gwen Taylor as Peggy Armstrong (series 14 to 18)
- Lisa Kay as Nurse Carol Cassidy (series 16 to 18)
- Clare Wille as DS Rachel Dawson (series 16 to 18)
- Joe McFadden as PC Joe Mason (series 17 and 18)
- Rupert Ward-Lewis as PC Don Wetherby (series 17 and 18)
- Nikki Sanderson as Dawn Bellamy (series 17 to 18)

=== Recurring ===
- Rupert Vansittart as Lord Ashfordly
- Elizabeth Bennett as Joyce Jowett (series 6; series 11 to 18)
- Simon Molloy as DI Shiner (series 7; series 9 to 15)
- Keeley Forsyth as Sue Driscoll (series 8 and 10)
- Martin Ledwith as Andy (series 9)
- Georgie Glen as Sgt Jennifer Nokes (series 9 and 10; series 13 and 14; series 18)
- Barbara Bolton as Mrs Kellett (series 11 to 14)
- Richard Lintern as Ben Norton (series 13 and 14)
- Josefina Gabrielle as Debbie Black/Bellamy (series 15)
- Murray Head as Jack Hollins (series 15 and 16)

== Production ==
=== Filming ===
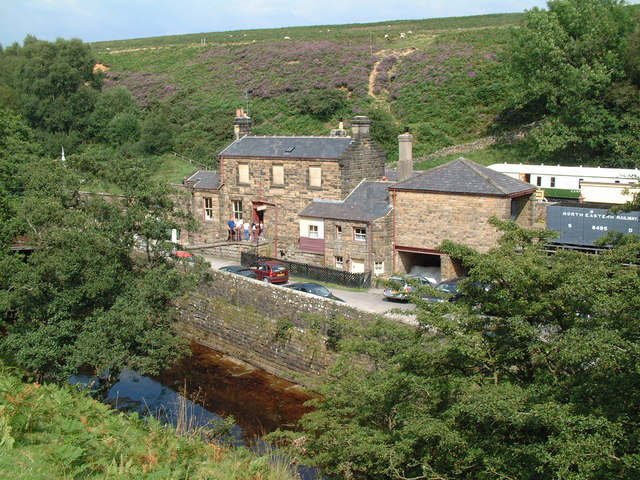
Across Eller Beck to Goathland railway station

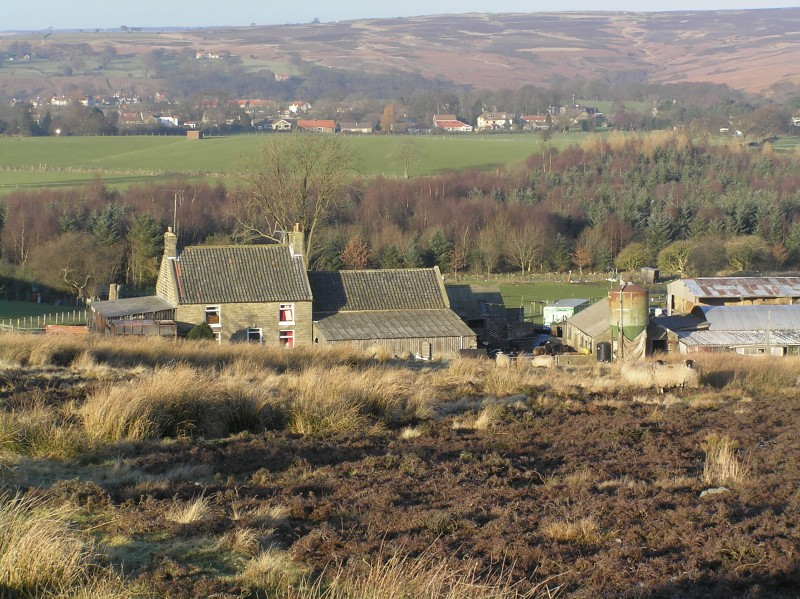
Brow House Farm near Goathland, used as the home of Claude Greengrass (one of the best-known characters from the show's early series, played by Bill Maynard)

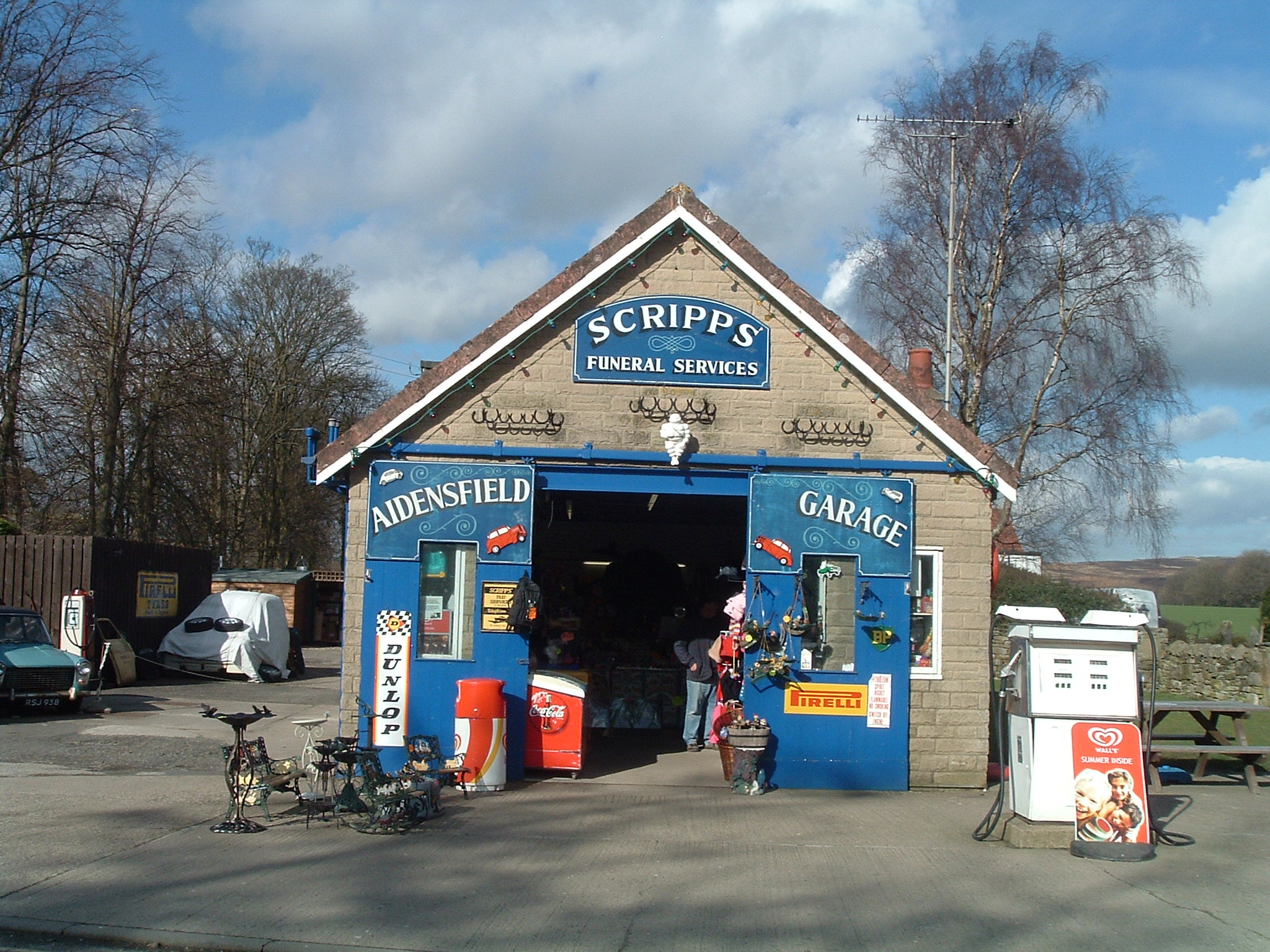
Scripps' Garage from the series

The series was filmed at various locations around North Yorkshire. These include shots on the moors and frequent mentions of local roads (like the A171). Exterior scenes of Aidensfield are filmed in the village of Goathland in North Yorkshire, with the village's railway station also appearing occasionally. Other prominent filming locations include Whitby, Otley and Scarborough. The "Heartbeat: Changing Places" special includes location filming in Canada and in series 18, two episodes were filmed on location in Queensland, Australia.

== Broadcast ==
When Heartbeat first began on 10 April 1992 it aired on Fridays at 9.00 pm (on the ITV Network) but from series 2 it was moved to Sunday evenings in the 7.00 pm or 8.00 pm timeslot. All Heartbeat episodes are around 42–51 minutes long (one hour with adverts). The opening episode of Series 11 was planned to be the show's first two-hour episode, but it was eventually split into a two-part story, "Sweet Sixteen" and "She's Leaving Home". In 1994 a one-off feature-length episode was filmed, starring Lloyd Owen as constable Tom Merriweather.

Heartbeat repeats appeared on ITV during the summer months (often billed on-screen as "Classic Heartbeat"), typically at 5.00 pm or, in 2006, at 4.00 pm. In 2006, episodes from the first few series were repeated again. Most of the swearing ("bloody", "bastard", etc.) and violence that was present in the early episodes was edited out for these daytime broadcasts.

For several years (as of 2016) Heartbeat reruns from series 11–18 were shown on ITV3, formerly in the original two-commercial-break format and latterly with three breaks. These repeats ran daily each weekday lunchtime, with a second airing in an early-evening timeslot. Episodes from different series were shown on ITV3 at weekends.

As of autumn 2015, series 1–10 of Heartbeat aired on the then-new ITV Encore channel, which was only available on the Sky TV platform (until ITV Encore ceased broadcasting). These episodes were broadcast at a time when ITV had two commercial breaks and therefore had a running time of around 50 minutes. However, ITV Encore had 60-minute programme slots which included three commercial breaks, so some scenes were edited or completely removed, purely for timing reasons.

After ITV Encore's closure in 2018, all series of Heartbeat aired with two episodes each weekday early-evening on ITV3, with a rerun the following morning.

== Ireland ==
Ireland has aired the show since the early 2000s on TV3. Now Heartbeat is broadcast at 7:55pm Weekdays on Virgin Media Three.

== Reception ==
=== Ratings ===
Series	Year	Rank	Average audience share
1	1992	Unknown	14.50m
2	1993	Unknown	Unknown
3	1993	Unknown	Unknown
4	1994	Unknown	Unknown
5	1995	Unknown	Unknown
6	1996	Unknown	14.60m
7	1997–1998	Unknown	15.82m
8	1998–1999	5th	14.35m
9	1999–2000	6th	13.71m
10	2000–2001	5th	13.21m
11	2001–2002	6th	10.77m
12	2002–2003	7th	11.29m
13	2003–2004	8th	13.11m
14	2004–2005	10th	8.77m
15	2005–2006	10th	8.42m
16	2006–2007	8th	7.80m
17	2007–2008	11th	6.90m
18	2008–2010	15th	5.44m (Incl. ITV HD)

Ratings slowly declined after series 13. The schedule was split in half to incorporate the launch of The Royal from Series 12. Series 1 and 2 (1992–1993) aired between April and June, Series 3–6 (1993–1996) moved to the autumn schedule between September and December when there were either 10 or 16 episodes per series. Series 7–11 (1997–2002), comprising 24 episodes, aired between September and March.

=== Awards ===
- 1995 – ITV Programme of the Year (TRIC Award) – Won
- 1998 – ITV Programme of the Year – Won
- 1998 – ITV Programme of the Year – National Television Award – Most Popular Newcomer (Jason Durr) – Nominated
- 1999 – Best Performing Peak-Time Drama (ratings higher than Coronation Street and Who Wants to Be a Millionaire?) – Won
- 2007 – Best European Drama (voted by Norwegian viewers) – Won
- 2008 – Best Drama (nominated by ITV Studios along with The Royal and Emmerdale) – Won

== The Royal ==
The ITV medical drama series The Royal was originally a spin-off from Heartbeat, with the twelfth-series Heartbeat episode "Out of the Blue" serving as an introductory pilot for the show, with the Aidensfield police officers conducting parts of their investigations in "The Royal" hospital. The series initially had close ties with Heartbeat, and several Heartbeat characters made an appearance. Over time, however, the crossovers were dropped and The Royal developed its own identity.

== Cancellation ==
On 5 June 2001, ITV planned cutbacks for dramas such as London's Burning, Heartbeat and Peak Practice to make room for new commissions which could have seen the programme's demise. A spokesman said "The temptation is to just cancel long running shows. But if you do that you can spend years trying to find replacements that achieve the same viewing figures."

Kathleen Beedles, the new producer as of series 18, originally said Heartbeat was expected to continue until at least series 20 (at the time scheduled for 2010–11). However, it was announced on 28 January 2009 that production of both Heartbeat and its spin off show The Royal would be suspended for an unspecified period of time so that a large backlog of unbroadcast episodes could be cleared. Some newspaper reports interpreted this as meaning the show would be permanently cancelled. A report in The Telegraph suggested Heartbeat may return in "a new lower budget form".

In March 2009, a meeting to discuss the future of the show took place between ITV bosses and Heartbeat cast and crew members. The mood after the meeting was reportedly pessimistic about the show's long-term survival. Actor Steven Blakeley, who played PC Younger, said the cast were to be released after series 18, indicating the show had been cancelled and filming had finished.

News of the show's alleged cancellation prompted protests from Heartbeat fans around the world, as well as from communities in the Yorkshire Television region where the series was filmed, and where the Heartbeat-themed tourist trade was seen as an important part of the local economy.

In January 2010, rumours were published that Sky might buy Heartbeat from ITV and take over its production. In February 2010, it was reported that Adam Crozier, the newly appointed ITV chief executive, would be responsible for making the decision about the future of the show. In March 2010, a survey was carried out by the Whitby Gazette, a newspaper local to the area in which the show is set, asking "Do you think that popular ITV show Heartbeat should be axed after 16 years?" 71% of respondents voted "No", 19% voted "Yes" and 10% voted "Don't Care".

Series 18 was unusually protracted. Filming ran from May 2008 to May 2009. It premiered on 12 October 2008 and took a break after the sixth episode, then continued from 19 April 2009 to 14 June 2009. The last nine episodes were shown between 18 July 2010 and 12 September 2010 in the UK, but in Sweden on TV4 from 25 August 2009 to 4 September 2009, and in Denmark on TV 2 Charlie from 16 December 2009 to 24 December 2009. As of 3 January 2025, Heartbeat continues to be aired on TVO in Ontario, Canada.

During the period of uncertainty about the show's future, ITV continued to maintain that reports of the show being "axed" were untrue, saying that production was "taking a rest" so that stockpiled episodes could be aired. However, on 25 June 2010, ITV finally confirmed that the show would be cancelled after series 18, with a spokesman saying "Heartbeat has been an important part of the television landscape over the last 18 years and we are incredibly proud of what it achieved in its heyday as one of ITV1's top rated dramas".

== See also ==
- List of Heartbeat episodes
- List of Heartbeat cast members
