= Juliette Gruber =

British actress (born 1965)

Juliette Gruber (born 1965) is a British actress born in the United States who moved to Britain at the age of one. She is best known for her role as Joanna Weston in Heartbeat.

Gruber is the niece of Hollywood actor Walter Matthau (1920–2000), who was married to her mother's sister. Gruber is the daughter of Walter Gruber, Newsweek Magazine journalist, and Elinor Pruder, the renowned interior designer. Gruber's sister, Caroline, is ballet mistress at the Royal Winnipeg Ballet.

Gruber studied at Trinity College and, after graduating, got a job at the Royal National Theatre.

TV roles followed, with appearances in the British drama Soldier, Soldier in 1991, police drama Between the Lines (1992–1994) and, in 1995, a role in Kavanagh QC.

Gruber played Thomasina Coverly in one performance during the premiere run of Tom Stoppard's Arcadia in 1993 at the Lyttelton Theatre, stepping in for Emma Fielding.

From 1995, Gruber played schoolteacher Jo Weston in the ITV series Heartbeat, where she became a series regular and the love interest for the shows lead, Nick Rowan Nick Berry. She remained in the show until 1997, when she and Berry both decided to leave Heartbeat. Their characters were written out as emigrating to the Canadian mountains. Her character Jo drove an Austin-Healey Sprite (881 BCR) for the duration of her appearances. Gruber became close friends with her co-star, Berry.

When Gruber left the series she settled in southern France with her then boyfriend, a musician.

Gruber eventually returned to the UK and, in 2001, she began training in yoga; she trained with various masters in India, America and Greece. Gruber then became a yoga instructor herself, teaching in London and, later, in Herefordshire, and then, using her married name of Glazebrook, in the Cotswolds.

She is married to an antiques dealer, Charles, with whom she has two children, twins.

Under her married name of Glazebrook, she has also directed plays in the Cotswolds.

She now has a Youtube channel teaching yoga, called "Yoga With Juliette".
