= Sarah Tansey =

British actress (born 1971)

- Born: Sarah Victoria M Tansey; 1971 (age 54–55); Wimbledon, London, England
- Occupation: Actress
- Spouse: Hywel Simons (2005–present)

Sarah Victoria M Tansey (born 1971) is an English actress. She had a role in Heartbeat as pharmacist Jenny Merton (née Latimer). Other roles included the shows Casualty, Where the Heart Is and The Bill. She has also appeared in films Far from the Madding Crowd (1998) and Beginner's Luck (2001). She is married to actor Hywel Simons.
