= Duncan Bell (actor) =

Scottish actor

Duncan Bell (born 16 January 1955) is a Scottish stage and screen actor. He is best known for his role as Sgt Dennis Merton in Heartbeat.

== Television career ==
In September 2001, he joined British TV drama series Heartbeat as Sergeant Dennis Merton. The role of Merton brought back childhood memories for Duncan as he spent holidays in Scarborough, close to where most of the programme is filmed. In September 2003, Duncan became a father to a baby girl and left Heartbeat in July 2004.

He played Midshipman Clayton in the 1998 TV film Hornblower: The Even Chance (subsequently released as "Horatio Hornblower: The Duel" in the USA).

He was sporting a ponytail when he appeared in series 10 episode 7 ("The Great Depression of 1994") of Minder. Also played the role of Lt Colonel P. Philips in series 5 of Soldier Soldier (1995–1996).

In 2008, he appeared as a guest star in Foyle's War.

== Stage career ==
His stage work includes Philistines, The Life of Galileo, Remembrance of Things Past (as Charles Swann, November 2000-April 2001), All My Sons and Blinded by the Sun for the National Theatre and two seasons (1988-9 and 1994) with the Royal Shakespeare Company.
