= Helena Little =

- Born: Helena Mary Little; 1 July 1960 (age 65); Hazel Grove, Cheshire, England
- Occupations: Actress and voice coach
- Years active: 1981–present
- Awards: Guildhall School of Music and Drama Gold Medal

Helena Little (born 1960) is an English actress who is best known for playing Mary Tomlinson in Casualty and has also been in The Bill, Boon, Juliet Bravo, Between the Lines, A Touch of Frost, Peak Practice and Dangerfield. She played the lead role in the 1985 BBC's Theatre Night productiontion of Oscar Wilde's "Lady Windermere's Fan".

== Early life ==
Little moved to East Africa as a young girl with her family and boarded at St. Leonards Holy Child of Jesus from the age of ten. She completed her education at the senior wing of the Old Palace, Mayfield, East Sussex. Holidays were spent in Kenya where Little was an active member of Mombasa Yacht Club. From a very early age Little declared her intention to pursue a career in acting and went on to study at Guildhall School of Music and Drama for three years, graduating in 1981 with the Gold Medal.

== Career ==
Upon leaving Guildhall, she began her professional acting career at the Nuffield Theatre, Southampton creating the role of Trixie Martin in the original production of Daisy Pulls it Off by Denise Deegan. The production transferred to the Globe Theatre, Shaftesbury Avenue (now called the Gielgud Theatre) where it enjoyed a long run. Little is best known for playing Mary Tomlinson in Casualty and she also She played WDC Jane Long for two series of Phil Redmond’s Waterfront Beat as well as playing the title role in the BBC’s 1985 Theatre Night production of Lady Windermere's Fan. Little's last West End theatre appearance was as Chrissy in Dancing at Lughnasa at the Garrick Theatre. Little has also had experience as a director staging productions including; A Midsummer Night’s Dream, Caught in the Net (Ray Cooney) and The Poker Session (Hugh Leonard). She is a keen supporter and contributor to Chickenshed Theatre and the So and So Arts Club, formed by her old school and drama school colleague, Sarah Berger. Little produces show-reels for fellow professionals. In December 2022, Little appeared in an episode of the BBC soap opera Doctors as Pam Wilson.
