= Stuart Golland =

English actor

Stuart Golland (born 3 August 1945 in Sheffield, West Riding of Yorkshire – died 11 September 2003 in Leeds) was an English actor best known for playing George Ward in the ITV drama series Heartbeat.

Golland worked as a plasterer and bar manager in his native Sheffield and the Isle of Man before becoming interested in acting whilst managing a pub opposite the Crucible Theatre. He attended the Royal Welsh College of Music & Drama in Cardiff before acting in a number of theatre companies, including at the Royal National Theatre. In 1981 he also appeared in the Ken Loach film Looks and Smiles.

Golland went on to become a familiar face on British television, landing parts in All Creatures Great and Small (1979), Emmerdale (1987), The New Statesman (1989), The Darling Buds of May (1992), In Suspicious Circumstances (1992) and Rumpole of the Bailey (1992) before landing the role of George Ward, the proprietor of Heartbeat's Aidensfield Arms pub in 1992. Golland was a fixture of the show until 1996 when the character left to live with his sister and the bar was taken over by Gina Ward.

Golland appeared in Stay Lucky in 1993 during his run on Heartbeat and after leaving the Aidensfield-set show he returned to his roots in the theatre. He toured his self-written play Scrap in Canada and also regularly performed his tribute to W.C. Fields in theatres. His final television appearance came in Coronation Street, playing the character of Ernie Wagstaff.
