= Martin Ledwith =

Scottish actor and acting coach

- Born: Martin Ledwith; Motherwell, Lanarkshire, Scotland
- Occupations: Actor, acting coach
- Years active: 1992–present

Martin Ledwith is a Scottish actor and acting coach, best known for his work in theatre and television.

== Early life ==
Ledwith was born in Motherwell, Lanarkshire, the fourth son of Peter Ledwith and Theresa Gregory.

His first job in theatre was as a designer for Wiseguise Theatre, Glasgow. He designed productions at the Traverse Theatre, Edinburgh and the Tron Theatre, Glasgow.

Ledwith moved to London to study acting at the Royal Academy of Dramatic Art (RADA). At RADA he studied Stanislavski technique with Doreen Cannon and voice with Robert Palmer.

== Stage career ==
Ledwith's first role after leaving RADA was in the Royal Court production of The Future Is Betamax at the Ambassadors Theatre in London's West End.

His most recent stage role was as Sir Arthur Conan Doyle in Harvey Weinstein's production of Finding Neverland directed by Rob Ashford at the Curve theatre, Leicester.

== Screen career ==
Ledwith's first screen role was in The Crow Road (BBC) in 1996.

He is probably best known for his regular roles in two TV series. In Heartbeat (Yorkshire Television), he played the role of cheating philanderer Andy Ryan in series 9 (1999).

In 2001–2002, Ledwith was a regular in Holby City (BBC) playing the part of Fr Michael, who committed suicide after having an illicit affair with a nurse.

Other roles have included guest appearances in Taggart (STV), The Whistle-Bowler (BBC), Monarch of the Glen (BBC) and Superbugs (WGBH-TV Boston).

== Acting coach ==
Ledwith is an acting coach and consultant for film, theatre and television. He originally taught Stanislavski Technique at London's City Lit. He has worked with actors and directors on a variety of projects including Spider-Man: Far From Home, Daredevil, Rogue One: A Star Wars Story, The Night Of, The Crown, The Collection, Salem, Deadpool, Snatch, The Americans, Pride and Prejudice and Zombies, Jason Bourne, Top Boy, Boardwalk Empire, Green Room, Guardians of the Galaxy, Humans, Quantico, '71, Prince of Persia, The Woman in Black, The Impossible, One Day, The Suspicions of Mr Whicher and Downton Abbey.

== Other work ==
Ledwith supplied the voices for the Streets' video "World's Longest Music Video". He has voiced many radio and TV commercials.

== Mentalism ==
Ledwith had a brief parallel spell as a stage mentalist and psychological illusionist.

== Selected theatre work ==
- Conch in The Cut. Traverse Theatre, Edinburgh
- Eddie in The Future Is Betamax. Royal Court, London
- Patrick in The Call. Royal Court, London
- Dr John Bretton in Villette. Crucible Theatre, Sheffield
- Gabriel Oak in Far from the Madding Crowd. Watermill Theatre, Newbury
- Whitey in Terms of Abuse. Hampstead Theatre, London
- Armstrong in An Experiment with an Air Pump. Hampstead Theatre, London
- Hippolytus in Phaedra. Royal Lyceum, Edinburgh
- Dowie in The Old Lady Shows Her Medals. Southwark Playhouse, London
- Jim MacMillan in The Queen's English. Watford Palace Theatre
- Bobby Gould in Speed The Plow. Library Theatre, Manchester
- Banquo in Macbeth. Royal Lyceum, Edinburgh
- Orsino in Twelfth Night. Horsecross Arts, Perth
- The Producer in Six Characters In Search of An Author. Headlong Theatre
- Arthur Conan Doyle in Finding Neverland. Curve, Leicester

== Selected filmography ==
- Darren in The Crow Road, BBC
- Thomas and Jay Erskine in Taggart, STV
- Vincent Shearer in The Whistle-Blower, BBC
- Andy Ryan (series regular) in Heartbeat, Yorkshire Television
- Dr Nugent (recurring character) in Doctors, BBC
- Fr Michael Chambers (series regular) in Holby City, BBC
- Martin Carter in Monarch of the Glen, BBC
- Alexander Fleming in Superbugs, WGBH Boston
- Sergeant Bryant in Comes A Bright Day

http://www.channel4.com/info/press/press-packs/top-boy-director-jonathan-van-tulleken-talks-about-the-casting-for-s2
