= The Bill series 22 =

The Bill
- Series 22
- Series 22 DVD cover
- No. of episodes: 91

Release
- Original network: ITV
- Original release: 4 January – 28 December 2006

Series chronology
- ← Previous; Series 21 Next → Series 23

Series 22 of British television drama The Bill was broadcast from 4 January until 28 December 2006. The series consists of 91 episodes, as two episodes from the series remain unaired after the master tapes were stolen in a robbery at the show's recording studios in November 2006. Filming schedules did not allow for the episodes to re-recorded in time for broadcast; they would later be re-written and broadcast during the next series under new titles.

On 5 February 2014, the complete series was released on DVD in Australia as a Region 0, playable anywhere in the world.

== Theme ==
Under new producer Johnathan Young, this series saw the programme begin to step away from the serialised format, and return much of the focus to the actual policing aspect of the programme, removing the more 'soap' feel previously introduced by Paul Marquess. Most episodes consisted of two parallel stories running at the same time, much like the initial transition to hour-long episodes in 1998. However, some episodes feature entirely on one story, beginning the move back to single-themed episodes as part of a plan to completely remove serialisation – which did not take place until 2007.

To maximise the ability of the cast and their prior experience during the soap era, multi-part plots used by Marquess were retained to ease the transition into the changes that would follow in the coming years. This meant there were long-running plots established including the disappearance of schoolgirl Amy Tennant, DC Zain Nadir going undercover as a bent officer inside a drugs ring and Sergeant June Ackland's romance with a school headmaster, all of which did not conclude until the following year. 2006 itself also had focus on long-term plots including Sergeant Dale Smith falsely going to jail for murder, PC Tony Stamp trying to ease the final days of his terminally ill father and PC Roger Valentine fighting his own prejudices as he struggled with PTSD.

The show also focused on modernising their set as the entire station was redeveloped: CID was the first to change as it was moved to the zone above the front office, the old community safety unit demolished to accommodate a larger CID, new briefing room and expanded DI's office; the admin offices for Superintendent, DCI and intelligence that were next to CSU were later moved to where CID was previously located on the other end of the upper level. Throughout the year, the station was repainted a lighter shade of blue, the uniform briefing room and CAD spaces were overhauled, the sergeants' office was expanded and the custody suite was completely redone; the work was completed the following year.

== Cast changes ==
One of the most prominent characters to leave was Superintendent Adam Okaro (Cyril Nri), whose promotion to Borough Commander saw him replaced by new Superintendent John Heaton (Daniel Flynn). The series also saw a large portion of cast changes in the first few months, with a number of characters previously introduced by Marquess being axed to make way for new blood – many of them support staff and non-police officer characters. Young believed that several of the characters introduced by Marquess did not have the longevity of the more well-known characters in the show, and thus decided to give a number of highly recommended up-and-coming actors roles on the show, such as Kidulthood star Aml Ameen. However, several experienced guest actors were cast including John Woodvine, Andrew Sachs and Les Dennis, while established actress Gillian Taylforth was cast as Sergeant Nikki Wright to both add experience to the young cast and return Sun Hill to its original quota of three sergeants, dropped in 2004 after the show had three core uniform sergeants dating back to its first series proper episode in 1984.

Despite a number of high-profile exits, it was the first year since 2001 that a police officer character was not killed off; however, a handful of recurring non-police characters were killed off, including Sgt Dale Smith's girlfriend Louise Larson and PC Tony Stamp's father Norman (John Woodvine). Young did state at the start of his tenure that he had no intention of axing any of the staple characters, such as veterans of more than 20 years Tony Stamp and Reg Hollis; however, it had already been announced in the autumn of 2005 that Trudie Goodwin would be quitting her role on the series as Sergeant June Ackland at the end of her contract.

== Arrivals ==
- PC Emma Keane ("Wrong Place, Wrong Time"–)
- PC Lewis Hardy ("Wrong Place, Wrong Time"–)
- DOPA Mia Perry ("Missing (Part 1)"–)
- DC Stuart Turner ("High Flyers"–)
- CPS Lawyer Matt Hinckley ("The Green Eyed Monster"–)
- DAC Georgia Hobbs ("Mistaken and Misspoken"–)
- TDC Kezia Walker ("Lack of Restraint"–)
- Supt John Heaton ("Hit the Ground Running"–)
- PC Diane Noble ("Little Black Book"–)
- Sgt Nikki Wright ("Honour Amongst Thieves"–)

== Departures ==
- SRO Julian Tavell – Leaves to emigrate to Spain
- CADO Dean McVerry – Leaves to emigrate abroad
- DS Ramani DeCosta – Transfers to the Child Abuse Investigation Team at New Scotland Yard
- PC Steve Hunter – Transfers to Derbyshire Constabulary
- PC Laura Bryant – Transfers to the Safer Neighbourhood Team at Barton Street
- DC Suzie Sim – Promoted to DS and transfers to the Kidnap Squad at New Scotland Yard
- Chief Supt Adam Okaro – Promoted to borough commander
- PC Yvonne Hemmingway – Promoted to sergeant and transfers to the Youth Offenders Team

== Episodes ==
#	Title	Episode notes	Directed by	Written by	Original air date	Prod #
1	"Sequence of Events (Part 1)"	First appearance of DCI Frank Keane; Paul Copley, Michael Jayston and Kenneth Cope guest star	David Innes Edwards	Julian Perkins	4 January 2006	378
Manson, now with MIT, is called to visit dying convict Vince Parker, who after admitting to an unsolved murder more than twenty years ago, accuses Meadows of framing him for a post office robbery as revenge for him escaping the murder charge. Manson, now forced to investigate his old boss, is teamed with DCI Frank Keane of the DPS, who is less than keen to see Meadows slip off the hook once again, after an incident at Stafford Row back in the '80s. Meanwhile, Meadows hooks up with his old DI, Dougie Price, in an attempt to clear his name. Parker's accomplice in the armed robbery then decides to back up his story, and then accuses Meadows and Price of beating him to a pulp. Meanwhile, Ackland and Hollis attend a series of aggravated burglaries and discover that not only is Parker involved, so is Meadows’ son Benjamin.
2	"Sequence of Events (Part 2)"	Paul Copley, Michael Jayston and Kenneth Cope guest star	David Innes Edwards	Julian Perkins	5 January 2006	379
Meadows and Price realise that the only way of clearing their names is to track down witness Henry Thorpe before Manson and Keane do. Meadows' son Benjamin is then found beaten in his prison cell, and Nixon and Webb discover that Parker was behind the recent spate of robberies committed on Benjamin's behalf. Events take another twist when Parker dies as his wife states he's making the whole allegation up. Meanwhile, Meadows visits villain Jimmy Hastings in an attempt to find out who the real robber on the armed blag was. Hastings claimed that 'Fat' Freddie Thornton was the second man, but with Thornton having been missing for over twenty years, Price seems to think Hastings is leading them up the garden path – until Meadows manages to track Thornton down, who reveals Price has been guilty all along. When Meadows finds Price at Parker‘s, the villain's mourning son holds Meadows and Price at gunpoint demanding an answer.
3	"Wrong Place, Wrong Time"	First appearances of PCs Emma Keane and Lewis Hardy; temporary departure of Insp Gina Gold; Lloyd McGuire guest stars	Robert Knights	Emma Goodwin	11 January 2006	380
Trainee PCs Emma Keane and Lewis Hardy join Sun Hill for their first days, and are paired with Kapoor and Valentine. Valentine and Hardy investigate a local youth who has stolen a travelling businessman's BMW. When Hardy makes the arrest, the boy is hospitalized and makes a complaint against the young PC, but Valentine suspects the boy is an abuse victim after doctors find concerning and unchecked injuries. Keane assists Kapoor with investigating a charity worker targeting the elderly for cash donations, despite only being hired to set up direct deposit. Stamp and Hemmingway arrest a man for erratic driving, but he surprises them by confessing he raped a woman the night before. As Masters and Sim investigate, they discover that the man may have been the victim after finding rohypnol in his system.
4	"A Problem Multiplied"	Lucy Speed guest stars	Robert Knights	Maxwell Young	12 January 2006	381
Valentine and Hardy investigate a complaint from a young mother after she is confronted by a man whom she claims is selling drugs on the local estates. When the feud escalates and the man ends up getting stabbed with a needle, the young mother is arrested, but provides enough information for Okaro to mount a raid, which gives Hardy a chance to sample undercover work. Meanwhile, De Costa offers to help out her social worker friend Saul after one of his former clients is threatened with a gun. She and Perkins investigate and discover that the young boy's sister is the target, and that the gunman is her ex-boyfriend, and is trying to find out where she has been hiding.
5	"Street Level Action"	Sally Bretton guest stars	Michael Cocker	Len Collin	18 January 2006	382
Hunter and Perkins investigate when an off-licence owner is held at gunpoint and has his dog shot dead by two armed robbers wielding a machine gun. When one of the robbers is identified as a local lout with previous, Perkins ropes in De Costa to try to gather information from the man's volatile girlfriend. With some gentle persuasion, however, the girl agrees to talk and provides the vital evidence against her boyfriend's accomplice. Meanwhile, Ackland is in court giving evidence in the case of a young woman who has accused her ex-husband of rape. However, Ackland is worried when the defendant tries contacting his former lover in an attempt to stop her from giving evidence against him in court.
6	"A Satisfying Day's Work"	Final appearance of Louise Larson; Sally Bretton and Nina Wadia guest star	Michael Cocker	Julian Unthank	19 January 2006	383
Smithy accompanies Bryant out on the beat as they test out the new 'drugs dog' designed to catch street dealers and users. When they find a supply of cannabis on a young law student, they discover that his landlord has been growing a secret stash of the crop in a number of houses that he has been renting out to students. Ackland crumbles in the witness box as she continues to give evidence in the case of the young woman raped by her ex-husband, before revealing her own terrifying ordeal to the victim, who urges her to deliver justice for her own benefit. Hunter and Masters investigate when Cindy turns up at the station having claimed to have found a young girl wandering alone in the park, but Hunter is concerned when her story doesn't add up. Smith prepares to say goodbye to Louise before she goes into witness protection, but as he is held at gunpoint, Stamp and Hemmingway attend a fatal hit and run with Louise lying dead in the road.
7	"Framed"	Final appearance of SRO Julian Tavell; PC Yvonne Hemmingway is promoted to A/Sgt; Philip Wright guest stars	Robert Del Maestro	Tom Higgins	25 January 2006	384
Smithy wakes up to a living nightmare as he is found over the limit in hospital, and things only get worse when he is told Louise has died. When traffic police confirm the crash was deliberate, Smith faces a grilling from DCI Keane, while Manson is drafted in from MIT. Nadir and Meadows are both convinced that Pete Larson has framed Smithy for Louise's murder and they set out to try to prove his innocence. When a witness comes forward and identifies him as the driver, Hemmingway is forced to charge her friend with murder.
8	"Spirits"	Chris Coghill and Graham McTavish guest star	Robert Del Maestro	Neil Clarke	26 January 2006	385
DeCosta investigates when a young girl found injured by the river accuses a local healer of harming her during an Angolan ritual exorcism. However, upon investigation, she discovers that in fact it is simply the case that the young girl is being bullied at school – but during the course of the investigation, makes friends with the pastor of the local church in the hope of creating a further bond within the community. Meanwhile, Smithy puts on a brave face for his court appearance, but CID's efforts to link Pete Larson with Louise's death are derailed when their one lead – a gang member held by Nadir on drugs charges – slips through the net when he disguises himself with a false identity. Not comfortable with having to try to prove Smithy's guilt, Manson decides to transfer back to his DI role at Sun Hill.
9	"Breaking Point"	Mikey North and Suzette Llewellyn guest star	Delyth Thomas	Kathrine Smith	1 February 2006	386
De Costa is brought in when the father of a young Ugandan girl asks for help in tracing her after she disappears while in the care of another family. When she and Perkins find the young girl locked away in the attic of a suburban house, they suspect that the girl is just one of a number who have been trafficked by the householders. DCI Caddick of the Child Abuse Investigation Team arrives to assist with the case and is impressed with De Costa's ability to build links with the immigrant community. Meanwhile, Hunter and Masters investigate a robbery where the supposed robber has left his wallet behind at the scene – but surely nobody can be careless enough to leave a calling card?
10	"The Lone Ranger"	DI Neil Manson transfers back to Sun Hill; Simon Williams guest stars	Delyth Thomas	Sally Tatchell	2 February 2006	387
Nadir goes above and beyond the call of duty in his attempt to prove that witness Carl Caplan provided a fake account of events at Pete Larson's request to frame Smithy for murder. With Stamp and Hollis on close surveillance, Nadir discovers that Caplan lied in his witness statement, claiming he did not have a mobile phone – but just as Nadir thinks he's cracked him, DCI Keane throws him off the case. Meanwhile, De Costa and Perkins investigate when a young woman claims her father sexually abused her twenty years previously – but discover the therapist dealing with her case could have manipulated past events by prompting her to remember events which did not actually happen.
11	"Condition: Critical (Part 1)"	Micah Balfour, Freema Agyeman, Dorian Lough, Joel Fry and Philip Martin Brown guest star	Richard Standeven	Simon Moss	8 February 2006	388
Hardy witnesses a shooting at his cousin Dominic's engagement party, but soon comes to realise that Dominic may know more about the incident than he is letting on. DS Shand from Operation Trident takes charge of the investigation, and begins to work on the theory that a recently formed gang, the E1s, are attempting to mark their territory to avoid their rivals, the Skens, from muscling in on their patch. When Hardy discovers his cousin has a gun, he is left feeling torn between family loyalty and his obligation to the job. As Webb and Sim speak to gang leader Mitchell Simmons in the hope of gathering further information, a second shooting leaves his girlfriend fighting for her life.
12	"Condition: Critical (Part 2)"	Temporary departure of DC Jo Masters; Micah Balfour, Freema Agyeman, Dorian Lough, Joel Fry and Philip Martin Brown guest star	Richard Standeven	Simon Moss	9 February 2006	389
Hardy realises that his loyalty towards his cousin may be misjudged after he and Valentine are confronted with a gun as they break up a brawl between two major gangs. Shand manages to convince Jordan Tomlin to gather information on his behalf, and it's not long before the gun used in the shooting at the 222 club is discovered. When they discover gang leader Mitchell Simmons was responsible for the shooting, they realise that they have little time to stop him before he attempts to wipe out the rival leader who ordered the hit on his girlfriend. Meanwhile, one of the witnesses from the first shooting is found dead in the boot of her car, and Harman suspects her husband may be responsible.
13	"Missing (Part 1)"	First appearances of DOPA Mia Perry and James Tennant; Andrew Sachs guest stars	David Holroyd	Chris Ould	15 February 2006	390
Harman and Hollis attend the report of a seven-year-old schoolgirl who has disappeared. Sim is assigned as Family Liaison officer and immediately notices the violent tendencies of the young girl's father. As Nixon and Hemmingway organise a search party, De Costa and Perkins begin trawling through all of the known sex offenders in the area. Meanwhile, Hunter reviews CCTV from nearby shops and is angered when the shop assistant proves to be less than helpful. As Manson organises a press conference, De Costa confirms that all of the known local paedophiles in the area have alibis, and inconsistencies in the father's account of his whereabouts start to look suspicious.
14	"Missing (Part 2)"	Final appearances of CAD Officer Dean McVerry and Cindy Hunter; Tara Moran guest stars	David Holroyd	Chris Smyth	22 February 2006	391
Sim applies the pressure when James Tennant fails to supply a convincing alibi for the unaccounted minutes in his timeline. When a phone call comes through to the incident room supposedly made by Amy, CID track the call to nearby Sherbourne Park and find a young boy who has been robbed and attacked. When they discover the boy is the best friend of Amy's step-brother, Todd, Manson discovers that the phone used to make the call belonged to the boy and that his sister was the person faking Amy's voice. Meanwhile, a witness comes forward claiming to have proof of James Tennant's violent behaviour, but Hemmingway's failure to take her seriously results in a leak to the press.
15	"High Risk Decisions"	Micah Balfour and Oscar James guest star	Nigel Douglas	Jonte Richardson	23 February 2006	392
Manson and the team continue to interview potential witnesses in the Amy Tennant case. As Perkins and De Costa interview Amy's gymnastics teacher, they discover that a parent of one of the children made a complaint when the man entered the girls changing room, claiming to be looking for a missing purse. When they discover that the man is in fact a former sex offender who has changed his name, he soon becomes prime suspect in Amy's disappearance. Meanwhile, Nadir investigates when a war breaks out between members of the E1 gang – including the trashing of a snooker hall, an assault on the elderly owner, and then a shooting at a record shop run by Jordan Tomlin.
16	"Down Goes Another One"	Final appearance of DS Ramani DeCosta; Micah Balfour guest stars	Nigel Douglas	Jonathan Rich	1 March 2006	393
Nadir coaches a local youth into posing as an informant to use some shaky information from gang leader Jordan Tomlin as collateral for a raid on a supposed arms deal taking place between Asher Campbell and a well-known gun dealer. However, the sting backfires when only two of the promised eight automatic weapons are recovered. Perkins assists De Costa on her first investigation with the Child Abuse Unit when they investigate a possible case of neglect, which turns out to have been something much more sinister. Meanwhile, a witness finally comes forward to confirm James Tennant's alibi after a reconstruction of Amy's disappearance is broadcast on television.
17	"Experience and Education"	Return of Insp Gina Gold; Edna Doré and Jimmy Akingbola guest star	Alan Macmillan	Tom Higgins	2 March 2006	394
Valentine and Hardy investigate a man suspected of abusing his ex-wife when she refuses to let him have regular access to their son. However, Hardy is less than happy with Valentine's handling of the case – and openly accuses him of racism in front of the suspect, which forces Hemmingway to take him off the case. Meanwhile, Keane gets her first undercover experience when Nixon invites her to take part in an obbo to catch a callous thief posing as a security guard. However, Nixon soon finds herself trying to persuade the suspect not to make an official complaint after the heated interview turns physical, leading an irate Keane to give the suspect a slap in the face.
18	"A Rock and a Hard Place"	—	Alan Macmillan	Nicholas McInerny	8 March 2006	395
Nadir continues to press gang leader Jordan Tomlin for information on the whereabouts of the remaining Mac-10 guns missing from the sting. However, aware that it has become local knowledge that Tomlin has a copper in his pocket, one of Tomlin's rivals, Devon Power, corners him at a DJ contest at the local community centre, and delivers a fatal gunshot. Hardy is torn when he discovers that his cousin, Dominic, left the venue minutes before the shooting and suspects that he may have had something to do with the attack. When he discovers that Dominic was the one who let the gunman into the building via a fire escape, he vows to have nothing more to do with his wayward cousin.
19	"Connections (Part 1)"	Bill Treacher and Ben Onwukwe guest star	Nic Phillips	Stuart Morris	9 March 2006	396
Smithy finds himself on the wrong side of the Longmarsh heavies when he tries to help fellow inmate Jamie Wood stay out of trouble to secure his parole. When Wood is framed for stabbing troublemaker Chris Hammond, Smithy tries to secure evidence to prove that wing leader Martin Johnson was responsible for the attack. Meanwhile, an affair between a property manager and one of his office staff proves to be a vital lead in securing Smithy's freedom, as the team finally manage to establish a connection between Carl Caplan and Pete Larson, and begin to gather evidence to prove that the £25,000 loan that Caplan received was payment for his security as a false witness.
20	"Connections (Part 2)"	Bill Treacher, Ben Onwukwe and Graham McTavish guest star	Nic Phillips	Stuart Morris	15 March 2006	397
Smithy becomes determined to nail Johnson for the stabbing of Chris Hammond, and manages to convince one of the screws to let him run with the case. Meanwhile, Meadows asks DCI Keane from the DPS for his assistance in blowing open Pete Larson's scheme to frame Smithy for Louise's murder. As CID mount surveillance on both Joel Gates and Carl Caplan, they track Caplan to a meeting with one of Larson's heavies, Tommy Drake. They subsequently discover CCTV footage which confirms that Drake was the go-between who organised the deal between Larson and Caplan. As a delighted Smithy manages to catch Johnson and is informed of his impending release, Meadows gatecrashes Louise's funeral with a warrant for Pete Larson's arrest.
21	"A Bad Call (Part 1)"	—	David Innes Edwards	Jake Riddell	16 March 2006	398
Hemmingway leads a small team to a seemingly low risk gig at a nightclub. Tensions flare, not only in the lineups and in the crowd, but between probationer Hardy and trainer Valentine. The pair end up breaking up two separate scuffles outside that end with Hemmingway making a bad call, giving the bouncers the decision to clear the lineup quickly, and a number of false ticket holders are let into the club. Valentine and Hardy are forced to put their differences aside when attending to a crush victim, and when Valentine tries to evacuate an overflowing balcony, half of the club collapses. With revellers injured and several dead, the situation quickly spirals as the team try to rescue those trapped inside. As the structure becomes even more unstable, Valentine is seriously injured trying to prevent Hardy getting hit by debris.
22	"A Bad Call (Part 2)"	Final appearance of DCI Frank Keane; Eddie Nestor guest stars	David Innes Edwards	Jake Riddell	22 March 2006	399
The night shift officers from the nightclub incident are forced into a double shift when the DPS arrive in the midst of allegations of negligence. Hardy struggles to comprehend events, and admits to Hemmingway he considered complaining about Valentine's apparent racial prejudice, but the Acting Sergeant makes Hardy realise the error of his ways. Fletcher and Keane struggle to deal with the fallout of attending to two of the fatalities, with Fletcher attending the house of his victim's mother after losing his cool with the man whose car blocked fire exits at the back of the club. Meanwhile, Webb and Nixon investigate when Keane's first death call leads to a case of stolen identity. DCI Keane gets a reality check when his daughter challenges him for trying to shift blame for the nightclub incident onto Kapoor.
23	"High Flyers"	First appearance of DC Stuart Turner	Robert Knights	Chris Smyth	23 March 2006	400
Perkins and Sim investigate when a man is robbed and assaulted after visiting a prostitute. When they encounter pimp Sonny James, Meadows calls in DC Stuart Turner from West End Central, who has been trying to nail James for several years. When Turner discovers that James' rivalry with fellow pimp Gordon Kite has been re-ignited, the team lead a manhunt for James to secure his safety before Kite catches up with him. Fletcher and Casper deal with a number of angry bus passengers who have a grievance with their driver. When a bus later goes missing, the pair discover the driver they dealt with earlier doesn't work for the company any more.
24	"Special Relationships"	A/Sgt Yvonne Hemmingway returns to PC; James Bye guest stars	Robert Knights	Philip Gerard	29 March 2006	401
Turner continues his investigation into the murky world of pimps and prostitution as he investigates crime boss Craig Fenton, whom he suspects is dealing heroin and cocaine through a network of prostitutes. When one of Fenton's prostitutes is beaten within an inch of her life, Turner tries to convince her flat-mate to give evidence against Fenton and reveal the motive behind the attack. Meanwhile, Casper and Bryant deal with a ruckus between the husband of a school teacher and a pupil. Although the husband suspects that his wife has been playing away, Casper subsequently discovers that the teacher is addicted to heroin, and that the pupil in question is in fact her drug dealer. Meadows offers Turner a transfer and promotion to DS.
25	"Where We Belong (Part 1)"	DC Stuart Turner is promoted to DS; Bill Treacher guest stars	Jan Bauer	Clive Dawson	30 March 2006	402
The Hunter brothers are paired together to investigate the stabbing of a Syrian national. Suspicion immediately falls on GP Fiona Blakeston, although she claims that she does not know who the man is. The brothers are convinced that there is more to the case than meets the eye and soon discover a link to a major scale antique-smuggling operation. Steve subsequently confronts Phil over their relationship, and the conversation leads him to put in for a transfer. Meanwhile, Smithy returns to work, only to find himself and Hardy investigating his former cellmate Morris Leatherhead, after a laptop goes missing from his workplace. Convinced that a fellow employee has stolen the laptop to fund maternity wear, Ackland and Hollis operate a stop and search – but Bryant's failure to write up her CRIS report leaves the team in deep water.
26	"Where We Belong (Part 2)"	Phina Oruche and Bill Treacher guest star	Jan Bauer	Clive Dawson	5 April 2006	403
The Hunter brothers failure to gather enough evidence to keep antique smuggler Michael Hassan in custody, but having been wound up by both the shoddy interview and his brother's interference, Phil's next move leaves his brother's life hanging in the balance when two armed men douse him in petrol and threaten to set him alight. Smithy is forced to intervene when Morris Leatherhead trashes a kebab shop in an attempt to get taken back into prison. Meanwhile, following a near fatal beating on the Netherlake estate, Nadir and Perkins find themselves on the trail of two local youths blackmailing a number of older single men for protection money – in return for not branding them paedophiles.
27	"Brotherly Love"	Gerard Horan, Richard Lintern and John Woodvine guest star	Robert Del Maestro	Maxwell Young	6 April 2006	404
Hunter investigates the brutal attack on his brother and soon suspects that smuggling suspect Michael Hassan may have been responsible, as a way of taking revenge for their altercation following his arrest. He is proven correct and Hassan is arrested, but Steve is far from grateful, and reaffirms his desire to transfer away. Meanwhile, a hit-and-run leaves a young girl dead, and Stamp is forced to arrest one of his old friends whom Casper suspects may have been at the wheel of the car. However, investigations later reveal that the man's fiancée has been hiding a deadly secret. Turner and Nixon investigate a claim made by a concerned daughter after she suspects that her mother has been conned by a self-proclaimed 'lifestyle guru', who attempts to do a runner the moment the pair start to investigate.
28	"A Day to Remember"	First use of the new ITV end credits; final appearance of PC Steve Hunter; Phina Oruche and David Hargreaves guest star	Robert Del Maestro	Julia Wall	12 April 2006	405
Hunter and Nixon investigate when a young woman is found unconscious in an off licence, and claims she was raped the night before. With no evidence of the assailant to bear, Hunter suspects that the woman's boyfriend may be the attacker – but later discovers that he in fact brokered a deal with the landlord of his local pub, to clear his tab in return for offering his girlfriend for sex. When the defendant refutes that he did any such thing, Hunter decides to go commando and sleep with his solicitor in an attempt to broker a confession. After getting berated by Nixon for his methods, Hunter gets another earful when his brother Steve gives him what for on his last day at Sun Hill. Meanwhile, Ackland imposes a 'Dispersal Zone' on the Farleigh estate after an arson attack on an elderly resident by a group of local youths.
29	"A Glimmer of Hope"	First appearance of Rod Jessop; David Hargreaves guest stars	Michael Cocker	Isabelle Grey	13 April 2006	406
Manson re-opens the case into Amy Tennant's disappearance when an unidentified caller gets in contact with a local newspaper, claiming that he knows the whereabouts of the missing girl. Webb poses as a journalist in an attempt to meet with the caller, but the arrival of the press leads to the obbo going pear shaped. When Nadir discovers that the caller may be one of Amy's neighbours, Carl Barratt, the team trail him to an allotment where they find him burning a pile of personal belongings. Meanwhile, Ackland and Hollis are forced to toe the line with three local youths after an elderly resident on the Farleigh estate dies of a heart attack following a campaign of harassment.
30	"To Be A Hero"	Edward Peel guest stars	Michael Cocker	Mark Johnson	19 April 2006	407
Valentine returns to duty, and is partnered with Hardy to investigate an arson attack on the home of a social worker, but shows signs of cracking when Hardy risks his life to save the home's occupant. Valentine becomes determined to track down a witness to the incident who called for the fire brigade, only to discover that she isn't prepared to stand up in court and identify the arsonists. With one of the perpetrators appearing to have pimped out his own brother in return for blackmail money, Valentine tries to get the youth to cough up his brother to save his own skin. Meanwhile, Sim and Nadir investigate when a clinical registrar disappears after receiving a number of blackmail letters and threatening phone calls, but soon discover he may have left of his own accord.
31	"Echoes (Part 1)"	Hannah Waterman and Rocky Marshall guest star	Simon Massey	Richard Ommanney	20 April 2006	408
Webb and Perkins investigate the disappearance of two young schoolgirls, the daughters of Webb's old friends Fern and Tom Parker, concerned that their disappearance may be linked to the Amy Tennant case. As uniform begin a frantic search for the missing youngsters, Hemmingway and Bryant find them cowering in fear in the depths of a dark underpass. With the younger of the two siblings having been beaten across the head, the search begins for their attacker – and the team are soon track down their prime suspect, a local waterworks employee who was seen with the two children shortly before the attack. However, forensic analysis reveals a shocking new suspect.
32	"Echoes (Part 2)"	Hannah Waterman and Rocky Marshall guest star	Simon Massey	Tom Higgins	26 April 2006	409
Sim interviews Charlotte Parker in an attempt to find out what truly happened to her sister Molly. The girl initially denies all involvement until she crumbles under the overwhelming weight of the evidence against her, and subsequently makes a full confession. Webb confronts the girl's father following allegations that his behaviour against his wife was the catalyst for the attack. Meanwhile, Fletcher and Hardy investigate when the initial suspect in the case, Andrew Landor, is attacked and badly beaten in his flat. A number of witnesses claim that the attacker may have been one of Landon's workmates, Dave Peters – and Fletcher becomes determined to find out who has been covering for him.
33	"The Green Eyed Monster"	First appearance of SCP Matt Hinckley	Martin Hutchings	Neil Clarke	27 April 2006	410
Nixon and Turner investigate when two seemingly unconnected victims are attacked with a hammer and left for dead. When the pair discover that the two victims both undertook contract work for a cancer research laboratory, they begin to look at ex-employees of the company with a connection to animal rights groups. Having witnessed the first attack, Valentine is forced to cover his tracks after running from the scene following a traumatic flashback, leaving himself and Kapoor looking for a witness who does not exist. Meanwhile, Fletcher and Casper deal with a former boxing champion who has fallen on hard times – and is being blackmailed by the landlord of his local pub.
34	"Neglect of Duty"	Charles Venn, Bob Barrett, James Holmes and David Sterne guest star	Martin Hutchings	Sally Tatchell	3 May 2006	411
Sim and Nadir investigate when a man is found beaten and unconscious in a skip on a deserted industrial estate. With no apparent motive for the attack, it isn't until a friend of Fletcher's who owns a local boxing gym gives him some information on an illegal bare-knuckle fighting operation that the team finally discover who may have been responsible. Meanwhile, Hardy and Keane take the lead on a case of criminal damage – only for the case to take a surprising turn when the man confesses to murdering his own wife during the interview. However, with no evidence to prove his guilt, the pair are forced to let the man go.
35	"Pursuit"	James Buckley guest stars	Gill Wilkinson	Lisa Evans	4 May 2006	412
Fletcher and Keane assist Turner and Nixon on a new 'Capture Car' initiative brought in by Okaro, in an attempt to reduce car crime figures on the local estates. They discover a scam where cars are being stolen to order, abandoned and then picked up by a scrap metal dealer, with the person who gives the tip-off to the vehicle's location being given a cut of the profit. However, when Casper pursues a stolen vehicle which speeds off into the distance, Nixon and Turner suspect that not everybody involved is abandoning their loot – and uncover an elaborate plan by an ex-con to frame his brother for an armed robbery as way of payback for the time he served in prison.
36	"Up Against the Wall"	Sian Thomas and Justin Pickett guest stars	Gill Wilkinson	Andrew Taft	11 May 2006	413
Nadir and Hunter investigate when a number of witnesses make complaints against a market trader, claiming that the perfume that he sold them has left them with scarring and burns. When the pair discover that Chez Williams, one of Nadir's former informants, has been running cases of the perfume to local pubs and clubs, they attempt to use him to crack the case. Meanwhile, Turner and Nixon investigate a suspicious death when a couple claim to have found an unidentified body in their living room. Hardy and Keane investigate when they suspect that a young man is faking his mother's dementia to steal her personal possessions, but Hardy isn't convinced of the man's guilt.
37	"Too Little, Too Late (Part 1)"	Hannah Waterman, Rocky Marshall and Simon Day guest star	Olivia Lichtenstein	Sarah-Louise Hawkins	18 May 2006	414
Stamp and Hollis are called to investigate a domestic disturbance at the home of the Parker family, and discover that Tom has once again beaten his wife, Fern. Webb tries to convince Fern to leave Tom, but his efforts are in vain – later that day, Stamp and Hollis are asked to attend the property once again and find Tom dead on the kitchen floor. Meanwhile, Sim investigates a campaign of abuse against a local bar, but soon discovers that the owner may himself be responsible to frame his closest rival. Kapoor and Bryant investigate a firecracker attack on a local pensioner, but Bryant is upset to learn that her son Liam and his friend Gareth may be responsible for the attack.
38	"Too Little, Too Late (Part 2)"	Final appearance of PC Laura Bryant; Hannah Waterman, Fiona Allen and Ron Moody guest star	Olivia Lichtenstein	Patrick Wilde	25 May 2006	415
DI Steph Radcliffe of MIT is seconded to Sun Hill to investigate the death of Tom Parker. Fern initially pleads self-defence, claiming Tom was about to attack her. However, under interrogation, she cracks and reveals that she murdered Tom out of rage, and that Webb coached her to plead self-defence – forcing Meadows to defend Webb under the scrutiny of MIT. Meanwhile, Kapoor and Bryant investigate an assault on a local pensioner. They soon discover that a motive of racial abuse may be behind the assault, but discover that the man was diagnosed with Alzheimer's some months previously. After Bryant tells Gold she wants to resign, Kapoor tries to convince her to look into a position with the Safer Neighbourhood team at Barton Street.
39	"Desperation and Jealousy"	Jacquetta May and Justin Pickett guest star	Andrew Gunn	Scott Cherry	31 May 2006	416
Nadir and Hunter investigate an apparent protection racket following a tip-off from Nadir's informant. However, Hunter is suspicious that not all could be as it seems when one of the victims hands over more than £2,000 in cash. Their subsequent investigation uncovers a plot to have a couple murdered, forcing Perkins to go undercover as the contract killer. Meanwhile, a crash between an ambulance and a car soon turns awry when a convicted murderer, who has been sentenced to life in prison, escapes from the back of the ambulance. Gold soon discovers that the occupant of the car has visited the prisoner several times while he has been in jail, and that the crash is no coincidence.
40	"The Quiet Ones"	Marshall Lancaster and Frank Jarvis guest star	Andrew Gunn	Chris Smyth	1 June 2006	417
Hunter and Sim investigate when a toddler is found wandering the streets covered in blood – blood that doesn't belong to him. With both of his parents missing, it becomes a race against time to save them from one another – but when the boy's father is found slumped in a shallow grave in some woodland, Hunter and Sim try to uncover the truth behind two conflicting accounts of domestic violence. Meanwhile, Nixon and Turner investigate a stabbing in the local shopping centre. The victim is shaky when attempting to identify his attacker, but determined to get a result, Turner pressures him into positively identifying his prime suspect, Trey Harper – who soon turns out to be innocent.
41	"Mistaken and Misspoken"	First appearance of DAC Georgia Hobbs; Ross Boatman guest stars	Reza Moradi	Carolyn Sally Jones	7 June 2006	418
Nixon and Turner investigate the shooting of a twelve-year-old boy, but suspect that his version of events is somewhat alternate to the truth. When the gun used in the shooting is identified as the same weapon involved in a shooting six years previously, suspicion falls on the boy's godfather. When the boy reveals that one of his school friends was responsible for the shooting, Hardy is left alone to confront the attacker when Valentine suffers another panic attack. Meanwhile, Fletcher and Keane investigate a burglary involving two young housemates, but after questioning one of the housemates' ex-boyfriends, soon suspect that the supposed 'burglary' may be nothing more than a scam. DAC Hobbs tells Okaro that the borough commander job is all but his, but when Annette Tomlin challenges him over the events surrounding her son Jordan's death yet again, he makes a snap decision that could scupper his chances of promotion.
42	"Lack of Restraint"	First appearance of TDC Kezia Walker; Ken Campbell guest stars	Reza Moradi	Chris Ould	8 June 2006	419
Sim and new trainee DC Kezia Walker are paired together to investigate a suspected rape, where the victim has no memory of the attack itself. With little DNA evidence and no witnesses to the attack itself, Walker's only lead in the form of an aggressive beggar falls flat when she manages to provide himself with an alibi. Meanwhile, uniform tackle two less than ordinary cases. Stamp and Fletcher attempt to find a burglar using his dog, whom he left at the crime scene. Before that, however, they must find a way to disarm the angry mutt. Valentine and Hardy pull an elderly drink-driver who fools Hardy with the 'little old lady' routine, until Valentine discovers a long list of previous convictions. Following his run in with Annette Tomlin, Hobbs offers Okaro an ultimatum; apologise or kiss goodbye to the borough commander's job.
43	"Better the Devil You Know"	Denise Welch and Kelly George guest star	David Innes Edwards	Geoff Lindsay	14 June 2006	420
Nadir and Hunter attempt to track down a group of drug dealers who plied a 13-year-old girl with heroin, causing her to overdose. When Nadir attempts to use the girl's brother to identify the main suppliers, in return for helping the police, the boy is beaten up and crippled. Meanwhile, Valentine and Hardy deal with an assault at the local swimming pool – where one of the suspects shoves Keane in the pool! Despite initial suggestions it is a simple domestic, the team later discover that the feud is much more interesting than they first thought – and their investigations lead them to a buried safe containing more than £70,000 in jewellery. Gold sends Valentine on leave after almost crashing the area car during a reckless pursuit of the suspects, leaving Kapoor and Ackland to track down the thieves. Okaro prepares to hand over the reins as he accepts the post of Borough Commander.
44	"Hit the Ground Running"	Supt Adam Okaro is promoted to Ch Supt; first appearance of Supt John Heaton; Ram John Holder, Troy Titus-Adams and Keeley Forsyth guest star	David Innes Edwards	Jonathan Rich	22 June 2006	421
Hunter and Nadir continue on their quest to nail drug dealer Tom Dwyer, but the arrival of new Superintendent John Heaton sees the investigation take an exciting turn of pace when Heaton tasks his officers to catch Dwyer – any way possible. Heaton even hauls in the boy's grandfather on a minor drugs charge in an attempt to use family loyalty as a method of breaking the case. Meanwhile, Sim and Walker investigate a further allegation of suspected rape and soon come to realise that a serial rapist, with a link to minicabbing, could be operating in the area. However, with little evidence to identify a suspect, the pair's investigation soon comes to a halt before it's even barely started.
45	"One Man's Meat"	First appearance of Kristen Shaw; Justin Pickett guest stars	Nigel Douglas	Julian Perkins	28 June 2006	422
Harman attends an RTA, but is left puzzled by the actions of a witness, who hands her a blanket covered in blood. Meanwhile, a bag full of rotten meat is found dumped on some wasteground and a number of angry restaurateurs complain after a wave of food poisoning strikes a local health club bistro. Nixon and Webb discover that an employee of the local meat processing plant has been on the take, but uncover a large scale scam involving the sale of rancid meat long past its sell by date. Meanwhile, Hunter and Nadir speak to the owner of the health club and discover that it could be a front for a major money laundering operation, and that the club has links to dealer Kristen Shaw.
46	"Cut Your Losses"	Justin Pickett guest stars	Nigel Douglas	Emma Goodwin	29 June 2006	423
Nadir attempts to use former informant Chez Williams as a way of arranging a meeting with Kristen Shaw, so arranges for Hunter to plant evidence in Chez's van in an attempt to fool Chez into thinking he has become corrupt. Nadir then uses Heaton's latest initiative of targeting all street dealers in the area as a way of working himself onto Kristen's payroll. Meanwhile, Webb encounters Andrew Landor again when uniform haul him in for being unable to account for a large sum of money found in his possession. Suspecting that he has become embroiled in a counterfeit DVD scam, uniform trail Landor and discover a number of illegal private screenings being held at the local cinema.
47	"The Devil's Advocate (Part 1)"	Sian Webber guest stars	Paul Wroblewski	Adrian Pagan	6 July 2006	424
Sim and Walker find themselves investigating their third reported rape case in two weeks, but are shocked when the victim identifies Stamp as her attacker. Stamp makes no denial of trying to help the girl after finding her in distress, but thanks to work from Smithy, Walker manages to help the girl gather some idea of her timeline, which puts Stamp in the clear. Walker then decides to mount an undercover operation in the hope of catching the attacker. Meanwhile, Manson investigates a dodgy medium who claims to have had visions of Amy Tennant – but first must work out how she managed to steal a doll belonging to Amy from her bedroom and plant it in the woods. Sim applies for a DS post with the Kidnap Squad, only for Turner to subsequently apply for the post too.
48	"To Those Who Wait (Part 2)"	Final appearance of DC Suzie Sim; Keeley Forsyth guest stars	Paul Wroblewski	Sally Tatchell	18 July 2006	425
Walker's operation backfires when the team's prime suspect turns out to being nothing more than a bag snatcher. However, when one of the former victims is contacted by her attacker, the team discover that the culprit is a driver from Stamp's cab firm. As Stamp attempts to do some digging, the attacker contacts his victim again, and Stamp is able to identify him. However, forensic evidence only links the suspect to one of the attacks. Meanwhile, Fletcher and Keane deal with a teenage girl who has entered an abusive relationship with an older boy in an attempt to gain access to alcohol. Sim gets the DS job with the Kidnap Squad, beating Turner to the post, while Hinckley tells Keane he is joining Sun Hill as the new CPS Lawyer.
49	"Karma"	Kierston Wareing, Stephen North, Catherine Bailey and Tommy Knight guest star	Alan Macmillan	Matthew Leys	19 July 2006	426
Turner and Webb investigate when an armed robber disappears following a blag at a local convenience store. However, when CCTV shows the shopkeeper beating seven bells out of the robber with a cricket bat, the pair realise that time may be running out, and that they must find the victim before he succumbs to any harm. A vital lead in the case comes when the team identify the robber's vehicle as an abandoned scooter which Smith and Hollis dealt with earlier. Meanwhile, Heaton continues to promote his zero tolerance policy, and urges arrests for petty offences, beginning with a crackdown on crime at the nearby Penn Market – and Hardy finds a new investigative ally in Hinckley.
50	"Harder They Fall"	Gillian Wright, Cerrie Burnell and Fox Jackson-Keen guest star	Alan Macmillan	Tom Needham	20 July 2006	427
Heaton mounts an operation to catch a relatively small-time drug dealer in an attempt to get the names of his suppliers – but the operation doesn't go completely to plan, leaving the hard evidence pointing towards the dealer's wife. However, Hardy isn't prepared to watch an innocent woman go to jail, and convinces the woman to spill the beans on her husband. Meanwhile, Fletcher and Casper investigate a case of criminal damage involving the owner of the local go-kart stadium, but discover his actions towards a disabled customer to be less than desired, and Perkins' misjudgment of the Max Little case leaves the man's mother in serious danger, after he turns up on her doorstep.
51	"Thrown to the Wolves"	James Greene guest stars	Robert Knights	Simon J. Ashford	26 July 2006	428
Walker and Perkins investigate a burglary with a twist – the apparent culprit has been shot and kneecapped by the property's owners, Anna and George Talbot. However, when they discover the victim is Anna's first husband, Jan, they uncover a string of fake marriages and con tricks, whereby Anna has been marrying vulnerable older men to get her hands on their money. Meanwhile, Smith and Hollis arrest the driver of a vehicle reportedly involved in a hit-and-run – but when the suspect turns out to be one of Kristen Shaw's henchmen, she asks Nadir to retrieve the car for her. Valentine and Hardy investigate a targeted campaign of abuse against arson witness Kathy Clarke.
52	"Bad Day at the Office"	Gary Webster and Kevin Doyle guest star	Robert Knights	Maxwell Young	27 July 2006	429
Perkins investigates when a young girl is found unconscious after taking two suspicious 'E' tablets, but is even more shocked to discover that his daughter, Holly, may have secured the drugs for her from her boyfriend. In an attempt to catch her dealer in the act, Perkins poses as a buyer and is introduced to the boy's supplier, Paul Haskew, who offers him a major score. Just as the deal is about to go down, an armed gang ambush Perkins and Manson and manage to take off with more than £3,000 in cash and an evidence stash of skunk worth more than £6,000. Hunter isn't too pleased to discover that Nadir may have been the one who blew the operation, by warning Kristen Shaw of the impending bust.
53	"The Lines We Shouldn't Cross"	Gary Webster guest stars	Robert Del Maestro	Stuart Morris	2 August 2006	430
Nadir fights to maintain his position within Kristen Shaw's organisation after Paul Haskew warns her against using Nadir for protection. In a bid to prove his worth, Nadir, along with assistance from Meadows and Heaton, arranges for one of Haskew's major dealers, Vernon Myer, to be busted while in possession of a large quantity of cocaine. Meanwhile, Turner and Nixon investigate when an arson attack on a garage on the Jasmine Allen estate results in the loss of a collection of exhibition paintings. The pair initially suspect the owner's best friend, who appears to have somewhat of an obsession with his com padre – until CCTV footage proves his innocence.
54	"Almost Human"	Sheila Reid and John Woodvine guest star	Robert Del Maestro	Julian Perkins	3 August 2006	431
Nixon and Hunter investigate a distraction burglary at a telecommunications warehouse, but Turner is forced to step in when Hunter's son is taken ill. Their first major lead in the case comes in the form of an engagement ring left behind at the scene by one of the perpetrators. However, their real breakthrough doesn't come until they discover one of the perpetrators has a penchant for phoning adult sex lines while the burglary is being committed. Meanwhile, Ackland and Stamp investigate when an elderly resident at a care home disappears, along with the caretaker – and her life savings, and Walker is furious when the CPS drop the case against serial rapist Keith Durante.
55	"Moving On"	Thomas Morrison guest stars	Simon Massey	Simon Moss	10 August 2006	432
Nixon and Turner investigate the hijacking of a heavy goods lorry which results in the theft of £150,000 worth of computer chips, as well as a substantial amount of other electrical goods. However, when they find half of the missing haul in a lock-up belonging to an employee of the company, they realise that the computer chips may not have been aboard the lorry in the first place – and must stop the business directors eloping with a tidy profit. Meanwhile, Manson is forced to intervene when James Tennant commits a burglary, convinced he has found the hiding place where Amy is being kept, and Walker is reprimanded for continuing the investigation into serial rapist Keith Durante.
56	"Chasing Shadows"	Bobby Lockwood and Keeley Forsyth guest star	Simon Massey	Simon Moss	16 August 2006	433
Walker believes she has found the breakthrough she was waiting for when rape suspect Keith Durante begins to stalk one of his victims, Beth Adamson. Manson gives Durante a caution for harassment, but ignores all boundaries and tries to contact Beth by phone. Believing she can finally nail Durante, Walker is devastated when Beth agrees to meet Durante, and the evidence against him falls apart. Meanwhile, Valentine and Hardy find themselves delivering a baby when they attend the scene of a crash, but elation turns to intrigue when they find a suspicious package of cocaine in the boot of the crashed vehicle. Perkins is forced to break up a row between Max Little and his brother, Taylor.
57	"A Different Type of Threat (Part 1)"	Stuart McQuarrie, Amber Agar and Peter Bankole guest star	Bill Scott-Rider	Steve Griffiths	17 August 2006	434
Fletcher is handpicked by officers from Special Branch to infiltrate the "Racial Defence Army", a local right-wing group whom Special Branch suspect are about to carry out a major-scale attack on London. Posing as a racist police officer, Fletcher asks his friend Ewan, already a member of the group, to arrange a meeting with group leader Robert Barry. Fletcher is initially welcomed into the fold, until another member of the group, Nick, becomes suspicious when the group's plan to kidnap a radical Muslim cleric goes wrong. Nick then carries out a kidnapping of his own – but when his plans are once again thwarted, Nick confronts Fletcher and discovers that he is working undercover.
58	"A Different Type of Threat (Part 2)"	Stuart McQuarrie guest stars	Sylvie Boden	Steve Griffiths	23 August 2006	435
Fletcher realises that his cover may still be intact, and the team attempt to dig up as much evidence on Nick as possible to allow them to refuse him the right to any communication with the outside world. Later, Fletcher and Ewan are confronted by a group of angry Muslims following Nick's outburst the previous day, but Keane arrives in the midst of the confrontation and catches Fletcher about to commit an assault. Unaware he is undercover, Keane reports Fletcher to Heaton, who has no choice but to 'suspend' him – making the perfect cover for Fletcher to reconvene with Robert Barry, who the team discover now plans to plant a live bomb to frame a radical Muslim group.
59	"Love and Loss"	Gillian Wright, Les Dennis, Katy Cavanagh and Rupert Farley guest star	Diana Patrick	Steve Trafford	24 August 2006	436
Nixon and Hunter investigate when a pensioner is found sealed in the freezer of his own basement. Initial suspicion falls on the elderly man's cleaner, who appears to have been accepting a more than generous wage as well as a number of gifts from her employer. However, Nixon is convinced that the man's son isn't telling the whole truth and soon comes to realise that he may have been trying to frame the cleaner to throw the scent from himself. Meanwhile, Perkins' day goes from bad to worse when he ends up receiving a beating while trying to protect Max Little, before investigating a dodgy translator representing a Togolese national who has been accused of theft by her employers.
60	"Fool's Gold"	Gary Webster guest stars	Diana Patrick	Len Collin	30 August 2006	437
Valentine and Hardy attend the scene when paramedics find a young boy who has fallen into a coma after accidentally taking heroin posing as baby formula. Despite the mother's initial objections to talk, she reluctantly agrees to give up her partner, who has been working as a dealer for Marlin Vickers – a major rival of Kristen Shaw. When Manson discovers that Nadir has been working undercover, he presses Meadows to finish the op to allow him to bust Vickers and Shaw in one fell swoop. However, Nadir isn't pleased with the governor's interference and goes behind his back, tipping off Shaw of the impending raid – a move which looks to have finally secured him her trust and loyalty.
61	"Beyond the Call of Duty"	Barbara Wilshere guest star	Roberto Bangura	Simon Moss	31 August 2006	438
Nadir and Walker investigate a fire at the warehouse of a clothing supplier, but Walker suspects that all isn't as it seems when she and Harman discover a stash of fake stock in the apartment of one of the business directors. With CCTV proving that he was at the warehouse on the night of the fire, the pair are convinced they have found their man – until some crucial evidence takes the case in a completely different direction. Meanwhile, Valentine continues to support witness Kathy Clarke after she is attacked by one of the relatives of the defendant she is testifying against in the arson case, and when Kristen Shaw is assaulted, Nadir takes matters into his own hands and confronts her attacker.
62	"Salvation"	Kelli Hollis guest stars	Roberto Bangura	Mark Johnson	6 September 2006	439
Ackland and Valentine attend a road traffic accident involving a disturbed young woman who has little recollection of wandering into the road. Later, they are called to the scene of an assault and find the woman attacking a bailiff who is attempting to repossess her car. Valentine is less than sympathetic to the accused, until they later find the woman atop a derelict multi-story car park, threatening to jump. Meanwhile, Manson leads the investigation into the assault on drug dealer Louis Drake, but when he identifies Nadir as his attacker, Nadir is forced to fake an alibi and an investigation report in an attempt to cover his tracks, but Manson isn't entirely convinced of his innocence.
63	"A Spanner in the Works"	John Woodvine and Shaun Prendergast guest star	Gill Wilkinson	Richard Ommanney	7 September 2006	440
Nixon and Turner investigate the stabbing of a recently released armed robber, who is found aboard his houseboat alongside a stash of cocaine. With two possible motives for the attack, the pair visit one of the robber's victims, who was crippled after being shot during a post office raid. However, evidence soon points towards his son when a mobile phone belonging to him is found at the scene. Meanwhile, following a spate of bad press reports, Heaton demands high visibility patrols of the Jasmine Allen estate. Stamp and Kapoor find themselves investigating three thefts, and discover that a young boy, who is trying to propose to his girlfriend, stole the items as he was unable to pay for them.
64	"Little Black Book"	First appearance of PC Diane Noble; Dudley Sutton, Amelda Brown and Corinne Skinner-Carter guest star	Gill Wilkinson	Sally Tatchell	13 September 2006	441
Heaton organises a raid on a crack house, but little goes to plan when the target drug dealer escapes, an elderly woman is found locked in squalor in the property, and two seriously ill neighbours find their door being kicked in when Heaton suspects that the suspect may be hiding in their attic. When the team finally catch up with the dealer, he denies all knowledge of anyone being held captive, until they discover that the elderly victim is his grandmother – and that he has been using her house as a crack factory. Meanwhile, Smith is paired with recently transferred PC Diane Noble to investigate an assault on a homeless alcoholic, but the attacker turns out to be someone they least suspect.
65	"One Last Try (Part 1)"	Final appearance of Ch Supt Adam Okaro; John Woodvine and Keeley Forsyth guest star	Reza Moradi	Tom Higgins	14 September 2006	442
Walker re-opens the case into rapist Keith Durante when one of his victims, Beth Adamson, reports that he has been following her and making harassing phone calls. In an attempt to trap him once and for all, she enlists Meadows' help to set up an operation to catch Durante in the act, but the operation goes pear-shaped. However, when Beth later disappears, Walker tries to break Durante's wife in an attempt to find out where Beth could be. Meanwhile, a spate of car thefts on the Antrim Green estate sees Heaton step up patrols, but an unwitting Stamp and Kapoor fall for a distraction theft while rescuing a cat when the wheels of their area car are punctured and their rear number plate stolen. After both parties receiving a talking to from Okaro, Heaton and Gold find common ground.
66	"One Last Try (Part 2)"	Keeley Forsyth guest stars	Reza Moradi	Tom Higgins	19 September 2006	443
Walker interviews Keith Durante from his hospital bed, but soon comes to realise that despite all that has happened, he does not blame victim Beth Adamson for attacking him. She decides to set up one last meet between the pair in the hope that Durante will finally see sense and confess to his crime – and after speaking with Beth Adamson, Durante's wife withdraws the alibis she gave him for the nights of the three rapes. Meanwhile, Nixon and Hunter investigate a fire in a guest house. They discover that the property was home to a number of illegal immigrants, but despite Hunter being convinced that they have their prime suspect, Nixon continues to dig until she reaches a breakthrough.
67	"Long Lost Conscience"	Danny Webb and John Woodvine guest star	Jan Baeur	Emma Goodwin	20 September 2006	444
Webb and Walker investigate when a campaign of harassment and hate-mail leads Keith Durante's wife Louise to try to commit suicide. Webb manages to track down the anonymous neighbour who alerted the police, but he refuses to identify any of those involved – until it becomes apparent that the father of one of Durante's victims may be involved. Meanwhile, Hollis and Stamp are annoyed when Smithy gives them the case of investigating a dog-napping – until Hollis' persistence with the case leads to the discovery of a lead into a missing persons case and possibly even a murder. However, Stamp is distracted when his father is admitted to hospital with a serious chest infection.
68	"Immunity"	Steven Pinder and John Woodvine guest star	Jan Baeur	Nicholas McInerny	21 September 2006	445
Webb witnesses a drug deal on his way to work, but when he confronts the buyer, he discovers that he was actually buying several ampules of hospital-grade morphine. Meanwhile, while out on patrol, Casper and Fletcher find a man collapsed in the street, and soon discover that he has overdosed on a similar sample of morphine to that found by Webb earlier. As Perkins discovers that a quantity of morphine has disappeared from the pharmacy at St. Hugh's hospital, Webb pressures the dealer to give up the name of his supplier, but the breakthrough comes when Casper identifies a woman caught on CCTV outside the dealer's house as a hospital sister that he questioned earlier in the day. Stamp and his sister reminisce after their father's cardiac arrest the night before, and after calling in the crash team against his sister's wishes, Stamp realises he has to make a difficult decision.
69	"A Little Holiday (Part 1)"	—	Robert Knights	Jake Ridell	27 September 2006	446
Turner investigates when a Romanian prostitute is thrown into the path of a moving police car. A trace of the vehicle used in the attack leads Turner to an abandoned warehouse, where he finds a number of trafficked sex workers who are being held against their will. After trying to drop a statement in his own trafficking operation, witness Andrei Balev tells Nixon that his wife has been kidnapped, forcing Hunter and Nixon to merge their investigation with Turner’s, and Heaton calls in SOCA for a joint operation. When the team's prime suspect flees the UK, Hunter and Nixon are sent to Bucharest to liaise with the Romanian police. Hunter mounts his own operation, but the operation goes badly wrong when he realises a mole has tipped off their prime suspect, and things spiral when Nixon and Hunter find themselves ambushed in a drive-by shooting.
70	"A Little Holiday (Part 2)"	—	Robert Knights	Jake Ridell	28 September 2006	447
Nixon and Hunter try to process their near death experience in the previous night's shooting, as well as their unexpected passion in the aftermath. Suspecting local Inspector Bogdan Cazacu of being the mole in Nastase and Gilcu's operation, their investigation is sidetracked when Hunter's informant is found dead. As Turner continues to get info from assault victim Maia, she drops a bombshell that leaves Nixon and Hunter in grave danger. With evidence to arrest Nastaste, there are hopes that associate Gilcu can point them in the direction of Andrei Balev's wife Petya, until Gilcu is injured after being shot by a Romanian police officer. London-based pimp Marius is arrested and orders for a female to be “disposed of”, leaving the Sun Hill team scrambling to find Petya before it's too late.
71	"Turning the Tables (Part 1)"	Adam Deacon, Bobby Lockwood and Rupert Farley guest star	David Innes Edwards	Andrew Taft	4 October 2006	448
Casper and Fletcher are called to the scene of a disturbance at a truck stop café, but the owner refuses to speak out against those involved. Meanwhile, Perkins is tailing ex-con Max Little's son, Taylor, after Max informs him that the boy has been running errands for crook Barry Green. When Perkins witnesses the café owner handing over money to Taylor, he suspects that Green has been using Taylor as part of a protection racket. Meanwhile, Hemmingway and Harman deal with a group of youths who are bullying a homeless man, and when they find the ringleader spraying down the man, Hemmingway turns the washer on the yob – but despite positive feedback, she is suspended.
72	"Control of Impulse (Part 2)"	Gillian Wright, Bobby Lockwood and Rupert Farley guest star	David Innes Edwards	Julia Wall	5 October 2006	449
Perkins finally gets café owner Robbie Owen to cough, and he reveals that Green bribed him to hire out his café to seal a deal against a delivery of illegal cigarettes from Spain. Perkins sets up an operation to catch Green in the act, but the operation goes pear-shaped, and he soon discovers Max Little's son Taylor in possession of a bloodstained knife. Little then tries to throw Green off a motorway bridge, but Perkins manages to switch the situation around to his advantage. Meanwhile, Hollis and Kapoor investigate when a homeless man is robbed, but when they discover he is an illegal immigrant, Kapoor's conscience gets the better of her and she lets the man escape.
73	"Hold Feet to the Fire"	—	David Holroyd	Tom Higgins	11 October 2006	450
Hardy and Hemmingway investigate when a young girl reports her father missing following a break-in at his home, and later discover that he was kidnapped by the attacker. After initially suspecting an ex-employee of his company, Hemmingway later discovers that one of the man's former school friends decided to take his revenge on him following a sustained campaign of bullying. However, as she and Hardy close in to make an arrest, the suspect flees onto a bus, where he holds Hemmingway and six other passengers hostage at gunpoint. Meanwhile, Fletcher and Keane arrest a youth for shoplifting and dealing in stolen CDs on the basis of video footage found on a mislaid mobile phone.
74	"The Wrong Man"	Ricky Champ guest stars	David Holroyd	Jonathan Rich	12 October 2006	451
Webb is arrested on a charge of rape after a woman who he spent the night with accuses him of attacking her. Nadir poses as his fed rep to get close to the two officers from Mill Street who are investigating the case, and soon manages to locate two further suspects for the attack, both of whom have means and motive for the attack. Meadows tries to get to the bottom of why Webb has adopted a party lifestyle and warns him to clean up his act. Meanwhile, Harman and Fletcher attend to an RTA, where the victim accuses the driver of drink-driving – however, with the driver lying unconscious in hospital, Fletcher decides to take a blood sample to prove his guilt – but the sample subsequently disappears.
75	"The Long Arm of the Law"	Gary Webster and Justin Pickett guest star	Michael Cocker	Sarah-Louise Hawkins	18 October 2006	452
Gold leads an operation into clearing a red light district of streetwalkers. Harman and Keane arrest two prostitutes for breach of the peace, but Harman soon links one of them to a robbery. Kapoor and Casper deal with a man also looking for a prostitute, whom he suspects of robbing him. However, when he collapses, Kapoor discovers that he has serious head injuries. Meanwhile, Nadir subsequently arranges for one of the prostitutes arrested by Harman to be released as a favour for Kristen Shaw and Paul Haskew – but when the girl is found badly beaten, Manson discovers she is a Colombian drugs mule, and that Shaw could be involved in something much greater than they expected.
76	"Take Aim"	Gary Webster guest stars	Michael Cocker	Frank Rickarby	19 October 2006	453
Webb investigates when prostitute Carrie Morgan disappears after picking up a late-night punter at the local pub. When a witness identifies one of the pub staff as the punter, Webb interviews a cagey father and son who both deny any involvement in the disappearance. Meanwhile, Nadir confronts Kristen Shaw and Paul Haskew over the assault of drugs mule Eva Garcia, with Meadows and Heaton turning the situation to their benefit by falsely claiming Garcia died of her injuries, allowing Nadir to broker a meet between himself and drugs kingpin Jose Alvarez. However, when he is confronted at gunpoint, he is forced to take drastic action to keep Alvarez on side and rescue an otherwise sinking deal – but his actions sees him finally win Haskew's trust.
77	"The Big Day (Part 1)"	Adam Deacon and Antony Booth guest star	Robert Del Maestro	Chris Ould	25 October 2006	454
Hemmingway and Harman investigate a break-in at a doctor's surgery, but the situation becomes complicated when they catch youth Billy Aldridge in possession of a quantity of stolen drugs samples. When the surgery receptionist confesses to the crime, Hemmingway suspects that she is trying to take the rap for someone else – but also has suspicions that the GP running the surgery has something to hide. Later, she confronts Aldridge, who claims the doctor paid him to keep quiet about the fact that he is sleeping with an under-age girl. Meanwhile, Perkins helps Keane and Fletcher trap a cowboy builder with a sideline in blackmail, and Fletcher is assaulted on his way home from work.
78	"The Big Day (Part 2)"	Adam Deacon and Souad Faress guest star	Robert Del Maestro	Chris Ould	26 October 2006	455
Hemmingway and Nadir investigate Billy Aldridge's accusation against his doctor, but the case comes on the anniversary of Nadir's sister's death, leading him to lose his cool in front of the suspect. With the girl refusing to corroborate Aldridge's story, the case looks all but set to collapse until Nadir ranks up the pressure. Meanwhile, Perkins investigates the assault on Fletcher, but convinced that Hinckley was behind the assault, Fletcher turns up on his doorstep and gives him a friendly punch in the face. When Stamp and Hollis stop a man in possession of Fletcher's warrant card, he identifies the two men who attacked Fletcher as Hinckley's usher and best man for his wedding to Keane, but Fletcher refuses to pursue the case.
79	"Sum and Substance"	Helen Griffin guest stars	Sallie Apprahamian	Kathrine Smith	2 November 2006	456
Turner and Nixon investigate an arson attack on a foster home, and suspect the boyfriend of the owner's daughter may be responsible. Unconvinced that the man's watertight alibi is kosher, Turner continues to dig and discovers several links to the B&B fire that he and Nixon investigated several weeks before, while witnesses place the suspect at the scene of both attacks. Meanwhile, after investigating a laptop theft, Hunter and Webb set up an operation to catch a scammer trying to sell on illegally smuggled banknotes from the US, which have been coated in black paint to avoid customs, after several of the supposed notes turn out to be nothing more than blank sheets of paper.
80	"Honour Amongst Thieves"	First appearance of Sgt Nikki Wright; Sylvester McCoy and Nitin Ganatra guest star	Sallie Apprahamian	Graham Mitchell	8 November 2006	457
Ackland and Noble attend when Barton Street Sergeant Nikki Wright comes across a man with stab wounds on the shoreline of the River Thames. Meanwhile, Stamp and Hemmingway are on the trail of two armed robbers who have just held up a bookies' headquarters at gunpoint. In the ensuing chase, the getaway vehicle comes face to face with the ambulance carrying Wright and the stab victim, resulting in a pile-up and standoff between the gunman and police. Wright negotiates with the gunman while waiting for CO19; however, the second robber manages to escape in the chaos of the crash. When the driver is arrested, the passenger, managing director of the bookies Charlie May, reveals the other robber has abducted his girlfriend. When he conveniently remembers the journey to an abandoned house, his girlfriend is found, but Wright catches a crucial detail that suggests May is involved. Meanwhile, Ackland and Noble discover their stabbing victim is a recently released prisoner, jailed for manslaughter. Suspecting the father of his victim as the culprit, Ackland has to talk the man out of suicide when he climbs onto a bridge railing, intent on ending his life. Manson is forced to intervene when James Tennant is arrested for assault while fleeing the scene of the pile-up RTC involving the ambulance.
81	"Every Jack has his Jill"	Adam Deacon, Zoe Henry and Dean Gaffney guest star	Karl Neilson	Carolyn Sally Jones	9 November 2006	458
Webb investigates when prostitute Carrie Morgan is found after being the victim of a serious assault. Webb initially suspects that the attacker may be a punter that she picked up the previous night, but when Carrie regains consciousness, she claims that the beating was from her pimp, who found out that she was seeing customers without giving him his cut. Meanwhile, the investigation surrounding the doctor accused of sleeping with an under-age girl is re-opened after the young girl involved withdraws her statement. Hemmingway leans on youth Billy Aldridge in an attempt to get him to make a statement, but soon discovers that the reason the girl is frightened is because she is pregnant.
82	"Out With a Bang"	Final appearance of PC Yvonne Hemmingway; Zoe Henry and Adam Deacon guest star	Karl Neilson	Clive Dawson	15 November 2006	459
Hemmingway is given twenty-four hours to come up with the evidence to prove that Dr. Wilder is guilty of paedophilia, and working on an instinct that it may not be the first time he has committed such an offence, manages to find a link to another abuse victim. When she discovers that Wilder is still in contact with the boy, a raid on the boy's house uncovers a bedroom full of recording equipment and pornographic material. Heaton tells Hemmingway the vacant Sergeant's post can be hers if she gets a result, but Hobbs wants it to go to Wright from Barton Street, so she pulls strings to get the Youth Offending Team to offer her a Sergeant's post there. Meanwhile, Hunter sends Nixon and Turner on a wild-goose chase, but the case turns out to be much juicier than he first thought.
83	"A Stiff Upper Lip"	Peter Guinness, Nicola Stapleton, Linda Robson and Kevin Doyle guest star	Nic Phillips	Julian Perkins	22 November 2006	460
Smithy's day goes from bad to worse when a fight that breaks out in custody during a power failure turns into an attempted murder, when one of the prisoners is stabbed with a knife. With only four suspects who could have possibly committed the crime, the team attempt to work out which one of them could be responsible for the attack: David Coles, the husband of Perkins' ex-wife, who firstly assaults him and then Walker after he discovers Perkins' illicit affair with his wife; Julie Knights, the best friend of the victim; the victim's flat-mate, Ollie, who turns out to be the army sergeant of the victim's deceased son, and a woman who claims she is unable to even remember her own name – but is her supposed memory loss convenient?
84	"Go for Gold"	Peter Guinness and Souad Faress guest star	Nic Phillips	Sally Tatchell	29 November 2006	461
Fletcher is forced to fend off an accusation of assault after his attempt to break-up a fight between a man and his girlfriend outside the local nightclub goes horribly wrong. When the man's girlfriend corroborates his version of events – that Fletcher threw the first punch – his career seems all but over until Valentine discovers that a witness to the incident is not as innocent as he claims to be – which subsequently leads Hunter and Perkins stumble upon an elaborate scam to pull off a jewellery shop robbery. After the man and his girlfriend are arrested, Perkins uses the situation to Fletcher's advantage in an attempt to prove his innocence. Meanwhile, Nadir's father is arrested for burglary. Things get worse for the DC when his mother discovers he is in a relationship with drug dealer Kristen Shaw.
85	"Smell the Roses"	Gary Webster, Josef Altin and Silas Carson guest star	Delyth Thomas	Andrew Alty	6 December 2006	462
Meadows isn't impressed with Nadir's lack of progress on the undercover operation, so decides to set up a sting to catch Haskew and Alvarez red handed during a major drug deal. While Nadir tries to keep Shaw out of the limelight, SOCA wade into the picture and force Meadows to abort the planned raid, having uncovered information that Haskew and Alvarez are about to shake on a £6 million trafficking deal. Meanwhile, Casper and Valentine attend to a young boy who is found chained up in handcuffs. Their investigation leads them to a group of rowdy teenagers in the middle of a housewarming party, where they find an intoxicated girl unconscious in the neighbour's garden pond.
86	"Make No Apologies"	Gary Webster, Josef Altin and Silas Carson guest star	Delyth Thomas	Scott Cherry	7 December 2006	463
As SOCA prepare to intercept the Colombian drugs shipment, Meadows and Hunter attempt to restart their campaign to bring down Kristen Shaw by arresting a petty dealer, who offers up information on Shaw's network of dealers and suppliers. Nadir finds his loyalties torn between Shaw and the job, and finally steps firmly over the line when he offers up false information to Meadows regarding the planned date for the trafficking deal. Meanwhile, Gold and Valentine are ordered back to the home of the lottery winning Henderson family when a domestic dispute breaks out between the mother and her estranged husband, but things escalate when she accuses him of kidnapping his youngest child.
87	"Recover the Op (Part 1)"	Return of DC Jo Masters; Philip Martin Brown and Francis Magee guest star	Nigel Douglas	Maxwell Young	19 December 2006	464
Turner and Perkins find themselves in awkward position when one of the suspects arrested in a raid on a counterfeit car parts business turns out to be none other than former Sun Hill DC Jo Masters, who has been working undercover for Nottingham CID at a haulage firm involved in gun-running, alongside her long-time informant, Seth Mercer. Although initially reluctant to cooperate, Masters eventually agrees to let her former colleagues provide back-up for a planned meet between rival dealers Dougie Clark and Phillip Hanson, but the deal goes awry when Hanson recognises Mercer from his days as a supergrass. Meanwhile, Harman and Kapoor break-up a fight between relatives at a funeral.
88	"Hunted (Part 2)"	Philip Martin Brown guest stars	Nigel Douglas	Maxwell Young	20 December 2006	465
Masters frantically begins the search for Seth Mercer, who has been abducted at gunpoint by arms dealer Phillip Hanson. A search of one of Hanson's warehouses uncovers evidence that someone has been seriously injured, but when she and Perkins find Hanson's car, they unexpectedly discover Hanson's mutilated body in the boot. Mercer soon becomes a prime suspect for murder, but with both the police and the man who put a price on his head trailing, it boils down to which of them will find him first. Meanwhile, uniform attend a mass eviction of council tenants from the Aldbourne Estate, and deal with an allegation of assault when a pregnant woman claims that one of the bailiffs attacked her.
89	"With Good Grace"	—	Adrian Vitoria	Sally Tatchell	21 December 2006	466
Christmas Special. Sun Hill faces a busy Christmas shift as Harman and Noble investigate an assault on one of Noble's former army colleagues. Plagued by a former grudge, Noble's opinion of the victim clouds her judgement when she begins searching for a motive for the attack, but soon realises that the most likely suspect may be in fact be the man's wife. Meanwhile, Webb and Walker investigate an arson attack on a flat set for demolition on the Aldbourne estate, but have to contend with an action rights protester. When she steals a digger belonging to the contractor, she tries to claim the developers torched the flat to force the tenants out, until evidence points at the victims themselves.
90	"Foxtrap"	—	Adrian Vitoria	Chris Smyth	27 December 2006	467
Smith and Noble investigate when a 16-year-old girl reportedly disappears from home after having a sleepover at her friend's house. However, they soon discover that the girl is safe and well and has been staying with secret boyfriend. When the girl's father finds out, he provides Turner and Walker with information into an illegal marriage scam being run by the boy and his father. Meanwhile, Webb tries to distance himself from ex-prostitute Carrie Morgan after she is arrested for the alleged theft of a bracelet from her workplace. However, Webb soon discovers that one of her colleagues may have stolen the bracelet in an attempt to use it to blackmail her into having sex.
91	"Get on Your Bike"	Sgt Nikki Wright transfers to Sun Hill; first appearance of Sgt Doug Wright; Donald Sumpter and Alan Ford guest star	Laurence Moody	Neil Clarke	28 December 2006	470
Sergeant Nikki Wright joins Sun Hill and, as she did on her secondment to the station a few weeks earlier, investigates an armed robbery. Meanwhile, her husband Doug is seconded to Sun Hill when Valentine and Hollis find a missing boy's dead body, with Doug the FLO on the original missing person's case. Manson, who heads up the case, is assisted by James Tennant, a friend of the deceased boy's father. Rod Jessop stuns Ackland with a proposal, while Gold is horrified when Heaton reveals that Sun Hill could close as part of a merge with Barton Street.

=== Unaired episodes ===
#	Title	Episode notes	Directed by	Written by	Original air date	Prod #
91	"Dereliction of Duty"	—	Robert Gabriel	Stuart Morris	Unaired	468
The mastertape of this episode was stolen during a robbery at the programme's recording studios in September 2006. Filming schedules did not allow for the episode to re-record in time for broadcast. This episode would later be re-written and broadcast during Series 23 under the title of "Blood Money". The original synopsis for the episode was as follows: Part One. Nixon and Noble investigate when a young woman is thrown from a walkway on the Cole Lane Estate, which subsequently leads her husband to try to take his own life. When Smith and Noble attend a disturbance at the woman's flat the next day, they discover that she has disappeared without trace. Meanwhile, an assault being investigated by Webb leads Perkins, Stamp and Casper to go undercover. The initial recording would not have featured Sgt Nikki Wright as she joined Sun Hill two episodes after the original air date, while Sam Nixon would've been a DS in this episode after promotion to DI in early 2007.
92	"Harmony"	—	Robert Gabriel	Stuart Morris	Unaired	469
The mastertape of this episode was stolen during a robbery at the programme's recording studios in September 2006. Filming schedules did not allow for the episode to re-record in time for broadcast. This episode would later be re-written and broadcast during Series 23 under the title of "To Honour and Obey". The original synopsis for the episode was as follows: Part Two. Nixon and Meadows investigate when the body of Reshna Dewan is hauled from the Thames, and new evidence suggests that her extra-marital affairs may have had a part to play in her death. Meanwhile, Noble and Webb question the eccentric victim of an alleged mugging, who claims to be an undercover police officer, but Scotland Yard refuse to confirm or deny whether or not she is telling the truth. The initial recording would not have featured Sergeant Nikki Wright as she joined the show in the episode after the original air date, while Sam Nixon would’ve appeared as a DS in this episode after promotion to DI in early 2007.
