= The Bill series 23 =

The Bill
- Series 23
- Series 23 DVD cover
- No. of episodes: 92

Release
- Original network: ITV
- Original release: 3 January – 28 December 2007

Series chronology
- ← Previous; Series 22 Next → Series 24

Series 23 of British television drama The Bill was broadcast from 3 January until 28 December 2007. The series consists of 92 episodes.

== DVD release ==
On 2 April 2014, the complete series was released on DVD in Australia as a Region 0, playable anywhere in the world. Several episodes were aired out of production order, such as the conclusion of the Zain Nadir plot (which was brought forward owing to demand from the viewers), and so, to avoid confusion, some episodes were renumbered. However, the DVD release carries the episodes in broadcast order, rather than production order, meaning that the DVD synopsis printed on the sleeve is heavily incorrect. The DVD synopsis also removes all titles (including those carried on screen), and continues to tally the episodes by number. The DVD release does not contain episodes 540–542, "Moving Target" Parts 1–3, owing to licensing rights for these episodes not being available.

== Image overhaul ==
The series saw a new title sequence introduced in the first episode, with the theme tune slightly rearranged (although the previous version returned a handful of times during the series), with images of procedural work and the inside of the station updated compared to the previous sequence, while the end title had its blue shade lightened before it was replaced later in the year by an interior shot of the Area Car driving through London. The show would also introduce on-screen episode titles for the first time since 2002 from Episode 20 onwards. Renovations continued on the station set that began in 2006 to add a modern look; the final touches in 2007 saw the front end redesigned to separate it from the St Hugh's hospital set, while metal fencing was added around the front yard.

== Plot ==
Series 23 saw the return of several multi-part story arcs, the likes of which had last featured in the second half of Series 17. The series was similar to the late 90s and early 2000s where the police drama and character focus were balanced; however, more individual episodes were emerging than had been the case in the previous series.

The show concluded several arcs from 2006 in the first few months including the disappearance of schoolgirl Amy Tennant and DC Zain Nadir's work undercover in a drugs ring, which culminated in his exit alongside PC Honey Harman, who was killed after four years when Zain's girlfriend and drugs baron Kristen Shaw shot her dead in a struggle, Zain jailed for hiding Honey's body. The other big plot was Sergeant June Ackland's romance with school headmaster Rod Jessop, retiring as part of the exit plot for the show's longest-running cast member to date, Trudie Goodwin, leaving the role of Ackland after 23 years on 8 March 2007. Her exit scenes coincided with three guest appearances by former series regular Jim Carver, who made a brief return two years after his original exit, having been the co-protagonist with Goodwin in the series pilot in 1983. This was also the last episode not to feature an on-screen title.

The series also featured a plot on honour killing, with the episode it was featured in, To Honour and Obey, being broadcast out of order after its mastertape was stolen in November 2006 along with the one for the previous episode, Blood Money; the episodes were originally due to air in December 2006. Other plots included Superintendent John Heaton being targeted by both a rampaging gunman and a former colleague turned villain, Ray Moore (portrayed by Mark Bonnar).

== Cast changes ==
In addition to pilot star June Ackland's retirement, the series lost one of its most notable stars in Scott Maslen as the DS Phil Hunter actor was poached by BBC soap EastEnders, ending a run of five years in the role as he transferred to a specialist squad at New Scotland Yard. Aml Ameen also left at the end of his 18-month contract as his character PC Lewis Hardy joined Operation Trident after going undercover to save his cousin from a street gang, getting shot in the process but surviving. Several recurring characters such as press officer Mia Perry, CPS lawyer Matt Hinckley and DAC Georgia Hobbs also exited the series as focus moved to the core cast of coppers, while some introduced by previous exec Paul Marquess were axed such as PCs Dan Casper and Leela Kapoor. In addition to Honey Harman's fatal shooting exit in January, the show killed off newcomer PC Billy Rowan in his first episode as part of a 3-part plot that saw the police targeted by a rampaging knifeman who also wounded another officer. London's Burning actor Sam Callis replaced Ackland as brutish Sergeant Callum Stone, while his Ultimate Force co-star Christopher Fox replaced Hunter as DS Max Carter. Other characters introduced included Ben Richards from Footballers' Wives as PC Nate Roberts and Ali Bastian from Hollyoaks as PC Sally Armstrong.

== Arrivals ==
- PC Beth Green ("Baby Trade"–)
- DC Grace Dasari ("Better Off Dead"–)
- PC Sally Armstrong ("Cop Killer, Part One"–)
- PC Billy Rowan ("Cop Killer, Part One"–)
- Sgt Callum Stone ("Good Cop, Bad Cop"–)
- PC Benjamin Gayle ("Cracking Under Pressure"–)
- PC Nate Roberts ("Collateral Damage"–)
- DS Max Carter ("Assault on Sun Hill, Part One"–)

== Departures ==
- PC Honey Harman – Shot dead by drugs baron Kristen Shaw
- DC Zain Nadir – Sent to prison for his part in PC Honey Harman's murder
- DAC Georgia Hobbs – Exposed as part of a corruption scandal involving council officials
- Sgt June Ackland – Retires and leaves with fiancé Rod Jessop
- CPS Lawyer Matt Hinckley – Dismissed after being charged with abusing his former lover and wife
- DOPA Mia Perry – Changes station after the love triangle involving her, Supt John Heaton and DC Mickey Webb
- PC Billy Rowan – Murdered during his first day on duty
- PC Lewis Hardy – Transfers to Operation Trident
- PC Dan Casper – Leaves the force to take a security job in Ibiza
- PC Leela Kapoor – Transfers to the Foreign and Commonwealth Office
- DS Phil Hunter – Transfers to Specialist Crime at New Scotland Yard

== Episodes ==
#	Title	Episode Notes	Directed by	Written by	Original air date	Prod #
1	"Games of War"	New title sequence and theme introduced	Laurence Moody	Chris Smyth	3 January 2007	471
Manson investigates when grieving father Rick Harris appears to abduct a young boy from outside a local medical centre, unaware that the boy is a diabetic and must have regular medication to ensure his blood sugar levels remain the same. With the help of James Tennant, Manson manages to track Rick down to a houseboat, which he used to live on, but soon discovers that the boy is nowhere in sight. Meanwhile, Ackland investigates when the youngest of the lottery-winning Henderson family, Kyle, begins a campaign of harassment against her partner, headteacher Rod Jessop. Events take a dramatic turn when Rod and Kyle are hospitalised in separate incidents.
2	"'Till Hell Freezes Over"	Josef Altin guest stars	Alan Macmillan	Simon Moss	4 January 2007	472
The CID begins the investigation into the arson attack on the home of the lottery-winning family, the Hendersons. Manson discovers that the fire started in an identical way to two previous fires investigated by Nixon and Turner, at a foster home and a B&B. Warren Pritchard, the man jailed for the previous two fires, is rearrested after the team discovers he was bailed at trial. Further digging clears him, not only of the Henderson fire, but the previous two, leaving CID back at square one. In uniform, Smithy leads the troops on a search for the car involved in Rod Jessop's hit and run, and it's not long before CCTV footage puts truant Kyle Henderson in the frame for the attack. However, with his brother watching his every move, Stamp and Hollis try to trip up a friend of Kyle's into exposing the truant's involvement. Meanwhile, Meadows and Heaton interview candidates for the new DI post, but Meadows tries to persuade Nixon to apply.
3	"The New Generation"	Temporary departure of PC Leela Kapoor; Josef Altin, Karen Henthorn and Victoria Alcock guest star	Alan Macmillan	Mark Johnson	10 January 2007	473
Nixon and Turner's quest to discover the identity of the serial arsonist takes an interesting turn when they discover that Jay Henderson's ex-girlfriend, Cheryl Wilkes, who claims to be pregnant with his baby, has links to all three of the locations where fires took place – the first being her childhood home, and the second being a foster home where she was placed while she was in care. Elsewhere, Smith and Walker investigate after a seemingly minor spat between a market trader and a customer leads to an assault on the customer's heavily pregnant wife, but would the market trader go so far as to attack her in retaliation? Smithy asks Walker if she wants to move in after struggling to find a place to live, while Nixon tells Turner and Hunter she'll be the new DI.
4	"Two-Time Loser"	First appearance of Nurse Tash Niles; Peter Guinness, Emma Stansfield and Jessica Harris guest star	Richard Signy	Malcolm Campbell	11 January 2007	474
Gold and Valentine find a parole officer assaulted and locked in the boot of his car, but the victim may just be a suspect in another crime when his assailant claims he raped his incarcerated wife. Nixon and Masters discover he has been offering sex in exchange for parole, but their investigation takes a dark turn when one of the prisoners attempts suicide. Meanwhile, Hardy witnesses a mugging on his way into work, but discovers that the alleged victim may be heading up a scam exchanging cash for passing marks on the British Citizenship test. After getting injured twice, Hardy takes a shine to St Hugh's nurse Tash Niles, who later suggests he should move in with her after the departure of his grandmother to Jamaica.
5	"An Article of Faith"	—	Richard Signy	Richard Ommanney	17 January 2007	475
Panic and speculation swirl around Sun Hill as Heaton reveals the station may be about to close. Hobbs is left furious at the discovery, but Heaton insists the team needed to know before a press leak; Gold, who was notified ahead of time, suspects the super may know more than he's letting on. The suicide of a young mother leads to a loansharking ring targeting vulnerable mothers, so Harman is sent in undercover as a single mother, accompanied by Wright's young nephew. An arrest leads to a sting to catch the kingpin behind the loansharking, but Webb is furious when the deceased mother's ex wades in and blows the OBBO, leaving Heaton to intervene in an attempt to force a confession. Elsewhere, Valentine helps an old friend when his pub is allegedly raided by a man in a chicken outfit, but Roger is disappointed to discover the culprit may be closer to home.
6	"A Week from Next Tuesday"	Gary Webster, Silas Carson and Justin Pickett guest star	Reza Moradi	Chris Murray	18 January 2007	476
Nadir gets two shocks on his return from holidays as Paul Haskew decides he doesn't need him onside, while SOCA stun him by revealing they know the Colombian deal is happening a month ahead of the time he told them. Using it to his advantage, he gets back in by relaying the info to Haskew, suggesting giving a dummy location for the drop, but his plan could be compromised when he tells barman Chez Williams that he was undercover when Chez introduced him to Kristen Shaw. Furious, Chez refuses to follow Nadir's request – can he persuade him he is bent now when he wasn't before? Elsewhere in the Alvarez case, Harman is assigned to a safehouse with the drugs mule Eva Garcia, but her relationship hits the rocks when she suggests taking a holiday with a reluctant Fletcher. In CID, Hunter and Turner clash yet again over the suspects in a hammer attack. Turner believes an ex-con is involved, but Hunter believes the woman's son is responsible. When Turner's suspect confesses, he thinks he has the upper hand, but could Hunter's suspect be guilty of more than lying about his lavish lifestyle?
7	"Lead on a Merry Chase"	Gary Webster and Silas Carson guest star	Reza Moradi	Tom Higgins	24 January 2007	477
The Alvarez case takes a sinister turn when Eva Garcia's brother turns up at the safehouse. Nadir persists in trying to talk Shaw out of the drug deal, but she refuses. When Garcia's brother is severely beaten while confronting Alvarez, the sting looks compromised, with Eva doing a runner from the safehouse after locking Harman in a room. Leaving for her holiday in Tenerife, Harman clashes with Fletcher when he decides not to come, but her journey home throws her right back into work when she finds Eva roaming the streets. Her attempts to lull her back to Sun Hill lead to both women being abducted, and a call from Haskew demanding Nadir at Bar Morocco quickly follows; has he been rumbled? Meanwhile, Perkins investigates a string of robberies involving lone businessmen staying at private hotels, and Hardy finds himself reprimanded by Wright for being heavily hungover at work.
8	"School of Hard Knocks"	Final appearance of PC Honey Harman; Gary Webster and Silas Carson guest star	Diana Patrick	Tom Needham	25 January 2007	478
With a gun to Harman and another on him, Nadir is forced to admit he is undercover. As Haskew, Shaw, and Nadir dispute on whether or not Nadir is actually bent, Alvarez silences the room by shooting informant Eva Garcia. As Haskew drags Harman and Nadir to the drug deal, Nadir explains all to Harman, leaving her disgusted. With SOCA at the wrong location, the lorry is intercepted with it continuing in the wrong direction, but it is a bust. Nadir proves to Alvarez that the police are going to the wrong place to regain his trust, but he loses Haskew's trust when he tries to shoot him in an attempt to stop Haskew from killing Harman. A heart-to-heart between Nadir and Shaw sees them decide to elope with the cash, but not before CO19 storms the deal and engages in a firefight. As bullets fly and bodies drop, the Sun Hill team is left looking for their own among the casualties.
9	"Burn Off"	—	Diana Patrick	Steve Griffiths	31 January 2007	479
Nadir awakes from a living nightmare to discover Haskew was killed in the firefight and Alvarez is in custody. He returns home to discover Shaw made it out of the bust in one piece, but both break down over the death of Harman. With Alvarez keeping quiet, Nadir thinks they're in the clear; Shaw subsequently plants a lookalike on Harman's flight to Tenerife to cover their tracks. But when Eva Garcia's body is pulled out of the canal, Alvarez hints at what Nadir has done, and a comment about betrayal makes Heaton and Meadows send Nadir to a safehouse. Meanwhile, Keane and Hardy investigate a burglary and discover that the homeowners were gassed with Nitrous Oxide before being ransacked. Their prime suspect is their former nanny, fired for having an affair with the husband, but his constant arguing with his wife impedes Keane and Hardy's attempts to get to the bottom of the case.
10	"Dead Man's Hand"	Final regular appearance of DC Zain Nadir; final appearance of Kristen Shaw; Lin Blakley, Harry Towb and Justin Pickett guest star	Paul Wroblewski	Sarah Louise-Hawkins	1 February 2007	484
11	"Dead Man's Hand"	Final regular appearance of DC Zain Nadir; final appearance of Kristen Shaw; Lin Blakley, Harry Towb and Justin Pickett guest star	Paul Wroblewski	Sarah Louise-Hawkins	7 February 2007	485
Part One: Nadir comes back to work in a relieved state after Meadows all but admits defeat in their search for Kristen Shaw. However, he is brought back to earth with a bump when Gold reports Harman missing to Meadows, with her last phone call coming on the day Eva Garcia disappeared. And, when the team discovers the woman who boarded her flight to be an impostor, a search is duly organised. With phone signals pinging at Bonham Wharf, Nadir panics that he is about to be caught and, after tracking down Shaw, they plan to flee, but his behaviour starts to arouse Meadows and Hunter's suspicions. Meanwhile, Keane and Hardy find a heavily pregnant female at the bottom of a flight of stairs after an apparent burglary, but it appears her partner may be implicated when it is revealed her stolen watch was originally stolen in another burglary, involving Heaton's estranged wife Rhiannon. Part Two: With Harman's body found and Nadir in custody, MIT swoops in to investigate. Meadows tries to think the best of Nadir and allows him to go home and get changed, but lives to regret it when Nadir slips surveillance, just as DNA proves he was at the scene. He heads off to meet Shaw, but begins to change his mind when he discovers Shaw still has the gun that killed Harman. With MIT and CID trying to track down the runaway lovers, Zain is left battling his conscience. Fletcher struggles to cope when Harman's mother asks to see him, finally accepting that he took her for granted. Elsewhere, Keane's emotions over Harman and another fight with Matt see her lose her cool with a pair of bickering sisters when their father has an angina attack, caused by their fight over a missing family heirloom.
12	"The Good Old Days"	Leslie Grantham and Julie Peasgood guest star	Olivia Lichtenstein	Andrew Taft	8 February 2007	480
Ackland and fiancée Rod Jessop work together when Valentine and Casper find a pupil from Harvey Wallace school, Martin Clarke, with stab wounds. Noble is frustrated when Hollis' stomach ache keeps him indoors, looking at CCTV into the theft of bandages. Meanwhile, Gold and Smith attempt to locate a missing prisoner, Jimmy Collins. All three cases collide when it appears that Collins has a link to the prime stabbing suspect Tom Ryan, while Hollis spots Collins on CCTV stealing bandages. Ackland stuns Jessop by suggesting early retirement.
13	"Don't Cut No Ice"	Samantha Nixon is promoted to DI	Olivia Lichtenstein	Chris Smyth	15 February 2007	481
Ackland investigates a theft of copper piping from the Aldbourne Estate. With troubles escalating on the estate, she confronts a developer over a drug den in one of the empty flats. She later meets with resident Frank Harris, who is concerned about the legality over the redevelopment, but a fight with a local yob sees him hospitalised. Ackland decides to tell Gold, and later Stamp and Hollis, that she plans to take early retirement. Smith's disastrous birthday sees him bail a man for dangerous driving, only to realise after his release that he is not only using a fake name, but that he is driving a car stolen as part of a scam. His attempts to arrest him a second time lead to a shootout, but when he's tracked down, Smithy hatches a mischievous plan to get his own back. After disputing with Walker over his birthday, they agree to call time on their relationship.
14	"The Lone Wolf"	Final appearance of James Tennant; Tara Moran guest stars	Gill Wilkinson	Chris Ould	21 February 2007	482
15	"The Lone Wolf"	Final appearance of James Tennant; Tara Moran guest stars	Gill Wilkinson	Chris Ould	22 February 2007	483
Part One A family event to mark the one-year anniversary of Amy Tennant's disappearance is disrupted when her father, James, gets into a fight with Shelley Fitzgerald, Amy's late mum's best friend, who accuses him of killing her when she first disappeared. Her behaviour sufficiently arouses Manson's suspicions, and a raid on her late father's allotment leads to the discovery of a body, but it turns out to be her own daughter Clare, who died as a baby. Despite Manson's concerns over her mental health, she is bailed, only for Turner to find new evidence that blows the case wide open. Elsewhere, Turner and Walker investigate a case of bigamy involving a witness in the Tennant case, and Noble and Keane deal with a bizarre RTA involving a flock of stolen sheep. Part Two With Amy Tennant seen on CCTV with Shelley Fitzgerald, Manson breaks the news to her distraught dad James that she is alive and in Canley. Investigation determines that Shelley has been in France, and after arresting her boyfriend Felix, they try to use him to track her down. Feeling disillusioned over recent events, Keane's spirits lift when she makes a breakthrough that leads to Shelley, but her spirits are crushed once more by Matt. The trail leads the team to Brighton, where, accompanied by James, they begin the search for Shelley and Amy. After a year of searching, James lays eyes on his daughter at last, but her reaction to seeing him leaves him wondering if she'll accept him again.
16	"Blast From the Past"	Final appearance of DAC Georgia Hobbs; guest appearance of now-DS Jim Carver; Mike Reid and Phaldut Sharma guest star	Alan Grint	Chris Smyth and Julia Wall	28 February	486
17	"Blast From the Past"	Final appearance of DAC Georgia Hobbs; guest appearance of now-DS Jim Carver; Mike Reid and Phaldut Sharma guest star	Alan Grint	Chris Smyth and Julia Wall	1 March 2007	487
Part One – Sticky Fingers: Ackland's hopes of a quiet exit from Sun Hill are scuppered when Aldbourne Estate resident Frank Harris assaults property developer Brian Stevens. Ackland is sceptical when Harris accuses Stevens of corruption. An insider gives her evidence to suggest there is more to Frank's allegations than she expected. A series of high-level arrests leads to nowhere but a lecture from Hobbs to Heaton about arresting council official Jerry Davis. With all avenues covered, Ackland thinks she's found the vital evidence on CCTV, but she is rammed off the road while delivering it back to the station. Elsewhere, a woman arrested with stolen property is tied to a scam involving a man living above a travel agent's. Wright and Noble investigate how he gained access to the agent's data. Part Two – Within Striking Distance: Gold is stunned when Ackland reveals Hobbs and Heaton are having an affair. With Hobbs seen in an email offering the land below Sun Hill to crooked property developer Brian Stevens, Gold and Ackland take their suspicions to Heaton, but he shuts them down. Worried that Heaton will cover it up, Ackland grills Stevens when his son is arrested on suspicion of running Ackland off the road. Heaton reprimands her and orders her off the case. Back on the Aldbourne, a near-riot kicks off as they try to evict the final residents. With time running out, Heaton tries to trip Hobbs up over her relationship with Stevens to save the station.
18	"End of an Era"	Final appearances of Sgt June Ackland and Rod Jessop; guest appearance of DS Jim Carver	Alan Macmillan	Si Spencer and Maxwell Young	7 March 2007	488
19	"End of an Era"	Final appearances of Sgt June Ackland and Rod Jessop; guest appearance of DS Jim Carver	Alan Macmillan	Si Spencer and Maxwell Young	8 March 2007	489
Part One – The Party is Over: Jim Carver, now a DS with Greater Manchester Police, shows up at Sun Hill to track down drug dealer Pat Hadley, whom he has been trying to catch for eighteen months. Ackland is not best pleased to be spending her last day at Sun Hill with her ex-husband, but puts her qualms to one side as the pair investigates Hadley's right-hand man, Greg Burns. Burns provides info on a raid, but it goes belly up, leaving the pair in grave danger. Elsewhere, Hollis and Hardy investigate a decomposed skeleton found on railway lines and attempt to track down some stolen medals, leading Hardy to the home of his girlfriend's younger brother. Part Two – The Last Stop: Ackland's leaving do turns into a rescue mission after she and Carver are kidnapped by Greg Burns and Pat Hadley. The pair try to complete a drug deal that goes wrong, leaving one suspect dead, with the other collapsing in custody after claiming brutality during his arrest. With Ackland and Carver being held in a warehouse, old wounds are opened as they reminisce on their old relationship; he throws a spanner in the works by saying he still loves her, but will she go back to him should they escape Burns and Hadley's clutches?
20	"Sweet Revenge"	Episode titles start appearing on screen again; Michael Maloney guest stars	Robert Knights	Matthew Bardsley	21 March 2007	490
Nixon seizes the chance to put away a villain from her past after investigating the assault of his ex-wife, who is now running an adult webcam service. A check into her finances reveals she recently had £40,000 deposited in her bank account, which Nixon suspects is some of the proceeds from a securivan robbery seven years previously – but Hunter's impatience leads him to undertake an illegal search of a storage locker belonging to the suspect, where he finds the stolen cash. Meanwhile, Mickey undertakes PR work with the local Neighbourhood Watch group on the Jasmine Allen Estate, but soon finds himself investigating a hit-and-run incident involving the leader of the group.
21	"Killer on The Run"	Michael Maloney, Cheryl Hall, Vilma Hollingbery and Kate Lonergan guest star	Robert Knights	Chris Murray	22 March 2007	491
Smithy deals with a routine traffic stop which turns out to be anything but when he finds the battered corpse of the driver's wife in the boot. As suspect Ryan Jones manages to elude Valentine and Noble by escaping onto the underground network, armed with a gun, the team begin to build up a picture of their target, only to discover that neither his friends nor family really know what he is like. When Smith and Gold manage to corner him in a nearby park, he opens fire and shoots two innocent bystanders. However, it soon becomes clear that his personal vendetta is against Smithy – and that further targets are on the cards – beginning with Smithy's mother, Pauline, whom he attacks at gunpoint.
22	"Dead Men Don't Tell Lies"	Mark Bonnar guest stars	Kim Flitcroft	Len Collin	28 March 2007	492
Turner and Webb investigate an arson attack on the home of an alcoholic, which resulted in his death – but when Turner interviews a possible witness, Heaton is furious to learn that it is none other than psychopathic gangster and former colleague Ray Moore – an ex-copper turned villain who has plagued his career ever since leaving the force. However, a post-mortem examination reveals that the deceased is not the man Turner and Webb first thought. Meanwhile, youngster Jimmy Cunningham is in court to testify against a local thug, Vince Haughton, who violently assaulted a local businessman, leaving him unable to walk. However, when Jimmy absconds, it's Stamp and Hollis' job to track him down.
23	"Brotherhood"	Mark Bonnar guest stars	Kim Flitcroft	Hilary Frankland	29 March 2007	493
Masters and Hunter investigate the stabbing of a member of the Skens, and Hardy's joy at reuniting with cousin Dominic is quickly extinguished when he discovers Dominic may be involved. Heaton's pursuit of Ray Moore continues when an associate, Paddy Morgan, is shot. Morgan flees the scene and is pursued by Noble and Fletcher; during the pursuit, a young boy is knocked off his bike, and later dies of his injuries in hospital. When Morgan is arrested, he refuses to cooperate and is bailed. CCTV outside the station shows Morgan being confronted by two men, leaving Heaton fearing Moore will have Morgan killed.
24	"Daddy's Girl"	Peter Guinness, Mark Bonnar and Megan Jossa guest star	Laurence Moody	Chris Dunn	4 April 2007	494
Noble and Keane answer a distress call to the home of Ray Moore's neighbour and find Moore's ten-year-old daughter, Annie, threatening a youth with a gun. Heaton suspects that hit-and-run driver Paddy Morgan may have been killed by Moore himself – and that his daughter may have been witness to his death. However, with no body and the only piece of usable evidence corrupted during the earlier armed stand-off, Moore threatens to evade capture again. Meanwhile, Noble and Keane deal with the theft of Annie's bike and criminal damage to a clothes mart – all the hallmarks of an initiation to a long-forgotten local youth cult known as the 'Canley Club', who appear to have resurfaced.
25	"End of the Affair"	Peter Guinness guest stars	Lawrence Moody	Doug Milburn	11 April 2007	495
Gold finds herself caught in an awkward situation when Peter Harris' wife, Mary, turns up at the station with a ransom note, claiming that Peter has been kidnapped. Forced to reveal her night of passion to Manson, suspicion immediately falls on another of Peter's lovers, who arrives at the scene of the planned drop to collect the ransom money. However, Manson soon realises that the team has been duped, and it's not long before Gold realises who the kidnapper really is. Meanwhile, a youth is badly assaulted on the Larkmead estate, and with a little help from Niles’ brother, Hardy and Valentine investigate a local youth club owner who they suspect may be responsible for dealing drugs.
26	"Exit Wound"	Peter Guinness and Simon Merrells guest star	Robert Del Maestro	Scott Cherry	18 April 2007	496
Perkins and Masters investigate when a man is found badly beaten in some local woodland, but uncover a strong lead straight from the off when it appears that the perpetrator later made the 999 call which led officers to the man's location. They discover the victim is an employee of a security firm who has details of a planned delivery of rare and valuable antiques. Meanwhile, Gold, Casper, and Hollis investigate a charity scam after one of the donors suffers a heart attack during a botched burglary. However, when they discover that a broken window disguised as the point of entry was broken from inside the property, they realise that they may have already found their suspect.
27	"Pride Before a Fall"	Kirsty Mitchell and Tristan Sturrock guest star	Robert Del Maestro	Nicholas McInerny	19 April 2007	497
Turner plays a practical joke on Hunter that ruins his investigation into a robbery at a nail bar. When Meadows comes across the pair fighting in CID, he jumps to the conclusion that Hunter is the guilty party, and would learn more respect for the job by having a spell in uniform. Valentine is left unimpressed when Hardy ropes him into laborious paperwork to get some background on the mysterious skull Niles’ brother Rudy discovered a few weeks ago, but his hard work discovers a link to an ex-soldier who disappeared after being involved in the Balkans conflict, only to realise their missing man may be a murder suspect.
28	"Hunter on the Street"	Return of PC Leela Kapoor, DS Phil Hunter is seconded to uniform; Richard Hawley guest stars	Christopher King	Chris Murray	25 April 2007	498
Hunter squeezes back into uniform and teams up with Kapoor to investigate an Asian girl accused of robbing a shop. However, the victim's racial opinions on the suspect leave Kapoor suspecting all is not as it seems. Heaton and Meadows spearhead the search for a violent prisoner who has escaped, seven years into a murder charge. Perry and Webb clash over whether to publicise the criminal's identity, but despite early reluctance, a savage assault on a local businessman changes Heaton's mind. Perry is crushed when, after a vigilante attack on the wrong man, Webb cannot resist telling her he was right about his opinion not to go public. With evidence to suggest the brother of the assaulted businessman could be responsible for the original murder seven years ago, Heaton appeals to the escaped prisoner in an attempt to draw him into the open and clear his name.
29	"Role Model"	—	Christopher King	Tom Higgins	26 April 2007	499
Fletcher and Casper arrest a member of a gang of steamers who have been carrying out a number of audacious daylight robberies. The boy's young brother is implicated as well, and ends up providing Webb with the information to catch his brother; an undercover operation is set up, but goes wrong when Keane gets stabbed in the arm. One of the gang's victims is revealed as an old friend of Hinckley’s, who drops a bombshell on Fletcher that could be key to exposing Hinckley. Meanwhile, Josh Carey, witness to an assault the day before, makes a startling confession to Wright, and his behaviour gives her cause for concern. Perry is awkward with Heaton following the previous night's encounter, and Webb guesses she has been unfaithful; will he work out who she has cheated with?
30	"And Nothing But The Truth"	Michael Elwyn guest stars	Reza Moradi	Frank Rickarby	2 May 2007	500
Webb distracts himself from Perry's apparent cheating by investigating a drowning death in the pool at a High Court judge's home. When he comes face to face with Perry, he finds out Heaton was her other man, leading Webb to thump the Superintendent for his indiscretions. When he goes to resign, Webb is stopped in his tracks by Meadows, who gives Heaton a reality check. When Webb clashes with Heaton over a complaint from the judge under investigation, Meadows wonders if the pair can work together professionally again. Elsewhere, Fletcher reveals to Keane his discovery that Hinckley’s supposedly dead ex-girlfriend Nina Lloyd is alive, and after coming face with her, Keane confronts Hinckley, with disastrous results.
31	"Day of Reckoning"	Final appearance of SCP Matt Hinckley; Ortis Deley and Clare Perkins guest star	Reza Moradi	Simon Moss	3 May 2007	501
Heaton briefs Gold and Masters on the alleged events the night before at Emma and Matt Hinckley's home. Fletcher is horrified to learn Matt is pressing for a charge of attempted murder against his wife, and sets out to expose the control freak's vicious bullying tendencies with help from former girlfriend Nina Lloyd. Meanwhile, Manson organises a raid on a crack house, with Hardy determined to track down the dealer when he escapes. Enlisting the help of the dealer's young runner, things go awry when the boy's mother interferes in the case and is put in danger as a result. Meanwhile, Casper takes pity on a drug addict who takes him hostage during the raid, only for the girl to let him down by falling back into drugs.
32	"Family Honour"	Rebroadcast from Series 22 owing to master-tape theft in November 2006; Shelley King, Simon Slater and Jenny Eclair guest star	Robert Gabriel	Stuart Morris	9 May 2007	468R
33	"Family Honour"	Rebroadcast from Series 22 owing to master-tape theft in November 2006; Shelley King, Simon Slater and Jenny Eclair guest star	Robert Gabriel	Stuart Morris	10 May 2007	469R
Part One – Blood Money: Nixon, Wright, and Noble deal with a young woman who was pushed from a walkway on the Cole Lane Estate, and are then called to deal with the attempted suicide of the woman's husband. Further digging reveals the man to be in debt to a known criminal; a sting is set up to trap him, but it goes wrong, resulting in an armed standoff. Wright and Noble are called to a disturbance at the woman's flat the next day, but she has disappeared without a trace. Meanwhile, Webb deals with an assault, which leads Perkins, Stamp, and Casper to go undercover to trap a confidence trickster. Part Two – To Honour and Obey: After the discovery of Reshna Dewan's body, Nixon and Meadows wait for the forensic report, which reveals was strangled before being left in the Thames. The investigation reveals she had been having an affair with another man, which leads the team to realise that her in-laws may have been responsible, though which one of them proves harder to find out. Meanwhile, Noble and Webb's questioning of an alleged mugging victim, Maggie Carpenter, leaves them confused as she throws up several stories that don't check out.
34	"Baby Trade"	First appearance of PC Beth Green	David Innes Edwards	Stuart Morris	16 May 2007	502
Keane is feeling raw after her marital difficulties boiled over into violence and shows her tough side to new recruit Beth Green, as they investigate a woman's claim that her baby has been stolen. Perkins and Masters lead the search for the missing baby. Meadows is anxious to prove he's a worthy DCI and agrees to go undercover with Nixon to get a lead on the illegal baby-selling business, but his mistake puts his colleague in danger.
35	"Lies That Kill"	Elizabeth Rider and Mary Healey guest star	David Innes Edwards	Nicholas Martin	17 May 2007	503
Fletcher and Wright attend a disturbance at a family court where a father, Paul Conway, threatens to kill a social worker after punching her in the face. Events then spiral when the social worker is found dead after falling from the roof of a tower block on the Cheetham Estate. When Meadows and Nixon investigate, they discover that Conway lives in the tower where the victim fell, and he is arrested; while intoxicated, he confesses to murder. When he retracts this during interview and claims she jumped, despite CCTV footage of them arguing on the roof, Meadows and Nixon investigate the social worker's past to see if she was depressed enough to commit suicide. Elsewhere, new recruit Green delivers her first caution following an affray between a car salesman and a woman protesting against the dangers of 4x4 vehicles. When a TV is thrown through the cafe owned by the woman, she claims the salesman is responsible, but Casper isn't convinced all is as it seems.
36	"Inner Demons"	First appearance of Crime Scene Examiner Lorna Hart; Richard Standing guest stars	Simon Massey	Carolyn Sally Jones	24 May 2007	504
Wright again crosses paths with self-confessed paedophile Josh Carey when he tries to jump off a balcony inside the factory where he works. When he states he has been invited to join a child pornography ring, Wright enlists Perkins to help Carey fight his demons and nail the ringleaders. Manson takes charge of the investigation and launches an undercover operation with Perkins posing as Carey. Meanwhile, Hollis and Hunter are called to a funeral home where a valuable necklace has been taken from a corpse in a sealed coffin.
37	"Getting Away With Murder"	Opening title sequence tweaked; Mark Bonnar guest stars	Simon Massey	Mark Johnson	31 May 2007	505
Hunter's spell in uniform comes to a triumphant end when he borrows a bike to chase a mugger and recovers £15,000 in cash. The case gets more interesting when the victim admits he is being blackmailed. Heaton reassures terrified prosecution witness Martin Turnbull he will be given protection following threats from Ray Moore, only to discover the villainous ex-cop has subtler ways of intimidating people when Keane and Hollis attend the scene of a road traffic accident.
38	"Trigger Happy"	Temporary departure of DS Phil Hunter; Mark Bonnar and Ian Burfield guest star	Karl Neilson	Richard Ommanney	6 June 2007	506
Gang member Wesley Meeks is shot, and Niles witnesses his dying words: the name of corrupt ex-policeman Ray Moore. Heaton struggles to find evidence linking the victim with his arch enemy, but Hardy's cousin Dominic reveals the red scorpion tag sprayed on all of Moore's properties was Wesley's handiwork. Hunter's first day back in plain clothes gets off to a bad start, after he and Turner interview a young joyrider, and follow up on a report that he plans to take part in an armed robbery. Manson tells the warring DSs about a temporary switch with a Specialist Crime Directorate, and Hunter can't help but gloat when he gets the secondment.
39	"Do or Die"	Mark Bonnar guest stars	Karl Neilson	Neil Clarke	7 June 2007	507
Niles is attacked in the hospital car park, raising the terrifying prospect that Ray Moore is targeting people who could testify against him. Noble encounters a pensioner who turns out to be a fan of Reg's podcast Regflections, and who clearly has other guilty secrets to hide – including what appears to be a series of robberies from the homes of other pensioners. Heaton directs a search for further evidence into Ray Moore's activities.
40	"On the Edge"	Suzanne Shaw and Mark Bonnar guest star	Robert Knights	Steve Griffiths	13 June 2007	508
Following the shooting of her young brother Rudy, Niles agrees when Hardy tells her she now has more incentive to bring down Ray Moore. However, when Rudy's condition deteriorates to the point where he isn't expected to survive the next 24 hours, Hardy takes matters into his own hands, unaware that the case against Moore is rapidly getting stronger. Meanwhile, Green, Casper, Fletcher, and Noble attend a suspicious high-impact RTC. When Green notes the driver wouldn't have been tall enough to be driving, she suspects the woman's boyfriend or husband could be responsible.
41	"Better Off Dead"	First appearance of DC Grace Dasari; final appearances of DOPA Mia Perry and Nurse Tash Niles; Caroline Paterson guest stars	Robert Knights	Emma Goodwin	14 June 2007	509
After finally getting evidence to nail Ray Moore for the murder of Wesley Meeks and attempted murder of Rudy Niles, Heaton is devastated by the discovery of Moore's body at the bottom of a multi storey car park, with the team stunned when Hardy's prints are later found on a gun at the scene. After visiting the killers and his girlfriend, Niles, seeing her agonise ahead of Rudy's expected death leads Hardy to return to Sun Hill, where he confesses to his crime. However, when the killers are found after fatally overdosing, Heaton decides not to arrest Hardy for his role in Moore's death. Meanwhile, DC Grace Dasari, seconded from specialist crimes as part of the job swap with Hunter, teams up with Webb to help a woman trace her son, who has been missing for eleven years. Heaton ends his affair with Perry after his estranged wife Rhiannon decides to give him a second chance.
42	"Old Wounds"	Georgina Bouzova, Nick Brimble, Julia Deakin and Brian Croucher guest star	Jan Baeur	Julian Perkins	20 June 2007	510
Fletcher and Casper attend to a woman who claims to have been raped – but her plight prompts Meadows to reopen a cold case from twenty years previously, with help from an old colleague, DCI Roy Atherton. Keane reveals a maverick streak and puts her career on the line to help a reformed drug addict stay out of jail. Green and Valentine call to enforce an injunction in a domestic dispute and uncover a case of credit card cloning.
43	"Judgement Call"	—	Jan Baeur	Steve Attridge	21 June 2007	511
Sleeplessness and a taxing workload catch up with Meadows, who is lucky to escape from a road accident so bizarre his colleagues begin to suspect he is losing the plot. Webb sets out to rescue his boss's reputation and save his career. An explosion in a lock-up on an industrial estate alerts Manson to possible terrorist activity, and the owner's father-in-law makes a startling confession, but is he telling the truth? Turner and Dasari investigate the possible connection with religious extremism.
44	"A Model Murder"	Amanda Abbington and Simon Chandler guest star	AJ Quinn	Clive Dawson and P.G. Morgan	26 June 2007	512
45	"A Model Murder"	Amanda Abbington and Simon Chandler guest star	AJ Quinn	Clive Dawson and P.G. Morgan	27 June 2007	513
Part One: Kapoor and Stamp discover the body of a supermodel who had recently fronted an anti-fur campaign despite her lack of real conviction. Hart notes that the crime scene has been arranged to resemble a shot from the film, suggesting animal rights activists may have resented her hypocrisy. Subsequent investigations reveal a host of rival male admirers with reason to kill her and Perkins digs up evidence of a more sinister side to the woman's life – a porn film with footage of a missing 15-year-old runaway being at the dead woman's house. Meadows prepares to testify at the trial of disgraced detective Zain Nadir. Turner makes a move on crime scene photographer Rachel Inns. Part Two: Known stalker Larry Franks emerges as prime suspect in the Cindy Statham murder case – until CCTV footage reveals the model had a furious row in a restaurant with her half-brother on the day she died. The brother is found to be in hospital having been assaulted later that same day and, when he identifies Franks as his attacker, the team appears to have their man. Meanwhile, Kapoor reports an attack by an intruder at her flat, but is put in a compromising situation when her colleagues turn up and discover a bag of heroin.
46	"Match Day Violence"	—	Richard Signy	Andrew Taft	4 July 2007	514
Perkins, Casper, and Hollis go undercover in a pub, hoping to arrest a supplier of illegally imported goods. When a brawl breaks out in the pub between rival football fans, the team storms in and, amidst the resulting melee, Wright's husband Doug, on attachment from Barton Street, ends up stabbed. When the smuggling suspect, seen armed with a knife, is arrested after head-butting Doug on his headcam footage, their hopes of a quick result are squashed when he is cleared via video evidence. Elsewhere, Hardy's inside knowledge is called upon when Nixon and Walker investigate an assault linked to the new leader of the Sken gang.
47	"Cop Killer"	First appearance of PC Sally Armstrong; first and last appearance of PC Billy Rowan; final appearance of Sgt Doug Wright	Richard Signy and Michael Cocker	Chris Murray and Tom Higgins	5 July 2007	515
48	"Cop Killer"	First appearance of PC Sally Armstrong; first and last appearance of PC Billy Rowan; final appearance of Sgt Doug Wright	Richard Signy and Michael Cocker	Chris Murray and Tom Higgins	11 July 2007	516
Part One: Newly transferred PC Sally Armstrong arrives at Sun Hill, alongside young probationer Billy Rowan, where the team is anxious to find the man who stabbed Doug Wright. Paired with Wright and Keane, the foursome attend the raid on a suspect in Doug's stabbing, with Rowan heroically detaining the man when he resists arrest. They later get called to attend a disturbance at a jewellery shop, where Rowan helps Armstrong nail a thief who swallowed a ring. After another successful result, they are later called on to deal with a report of stone-throwing at an abandoned factory, where an ambush leads to Rowan's first day becoming his last. Part Two: Fired up by the attack on her husband Doug and the murder of Billy Rowan, Wright is determined to nail the killer. However, the identity parade proves a disappointment when she fails to pick out Greg Farnham and has to watch as he is set free to pursue his vendetta against the police. Undeterred, Wright and Armstrong trail him to a friend's house, where she learns he is in an agitated state of mind – and armed with a knife. Wright finds herself held hostage by the killer, but then ends up going all out to save his life when he locks himself in his deceased daughter's home.
49	"Behind Closed Doors"	—	Michael Cocker	Julia Wall	12 July 2007	517
After making a complaint about Gold's bullying behaviour, Keane is embarrassed to find herself working alongside the inspector on a tricky rape investigation, with the evidence not adding up. Hardy and Valentine attend to a young boy found collapsed with a bag of ecstasy pills in his pocket. Turner and Masters uncover the source of the tablets and a link to a drugs bust, but no one can foresee the events that follow.
50	"Where Loyalties Lie"	Final appearance of PC Lewis Hardy; Clifford Samuel and Lashana Lynch guest star	Robert Del Maestro	Maxwell Young	18 July 2007	518
51	"Where Loyalties Lie"	Final appearance of PC Lewis Hardy; Clifford Samuel and Lashana Lynch guest star	Robert Del Maestro	Maxwell Young	19 July 2007	519
Part One – Man Down: Hardy ends up spending the day with Dominic and members of the Sken gang after his suspension for the events of the night before. After being caught up in a kidnapping and the resulting revenge shooting, Hardy acts as a courier to deliver the kidnapped victim in return for a stolen gun. When an investigation Webb and Walker conduct into stolen explosives reveals the Skens are buying, Heaton sets up a sting. Hardy attends along with Dominic and two Skens, later blowing the op after seeing an unmarked CID car. When Valentine finds Hardy fleeing and confronts him, a Sken demands Hardy shoot his best friend, or he'll shoot both of them. Part Two – Death or Glory: Heaton briefs CID and Gold of Hardy's undercover role with the Skens. He explains that Valentine's "shooting" was part of his cover; however, speculation is rife in uniform, with them still in the dark over Hardy's involvement. Having been told by Dominic that the Skens are raiding a cash-in-transit van, Hardy is unable to alert his colleagues when he discovers they're actually hijacking a prisoner transport. The gang is found after the escape, and they are pursued, with Meadows proving support from the air. The gang escapes capture, allowing Hardy to reunite with Dominic, but they then get a reality check when they realise the danger they're in. As CO19 track them down, a shootout ensues, but will Lewis and Dominic get out alive?
52	"Copy Cat Killer"	Temporary departure of Insp Gina Gold; Darren Day and Laura Aikman guest star	Julie Edwards	Jane Marlow	25 July 2007	520
A photographer is arrested on suspicion of murdering one of his models. The discovery of a blood-soaked T-shirt at his trashed studio, and the evidence of his own pictures, suggest a second suspect may have delivered the fatal blows to the victim's head. Keane and Green tangle with a trio of truculent young women whose troubled history of deceit and blackmail leads to violence, putting the young officers in danger. Armstrong and Hollis attend the scene of a suspected assault.
53	"Trail of Blood"	Sergeant Dale Smith becomes A/Inspector	Julie Edwards	Sally Tatchell	26 July 2007	521
CID officers attend the funeral of murdered supermodel Cindy Statham, only to learn that killer Larry Franks has been transferred to hospital following a suicide bid. When he makes a break for freedom, a frantic search of the building ensues, and Beth is first to pick up the trail of blood. Smithy's first day as Acting Inspector goes from bad to worse when he has to call in the Firearms Command to sort out a building society robbery by two bungling ex-employees.
54	"Model Murder Uncovered"	Dorian Lough and Amanda Abbington guest star	Alan Macmillan	Si Spencer	1 August 2007	522
Larry Franks withdraws his confession to the murder of supermodel Cindy Statham, leading Masters to reopen the case, convinced they have the wrong man in custody. Crime scene photographer Rachel Inns returns and helps her work late into the night, re-examining the evidence, but just as Masters makes a breakthrough, a twist of fate sees her fall right into the real killer's lap. Meanwhile, Webb investigates a smash-and-grab raid on a jewellery shop and ends up arresting an old friend, Mod café owner Jerry Harper, whose daughter owns the scooter used as a getaway vehicle.
55	"Caught by the Killer"	Amanda Abbington guest stars	Alan Macmillan	Matthew Bardsley	2 August 2007	523
Concern grows for Masters’ safety when she fails to show up for work, and further study of the videotape made by Larry Franks yields vital clues to the killer's identity. A frantic search begins for the missing DC when Green discovers a gun has been stolen from the station store by Rachel Inns – and the culprit makes a break for freedom with Masters at gunpoint. As Manson leads the search, Turner and Dasari review her casework, hoping for a clue to her whereabouts, but have little luck until an unlikely source provides a big clue.
56	"Good Cop, Bad Cop"	First appearance of Sgt Callum Stone; Michael Angelis and Nicholas Courtney guest star	Kim Flitcroft	Jonathan Rich	8 August 2007	524
New sergeant Callum Stone makes an instant impact at Sun Hill by subduing a violent drunk in the station; he investigates the circumstances leading to the collapse of a woman brought in to the station by Casper and Stamp, but his maverick methods instantly alarm Casper and raise Smithy's hackles. Meanwhile, Perkins, Nixon, and Walker trace a series of threatening calls made to elderly women back to a single suspect, a supervisor at a kitchen fitting company, who is less than pleased to be arrested in a lift stalled between floors.
57	"Killing Me Softly"	Ben Keaton guest stars	Kim Flitcroft	Matthew Leys	9 August 2007	525
Following a report of vandalism on a church, Perkins finds himself investigating a case of assisted suicide in which conflicting evidence from the grieving family members suggests someone has something to hide. Meanwhile, Green and Valentine are called to a pet shop where the owner has been tied up and several dogs let loose, but it's Stone who realises there is something more sinister than youthful high-jinks going on, leading to the discovery of an assault at the home of a drug addict.
58	"Dicing with Danger"	Return of DS Phil Hunter; Michael Brandon and Dan Fredenburgh guest star	Diana Patrick	Carl Austin	15 August 2007	526
Hunter returns from Special Projects and is paired with Dasari, who knows from her colleagues over at SP where Hunter picked up an injury that he is exaggerating about. They investigate a woman who has been robbed of her winnings on the way home from a casino, and suspicion soon falls on the barman who called her a taxi. The case against the man grows stronger when it turns out they also arranged transport for another woman who was attacked, so Keane is sent undercover as a casino punter – only for events to take a surprising turn. Meanwhile, Stone and Casper are called to a domestic disturbance and uncover infidelity and drug use.
59	"Deadly Secrets"	Final appearance of PC Dan Casper; Michael Brandon guest stars	Diana Patrick	Len Collin	16 August 2007	527
An elderly woman with Alzheimer's goes missing with her great-granddaughter. Uniform runs the case led by Smith and Stone, with Nixon and Webb covering the CID angles. Fletcher gets his first FLO case, and just as it seems he's doing well, a blood-stained blanket appears nearby. The great-grandmother appears on a dual-carriageway, but there is no baby in sight. Nixon works on her to find the baby, while Fletcher works on the mother, who is arrested when she claims she got rid of the child. It appears she left her daughter at St Hugh's, but the great-grandmother did pick her up. Fletcher and Casper find the child, but Stone only acknowledges Fletcher's part in the finding of the baby, and Casper duly hands in his resignation when he is offered a security job in Ibiza. Meanwhile, Dasari and Hunter help casino owner Louis Dreyfuss deal with a man blackmailing his wife.
60	"Diamonds Are Deadly"	Dermot Crowley guest stars	Ben Morris	James Hall	22 August 2007	528
While on patrol, Stamp and Fletcher witness a near hit and run. The hysterical driver claims her husband has been abducted so that men can rob his jewellery store. CO19 storms the building and discovers the woman's husband has been shot, and his brother is tied up. CID hunt for the suspects, with Masters and Hunter surprised to see one of the brothers show up at the main suspect's house and attack him. They are both arrested, but the prime suspect has an alibi, and both are bailed. The suspect appears to be closer to the action than they first thought. Hunter helps Monica Dreyfuss when she thinks she sees someone in her garden, and again later when she is robbed and found extremely drunk in a restaurant. Manson clashes with Heaton over an arrest in the armed robbery case.
61	"Code of Silence"	Christopher Fox guest stars	Ben Morris	Chris Murray	23 August 2007	529
Armstrong and Keane investigate a missing person's case and uncover a rape. It is believed to be a gang control situation, but the victim won't press charges, so Armstrong tries to convince him to make a statement. He is apparently gay, and it was owing to him hitting on a man in a club. Manson coordinates a raid, but the police are shamed by the residents of the estate. Armstrong tries to unite the family when his sexuality comes out, as the victim of the rape tries to commit suicide. Keane completes her probationary period.
62	"Crash Test"	Charlotte Jordan guest stars	Karl Neilson	Stuart Morris	29 August 2007	530
Armstrong is surprised when she and Stamp attend an RTC where Perkins recovers the vehicle as a tow truck driver. They learn from Manson that Perkins is undercover to investigate a mother and son duo who are suspected of involvement in loan sharking. When the daughter of one of the drivers in the RTC is horrendously assaulted in an acid attack, Meadows and Manson try to get her father to testify against Perkins’ targets; Green is sent undercover as Perkins’ daughter, and he subsequently learns the targets are stealing cars to charge patrons for repairs to crashed vehicles that aren't fixed. Meanwhile, Armstrong and Stamp help the passenger of the other vehicle involved in the RTC, a Ukrainian immigrant who is trying to marry her considerably older boyfriend to gain citizenship to escape a violent pimp in her hometown. Heaton and Manson clash over methods again and end up having a heated argument outside CID.
63	"Up in Smoke"	Return of Insp Gina Gold; A/Insp Dale Smith returns to Sgt	Karl Neilson	Nicholas McInerny	30 August 2007	531
Smith and Noble attend to an assault; the victim is stabbed, but the suspect turns the tables by accusing her of dealing drugs from her burger van. Stone and Noble thus OBBO her flat, and a man who enters leads them to a house; Gold, back from her leave, sends the police chopper to do a fly by, and heat sources confirm the house is being used to produce cannabis. Stone tries to take credit, which is noticed by Noble and Smith. Meanwhile, Hunter and Turner work on a simple assault involving a former couple, and the girlfriend is now going out with her ex's best friend. The ex-boyfriend abducts his friend, but the case turns out to be a nonstarter when the friend ends up ditching his fiancée at the altar and reuniting with his friend. Gold makes their day worse by giving them a minor part in the raid on the cannabis factory; Stone reprimands Noble when she is put in danger during the raid.
64	"Deadly Shame"	Chris Walker guest stars	Simon Massey	Chris Ould	5 September 2007	532
65	"Deadly Shame"	Chris Walker guest stars	Simon Massey	Chris Ould	6 September 2007	533
Part One: Fletcher and Smith deal with a missing person's case. The victim, a 16-year-old girl, is found dead at the bottom of a fire escape. Fletcher is assigned as FLO. Investigation reveals the girl was on a downward spiral. Her boyfriend is arrested owing to a serious assault in his past, but the investigation takes a gruesome turn when Fletcher discovers a horrifying video clip given to him by her best friend. Part Two: Martin Parks is named as the prime suspect for the murder of his daughter Chloe. Her boyfriend, Ben Jackson, is still in custody as Nixon continues his interview. Fletcher convinces Karen Parks to speak out against her husband, and Martin is arrested as Ben's alibi is checked. Just as they seem they've got Parks, he clams up. The verdict determines suicide, and after Parks assaults his wife Karen, Fletcher and Stone find him at the top of the fire escape where Chloe's body was found.
66	"A Life of Lies"	Michael Brandon and Anna Wing guest star	Steve Kelly	Sally Tatchell	12 September 2007	534
Fletcher tries to convince Stone to tell the truth about Martin Parks' suicide, but Stone tells him "What goes around comes around" and that they wanted Parks to jump. While the events unfold, Fletcher and Kapoor work on several vigilante assaults on drug dealers; when a chance comment from the culprit tips him over the edge, Fletcher guiltily admits to Stone that he was right. Meanwhile, Dasari and Hunter investigate a burglary and assault on Monica Dreyfuss.
67	"Russian Roulette"	Michael Brandon guest stars	Steve Kelly	Steve Griffiths	13 September 2007	535
After a night of passion with Monica Dreyfuss, Hunter is held hostage by gunmen and forced to rob Louis' casino, with the threat that Monica will be killed if he doesn't comply. He manages to tip his colleagues off, but can't stop the gunmen escaping. Dasari is convinced Louis is behind it, but Hunter thinks the culprit is closer to home. Nixon and Manson contemplate reporting Hunter to the DPS for misconduct, but he goes off to nail his suspect for the abduction and robbery after being sent home by the two DIs.
68	"Identity Fraud"	Emma Samms, Stephen McGann and Kristian Kiehling guest star	Kate Robinson	Alan Pollock	19 September 2007	536
Kapoor, Fletcher, and Stone find a woman covered in blood, above her, stabbed personal trainer. Things are complicated when a search team find crystal meth in his flat. The woman is cleared when she says the drugs were stolen from a club owner. A handover takes place, but is nearly compromised, and the owner later denies the stabbing. As they dig deeper, it appears that the woman's husband may know more than he's letting on. Meanwhile, after attending an incident at a registry office, Stamp and Armstrong investigate a case of identity fraud involving a British man living in Australia.
69	"Back from the Brink"	—	Matt Bloom	Simon Moss	20 September 2007	537
Kapoor and Fletcher investigate a string of robberies. She is left unimpressed when Stone forces her to lie in interview after Fletcher tries to force a confession from a suspect by holding him over a balcony. Walker and Green tease Webb and Armstrong over flirtation between the two. They both work on an assault, and make a connection to a domestic incident that Wright and Keane dealt with.
70	"Dead and Buried"	Final appearance of PC Leela Kapoor; Pip Torrens guest stars	Matt Bloom	Simon Moss	26 September 2007	538
One of Stone's informants calls him about an assault on a fellow escort. Kapoor takes them out of the punter's house, but as they return to arrest him, he produces a diplomatic immunity card, and he is confirmed as Valatin Turivic, a European embassy official. Kapoor and Stone hope they can get him for drugs, so Fletcher and Stamp tail him. As Turivic hands over the drugs, Stone's informant tells Kapoor that Turivic may have killed an escort. Heaton orders a raid on his home, but time is of the essence as Turivic is flying out of the country. Kapoor is stunned when, out of the blue, she is offered a job at the Foreign and Commonwealth Office, but she is left unaware that Stone pulled the strings to secure her transfer. Meanwhile, Dasari and Hunter investigate the theft of a £20,000 painting.
71	"Cracking Under Pressure"	First appearance of PC Benjamin Gayle; Anton Phillips guest stars	Roberto Bangura	Nicholas Martin	27 September 2007	542
Turner leads the investigation into the disappearance of two children, and his approach during the appeal sees him selected for a new crime appeal TV show. Perkins is concerned when they see the children talking to a known sex offender. The mother suspects the father is involved. Fletcher is paired with new recruit Ben Gayle, and they deal with an assault. The rookie PC is cornered by three yobs, but Fletcher is surprised when they're on the ground and not him.
72	"Rough Justice"	—	Roberto Bangura	Scott Cherry	3 October 2007	543
Turner launches his new crime appeal TV show, Wanted. He then leads the investigation into his first televised crime, an aggravated burglary at the house of a barrister, who subsequently had a heart attack during the robbery. Hunter clashes with Gayle over the handling of a hostile witness, and their argument catches the attention of the entire CID office, but it's not in vain, as the witness comes forward. As a suspect is arrested, the witness mentions the name of the victim's son, who, on seeing the suspect, disappears from the station. Why is there the sudden guilty conscience?
73	"Back from the Dead"	John Rogan, Nicky Henson and George Layton guest star	Diana Patrick	Doug Milburn	4 October 2007	544
Armstrong and Keane find a badly beaten woman, who claims to be an asylum seeker whose political activist husband was murdered in Zimbabwe. When her son is found with a bag full of forged passports, CID intervenes, launching a major investigation. The son is abducted, and it is revealed that his violent and vengeful father is not dead, but is planning to take his son home to Zimbabwe. Meanwhile, Gold discovers a bank robber, she believed had died in a bank vault blast she was involved in years ago, is alive and well – and back in the country, forcing her to reopen an investigation into a twenty-year-old bank robbery which nearly killed her.
74	"Take it to the Grave"	First use of the new ITV end credits; Nicky Henson, John Rogan, Linal Haft and Bill Thomas guest star	Diana Patrick	Tom Higgins	10 October 2007	545
Gold fights to nail armed robbery suspect Vince Murray, who nearly killed her in the Tozer Street bank explosion in 1983. She enlists the help of her former Sergeant, Tom Ryan, who was paralysed in the blast, but a lack of evidence sees Murray bailed. Meadows authorises surveillance on Murray, and he meets up with the two survivors of the robbery. When they make a hoax armed robbery call, a real one goes down on the other side of the borough – a move that was also used in the Tozer Street job. Armstrong and Webb track down the armed robbers, Murray's son Darren and his best friend Kieran Forrest, whose dad Ian was killed in the Tozer Street robbery. Armstrong lets slip that Vince is alive, leading Kieran to attack her and Darren after realising his best friend's betrayal. When Darren and Kieran escape, Gold tracks them down in an armed showdown with Vince on the wasteground where the Tozer Street Bank used to stand.
75	"Uncut Killer"	Kacey Clarke and T'Nia Miller guest star	Robert Knights	Richard Ommanney	11 October 2007	546
Dasari is paired with Masters on her last day at Sun Hill. She tries to connect with a teenager who has a cocaine and eating habit, by giving up her best friend and dealer. Events turn sinister when the dealer is kidnapped by her supplier, and Meadows takes over the case. Dasari tells Meadows she wants to stay at Sun Hill CID, but when Hunter clears it with Special Projects, he is offered a DS post at the yard, and he tells his shocked CID colleagues he's accepted the posting.
76	"Collateral Damage"	Final appearance of DS Phil Hunter; first appearance of PC Nate Roberts	Robert Knights	Si Spencer	17 October 2007	547
Noble and Stone are paired and investigate a fire in a squat on the Jasmine Allen Estate. Masters and Walker investigate the fire. Smith joins door to door with new recruit PC Nate Roberts, and they discover one of the victims, Billy McLaughlin, an old army friend of Noble, had a bust-up with a local thug, Ross McGuiness. They discover his brother Tam is desperate to find them, but events take a sinister turn when Ross turns up dead in the boot of a car in a scrapyard where Billy used to work. Noble is held by Billy, but Tam shows up, not before badly beating Billy's girlfriend to get his location. Billy confesses to stabbing Ross to death, but Noble suspects he's not responsible. Hunter spends his last day at Sun Hill clearing his desk, and when Nixon is asked to be a reference, he is forced to tell her about the exaggerated injury he obtained during his secondment to Special Projects.
77	"Line of Fire"	Alison Pargeter and Tim Preece guest star	AJ Quinn	Clive Dawson and Steve Trafford	18 October 2007	550
78	"Line of Fire"	Alison Pargeter and Tim Preece guest star	AJ Quinn	Clive Dawson and Steve Trafford	24 October 2007	551
Part One: Hollis is stabbed while responding to reports of a prowler on the Aldbourne Estate, but he manages to stop an attack on a local mother, Shelley Cooper. Manson and Dasari lead the investigation and discover that Cooper lives on the same floor as a recently released man, Michael Simms, a paranoid schizophrenic whom Manson had jailed four years prior for attacking a woman. Stone draws reference to Cooper's resemblance to Simms' previous victim, leading to a clash with Manson. Enlisting the help of Simms' psychiatrist, Julia Bickham, Manson's digging leads to Simms being exposed and attacked. With pressure on him, spearheaded by Cooper's ex-boyfriend Chris Ramsden, Simms snaps and abducts Cooper. When her son, Jas, comes between Simms and Manson during negotiations, a gunshot rings out in the chaos. Meanwhile, Smithy deals with a community leader causing havoc while protesting the traffic on the Aldbourne, but later uncovers a shock link to the prowler attacks. Part Two: Manson launches a manhunt for paranoid schizophrenic Michael Simms after his apparent shooting of Shelley Cooper. Meadows and Heaton run as gold commanders from Sun Hill, while Manson and CO19 run as silver commanders on the ground. When Simms enters the office of Julia Bickham, Manson orders an evacuation and guides in CO19. His negotiation attempts fail, and when Bickham cries out, CO19 storms in on Manson's command, and they shoot Simms dead. When all that is left is a camcorder, the DPS are called in, leaving Meadows and Heaton searching for the crucial info to clear Manson's name. When Chris Ramsden confesses to the second prowler attack and planting evidence to try to frame Simms, Manson thinks he's in the clear, until the DPS twist things to dig him into deeper peril. Just when it seems like Manson is out of options, Walker makes a breakthrough that could save her boss's career.
79	"Deadly Intent"	First appearance of Leanne Samuels; Orlando Wells and Albert Moses guest star	Richard Signy	Steph Lloyd-Jones	25 October 2007	548
Noble attends to a disturbance in her block of flats, paired with Stone. They find a man with a head injury, sustained by an iron. They suspect his wife is at fault, but she is found dazed and confused with an iron burn on her arm. A file shows she previously self-harmed, and they suspect she still is. As they go to talk to her, they find her overdosing on sleeping pills, and they find an envelope with photos of her with a threatening note attached. Noble believes a neighbour is responsible, but before he is arrested, he and the husband are found fighting in the hallway of the building. As the case collapses, some hard graft and persistence from Stone sees it turn around. Meanwhile, Smithy has to arrest recent witness Carly Samuels for fraud.
80	"Stealth Attack"	Sid Owen guest stars	Richard Signy	Steve Ballie	1 November 2007	549
Turner and Masters are sceptical when a woman reports her sister missing after less than 12 hours; however, her concerns are justified when her sister is found assaulted and raped. When it appears she went off with a famous singer, Billy Peters, they try to track him down. When they do, Peters is assaulted by a friend of the victim, assuming Peters was responsible. Meanwhile, Smith gets involved with the Samuels family again when Carly's mother, Leanne, is arrested for assaulting a store owner, while Turner befriends the owner of a limo hire firm after he assists Turner on the assault case.
81	"Tortured Soul"	Georgia Henshaw guest stars	David Jackson	Si Spencer	8 November 2007	552
Gayle and Armstrong investigate an assault on a teenager. A fellow pupil, the brother of the victim's girlfriend, is suspected, but he is in Scotland; suspicion then falls on the girl's father, who is seen nearby on CCTV. A video is found of the victim forcing his girlfriend to strip, providing motive for the assault, but who sent it out? The victim claims his stepfather is sexually abusing him, but CID are sceptical and suspect the abuse came from the victim's deceased father. His mother dismisses this, but when Gayle and Armstrong call on her again later, they find her tied up, with her son standing over her armed with a hammer.
82	"Moving Target"	Final appearance of CSE Lorna Hart; Tom Chadbon, Colin McFarlane and Vic Tablian guest star	Paul Wroblewski	Steve Ballie and Frank Rickarby	14 November 2007	539
83	"Moving Target"	Final appearance of CSE Lorna Hart; Tom Chadbon, Colin McFarlane and Vic Tablian guest star	Paul Wroblewski	Steve Ballie and Frank Rickarby	21 November 2007	540
84	"Moving Target"	Final appearance of CSE Lorna Hart; Tom Chadbon, Colin McFarlane and Vic Tablian guest star	Paul Wroblewski	Steve Ballie and Frank Rickarby	28 November 2007	541
Part One: Wright and Stamp investigate a suspected racial assault. Heaton suspects that three racists from a supremacist gang, The Bulldogs of Patriotism, are responsible, but Masters is sceptical: she and Perkins subsequently discover the victim was whipped. His wounds and a bandaging make Masters think that his mother knows something, and she says it was his father who gave the beating. Meanwhile, Noble and Stone investigate a break in at the office of local MP Paul Sagger, but does the assault victim know more about it than he should? Sun Hill later patrol a concert, Rock Against Racism; things turn ugly when Sagger and Nadim Mura, the event coordinator and the assault victim's uncle, are shot as they appear on stage. Part Two: The team is left dealing with the fallout of the shooting at the Rock Against Racism concert. Nadim Mura gives Heaton a name, Abdul Muntaqim, but dies owing to a bullet in his lung, while Paul Sagger survives with a shoulder wound. Ahmed Hassar is questioned but denies involvement, although he confesses he set off a firecracker, which solves the mystery of four gunshots but only three shell casings. Masters and Perkins arrest a hospital porter, a member of the Bulldogs, who might have been responsible for killing Mura in hospital; he is not responsible, as Mura's postmortem reveals he was killed by a heart attack, but it's not in vain, as they uncover a conspiracy where the Bulldogs were going to kidnap Mura. Heaton continues the investigation into Sagger's alleged artefact smuggling, but the artefact, an ornamental dagger, which Sagger uses as a letter opener, has gone missing. Dasari makes a breakthrough, and identifies the name Heaton was given by Mura as Haqim Abd Al-Muntaqim; she and Manson go on to discover that Heaton was the target for the third bullet, but, as the DI calls to warn the Super, two bullets go through his car as he takes Sagger back to Sun Hill. Part Three: Gold runs the scene of the shooting at St Hugh's. Heaton and Sagger escape unscathed, but a suspect spotted by Heaton escapes. Heaton continues the artefact smuggling investigation, while Meadows runs the shooting investigation, and he discovers Sagger's assistant Derek Jacobs may be responsible. The man fleeing St Hugh's is identified as private investigator Alfredo Ruiz, hired by Sagger's estranged wife, and he gives CID Hakim Abd Al-Muntaqim's address, but it's too late: Jacobs got there first, and Muntaqim is dead. Heaton finally gets the evidence to nail Sagger for the smuggling, but, as the team gets ready to transfer the disgraced MP to another station, Jacobs shows up armed with a gun, and with a bomb strapped to himself...
85	"Love, Lies and Limos"	Sid Owen and Dominic Power guest star	James Larkin	Andrew Alty	5 December 2007	554
Noble and Fletcher respond to a call regarding a hijacked limousine, which they chase to a building site, whereupon the hijackers flee, revealing a hen party trapped in the back. Matters are complicated when a large amount of cocaine is found in the boot and the real driver's pregnant wife is found assaulted. Turner's driver, Trevor Jones, helps CID with useful information about a limo operator who is rumoured to be supplying cocaine as part of the champagne service. Webb poses as a city banker to gather evidence against the owner of the limo company, but has a few uncomfortable moments when it looks like his cover might have been blown. One of the captured hijackers subsequently claims he was working on behalf of a rival dealer, known only as 'The Postman'.
86	"Trapped"	Sid Owen and David Ryall guest star	James Larkin	Will Shindler	6 December 2007	555
CID's hunt for the drug kingpin known as 'The Postman' is disrupted when a prostitute is severely assaulted, while Turner's friend Trevor Jones takes a lesser beating trying to help her. A large quantity of cocaine is also found on the woman; her pimp is arrested, but both he and his dealer deny being 'The Postman'. Meanwhile, Gayle and Roberts investigate several attacks on a café and its owners; when a suspect in the case is also found in possession of a large amount of cocaine, he reveals he is working for 'The Postman', but Turner is left stunned when he inadvertently discovers who the mysterious dealer is...
87	"Blackmailed"	Sid Owen and Harry Landis guest star	Matthew Whiteman	Chris Dunn	12 December 2007	556
Turner is in hot water following the discovery that his friend Trevor Jones is 'The Postman'. He returns the evidence on his PDA, but when a raid goes down, Heaton and Manson begin to suspect there is a mole in CID. Desperate, Turner admits his dealings with Jones to Masters; the two hatch a plan to trick him into confessing off the record, but Jones isn't fooled. Fortunately, after raiding his limo firm, Perkins, Webb, and Walker manage to work out that Jones is 'The Postman' themselves; Turner goes to arrest him, but ends up stuck on his boat as he tries to flee the country.
88	"Operation Brass Balls"	Sam Kelly and Louise Marwood guest star	David Jackson	Andrew Taft	13 December 2007	553
Uniform set up a successful sting on a second-hand store; the arrested suspect asks to speak to Masters about people selling him stolen goods, which may be related to a warehouse robbery on a local industrial estate. Another sting is set up, but goes belly up when ram-raiders crash a 4×4 through the front of the store. At first, it appears that the ram-raiders wanted a camera that a woman seen in explicit videos on it wanted it back to cover up her secret affair, but her boyfriend is a villain from Meadows' past, and the team uncovers a cash-in-transit armed robbery plot. Meanwhile, Noble and Green discover a computer repair shop scam with a stolen laptop found in the second-hand store during the raid.
89	"Zain: Inside Out"	Guest appearance of ex-DC Zain Nadir; Jonny Phillips, Shane Zaza and Lloyd McGuire guest star	Robert Knights	Stuart Morris and Sarah-Louise Hawkins	19 December 2007	566
90	"Zain: Inside Out"	Guest appearance of ex-DC Zain Nadir; Jonny Phillips, Shane Zaza and Lloyd McGuire guest star	Robert Knights	Stuart Morris and Sarah-Louise Hawkins	20 December 2007	567
Part One: Disgraced ex-detective Zain Nadir is interviewed by Meadows about drug trafficking in Hayesend Prison, where he is serving ten years for perverting the course of justice, after Stone and Fletcher discover the body of a drug addict recently released from the prison. He reluctantly agrees to help his former colleagues infiltrate the gang involved, but Meadows is not sure whether he can trust him. He suspects his fears have been proved true when a riot breaks out just as the police move in to arrest the operation's kingpin, and Nadir's cellmate, Jason Forbes, who makes good his escape in the confusion. Part Two: Nadir gets a frosty reception at the station when Heaton secures his release from prison to help Meadows with the recapture of escaped killer Jason Forbes. Unsurprisingly, Nadir encounters hostility from several of his former colleagues, especially Fletcher, who can't help but take a swing at the man who callously disposed of Harman's body in a bid to save his own skin. The pursuit of Forbes leads to a gunpoint showdown, giving Nadir a clear choice between escape and leaving Forbes to kill Meadows, his wife, and his lawyer.
91	"Assault on Sun Hill"	First appearance of DS Max Carter; Richard Graham and Joseph Kpobie guest star	Darcia Martin	Matthew Bardsley and Len Collin	27 December 2007	568
92	"Assault on Sun Hill"	First appearance of DS Max Carter; Richard Graham and Joseph Kpobie guest star	Darcia Martin	Matthew Bardsley and Len Collin	28 December 2007	569
Part One: Perkins receives a tip-off regarding an armed robbery from an old informant, and pairs with new DS Max Carter, a transfer from CO19, to investigate it. When a car stolen in front of Armstrong and Gayle is linked to the robbery, Perkins discovers the thief is his informant’s son. When the informant goes in as the inside man, he is sussed and shot by ringleader Jimmy Duncan, and later dies in Perkins' arms. When Stone and Fletcher attend a report of a drunk man refusing to leave a pub, they find Perkins drowning his sorrows. Meanwhile, Armstrong and Gayle arrest two girls for failing to pay their cab fare, suspecting them of being drug mules. A search of the home of the cab driver who confiscated their bags uncovers a poisonous snake. When their release is delayed, their boyfriends arrive and take drastic action. Part Two: Armstrong and Stamp are taken hostage at gunpoint and dragged to custody, where Gayle and Wright are also drawn into the siege. When an CO19 officer is shot by the getaway driver, Stone and Fletcher alert IBO to the incident. Heaton and Nixon spearhead the negotiations, while Gold liaises with Wright, on behalf of the gunmen. As they release a hostage, fellow prisoner and armed robber Jimmy Duncan cons a rookie gunman into handing over a gun and shoots him dead. Perkins awakens from his drunken stupor to the siege, but upon discovering Duncan is leading it, tries to get him on side to avenge his informant’s death. If he can get Duncan to fall for it, can Perkins rescue his colleagues and deliver justice for Duncan’s two murder victims?
