= Justin Pickett =

British actor

Justin Pickett is an actor best remembered for his role in the Channel 4 situation comedy Desmond's. For six seasons he played the role of Sean Ambrose, son of the barber in whose eponymous shop the comedy is set, situated in the heart of Peckham. Pickett appeared in an episode of the spin-off series Porkpie in 1995.

From 2005 to 2007, Pickett had the recurring role of Chez Williams in the ITV1 police drama The Bill.

Theatre credits include the role of Edward in Charles Smith's Sentence Deferred at the Rosemary Branch Theatre in 2000.

Since 2004 he has served as musical director for Afterglow blu, a company promoting live music events in the Greater London area. He has also played drums in a soul-jazz band. He then started working with children and now works in Shacklewell primary school teaching children music.
