= Gary Webster (actor) =

British actor

- Born: Gary John Webster; 3 February 1964 (age 62); Whitechapel, London, England
- Occupation: Actor
- Years active: 1986–present
- Spouse: Wendy Turner (m. 1999)
- Children: 2

Gary John Webster (born 3 February 1964) is an English actor.

Born in Whitechapel, east London, Webster's first major TV role was in EastEnders playing Graham Clark from 1987 until 1988. He later became better known for playing Ray Daley in the television series Minder, replacing Dennis Waterman as George Cole's on-screen sparring partner in the series. Webster joined the series in 1991 and remained until its conclusion in 1994.

Subsequent to this, Webster took roles in soap operas. He made a brief appearance in Hollyoaks as Dion in 2001, and in Crossroads as Richard Mason the same year. He was later a regular in serial Family Affairs, playing Gary Costello from 2003 until the series ended at the end of 2005. He played tough drugs baron Paul Haskew in ITV drama series The Bill. In 2016, he returned to EastEnders, this time playing Neville Peacock in four episodes.

== Personal life ==
He has been married to Wendy Turner, the sister of Anthea Turner, since 1999, and they have two sons.

He was interviewed on BBC Breakfast on 27 May 2008 about his forthcoming book, Debt Rescue: How to Get Through a Year of Financial Ruin...and Survive!. The book follows Webster's debt problems, which began in his first series of Minder and included repossession of his property.

In autumn 2011 he suffered a "significant heart attack". He underwent heart surgery.

== Selected filmography ==
| Year | Title | Role | Notes |
|---|---|---|---|
| 1986 | London's Burning | Second Detective | TV movie |
| 1987 | Empire State | Paul's Man | Film |
| 1987 | Inspector Morse | Colin | Episode: "The Dead of Jericho" |
| 1987–1988 | EastEnders | Graham Clark | 11 episodes |
| 1988 | Boon | Paul | Episode: "Honourable Service" |
| 1990 | The Bill | Deacon | Episode: "Church Fields" |
| 1990 | Taggart | DS David Tilling | 3 episodes |
| 1991–1994 | Minder | Ray Daley | 36 episodes |
| 1995 | The Big Game | Jim Harper | TV movie |
| 1995 | The Queen's Nose | Grogan | 1 episode |
| 1997 | My Wonderful Life | Lawrie Johnson | 6 episodes |
| 1998–1999 | Real Women | Steve | 4 episodes |
| 1999 | The Blonde Bombshell | Dickie Dawson | 1 episode |
| 2000 | Casualty | Paul Meadows | Episode: "Travelling Light" |
| 2000 | Urban Gothic | Sam | Episode: "Old Nick" |
| 2001 | Crossroads | Richard Mason | TBC |
| 2001–2002 | Hollyoaks | Dion | TBC |
| 2002 | The Bill | Darren Saunders | 4 episodes |
| 2002 | Doctors | William Woods | Episode: "A Matter of Perspective" |
| 2003 | Adventure Inc. | Charlie Boyle | Episode: "Legacy of a Pirate" |
| 2003 | Holby City | Reece Baker | Episode: "Mum's the Word" |
| 2003–2005 | Family Affairs | Gary Costello | 82 episodes |
| 2004 | Down to Earth | Neil Blackwell | Episode: "Still Waters" |
| 2006 | Casualty | Ned Prior | Episode: "Get What You Deserve" |
| 2006–2007 | The Bill | Paul Haskew | 10 episodes |
| 2007 | Underground | Brandon Glover | Film |
| 2008 | Holby City | Steve McKendrick | Episode: "Only Believe" |
| 2016 | EastEnders | Neville Peacock | 4 episodes |
| 2017 | Dangerous Game | Detective Graham Crawford | Film |
| 2018 | Dead Ringer | Benny | Film |
| 2019 | Stages | David | Film |
| 2019 | The Seven | Mr. Williams | Film |
| 2020 | The Dumping Ground | Al | 2 episodes |
| 2020 | Glia | Jon Neilson | Film |
| 2024 | Bemondsey Tales: Fall of the Roman Empire | Mick | Film |
| 2025 | Dream Hacker | Professor William Hanson | Film |
| 2025 | The Full House | DCI Giggs | Film |
| 2026 | Doctor Plague | Eddie Crawford | Film |
| 2026 | Jackie the Stripper | John Grey | Film |
| 2026 | Harbinger | Mike | Film |
