= The Bill series 21 =

The Bill
- Series 21
- Series 21 DVD cover
- No. of episodes: 106

Release
- Original network: ITV
- Original release: 5 January – 29 December 2005

Series chronology
- ← Previous; Series 20 Next → Series 22

Series 21 of British television drama The Bill was broadcast from 5 January until 29 December 2005. The series consists of 106 episodes, making it the series with the highest number of episodes in the show's final decade, tied with series 19. On 5 February 2014, the complete series was released on DVD in Australia as a Region 0, playable anywhere in the world.

== Theme ==
The first half of series 21 remained a soap opera styled show, focused primarily on the personal lives of the characters with policing secondary at times, more so than recent years with big plots focused on the characters directly rather than their job, such as DC Jim Carver's bid to win back estranged wife Sergeant June Ackland, PC Honey Harman's romance with a murderer she met through a case and Inspector Gina Gold's battle with cancer. The series aired its second station fire in three years as racist PCSO Colin Fairfax staged a terrorist attack to shift blame onto the local Muslim community, the blaze resulting in the deaths of DC Ken Drummond, PC Andrea Dunbar and SRO Marilyn Chambers. The fire also served as the exit plot for pilot star Mark Wingett, DC Jim Carver controversially axed after 21 years. Following the death of his first wife Marie and later his best friend Ken in the station fire, Jim left Sun Hill after learning estranged wife June had begun an affair with experienced PC Roger Valentine. His exit led to three episodes in a single night, the fire aftermath followed up with a half-hour special focused on Jim and June that saw Jim decide to leave her behind to rebuild his life, the night's third episode part of the Uncovered spin-off series as it showed Jim's most memorable clips from his time on the show. Another spin-off, Uncovered: On the Front Line, was pulled before broadcast, but aired a year later in Australia.

Midway through the year, executive producer Paul Marquess resigned after three years in the role, replaced by sister series Murder Investigation Team exec Johnathan Young after the spin-off was cancelled. Young began plans to move the series away from soap and back into policing drama, swiftly writing out soap-style villain PC Gabriel Kent, whose actor Todd Carty had already announced he was quitting the show, with the character committing suicide after being exposed for identity theft, murder, rape and a litany of other crimes. Young also brought an end to several Marquess era plots including Gina Gold's aforementioned battle with cancer and DC Terry Perkins' affair with his imprisoned brother's wife. However, he carried the plot surrounding Sergeant Dale Smith's affair with villain's wife Louise Larson (Rosie Marcel) into the next series. Young carried on the Marquess tradition of casting actors known for softer roles by introducing Birds of a Feather star Pauline Quirke as a child killer for one of his first plots. Young was also tasked with leading the show's second live episode, commemorating the 50th anniversary of ITV. The special episode showed a siege at Sun Hill in which several members of the relief were held hostage by a grieving father, seeking justice for his son's accidental death in a traffic collision. The episode saw a return for Gabriel Kent's alter ego to kickstart his exit plot but also brought back Cyril Nri as Superintendent Adam Okaro, whose time off-screen on break was preceded by the death of Okaro's wife and two children in a tragic car crash.

== Cast changes ==
The station fire plot meant there were already several exits and new arrivals under Paul Marquess before his resignation, but he also axed Ciaran Griffiths after three years as DC Gary Best for a summer plot that saw him transfer after being shot on duty. Several recurring cast members were introduced by Marquess for personal plots tied to Sun Hill officers, but many of them were written out either before the year ended or early in 2006 by his successor Johnathan Young. Young introduced Hollyoaks and Footballers' Wives star Gary Lucy as PC Will Fletcher and brought back Chris Simmons as DC Mickey Webb after joining the series, but most of his cast work was to axe the fringe characters and non-police officers introduced by Marquess. He also ended a Marquess plot, the show's third serial killer storyline in as many years, by fatally writing out PC Lance Powell as the culprits were targeting gay men: it meant along with Gabriel Kent and the station fire victims, it was the second highest tally of police officer deaths in a series with 5, second only to the ten killed off in 2002. Bernie Nolan was the only actor who left after Young took over that resigned, as she was intent on returning to her music career.

=== Arrivals ===
- DC Jo Masters ("Cure the Sin"–)
- PCSO Laura Bryant ("He Who Has No Will"–) – Returning character
- PCSO Colin Fairfax ("He Who Has No Will" – "Life's Too Short")
- PC Dan Casper ("In the Driving Seat"–)
- SRO Julian Tavell ("Operation Mercury, Part 1"–)
- DC Zain Nadir ("Moving Target"–)
- DRO Rochelle Barratt ("Maintain Cover" – "Back to Basics, Part 2")
- Ex-CPS Lawyer Jonathan Fox ("One Step Too Far" – "A Small Price to Pay, Part 2") – Returning character
- Ch Supt Ian Barratt ("A Small Price to Pay, Part 3" – "Back to Basics, Part 2")
- Supt Amanda Prosser ("Beggars and Bent Coppers" – "The Anniversary, Part 2")
- DS Mickey Webb ("Back to Basics, Part 1"–) – Returning character
- PC Will Fletcher ("Reunited"–)

=== Departures ===
- DC Ken Drummond – Killed in the Sun Hill fire
- PC Andrea Dunbar – Killed in the Sun Hill fire
- SRO Marilyn Chambers – Dies in hospital following the Sun Hill fire
- DC Jim Carver – Leaves following the breakdown of his marriage to June Ackland
- PCSO Colin Fairfax – Arrested and jailed for the murder of his three colleagues
- DC Gary Best – Transfers back to Manchester after being shot on duty
- CPS Lawyer Jonathan Fox – Leaves after the breakup of his friendship with Gina Gold
- Supt Amanda Prosser – Departs after handing control of the station back to Adam Okaro
- PC Gabriel Kent – Commits suicide after he is revealed as a murderer, rapist and impostor
- Ch Supt Ian Barratt – Moves away after discovering his wife had an affair with Dan Casper
- DRO Rochelle Barratt – Leaves Sun Hill to start a new life with her husband
- PC Sheelagh Murphy – Transfers to the Child Protection Unit
- PC Lance Powell – Murdered by a gay serial killer operating in Sun Hill
- PC Amber Johannsen – Resigns after deciding she is not cut out for the job

== Episodes ==
#	Title	Episode notes	Directed by	Written by	Original air date	Prod #
1	"Cure the Sin"	First appearance of DC Jo Masters	Jo Johnson	Joe Fraser	5 January 2005	275
Murphy becomes anxious when she is unable to contact Powell hours before his marriage ceremony. Hunter tries to find out if anyone knows where Powell went when he left his stag do, but anxiety turns to fear when the CCTV which he pulls from the pub shows Powell being kidnapped and bundled into the back of a van. Unaware that his so-called 'friends' are behind the vicious attack, determined to 'cure' him of his homosexuality, Valentine is blind to the fact Lance is in the next room when he is plugging his friend for information. Meanwhile, Perkins discovers his brother Ben's new address, and tries to convince Ben's wife Lucy of his suspicions that Ben has been abusing his nephews.
2	"Double Jeopardy (Part One)"	First appearance of Nurse Nick Austin; Miles Anderson guest stars	Sylvie Boden	Andrew Taft	6 January 2005	276
Valentine and Hunter arrest a drink driver caught at the wheel of his car, only to discover that he is one of Meadows' former prisoners who absconded from police custody two years previously. While in custody, the suspect is taken ill with a possible virus and sent to St. Hugh's. Hemmingway guides a uniform team to take control of a minor protest outside the hospital, but an unknown man riles them into a riot, with his ulterior motive revealed; he and his brother are sons of the escaped con and are planning to take him out of the hospital. As Harman encounters one of the brothers, she finds herself held at gunpoint.
3	"Double Jeopardy (Part Two)"	Miles Anderson guest stars	Sylvie Boden	Damian Wayling	12 January 2005	277
Meadows and Manson arrive at St. Hugh's to speak to suspect Roland O'Brien, only to walk right into the middle of a hostage situation – finding themselves being tied up in the boiler room by O'Brien's deranged son. Okaro arrives to take charge of the situation, and assigns Masters as negotiator, despite it being her first day. Having dealt with son Anthony, Masters attempts to use her knowledge of O'Brien and brings in his ex-girlfriend, who is now carrying his baby. Meanwhile, Hunter launches himself back into Harman's good books when he rescues her from her captor. As the riot dwindles and Roland's condition worsens, Anthony becomes more unstable, leading Valentine into desperate and lethal action. Nixon's daughter Abi shows up at St. Hugh's in the aftermath with a massive bombshell for her mother.
4	"He Who Has No Will"	Return of now-PSCO Laura Bryant; first appearances of PCSO Colin Fairfax and Scott Burnett	Nigel Keen	Harold Jordan	13 January 2005	278
Smithy is assigned to puppywalk two new PSCOs assigned to the station – Colin Fairfax and Laura Bryant, with Kent partnering Bryant again after their criminal antics on the Cole Lane estate a year ago. The group investigate when a group of local youths vandalize lifts in a local tower block, and then attack the property of a local resident. However, an illegal search conducted by Bryant proves to be an issue in securing a conviction. Meanwhile, Carver is assigned as SIO on the case of Karen Burnett, who has disappeared without trace on her way home from work. Harman is delighted to get her first role as Family Liaison Officer, and speaks to the victim's husband, Scott, who is concerned for her welfare. Elsewhere, Nixon's horror that daughter Abi is pregnant with abductor Hugh Wallis' baby, and that they intend to marry, leads her to play Hugh at his own game.
5	"Motivated By Love"	—	Nigel Keen	Graham Mitchell	19 January 2005	279
Nixon puts her career on the line by abducting daughter Abi, hiding out in Peter Baxter's empty flat in an attempt to stay out of Hugh Wallis' clutches. Back at the station, Wallis stirs the pot when he reports her to Meadows, then reports Hunter after the pair clash in a pub. Nixon desperately tries to make Abi realise she has been brainwashed, but she ends up lamenting when Wallis finds them and violently breaks in. As they are cornered by both Wallis and CID, Abi is left to choose: her mother or her ex-fiancée. Meanwhile, Perkins and Carver interview one of Karen Burnett's friends, and in a search of wasteground near to his place of work, she is found dead having been the victim of a violent assault. As Harman comforts Scott, the team are left pondering to charge their prime suspect or question why the case seems too easy to solve.
6	"A Difficult Subject"	Final appearance of Dr Hugh Wallis; final regular appearance of Abigail Nixon; Shane Zaza guest stars	Laurence Moody	Katherine Smith	20 January 2005	280
Masters and Sim investigate when a young boy is attacked in an area known to be frequented by rent boys. Arresting their prime suspect proves to be the catalyst for a much bigger problem, when suspect Ravi Shah accuses DAC Roy Pearson of being part of a paedophile ring. However, when Sim organises a raid on the home of known pimp Julian Hargreaves, she fails to uncover any proof of his involvement. Meanwhile, Nixon is determined to nail Hugh Wallis for the abduction and rape of her daughter, but all her joy at nailing her old boyfriend is quashed by seeing what the questions are doing to Abi. Elsewhere, Harman tries to break things off with Scott Burnett after revealing prime suspect Greg Campbell has been charged with the murder of his wife Karen, but temptation proves too much for the pair.
7	"Ignorance vs. Prejudice"	Margaret Barnes joins Sun Hill as CSSC, DAC Roy Pearson retires; Kelly Marcel guest stars	Laurence Moody	Isabelle Grey	26 January 2005	281
Valentine and Powell discover the decomposing body of a vagrant on some wasteground, but they fail to ID the victim despite extensive investigation. Fingerprint analysis provides the break they need, but the team are stunned to discover it is Jim's ex-wife, Marie. Elsewhere, Powell and Kapoor investigate a case of criminal damage; however, the case soon escalates when the accused claims that the victim is her ex-boyfriend and he has deliberately infected her with HIV. Kapoor soon suspects that Murphy's aggressive attitudes towards the suspect may be a result of racial prejudice. Meanwhile, Manson confronts his father-in-law over allegations made by Ravi Shah, and Fairfax shows a nasty racist side to his character.
8	"Talk is Cheap"	—	Richard Standeven	Henrietta Hardy	27 January 2005	282
Murphy and Kapoor are called to the scene of an unconscious baby, who subsequently dies in hospital. When a neighbour accuses the parents of abusing the baby, Murphy struggles to put memories of her own daughter's death to one side and finds herself questioning who is responsible. Meanwhile, Hemmingway and Johannsen investigate when a robber leaves a rather strange calling card at the scene of his latest burglary – a picture of his backside on the fax machine. Hunter and Perkins then discover an elaborate plan to set-up the husband of the robber's ex-girlfriend. Manson blows his top and assaults Hunter when he makes a snide remark about his father-in-law's use of rent boys.
9	"Friday Night Shift"	First appearance of Kate Maltby	Richard Standeven	Harold Jordan	2 February 2005	283
Best is furious when his prime suspect for the assault of a young boy is freed from custody after the boy refuses to give evidence, but as he unwinds in a club, he spots him dealing, leaving Hunter to go undercover. Meanwhile, Hemmingway is tasked with overseeing her first Friday night shift as Acting Sgt Johannsen attends a distress call from an old friend who accuses a man of groping her in a bar; she ignores her plea, but the situation turns from bad to worse when a second call comes in and the girl is found raped. Hunter attends a sex addiction clinic – and ends up taking one of the girls home! A relationship ends for his brother Steve, however, when Harman dumps him for Scott Burnett.
10	"The Suttle Approach"	Return of Sgt June Ackland; Briony McRoberts guest stars	Sven Arnstein	Roy Boulter	3 February 2005	284
Best decides to call in sick after his night of passion with his date from the nightclub. Hunter and Drummond investigate when Hemmingway stops and searches a driver who is found in possession of a large quantity of cash – and a bag of cocaine. When Hunter and Drummond discover a link between the driver and Best's date, the young DC realises he has been caught up in the middle of a money laundering scam. Meanwhile, Dunbar attends when a young woman is found having been raped by a minicab driver the night before, and decides to set up a sting to catch the culprit in action. Ackland returns to duty following her early retirement, but she makes it plain to the relief that she's not prepared to be a figure of fun or pity. Carver attends the funeral of ex-wife Marie.
11	"Of No Fault"	—	Sven Arnstein	Steve Griffiths	9 February 2005	285
Best is determined to bring his former lover to justice for her part in the money laundering scam, and when Hunter and Drummond's undercover operation goes awry, Best realises the pressure is entirely on his shoulders to get a result. A surprise comes when Masters uses a neat trick to cover up Best's part in the scam. Meanwhile, Ackland and Valentine are called to a disturbance at a train station, where a group of rowdy schoolgirls have been accused of fare dodging. As a scuffle ensues, Johannsen jumps to Kapoor's defence when one of the girls tries to attack her with a broken bottle. Valentine, however, comes off worse when one of the girls accuses him of sexually assaulting her during the skirmish.
12	"In the Driving Seat"	First appearance of PC Dan Casper; Sophie Stanton, James Buckley and Janine Wood guest star	Michael Cocker	David Lane	16 February 2005	286
Carver investigates a malicious communication sent to the MD of a law firm, but discovers that someone close to home may be responsible. Meanwhile, Smithy, Kent, Dunbar and Bryant begin the search for an Alzheimer's patient who has disappeared from his family home. When Kent catches three youths attacking the man, a scuffle ensues and the boy receives a facial injury, but Dunbar can't be sure if Kent dealt the blow. When Dunbar digs with Bryant to get dirt on Kent, he issues her a stern warning not to interfere. At Hendon, Johannsen and Kapoor are paired with PC Dan Casper from Spicer Street to undertake the response level driving course, but Johannsen's driving skills leave much to be desired, and her attempts to chat up the lesbian instructor go even worse. Manson catches Dunbar with her editor, and she is forced to confess to him that she is a journalist.
13	"Exposé"	Jonathan Coy and James Clyde guest star	Michael Cocker	Rod Lewis	17 February 2005	287
Fairfax's racist attitude rears its ugly head when he is first on the scene of a racially motivated argument between a garage owner and an Asian customer who is refusing to pay. Smithy suspects that he and the suspect, who are old workmates, have concocted a false report in an attempt to throw the light onto the Asian victim. Meanwhile, Nixon receives a grilling when she takes to the stand at the trial of serial rapist Alan Kennedy, when the QC attempts to use her decision to use Hugh Wallis on the case against her. Kapoor ends up chasing a suspect during her final drive on the training course, but a less than sensible Johannsen fails to even reach her final drive after nursing a hangover. When Dunbar's editor discovers she is being called to give evidence in court, he exposes her on the front page of the Daily News.
14	"Confessions of a Killer"	Final appearance of DC Ken Drummond; Jonathan Coy, Davood Ghadami and James Clyde guest star	Nic Phillips	Simon Moss	23 February 2005	288
It is judgement day for Dunbar after her exposure as a journalist, leaving her to face the wrath of Gold and Okaro, while Manson ditches his mistress as he accuses her of being two-faced. To make matters worse, her credibility is shot to pieces when giving evidence against serial rapist Alan Kennedy, who walks free as a result. Dunbar persuades Smithy to let her get the final piece of evidence to nail Kent, but she finds herself cornered by the deranged copper, who holds her hostage before confessing to all of his crimes. Elsewhere, Kapoor clashes with Fairfax over his handling of a suspect in custody, and, after the clash ends with him spitting in her face, Fairfax is dismissed and storms away. When Drummond goes to bring him back, the events end up tearing Sun Hill apart in more ways than one.
15	"Inferno"	Final appearances of PC Andrea Dunbar and SRO Marilyn Chambers; Davood Ghadami guest stars	Nic Phillips	Mark Johnson	24 February 2005	289
Okaro and Gold spearhead the evacuation of Sun Hill as a massive blaze takes control of the front of the building. Kent leaves a desperate Dunbar to perish after initially failing to rescue her, but ends up the hero when he rescues Smithy from the burning front office, unaware that Chambers is a matter of feet away. CID report Manson and Drummond missing, but while Manson shows up after failing to find Dunbar at home, Smithy confirms everyone's worst fears when he reveals Drummond was in the back of the burning van. Manson becomes worried for Dunbar when she is deemed missing, and a sweep finds her body, and while Hollis reunites with a badly injured Chambers at hospital, he is devastated when she succumbs to her injuries. Ackland and Carver have personal crises related to the fire, but their relationship problems come to the fore when Carver rumbles her affair with Valentine.
15a	"Moving On"	Special half-hour episode, final regular appearance of DC Jim Carver; Jane Hazlegrove guest stars	Sylvie Boden	Katherine Smith	24 February 2005	289a
After finding Ackland and Valentine in a passionate clinch, Carver joins his mourning colleagues at the pub after falling off the wagon. When Ackland turns up to talk him round, the sight of Valentine infuriates Carver, who viciously attacks his love rival. A screaming match with Ackland soon turns into a heart to heart. When they come across a prostitute and her punter having a fight, their respective conversations with their arrests leads to them to separate conclusions, but will their futures be together?
15b	"Jim's Story"	Third of four "Uncovered" documentaries	Henry Klejdys	Julie Hill	24 February 2005	TBA
Carver arrives home at his new flat, but soon comes to realise exactly what he has left behind. With nothing but a bottle of scotch and a run-down sofa, he starts to reminisce about his twenty-two-year career at Sun Hill. He discusses the events of his first day; his two different stints working in CID, with the first having ended owing to the controversial "tenure" process that was in effect at the time; his return to uniform and struggle with alcohol addiction; his transfer to CSU which he saw as the ladder back into CID; and his gambling debts of over £60,000, which nearly cost him his life at the hands of an evil loan shark, Zacadelli.
16	"Slipping Away"	Final appearance of Ch Supt Louise Campbell	David Innes Edwards	Christopher Reason	2 March 2005	290
Kapoor and Stamp deal with a group of Asian youths who are taunting the residents of the local estates and the police. Kapoor performs a stop and search, but fails to find any incriminating evidence. Later, they are called to the scene when one of the local residents has imprisoned one of the youths in a phonebox for scrawling graffiti over a police poster. However, the incident takes an unexpected turn when the resident turns out to be the leader of a local extremist group, and Stamp spots disgraced PCSO Fairfax fraternizing with him. Meanwhile, Valentine and Johannsen deal with the case of a young mother who is refusing to give social services access to her child, until the child's father makes a shocking move.
17	"Life's Too Short"	Final appearance of ex-PCSO Colin Fairfax; James Clyde guest stars	David Innes Edwards	Harold Jordan	3 March 2005	291
Valentine and Powell investigate a series of attacks aimed at the Asian community from a group of local schoolboys, including racist graffiti and a pig's head being nailed to the door of their Islamic centre. The situation spirals out of control and one victim is stabbed during a street robbery. Meanwhile, Hunter and Harman arrest a shoplifter who has stolen CDs from her local supermarket, only to discover that the jacket she is wearing links her to a series of jewellery thefts where more than £15,000 of jewellery was stolen. Meadows and Masters hunt firebomb suspect Fairfax, but after finding crucial evidence, they track him down at his friend's garage – threatening to burn the place to the ground, with everyone inside...
18	"The Calm Before the Storm"	DI Neil Manson takes leave; Lucy Cohu and Selva Rasalingam guest star	Robert Bierman	Nicholas McInerny	9 March 2005	292
Hunter and Perkins continue the investigation into the stabbing of Asian victim Hannah Begum, but suspect that her evidence isn't true to the events of the incident. Meanwhile, racial unrest continues to loom over the borough. Murphy, Kent and Bryant are forced to break up a gang of youths smashing up cars on a local estate, while Kapoor and Valentine are called to the scene of a violent assault in a video shop. Kapoor persuades her father to make a statement after she discovers that he witnessed an Asian man carry out the attack. Meanwhile, the funerals of Drummond and Dunbar take place, but Neil is torn over whether to attend the funeral of his former lover, or his friend and former colleague.
19	"Taking a Stand"	DI Rowanne Morell is seconded to Sun Hill	Robert Bierman	Stephen Plaice	10 March 2005	293
Perkins and Hunter are put through their paces when Morrell arrives from MIT to cover for an absent Neil. As they continue on the trail of suspect Salim Haq, Kapoor urges her hospitalised father to make a statement against his attackers. Masters and Best end up on the trail of a violent pimp responsible for an attack on the girlfriend of one of his toms, but Masters offers the tom a way out of the situation by suggesting that she becomes a police informant. Meanwhile, Murphy and Kent find a young girl hurt in the middle of the street, and Kent shows his compassionate side by attempting to protect the girl when he suspects that she is being abused by her mother.
20	"A Different Ball Game"	Susan Gilmore and Selva Rasalingam guest star	Alan MacMillan	Graham Mitchell	16 March 2005	294
Kapoor finally manages to persuade her father to give evidence against Salim Haq, but an intimidating message accompanied by a bouquet of flowers become the catalyst for him to change his mind. Masters warns Best against approaching prostitute Eve Miller for information, but Best ignores her orders and Masters is forced to pick up the pieces. As Hunter and Morrell get closer to nailing Haq, Masters and Hunter find that a handgun is missing from rival Yusef Miah's flat. Meanwhile, Kent sets out to prove schoolgirl Gemma Bentley is being abused by her stepmother, and finds an ally in Murphy. However, his methods are soon questioned when the stepmother comes into the station to make a complaint. Hollis attends the funeral of his late fiancée Chambers.
21	"An Ominous Warning"	—	Alan MacMillan	Harold Jordan	17 March 2005	295
Kent sets out to rescue schoolgirl Gemma Bentley when the girl disappears without trace; he manages to locate her grandmother, who provides some vital information as to the child's whereabouts. Suspecting that the girl is being held prisoner, Kent conducts an illegal search and finds the young girl locked away in a cold, damp unlit cellar. As the evidence against her wicked stepmother racks up, Kent is rewarded for his efforts with a passionate kiss from Murphy. Meanwhile, Gold is stunned to discover she has cancer, but she takes her mind off the news by assisting Powell and Johanasen with the investigation of an elderly woman who has been robbed and assaulted by a local youth. Gold is disgusted to discover that during the attack, the boy also took off all of his clothes and raped the woman.
22	"Operation Mercury (Part One)"	First appearance of SRO Julian Tavell; Ram John Holder guest stars	Dermot Boyd	Neil Jones	23 March 2005	296
Bryant and Powell head up a new operation on the Cole Lane Estate, known as Operation Mercury. Their attempt to get two young boys to give up information on a known dealer results in them crossing paths with an elderly man known as 'ASBO Boy', who has been harassing local youths for playing cricket in the street. While they deal with the latest incident involving 'ASBO Boy', Hemmingway and Hunter attend the scene when a drug dealer is thrown from a walkway on the estate. They soon discover an elderly resident has been flyposting pictures of the dealer in an attempt to name and shame him. Hunter is forced to arrest Scott Burnett after he is caught brawling with Greg Campbell, who is cleared of all charges in the case of Karen Burnett's murder.
23	"Operation Mercury (Part Two)"	Ram John Holder guest stars	Dermot Boyd	Stuart Morris	24 March 2005	297
Powell and Bryant attempt to build relations on the Cole Lane estate by attempting to find common ground with both the young and the old's love of Cricket. Meanwhile, Masters and Perkins' investigation into the assaulted drug dealer throws up an interesting name in the form of Wesley James, who according to source is responsible for supplying a number of dealers on the estate. Morrell asks Best to organise a bust in an attempt to catch James in the act, leaving Best starstruck – until his failure to inform uniform soon results in a major cock-up of the operation. Meanwhile, Hemmingway and Harman investigate when a bin-raiding gang begin targeting a very lucrative block of flats in a rich part of town.
24	"Abuse in Kind"	PC Dan Casper transfers to Sun Hill	Chris King	Maxwell Young	30 March 2005	298
Dan Casper arrives for his first day at Sun Hill, and immediately risks life and limb to rescue a girl attempting to kill herself on a dual carriageway. He discovers that the young girl, Rosa Salcedo, who is Brazilian, is deaf and is unable to lip-read, but when an interpreter finally turns up, Casper discovers that Rosa has been raped and beaten by her employers. When Rosa absconds from a safe house, Casper and Best discover that she has been having a relationship with her employer's son, and that he is responsible for her pregnancy. As they discover Rosa has been taken to have an unwanted abortion, Casper and Best race to save her, but despite their best efforts, the case has a tragic ending. Smithy returns after his injuries in the fire; however, the tragedy from the Salcedo case leaves an emotional Gold revealing her cancer to Smithy.
25	"To Protect and Serve"	PC Roger Valentine transfers to VPU; John Cater, Andy Linden and James Clyde guest star	Chris King	Harold Jordan	31 March 2005	299
Nixon and Perkins continue covert surveillance of Alan Kennedy, but their day goes from bad to worse when JT puts an innocent woman's life at risk by giving her Kennedy's address to pick up her lost handbag. With the operation blown, Perkins soon realises that the woman's accusations against Kennedy are unfounded. Meanwhile, Stamp and Hollis deal with an interesting case where two burglars appear to have broken into the same flat at the same time, while Valentine's first day in VPU finds him and Ramani dealing with the case of an elderly man who has been robbed and assaulted while withdrawing money. Valentine soon discovers that the robber is someone close to home.
26	"Moving Target"	First appearance of DC Zain Nadir; Lynn Ferguson and James Clyde guest star	Nigel Keen	Julian Unthank	6 April 2005	300
Powell, Bryant and Murphy continue their efforts on the Cole Lane Estate when an elderly man is attacked, and suspicion falls on two local dealers – one of whom is under surveillance by CID, and Powell's failure to report the attack results in uniform blundering right through a CID operation again. However, the case takes an ugly turn when one of the dealers is shot dead at the wheel of his car. Valentine investigates the hoax call made to DeCosta's ex-boyfriend with a less than tactful approach. Stamp and Hollis attend the scene when Alan Kennedy is found badly beaten in his home, and Nixon and Perkins discover the man responsible is a friend of Kennedy's first victim.
27	"Dangerous Territory"	Guest appearance of now-DS Mickey Webb; Lynn Ferguson, Nigel Lindsay and James Clyde guest star	Nigel Keen	Harold Jordan	7 April 2005	301
DS Pete Lancaster from Trident arrives to take over the case involving the shooting of drug dealer Andy Marshall. Powell's suspicions that rival Adi Mateen is responsible for the shooting finds him entering a murky world of rival dealing. Bryant manages to identify a young girl spotted running away from the scene, and the prime suspect is soon identified as dealer Carlton Gayle. Meanwhile, Nixon and Perkins are on the trail of Alan Kennedy when he claims to have kidnapped one of his former victims. However, Nixon soon realises that Kennedy has set a trap for her. DeCosta deals with a woman who has been savagely beaten by her husband, but is upset when the woman's witness statement disappears.
28	"The Decoy (Part One)"	Guest appearance of DS Mickey Webb; Lara Cazalet, Lucy Cohu, Dominic Mafham and Desmond McNamara guest star	Rob Knights	Tom Needham	13 April 2005	302
Mickey Webb, now a DS with the National Crime Squad, returns to Sun Hill and informs Meadows that the NCS suspect that Manson has ensured the silence of a key witness in a major money laundering trial. Manson's world begins to collapse around his ears when a meeting with the girl is followed by her attempted kidnapping. Already paranoid after discovering a bug in his house and an intruder rummaging through his rubbish, Manson discovers an old informant has framed him after being arrested in possession of a large quantity of cash. Enlisting the help of the informant, who claims he has information on a mole working within NCS, Manson is assaulted when going to meet him. When he awakes he finds his informant dead, his clothes covered in blood and an arrest team standing over him.
29	"The Decoy (Part Two)"	Guest appearance of DS Mickey Webb; Brian Croucher, Lucy Cohu, Lara Cazalet and Dominic Mafham guest star	Rob Knights	Maxwell Young	14 April 2005	303
As Manson is hauled into custody on a murder charge, mutual mistrust begins to brew when Sim and Hunter undercover evidence which suggests that Webb could be the NCS mole. When witness Julie Hemming dies of her injuries, Meadows attempts to lean on jailed kingpin Peter MacGowan in an attempt to drive a wedge between him and his son. Manson pretends to have hard evidence that a corrupt copper is responsible for his predicament – deliberately provoking an attempt on his own life as a way of proving his innocence. NCS admit that they may have a mole, but as Meadows keeps digging, will he discover his old protégé Webb is responsible?
30	"This Will Bother You"	DI Neil Manson returns from leave, DI Rowanne Morell ends secondment and is promoted to DCI	Sven Arstein	Emma Goodwin	20 April 2005	304
Smithy and Hemmingway attend the scene of a fight in a café, but the victim fails to give a reason behind the attack. Stamp and Hollis find the car used by the attacker and uncover a number of stolen credit cards, which leads Nixon and Perkins to uncover an illegal snake-smuggling operation, and Perkins to come face to face with an Indian Cobra. Meanwhile, Casper deals with a suicidal man who tries to drive his car into the river. An unsteady DeCosta makes a complete mockery of the case, including crashing her car on the way to a call out. Convinced that Barnes has been stalking her, DeCosta confronts her, only for a tussle to lead to Barnes taking a tumble down a flight of stairs.
31	"No Good Advice"	Jo Woodcock guest stars	Sven Arstein	Steve Trafford	21 April 2005	305
Valentine and DeCosta investigate when a shop owner is attacked, but discover that the attacker may be their most unexpected suspect. Meanwhile, Best and Nixon investigate the alleged rape of a 13-year-old girl, and discover that she lied about her age. The girl finally admits that she wasn't raped, and Best advises the accused to confess to sex with a minor. However, his actions have an entirely unexpected outcome when it discovers that owing to the fact the girl was only 12 when they first had sex, the accused will be charged with statutory rape and faces a life sentence. Meanwhile, station cleaner Barnes continues to play mind games with Ramani following the events of her hospitalisation.
32	"Show of Force"	—	Diana Patrick	Andrew Taft	27 April 2005	306
Casper and Johannsen investigate a squabble at a local auction house over a dodgy video games console; however, their day turns from bad to worse when Gold decides to join them on the beat in an attempt to quell suspicion. The trio soon discover that the auction house has received shipment of a batch of stolen camcorders, but as they try to arrest their three prime suspects, Gold is caught on the receiving end of an assault. Meanwhile, witness Serena Richards is beaten and robbed in the street, with Powell and Murphy are convinced that her best friend Charleyne had something to do with it. Meanwhile, Powell attempts to secure some incriminating evidence against gangster Adi Mateen.
32a	"On the Front Line"	Fourth of four "Uncovered" documentaries	Henry Klejdys	Julie Hill	27 April 2005	TBA
Supt Okaro reminisces about events of the past ten years of life at Sun Hill. Over a bottle of scotch, he recalls events including the two Sun Hill fires, which together claimed the lives of nine officers; the subsequent capture and death of Des Taviner at the hands of a mental prisoner; the death of Kerry Young after being shot by killer cop Gabriel Kent; a fire at June Auckland's flat in 1995, which was the result of a stalker who had been following her over the outcome of a case; and his own first day at Sun Hill, where he saved a young girl from the clutches of a drug dealer's rival and became embroiled in a war between rival dealers.
33	"Like Father, Like Son"	Zienia Merton guest stars	Diana Patrick	Dawn Harrison	28 April 2005	307
Kent and Murphy investigate a dispute between a football manager and the father of one of his players. The dispute soon turns into burglary and assault, but Kent soon realises that the person most in danger is the manager's son, whose craving for his father's attention leads to an armed showdown. Meanwhile, Hunter's meddling in Harman's affairs leads to Greg Campbell finding out the location of her wedding, and him bursting into the registry office during the ceremony ends with Scott Burnett getting assaulted. Smithy and Powell attend the scene of a fatal RTA, where one child has died and a woman and child are injured, only to discover that the victims are Okaro's family.
34	"A Lack of Control (Part One)"	PC Roger Valentine returns to uniform; Janet Dibley guest stars	Sylvie Boden	Harold Jordan	4 May 2005	308
Okaro reels following the fatal crash that wiped out his wife and children. Continually forcing his way into the case, he goes off the deep end and confronts the driver of the other car at her home. Elsewhere, Sim takes on a complex case of a recently released child abuser, but makes an innocent mistake when contacting his daughter, opening a can of worms, which has a tragic outcome. Suspecting that the man's youngest daughter may also have been abused, Sim fights to get the young girl taken into foster care. DeCosta asks Perkins to do a little private investigating to see whether he can gather any incriminating information on unstable station cleaner Margaret Barnes. After the reopening of the front end of Sun Hill, Hollis apologises to JT after not welcoming him out of his grief for Chambers.
35	"A Lack of Control (Part Two)"	Janet Dibley guest stars	Sylvie Boden	Matthew Leys	5 May 2005	309
Okaro's grief leads him to angrily confront the other driver in the crash that killed his family; however, he calms enough to talk her through the incident. His anger reignites when he discovers she fell asleep at the wheel, forcing Gold, Stamp and Valentine to step in. Sim begins to have doubts about continuing her investigation into the child abuse case following the death of one of the suspected victims. However, as social services begin to play ball, Manson convinces her to trust her instincts and continue in her fight to get the other possible victim to safety. DeCosta tries to convince Perkins that Margaret Barnes has been stalking her, but the day ends in an unexpected fashion when DeCosta is arrested by officers from Barton Street on a harassment charge.
36	"Silence of the Guilty"	—	Jim Leach	Malcolm Campbell	12 May 2005	310
Masters and Best continue the investigation into dealer Bernie Cryan, and find that a young lad from the local estate, who may be one of Cryan's dealers, may finally be their way in to nail him. However, Bryant, having known the boy and his mother in the past, finds a totally different angle on the investigation. Perkins pursuit of Margaret Barnes leaves him in grave danger when she attempts to commit suicide leads, only for the unhinged cleaner to stab him as he tries to help her. When Barnes turns up at the station, DeCosta tries to find out exactly what has happened. Meanwhile, Stamp and Casper try to track down an inventive graffiti artist who uses cleaning products to produce negative images on dirty walls.
37	"Through the Facade"	Final appearance of CSSC Margaret Barnes	Jim Leach	Isabelle Grey	18 May 2005	311
As DeCosta accompanies Barnes to hospital, Austin reveals the blood is not all hers. DeCosta is grateful when she tracks down Barnes' estranged husband Chris, but when he reveals Perkins was headed to DeCosta's house and the photos in Barnes' house, DeCosta races to her home and finds her best friend bleeding out on the bathroom floor. Elsewhere, as Masters and Best's op begins to snowball, Powell and Bryant's fears for the safety of Jordan Tomlin escalate when they find his mother beaten, only to discover he was the one responsible. However, when they manage to track him down, they eyeball what could possibly be a drug deal taking place between Okaro and gangster Adi Mateen. After discovering Kate Maltby is expecting his child, Hunter ends up unleashing his anger on a suspect in a case where a frightened young woman found lewd photos on her camera, leading him to tell the man's boss, getting him fired in the process.
38	"Sacrifices of the Job"	—	Martin Hutchings	Kathrine Smith	19 May 2005	312
Okaro attends the funeral of his wife and children, but the day goes from bad to worse when Gold lets slip her cancer diagnosis. Masters and Best covertly attempt to gain more information on dealer Lewis Mackenzie; however, Masters manages to get caught out during a search of his shed, forcing Best to abort surveillance and run to her rescue. Meanwhile, Powell and Bryant continue to try to keep Jordan Tomlin out of harm's way, but are forced to accept that the wayward teenager may be out of all control, and Powell continues to suspect a grieving Okaro after discovering that he hasn't logged the package he received from dealer Adi Mateen. Hunter and Nixon's investigation into the theft of a laptop leads to a blackmail scam related to sexually explicit material on the stolen laptop.
39	"Rise and Fall"	—	Martin Hutchings	Tony McHale	26 May 2005	313
Meadows' investigation into dealer Lewis McKenzie seems to be turning up more fancy women and children than evidence, but manages to gain sufficient ground when one of his girlfriends exposes his sinister dealings. However, Meadows soon realises that McKenzie isn't top dog, and offers him a deal to name names. Meanwhile, Powell continues to pursue Jordan Tomlin after his mother reports that he has stolen from the family home to fund his drug-dealing habit. However, when Tomlin produces a gun, drug dealer Adi Mateen is forced to reveal his true identity in a desperate bid to save Powell from being shot.
40	"Maintain Cover"	First appearance of DRO Rochelle Barratt	David Innes Edwards	Graham Mitchell	1 June 2005	314
Adi Mateen manages to wrestle the gun from the hands of Jordan Tomlin, but suspects that his cover may have been blown. However, when Stamp and Johannsen pick Tomlin up a short while later, Tomlin assures them that he hasn't told anyone about the undercover cop's true identity. Okaro introduces him as DC Zain Nadir and authorises him to continue in his undercover role to meet with major dealer Joshua Armstrong; shortly before the deal is about to go down, Powell discovers that Tomlin was lying and did inform Armstrong of Nadir's identity. Meanwhile, Harman and Hemmingway investigate a storage unit leased by Scott, only for Hemmingway to uncover vital evidence linking Scott to the murder of his former wife, Karen.
41	"Regrets"	Sheridan Smith and Rebecca Atkinson guest star	David Innes Edwards	Roy Boulter	2 June 2005	315
Johannsen and Casper are called to the scene of a catfight between two students after one accuses the other of sleeping with her boyfriend. However, the case soon escalates when the girl accuses the boy of rape. Casper's day goes from bad to worse when he confronts a group of yobs in an unroadworthy van, and they make off with his cap. Johannsen, in an attempt to save face, makes out that Casper was confronted with a knife. Meanwhile, tests on the glove found by Hemmingway all but prove that Scott was responsible for his wife's murder. Unable to console herself, Harman confronts him with the evidence, but Scott makes an unexpected move by suggesting that the pair go on the run together.
42	"The Price of Love"	—	Julie Edwards	Christopher Reason	8 June 2005	316
Best, convinced that Harman would not have absconded with Scott of her own accord, convinces Morrell to investigate her disappearance as an abduction. However, Best little suspects that Harman has fled of her own volition and is preparing to set sail for France. As Scott blurts out that he killed his former wife Karen, Harman finally comes to the realisation that she is trapped with a murderer. Hemmingway is livid when she and Stamp catch a youth stealing flowers from a local graveyard, including from the grave of Hemmingway's late friend Shirley Moss. However, she takes pity on the boy convince him to grass on his own cousin, but his nerves blow the operation and lead to devastating consequences.
43	"Attack of Conscience"	—	Julie Edwards	Simon Moss	9 June 2005	317
Hemmingway reels from her scuffle with Lee Thomas. As the teen lies injured in hospital, the stunned PC accidentally unleashes her anger on Thomas' grieving mother. Things only get worse for Hemmingway when Thomas dies. Stamp then drops Hemmingway in it by mentioning Thomas' theft of flowers from Shirley Moss' grave. Elsewhere, Casper and Kapoor attend a domestic dispute in a restaurant that leads Hunter and Sim to a blackmail scam, but they discover one of the victims may also be a criminal. Meanwhile, Okaro grills Harman over her elopement with Scott Burnett and questions whether she is still up to the job. Also, Smithy reads Johannsen the riot act after he discovers she created the bogus knife claim made by Casper, as well as revealing to JT that Gold has cancer, leading to the entire station finding out.
44	"Use of Protocol (Part One)"	Final appearance of Scott Burnett; Debbie Chazen and Justin Pickett guest star	Nic Phillips	Steve Griffiths	15 June 2005	318
Former undercover officer Zain Nadir agrees to a stint with Sun Hill CID to wrap up the investigation into Joshua Armstrong. He and Perkins begin an operation to nab local dealers to work their way up the food chain. Nadir manipulates one of his old friends into revealing the location of Armstrong's drug-making factory. Meanwhile, Stamp and Kapoor deal with a market trader selling counterfeit goods, but he responds to his arrest by making a false allegation of assault against Kapoor. Hemmingway is suspended from duty following the death of Lee Thomas, which has a knock-on effect when Tony confronts a group of crackheads, seizing their rocks – and finds himself on the receiving end of a savage beating. Meanwhile, Harman visits ex-husband Scott in jail, but later receives devastating news about him.
45	"Use of Protocol (Part Two)"	—	Nic Phillips	Ming Ho	16 June 2005	319
Casper and Valentine attempt to track down Stamp's attackers, but suspicion is rife amongst the relief that Stamp may have been frightened to defend himself following Yvonne's suspension. When Valentine and Kent corner one of the attackers, Valentine is forced to use his CS Spray, but is reprimanded by Okaro for doing so. Ackland decides that enough is enough, and leads strike action for the relief, demanding that Okaro clarifies where they stand on the use of equipment. Meanwhile, having arrested sidekick Damon Kerr, Nadir is determined to nail the top dog, and takes an unsuspecting Powell on an undercover mission. However, their meddling soon finds them being held at gunpoint by Armstrong.
46	"Use of Protocol (Part Three)"	Vilma Hollingbery and Norman Lovett guest star	Alan Macmillan	David Robertson	22 June 2005	320
Ackland leads a short-lived rebellion over the suspension of Hemmingway, but in an attempt to defuse the situation, Okaro agrees to let her return to the station on non-operational duties while the investigation into Lee Thomas' death continues. Meanwhile, Best and Sim investigate a number of robberies, but despite being asked to take the lead, Best feels he is being patronized and begins to develop a strong opinion about his partner. Casper panics when he receives another letter alluding to his affair with Rochelle Barratt, but is upset when she suggests that they put their affair on hold. The Hunter brothers clash over Phil's treatment of Kate Maltby.
47	"One Step Too Far (Part One)"	Philip Martin Brown guest stars	Alan Macmillan	Mark Johnson	23 June 2005	321
Bryant is surprised when Kent takes a surprisingly compassionate approach when he discovers that her wayward son Liam is being bullied at school, unaware that Kent is determined to track down those responsible and dish out his own brand of justice. Meanwhile, Okaro decides to try to mend relations with the uniform relief by going back out on the beat with Ackland, but when they attend the scene of a road traffic accident, Okaro realises that he may have returned to work too soon. Masters investigates a series of betting shop robberies, but is angered when Nixon goes above her head and tries to approach her very anxious informant. Best lashes out after he is belittled by Sim.
48	"One Step Too Far (Part Two)"	Temporary departure of Laura Bryant as PCSO, return of ex-CPS Lawyer Jonathan Fox; Philip Martin Brown guest stars	Robert Del Maestro	Neil Jones	29 June 2005	322
Bryant decides to take matters into her own hands when she discovers that her son, Liam, is caught up in the middle of a gang involved in dealing drugs on school premises. When Liam later disappears, Kent once again springs to Bryant's aid, and manages to find the boy and convince him to let his mother help. Bryant subsequently decides to take some time out, before attending training college to become a fully-fledged PC. Meanwhile, Masters continues to try to rebuild relations with her informant, and convinces Best to deliver a less-than-subtle apology for giving his name to Nixon. Best is then pressured by Manson into dropping his allegations against Sim. Gold's ex-boyfriend Fox returns and tells her he has been appointed prosecuting council in the trial of Perkins' brother Ben.
49	"A Shoulder to Cry On"	—	Robert Del Maestro	Cyril Hughes	30 June 2005	323
Harman and Johannsen investigate a criminal damage incident involving the residence of an escort. CCTV images clearly show one of her regular customers in the area at the time of a previous incident, but he claims not to be involved with the latest campaign of intimidation. However, the pair are not convinced of his innocence and decide to dig a little deeper to see if they can catch him out. Meanwhile, Nadir investigates when a fourteen-year-old girl disappears after claiming to have met a new boyfriend on the internet. However, concern arises when background checks reveal that the 'boy' is in fact a thirty-five-year-old man posing as a youngster in an attempt to trap young girls.
50	"Word to the Wise"	First appearance of Louise Larson	David Holroyd	Jonathan Rich	6 July 2005	324
Smith is called to the scene of a car-jacking, where he finds the reluctant victim, Louise Larson, who initially refuses to pursue the incident. After some gentle persuasion, the pair decide to drive around to see if they can spot the men responsible – but as Smith confronts the two knife-wielding thieves, the situation spirals out of control. As Smith and Louise get close, Nadir discovers she is married to major villain Pete Larson. Meanwhile, Hunter and Nadir investigate a cash machine scam involving a number of 'skimmers' – and decide to mount an undercover operation to catch the thieves in the act. With Harman and Johannsen roped in as backup, the operation goes off without a hitch, despite Hunter re-deploying Harman to collect a birthday cake for his daughter Madison on his behalf. He is subsequently devastated when Christine Weaver tells him she is moving to Australia and taking Madison with her.
51	"Playing With Fire"	Elizabeth Bennett guest stars	David Holroyd	Cris Cole	7 July 2005	325
Valentine and Casper have an eventful first day on patrol as beat officers at Hambilton Green Comprehensive School when they find that a young pupil has been stabbed. Despite their initial misgivings, they discover the two boys involved used to be best friends, but soon realise that the attacker's father may have had a part to play in his son's response to the situation. Meanwhile, Nadir invites Louise Larson to look at a number of mug shots in an attempt to identify her attackers, but Louise refuses to play ball, leading Nadir to realise that something is going on between her and Smith. Perkins plucks up the courage to face his brother as he is called to give evidence against him.
52	"Dangerous Relationships"	Elizabeth Bennett and Anita Dobson guest star	Dermot Boyd	Stuart Morris	13 July 2005	326
Perkins is in court for the outcome of his brother Ben's trial, but the situation takes an unexpected turn, when following days of pleading his innocence, Ben decides to change his plea to guilty – an outcome which promises to have a devastating long-term effect on the entire family. Meanwhile, Hunter finds himself caught between a rock and a hard place – his mum Lynne turns up at the station, determined to make him see sense and support Kate and their new baby. Desperate for a good result, Best throws himself into a case involving a bent car dealer despite Hunter warning him against it.
53	"A Small Price to Pay (Part One)"	—	Dermot Boyd	Nicholas McInerny	14 July 2005	327
Best investigates when a pallet of stolen lamps are found for sale on a stall at the local market. As he and Masters interview the trader, Russell Horwood, they discover a number of fake delivery dockets, which indicate that the lamps were never intended for retail. Later, a number of the lamps are found torched on some nearby wasteground as Horwood drives away in a company van, despite his boss Marty Kenton saying he would fire him. Best and Masters realise they have uncovered a fraud ring and set up a sting, but when an eagle-eyed Stamp discovers traces of white powder inside one of the lamps confiscated during Horwood's arrest, Meadows is unable to stop his raid team walking into an armed siege in time. Meanwhile, Gold's hopes of a reunion with ex-boyfriend Jonathan Fox are knocked when he reveals he is with someone else, and Hunter's attempts to avoid Kate Maltby after his rash proposal are ended when she is robbed at knifepoint.
54	"A Small Price to Pay (Part Two)"	Final appearances of DC Gary Best and Jonathan Fox	Michael Cocker	Harold Jordan	20 July 2005	328
Best is taken to hospital after being shot by Martie Kenton, and after reuniting with his estranged mother, he decides to transfer back to Manchester to be with his family. Meadows and Manson interview area manager Ray Masden, who claims to have had no idea that Kenton had been using his business as a front for importing drugs. However, when he is later stopped trying to leave the country, customs find him in possession of £30,000 and 3kg of cocaine. When Masden fails to provide the name of his supplier, Meadows is convinced that Isaac Collins has been running the operation, and clashes with Okaro when he refuses to provide a budget for a surveillance operation on his oldest friend. Meanwhile, Fox and Smithy find Gold unconscious on her bathroom floor, but despite their concerns, Gina tells them to leave, and tells Fox not to visit her again out of her jealousy of his new girlfriend.
55	"A Small Price to Pay (Part Three)"	First appearance of Ch Supt Ian Barratt; temporary departure of Supt Adam Okaro; Charlie Clements guest stars	Michael Cocker	Jake Riddell	21 July 2005	329
Okaro tenders his resignation as photographs of him smoking a joint with Isaac Collins are passed on to the MET. However, unbeknown to the relief, his resignation is part of an elaborate cover story to disguise the fact that he has secretly gone undercover to gather evidence against Collins. When Collins offers him the job of security manager, Okaro uses the opportunity to fool a less than alert security guard into handing over a swipe card for Collins' private office. However, just as he is on the verge of nailing Collins and locating gunman Martie Kenton, Collins susses that he has been played and decides to exact a frightening campaign of revenge on his former com-padre.
56	"Closing Ranks"	Leonard Fenton and Jack O'Connell guest star	Sylvie Boden	Simon Sharkey	27 July 2005	330
Valentine and Casper investigate when a teacher is assaulted by one of her pupils. In interview, the boy claims that the assault was in self-defence and that the teacher attacked him first. Valentine is convinced that the story is false, but it is Casper who manages to win the boy's trust to coax him into telling the truth. Meanwhile, Kent and Murphy attend the scene of a racially motivated arson attack on an elderly Jewish man. Initially suspecting that the case may be related to the Asian unrest in the area, Perkins later discovers that a dispute with a property developer may have been the catalyst in an attempt to get the man, who is the last sitting tenant, to move out of the property. Meadows reluctantly promotes Manson to Acting DCI after questioning his relationship with Sim, and when DeCosta is made Acting DI, she suggests renaming VPU back to CSU after a victim becomes offended at being labelled vulnerable.
57	"To Catch A Killer (Part One)"	Hywel Bennett guest stars	Sylvie Boden	David Fox	28 July 2005	331
Uniform investigate two relatively routine incidents – Powell and Casper attend when a fight between a prostitute and a punter boils over, and Murphy and Kent attend when a shop display is trashed in the midst of an argument. However, they soon discover that the two incidents could be connected when a woman reports her daughter, Manisha, a nurse at St. Hughs, missing when she fails to return home from work. Convinced that the man involved in the initial incident, Brian Spencer, may have abducted Manisha as revenge for breaking up the fight between himself and the prostitute, Nixon reviews nearby CCTV footage, only to find Peter Baxter in the vicinity of the disappearance.
58	"To Catch A Killer (Part Two)"	Hywel Bennett, Sarah Woodward and Paul Antony-Barber guest star	Lawrence Moody	Graham Mitchell	3 August 2005	332
Smith is called to the scene of an arson attack inside the remains of a derelict cinema, but soon discovers the body of a badly burnt victim inside, which is soon identified as that of missing nurse Manisha. Morrell takes over the investigation and immediately places Peter Baxter in the frame. However, with very little evidence to prove any form of guilt, Morrell and Nixon realises that his knowledge of the local area may prove useful in finding the killer. Meanwhile, new CCTV footage discovers that Manisha did not board the bus that the previous CCTV indicated, and that she hailed down a nearby cab. However, before Nixon can warn De Costa, she already finds herself in the back of the suspect's cab.
59	"To Catch A Killer (Part Three)"	Hywel Bennett, Sarah Woodward, Amelda Brown and Jack O'Connell guest star	Lawrence Moody	Graham Mitchell	4 August 2005	333
Nixon and Nadir manage to track down De Costa before she can come to harm at the hands of suspect taxi driver David Russo. However, Morrell has no choice but to release Russo on bail when DNA tests fail to prove that he was responsible for the murder. Meanwhile, a second employee at St. Hugh's is reported missing by her husband. A subsequent search of Russo's garden uncovers a pile of equipment used for building incendiary devices – but not all of the devices have been located. Nixon does a deal with Peter Baxter, agreeing to speak to one of his former victims in return for information on local consecrated buildings where the second missing victim could be being held. Meanwhile, Ackland and Valentine hunt down tear away Ross Trescot, but Ackland finds herself the victim of a vicious attack when she corners him.
60	"Mad Dogs"	Jack O'Connell and Jane Cameron guest star	Robert Bierman	Emma Goodwin	10 August 2005	334
Ackland is forced to relive the events of her rape at the hands of schoolboy tearaway Ross Trescot. As the team go all out to track Trescot down, Kent is forced to restrain himself when he finally catches with up the boy on a nearby industrial estate. When he and Sim interview the boy, he claims to have been abused as a child by his uncle and also claims that Ackland consented to have sex with him. Meanwhile, Hunter finds himself investigating a dead-end-case when his brother and Powell attend the report of a burglary at the home of a pair of recently married city slickers, which turns out to be a practical joke. But he soon has bigger problems after admitting to fiancée Kate that he is still married to his estranged wife Cindy, a revelation that sends her into his brother's arms.
61	"At the End of a Long Day"	Final appearance of Christine Weaver; Hannah Tointon guest stars	Robert Bierman	Ben Cooper	11 August 2005	335
Casper and Valentine investigate when a schoolgirl is reported missing by her best friend. Although the girl's mother initially fails to see any concern, a voicemail message left on her friend's phone soon indicates that something may be seriously wrong. As the search continues, the pair later find the girl deep inside a wooded common, only to discover that she has just given birth – but there is no sign of the baby. Meanwhile, Hunter and Masters keep track of a stolen van they suspect has been involved in a robbery. When Hunter spots one of his former informants, he trails him and finds himself walking straight into the middle of a drugs bust being co-ordinated by customs.
62	"Beggars and Bent Coppers"	First appearance of Supt Amanda Prosser; return of Cindy Hunter	David Innes Edwards	Jonte Henderson	17 August 2005	336
New Superintendent Amanda Prosser arrives to take charge at Sun Hill. Hunter and Masters believe they have enough evidence to prove that corrupt customs officer Clive Darlow is involved in a high-level drugs scam, and set up an operation in an attempt to catch him red-handed. Meanwhile, Ackland and Kapoor investigate when a young woman is found unconscious in the street with injuries, which suggest she has been the victim of date rape, and a suspect for the attack is soon identified – but Ackland isn't convinced that the suspect's story is entirely feasible. Nadir tries to catch a thief running loose in a hotel, but stumbles upon Smithy in the arms of Louise Larson.
63	"Loss of Inhabitation"	—	David Innes Edwards	Maxwell Young	18 August 2005	337
Harman and Johannsen go undercover when a further two date-rape victims are linked to the same nightclub. Murphy and Casper manage to prevent a third attack, but the victim fails to pick out her attacker. When Harman manages to identify a possible suspect, Johannsen decides to go for glory and tries to catch the attacker red-handed. Meanwhile, Smithy arrests a young boy for theft. He claims that he is trying to repay a debt owed to money lender Dennis Frost, and claims to have evidence to prove that Frost has been involved in dealing in counterfeit jewellery. However, the boy soon regrets being co-operative when he has two of his fingers chopped off for his trouble. Meanwhile, Hunter ends his engagement to Kate Maltby after learning that she has slept with his brother, who he secretly beats up.
64	"Trial Basis (Part One)"	Return of now-PC Laura Bryant; Karen Westwood, Cathy Tyson, Paul Brooke and Tim Preece guest star	Christopher King	Malcolm Campbell	24 August 2005	338
Murphy investigates when a charity collection is stolen from a mother trying to raise funds to send her sick daughter on holiday, but soon has suspicions of her own when she notices the mother giving the girl self-prescribed heavy sedatives. Murphy suspects that the young girl does not have cancer as the mother claims, but struggles to find any evidence to prove her theory. Perkins deals with a man who claims his daughter has been stealing from him, but a search of her vehicle uncovers something unexpected – a stash of drugs, which she claims belongs to Benjamin Meadows. Meanwhile, the trial into the death of Lee Thomas gets underway, but Hemmingway isn't hopeful of her chances.
65	"Without Force (Part Two)"	Paul Brooke, Cathy Tyson and Karen Westwood guest star	Christopher King	Steve Griffiths	25 August 2005	339
Murphy's suspicions prove to be correct when the team discover that the girl's supposed port for chemotherapy does not exist. Under interrogation, her mother breaks and reveals that she has been faking the girl's illness. Nixon and Perkins set up a surveillance operation on the supposed 'Grab-A-Gram' outfit, and trail one of the runners back to Benjamin Meadows' flat, but he denies any involvement in the operation. Meanwhile, at the trial of Lee Thomas, Yvonne's fate looks all but sealed, until Stamp discovers that a homeless man who tried to burst into the court is a vital witness to the case, who can corroborate Hemmingway's version of events leading up to the fatal blow.
66	"Credit Where Credit's Due"	Ayesha Antoine guest stars	Mike Adams	Isabelle Grey	30 August 2005	340
Meadows discovers that his son Benjamin is the mastermind behind the 'grab-a-gram' outfit, but a search of his flat fails to uncover any conclusive evidence. However, a lack of personal documents leads Meadows to suspect that his son may be occupying a second property – and raid uncovers a substantial amount of cocaine. In interview, he decides to take a lenient approach in return for information on Benjamin's main suppliers. Meanwhile, Johannsen is tasked with telling a mother that her son has died – but unknowingly breaks the news to the wrong woman, after a fake passport is found in possession of the victim. However, this gives Manson a major lead on a fake passport ring.
67	"The Boys are Back in Town"	Lucy Cohu, Neil Newbon and Graham McTavish guest star	Mike Adams	Richard Ommanney	31 August 2005	341
Kent and Hollis investigate an armed robbery on a jewellers, with assistance from Murphy's daughter, who is spending a day's work experience with the team. When they discover that the weapon used was in fact a water pistol, and the jewellery that was stolen is fake, they uncover that the jeweller's brother was responsible for the death of the robber's family. Meanwhile, Nadir and Hunter investigate the production of fake passports, and discover a link between Pete Larson and the owner of the print works where the passports are being produced. However, despite facing a lengthy jail sentence, the man refuses to co-operate with them or implicate Larson in any way, shape or form.
68	"Insufficient Excuses"	Zelda Tinska, Lucy Cohu, Neil Newbon, Ivana Bašić and Jack O'Connell guest star	Julie Edwards	Tom Needham (uncredited)	1 September 2005	342
Masters and Sim investigate when the flat of a man suspected of pimping is trashed the day after he appears in court. After initially barking up the wrong tree, the pair are handed information on a massage parlour supposedly trading in young boys – but an organised raid fails to yield any vital evidence. Later, as the pair trail the defendant, they are surprised to find him meeting up with Manson's father-in-law, Roy Pearson. Meanwhile, Kapoor and Johannsen are dismissive when tracking down a drunken man wielding a plastic sword, but soon discover that he is the prime suspect in an assault on a former prostitute and her flatmate, which is being investigated by Valentine and Bryant.
69	"Finger of Blame"	Lucy Cohu, Neil Newbon, Josef Altin and Ben Price guest star	Julie Edwards	Simon Moss	6 September 2005	343
Manson discovers that his wife, Philippa, was aware that her father was staying in London, and accuses her of throwing the court case to get suspected pimp Gavin Sullivan set free as a favour for him. Masters and Sim discover that Sullivan has an incriminating tape of Pearson having sex with an underage boy, and that Pearson is frantically trying to retrieve it – but a confrontation between Pearson and Sullivan ends in tragedy. Meanwhile, Hunter and Nixon deal with the disappearance of a young estate agent who failed to turn up to work the night after splitting up from his girlfriend. They soon discover the man's body in one of the company apartments, having supposedly committed suicide.
70	"Distraction"	Final appearance of ex-DAC Roy Pearson; temporary departure of DI Neil Manson; Terence Beesley, Lucy Cohu, Neil Newbon and Cherylee Houston guest star	Menhaj Huda	Andrew Taft	7 September 2005	344
Masters and Sim interview Gavin Sullivan in relation to Roy Pearson's stabbing, but the charge soon escalates to murder when Pearson dies in hospital. De Costa and Perkins investigate a campaign of harassment involving two neighbours, but soon come to agree that a mutual apology is the best way forward. Meanwhile, the relief have a wager on who can make the best arrest of the day. Hemmingway and Bryant pursue a gang of robbers who burgle their victim's homes after attacking them in the street, while Valentine and Casper investigate the theft of DJ equipment and CDs from a pub entertainer. With both teams making successful arrests, Gold treats them to a quiet round in the pub.
71	"The Scapegoat"	Final episode produced by Paul Marquess; John Nettleton, William Lucas and Graham McTavish guest star	Menhaj Huda	Tom Higgins	8 September 2005	345
Gold, Casper and Hollis attend the scene when an elderly man with dementia tries to break into the home where he previously lived for many years. They manage to calm the situation until the man later absconds once more, this time in possession of a loaded gun. With Gold uncontactable, Prosser leads an armed raid, only to find that she has stormed the wrong house. When Barratt reads both managers the riot act, Prosser uses her clash with Gold to make her a scapegoat. Meanwhile, Nixon and Nadir investigate a former associate of Pete Larson who has decided to go solo, and continue in the fake passport business. When Nadir goes undercover to buy a fake passport, he arrives at the planned meet to find the man dead in the back of his car with a bullet through the front of the head.
72	"Mixing Business With Pleasure"	First episode produced by Johnathan Young; Ivana Bašić and Pauline Quirke guest star	Nic Phillips	Julian Unthank	14 September 2005	346
Masters is assigned as contact officer for a notorious child killer, Cath Wilson, who has been released after spending twenty years in prison and is being rehabilitated under the new identity of Lesley Palmer. However, her situation is immediately compromised after she allows a former cellmate to stay at her safe house, and is then arrested after shoplifting from a local newsagents. Meanwhile, Perkins and DeCosta deal with a Polish ambassador who has been assaulted outside a clip joint. The only witness to the incident refuses to talk, until Valentine recognises her and persuades her to make a statement. Murphy's suspicions about Kent begin to grow when she and Bryant deal with an assault victim, only to discover that she is one of his old flames; when she confronts him, he stuns her by proposing to her.
73	"Seeking Retribution"	Ivana Bašić and Michael Praed guest star	Nic Phillips	Adrian Pagan	15 September 2005	347
Valentine investigates an assault on the boyfriend and business partner of his estranged wife Sandra, but is puzzled when CCTV pulled from a street camera fails to back-up his version of events. When he reveals that he is being pressured by a loanshark into paying money for protection, Nadir sets up an operation to catch the offender in the act. Meanwhile, Hollis and Kent deal with a spate of criminal damage on family cars, and suspect a recently widowed elderly man who is being targeted by local youths. While on suspension, Gold makes a citizen's arrest on a woman she suspects of dealing drugs, but Powell and Murphy fail to find any incriminating evidence. After thinking it over, Murphy accepts Kent's proposal, much to Ackland's dismay.
74	"The Anniversary (Part One)"	Return of Supt Adam Okaro; Stuart Laing, James Barriscale and George Sewell guest star	Nic Phillips	Jonathan Rich	21 September 2005	348
Valentine investigates a road traffic accident involving an eight-year-old boy, and is devastated to have to inform the father when the boy subsequently dies of his injuries. Although having been at the wheel of a stolen car, forensics confirms that the driver was not above the speed limit and was driving safely – news, which the young boy's father doesn't take too well. When Prosser angers the father with her handling of the situation, she finds herself in grave danger. Meanwhile, with Sun Hill's fiftieth anniversary looming on the horizon, Hollis is putting into place last minute preparations for a celebratory party, including inviting a guest speaker, former DCS Charles Barnet, to compere the night. However, while out on patrol with Stamp and Powell, Barnet suffers an injury while making an arrest. Kent is horrified when his brother, the real Gabriel Kent, arrives at Sun Hill to see Ackland.
75	"The Anniversary (Part Two)"	Final appearance of Supt Amanda Prosser; temporary departure of Insp Gina Gold; Stuart Laing and James Barriscale guest star	Sylvie Boden	Graham Mitchell	22 September 2005	349
Live episode. As Kent tries to stop his brother rumbling his identify theft, they catch grieving father Jeff Clarke holding Prosser at gunpoint, and soon find themselves taken hostage as well. As Nadir, Perkins and Masters give tours of the station they get drawn into it too, but Casper's arrival allows Prosser to alert CAD of the situation. When she rashly suggests Casper tries taking on the gunman, Casper and the real Gabriel end up getting shot. Perkins is left alone with Clarke and Casper, and, after arranging an exit for his wounded colleague, he tries talking Clarke down, but is horrified to discover he has abducted the joyrider who killed his son and has him in the boot of his car – which is wired with explosives.
76	"Keep it Out"	Pauline Quirke, Julie Legrand and Dhaffer L'Abidine guest star	Alan Macmillan	David Robertson	28 September 2005	350
After reassuming charge of the station, Okaro asks Masters to investigate when the local press manage to capture a photo of Lesley Palmer. Masters suspects that Palmer's former cellmate, Fi Dodds, may be responsible for the leak, and when confronted, she reveals that she has also leaked information as to Palmer's whereabouts. When a group of journalists and angry protesters arrive on her doorstep, Palmer disappears. Meanwhile, Nixon investigates when a stash of recalled antibiotics almost causes a man's death after making their way onto the streets of Sun Hill, and uncovers a dangerous rivalry between two neighbours who are both fighting to be king of their patch. Bryant informs Smithy that the man shot in the siege told her his name was Gabriel Kent, and they begin to question how likely it is when PC Kent threatens Bryant to keep quiet.
77	"A Not-So-Simple Mistake"	Pauline Quirke, Julie Legrand and James Barriscale guest star	Alan Macmillan	Steve Trafford	29 September 2005	351
Masters approaches Fi Dodds for information on Lesley Palmer's whereabouts, in the hope that she can track her down before she makes a big mistake. Nixon discovers that Palmer has set a trap for her former lover and co-conspirator, Stuart Jensen, by sending a number of false e-mails in an attempt to lure him to Oxfordshire. When they arrive, Masters finds Palmer holding Jensen at knifepoint, hoping he will reveal the location of the body of the second child that he murdered. Hunter and Perkins investigate when businessman Richard Neaman is found dead in his own bed, but their initial suspicions of sudden death are proven wrong when a post mortem reveals that he was suffocated. Ackland instructs Bryant to find front office CCTV footage of the shooting victim, and when she tells Smithy, they decide to tell Ackland the man might be her son.
78	"Let it Slip"	—	Robert Bierman	Neil Jones	5 October 2005	352
Devastated about her son's hospitalisation, Ackland decides to come clean about Kent's false identity, but Smithy persuades her to leave it and instead try to bring him down another way. Feeling the net is closing in, Kent suggests to Murphy they elope, but Bryant lets it slip that Kent is an impostor when Murphy says she wants to leave Sun Hill with her fiancé. Perkins and Hunter's personal lives clash with the job when their partners are caught up in crimes; Perkins' girlfriend Lucy is assaulted and the attacker references Ben, who is later investigated for stabbing a cell mate in prison. Meanwhile, Hunter gets in wife Cindy's bad books when he investigates one of her employees for the theft of a sunglasses shipment.
79	"Cat Out of the Bag"	Final appearance of PC Gabriel Kent; James Barriscale and Linette Beaumont guest star	Robert Bierman	Jake Riddell	6 October 2005	353
Murphy finally uncovers the truth about Kent, but before she can raise the alarm, he attacks her and leaves her tied up. Attending an RTC, Kent persuades a victim to make a false claim of whiplash so he can go to St. Hugh's, where he tries to turn off his brother's life support. Hunter finds Kent's brother in cardiac arrest and raises the alarm, with Smith and Nixon arranging a team to arrest Kent. When he attends a block of flats and sees the team closing in, he drags Ackland to the rooftop for a final showdown. Meanwhile, Powell and Hunter investigate the theft of a car and the disappearance of a family puppy. They arrest a local youth, who has form for committing similar offences with the same motive.
80	"Won't Take it Lying Down"	Frances Lima guest stars	Robert Knights	Maxwell Young	12 October 2005	354
Perkins and Sim arrange a raid on a warehouse suspected of being involved in the trade of stolen car parts, but Hunter junior's lack of urgency with obtaining a warrant leads the team to lose their prime suspect. However, further investigation leads the team to uncover a second location where parts are being traded. Meanwhile, De Costa and Nadir investigate a domestic violence case with a twist, when an interview with the supposed abuser reveals some very interesting information about the victim. Kapoor and Powell deal with an incident of 'happy slapping', involving a number of schoolchildren from the nearby Harvey Wallace school, who push a businessman from his bike into a canal. Barratt orders an inquiry into Kent's death and how his false identity went undiscovered for so long.
81	"Missing in Action"	—	Robert Knights	Mark Johnson	13 October 2005	355
Powell and Kapoor attend a concerning smell call at a block of flats, and they find the severely decomposed body of one of the residents, James Trent, who had not been seen for over six weeks. Masters and Nixon suspect that the dead man's brother, who has been using his credit card since his death, may have been responsible for the attack that killed him. They also investigate a former lover, who left a message on the man's answerphone many weeks after his death – indicating a possible cover up. Nadir and De Costa investigate the disappearance of a young Egyptian girl, who appears to have been taken by her father to see an illegal doctor who performs female circumcision operations.
82	"The Screw (Part One)"	Pauline Quirke guest stars	Sallie Apharamian	Julia Wall	19 October 2005	356
Masters goes undercover in Stonewall private prison in an attempt to eradicate the ongoing problem of drugs getting onto the wing. However, she soon faces opposition from a less than co-operative colleague, Pete Mason, who she believes is harbouring one of the main dealers, Cherry Watkins. Masters uses Lesley Palmer to gather information on one of the more vulnerable inmates, in the hope that she can provide a vital lead. Meanwhile, Nixon investigates the shooting of a young girl on the Ellis estate. The gun used in the shooting is linked to another attack just two months ago, but the situation becomes complicated when the victim is found in possession of live ammunition. Hemmingway discovers Nurse Austin, her ex-boyfriend, hiding the evidence.
83	"The Screw (Part Two)"	Final appearance of Nurse Nick Austin; Pauline Quirke guest stars	Sallie Aphramian	Matthew Leys	20 October 2005	357
Masters manages to work out which of the inmates has contacts on the outside, and soon works out how the next delivery of drugs is going to make its way into the prison, so with the help of Meadows and Sim, arranges a sting to catch the dealers in the act. However, she soon realises that she has been double crossed by Lesley Palmer, who is simply working the situation to her own advantage. Meanwhile, as the investigation into Shanti Das' shooting continues, Nixon tries and gather evidence against prime suspect Dee Winston, and offers Austin a deal – she will drop all charges of withholding evidence against him if he can get Shanti to talk.
84	"A Mean Game (Part One)"	Rob Jarvis and Graham McTavish guest star	Michael Cocker	Tom Higgins	25 October 2005	358
Hollis and Stamp arrest a man, Eddie Evans, for tendering counterfeit money, but Nixon decides to release him in the hope that he leads them to bigger fish. During a surveillance obbo, Evans attends a planned meet with none other than Pete Larson. When questioned, Evans breaks down and reveals Larson was the assailant involved in the shooting of Vince Garrison several months ago. Nadir leads a raid on Larson's house, but despite being ordered to call off the search, Smithy refuses to give up in the hope of finding the gun involved. Meanwhile, Casper and Johannsen are tasked by the BPI to investigate a major piracy operation involving the illegal distribution of fake CDs.
85	"A Mean Game (Part Two)"	Graham McTavish guest stars	Michael Cocker	Scott Cherry	27 October 2005	359
Smithy is held hostage at gunpoint by Pete Larson, who attacks his wife after discovering their illicit affair. After forcing him into the boot of his car, Larson takes Smithy to a disused warehouse, where he confronts him about the affair. Larson decides to put a contract out on his wife's life, forcing Valentine and Hollis to go in search of a dangerous hitman who has disguised himself as a hospital doctor. When a cleaner disturbs Larson in the act, Smithy manages to make good his escape and raise the alarm. However, once in custody, Larson turns the tables and claims that his wife was responsible for the death of Vince Garrison, and that Smithy planted the gun to frame him.
86	"Back to Basics (Part One)"	Return of DS Mickey Webb	David Holroyd	Andrew Alty	2 November 2005	360
Meadows enlists the help of former colleague Webb when rapist Martin Delaney escapes from prison. Webb begins by questioning a prostitute whom Delaney attacked shortly after absconding, but begins to suspect that Delaney's motives for escaping are much less clear cut than he expected, when the pair come face to face – but Delaney ignores the chance to exact his revenge. Meanwhile, Barratt decides to spend a day out on the beat with Casper, and the pair investigate an armed robbery at a money transfer shop. However, seizing his chance, Barratt confronts Casper about his affair with his wife – and the situation comes to an ugly head during a sting to catch the robbers red handed.
87	"Back to Basics (Part Two)"	Final appearances of Ian and Rochelle Barratt; DS Mickey Webb is demoted to DC; Brian Miller guest stars	David Holroyd	Simon Moss	3 November 2005	361
Casper is held at gunpoint by one of the armed robbers, while Barratt makes good his escape. Casper manages to escape from harm, but soon finds himself on the receiving end of the borough commander's left hook, before being informed that Barratt and his wife will be transferring to another borough. Meanwhile, Webb's investigation into Martin Delaney takes an interesting twist when he discovers that his motive for breaking out of prison may have been to move the body of one of his former associates, McGowan, who disappeared two years previously. Meadows uses an interesting interview technique in an attempt to coax Delaney into revealing the location of the body.
88	"In the Wrong Hands"	Return of Insp Gina Gold	David Innes Edwards	Cyril Hughes	9 November 2005	362
Hunter and Masters investigate an armed robbery at an off-licence, but find they have little to no evidence to go on – until Murphy and Bryant arrest a man on a warrant for failure to attend court, only to find that he has a severe gunshot wound from where the gun backfired during the robbery. The pair then manage to identify his accomplice, and are led to an illegal firearms manufacturing operation which soon threatens the life of a young boy. Meanwhile, as the relief go after offenders who have failed to attend court, Casper and Valentine catch up with a particularly violent thug who they have encountered before, but not before he manages to assault and intimidate his own mother.
89	"Decision Time"	Final appearance of PC Sheelagh Murphy; Garfield Morgan and James Barriscale guest star	David Innes Edwards	Ben Cooper	10 November 2005	363
Valentine and Kapoor investigate when a car belonging to a factory owner is set on fire, and discover that the culprit was one of his former employees, who reveals that he has been employing illegal immigrants as cheap labour. Valentine informs one of his old pals at Barton Street, Sergeant Harry Haines, and the pair conduct a raid, only to leave empty handed. Valentine suspects something fishy is going on – and his suspicions are confirmed when Haynes offers him a bribe to keep quiet. Meanwhile, Harman and Johannsen are tasked with accompanying a vulnerable witness to court, but in the process stumble upon a protection racket. Murphy accepts a transfer to the Child Protection Team and Ackland reconciles with her son.
90	"The Reject"	DC Mickey Webb transfers back to Sun Hill	Ken Grieve	John Milne	16 November 2005	364
Webb's first day back at Sun Hill sees him partner a resentful Nadir to investigate an attempted robbery on a bookmaker. Nadir is determined to go it alone and freeze Webb out of the investigation, but the pair find some common ground when they decide to mount an operation to catch the robbers in the act behind Meadows' back, which leads to Webb staring down the barrel of a gun. Meanwhile, Gold and Ackland begin the annual performance reviews on the relief, beginning with Johannsen and Harman respectively. Harman investigates a number of purse thefts where the victims are tagged before they are attacked, while Johannsen clumsily goes about trying to recover some stolen dresses from a market stall.
91	"Crystal Meth Madness"	—	Ken Grieve	Clive Dawson	17 November 2005	365
Powell and Bryant's pursuit of a speeding car leads to an occupant being thrown out with serious burns. Nadir and Webb investigate and discover that the victim may be linked to a crystal meth cook-house that burnt down earlier that day. Powell tries to get a depressed Rollins to attend and investigate, but not only does Rollins refuse, he admits he has scored meth in a club called Radar recently. Powell goes undercover there to trap the co-conspirators involved in the operation. Meanwhile, Perkins and De Costa investigate a street robbery involving a fourteen-year-old boy. They discover that the victim is the new boyfriend of the boy's mother, but soon realise that their initial suspicions are completely off target – and that the boy is exacting revenge for the man turning his mum into a drug dealer.
92	"A Small Piece of the Pie"	Return of DI Neil Manson; Jonathan Watson guest stars	Brett Fallis	David Fox	23 November 2005	366
Hunter is hauled back into the Richard Neaman murder case when fresh evidence reveals that his death may be related to the fact that he was being blackmailed, with Manson returning to Sun Hill on attachment from MIT. They discover that a spurned former lover, Josh Hill, is responsible for Neaman making regular outgoing payments to disguise his infidelity from his wife, but Hunter begins to realise that the case has very similar hallmarks to the murder of James Trent. Meanwhile, uniform try to track down two different sets of thieves. Powell and Bryant tail a man posing as the local vicar, conning his way into the homes of the elderly congregation, while Kapoor and Hollis investigate the theft of four laptops from a school IT department. Powell is crushed when Rollins decides to take a break from their relationship as his depression for killing the abductor from the siege spirals.
93	"When Justice Isn't Enough (Part 1)"	Final appearance of PC Lance Powell; Gareth David-Lloyd guest stars	Brett Fallis	Richard Ommanney	29 November 2005	367
Hunter receives an anonymous phone call which claims that the three murders which he recently investigated are linked. Having already made the connection between Neaman and Trent, he soon realises that the death of a young estate agent which he and Nixon investigated several weeks ago may not have been suicide as they first thought – and that the victim could be the third body related to the killer. Morrell is called in to lead up the investigation. Meanwhile, Powell decides to drown his sorrows after husband Marc's decision to reconsider their relationship, unaware that he is in sight of the killer. When Hunter receives Powell's warrant card in the post, he realises that he could be the next victim.
94	"When Justice Isn't Enough (Part 2)"	Final appearance of Kate Maltby	Gill Wilkinson	Steve Griffiths	30 November 2005	368
Powell's death sends shockwaves through the team. Morrell initially suspects Josh Hill of being involved when CCTV shows him speaking to Powell shortly before the murder, but DNA evidence soon rules him out. Suspicion then falls on barman Michael Keanan, who gave Powell a lift home, but again DNA evidence rules him out. The focus soon switches onto John Lord, whom Manson identifies as the man who tried to interrupt Keanan's initial interview. Hunter manages to connect a further incident previously investigated by Valentine and Kapoor to the killer, where a young man was tied up and bound to his bed, but survived after the attacker was spooked by a phone call.
95	"When Justice Isn't Enough (Part 3)"	Final appearance of DCI Rowanne Morell	Gill Wilkinson	Stuart Morris	7 December 2005	369
Nixon and Valentine stage an obbo on Keanan's flat, while Manson and Webb track down Lord at a home belonging to his former foster mother. With both suspects now in custody, it soon becomes a game of which will break first – and Morrell decides to use an interesting interview technique in an attempt to get Keanan to cough. However, when Lord confesses to Powell's murder, she realises that Lord is harbouring a secret crush on Keanan, and that he is prepared to go to any lengths to prevent Keanan from taking the rap. Deciding to play him at his own game, Morrell invites Keanan into a trap by informing him Lord has confessed to all of the murders, hoping he will take the bait.
96	"Hook, Line and Sinker"	Final appearance of Sgt Marc Rollins; David Gyasi guest stars	Nigel Douglas	Andrew Taft	8 December 2005	370
Valentine and Kapoor find a young boy badly beaten after being the victim of a vicious assault. Later, Okaro, out on patrol with Bryant, catches the boy trying to break into his grandad's house, having been unable to get any answer. Okaro forces entry and finds the man dead, but Bryant realises that the boy is more concerned about a secret stash of drugs hidden under the kitchen sink. Meanwhile, Nadir and Sim investigate an allegation of assault involving a high-flying footballer, but discover that the only witness to the case appears to have a long-standing grudge against the defendant, having protected him from being caught by a rape allegation some two years previously.
97	"Reunited"	First appearance of PC Will Fletcher; Micah Balfour guest stars	Nigel Douglas	Emma Goodwin	14 December 2005	371
Sun Hill's latest recruit, Will Fletcher, is late for his first shift, which leaves an angry Stamp attending the scene of an armed robbery at a jewellers on his own. When door-to-door inquiries throws up recently released street thug Jordan Tomlin as one of the suspects, he denies being involved in the robbery and claims to have been holding the stolen loot for a friend. When Hunter and Masters set up an operation to catch the robbers in the act, they discover Jordan's girlfriend is one of them. Meanwhile, DeCosta and Perkins investigate a case of identity fraud when a homeowner is attacked after discovering that his empty flat, which he has been trying to rent, has been receiving mail in the name of a previous tenant.
98	"Cop the Lot"	Burt Kwouk, Pik-Sen Lim and Alexis Conran guest star	Christopher King	Tom Higgins	15 December 2005	372
Masters and Nixon investigate a car-jacking, and discover that the prime suspect is a well-known offender, Franny Davidson, who is already wanted on warrant for failure to attend court. Lucky for them, he is one of twenty suspects being targeted by Gold's latest undercover operation – a mock game show aimed to trap offenders into thinking they are auditioning for the chance to appear on TV. Meanwhile, Sim is asked by her parents to investigate the theft of items from their house. Sim decides to ask for Webb's assistance to avoid a conflict of interest, but after initially suspecting their long-term cleaner of the crime, Webb discovers a homeless man has been living in their attic.
99	"Torn"	Terry Alderton, John Woodvine, Daniel Hill, Lucy Liemann and Justin Pickett guest star	Christopher King	Jonathan Rich	20 December 2005	373
Nadir's day of reckoning finally arrives when the trial relating to his major undercover operation finally reaches court. After managing to keep nervous witness Chez Williams on side, defendant Damon Kerr looks all but set to go to down – until the trial judge is caught drink driving, which results in him being involved in a hit and run – forcing Okaro to have to arrest him. As the decision is made for a re-trial, things take a drastic turn when Williams is shot while leaving court. Meanwhile, Fletcher and Harman deal with a dozy security guard who believes he has found a car bomb, unaware that they will soon require his help after uncovering a stolen car scam operating from a nearby valet car park.
100	"Honour"	Christmas Special, Blake Ritson and Joe Armstrong guest star	Nic Phillips	Malcolm Campbell	21 December 2005	374
Christmas Eve. De Costa and Perkins investigate an assault after tempers flare following an office Christmas party, but when the defendant claims he was sexually assaulted by his female boss the night before, the pair investigate a subjected campaign of bullying which appears to have taken place prior to the attack. With the defendant denying all knowledge of the attack, Perkins is forced to tow a hard line in an attempt to get her to talk. Meanwhile, Harman and Fletcher encounter a homeless young man who is trying to find a shelter to sleep at over the Christmas holidays, but Fletcher suspects there is more to the case than meets the eye – and discovers the man has a wife and child.
101	"A Time for Giving"	Christmas Special	Nic Phillips	Maxwell Young	22 December 2005	375
Christmas Day. Hunter's peaceful Christmas Day shift is interrupted by an informant who claims he has details of the whereabouts of a large haul of ecstasy. Dragging Masters away from her Christmas dinner, the pair mount an OBBO to catch the dealers in the act – but Hunter isn't best pleased when armed robbers arrive and steal the drugs first. Meanwhile, Hollis finds himself investigating the disappearance of the Three Wise Men after they are stolen by youths from a local church. Perkins' nephew Bradley disappears, and CCTV footage reveals him talking to a known pimp of rent boys at a local bus station, leading Perkins to mount his own personal crusade to find his missing relative.
102	"Without Dignity, Without Respect"	—	Diana Patrick	Damian Wayling	28 December 2005	376
New Year's Eve. Masters and Sim investigate an assault on a city lawyer, and suspect that he may have been involved with the racial baiting of an Asian group trying to give out leaflets to students. Stamp manages to persuade a taxi driver who was witness to the attack to come forward, but then nearly ruins it by questioning his immigration status. As Masters and Sim investigate a former partner in the law firm, she is identified by the taxi driver as the person he saw attacking the victim. Meanwhile, Smith and Kapoor deal with a frustrated man who breaks into his former home, trying to deliver late Christmas presents to his children after his ex-wife refuses him access to see them.
103	"A Social Decision"	Final appearance of PC Amber Johannsen; Harry Lloyd and Denise Black guest star	Diana Patrick	Carolyn Sally Jones	29 December 2005	377
Smith and Sim investigate when a young woman is brutally attacked in her own home by an intruder, but suspect that the attack may have been a case of mistaken identity, and that the intended victim was property developer Joanne Marsden, who has run up a substantial debt with a number of contractors that she has failed to pay for her work. Meanwhile, Hemmingway and Johannsen investigate a dispute involving a shopkeeper to appears to have sold some faulty goods. When the angry customer returns to the shop and steals goods to the value of his faulty purchase, Johannsen misjudges the situation, which ends up with two innocent children being taken and held hostage. After Gold berates her over the incident, Johannsen quits the force.
