= The Anniversary, Part Two =

Episode of The Bill

- The Bill episode
- Episode no.: Series 21; Episode 75
- Directed by: Sylvie Boden
- Written by: Graham Mitchell
- Original air date: 22 September 2005

Episode chronology
← Previous "The Anniversary, Part One"	Next → "Keep it Out"
- The Bill (series 21)

"The Anniversary, Part Two" is an episode of the long-running ITV police-procedural drama series The Bill. The episode is significant in the show's history as it is the second of two episodes broadcast live. The Anniversary, Part 2 was broadcast live on 22 September 2005 at 8:00pm, to commemorate the 50th anniversary of ITV1. The episode was written by Graham Mitchell, directed and co-produced by Sylvie Boden, and produced by Donna Wiffen.

== Prelude storylines ==
- Sun Hill's 50th Anniversary: The basis of the live episode was a celebration organised by PC Reg Hollis to celebrate 50 years of Sun Hill Police Station, to tie in with 50 years of its broadcaster ITV1. The events of the episode before the live one, The Anniversary: Part 1 saw the event planning take place alongside regular policing.
- Gabriel Kent's Villainy: The major plot before and after the live episode is the focus on the show's primary villain, PC Gabriel Kent. Kent joined Sun Hill in the summer of 2003, and slowly developed from a bullying bigot to a serial killer, who committed other crimes such as rape, assault and perjury. It was revealed about a year after his arrival that he was working under an assumed identity; Gabriel Kent was the son of Sun Hill Sergeant June Ackland, and the man claiming to be Gabriel was actually his adoptive brother David. His most notable moments came a year earlier when he shot colleague PC Kerry Young dead after she failed to embark on a relationship, Kent's jealousy over her relationship with PC Cameron Tait resulted in him raping her a few months before she died. Kerry swore revenge when Gabriel goaded Cameron into an assault to force his resignation, and during an argument with Sergeant Ackland, she unintentionally let slip to Kerry that Gabriel was an impostor. Knowing she also had details on his rape of her, Kerry came to the station intent on exposing him before resigning in the wake of her suspension (having been framed for organising an armed robbery with a known criminal). Gabriel watched her arrive at the station before gunning her down with a sniper rifle; dying in the arms of her Sergeant and on-off boyfriend Dale "Smithy" Smith, having just realised their true love for one another, Smithy swore to find whoever was responsible. Suspecting a serial sniper, Smithy was unaware that Gabriel was his partner in crime, which led to Gabriel throwing the sniper off a balcony to his death before he could be arrested. The pieces were put together by undercover journalist PC Andrea Dunbar, but when Gabriel found this out, he held her hostage in an attempt to stifle the info. After confessing and preparing to surrender, the events of the 2005 station fire led to Gabriel escaping and Andrea perishing in the blaze. While Gabriel turned over a new leaf in the station fire and later got engaged to PC Sheelagh Murphy, the appearance of his alter ego the day of Sun Hill's 50th anniversary opened a can of worms that left David mortified that his identity was rumbled.
- Amanda Prosser's Reign: Earlier in 2005, Sun Hill Superintendent Adam Okaro suffered a personal tragedy when his wife and two children were killed in a car crash. Adam was unable to cope at first, nearly attacking the other driver after discovering she fell asleep at the wheel. Adam began cracking up on several jobs including nearly letting undercover DC Zain Nadir get shot after his cover was blown, causing a strike in uniform after the suspension and assault of two separate PCs and shouting at a woman caught driving under the influence due to the grief for his family. When DC Gary Best was shot by a drug dealer working for his long-term friend Isaac Collins, Adam deliberately smoked cannabis under National Crime Squad surveillance to concoct a fake resignation. He used this to go undercover as Isaac's head of security, but despite being rumbled and attacked by his oldest friend, Adam was rescued and Collins was arrested. It was at this time that Adam took leave to consider his future in the job, taking up work as a community outreach worker. His replacement was Acting Superintendent Amanda Prosser, DC Jo Masters joking that the officers at her previous station referred to her as "Prosser the Tosser". Her methods did not go down well with the relief, and she frequently clashed with those who stepped in her way. The events came to a head on the day of Sun Hill's 50th anniversary when dealing with a grieving father, Jeff Clarke (Stuart Laing), whose son was killed by a stolen car being driven safely. Furious that the driver would only be charged with offenses related to the theft, Clarke assaulted the boy, Ashley Morgan, but Prosser failed to have him assessed and demanded he be released immediately. This poor handling led to Clarke appearing at Sun Hill's 50th anniversary celebrations, angrily confronting Prosser in her office and holding her at gunpoint.
- Gina Gold's Cancer and Suspension: One plot that dominated the early proceedings of S21 was the revelation that Inspector Gina Gold was battling cancer. Although initially secretive, the diagnosis soon became public knowledge, and she began to have issues on the job. As she turned to the bottle in the absence of old friend Adam Okaro, following his departure from Sun Hill, she landed on Acting Superintendent Prosser's radar when she had an end of shift drink with four PCs. Prosser searched Gina's office and found a bottle of scotch, and gave her an unofficial warning. When Gina went off to have her lunch in a pub, Prosser was drafted in to locate a confused old man armed with a gun. Having dealt with him earlier, Prosser tried to reach Gina but could not, so she led an SO19 raid on the wrong house after failing to consult the other officers Gina was with. Gina returned in the wake of the raid and went to the right address, talking the man down and ending the siege safely. Despite Prosser complimenting Gina on her hard work, she was soon hauled over the coals by Borough Commander Barratt. Desperate to avoid a black mark in her quest to permanently take over Sun Hill, Prosser let slip Gina's drinking to make her a scapegoat, and Gina was swiftly suspended. Meeting up with Sergeant Dale Smith off-duty, Gina revealed she had overcome her cancer, and Smithy determined to get her back to work. Reaching out to Adam, Smithy persuaded him to take Gina to Sun Hill's 50th anniversary party.

== Synopsis ==
The episode begins with Superintendent Prosser struggling to negotiate with Jeff Clarke at gunpoint, while PC Gabriel Kent tries to help her talk Clarke down. As DCs Jo Masters, Terry Perkins and Zain Nadir give station tours, Kent spots them and tells them to stay where they are. As DCI Jack Meadows prepares to open the 50th anniversary proceedings, he sends PC Dan Casper to find Superintendent Prosser. As he enters CID, he is taken hostage by Clarke along with the rest of the group, however in the confusion Prosser grabs a radio and alerts CAD to the situation. Clarke fires a shot at Prosser and misses, but the gunshot is heard by the partygoers and glass from a CID window almost hits PC Roger Valentine out front. DCI Meadows takes DSs Phil Hunter and Samantha Nixon to the reception, and Sergeant Dale Smith goes to the door to be briefed. As Meadows coordinates a raid, Superintendent Adam Okaro forgets his leave and joins him to spearhead the operation. In CID, Clarke receives a call from Meadows, and Prosser foolishly persuades Dan to tackle Clarke. Despite protests from DCs Masters and Nadir, Dan lunges for Clarke along with Terry. In the struggle, the guests and other officers flee CID, but Clarke's gun goes off and shoots the real Gabriel Kent, sending him over the CID balcony. Clarke refuses to relinquish his weapon and it goes off again, hitting Dan in the arm, allowing Clarke to throw off Terry and take control of the situation once more. After initially refusing to let PC Kent get to his alter ego, he laments and lets him get down to him. Gabriel proceeds to take his brother's wallet and phone, then lets DSs Hunter and Nixon join him to get him aid. Meadows negotiates safe passage for paramedics with Clarke, who demands the ambulance not be let in to prevent SO19 being snuck in with it. Terry makes Dan comfortable and begins his own negotiation, and manages to find a mic and earpiece when Clarke throws all the phones out the window. Despite protests from Prosser, suspended Inspector Gina Gold takes over the negotiation and keeps in touch with Terry. As Supt. Okaro suggests checking the boy who killed Clarke's son, Ashley Morgan, PC Valentine discovers that he has gone missing. As Gina talks to Terry, he realises Clarke has abducted him, but they are unable to determine where he is holding him. As SO19 arrive, Sergeant Marc Rollins tells Prosser he has a clear shot on Clarke, but the fear of Morgan not being found leads her to opt against taking Clarke out. As the stress gets to her, Prosser takes Okaro aside for a chat, telling him it is clear where loyalties lie; "This your station, you're the one who should be running it." Prosser proceeds to her office to pack up her belongings, and Adam takes sole control of the negotiation.

At the hospital, Gabriel watches on as his brother is attended to, and sneaks in when the room is empty to wake him and threaten him not to say anything about David's theft of his identity. Back at Sun Hill, Terry manages to get Dan released so he can have his gunshot wound treated. After psycho-analysing one another, Clarke realises that Terry is wired and removes his earpiece before smashing the recorder. Explaining that he has abducted Ashley Morgan and was planning on blowing himself, Morgan and Prosser up, he begins his final act. When DC Suzie Sim finds Clarke's car, DS Phil Hunter and DC Zain Nadir steal a car parked out the front and drive after it, Clarke shooting at them as they escape before Zain loses control and hits construction. Thinking they are out of the way, Clarke begins to escape CID holding Terry hostage as Phil and Zain try to free Ashley from the boot of the car. Terry screams at his colleagues that the car is wired, and radio transmissions warn Phil and Zain. As they rescue Ashley, they race away from the car before it explodes. As word reaches Clarke, he drags Terry outside and tells him he would not hurt him. With the final words "Go and see your kids, Terry" (from whom he was estranged), Clarke pushes Terry away and holds his gun at him before being shot dead by SO19.

== Aftermath ==
While the siege is referenced in the episodes that follow, the major plot that follows the events are the Sun Hill team's attempts to identify the shooting victim in hospital, with PC Gabriel Kent fretting that his identity may be rumbled, and he makes plans to elope with his fiancé, PC Sheelagh Murphy. When Sergeant June Ackland asks PC Laura Bryant to review CCTV for a press release, she admitted to Sergeant Dale Smith that she was working the front desk at the time and the man identified himself as Gabriel Kent, and that he wanted to see June. Knowing that June had a son who was adopted as Gabriel Kent, who Smithy had assumed was PC Kent, the pair took their findings to June. Accompanying her to hospital, June was devastated as she identified him as her son. Admitting she had kept PC Kent's identity a secret, she revealed he was actually David Kent, Gabriel's adoptive brother. Smithy put the info aside for the time being, telling June he always suspected Gabriel raped deceased lover Kerry, and shared with her Andrea's suspicions of Gabriel's involvement with the serial sniper. As Gabriel became more concerned, he went to the hospital and set off a fire alarm to get access to his brother's room, smothering him with a pillow. Smithy arranged for PC Steve Hunter to check out the hospital and found the real Gabriel unconscious and unresponsive. The crash team revived him, and back at Sun Hill DS Samantha Nixon found out that the shooting victim's clothes were US-made, and after contacting Interpol and the FBI, discovered the fingerprint on file was registered to the real Gabriel Kent. Liaising with Smithy, he arranged an arrest team as Sam prepared her facts to take them to Superintendent Okaro. Attending a call about burning clothes being thrown from a block of flats, Gabriel noticed an arrest team down below and dragged June up to the roof as a hostage. Admitting he had "killed" her son, colluded with sniper then killed him and left PC Andrea Dunbar to die in the station fire, it was the revelation that he had raped PC Kerry Young that led to Sergeant Dale Smith, who was observing the events, coming out of cover to attack Gabriel. As he put him on the floor and went to rescue June, who was handcuffed to a railing, Gabriel returned to his feet and attacked Smithy again. Overpowering him, Gabriel realised he had nowhere left to run and climbed onto a scaffolding pole before jumping off the rooftop to his death. His death was deemed suicide at an inquest, and June used it as an opportunity to reunite with her son. PC Sheelagh Murphy, engaged to Gabriel at the time of his death, left Sun Hill after his inquest to join the Child Protection Team, having initially planned a resignation in the wake of his suicide.

== Plot cast ==
- Supt. Adam Okaro (Cyril Nri)
- A/Supt. Amanda Prosser (Serena Gordon) – Exits in live ep
- Insp. Gina Gold (Roberta Taylor) – Temporarily departs after live ep
- Sgt. June Ackland (Trudie Goodwin)
- Sgt. Dale Smith (Alex Walkinshaw)
- PC Dan Casper (Chris Jarvis)
- PC Honey Harman (Kim Tiddy)
- PC Yvonne Hemmingway (Michele Austin)
- PC Amber Johannsen (Myfanwy Waring)
- PC Gabriel Kent (Todd Carty)- Exits soon after live ep
- PC Sheelagh Murphy (Bernie Nolan)
- PC Tony Stamp (Graham Cole)
- PC Roger Valentine (John Bowler)
- PC Laura Bryant – (Melanie Kilburn)
- PC Steve Hunter (James Lloyd)
- DCI Jack Meadows (Simon Rouse)
- DS Samantha Nixon (Lisa Maxwell)
- DS Phil Hunter (Scott Maslen)
- DC Jo Masters (Sally Rogers)
- DC Zain Nadir (TJ Ramini)
- DC Terry Perkins (Bruce Byron)
- DC Suzie Sim (Wendy Kweh)
- Sgt. Marc Rollins (Stefan Booth)
- Jeff Clarke (Stuart Laing)
- The Real Gabriel Kent (James Barriscale)
- Ashley Morgan (Troy Glasgow)
- Marion Clarke (Jennifer Hennessy)
- Alan Morgan (Francis Johnson)
