= The Sun Hill Fire =

The Sun Hill Fire may refer to:

- Sun Hill fire (2002), The Bill storyline which killed six characters
- Sun Hill fire (2005), The Bill storyline which killed three characters
