= Bloody Baron =

Bloody Baron may refer to:

- "The Bloody Baron", a character and a quest in The Witcher 3: Wild Hunt video game
- a ghost and member of the Hogwarts staff in the Harry Potter series
- Roman von Ungern-Sternberg (c. 1886–1921), authoritarian ruler of Mongolia, nicknamed the Bloody Baron
