= Barriscale =

Barriscale is a surname. Notable people with the surname include:

- Bessie Barriscale (1884–1965), American silent-film and stage actress
- James Barriscale (born 1969), English-Irish actor and voiceover artist
