= Boudica (2003 film) =

British historical film

- Written by: Andrew Davies
- Directed by: Bill Anderson
- Starring: Alex Kingston; Steven Waddington; Emily Blunt
- Theme music composer: Nina Humphreys
- Countries of origin: United Kingdom; Romania
- Original language: English

Production
- Running time: 98 minutes

Original release
- Release: 28 September 2003

Boudica (released in the United States as Warrior Queen) is a 2003 British biographical-historical television film about the queen of the Iceni tribe, Boudica. It stars Alex Kingston, Steven Waddington and Emily Blunt in her film debut.

== Premise ==
Boudica, the Warrior Queen of Britain, leads her tribe into rebellion against the Roman Empire and the mad Emperor of Rome Nero.

== Production ==
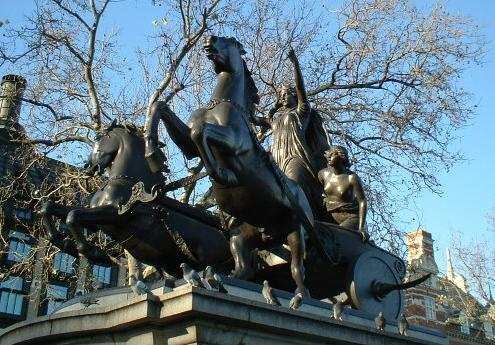
The statue of Boudica near Westminster Pier, London, was used in the final scenes of the film

The film used locations in the United Kingdom and Romania. The Boudica statue by Thomas Thornycroft near Westminster Pier, London, was used for the film's closing scenes in modern-day London. In Romania, the MediaPro Studios, Bucharest, were used.

The film has been released as A Rainha da Era do Bronze in Brazil, as La Reina de los guerreros in Argentina (video title) and as Warrior Queen in the United States.

According to the movie, King Prasutagus of the Icenii died at about the same time as the Roman emperor Claudius. However, the latter died in 54 AD, while the former died in 61 AD.

== Cast ==
- Alex Kingston as Boudica
- Steven Waddington as King Prasutagus
- Emily Blunt as Isolda
- Leanne Rowe as Siora
- Ben Faulks as Connach
- Hugo Speer as Dervalloc
- Gary Lewis as Magior the Shaman
- Alex Hassell as Roman Officer
- James Clyde as Roman Sergeant
- Angus Wright as Severus
- Steve John Shepherd as Catus
- Jack Shepherd as Claudius
- Gideon Turner as Didius
- Frances Barber as Agrippina the Younger
- Andrew-Lee Potts as Nero
- Theodor Danetti as Master of Ceremonies
- Cristina Serban as Iceni Mother
- Alin Olteanu as Iceni Warrior
- Emil Hostina as Arcon
- Claudiu Bleonț as Ossac
- Claudiu Trandafir as Roman Horseman
- Ion Haiduc as Captain of the Guard
- Nicodim Ungureanu as Roman Guard
- Bogdan Dumitrescu as Roman Guard
- Michael Feast as Suetonius
- Kara Tointon as Poppaea
- Jack Galloway as aide-de-camp to Suetonius
- Dominic Cooper (uncredited)
- Marian Iacob as Horribulus (uncredited)
- Dorjn Zaharja as Tysonius (uncredited)

== See also ==
- List of historical films
- List of films set in ancient Rome
