= Leanne Rowe =

English actress and singer

- Born: 1982 (age 43–44); Brentwood, Essex, England
- Occupation: Actress
- Years active: 1996–present

Leanne Rowe (born 1982) is an English actress and singer, known for portraying Nancy in Oliver Twist, May Moss in Lilies and Baby in Dirty Dancing: The Classic Story on Stage.

== Background ==
Rowe is from Brentwood, Essex. She has two older sisters and a brother.

Rowe left school at the age of 16 to train as a dancer, attending Laine Theatre Arts. She graduated at the age of 19 with honours in musical theatre. Rowe also studied Drama, and after graduating, chose to pursue a career in acting instead of dance.

== Career ==
Rowe made her film and professional debut at the age of 12, playing Helen Burns in Franco Zeffirelli's Jane Eyre. In 2005 she was chosen by Roman Polanski to play Nancy in his adaptation of Oliver Twist. Her television credits include Boudica, The Famous Five and Where the Heart Is. She also played the lead role of May Moss in the Liverpool-set BBC One drama Lilies.

Rowe's radio drama work includes Avoid London, Loving, Forget Me Not, One Chord Wonders, Roald Dahl's The Witches and To Sir with Love.

Rowe made her West End debut in Dirty Dancing: The Classic Story on Stage, playing the lead role of Frances 'Baby' Houseman. In 2009 she appeared in the revival of Victoria Wood's Talent at the Menier Chocolate Factory, playing Julie.

== Filmography ==
=== Television ===
Year	Show	Role	Notes
1996	The Famous Five	Harriet: Five on Finniston Farm (1996)	TV series
2003	Boudica	Siora	Television film
2004	Where the Heart Is	Waitress: Stormy Weather (2004)	TV series
2007	Lilies	May Moss	TV series
2013	Call the Midwife	Ruby Roberts	TV series

=== Film ===
Year	Film	Role	Notes
1996	Jane Eyre	Helen Burns	Feature film
2005	Oliver Twist	Nancy	Feature film

=== Theatre ===
Year	Production	Venue	Role	Notes
2008	Dirty Dancing: The Classic Story on Stage	Aldwych Theatre	Frances 'Baby' Houseman	Musical
2009	Talent	Menier Chocolate Factory	Julie	Musical / Play
2011	Lovesong	Warwick Arts Centre	Margaret	Frantic Assembly
