= Lilies (TV series) =

2007 British television period drama series

- Genre: Drama
- Created by: Heidi Thomas
- Directed by: David Moore; Roger Goldby; Ferdinand Fairfax; Brian Kelly
- Starring: Catherine Tyldesley; Kerrie Hayes; Leanne Rowe
- Composer: Kevin Sargent
- Country of origin: United Kingdom
- Original language: English
- No. of series: 1
- No. of episodes: 8

Production
- Executive producers: Heidi Thomas; Tony Garnett
- Production locations: Liverpool, England
- Camera setup: Single-camera
- Running time: 59 minutes
- Production company: World Productions

Original release
- Network: BBC One
- Release: 12 January – 2 March 2007

Lilies is a British period drama television series, written by Heidi Thomas, which ran for one eight-episode series in early 2007 on BBC One. The show's tagline was "Liverpool, 1920. Three girls on the edge of womanhood, a world on the brink of change." Despite high ratings of 4.5–5 million viewers and being The Sunday Times Pick of the Week for eight weeks in a row, Lilies was not recommissioned for a second series.

== Outline ==
Lilies details the lives of Iris, May and Ruby Moss, three Catholic sisters living with their widowed father and brother in a terraced house in Liverpool in the early 1920s. The story is set in the years immediately after the First World War and, as such, the after effects of that conflict are apparent. The story depicts a life lived on a knife-edge of poverty, tempered by various kinds of love. All three girls must make their own way in the world. In the course of the series, each sister tastes passion for the first time, and their lives, newly launched, are changed forever.

== Production ==
Heidi Thomas first developed the idea for Lilies from listening to her grandmother's stories about growing up in post-war Liverpool. The Moss sisters are loosely based on her grandmother and her three sisters. Some aspects of the series, such as the grave fund that the girls save for, are taken directly from their lives. Thomas wrote the first complete draft of the script in 1996 but it was almost ten years before it was optioned by the BBC. During that time she lost the script and had to recreate it from an old copy she found in her attic. Thomas elected to insert certain elements into the script to give the series a sense of realism, such as the slaughter of animals in the Moss home. A variety of actors were cast in Lilies, including native Liverpudlian Kerrie Hayes in her acting debut.

During location scouting, the production team was unable to find an area of Liverpool with terraced houses that had been sufficiently preserved so they decided to reconstruct a whole neighbourhood on a backlot in Aintree. In order to give a sense of space to the production, large painted billboards mimicking distant buildings were erected on the edges of the set. Other scenes were filmed on location at the Woolton Picture House, the Walker Art Gallery, and Croxteth Hall.

== Cast ==
- Catherine Tyldesley as Iris Moss
- Kerrie Hayes as Ruby Moss
- Leanne Rowe as May Moss
- Brian McCardie as Dadda Moss
- Daniel Rigby as Billy Moss
- Scot Williams as Father Melia
- Iain McKee as Frank Gadney
- Georgia Taylor as Phyllis Cook
- Stephen Moyer as Richard Brazendale
- Jennifer Hennessy as Madeleine Brazendale
- Rose Farley as Margaret McBride
- Charlie Deery as Arthur McBride
- Anthony Burrows as Barney McBride
- Pam Ferris as Alice Bird
- Gillian Kearney as Miss Bird
- Laura Wallace as Queenie Higgs
- William Ash as Nathaniel "Nazzer" Sullivan

== Episodes ==
=== 1. "The Chit Behind King Billy" ===
The first episode introduces the Moss family; Dadda Moss and his children; Iris, May, Ruby and Billy. Mamma Moss has recently died and Walter, Ruby's twin brother, died during the First World War. All the family work, except Billy. Dadda works at the local dairy and is local vet. Iris runs the house and makes chocolates, May is a parlourmaid to the Brazendales and Ruby, having been previously employed by the Post Office, is now a dressmaker, employed by Aurora Corsets.

Father Melia, the local priest, announces that there will be a homecoming street party as all the young men who survived the war have returned and asks the Mosses to lend the pianola for some music. Unfortunately it was pawned to pay for Mamma's funeral and the family do everything they can to raise the money necessary to get it back in time. Ruby works overtime, selling corsets, and May dances at a gentleman's club in her underwear. The Brazendales, Richard and Madeleine, take an interest in May. Richard sits with May in the kitchen and tries to make friends, much to May's surprise. May supports Madeleine after she miscarries again.

Ruby trains for a place on the British Ladies Olympic swimming team, with a former neighbour, Phyllis Cook. On the day of the trial, Ruby's family go to support her, including Billy – despite his terror of water after his ship sank. Someone, however, disapproves of Billy as he receives white feathers (symbolising cowardice) in the post and gets another on the day of the trial, leading him to attempt suicide. He survives and tells his family that Phyllis was responsible, leading her and Ruby to fight in the street, and lose their places on the Olympic team. Phyllis sent them to Billy, angry that he survived while her dad (serving on the same ship) didn't.

(Originally broadcast: 12 January 2007)

=== 2. "The Thunderbolt" ===
Iris, May and Ruby are unhappy with Dadda's behaviour and discuss it while at confession. They agree to put their foot down about it, leading Dadda to put the rabbits in the backyard up for sale. Iris starts going out the man who buys them, Domingo Hennessy, and after a brief courtship, he proposes marriage and Iris accepts. Dadda and Ruby are unhappy about this (both hating change) but come round to the idea. Domingo tells them that he was in the army during the war but was invalided out. Domingo reveals the full extent of his injuries to Iris on their wedding night. She is angry to discover that the future she hoped for (a home and family of her own) is impossible. Disgusted by Domingo's lies, she goes home and is assured by Father Melia that she will not have to return or get a divorce.

(Originally broadcast: 19 January 2007)

=== 3. "The White Charger" ===
Mrs. Brazendale goes to a spa for her nerves, reducing May's workload. Free from lunchtime, her friendship with Richard Brazendale turns to flirtation but halts when he introduces her to a friend, Claude Freeman. He claims to be a portrait photographer, but his motives are far from pure. Knowing this, Richard rescues May from Claude's studio and finding her drugged, puts her to bed and sleeps on her bedroom floor.Seeing him there and discussing their feelings later, they realise they care deeply for each other and start an affair. Unfortunately Mrs. Brazendale returns sooner than planned and in disgust at Madeleine telling May about how pleased Richard was to see her, May walks out. Dadda and Billy practice, with the rest of their lodge, for the 12th July march (they are staunch Protestants). Iris struggles to cope with what she discovered about Domingo after she married him. Father Melia tells Iris that, although it will take time, her marriage can be dissolved. Mrs. Dobbs visits Ruby, wanting the gossip about Iris and Domingo.

(Originally broadcast: 26 January 2007)

=== 4. "The Tallyman" ===
Iris helps Mrs Quirke (the local midwife) when Mrs. McBride gives birth prematurely. Dadda sees that the McBrides are ill and calls the doctor but they die, leaving seven children. Iris takes the girls and the boys stay with Father Melia at the rectory. The doctor notifies the Board of Health and the epidemics gentleman calls the tallyman, worried about overcrowding. Dadda makes sure no families are broken up. Realising no one can take all seven children, Father Melia puts them in an orphanage, having been assured that they will be raised together. Once the paperwork is complete, the Matron tells Father Melia and Iris that Arthur (the youngest) will be transferred to Doctor Barnardo's for adoption and the older boys will go abroad. Horrified, Father Melia and Iris want to remove the children but are refused permission. Ruby and Billy, suspicious that May didn't get a reference, write to Richard Brazendale and he replies, revealing May walked out but will be given a reference if she visits his office. They meet and Richard ends their romance but later sends a key and a note with an address, asking her to meet him. Curious, she goes and he offers her a flat. Guessing he wants her to be his mistress, she is furious, feeling that would make her little better than a prostitute and walks out.

(Originally broadcast: 2 February 2007)

=== 5. "The Sea" ===
Billy gets a letter from an old friend, Nathaniel Sullivan, known as Nazzer. In his letter, Nazzer tells Billy that he is being transferred to the Turner Home and asks him to visit. It is revealed that Billy and Nazzer's relationship is homosexual and they have feelings for each other. Iris invites him to tea, Nazzer accepts and Billy invites Queenie Hicks to join them, knowing she fancies him. She agrees, providing Billy is her date at a dance. During the tea party, Nazzer tells Dadda what he saw the night their ship sank when Dadda tells him about Billy's nightmares and fear of water. Nazzer stays over and helps Billy overcome his fear of the sea but admits hating living as a cripple in institutions. He asks Billy to help him commit suicide, but he refuses. The night Billy and Queenie go to the dance, he visits Nazzer only to find him dying of pneumonia. Billy attends the funeral and signs up as cabin steward on the Aquitania, in his memory. May has a new job — cook for Father Melia — and Iris helps her. Father Melia tells her that the McBride boys have been split up but he hopes to get the girls transferred to Catholic orphanages so they can stay together. Seeing that May is ill, Father Melia calls the doctor and he tells her that she is pregnant. Now unable to work, she hands in her notice and visits Richard. She is shocked to learn Madeleine left deliberately, leaving Richard to seduce May. They hoped she would get pregnant and give them the baby. Angry at being used, she tells Madeleine about Richard's offer of a flat and leaves.

(Originally broadcast: 9 February 2007)

=== 6. "The Release" ===
Iris and Ruby discovers May's pregnancy and do not react well. Panicking, May visits the Brazendales, wanting money for a termination. They refuse but worried about what May will do, Madeleine threatens to have her charged if she harms the baby. May ignores her and tries to induce a miscarriage but asks Iris and Ruby for help when feeling ill, so the baby isn't harmed. Ruby receives a letter from Marianne Parkes. She condemns corsets, believing them vile and unnecessary, and invites Ruby to a debate. She invites Ruby to a picnic, drawing her into their intellectual circle. They advocate reproductive rights for women and vegetarianism amongst other things. Iris and May see Ruby is becoming a snob and warn her to be careful but she releases the pigs kept by the butcher on an allotment, damaging other allotments. Ruby admits what she has done and is ordered to pay compensation and work on the damaged allotments. Joseph, the butcher, is impressed by Ruby's spirit and they become friends. Ruby is horrified when she learns her new friends believe in sterilising people they deem unfit to reproduce – particularly girls that have illegitimate children and she rejects them. She promises to support May and helps her hide her condition. Iris supports May too after Father Melia reminds her that May needs support, not condemnation.

(Originally broadcast: 16 February 2007)

=== 7. "The Serpent" ===
Billy comes home for a visit, bringing mini pineapples and a snake. The snake leads Dadda to meet a Miss Bird — she is a teacher and asks Dadda to give a talk about the snake. He does and starts accompanying Miss Bird and her classes on their excursions. They start dating and Dadda invites her to tea to meet his children. They are horrified that their father has a girlfriend and that Billy's new job is a waiter in a gentleman's club. The girls insist that he end it. Iris reveals that she wants to be a nun. Father Melia initially supports her but later changes his mind and refuses to explain. May starts dating Frank Gadney and Ruby starts dating Joseph. May is happy with Frank until she sees Richard Brazendale, who visits before sailing to New York. After feeling the baby kick, he asks her to love their child and May realises that she can not hide her pregnancy any longer. Dadda is horrified at the news and walks out but returns later, drunk. Angry with his daughters, he beats May but Iris and Ruby protect her. Dadda packs his belongings and leaves. Frank, bathing May's wounds, asks her to marry him but she refuses, telling him she is in love with the baby's father.

(Originally broadcast: 23 February 2007)

=== 8. "The Reckoning" ===
Billy's new job and May's condition makes Iris feel that they are the talk of the street. Mrs. Quirke, the midwife, refuses to help at the birth and Richard tells Ruby that he and Madeleine offered to adopt the baby. Ruby confronts her and May reveals that that was what Madeleine wanted all along. May comes to terms with her son, but a visit from Madeleine and a row with Dadda, make her decide to allow Madeleine to adopt the baby. Richard Brazendale stops May signing the papers, knowing that it isn't her decision. He persuades her to make her own decision and – aided by her sisters – she does. Father Melia visits Iris, wanting to apologise as the bishop, confused by Iris's request for a reference, sends Canon Kenan for an explanation. He admits that he has feelings for Iris and is sent to Ireland on retreat but discovers that she is not joining a convent, due to their exorbitant demand of 300 guineas and a pair of silver candlesticks. Dadda goes home to find the pianola gone and the Brazendales are adopting the baby. Dadda objects but Billy tells him that it is not his decision. Seeing his daughters return with the baby and shaken by recent events, Dadda takes the temperance pledge again and registers his grandson's birth, naming him Victor William Moss. He also asks if he can come home and his children welcome him back.

(Originally broadcast: 2 March 2007)

== DVD ==
This series is available on DVD, distributed by Acorn Media UK.
