= The Bloody Baron =

Video game quest

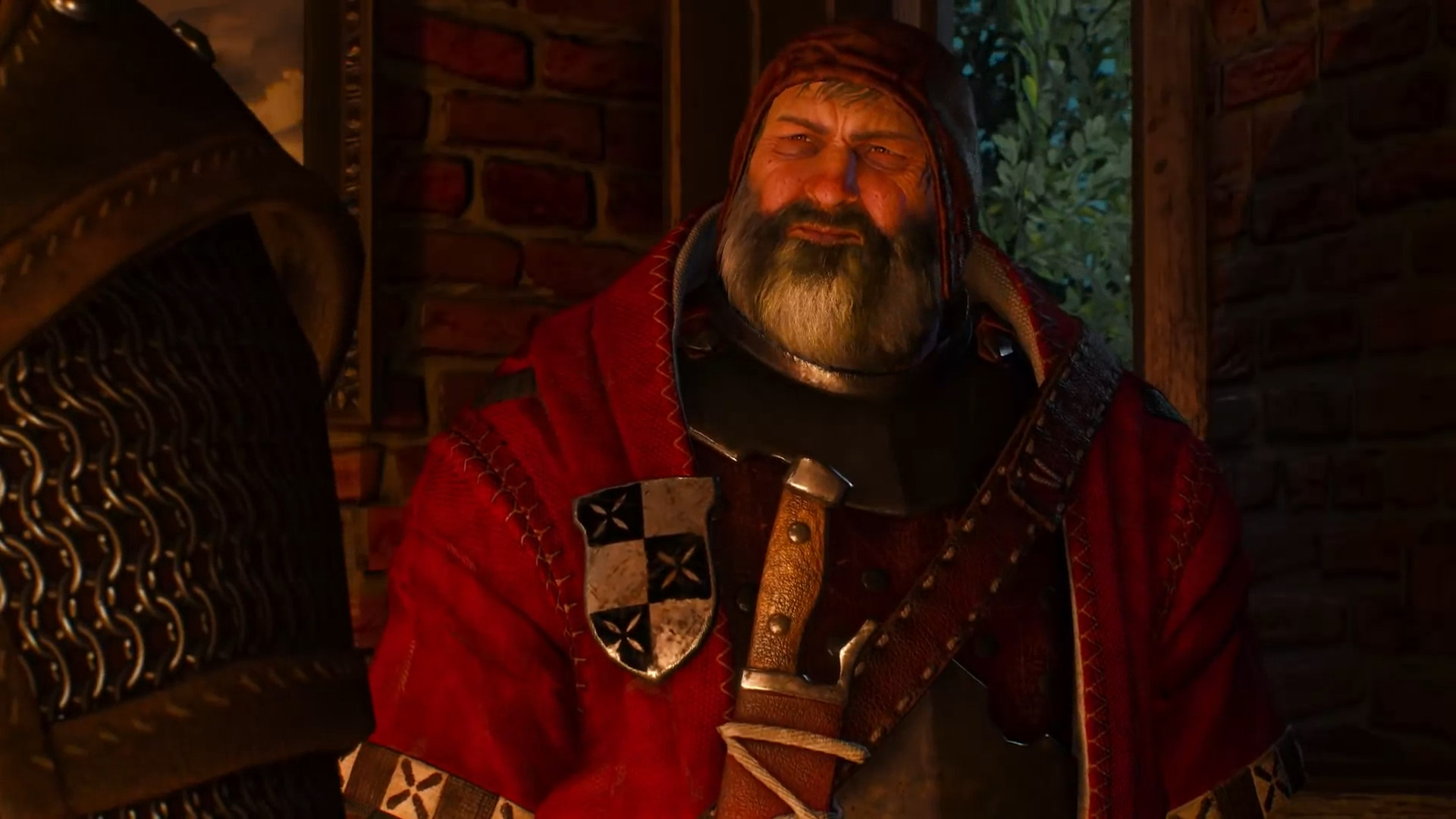
Phillip Strenger, better known as the Bloody Baron

"Family Matters" (Polish: Sprawy rodzinne), more commonly called "The Bloody Baron" (Polish: Krwawy Baron), is a quest in The Witcher 3: Wild Hunt. It was designed by Paweł Sasko and written by Karolina Stachyra. The quest follows Geralt, the protagonist of the series, as he helps Phillip Strenger, the eponymous Baron, find his family in the war-torn region of Velen.

"Family Matters" has been hailed by multiple journalists as one of the best quests in the game. It won a Golden Joystick Award in 2015 for Best Gaming Moment.

== Quest summary ==
=== Background ===
Geralt of Rivia, the protagonist and player character of The Witcher 3: Wild Hunt, is a monster slayer for hire known as a Witcher. The game centers on Geralt's search for his adopted daughter, Ciri of Cintra, who is on the run from the Wild Hunt. His search leads him to the fortress of the Bloody Baron, a warlord who recently conquered the region of Velen. The Baron admits to harboring Ciri and offers information about her whereabouts in return for finding his missing wife, Anna, and their daughter, Tamara.

=== Locating Tamara ===
Searching the Baron's family home, Geralt finds a lost talisman under the floorboards and signs of a violent struggle. The Baron claims to be oblivious, admitting that he often passes out from binge drinking. He suggests that Geralt seek information from a holy man called the Pellar.

The pellar performs a divination on the talisman and reveals that Anna was pregnant but had miscarried due to abuse from the Baron, causing the fetus to become an undead creature called a botchling. He explains that the botchling is bonded with Anna and can be used to continue tracking her. Geralt returns to the fortress and confronts a drunken Baron about his abusive rages. The Baron insists that he never hit his daughter but confesses to hitting his wife. He also admits to burying the fetus in an unmarked grave.

Geralt and the Baron visit the grave to find it empty, and the pair are confronted by the botchling. The player is given the choice to kill the botchling and use its blood in another ritual with the pellar, or convince the Baron to hold the botchling in a naming ritual which lifts the curse and earns the botching's help. Either option results in Geralt tracking Anna to a nearby fisherman.

The fisherman admits he tried to help the women leave the region, but glowing marks appeared on Anna's hands, and she was kidnapped by a fiend. Meanwhile, Tamara found refuge in Oxenfurt, a nearby town. Geralt finds Tamara but she refuses to return to her father.

=== Locating Anna ===
The Baron sharing his story with Geralt

Geralt reports to the Baron, who is frustrated that Geralt did not retrieve his daughter. The Baron recounts the story of his failed marriage; as a young soldier, the Baron was constantly away, and the hardships of war drove him to alcoholism. He became physically and emotionally distant from Anna, and she proceeded to have an affair. When he found out, he killed Anna's lover and their marriage turned from strained to abusive. The player is given the option for Geralt to react with understanding, condemnation, or apathy.

Content that Geralt has fulfilled his promise, the Baron helps track Ciri to the Crookbag Bog. There Geralt finds an old woman with several orphans who affectionately call her "Gran". Gran reacts coldly to Geralt, but the children direct him to a nearby spirit who may have seen Ciri. Geralt helps the friendly spirit retrieve its voice from a magical object hidden in a monster nest. The spirit then convinces Gran to help Geralt find Ciri.

Gran shows Geralt a haunted tapestry which speaks in the voices of three women. The tapestry withholds information about Ciri until Geralt defeats a spirit known as the Whispering Hillock. After a confrontation with the Hillock, Geralt learns that three witches called "the Crones" have manipulated him through the tapestry. He deduces that Gran is actually Anna; the Crones have transformed her into their slave by branding her hands. Anna had been using the talisman to protect herself from the Crones, but upon losing it, she became vulnerable and was kidnapped.

The story can end in one of two ways:

- If Geralt frees the Whispering Hillock, the Crones curse Anna and turn her into a water hag. Geralt can lift the curse and save Anna from her undead fate, but at the cost of her life. When Geralt reports back to the Baron, he has hanged himself due to guilt and grief.
- If Geralt kills the Whispering Hillock, the Crones thank Geralt and abscond with the orphans, hinting at their desire to eat them. Geralt and the Baron find Anna, but she has gone mad from her ordeals. The Baron desperately takes Anna to find a healer and the soldiers at the Baron's fortress become more ruthless in his absence.

== Development ==
=== Quest design ===
Paweł Sasko of CD Projekt RED presenting the "Family Matters" quest design at GDC 2017

Quests in The Witcher 3 are conceptualized by two teams: the writers, who create an overview of what happens in the quest, and the designers, who develop a more detailed outline of the player's actions. The teams then collaborate to finalize the overall experience. The "Family Matters" quest was designed by Paweł Sasko (lead technical quest designer at CD Projekt RED) and written by Karolina Stachyra.

Sasko revealed the teams' overall approach to quest design at the Game Developers Conference in 2017. A quest's story sequence is typically mapped to a pacing graph that illustrates the relative tension of each scene and story beat, as well as any involved combat or other types of interactive gameplay. Sasko's strategy is to avoid using clichés unless they are used self-consciously, and his team frequently discards their initial ideas to adhere to this.

=== Setting and characters ===
According to Sasko, the concept of the quest originated from a single sentence: "Geralt meets a 'Baron' who wants the Witcher to kill a monster, and offers information about Ciri in return." The quest is designed to embody the region of Velen "with all of its beauty and troubles", highlighting its themes of war, famine, death, lost people, magical rituals, and monsters. Sasko's approach to the storyline was influenced by his experience growing up in a poor village in the Polish mountains where he saw multiple cases of alcoholism and domestic violence.

Sasko and Stachyra designed the Baron to serve as a contrasting character to Geralt; both men are searching for their families and have a bloody past, but the Baron's position as warlord and history of marital abuse complicates his moral standing. The designers focused on the irony of the character who wants to reunite his family being revealed as the one responsible for breaking them up. Sasko also designed the Baron to have charisma and a sense of humor in order to make the player feel conflicted. To that effect, the team intentionally planned the revelation of the Baron's abuse to come after the player learned that the Baron had provided refuge to Ciri.

The botchling, a half-bat half-newborn whose name derives from the Polish word for "miscarriage", was inspired by a demon from Slavic folklore.

=== Themes ===
The development team have called "Family Matters" one of the most difficult quests to design due to its ambitious subjects and nuanced themes. Both Sasko and Stachyra wanted the story to reflect the idea that no one is completely good or completely evil.

Sasko has stated that the choice to forgive the Baron was added as an opportunity for players to reflect on the quest's themes and form their own opinion; he noted that a majority of players forgave the Baron and considers that as validation that the team had designed an interesting choice. Stachrya has stated that they feel stories should not necessarily have a happy ending, and Geralt should not always be able to find a perfect solution.

=== Production ===
The Baron was voiced by Tomasz Dedek in the original Polish version and James Clyde in the English translation. Dedek had done dubbing since 1989, but for Clyde (a classically-trained stage actor) this was his first video game role. The script was sent to Clyde in fragments, leading to confusion over the overarching plot of the quest. Clyde consulted with lead writer Borys Pugacz-Muraszkiewicz for clarification during recording sessions.

== Reception ==
"It's superbly written, brilliantly acted, and the branching paths make it well worth replaying. It's The Witcher 3 and developer CD Projekt RED at their absolute best, and was the highlight of the game for many players."

— Andy Kelly, PC Gamer

VG247 calls "Family Matters" one of the best and most memorable quests in The Witcher 3. PC Gamer describes it as the best quest in the game, praising its writing, acting, and dynamic storytelling. PCGamesN also calls it the game's best quest, attributing its "emotional punch" to the quality of its writing and voice acting. They further described it as the game's most notorious quest, and credit it for the game's success in its exploration of the theme of family. The quest has also been called the best in the game by GameSpot.

Polygon highlights the quest's cult status among fans, stating that "the Baron's deeply sad tale is the first time some players realize the game is something special, [earning] the Bloody Baron a spot on our best characters of last decade list." They further describe the Baron's quest as "the standout moment in The Witcher 3".

The quest has made several top 10 lists on TheGamer, including those for the game's most heartbreaking moments and moments they hoped to see in the adapted television series. TheGamer also calls the quest the peak of the game's storytelling, further listing it as one of the most meaningful choices that can only be understood through a replay and one of the game's darkest, most difficult choices. The site also attributes two of the game's most heartbreaking cut-scenes and two of the game's most deserved deaths to the quest.

"Family Matters" was awarded Best Gaming Moment at the 2015 Golden Joystick Awards. Developer Chris Avallone cited the critical reception of the quest as a reason for hiring the same writers on the game Dying Light 2.
