= Confessions of a Killer (The Bill) =

- The Bill episode
- Episode no.: Series 21; Episode 14
- Directed by: Nic Phillips
- Written by: Simon Moss
- Original air date: 23 February 2005

Episode chronology
| ← Previous "Exposed" | Next → "Inferno" |
- The Bill (series 21)

"Confessions of a Killer (288)" is an episode of the long-running police procedural television series, The Bill, broadcast in 2005. The episode is significant in the show's history, as it features the events of the second "Sun Hill Fire", which resulted in the death of three officers. The episode attracted over nine million viewers, and was only the second time computer generated imagery had been used on the show. The imagery was used because producing a real explosion and fireball ripping through the station corridors was not possible.

== Prelude storylines ==
- Andrea's Exposure as a Journalist: In the previous series, Natalie J Robb was cast as PC Andrea Dunbar, a probationer who was secretly undercover as a journalist to find out if the Metropolitan Police had become too politically correct in the wake of the Macpherson Report. Over the course of the year, Andrea supplied a number of confidential stories to the press. Superintendent Adam Okaro was the primary target of Andrea's editor Bruce Malcolm (Alasdair Harvey), but he continued to write reports about a sniper who shot at two of his officers, one of them fatally. After being confronted by Okaro, Bruce told Andrea she would be withdrawn. Having embarked on an affair with DI Neil Manson, she was keen to avoid an exposure to save his reputation, in case the affair revealed. She planned to investigate fellow officer PC Gabriel Kent, who she suspected of being an associate of sniper Jason Hardy (Martin Savage. Meeting with a military reporter, she was told there was a press cutting of Jason Hardy with Kent's adoptive brother David, but she was unaware that Bruce had gone on to print her expose.
- Gabriel's Double Murder: Unaware to Andrea in the buildup of the episode's events, Gabriel had been running riot at Sun Hill by committing a litany of crimes over the course of the previous year. The events started with him having suspects beaten up when he was assigned to the Cole Lane Estate in the summer of 2004. Newly hired PCSO Laura Bryant had been his partner in crime until Kent had a gang of thugs assault two teenagers who got away with robbing a pensioner, and Laura was more than willing to provide that info to Andrea. Gabriel's crimes went further when he collaborated when an old friend from the Navy, Jason Hardy, to kill criminals who evaded justice in sniper attacks. When Gabriel became obsessed with PC Kerry Young, he violently raped her in order to cause a break up between her and PC Cameron Tait. When Cameron attacked Gabriel out of revenge, he opted to resign and return home to Sydney. With nothing left, Kerry made it her mission to destroy Gabriel. When she discovered he was working at Sun Hill under his brother's identity, she vowed to expose this and end his career. When Gabriel discovered Kerry was coming into the station to speak to Inspector Gina Gold, he got Hardy's rifle and fatally gunned Kerry down in the arms of her lover, Sergeant Dale Smith. When Hardy shot at Gabriel as he arrested a suspect, his botched shooting of the suspect led to Hardy being identified in the aftermath. As the arrest team swarmed in, Kent went to Hardy and threw him five stories to his death from the balcony of Hardy's flat. In the buildup to the fire, Gabriel realised Andrea was onto him and issued a threat, however this only heightened his determination.
- The Racist PCSO: In January 2005, the aforementioned Laura Bryant was joined at Sun Hill by a fellow PCSO, Colin Fairfax. It became apparent soon after his arrival that Colin was racist. After a series of derogatory comments caught the attention of several officers, but it was a racially motivated criminal damage case that alerted Sergeant Dale Smith to the situation. Having backed up the claims of the suspect, his former boss Chris Payne (Stuart Goodwin), Smithy reprimanded Colin and told him he would be sacked if he was caught being racist once more.
- June and Jim's Marriage Breakdown: A short lived marriage between Sergeant June Ackland and DC Jim Carver was brought to an abrupt end when Jim ended up £63,000 in debt after becoming addicted to gambling. When June remortgaged her home to pay off the debts, she had to return from a brief retirement to pay her second mortgage off. Whilst June was on a cruise without Jim, his ex-wife Marie (Melanie Hill) died of exposure after falling asleep whilst drunk, leaving Jim devastated. As he discovered June had returned to work, he was determined to get her back, but her resentment towards Jim led her to having an affair with PC Roger Valentine.
- Alan Kennedy Serial Rape Trial: Throughout the previous series, a serial rapist operating in the area was sought by Sun Hill CID. After being identified as Alan Kennedy (James Clyde), DS Samantha Nixon secured his arrest and coerced a confession from him in interview. However, in the months leading up to his trial, starting the day before the fire occurred, several key incidents weakened the case. Arresting officer PC Cameron Tait resigned, Sexual Offences Investigation Technique (SOIT) officer PC Kerry Young was murdered, case profiler Dr. Hugh Wallis was arrested for abduction and Kennedy retracted his confession whilst on remand. Day one of the trial went smoothly, but the revelation of Andrea's true identity the day before she was due to give evidence meant day two would be a rough ride for the prosecution.

== Synopsis ==
The events of the episode begin with Superintendent Adam Okaro and Inspector Gina Gold trying to track down PC Andrea Dunbar after her exposure as an undercover journalist, unaware she was meeting with her lover, DI Neil Manson. Both were mortified when they discovered that she had been exposed, and as they met again at court ahead of Alan Kennedy's trial, Manson dumped her and accused of her being two-faced, asking if her apology was on or off the record. As they continued to feud, Okaro witnessed it, realising that they had been having an affair. Back at Sun Hill, DCs Ken Drummond and Jim Carver interviewed the Meghan brothers, under suspicion of running a credit card cloning operation. Out on patrol, PCSO Colin Fairfax clashes with PC Leela Kapoor over his handling of an Asian suspect in custody, and his mood with her worsens when she stops him investigating the robbery of an elderly woman's purse, as it is out of his authority to investigate crimes. At court, Alan Kennedy's QC Michael Sherwood (Jonathan Coy) tore Andrea apart on the witness box, causing the case to fall apart. With Kennedy walking free, DS Samantha Nixon slapped Andrea in the face.

Back at the station, Leela and Colin continued to clash, and when she called him a bigot over his remarks about terrorists, he proceeded to spit in her face. While Leela was reluctant to report him, having transferred from her last station for informing on a colleague, PC Tony Stamp went straight to Sergeant Dale Smith to report Colin, who was told by Inspector Gold he'd likely be fired. After clashing with Smithy over going to see Supt. Okaro, he stormed off, despite be warned his career would be over, responding that "It's over anyway". As he left the station, he barged into Ken and argued with him about his manners, setting off the station alarm to get out of the building. As Okaro returned and suspended Andrea, he told Ken to track Colin down and bring him back in. As Andrea cleared her locker, she convinced Smithy to get the final piece of evidence against Gabriel; a press clipping of the sniper with a photo of Gabriel, revealing the deranged copper was actually David Kent, the real Gabriel's adoptive brother. However, as she went to take it to Smithy, Gabriel caught up with her and found out she knew who he was. Dragging her into a storage room, he confessed to stealing his brother Gabriel's identity to get back at his birth mother, Sergeant June Ackland, for "inflicting" Gabriel on his family. As his confessions continued, she determined he was working hand in hand with the sniper to kill criminals, but she was completely unprepared for the revelation that he was responsible for killing PC Kerry Young, not the sniper.

Meanwhile, PC Reg Hollis waited at a train station for his girlfriend, SRO Marilyn Chambers, who was held up working in the station reception. Reg was planning to propose, but as he called, she said she was held up and would be there soon. As Ken caught up to Colin at a pub, they clashed over Colin's refusal to return to the station, and while Ken called into the station to say he was giving up on arresting Colin, he spotted him driving and went after him. Finding Colin at a garage, Ken tried to arrest Colin and was assaulted with the door of the van, knocking him unconscious. When Ken came to, he found himself in the back of the van, which had been loaded with petrol. Colin set out to drive into the front of Sun Hill to prove his comments about terror attacks were justified, and despite Ken's protests, he refused to back down. Back at the station, Andrea believed she had convinced Gabriel to confess to his crimes, only for them to be interrupted by the sound of the van crashing into the front office. In the front office, Smithy told Marilyn to escort a man out of the building, checking the van and finding Ken handcuffed in the back. Failing to open the door, he tried to get help for Ken, but he told him to leave the reception while he had the chance. As a fire started in the reception, the van exploded, causing a fireball to rip through the front of the building.

== Aftermath ==
The events of the following episode, Inferno (289), saw the station ablaze, with Gabriel unable to rescue Andrea, who had become trapped under a wall frame. Alongside the Sun Hill police officers and detectives, several non-policing emergency services including the fire brigade and ambulance were at the scene of the explosion. After deciding he could prevent being exposed once more, he left her to perish, rescuing Smithy from the front office to appear the hero. As the evacuation of all the police officers, detectives and the two male Asian suspects ensued, Gabriel began to feel guilty and tried to head back for Andrea, and he panicked after Supt. Okaro revealed a woman had been pulled from the building, but he later discovered it was Marilyn. After the evacuation had ended, one of the police cars was stolen by either of the Asian suspects. As Smithy came to in hospital, he told Tony that Ken was in the van, and his body was soon recovered. When Reg returned to Sun Hill, he discovered Marilyn was in hospital. As DI Manson returned to the station, he realised Andrea was missing, and Inspector Gold had the fire officers comb the building for her body. When she was found, Manson was left devastated. At the hospital, Reg proposed to an unconscious Marilyn, but he was left destroyed when she went into cardiac arrest and died. Back at a local community centre where the officers from Sun Hill were, DC Jim Carver discovered his wife, Sergeant June Ackland, was cheating on him with PC Roger Valentine. Jim stormed over to a pub in an attempt to get drunk, but he was talked down by Tony. As June and Roger showed up, Jim savagely attacked Roger before storming off, being pursued by a furious June. As they had a heart to heart, they were disrupted by a fight between a prostitute and her punter. As Jim detained the punter, June ran after the prostitute, and they spoke with their respective arrests. When the arrests were picked up, Jim told June the recent deaths of Ken and his ex-wife Marie, on top of her affair, was reason enough for him to leave London.

== Cast changes ==
Five regular cast members left during the events of the storyline, while three new characters were introduced in the weeks following the events of the station fire.

- DC Ken Drummond: Died as a result of the fire in Episode 288
- PC Andrea Dunbar: Died as a result of the fire in Episode 289
- SRO Marilyn Chambers: Died as a result of the fire in Episode 289
- DC Jim Carver: Exited after Ken's death and the revelation that his wife June was having an affair
- PCSO Colin Fairfax: Jailed in Episode 291 for starting the station fire
- DI Neil Manson: Made temporary exit in Episode 292 to privately grieve, after Supt. Okaro discovered his affair with Andrea
- SRO Julian "JT" Tavell: Made first appearance in Episode 296
- PC Dan Casper: Made first appearance in Episode 286, joined Sun Hill in Episode 298
- DC Zain Nadir: Made first (uncredited) appearance in Episode 300
