= James Clyde (actor) =

British actor

- Born: May 1961 (age 64–65); England, UK
- Occupation: Actor
- Years active: 1990–present

James Daniel McCallum Clyde (born May 1961) is an English actor, best known for his work in Anonymous, Croupier, Boudica and the CBBC's series Leonardo as Piero de' Medici. He also performed as Phillip Strenger in the English version of The Witcher 3: Wild Hunt. On stage, he appeared in Mr Thomas by Kathy Burke in 1990.

Clyde is the son of the actor and musician Gordon Clyde; he was educated at Highgate School.

== Filmography ==
Year	Title	Role	Notes
1990	Made in Heaven	Sean	1 episode
1990	Cluedo	Ken the Chauffeur	1 episode
1992	Maigret	Jean Metayer	1 episode
1993	In Suspicious Circumstances	Michael Stephen	1 episode
1993	Between the Lines	P.C. Tulloch	1 episode
1995	Backup	Foxton	3 episodes
1996-2008	The Bill	Alan Kennedy/Les Cooper/Patrick Meyers	12 episodes
1997	Wokenwell	Ollie	1 episode
1998	Crupier	Gordon	
2002	The Honeytrap	Carlo	Short
2003	Boudica	Roman Sergeant	
2008	New Tricks	Jonathan Iley	1 episode
2011	Above Suspicion	Julias D'Anton / Julian D'Anton	3 episodes
2011	Anonymous	King James I	
2012	Leonardo	Piero de' Medici	13 episodes
2013	Inheritance	Alan Blake	Short
2015	The Witcher 3: Wild Hunt	The Bloody Baron aka Phillip Strenger	Voice
2017	Nioh	Derrick the Executioner	Voice
2026	Resident Evil Requiem	Oswell E. Spencer	Voice
