= James Barriscale =

British actor, writer, director (born 1969)

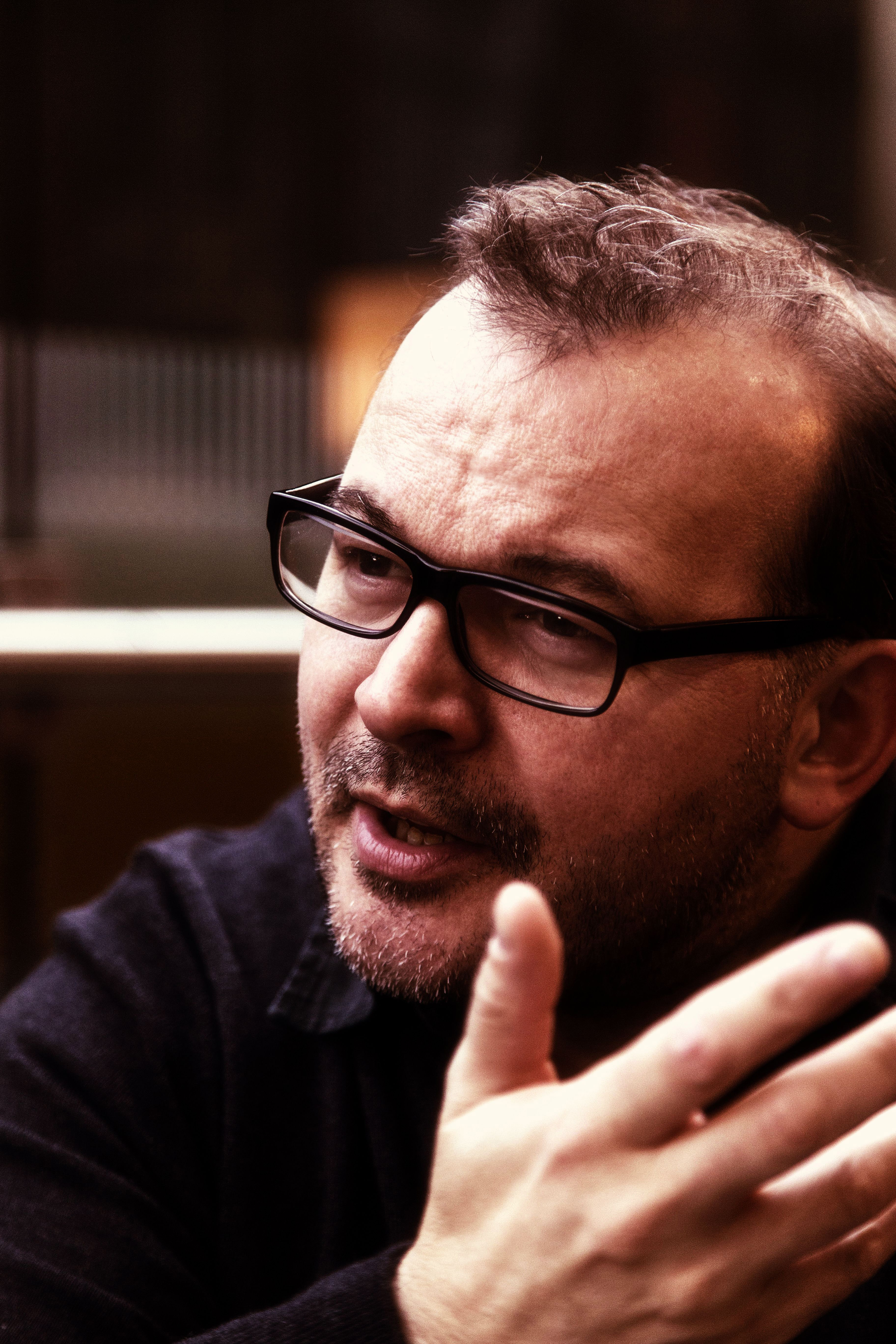
- Barriscale in 2013
- Born: 11 May 1969 (age 56)
- Occupations: Actor; writer; director

James Barriscale (born 11 May 1969) is a British actor, writer and director.

== Life and career ==
Barriscale appeared in the 2019 movie Terminator: Dark Fate. He appeared in an episode of The Alienist for Netflix, playing Sgt. Kelly. He played "The General" in Armando Iannucci's period comedy-drama film The Death of Stalin, which chronicles the events that transpired after the death of Joseph Stalin in 1953. Barriscale starred as Deputy Michaels in Rob Cohen's Action Blockbuster The Hurricane Heist.

Barriscale trained at Bristol Old Vic Theatre School, graduating in 1993, at which point he began his professional career by touring alongside Alan Cumming in a production of Hamlet, directed by Stephen Unwin, with English Touring Theatre (ETT). The production toured the UK before playing at Donmar Warehouse in the West End. From 1994-95, he was part of the Royal Shakespeare Company, with which he appeared in Shakespeare's Twelfth Night, directed by Ian Judge; The Wives' Excuse, directed by Max Stafford-Clark; and The Broken Heart, directed by Michael Boyd, all at the Stratford-Upon-Avon, Newcastle, and London seasons, as well as during the RSC's brief spell at The Young Vic Theatre.

He landed a starring role on television as Desk Sergeant John Swift in WPC 56, as well as having undertaken many guest roles in popular television shows, including EastEnders; The Bill – as two different lead guest roles – Vince Foster and latterly The Real Gabriel Kent opposite Todd Carty's psychopathic imposter Gabriel Kent over six episodes which culminated in a live finale; Messiah; Cherished; Banana, for which Barriscale was interviewed by Red Carpet News channel; The Vice; Spooks; A Touch of Frost; Murphy's Law; The Broker's Man; and five times in different guest roles in both Casualty and Holby City. In 2007, Barriscale portrayed Princess Diana's bodyguard, Kez Wingfield, in television movie Diana: Last Days of a Princess. Barriscale is a television season regular on Wizards vs Aliens, playing "Mr Fisher", a science teacher at King's Park High.

In 2007, he played the role of Duke de la Trémouille in George Bernard Shaw's Saint Joan, directed by Marianne Elliot, at Royal National Theatre. He was invited to stay with The National with their new show War Horse, playing Bone, Carter, Strauss and various other roles during two runs at The National, and then at New London Theatre in the West End, performing more than a thousand performances over a four-year period. Since then, he has appeared on TV as a grieving suspect in Silent Witness. In May 2021, he appeared in the BBC soap opera Doctors as Nathan Sallery.

== Voice artist ==
=== Video games ===
- Cassius in Assassin's Creed Origins
- Sherl, the talking dog, in Professor Layton's Layton's Mystery Journey: Katrielle and the Millionaires Conspiracy
- Bernard Loredo in The Witcher 2: Assassins of Kings
- Richard Clutterbuck in Assassin's Creed III
- Various characters in Assassin's Creed IV: Black Flag, Assassin's Creed Unity, Unity Dead Kings and Assassin's Creed Syndicate
- Mad commentator Franklin in The Last Story
- A host of characters in Fable III, Killzone 3, and The Adventures of Tin Tin: The Secret of the Unicorn
- Emile Chillon in Valiant Hearts

=== TV, radio and cinema voice work ===
Barriscale is a regular voice on Classic FM (UK), and voiced the second season of BBC1's The Sheriffs Are Coming, as well as many adverts on TV, radio and cinema, including Cadbury; Check My File; Esso; Betway; Peugeot; Barclays; HSBC; Knorr, Voltarol and BBC Breaking News

== Other work ==
Barriscale directed One Day, a 15-minute short film shot on 35mm, starring Tim McInnerny, Tanya Franks and Toby Stephens. It was produced by Stock-pot Productions.

== Filmography ==
Year	Title	Role	Notes
2001	Command Approved	Merchant officer hostage	
2017	The Death of Stalin	Army General	
2018	The Hurricane Heist	Deputy Michaels	
2019	Terminator: Dark Fate	US Border X-Ray Officer	
2021	Silent Witness	Gavin	Episode: "Redemption"
