= Kerry Young =

Kerry Young may refer to:

- Kerry Young (The Bill), a character in the British TV series The Bill
- Kerry Young (author) (born 1955), British writer
