= The Bill series 20 =

The Bill
- Series 20
- Series 20 DVD cover
- No. of episodes: 94

Release
- Original network: ITV
- Original release: 7 January – 30 December 2004

Series chronology
- ← Previous; Series 19 Next → Series 21

Series 20 of British television drama The Bill was broadcast from 7 January until 30 December 2004, and continued to use the serialized format introduced by Paul Marquess during Series 18.

== Spin-off ==
The series consists of 94 regular episodes, and two episodes from a new documentary spin-off, The Bill: Uncovered. The first part, Des & Reg, came when ex-PC Des Taviner returned after faking his death in an explosion in the previous series, with his capture for the fatal station fire in 2002 and eventual death in custody bringing an end to the plot that ran for nearly two years. The second, "Kerry's Story", came after the death of PC Kerry Young at the hands of PC Gabriel Kent. Kent took centre stage in series 20 as he established himself as a fully-fledged villain; he first colluded with a gang of thugs to beat up criminals who evaded justice before later colluding with a sniper to kill those who escaped justice. His murder of Young saw him frame the sniper by using his gun and method, having raped and bullied Young for refusing to embark on a relationship with him. Kent capped a year where his villainy dominated events by committing a second murder, throwing the sniper he colluded with off a fifth-storey balcony to his death to stop him from being arrested.

== Themes and storylines ==
In addition to the station fire plot, Series 20 saw the conclusion of another long-term storyline when Cathy Bradford's crimes surrounding her obsession with colleague Brandon Kane culminated in a showdown in the station basement. Renowned actress Lynda Bellingham joined the show as a series regular, portraying villainess Irene Radford, the matriarch of a crime family whose husband murdered DC Rob Thatcher's father in the 1980s, with Thatcher spending a majority of the plot trying to arrest members of the Radford family, later going on the run as part of his exit storyline. DS Samantha Nixon also took centre stage in a storyline that saw her daughter Abigail abducted by Samantha's ex-boyfriend Hugh Wallis, introduced as part of a long-running storyline targeting a serial rapist, a plot which would continue into series 21.

== Anniversary ==
As a celebration of the show's 21st anniversary, a special weekend of programmes were broadcast on UKTV Gold; The Bill @ 21 Weekend. UKTV Gold showed several classic episodes over the course of two days, with special scenes in between that gave the impression that several characters were reminiscing over the last 21 years at Sun Hill. Sergeant June Ackland, trainee DC Gary Best and PCs Tony Stamp and Reg Hollis were joined by former series regular George Garfield. As part of the anniversary celebrations, ITV broadcast two special episodes; Sergeant June Ackland and DC Jim Carver, who were the protagonists of the pilot Woodentop, married after being close friends for the entirety of their time at Sun Hill together. A second episode saw DCI Jack Meadows take a week's holiday to attend former DS Ted Roach's funeral – but, after suspecting Roach may have been murdered, he teams up with former Sergeants Alec Peters (Larry Dann) and Bob Cryer (Eric Richard) to find out the truth.

== Cast changes ==
As had become a regular occurrence under producer Paul Marquess, the cast frequently changed throughout the course of the series, with several characters arriving or exiting, although the series also aired a six-episode return for infamous ex-DS Don Beech. A majority of the characters that left were introduced by Marquess; however, established regulars Debbie McAllister, Nick Klein and Polly Page left after four, five and 12 years, respectively. While actress Lisa Geoghan chose to leave owing to family commitments, she was the fifth actor with over ten years' experience on the show to have left since Marquess took over; however, her character Polly Page was one of two not to be killed off as part of their exit storyline.

In 2024, executive producer Paul Marquess was interviewed about his work on The Bill in a three-part The Bill Podcast interview by Natalie Roles, who played DS Debbie McAllister (2000–2004), where he reveals a website was created urging for his death in response to the changes he made to the series.

On 16 October 2013, the complete series was released on DVD in Australia as a Region 0, playable anywhere in the world. The DVD synopsis removes all titles and tallies the episodes by number.

== Cast changes ==
=== Arrivals ===
- PC Andrea Dunbar ("Office Politics"–)
- PC Lance Powell ("Rookies and Professionals"–)
- SCP Jonathan Fox ("Rookies and Professionals"–)
- PCSO Laura Bryant ("Rogue Tourist"–)
- PC Steve Hunter ("The Start of a Problem"–)
- DC Suzie Sim ("The Pocket Cop"–)
- PC Roger Valentine ("Old Timer"–)
- PC Amber Johannsen ("Beginner's Luck"–)
- PC Leela Kapoor ("The Perfect Alibi"–)

=== Departures ===
- PC Cathy Bradford – Sent to a secure unit
- DC Brandon Kane – Resigns after Cathy Bradford is brought to justice
- DC Eva Sharpe – Accepts a transfer to MIT after being bullied by DI Neil Manson
- PC Des Taviner – Murdered by a crazed prisoner he was sharing a cell with
- PC Nick Klein – Entered into witness protection to escape from Dennis Weaver
- CADO Polly Page – Resigns after being warned not to pursue private investigations
- Laura Bryant – Temporary departure after ending allegiance with PC Gabriel Kent to run criminals off her local estate
- PC Cameron Tait – Returns to Australia after breakup with Kerry Young
- SCP Jonathan Fox – Temporary departure after realising Gina Gold didn't want to commit to their long-term relationship
- PC Kerry Young – Shot dead by PC Gabriel Kent, posing as the "Sun Hill Sniper"
- DS Debbie McAllister – Resigns to spend time with her son
- DC Rob Thatcher – Shot dead by SO19 after shooting Irene Radford

== Episodes ==
#	Title	Episode notes	Directed by	Written by	Original air date	Prod #
1	"Trust Means Nothing"	Michael Melia, Doña Croll and Kerry Godliman guest star	Nigel Keen	Damian Wayling	7 January 2004	181
Ackland and Best pull over a stolen vehicle, but the flustered driver claims he is the owner and ends up arrested after trying to hide a briefcase containing £20,000 in cash. After failing to convince Ackland to release him without question, he asks to speak to Gold, with Ackland amused to discover he is Gold's ex-boyfriend Harry Turner. Claiming the money belongs to a loan shark, Turner offers to wear a wire to catch him demanding money with menaces, but a concussed Harman blows the sting after staying at work against medical advice, having been assaulted by Bradford the day before. When Perkins identifies Turner as part of a stolen money scam, he asks for £15,000 of the Met's money to conduct a second sting, but the team soon find out they had a reason to be sceptical of his request. Kane struggles to comprehend the abduction of his children by Bradford, but while CID hunt tirelessly to find the deranged copper, they are unaware she is much closer than anticipated. Meanwhile, Smithy attends when Leo Price and his aunt are forced off the road in a hit and run.
2	"The Apple and the Tree"	Return of Polly Page; Doña Croll guest stars	Nigel Keen	Julian Perkins	8 January 2004	182
Manson investigates a series of incidents on the Cockroft Estate, and finds out that Kalisha Jarrett has taken over the dealing following the arrest of her son Joey. Smithy is determined to get Leo Price away from his twisted aunt, but events take a shocking turn when Leo's brother Wayne is critically injured in a hit and run. Leo gets a lucky result in court for his assault on Smithy, so he points Manson and Smithy in the right direction to bust Kalisha conducting a drug deal. However, events take a devastating turn for Leo, but Drummond thinks he has found the vital evidence to send Kalisha down. A minicab driver reports a sighting of Kane's children near the station, but the press attention is rife after Kent's exposure of Bradford's identity the day before. As the search ends up as a non-starter, Harman and Page get calls from Bradford as she reaches an end game, while she plays with the station heating in an attempt to lure a team to the station basement. Ackland visits Page in prison after her phone call from Bradford, revealing she could be released if Bradford is arrested; however, Page's joy is quickly quashed when Meadows reveals Bradford killed Max Wyatt. As a long day draws to a close, Harman and Ackland discover Bradford has been in the station all along.
3	"Kidnap and Ransom"	—	Robert Del Maestro	Patrea Smallacombe	14 January 2004	183
Okaro, Manson and Gold launch a major negotiation plan as Bradford is found in the station basement. Kane forces his way into the basement and refuses to listen to Gold's warnings about going in, securing the release of his son Jordan in exchange for himself. Once inside the basement, Kane secures Zoe's release, but his attempts to overpower Bradford result in him being stabbed. As Okaro calls in TSG and evacuates Sun Hill, Nixon and Sharpe investigate Bradford's background. Back in the boiler room, Bradford confesses to Tanya's murder and how all her lies were to get him on side, from her HIV scare to her phony miscarriage. While she continues to peddle false stories, Kane continues to try to break her down; however, she quickly realises it's all part of an escape plan, so she takes drastic action.
4	"Dawn Morning Light"	Final regular appearance of Cathy Bradford as PC; final appearance of DC Brandon Kane	Robert Del Maestro	Jake Riddell	15 January 2004	184
TSG storm the boiler room as Bradford starts a fire to kill herself and Kane, but it is quickly extinguished and she is arrested. Despite the events of the previous night, Kane returns to work the next day, but Harman gives him a reality check when he loses it with an elderly woman trying to commit insurance fraud. Best is seconded to CID, and paired with Perkins, the pair investigate the mugging of a city trader by two homeless ex-servicemen. Perkins is disgusted by the world the traders inhabit and is frustrated when he learns that the mugging was a revenge attack for a sick robbery of one of the homeless men. When Best goes out on his own initiative and almost blows the case, Perkins takes matters into his own hands in an attempt to recover the investigation. Meanwhile, Carver's wife Marie turns up in an attempt to stop him proceeding with the trial against her for domestic violence, later getting arrested for smashing the front window of the station.
5	"Saving Skin"	Final regular appearance of Marie Carver; Aml Ameen guest stars	Baz Taylor	Jaden Clark	21 January 2004	185
Stamp conducts an arrest of a regular tearaway, Curtis Wright, for a scam to rob curb crawlers. His partner in crime, Carla Andho, is reported missing by her reverend father. Despite his hatred of young Curtis, the reverend invites him around, only for Curtis to rob him. Despite only reporting a camera stolen, Wright goes out and buys a car with his takings, leading to the revelation that he stole £10,000 from the reverend. Sharpe is suspicious as to why it wasn't reported, and there's an even bigger shock when the accountant suspected of falsifying the books is Okaro's wife Denise. Things only get worse when Okaro discovers the new Borough Commander, Louise Campbell, announces that she is on her way to see him – and he panics that he will be berated for his neglect in the Bradford incident. Carver's wife takes the stand in court and tries to twist things by claiming self defence. Despite solid testimony from Carver and Kent, the case begins to unravel, leaving Carver fearful he will lose his job.
6	"Grave Error"	Return of PC Des Taviner; Geff Francis guest stars	Laurence Moody	Kathrine Smith	22 January 2004	186
Nixon is tasked with investigating a gang who are making and distributing fake DVDs; however, Thatcher makes an error on the warrant and the resulting raid on the wrong house leaves the team facing an official complaint. Nixon's investigations lead her to a pawn shop, where a stack of the fake DVDs are being prepared for shipping to a third-world country, but her determination to bring down the gun-toting leader of the gang leads to an unexpected tragedy. Meanwhile, Okaro faces a tough time as the fraud investigations into his wife Denise's finances continue, and she is arrested following the allegations of conspiracy to commit theft. With scandal-hungry journalists gathering like vultures, it seems things can get no worse when she admits she does harbour feelings for the Reverend Andho. Murphy returns from maternity leave, but gets a major shock when she spots Taviner outside the station.
7	"Shaken (Part One)"	—	Laurence Moody	Tom Needham	29 January 2004	187
Hemmingway deals with a hysterical woman who is found smashing up a shop. Discovering that she is a rape victim who is being traumatised and stalked by her attacker, Perkins and Sharpe step in to try to convince another of the rapist's victims to come forward and press charges after years of keeping quiet. Murphy is shaken by her sighting of Taviner the night before. Confused about why Taviner would come back to Sun Hill, Murphy becomes frantic when it appears baby Niamh has gone missing, but she is soon discovered safe and well. Murphy, determined to have a get together with estranged husband Patrick, asks Tait to baby-sit, only to make a horrific discovery when she returns home. Meanwhile, Okaro is forced to put his recent domestic troubles behind him and begins to build bridges with both the relief and his wife.
8	"Devastation & Remorse (Part Two)"	Alan Ford and Ben Kinsella guest star	Paul Walker	Maxwell Young	5 February 2004	188
Murphy is devastated when she arrives at home to find baby Niamh unresponsive. Accompanying her child to hospital, she is crushed when Niamh dies. Tait arrives just as the news breaks, and he goes on a bender as a result, causing him to be assaulted when squaring up to two men. Seeking solace in the arms of Young, he then faces Murphy to give her his statement, having overheard Murphy’s demands to see it. Meanwhile, Stamp and Harman arrest retired villain George Dooley for assaulting his future son-in-law; however, it soon transpires that there is much more to the case than first meets the eye. When his daughter Tina discovers George has taken his granddaughter off her babysitter, Tina goes after her father, leading to an armed showdown. Meanwhile, Carver questions his judgement after the revelation that Tina accused George of sexual assault when she was a child, while Sharpe begins to suspect Manson wants her out of CID.
9	"Forgiveness (Part Three)"	Paul Copley and Richard Mayes guest star	Paul Walker	Emma Goodwin	11 February 2004	189
Sharpe is assigned to what looks like a straightforward case of bigamy when two men are arrested fighting in the local library. After witnessing a fight in custody, the suspect Leonard Noakes, admits to murdering a man many years previously, but Sharpe finds Noakes' supposed victim alive but not-so-well in St Hugh's Hospital. As the case gets more intriguing, Sharpe finds herself under scrutiny from Manson, who orders her to leave the case to MIT. When DCI Ross requests her help, Sharpe can't help but tie up the loose ends, although a furious Manson warns her that her card is marked. Tait acts coldly towards Young after their unbridled night of passion, and Murphy apologizes for blaming him for Niamh’s death after the post mortem is released, but she gets a major shock when Taviner turns up on her doorstep.
10	"Career Ruining Secrets"	Brian Hibbard guest stars	Andy Goddard	Julian Perkins	12 February 2004	190
Following a tip-off from Perkins' snout, Manson goes undercover as a hitman for a woman who wants her husband killed. As De Costa investigates the domestic violence aspect of the case, the husband's involvement in a murder that has already been committed is revealed. Manson is delighted with the result, but De Costa is upset when Manson usurps her CSU authority. Murphy talks to Meadows and Gold after Taviner's appearance at her home the night before, but with Taviner aware his daughter has died, Gold sends Smithy and Hollis to the chapel of rest in case Taviner appears. As Smithy is called away, Taviner makes an appearance, with Hollis accidentally letting slip Tait's presence at Niamh's death. Meanwhile, Stamp and Best trawl internet chat rooms looking for 'Hotpants', a suspected fraudster who has ripped off a number of "her" on-line admirers.
11	"Betrayal"	90 minute special	Andy Goddard and Bob Tomson	Tom Needham and Maxwell Young	18 February 2004	191
Gold debriefs Hollis over Taviner's appearance at the chapel of rest. Discovering Hollis has known all along that Taviner started the station fire, Gold tries to stop him confessing all to DCI Ross and MIT. With Tait's life at risk after a death threat from Taviner, his return is less than straightforward when he is ambushed by a girl gang who steal his radio and trousers. Murphy prepares for the funeral of daughter Niamh. Ackland reluctantly agrees to attend for Meadows and Ross, but her betrayal is later exposed, leaving Murphy furious. With Tait grounded, Young, Harman and Hollis hunt the girl gang, suspecting they are colluding with a local shop owner to sell knockoff designer clothes, but one of the suspects become a victim when Taviner robs her for Tait's radio. Carver is left torn when he finds a copy of Kent's birth certificate, struggling over whether or not to inform Ackland. Meanwhile, Hollis and Chambers grow close at Niamh's wake.
12	"Running with Scissors"	—	Bob Tomson	Maxwell Young	19 February 2004	192
Following the abduction of Tait by Taviner, Gold tells Meadows and Okaro it's time to tell the relief about the station fire, with Kent on a one-man mission to find out why MIT are after Taviner. Murphy returns home to find Taviner, but with Meadows and McAllister close by, they scramble SO19 and air support. Despite the net closing in on Taviner, he gets into a tunnel and escapes, leaving Murphy behind. With the relief fully aware of Taviner's murderous history, fears grow that Tait won't be found alive. Nixon and Manson investigate a cigarette smuggling operation, but her frustrations about missing out on Manson's job leads her to clash with her new boss. Meanwhile, Carver confronts Ackland after discovering Kent is her long-lost son.
13	"Heartstrings"	Final appearance of DCI Andrew Ross; Abhin Galeya, Paul Bhattacharjee and Rupert Farley guest star	Bob Tomson	Marc Peirson	25 February 2004	193
Ackland reels after the discovery that Kent is her son. Pairing with Carver, they investigate a vicious assault on a shop owner, but her emotions soon get the better of her and she confronts Kent to get answers. As she backs him into a corner, he makes a shock admission. Meanwhile, Hunter continues the investigation into the assault on the shop owner, forced to admit he's been looking at the wrong suspect all along. Tait awakens in a dank warehouse as his ordeal at the hands of Taviner rumbles on. As Ross spearheads the manhunt, Tait tries tugging at Taviner's heartstrings to talk him down and secure his own freedom.
14	"New Year's Resolutions"	Polly Page becomes a CAD officer; Rowena Cooper and Anthony Bate guest star	Steve Kelly	Kathrine Smith	26 February 2004	194
Manson and Sharpe investigate the case of a missing girl, suspecting her estranged mother has taken her away. When she surfaces, a long buried family secret leads to the real kidnapper being unmasked. Page is released from prison, and is delighted when Okaro offers her a position as CAD officer. Ackland assists with Manson and Sharpe's investigation, but the imminent exposure of Kent is playing on her mind, and when Carver and Kent come to blows, things boil over. Smithy and Carver agree to keep quiet for Ackland's sake. Young confides in Hemmingway about her night of passion with Tait, and despite the fact it could be the start of something special, Smithy is not happy and threatens to stand in their way.
15	"Intrigue"	First appearance of DAC Roy Pearson; Jacqueline Leonard, Lloyd McGuire and Stephen North guest star	Steve Kelly	Steve Trafford	3 March 2004	195
Manson spearheads the search for escaped convict Eric Taylor, who breaks into his old home and assaults Smithy as he tries to make an arrest. When Taylor attacks his ex-wife and she is brought in for questioning, she launches a claim against Meadows for burying a witness statement that would've cleared Taylor's name. Nixon warns Meadows against the advice of Manson, convinced Manson is trying to oust him from CID. Sharpe does digging to nail Manson, but he quickly catches her out. A friend gives Meadows fuel for his fire against Manson's father in law, DAC Roy Pearson, but the reappearance of a pregnant Rachel Heath the night before her assault trial threatens to jeopardise his plans. Carver's investigations sees him find Taylor at the houseboat of the man who committed the murder he went down for, but a showdown at a swimming pool sees Carver dragged under the water. Kent watches on as his rival is drowning, but will he let it happen to silence him? Meanwhile, posing as house-buyer "June Carver", an emotional Ackland visits her long-lost son and meets her granddaughter; however, she struggles to admit who she is.
16	"Don't Bring Me Down"	Guest appearance of DC Mickey Webb; Lysette Anthony guest stars	Ken Grieve	Simon McCleave	4 March 2004	196
Rachel Heath stands trial for assaulting a burglar the previous summer. She tells Meadows before the trial that she is going to go public to clear her name, but he offers to confess all himself for the sake of their baby. Webb makes a return to testify in the trial, and after failing to dissuade Meadows from destroying his career for Rachel, confronts her in an attempt to make her face up to the assault charge. McAllister and Sharpe investigate an assault on a teenager working at a factory, discovering it is not only a racist assault, but homophobic. Meanwhile, Manson is mortified when Sharpe implies she knows about his father-in-law's sordid sexual practices involving rent boys, and so he confronts the DAC in an attempt to cover his own back. When a mischievous McAllister tells a seemingly uninterested Manson about Meadows having an affair with Rachel Heath, he uses it to blackmail Meadows, leaving Sharpe's days in CID numbered.
17	"Office Politics"	First appearance of PC Andrea Dunbar; final appearance of DC Eva Sharpe; guest appearance of DC Mickey Webb; Charles De'Ath and Shirin Taylor guest star	Ken Grieve	Gerard McKenna	10 March 2004	197
Young pairs with new probationer Andrea Dunbar as they attend the brutal stabbing of a teenage girl, but Dunbar is harbouring a major secret. Sharpe is paired with McAllister, but following a warning from Meadows that Manson wants her out of CID, Sharpe discovers McAllister blew the lid of Meadows having an affair with Rachel Heath; with Meadows unable to stop Sharpe's transfer, Sharpe lashes out at McAllister for causing her removal from Sun Hill. When Manson catches them in a full blown brawl, he drops the bombshell that the stabbing victim has died, before telling Sharpe she has to leave as soon as possible for starting the fight. Webb returns to investigate the stabbing for MIT, and he warns Sharpe not to expose Manson's father in law for using rent boys, but Webb soon delivers major news to Sharpe that leaves her delighted. The investigation into the stabbing leads to a broken marriage and friendship, but the revelation that the victim was pregnant throws the case upside down.
18	"Return of the Damned"	Elizabeth Rider, David Easter and Dorian Lough guest star	Chris Richards	Matthew Leys	11 March 2004	198
Klein and Hemmingway attend a disturbance at a funeral home and discover an unusual case; the body and casket of an elderly woman has been stolen. The Coombes brothers, sons of the victim, come under suspicion owing to the inclusion of their £350,000 inheritance inside the casket. Turning the case over to McAllister and Drummond, the investigation leans towards all the involved parties, including the brothers, the funeral director and the security guard. Meanwhile, local journalist Frank Fisher chases off a vandal who lobs a bottle at Page outside her house, and she befriends him despite warnings from Stamp. Smithy and Hollis check out the local swimming pool when the manager reports a break-in. Summoned back to the pool later on, Hollis is stunned as he is confronted by an armed Taviner. When Hollis goes missing, Gold launches a search, leading to Taviner's arrest for the station fire. With the Sun Hill team relieved, Murphy is left devastated, but no one at Sun Hill can imagine the events that follow Taviner's incarceration.
19	"End of the Road"	Final appearance of PC Des Taviner	Chris Richards	Nicholas McInerny	17 March 2004	199
Murphy is mortified when she finds her former lover Taviner unconscious in his cell after a vicious assault by his cellmate. Hollis is devastated at the discovery, and the relief are left in shock when Taviner dies upon arrival to hospital. MIT's arrival to investigate his firebombing of the station ends up as an investigation into his murder, and Murphy is left facing the loss of her career when MIT's DI guns for her, following the revelation that Taviner's cellmate has a history of mental health and violence. Okaro is livid when Bob Coles walks free, ending hopes he'd face alternative justice due for the siege that ended in the death of Best's father. Manson's plans to whisk his wife away to Paris fall through at the last minute, so he offers the tickets as incentive to nail Coles once and for all, pitting Hunter against Thatcher. Meanwhile, Page breaks down after hearing a prisoner screaming in custody, leading to a heart to heart with a grieving Hollis, who struggles to comprehend the death of his former best friend Taviner.
19a	"Des and Reg – Uncovered"	The Bill: Uncovered clipshow	Henry Klejdys	Julie Hill	17 March 2004	199A
Hollis returns home from work to find a VHS video which has been posted through his letterbox. The video, which was recorded just hours before Taviner's capture, is a personal message from Taviner to Hollis. On the video, Taviner explains that the noise of a police car is one he used to love, but now hates. He also explains that despite all of his misgivings, he did truly set out to be an upstanding member of the community and lay down the law. He also apologises for his part in the Sun Hill fire, and claims that Hollis was the best friend he ever had, leaving an emotional Hollis to realize exactly what his friendship with Taviner meant to him – despite recent events.
20	"Drive on By (Part One)"	Sally Faulkner and Peter de Jersey guest star	Brett Fallis	Jaden Clark	18 March 2004	200
Klein and Dunbar attend a serious assault. The victim comes to and claims to be suffering from amnesia, and when Klein tracks the man's sister, he discovers the victim is convicted child killer Brendan Bailey. Worse still, a young girl the same age as Bailey's victim has befriended him; however, he tries to push her away owing to his amnesia. Perkins assists Klein on the case, with Klein approaching Perkins about a transfer to PPU. The pair interview Ryan Moone, the father of a girl suspected to have been killed by Bailey whose body was never found, but while somebody else confesses to the assault, Ryan is found holding Bailey at gunpoint. Klein storms into the house to negotiate, but despite a mishap involving his radio going off, he talks Ryan down to save Bailey's life. However, that proves to be in vain when Bailey is subject to an ambush.
21	"Drive on By (Part Two)"	David Easter guest stars	Brett Fallis	Tom Needham	24 March 2004	201
Klein is horrified when Brendan Bailey is gunned down in a drive-by shooting. Klein battles to save Bailey's life, but he ultimately succumbs to his injuries. Hunter and Drummond interview the young girl whom Bailey was grooming prior to the attack, and while searching her photo album, Hunter finds a picture of his daughter, Maddison. When the young girl identifies herself as Dennis Weaver's goddaughter, Hunter shows Klein a file of mugshots of Weaver's associates, and Klein identifies the gunman as John Finnegan. When Hunter lets slip Klein's history with drugs to Weaver, his associates kidnap Klein and pump him full of heroin. Meanwhile, De Costa enlists the help of Page when a young boy from the Czech Republic is found amongst a group of yobs involved in an organised chain of football hooliganism.
22	"Crocodile Tears"	David Easter and Peter de Jersey guest star	Christopher King	Simon J Ashford	25 March 2004	202
Hunter is fearful when Klein doesn't show up for his shift. Tait and Young are called to a reported body in the middle of a common, and they're horrified as they identify the body as that of Klein, who is unconscious with a needle in his hand. Concerned Klein has relapsed, Meadows and Okaro try to keep his overdose secret from MIT's DI Madden; however, it's not long before he discovers Klein's past. Smithy pairs with Young to try to find where Klein was held by Weaver's thugs; however, her attitude riles Smithy. As Klein prepares to go into witness protection, he angrily confronts Hunter, who has been investigating a woman who turned up in hospital with a kidney missing. Hunter and Drummond track down a foreign doctor who has been performing surgeries off the record for criminals who are harvesting organs, owing to his homeland diploma not being valid in the U.K. As the woman in hospital dies, Hunter and Drummond go all out to find the person receiving the kidney through an unsafe surgery before it's too late.
23	"Cross Wires"	David Easter guest stars	Christopher King	Tom Higgins	31 March 2004	203
Young and Hemmingway arrest a young girl following an incident of criminal damage, but during the interview, she claims that she was raped the night before; however, Young struggles to focus after a drunken encounter with Smithy after splitting up with Tait. Thatcher and Drummond are assigned to the case, and they investigate a man seen following the victim on CCTV footage. However, when the man is given a rock solid alibi, Thatcher starts to doubt if the woman was raped at all, with his methods frustrating DeCosta. Meanwhile, Hollis investigates an allegation of assault by a schoolboy against his teacher, but when Hollis determines his story to be false, the young boy refuses to speak out against his real attackers. When he and Chambers go on a train-spotting date after their shift, they watch on as the young boy is set upon by a gang. Can they get backup in time to save the boy, or have they gotten things wrong?
24	"Smoking Gun (Part One)"	PC Jim Carver is transitioned to DC; Paul Putner guest stars	Nic Phillips	Mark Greig	1 April 2004	204
Manson organises an obbo on long-time villain Bryan Ferris, who is wanted following the stabbing of a dealer on the Parkmede Estate. Having received information that he is starting his own sideline in illegal substances, Manson raids a pub where he finds Ferris and his cronies in the middle of a deal. Ferris offers to give information on a bigger player in the chain, Ivan Grazdani, in return for leniency with his sentence. A search of Grazdani's hotel room yields a number of false passport applications signed off by a local district judge, Colin Wakeling. McAllister investigates a surprising link between Wakeling, Grazdani and none other than Manson himself. Tait witnesses a meeting between Hunter and Dennis Weaver.
25	"Smoking Gun (Part Two)"	Paul Putner and David Easter guest star	Nic Phillips	Mark Greig	7 April 2004	205
Klein puts his life at risk by eloping from the safehouse and returning to Sun Hill. Okaro allows him one final shift out on patrol, and he attends when a girl is found badly beaten. Realising she is a missing woman implicated in the human trafficking ring McAllister and Drummond have been investigating, he uses his own experiences to convince her to turn witness, with the man who trafficked her also wanted for a hit and run on the young son of one of his rivals the day before. McAllister is determined to see the case through to prove that Manson's close friend, District Judge Colin Wakeling, is involved. As his involvement comes to light, hopes of a prosecution are shuttered by a shocking turn of events. Meanwhile, Page discovers that her so called lover, Frank Fisher, is behind the harassment campaign against her.
26	"Settle the Score"	Final appearances of CADO Polly Page and PC Nick Klein; guest appearance of Cathy Bradford; Paul Putner and Harry Towb guest star	Crispin Reece	Colin Wyatt	8 April 2004	206
Hunter agrees to set up an operation to nail Dennis Weaver once and for all. With Klein back in the safe house, Weaver arranges a hit. Meeting with the hitman to retrieve the gun and a photo of Klein's body, Weaver realises Hunter has set him up when an arrest team swoop in on them. Escaping into North Canley Forest, a terrified Hunter barely escapes with his life as a maniacal Weaver swears revenge for his treachery, and it's the end of the line for Klein as a new identity and relocation through witness protection set up for his safety. Page is warned off by Ackland when she tries to investigate a forged driver's licence, but Stamp discovers her intuition may be correct after all. Disillusioned about her role as a CAD operator, Page decides to put her affairs in order and makes the decision to visit the person responsible for her downfall, ex-PC and former best friend Cathy Bradford. Meanwhile, Young and Hemmingway investigate a possible case of abuse at a local care home, where two of the residents are left badly shaken.
27	"Needing a Friend"	—	Crispin Reece	Paul Ebbs	14 April 2004	207
Smith and Young attend a call to a burglar seen attempting to gain access to a houseboat, but their arrival sparks the assailant into falling into the fast flowing river, forcing Smithy to jump in after him. A woman then arrives at the station to make a complaint of rape against the assailant, while he makes an official complaint against Smithy for "causing his fall". Meanwhile, Tait and Kent find a man badly injured after falling from the roof of a disused warehouse. Their investigations lead them to discover the organised crime of 'tramp bashing', where professionals pay homeless people sums of money to fight with one another. However, they soon discover that the fights are also used to film fights and sell them in X-Rated video stores.
28	"A Time and a Place (Part One)"	Louise Jameson guest stars	Sylvie Boden	Steve Griffiths	15 April 2004	208
With rumours about Smithy date-raping Young rife amongst the relief, his stint as acting duty officer looks to be a rough one as he struggles to maintain the respect of the relief. Young and Best attend a serious RTC in which a car has flipped onto its roof on a motorway slip road, but Best discovers the driver may be involved in a crime after the vehicle shows as stolen and a gun is found in the boot. Young accompanies the driver to hospital as Drummond and Perkins try to get answers, but the day spirals out of control as Stamp confirms an armed robbery in progress after a central station hold up alarm at a bank. Smithy attends and struggles to maintain control of the scene, with Tait confronting him about Young's alleged rape before the bank's manager forced onto the street with a bomb strapped to his waist. Young chaperones the manager, but the presence of his girlfriend, ex-wife of the robber, as well as Tait's insistence to talk about Young about her alleged rape, leads to disaster.
29	"A Time and a Place (Part Two)"	Louise Jameson guest stars	Sylvie Boden	Maxwell Young	21 April 2004	209
Young is found injured but alive in the rubble after the explosion behind the bank, but the booby-trapped bank manager is killed instantly. As Nixon and Carver investigate the aftermath, there is considerable question over where the blame will lie. Tait begs Young not to reveal that they were arguing when the bomb went off, but he later confesses to abandoning his post while letting slip Young's accusation of rape against Smithy, who comes under scrutiny after being in charge of the operation. Widower Julie Willets accuses Dunbar of saying the bomb was a fake after taking the probationer's words out of context. Meanwhile, Kent steals CCTV footage to protect Young, and Dunbar makes the first move to betray her new colleagues.
30	"Rookies & Professionals"	First appearances of PC Lance Powell and SCP Jonathan Fox; Linda Lusardi guest stars	Ged Maguire	Joe Fraser	22 April 2004	210
CID suspect an inside job when several industrial vehicles are stolen from a construction site. Best gets his first puppywalking assignment in the form of PC Lance Powell, but their strong work on the investigation is hampered by blowing a sting to catch the robbers. Young's rape claim is leaked to the press by Dunbar, who shifts blame onto a suspicious Kent by telling Gold she thinks he may be responsible. Banished to the Siberia of Sun Hill, the Cole Lane Estate, Kent discovers a group of kids harassing a transvestite resident, and resorts vigilante action after failing to get a statement against the ringleader. New CPS lawyer Jonathan Fox arrives a week early and clashes with Gold when she voices her disinterest in having an on-site CPS lawyer, but they end up bonding over their shared love of boxing. Meanwhile, Okaro asks Perkins to take on a major undercover case inside Hayesend Prison.
31	"Smoking Demons"	Return of ex-DS Don Beech; Ricci Harnett and Tony Haygarth guest star	Susan Tully	Julian Perkins	29 April 2004	211
Perkins goes undercover in prison, where he investigates convicted child sex offender Charles Mawdsley, who is believed to be running a paedophile ring with the help of one of the prison guards. De Costa appears as a prison counsellor, acting as Perkins' contact with the outside world, but when Perkins opens up in a group therapy session, De Costa begins to suspect that he was abused as a child. By arresting a corrupt guard who was dealing drugs, Okaro hopes to force Mawdsley to play his hand, but in interview, the guard reveals that he was only bringing drugs in and securing extra privileges for Mawdsley. Meanwhile, Manson receives a call from a prisoner at the same nick who wants to pass on information about a planned robbery, former Sun Hill DS and cop killer Don Beech.
32	"Reliable Information"	Peter O'Brien and Peter de Jersey guest star	Ged Maguire	Tony McHale	30 April 2004	212
Nixon and McAllister investigate when the stolen digger turns up at a transport site. Manson's suspicions are proven to be correct, but nobody else knows that Manson's tip-offs are coming from Beech. The arrival of DI Peter Cavanaugh of NCIS leaves Harman, Nixon and McAllister lovestruck, but Meadows is furious when Manson's liaisons with Beech are revealed. Powell arrests a black teenager on suspicion of shoplifting, but the interference of black-rights activist Jerome Taylor leaves Okaro unleashing his fury on Powell, with Thatcher and Dunbar intrigued as they launch separate investigations into whether or not Okaro is a racist.
33	"The Cautious Approach"	Peter O'Brien, Tony Haygarth, Manjinder Virk and Shobu Kapoor guest star	Martin Hutchings	Dawn Harrison	6 May 2004	213
CID and SO19 lie in wait for Trevor Little's team to pull off the diamond robbery, but when the raid is aborted at the last minute, Beech's information to Manson isn't looking so kosher. Meadows warns Manson away from Beech, but Manson goes to see him again when he is beaten up in prison. Young is under pressure from Gold to make a decision about whether to make her rape allegation against Smithy official. Young then assists De Costa when a young Asian girl is raped, but refuses to testify. Kent investigates a break-in on the Cole Lane Estate, but he is left furious when Carver discovers that the victim's boyfriend, Roy Stafford, was previously arrested on child sex offences.
34	"Rogue Tourist"	First appearance of Laura Bryant; Peter O'Brien and Tony Haygarth guest star	Martin Hutchings	Chris Webb	7 May 2004	214
After failing to capture Trevor Little and his gang after their aborted diamond raid, Manson begins to have his doubts about Cavanaugh, and suspects he may be leaking information to the gang. The rivalry between the two inspectors escalates, but Cavanaugh has his eye set on Nixon, and he soon uses her to provide info on a new raid. Kent continues his quest to bring down suspected paedophile Roy Stafford, telling the kids on the Cole Lane Estate, leading to a lynchmob spearheaded by local mother Laura Bryant. As Carver and Drummond prove Stafford organised the robbery of his girlfriend's home so she and her grandkids move in, he takes the law into his own hands as the evidence fails to stack up. Meanwhile, Okaro receives further racist hate mail, and the verbal sparring between Gold and Fox turns into unexpected passion.
35	"Robbery, Act II"	Peter O'Brien and Tony Haygarth guest star	Dermot Boyd	Nicholas McInerny	19 May 2004	215
Manson's suspicions about Cavanaugh continue during an obbo on the diamond heist suspects. When the replica diamonds are held up and a police launch is used by the gang, Manson orders Hunter to privately get involved. With Nixon and Tait undercover as staff onboard the diamond boat, and the gang armed, Manson is furious at Cavanaugh's discrediting of the gang using firearms. When the suspects work out that police are on board, Hunter has to make himself the hero to save Nixon and Tait. Kent finds himself in trouble when Roy Stafford turns up at the station to report his assault. Gold is delighted that she may be able to get rid of Kent at last, but Laura Bryant gives him an alibi, in exchange for setting up a vigilante group to beat up criminals. Meanwhile, Fox asks Gold out on a date, and Okaro continues to receive hate mail.
36	"Nemesis"	Final appearance of Don Beech; Peter O'Brien, Melanie Gutteridge and Linda Lusardi guest star	Dermot Boyd	Julian Perkins	20 May 2004	216
Manson goes back to the prison, this time with an unhappy Meadows in tow, intent on getting evidence from Beech about Cavanaugh's corruption. A tape is delivered, but it is inconclusive. As Cavanaugh tries to take Trevor Little out of custody, Nixon finds herself "suspended" in an attempt to expose Cavanaugh, but Beech's demands to be moved to a prison that day jeopardises the chance of getting the evidence secured. As Cavanaugh abducts Nixon, Manson takes the bait to get Cavanaugh's escape plan, escorting Beech to girlfriend Maggie Black's home under guard of TSG. As they are called away, Hunter and Manson keep him in custody at Black's home, unaware that the mischievous Beech has things exactly as they want them. Meanwhile, Powell and Hemmingway are on scene when a young girl is brutally attacked with a knife in a wooded area, suspecting she was a victim of attempted rape. With two other confirmed rapes on the patch, De Costa takes her suspicions to Manson that there may be a serial rapist operating in the area.
37	"Taking Flak"	Peter O'Brien guest stars	Susan Tully	Tom Needham	27 May 2004	217
Thatcher and Drummond are on an overnight obbo, watching the flat of a crucial witness in a fraud case, when Drummond's teenage son Alex shows up, claiming to have caused the death of a prostitute. His life begins to collapse around his ears when his distraught son volunteers a full confession, and then threatens to jump to his death from a warehouse roof. Meadows is left furious at the news of Beech's escape, with Nixon haunted by the memory of her recent relationship with corrupt copper Cavanaugh. When Manson and Meadows interview him, he tells Meadows that Manson deliberately let Beech escape from custody. With little evidence to prove his own innocence, Manson is forced to sit back and take the allegations being thrown at him as the DPS start a full-blown investigation.
38	"Game Over"	—	Bob Tomson	Tom Higgins	2 June 2004	218
CID launch a manhunt when a car is stolen with a young baby in the back. Stamp and Dunbar catch up to the car but lose it in pursuit; however, their efforts prove not to be in vain as they track down the thief. With no baby found, he claims his girlfriend has claimed the child as her own, and that she is suffering from depression after a stillbirth. Drummond goes all out to find the child in an attempt to take his mind off son Alex's incarceration for manslaughter, but he plays a key role in the case before getting some unexpected news about Alex's conviction. Kent and Young attend when a woman causes a disturbance outside her ex-boyfriend's home. When she is admitted to hospital with stab wounds, she confides in Kent that her boyfriend is blackmailing her about some nude photographs he took; Kent later cons Young into taking the suspect on a date so he can break into his home. Meanwhile, Manson is reprimanded by Okaro and Meadows after being cleared of aiding Beech's escape, with Hunter letting slip exactly how Beech escaped, only to have a major bombshell dropped on him when Christine Weaver is assaulted and hospitalised.
39	"The Tunnel (Part One)"	First appearance of Sgt Marc Rollins; Lenora Crichlow guest stars	Bob Tomson	Tony McHale	3 June 2004	219
Hunter is desperate to find his daughter Madison, who has been abducted by Dennis Weaver. Meadows orders him not to get involved in the investigation, and assigns Nixon to keep an eye on him. They investigate when a kilo of cocaine is found following a car chase. Hemmingway arrests a 17-year-old girl, Shirley Moss, on shoplifting charges and forms a bond with the girl when Shirley tells her she's pregnant. Hemmingway convinces the shopkeeper to drop the charges, and when the father of Shirley's child turns out to be big-time drug dealer Rifkin, Nixon and Hunter organise an SO19 raid on Rifkin's flat; however, with drug courier Sonny and Shirley both in police custody, they discover Rifkin has his bases covered.
40	"The Tunnel (Part Two)"	Final appearance of Dennis Weaver; Lenora Crichlow guest stars	Christopher King	Graham Mitchell	9 June 2004	220
Nixon drags a wounded Hunter into an abandoned Tube tunnel after he is shot by Dennis Weaver. As they hide away from Weaver, the pair end up clashing as they discuss their past feuds, but Nixon soon puts her differences to one side in an attempt to get Hunter out alive. As McAllister realises her colleagues are missing, Manson tracks down the informant who lured Hunter into the ambush. As SO19 coordinate a raid on the tunnels, a gunshot is heard; has Weaver found Hunter and Nixon before SO19? Meanwhile, Hemmingway is frustrated as Shirley Moss is seriously assaulted, having been told by Okaro that she was not allowed to take Moss in. Thatcher's interest is piqued when he witnesses Hemmingway clash with Okaro, but Hemmingway is unwilling to back down as she pursues Stuart Rifkin; while the chances of getting drugs charges to stick fade, the revelation that Shirley is underage gives Hemmingway a different lead to chase. Meanwhile, Tait and Young investigate a "car-clamp vigilante", but Young soon finds herself in danger from none other than Kent.
41	"Twisting the Truth"	Josh Herdman guest stars	Christopher King	Steve Trafford	10 June 2004	221
Young is in turmoil after her rape at the hands of Kent. Naturally, he denies the charge, and insinuates that Young has "cried wolf" before, when she accused Smithy of rape. Confiding in fiancé Tait, Young is shocked when he doesn't believe her story. He insists she makes the allegation official if they are to stay together, but Young is reluctant to do so after the incident with Smithy. Nixon must decide whether to defend Hunter after his fatal shooting of Dennis Weaver during the tunnel ordeal. As the only witness, Nixon can clear Hunter's name if she confirms Weaver was killed in self-defence. Meanwhile, Carver and McAllister investigate when a teenager is arrested for assaulting a man with a needle, suspecting he is both dealing and using steroids.
42	"Insensitivity (Part One)"	First appearance of Dr. Hugh Wallis; Tony Selby and Peter de Jersey guest star	N G Bristow	Tom Needham	17 June 2004	222
Kent's vigilante actions on the Cole Lane Estate spiral out of control when he arranges for his gang to attack two black youths for mugging an elderly Asian lady, who is left terrified by the ordeal to testify. With key ally Laura Bryant turning against him, he must act quickly to ensure his involvement is not discovered. Nixon is reunited with boyfriend Hugh Wallis, who has come to Sun Hill from the Met's profiling team to investigate the serial rapist operating in the area. Murphy is in court on the case of a drink-driving Rastafarian she arrested for refusing a blood test, and is humiliated when the case is thrown out of court, and she is accused of racism. Jerome Taylor alerts the Borough Commander to the case, and Okaro is forced to offer Murphy a transfer or demotion. Tait and Harman spot a man in a bear outfit standing on a motorway sign, and as they negotiate, they discover he is plotting to firebomb his old home to get revenge on his wife. However, their day gets worse when a seemingly straightforward case of two young children locked in their grandfather's car turns into a deadly accident.
43	"Insensitivity (Part Two)"	Sgt Sheelagh Murphy is demoted to PC; departure of Laura Bryant; first appearance of Irene Radford; Tony Selby and Philip McGough guest star	N G Bristow	Tom Needham	24 June 2004	223
Tait launches himself into the river to rescue two children from a sinking car, but he is dealt a double blow when he first can't rescue one of the children, then when the one he could rescue dies in hospital. Kent's vigilante actions on the Cole Lane Estate look like being his undoing when primary supporter Laura Bryant decides he's crossed the line, and reports his actions to Thatcher. As Thatcher and Drummond follow up Laura's allegations, Kent's accomplice Kev is found beaten and locked in the boot of a car. Drummond sees Irene Radford, head of a ruthless crime family on the estate, and it looks as though the Radfords are running a protection racket on the Cole Lane. McAllister leads a raid to arrest an aggravated burglary suspect, and Nixon realises he fits the profile of their serial rapist. Hunter returns to work after his shooting, and his colleagues in CID are amused when Manson assigns him to CSU with DeCosta on holiday.
44	"The Start of a Problem"	First appearances of PC Steve Hunter and David Radford	David Holroyd	Tony McHale	30 June 2004	224
Thatcher is keeping a close eye on the Radfords, despite the warnings of his colleagues. He eagerly arrests David Radford for selling bootleg DVDs on the Cole Lane Estate, but when David's mother Irene turns up with a proof of purchase, Thatcher knows he's been set up. Hunter takes over the running of CSU, and despite Carver's misgivings, his forceful manner gets results when he convinces a reluctant and pregnant domestic violence victim to testify. When a casino punter is mugged after a large win, Carver organises an undercover operation with Tait and Harman, but Carver soon finds himself getting hooked on the buzz of winning. Young returns to the station to declare her love to Tait, unaware he is getting closer to Harman, with both grieving for the children who died in the car sinking.
45	"Puppywalking"	Peter de Jersey guest stars	David Holroyd	Nick Saltrese	7 July 2004	225
Hemmingway accompanies probationer Steve Hunter on his first day at Sun Hill, and eager to impress, he lets slip some juicy gossip about his brother's impotency. The furious sergeant demands his brother be transferred to another station, but desperate to make amends, the rookie constable follows up an informant's info on a bootleg alcohol ring. Young boldly confronts Kent at his flat in an attempt to record him admitting to her rape. Murphy and Powell investigate when homophobic graffiti is scrawled over a restaurateur's car and business. The man insists he isn't gay, but when they check the CCTV, Murphy is shocked when it leads them to a friend of her son, Conor. A high-speed chase ends in disaster for Ackland.
46	"Second Strike (Part One)"	Maurice Roëves guest stars	Sylvie Boden	Jake Riddell	8 July 2004	226
Ackland is rushed to hospital after being run down by the Area Car. Carver is devastated to learn what has happened to his oldest friend, and soon offends Stamp by cruelly mentioning his previous incident of running somebody down with the Area Car. Best gets an offer from DCI Bill Wicklow of the OCG to go undercover to ensnare a dealer his brother Joe is working for. He ends up being assaulted by his brother and his gang when he goes to see him, but after letting one of his friends escape a shoplifting charge, Joe's boss Lenny Boswell offers to bring him into his football hooliganism gang. After getting arrested for starting a fight in a pub, Best is praised by his handler, DI Henry, while Boswell is impressed. Asking him to go visit one of his loan shark clients, Best's handling of the job gets him involved in a bigger job; robbing a Greek drug runner for his merchandise. When Joe becomes resentful of his brother "invading his world", he hatches a plan to double cross Boswell's crew, with Best fearing the worst when he finds the OCG team at the triple murder of Boswell's crew.
47	"Second Strike (Part Two)"	Josef Altin and Maurice Roëves guest star	Sylvie Boden	Jake Riddell	14 July 2004	227
Best tries to hunt down his brother Joe following the murder of Boswell's crew. Best is left torn after visiting Joe's girlfriend, Elaine, discovering Joe inflicted her injuries. As he leaves the hospital, he finds Joe's best friend Degsy being dropped off by a cab with serious injuries, having been found by Boswell. He manages to track Joe down and discovers that George Andreakos gunned down Boswell's crew, and his investigation takes him to Barry Jones. When Best finds a phone registered to Jones in DI Henry's desk, he suspects he is corrupt, but he is thrown off the case after taking his accusations to DCI Wicklow. After being dismissed by OCG, Best tracks down Elaine and Joe down at Boswell's cousin, and Boswell soon makes an appearance, armed with a shotgun. Meanwhile, Stamp is fearful when a witness comes forward who claims he didn't have eyes on the road when he hit Ackland, but Carver makes a breakthrough that could give Stamp hope. Ackland comes round and clashes with both Stamp and Carver, Stamp making the admission that the collision was his fault, while Carver opens up on his feelings for her.
48	"Jigsaw Puzzle"	Lynn Ferguson and Geraldine Fitzgerald guest star	Laurence Moody	Matthew Leys	15 July 2004	228
Nixon and Wallis concentrate on the Royal Navy link to the serial rapist, and interview a Scottish prostitute whose rape in the late 1980s previously matches the profile – and may have started the rapist off. Dunbar hides a press clipping of an article she wrote about the incident, but fears for her cover when a journalist colleague arrives at the station to interview Powell as the 'new face of Sun Hill'. Powell investigates what looks like another homophobic hate crime when a man is attacked outside a gay club. Murphy is shocked when she recognises her son Conor on the CCTV, and Powell is forced to arrest Conor for GBH. Carver and Harman investigate when a fortuneteller has her crystal ball stolen.
49	"Blind Detection"	James Clyde guest stars	Laurence Moody	Damian Wayling	21 July 2004	229
Nixon manages to identify a prime suspect as the serial rapist, Alan Kennedy. Nixon is left fearful when a construction worker witnesses an apparent abduction near the scene of the latest attack, raising the horrifying concept that Kennedy may have gone a step forward. In her quest for revenge, Young shows one of the victims a picture of Kent – and then confronts him by telling him that she is determined to prove that he is the rapist, unaware he has already been identified. Meanwhile, Thatcher continues pursuing his vendetta against the Radford clan as he seizes the chance to investigate when Wayne Radford is carjacked and then handcuffed to a clapped out banger. Murphy is furious when Powell suggests that her son might be gay – which could reveal the reasons behind his behaviour.
50	"The Rapture"	Final appearance of PC Cameron Tait; James Clyde guest stars	Brett Fallis	Jaden Clark	22 July 2004	230
Serial rape prime suspect Alan Kennedy finds the net is closing in around him, but CID are not impressed when raids on his flat, allotment and deceased mother's house all fail to turn up any leads. With fears high over the missing girl abducted near the scene increasing by the minute, Manson soon discovers all is not as it seems when Harman attends the scene of a robbery. Fox warns that more than just forensic evidence is needed to prosecute Kennedy, and reluctant witness Khadija Miah is brought into the station to identify him as her assailant. However, when Khadija runs into Kent, Young realises she could lose her job over the fact that she may have "tainted" the witness by showing her Kent's photograph. Tait's job is also on the line after his attack on Kent, and Gold does her utmost to convince her nemesis to consider dropping the charges.
51	"Cause and Effect"	Kacey Clarke and James Clyde guest star	Brett Fallis	Nicholas McInerny	28 July 2004	231
With insufficient forensic evidence to charge serial rape suspect Alan Kennedy, Manson and Nixon have just twenty-four hours to extract a confession from him. Fox, who previously defended Kennedy on an assault charge, watches the proceedings with great interest, but he jeopardises his relationship with Gold when he makes a comment about her not having children. With CID scouring Kennedy's mother's house for forensic evidence, Manson and Nixon continue their interview strategy. As time runs out, the search team start tearing apart his mother's house in an attempt to find the crucial evidence, while Nixon begins to break down an emotional Kennedy by digging into his childhood. The relief prepare for a summer party, unaware that disaster lies ahead.
52	"Bite the Bullet (Part One)"	PC Gary Best is transitioned to DC; Freema Agyeman, Lysette Anthony and Peter de Jersey guest star	Menhaj Huda	Julian Perkins	29 July 2004	232
Following an explosion at the station's summer party, Manson orders Stamp and Powell to stay out of the wreckage of the pub, but when Stamp realises Okaro is still inside, he risks his life to rescue him. Unaware of the chaos nearby, Thatcher slips another racist hate letter into Okaro's internal mail. When it looks like Okaro was the bomb's intended target, Thatcher and Jerome Taylor realise their letter campaign could be their undoing. Thatcher discovers CCTV footage of one of the Radford boys near the pub at the time of the explosion, but his lone ranger tactics see him follow the Radfords into a trap. Meadows takes charge when Rachel Heath's baby is kidnapped by a religious fanatic, with the DCI forced to re-evaluate his life and career when Rachel admits he is the father of her baby.
53	"Bite the Bullet (Part Two)"	Tim Plester, Lysette Anthony and Peter de Jersey guest star	Menhaj Huda	Steve Griffiths	4 August 2004	233
After a series of threatening texts imply Powell was the intended target for the bomb, he looks into the people who have his new phone number: his family, his boyfriend, and Murphy's son Conor. He tells Murphy about his suspicions, and she is disgusted that he could think her son could be capable of the bombing. Meadows leads a search on Murphy's house, and the phone used to send the message is found in Conor's room. With all the evidence pointing away from Jerome Taylor, Gold tries to convince Okaro to apologise for pointing the finger at his arch-rival; however, he refuses to be swayed. With his career potentially on the line, Fox goes with Gold in an attempt to change his mind. Having ended their relationship the day before, Fox is surprised when Gold opens up in an attempt to revive their relationship. Meanwhile, Best pairs with Thatcher and Drummond to investigate a robbery, but they soon discover the victim has been dealing drugs. With his boss escaping capture during a sting, Best is sent undercover in order to nail him.
54	"On the Wrong Side of the Fence"	Lysette Anthony guest stars	Nigel Keen	James Stevenson	5 August 2004	234
Murphy and Powell deal with a domestic violence case involving two gay men, but when they hand the case on to CSU, Hunter convinces the victim not to proceed. When Conor doesn't come home, Murphy accompanies Powell and Rollins on a night out at a gay club to find him, where they witness an incident that gives them further evidence on the case. McAllister is determined to prove that Meadows is making a mistake by reconciling with Rachel Heath. To prove Rachel is still "on the game", she gets Best to call Rachel and make an appointment at a hotel. When Meadows confronts her, she denies that the meeting was for her purpose. Thatcher and Drummond investigate an arson attack on an ice-cream van business, and while their hopes are raised by a link to the Radfords, they are horrified when the business owner is killed in a hit-and-run.
55	"A Solemn Song"	Lysette Anthony guest stars	Nigel Keen	Jake Riddell	11 August 2004	235
Young and Dunbar pursue a stolen car and find the injured owner, a suspected gang member, in his own boot. Drummond meets a contact in the local gang scene, suspected of being a main rival, but he is gunned down during their meeting. Thatcher is thrilled when a link is made between the gang and Wayne Radford, but the discovery of this leads to the gang's leader and shooting victim holding one of his associates at gunpoint, leaving Dunbar looking down the barrel of a gun. Rachel Heath exacts a violent revenge on Martin Granger, convinced he was responsible for telling Meadows about her continuing involvement in the vice trade, with Meadows unaware that none other than a scheming McAllister is behind the betrayal. Meanwhile, De Costa returns to CSU and is appalled by the way Hunter has handled things in her absence.
56	"Hope"	Adjoa Andoh, Tiana Benjamin and Peter de Jersey guest star	Julie Edwards	Stuart Blackburn	12 August 2004	236
Okaro is furious when he discovers that Thatcher has asked Young to go undercover with the Radfords without prior permission. Ackland returns to work after being hit by the Area Car, despite the fact that she is preparing to marry Carver, and Gold makes a grand gesture after she receives an unwanted gift. Nixon's daughter gets involved with a local criminal, much to her dismay. Meadows decides to apply for custody of his son with Rachel Heath after she is jailed for GBH, but McAllister tries to dissuade him by telling him being a single parent isn't as easy as he thinks it is. Young leaves work early and continues liaising with David Radford, having been refused the chance to go undercover officially.
AN1	"The Bill @ 21 Weekend (Part One)"	—	Henry Klejdys	Julie Hill	14 August 2004	AN1
Ackland, Hollis and Best find it a quiet night at the station, so Reg digs out a photo album with memories and they tell Best some of the most dramatic moments of the past twenty-one years, including a sniper with a grudge against Ackland, DI Burnside receiving stick from DCI Reid, DC Lines' children being held up in a bank robbery, PC Ramsey being shot and DS Roach being fired for punching Inspector Monroe. (Special presentation, with a full reprise of the episodes "New Moves", "Fat'Ac", "The Short Straw", "Dinosaur", "Punch Drunk", "Don't Like Mondays", "Still Waters", "Repossession", "Tinderbox", "Video Nasty", "Bad Pictures", "Fire", "All Tucked Up" and "Bait".) This presentation was broadcast on UKTV Gold.
AN2	"The Bill @ 21 Weekend (Part Two)"	—	Henry Klejdys	Julie Hill	15 August 2004	AN2
Stamp brings surprise guest in to custody – former PC George Garfield, and he joins Ackland in reminiscing about the past. Ackland recalls the death of PC Melvin, a large HGV tanker spewing its load over the streets of Sun Hill, and the station firebombing, during which six Sun Hill officers died – Worrell, Spears, Harker, Monroe, Riley and Hayward – as well as the events leading up to the attack, which saw the death of Chief Inspector Conway. (Special presentation, with a full reprise of the episodes "Spill", "Instant Response", "Urgent Assistance", "Dancers", "Stuffed", "Deep Secret", "Badlands", "Trojan Horse" and "Golden Opportunity (008)".) This presentation was broadcast on UKTV Gold.
57	"Happily Ever After"	Guest appearance of Marie Graham; Lucy Cohu and Peter de Jersey guest star	Julie Edwards	Kate Wood	18 August 2004	237
As Ackland and Carver prepare to tie the knot, the past threatens to catch up with both of them and shatter their happiness. Kent plays mind games with Ackland, suggesting the marriage is merely a sham, and tries to dissuade her from proceeding with the ceremony. The situation turns from bad to worse when Carver's ex-wife Marie turns up uninvited and drunk, causing a scene in front of the congregation. Meanwhile, Young wakes up in bed at the Radfords' house and begins to get caught up in their criminal world, but Thatcher tries to persuade her to keep digging, until he find some concrete evidence to nail them. Later, he acts on his and Jerome Taylor's plan to ruin Okaro's reputation.
58	"In Too Deep"	Departure of SCP Jonathan Fox; Peter de Jersey guest stars	Susan Tully	Graham Mitchell	19 August 2004	238
Still working undercover, Young gets in way over her head after witnessing the death of an escort at the Radford run club Hedley's, becoming unknowingly caught up in the disposal of the body, and she is later ordered to beat one of the others by family matriarch Irene. Thatcher begins to fear the worst when she goes for days without reporting back, and when the escort's body is found in a burnt-out vehicle, the ID of Young's persona being found nearby causes him to panic. As Manson's relationship with Dunbar blossoms, he lets slip some of his most closely guarded secrets about his colleagues – not least Okaro's arrest, and his cannabis possession story soon ends up on the front pages of the newspapers. After discovering Gold gave away the wedding reception to Ackland and Carver, Fox requests a transfer to another station, leaving Gold devastated.
59	"Only Fools and Coppers"	Peter de Jersey guest stars	Susan Tully	John Milne	26 August 2004	239
Smithy realises that Young has embarked on an unauthorised undercover mission to investigate the Radford family and tracks her down, begging her to pull out before it's too late – but she turns a deaf ear to his pleas, telling him she needs to rescue a group of illegal immigrants working as escorts from the club. As Smithy organises a raid to rescue her, Thatcher struggles to convince Ackland to go ahead, having failed to get authorisation from a senior officer. After an interview with the DPS, Okaro refuses to accept a caution for possession of cannabis, determined to stand trial and clear his name. Meanwhile, Hollis and Chambers get better acquainted in the station's pantry.
60	"Luck of the Draw"	–	Nic Phillips	Oliver Brown	1 September 2004	240
With Young's cover blown and Irene Radford demanding Smithy is executed, David Radford tasks two associates with shooting the pair. Young and Smithy find themselves minutes away from certain death, but the raid on Hedley's Club takes place just in time to save them. While the raid is a bust, Wayne Radford is found in possession of ecstasy, but Thatcher's joy at nailing one of the three Radfords is quickly snuffed when he is hauled over the coals by Okaro. Wayne proceeds to blow Young's cover to Gold in interview, leaving Smith, Young, Drummond and Thatcher scrambling to cover themselves. Just as it seems they have their bases covered, Irene and David Radford are called in by Gold for questioning. Perkins finds himself under fire from De Costa for falling behind on his checks of the sex offenders register, with one of his overlooked offenders abducting a neighbour's young son. Meanwhile, Nixon decides to file a mis-per report after her daughter Abi fails to return home.
61	"Desperation"	Lenora Crichlow guest stars	Nic Phillips	Ray Brooking	2 September 2004	241
Gold leads the enquiry into the disappearance of Nixon's daughter Abigail, but Nixon manages to force her way onto the case. They are concerned she may have been abducted when messages on an X-Rated website Abigail was using leads to an arrangement to meet one of her "admirers". Harman and Hunter are first on scene as a teenager causes criminal damage then has a seizure, discovering he has overdosed on dangerous DIY ecstasy tablets, so McAllister and Best hunt the producers and dealers. DeCosta catches Perkins browsing explicit images on a paedophile's website, and after opening up to his sergeant, Perkins goes to meet his brother, Ben. McVerry is furious when Shirley Moss steals his disabled parking badge, but when Hemmingway confronts her, Shirley admits she has been diagnosed as HIV-positive.
62	"Suicidal Thoughts"	Lenora Crichlow, Sarah Hadland, Jo Martin, Nick Wilton, Trevor Byfield and Peter de Jersey guest star	Adrian Vitoria	Scott Cherry	8 September 2004	242
DeCosta tells Perkins he has to seek counselling over his abuse, but he instead goes to track down the man who abused him and his brother as children. Hemmingway tries to stop Shirley Moss from selling her baby, but after stopping the illegal adoption, she finds herself delivering the teen's premature baby. McAllister discovers her son's nanny has been working as a prostitute from her flat, but soon discovers she is being forced into it by her abusive husband, who is running a series of prostitutes posing as nannies. Nixon is convinced that missing daughter Abigail has been taken against her will, but as Hunter convinces her to go public, Nixon ends up breaking down.
63	"Transcendence"	Sam Callis, Trevor Byfield and Peter de Jersey guest star	Adrian Vitoria	Tom Needham	9 September 2004	243
DeCosta fears when she discovers Malcolm Willard has been reported missing, and with Perkins nowhere to be seen, she is forced to tell Okaro the history between Willard and Perkins. As Perkins talks to brother Ben about his encounter with Willard, Hollis and Hunter find him at his home. However, they are later called back to his home when Ben tries drowning his abuser, telling Hollis and Hunter about Willard's abuse of Perkins. Willard refuses to press charges for the attack, and with Ben's evidence inconclusive, it looks like Willard will get away with it. Gold and McAllister investigate when Wayne Radford is found dead in his cell at Longmarsh, but despite suggestions of it being an overdose, Wayne's body is covered in bruises and cigarette burns. When Gold goes to see Wayne's grieving mother Irene, she demands to see his body, witnessing the injuries sustained in prison. With Thatcher implicated in a rumour circulating throughout the prison about Wayne being a child killer, they are left to deal with retribution attacks including the stabbing of Wayne's cellmate. Meanwhile, Dunbar infuriates former lover Manson when she illegally obtains Jerome Taylor's DNA in an attempt to prove he was responsible for planting drugs on Okaro.
64	"An Eye for an Eye"	First appearance of DI Rowanne Morell; Lenora Crichlow, Lucy Cohu and Peter de Jersey guest star	David Holroyd	Dawn Harrison	15 September 2004	244
MIT's DI Morrell swoops in to investigate when Malcolm Willard is killed in a sniper attack. Perkins and his brother Ben are implicated, but Perkins is quickly alibied, later pairing with DeCosta to track Ben down. Realising he is on the run with a rifle, Perkins determines to find his brother before SO19 do. Okaro's trial for drugs possession begins, and Manson ends his fury about Dunbar's illegal acquisition of Jerome Taylor's DNA by pairing with his former lover to prove Okaro's innocence, while Manson's wife Philippa does her best as Okaro's barrister to clear his name. When DNA proves Taylor touched the drugs, Dunbar reaches out to a journalist friend to get info on dealers Taylor may know, while Manson works out a plan to get a legal sample from Taylor. Meanwhile, Gold is left furious when Kent spreads word around the relief that Malcolm Willard was a paedophile, and it's not long before the news reaches the press via a tipoff from Dunbar.
65	"Acting with Caution"	—	David Holroyd	Emma Goodwin	16 September 2004	245
Powell and Hunter attend to an armed carjacking, but they are left red in the face when SO19 arrest the suspect in a playground with nothing but a bag of food. As Powell and Hunter go in search of the firearm, Hunter's amnesty against guns leads him to make a foolish decision. Okaro briefs the relief on the possibility of a serial sniper on the patch, following the death of Malcolm Willard, then later confronts Thatcher over Jerome Taylor's accusations that Thatcher was his man inside Sun Hill. Dunbar and Manson clash after he refuses to give her credit for clearing Okaro's name, and Manson is determined to resume their affair. Meanwhile, Nixon desperately continues her search for daughter Abigail and fears the worst when she sees an apparent suicide note on an email.
66	"The Pocket Cop"	First appearance of DC Suzie Sim	Martin Hutchings	Kathrine Smith	22 September 2004	246
A former colleague and close friend of Manson, DC Suzie Sim, arrives for her first day at Sun Hill. She pairs with Best to investigate a spate of incidents at a local hostel housing refugees, but Best soon resents Sim for acting as his superior. Their investigation, leads to the arrest of Perkins', nephew Bradley, who ends up facing charges of criminal damage and sexual assault on an Asian immigrant. Young is left frustrated after being paired with Harman, who spends most of the shift talking about her newfound relationship with Hunter. As Young is ambushed by the gang targeting the hostel, she blasts Harman in front of their colleagues, and her continued disinterest in the job drives her back to David Radford. Meanwhile, Nixon enlists the help of former lover and trained profiler Hugh Wallis as she continues to look for missing daughter Abigail.
67	"Some Brighter Days"	Sam Callis and David Sterne guest star	Martin Hutchings	Sue Mooney	23 September 2004	247
Sim tells DeCosta that she believes Perkins' nephew Bradley is being abused, leading Perkins to the horrifying conclusion that his brother Ben may be responsible. There is more trouble with the Radfords; however, this time it is estranged son Karl being targeted, with a campaign of escalating criminal damage at his church. Hollis and Stamp try to convince Karl to give the boys responsible up, but determined to protect his congregation, it's left to Gold to change his mind when an arson attack hospitalises the priest. Harman is infuriated when an assault at a dog track reunites her with her cheating ex-fiancée Fletch, unaware he is now close friends with Carver, whose gambling addiction is starting to spiral out of control. Hunter is initially jealous, but his mood changes as Harman determines to prove Fletch is implicated in a scam running at the dogs. Meanwhile, Meadows tells McAllister he is heading away for the week to attend the funeral of an old friend.
68	"Last Orders"	Final guest appearance of Bob Cryer, guest appearance of Alec Peters	Audrey Cooke	Peter J. Hammond	30 September 2004	248
While on compassionate leave, Meadows heads into the countryside after the death of former Sun Hill DS Ted Roach, attending his funeral with former Sun Hill Sergeants Bob Cryer and Alec Peters. Curious as to why a character such as Roach would settle for a quiet village off the grid, they poke around the area, but soon discover his death is suspicious. Their investigation leads them to a local police Sergeant and a possible affair with the man's wife, as well as a peculiar private investigation Roach was conducting; however, they soon realise it's not connected to either case, but to a secret Roach was harbouring before he died. Meanwhile, back in London, Perkins continues a private investigation of his own as he determines to prove his brother Ben has been abusing his sons, but he risks blowing the case when he arrests Ben on a dodgy charge, much to the dismay of DeCosta. In the end, Meadows suffers a heart attack.
69	"Ulterior Motive"	—	Audrey Cooke	Simon McCleave	6 October 2004	249
Nixon's fears for daughter Abigail when she receives an apparent suicide video message. Nixon calls Wallis in to assist once more, but he clashes with Hunter, who is concerned he is being too brutal about Abigail's motives. McAllister pairs with Sim to investigate a stabbing outside a prostitute's flat, but McAllister soon takes her mind of the job when Manson tells CID that Meadows is in hospital after his heart attack. Having been transferred to a London hospital, McAllister goes to visit her closest friend, determined to support him as he recovers. Thatcher believes he has the evidence to bring down the Radfords, but yet another raid on their club fails where Smith finds Young with David Radford.
70	"Heartless"	Liz May Brice guest stars	Sven Arnstein	Christopher Reason	7 October 2004	250
The relief are sickened when an 11-year-old blind girl is savagely assaulted, tied up and gagged. A link to the mother’s past reveals she was a drug addict, and her old boyfriend Christopher Spinks, is named suspect number one after being spotted in the house. When they find his clothes burnt after fleeing in a stolen van, Sim blasts Dunbar when a piece of crucial evidence is destroyed. Things take a dramatic turn when a smug Spinks is gunned down after walking free at court. When Okaro confirms there is a serial sniper on the patch, he is left horrified that one of his team is feeding info to the killer, or worse, is the sniper. Gold reprimands Young after finding out about her affair with David Radford, meanwhile Young is given an interesting opportunity by the Radford family and considers double crossing the police.
71	"What Goes Around..."	Liz May Brice guest stars	Sven Arnstein	Andrew Taft	13 October 2004	251
Sim and Dunbar pair to investigate the real suspect in the attack on a blind girl the day before, with the death of Christopher Spinks looking like alternative justice for the wrong culprit. As MIT continue their investigation into the serial sniper, Young voices her suspicions about Kent being involved to Dunbar while also telling Gold that she has turned her back on the Radfords once and for all. However, Young becomes increasingly disillusioned with her job and comes to blows with a member of the public. Smithy and Sim clash when Sim repeatedly questions Dunbar's capabilities. Nixon is left fearing she has an enemy who has abducted her daughter Abigail when a body matching Abigail's description is found on the banks of the River Thames, mere metres from where her clothes were found. Dunbar and Manson argue when it is suggested that Manson and Sim used to be romantically involved but they soon make up. Elsewhere, Young is left contemplating revenge when she spies David cheating on her with one of the girls at the club but she soon agrees to join David and Irene as they plan a robbery on a shipment of drugs.
72	"Going Native"	Daniel Coonan guest stars	Christopher King	Mark Greig	14 October 2004	252
Young's attempts to increase her reputation are boosted when she double crosses David Radford by arresting him conducting an armed robbery. During celebratory drinks, she catches Manson and Dunbar in a passionate clinch. When she goes to confront Dunbar, she finds evidence that names Dunbar as a journalist leading to a confrontation where Young reveals to Dunbar that Kent manipulated her into accusing Smithy of raping her and then raped her himself. Things get even better when Ackland lets slip that Kent is working under a false ID. Thrilled that she has finally got the fuel to regain the respect she lost at Sun Hill in recent months, she is stopped in her tracks as the Radfords show they have one final trick up their sleeves. In the wake of Radford's arrest, Thatcher is barred from any interviews, so he focus on trying to get the men he tried to rob to testify against the Radfords. Meanwhile, Okaro briefs the team on the possibility that Sun Hill has a serial sniper in its midst.
73	"Friendly Fire (Part One)"	Rick Warden guest stars	Christopher King	Matthew Leys	20 October 2004	253
While investigating a series of street robberies involving a knife, Kent furiously confronts Ackland after discovering Young has cracked his false identity. He goes round to Young's in order to confront her, but with Young nowhere to be seen, he breaks in. Disrupted by a call from a neighbour, Kent is forced to call in his own crime, and Smith fears Young has been abducted by David Radford when Kent reports her missing. With Dunbar also keen to track Young down, she cons a guarding Stamp into getting access to Young's flat in order to find the evidence Young has on her. Hollis eventually tracks Young down to St. Hugh's, where her father has had a stroke, and she decides to sit on the dirt she has on Kent and Dunbar while she waits to hear if her father will pull through. When Smith goes to meet her, he finally admits exactly how he feels about her. She decides to act on her info when her dad gets all the clear, but Kent resorts to deadly action when he discovers Young is heading for Sun Hill. Meanwhile, Thatcher takes his mind off the Radford investigation by assisting McAllister on hunting down a flyposter with a sideline in drug dealing.
74	"Friendly Fire (Part Two)"	Final appearance of PC Kerry Young	Nigel Keen	Cris Cole	21 October 2004	254
Young is left fighting for her life after being gunned down by Kent. As he rushes to clear the building across from Sun Hill before SO19, he leaves behind crucial evidence. Okaro demands the ambulance stands by until SO19 clear the area, causing a delay in Young's transport to hospital. When she does eventually make it there, she ends up going into cardiac arrest and dies, leaving Smithy heartbroken. He returns to Sun Hill and confronts Okaro, furious at his decision to delay the ambulance, and after being dismissed by Okaro, he immediately pursues David Radford. When Irene Radford makes a complaint to Gold, Smithy tells his best friend he's had enough and hands in his warrant card, leaving Gold determined to talk him round. Kent breathes a sigh of relief when he hears Young has died, and despite his guilt, is taken aback when Ackland questions his involvement. As he retrieves the evidence he left behind, he feels like he has all his bases covered, until DI Morrell of MIT drops a bombshell on him.
75	"The Starting Grid"	Lenora Crichlow and Barbara Wilshere guest star	Nigel Keen	Henrietta Hardy	27 October 2004	255
Kent falsely tells Morrell that he and Young had been having an affair after discovering she was pregnant with his child when she was killed. As Kent reels from the discovery he has killed his unborn son, Okaro orders him to go on leave. Smithy is furious as Drummond and Sim imply Young may have been the press leak, when CCTV of her with Dunbar's editor the day before her death surfaces. Events only get worse when Young's investigations are linked to sniper victims Sandford, Willard and Spinks, leaving Morrell suspecting Young may have been feeding info to the sniper. Hemmingway has to intervene yet again when Shirley Moss smashes up her foster home when they refuse her access to her baby, with her constant calls to see Shirley distracting her from an investigation into a driver who fled the scene of Young's shooting. When Powell covers for her, Hemmingway breaks down over Young's death. Meanwhile, Nixon goes to visit the mother of the girl who was found on the bank of the Thames, after the grim discovery that the girl's body was stolen from the mortuary to be dumped by the river.
76	"Long Overdue"	Geoffrey Beevers guest stars	Richard Standeven	Nick Saltrese	28 October 2004	256
Meadows returns to work after his heart attack. McAllister pairs with him to investigate suspected drug smuggler Wesley Patterson; however, she is suspicious that her boss is rushing back before he's ready. Carver receives a missing person's report, and when the man is admitted to hospital with a suspected overdose, the investigation quickly links to Patterson. Hemmingway's sister Beverly is admitted to hospital after being attacked, but while she suspects Beverly's husband is responsible, Beverly isn't willing to name him. Despite asking DeCosta to investigate, Hemmingway goes off and arrests Beverly's husband anyway. Meanwhile, Hunter is approached by a young boy claiming there is a sex offender taking photos in his local park; however, the boy's track record and ASBO leaves him sceptical.
77	"Old Timer"	First appearance of PC Roger Valentine; Lenora Crichlow and Sara Griffiths guest star	Richard Standeven	Nicholas McInerny	3 November 2004	257
Carver decides to partner with Fletch in order to clear his debts, taking up part-ownership of a greyhound used for bet rigging, and Carver's first hit lands him over £11,000. However, he pushes his luck too far and loses it all on another dog, and things only get worse when Meadows gets on his back about finding out what Fletch is up to. New Area Car driver Roger Valentine arrives after being out of the Met for five years, and he pairs with Powell to investigate a series of street robberies. Nixon gets a lead with the investigation into Abigail's disappearance when her daughter is seen on CCTV smashing up a shop. When she and Wallis spot a clue, their investigation leads them to a local cemetery; what is the connection to Abigail? Meanwhile, Hemmingway is dismayed when Shirley Moss is arrested yet again.
78	"Playing with Fire"	Geoffrey Hutchings guest stars	Philip John	Tom Needham	4 November 2004	258
The relief prepare for Young's funeral, with the day hard in particular for Smithy and Hemmingway, while Kent's grovelling eulogy raises a number of eyebrows, with his rape of Young that resulted in her and subsequent pregnancy still a secret to the relief. Harman convinces Fletch to let Carver get evidence of his involvement in a rigged dog ring back, but when Fletch demands an extra £10,000, he gets £40,000 from a loan shark to cut his ties with Fletch. McAllister is thrilled as she gets closer to nailing Fletch and his boss Wesley Patterson, but she gets knocked when her son Andrew suffers an injury during an accident at home.
78a	"Kerry's Story: Uncovered"	The Bill: Uncovered documentary	Henry Klejdys	Julie Hill	4 November 2004	258A
Confined to a courtroom, Gabriel reveals all behind Kerry's time at Sun Hill. From the relationships to the high life, from the career choices to the bad decisions. No stone is left unturned. No barrier is left closed. Who was Kerry Young? Let Gabriel tell all.
79	"Where Loyalties Lie"	Final appearance of DS Debbie McAllister	Philip John	Steve Griffiths	10 November 2004	259
McAllister prepares to finalise her operation with Meadows to arrest suspected drug smuggler Wesley Patterson and his right-hand man, Harman's ex-fiancé Stephen "Fletch" Fletcher. After arresting a drugs mule, they think everything is in place to ensnare Patterson and Fletch, but McAllister is quickly called to the hospital when she discovers her son Andrew is seriously ill after his accident the day before, causing her to seriously consider her future in the job. Gold and Smithy tell the relief that Young was indeed pregnant with Kent's unborn child when she died, ending rumours after his outburst at Young's wake. As Kent pairs with Ackland on the case of a teenage girl who has smashed up a shop, the revelation that the girl is pregnant and planning a termination sends Kent off the rails. Meanwhile, Dunbar drops a bombshell on Smithy.
80	"Not the Real Thing"	Lenora Crichlow guest stars	Nic Phillips	Simon Moss	11 November 2004	260
Smithy is determined to prove that Kent raped Young, after Dunbar's claims that Young confided in her before she was killed. The trio investigate major criminal Jimmy Cross when a van registered in his name leaves the scene of a hit and run, leaving behind dozens of smashed bottles of high end vodka. When they track down Jimmy's depot, they discover the bottles are mislabelled, and a rumour later emerges that Jimmy had been bragging about selling the dodgy vodka to the late Wayne Radford. Smithy meets Young's father George, although Kent gets there first to interrupt their meeting. Stamp and Hollis arrest a man selling stolen property in a pub, and when he is linked to a series of burglaries investigated by Best and Sim, he offers information on a man with a severed arm in his home. Best and Sim are made to look foolish when it proves to be a fake, but is there more to the case than meets the eye? Meanwhile, Hemmingway is reprimanded by Gold when her sister Beverly drops off niece Lily at the station without warning. Smithy overhears Kent exaggerating to his colleagues about his conversation with Kerry's dad and realises that Kent has manipulated the whole station.
81	"Long Buried Secrets"	Sam Callis and Anthony Jackson guest star	Nic Phillips	Harold Jordan	17 November 2004	261
A full-scale feud between the Cross and Radford families reaches peak point when Wayne Radford's grave is vandalised. As evidence against Jimmy Cross is found, he is gunned down in a drive-by shooting before an arrest can be made. As forensics link to the shooting of Thatcher's father in 1983, Gold and Okaro go over video footage of the incident, coming to a startling realisation. Dunbar reluctantly talks to Morrell after Smith reports Young's rape allegation against Kent. Dunbar pairs with Stamp on a burglary case where a man is accusing his daughter of robbing him and his younger girlfriend. When the man is hospitalised, Stamp discovers the girlfriend may be manipulating him for his money.
82	"Mexican Stand-Off"	Sam Callis, Lois Baxter and David Simeon guest star	Laurence Moody	Harold Jordan	18 November 2004	262
Okaro and Gold are stunned to discover Irene Radford was responsible for killing Thatcher's father in 1983. As a friend in MIT tells Thatcher that a new suspect has emerged, he confronts Karl Radford. When Karl reveals it has been Irene all along, Thatcher goes after David and beats him to within an inch of his life to get his phone. Luring Irene to a childhood haunt, a Mexican stand-off soon occurs when Thatcher takes a gun off Irene and David shows up to rescue her. As the net closes in, Thatcher gets desperate to get his own form of justice. Nixon's digging into the disappearance of her daughter Abigail takes a grim twist when a clue leads to a webcam of her captivity. Meanwhile, Valentine and Hunter investigate when a couple have their home vandalised, but while Valentine suspects a scorned lover, he soon discovers he needs to look closer to home.
83	"Closer to Home"	Hywel Bennett guest stars	Laurence Moody	Graham Mitchell	24 November 2004	263
Nixon is horrified when she receives a webcam link of her daughter Abigail locked in a shipping container with a countdown timer stating how much air she has left. As she and her colleagues frantically search for her location. Nixon believes she has finally found her suspect; Peter Baxter, a convicted rapist and murderer she stopped going back to jail when he falsely confessed to being a serial killer a few years earlier. As Baxter is arrested, Hunter tries to get him to give up Abigail's location, until Nixon comes to the horrifying realisation that someone close to her is responsible.
84	"Beginner's Luck"	First appearances of PC Amber Johannsen and Margaret Barnes; Hywel Bennett guest stars	Rob Evans	Harold Jordan	1 December 2004	264
Nixon is relieved as Abigail recovers in hospital after her kidnapping ordeal, but she is frustrated by Abigail's reluctance to talk. Under interview with Sim, Abigail talks about how much she resents her mother, and after being taunted by Wallis, Nixon gets the ultimate blow from her daughter. New PC Amber Johannsen arrives late for her first shift, and things get worse for the probationer when she forgets how to properly issue a caution. She gets a second chance when she is sent undercover with Carver to catch a woman who is conning men into calling premium rate phone numbers from their own mobiles. Meanwhile, DeCosta deals with a mother who claims her husband is attacking her, but her story fails to add up.
85	"Closing the Book"	—	Rob Evans	Stuart Blackburn	8 December 2004	265
Ackland pairs with new recruit Johannsen as they target a family terrorising a local housing estate. She eagerly prepares for her retirement party, but she is floored when a guilt-ridden Carver decides to come clean about his debts. DeCosta searches for manic depressive Margaret Barnes; having been admitted to hospital for self-harm the night before, she goes to her family's home and smashes a window. As DeCosta and Drummond investigate, they are surprised to learn Barnes has handed herself in. DeCosta is keen to help Barnes, but she is left conflicted when her husband Chris asks her to be a character witness as he seeks an injunction to keep her away from their children.
86	"Salvation"	Departure of Sgt June Ackland; Lenora Crichlow guest stars	Brett Fallis	Mark Johnson	9 December 2004	266
Carver tells Ackland all about his debts, and she is willing to give him another chance; however, he fails to show up for an end of shift meeting after being abducted by loan shark Zaccadelli. Ackland's final day at Sun Hill sees her pair with Stamp when a Tom Jones impersonator is accused of torching a rival musician's car. Hemmingway and Smith stop a young tearaway trying to set fire to a local community centre, but Hemmingway's personal life gets in the way once more when her sister Beverly is assaulted in their home, and a drug dealer linked to Shirley Moss is named as prime suspect. Perkins takes over the case of the tearaway's arson attempt when he accuses the community centre's leader of sexual assault.
87	"A Different Kind of Justice"	Lenora Crichlow, Sean Gilder and James Ellis guest star	Brett Fallis	Scott Cherry	14 December 2004	267
Hemmingway attends the latest in a long line of calls to her own home when sister Beverly reports that her daughter Lily has been found unconscious. Shirley Moss is soon implicated when a doctor confirms Lily has overdosed on ecstasy and Hemmingway proceeds to throw her out, then sets her sights on Shirley's dealer Nick Tennyson. Carver confides in Drummond after his split from Ackland as they investigate Lily's overdose. Dunbar and Kent attend to a call about criminal damage, and Kent manages to find out from Dunbar that Smithy reported Young's alleged rape to MIT. Kent believes the suspect for the criminal damage, John Kirkby, is being framed by his ex-girlfriend in an attempt to stop him getting custody of their son. When Kirkby flips, he abducts his son before holding Kent at gunpoint.
88	"The Perfect Alibi"	First appearance of PC Leela Kapoor; Sean Gilder guest stars	Peter Butler	Harold Jordan	15 December 2004	268
Smithy sets off in pursuit as Kent and hostage taker John Kirkby are gunned down by the sniper. Kent regains consciousness and reveals he hasn't been shot, but Kirkby is admitted to hospital with spinal injuries. Kent self-discharges from hospital and confronts his partner in crime, furious that he has shot someone without his say so. PC Leela Kapoor arrives for her first day at Sun Hill, pairing with Murphy, but they soon clash when it is revealed Kapoor gave evidence against a former colleague and friend of Murphy's who was suspended for assaulting a witness. Meanwhile, Carver pairs with Drummond and they quickly solve a burglary, but Carver's escalating debts lead him to take desperate action.
89	"Anything for a Dime"	—	Peter Butler	John Milne	16 December 2004	269
Kent reels as Drummond and Sim identify the sniper on CCTV. After receiving a video from his associate, Kent breaks into his house and wipes his computer hard drive. As the net closes in on the sniper, Smithy locates the gun, so SO19 coordinate a raid. As Kent forces his way onto the raid, he takes a major gamble to silence his partner in crime before he can be arrested. Carver is relieved when Ackland pays off his outstanding debts, but he has another problem to contend with after stealing a burglary victim's watch before gambling away the money he received for it. As he struggles to retrieve the watch, Drummond gives him a harsh reality check. Meanwhile, Okaro has a heated meeting with Dunbar's editor.
90	"An Unwanted Death"	PC Yvonne Hemmingway is promoted to A/Sgt; Lenora Crichlow guest stars	Alan MacMillan	Maxwell Young	21 December 2004	270
Morrell arrives on the Cole Lane Estate to investigate the sniper's death. Kent is desperate to cover his tracks, pressuring Hunter into claiming Kent "dropped" the sniper over the balcony, and Smithy is immediately suspicious of his nemesis for being caught up in another high-profile incident. Hemmingway's first day as Acting Sergeant gets off to a bad start when Shirley Moss is hospitalised after being found in a car that has crashed following a pursuit with the Area Car. As Hemmingway discovers she has been living with a dealer, she blows an OBBO run by Drummond and Sim when her sister Beverly is implicated. Meanwhile, Rollins is furious with Powell when his sexuality is revealed to SO19, while Manson disappoints Dunbar by refusing to spend time with her at the station's Christmas party.
91	"One Rule for One"	Lenora Crichlow guest stars	Alan MacMillan	Harold Jordan	22 December 2004	271
Hemmingway has the day from hell when she reconciles with Shirley Moss, only for the young girl to die from the injuries she sustained in a car crash the day before. As her sister Beverly begs to be released from custody, an insensitive comment about Shirley by Beverly leads to a screaming match in front of a furious Gold. Dunbar and Powell attend to a fight in a lap-dancing bar, with Dunbar talk of the nick after her snog with Smithy at the Christmas party. As another incident occurs at the bar, Dunbar finds herself hospitalised in a vicious attack by the suspect. Powell reels after Rollins' proposal the night before, seeking advice from Murphy. Meanwhile, Gold is stunned when she believes she has sighted Irene Radford.
92	"Bust"	Final appearance of David Radford; Sam Callis and Daisy Beaumont guest star	Robert Bierman	Emma Goodwin	23 December 2004	272
Gold pairs with Hunter to investigate Irene Radford's return to Sun Hill, with Harman and Johannsen attending the Radford home to find a dog drowned in the swimming pool. Hunter goes to David Radford's prison to watch a meeting with his mother, but his prior relationship with the Prison Liaison Officer leads to them being distracted, and a replay of the tape causes it to freeze, causing Hunter to lie about what was said. Nixon returns from leave and goes to see Jack Gaunt's wife with Gold when the long-term Radford associate is reported missing, while Hunter and Best investigate Irene allegedly preparing a robbery, but Gold is left furious when it appears they have missed a plot for Irene to break David out of a prison transporter.
93	"Return of the Gang Queen"	Final appearances of DC Rob Thatcher and Irene Radford; Sam Callis, Daisy Beaumont, Pip Torrens and Ruth Sheen guest star	Robert Bierman	Christopher Reason	29 December 2004	273
Irene Radford abducts Gold after failing to break son David out of a prison transporter. As they drive to a remote cottage, the two women find they have more in common than they first realised. The Kidnap Squad arrive in an attempt to locate Radford and Gold, but a relay from Gold's radio leads to them hearing an associate of Radford's shooting Jack Gaunt dead. As Gold is tracked down, Radford drives off with Gold at gunpoint. Driving to an airfield, Gold is tracked down by SO19 and the Kidnap Squad, but a potential surrender is interrupted by the appearance of Thatcher. Meanwhile, the Hunter brothers are blasted by their female best friends for their recent indiscretions.
94	"The Cold Winter Blues"	Colm Ó Maonlaí, Ruth Sheen and Elliott Jordan guest star	Jo Johnson	Martin McCardie	30 December 2004	274
The relief reel following Thatcher's fatal shooting of Irene Radford and subsequent death at the hands of SO19 the night before. Drummond and Hunter find it especially hard after failing to talk Thatcher down during the standoff, while Hunter feels his negligence prior to Radford's failed prison break may have impacted the outcome. Perkins is tasked with assisting DeCosta when a woman accuses her son of being a paedophile, but dealing with the case only heightens Perkins' determination to track down his brother Ben. Powell and Murphy attend a disturbance at a pub, linking it to the theft of a signed photograph of the 1966 England team from a local electronics shop. Meanwhile, Powell prepares for his stag do.
