= Cameron Tait =

- The Bill character
- First appearance: "Thinking Out Loud"; 30 January 2003
- Last appearance: "The Rapture"; 22 July 2004
- Portrayed by: Daniel MacPherson

In-universe information
- Title: Police Constable
- Occupation: Police officer
- Significant other: Kerry Young
- Children: Emily Tait

Cameron Tait is a fictional character from the British police procedural television series The Bill, played by Daniel MacPherson. He first appeared in the eighteenth series episode "Thinking Out Loud", broadcast on 30 January 2003. Cameron was introduced as a police constable from Sydney, Australia, who joins the Metropolitan Police based at the Sun Hill station in London. MacPherson was approached by the show's producers about the role, after they saw him in a production of Godspell. He was hesitant about accepting as he did not intend to stay in the UK for long, and he was not sure the role was right for him. However, he was convinced by the changes brought in by Paul Marquess and the strong ratings the show was achieving in the UK and Australia. MacPherson was contracted for 18 months and he began filming in September 2002. With Cameron being the first Australian police officer to appear in The Bill, MacPherson worked with the scriptwriters to make him more a realistic Australian and said that he had to remove some stereotypical Australian words from his dialogue. To help him prepare for the role, MacPherson went on a ride-along with the Bondi police, and he also shaved his head.

Cameron is portrayed as loyal, happy-go-lucky, and good at his job. A reporter for The Sydney Morning Herald thought that the character's personality closely resembled that of MacPherson's. The actor said Cameron can come across as a loner, and he is only willing to give up his personality as much as he needs to, which to some of his colleagues can come across as rudeness. He was also called a dark horse and said to be hiding a lot of secrets. MacPherson believed Cameron was somewhat resentful about having to leave Australia, and the reasons for his transfer would become apparent as he settled into life at Sun Hill. MacPherson was glad of the chance to play a complex character. In his first scenes, Cameron is mistaken for a flasher and almost arrested by PC Kerry Young (Beth Cordingly). This required MacPherson to film in the nude, which he found to be a bit daunting. Cameron's secret and his reason for relocating to London was revealed in August 2003, as he reunites with his young daughter, Emily (Lily Devereux). MacPherson believed that Cameron kept Emily's existence from his colleagues as he had no intention of staying in the UK and he was worried they would judge him. He later puts his job at risk when he attempts to take Emily back to Australia.

One of the character's more notable storylines sees him burdened by guilt over the death of Sergeant Sheelagh Murphy's (Bernie Nolan) daughter, who he was babysitting. MacPherson said the incident destroys Cameron and he struggles to deal with it. The storyline allowed MacPherson to explore his character's emotional depths over a number of weeks. The plot also led to Cameron and Kerry establishing a romance, which faces several challenges, including Kerry's one-night stand with Sergeant Dale "Smithy" Smith (Alex Walkinshaw), who is later accused of date-raping her, their engagement, Kerry's rape by PC Gabriel Kent (Todd Carty), who manipulates the couple for his own benefit. In February 2004, MacPherson announced that he was leaving The Bill as he missed Australia and wanted to pursue film roles. His final appearance was broadcast on 22 July 2004, as Cameron leaves Sun Hill after a fight with Gabriel. For his performance, MacPherson received a nomination for Most Popular Newcomer at the 9th National Television Awards. One television critic believed that MacPherson had been introduced as "eye candy" for the viewers, but a reporter for The Sydney Morning Herald observed that he had become an audience favourite.

== Casting ==
MacPherson was appearing in a production of the stage musical Godspell at the New Wimbledon Theatre when he was spotted by The Bill's producers, including Paul Marquess, when they came to see the show. He was offered the role of Cameron the following day. MacPherson, who had no intentions of staying in the UK for long or appearing on television, felt flattered by the offer. He admitted that he and his family were not fans of the show, but he had seen some scenes and conjured an image of "older guys in suits, and grey skies, and plods in uniform", which made him unsure about whether the role was right for him. However, MacPherson recognised that the show had changed a lot since Marquess had taken over and it was achieving strong ratings in both the UK and Australia, so he was convinced to accept the role. He stated "It was the Aussie traveller in me that wanted to base myself here and get to see a bit of Europe. But it was also the opportunity to play a cool character in a well-established drama that rates nine million in this country and very highly in Australia. Doing this and the musical was a wonderful way to break out of the ex-soap actor mould." MacPherson was initially contracted for 18 months, and he began filming in September 2002. He was unsure about how he would be received by his new co-stars, particularly the older ones, due to his age and soap opera background, but he found them to be welcoming. He made his first appearance on 30 January 2003.

Cameron was the first Australian police officer to appear in The Bill. MacPherson said he had to work with the show's scriptwriters to help them develop his character into "a more realistic" Australian. He explained: "Over the first six months or so I think both The Bill writers and myself struggled to put the character exactly where we wanted him. For the first three months I was crossing out 'mate' and 'strewth' at the end of sentences." To help him prepare for the role, MacPherson joined a Bondi police unit for the day and went on a ride-along. He spoke with the officers about what his character's life would be like working in Sydney, which helped him to imagine the culture shock Cameron would get upon his arrival at Sun Hill and his new beat in the East End of London. MacPherson felt that he "looked like a stripper" when he put on his character's uniform for the first time. He also chose to shave his head for the role. This caused the Daily Mirror's Sue Carroll to remark that he was "unrecognisable" from his time in the Australian soap opera Neighbours. MacPherson told her that his shaven head and the act of putting on the police uniform made him feel "physically ready for action." He also told her that real police officers would shadow the cast and crew while they filmed on the streets, and he did not envy their jobs at all. He teased his Cameron's story arc, saying "It's gritty stuff, and my character who starts as a happy-go-lucky Aussie develops a dark side. Before long, you wonder what ulterior motive he may have for being here. What's forced him to come to London?"

== Development ==
=== Characterisation and introduction ===
Cameron loved being a cop in Australia and initially finds it difficult adjusting to a new life in Old Blighty. He never saw himself ending up in England. Unlike most Aussies he never had wanderlust and thought that he would live and end his days in Sydney (God's own). If he never wanted to come to England then why is he here? Half a world away from friends and family the reasons for Cameron splitting slowly become apparent...

— An excerpt from the character's biography on the official website.

Cameron's profile on the show's official website describes him as "honourable, noble, loyal and good-humoured." A reporter for The Sydney Morning Herald observed that Cameron closely resembled MacPherson's own personality, saying he "couldn't seem sunnier or more relaxed". They described Cameron as "cheerful, good at his job, and loyal to his friends. But, in the best soap and serial traditions, he is also a Dark Horse." MacPherson said Cameron was transferred from Sydney for reasons that would become apparent the more he settles in at a new station. He also said that Cameron loves his job, but he is hiding a lot of secrets. He comes across as a bit of a loner and his colleagues are not sure how to take him. He and PC Luke Ashton (Scott Neal) are initially "edgy" with each other, while PC Des Taviner (Paul Usher) likes to tease him. To most of his colleagues, he is "Mr Sunny" with his charm and hard work ethic, which sees him take on tasks others tend to turn down.

Cameron's "unlikeable qualities" start to show up as he settles in, including his "dislike for England" and "republican affiliations". MacPherson stated that Cameron is "a bit resentful" about having to leave Australia, but "some bits and pieces" forced his relocation to London. He thought that Cameron would "give up his personality as much as he needs to", which can come across as rudeness to his colleagues, but he is hiding a lot. He added "What you see at first is a very happy-go-lucky Aussie policeman, but slowly he evolves and that starts to unravel." MacPherson was glad of the chance to play a more complex character, which was in sharp contrast to his former role as Joel Samuels in Neighbours, who was known for being a "Nice Guy". When asked whether he had any similarities to his character, MacPherson commented "I think we look similar – and walk the same! We're both crap in relationships, and in bed. No I think I'm a lot more laid back, and he's so uptight."

The character's debut sees him mistaken for a flasher by one of his new neighbours. MacPherson explained that Cameron is half-undressed and unpacking in his "carefree Aussie way" when PC Kerry Young (Beth Cordingly) knocks on the door ready to take him to the station. MacPherson filmed the scenes while naked in front a 50-strong crew. The scenes marked his first day on set, which he described as "a little bit daunting!" MacPherson later commented that Cameron's introduction was his "most embarrassing moment". After being informed that he would be appearing in the nude, MacPherson began attending the gym to tone up, and his training later inspired him to run the London Marathon. MacPherson and Cordingly soon began dating in real life. MacPherson joked: "I did my first scenes with Beth, in which I was completely naked. She was blown away by what she saw and hasn't been able to keep her hands off me since." MacPherson later said that they "clicked" after talking over lunch during his first day on set, and that the relationship made him realise why actors dated other actors.

=== Storylines ===
==== Daughter ====
From his introduction, it was made clear that the character was hiding a secret. However, unlike typical dramatic "blasts from the past", Cameron's secret was far from "sinister" when it is revealed that he moved to the UK to be with his young daughter, Emily (Lily Devereux). MacPherson said that he really liked the story upon reading it. Explaining his character's backstory, he said that Cameron met Emily's mother, Kim Bradley (Emma Owen) when she was travelling around Australia. The pair had a casual relationship and Cameron only learned that he had a daughter a year later when Kim's mother wrote to him. He continued: "At first he didn't know what the hell to do, but it's kind of indicative of his morals that he's changed his life for her. He quit his shifts on Bondi Beach to move to a different country and walk the streets of the East End, all for his little girl." When asked why Cameron kept Emily's existence from his colleagues, MacPherson thought it was because he had no plans on staying in the UK. He believed that Cameron was hopeful of taking Emily back to Australia with him, but he was also "a little bit ashamed" of what happened and worried that his colleagues would judge him.

Cameron's personal life is drawn into his profession when he realises Emily is in danger from Kim's partner. He takes his daughter and disappears with the intention of returning home to Australia. MacPherson told an Inside Soap columnist that Kim's partner Mark Davies (Nathan Constance) is being investigated by the police, and when Cameron learns Emily is being left alone, he feels that Kim and Mark are not fit to be parents to his daughter. He said Cameron's actions are done "on the spur of the moment", and called it "a rash decision" because he has not thought it through. MacPherson also said "He puts his job and life on the line, but that is out of the love he has for his daughter and it is the greatest love of his life." MacPherson enjoyed the storyline and working with Lily Devereux, who plays Cameron's daughter. He told the Inside Soap writer that the two of them became very close during filming, which he thought would come across on-screen too. He added that the atmosphere on set was "amazing" when Devereux was there, as everyone was "more chilled".

==== Downward spiral ====
In early February 2004, Cameron is involved in a traumatic storyline involving the death of Sergeant Sheelagh Murphy's (Bernie Nolan) infant daughter, Niamh. Cameron is looking after Niamh when she suddenly becomes unresponsive and is rushed to hospital, where she dies. The doctors are initially unsure what happened and it is assumed Niamh died from cot death. Nolan said that Sheelagh "half blames" Cameron as he was babysitting when it all happened, but it is coming from a place of guilt because he was there while she was not. Cameron is also burdened by guilt and begins drinking to excess to escape his feelings. He picks a fight with someone outside a pub and is beaten up as a result. MacPherson pointed out that Cameron blames himself, saying "Cameron's a good moral fella who takes things pretty hard and this just destroys him. He doesn't know how to deal with it. He's away from his family, his friends and everyone who would support him so he goes on a bender. Cameron's basically pretty straight so for him to go out and get in a pub brawl is quite a departure."

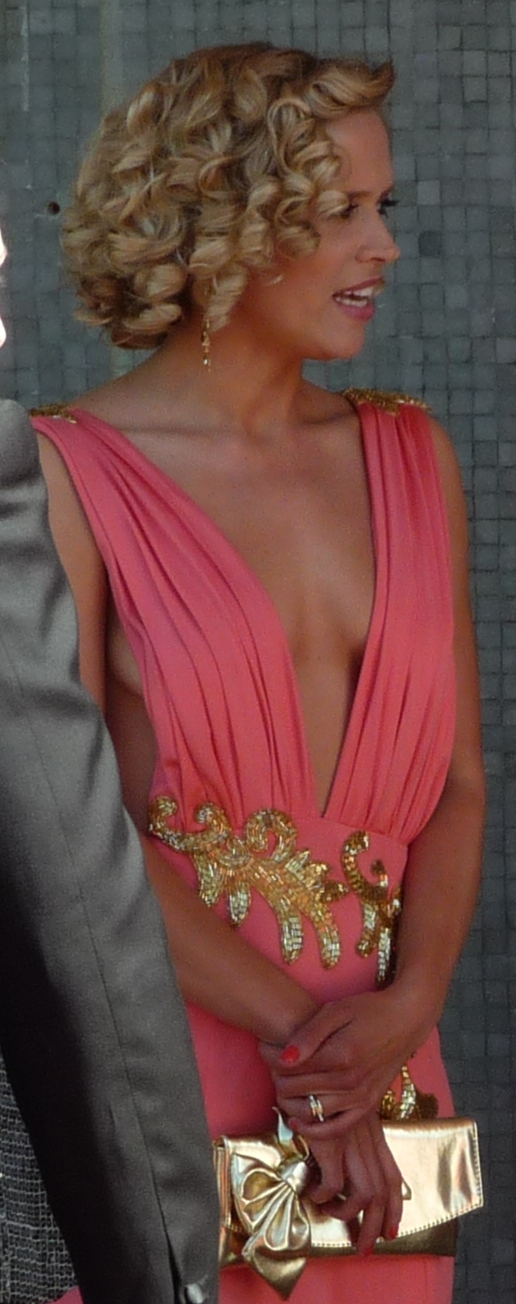
Cameron dates PC Kerry Young, played by Beth Cordingly (pictured), after she almost arrests him during his first episode.

For MacPherson, the storyline was a chance to explore his character's "emotional depths". He stated that the chance to get into more "emotional deep dark stuff" was one of the reasons why he joined The Bill. He, along with the rest of the cast, found filming the storyline "tough" and he praised Nolan for her performance. The actor also explained that the storyline progresses over a number of weeks as Cameron's ordeal goes from bad to worse. MacPherson expressed his surprise at this and he believed it would be a good story arc for viewers to watch. The storyline later ties in with the return of Niamh's father Des Taviner, who is on the run following his part in the fire at Sun Hill, which killed six officers. After Des learns that Cameron was babysitting Niamh the night she died, he blames him for her death and kidnaps Cameron.

==== Relationship with Kerry Young ====
MacPherson and Cordingly's characters soon establish a romance on-screen. Cameron's ordeal with Niamh's death sees him grow closer to Kerry, as she provides comfort and support. MacPherson told the show's official website that he and Cordingly had barely worked together since his introductory scenes in 2003. He admitted that he there was not anyone else he would have wanted to work with on the story. The couple already had an established chemistry, and were able to talk about their scenes and rehearse them together.

Cameron and Kerry unknowingly become pawns in PC Gabriel Kent's (Todd Carty) manipulation of the team at Sun Hill. When Kerry has a one-night stand with Sergeant Dale "Smithy" Smith (Alex Walkinshaw), which she struggles to remember, Gabriel plants the idea that she was date-raped. Cordingly told Claire Brand of Inside Soap that viewers only saw a kiss between Kerry and Smithy, so it is "all very ambiguous." She also told Brand that Kerry is in "a real mess" and while she is going back and forth about whether Smithy is guilty or not, Gabriel tells everyone at the station that Smithy raped Kerry. In the midst of this, the team are called to a siege at a local bank and Smithy takes control of the situation. Cameron takes the opportunity to question him about the rumour, just as a man with a bomb strapped to him is pushed outside. Cordingly said that by the time Kerry turns up, "Smithy and Cameron are having a huge row". Kerry opts to stay with the man and the bomb in a car park almost as a challenge to Smithy. She continued, "Obviously Cameron doesn't want her to put herself in that position, because he cares about her – but he also doesn't think that she's in the right frame of mind. However, she still does it!" As Kerry tries to keep the man calm, Cameron demands the truth about her and Smithy. Cordingly called the scenes "very dramatic" and said they build to a big climax, where Kerry is distracted and the bomb goes off. The episode ends with Kerry unconscious on the ground and Cameron shouting her name.

Shortly after Cameron and Kerry get engaged, The Bill broadcast scenes showing Kerry being raped by Gabriel. Carty explained that his character thinks there is a connection between himself and Kerry, saying "He fancies Kerry and he is jealous of her and Cameron's happiness. When she invites him to tea, he's reading the signals very wrongly." Cameron and Kerry's relationship begins to break down in the wake of the attack at the hands of Gabriel. An Inside Soap columnist stated that as Cameron deals with "this awful setback", he would find comfort from someone else. During the two-part episode "Insensitivity", both Cameron and PC Honey Harman (Kim Tiddy) are left with "serious trauma" after a job dealing with a Justice For Dads campaigner grows suddenly worse. The pair come across two children trapped in a sinking car and are unsuccessful in their frantic attempts to save them. The "devastating outcome" threatens to change Cameron and Honey's attitudes to policing. When Kerry returns to the station, following suspension, to declare her love for Cameron, she discovers him kissing Honey in the locker room. Tiddy admitted to being embarrassed about kissing MacPherson in front of his real-life girlfriend. She explained that kissing scenes were always awkward to film, but she found the Cameron/Honey kiss difficult because she was friends with both actors.

==== Departure ====
In February 2004, MacPherson announced that he was leaving The Bill in order to pursue film roles. He also admitted that he missed his home in Australia, and he stated: "I've enjoyed my time on The Bill immensely." A show spokesperson confirmed his departure and said that writers would come up with "an explosive exit" for MacPherson, adding "Bosses are currently working on a major 'out' storyline for him which will screen later this year." MacPherson filmed his final scenes on 30 May 2004, and they went to air on 22 July 2004. Cameron leaves Sun Hill after a fight with Gabriel, which leaves him facing disciplinary action from Inspector Gina Gold (Roberta Taylor). The storyline is part of Gabriel's ongoing obsession with Kerry. Gabriel uses her rape to goad and taunt Cameron at every opportunity. An Inside Soap writer observed that Cameron "finally cracks under the pressure and his frustrations surface in a violent outburst." Cameron chooses to resign and return to Australia, but Kerry opts not to go with him. Kris Green of Digital Spy wrote that they share "a heart-rending farewell" in his recap of the episode. In a 2015 interview published in The Courier-Mail, MacPherson spoke fondly of his time working on The Bill, saying "I haven't been as excited about my acting career as I was in my early 20s. I was 21, just finished up from Neighbours and moved to London by myself. They were exciting days, the pound was earning $3 Australian and I would spend a great deal of my downtime going to Spain to surf on the weekends. I really loved it, and being so warmly welcome into The Bill by the stars of the show. The guys that played Jim Carver, Tony Stamp and Reg Hollis, they were wonderful characters and wonderful people to work with."

== Reception ==
For his portrayal of Cameron, MacPherson received a nomination for Most Popular Newcomer at the 9th National Television Awards in October 2003. A reporter for The Sydney Morning Herald said MacPherson was the favourite to win the award, but he lost out to Nigel Harman of EastEnders. The reporter also stated that MacPherson had become "an audience favourite" since his debut in The Bill. Executive producer Paul Marquess also pointed out that MacPherson was very popular with younger viewers of The Bill due to his stint on Neighbours. A Daily Record reporter observed that the character's entrance was "rather unorthodox". They also opined that MacPherson was introduced to be "the new eye candy" for the viewers. Cameron Adams of the Herald Sun singled out MacPherson's first episode as part of his television choices feature. He quipped "This is the episode where former Neighbours shirt-remover Daniel McPherson arrives in Sun Hill without hair and indeed without clothes. His first scene sees him wandering around his house nude and listening to Coldplay."

The character's good looks were often remarked upon, with a columnist for The Daily Telegraph calling him "hunky". Another writer for the newspaper branded Cameron "a new Sun Hill bobby dazzler", while Sue Carroll of the Daily Mirror dubbed him "the boy wonder from Down Under" and commented that "he makes an arresting sight". Another critic for The Daily Telegraph called Cameron a "twinkly Aussie plod", while an Evening Herald reporter branded him "laid-back". An Irish Independent columnist thought he was "lovestruck" over Kerry. A number of episodes featuring Cameron were chosen by Daily Record critics for their Pick of Day or Pick of the Box feature, including his first day on duty, his reaction to Niamh's death, and his and Honey's attempt to save two children from the Thames, which they branded "a life-changing case".
