= Kerry Young (The Bill) =

- The Bill character
- First appearance: "Too Close to the Wind"; 11 July 2002
- Last appearance: "Friendly Fire (Part Two)"; 21 October 2004
- Portrayed by: Beth Cordingly
- Spin offs: The Bill Uncovered: Kerry's Story (2004)

In-universe information
- Title: Police Constable
- Occupation: Police officer
- Spouse: Luke Ashton (2002–2003)
- Significant others: Dale Smith; Cameron Tait
- Relatives: George Young (father)

Kerry Young is a fictional character from the British police procedural television series The Bill, played by Beth Cordingly. She first appeared in the eighteenth series episode "Too Close to the Wind", broadcast on 11 July 2002. Kerry was introduced as a police constable, who joins the Metropolitan Police ("the Met") at Sun Hill police station. Cordingly's casting, and the creation of her character, occurred after a large number of previous characters had been written out of the show by its new executive producer Paul Marquess.

Ahead of her audition, Cordingly worried that, because of her past roles, she might be typecast as a bitch. However, Marquess met all the new actors and wrote their characters around them, and Cordingly was relieved when Kerry's biography was full of "nice stuff". To prepare for the role, Cordingly spent time with the Met to learn about their daily routine and joined them for a day out in a squad car, which she admitted left her with motion sickness.

Kerry was initially portrayed as confident, bubbly, down-to-earth and impulsive. Cordingly said her character preferred to get on with things instead of analysing them, but sometimes her attitude frustrated her older colleagues. Cordingly enjoyed playing a character that was likeable, as opposed to some of her previous roles. However, Kerry became seen as a victim in her first year, because everything went wrong for her. She eventually began to grow stronger and harden up, as well as becoming tougher in her career too.

Cordingly found Kerry's police uniform helped her get into character, but she found it was unflattering and likened herself to the Michelin man when she wore it. A lot of Kerry's storylines focused on her love life. In her early scenes, Kerry had a one-night stand with PC Nick Klein (René Zagger). She later established a relationship with PC Luke Ashton (Scott Neal), which developed into a love triangle when he had an affair with Sergeant Craig Gilmore (Hywel Simons). Kerry and Luke eventually marry and she becomes pregnant, but she miscarries when she learns of Luke's affair. Cordingly thought that storyline went on for too long and found it hard credibly portray Kerry's ignorance regarding her husband.

Kerry later had a brief affair with Sergeant Dale "Smithy" Smith (Alex Walkinshaw), before she began a relationship with Australian PC Cameron Tait (Daniel MacPherson), whom she had to arrest in his debut episode. Cordingly and McPherson began a relationship in real life which they found helped them with their characters in later storylines.

In April 2004, Kerry was targeted by PC Gabriel Kent (Todd Carty), who manipulated her into thinking that Smithy had date-raped her. Cordingly pointed out that the audience saw a kiss between Smithy and Kerry and nothing else, leaving it ambiguous as to what happened. Gabriel used that to his advantage and told their colleagues Smithy had date-raped Kerry. In the midst of that, the shift were called to a bank siege, where Kerry volunteered to isolate with a man who had a bomb strapped to his chest. The storyline came to a dramatic climax when the bomb went off while Kerry was distracted, leaving her unconscious. Cordingly enjoyed being involved in the stunts during filming. Gabriel's obsession with Kerry led him to rape her, shortly after she became engaged to Cameron. Kerry did not report the rape and Carty believed it was because of her earlier accusation against Smithy, which would make her look like "the girl who cried wolf".

In an effort to prove that she was a good officer, Kerry went undercover with the Radfords, a local crime family. As she became romantically involved with David Radford (Alex McSweeney), Cordingly said Kerry's loyalties were divided, due to her disillusionment with the force and clashing with Inspector Gina Gold (Roberta Taylor). Lynda Bellingham said her character, Irene Radford, wanted to turn Kerry against the force. Cordingly was unsure whose side Kerry was on during the storyline.

On 29 March 2004, it was announced Cordingly had decided to leave the show. She had planned to go in January 2004, but chose to go out at "a climax point" for her character instead. Producers decided to kill her off and make her the fourth victim of the Sun Hill sniper. In the lead up to her final scenes, Kerry was arrested for her involvement with the Radford family, She uncovered Gabriel's real identity, and discovered that Andrea Dunbar (Natalie J. Robb) was actually an undercover journalist. Kerry also realised that she loved Smithy, who also declared his love for her. Cordingly made her final appearance as Kerry on 20 October 2004, when she was shot by Gabriel outside the station. ITV later aired a special episode about the character, titled The Bill Uncovered: Kerry's Story.

== Casting ==
In November 2001, a reporter for The Stage confirmed Beth Cordingly had joined the cast of The Bill. Her casting came shortly after the show's executive producer Paul Marquess wrote out a number of characters in a storyline that saw a fire sweep through Sun Hill station. Over the following weeks, Marquess introduced several new characters to the show, including PC Kerry Young. Cordingly felt that going into her audition for The Bill she would be typecast as "an out-and-out bitch" because of her roles as Sara Warrington in Family Affairs and Norma Kennedy in Semi-Monde. She explained "Paul Marquess, the producer, met actors then wrote the characters around them. It was nerve-wracking for me. I'd been cast as two very strong, bitchy, destructive women previously what if The Bill people wrote that sort of part for me again? If another bitch came up then that had to mean I came across that way. So when I got Kerry's biography through and it was full of nice stuff I was very relieved." Cordingly was both surprised and "thrilled" when she won the role of Kerry. Her first day on set was 7 January 2002. The following month she carried out research into her character's career by spending time with the Met to learn about their daily routine. She joined them for a day out in a squad car driving around London. Cordingly admitted the speed at which they drove left her feeling ill with "a sort of motion sickness." She made her debut as Kerry on 11 July 2002.

== Development ==
=== Characterisation ===
Kerry Young, 23, is a confident and sparky young woman. She is down to earth, vital and upbeat, refusing to be depressed at what life throws at her. Gregarious and friendly, Kerry has always enjoyed a group situation, thriving on the approval of others. A career in the police offered her a team atmosphere and ordered structure that she craved from the services, so she signed herself up straight from school. A young woman living life to the full, she does still have an unfulfilled wanderlust... at least in theory anyway.

— An excerpt from the character's biography on the official website.

Kerry was initially billed as "a confident woman who lands in some tricky situations." Kerry's profile on the show's official website describes her as impulsive, optimistic, willing to "get her hands dirty" and a "believer in fate". Cordingly enjoyed playing a character that was not "a real bitch" unlike her previous roles. She called Kerry "loving, confident and bubbly", as well as likeable, "open with everybody" and attractive to men. She said Kerry often "leaps before she looks", and was not one for analysing things, as she would rather just get on with it. Sometimes her attitude leads to frustration from her older colleagues, but her "natural charm" almost always sees someone willing to help her out of bad situations. Her profile also states that she has a tendency to become "petulant" if her charm does not work and someone dislikes her. In her fictional backstory, Kerry was raised by her single father, following the death of her mother when she was young. This has led Kerry to look for "the perfect fairytale marriage", which results in her establishing relationships that inevitably fail.

Cordingly was keen to wear Kerry's police uniform when she started out and found that it helped her get into character. However, after a few months of filming, she said that it was not sexy at all and believed she resembled the Michelin man when wearing it. Describing the uniform for a piece in the Sunday Mirror, Cordingly wrote: "On my feet are huge army boots. Then we have the trousers. Nice and sturdy. Now come the layers – shirt, jumper and bulbous stab-vest (which makes me look like a turtle)." She said the belt to which the various pieces of police equipment were attached made sure that viewers could not see that she had a waist. She likened the coat to something worn by Paddington Bear, while the hat was in the "Laurel and Hardy-style". Cordingly thought she looked "hilarious" and believed her co-stars looked both "cool and relaxed" while she felt like King Kong.

A year after her introduction, Cordingly stated that her character had changed "quite a lot over time" and was starting to harden up. She thought they were both "defensive and protective" when it came to their feelings, but Kerry was "more of a doer" and very impulsive. Cordingly admitted that she would think things through before reacting and was more of a worrier, but she said Kerry was more physical, whereas she would "stress about something" before acting. Cordingly later said that Kerry had had "a crazy life". She explained that when she joined The Bill, she wanted to play someone different to her Family Affairs character and Kerry was "a victim rather than the one creating trouble."

While talking about Kerry's early scenes with the Sunday Mail's Mickey McMonagle, Cordingly said "I've been on The Bill for about a year and a half and in my first year I had loads of storylines. It was all quite mad and traumatic with gay husbands and miscarriages and lots of tears. She was happily bobbing along being lovely and everything kept going wrong for her. I have had great stories and stuff but it has been a little bit boring playing nice all the time. I'd like to see her stretched a bit more." Cordingly agreed that her character was "very much the victim" in her first year, but she had started working on new plots that would put Kerry "on a different journey" and would see her becoming stronger. She said Kerry would become "a lot tougher police-wise too", which she found "odd to play" because Kerry had been "so nice" up to that point and now she was being unsympathetic to rape victims. Cordingly enjoyed the challenge of changing her character into "a powerful, no-nonsense PC."

=== Relationships ===
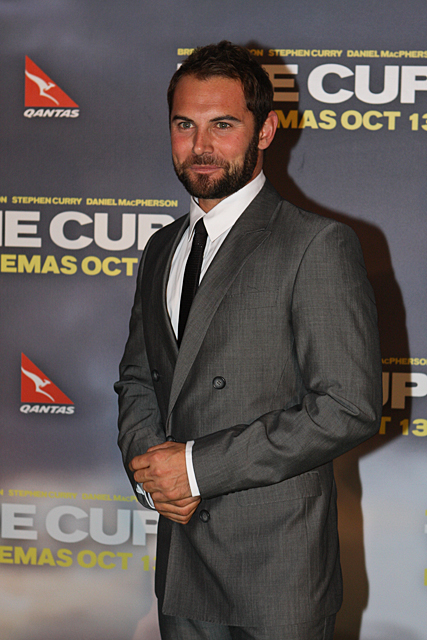
Kerry forms a relationship with PC Cameron Tait, played by Cordingly's then-boyfriend Daniel MacPherson (pictured).

The majority of Kerry's storylines focused on her love life. Cordingly thought that her character "hurls herself into a relationship" when she receives "the slightest bit of affection". When she was introduced, Jo Haywood of Inside Soap confirmed that Kerry would get off to a bad start at Sun Hill when she learns that Nick Klein (René Zagger), who she had a recent one-night stand with, is actually a fellow PC. Kerry was also in a relationship with solicitor Martin Porter (Simon Chadwick) at the time. Not long after, she "caught the attention" of PC Luke Ashton (Scott Neal) and they begin dating. However, Luke is also having an affair with their sergeant Craig Gilmore (Hywel Simons). Kerry and Luke's relationship becomes strained when Martin is arrested on suspicion of being a serial killer. Kerry is "stunned" by the news and begs Gilmore to let her see Martin, but he refuses. With Martin's "predicament weighing on her mind", Kerry's relationship with Luke starts to suffer. Eventually Luke and Kerry get engaged, despite Luke's continued affair with Gilmore and denial that he is gay. In the build up to the wedding, "a few hitches" occur, including the arrival of Luke's father and "dress disasters".

Luke also has sex with Gilmore on his stag night and they are caught by Inspector Gina Gold (Roberta Taylor). The wedding took place across two episodes on New Year's Eve and New Year's Day 2003. Cordingly thought "the whole gay husband story" went on for too long and questioned why Kerry could not see Luke was gay when it was obvious to everyone else. She told McMonagle (Sunday Mail) that she had to work on making it credible, and explained that Kerry finds that what she gets from Luke in private is enough for her and that their bond is so strong, she believes him over her friends and colleagues. Kerry becomes pregnant, but suffers a miscarriage shortly after learning the truth about Luke and Gilmore. Cordingly enjoyed working with Taylor in the aftermath of Kerry's miscarriage. Describing the scene in which Gina visits her at the hospital, she commented "her reaction to me just made my reaction. The way she said 'Kerry' just got me." She found those moments on set to be "really special" for her as an actress, who was still learning.

After ending her marriage to Luke, Kerry has "a steamy affair" with Sergeant Dale "Smithy" Smith (Alex Walkinshaw) and they are caught having sex in a police car while on duty. Cordingly admitted that her character's kissing scenes were "a bit embarrassing". She explained that she was really nervous when she had to kiss Zagger, but she found it easier to kiss Neal because they had been working together for longer. She warned Walkinshaw that she would blush when filming their kissing first scene, but assured her that he would too, which set her at ease. She continued: "I do have a bit of a problem in that as soon as I find out about a kiss and for about a month afterwards I blush whenever I see that person. I'm like an 1800's woman! I can't help it, it's not like I fancy them or anything but it just happens!"

At the beginning of 2003, producers introduced the show's first Australian police officer Cameron Tait (Daniel MacPherson). His debut episode sees Kerry arrest him for indecent exposure when one of his neighbours mistakes him for a flasher. McPherson and Cordingly began a relationship in real-life shortly after meeting for lunch during his first day. Their characters also establish a relationship on-screen after Cameron turns to Kerry for support, following the death of Sergeant Sheelagh Murphy's (Bernie Nolan) daughter, whom Cameron was babysitting. McPherson said he and Cordingly had barely any scenes together since his arrival, and he could not think of anyone else he would have liked to have acted alongside. He pointed out that they already had the chemistry and were able to discuss and rehearse their scenes together.

=== Date rape accusation and explosion ===
In April 2004, Gabriel Kent (Todd Carty) targets Kerry and manipulates her into thinking that Smithy date raped her, before she is caught up in an explosion. Cordingly explained that viewers see a kiss between Smithy and Kerry and nothing else, so it is ambiguous. However, Kerry cannot remember anything about that night. Gabriel, who hates Smithy, uses this to his advantage and starts trying to convince her that Smithy date raped her. Cordingly stated "Kerry is in a real mess about the whole thing and goes through a few episodes swinging wildly between thinking that he did and then believing that he didn't – playing the role has given me a real headache!" As Kerry concludes that she has not been raped, Gabriel, whom Cordingly said was "very much the new baddie on the show", tells their colleagues about the rape and the news spreads around the station. In the middle of this, the relief shift are called to a bank siege. As Smithy tries to take control of the scene, Cameron chooses that moment to confront him about the rumour. They are interrupted when a man is pushed outside the bank with a bomb strapped to his chest. Cordingly told Claire Brand of Inside Soap that Kerry turns up to find Cameron and Smithy having a big argument, and everything is "spinning wildly out of control for her and, because she is feeling quite kamikaze, Kerry volunteers to take the guy with the bomb and be isolate with him in an empty car park."

Cordingly said that her decision is almost a challenge to Smithy. Meanwhile Cameron does not want her to put herself in harms way because he cares about her, but he also thinks that she is not "in the right frame of mind." However, Kerry goes through with her decision to stay with the man and the bomb. As she is making sure that he does not move, Cameron demands the truth about Smithy. Cordingly described the scenes as "very dramatic" and she likened filming them to an episode of the American medical drama ER. The scenes build to "a massive climax" where Kerry looks away from the man with the bomb for a second and a huge explosion occurs, leaving her unconscious on the floor, with Cameron screaming out her name. Cordingly enjoyed being involved in the stunts during the shoot, despite the cold weather and having to lie in a puddle on the ground. She thought she looked "hilarious" after the explosion because of her sooty make-up. She also told Brand that prior to all the drama, she thought viewers would be divided about the date rape allegation, saying "I think the idea behind it is that they wanted to unite and divide everybody, so you have got people taking sides. Smithy and Kerry have both got histories, so it is not a straightforward situation, and it is left for the viewers to decide." She also opened up about the changes to her character, explaining that Kerry is a much tougher, but less stable person, whereas when she started she was nice and a victim of circumstance.

=== Rape and the Radfords ===
Weeks later, Gabriel's continued obsession with Kerry leads him to rape her. The storyline begins with the announcement of Kerry and Cameron's engagement, which angers Gabriel as he did not hear the news from Kerry herself. An Inside Soap writer observed that Gabriel mistakenly believes there is a connection between them, which leads Gabriel to visit Kerry at her flat. Things between the pair take "a shocking turn" when Gabriel rapes Kerry. Carty commented "In his madness Gabriel thinks that Kerry might fancy him and that she wants a bit of rough. He fancies Kerry and he is jealous of her and Cameron's happiness. When she invites him to tea he's reading the signals very wrongly." Afterwards, Kerry is seen visiting a crisis care worker, but she chooses not to report Gabriel, which gives him confidence that he will get away with assaulting her. Carty pointed out that Gabriel has "paved the way" by planting the idea that Smithy date raped Kerry. He knows that she will be seen as "the girl who cried wolf" if she does report him. Carty said that his character is also aware of her history with Nick and Luke, and he has the CCTV tape of the bombing, which saw Kerry become distracted while on duty. Carty added that the storyline is something that occurs in real life and that The Bill was not afraid to tackle such serious and shocking issues.

Kerry's rape leads to the demise of her relationship with Cameron. She also becomes convinced that Gabriel is the Sun Hill serial rapist, but struggles to gain evidence. When a fight breaks out between Gabriel and Cameron, Gabriel takes every opportunity to taunt his "rival" about Kerry. Cameron "finally cracks under the pressure and his frustrations surface in a violent outburst." The fight is witnessed by Gina, and as Cameron faces disciplinary action, he decides to resign and leave Sun Hill. In August 2004, a new storyline sees Kerry unofficially working undercover in an effort to trap crime family the Radfords. Cordingly explained that her character initially goes undercover to prove that she is a good officer. Even when Smithy warns her about how dangerous the Radfords are, Kerry refuses to give up because she is getting close to them and she is attracted to David Radford (Alex McSweeney). Cordingly stated "It all gets very complicated and the audience won't know what Kerry is thinking. She is disillusioned with the police so her loyalties are divided." Concerned for Kerry's safety and wanting to get her away from the family, Smithy organises "a bogus drugs raid to keep her away from harm." However, he is soon caught and David gives Kerry a gun with an order to shoot Smithy.

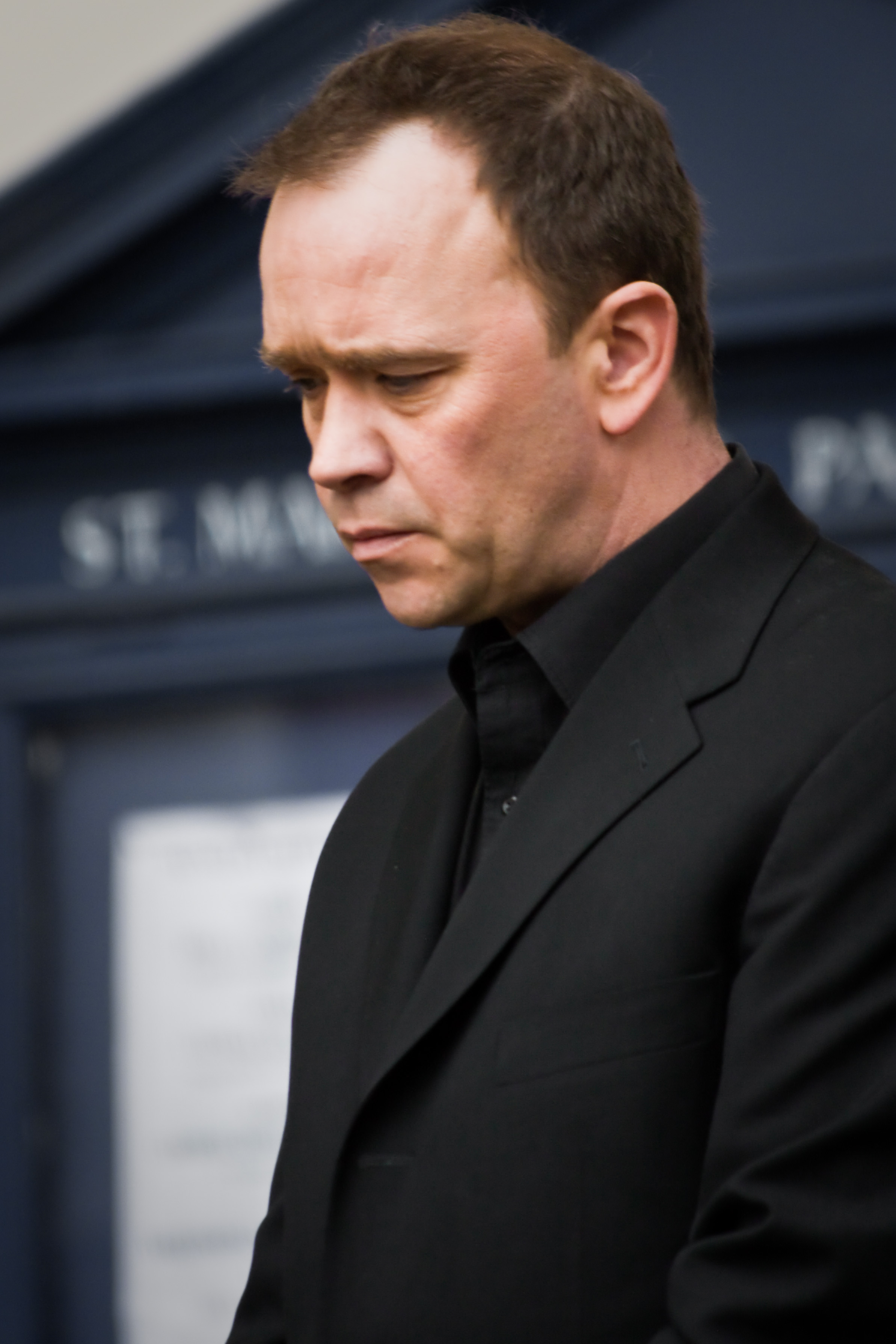
PC Gabriel Kent, played by Todd Carty (pictured), manipulates, rapes and fatally shoots Kerry.

Although she receives repeated warning from her colleagues, Kerry continues to work undercover with the Radfords and gets romantically involved with David. Her frustration with her career and "constant clashes" with Inspector Gold makes Kerry an easy target for the Radfords. Head of the family Irene Radford (Lynda Bellingham) later asks Kerry to help them with a job, which makes her consider cutting ties with the police force. Bellingham told Allison Maund of Inside Soap: "Kerry is in trouble with Gina yet again. Gina has ordered her either to end things with David or leave the Met – before sticking her behind Sun Hill's front desk in disgrace." Gina later follows Kerry and sees her meeting with David, but she claims she was ending their relationship. However, Irene tells Gina that if Kerry wants to see David then that is her business. She then makes Kerry an offer to work for the family. Bellingham explained "As far as the Radfords are concerned, turning a copper against the force is a real score. Kerry's having such a bad run at Sun Hill at the moment, this could well be the right time for her to finally burn all bridges with the Met, and work with the Radfords full-time."

Regarding Kerry's involvement with the Radfords, Sarah Whiteman of Inside Soap wondered whose side she was on, to which Cordingly replied "That's the ultimate question, and I actually find it quite hard to answer. Kerry always wanted to be part of a family so she's strangely attracted to the Radfords. There's a sort of anarchic side to her as well, because of everything around her that's fallen apart. You have to remember she was thrown off centre by the horrendous experience of being raped, which left her completely unstable." Kerry is later arrested for her involvement with the Radfords, but she is soon bailed.

=== Departure ===
On 29 March 2004, it was announced Cordingly had decided to leave The Bill, as she wanted to pursue new roles in theatre, film and television. Kris Green of Digital Spy reported that producers had promised Cordingly "an explosive exit" which would be filmed during the UK summer. Cordingly asked to leave the show early and had planned to go in January 2004, but the storylines for Kerry "were so good" she chose to go out at "a climax point" for the character instead. She said "I was given a long contract, I decided to leave on a high, while my character was going through some really challenging times. The workload has been exhausting but really worth it." Up until her departure, Cordingly was filming six days a week for twelve hours, which she admitted left her feeling tired. Cordingly thought her decision to leave when she did gave the producers "the right" to do what they wanted with Kerry. They chose to kill her off and make her the fourth victim of the Sun Hill sniper.

Kerry's final appearance aired on 20 October 2004, as she is shot outside the station. In the lead up to her final scenes, Kerry's involvement with the Radford family comes to a conclusion, she uncovers Gabriel's real identity, and discovers Andrea Dunbar (Natalie J. Robb) is an undercover journalist. Cordingly explained that Kerry has also been visiting her sick father and makes a promise to herself that she will "face up to things" if he lives. She continued "Kerry basically doesn't care anymore. She's going to tell Gina everything." At the same time, Kerry also comes to realise that she has strong feelings for Smithy, who declares his love for her. Cordingly described the moment that Smithy tells Kerry he loves her as "quite a nice scene" in the middle of a lot of heaviness. She told Whiteman (Inside Soap) that as Kerry has previously said "I love you" to Cameron, Luke, and various other people, she and the writers did not want it to seem that like she says it to everyone. There needed to be a moment where it came to her as "a true realisation", which is why her last words are "I love you Smithy".

Whiteman stated that "in true Kerry fashion" things do not go as planned for the character. Just as she is about to head inside the station to see Gina, a gunshot rings out and Kerry collapses to the ground and lies bleeding in Smithy's arms. Cordingly called Kerry's death "really sad" because she was about to be happy with the right man after all her trauma. Cordingly also disliked the feeling of being shot and admitted to being "really wobbly" when Kerry looks up at Smithy and asks him to help her. She added that she knew she would be sad on her last day of filming, but as she got into character and thought about being shot, she could not stop crying. Following Kerry's death, ITV aired a special episode of The Bill Uncovered titled Kerry's Story. Narrated by Gabriel Kent, the episode revisits Kerry's life from her first day at Sun Hill until her death. Farah Faouque The Sydney Morning Herald branded the episode a "cheerless outing", saying viewers follow the character's "descent from happy-go-lucky officer to victim" mostly because of her "bad taste in blokes."

In the aftermath of Kerry's death, her killer is soon revealed to be Gabriel. While he covers his tracks, Smithy "goes completely off the rails" and accuses David Radford instead. Kerry's funeral takes place under the strictest security as the sniper has yet to be caught. There is also a high degree of tension due to the "explosive secrets" that Kerry took to the grave. Gabriel offers to read at the service, before he breaks down in tears. Walkinshaw stated "It's quite a shock for everyone, not just Smithy. People didn't think that Gabriel and Kerry were that close, but Smithy is too overcome with grief to confront Gabriel about his actions at the funeral. It's not that Smithy thinks Gabriel doesn't have the right to mourn Kerry, but when he breaks down it seems inappropriate – it's just so out of the blue. Some people are surprised, some are embarrassed, but Smithy is livid!" The revelation that Kerry was carrying Gabriel's child, as the result of the rape, further enrages Smithy and he confronts Gabriel in the pub. Walkinshaw said that his character knows Kerry did not like Gabriel, so he cannot believe they had any type of relationship. Cordingly admitted that she was planning on watching the filming of her character's funeral, but chose to go on holiday instead, as she felt that she needed to get away. After learning that the funeral was in the newspapers, Cordingly felt "wobbly", but she said she could not think of a better exit storyline.

== Reception ==
Mickey McMonagle of the Sunday Mail opined that Kerry was always "the innocent victim" in her early storylines and that the scriptwriters liked to pile "on the misery". An Inside Soap critic thought Kerry and Luke's "much-anticipated" wedding was "certainly worth the wait", but wondered what the show would surprise the audience with next, following its conclusion. Another writer for the publication observed that Kerry was popular with viewers and said she had a "colourful career at Sun Hill".

The Daily Mirror's Jim Shelley called the relationship between Luke and Kerry "rather tedious" and thought that the wedding and pregnancy were both "improbable". Shelley also wrote "It doesn't say much for Kerry's chances of promotion to CID that it took her so long to work out Luke was gay." Shelley's colleague Jane Simon also bemoaned Kerry's lack of good sense, saying "Helping to plan an armed robbery probably wasn't the cleverest way to prove her worth as an undercover cop, and now she's gone missing."

Sarah Whiteman of Inside Soap thought Kerry had a "turbulent life", and said she "left an intriguing legacy for viewers." Another Inside Soap writer branded Kerry's death "tragic and dramatic." While reviewing Kerry's funeral, Terry Ramsey of the Evening Standard observed "Hers was not a happy time at Sun Hill, even by the station's usual depressing standards."
