= Judi Bowker =

English actress (born 1954)

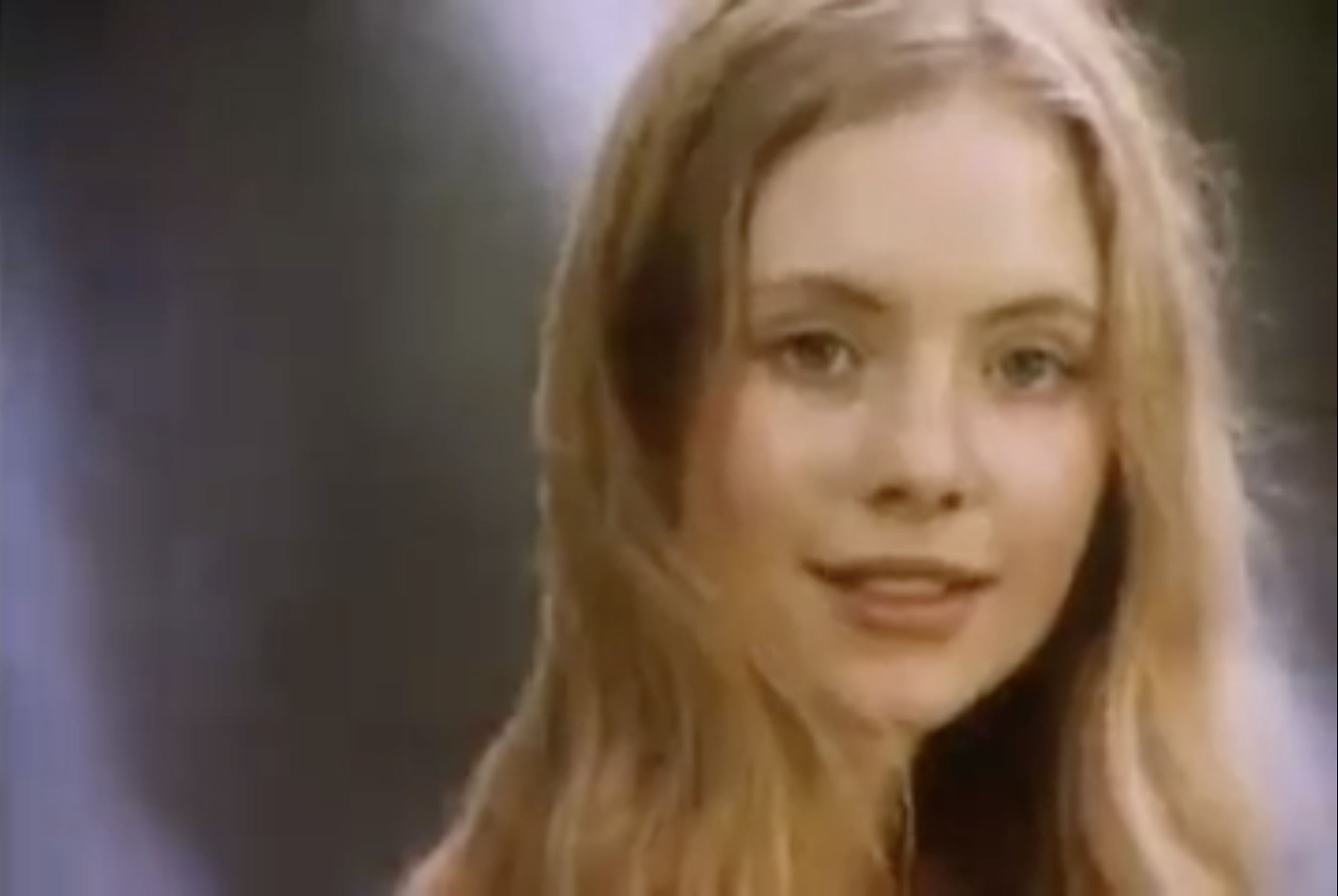
- Bowker in the 1972 film Brother Sun, Sister Moon
- Born: 6 April 1954 (age 72); Shawford, Hampshire, England
- Occupation: Actress
- Years active: 1972–present
- Spouse: Harry Meacher (m. 1979)

Judi Bowker (born 6 April 1954) is an English film and television actress.

== Early life ==
Bowker was born in Shawford, Hampshire, England, the daughter of Alfred J. Bowker and Ann Fairweather, who had married in 1947. The family moved to the British colony of Northern Rhodesia when Bowker was two, and lived there for eight years. She had many interests, including painting and riding. However, she was most interested in acting, and began to pursue her acting career after the family returned to England.

== Career ==
Bowker first came to international attention as the star of The Adventures of Black Beauty (1972), a television series which was a continuation of the book. In an interview, Bowker stated that her experience in riding horses was probably the key to being cast in the role. She also recalled how some of the Black Beauty episodes were set in springtime, but filmed in winter, so that sometimes she had to wear summer outfits in cold weather.

Also in 1972 Bowker starred as Saint Clare of Assisi in Franco Zeffirelli's Brother Sun, Sister Moon. The runner-up for the part was Lynne Frederick.

Her well-known film appearances are as Mina Harker in the 1977 film Count Dracula, Andromeda in the Ray Harryhausen film, Clash of the Titans (1981), and as the unhappily married Lady Olivia Lilburn in the Alan Bridges adaptation of Isabel Colegate's novel The Shooting Party (1985).

She has appeared in numerous theatre productions including major roles in Hedda Gabler, Macbeth, Ivanov, A Midsummer Night's Dream, Three Sisters, and in her husband Harry Meacher's adaptation of Sherlock Holmes.

She was cast as a narrator for a BBC audiobook adaptation of the work of P. D. James in 2018.

== Personal life ==
Bowker has been married to the actor Harry Meacher since 1979 and, as of 2017, has lived near – and worked in productions at – the Upstairs at the Gatehouse theatre in Highgate for decades.

== Filmography ==
- Brother Sun, Sister Moon (1972)
- In This House of Brede (1975)
- East of Elephant Rock (1977)
- Clash of the Titans (1981) – Andromeda
- The Shooting Party (1985) – Lady Olivia Lilburn
- 10 Arenas of Marwood (2011)
- Feast of Varanasi (2016)

== Television ==
- The Adventures of Black Beauty (1972) – TV series
- Dr. Jekyll and Mr. Hyde (1973)
- South Riding (1974)
- In This House of Brede (1975)
- Play for Today (1975) – two episodes
- The Picture of Dorian Gray (1976)
- Hindle Wakes (1976)
- Count Dracula (1977) – Mina Harker
- Tales of the Unexpected, "The Best of Everything" (1981) – one episode
- Wilfred and Eileen (1981)
- Little Miss Perkins (1982)
- Ellis Island (1984) – TV miniseries
- Anna Karenina (1985)
- Sins (1986) – TV miniseries
- Worlds Beyond, "The Haunted Garden" (1987) – one episode
- Menace Unseen (1988) – TV miniseries
- Kurtulus (1994) – TV miniseries
- The Bill (series 19) (2003) – TV series

== Theatre ==
- Macbeth (1978) – National Theatre, Olivier Theatre
- Hedda Gabler (1998) – Pentameters, Inner London
- Hay Fever (2016) – Logos Theater
- Copperfield (2021) – Lauderdale House
