= Meacher =

Meacher is a surname. Notable people with the surname include:

- Harry Meacher, British actor, director, and playwright
- Michael Meacher (1939–2015), British academic and politician
- Molly Meacher, Baroness Meacher (born 1940), British life peer and former social worker
