= The Shooting Party =

1984 British drama film directed by Alan Bridges

- Film poster
- Directed by: Alan Bridges
- Written by: Isabel Colegate (novel); Julian Bond
- Produced by: Geoffrey Reeve
- Starring: James Mason; Edward Fox; Dorothy Tutin; John Gielgud; Gordon Jackson; Cheryl Campbell; Robert Hardy; Aharon Ipalé; Joris Stuyck; Rebecca Saire; Sarah Badel
- Music by: John Scott
- Distributed by: Curzon Film Distributors
- Release dates: 16 May 1984 (Cannes Film Market); February 1985 (United Kingdom)
- Running time: 98 minutes
- Country: United Kingdom
- Language: English

The Shooting Party is a 1984 British drama film directed by Alan Bridges and based on the book of the same name by Isabel Colegate. The film is set in 1913, less than a year before the beginning of the First World War, and shows a vanishing way of life among English aristocrats, focusing on a shooting party gathered for pheasant shooting. Their situation is contrasted with the life of the local rural poor, who work on the estate and during the shoot serve as beaters, driving the game. It was entered into the 14th Moscow International Film Festival.

== Synopsis ==
In the autumn of 1913, a large party of guests gather at the estate of Sir Randolph Nettleby and his wife Minnie for a weekend of shooting. Over the next few days two of the guests, Gilbert, Lord Hartlip and Lionel Stephens, engage in an escalating contest over who can shoot the most game. Hartlip is a renowned sportsman threatened by Stephens's skill, while Stephens is anxious to impress his sweetheart, the married Olivia. Hartlip's wife, Aline, is carrying on an indiscreet love affair with another guest, Sir Reuben Hergesheimer. Meanwhile, the Nettlebys' granddaughter Cicely is allowing herself to be courted by the Hungarian Count Rakassyi, much to the chagrin of her mother Ida.

All of the characters' personal tensions reach breaking point when someone is killed accidentally on the final day of shooting, leading the guests to reconsider their relationships. The closing credits reveal the names of those members of the shooting party who later were killed in the First World War.

== Cast ==
- James Mason as Sir Randolph Nettleby
- Edward Fox as Gilbert, Lord Hartlip
- Dorothy Tutin as Minnie, Lady Nettleby
- John Gielgud as Cornelius Cardew
- Gordon Jackson as Tom Harker
- Cheryl Campbell as Aline, Lady Hartlip
- Robert Hardy as Bob, Lord Lilburn
- Aharon Ipalé as Sir Reuben Hergesheimer
- Joris Stuyck as Count Tibor Rakassyi
- Rebecca Saire as Cicely Nettleby
- Sarah Badel as Ida Nettleby
- Rupert Frazer as Lionel Stephens
- Judi Bowker as Olivia, Lady Lilburn
- Warren Saire as Marcus Nettleby
- John J. Carney as Jarvis
- Ann Castle as Mildred, Lady Stamp
- Daniel Chatto as John
- Mia Fothergill as Violet
- Thomas Heathcote as Ogden
- Barry Jackson as Weir
- Jonathon Lacey as Dan Glass
- Richard Leech as Dr. West
- Jack May as Sir Harry Stamp
- Deborah Miles as Ellen
- Daniel Moynihan as Maidment
- Patrick O'Connell as Charlie Lyne
- Nicholas Pietrek as Osbert
- Lockwood West as Rogers
- Frank Windsor as Glass

== Analysis ==
There is a general feeling of the end of a way of life, as the characters go about their lives unaware of the coming war and the changes it will bring.

Released posthumously, this is the last film appearance by James Mason, who plays Sir Randolph Nettleby, the local landowner who has something of the old values. Edward Fox as Gilbert Lord Hartlip represents the newer type of aristocrat who does not have the same solid beliefs: he gets into a competition over who is the best shot, despite his host's disapproval.

== Production ==
According to the DVD extras documentary, Paul Scofield was cast as Sir Randolph Nettleby, but he was seriously injured during the first shot on the first day of shooting. Because the film takes place in October, during partridge-shooting season, the filmmakers had to make a choice, either to delay filming for a year or re-cast the role. James Mason was finishing the filming of Doctor Fischer of Geneva for the BBC, and the schedule was changed to allow him to take over the part of Nettleby, six weeks later.

The film was shot at Knebworth House in Hertfordshire.

== Reception ==
Critic Pauline Kael gave the film a positive review and wrote "Bridges has a special gift for these evocations of a world seen in a bell jar, and now, with Geoffrey Reeve as producer and Fred Tammes as cinematographer, he has refined his techniques."

In September 1985, Roger Ebert gave the film three stars and concluded his review: "This is the sort of small, intelligent and civilized film that we have to find in Europe, because American actors of the same caliber would not want to appear in small roles with so many of their equals. The movie is a reminder that American films are usually about one or two stars and a handful of well-known character actors, while Europeans are still capable of pitching in together for an ensemble piece. There is nothing new in the message of this film, but a great deal of artistry in its telling".

As of December 2023, the film holds a 100% fresh rating on the Rotten Tomatoes website, based on six reviews.
