= The Bill series 19 =

The Bill
- Series 19
- Series 19 DVD cover
- No. of episodes: 105

Release
- Original network: ITV
- Original release: 1 January – 31 December 2003

Series chronology
- ← Previous; Series 18 Next → Series 20

Series 19 of British television drama The Bill was broadcast from 1 January until 31 December 2003. The series consists of 106 episodes, being the longest series broadcast during the show's final decade, and also included the show's first live broadcast, "Fatal Consequences".

== Storylines ==
This series built upon the serialized format previously introduced by new producer Paul Marquess in Series 18, with the series following on from the previous series by removing and replacing a mass number of characters. The most high-profile exit was that of Sergeant Matt Boyden, whose death was part of a crossover with new spin-off series Murder Investigation Team. Actor Tony O'Callaghan, who was with the show for 12 years, became the fourth character with more than ten years on the show to have been written out in the 18 months since Marquess took over, with three of those four characters being killed off.

=== Anniversary ===
This series saw the show celebrate its 20th anniversary on air with both a live episode and an episode featuring one of the show's most ambitious stunts to date, where PC Des Taviner is supposedly killed in an explosion in a gas tower after being exposed as the culprit of the Sun Hill fire, which claimed the lives of six officers back in April 2002. This storyline also saw a guest stint by former DI Sally Johnson (Jaye Griffiths), who ultimately exposes Taviner and manages to bully DC Danny Glaze into tendering his resignation, in fear of his part in the plot to frame murder suspect Jeff Simpson being revealed.

For the live broadcast, a storyline was devised whereby DC Juliet Becker (Rae Baker) was held hostage in the back of a police van at knifepoint, being fatally stabbed as a result. Despite being in the show for only five months, the storyline paved the way for Baker's exit. This episode also featured a live stunt in which PC Gary Best fell from the roof of the station after fighting with his father's killer. All but three of the current cast members featured in the live broadcast, and thus, owing to its success on the night, a second live broadcast was commissioned for 2005, to celebrate the 50th Anniversary of ITV1.

=== Later episodes ===
After the show moved focus onto more soap opera type storylines in series 18, several long-term plots from this series focused on the personal lives of the characters. PC Nick Klein, who became addicted to cocaine in series 18, escalated into a crack addict that resulted in him having a stint in rehab. PC Luke Ashton was involved in a plot over a number of months that saw him come to terms with his homosexuality, marrying and later divorcing PC Kerry Young before leaving the show, actor Scott Neal's second stint ending after just over a year. Sergeant June Ackland took centre stage as she began a relationship with new character Gabriel Kent, portrayed by former Grange Hill and EastEnders actor Todd Carty, only for it to be revealed he was her long lost son; Kent would go on to become one of the show's most notorious villains. PC Jim Carver also had a major, long-term storyline, marrying victim of crime Marie Graham (Melanie Hill), later becoming subject to domestic violence.

In 2024, executive producer Paul Marquess was interviewed about his work on The Bill in a three-part The Bill Podcast interview by Natalie Roles, who played DS Debbie McAllister (2000–2004), where he reveals a website was created urging for his death in response to the changes he made to the series.

== DVD release ==
On 16 October 2013, the complete series was released on DVD in Australia as a Region 0, playable anywhere in the world. The DVD synopsis uses the original episode numbering system, rather than the Episode names, which weren't used from 2002 to 2007.

== Cast changes ==
=== Arrivals ===
- PC Cameron Tait ("Thinking Out Loud"–)
- Sgt Sheelagh Murphy ("False Pride"–)
- PC Honey Harman ("Throw for A Loss"–)
- PC Polly Page ("The Square Apple"–) – Returning character
- Sgt Dale Smith ("Boomerang Part 2"–) – Returning character
- DC Juliet Becker ("Rescue"–"Fatal Consequences")
- DC Ramani DeCosta ("Count Me Out"–)
- PC Gabriel Kent ("Home Run (Part 1)"–)
- DC Terry Perkins ("Truth"–)
- CADO Dean McVerry ("The Dirty Dozen"–)
- DC Rob Thatcher ("Haunted, Part One"–)
- PC Yvonne Hemmingway ('"Antecedent"–)
- SRO Marilyn Chambers ("Fatality"–)
- DI Neil Manson ("Chasing the Dragon"–)

=== Departures ===
- DC Duncan Lennox – Returns to MIT after his secondment to Sun Hill ends
- Sgt Craig Gilmore – Requests transfer after being seriously assaulted
- Sgt Matthew Boyden – Shot dead on duty from the order of his estranged daughter
- PC Gemma Osbourne – Resigns after collapsing from injuries sustained in an assault
- PC Luke Ashton – Transfers to another station after breakdown of marriage with PC Kerry Young
- PC Ruby Buxton – Resigns after committing perjury
- CADO Roberta Cryer – Dismissed after ignoring an urgent assistance call
- DC Danny Glaze – Resigns after being exposed for the 2002 station fire cover-up
- DC Juliet Becker – Dies in hospital after being fatally stabbed during hostage situation
- DC Mickey Webb – Transfers to MIT (temporary departure)

== Episodes ==
#	Title	Episode notes	Directed by	Written by	Original air date	Prod #
1	"Out of a Clear Blue Sky"	Jesse Birdsall guest stars	Penelope Shales	Marianne Colbran	1 January 2003	076
Hunter reluctantly continues his raids on properties owned by Ron Gregory, putting him in danger after failing to let Gregory know what was coming. Nixon continues to suspect Pat Kitson may be the serial killer, and she is fearful when the woman who alibied Simon for the murders goes missing. Her shock is compounded when Kitson collects Abigail from home and brings her to the station. As her mind games persist, Nixon finds the warehouse where Rickman was murdered after a series of texts from Kitson. Meanwhile, Ashton goes out on his stag do, and the boys play a hilarious prank on Boyden instead of the groom to be, but Ashton risks his marriage before it has even begun when he goes back to his hotel with Gilmore.
2	"A Match Made in Hell"	Final appearance of DC Duncan Lennox; Chloe Howman and Edna Doré guest star	Diana Patrick	Steve Hughes	2 January 2003	077
Lennox panics when Nixon calls him from Rickman's murder site, only for the line to disconnect. He launches a search with Hunter, finding her car abandoned, while Taviner discovers a necklace belonging to Rickman at the scene. Lennox discovers Nixon was going after Pat Kitson, rallying the troops to track her down. Gold is in shock after finding Ashton and Gilmore in bed together, while the reception falls through at the last minute, leaving Young devastated. Gilmore opens up, but Ashton still goes to his wedding; however, he shows up with a black eye after detaining a mugger while en route to the church. Meanwhile, Hunter struggles to comprehend Ron Gregory's request to sleep with his wife Cindy, but when she tells him she won't, the pair get a chilling reminder of how far Gregory's reach goes.
3	"Bad Taste"	Sam Aston, Roy Heather and Jessica Harris guest star	Diana Patrick	Kathrine Smith	8 January 2003	078
Glaze resurrects an acquaintance with an old friend, Sister Sarah Donohue, following a near riot outside a church housing recently released paedophile, Frank Keegan. With the community riled, CID get a chance to put him back inside when one of his victims comes forward, having failed to get a conviction in her original trial. Best arrests his sister's boyfriend Neil for driving a cut and shut car, but he suspects Neil may be responsible for the injuries his nephew Ryan has. Carver confronts Klein after catching him using cocaine at Kerry and Luke's wedding, urging him to give up before it gets out of hand, but his depression from Rickman's death only worsens his addiction. However, a sense of relief spreads around the station after news breaks that Pat Kitson has been charged with all six of the River Murders, securing justice for Rickman. Meanwhile, Hunter tries to help his wife Cindy as she reluctantly prepares to spend the night with Ron Gregory.
4	"A Smart Bomb"	Sam Aston and Jessica Harris guest star	Fraser MacDonald	Gerard McKenna	9 January 2003	079
Best is in denial after being told by Neil Roper that his sister Karen is abusing her son Ryan, but he is given a reality check when he shows up at Karen's to find Ryan lying at the bottom of the stairs. Having already shopped his dad for domestic abuse, he is left wondering if he should do the same with his sister. Okaro targets Ron Gregory, unaware that Meadows has assigned Webb to watch him. Hunter fears when Cindy doesn't show after her night at Gregory's, and he is horrified when she is found having been mugged and assaulted. Glaze steps in when Sarah Donohue has a client smash up the community centre where she works. The suspect, David Ackroyd, is determined to be arrested and asks to speak to Okaro when he arrives at custody, revealing they are old friends and colleagues. Ackroyd tells Okaro that Ron Gregory is getting into drug importation; however, Okaro is horrified when Ackroyd is later found murdered.
5	"Method to the Madness"	Jesse Birdsall guest stars	Fraser MacDonald	Henrietta Hardy	15 January 2003	080
Ron Gregory continues to pile the pressure on Hunter, asking him arrest Turkish drug smuggler Erkin Baier. Meadows is sceptical, not only because of Baier's notoriety, but also that he is a major rival of Gregory. Bradford is tasked with a domestic assault that Klein and Buxton attended to in an affluent area, but her mind is off the job as she pushes Gold to arrest users at a needle exchange, while Glaze is keen to help as the exchange is based at Sarah Donohue's community centre. Meanwhile, Okaro implements his new policy of not arresting drug users to target the dealers; however, it divides opinions within the relief.
6	"Controversial Approach"	Stephan Grothgar guest stars	Dominic Lees	Steve Handley	16 January 2003	081
Following Bradford's complaint, a furious Fitzwilliam confronts Okaro and demands he make a public retraction on his policy against arresting drug users. As they head to a press conference, Okaro demands his driver divert to the fatal shooting of a child, and after discovering the boy was caught in the crossfire of a drug dispute, he makes a move that stuns the media and infuriates Fitzwilliam. Bradford awaits the results of her HIV test, but with Kane getting closer to her, will she be honest about it? In the interim, the pair investigate a vicious attack on a school teacher, with a begrudged pupil the prime suspect. Meanwhile, Laura Meadows confronts her husband over an assumption he is cheating on her with McAllister, but when she discovers she has got it wrong, Meadows turns it around and tells her their marriage is over.
7	"Hard Liquor"	Bill Ward and Michael Pennington guest star	Dominic Lees	Carol Williams	22 January 2003	082
Fitzwilliam grills Okaro after his comments to the press about decriminalisation of drugs the day before. She demands he make a public apology before taking him to a disciplinary hearing with the commissioner. He threatens to resign after she stops him leaving a meeting, only to discover he was comforting the mother of the boy shot dead the day before, and this move leads Fitzwilliam to defend Okaro's unconventional methods. Buxton and Best attend a fatal overdose, with the victim a possible suspect in a series of thefts investigated by Sharpe, but Buxton is saddened to discover the girl was one of her childhood friends. Taviner and Glaze have a strong GBH charge thrown out of court, and Taviner suspects the judge may have taken a bribe, but Meadows, a friend of the judge in question, immediately dismisses the claim. Kane tries to push Bradford away after their night of passion.
8	"Cross Transfer"	Angela Pleasence, Bill Ward and Michael Pennington guest star	Baz Taylor	Gerard McKenna	23 January 2003	083
Meadows warns Taviner off his investigation into Judge Howard Sinclair, but his curiosity sees him ask Webb to look into Sinclair. Both Taviner and Webb track down potential victim Barry Kennedy, but Kennedy drunkenly lets Sinclair know when he causes a scene outside the court. When Kennedy names Taviner, Meadows works out the worst possible punishment for him, while Kennedy is subject to a vicious beating. Ackland and Carver investigate Osbourne's suspicions that a man with special needs is assaulting his mother; however, they discover things aren't as straightforward as they thought. Meanwhile, Bradford is keen to get into CID but Kane gets the post, causing Bradford to make a scene and let slip her "HIV status" to the entire CSU office.
9	"Crackdown"	TDC Brandon Kane transfers to CID, PC Des Taviner is seconded to CSU; Michael Pennington and Robert Beck guest star	Baz Taylor	Maxwell Young	29 January 2003	084
Meadows tasks Webb and Kane to continue the investigation into potentially corrupt judge Howard Sinclair. Meadows presses his old friend for info, but he is cagey about his alleged activities. Webb and Kane witness him taking cash from a man about to go on trial, claiming Sinclair will manipulate the trial of criminals for £500, but Meadows is suspicious that Sinclair is being so honest about committing fraud; could there be another reason for his dodgy dealings? Carver pairs with Taviner after his secondment to CSU begins. They investigate a series of domestic assaults against a woman reluctant to talk. Meanwhile, Cryer becomes suspicious of Bradford's alleged HIV status.
10	"Thinking Out Loud"	First appearance of PC Cameron Tait; Ian Burfield guest stars	Christopher King	Philip Gladwin	30 January 2003	085
Hunter is first on scene when a young girl and her father are shot at outside a bank. Ashton stands by with the parents in the hospital as he attempts to get info for CID. Young attends reports of a man walking naked at his flat window, but the upbeat and apologetic Aussie introduces himself as PC Cameron Tait, and tells her that he is starting at Sun Hill the following day. Klein and Cryer attend Simon Kitson's funeral, but the former ends up lashing out at Pat Kitson when she also attends. Bradford is furious when Hunter reacts excessively to her touching him, but as Cryer gets more suspicious over her claims, Bradford acts quickly to keep her credibility. Meanwhile, Drummond continues to get suspicious deposits into his bank account.
11	"Dropout Factory"	Desmond McNamara guest stars	Christopher King	Julie White	4 February 2003	086
Ashton is paired with new arrival Tait on his first day, and they investigate when a teen, Leonard Styles, is found with a heavy bag full of loose change. When it appears he is part of a blackmail scam to force arcades into paying protection, Styles reveals info on John Bower and his runner Davy Swayle, targets of Glaze. Ashton and Tait hold Styles at the station as they host an open day, where he forms an unlikely double act with Sharpe's daughter Joanna. Caught stealing sweets from the canteen, Sharpe reads her daughter the riot act, but she later goes missing. When Leonard is found beaten up in one of the cells, Sharpe fears that Joanna might have gotten in the way of Bower's enforcers Liam and Neil Foster. Elsewhere, Meadows' hopes and dreams are dashed when McAllister arrives at work on the arm of a handsome young man, while Ashton reels from the news that Young is pregnant with their baby.
12	"Without a Trace"	Renu Setna, Anna Wing and Robert Beck guest star	Ged Maguire	Patrick Melanaphy	5 February 2003	087
Gold spearheads the search for Joanna Sharpe following her disappearance at the station's open day. Okaro returns from his course and tasks Nixon with heading up the investigation, making it a high risk missing person inquiry. Ashton's stalker Joe Kincaid joins the search, but as he continues to harass Ashton outside the station, Gilmore spots them, causing him to blurt out to Young that he thinks her husband is gay. Meanwhile, Hollis uncovers a case of incest during the door to door search near the station.
13	"The Cat With Nine Lives"	Final appearance of Sgt Craig Gilmore	Ged Maguire	Gerrard McKenna	6 February 2003	088
Carver is assigned to the Sharpe family as FLO as the search for Joanna goes into the night, and hope of her being found inside the first 24 hours looks increasingly less likely. Sharpe is determined not to let things get to her, but it soon come on top, while Gilmore cracks under pressure and misses a key search area. After Ashton attends a serious assault on a prison officer, Gold assigns an emotional Gilmore to a seemingly low key guard duty, following a shocking discovery about the assault victim, but Gilmore is left subject to a vicious attack by a gang of masked men. When Ashton gets emotional with Gilmore as he lies in hospital bed, Young spots it, and she goes to Gold to demand an answer; Gold tells Ashton and Gilmore it's time to come clean, but will they?
14	"False Pride"	First appearance of Sgt Sheelagh Murphy; Michael Pennington and Kaye Wragg guest star	Brett Fallis	Emma Goodwin	12 February 2003	089
Sharpe returns to work as she determines to find her daughter Joanna, but Meadows and Nixon are insistent she has to kept clear from the investigation into a prison officer suspected of being a paedophile. Meadows is horrified when his old friend Howard Sinclair is implicated, with CID fearing there is a paedophile ring operating in the area, with time at its worse owing to Joanna's disappearance. Gold tells the relief that Gilmore won't be returning after his assault, so Sergeant Sheelagh Murphy is drafted in from another station; however, she hits the ground running instead of getting settled, so Gold encourages her to take the post full time. Meanwhile, Ackland and Taviner investigate a domestic that escalates when it appears the husband may be a suspect for attempted murder, and Ackland is impressed when Taviner alerts her to Carver, who has fallen off the wagon owing to the pressures of being Sharpe's FLO.
15	"Under Pressure"	PC Des Taviner returns to uniform; Jesse Birdsall, Michael Pennington and Cliff Parisi guest star	Brett Fallis	Matthew Leys	13 February 2003	090
Nixon and Meadows are left furious when Sharpe reveals Webb told her about the paedophile ring; however, Meadows has bigger problems when Fitzwilliam arrives, telling Okaro that Meadows has until 4pm to resign on his own terms or risk his career going down in flames. Meadows makes a breakthrough when he finds another victim of Sinclair, and consults Ackland in a bid to save himself. When the mood is lifted by news that Sinclair is guilty, the team are brought back to earth with a bump when the body of a young girl is found. Murphy and Drummond investigate when a pizza deliveryman's moped is stolen, and they discover that his boss is running a sideline in drugs. Meanwhile, after falling off the wagon, Carver heads to AA, then decides to put an end to his relationship with Ackland following his drunken proposal.
16	"The Darkest Hour"	New title sequence and theme introduced; Jesse Birdsall and Michael Pennington guest star	Sylvie Boden	John Milne	26 February 2003	091
Sharpe is left shattered after the discovery of a young girl's body. With the corpse badly burned, there's an agonising wait to find out if the search for Joanna is at a tragic end. CID push on with their paedophile investigation after the arrest of Howard Sinclair; however, he is later found dead at his home after being bailed. Hunter is left to reconsider his alliances when a close friend of Ron Gregory is implicated in the ring, and Meadows is left hoping that they can finally nail Gregory. When the body is revealed not to be Joanna, Sharpe insists on joining the paedophile investigation after suggestions she was sexually assaulted before being killed.
17	"Fraught with Danger"	Jesse Birdsall and Kierston Wareing guest star	Sylvie Boden	Nick Saltrese	27 February 2003	092
It's a day of reckoning for CID when they finally get suspected paedophile Clive Inverdale into court, but they are unprepared for the events that follow when the court is stormed by a masked man with a gun who shoots Inverdale dead. Ron Gregory tricks Hunter into being his alibi, leaving Meadows furious. With Sinclair also out of the picture, the investigation looks to be heading nowhere. Meanwhile, Osbourne and Hollis investigate several cases of stolen masonry, including one where the owner was brutally attacked during the robbery. A search of a derelict building for the stolen goods yields much more than they expected.
18	"Found"	Temporary departure of DC Eva Sharpe; Jesse Birdsall guest stars	Chris Lovett	Sally Garland	5 March 2003	093
Sharpe is relieved that Joanna has been found alive and well, and upon further examination, evidence discovers that her only injuries were from the fall into the man-trap at the abandoned house. When Joanna finally speaks out, she reveals that she wandered off of her own accord and became trapped in the derelict building. The identity of the dead child is finally discovered, and Kane and Nixon put out an all ports warning for the child's adoptive parents, in the hope that they will give up Ron Gregory. Meadows gives Hunter an ultimatum to speed the case up – prove Ron Gregory's guilt or face a DPS enquiry for his relationship with a known criminal. Drummond's son Alex is arrested after discovering his father has a second marriage, causing both wives to tell him things have gone too far. Meanwhile, Bradford is jealous when Kane starts dating a doctor, and decides to pull some very sneaky moves in an attempt to prize the pair apart.
19	"The Nouveau Riche"	Temporary departure of DS Phil Hunter; Jesse Birdsall and Janine Wood guest star	Chris Lovett	Julian Perkins	6 March 2003	094
Meadows has an attack of conscience over whether or not to report Hunter to CIB – so in a last ditch attempt to save face, Hunter promises he will have Gregory sitting in the cells within 24 hours. With Gregory having already admitted he has taken part in paedophilic activities, Hunter tries to gather proof by ordering a burglary on Gregory's flat, executed by none other than Drummond, who is mortified to discover his suspicious bank deposits came from the manipulative DS. Unleashing all his anger over his marital problems, Drummond is left red-faced when he burgles the wrong flat. Gregory invites Hunter round and locks him in the bedroom with a young girl, but when Hunter calls in the cavalry, Gregory manipulates the situation before issuing a stark warning to Hunter. Meanwhile, Drummond is given hope when Murphy persuades his wife Fiona to sit down and chat, so he arranges leave to focus on his first marriage, with his second in tatters.
20	"Classroom Politics"	Daisy Beaumont and Robert Beck guest star	Michael Offer	Patricia Smallacombe	12 March 2003	095
Chaos reins in Canley as uniform attend a mass of calls. Ashton and Buxton attend a fire at a public convenience as Boyden and Tait break up a fight at Harvey Wallace Comprehensive School. They hunt for two girls who were locked in the burning bathrooms, becoming prime suspects for arson after fleeing the scene after their rescue, and they are later arrested while shoplifting. After one of the girls alleges sexual assault, Young is assigned as SOIT officer. Ashton and Buxton then attend a shooting at a gym, but Glaze and Webb struggle to get statements from the witnesses. Boyden and Tait catch Nixon's daughter Abigail truanting, but her friend takes a shine to Boyden and confides that one of her teachers is sleeping with her pupils. When Boyden dismisses the girl's claims and then her advances, she makes a claim that leaves Boyden reeling. Meanwhile, Dr Sandra Malik files an official complaint against Bradford, represented by Ashton's stalker Joe Kincaid. When Young becomes suspicious of Ashton's sexuality once more, she goes to confront Kincaid.
21	"Sleeping Dogs Lie"	Daisy Beaumont and Adam Deacon guest star	Michael Offer	Jason Sutton	13 March 2003	096
As the allegations against school teacher Sonia Graham become public, uniform are called to a series of disturbances at her home. Abigail Nixon joins Boyden on patrol for work experience; however, he is distracted after being accused of sexual abuse by her friend Stephanie the day before. Abi is later assaulted by Stephanie for blowing her allegations against Boyden. Webb and Glaze continue their investigation into the gym shooting, with the boyfriend of witness Tara Wells, Prince Morley, becoming prime suspect. Young continues her determination to get rape victim Louanna Shaw to go to the refuge centre, but when she decides to go ahead with it, the doctors suspect Shaw has been gang raped. In her personal life, Young is torn about having an abortion, after her conversation with Joe Kincaid the day before. When Ashton finds out what she's planning, he races to the clinic, but can he get there in time?
22	"The Philadelphia Lawyer"	Daisy Beaumont and Janet Dibley guest star	Peter Butler	Kathrine Smith	19 March 2003	097
The abuse against suspended school teacher Sonia Graham escalate to the point of death threats, but as an arrest is made, events take a drastic turn. Glaze continues to try recruiting Nathan Morley into informing against his brother for the shooting at the gym. Young tries to get rape victim Louanna Shaw to admit the truth about her attack, with forensics adamant that there was more than one attacker, despite Shaw refuting the claims. Young, after reuniting with Ashton, decides to keep her baby, but tragedy later strikes. Okaro and Nixon are further perplexed by a confession from the teenager identified by Shaw, suspecting the boy is trying to boost his reputation by lying. Meanwhile, Abigail Nixon is asked by her mother to make a statement about her assault the day before, so she decides to get even by turning informant about her friend Stephanie being a dealer. As the sting goes off, Abigail grows closer to Boyden.
23	"Throw for a Loss"	First appearance of PC Honey Harman; Janet Dibley guest stars	Peter Butler	Steve Hughes	20 March 2003	098
CID take over the investigation into Sonia Graham's abuse after she is gunned down in her own home. When forensics confirm the bullets in the shooting are the same as those used in the gym shooting, Nathan Morley becomes prime suspect for the second attack. PC Honey Harman arrives at Sun Hill for her first shift, pairing with a smitten Best. Boyden draws reference to her lack of intelligence, but she proves the doubters wrong when her investigation into a shoplifting with Best sees them track down the gunman in Sonia Graham's shooting, coming soon after Graham dies in hospital. Beth Tyler is subject to a vicious attack as the families of the Bevan Park Crew seek retribution for their arrests. Hollis catches Boyden getting intimate with Abigail Nixon for the second time in 24 hours, so he reports his sergeant to Okaro, with Nixon furious when her daughter refuses to press charges. Meanwhile, Young reels following her miscarriage, with Ashton devastated as she tells him their marriage is over.
24	"The Square Apple"	Return of PC Polly Page; first appearance of Marie Graham; Syan Blake, Pippa Haywood and Tim Dantay guest star	Claire Winyard	Kathrine Smith	26 March 2003	099
Polly Page returns to Sun Hill after her long term leave, being assigned to the vacant position in CSU. She is paired Bradford to investigate a woman's claims she is being stalked by her best friend; however, she is implicated in a vandalism case at a doctor's practice attended by Taviner and Buxton, and he later counter-accuses her of stalking. Elsewhere in CSU, Carver is assigned as FLO to Sonia Graham's mother Marie; however, she is overcome when visiting Sonia's flat. Best goes undercover at Harvey Wallace Comprehensive to track down dealers targeting the pupils, but Abigail Nixon makes an appearance and deliberately blows his cover. With her daughter unwilling to make a complaint about her affair with Boyden, Nixon decides to make life uncomfortable for Boyden, vowing to find an alternative way to get him kicked out of the Met.
25	"Under the Thumb"	DC Danny Glaze transfers to CSU as Acting DS; Liz May Brice, David Yip and Paul Courtenay Hyu guest star	Claire Winyard	Clive Dawson	27 March 2003	100
Boyden is shot at as he and Ashton attend an attempted murder on the Cole Lane Estate, with Nixon begrudgingly paired with Boyden to investigate. When Osbourne and Tait find an abandoned lorry, they suspect it was used for human trafficking, and they later discover the man shot is the owner of the lorry firm. Taviner is frustrated after being posted to the Cole Lane as ward officer, investigating a local youth running riot on the estate. He takes a shine to a local resident who is having problems with her neighbour's music blaring constantly. Glaze is left unhappy when he is assigned to CSU as Okaro decides to make him Acting DS when Ackland goes on holiday. He and Carver are tasked when the woman's neighbour accusing her of "racial discrimination" for asking him to turn his music down, leaving Glaze infuriated. Young prepares Louanna Shaw for her rape trial, but McAllister is frustrated as key witness Beth Tyler begins demanding incentives for testifying. Meanwhile, Carver tries to distance himself as FLO for Marie Graham after ending up in bed with her.
26	"Out of Your Depth"	Jesse Birdsall, Burt Kwouk, Wendy Kweh, Clare Clifford and Adam Deacon guest star	Baz Taylor	Nicholas McInerny	2 April 2003	101
McAllister takes up the investigation into the suspected snakehead gang, with a break in the case coming when Taviner finds a Chinese refugee wandering the Cole Lane Estate. Meadows is sceptical of an interpreter in the case as the refugee is manipulated in interview, but Taviner jeopardises the case after failing to realise the woman is a suspect. Gold is livid when Ashton and Young are caught committing contempt of court in the Louanna Shaw rape trial, forcing the Inspector to step in and try rescuing the case. Meanwhile, Meadows and Webb are delighted when a chance to go back after Ron Gregory miraculously lands in their laps after the criminal's car is stolen.
27	"Juggernaut"	Jesse Birdsall, Burt Kwouk and Wendy Kweh guest star	Baz Taylor	Patrea Smallacombe	3 April 2003	102
Meadows leads an arrest team into Chinatown to detain corrupt interpreter Mai Ann Wey, determined to track down the missing immigrants from the Cole Lane Estate. Webb is horrified at the discovery that Okaro has been meeting with suspected paedophile Peter Mansell, a known associate of Ron Gregory. Webb suspects Okaro is offering his daughter to Gregory, and when he takes his suspicions to Gold, she struggles to work out how it can be related to the job. When Webb blows an operation to arrest Gregory involving Cryer, he has to be released. Cryer joins forces with Webb to privately investigate Gregory, leading to a shock discovery and major break in the case. Meanwhile, Taviner gets closer to Murphy; however, she is quick to remind him she's a married woman.
28	"Week by Week"	Jesse Birdsall guest stars	Baz Taylor	Tom Needham	9 April 2003	103
Webb tries to escape Warren Nappier's house but gets captured by Ron Gregory, causing him to be abducted, along with Cryer and young girl Abeo. Taking them to a remote warehouse, Gregory plans to murder his three hostages; however, Nappier is reluctant to follow through. Back at the station, Meadows gets Webb's voicemail from the night before, so he launches a hunt for Webb, Cryer and Gregory. Meanwhile, Taviner and Osbourne are first on scene of a horror crash in which the driver of a car is impaled by a scaffolding pole after rear ending a builder's pickup truck. Feeling death is certain, the man confesses to murdering his wife ten years earlier. Drummond and McAllister investigate the case, but as they find a body in his old home, it looks like the man may pull through, making his new wife nervous after being implicated. Elsewhere, Carver's attempts to extinguish his budding romance with Marie Graham fails.
29	"Frail"	Eric Sykes guest stars	Dominic Clemence	Matthew Leys	10 April 2003	104
Murphy and Klein investigate a series of robberies on the elderly residents of the Cole Lane Estate, curious as to why the victims are refusing to talk to the police. Klein suggests going to see them in plain clothes, discovering the suspects said they would be watching them to ensure they kept quiet. Osbourne enlists the help of Bradford after a former one night stand shows up at her house saying she's left her husband; however, Young suspects the woman isn't being honest about being domestically abused. Kane is approached by his ex wife Tanya when she says she is receiving threatening letters. As Tanya gets closer to her former husband, she talks to Cryer getting back together with him then goes to see Bradford. As she deludes herself about her so called relationship with Kane, Tanya works out her lies, causing Bradford to lash out with disastrous consequences. Meanwhile, Murphy sees Carver confronting Klein over his cocaine addiction, and she sends him on leave after he confesses to his habit.
30	"Grandstand"	—	Dominic Clemence	Steve Hughes	16 April 2003	105
Bradford panics as Tanya lies at the bottom of a flight of stairs in a car park. Desperate to cover up her attack, she steals the CCTV and torches her car after colliding with another vehicle at the scene. Tait is immediately suspicious of the attack and drafts in McAllister. Drummond is disgusted as she makes Kane the prime suspect, with Bradford forcing her way onto the case to make sure she doesn't come under suspicion. Cryer becomes suspicious of Bradford, however, and as Bradford gets emotional, she almost lets slip her role in Tanya's attack. Tanya's ex Ros makes an appearance at the hospital, and while Bradford and Drummond are suspicious of her, McAllister keeps her sights firmly on Kane. As Bradford manipulates the case, she gets brought back to earth with a bump by news from the hospital.
31	"Disillusion"	Jan Anderson and Alex McSweeney guest star	Ged Maguire	Steve Hughes	17 April 2003	106
After hearing that Tanya might pull through, Bradford works out an escape, but she changes her mind when she discovers that Kane is prime suspect for the attack. DI Will Elvins from MIT arrives to assist McAllister with the case, while Bradford concocts a false alibi for Kane and makes another ludicrous claim. With Kane cleared but Bradford still implicated, she goes after Tanya's ex Ros. As they prove that she sent the hate mail, and with Tanya taking a drastic turn for the worse, Bradford hopes she has all her avenues covered. Ashton and Tait attend a serious assault at a snooker hall, but when an old boyfriend of Harman's is implicated, she clashes with Buxton over claims he racially insulted her. Osbourne arrests a minor celebrity, but ends up on the end of an unfounded allegation as the girl tries to save her reputation. Meanwhile, Ashton is suspicious when an emotional Tait disappears during the shift, but Ashton gets Tait to open up before confiding his own secret.
32	"Rose-Coloured Glasses"	Jan Anderson and Charlotte Salt guest star	Ged Maguire	Emma Goodwin	23 April 2003	107
Osbourne is furious after her official complaint by a shoplifting weather girl. She and Ashton clash as they pursue a teenage tearaway, but they put their personal differences aside when the girl tries to commit suicide twice, Osbourne suspecting the girl is being neglected by her depressed and uninterested father. Nixon tries to clear Osbourne's name by exploiting the one thing that matters to the weather girl; her reputation. Taviner, Tait and Best vie for the affections of a woman who has been burgled, with her estranged husband not only the suspect for her break in, but also a serious assault on an ex-con running an electrical shop. Meanwhile, Klein ends up in debt to his dealer Dexter as his drug addiction spirals, but he bonds with Dexter's girlfriend, unaware she is none other than Boyden's daughter Amy.
33	"Come Home to Roost"	Guest appearance of Bob Cryer; Trevor Byfield guest stars	Robert Del Maestro	Emma Goodwin	24 April 2003	108
Nixon and Gold attend the funeral of local crime boss Liam Lyons. They are forced to call on retired Sergeant Bob Cryer when his son Peter has his daughter abducted, with Peter the outcast having been an informant for Cryer during his days at Sun Hill. Nixon and Gold both disapprove of his old school methods, but he uncovers a link to the rumoured murder of Peter's wife Ellie. Osbourne recovers in hospital following her brutal assault the night before, but despite being cleared of her sexual assault allegations, she considers resigning owing to her two recent setbacks. Klein continues to bond with Amy Boyden, and she introduces him to crack cocaine; however, he is almost caught when uniform coordinate a raid on the crack house. Despite avoiding one nightmare, he ends up in the middle of another when Amy's daughter ingests crack and overdoses.
34	"Surprise Surprise"	Stuart Organ guest stars	Robert Del Maestro	Maxwell Young	29 April 2003	109
Boyden is horrified to discover his granddaughter Sophie is in hospital after ingesting crack cocaine. Boyden tracks down Amy to warn her off, stating he is applying for custody. Best confronts Klein over his involvement, while both are furious when they have items stolen from the locker room. Tait comes under suspicion when his phone is mixed up with Glaze's, but the relief are unaware that Klein is stealing from them to fund his crack habit. Nixon is horrified to discover her daughter's determination to find out who her father is has driven her to take an overdose, but she is left unaware that before her overdose that she went to Boyden to look into a man from her mother's university days. Back at the office, Nixon investigates the GBH of a teenager who was caught trying to deface a war memorial, and the suspect is furious to discover it has been vandalised while he was in custody.
35	"Played Like a Fiddle"	Temporary departure of PC Nick Klein; Stephen North guest stars	Dermot Boyd	Tom Needham	30 April 2003	110
Okaro and Gold mount an OBBO on the male locker rooms after a series of thefts. When they spot Best and Carver breaking into Klein's locker, they state they think he is on crack. Carver stages a sting by telling Klein that Marie Graham's house will be empty for a few hours, and as expected, Carver and Best catch Klein burgling the house. However, he evades capture as he desperately tries to get a fix, and Carver determines to save Klein from himself. Nixon and Drummond pair up to investigate an aggravated burglary, horrified that their adopted son might have robbed his adoptive father for his biological father. When he is found atop a high rise building, Boyden's methods backfire and the boy commits suicide, leaving Boyden to face outrage from the boy's family and an official enquiry. At the end of a frustrating day, Boyden's journalist friend tells him all about Abigail Nixon's father, and he is stunned to discover exactly what Nixon doesn't want her daughter to know.
36	"Moving Target"	Final appearance of Sgt Matthew Boyden; Colin Spaull, Stuart Organ and Tim Dantay guest star	Dermot Boyd	Tom Needham	1 May 2003	111
Boyden drops a bombshell on Nixon, armed with the information on Abigail's father. He threatens to tell Abi before the end of the day if she doesn't, but Nixon gets her own back by riling up Michael Whittington, who persists with his allegation that Boyden told his brother Dean to jump off a rooftop. His day gets worse when daughter Amy is arrested yet again, this time for threatening Tait with a needle. Nixon is forced to investigate Richard Thornton, a man who helped her on a recent case, for threatening behaviour after allegations he threatened someone with a gun. Nixon and Boyden later discover a car owned by Lenny Kapoor, a man who witnessed a murder that Boyden attended a few weeks earlier, submerged in the River Thames. When Lenny is found dead, Nixon desperately calls Boyden to get him off the streets, but his refusal to listen to his rival leaves him in severe danger.
37	"Laid to Rest"	Guest appearance of Bob Cryer; Stefan Dennis guest stars	Christopher King	John Milne	7 May 2003	112
The relief prepare for Boyden's funeral, with Bob Cryer coming back to see his old friend laid to rest, while Rickman's mother makes a surprise appearance. Tait goes undercover to nail a shoplifting ring; however, it is almost blown when Cryer spots him stealing from a department store. Glaze finds informant Nathan Morley impaled by an ornamental spear in his flat, but Nixon is fearful when she realises his brother Prince is due to be in court for his attempted murder charge. Webb and Kane attend court, and witness Prince being broken out of his prison transport van, leaving Kane looking down the barrel of a gun. Best is left red faced when he unknowingly lets Prince evade capture. Meanwhile, Marie Graham asks Carver to help her warn a tearaway off her son, and she later leaves Carver stunned when she admits her true feelings for him.
38	"Turning Back the Clock"	Return of DS Phil Hunter, A/DS Danny Glaze returns to DC	Christopher King	Matthew Leys	15 May 2003	113
Hunter returns to work to help Webb and Kane track down Prince Morley, but his main associate is shot dead while they conduct surveillance. Glaze tries to get his brother Nathan to help, but after initially rejecting Glaze's help, Nathan offers up a potential location for Prince, only to be abducted by his brother's gang. Best is made a laughing stock after news of him letting Prince escape court becomes public. He gets a second blow when he convinces Stamp not to arrest Mel Grant for her campaign of harassment against Marie Graham, only to catch them arguing later on. Carver reels after Marie's proposal, but while they drift apart, Harman tries to convince Carver to reconcile with Marie while they investigate an assault. The only remaining complication for Carver is the return of Ackland, who has decided while on holiday that she wants to resume their relationship.
39	"Charlie Foxtrot (Part 1)"	Return of DC Eva Sharpe; David Spinx and Brana Bajic guest star	Diana Patrick	Katherine Smith	20 May 2003	114
Sharpe throws herself into work after her time off with daughter Joanna, pairing with Hunter when a city lawyer is assaulted outside a nightclub. He alleges a female colleague is responsible, but when she gives a statement, they discover she is a victim of workplace discrimination. Osbourne also returns to work after her assault, but she immediately gets on the wrong side of Gold when she takes a risk as immigration try to detain an illegal immigrant from inside a woman's refuge. Ackland's own return from her holiday sees her focusing less on the job, determined to see Carver and reignite their relationship, unaware that he has gotten engaged to Marie Graham. Meanwhile, Stamp continues to bond with Rickman's mother Lillian.
40	"Charlie Foxtrot (Part 2)"	Final appearance of PC Gemma Osbourne; Brana Bajic guest stars	Diana Patrick	Katherine Smith	21 May 2003	115
Osbourne puts her career on the line as she fights her conscience over the impending deportation of Iranian immigrant Ziba and her daughter Niki. As the leader of the refuge where Ziba has hidden gets under Osbourne's skin, she makes the decision to let her escape. Gold demands she resign, but she defiantly refuses to. However, Taviner and Young later arrive at Osbourne's flat to find her being loaded into an ambulance, suspecting there were complications from her assault a few weeks earlier. Hunter and Sharpe are puzzled when solicitor Robert Fenn withdraws his assault complaint against colleague Kim Bradbury, but then they discover Kim has resigned. Sharpe confesses she visited the seedy bar where Robert and his friends hang out, and she convinces Hunter that they're dealing drugs, so Tait goes undercover.
41	"Boomerang (Part 1)"	John Cater and Kellie Shirley guest star	Jim O'Hanlon	John Milne	22 May 2003	116
Gold assigns Stamp and Hollis to a series of assaults on homeless people. Events take a drastic turn when a social worker is seriously assaulted with a knife, leaving Stamp to question his judgement after clashing with the woman prior to the attack. Murphy's husband Patrick is assaulted and has his cab stolen while on shift, but when his cab is identified as the one in the attack on the social worker and he can't provide an alibi for the time of the woman's attack, McAllister arrests him. Ashton and Taviner deal with several calls to a pair of feuding elderly men feuding over a set of lost books. Meanwhile, Stamp is awkward with Ackland after their drunken encounter at Carver's engagement party.
42	"Boomerang (Part 2)"	Return of Dale Smith as Sgt; Kellie Shirley guest stars	Jim O'Hanlon	John Milne	29 May 2003	117
Ashton attends the scene of a serious car crash where a poorly loaded low loader has been hit by a car, leaving the vehicles stacked on the truck's bed unstable, so he plans a daring rescue. His backup arrives and he gets a blast from the past; Dale Smith, who is back at Sun Hill as the new sergeant. It doesn't take long for old tensions to boil to the surface, and he quickly ditches his partner to pair with Young. They investigate a club where the car is registered to, as the driver fled and left a suspected rent boy in the passenger seat, and Smithy believes the club owner is running rent boys. Murphy's husband Patrick continues to languish in a cell after the Irish Garda confirm he has a criminal record for violence, so she pairs with Taviner to prove his innocence, and Murphy slaps McAllister as she suspects the malicious DS is enjoying the investigation. The case takes a drastic turn when another victim is found; however, this time the victim has been killed, so Stamp determines to get one of the homeless people to testify. One of Taviner's informants points him in the direction of Patrick's cab, but Murphy is left in danger as the suspect ambushes her.
43	"A Growing Concern"	Steven Webb guest stars	Jim Shields	Patrick Melanaphy	4 June 2003	118
A horrified Taviner chases after Murphy after she is abducted by the prime suspect for a series of assaults and a murder. Murphy manages to escape, but just as the suspect catches up to her, Taviner comes to her rescue. Smithy continues his investigation into a possible rent boy ring operating out of a local gay club, sending Tait in undercover to locate a brothel. After securing info for a raid, Smith is stunned to see Ashton enter the club with another man. While the raid the following morning is successful, Smithy has to use one of the rent boys to catch the ringleader; however, Smithy is forced to eat humble pie after realising he has been targeting the wrong man. Marie is arrested for assaulting a boy who vandalised her daughter's grave, but it's Carver who is at risk of missing the ceremony when a scared boy locks him and Page in a basement on a sudden death call, leading Stamp and Ackland to try to track them down.
44	"Rescue"	First appearance of DC Juliet Becker; uncredited cameo appearance of Gabriel Kent	Jim Shields	Steve Hughes	5 June 2003	119
Carver, Ackland, Stamp and Page find themselves trapped in a cellar, and with Carver's wedding to Marie only hours away, tempers start to fray amongst the group as old tensions boil to the surface. A leather-clad biker who turns up at the station turns out to be the new detective constable, Juliet Becker, who is paired with Webb when Best realises that half the relief have disappeared. As they discover the location where the missing group are, it's a race against time when a gas leak threatens the trapped officers. Meanwhile, Ashton and Smith investigate a theft at a cafe, and Ashton is left terrified when Smithy confronts him after discovering his sexuality.
45	"Security Risk"	Ralph Ineson, Trevor Martin and Tim Dantay guest star	Fraser McDonald	Chris Fewtrell	11 June 2003	120
Drummond begins moonlighting as a security guard begins to pay off his debts, but it catches up with him when an angry Meadows finds him asleep at his desk. However, Hunter soon realises that he be able use his position to as an advantage when Drummond's boss, Alan Trent, moves into the ward office previously occupied by Taviner. Allegations of racial prejudice soon emerge, but when Bradford is sent to the Cole Lane Estate to investigate, she decides to turn a blind eye to the evidence. McAllister and Becker are paired when a young mother and her son are run off the road. When the woman's father is found badly beaten, Becker suspects there's more to the case than first appears.
46	"Underground Railroad"	Final appearance of Ch Supt Jane Fitzwilliam; Ralph Ineson guest stars	Fraser McDonald	Steve Hughes	12 June 2003	121
Meadows and Okaro both suspend Drummond when Hunter tells them about his moonlighting, but they decide to use Drummond to gather the evidence they need on Alan Trent. After quitting the day before, Drummond manages to convince Trent to rehire him, posing as a corrupt police officer. After a chance meeting, Trent charms McAllister into a dinner date, which he uses to question her about her supposedly corrupt colleague. Concerned with Trent moving in on the estate, Okaro and Meadows organise a residents' meeting on the Jasmine Allen; however, it is interrupted by three armed men in masks. McAllister and Becker continue their investigation into an assault on local businessman Cliff Holland, but while they think it boils down to a feud over a land sale, they soon discover that Holland has an ulterior motive for not selling the land. Meanwhile, Ashton is convinced he is being handed all of the cases with gay victims after being outed to the relief by Young.
47	"Written in the Stars"	Final appearance of PC Luke Ashton; Ralph Ineson and Tim Dantay guest star	Sylvie Boden	Emma Goodwin	18 June 2003	122
Sun Hill comes under fire from a gun epidemic owing to the illegal firearms being produced on the Cole Lane Estate, and Okaro is convinced that Trent is the cause. As he and Meadows investigate Trent's activities, Drummond comes across an arms cache. McAllister finds solace in her boyfriend Michael, surprised at how much interest he is showing in her. However, the investigation throws up some interesting facts, and McAllister puts her life at risk after making the alarming discovery about who her boyfriend really is. Tait warns Young not to taunt Ashton over her fling with Smith, but it comes too late when Ashton stares down an armed robber without interest of his own safety. Young reveals to Tait she still loves Ashton, but will she have the chance to tell him, or will his recklessness lead to tragedy? Meanwhile, Page is torn when her flatmate and terminally ill friend Dr Owen Preston tells her he is intent on ending his life.
48	"High Speed Chaos"	Doreen Mantle and Tim Dantay guest star	Sylvie Boden	Henrietta Hardy	19 June 2003	123
Hollis reprimands three youths who are seen harassing a bus driver, but the situation takes a dangerous turn when one of the youths pulls out a gun, and they hijack the bus with Hollis, the driver and a busload of terrified passengers. When Hollis realises that the gun is one of the replicas from the Cole Lane estate, it backfires and hits the driver. Best and Harman spot the runaway bus and end up in pursuit, but their moment of glory is lost when Taviner and Murphy take over the pursuit in the Area Car. Dr Owen Preston is arrested for assaulting his deceased wife's killer, but Page's thoughts of helping him clear his name are clouded by his comments the day before on committing suicide. Meanwhile, Harman and Tait investigate a green-thumbed resident at a retirement home, whose plants are not exactly of the legal variety.
49	"Count Me Out"	First appearance of DC Ramani DeCosta	Brett Fallis	Nicholas McInerny	25 June 2003	124
Page is left reeling following the death of Dr Owen Preston. Bradford is there for her when she calls for help, but Bradford's advice leaves Page pondering whether or not she should tell the truth. As she writes up her statement, a bombshell lands on her desk; Owen has left her £150,000 in his will. With Page on light duties, Ackland tasks new sexual offences expert Ramani DeCosta with investigating a rape allegation. DeCosta finds she has very little to go on, but keeps a firm head and attempts to build her own leads. An armed robbery goes off at a building society, with Taviner and Tait used as target practice during the pursuit of the getaway car. When Nixon arrives to investigate she is ambushed by a journalist, an old friend of Boyden, who threatens to reveal all on Abigail's father.
50	"Out in the Open"	Shane Zaza and Stephanie Leonidas guest star	Brett Fallis	Patrick Melanaphy	26 June 2003	125
Nixon is mortified to discover a journalist knows her daughter Abigail's father is a convicted child killer. Her determination to tell Abigail the truth distracts her from the robbery investigation, causing Hunter to go lone ranger. Abigail suspects something is going on and tracks down Dougie Pritchard, and Nixon is horrified when Pritchard sets up a reunion. Hunter's maverick methods in the absence of Nixon sees him pressure a security guard, suspected of being a mole for the robbers, to commit suicide. Meanwhile, Glaze returns from leave and pairs with DeCosta as she and Bradford continue their investigation into a sexual assault at a local college. When a local barman, the prime suspect, is assaulted by another student, they suspect he has been drugging girls from the college, but they are shocked to discover someone close to the latest victim might be an accomplice.
51	"Home Run (Part 1)"	First regular appearance of PC Gabriel Kent	Christopher King	Maxwell Young	2 July 2003	126
Nixon is determined to keep Abigail away when her father, Glen Weston, arrives at Sun Hill. Revealing all to her daughter, Nixon takes her mind off the job to keep Weston away from Abigail, so Hunter goes over her head to Meadows to put surveillance on Sid Wright, a friend and colleague of the now deceased inside man for the robbers. Hunter persuades Meadows to send Drummond undercover at the Metropolitan Police warehouse, suspecting Wright and his in-laws, notorious crime family the Fosters, are targeting a group of high end sports cars that have been seized. Probationary PC Gabriel Kent arrives and pairs with Stamp, but he immediately rubs Stamp up the wrong way. Meanwhile, Taviner has a heart to heart with Murphy about his feelings for her.
52	"Home Run (Part 2)"	Donald Sumpter and James Barriscale guest star	Christopher King	Maxwell Young	3 July 2003	127
Drummond's attempts to gain the confidence of Sid Wright are getting nowhere, so he literally plays his last hand when he follows Wright and gate-crashes a private poker game between Wright and the Fosters. As Drummond gets friendly with Archie Foster, he thinks he's in the best position possible, but the case is compromised when Sid Wright is found in his crashed car, with Hollis suspecting the brakes have been tampered. Hunter warns Drummond to stay alert, but he soon finds himself ambushed and abducted. Meanwhile, a drunken brawl outside a pub turns nasty when Murphy finds a boy beaten badly on the street. Feeling guilty at having let the suspects off with a warning earlier, Murphy tackles the case on her own rather than handing it over to CID. Nixon reluctantly organises a meeting between her daughter Abi and her father.
53	"A Man of Few Words"	Donald Sumpter, James Barriscale and Paul Opacic guest star	Robert Del Maestro	Phillip Gladwin	9 July 2003	128
Drummond's cover as a security guard is blown and Archie Foster blackmails him into helping them raid the Met warehouse, in order to steal millions of pounds worth of luxury sports cars – and as an incentive, he threatens Drummond's family. Drummond's absence at the station goes unnoticed at first, as uniform are kept busy by a series of bomb hoaxes organised by Foster. With the raid underway, Foster's plans begin to unravel, and Drummond has to put off a curious McAllister and Becker who turn up looking for him. An internal rivalry leads to Vince Foster gunning down two accomplices, but when McAllister and Becker find the bodies, Drummond missing and the cars stolen, they are unaware the chaos has only just begun.
54	"In High Demand"	James Barriscale guest stars	Robert Del Maestro	Tom Higgins	10 July 2003	129
Meadows arrives at the Met warehouse after the robbery, while Nixon arrives at the ambush site with Drummond wounded and Archie Foster dead. As Drummond is rushed to hospital, Okaro hauls Nixon over the coals and sends her on leave owing to the fiasco around her daughter Abigail's father being identified. Drummond panics when he awakens in hospital to a threatening note from Vince Foster, while his estranged wife Fiona is mortified to discover he was talking to her as Drummond was admitted to hospital. Meanwhile, Young and Smith break up a fight between two former friends, and when one of the girls turns up seriously assaulted, Young uncovers a potential ring of underage prostitution.
55	"Bully"	James Barriscale guest stars	Emma Williams	Simon J. Ashford	16 July 2003	130
Drummond escapes from hospital to find his son Alex, recruiting Best to assist his search. Vince Foster calls him, and informs him that the only way he will ever see his son again is if he delivers him Sid Wright on a plate. Meanwhile, Taviner and Murphy attend to a disturbance at a local brothel, but their own personal feelings for each other begin to get in the way of their work. Hunter, after being confronted by a furious Drummond, makes it his personal mission to rescue Alex to make amends. Page attends Dr Owen Preston's funeral, but during her speech, nearly blurts out that she was present when Owen committed suicide, until an audacious Bradford manages to step in and save her.
56	"Two Hours"	James Barriscale guest stars	Emma Williams	Tom Needham	17 July 2003	131
Despite delivering the goods as planned, Vince Foster demands that Drummond finds the men who murdered his father – and his missing cargo of stolen cars – in return for his son's safety. With little information to go on, Smithy goes undercover as a prisoner to find out exactly where the stolen cars are being hidden. When Taviner and Murphy begin the search for a missing prostitute, they uncover an underage prostitution ring run by a known pimp, who was interviewed by Young the previous day. An intrigued Hollis tries to find out the identity of the new woman in Taviner's life. Murphy feels she's been taken for a fool when Hollis tells her that Taviner has told him about his relationship.
57	"Ruthless"	Matilda Ziegler and Jo Stone-Fewings guest star	Peter Butler	Chris Fewtrell	23 July 2003	132
Gold and Okaro decide to mount an obbo to catch pimp John Rutherford in the act, which means sending Best undercover at King's Cross Station. He rescues a young girl, Lorna, from a mugger, and the two start to get on well. When they are approached by Rutherford, he suggests they stay at a squat he knows. Best is suspicious, but doesn't want to leave Lorna in Rutherford's clutches. However, when the support team lose sight of him, Best finds he is in way over his head. At the squat, he is drugged, and wakes up with no memory of the previous night when Taviner and Hollis raid the house. Meanwhile, Ackland and Bradford investigate a domestic violence case involving a husband and wife, but the return of Carver from his honeymoon clouds Ackland's judgement.
58	"Under Fire"	Return of PC Nick Klein; Matilda Ziegler and Jo Stone-Fewings guest stars	Peter Butler	Patrea Smallacombe	24 July 2003	133
Ackland finds she is becoming too personally involved with the domestic violence case when she tries to protect victim Monica Skinner from her husband Sean by forcing her to testify against him. When Monica and her boyfriend are found attacked, suspicion immediately falls on Sean, but Carver isn't too sure; however, Ackland's personal grievances with Carver leads her to discourage his theory. Buxton finds herself having to lie in her statement when she naively purchases cheap electrical goods from an old friend, later to discover they are stolen. A drug dealer is brought in for questioning and offers to provide information on Klein in return for a deal, leading Okaro to visit him in rehab. Meanwhile, Murphy tries to distance herself from Taviner, but they have a near miss when her husband shows up at the station to meet her.
59	"Professional Image"	Mollie Sugden, Ron Moody and Jo Stone-Fewings guest star	David Holroyd	John Milne	30 July 2003	134
Ackland is mortified when she discovers domestic violence victim Monica Skinner hanged inside her own home. She faces a grilling for taking her home to get evidence in the assault against her boyfriend Dominic Berry, while her husband Sean takes no time at all to stir the pot and demand Ackland's dismissal. As Ackland feels she is losing the respect of CSU, she makes a big decision. Tait finds the boss of his ex-girlfriend Kim tied up in his home, with the keys to his business stolen, but is mortified to discover Kim's boyfriend Mark Davies is implicated in the case. Smith and Stamp are given the runaround by an elderly couple who have had their car stolen, with Hollis discovering they have a tendency for making hoax emergency calls. Meanwhile, Okaro hauls Murphy and Taviner over the coals after catching them in a passionate clinch the day before.
60	"Sunday Driver"	Sgt June Ackland returns to uniform; Felix Dexter guest stars	David Holroyd	Katherine Smith	31 July 2003	135
On her first day back in uniform, Ackland finds a man brutally stabbed in the house of prominent CPS prosecutor Carl Harris. After arresting Harris for GBH, Ackland discovers that he and Okaro have some previous history – Harris threw out an assault case that Okaro had worked on. Harris's daughter Natasha stays quiet, and it is clear she knows more than she is letting on. When Ackland convinces Natasha to reveal the truth, she reveals that the victim is her biological father, and that he has been blackmailing Harris. Meanwhile, Mark Davies ends up in hospital following a mysterious assault, and when Best and Tait find his daughter Emily on her own at home, Tait takes drastic action.
61	"A Head on the Block"	Lysette Anthony guest stars	Ken Grieve	Simon McCleave	6 August 2003	136
Tait plans to return to Australia after abducting his daughter Emily. Best and Stamp persuade his ex Kim and her boyfriend Mark not to report him for abduction, and, after tracking him down, convincing their colleague the best thing he can do is return Emily. But when Kim tells him she’ll stop his access, Tait decides to hand in his resignation. Events take a drastic turn when Mark is killed in a hit and run, leaving Kim to ask Tait for help in getting loan shark Len McKay off her back, suspecting McKay may be responsible for Mark's murder. Meanwhile, Webb and Becker investigate when a burglar is found at the bottom of a flight of stairs in a house he has broken into. When the homeowner, police widow Rachel Heath, complains about Webb's methods, Meadows takes over the investigation and immediately bonds with her. However, he and Becker are forced to work out who is responsible when Rachel and her son Jamie both confess to the assault.
62	"Pick Your Friends"	DC Ramani DeCosta is promoted to DS; Linda Robson and Lysette Anthony guest star	Ken Grieve	Tom Needham	7 August 2003	137
Ackland and Stamp pursue a man and woman who have been robbing the elderly. Events take a tragic turn when a victim chasing the thief is hit by a car, and she later dies in hospital, with Ackland saddened when she discovers exactly who the woman was. Page is frustrated when a cousin she despises asks for help tracking down a stalker, but she is unwilling to open up, so Bradford takes the case on. Page and her cousin continue to clash, but she is brought back to earth when her stalker shows up. Meadows continues to try to help Rachel Heath, but the teenage burglar she assaulted is insistent on pressing charges. Meanwhile, Hunter is furious to discover the woman Cindy suspects him of cheating with is actually in a relationship with Becker, so he enlists her help to get Cindy back on side.
63	"Cheating"	Lysette Anthony and Dan Fredenburgh guest star	Fraser McDonald	Matthew Leys	13 August 2003	138
Webb returns to work the day after his mother's death and sets about finding the person who was driving the car in the hit and run. While canvassing for witnesses, Harman and Best detain a woman for dangerous driving, finding drugs in the woman's bag. Meadows tries to put Webb on the investigation into the drugs with Becker, but he goes off to find a drunk driver in the case, only to discover the suspect is someone unexpected. Harman is mortified when her fiancé Steven Fletcher is arrested for an assault; however, Hunter and Sharpe are sceptical over getting a conviction, as the incident occurred during a football match, but that doesn't stop Harman stealing a videotape of the incident to avoid her and Fletch being sued for their home. Becker's drug investigation leads to a sting, but Webb's persistence on getting a supplier following her dealer's arrest leads to their informant being put at risk. Smith and Gold bond while investigating the death of Webb's mother, leading to a post-shift drinking session.
64	"A New Lease of Life"	David Legeno and Dan Fredenburgh guest star	Fraser McDonald	Matthew Leys	14 August 2003	139
Webb determines to track down informant Anna Dunbar following her abduction at the hands of her drugs supplier the night before. Gold is involved in an RTC en route to work, but she is found to be over the limit. Smith, aware that his meddling in their drinking contest the night before is the reason why she is over the limit, uses Best to manipulate the test. Gold is furious to discover Smith's meddling in both the drinking contest and her test results, but she puts her frustrations aside after discovering the man who caused her crash is riling other drivers. Becker is horrified when her ex-lover Heather Rayner reports she's been raped by her husband Gavin, but while Becker does her utmost to help Heather through the ordeal, she is unaware she is next on Gavin's list. Meanwhile, Sharpe tries to get Harman to return the stolen tape of her fiancé's alleged GBH in a football game, but Hunter tries a more devious approach.
65	"Silver to Grey"	Lysette Anthony and Bill Thomas guest star	Crispin Reece	Maxwell Young	20 August 2003	140
Becker wakes up to a nightmare after being abducted by Gavin Rayner, determined to get revenge for her affair with his wife Heather. After being taken to an empty house, which is under construction, Becker suspects that Gavin's motives may involve the same treatment, which he gave to his wife. McAllister manages to track down her missing colleague, and the pair manage to overpower him and take him into custody. Meanwhile, Smithy and Young are in pursuit of a schizophrenic teenager who has smashed up his old school and a supermarket, but when he runs straight into the path of McAllister's oncoming car, Gavin makes good his escape in the chaos. Tracked down at a warehouse, Gavin engages in a struggle with Becker and McAllister, falling to his death. With McAllister forcing Gavin out of Becker's grip to stop him dragging her down, will Becker bail out her sergeant, or admit to her part in a deliberate death in custody?
66	"Step up to the Plate"	Lysette Anthony guest stars	Crispin Reece	Clive Coleman	21 August 2003	141
Taviner and Young end up pursuing a speeding car after responding to a burglary call, and discover that the car has been stolen by the masked driver. Taviner matches the MO to a number of similar cases in the area, and decides to challenge a group of young joyriders who seem to be giving him the runaround. When the leader of the gang turns up at the station and gives false information to Smithy, Taviner arrives at the suspect's reported location to find himself in the middle of an ambush. He pushes Smithy to set up an OBBO, but when he refuses, he goes over his head to Gold to get the OBBO authorised. During the OBBO, Young and Smith's recent feud jeopardises the sting, while Taviner gets a double shock. Meanwhile, Buxton and Kent are in court amid allegations of falsifying evidence in a theft case against an old friend of Buxton’s, but she is torn over her loyalties and whether or not she should commit perjury to bail Kent out.
67	"Centre of Attraction"	Lysette Anthony guest stars	Jim O'Hanlon	Sue Mooney	27 August 2003	142
Taviner races to save his skin as a boy racer makes off with the Area Car. When the car evades their clutches, Taviner decides to cover up the fact that Smithy and Young's sexual liaison blew the OBBO. Following an extensive search, Taviner finds the car atop a local multi-storey, having been covered in graffiti. Taviner uses a message received on the gang leader's mobile phone to set up a second operation. He borrows a 'stinger' from traffic and lies in wait at the location of the next joyride, but while Smith and Young decide to leave, he waits out in the hope he’ll be proven right. Webb catches Meadows at Rachel Heath's house, although he shifts focus to talk of a drug deal by local kingpin Scott Lewis, but the young DC makes a shocking move when Meadows throws him off the case. Ackland attends a domestic assault at Scott's sister in law's home, with Ackland knowing Julie Lewis from her days in CSU. When Ackland discovers Julie's husband Eddie will be attending the deal, she convinces Julie to turn informant, but is left regretting it when tragedy strikes as SO19 conduct their raid. Meanwhile, fed up with Kent's meddling, Buxton hands in her resignation; however, she is unable to explain it to Gold when a major incident occurs.
68	"Bold as Brass"	Final appearance of PC Ruby Buxton; TDC Brandon Kane is promoted to DC; Lisa Riley and Lysette Anthony guest star	Jim O'Hanlon	Patrea Smallacombe	28 August 2003	143
Meadows is furious when he finds Webb attacking Rachel Heath in her home. He tries to arrest his protégé, but she persuades him otherwise, telling him their relationship will be exposed if Webb's arrest is made public. Uniform spring into action when a bomb threat is made against a local cinema. The theatres are evacuated, but during a sweep, the device is found and explodes, critically injuring Harman. Kent continues his quest to stop Buxton resigning and exposing his perjury, but she shifts her focus to the job and makes a major breakthrough in the bombing case. Meanwhile, Page continues to get closer to Max Wyatt, but Bradford lets slip that Page is being investigated for Dr Owen Preston's death.
69	"Power Trip"	Ruth Gemmell guest stars	Diana Patrick	Graham Mitchell	2 September 2003	144
Klein returns to work after his stint in rehab, pairing with Best. Despite being the one who reported Klein's addiction to Okaro, Best is surprised to discover Klein is grateful, not resentful. They attend a suspected burglary in a flat slated for redevelopment, but the lease holder says property developer Charles Vanderbilt is responsible, as they are reluctant to move out so Vanderbilt can build new flats on the land. As the flat is trashed a second time, Klein discovers the woman is holding out for more money, just before events take a drastic turn. Nixon investigates after a burglary at the home of Laura Meadows. She is reluctant to admit it, but later reveals she has been using a dating agency; when Nixon links it to another recent burglary, she recruits several female officers to pose as "lonely hearts" and ensnare the suspect.
70	"Ride the Tiger"	Ruth Gemmell and Caroline Lee-Johnson guest star	Diana Patrick	Henrietta Hardy	3 September 2003	145
Okaro continues his investigation into corrupt property developer Charles Vanderbilt after the death of a sitting tenant in an arson attack the day before. McAllister, Klein and Tait go undercover at the home of one of his victims to see if his intimidation continues. The trio are put in danger when a grenade is thrown into the flat, but despite Klein's heroics, Vanderbilt remains elusive as ever. Glaze attends a suspected racially motivated assault, but when he discovers the man's wife is a local councillor, Okaro presses Glaze to find out if there's a link to Vanderbilt. Ackland goes undercover to catch the personal ads burglar; however, she blows the operation after pushing the target away. Kent and Stamp attend when a young boy is found overdosed in an alleyway, and when his brother is arrested, he collapses in custody. Meanwhile, Sharpe's recent marital problems lead her to the bed of a man she bonds with at a resident's meeting.
71	"The Law of the Jungle"	Ruth Gemmell and Caroline Lee-Johnson guest star	Neil Adams	Nicholas McInerny	4 September 2003	146
Nixon arrives at a disused nightclub, with Vanderbilt's right hand man Jim Conrad unconscious after being knocked out by Klein's ASP. Hunter pressures Tait to back up Klein's claims that Conrad was wielding a scaffold pole, with the knife he was actually wielding nowhere to be seen. Okaro asks Glaze to push the councillor suspected of being pressured by Vanderbilt to push through his corrupt deals, but a new enquiry gives them a golden chance to nail Vanderbilt once and for all. McAllister joins Sharpe on the investigation into an overdose by a pair of brothers, with the younger of the two dying in hospital. Sharpe is horrified when the dealer is named as her new beau Tyler, with McAllister furious that the investigation could be blown as a result. Meanwhile, Gold blasts Ackland for blowing the personal ads burglary OBBO, but she persuades Gold to give her another chance.
72	"Truth"	First appearance of DC Terry Perkins; Ian Puleston-Davies guest stars	Neil Adams	Nicholas McInerny	10 September 2003	147
Ackland accompanies Laura Meadows to Barton Street after the DCI's ex-wife reports she has been raped. Webb continues the investigation into the personal ad burglaries when the OBBO flat is robbed, but the video captures identify the prime suspect. DC Terry Perkins, investigating Laura's attack, attends Sun Hill to assist Webb; when Webb discovers Perkins is investigating a rape and that Laura is the victim, he lets it slip to Meadows, who blasts his former protégé for interfering in his personal life. Klein and Best investigate a series of robberies involving a stun gun; however, he has to ask Tait for help, who is still frustrated over the cover-up of Jim Conrad's assault. Harman throws Best a surprise 21st birthday party, but drops a big clanger when she invites his recently released father, unaware of the fact that Best was the person who sent his father to prison; however, the biggest shock of the party sees a member of the relief arrested on major charges.
73	"A Close Shave"	FDO Roberta Cryer becomes a CAD officer	Christopher King	Katherine Smith	11 September 2003	148
Page languishes in a cell after being arrested for Dr Owen Preston's murder. Against the advice of her solicitor, she decides to confess to euthanasia, but DCI Ross decides to push on the evidence for a murder charge. Cryer begins working in CAD, but when she catches Bradford neglecting a victim of domestic violence, she demands Bradford resign. DeCosta begins to doubt Bradford and takes over the case, using the woman's son to ensnare her abusive husband. As Cryer backs Bradford into a corner, she takes drastic action, leaving Cryer's career at risk. Best regrets rejecting a pity advance from Harman, but she continues to try to apologise for inviting his father to his birthday party.
74	"Beware the Smiling Knife"	Final regular appearance of CAD officer Roberta Cryer, guest appearance of ex-Sgt Bob Cryer	Christopher King	Steve Hughes	17 September 2003	149
After the attack on Bradford by her alleged stalker, Cryer is suspended by Gold for ignoring the urgent assistance call. She calls her uncle Bob for help, trying to track down Bradford's victims. When Okaro discovers their private investigation, he furiously shuts it down. With all hope gone, Cryer goes to the one person who can answer all her questions: Bradford. Meanwhile, Taviner and Kent investigate an assault on a school teacher. Discovering the suspect is suffering from depression, Kent persuades the teacher to drop the charges, only to be brought back to earth with a bump when he misjudges the situation. Okaro and Ackland attend Page's bail hearing.
75	"The Dirty Dozen"	First appearance of CADO Dean McVerry; Ian Puleston-Davies guest stars	Nigel Keen	Tom Needham	18 September 2003	150
Best and Harman pursue a violent man on the run with a samurai sword. When his car is found abandoned, they discover it is an illegal cut and shut. They head to the garage where it was rebuilt, finding their suspect holding a mechanic hostage: Best's father Alan. Hunter works out Becker and McAllister are in a relationship; however, he ends up bonding with McAllister when they investigate a series of thefts. When a raid goes down, Hunter is assaulted by the suspect, so he arranges a painful revenge when he catches up to the suspect again. Smith is resentful when Okaro demands action on a series of street robberies, so Sharpe poses as a decoy. Meanwhile, Page spends her first day on remand bonding with her cellmate; however, she is upset that she's not heard from her boyfriend Max.
76	"Hallmark Moment"	Barry Jackson and Robert Boulter guest star	Nigel Keen	Damian Wayling	23 September 2003	151
Stamp and Murphy are stunned when they see a man on fire during their patrol. Drummond and Sharpe investigate, and Sharpe is disgusted to discover it boils down to a dispute over graffiti, while her investigation attempts are hampered by the suspect's racist remarks. Harman and Best find a severed arm at a cement works, with Hunter and McAllister having an amusing accident as they investigate. When another severed arm is handed in at the station, they investigate a possible series of thefts involving medical waste. Best cons Harman into thinking he has issues with intimacy in an attempt to get her into bed. Meanwhile, Page makes a grim discovery about her cellmate Eileen.
77	"Going Down in Flames"	Lysette Anthony and Robert Boulter guest star	Robert Del Maestro	Jaden Clark	24 September 2003	152
Sharpe is horrified when a suspect loses consciousness during an arrest. Questions are quickly raised owing to her early clashes with the boy, Brad Kelso, over his racist remarks to her in an interview earlier in the day. When Kelso dies in hospital, Sharpe is horrified to think her tactics have caused the death. Smithy mentions the comments he heard Sharpe make during the arrest to Okaro, but an incident from his days as a PC makes Okaro suspect Smith is a racist, who is left furious at the implication. Webb tries to get back on side with Meadows by investigating a theft from an escort from Rachel Heath's agency. Webb and Heath ensnare the suspect, Martin Delaney, in a sting; Webb believes he has Delaney nailed for identity theft, but a mixup in custody sees him escape, leaving Heath in serious danger. Meanwhile, Page reveals to CID that her cellmate Eileen is planning to have her boyfriend executed, in order to stop him testifying against her in court.
78	"Salt of the Earth"	Lysette Anthony and Doug Allen guest star	Robert Del Maestro	Simon McCleave	25 September 2003	153
Carver goes undercover at Page's prison, posing as a hitman for her cellmate Eileen. Meadows orders McAllister and Webb to track down absconded prisoner Martin Delaney after his vicious assault on Rachel Heath. Delaney then attacks Jane McGowan, the wife of the man whose identity he stole, although Webb suspects Delaney may have killed Eddie McGowan for not stopping Delaney being attacked in prison. Knowing Webb is trying to send him down, Delaney makes him his next target, laying a trap for an ambush. Sharpe faces her disciplinary meeting with the DPS for Brad Kelso's death in custody, but Smithy continues to try to prove her innocence, despite warnings from Okaro not to interfere in the case. Meanwhile, McAllister and Becker prepare to get revenge on Hunter for cheating on them, while McAllister rumbles Rachel Heath's relationship with Meadows.
79	"Haunted (Part 1)"	First appearance of DC Rob Thatcher; return of ex-DI Sally Johnson; Tom Wu and Ian Puleston-Davies guest star	Mark Walker	John Milne	2 October 2003	154
Webb is left in a state of shock after being raped by Martin Delaney. Smithy finds him at the scene, but Webb tells him he has to keep quiet. Smithy realises what happened and urges Webb to open up, but he refuses. When Smithy gets advice from DeCosta, Webb sees them and attacks Smithy, causing him to tell Meadows what he thinks happened between Webb and Delaney. Former Sun Hill DI Sally Johnson returns in her role as a private investigator, working on behalf of Jeff Simpson to expose Glaze and Taviner's cover-up of the station firebombing 18 months earlier. New DC Rob Thatcher arrives and immediately clashes with his colleagues, Nixon in particular laying down the law after his demotion from DS, having been a DC under him at their last station. He pairs with Hunter to investigate the stabbing of a possible illegal immigrant, but his methods don't go down well with the DS. Meanwhile, Best spots his dad liasing with Gold in a pub after work.
80	"Haunted (Part 2)"	Final appearance of DC Danny Glaze; John Bennett, Lysette Anthony and Justin Pickett guest star	Mark Walker	Emma Goodwin	8 October 2003	155
Webb determines to track down Martin Delaney to arrest him for the two assaults he is wanted for, but he refuses to make a statement about his rape. He goes to Delaney's old prison and discovers he too was a victim of rape. Suspecting Delaney has already killed the man who didn't stop the attack, Webb looks into his attacker in the hopes that Delaney will be going after him. Glaze and Carver investigate a burglary at the home of a former gang boss. When the man dies of a heart attack, his sons that took over the business go after the suspects. Glaze comes across £20,000 of the money from the burglary, and with Sally Johnson breathing down his neck, considers making a break for it. Meanwhile, after discovering Meadows is in a relationship with Rachel Heath, McAllister takes joy in spreading the word around CID, and Taviner discovers Murphy is pregnant.
81	"Antecedent"	First appearance of PC Yvonne Hemmingway; Amanda Drew guest stars	Susan Tully	Maxwell Young	9 October 2003	156
New PC Yvonne Hemingway joins Sun Hill and pairs with Klein. She immediately rubs Taviner up the wrong way by getting the Area Car on her first day, while she clashes with Young over a case involving Beth Tyler, a witness in a rape case earlier in the year. Tyler is seen with a girl gang who are implicated in a car theft, with a cyclist hit by the car during a pursuit. Meanwhile, Meadows heads for lunch with Sally Johnson; he is sceptical when she shares her suspicions about Glaze and Taviner, but, when he gets back, he receives Glaze's warrant card in the post. Taviner and Young attend a cot death, and with Taviner thinking he is the father of Murphy's baby, he has a heart to heart with her as the case hits too close to home.
82	"Fatality"	First appearance of SRO Marilyn Chambers; Amanda Drew guest stars	Susan Tully	Chris Fewtrell	15 October 2003	157
Taviner and Murphy revisit the cot death call from the day before when the baby's father is found on the roof of St. Hugh’s, intent on ending his life. Murphy remains suspicious of the mother, and comments made after her husband is talked down strengthen Murphy's theory. Young pairs with Hemingway as Beth Tyler is arrested on suspicion of super gluing another girl's hands together. When another incident occurs, they realise they’ve had the wool pulled over their eyes, while Young is put at risk when another prank goes wrong. Taviner has a sit down with Sally Johnson, but news of Johnson's digging soon gets around the angered relief. Taviner later decides on where he stands with Murphy and their unborn baby.
83	"Dead and Gone"	Final appearance of Sally Johnson; Ian Puleston-Davies guest stars	Peter Butler	Carol Ann Docherty	16 October 2003	158
Thatcher and Kane conduct a raid on drug dealer Mark "Chopsy" Doyle, with Meadows hoping they can get Chopsy to give up his supplier. While he is initially reluctant, he agrees to turn informant when his daughter's mother dies after overdosing on his drugs. The info leads them to arrest Best's father, Alan; however, Gold demands his release, with Meadows told he's an informant and unknowing courier of the drugs. Best is furious that he has been cleared once more, so he sets about inflicting his own punishment. Taviner and Hollis investigate the robbery of an elderly lady's pension outside the post office, but Taviner's mind is off the job after discovering Sally Johnson has taken Simpson's allegations about the firebombing to the DPS, so he goes to confront the ex copper and threatens her. As Taviner prepares to talk at the unveiling of the memorial plaque for the officers killed in the station fire, his guilt gets the better of him, so Murphy tries to get him to open up.
84	"Writing on the Wall"	Ian Puleston-Davies guest stars	Peter Butler	Maxwell Young	22 October 2003	159
Taviner admits to Murphy that he framed Jeff Simpson for the station firebombing, and when she continues to press him, he admits to starting the fatal blaze. She finds herself torn between her lover and doing the right thing. While she considers her options, Taviner and Hollis investigate another post office robbery; however, this time the victim has been stabbed. The victim's wife fails to identify the suspect in an ID parade, and when the shock causes a fatal heart attack, Taviner tracks down the suspect and inflicts a savage beating. With no answer from Murphy about her decision, a series of coincidences makes him think she's gone to Okaro, causing Taviner to flip out in an apparent suicide mission. Meanwhile, Best confesses to Stamp that he assaulted his father the day before. Unaware that his father's place of work is under observation, Best goes to see him, only to be drawn into a hostage situation.
85	"Lap of the Gods"	Terrence Hardiman guest stars	Ken Grieve	Mark Greig	23 October 2003	160
With the Area Car ablaze after crashing into a chemical warehouse, Smithy rushes in to make a rescue, while Stamp puts in the urgent assistance call. Smithy pulls Hollis from the car, but as he goes back for Taviner, a balcony collapses onto the two cars, causing another explosion. As the dust settles and the fire is extinguished, the body of the suspect they were pursuing is removed, but there is no sign of Taviner. Ackland tells a stunned Murphy of the crash, and she reveals Taviner is the father of her baby. Best fears the worst after his father's kidnapping, concerned they won't be able to put their differences to bed once and for all. Page's trial for Owen Preston's murder starts smoothly, but she is devastated when both Bradford and ex-boyfriend Max Wyatt betray her in the witness box. Meanwhile, Carver's wife Marie drunkenly harangues Ackland and presses her over her past relationships.
86	"Better Late than Never"	Charles Dale and Terrence Hardiman guest star	Ken Grieve	Nicholas McInerny	29 October 2003	161
After tracking down the hideaway of Jules Ellis, the kidnapper of Best's father, Gold and SO19 close in. When they discover an elderly couple living in the flat below Ellis haven't been evacuated, they stage a daring rescue, but Ellis catches them and compromises the rescue. Smithy volunteers himself as a hostage in exchange for the elderly couple's release, leaving Gold and SO19's DS Brand furious. Brand decides to conduct a raid against the wishes of Gold, who goes to Okaro to stop Brand putting Smith at risk. When the negotiator loses contact with Ellis, Gold changes her stance. Page takes to the stand at her trial and decides to tell the truth, in a last-ditch effort to save herself from being found guilty of the murder of Dr Owen Preston, but Bradford's 'performance' threatens to convince the jury of her lies. The search for Taviner's body in the remains of the warehouse continues, while Becker and Bradford are put at risk after conducting the seemingly straightforward arrest of a drunk man.
87	"Fatal Consequences"	Final appearance of DC Juliet Becker; departures of DC Mickey Webb and PC Des Taviner; Charles Dale, Denise Black, Cathy Shipton and Aaron Taylor-Johnson guest star	Sylvie Boden	Tom Needham	30 October 2003	162
Live episode: Bradford and Becker are held hostage by a knife-wielding drunk in the rear yard. The man drags Becker into a carrier, allowing Bradford to raise the alarm. Okaro orders a raid, but Becker is stabbed during the rescue attempts. Webb returns to Sun Hill on attachment from MIT, and he makes it clear he has moved on from his rape a few weeks earlier. With the van belonging to Jules Ellis found covered in blood, Webb states it's unlikely that Alan Best is still alive. He aids Nixon and Drummond with the interview of Ellis, but he refuses to cooperate. Best begins to fear the worst with his father nowhere to be seen, and before long the body of his father is found. When anger overrides Best's grief, he lashes out, leading to a dramatic showdown. Carver ends up in A&E after another assault by his wife Marie, and when he meets Ackland while there, they bond over their 20 years at Sun Hill.
88	"What's the Scoop?"	Departure of PC Polly Page; Lorraine Kelly and Terrence Hardiman guest star	Sylvie Boden	Katherine Smith	5 November 2003	163
Page's trial draws to a close as she's found guilty of murder. Bradford's reputation amongst the relief takes a further nosedive when she has an unauthorized interview with Lorraine Kelly, telling national TV that Page's colleagues don't think she's a good cop and is guilty as charged, leading to a formal reprimand from Okaro. He has further problems as council nominee Nicola Marsh riles the local residents about alleged racist attacks on white people. Ackland and Kent deal with the fallout, but it's an emotional day for Ackland as finding out about Page's trial is followed by a bigger bombshell. When Okaro discovers Taviner is still alive, Ackland tells Murphy; however, she lets slip that Taviner confessed to starting the station fire.
89	"Overdue Honeymoon"	—	Rupert Such	Patrick Melanaphy	6 November 2003	164
Okaro struggles to maintain racial tensions as newly appointed councillor Nicola Marsh goes head to head with community leader Veejay Sud about a pair of recent attacks. Kane and DeCosta are assigned to both, an assault on a white youth and another on an Asian man. Realising the cases are linked to a dispute at the restaurant where the Asian man works, Okaro sends Kent and Ackland undercover as patrons to see if there will be another attack. Meanwhile, Hunter and Thatcher investigate separate attacks on a business owner and his property, but Hunter's mind is off the job as his wife Cindy struggles with an impending IVF appointment.
90	"Live a Charmed Life"	DC Terry Perkins transfers to Sun Hill	Rupert Such	Julian Perkins	12 November 2003	165
The investigation into the assault of Cyril Brewer and his business gives Hunter and Klein a blast from the past, as corrupt boxing promoter Dennis Weaver is on scene when Brewer's son Joel is assaulted at a local gym. Gold suspects Weaver is rigging a fight involving Joel, and that the assault on his father and damage to their business were warnings to cooperate. Weaver's return brings back Klein's memories of being manipulated by Hunter, and he contemplates getting his own back. Hunter has other troubles when wife Cindy reveals she is not pregnant, and that she wants nothing more to do with him if he doesn't continue IVF. DC Terry Perkins, who met Ackland at Barton Street a few weeks earlier, joins Sun Hill as the CSU's Public Protection Officer. He pairs with Sharpe when registered sex offender Ian Forrest takes home the daughter of a woman who he stopped from being mugged. When a false allegation tips Forrest over the edge, the girl is put at risk.
91	"Close to Home"	—	Audrey Cooke	Emma Goodwin	13 November 2003	166
Nixon and Gold continue their investigation into Dennis Weaver, with boxer Joel Brewer critically injured in hospital after a vicious assault. Hunter does his utmost to keep Weaver out of the limelight, with Klein contemplating a major gamble in his quest to get revenge on Hunter. Perkins secures rehab for convicted paedophile Ian Forrest, but his safety is compromised when a series of leaflets are posted around the neighbourhood exposing his criminal past, while Perkins makes a discovery that could put Forrest back inside. Meanwhile, DeCosta and Carver investigate a burglary at the home of an elderly woman in hospital. Carver's marital problems lead him to snap at DeCosta when he is attacked by a suspect. Harman is surprised when Stamp reveals he is dating a hospital cleaner.
92	"Doghouse"	Don Gilet and Colin McFarlane guest star	Audrey Cooke	Henrietta Hardy	19 November 2003	167
Hunter is assigned to the Weavers as FLO after the abduction of his illegitimate daughter Maddison, and he manipulates Dennis into admitting who is responsible. After securing Maddison's safety, Hunter issues a stark warning to Klein for toying with him about telling Dennis. He then pairs with Sharpe, investigating a knife attack on a prostitute in her home. Suspicion falls on a local schizophrenic youth who can see the woman's house from his bedroom; after being been arrested for assaulting Klein, who decides to drop the charges, they find a watch belonging to the victim in his possession. Hunter's heavy handed tactics lead him to alienate the suspect, so Sharpe interviews him off the record; however, her investigation puts her in severe danger. Meanwhile, Stamp and Harman arrest Carver's wife Marie for being drunk and disorderly.
93	"Blaze of Glory"	Paul Nicholas and Judi Bowker guest star	Neil Adams	Tom Higgins	20 November 2003	168
Almost a year on from her death, the Sun Hill team erect a memorial tree to PC Cass Rickman, thanks to her mother Lillian and her best friend Klein. He later tries to say to Hunter's wife Cindy that he lied about her husband conceiving a child, but Cindy sees straight through Klein's attempts, so they agree to arrange a paternity test. Smithy is first on scene at a burglary, and he finds one of the residents upstairs tied up. Convinced the man has been raped, Smithy endeavours to get him to admit it, but he makes a complaint that leads Okaro to tell Smithy his handling of Mickey Webb's attack is clouding his judgement. Kent opens up to Ackland as he breaks down at the scene of a fatal RTC, revealing his parents died in exactly the same manner. Meanwhile, Sharpe continues to suspect that Carver is abusing his wife Marie.
94	"A Bleeding Heart"	Philip McGinley guest stars	Neil Adams	Chris Bucknall	26 November 2003	169
DeCosta and Thatcher are hot on the tail of a man who has been secretly filming girls on video getting changed in the changing rooms of a local leisure centre. DeCosta, whose stepdaughter attends the centre, is sickened at the thought of her being a victim. When DeCosta finds her stepdaughter emotional while returning home, she drops a bombshell on a horrified DeCosta. Meanwhile, Ackland's judgement is called into question when she makes a wrongful arrest, but her investigation leads her to discover an unreported suicide. Hollis returns to work after the Area Car crash, pairing with Best after his own return, following the death of his father. They investigate the vicious attack on a blind woman, and the trail leads them to a young man covered in petrol threatening to set fire to a bank, leading Hollis to draw on his recent experiences to talk the boy down.
95	"Shooting the Daggers"	—	Brett Fallis	Emma Goodwin	27 November 2003	170
Okaro tasks Thatcher investigating the rape of DeCosta's stepdaughter, with Hemingway assigned as the SOIT officer. As the case develops, DeCosta and her stepdaughter receive disappointing news that could affect their hopes of getting a conviction. Stamp's girlfriend is found after being assaulted outside a hotel, but as she opens up to Stamp, Hollis and Klein become suspicious of her immigration status, jeopardising an operation to nail a gang of human traffickers. Carver's wife Marie continues her campaign of harassment against Ackland, and after Kent warns Carver that Marie have to stop, Kent attends a violent domestic at the Carver residence.
96	"Forgive and Forget"	—	Brett Fallis	Jake Riddell	3 December 2003	171
Kent tries to cover up his attack on Carver, but when Ackland calls him after realising where he is, Kent is forced to radio in that Carver has been seriously assaulted. Kent is fearful when he discovers Marie's son Ben was hiding upstairs. When the day's events take a toll on Kent, he lays his feelings on the line with Ackland. Gold and Sharpe interview Marie, and while she points the finger at Kent, Carver comes round and admits Marie has been abusing him. After telling Sharpe he won't press charges, she is determined to change his mind. Gold hopes she can use the allegations to bring Kent down, but she makes an off the record inquiry, leading to shock a discovery about his past.
97	"Twenty-Twenty Hindsight"	T. J. Ramini guest stars	Steve Kelly	Will Benjamin	4 December 2003	172
Harman and Kent investigate a serious assault, with the victim suffering a head injury. As Harman returns to their panda car, she finds a newborn baby abandoned on the back seat. Hunter takes the assault case, while Kane pairs with Harman to track down the baby's mother. When the mother comes forward, they arrange a meeting; with her brother coming forward, he accompanies them to the meeting, only for the girl to run off. Nixon, fretting over the news that Okaro will decide on who gets the permanent DI's role by the end of the day, pairs with McAllister on an assault. However, when they search the victim's home, they find her sister's body in the bath. Having discovered she was epileptic and knew not to bathe alone, they suspect foul play. Meanwhile, Gold and Smith are left unsure on how to act after discovering Kent is Ackland's long-lost son, but the pair are left completely unaware Kent and Ackland have started a relationship.
98	"Pandora's Box"	Phoebe Thomas guest stars	Steve Kelly	Damian Wayling	10 December 2003	173
Klein and Best attend a hit and run on a recently released driver who ran over and killed a young girl, but Klein is late to book drugs from the victim into the property stores, leading to a clash with Best over a false assumption he is back on drugs. Hunter, Nixon and Drummond investigate the attack, but progress is hampered when Hunter discovers Nixon is missing out on the permanent DI position, and he takes great joy in stringing his nemesis along. However, he is left completely unaware that Klein has secured the paternity test for Maddison Weaver, and has given it to Hunter's wife Cindy. Meanwhile, Stamp is accused of racism after an incomplete stop and search, but the complainant is not as innocent as first suspected, leaving Stamp infuriated by Okaro's attitude to the complaint.
99	"Bulldozer"	Pooky Quesnel guest stars	Ged Maguire	Graham Mitchell	11 December 2003	174
Klein, Harman, Hemingway and Best pursue a teenager dangerously driving his mother's car. When they find the boy's mother badly attacked in a suspected domestic incident, DeCosta tasks Bradford with interviewing the woman. However, her poor tactics leave the woman an emotional wreck, so Nixon encourages DeCosta to ask Okaro for Bradford's removal from CSU. While the case takes a drastic turn, Bradford takes horrific action to get Harman away from Kane. Meanwhile, Murphy confronts Klein over what Best suspected was a drug deal he witnessed the day before, so he admits that he was giving Hunter's wife Cindy the paternity test for Maddison Weaver. Nixon discovers this, while Cindy lashes out at Dennis and Christine Weaver, putting Hunter at risk.
100	"Hit the Jackpot"	First appearance of Ch Supt Louise Campbell; PC Cathy Bradford returns to uniform	Ged Maguire	Emma Goodwin	17 December 2003	175
Klein meets with new Borough Commander, Louise Campbell, as the rift between Okaro and uniform worsens. However, their meeting is interrupted by an armed gang who attack Campbell and hospitalise the restaurant owner. A raid is launched on somebody Klein identifies, but another suspect jumps off a sixth storey landing, leading to backlash from the community spearheaded by racist councillor Nicola Marsh. Bradford returns to uniform; however, her focus is on Kane as she convinces him to move in, thrilled that her framing of Harman for the fire at Kane's house was successful. Meanwhile, Stamp and Hollis attend a suspected racially motivated assault, and McAllister takes over the investigation when the victim is reported missing by his wife.
101	"Tender Age"	Alibe Parsons guest stars	Christopher King	John Milne	18 December 2003	176
Okaro goes out in the Area Car to improve morale amongst the relief, pairing with Stamp after an attempted robbery ends in a pursuit and fatal crash, with the pursuing Best devastated at the outcome of the chase. Despite Stamp and Okaro's recent differences, they find themselves bonding, and Stamp ends up giving a lesson about life on the front line to his boss when they both end up facing official complaints. Gold and Murphy go to see the complainant in an attempt to convince her otherwise, but Gold gets more than she bargains for when Murphy goes into labour in a crowded market. Hemingway and Klein arrest Christine Weaver for shoplifting, but when DeCosta talks to Christine, she works out Hunter is Maddison Weaver's father, so she tries to convince her colleague to step up to the plate where his daughter is concerned.
102	"On a Lonely Island"	Arthur White and Simon Coates guest star	Christopher King	Julian Perkins	23 December 2003	177
Smith and Kent arrest two boys for shoplifting, but Smith is intrigued when he finds over £3500 on one of them, Leo Price. When he refuses to admit where the money is from, Smith confiscates it. As Leo is bailed, he sees a local dealer outside the station, so he punches Smith to avoid retribution. Thatcher and Kent set up an OBBO to catch the dealers, but it is blown when they have to prevent a serious assault. Bradford and Young deal with a warring couple who have just divorced; having dealt with a thief at fiancée Max's workplace, he helps Kane find somewhere else to live, and the case of the warring couple on top of Kane moving out leads Bradford to end things with Max once and for all. Meanwhile, Klein steps up his campaign of revenge against Hunter when it seems like his wife Cindy wants to reunite with her cheating husband.
103	"Chasing the Dragon"	First appearance of DI Neil Manson; Acting DI Samantha Nixon returns to DS; departure of Cindy Hunter; Harry Landis guest stars	Terry Iland	Julian Perkins	24 December 2003	178
New DI Neil Manson arrives and Sun Hill immediately thrusts himself into two major cases. Thatcher and Nixon investigate the disappearance of a pensioner, who is later found in a crackhouse, discovering he has become an addict. Smith is disappointed to discover that Leo Price is involved with the pensioner's grandson, suspected of getting his grandfather addicted to drugs. When the pensioner is thrown off a balcony, Manson threatens Leo into giving up the names of the attackers. Manson gets another big case when Smith finds the body of Bradford's fiancé Max Wyatt, unaware that Bradford was the culprit. Meanwhile, Klein and Hemingway arrest Hunter's wife Cindy for fighting with Christine Weaver. Despite being an old friend of Manson, Hunter finds himself on the end of an official warning, and his day is destined to get worse when Klein colludes with Cindy to get the ultimate revenge for both of them.
104	"The Law"	Guest appearance of Roberta Cryer; Terence Beesley guest stars	Terry Iland	Michael Jenner	30 December 2003	179
After finding CCTV of Bradford with his deceased wife Tanya in the car park where she died, Kane takes the tape to Harman, horrified that Bradford may have killed his wife. His digging takes him to Bradford's nemesis; former reception officer Robbie Cryer. She reveals all she knows; Bradford likely killed Tanya, might have been responsible for Max Wyatt's murder and that Bradford is obsessed with him. Kane takes his suspicions to Meadows, but he asks for more proof. When Harman discovers Bradford has reported her ASP missing, Kane goes back to Bradford's house to see if he can get the proof he needs. Meanwhile, Manson pairs with Perkins to investigate a series of hammer attacks on women; however, they suspect the most recent attack might be unrelated.
105	"Lured into the Trap"	Guest appearance of Roberta Cryer; Francis Magee, Robert Wilfort and Harriet Thorpe guest star	Baz Taylor	Colin Wyatt	31 December 2003	180
Kane confronts Bradford as he determines to prove she is a double murderer. Meadows and Gold begin to suspect Kane's suspicions are correct when Stamp finds Robbie Cryer seriously assaulted. Before long forensics prove that Bradford killed Max Wyatt, but the Sun Hill team are unaware she has another trick up her sleeve, leaving Kane terrified. Meanwhile, Ackland and Kent attend when a stolen car is pulled out of the river. The owner reveals her dog was inside the car when it was stolen, and when a boy is found with bite marks, his father demands the dog is put down. The case is complicated when the bloodstained cardigan of a young girl is found in the boot, and that the boy has previously clashed with the owner, leaving the team unsure of the pieces add up.
