= Michael Fenwick Briggs =

British businessman (1926–2017)

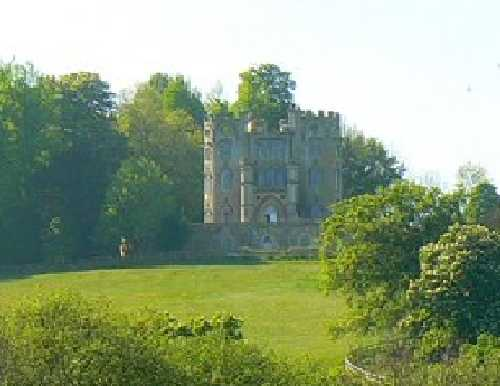
Midford Castle

Michael Fenwick Briggs (7 July 1926 – 22 July 2017) was a British businessman who led preservation work in Bath, Somerset.

The son of Dennis B. Briggs, of Oxford, and Grace Mary Davey Luke, Briggs was educated at Gresham's School, Holt, and Merton College, Oxford, as a Royal Air Force cadet.

In 1953, Briggs married the author and publisher Isabel Colegate, and they had two sons and a daughter.

A company director in the oil business, in 1961 Briggs bought and began to restore Midford Castle, a Strawberry Hill Gothic country house near Bath. He went on to serve for twenty years as Chairman of the Bath Preservation Trust. Briggs owned Midford Castle for more than 45 years, making repairs, treating a former chapel as a picturesque ruin in the grounds, buying back land and buildings which had previously been sold off, and thus bringing the size of the surrounding parkland and woodland up to 59 acres. The property was advertised for sale in 2007.

In 1984, Briggs’s daughter Emily Susanna married Jonathan G. Ashley.

Briggs died on 22 July 2017, aged 91.
