= In This House of Brede =

1969 novel by Rumer Godden

- First US edition
- Author: Rumer Godden
- Language: English
- Publication date: 1969

In This House of Brede is a novel by Rumer Godden published in 1969 by Viking in the US and by Macmillan in the UK.

== Synopsis ==
The novel is a portrait of religious life in England that centers on Philippa Talbot, a highly successful professional woman, who leaves her comfortable life among the London elite to join a Benedictine abbey as a postulant. It begins in 1954, as Philippa enters the monastery, Brede Abbey; continues through physical and mental difficulties at her first months; the first and the solemn vows in the changing, post-Second Vatican Council environment; and ends as Philippa reluctantly accepts the call to become prioress of a new Benedictine foundation in Japan, where she spent most of her childhood.

== Adaptations ==
In 1975, CBS made a TV film of this book, filmed in both Ireland and England, starring Diana Rigg (as Philippa), Pamela Brown, Gwen Watford, Denis Quilley, Judi Bowker and Nicholas Clay.

== Cultural references ==
The novel's fictional setting, Brede Abbey, is modeled on Stanbrook Abbey, formerly located in Worcestershire. In the book's introduction, Godden wrote that the characters were fictional but "many of the episodes are based on fact" and credits the lives and sayings of Dame Laurentia McLachlan and Sister Mary Ann McArdle of Stanbrook Abbey. Godden's introduction also thanks two other Benedictine abbeys: Talacre Abbey, in Wales, and St. Cecilia's Abbey in Ryde, on the Isle of Wight.
