= Fatal Consequences (The Bill) =

- The Bill episode
- Episode no.: Series 19; Episode 87
- Directed by: Sylvie Boden
- Written by: Tom Needham
- Original air date: 30 October 2003
- Running time: 60 minutes

Guest appearances
- Anthony Hunt as Jules Ellis; Charles Dale as Mark Nevett; Denise Black as Anna Nevett; Cathy Shipton as Liz Clough; Aaron Taylor-Johnson as Zac Clough

Episode chronology
← Previous "Better Late Than Never"	Next → "What's The Scoop?"
- The Bill (series 19)

"Fatal Consequences" is a live episode of the British television drama series The Bill, broadcast on ITV1 on 30 October 2003. The episode marks the 20th anniversary of the pilot episode "Woodentop", and was the first episode of The Bill to be broadcast live. It was written by Tom Needham, directed by Sylvie Boden and produced by Susan Mather and Donna Wiffen.

== Plot ==
DC Juliet Becker and PC Cathy Bradford are being held hostage by a drunk called Mark Nevett (Charles Dale). Nevett demands Cathy gets in the boot of a car, which she refuses, so he drags Juliet over to a carrier van. Despite Cathy's protestations, Juliet opens the door and Nevett pushes her into the van. In custody, after confronting prisoner Jules Ellis about revealing where the missing father of PC Gary Best is located, Sergeant Dale Smith is approached by PC Tony Stamp, who rants about Cathy betraying PC Polly Page at her murder trial. As they discuss events of the trial, Cathy rushes in and sounds the custody alarm, explaining that Juliet is being held hostage in the carrier van outside. As Inspector Gina Gold talks to Acting DI Samantha Nixon about interviewing Jules Ellis, she receives a call about events in the rear yard. She accompanies Superintendent Adam Okaro to the yard to coordinate a rescue; as Supt. Okaro's efforts to negotiate fail, he orders a team to storm the van. As they do, Juliet is rescued and Nevett is arrested, but they discover Juliet has been stabbed. While first aid efforts take place in the yard, DC Mickey Webb of the Murder Investigation Team arrives to assist Acting DI Nixon and DC Ken Drummond with the interview of Jules Ellis. Things are awkward for Sergeant Smith and PC Stamp over Mickey's recent rape, which led to his departure from Sun Hill, Smithy feeling especially guilty for exposing the rape against Mickey's wishes. Despite this, he tells them flat out that he is over the attack. Mickey then proceeds to interrupt Sam and Ken's interview with Ellis, just as it appears he is about to confess. Sam furiously blasts him, and she is further infuriated when Mickey says there is no chance Alan Best is still alive, just as his son Gary comes into earshot, destroying his last piece of hope. Back in the yard, Sergeant Sheelagh Murphy uses her training as a nurse to try and calm down Juliet, but their hopes of a quick move to hospital are affected by news that an RTC is causing a delay for the ambulance.

At St. Hugh's hospital, Sergeant June Ackland attends to a female victim of domestic assault, trying her utmost to assist a nurse deal with the chaos of Halloween admissions to the hospital. As she exits the waiting room, PC Jim Carver is revealed to be there after hiding behind a newspaper to not be seen by June. The nurse takes him to room and he claims he was putting up a shelf that collapsed onto him. As the nurse leaves him to attend to another issue, June enters his cubicle after hearing him talk to the nurse. She is skeptical about his claim about the shelf, suspecting he is being abused by his wife Marie (Melanie Hill). While he fails to open up about the abuse, they end up reminiscing on their 20 years together at Sun Hill. Back at the station, the ambulance finally arrives for Juliet. Elsewhere at the station, DCs Rob Thatcher and Eva Sharpe interview a boy who was found in possession of Alan Best's phone and wallet. His son Gary continues to spiral as he awaits the news of his father, expecting he won't be found alive. After snapping at PC Honey Harman and Sergeant Dale Smith earlier in the evening, he then demands Rob gives him two minutes with the boy, unaware his horrified mother is standing right next to him. Back at the hospital, June begins getting emotional about why Jim needs to leave Marie for his own sake, the nurse interrupts and reveals that Juliet has been brought in. Finding Inspector Gold and Sergeant Murphy, they watch on in horror as the crash team fail to revive Juliet. As she succumbs to her injuries, June follows a distraught Sheelagh outside and tries to comfort her, however she snaps and runs off. June is later told the victim of domestic assault has left, unaware that she is the wife of the man arrested for Juliet's murder, and she shows up at Sun Hill to discover her husband has committed murder. As Jim comforts June at the hospital, Marie arrives and begins to cause a scene, unaware that they are only emotional because Juliet died. After changing her tone, she goes to leave with Jim, making a point of saying that Jim walked into a cupboard door, confirming June's suspicions that Marie has been abusing him. Back at the station, Sheelagh hears a voice call her name in the yard, but she doesn't see her ex-lover Des Taviner appear from behind a car, revealing to the viewers that he survived the Area Car crash and explosion several episodes earlier. In custody, a team swarm around Juliet's killer Mark Nevett, but while Superintendent Okaro orders them to get off him, PC Gabriel Kent reveals he has swallowed his tongue. As Rob and Eva find Alan Best's body, news reaches Gary at the station, who storms into custody and attacks Ellis as he heads back to his cell under guard. Ellis runs off out of the open door and into the yard, chased onto the roof by Gary and Smithy. Ellis knocks Smithy over on the roof, then proceeds to swing a metal bar at Gary; as he drops his guard, Gary flies at him, causing them both to fall off the roof and land on a passing van. Fireworks begin exploding in the sky above the station.

== Production ==
Executive producer Paul Marquess said the idea to do a live episode was first mooted over a year before the anniversary. Knowing it would be 20 years since the show's pilot episode "Woodentop" was broadcast and with the increase in ratings, the producers thought it would be a good opportunity to do "something ambitious" to celebrate and publicise the show.

Charles Dale guests in the episode as "crazed knifeman" Mark Nevett, who is holding DC Juliet Becker hostage at the start of the episode. The episode marks Dale's fifth appearance in The Bill and his second live episode, after he starred in the live Coronation Street episode in 2000. Dale did not have to audition for the role, after producers contacted him and asked him to play the part.

== Reception ==
"Fatal Consequences" was watched a cumulative audience of 10.41 million viewers. Its original screening averaged 9.9 million viewers, attaining a 40% audience share.

For their work on the episode, the camera team received a nomination for the Best Lighting, Photography and Camera – Multicamera Work accolade at the 2004 RTS Craft & Design Awards.
