= Harry Meacher =

British actor, director and playwright

Harry Meacher is a British actor, director and playwright.

== Biography ==
Harry Meacher grew up in Hainault, near Chigwell, Essex. In his teens he worked with Joan Littlewood in Stratford and with James Cooper in Ilford. He won a scholarship to the Royal Academy of Dramatic Art, then performed at the Royal Court Theatre, in London's West End and at many leading regional venues. At the National Theatre he worked under Laurence Olivier, and later played Martin Dysart there during the run of the original production of Equus directed by John Dexter.

One of his early appearances as a leading actor was seen by Alec Guinness, who said to him afterwards, "You were very good. The Times said so. I read their review. And I know you did—because you were playing the review, rather than the part! Promise me you will stop reading reviews." Meacher stopped reading drama criticism.

Roles in Shakespeare included Pistol to Frank Middlemass's Falstaff, and Exton to Ian McKellen's Richard II. In the death scene at one performance, Exton's blade broke the skin on the King's back; McKellen appeared ready for the curtain call handing Meacher a stiff drink to help him get over it.

He also performed in Twelfth Night and A Midsummer Night's Dream.

His screen appearances have ranged from series including Dixon of Dock Green, The Scarlet Pimpernel, Softly Softly, Special Branch and The Troubleshooters to major films, including Trial By Combat, Transatlantis and Kannibal.

He has written and adapted plays which have been performed in London, and he toured the Mediterranean with his wife Judi Bowker in his own play The Brownings. His plays Buccaneer and A Haunting Twist have been seen in New York and elsewhere in America. He has toured capital cities in the Middle and Far East, Australia and New Zealand. His adaptations include works by Chekhov, Ibsen, Strindberg, Gorky and Dickens. With Kit Gerould he co-wrote The Sensualist which played at the Arts Theatre in London. He directed and performed in Uncle Vanya which won Time Out's Critics' Choice award. He has played the title roles in King Lear, Macbeth, Othello, Richard III, Ivanov, Shylock in The Merchant of Venice and Prospero in The Tempest. In his own adaptation from Conan Doyle, he portrayed Sherlock Holmes. He directed Hedda Gabler starring his wife Judi Bowker.

Over his many productions, he built up at North West London theatre venues and sometimes touring wider afield what was in effect the nucleus of a small-scale classical company, performing both Shakespeare and the later literary greats. As well as Judi Bowker, the team often included Georgia Cardy, Bryan Hands, Emily Holden, Adam Lewis, Seamus Newham, Tom Reah, Roger Sansom and Jonson Wilkinson.

He co-founded Coachhouse Films, whose work has been shown on television.

== Personal life ==
Meacher has been married to the actress Judi Bowker since 1979 and, as of 2017, have lived near – and worked in productions at – the Upstairs at the Gatehouse theatre in Highgate for decades.

== Documentary Sources ==
- Who's Who In The Theatre Sixteenth Edition Edited by Ian Herbert Pub. Pitman Ltd London 1978
- British Theatre Review 1974 Edited by Eric Johns Pub. Vance-Offord Publications, Eastbourne, 1975
- National Theatre Archive, South Bank, London
