= The Shooting Party (Colegate novel) =

1980 novel by Isabel Colegate

- First edition
- Author: Isabel Colegate
- Language: English
- Publisher: Hamish Hamilton (UK)
- Publication date: 1980 (UK)
- Publication place: United Kingdom
- Media type: Print (hardcover)
- ISBN: 9780241104736

The Shooting Party is the ninth novel by Isabel Colegate, published in 1980, which won the 1981 WH Smith Literary Award. It was adapted into the 1985 film The Shooting Party. It was published as part of the Penguin Books Modern Classic series.

== Synopsis ==
The novel takes place "in the autumn before the outbreak of what used to be known as the Great War," in Nettleby Park, which "was very large in those days, nearly a thousand acres (an eighth of the whole estate)," all of it the property of Sir Randolph, a gentleman of conservative leanings who laments the coming of a new age of "striking industrial workers, screaming suffragettes, Irish terrorists, scandals on the Stock Exchange, universal suffrage." It outrages him that "the politicians are determined to turn this country into an urban society instead of a rural one" and to "take away the power of the landed proprietor." He may seem at first a caricature of the British upper class, but he is simply a man of another time, a paternalistic patrician who believes it his duty to care for the men and women who work on his farm. His instincts are kind and his sense of humor is fully functional, including when it is directed at himself.

== Reception ==
In a 1981 book review by Kirkus Reviews called the book "a decorous, atmospheric short novel which much too deliberately packs all the End-of-Old-England motifs into one weekend at an Oxfordshire estate." and summarized; "From start to finish, then, there's far too little real characterization and far too much prototyping here—as Colegate's metaphor-essay approach scrambles to include every 1913 issue, from Ireland and the failure of romanticism to budding feminism and the ""bigger shooting party"" that is war. Still, it's all done with grace, well-crafted vignettes, and a strong (if studied) Chekhovian feel for people-against-landscape—so readers more disposed to mood than storytelling will find this an evocative and elegantly restrained replay of Shaw's Heartbreak House milieu." Reviewing the book in 2008 for The Washington Post, Jonathan Yardley wrote, "That she has managed to take on [these] very large subjects in a book of fewer than 200 pages, and to consider them through a cast of wholly human characters, is a remarkable accomplishment."

The Shooting Party won the 1981 WH Smith Literary Award.

== See also ==
- Edwardian era
