= Isabel Colegate =

British author and literary agent (1931–2023)

Isabel Colegate FRSL
- Born: Isabel Diana Colegate; 10 September 1931; London, England, United Kingdom
- Died: 12 March 2023 (aged 91)
- Occupations: Author and literary agent
- Notable work: The Shooting Party
- Spouse: Michael Fenwick Briggs (m. 1953; died 2017)
- Children: 3
- Parent(s): Winifred Mary and Arthur Colegate
- Relatives: Sir William Worsley, 3rd Baronet (grandfather); Katharine, Duchess of Kent (cousin)
- Awards: WH Smith Literary Award

Isabel Diana Colegate FRSL (10 September 1931 – 12 March 2023) was a British author and literary agent.

== Early life and education ==
Born in Paddington in London, England, Colegate was the youngest of her parents' four daughters. Her father was Sir Arthur Colegate, while her mother was Winifred Mary, a daughter of Sir William Worsley, 3rd Baronet, and the widow of Captain Francis Percy Campbell Pemberton of the 2nd Life Guards, who had been killed in action in the First World War.

Colegate was a first cousin of Katharine, Duchess of Kent, who was also a granddaughter of Sir William Worsley, 3rd Baronet.

She was educated at Runton Hill School in Norfolk.

== Career ==
In 1952, Colegate, in partnership with Anthony Blond, set up the publishing firm, Anthony Blond (London) Ltd.

Colegate's novel The Shooting Party (1980) was adapted as an award-winning film of the same name, released in 1985 by Castle Hill Productions Inc. In 2010, the novel was adapted for radio by the BBC.

== Marriage and children ==
In 1953, Colegate married Michael Fenwick Briggs. The couple had two sons, Barnaby and Joshua, and a daughter, Emily. From 1961 to 2007, they lived at Midford Castle near Bath.

== Death ==
Colegate died on 12 March 2023, at the age of 91.

== Awards and honours ==
- WH Smith Literary Award for The Shooting Party, 1981
- Fellow of the Royal Society of Literature (FRSL), 1981
- Honorary MA, University of Bath, 1988

== Bibliography ==
- The Blackmailer, 1958
- A Man of Power, 1960
- The Great Occasion, 1962
- Statues in a Garden, 1964
- Orlando King, 1968
- Orlando at the Brazen Threshold, 1971
- Agatha, 1973
- News from the City of the Sun, 1979
- The Shooting Party, 1980
- A Glimpse of Sion’s Glory, 1985
- Deceits of Time, 1988
- The Summer of the Royal Visit, 1991
- Winter Journey, 1995
- A Pelican in the Wilderness: Hermits, Solitaries, and Recluses, 2002
