= Fascia training =

Type of physical exercise

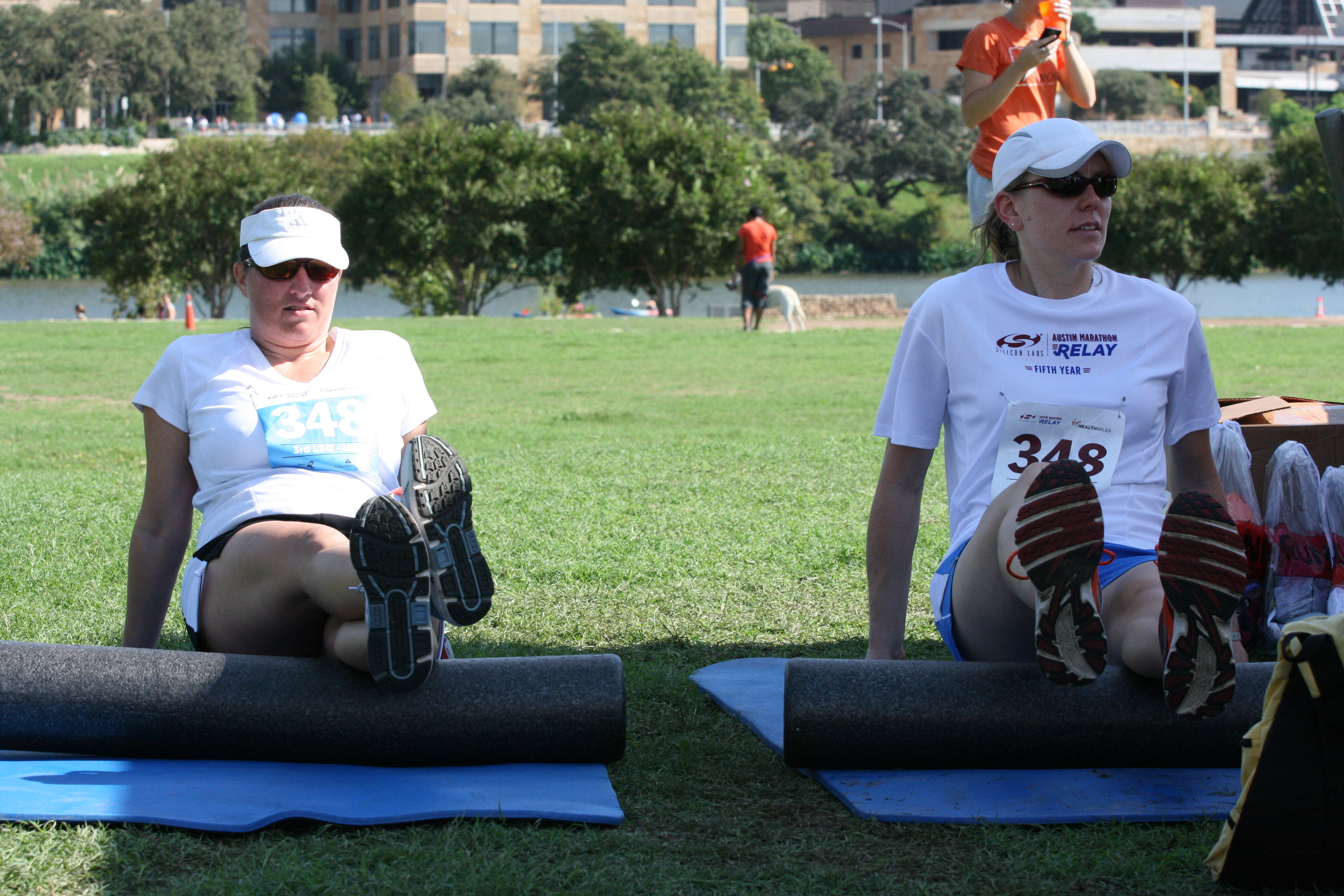
Two women use foam rollers to massage their leg muscles

Fascia training describes sports activities and movement exercises that attempt to improve the functional properties of the muscular connective tissues in the human body, such as tendons, ligaments, joint capsules and muscular envelopes. Also called fascia, these tissues take part in a body-wide tensional force transmission network and are responsive to training stimulation. As of 2018 the body-wide continuity of this tensional system has been expressed in an educational manner within the Fascial Net Plastination Project. The FNPP brought together experts in anatomy, dissection, and plastination, and it was the first project of its kind to plastinate a complete human fascia specimen.

== Origin ==
Whenever muscles and joints are moved this also exerts mechanical strain on related fascia. The general assumption in sports science had therefore been that muscle strength exercises as well as cardiovascular training would be sufficient for an optimal training of the associate fibrous connective tissues. However, recent ultrasound-based research revealed that the mechanical threshold for a training effect on tendinous tissues tends to be significantly higher than for muscle fibers. This insight happened roughly during the same time in which the field of fascia research attracted major attention by showing that fascial tissues are much more than passive transmitters of muscular tension (years 2007 – 2010). Both influences together triggered an increasing attention in sports science towards the question whether and how fascial tissues can be specifically stimulated with active exercises. Researchers who contributed to the initial scientific investigation of this direction include Robert Schleip, Jan Wilke, Michael Kjaer and Adamantios Arampatzis.

== Principles ==
Fascia training follows the following principles:

1. Preparatory counter-movement (increasing elastic recoil by pre-stretching involved fascial tissues);
2. The Ninja principle (focus on effortless movement quality);
3. Dynamic stretching (alternation of melting static stretches with dynamic stretches that include mini-bounces, with multiple directional variations);
4. Proprioceptive refinement (enhancing somatic perceptiveness by mindfulness oriented movement explorations);
5. Hydration and renewal (foam rolling and similar tool-assisted myofascial self-treatment applications);
6. Sustainability: respecting the slower adaptation speed but more sustaining effects of fascial tissues (compared with muscles) by aiming at visible body improvements of longer time periods, usually said to happen over 3 to 24 months.

== Evidence ==
While good to moderate scientific evidence exists for several of the included training principles – e.g. the inclusion of elastic recoil as well as a training of proprioceptive refinement – there is currently insufficient evidence for the claimed beneficial effects of a fascia oriented exercises program as such, consisting of a combination of the above described four training elements.

Self-myofascial release using a foam roller or roller massager pre- and post-exercise has been observed to decrease soreness due to DOMS. Self-myofascial release appears to have no negative effect on performance.
