= Fascia =

Layer of connective tissue in the body

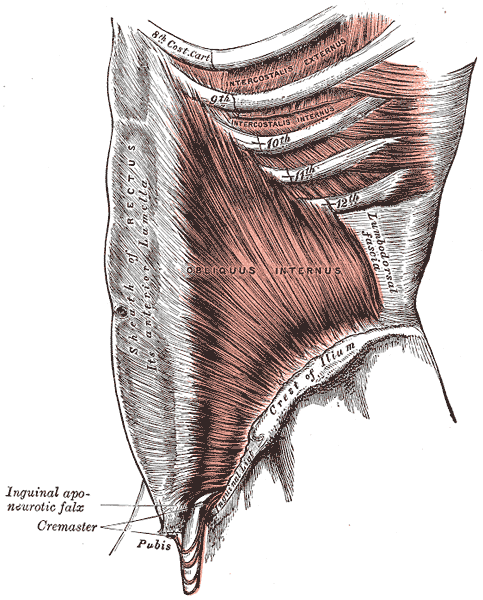
- The rectus sheath (extensive vertical darker gray at left), an example of a fascia

Details
- Precursor: Mesenchyme

Identifiers
- Latin: fascia
- MeSH: D005205
- TA98: A04.0.00.031
- TA2: 2015
- FMA: 78550

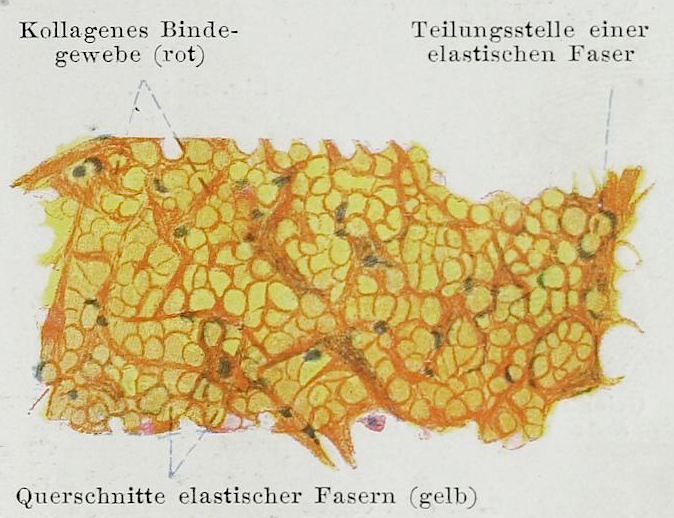
Microsopic image of a fascial structure (nuchal ligament)

A fascia (/ˈfæʃ(i)ə/; pl.: fasciae /ˈfæʃii/ or fascias; adjective fascial; from Latin fascia 'band') is a generic term for macroscopic membranous bodily structures. Fasciae are classified as superficial, visceral or deep, and further designated according to their anatomical location.

The knowledge of fascial structures is essential in surgery, as they create borders for infectious processes (for example Psoas abscess) and haematoma. An increase in pressure may result in a compartment syndrome, where a prompt fasciotomy may be necessary. For this reason, profound descriptions of fascial structures are available in anatomical literature from the 19th century.

== Function ==
Fasciae were traditionally thought of as passive structures that transmit mechanical tension generated by muscular activities or external forces throughout the body. An important function of muscle fasciae is to reduce friction of muscular force. In doing so, fasciae provide a supportive and movable wrapping for nerves and blood vessels as they pass through and between muscles.

In the tradition of medical dissections it has been common practice to carefully clean muscles and other organs from their surrounding fasciae in order to study their detailed topography and function. However, this practice tends to ignore that many muscle fibers insert into their fascial envelopes and that the function of many organs is significantly altered when their related fasciae are removed. This insight contributed to several modern biomechanical concepts of the human body, in which fascial tissues take over important stabilizing and connecting functions, by distributing tensional forces across several joints in a network-like manner similar to the architectural concept of tensegrity. Starting in 2018 this concept of the fascial tissue serving as a body-wide tensional support system has been successfully expressed as an educational model with the Fascial Net Plastination Project.

Fascial tissues – particularly those with tendinous or aponeurotic properties – are also able to store and release elastic potential energy.

Beyond storing and releasing elastic energy, fascial tissues contribute to proprioception and motor control through dense innervation with mechanoreceptors and nociceptors. Recent biomechanical studies also emphasize the role of fascial networks in distributing strain across multiple joints. This is an idea often framed as a body-wide tensegrity system, so that fascia participates dynamically in coordinated movement and postural stability.

== Anatomical compartments ==
A fascial compartment is a section within the body that contains muscles and nerves and is surrounded by fascia. In the human body, the limbs can each be divided into two segments. The upper limb can be divided into the arm and the forearm; their sectional compartments are the fascial compartments of the arm and the fascial compartments of the forearm, which both contain an anterior and a posterior compartment. The lower limbs can also be divided into two segments: the leg and the thigh; those contain the fascial compartments of the leg and the fascial compartments of the thigh respectively.

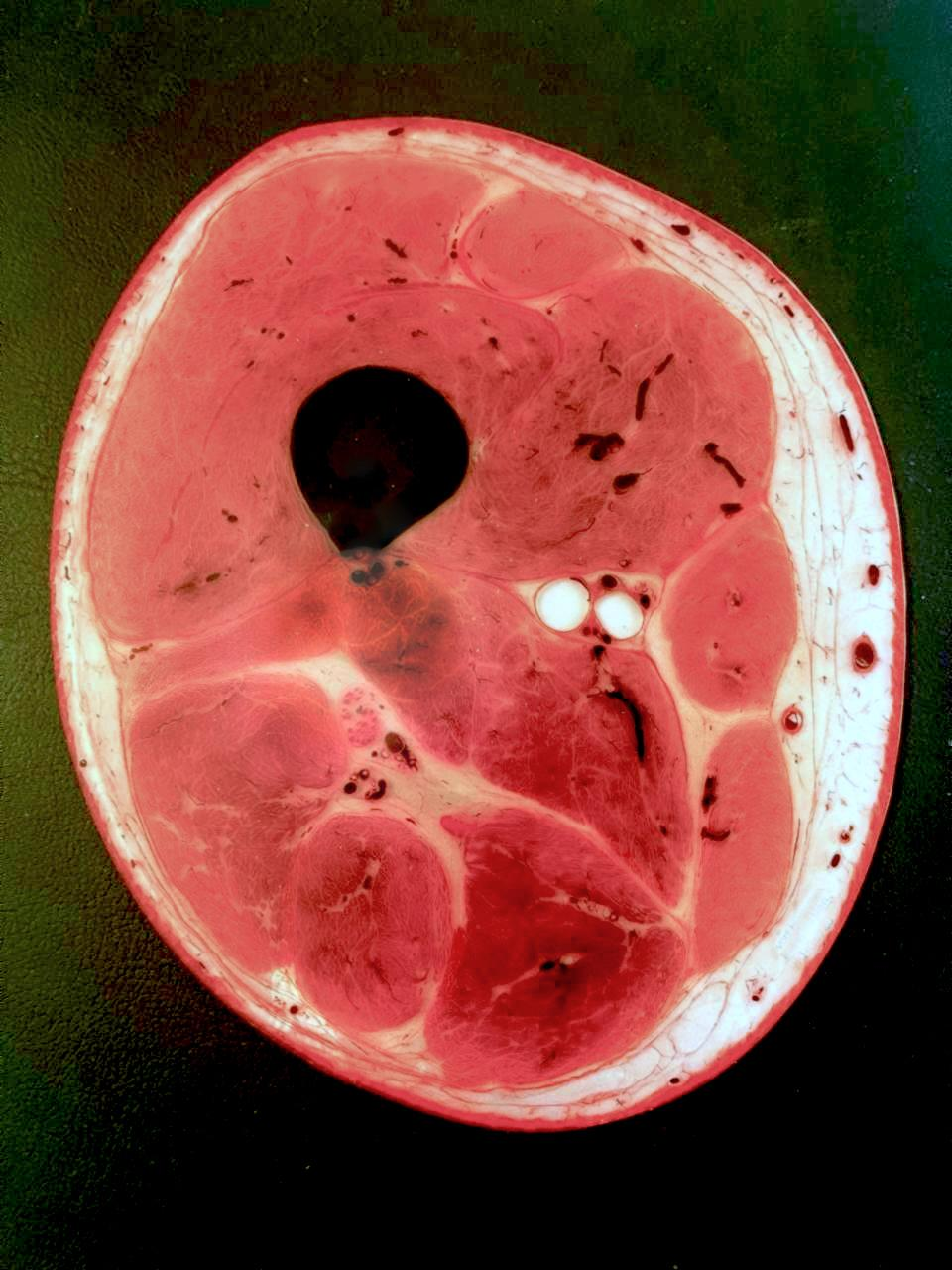
Photo of cross-sectional slice from a plastinated human thigh.

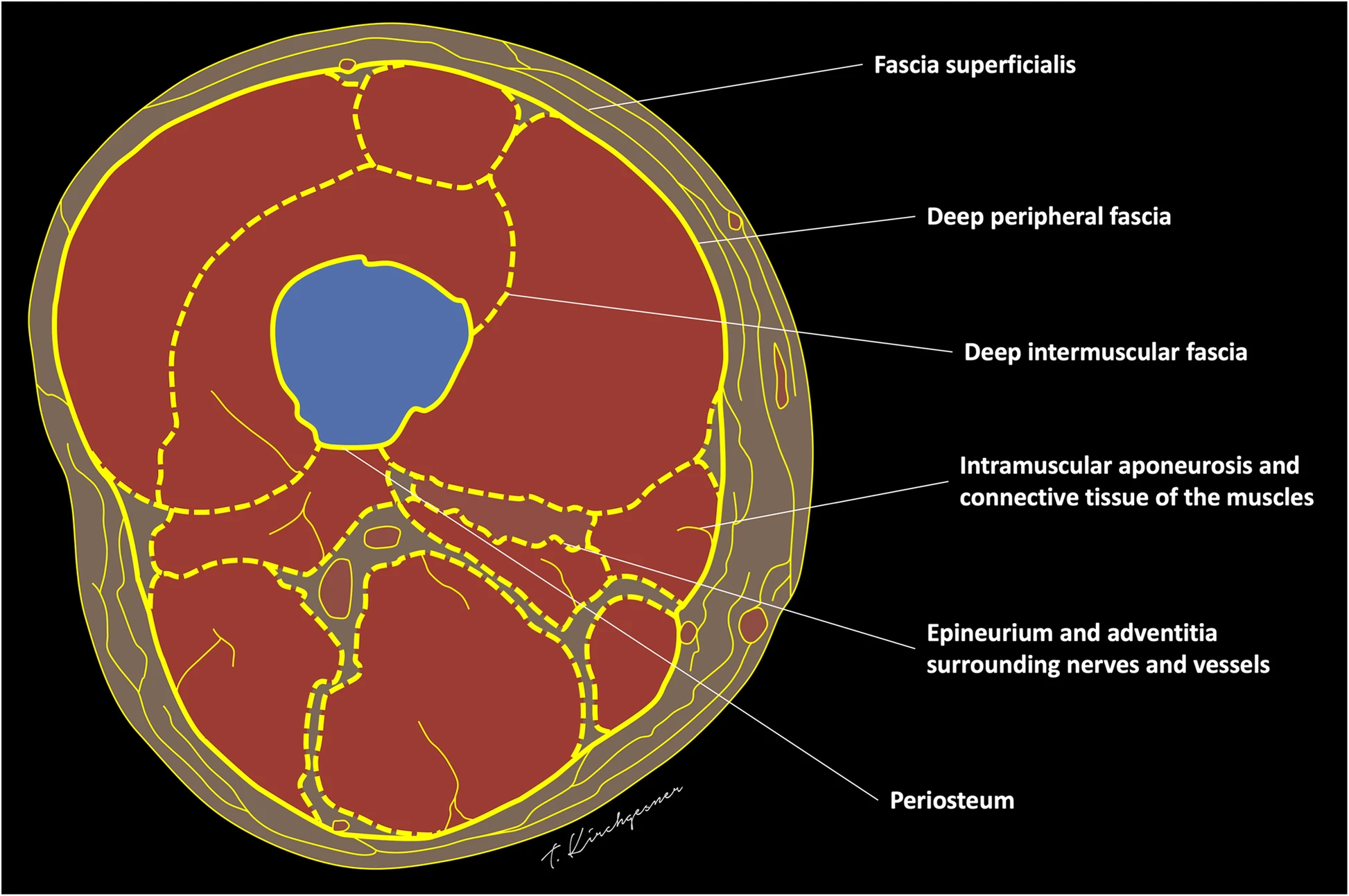
Schematic drawing of a transverse section of the thigh illustrating its fascial anatomy.

== Clinical significance ==
Fascia itself becomes clinically important when it loses stiffness, becomes too stiff, or has decreased shearing ability. Fascial dysfunction has been implicated in a range of musculoskeletal pain syndromes, including myofascial pain and some cases of chronic low back pain, where altered fascial gliding or adhesions may contribute to symptoms. Surgical disruption of fascial planes can produce postoperative adhesions and functional limitations. Rehabilitation approaches such as targeted physical therapy and myofascial release aim to restore fascial mobility and reduce pain, though high-quality randomized trials assessing long-term efficacy are limited. When pathology causes fibrosis and adhesions, fascial tissue fails to differentiate the adjacent structures effectively. This can happen for a number of reasons, such as

- After surgery, where the fascia has been incised and healing includes a scar that traverses the surrounding structures.
- Inflammatory diseases of the fascia, called Fasciitis
- Physical trauma, often injuries related sports or auto-collision
- Chronic psychomotor dysfunction, often driven by traumatic experiences, SMI, or SUD.

== Research ==
The Fascial Net Plastination Project (FNPP) is an anatomical research initiative led by fascia researcher Robert Schleip. The project aims to enhance the study of fascia through the technique of plastination. Led by an international team of fascia experts and anatomists, the FNPP resulted in the creation of a full-body fascia plastinate known as FR:EIA (Fascia Revealed: Educating Interconnected Anatomy). This plastinate provides a detailed view of the human fascial network, allowing for a better understanding of its structure and function as an interconnected tissue throughout the body.

FR:EIA was unveiled at the 2021 Fascia Research Congress and is currently exhibited at the Body Worlds exhibition in Berlin. This project represents a significant contribution to the visualization of fascia and has the potential to influence future research in fields such as medicine, physical therapy, and movement science.

== Terminology ==
There exists some controversy about what structures are considered "fascia" and how they should be classified.

The current version of the International Federation of Associations of Anatomists divides into:

- Fascia craniocervicalis
- Fascia trunci
  - Fascia parietalis
  - Fascia extraserosalis
  - Fascia visceralis
- Fasciae membrorum
- Fasciae musculorum
  - Fascia investiens
  - Fascia propria musculi

=== Previous terminology ===
Two former, rather commonly used systems are:

- The one specified in the 1983 edition of Nomina Anatomica (NA 1983)
- The one specified in the 1997 edition of Terminologia Anatomica (TA 1997)

NA 1983	TA 1997	Description	Example
Superficial fascia	(not considered fascia in this system)	This is found in the subcutis in most regions of the body, blending with the reticular layer of the dermis.	Fascia of Scarpa
Deep fascia	Fascia of muscles	This is the dense fibrous connective tissue that interpenetrates and surrounds the muscles, bones, nerves and blood vessels of the body.	Transverse fascia
Visceral fascia	Visceral fascia, parietal fascia	This suspends the organs within their cavities and wraps them in layers of connective tissue membranes.	Pericardium

==== Superficial ====
Superficial fascia is the lowermost layer of the skin in nearly all of the regions of the body, that blends with the reticular dermis layer. It is present on the face, over the upper portion of the sternocleidomastoid, at the nape of the neck and overlying the breastbone. It consists mainly of loose areolar and fatty adipose connective tissue and is the layer that primarily determines the shape of a body. In addition to its subcutaneous presence, superficial fascia surrounds organs, glands and neurovascular bundles, and fills otherwise empty space at many other locations. It serves as a storage medium of fat and water; as a passageway for lymph, nerve and blood vessels; and as a protective padding to cushion and insulate.

Superficial fascia is present, but does not contain fat, in the eyelid, ear, scrotum, penis and clitoris.

Due to its viscoelastic properties, superficial fascia can stretch to accommodate the deposition of adipose that accompanies both ordinary and prenatal weight gain. After pregnancy and weight loss, the superficial fascia slowly reverts to its original level of tension.

==== Visceral ====
Visceral fascia (also called subserous fascia) suspends the organs within their cavities and wraps them in layers of connective tissue membranes. Each of the organs is covered in a double layer of fascia; these layers are separated by a thin serous membrane.

- The outermost wall of the organ is known as the parietal layer
- The skin of the organ is known as the visceral layer. The organs have specialized names for their visceral fasciae. In the brain, they are known as meninges; in the heart they are known as pericardia; in the lungs, they are known as pleurae; and in the abdomen, they are known as peritonea.

Visceral fascia is less extensible than superficial fascia. Due to its suspensory role for the organs, it needs to maintain its tone rather consistently. If it is too lax, it contributes to organ prolapse, yet if it is hypertonic, it restricts proper organ motility.

==== Deep ====
Deep fascia is a layer of dense fibrous connective tissue which surrounds individual muscles and divides groups of muscles into fascial compartments. This fascia has a high density of elastin fibre that determines its extensibility or resilience. Deep fascia was originally considered to be essentially avascular but later investigations have confirmed a rich presence of thin blood vessels. Deep fascia is also richly supplied with sensory receptors. Histologically, fascia is composed predominantly of type I collagen fibers with variable amounts of elastin, which together determine tensile strength and extensibility. Fibroblasts are the principal resident cells, and fascial tissue contains vascular elements (particularly in deep fascia), immune cells such as macrophages and mast cells, and a dense array of sensory nerve endings; these features enable fascia to participate in repair, inflammation, and nociception. Examples of deep fascia are fascia lata, fascia cruris, brachial fascia, plantar fascia, thoracolumbar fascia and Buck's fascia.

== See also ==
- Clavipectoral fascia
- Endothoracic fascia
- Extracellular matrix
- Fascia (architecture)
- Interstitial cell
- Pectoral fascia
- Thoracolumbar fascia
- Myofascial trigger point
