= Achilles tendinitis =

Medical condition of the ankle and heel

- Other names: Achilles tendinopathy, Achilles tendonitis, Achilles tenosynovitis
- Drawing of Achilles tendinitis with the affected part highlighted in red
- Specialty: Rheumatology
- Symptoms: Pain, swelling around the affected tendon
- Usual onset: Gradual
- Duration: Months
- Types: Noninsertional, insertional
- Causes: Overuse
- Risk factors: Trauma, lifestyle that includes little exercise, high-heel shoes, rheumatoid arthritis, medications of the fluoroquinolone or steroid class
- Diagnostic method: Based on symptoms and examination
- Differential diagnosis: Achilles tendon rupture
- Treatment: Rest, ice, non-steroidal antiinflammatory agents (NSAIDs), physical therapy
- Frequency: Common

Achilles tendinitis, also known as Achilles tendinopathy, is soreness and irritation of the Achilles tendon. It is accompanied by alterations in the tendon's structure and mechanical properties. The most common symptoms are pain and swelling around the back of the ankle. The pain is typically worse at the start of exercise and decreases thereafter. Stiffness of the ankle may also be present. Onset is generally gradual.

Achilles tendinopathy is idiopathic, meaning the cause is not well understood. Theories of causation include overuse such as running, a lifestyle that includes little exercise, high-heel shoes, rheumatoid arthritis, and medications of the fluoroquinolone or steroid class. Diagnosis is generally based on symptoms and examination.

Proposed interventions to treat tendinopathy have limited or no scientific evidence to support them, such as pre-exercise stretching, strengthening calf muscles, avoiding over-training, adjustment of running mechanics, and selection of footwear. Treatment is symptomatic and non-specific such as ice, non-steroidal antiinflammatory agents (NSAIDs), and physical therapy. People who are not satisfied with symptomatic treatment may be offered surgery. Achilles tendinitis is relatively common.

== Signs and symptoms ==
Symptoms can vary from an ache or pain and swelling in the local area of one or both ankles, or a burning that surrounds the whole joint. With this condition, the pain is usually worse during and after activity, and the tendon and joint area can become stiff the following day, as swelling impinges on the movement of the tendon.

Achilles tendon injuries can be separated into insertional tendinopathy (20%–25% of the injuries), midportion tendinopathy (55%–65%), and proximal musculotendinous junction (9%–25%) injuries, according to the location of pain.

== Cause ==
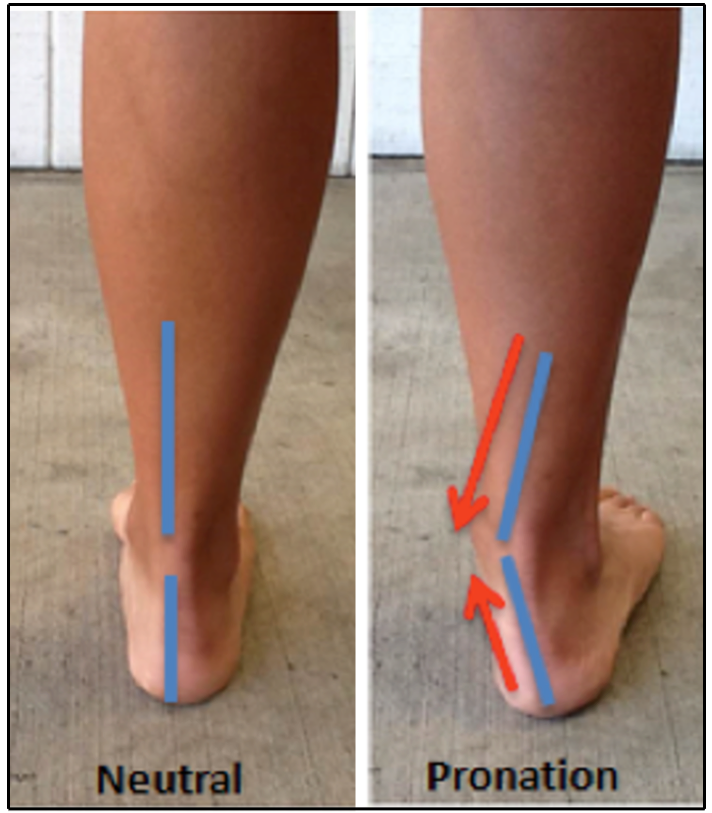
Demonstration of the right foot in pronation, neutral and supinated subtalar joint placements. Over-pronation (excessive pronation) occurs when the ankle begins to roll inward by more than 5 degrees, demonstrated with the arrows.

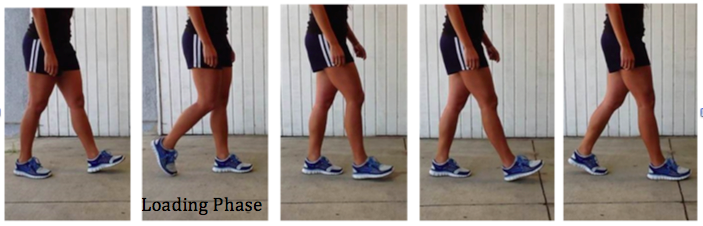
Walking gait cycle starting with the left leg demonstrated. The loading cycle is where foot pronation naturally occurs.

Achilles tendinitis is a common injury, particularly in sports that involve lunging and jumping, occurs both laterally and bilaterally, and is often induced in a single ankle by trauma. It is also a known side effect of fluoroquinolone antibiotics such as ciprofloxacin, as are other types of tendinitis.

Achilles tendinitis is thought to have physiological, mechanical, or extrinsic (i.e. footwear or training) causes. The Achilles tendon has a generally poor blood supply throughout its length, as measured by the number of vessels per cross-sectional area. Blood is supplied via the synovial sheaths that surround it. This lack of blood supply can lead to the degradation of collagen fibers and inflammation. Tightness in the calf muscles has also been known to be involved in the onset of Achilles tendinitis.

During the loading phase of the running and walking cycle, the ankle and foot naturally pronate and supinate by approximately 5 degrees. Excessive pronation of the foot (over 5 degrees) in the subtalar joint is a type of mechanical mechanism that can lead to tendinitis.

An overuse injury refers to repeated stress and strain, which is likely the case in endurance runners. Overuse can simply mean an increase in running, jumping or plyometric exercise intensity too soon. Another consideration would be the use of improper or worn-down footwear, which lack the necessary support to maintain the foot in the natural/normal pronation.

== Pathophysiology ==
Because the Achilles tendon does not have good blood supply, injuries can be slow to heal. The tendon receives nutrients from the tendon sheath or paratendon. When an injury occurs to the tendon, cells from surrounding structures migrate into the tendon to assist in repair. Some of these cells come from blood vessels that enter the tendon to provide direct blood flow to increase healing. With the blood vessels come nerve fibers. Researchers including Alfredson and his team in Sweden believe these nerve fibers to be the cause of the pain – they injected local anaesthetic around the vessels and this decreased significantly the pain in the Achilles tendon.

== Diagnosis ==
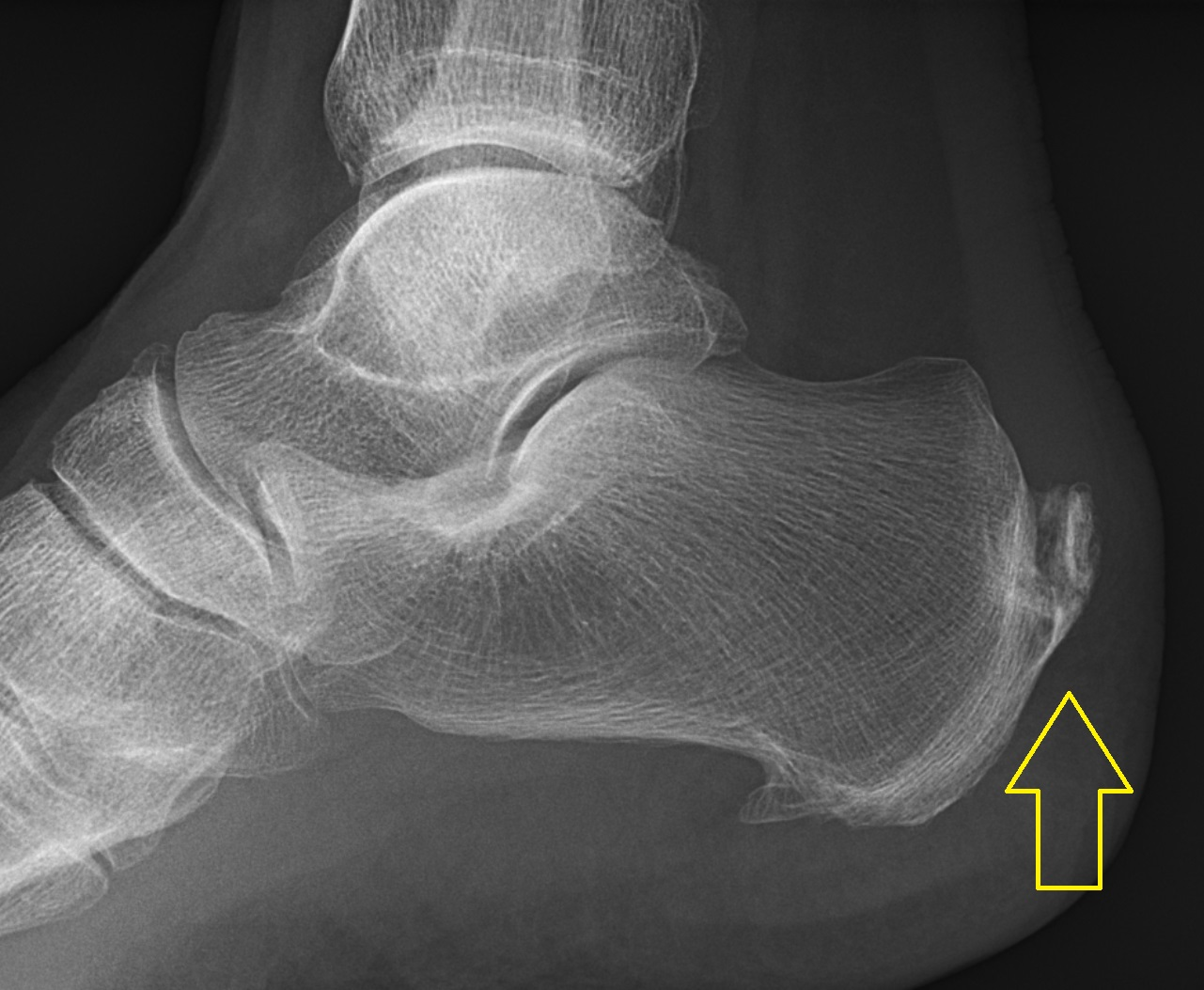
Calcification deposits forming an enthesophyte within the Achilles tendon at its calcaneal insertion. The Achilles tendon is wider than normal, further suggesting inflammation.

Achilles tendinitis is usually diagnosed from a medical history, and physical examination of the tendon. Projectional radiography shows calcification deposits within the tendon at its calcaneal insertion in approximately 60 percent of cases. Magnetic resonance imaging (MRI) can determine the extent of tendon degeneration, and may show differential diagnoses such as bursitis.

== Prevention ==
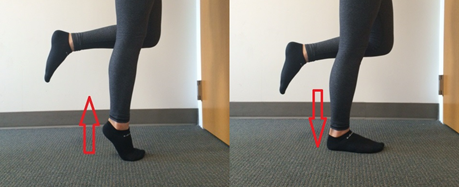
This photo demonstrates a calf raise exercise that can be performed to strengthen two of the major ankle plantar flexor muscles, the gastrocnemius and the soleus. This exercise can be performed with minimal to no equipment. A step can be added under the foot to enhance range of motion and weights can be added to increase the resistance.

Performing consistent physical activity will improve the elasticity and strength of the tendon, which will assist in resisting the forces that are applied.

Stretching before beginning an exercise session is often recommended, however evidence to support this practice is limited. Prevention of recurrence includes following appropriate exercise habits and wearing low-heeled shoes. In the case of incorrect foot alignment, orthotics can be used to properly position the feet. Footwear that is specialized to provide shock-absorption can be utilized to defend the longevity of the tendon. Achilles tendon injuries can be the result of exceeding the tendon's capabilities for loading, therefore it is important to gradually adapt to exercise if someone is inexperienced, sedentary, or is an athlete who is not progressing at a steady rate.

Eccentric strengthening exercises of the gastrocnemius and soleus muscles are utilized to improve the tensile strength of the tendon and lengthen the musculotendinous junction, decreasing the amount of strain experienced with ankle joint movements. This eccentric training method is especially important for individuals with chronic Achilles tendinosis which is classified as the degeneration of collagen fibers.

== Treatment ==
Treatment typically involves rest, ice, non-steroidal antiinflammatory agents (NSAIDs), and physical therapy. A heel lift or orthotics may also be helpful, but evidence for either is limited. Foam rolling may increase range of motion, but there is only weak evidence for the direct treatment of stiffness. Other treatments include:

- An eccentric exercise routine, such as Alfredson's heel-drop program, designed to strengthen the tendon.
- Application of a boot or cast.

Heavy slow resistance training has also shown comparable effectiveness and may improve tendon structure and adherence. Modern rehabilitation emphasizes progressive load management rather than complete rest, as controlled loading promotes tendon remodeling through improved collagen alignment and increased load tolerance.

While stretching may be included, strengthening exercises are prioritized over passive interventions. Pain-monitoring models are often used to guide exercise intensity, allowing patients to continue rehabilitation within tolerable pain levels without negatively impacting recovery.

=== Injections ===
The evidence to support injection therapies is poor.

- This includes corticosteroid injections. These can also increase the risk of tendon rupture.
- Autologous blood injections – results have not been highly encouraging and there is little evidence for their use.
- Stem-cell injection might be beneficial for achilles tendon pathologies that enhance healing.

=== Procedures ===
Tentative evidence supports the use of extracorporeal shockwave therapy.

== Epidemiology ==
The prevalence of Achilles tendinitis varies among different ages and groups of people. Achilles tendinitis is most commonly found in individuals aged 30–40. Runners are susceptible, as well as anyone participating in sports, and men aged 30–39.

Risk factors include participating in a sport or activity that involves running, jumping, bounding, and change of speed. Although Achilles tendinitis is mostly likely to occur in runners, it also is more likely in participants in basketball, volleyball, dancing, gymnastics and other athletic activities. Other risk factors include gender, age, improper stretching, and overuse. Another risk factor is any congenital condition in which an individual's legs rotate abnormally, which in turn causes the lower extremities to overstretch and contract; this puts stress on the Achilles tendon and will eventually cause Achilles tendinitis.
