= Achilles tendon =

Tendon at the back of the lower leg

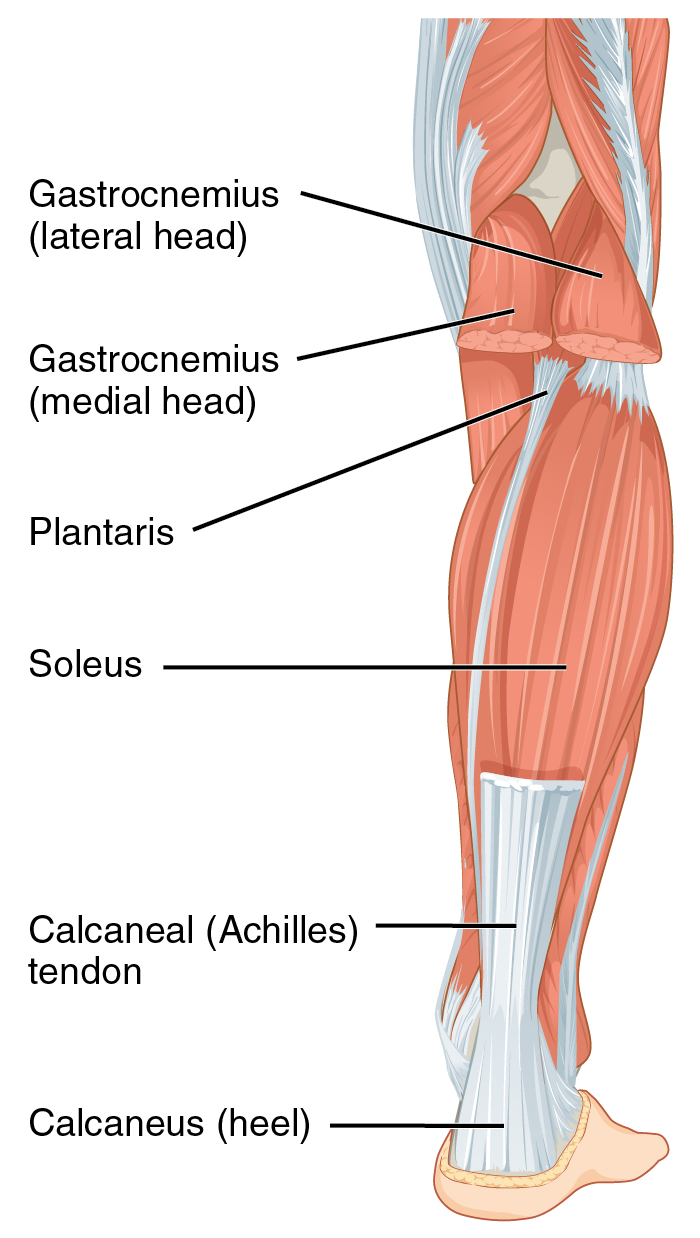
- The Achilles tendon or calcaneal tendon is attached to the gastrocnemius and soleus muscles.

Details
- Location: Back of the lower leg

Identifiers
- Latin: tendo calcaneus, tendo Achillis
- MeSH: D000125
- TA98: A04.7.02.048
- TA2: 2662
- FMA: 51061

The Achilles tendon, or the heel cord, also known as the calcaneal tendon, is a tendon at the back of the lower leg, and is the thickest in the human body. It serves to attach the plantaris, gastrocnemius (calf) and soleus muscles to the calcaneus (heel) bone. These muscles, acting via the tendon, cause plantar flexion of the foot at the ankle joint, and (except the soleus) flexion at the knee.

Abnormalities of the Achilles tendon include inflammation (Achilles tendinitis), degeneration, rupture, and becoming embedded with cholesterol deposits (xanthomas).

The Achilles tendon was named in 1693 after the Greek hero Achilles.

== History ==
The oldest known record of the tendon being named after Achilles was written in 1693 by the Flemish anatomist Philip Verheyen. In his widely used text Corporis Humani Anatomia he described the tendon's location and said that it was commonly called "the cord of Achilles." The tendon has been described as early as the time of Hippocrates, who described it as the "tendo magnus" (Latin for "great tendon") and by subsequent anatomists prior to Verheyen as "chorda Hippocratis" (Latin for "Hippocrates' string").

Verheyen referred to the mythological account of Achilles being held by the heel by his mother Thetis when she dipped him in the River Styx as a baby to render his body invulnerable. As the heel by which she held him was not touched by the water, it was his one vulnerable spot (hence the expression "Achilles' heel") and he was eventually killed by a poison dart to the heel. The name thus also refers to the particularly disabling and painful effect of an injury to this tendon. The first closed rupture was described by Ambroise Pare in the sixteenth century.

The Achilles tendon is also known as the "tendo calcaneus" (Latin for "calcaneal tendon"). Because eponyms (names relating to people) have no relationship to the subject matter, most anatomical eponyms also have scientifically descriptive terms. The term calcaneal comes from the Latin calcaneum, meaning heel.

== Structure ==
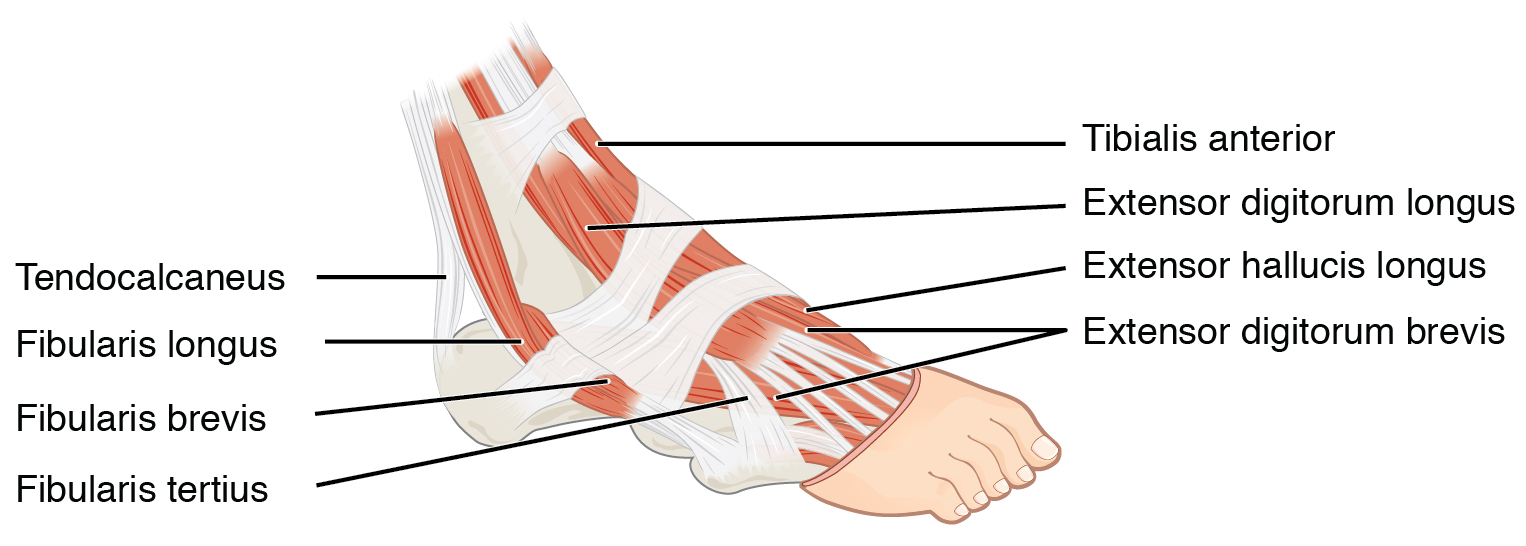
The Achilles tendon, tendo calcaneus attaches distally to the calcaneual tuberosity, and arises superiorly from the triceps surae complex of the gastrocnemius and soleus muscles.

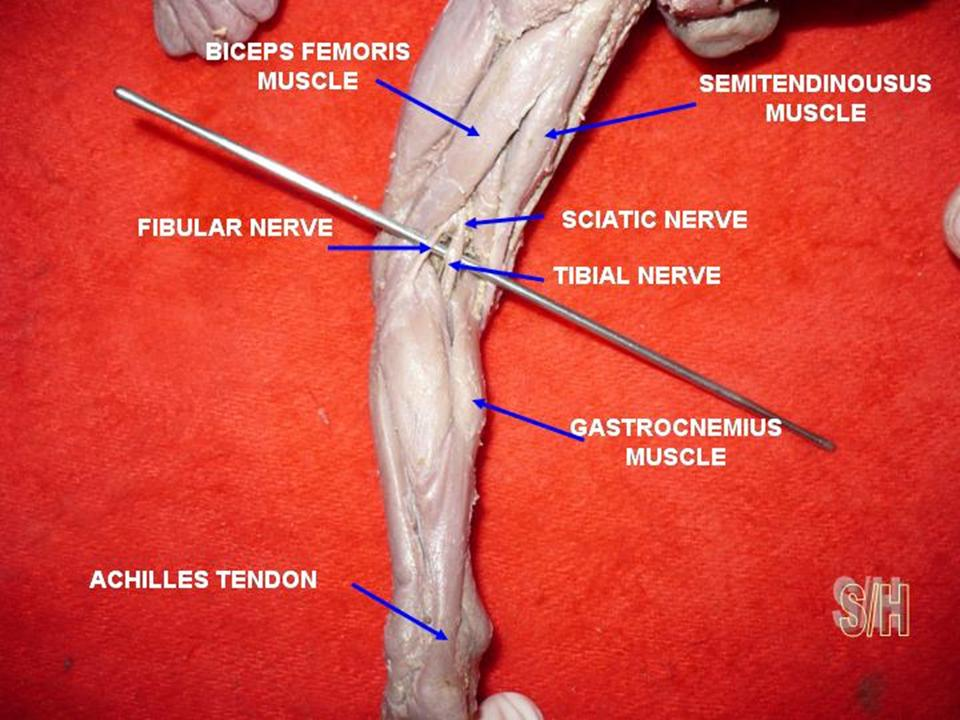
Achilles tendon of foetus

The Achilles tendon connects muscle to bone, like other tendons, and is located at the back of the lower leg. The Achilles tendon connects the gastrocnemius and soleus muscles to the calcaneal tuberosity on the calcaneus (heel bone). The tendon begins near the middle of the calf, and receives muscle fibers on its inner surface, particularly from the soleus muscle, almost to its lower end. Gradually thinning below, it inserts into the middle part of the back of the calcaneus bone. The tendon spreads out somewhat at its lower end so that its narrowest part is about 4 cm (1.6 in) above its insertion.

The tendon is covered by the fascia and skin, and stands out prominently behind the bone; the gap is filled up with areolar and adipose tissue. A bursa (Achilles bursa) lies between the tendon and the upper part of the calcaneus. It is about 15 centimetres (6 in) long.

Along the side of the muscle, and superficial to it, is the small saphenous vein. The sural nerve accompanies the small saphenous vein as it descends in the posterior leg, traveling inferolateral to it as it crosses the lateral border of the Achilles tendon. The tendon is the thickest tendon in the human body. It can receive a load stress 3.9 times body weight during walking and 7.7 times body weight when running.

The blood supply to the Achilles tendon is poor, and mostly via a recurrent branch of the posterior tibial artery, and some through arterial branches passing through surrounding muscles.

== Function ==
Acting via the Achilles tendon, the gastrocnemius and soleus muscles cause plantar flexion of the foot at the ankle. This action brings the sole of the foot closer to the back of the leg. The gastrocnemius also flexes the leg at the knee. Both muscles are innervated by the tibial nerve. Because the fibres of the tendon spiral about 90 degrees, fibres from the gastrocnemius tend to attach to the outer part of the bone, whereas fibres from the soleus tend to attach closer to the midline.

Vibration of the tendon without vision has a major impact on postural orientation. Vibration of the tendon causes movement backwards and the illusion of a forward body tilt in standing subjects. This is because vibrations stimulate muscle spindles in the calf muscles. The muscle spindles alert the brain that the body is moving forward, so the central nervous system compensates by moving the body backwards.

== Clinical significance ==
=== Inflammation ===
Inflammation of the Achilles tendon is called Achilles tendinitis. Achilles tendinosis is the soreness or stiffness of the tendon, particularly worse when exercising, and generally due to overuse. The most common symptoms are sharp achy pain and swelling around the affected tendon. The pain is typically worse at the start of exercise and decreases thereafter. Stiffness of the ankle may also be present. Onset is generally gradual.

It commonly occurs as a result of overuse such as running. Other risk factors include trauma, a lifestyle that includes little exercise, high-heel shoes, rheumatoid arthritis, and medications of the fluoroquinolone or corticosteroid class. Diagnosis is generally based on symptoms and examination.

While stretching and exercises to strengthen the back are often recommended for prevention, evidence to support these measures is poor. Treatment typically involves rest, ice, non-steroidal antiinflammatory agents (NSAIDs), and physical therapy. A heel lift or orthotics may also be helpful. In those in whose symptoms last more than six months despite other treatments, surgery may be considered. Achilles tendinitis is relatively common.

=== Degeneration ===
Achilles tendon degeneration (tendinosis) is typically investigated with either MRI or ultrasound. In both cases, the tendon is thickened, may demonstrate surrounding inflammation by virtue of the presence of paratenonitis, retrocalcaneal or retro-achilles bursitis. Within the tendon, increased blood flow, tendon fibril disorganisation, and partial thickness tears may be identified. Achilles tendinosis frequently involves the mid portion of the tendon but may involve the insertion, which is then known as enthesopathy. Though enthesopathy may be seen in the context of advancing age, it is also associated with arthritis such as gout and the seronegative spondyloarthritides. Achilles tendinosis is a known risk factor for calf muscle tears.

=== Rupture ===
Achilles tendon rupture is when the Achilles tendon breaks. Symptoms include the sudden onset of sharp pain in the heel. A snapping sound may be heard as the tendon breaks and walking becomes difficult.

Rupture typically occurs as a result of a sudden bending up of the foot when the calf muscle is engaged, direct trauma, or long-standing tendonitis. Other risk factors include the use of fluoroquinolones, a significant change in exercise, rheumatoid arthritis, gout, or corticosteroid use. Diagnosis is typically based on symptoms and examination and supported by medical imaging. Achilles tendon rupture occurs in about 1 per 10,000 people per year. Males are more commonly affected than females. People in their 30s to 50s are most commonly affected.

Prevention may include stretching before activity. Treatment may be by surgery or casting with the toes somewhat pointed down. Relatively rapid return to weight bearing (within 4 weeks) appears acceptable. The risk of re-rupture is about 25% with casting. If appropriate treatment does not occur within 4 weeks of the injury outcomes suffer.

=== Xanthomas ===
Tendon xanthomas are cholesterol deposits that commonly develop in the Achilles tendon of people with lipid metabolism disorders such as familial hypercholesterolemia.

=== Neurological exam ===
The Achilles tendon is often tested as part of a neurological examination. In this examination, the tendon is hit with a tendon hammer. This tests the S1 and S2 spinal nerves: a normal response is plantar flexion (downward movement) of the foot.

Level or portion of tendon affected:

- Paratendinopathy: The inflammation of a connective tissue sleeve which surrounds the tendon and protects it from friction, irritation, and repeated trauma
- Insertional: Eminently overuse-injury which frequently occurs in running and jumping athletes. Patients affected by insertional Achilles tendinopathy complain of pain on the posterior aspect of the heel and may have morning stiffness, swelling with activity and tenderness at the tendon insertion level. If this condition becomes chronic, calcific deposits at the Achilles insertional level may be developed (due to microfractures and healing of the osteotendinous union) which can degenerate, if it persists over time, in the abnormal bony prominence on the posterior aspect of heel, condition known as Haglund deformity, which can be painful and difficult close-shoes fitting due to friction and irritation.
- Mid-portion: Occurs approximately 2–7 cm proximal from the Achilles insertion into the calcaneus. Characterized by a combination of pain and swelling at this level. It has associated a remarkable impaired performance.

== Other animals ==
The Achilles tendon is short or absent in great apes, but long in arboreal gibbons and humans. It provides elastic energy storage in hopping, walking, and running. Computer models suggest this energy storage Achilles tendon increases top running speed by >80% and reduces running costs by more than 75%. It has been suggested that the "absence of a well-developed Achilles tendon in the nonhuman African apes would preclude them from effective running, both at high speeds and over extended distances."

== See also ==
- Heel lifts
- Kager's fat pad
