= Deep fascia =

Connective tissue around muscle groups

Details

Identifiers
- Latin: fascia profunda

Deep fascia (or investing fascia) is a fascia, a layer of dense connective tissue that can surround individual muscles and groups of muscles to separate into fascial compartments.

This fibrous connective tissue interpenetrates and surrounds the muscles, bones, nerves, and blood vessels of the body. It provides connection and communication in the form of aponeuroses, ligaments, tendons, retinacula, joint capsules, and septa. The deep fasciae envelop all bone (periosteum and endosteum); cartilage (perichondrium), and blood vessels (tunica externa) and become specialized in muscles (epimysium, perimysium, and endomysium) and nerves (epineurium, perineurium, and endoneurium). The high density of collagen fibers gives the deep fascia its strength and integrity. The amount of elastin fiber determines how much extensibility and resilience it will have.

== Examples ==
Examples include:

- Fascia lata
- Deep fascia of leg
- Brachial fascia
- Buck's fascia

== Fascial dynamics ==
Deep fascia is less extensible than superficial fascia. It is essentially avascular, but is richly innervated with sensory receptors that report the presence of pain (nociceptors); change in movement (proprioceptors); change in pressure and vibration (mechanoreceptors); change in the chemical milieu (chemoreceptors); and fluctuation in temperature (thermoreceptors). Deep fascia is able to respond to sensory input by contracting; by relaxing; or by adding, reducing, or changing its composition through the process of fascial remodeling.

Fascia may be able to contract due to the activity of myofibroblasts which may play a role in wound healing.

The deep fascia can also relax. By monitoring changes in muscular tension, joint position, rate of movement, pressure, and vibration, mechanoreceptors in the deep fascia are capable of initiating relaxation. Deep fascia can relax rapidly in response to sudden muscular overload or rapid movements. Golgi tendon organs operate as a feedback mechanism by causing myofascial relaxation before muscle force becomes so great that tendons might be torn. Pacinian corpuscles sense changes in pressure and vibration to monitor the rate of acceleration of movement. They will initiate a sudden relaxatory response if movement happens too fast. Deep fascia can also relax slowly as some mechanoreceptors respond to changes over longer timescales. Unlike the Golgi tendon organs, Golgi receptors report joint position independent of muscle contraction. This helps the body to know where the bones are at any given moment. Ruffini endings respond to regular stretching and to slow sustained pressure. In addition to initiating fascial relaxation, they contribute to full-body relaxation by inhibiting sympathetic activity which slows down heart rate and respiration.

When contraction persists, fascia will respond with the addition of new material. Fibroblasts secrete collagen and other proteins into the extracellular matrix where they bind to existing proteins, making the composition thicker and less extensible. Although this potentiates the tensile strength of the fascia, it can unfortunately restrict the very structures it aims to protect. The pathologies resulting from fascial restrictions range from a mild decrease in joint range of motion to severe fascial binding of muscles, nerves and blood vessels, as in compartment syndrome of the leg. However, if fascial contraction can be interrupted long enough, a reverse form of fascial remodeling occurs. The fascia will normalize its composition and tone and the extra material that was generated by prolonged contraction will be ingested by macrophages within the extracellular matrix.

Like mechanoreceptors, chemoreceptors in deep fascia also have the ability to promote fascial relaxation. We tend to think of relaxation as a good thing, however fascia needs to maintain some degree of tension. This is especially true of ligaments. To maintain joint integrity, they need to provide adequate tension between bony surfaces. If a ligament is too lax, injury becomes more likely. Certain chemicals, including hormones, can influence the composition of the ligaments. An example of this is seen in the menstrual cycle, where hormones are secreted to create changes in the uterine and pelvic floor fascia. The hormones are not site-specific, however, and chemoreceptors in other ligaments of the body can be receptive to them as well. The ligaments of the knee may be one of the areas where this happens, as a significant association between the ovulatory phase of the menstrual cycle and an increased likelihood for an anterior cruciate ligament injury has been demonstrated.

== Art ==
The continuity of the deep fasciae within the human body inspired the artistic expression seen in the Fascial Net Plastination Project, which is prominently displayed at the Body Worlds exhibition in Berlin.
