= Connective tissue =

Type of biological tissue in animals

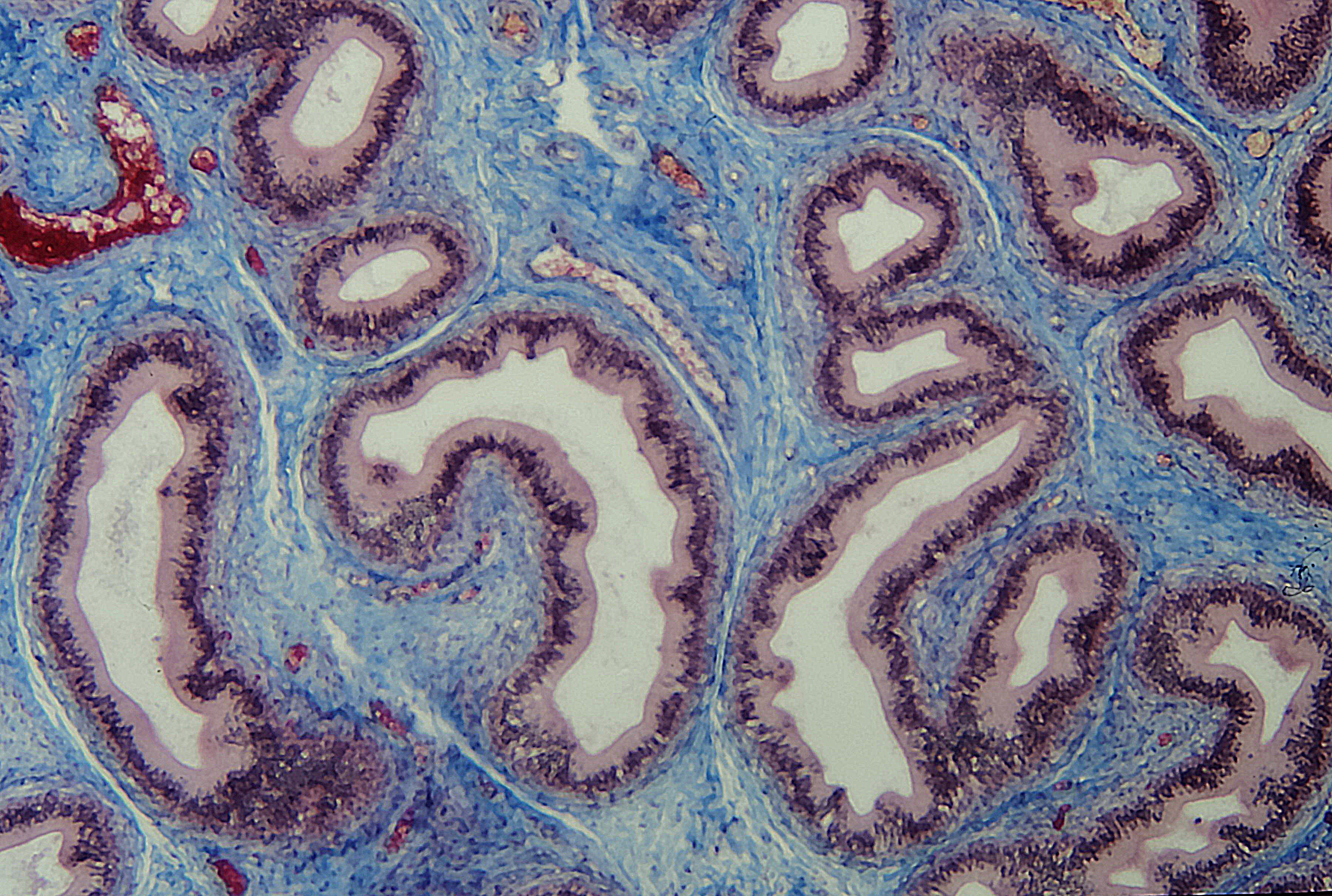
- Section of epididymis. Connective tissue (blue) is seen supporting the epithelium (purple).

Identifiers
- MeSH: D003238
- FMA: 96404

Connective tissue is biological tissue that is found in between other tissues in the body. Most types of connective tissue consists of three main components: elastic and collagen fibers, ground substance, and cells.

It is one of the four primary types of animal tissue along with epithelial tissue, muscle tissue, and nervous tissue. It develops mostly from the mesenchyme, derived from the mesoderm, the middle embryonic germ layer.

The three meninges, membranes that envelop the brain and spinal cord, are composed of connective tissue. Blood and lymph are classed as specialized fluid connective tissues that do not contain fiber. All are immersed in the body water. The cells of connective tissue include fibroblasts, adipocytes, macrophages, mast cells and leukocytes.

The term "connective tissue" (in German, Bindegewebe) was introduced in 1830 by Johannes Peter Müller. The tissue was already recognized as a distinct class in the 18th century.

== Types ==
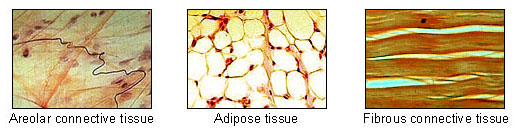

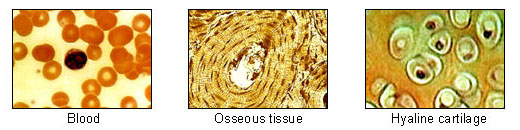

Connective tissue can be broadly classified into connective tissue proper (including loose connective tissue and dense connective tissue) and special connective tissue (including supportive connective tissue and fluid connective tissue).

=== Connective tissue proper ===
Loose and dense connective tissue are distinguished by the ratio of ground substance to fibrous tissue. Loose connective tissue has much more ground substance and a relative lack of fibrous tissue, while the reverse is true of dense connective tissue.

Loose connective tissue includes reticular connective tissue and adipose tissue.

Dense connective tissue is subdivided into dense regular and dense irregular connective tissue. Dense regular connective tissue, found in structures such as tendons and ligaments, is characterized by collagen fibers arranged in an orderly parallel fashion, giving it tensile strength in one direction. Dense irregular connective tissue provides strength in multiple directions by its dense bundles of fibers arranged in all directions.

=== Special connective tissue ===
Special connective tissue consists of supportive connective tissue (comprising bone and cartilage) and fluid connective tissue (comprising blood and lymph). Special connective tissue are a form of fascia, with blood and lymph being known as liquid fascia.

Other kinds of special connective tissues include fibrous, elastic, and lymphoid connective tissues. Fibroareolar tissue is a mix of fibrous and areolar tissue. Fibromuscular tissue is made up of fibrous tissue and muscular tissue.

New vascularised connective tissue that forms in the process of wound healing is termed granulation tissue.

=== Membranes ===
Membranes can be either of connective tissue or epithelial tissue. Connective tissue membranes include the meninges (the three membranes covering the brain and spinal cord) and synovial membranes that line joint cavities. Mucous membranes and serous membranes are epithelial with an underlying layer of loose connective tissue.

== Fibrous types ==
Fiber types found in the extracellular matrix are collagen fibers, elastic fibers, and reticular fibers.

Ground substance is a clear, colorless, and viscous fluid containing glycosaminoglycans and proteoglycans allowing fixation of collagen fibers in intercellular spaces. Examples of non-fibrous connective tissue include adipose tissue (fat) and blood. Adipose tissue gives "mechanical cushioning" to the body, among other functions. Although there is no dense collagen network in adipose tissue, groups of adipose cells are kept together by collagen fibers and collagen sheets in order to keep fat tissue under compression in place (for example, the sole of the foot). Both the ground substance and proteins create the matrix for connective tissue.

Type I collagen is present in many forms of connective tissue, and makes up about 25% of the total protein content of the mammalian body.

Types of fibers
Tissue	Purpose	Components	Location
Collagen fibers	Bind bones and other tissues to each other	Alpha polypeptide chains	Tendon, ligament, skin, cornea, cartilage, bone, blood vessels, gut, intervertebral disc; loose and dense-irregular connective tissue
Elastic fibers	Allow organs to recoil; provide resistance to stretch forces	Elastic microfibril, elastin, fibrillin	Extracellular matrix, walls of large blood vessels, certain ligaments (e.g. ligamenta flava)
Reticular fibers	Form a scaffolding for other cells; provides the stroma for the parenchyma of an organ	Type III collagen	Liver, bone marrow, and lymphatic organs; hematopoietic and lymphatic tissue

== Function ==
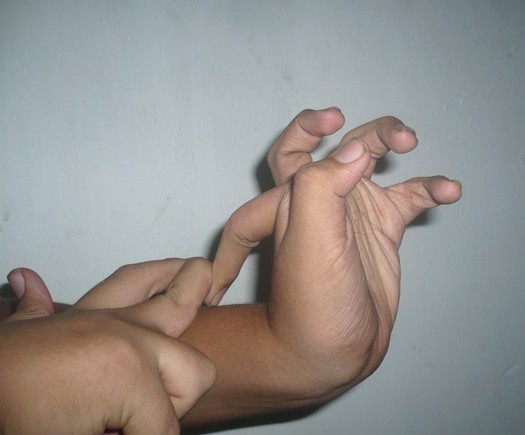
Hypermobility as a result of an inherited connective tissue defect

Connective tissue has a wide variety of functions that depend on the types of cells and the different classes of fibers involved.

Loose and dense irregular connective tissue, formed mainly by fibroblasts and collagen fibers, have an important role in providing a medium for oxygen and nutrients to diffuse from capillaries to cells, and carbon dioxide and waste substances to diffuse from cells back into circulation. They also allow organs to resist stretching and tearing forces.

Dense regular connective tissue, which forms organized structures, is a major functional component of tendons, ligaments and aponeuroses, and is also found in highly specialized organs such as the cornea.

Mesenchyme is a type of connective tissue found in the developing organs of an embryo that is capable of differentiation into all types of mature connective tissue. Another type of relatively undifferentiated connective tissue is the mucous connective tissue known as Wharton's jelly, found inside the umbilical cord. This tissue is no longer present after birth, leaving only scattered mesenchymal cells throughout the body.

Various types of specialized tissues and cells are classified under the spectrum of connective tissue, and are as diverse as brown and white adipose tissue, blood, cartilage and bone. Cells of the immune system—such as macrophages, mast cells, plasma cells, and eosinophils—are found scattered in loose connective tissue, providing the ground for starting inflammatory and immune responses upon the detection of antigens.

== Clinical significance ==
There are many types of connective tissue disorders, such as:

- Connective tissue neoplasms including sarcomas such as hemangiopericytoma and malignant peripheral nerve sheath tumor in nervous tissue.
- Congenital diseases include Marfan syndrome and Ehlers–Danlos syndrome.
- Myxomatous degeneration – a pathological weakening of connective tissue.
- Mixed connective tissue disease – a disease of the autoimmune system, also undifferentiated connective tissue disease.
- Systemic lupus erythematosus (SLE) – a major autoimmune disease of connective tissue
- Scurvy, caused by a deficiency of vitamin C which is necessary for the synthesis of collagen.
- Fibromuscular dysplasia is a disease of the blood vessels that leads to an abnormal growth in the arterial wall.

== See also ==
- Endometrium
- Parametrium
