= Dense irregular connective tissue =

Type of connective tissue in animals

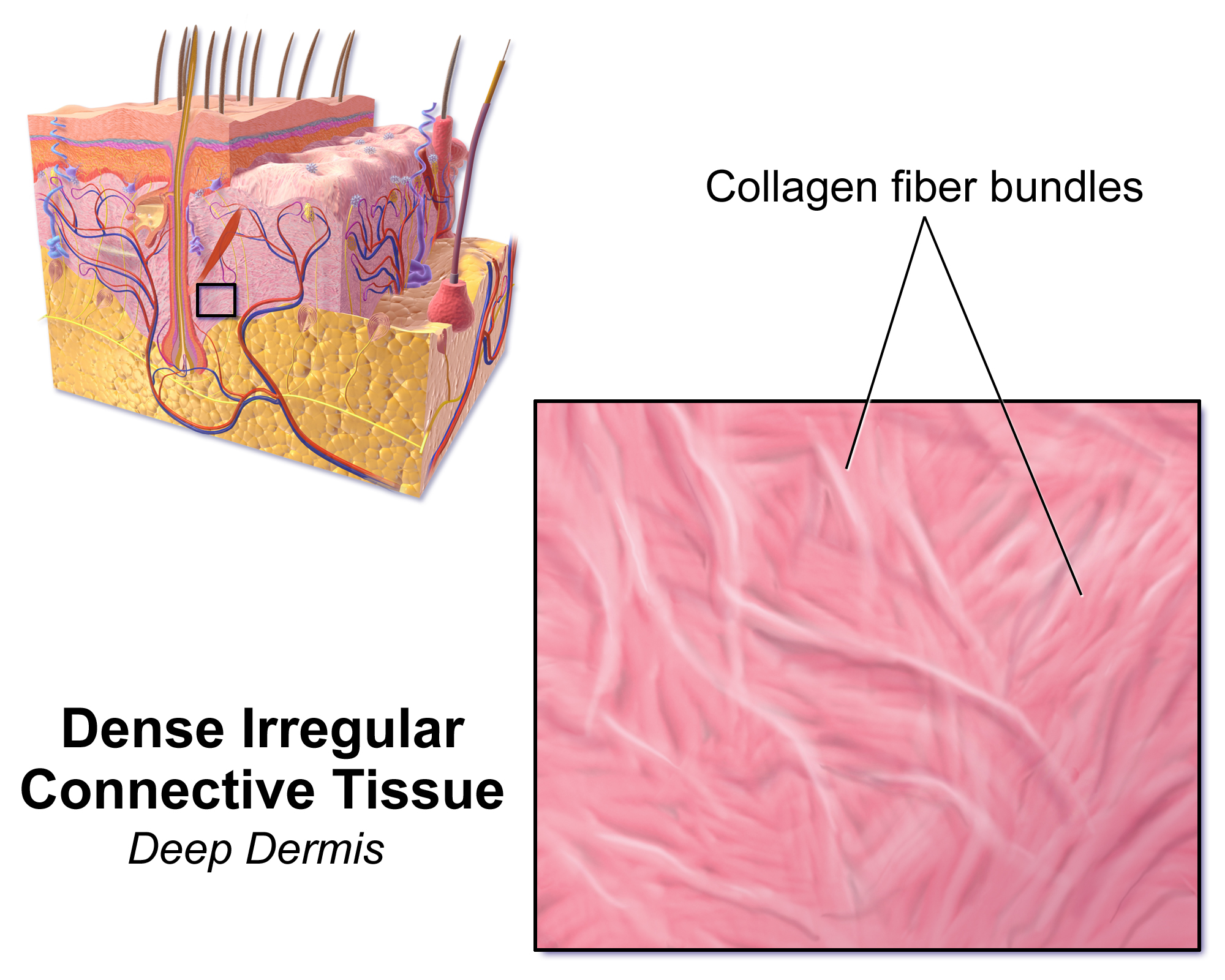
Illustration of dense irregular connective tissue (deep dermis)

Dense irregular connective tissue is a form of dense connective tissue characterized by collagen fibers that appear randomly interwoven instead of forming parallel bundles as in dense regular connective tissue.

Dense irregular connective tissue has less ground substance than loose connective tissue. Fibroblasts are the predominant cell type, scattered sparsely across the tissue.

== Function ==
This type of connective tissue is found mostly in the reticular layer (or deep layer) of the dermis. It is also in the sclera and in the deeper skin layers. Due to a high content of type I collagen, dense irregular connective tissue provides strength, making the skin resistant to tearing by stretching forces from different directions.

Dense irregular connective tissue also makes up submucosa of the digestive tract, lymph nodes, and some types of fascia. Other examples include periosteum and perichondrium of bones, and the tunica albuginea of testis. In the submucosa layer, the fiber bundles course in varying planes allowing the organ to resist excessive stretching and distension.
