= Lecithocera fascitiala =

Scientific classification
- Kingdom: Animalia
- Phylum: Arthropoda
- Clade: Pancrustacea
- Class: Insecta
- Order: Lepidoptera
- Family: Lecithoceridae
- Genus: Lecithocera
- Species: L. fascitiala

Binomial name
- Lecithocera fascitiala Park, 2012

Species of moth in genus Lecithocera

Lecithocera fascitiala is a moth in the family Lecithoceridae. It was described by Kyu-Tek Park in 2012 and is endemic to Papua New Guinea.

The wingspan is 10–11 millimetres (0.39–0.43 in).

== Etymology ==
The species name is derived from Latin fascit (meaning banded) and ala (meaning wing) and refers to the whitish fascia dividing the forewing.
