= Fascial compartment =

Section within the body containing muscles and nerves and surrounded by fascia

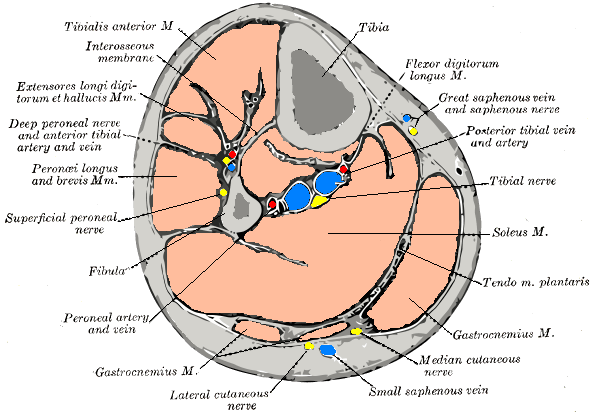
- Cross-section through middle of left leg. (Anterior compartment at upper left; lateral at center left; deep posterior at center; superficial posterior at bottom right.)

Details

Identifiers
- Latin: compartimentum
- TA98: A04.7.01.001
- TA2: 2020
- FMA: 322216

A fascial compartment is a section within the body that contains muscles and nerves and is surrounded by deep fascia. In the human body, the limbs can each be divided into two segments. The upper limb can be divided into the arm and the forearm; their sectional compartments are the fascial compartments of the arm and the fascial compartments of the forearm, which both contain an anterior and a posterior compartment. Likewise, the lower limbs can be divided into two segments: the leg and the thigh, which contain the fascial compartments of the leg and the fascial compartments of the thigh respectively.

Cutting these segments transversely reveals that they are divided into multiple sections named fascial compartments. They are formed by tough connective tissue septa.

These compartments usually have a nerve and blood supply separate from their neighbours. The muscles in each compartment will often all be supplied by the same nerve.

Sometimes the segment is also covered by bone profoundly (as e.g. the brachial fascia). It is distinguished from pharmacokinetic compartment, which is a defined volume of body fluids.

Compartment syndrome is an acute medical problem following injury or surgery in which increased pressure (usually caused by inflammation) occurs within a compartment.
