= Dermis =

Layer of skin between the epidermis and subcutaneous tissues

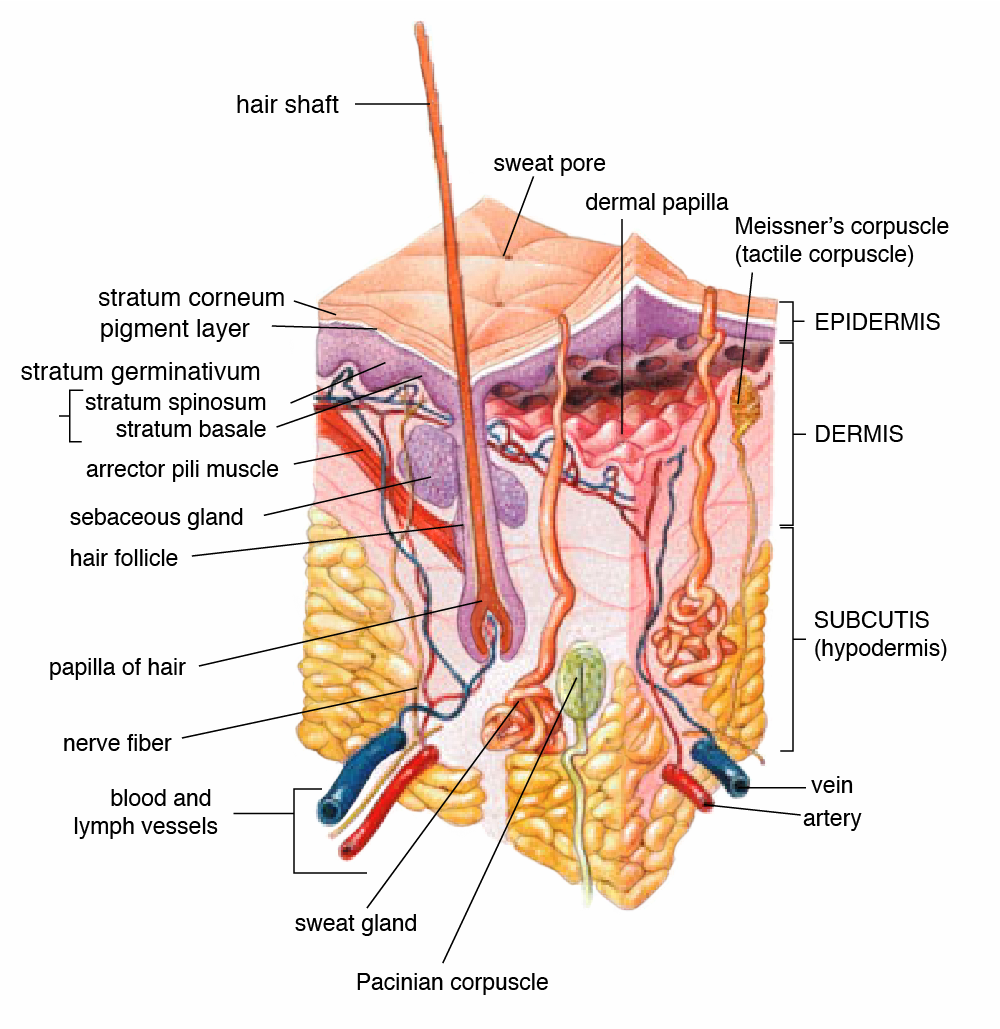
- Cross-section of human skin

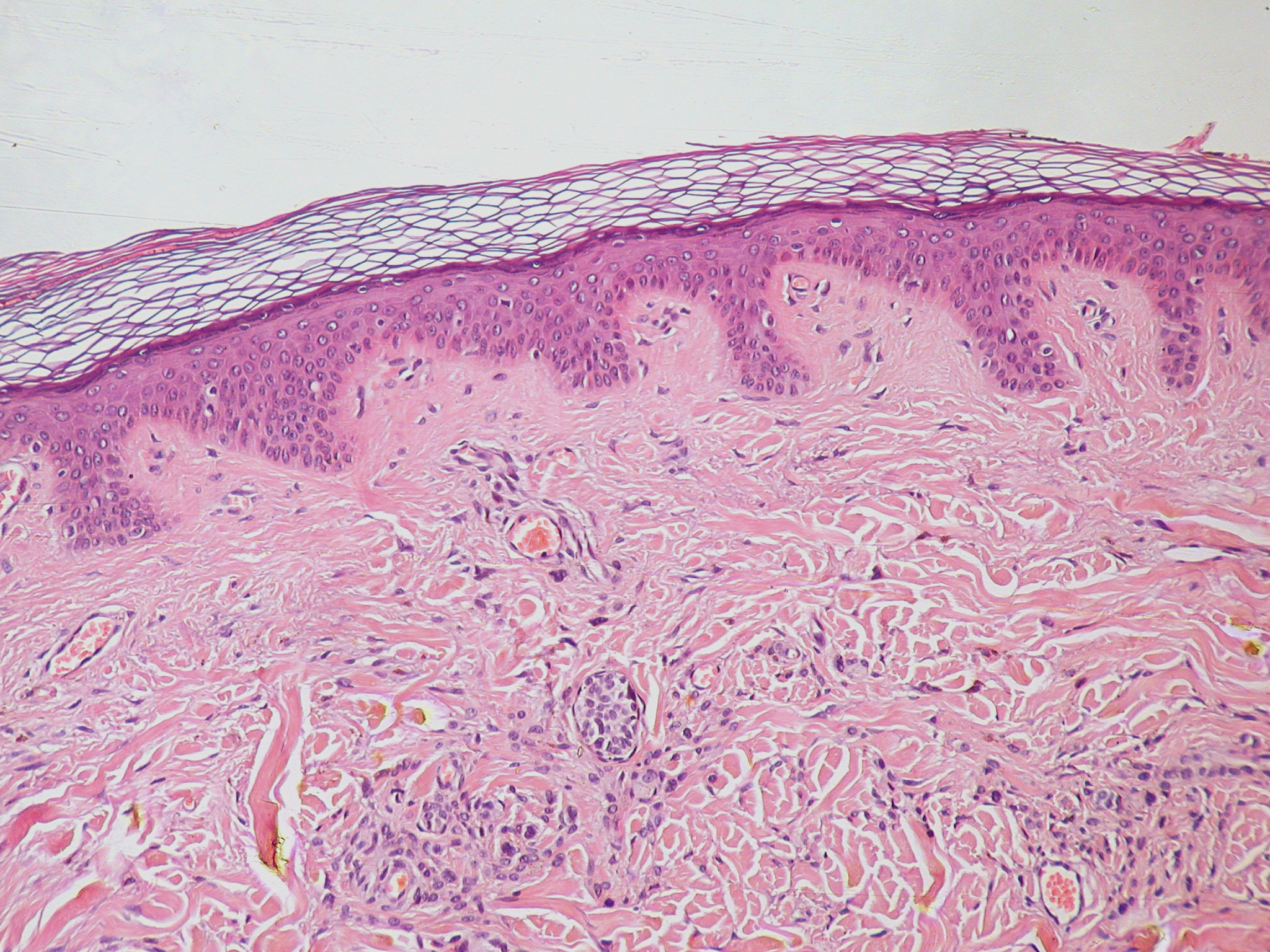
- Cross section of skin under a microscope

Details
- Part of: Skin

Identifiers
- MeSH: D020405
- TA98: A16.0.00.010
- TA2: 7047
- TH: H3.12.00.1.03001
- FMA: 70323

The dermis or corium is a layer of skin between the epidermis (with which it makes up the cutis) and subcutaneous tissues, that primarily consists of dense irregular connective tissue and cushions the body from stress and strain. It is divided into two layers, the superficial area adjacent to the epidermis called the papillary region and a deep thicker area known as the reticular dermis. The dermis is tightly connected to the epidermis through a basement membrane. Structural components of the dermis are collagen, elastic fibers, and extrafibrillar matrix. It also contains mechanoreceptors that provide the sense of touch and thermoreceptors that provide the sense of heat. In addition, hair follicles, sweat glands, sebaceous glands (oil glands), apocrine glands, lymphatic vessels, nerves and blood vessels are present in the dermis. Those blood vessels provide nourishment and waste removal for both dermal and epidermal cells.

== Structure ==
The dermis is composed of three major types of cells: fibroblasts, macrophages, and mast cells.

Apart from these cells, the dermis is also composed of matrix components such as collagen (which provides strength), elastin (which provides elasticity), and extrafibrillar matrix, an extracellular gel-like substance primarily composed of glycosaminoglycans (most notably hyaluronan), proteoglycans, and glycoproteins.

== Layers ==
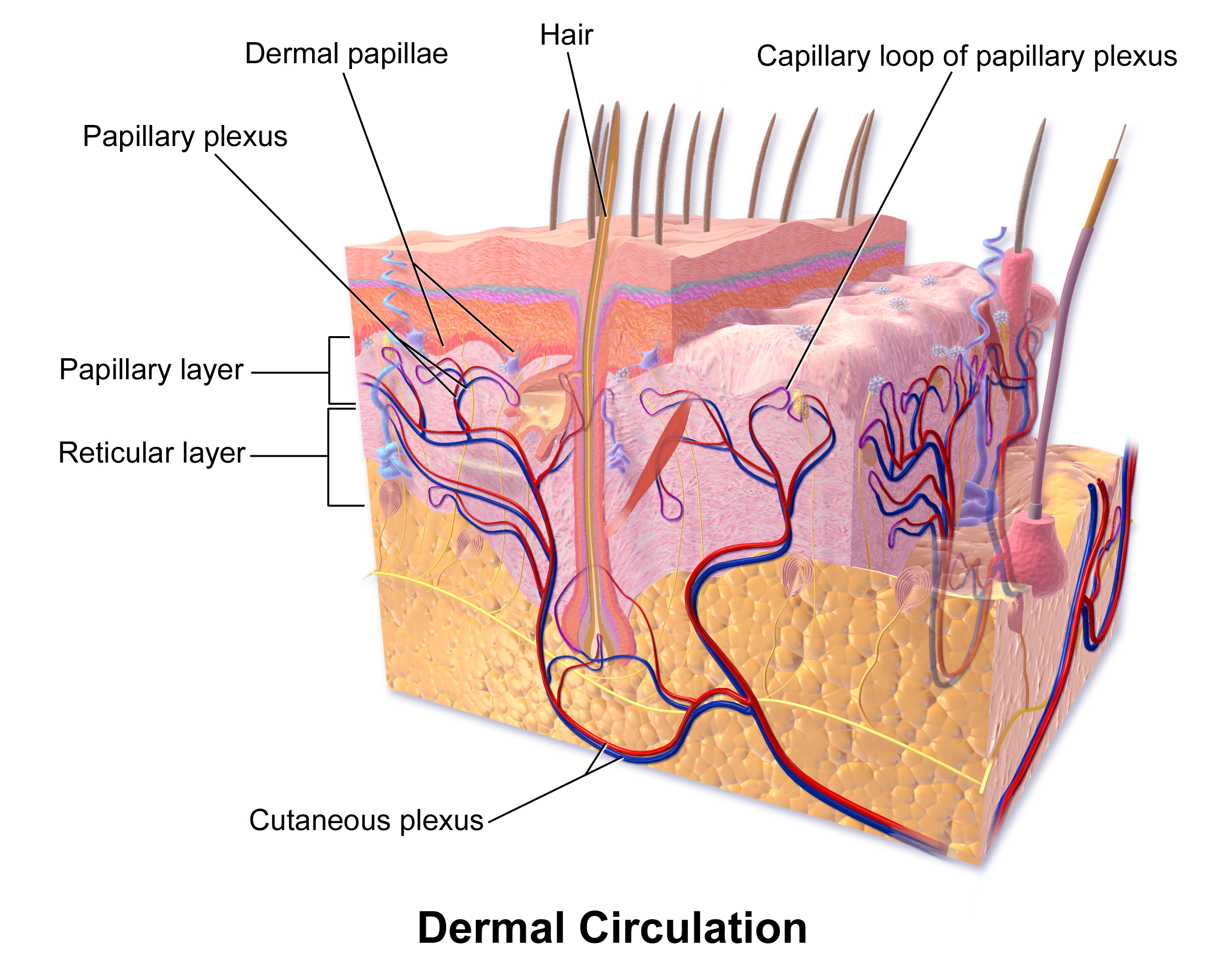
Illustration of dermal circulation and layers

=== Papillary dermis ===
The papillary dermis is the uppermost layer of the dermis. It intertwines with the rete ridges of the epidermis and is composed of fine and loosely arranged collagen fibers. The papillary region is composed of loose areolar connective tissue. It is named for its fingerlike projections called papillae or dermal papillae specifically, that extend toward the epidermis and contain either terminal networks of blood capillaries or tactile Meissner's corpuscles.

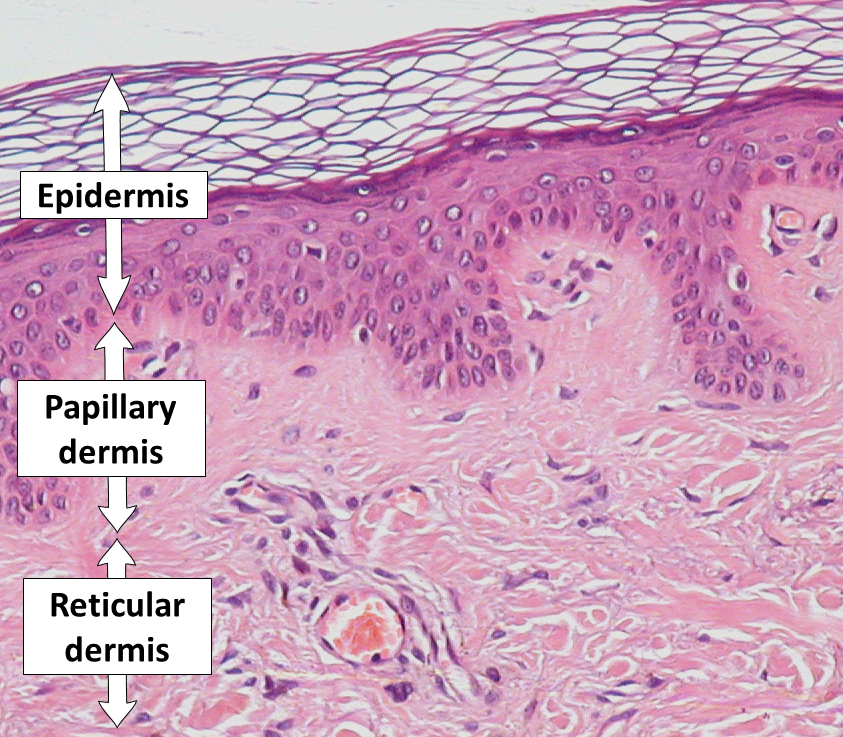
Epidermis, papillary dermis and reticular dermis.

==== Dermal papillae ====
Dermal papillae
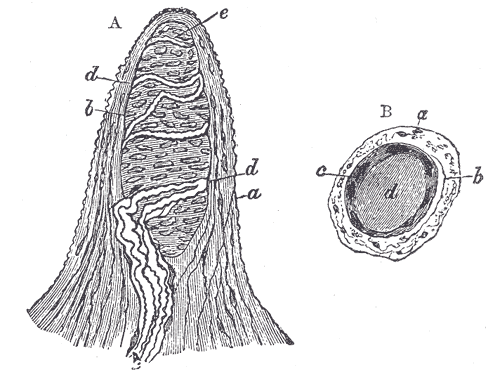
- Papilla of the hand, treated with acetic acid. Magnified 350 times. A. Side view of a papilla of the hand. a. Cortical layer. b. Tactile corpuscle. c. Small nerve of the papilla, with neurolemma. d. Its two nervous fibers running in spiral coils around the tactile corpuscle. e. Apparent termination of one of these fibers. B. Tactile papilla seen from above so as to show its transverse section. a. Cortical layer. b. Nerve fiber. c. Outer layer of the tactile body, with nuclei. d. Clear interior substance.

Details

Identifiers
- Latin: papillae dermis
- MeSH: D020405
- TA98: A16.0.00.010
- TA2: 7047
- TH: H3.12.00.1.03001
- FMA: 70323

The dermal papillae (DP; singular papilla, diminutive of Latin papula, 'pimple') are small, nipple-like extensions (or interdigitations) of the dermis into the epidermis. At the surface of the skin in hands and feet, they appear as epidermal, papillary or friction ridges (colloquially known as fingerprints). Note that dermal papilla has two meanings referring to separate anatomical features. The dermal papilla of the dermal–epidermal junction should not be confused with the dermal papilla cells at the base of each hair follicle.

The pattern of ridges produced in hands and feet are only partly genetically determined features that are developed before birth, the timing and events around the ridge formation area also contributing. They remain substantially unaltered (except in size) throughout life, and therefore determine the patterns of fingerprints, making them useful in certain functions of personal identification.

The dermal papillae are part of the uppermost layer of the dermis, the papillary dermis, and the ridges they form greatly increase the surface area between the dermis and epidermis. Because the main function of the dermis is to support the epidermis, this greatly increases the exchange of oxygen, nutrients, and waste products between these two layers. Additionally, the increase in the surface area prevents the dermal and epidermal layers from separating by strengthening the junction between them. With age, the papillae tend to flatten and sometimes increase in number.

The skin of the hands and fingers and the feet and toes is known by forensic scientists as friction ridge skin. It is known by anatomists as thick skin, volar skin or hairless skin. It has raised ridges, a thicker and more complex epidermis, increased sensory abilities, and the absence of hair and sebaceous glands. The ridges increase friction for improved grasping.

In mucous membranes, the equivalent structures to dermal papillae are generally termed "connective tissue papillae", which interdigitate with the rete pegs of the superficial epithelium. Dermal papillae are less pronounced in thin skin areas.

=== Reticular dermis ===
The reticular dermis is the lower layer of the dermis, found under the papillary dermis, composed of dense irregular connective tissue featuring densely-packed collagen fibers. It is the primary location of dermal elastic fibers.

The reticular region is usually much thicker than the overlying papillary dermis. It receives its name from the dense concentration of collagenous, elastic, and reticular fibers that weave throughout it. These protein fibers give the dermis its properties of strength, extensibility, and elasticity. Within the reticular region are the roots of the hair, sebaceous glands, sweat glands, receptors, nails, and blood vessels. The orientation of collagen fibers within the reticular dermis creates lines of tension called Langer's lines, which are of some relevance in surgery and wound healing.

== See also ==
- List of cutaneous conditions
