= Hans-Wilhelm Müller-Wohlfahrt =

German sports physician

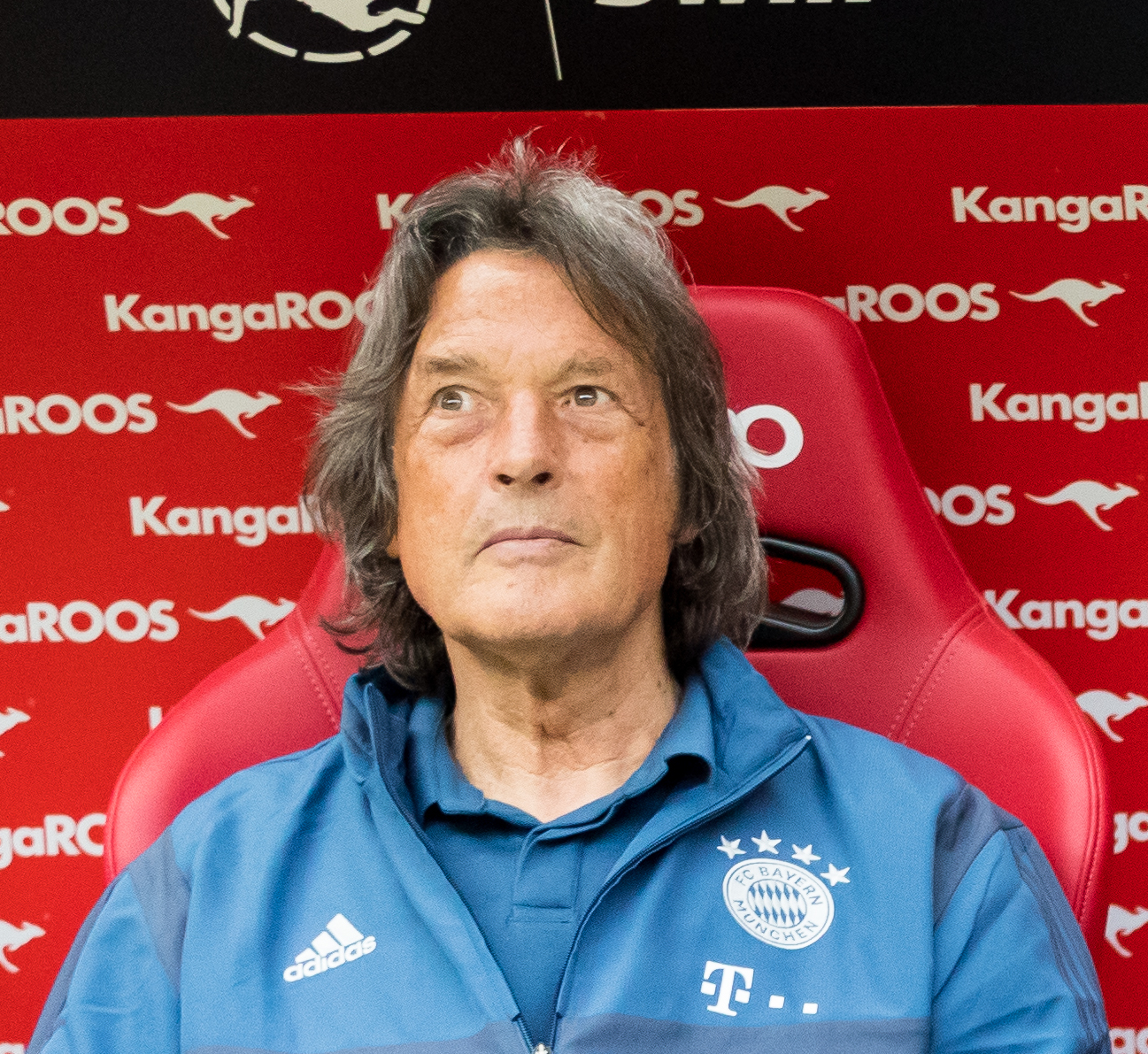
- Hans-Wilhelm Müller-Wohlfahrt in 2019
- Born: 12 August 1942 (age 83); Leerhafe, Wittmund, East Frisia, Germany
- Education: Kiel University, University of Innsbruck
- Occupations: Orthopedist, Sports Physician
- Known for: Doctor for FC Bayern Munich and Germany national football team
- Spouse: Karin Müller-Wohlfahrt
- Children: Maren Müller-Wohlfahrt, Kilian Müller-Wohlfahrt

Dr. Hans-Wilhelm Müller-Wohlfahrt, (born 12 August 1942) in Leerhafe, Wittmund, East Frisia is a German orthopedist and sports physician.

He gained recognition for his roles as Germany's national football team doctor for 23 years (1995–2018) and club doctor of Bayern Munich (1977–2015, 2017–2020).

== Early life and education ==
Müller-Wohlfahrt was born as the third son of pastor Diedrich Müller and his wife Elisabeth, née Pape, in Leerhafe, which is today part of Wittmund, East Frisia. He graduated from Mariengymnasium in Jever in March 1963. After serving two years in the Bundeswehr, he studied natural sciences and then medicine at Kiel University and University of Innsbruck. He earned his doctorate in cardiology in April 1972 with a study supervised by Paul Heintzen.

== Personal life ==
Müller-Wohlfahrt is married to Karin Müller-Wohlfahrt and lives in the Lehel district of Munich. His daughter Maren gained media attention through her relationship with Lothar Matthäus, and his son Kilian is also a doctor who briefly worked for FC Bayern Munich and became known through his relationship with model Lena Gercke.

== Career ==
Müller-Wohlfahrt began his medical career at the orthopedics clinic of the Rudolf-Virchow-Krankenhaus in Berlin under Fritz Hofmeister. He served as the team doctor for Hertha BSC from 1975 to 1977 before joining FC Bayern Munich in April 1977. In 1995, he became the doctor for the Germany national football team, a position he held until 2018.

In November 2008, Müller-Wohlfahrt took a temporary leave from his duties but returned to the Bayern Munich bench after the dismissal of coach Jürgen Klinsmann in April 2009. On 16 April 2015, Müller-Wohlfahrt and his medical team ended their cooperation with Bayern Munich, citing a damaged trust relationship with then-coach Pep Guardiola. Initially, he resigned after he and his medical staff were blamed for a 3–1 loss to Porto in a UEFA Champions League match during Guardiola's tenure. However, he rejoined Bayern Munich after the reappointment of Jupp Heynckes as head coach.

Having already resigned from his position at the Germany national football team in 2018, his second and final resignation at Bayern Munich also came into effect on 30 June 2020

== Business Ventures ==
In 1998, Hans-Wilhelm Müller-Wohlfahrt co-founded [formula] Müller-Wohlfahrt Health & Fitness AG. This company focuses on developing and marketing over-the-counter medications and dietary supplements under the brand names PROFELAN and OXANO. Despite its innovative products and Müller-Wohlfahrt's prominence, the company has faced financial challenges. According to the most recent available balance sheet from 2011, the company was over-indebted by almost 800,000 euros. Nonetheless, Müller-Wohlfahrt continues to serve as the chairman of the supervisory board, guiding the company with his extensive experience in sports medicine.

In April 2007, Müller-Wohlfahrt co-founded MW Orthopedic Centre GmbH, establishing a center for sports medicine in an exclusive location in Munich. Despite its prime location and Müller-Wohlfahrt's reputation, the company faced financial difficulties from the outset. By 2010, the company had accumulated liabilities of approximately eight million euros and was over-indebted by nearly two million euros. In April 2010, Dietmar Hopp's private company acquired all the shares of MW Orthopedic Centre GmbH, and since then, Müller-Wohlfahrt has continued to practice there as a tenant, lending his name to the facility.

== Medical Practises ==
=== Controversial Treatments ===
Müller-Wohlfahrt is known for his controversial treatments, including the use of Hyalart (sodium hyaluronate), Actovegin (a hemodialysate from calf's blood), and Myo-Melcain (Procaine in a honey solution). Despite criticism, he remains an internationally respected expert in sports injuries, particularly knee and tendon issues. His use of homeopathic medicine and views on dietary supplements are also controversial among colleagues.

=== Clinical Pioneer Award ===
In 2017, Dr. Hans-Wilhelm Müller-Wohlfahrt was honored with the 'Clinical Pioneer Award' by the Fascia Research Society at the 'Connective Tissue in Sports Medicine' Congress. The award was presented to him by Prof. Jürgen Steinacker, Prof. Dr. Robert Schleip, and Prof. Thomas W. Findley. This recognition was given for his pioneering contributions to sports medicine and fascia research.

=== Notable Patients ===
He has treated many footballers and athletes over the years, including:

- In the late 1990s, he helped cure Michael Owen's hamstring problems in time to play at the Euro 2000 tournament. He also helped Owen's Liverpool and England colleague, Steven Gerrard and Harry Kewell.
- In the early 2000s, he treated Jonathan Woodgate, Kelly Holmes, and Maurice Greene.
- In 2006, he began treating Usain Bolt, who would later dedicate his 100m sprint gold medal at the 2016 Olympics in Rio to Müller-Wohlfahrt.
- In the late 2000s, he treated cricketers Darren Gough and Alex Tudor, as well as golfer José María Olazábal, who was able to win at Augusta again in 1999 after suffering from rheumatoid arthritis.
- In 2009, he was helping Akpo Sodje recover from a longstanding hamstring problem and treated St Johnstone F.C. striker Peter MacDonald with goat's blood injections for a recurring hamstring problem.
- In 2010, he treated Bono (singer for U2) and Usain Bolt for severe back injuries.
- In 2012, he repaired the hamstring of Dylan Grimes of the AFL club Richmond Tigers.
- In 2019, he worked on Collingwood Magpie AFL player Jordan De Goey to help resolve his hamstring injury in time for the AFL Grand Final.
- In 2024, Christian McCaffrey of the National Football League's San Francisco 49ers sought his help with an Achilles tendon injury.
- In 2025, Auston Matthews of the National Hockey League's Toronto Maple Leafs flew to Germany for assistance with an aggravated upper-body injury.
- Additionally, he treated Australian rules footballers Ben Reid, Max Rooke, and Mark Coughlan for chronic soft tissue injuries. He has also treated professional cyclists, including Stephen Roche.

== Works ==
- Classification of athletic injuries to muscular tissue; Fascia in Sport & Movement, Schleip & Wilke (eds.), ISBN 978-1912085774
- Mensch, beweg dich!, Zabert Sandmann, ISBN 978-3-423-34093-9
- So schützen Sie Ihre Gesundheit, Zabert Sandmann, ISBN 3-932023-52-8
- So gewinnen Sie mehr Lebenskraft, Zabert Sandmann, ISBN 3-89883-037-3
- Verletzt, was tun?, with Hans-Jürgen Montag, ISBN 3-9806973-1-2
- Besser trainieren!, Zabert Sandmann, ISBN 978-3-89883-170-3
