= Connective tissue neoplasm =

- Specialty: Rheumatology, oncology

A connective tissue neoplasm or connective tissue tumor is a neoplasm arising from the tissues of the connective tissue. (Not all tumors in the connective tissue are of the connective tissue.)
