= Heel lift =

Type of shoe insert

- Specialty: Physical therapy

Heel lifts, also known as shoe inserts, are commonly used as therapy for leg-length differences leading to knee, hip, and back pain. They attempt to reduce stress on the Achilles' tendon during healing, and for various rehabilitation uses.

The intent of a heel lift is not to absorb shock or spread pressure on the foot, but to raise one foot in order to shift balance and gait. As such, these products should be firm and not compressible, in order to add a constant amount of height without causing the heel to rub vertically in the shoe.

== Calculation ==
A commonly used formula for calculating the amount lift necessary for short leg syndrome was presented by David Heilig:

$L < [SBU] / [D + C]$

where Duration (D) is

0–10 years = 1 point
10–30 years = 2 points
30+ years = 3 points

SBU is Sacral Base Unleveling (SBU), and L is the amount of Lift required (L).

Compensation (C)> is absent (none) = 0 points
Sidebending and rotation (of the spine) = 1 point
Wedging, facet size changes, endplates with horizontal growths, spurring = 2 points

The maximum lift measure within the shoe (i.e., between the heel and the insole) is ^{1}/_{4} inch, while the maximum lift from the heel to the floor is ^{1}/_{2} inch.
