= Fascial Net Plastination Project =

2018 anatomical research initiative

Fascial Net Plastination Project (FNPP)
- Mission statement: To plastinate and study the human fascial net
- Type of project: Anatomical research project
- Products: Plastinated human fascia specimens
- Location: Berlin, Germany
- Owner: Body Worlds
- Founder: Robert Schleip, Fascia Research Group
- Key people: Gary Carter; Vladimir Chereminskiy; Rachelle Clauson; Rebecca Prat; Robert Schleip; John Sharkey; Carla Stecco; Jaap van der Wal; Rurik von Hagens; Angelina Whalley
- Established: 2018
- Status: Active
- Website: bodyworlds.com/FREIA/

The Fascial Net Plastination Project is an anatomical research initiative established in 2018 aimed at plastinating and studying the human fascial network. The collaboration was initiated by Robert Schleip as a joint effort between Body Worlds, Fascia Research Group, and the Fascia Research Society. The project focuses on preserving the fascia, a complex connective tissue network that plays a crucial role in the human body's structure and function.

One outcome of this three-year project is the creation of the world's first 3-D representation of the fascial network of a whole human body, named FR:EIA (Fascia Revealed: Educating Interconnected Anatomy), which is on display at the Body Worlds museum in Berlin, Germany.

== Origination and objectives ==
The project was conceived to provide a comprehensive and tangible understanding of the fascial system through plastination. This technique, developed by Gunther von Hagens, involves replacing water and fat in biological tissues with polymers to create durable, lifelike specimens. The specific goals of the project include:

1. Enhancing Educational Outreach: By creating detailed and durable plastinated specimens of the fascial net, the project aims to elevate the anatomical education of medical professionals and the general public.
2. Advancing Research: Detailed anatomical studies of plastinated fascia specimens facilitate a deeper understanding of its structure and function.
3. Public Exhibitions: Specimens from the project are displayed in Body Worlds exhibitions worldwide, providing an unprecedented view of the human fascial system.

== Background ==
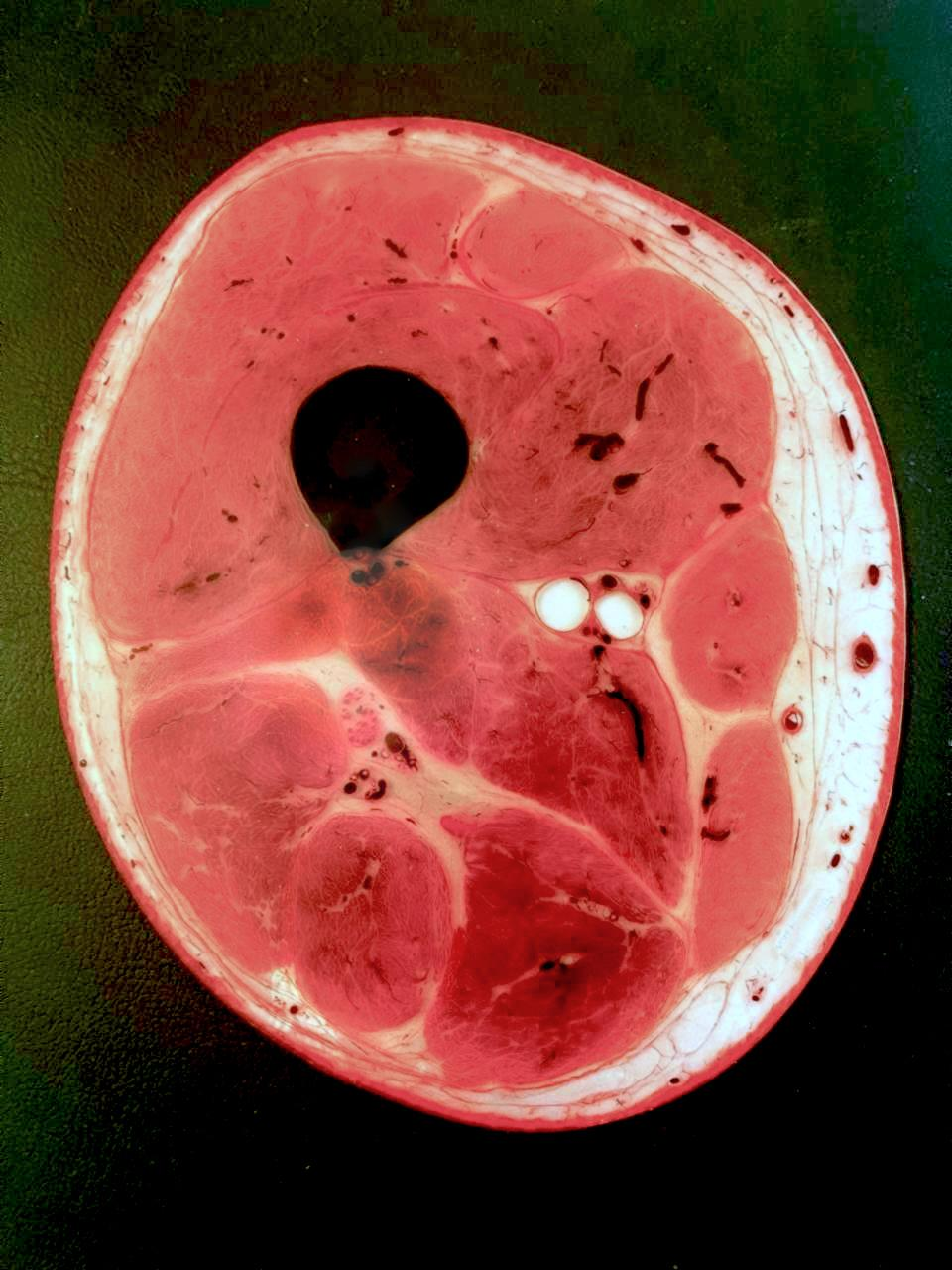
Cross-sectional slice from a plastinated human thigh

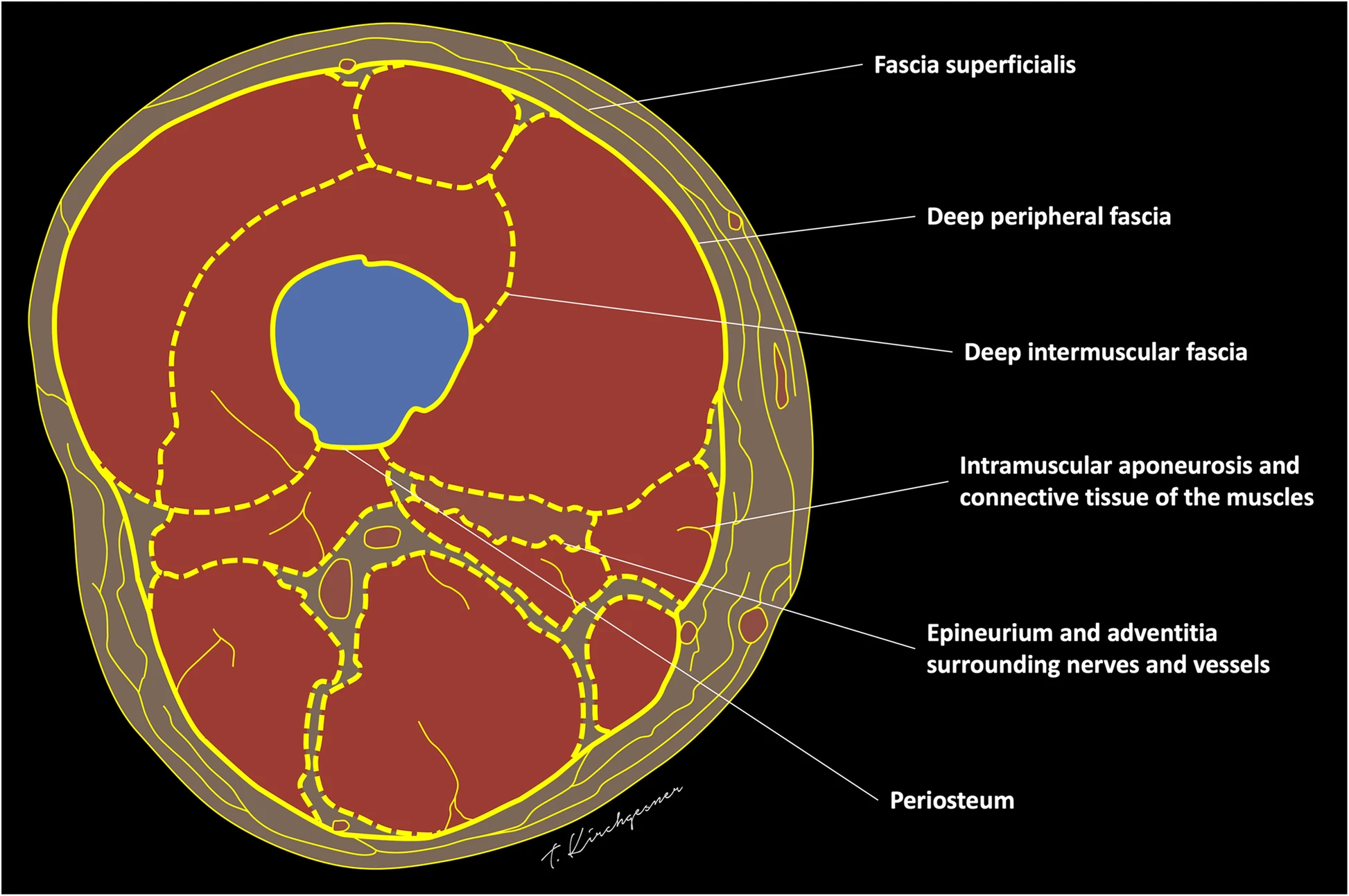
Schematic transverse section of the thigh illustrating its fascial anatomy

The fascia is a band or sheet of connective tissue, primarily collagen, that supports and surrounds muscles, bones, nerves, and blood vessels. It extends from head to toe without interruption. Recent studies have highlighted the fascia's significance in movement, stability, and overall bodily function, debunking the previous notion of fascia being merely passive tissue.

== Overview ==
In January 2018, the Fascia Research Society, Somatics Academy, the Plastinarium, and Body Worlds embarked on a collaborative journey to create the world's first 3D representation of the fascial network of a whole human body via plastination. Directed by fascia research scientist Robert Schleip, professor of anatomy Carla Stecco, with the assistance of clinical anatomist John Sharkey and support from several other experts, the project is taking place in Guben, Germany, at the renowned Plastinarium under the direction of Dr. Vladimir Chereminskiy.

The project was supported by a Scientific Advisory Board consisting of Vladimir Chereminskiy, Gil Hedley, Thomas W. Myers, John Sharkey, Robert Schleip, Carla Stecco, Jaap Van der Wal, Gunther von Hagens, and Angelina Whalley.

The first ten plastinated specimens from this project, demonstrating fascial architecture of different selected body regions from this project were exhibited for the first time at the Fifth International Fascia Research Congress in Berlin, Germany, on November 14 and 15, 2018, in an exhibition titled "Fascia in a NEW LIGHT: The Exhibition."

=== Phase one ===
The first phase began in January 2018 with a team of scientists, academics, and anatomy enthusiasts. Several formalin-fixed specimens were dissected to illustrate fascial structures from superficial fascia/subcutaneous tissues, including the abdomen, arm, and lower limb. Additionally, several deep fascia structures were dissected, such as the fascia lata, a 5 cm cross-section of the thigh, a 5 cm cross-section of the leg, the fibrous pericardium with the respiratory diaphragm, and the lumbodorsal fascia.

These specimens went through the first two stages of plastination; soaking in high and low temperature baths to replace water with acetone and dissolve fats, followed by another bath to replace acetone with plastic polymer. These stages typically take up to six months depending on the size of the specimen.

=== Phase two ===
In June 2018, the team returned to Guben to position the specimens. Now infused with silicone rubber, the specimens were still supple and could be positioned back into their original shapes. The team created forms to support the soft specimens so they could undergo the final stage of gas curing to harden them into durable plastinates ready for exhibition.

During this phase, additional dissections were undertaken, including a second attempt at the lumbodorsal fascia, a 10 cm cross-section of the abdomen, the deep fascia of the arm, and an anterior prosection of the pelvis.

=== Phase three ===
The third phase aimed to create a full-body fascia plastinate for exhibition at the Sixth International Fascia Research Congress in Montreal, Canada, in 2021. This phase involved complex decisions on how best to dissect and display the fascial structures in a meaningful way. This plastinate has now become a major highlight at the Body Worlds museum in Berlin.

A collection of ten plastinated specimens from this project showing fascial architecture of selected human body regions was given as a long-term loan to the University of Padova in Italy in 2023, where the collection is currently displayed for the purpose of educating medical students at the entrance hall of the Department of Neuroscience.

== Techniques and methodologies ==
The project employs advanced plastination techniques to preserve the intricate details of the fascial network. This involves a meticulous process where water and lipids in biological tissues are replaced with curable polymers like silicone, epoxy, or polyester, resulting in odorless, durable, and anatomically precise specimens. These plastinates are then used for educational and research purposes, showcasing the complexity and functionality of fascia.

== Scientific significance ==
The plastination of the fascial net has significant implications for both medical research and education. It allows for detailed examination of the fascia's role in musculoskeletal health, its contribution to proprioception, and its involvement in various medical conditions. The project has provided critical insights into how fascia affects movement, stability, and overall physical health, thus influencing treatment approaches in physiotherapy, sports medicine, and surgery.

== Controversies and ethical considerations ==
Plastination, while groundbreaking, has not been without controversy. Ethical concerns have been raised regarding the sourcing of bodies for plastination and the display of human remains in public exhibitions. The Fascial Net Plastination Project however, adheres to strict ethical guidelines, ensuring that all specimens are sourced from legally and ethically approved donations, with explicit consent from donors or their families.

== Presentation and reception ==
The project was prominently featured at the 2021 Fascia Research Congress. This presentation included detailed discussions on the techniques used, the scientific findings from the plastinated specimens, and their applications in medical education and research. The project received considerable attention from the scientific community for its innovative approach to studying fascia and its potential to revolutionize anatomical science.

FR:EIA was officially unveiled on November 24, 2021, over a webinar with 1000+ participants as they unveiled its permanent display at the Body Worlds museum in Berlin, Germany.

== Impact and future directions ==
The Fascial Net Plastination Project has already made significant contributions to the field of fascia research. By providing a durable and detailed representation of the fascial network, it has enhanced the understanding of this critical component of human anatomy. Future directions for the project include expanding the range of specimens, refining plastination techniques, and fostering international collaborations to further explore the clinical implications of fascia.
