= Dense connective tissue =

Type of connective tissue in animals

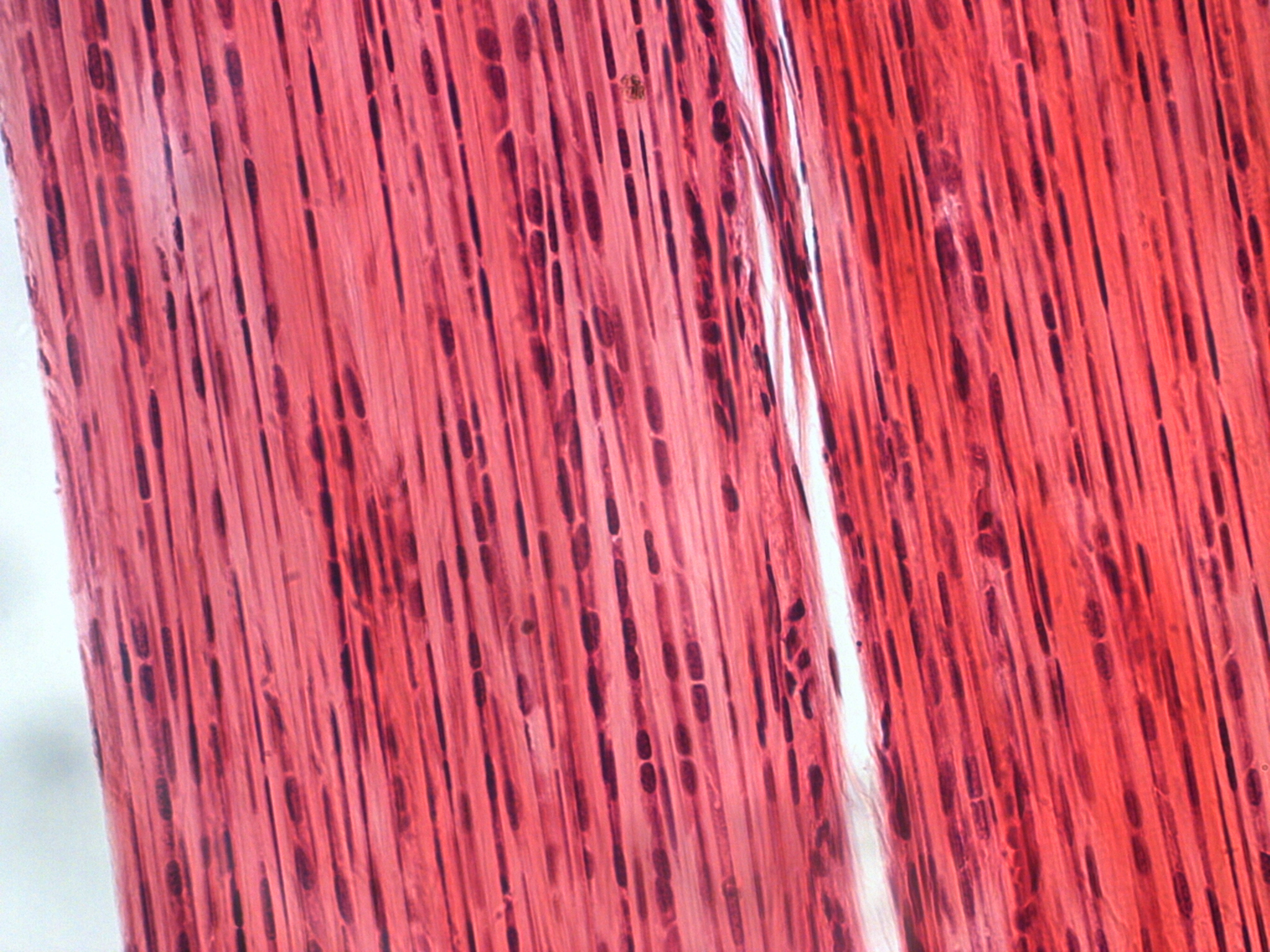

Details

Identifiers
- Latin: textus connectivus compactus
- TH: H2.00.03.1.00003

Dense connective tissue, also called dense fibrous tissue, is a type of connective tissue with fibers as its main matrix element. The fibers are mainly composed of type I collagen. Crowded between the collagen fibers are rows of fibroblasts, fiber-forming cells, that generate the fibers. Dense connective tissue forms strong, rope-like structures such as tendons and ligaments. Tendons attach skeletal muscles to bones; ligaments connect bones to bones at joints. Ligaments are more stretchy and contain more elastic fibers than tendons. Dense connective tissue also make up the lower layers of the skin (dermis), where it is arranged in sheets. In addition, the sclera contains dense connective tissue

== Classification ==
It is classified as either dense regular connective tissue or dense irregular connective tissue.

== See also ==
- Loose connective tissue
