= Fascial compartments of the forearm =

The fascial compartments of the forearm are the posterior compartment of the forearm and the anterior compartment of the forearm.
