= Ground substance =

Extracellular non-fibrous substance

Ground substance is an amorphous gel-like substance in the extracellular space of animals that contains all components of the extracellular matrix (ECM) except for fibrous materials such as collagen and elastin. Ground substance is active in the development, movement, and proliferation of tissues, as well as their metabolism. Additionally, cells use it for support, water storage, binding, and a medium for intercellular exchange (especially between blood cells and other types of cells). Ground substance provides lubrication for collagen fibers.

The components of the ground substance vary depending on the tissue. Ground substance is primarily composed of water and large organic molecules, such as glycosaminoglycans (GAGs), proteoglycans, and glycoproteins. GAGs are polysaccharides that trap water, giving the ground substance a gel-like texture. Important GAGs found in ground substance include hyaluronic acid, heparan sulfate, dermatan sulfate, and chondroitin sulfate. With the exception of hyaluronic acid, GAGs are bound to proteins called proteoglycans. Glycoproteins are proteins that attach components of the ground substance to one another and to the surfaces of cells. Components of the ground substance are secreted by fibroblasts. Usually it is not visible on slides, because it is lost during staining in the preparation process.

Link proteins such as vinculin, spectrin and actomyosin stabilize the proteoglycans and organize elastic fibers in the ECM. Changes in the density of ground substance can allow collagen fibers to form aberrant cross-links. Loose connective tissue is characterized by few fibers and cells, and a relatively large amount of ground substance. Dense connective tissue has a smaller amount of ground substance compared to the fibrous material.

The meaning of the term has evolved over time.

== See also ==
- Milieu intérieur
