= Brachial fascia =

Connective tissue over upper arm muscles

Details

Identifiers
- Latin: fascia brachii
- TA98: A04.6.03.005
- TA2: 2541
- FMA: 37784

The brachial fascia (deep fascia of the arm) is continuous with that covering the deltoideus and the pectoralis major muscle, by means of which it is attached, above, to the clavicle, acromion, and spine of the scapula; it forms a thin, loose, membranous sheath for the muscles of the arm, and sends septa between them; it is composed of fibers disposed in a circular or spiral direction, and connected together by vertical and oblique fibers.

It differs in thickness at different parts, being thin over the biceps brachii, but thicker where it covers the triceps brachii, and over the epicondyles of the humerus: it is strengthened by fibrous aponeuroses, derived from the pectoralis major and latissimus dorsi medially, and from the deltoideus laterally.

On either side it gives off a strong intermuscular septum, which is attached to the corresponding supracondylar ridge and epicondyle of the humerus.
