= Dense regular connective tissue =

Type of connective tissue in animals

Dense regular connective tissue (DRCT) provides connection between different tissues in the human body. The collagen fibers in dense regular connective tissue are bundled in a parallel fashion. DRCT is divided into white fibrous connective tissue and yellow fibrous connective tissue, both of which occur in two forms: cord arrangement and sheath arrangement.

In cord arrangement, bundles of collagen and matrix are distributed in regular alternate patterns. In sheath arrangement, collagen bundles and matrix are distributed in irregular patterns, sometimes in the form of a network. It is similar to areolar tissue, but in DRCT elastic fibers are completely absent.

== Structures formed ==
- An example of their use is in tendons, which connect muscle to bone and derive their strength from the regular, longitudinal arrangement of bundles of collagen fibers.
- Ligaments bind bone to bone and are similar in structure to tendons.
- Aponeuroses are layers of flat, broad tendons that join muscles and the body parts the muscles act upon, whether it be bone or muscle.

== Functions ==
Dense regular connective tissue has great tensile strength that resists pulling forces especially well in one direction.

DRCT has a very poor blood supply, which is why damaged tendons and ligaments are slow to heal.
