= Robert Schleip =

German psychologist and author

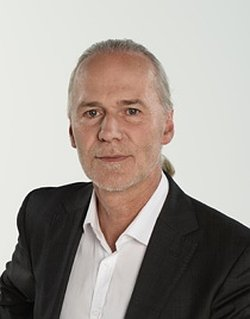
- Born: Robert Schleip; 1954 (age 71–72); Göppingen, Germany
- Occupations: Psychologist, biologist

Academic background
- Education: Heidelberg University, University of Ulm
- Thesis: Active fascial contractility: Fascia may be able to contract in a smooth muscle-like manner and thereby influence musculoskeletal dynamics (2005)

Academic work
- Discipline: Psychology; Human Biology; Alternative medicine
- Sub-discipline: Fascia; Rolfing; Osteopathy; Feldenkrais

Robert Schleip (born 1954) is a German psychologist, human biologist and author, best known for his work in the field of fascia. He serves as the director of the Fascia Research Group, a research collaboration between the University of Ulm and the Technical University of Munich. Schleip is also the founding director of the Fascia Research Society, the research director of the European Rolfing Association and vice president of the Ida P. Rolf Research Foundation. He is involved in the alternative medicine field of rolfing.

== Education ==
In 1978, Schleip became Germany's first certified rolfer at the Rolf Institute and in 1983 became a Certified Advanced Rolfer in the field of Structural Integration.

Schleip graduated with a degree in psychology from Heidelberg University in 1980. From 1984 to 1987 he trained as a Feldenkrais teacher and became a Certified Feldenkrais Practitioner in the field of Sensorimotor Facilitation from the International Feldenkrais Guild in 1987.

In 2006, he earned his doctorate in human biology from the University of Ulm. That year he received the "Vladimir Janda Prize for Musculoskeletal Medicine" for research he performed with Werner Klingler.

In 2023, he was appointed to a research professorship in the department for Health & Psychology for the university by the Diploma University of Applied Sciences.

== Rolfing ==
Schleip has been a rolfing instructor since 1988 and maintains a part-time private practice in Munich. He served as a member on the board of directors for the European Rolfing Association in Munich from 1995 to 1999, and on the ethics committee from 1999 to 2003, as well as a member of the international advisory board of the Rolf Institute in Boulder from 2000 to 2005.

In 2006, he became the research director of the European Rolfing Association. He also is vice president of Ida P. Rolf Research Foundation In 2013, he received the RISI Award for "Excellence in Research" by the Rolf Institute.

== Fascia research ==
In 2007, Schleip along with Werner Klingler organized the first Fascia Research Congress, sponsored by the National Institute of Health and hosted at Harvard Medical School. The conference was covered in a two-page Science Magazine article titled "Cell Biology Meets Rolfing with a section titled "From Rolfer to Researcher" referring to Schleip's career shift. He has served on the scientific committee for all subsequent congresses (2009, 2012, 2015, 2018, 2022, 2025) and chaired the 2018 and 2022 congresses.

He was a founding member of the Fascia Research Society in 2011 and has served on the board of directors since 2020. In 2023 he received the designation of founding director.

Schleip is the director of the Fascia Research Group, a research collaboration between the University of Ulm (2007-2019) and the Technical University of Munich (2019–Present).

He is co-founder and co-director of the Institute für Angewandte & Integrative Gesundheitsforschung (IAIG), a research institute directed towards applied and integrative health research under the umbrella of the Diploma University of Applied Sciences in Germany (2024–present).

== Fascial Net Plastination Project ==
In 2018, Schleip spearheaded the Fascial Net Plastination Project (FNPP), ananatomical research initiative designed to plastinate and study the human fascial network. The FNPP brought together experts in anatomy, dissection, and plastination, to plastinate a complete human fascia specimen.

The project created a full-body human fascia plastinate named FR:EIA (Fascia Revealed: Educating Interconnected Anatomy). FR:EIA was unveiled at the 2021 Fascia Research Congress and is currently on display at the Body Worlds exhibition in Berlin.

== Lecturer ==
From 2005 to 2013, he served as a neurophysiology researcher at the University of Ulm.[23] In 2014, he received a lifelong appointment as Visiting Professor at the Instituto Universitario de Ciencias de la Salud, Buenos Aires.[17]

Since 2019, Schleip has been a Research Associate and, since 2024, a Senior Scientist at the professorship of conservative and rehabilitative orthopaedics in the TUM School of Medicine & Health at the Technical University of Munich.[23]

Since 2019, Schleip has been a professor of conservative and rehabilitative orthopaedics in the Department of Sport and Health Sciences at the Technical University of Munich, and a faculty member at the Diploma University of Applied Sciences. In 2023, he was appointed as a professor of health and psychology at the Diploma University of Applied Sciences.

== Author ==
- Fascia: The Tensional Network of the Human Body: The science and clinical applications in manual and movement therapy. Elsevier Health Sciences. 26 February 2013. ISBN 978-0-7020-5228-6.
- Fascia in Sport and Movement. Handspring. 2015. ISBN 978-1-909141-07-0.
- Fascial Fitness: How to be Vital, Elastic and Dynamic in Everyday Life and Sport. Lotus. 2017. ISBN 978-1-905367-71-9.
- Fascia: The Tensional Network of the Human Body Expert Consult: Fascia: The Tensional Network of the Human Body - E-Book. Elsevier Health Sciences. 8 December 2021. ISBN 978-0-7020-8413-3.
- Fascial Fitness, Second Edition: Practical Exercises to Stay Flexible, Active and Pain Free in Just 20 Minutes a Week. North Atlantic Books. 6 July 2021. ISBN 978-1-62317-675-4.
- Fascia in Sport and Movement, Second edition. Jessica Kingsley Publishers. 30 March 2021. ISBN 978-1-912085-78-1.
- Der Faszien-Code: Wie die Genetik des Bindegewebes deine Gesundheit beeinflusst und du typgerecht trainierst, um Beweglichkeit und Fitness zu optimieren. Riva Verlag. 18 February 2024. ISBN 978-3-7453-2298-9.

== Scientific papers ==
=== Active fascial contractility ===
- Schleip, R.; Klingler, W.; Lehmann-Horn, F. (2005). "Active fascial contractility: Fascia may be able to contract in a smooth muscle-like manner and thereby influence musculoskeletal dynamics". Medical Hypotheses. 65 (2): 273–277. doi:10.1016/j.mehy.2005.03.005. PMID 15922099.
- Schleip, R.; Naylor, I.L.; Ursu, D.; Melzer, W.; Zorn, A.; Wilke, H.J.; Lehmann-Horn, F.; Klingler, W. (2006). "Passive muscle stiffness may be influenced by active contractility of intramuscular connective tissue". Medical Hypotheses. 66 (1): 66–71. doi:10.1016/j.mehy.2005.08.025. PMID 16209907.
- Schleip, R.; Klingler, W. (2019). "Active contractile properties of fascia". Clinical Anatomy. 32 (7): 891–895. doi:10.1002/ca.23391. PMID 31012158.
- Schleip, R.; Gabbiani, G.; Wilke, J.; Naylor, I.; Hinz, B.; Zorn, A.; Jäger, H.; Schreiner, S.; Klingler, W. (2019). "Fascia Is Able to Actively Contract and May Thereby Influence Musculoskeletal Dynamics: A Histochemical and Mechanographic Investigation". Frontiers in Physiology. 10 336. doi:10.3389/fphys.2019.00336. PMC 6455047. PMID 31001134.

=== Biomechanical, sensory, and physiological properties of the body-wide fascia network ===
- Chaudhry, H.; Huang, C.V.; Schleip, R.; Ji, Z.; Bukiet, B.; Findley, T. (2007). "Viscoelastic behavior of human fasciae under extension in manual therapy". Journal of Bodywork and Movement Therapies. 11 (2): 159–167. doi:10.1016/j.jbmt.2006.08.012.
- Schleip, R.; Duerselen, L.; Vleeming, A.; Naylor, I.L.; Lehmann-Horn, F.; Zorn, A.; Jaeger, H.; Klingler, W. (2012). "Strain hardening of fascia: Static stretching of dense fibrous connective tissues can induce a temporary stiffness increase accompanied by enhanced matrix hydration". Journal of Bodywork and Movement Therapies. 16 (1): 94–100. doi:10.1016/j.jbmt.2011.09.003. PMID 22196433.
- Schleip, R.; Mechsner, F.; Zorn, A.; Klingler, W. (2014). "The bodywide fascial network as a sensory organ for haptic perception". Journal of Motor Behavior. 46 (3): 191–193. doi:10.1080/00222895.2014.880306. PMID 24628059.
- Schleip, R.; Zorn, A.; Klingler, W. (2014). "Clinical relevance of fascial tissue and dysfunctions". Current Pain and Headache Reports. 18 (8): 439. doi:10.1007/s11916-014-0439-y. PMID 24962403.

=== Connective tissue research ===
- Schleip, R.; Klingler, W.; Wearing, S.; Naylor, I.; Zuegel, M.; Hoppe, K. (2016). "Functional in vitro tension measurements of fascial tissue – a novel modified superfusion approach". Musculoskeletal Neuronal Interactions. 16 (3): 256–260. PMC 5114348. PMID 27609040.
- Schleip, R.; Wilke, J.; Schreiner, S.; Wetterslev, M.; Klingler, W. (2018). "Needle biopsy-derived myofascial tissue samples are sufficient for quantification of myofibroblast density". Clinical Anatomy. 31 (3): 368–372. doi:10.1002/ca.23040. PMID 29314236.

=== TV documentaries ===
- ARTE (French/German TV Channel): Since 2018, ARTE has aired documentaries on the world of fascia, featuring Robert Schleip.
- SWR (German TV Channel): Documentaries aired on October 25, 2021, and September 10, 2020, explored the "fascia boom" and included contributions from Schleip.
