= Loose connective tissue =

Type of connective tissue in animals

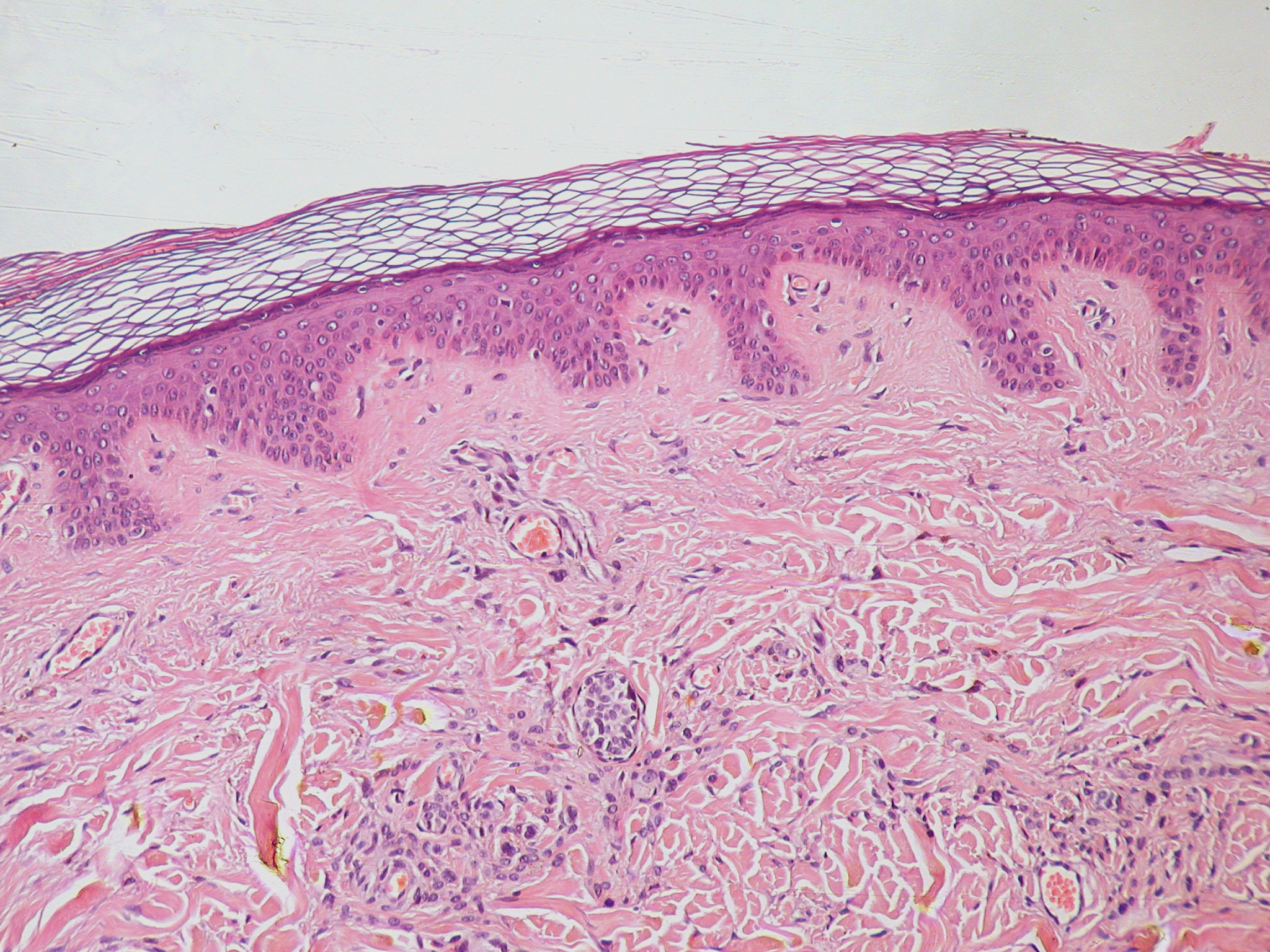
- Section of dermis. The papillary dermis consists of loose connective tissue.

Details

Identifiers
- Latin: textus connectivus laxus
- TA98: A04.5.02.020; A16.0.03.006
- TA2: 7089
- TH: H2.00.03.1.00002
- FMA: 19783

Loose connective tissue, also known as areolar tissue, is a cellular connective tissue with thin and relatively sparse collagen fibers. They have a semi-fluid matrix with lesser proportions of fibers. Its ground substance occupies more volume than the fibers do. It has a viscous to gel-like consistency and plays an important role in the diffusion of oxygen and nutrients from the capillaries that course through this connective tissue as well as in the diffusion of carbon dioxide and metabolic wastes back to the vessels. Moreover, loose connective tissue is primarily located beneath the epithelia that cover the body surfaces and line the internal surfaces of the body. It is also associated with the epithelium of glands and surrounds the smallest blood vessels. This tissue is thus the initial site where pathogenic agents, such as bacteria that have breached an epithelial surface, are challenged and destroyed by cells of the immune system.

In the past, the designations areolar tissue, adipose tissue, and reticular tissue have been listed as subsets of loose connective tissue. However, they are no longer considered subsets of loose connective tissue. Loose connective tissue is a subset of connective tissue proper. Furthermore, areolar tissue is the same as loose connective tissue, adipose tissue is a subset of specialized connective tissue, and reticular tissue is the presence of reticular fibers and reticular cells together forming the stroma of hemopoietic tissue (specifically the red bone marrow) and lymphatic tissue organs (lymph nodes and spleen but not the thymus).

Most cell types in loose connective tissue are transient wandering cells that migrate from local blood vessels in response to specific stimuli. Loose connective tissue, therefore, is a site of inflammatory and immune reactions. In areas of the body where foreign substances are continually present, large populations of immune cells are maintained. For example, the lamina propria, the loose connective tissue of mucous membranes, such as those of the respiratory and alimentary systems, contains large numbers of these cells.

== Structure ==
=== Composition ===
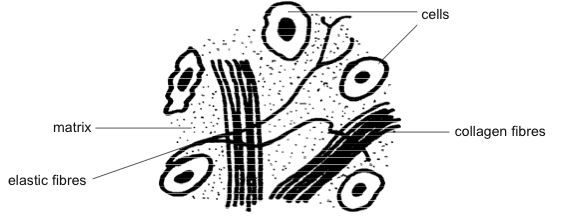
Schematic representation of the composition of loose connective tissue

It is a pliable, mesh-like tissue with a fluid matrix and functions to cushion and protect body organs.

Fibroblasts are widely dispersed in this tissue; they are irregular branching cells that secrete strong fibrous proteins and proteoglycans as an extracellular matrix.

The cells of this type of tissue are generally connected by a gelatinous substance known as ground substance primarily made up of collagenous and elastic fibers.

=== Location ===
It may be found in tissue sections from almost every part of the body. It surrounds blood vessels and nerves and penetrates with them even into the small spaces of muscles, tendons, and other tissues. It may likewise be present in the mediastinal extremities. Nearly every epithelium rests on a layer of areolar tissue, whose blood vessels provide the epithelium with nutrition, waste removal, and a ready supply of infection-fighting leukocytes when needed. Because of the abundance of open, fluid-filled space, leukocytes can move about freely in areolar tissue and can easily find and destroy pathogens.

The areolar tissue is found beneath the epidermis layer and is also underneath the epithelial tissue of all the body systems that have external openings. it makes the skin elastic and helps it to withstand pulling pain. It is also a component of the lamina propria of the digestive and respiratory tracts, the mucous membranes of reproductive and urinary systems, the stroma of glands, and the hypodermis of the skin. It is also found in the mesentery which is surrounding the intestine.

=== Fibers ===
Loose connective tissue is named based on the "weave" and type of its constituent fibers. There are three main types:

- Collagenous fibers: collagenous fibers are made of collagen and consist of bundles of fibrils that are coils of collagen molecules.
- Elastic fibers: elastic fibers are made of elastin and are "stretchable."
- Reticular fibers: reticular fibers consist of one or more types of very thin collagen fibers. They join connective tissues to other tissues.

=== Areolar tissue ===
Areolar tissue (/əˈriːələr/ or /ˌɛəriˈoʊlər, ˌær-/) is a common type of loose connective tissue (and the most widely distributed type of connective tissue in vertebrates). It is so-named because its fibers are far enough apart to leave ample open space for interstitial fluid in between (areola is Latin for a "little open space"). It is strong enough to bind different tissue types together, yet soft enough to provide flexibility and cushioning. It exhibits interlacing, loosely organized fibers, abundant blood vessels, and significant empty space filled with interstitial fluid. Many adjacent epithelial tissues (which are avascular) get their nutrients from the interstitial fluid of areolar tissue; the lamina propria is areolar in many body locations. Its fibers run in random directions and are mostly collagenous, but elastic and reticular fibers are also present. Areolar tissue is highly variable in appearance. In many serous membranes, it appears as a loose arrangement of collagenous and elastic fibers, scattered cells of various types; abundant ground substance; numerous blood vessels. In the skin and mucous membranes, it is more compact and sometimes difficult to distinguish from dense irregular connective tissue.

== Function ==
Areolar connective tissue holds organs in place and attaches epithelial tissue to other underlying tissues. It also serves as a reservoir of water and salts for surrounding tissues. Almost all cells obtain their nutrients from and release their wastes into areolar connective tissue.

== Clinical significance ==
Organs that are rich in loose connective tissue (such as the eyelids) are usually sites that undergo oedema, indicating kidney failure or nephrotic syndrome. Therefore, periorbital swelling is one characteristic finding in severe kidney disease.

== See also ==
- Dense connective tissue
- List of distinct cell types in the adult human body
