= Cooling down =

Transition to a lower activity level in physical exercise

Cooling down (also known as limbering down or warming down) is the transition from intense physical activity to a more typical activity level. A typical cool-down activity after a workout might involve a jogging slowly or walking for a few minutes. Cooling down allows the heart rate to return to its resting rate.

Overall, the process has little or no effect on short-term or long-term benefits, such as delayed-onset muscle soreness or injury prevention. However, many athletes say that they subjectively feel better if they have engaged in a cool-down activity.

== Procedure ==
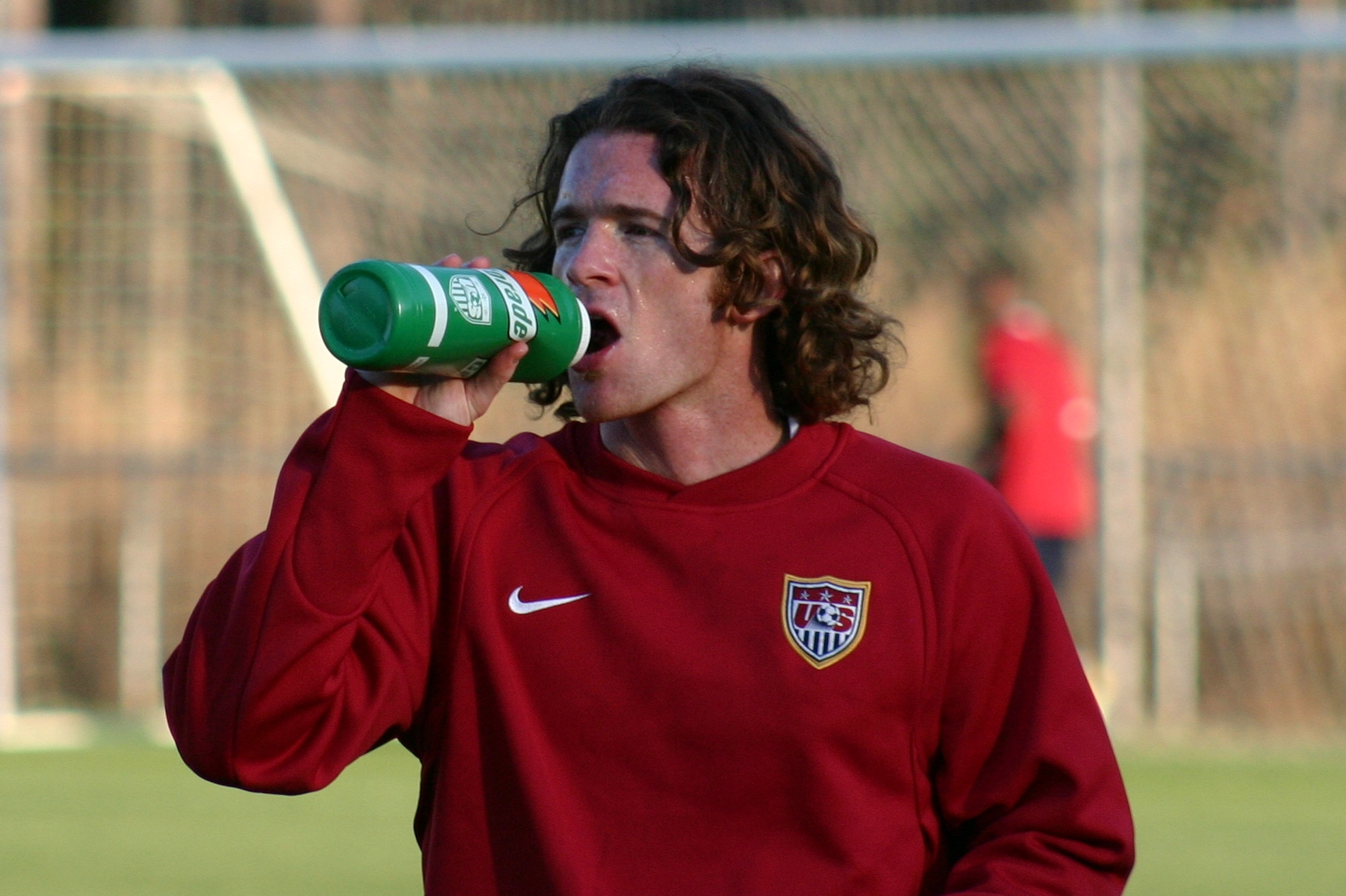
Rehydrating after practice

An effective cool-down after exercise involves a gradual, continuous decrease in exercise intensity, such as from a hard run to an easy jog to a brisk walk. The duration varies for different people, but 3–10 minutes is generally considered adequate for most people. Most cool-downs are done at the end of an exercise session or within an hour of its end.

Active cool-downs include activities such as walking, jogging slowly, or walking in a swimming pool. Passive cool-downs include activities such as sitting or lying down or using a sauna.

Effective cool-downs are usually short activities that the athlete enjoys, performed at an easy or moderate activity level, and do not add additional strain to damaged muscles.

Rehydration is an essential part of the procedure and should be done either during stretching and light intensity or after these steps. Refueling the body with water and electrolyte-rich drinks, like sports drinks, will keep the body hydrated.

== Stretching ==
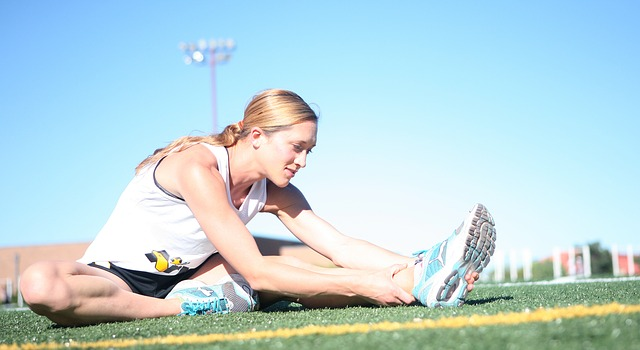
Static stretching

Static stretching is a typical cool-down activity. Stretching increases flexibility. Each stretch should be held for a minimum of 10–20 seconds and stretched to the point of mild discomfort but not pain. Each muscle used in mid-high-intensity exercise should then be stretched during the cool-down.

Stretching has long been promoted as a cool-down activity, in the hope of reducing stiff-feeling muscles the next day. However, stretching after exercise does not appear to improve either short-term musculotendinous stiffness or range of motion in the short term. Whether greater flexibility is desirable depends upon the sport; elite long-distance runners, for example, may have worse running economy if they become more flexible.

== Half-time cooling down ==
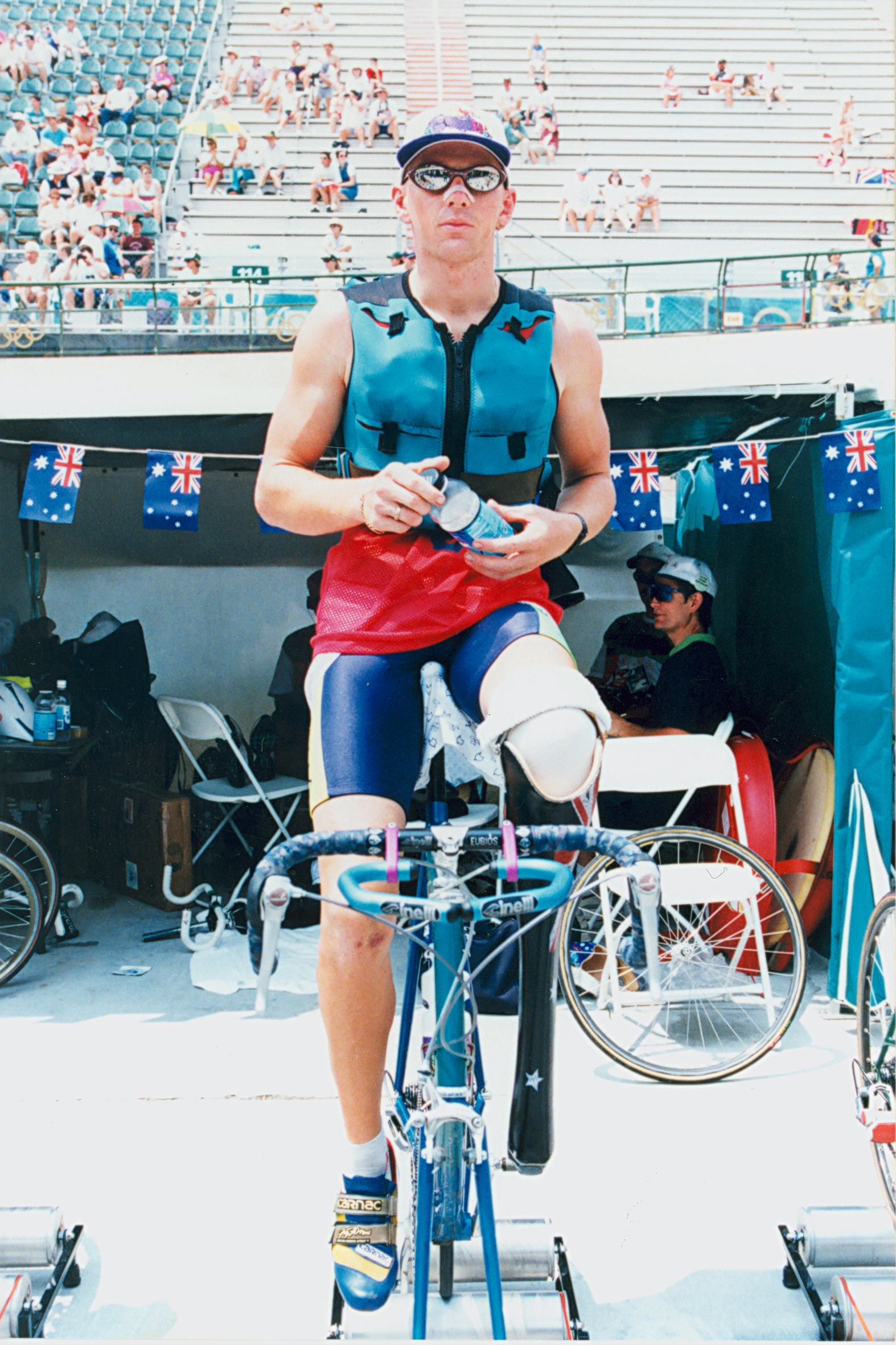
Paralympian using an ice vest

This is a popular process for elite sporting clubs and athletes. It involves using either ice vests, cooling products or manually cooling down the body through gentle light intensity exercise to cool down the body during half time or breaks in an activity or sport. Half-time cooling down has proven to decrease body temperature and increase aerobic performance. Many sporting groups use cooling down jackets during half-time. Australian elite sporting teams such as those in the AFL, Olympic teams, military and elite athletes across all sporting fields use cooling down vests to increase performance and gain a competitive advantage over their competition.

== Performance effects ==
An active cool-down does not improve sports performance the next day or later in the same day (e.g., if the person has an early-morning workout followed by a competition in the late afternoon). An active cool-down after a high-intensity activity may have a small effect on performance in the near future (e.g., later that week). As of 2018, the effects on endurance sports have not been researched.

== Cardiovascular issues, health, and heart rate ==
During aerobic exercise, peripheral veins, particularly those within a muscle, dilate to accommodate the increased blood flow through exercising muscle. The skeletal-muscle pump assists in returning blood to the heart and maintaining cardiac output. A sudden cessation of strenuous exercise may cause blood to pool in peripheral dilated veins, which may cause varicose veins. A cool-down period allows a more gradual return to venous tone. The heart will also need to beat faster to adequately oxygenate the body and maintain blood pressure. Cooling down has been promoted with the hope that it will reduce the risk of fainting after a workout. However, whether it is successful for that purpose is unknown. One study found that cooling down may reduce dizziness for elite athletes and vocal performers after strenuous workouts.

It has been hypothesized that individuals who are at risk for cardiovascular disease may develop negative cardiovascular outcomes in the event that cool-downs are not completed following bouts of exercise. However, current clinical evidence disputes this. Reviews on the inclusion of exercise-therapy for management of cardiovascular disease have indicated that regular exercise instead induces positive long-term adaptions for the cardiovascular system that reduce the risk of death and outcomes requiring hospitalization.

== Muscle soreness and injuries ==
Overall, active cool-downs generally do not have a significant effect on delayed-onset muscle soreness (feeling sore the next day). There may sometimes be factors that result in a cool-down activity to make muscle soreness worse, such as a longer cool-down jogging session by non-elite athletes, since the extra exercise time would result in more muscle damage. In other cases, such as an elite cyclist biking at a low intensity for a few minutes, the cool-down activity might feel beneficial. Similarly, certain activities, such as foam rolling, may be more likely to reduce muscle soreness than others.

Cooling down has long been promoted as a way to prevent injuries, but active cool-downs do not prevent injuries.

== See also ==
- Warming up
- Stretching
