= Ischemic compression =

Manual therapy technique

Ischemic compression is a therapy technique used in manual therapy, where blockage of blood in an area of the body is deliberately made, so that a resurgence of local blood flow will occur upon release.

Ischemic compression is commonly applied to trigger points, in what is known as trigger point therapy, where enough sustained pressure is applied to a trigger point with a tolerable amount of pain, and as discomfort is reduced, additional pressure is gradually given.

== See also ==
- Myofascial release
