= David G. Simons =

American physician and airman

Maj. David G. Simons
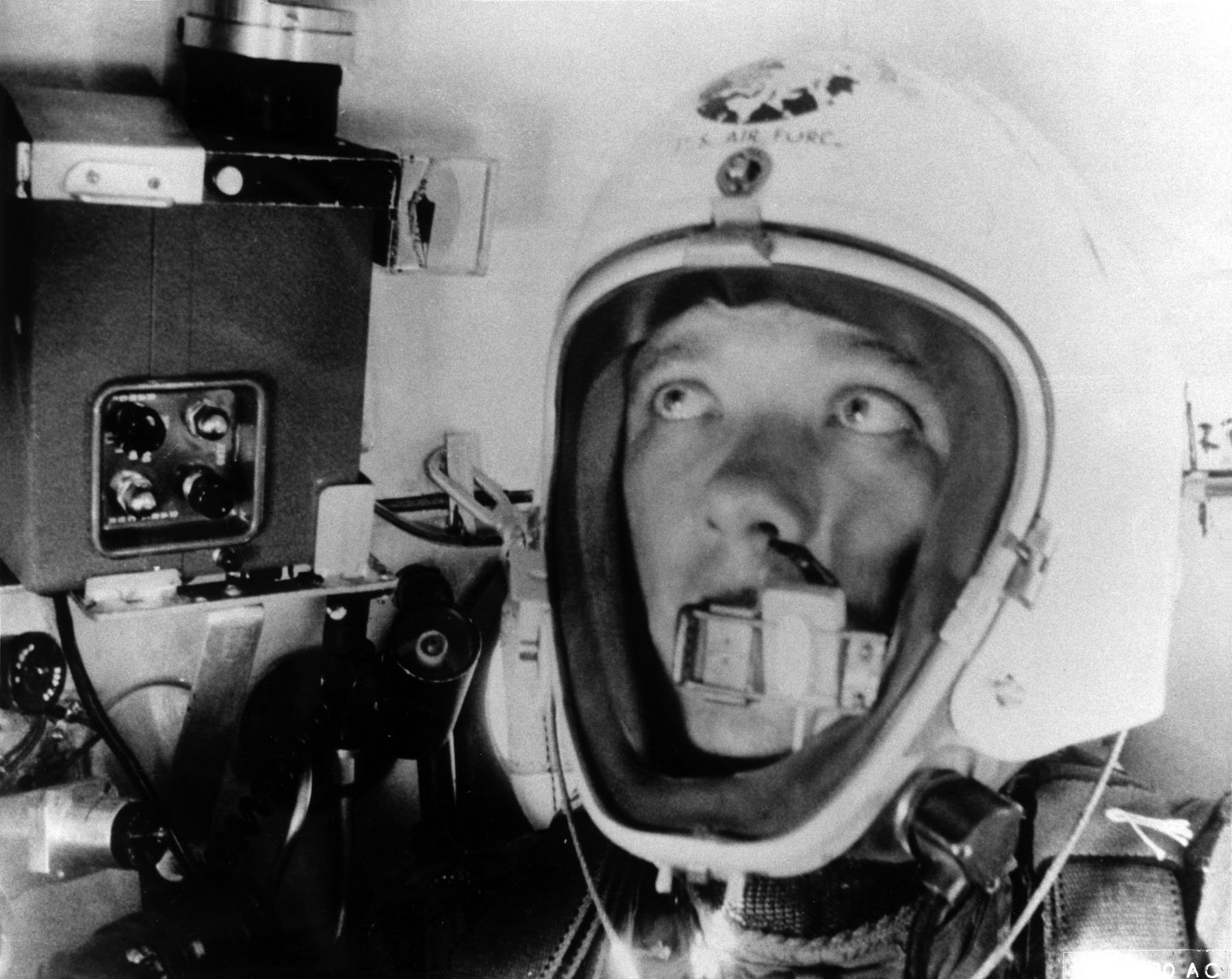
- Born: David Goodman Simons; June 7, 1922; Pennsylvania, U.S.
- Died: April 5, 2010 (aged 87); Covington, Georgia, U.S.

David Goodman Simons (June 7, 1922 – April 5, 2010) was an American physician and U.S. Air Force lieutenant colonel who, as part of Project Manhigh, set a high-altitude balloon flight record in 1957 at 19 miles (31 km) above the Earth in an aluminum capsule suspended from a helium balloon. He received the Distinguished Flying Cross for this record. Simons was shown on the cover of Life of September 2, 1957, issue.

Simons went on to a distinguished career in academic medicine as an instructor at the VA Medical Center, Long Beach, California. He authored more than 200 publications on trigger points and related treatments for chronic myofascial pain. He co-authored the Trigger Point Manual with Janet G. Travell. Originally published in 1983, it was considered a breakthrough, and remains a foundational work in the field.

== Career ==
At the time of Project Manhigh, then-Major Simons was Chief, Space Biology Branch, Aero-Medical Laboratory, Holloman Air Development Center, Alamogordo, New Mexico.

== In popular culture ==
"Manhigh" was the name of the 2013 season one finale of the Showtime TV series Masters of Sex, and featured television coverage of Major Simons' mission and return to Earth.
