= Janet G. Travell =

American physician

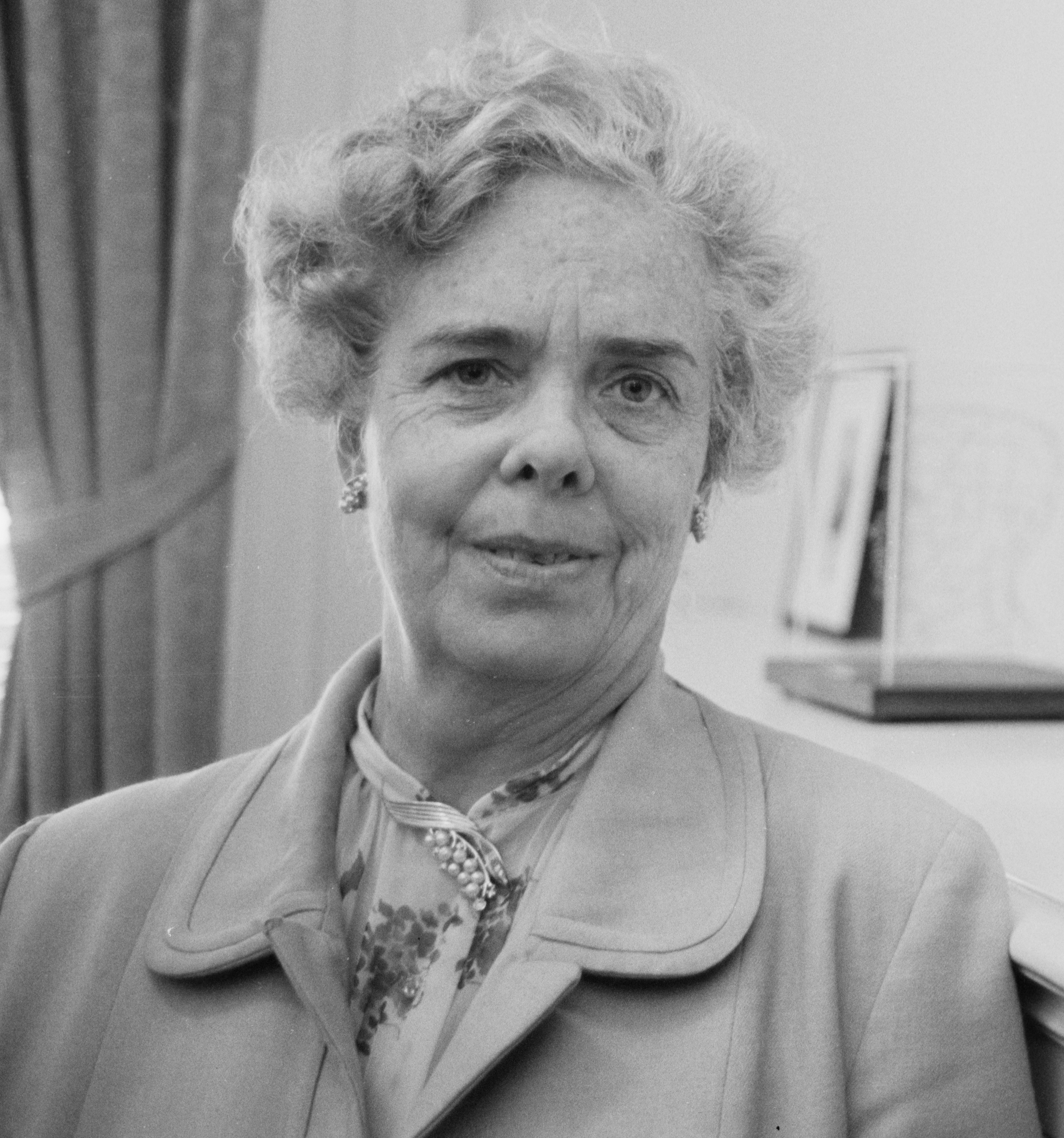
- Travell in 1961

Physician to the President
- In office 1961–1965
- President: John F. Kennedy; Lyndon Johnson
- Preceded by: Howard McCrum Snyder
- Succeeded by: George G. Burkley

Personal details
- Born: December 17, 1901
- Died: August 1, 1997 (aged 95)
- Education: Wellesley College
- Occupation: Physician and medical researcher
- Known for: President John F. Kennedy's personal physician

Janet Graham Travell (December 17, 1901 – August 1, 1997) was an American physician and medical researcher.

== Early life and education ==
She was born in 1901 to John Willard and Janet Eliza (Davidson) Travell. Heavily influenced by her father's profession of physician, Travell made the decision to pursue a career in the medical field. In June 1929, in New York City, Janet married John William Gordon Powell, who was an investment counselor. They had two daughters—Janet and Virginia. At the age of 95, Travell died of heart failure at her home in Northampton, Massachusetts.

She is remembered as President John F. Kennedy's personal physician and a researcher of the concept of trigger points as a cause of musculoskeletal referred pain.

== Career ==
During her career, Travell pioneered techniques for the treatment of myofascial pain, including dry needling. Her career began with her educational pursuits at Wellesley College and continued in graduate school as she pursued an M.D. from Cornell University Medical College in New York City. Upon graduating in 1926, Travell completed two years of residency at New York Hospital while concurrently serving as an ambulance surgeon for the New York City police force. After completion of residency, Travell became a research fellow at Bellevue Hospital, where she studied the effects of digitalis in patients with lobar pneumonia. Once her fellowship was concluded, Travell returned to Cornell University to serve as instructor in the Department of Pharmacology and later as Associate Professor of Clinical Pharmacology. While working for Cornell, she also acted as a cardiology consultant for Sea View Hospital in Staten Island.

Travell accepted a Josiah Macy, Jr. Fellowship at Beth Israel Hospital in New York to study arterial disease from 1939 to 1941. It was during her tenure that she first became interested in skeletal muscle pain, which defined her later career. Her research produced new anesthetic techniques for the treatment of painful back muscle spasms that proved very successful among patients. Travell's techniques included the use of a local procaine injection and vapocoolant sprays to relieve pain. The sprays are still popular in sports medicine treatments today.

It was her success with alleviating skeletal muscle pain that resulted in Travell being the first female personal Physician to the President. Travell was called upon by the personal orthopedic surgeon of Senator John F. Kennedy to assist with back pain treatments. Kennedy suffered from terrible pain possibly resulting from invasive back surgeries related to injuries sustained during World War II. When Kennedy won the presidential election in 1960, he appointed her as his personal physician. Her treatments included the use of a rocking chair with a matching rocking ottoman to help alleviate back pain, in the process popularizing their use among the public, who saw the President pictured in his rocker in the Oval Office. She continued to serve as Personal Physician to the President following the assassination of John F. Kennedy, with his successor Lyndon B. Johnson. She continued through Johnson's re-election, but decided to leave the White House in 1965.

While serving as the President's personal physician, Travell also took on the role of Associate Clinical Professor of Medicine at the George Washington University in 1961. Even after leaving the White House, she continued teaching at the university as a faculty member for the School of Medicine. She occupied positions as Associate Clinical Professor 1961–1970, Emeritus Clinical Professor of Medicine 1970–1988, and Honorary Clinical Professor of Medicine from 1988 until her death in 1997. Travell remained active in the medical field until the end: writing articles, giving lectures, and attending conferences.

== Research ==
Her personal interest led her to investigate, explain and expound on the phenomenon of myofascial pain syndrome, secondary to trigger points, first written about in the 1920s by Dr Dudley J. Morton. She drew attention to the role of "Morton's Toe" and its responsibility for causing physical pain throughout the body.

Travell's research resulted in over 100 scientific articles, as well as the acclaimed 1983 co-authored book with David G. Simons: Myofascial Pain and Dysfunction. The Trigger Point Manual. She also wrote her autobiography, Office Hours: Day and Night, which sheds light on her career and life.
