= Dry needling =

Alternative therapy

Dry needling, also known as trigger point dry needling and intramuscular stimulation, is a treatment technique used by various healthcare practitioners, including physical therapists, physicians, and chiropractors, among others. Acupuncturists usually maintain that dry needling is adapted from acupuncture, but others consider dry needling as a variation of trigger point injections. It involves the use of either solid filiform needles or hollow-core hypodermic needles for therapy of muscle pain, including pain related to myofascial pain syndrome. Dry needling is mainly used to treat myofascial trigger points, but it is also used to target connective tissue, neural ailments, and muscular ailments. The American Physical Therapy Association defines dry needling as a technique used to treat dysfunction of skeletal muscle and connective tissue, minimize pain, and improve or regulate structural or functional damage.

There is conflicting evidence regarding the effectiveness of dry needling. Some results suggest that it is an effective treatment for certain kinds of muscle pain, while other studies have shown no benefit compared to a placebo; however, not enough high-quality, long-term, and large-scale studies have been done on the technique to draw clear conclusions about its efficacy. Currently, dry needling is being practiced in the United States, Canada, Europe, Australia, and other parts of the world.

== Origin ==
=== Etymology and terminology ===
The origin of the term dry needling is attributed to Janet G. Travell. In her 1983 book, Myofascial Pain and Dysfunction: Trigger Point Manual, Travell uses the term dry needling to differentiate between two hypodermic needle techniques when performing trigger point therapy. However, Travell did not elaborate on the details of the dry needling techniques: the injection of a local anesthetic and the mechanical use of a hypodermic needle without injecting a solution. The current techniques were based on traditional and Western medical acupuncture.

=== Initial techniques ===
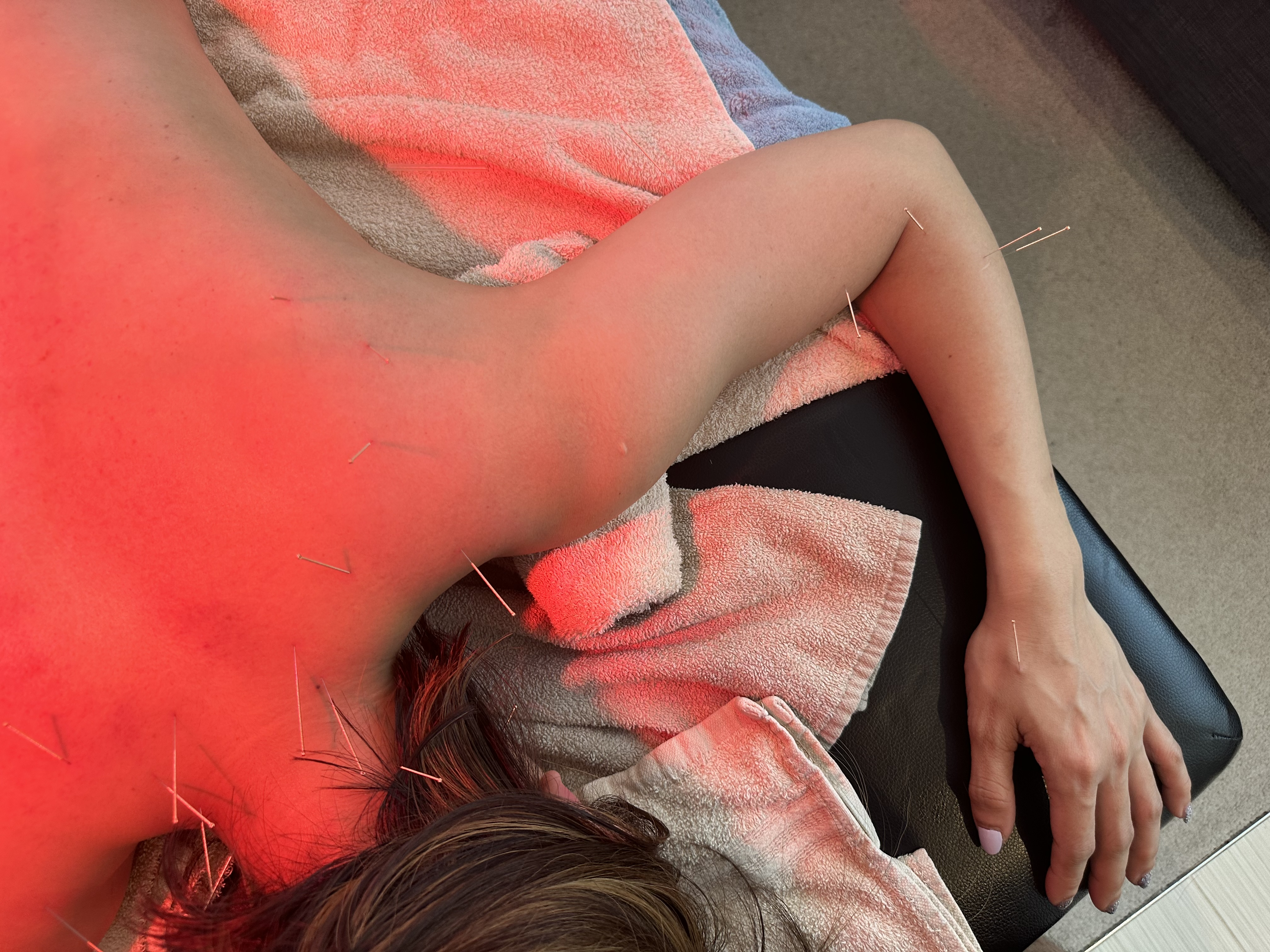
Dry needling and infrared light on the back of body

Travell preferred a 1.5-in hypodermic needle for trigger point therapy and used this needle for both injection therapy and dry needling. Travell never used an acupuncture needle. Travell had access to acupuncture needles but reasoned that they were far too thin for trigger point therapy. She preferred hypodermic needles because of their strength and tactile feedback: "A 22-gauge, 3.8-cm (1.5-in) needle is usually suitable for most superficial muscles. In hyperalgesic patients, a 25-gauge, 3.8-cm (1.5-in) needle may cause less discomfort, but will not provide the clear feeling of the structures being penetrated by the needle and is more likely to be deflected by the dense contraction knots that are the target... A 27-gauge needle, 3.8-cm (1.5-in) needle is even more flexible; the tip is more likely to be deflected by the contraction knots and it provides less tactile feedback for precision injection".

== Development and regulation in the United States ==
The solid filiform needle used in dry needling is regulated by the FDA as a Class II medical device described in the code titled "Sec. 880.5580 Acupuncture needle is a device intended to pierce the skin in the practice of acupuncture". Per the Food and Drug Act of 1906 and the subsequent amendments to said act, the FDA definition applies to how the needles can be marketed and does not mean that acupuncture is the only medical procedure where these needles can be used. Dry needling using such a needle contrasts with the use of a hollow hypodermic needle to inject substances such as saline solution, botox or corticosteroids to the same point.

The founder of Integrative Systemic Dry Needling (ISDN), Yun-Tao Ma, has spearheaded the "dry needling" movement in the United States. Ma states, "Although ISDN originated in traditional Chinese methods, it has developed from the ancient empirical approach to become modern medical art rooted in evidence-based thinking and practice." Ma also states that, "Dry needling technique is a modern Western medical modality that is not related to traditional Chinese acupuncture in any way. Dry needling has its own theoretical concepts, terminology, needling technique, and clinical application."

The American Academy of Orthopedic Manual Physical Therapists states:

Dry needling is a neurophysiological evidence-based treatment technique that requires effective manual assessment of the neuromuscular system. Physical therapists are well trained to utilize dry needling with manual physical therapy interventions. Research supports that dry needling improves pain control, reduces muscle tension, normalizes biochemical and electrical dysfunction of motor end plates, and facilitates an accelerated return to active rehabilitation.

Dry needling for the treatment of myofascial (muscular) trigger points is based on theories similar, but not exclusive, to traditional acupuncture; both acupuncture and dry needling target the trigger points, which are a direct and palpable source of patient pain. A high degree of correspondence is reported between myofascial trigger point dry needling and traditional western acupuncture. Acupuncture and dry needling are similar in the underlying phenomenon and neural processes between trigger and acupuncture points. There is a high degree of correspondence between published locations of trigger points and classical acupuncture points for the relief of pain. Dry needling, and its treatment techniques and desired effects, would be most directly comparable to the use of 'a-shi' points in acupuncture. However, dry needling theory only begins to describe the complex sensation referral patterns that have been documented as "channels" or "meridians" in Chinese Medicine. What further distinguishes dry needling from traditional acupuncture is that it does not use the full range of traditional theories of Chinese Medicine, which is used to treat not only pain, but also other non-musculoskeletal issues that often cause pain. The distinction between trigger points and acupuncture points for the relief of pain is blurred.

== Technique ==
The technique for dry needling depends on which tissue is being targeted and the overall objective of the treatment. For example, one of the most common treatment objectives for dry needling, myofascial trigger points (TrPs), differs physiologically from treatments for scar tissue, connective tissue problems, and other medical issues.

In the treatment of trigger points for persons with myofascial pain syndrome, dry needling is an invasive procedure in which a filiform needle is inserted into the skin and muscle directly at a myofascial trigger point. A myofascial trigger point consists of multiple, hyperirritable contraction knots related to the production and maintenance of the pain cycle; essentially, myofascial trigger points will generate much local pain upon stimulation or irritation. Deep dry needling for treating trigger points was first introduced by the Czech neurologist Karel Lewit in 1979. Lewit had noticed that the success of injections into trigger points in relieving pain was apparently unconnected to the analgesic used.

Dry needling can be divided into categories in terms of depth of penetration: deep and superficial dry needling. Deep dry needling will inactivate myofascial trigger points by provoking a local twitch response (LTR), which is an involuntary spinal cord reflex in which the muscle fibers in the taut band of muscle contract. The LTR indicates the proper placement of the needle in a trigger point. Dry needling that elicits LTRs improves treatment outcomes, and may work by activating endogenous opioids. The activation of the endogenous opioids is for an analgesic effect using the gate control theory of pain. In addition, deep dry may also decrease pain, increase range of motion, and minimize myofascial trigger point irritability. In regards to the factor of pain reduction, relief occurs at four central levels: local pain, spinal pain through nerves, brain stem pain, and higher brain center pain.

The relief of myofascial trigger points has been more highly researched than the relief of connective tissues, muscle fascia, muscle tension, and scar tissue; however, the American Physical Therapy Association claims that there potentially may be some benefits of dry needling on these ailments according to some available evidence. The APTA also claims that dry needling should not be used as a standalone procedure, but should be used in conjunction with other treatment methods, including manual soft tissue mobilization, neuromuscular re-education, functional retraining, and therapeutic exercises. Once the needle is inserted, one can manually or electrically stimulate the filiform needle depending for the desired effect of treatment.

== Efficacy ==
There is currently no standardized form of dry needling. There is a general scarcity of extensive research in the field. Many studies published about dry needling are not randomized, contain small sample sizes, and have high dropout rates. A review recommended the usage of dry needling, compared to sham or placebo, for decreasing pain immediately after treatment and at 4 weeks in patients with upper quarter myofascial pain syndrome. However, the authors caution that "the limited number of studies performed to date, combined with methodological flaws in many of the studies, prompts caution in interpreting the results of the meta-analysis performed". Similarly, a second review of dry needling found insufficient high-quality evidence for the use of direct dry needling for short and long-term pain and disability reduction in patients with musculoskeletal pain syndromes. The same review reported that robust evidence validating the clinical diagnostic criteria for trigger point identification or diagnosis is lacking and that high-quality studies demonstrate that manual examination for the identification and localization of a trigger point is neither valid nor reliable between examiners.

Three more recent reviews reached similar conclusions: little evidence supporting the use of trigger point dry needling to treat upper shoulder pain and dysfunction, evidence not robust enough to draw a clear conclusion about safety and efficacy, and that dry needling for the treatment of myofascial pain syndrome in the lower back appeared to be a useful addition to standard therapies, but stated clear recommendations could not be made because the published studies were small and of low quality. However, a retrospective analysis of 2,910 dry needling interventions as reported by Mabry, et al. identified no reported safety events when dry needling was performed by physical therapists.

== Controversy ==
=== Risks ===
Dry needling is considered invasive. Invasive treatments are associated with infections and cutaneous infections, which can be avoided, however, by using good aseptic (sterile) technique. Nonetheless, the procedure is increasing in popularity despite the unanswered questions regarding its overall effectiveness and safety. Mild adverse events following dry needling are commonly bleeding, bruising, and pain. Severe adverse effects include pneumothorax, injury to the central nervous system and spine, and blood-borne infection transmission. The American Medical Association made a press release in 2016 that said physical therapists and other non-physicians practicing dry needling should – at a minimum – have standards that are similar to the ones for training, certification, and continuing education that exist for acupuncture. AMA board member Russell W. H. Kridel, MD: "Lax regulation and nonexistent standards surround this invasive practice. For patients' safety, practitioners should meet standards required for licensed acupuncturists and physicians."

Additional adverse effects of dry needling include cardiac tamponade and hematoma. During a recent study, a self-reported survey of almost 230,000 people, 8.6% (19726 patients) reported experiencing at least one adverse effect. 2.2% (4,963 patients) reported an adverse effect that required further treatment. However, since this study was based on the patient's self-reporting rather than actual incidence, the collective findings cited above are probably lower than the actual incidence. Because dry needling sometimes involves blood and other bodily fluids, there are sometimes risk of transmission of multiple forms of hepatitis as well as HIV.

=== Relation to acupuncture ===
The debated distinction between dry needling and acupuncture has become a controversy because it relates to an issue of scope of practice of various professions. Acupuncturists claim that dry needling is a form of acupuncture that does not fall in the scope of physical therapists, chiropractors, or the majority of other healthcare professionals; whereas those healthcare professionals claim dry needling is not acupuncture, but rather a procedure that is rooted in biomedical modern sciences. Becoming a certified acupuncturist requires hundreds of hours spent in educational programs, national-level exams, and good professional standing. On the other hand, to be certified in dry needling requires continued education or a certification program that is not yet regulated with strict standards; in addition, there is a general lack of policymakers, evaluation systems, or healthcare standards governing the technique of dry needling.

Many physical therapists and chiropractors have asserted that they are not practicing acupuncture when dry needling; however, much of dry needling research has been done concerning acupuncture. They assert that much of the basic physiological and biomechanical knowledge that dry needling utilizes is taught as part of their core physical therapy and chiropractic education and that the specific dry needling skills are supplemental to that knowledge and not exclusive to acupuncture. Many acupuncturists have argued that dry needling appears to be an acupuncture technique requiring minimal training that has been re-branded under a new name (dry needling). Whether dry needling is considered to be acupuncture depends on the definition of acupuncture, and it is argued that trigger points do not correspond to acupuncture points or meridians. They correspond by definition to the ad hoc category of 'a-shi' acupoints. This category of points is not necessarily distinct from other formal categories of acupoints. In 1983, Janet Travell described trigger point locations as 92% in correspondence with known acupuncture points. In 2006, a journal article concluded that the two point systems are in over 90% agreement. In 2009, Dorsher and Fleckenstein conclude that the strong (up to 91%) consistency of the distributions of trigger point regions' referred pain patterns to acupuncture meridians provides evidence that trigger points most likely represent the same physiological phenomenon as acupuncture points in the treatment of pain disorders.

A comparison of Western trigger points to traditional acupuncture points corroborates the 92% correspondence. In 2011, The Council of Colleges of Acupuncture and Oriental Medicine published a position paper describing dry needling as an acupuncture technique.

According to a qualitative review, dry needling combined with acupuncture was more effective in alleviating pain and achieved a higher response rate than dry needling alone. However, there is no clear research on whether dry needling is a better treatment choice over laser, physical therapy, or other combined treatments.

=== Regulation ===
The North Carolina Acupuncture Licensing Board has published a position statement asserting that dry needling is acupuncture and thus is covered by the North Carolina Acupuncture Licensing law, and is not within the present scope of practice of Physical Therapists. The Attorney General was asked for an opinion by the North Carolina Acupuncture Licensing Board which he gave in 2011: "In our opinion, the Board of Physical Therapy Examiners may determine that dry needling is within the scope of practice of physical therapy if it conducts rulemaking under the Administrative Procedure Act and adopts rules that relate dry needling to the statutory definition of practice of physical therapy." However, the North Carolina Rules Review Committee of the legislative branch found that the North Carolina Physical Therapy Board had no statutory authority for the proposed rule. The Physical Therapy board subsequently decided that they had the right to declare dry needling within scope anyway "The Board believes physical therapists can continue to perform dry needling so long as they possess the requisite education and training required by N.C.G.S. § 90–270.24(4), but there are no regulations to set the specific requirements for engaging in dry needling."

In January 2014, the Oregon Court of Appeals ruled that the Oregon Board of Chiropractic Examiners did not have the statutory authority to include dry needling in the scope of practice for chiropractors in that state. The ruling did not address whether chiropractors have the medical expertise to use dry needling or whether the training they were given was adequate. Pending further discussion of training requirements, the Oregon Physical Therapist Licensing Board has advised all Oregon physical therapists against practicing dry needling. They have not changed their ruling that dry needling is within the scope of practice for Oregon Physical Therapists.

== See also ==
- Myofascial release
