= Tóngzigōng =

Tóngzigōng (童子功) is a form of qigong exercise stressing flexibility. This art form is part of the curriculum of Shaolin Kung Fu. It is very rare to find masters, however, this is one of the basics that is learned at the Shaolin Temple, and is learned very early. Tongzigong must be practiced regularly before the body has matured, for the skill to reach its highest levels. It is often referred to as the Childish Skills. The skill becomes harder to master, once the bones are set.
