= Warming up =

Stretching and preparation for physical activity

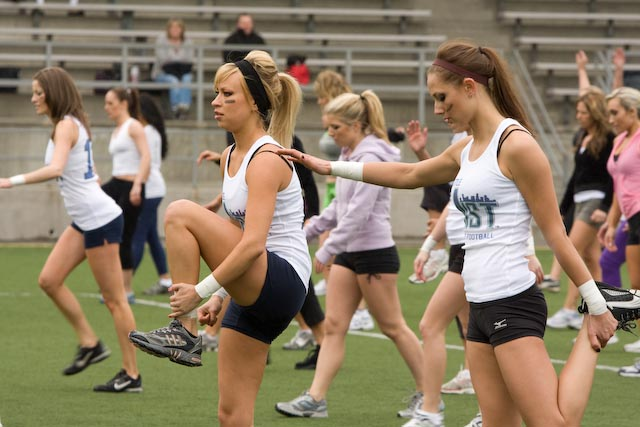
Players of Legends Football League do a warm-up exercise, US

Warming up is a part of stretching and preparation for physical exertion or a performance by exercising or practicing gently beforehand, usually undertaken before a performance or practice. Athletes, singers, actors and others warm up before stressing their muscles. It is widely believed to prepare the muscles for vigorous actions and to prevent muscle cramps and injury due to overexertion.

== Exercise ==
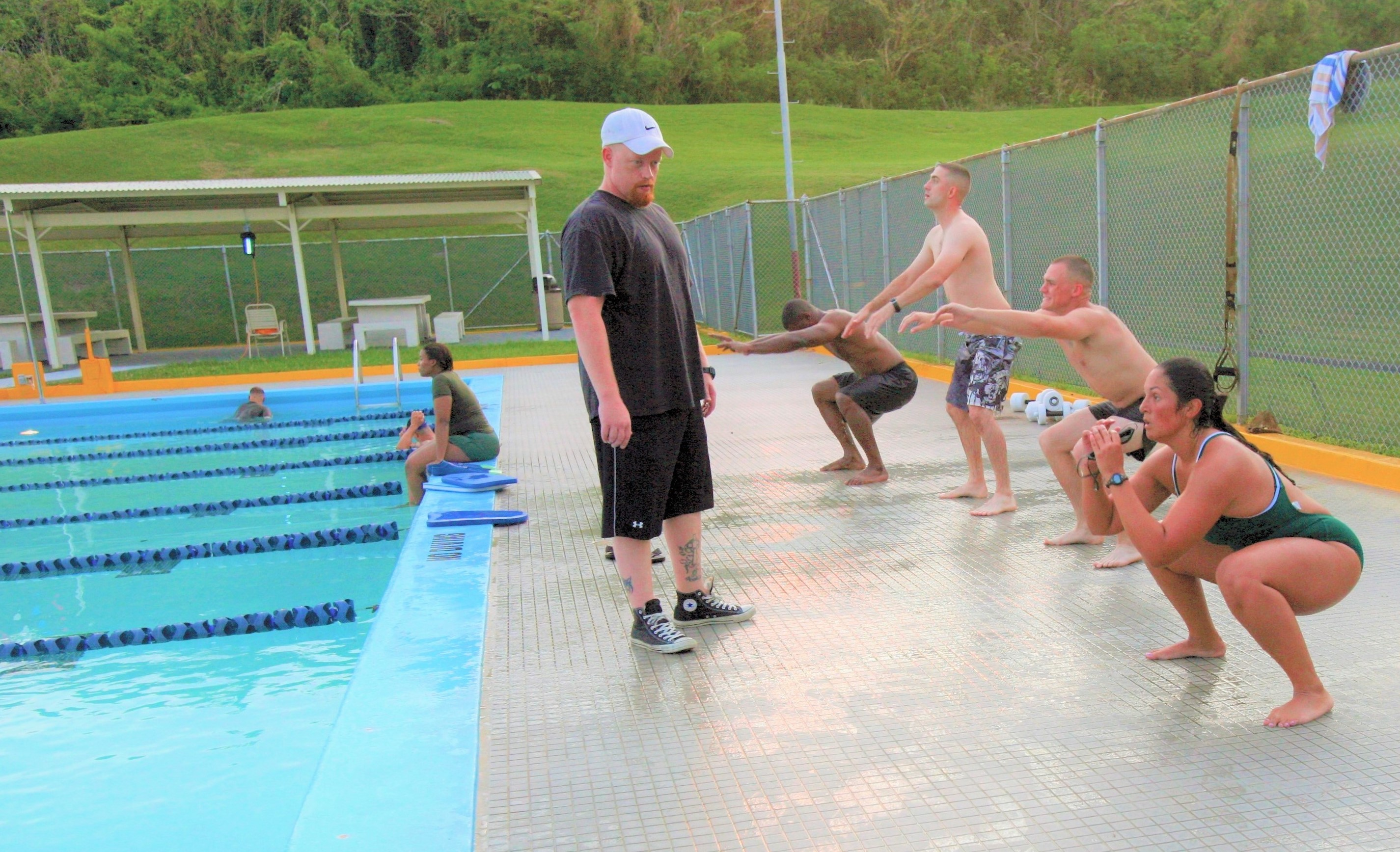
Swimmers perform squats prior to entering the pool in a U.S. military base, 2011

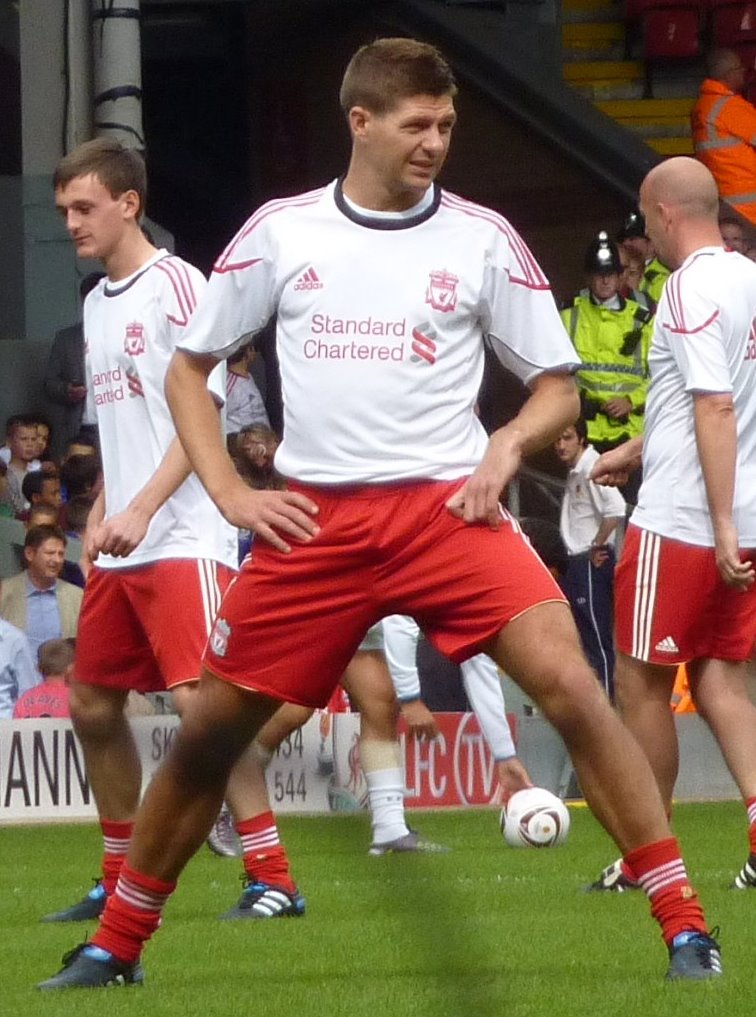
Steven Gerrard warming up prior to a football match in 2010.

A warm-up generally consists of a gradual increase in intensity in physical activity (a "pulse raiser"), joint mobility exercise, and stretching, followed by the activity. For example, before running or playing an intensive sport, athletes might slowly jog to warm their muscles and increase their heart rate. It is important that warm-ups be specific to the activity, so that the muscles to be used are activated. The risks and benefits of combining stretching with warming up are disputable, although it is generally believed that warming up prepares the athlete both mentally and physically.

== Stretching ==
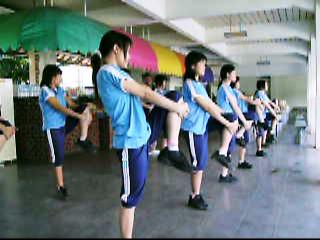
A group of high school girls performing a ballistic stretch in a physical education session

Stretching is part of some warm-up routines, although a study in 2013 indicates that it weakens muscles in that situation. There are 2 types of stretches: static and dynamic:

- Static Stretches involve flexing the muscles. This may help preventing injury and permit greater flexibility and agility. But it isn't recommended to do as part of a warmup: Note that static stretching for too long may weaken the muscles.
- Dynamic Stretching involves moving the body part in the desired way until reaching the full range of motion, to improve performance. This type of stretching is recommended as a part of a warm-up.

== Warming up in other contexts ==
Psychologists, educators, singers, and similar professionals use warm-ups in therapeutic or learning sessions before starting or after a break; these warm-ups can include vocal and physical exercises, interactive and improvisational games, role plays, etc. A vocal warm-up can be especially important for actors and singers.

== Benefits ==
=== Preventing injury ===
There is contradictory evidence in terms of benefits of comprehensive warm-ups for preventing injury in football (soccer) players, with some studies showing some benefit while other showing no benefit. It has been suggested that it is specifically warm ups aimed at increasing body temperature, rather than targeting stretching, which can prevent injury.

=== Increasing performance ===
In baseball, warm-up swings using a standard weight bat are effective in increasing batting speed. In a 2010 meta-analysis, the authors concluded that in about four-fifths of the studies there was improvement in performance with various physical activities with warm-ups as opposed to without warm-ups. An increase in body temperature, specifically in the muscles, improves explosive skeletal muscle performance (e.g., jumping and sprinting).

== Environmental factors ==
It is important to those who live in cold regions, or during winter seasons that athletes warm-up longer and preferably early morning hours rather than evenings.

== See also ==
- Cooling down
- Sportswear
