= Foam roller =

Therapeutic exercise device

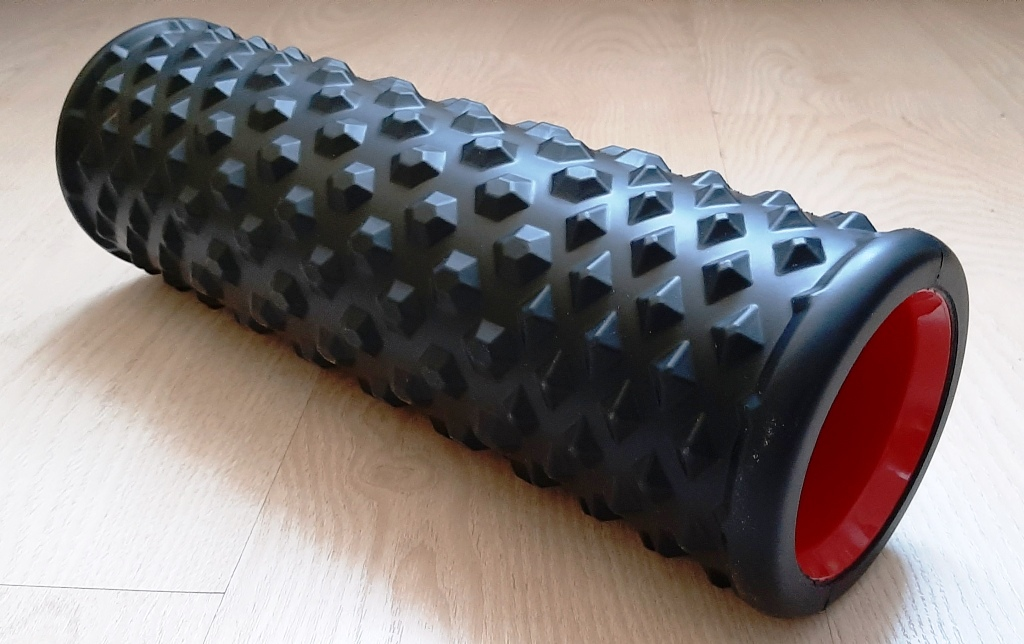
Foam roller

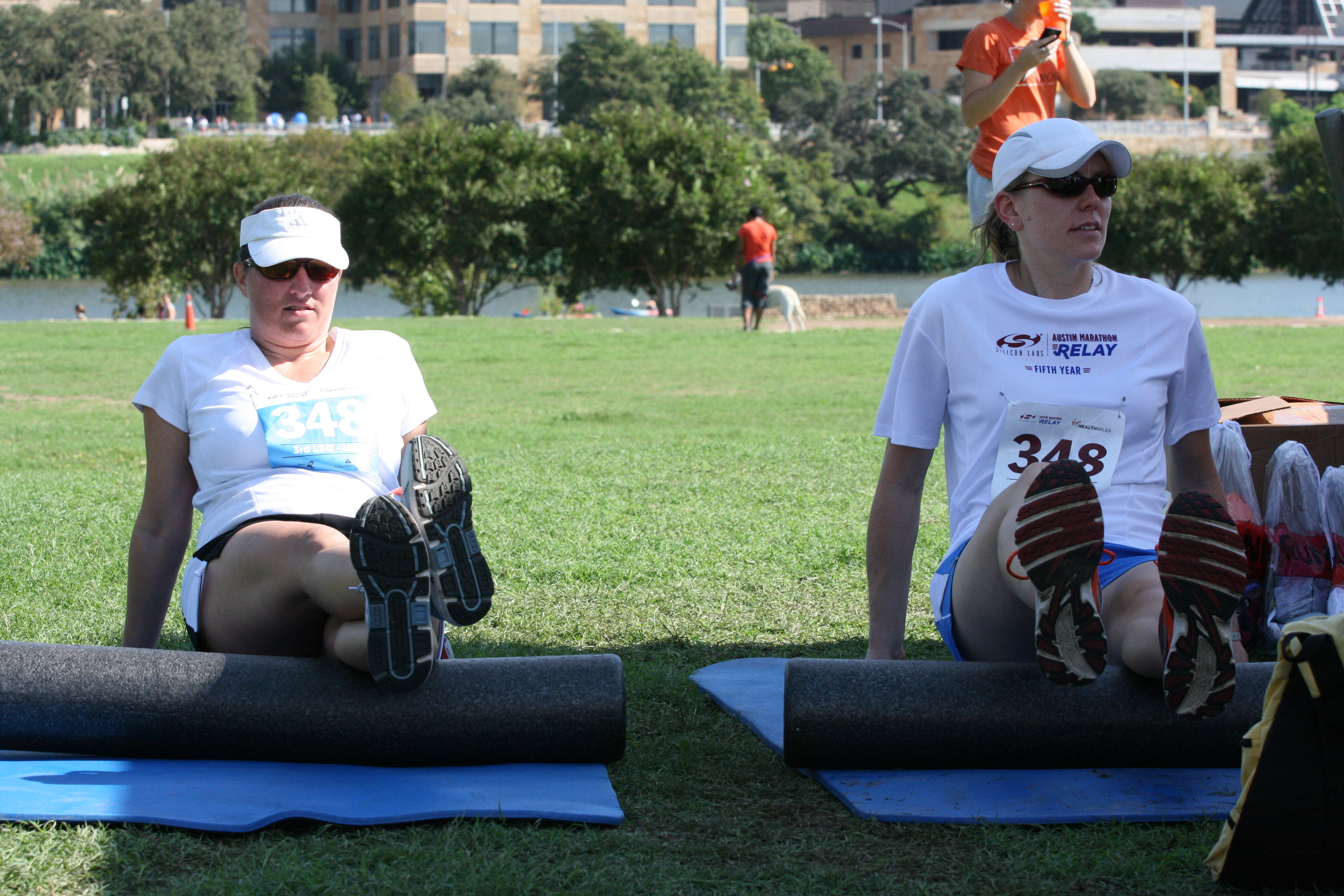
Exercises

A foam roller is a lightweight, cylindrical tube of elastomeric foam used for massaging one's own muscles. The roller is placed between the target muscle and the ground, and is rolled back and forth, using body weight for pressure. Rollers come in different sizes and various degrees of firmness. The firmness (often identified by the color) can range from soft to firm, soft being best for beginners.

It may be used for many reasons, including increasing flexibility, reducing soreness, and eliminating muscle knots. Foam rolling is a method of self-myofascial release. Foam rollers have a short term positive impact in the range of motion of joints, but benefits for long-term performance or range of motion are unknown.

Combining foam rolling and stretching does not cause a significant impact in range of motion compared to only foam rolling or stretching. However, if stretching is done after foam rolling, then there is a “significantly but trivial better effect than stretching alone”. A 2021 meta-analysis concluded that "evidence seems to justify the widespread use of foam rolling as a warm-up activity rather than a recovery tool", while arguing that post exercise or recovery rolling reduced muscle pain perception. A 2019 review concluded that 90 seconds of foam rolling per muscle group may be the minimum needed to achieve a reduction in muscle pain or soreness in the short term but that there is insufficient evidence for the optimal amount.
