= Stretching =

Form of physical exercise

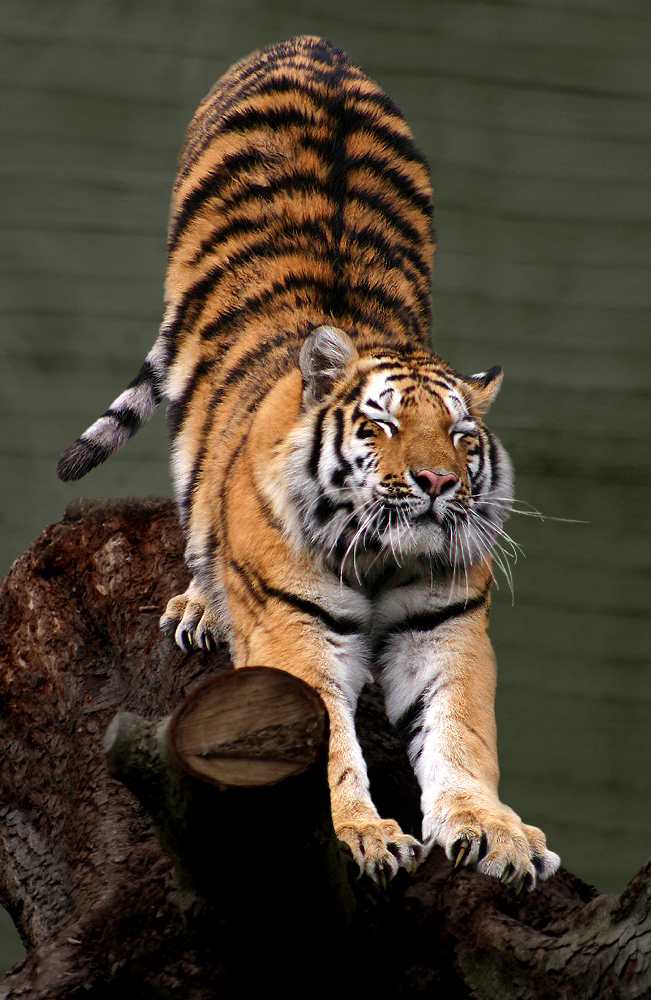
A stretching Siberian tiger

Stretching is a form of physical exercise in which a specific muscle or tendon (or muscle group) is deliberately expanded and flexed in order to improve the muscle's felt elasticity and achieve comfortable muscle tone. The result is a feeling of increased muscle control, flexibility, and range of motion. Stretching is also used therapeutically to alleviate cramps and to improve function in daily activities by increasing range of motion.

In its most basic form, stretching is a natural and instinctive activity; it is performed by humans and many other animals. It can be accompanied by yawning. Stretching often occurs instinctively after waking from sleep, after long periods of inactivity, or after exiting confined spaces and areas. In addition to vertebrates (e.g. mammals and birds), spiders have also been found to exhibit stretching.

Increasing flexibility through stretching is one of the basic tenets of physical fitness. It is common for athletes to stretch before (for warming up) and after exercise in an attempt to reduce risk of injury and increase performance.

Stretching can be dangerous when performed incorrectly. There are many techniques for stretching in general, but depending on which muscle group is being stretched, some techniques may be ineffective or detrimental, even to the point of causing hypermobility, instability, or permanent damage to the tendons, ligaments, and muscle fiber. The physiological nature of stretching and theories about the effect of various techniques are therefore subject to heavy inquiry.

Although static stretching is part of some warm-up routines, long duration pre-exercise static stretching can temporarily reduce an individual's overall muscular strength and maximal performance, regardless of an individual's age, sex, or training status. For this reason, an active dynamic warm-up is recommended before exercise in place of static stretching.

== Physiology ==
Studies have shed light on the function, in stretching, of a large protein within the myofibrils of skeletal muscles named titin. A study performed by Magid and Law demonstrated that the origin of passive muscle tension (which occurs during stretching) is actually within the myofibrils, not extracellularly as had previously been supposed. Due to neurological safeguards against injury such as the Golgi tendon reflex, it is normally impossible for adults to stretch most muscle groups to their fullest length without training due to the activation of muscle antagonists as the muscle reaches the limit of its normal range of motion.

There are currently two explanations for how stretching increases flexibility. The first and most accepted theory pertains to sensory perception (i.e., sensory theory), which proposes that chronic exposure to stretching results in an increased stretch tolerance. More specifically, it has been argued that the MTU can tolerate more passive tension after training owing to a modification of the subjective perception of discomfort, probably caused by adaptions at the level of nociceptive endings. The second is called ‘mechanical theory’, which assumes that stretching protocols decrease joint resistance to a stretch probably because of a change in MTU mechanical properties (e.g., decrease in tissues stiffness), geometry (e.g., the addition of sarcomeres in series and increase in fascicle length), or both. While there is some evidence for both of these explanations, the roles of these mechanisms are not currently well understood.

== Psychology ==
Stretching has been recognized for its potential to positively influence both cognitive function and mood. Research indicates that engaging in stretching exercises may lead to a reduction in feelings of anxiety, depression, hostility, fatigue, and confusion, particularly among individuals with sedentary lifestyles. These improvements in mood have been observed to correlate with enhancements in cognitive function. For individuals who often spend prolonged periods engaged in sedentary activities, integrating stretching into their daily routines may prove beneficial. Doing so not only addresses physical tension but also promotes mental well-being. Regular stretching has been associated with decreased levels of anxiety and depression, alongside increased vigor, which could activate brain regions associated with improved cognitive abilities.

== Types of stretches ==
Stretches can be either static or dynamic. Static stretches are performed while stationary and dynamic stretches involve movement of the muscle. Stretches can also be active or passive, where active stretches use internal forces generated by the body to perform a stretch and passive stretches involve forces from external objects or people to perform the stretch. They can involve both passive and active components.

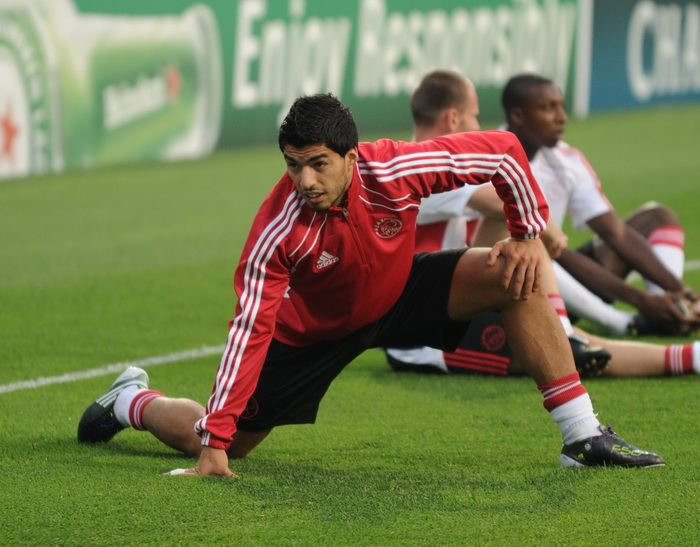
Football player Luis Suárez stretching prior to a match.

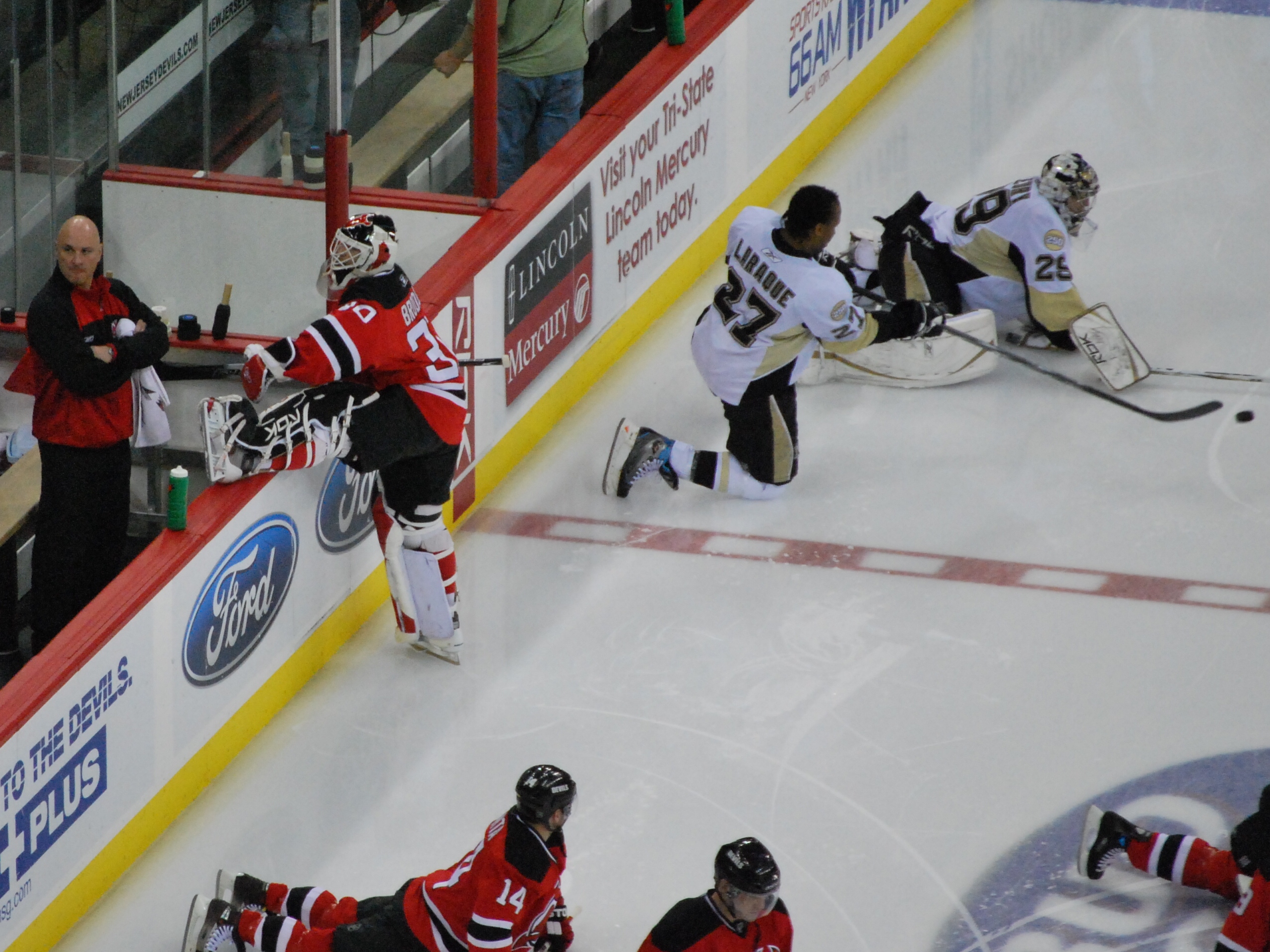
Martin Brodeur stretching during warmups.

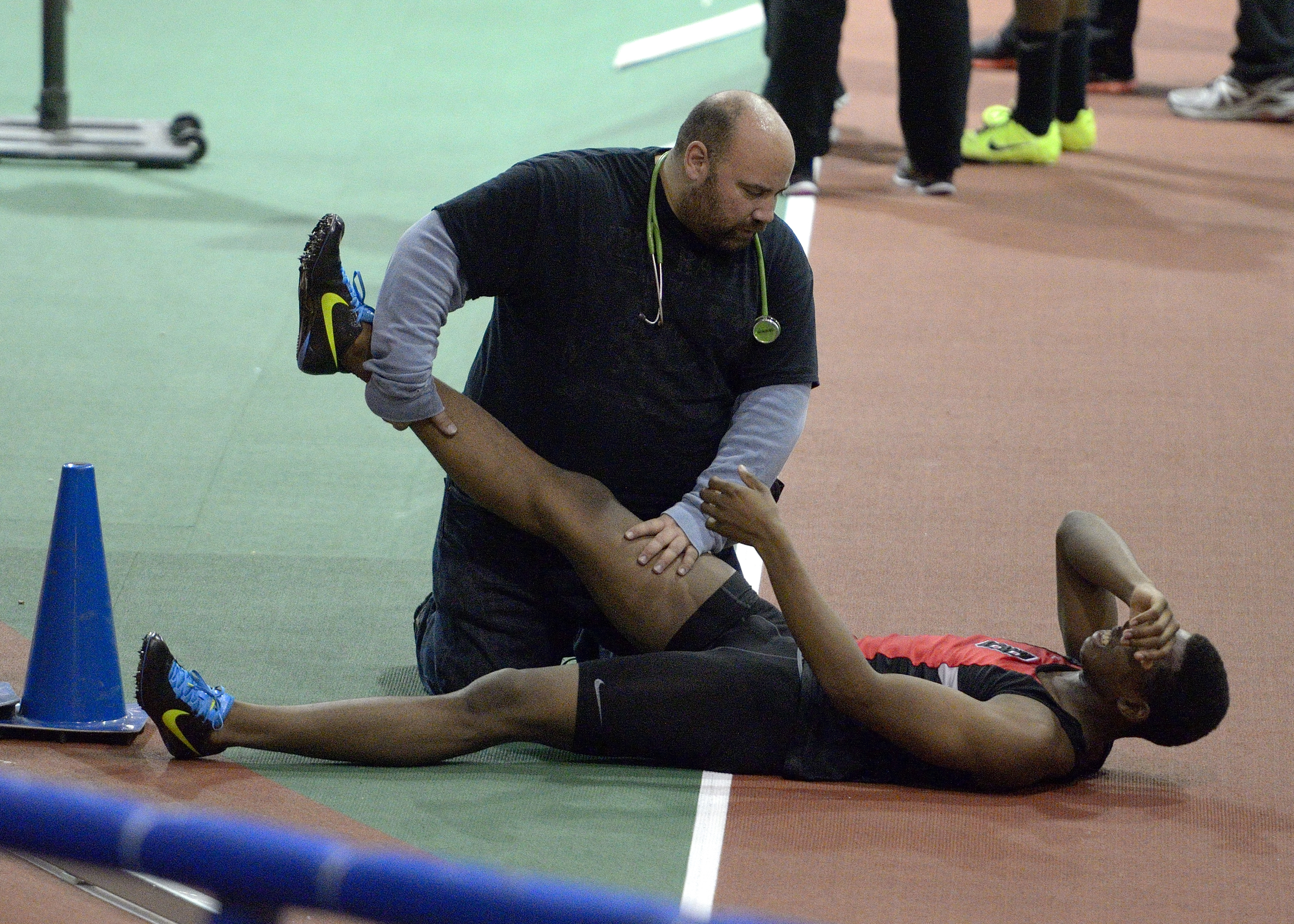
Assisted stretching may be performed when the athlete is unable to stretch optimally independently. For example, during cramping of the hamstrings, assistance in stretching out the muscles may help.

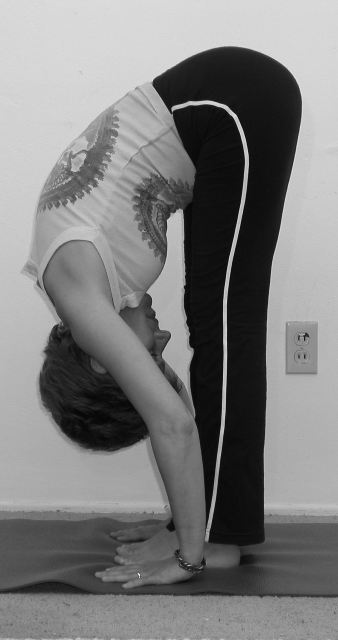
Asana stretching in yoga

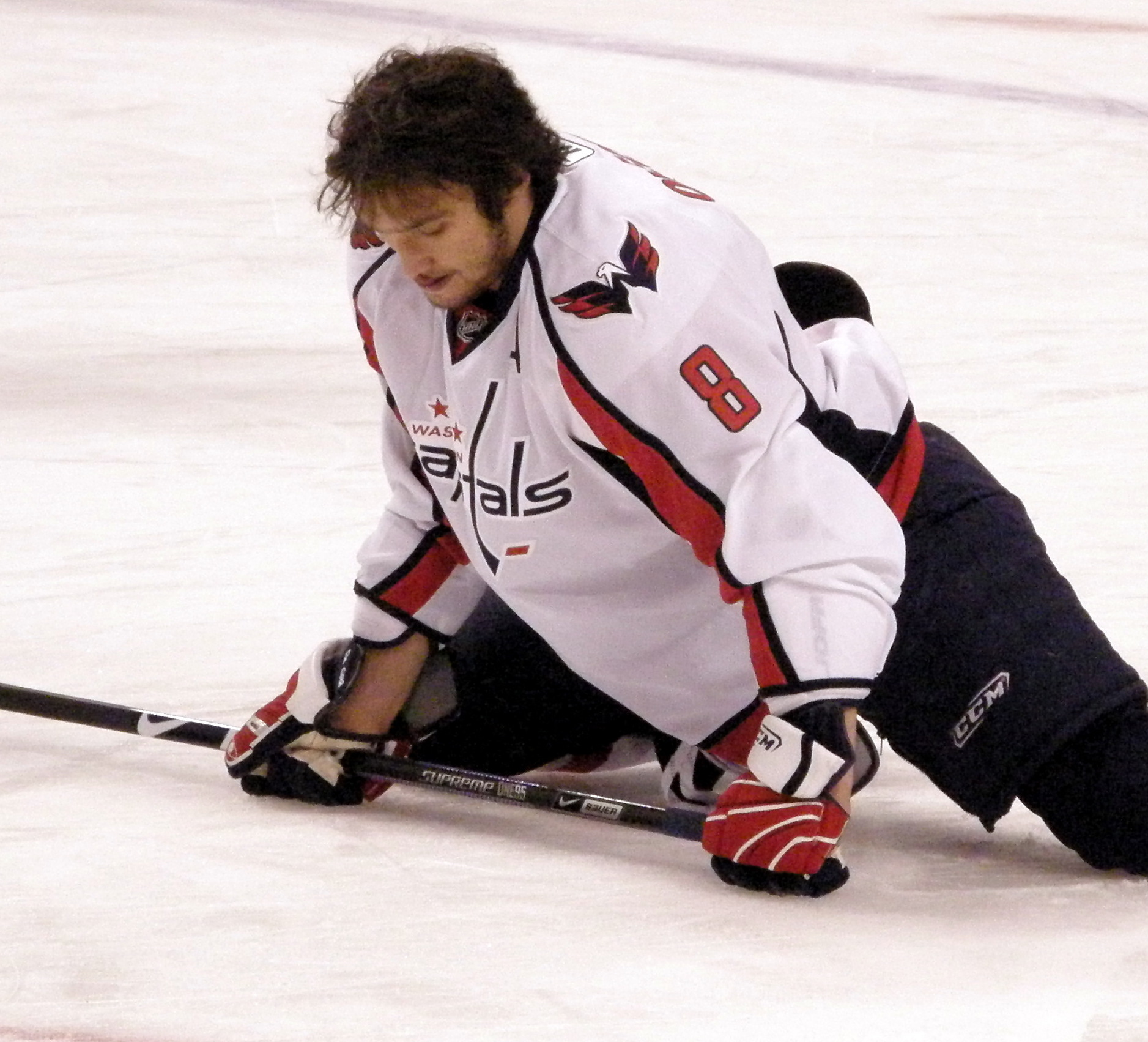
Alex Ovechkin stretching groin

=== Dynamic stretching ===
Dynamic stretching is a movement-based stretch aimed at increasing blood flow throughout the body while also loosening up the muscle fibers. Standard dynamic stretches typically involve slow and controlled active contraction of muscles. An example of such a dynamic stretch is lunges. Another form of dynamic stretching is ballistic stretching, which is an active stretch that involves bouncing or swinging back and forth at a high speed in order to take a muscle beyond its typical range of motion using momentum. Ballistic stretching can also be performed with tools such as resistance bands to increase the intention between sets in order to quickly warm-up the body. Ballistic stretching may cause damage to the joints.

=== Static stretching ===
The simplest static stretches are static–passive stretches, according to research findings. This brings the joint to its end range of motion and hold it there using external forces. There are more advanced forms of static stretching, such as proprioceptive neuromuscular facilitation (PNF), which involves both active muscle contractions and passive external forces. PNF stretching utilizes an aspect of neuromuscular reeducation, which may yield better results than regular static stretching in terms of induced strength. PNF stretching may involve contracting either the antagonist muscles, agonist muscles, or both (CRAC). The efficacy of PNF stretching and its recommendation of use may be dependent on stretching-to-performance duration.

== Effects of stretching ==
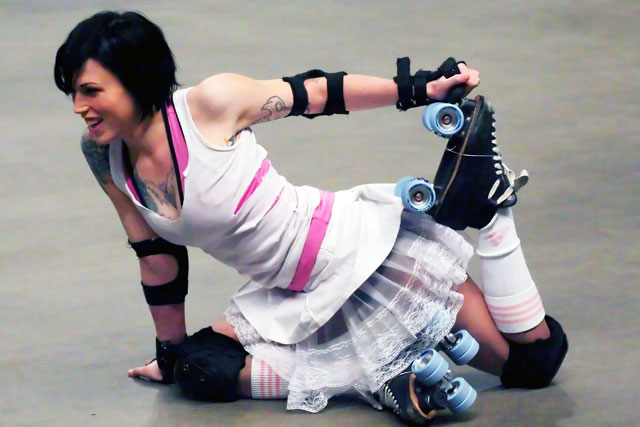
A roller derby athlete stretching

=== Flexibility ===
Stretching's primary effect is to increase flexibility. Flexibility is commonly measured by the angle a joint can move to, or its "range of motion" (ROM). All types of stretching increase range of motion, but static stretching and PNF stretching have been shown to be the more effective than dynamic and ballistic stretching for increasing range of motion.

While stretching is effective at increasing ROM it is not the only way to do so. Other exercise like strength training can also increase ROM.

=== Strength ===
Stretching is commonly used as part of a dynamic warm up routine before athletic activities. While there is some disagreement to whether a dynamic warm up benefits athletic performance, several studies have shown short term gains in muscle strength after a dynamic warm up: specifically in sprint time, vertical jump height and baseball bat swing speed.

Static stretching can potentially reduce muscle power in subsequent athletic activities if performed for a long time (60+ seconds). Shorter durations of static stretching don't seem to meaningfully impair muscle strength.

Over the long term, stretching has the potential to slightly increase muscle strength and power, but the effect is stronger on sedentary people than active people.

=== Reducing injury risk ===
Dynamic stretching as part of a dynamic warm up has been shown to decrease injury risk in volleyball players, soccer players, and basketball players.

However, stretching alone is not known to prevent general injury risk, since current evidence is controversial. Static stretching has been shown to decrease muscle injury risk, but also increase bone and joint injury risk.

=== Muscle soreness ===
Delayed onset muscle soreness also known as DOMS, typically arises 48 hours after an exercise bout. While stretching may provide some psychological value to people for those experiencing muscle soreness there is no evidence or theoretical foundation showing that stretching decreases muscle soreness.

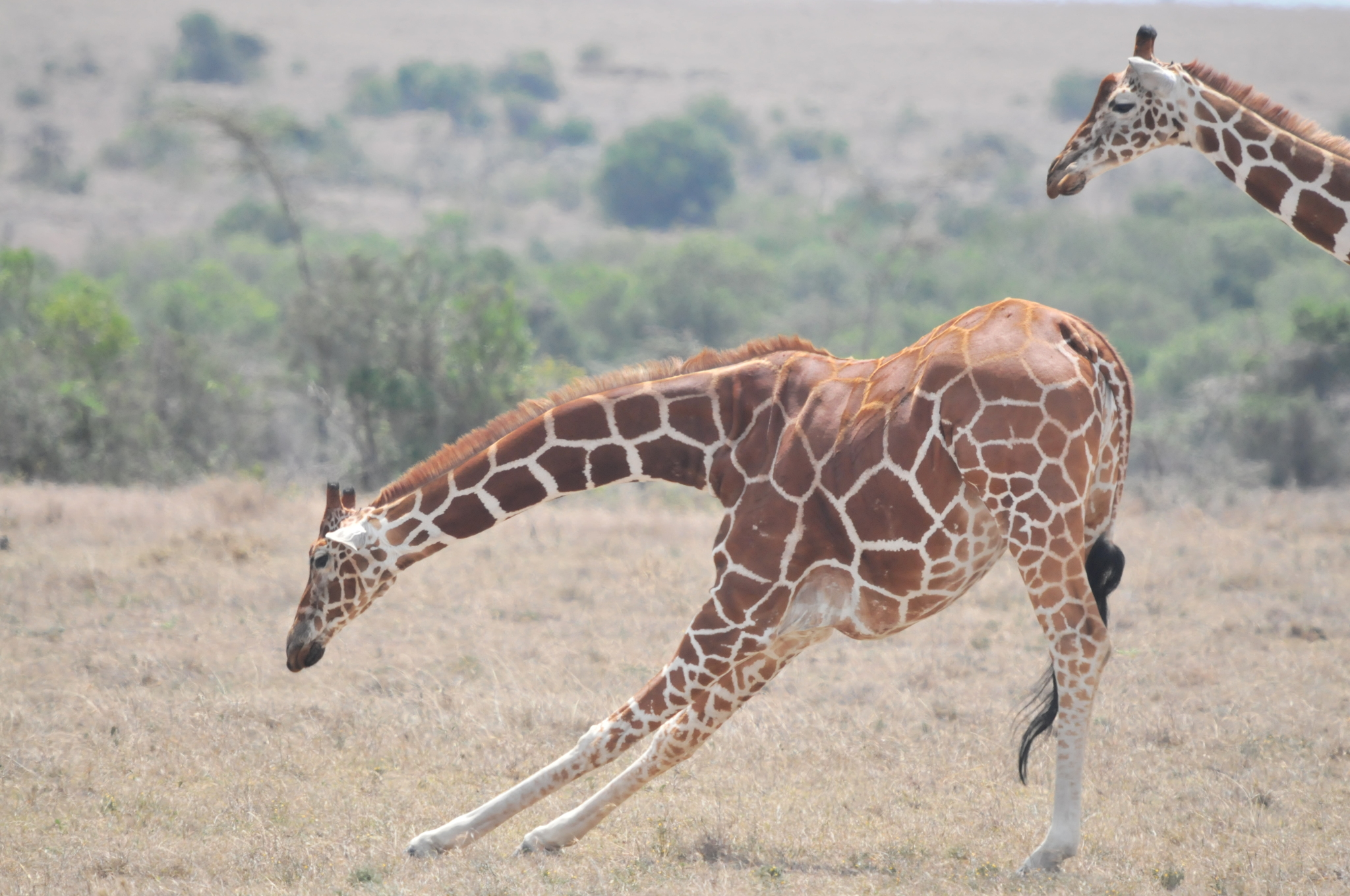
A stretching giraffe

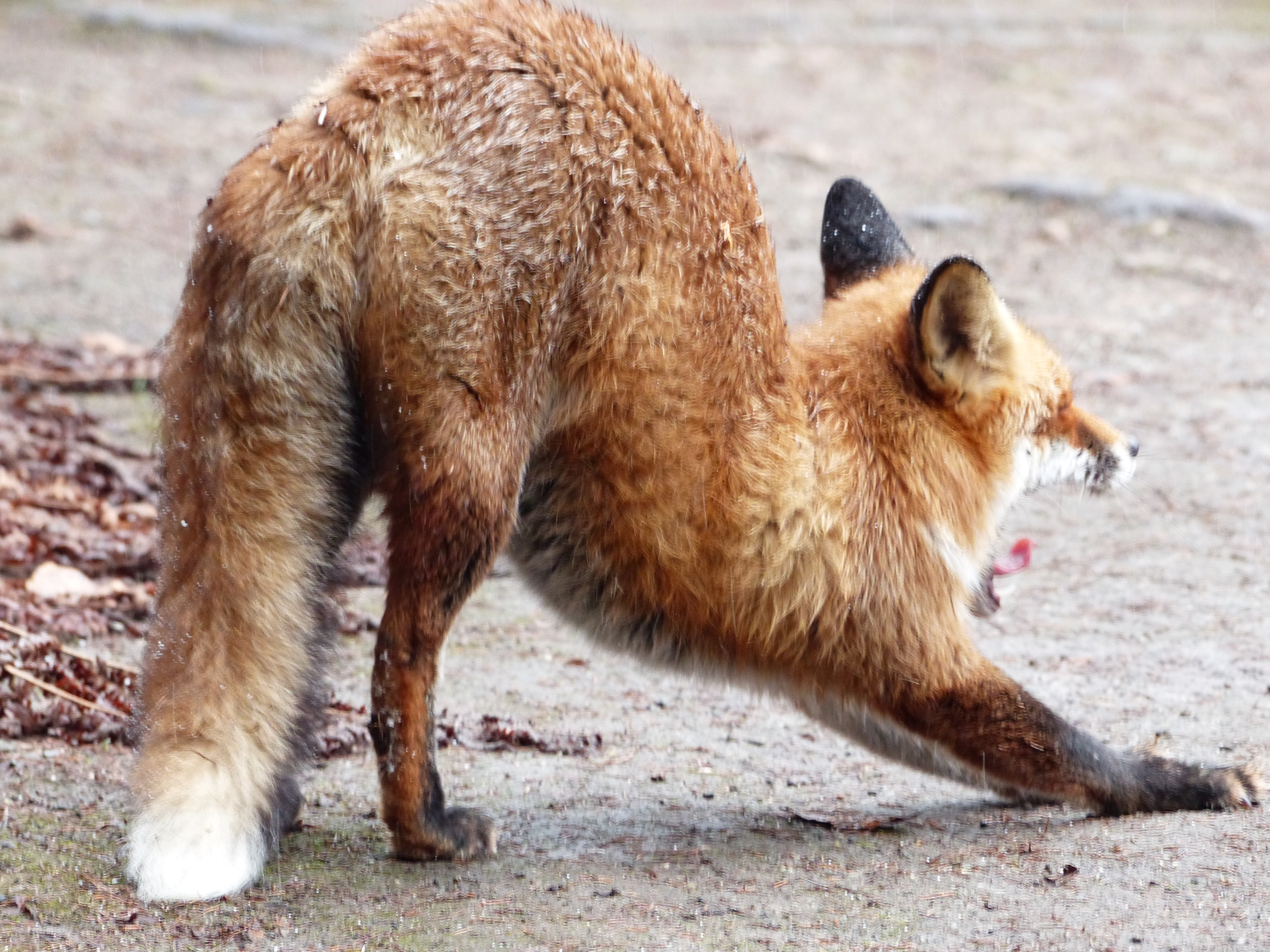
A stretching red fox

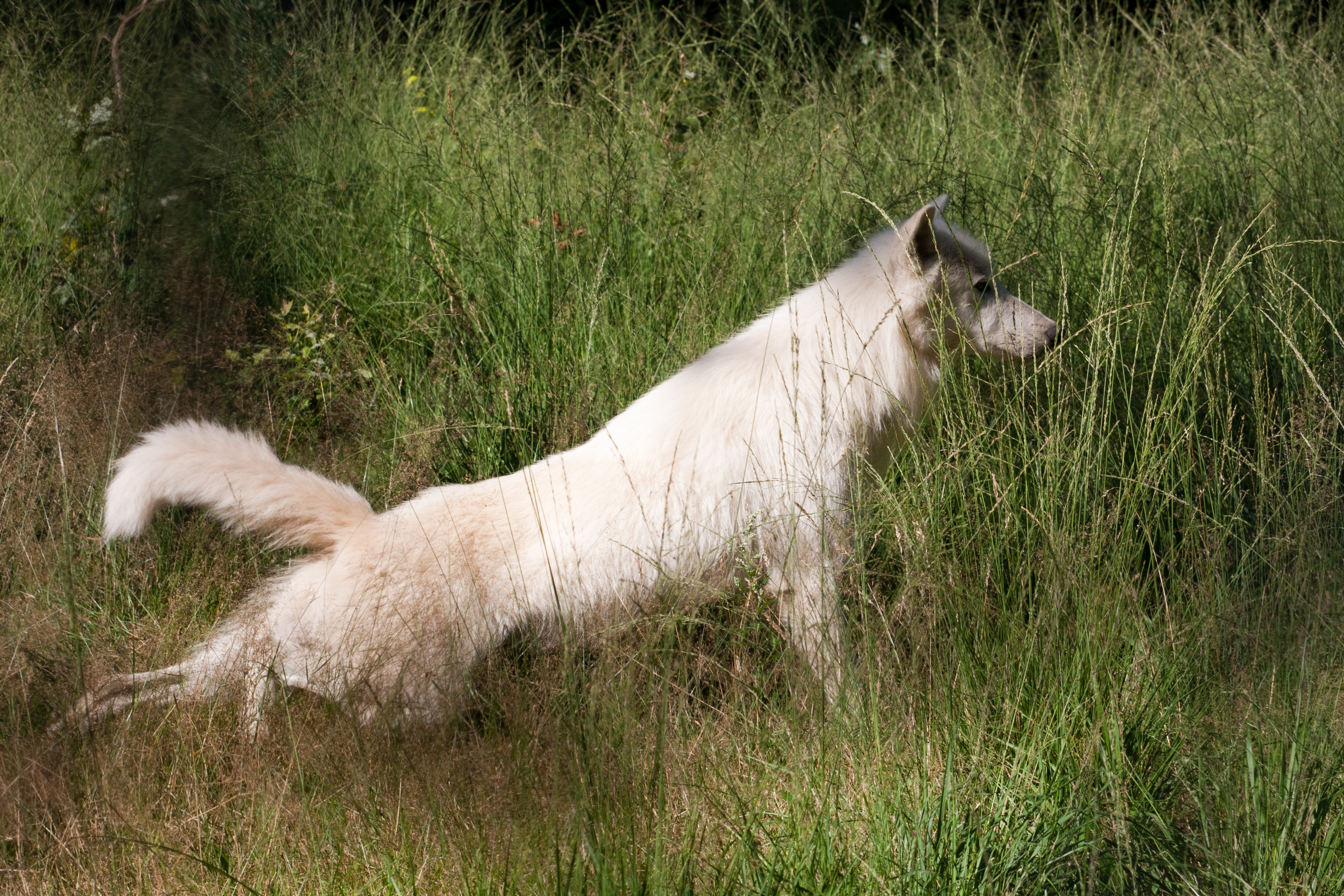
A stretching wolf

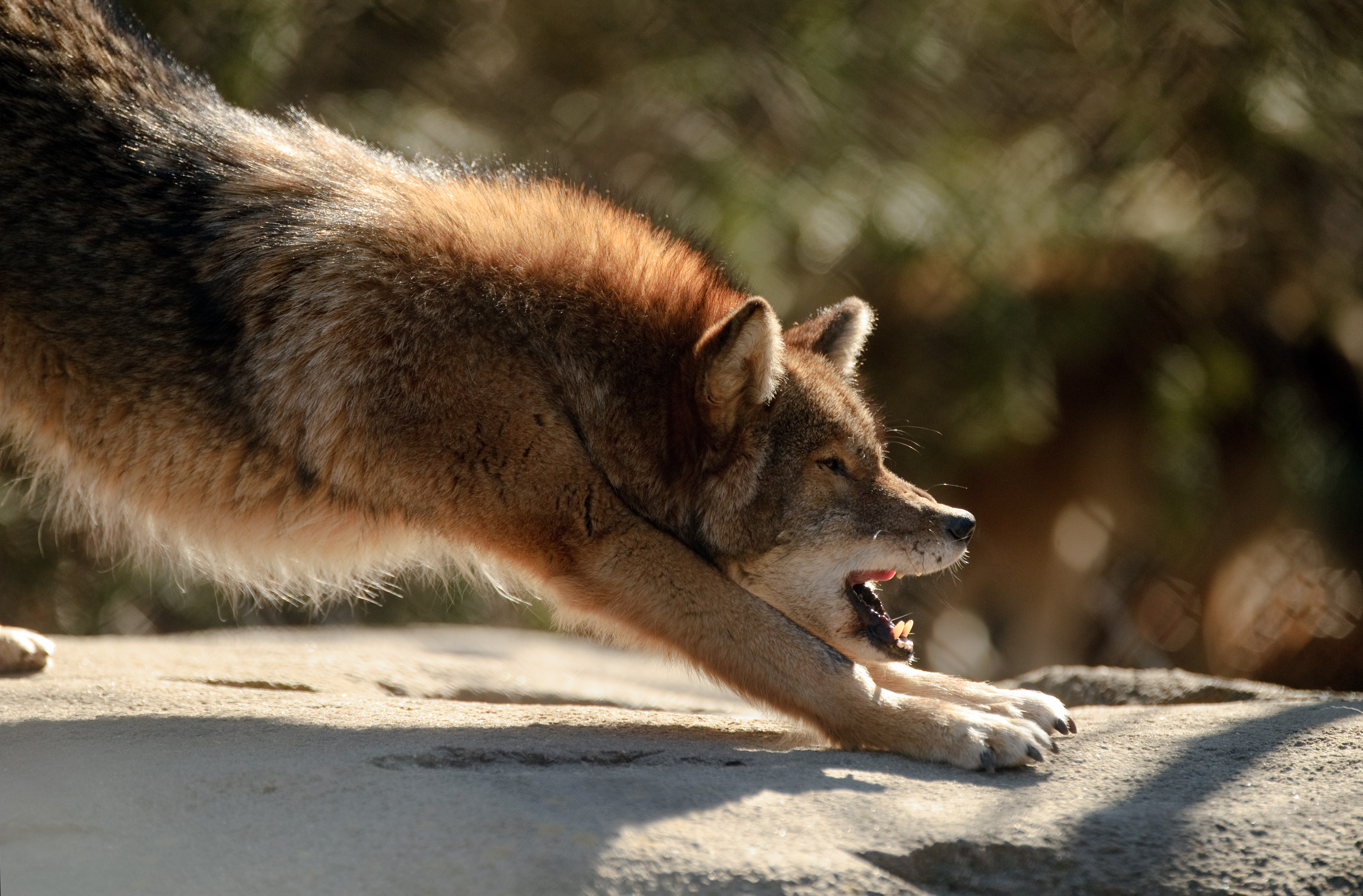
A stretching coyote

== See also ==
- Foam roller
