= Myofascial pain syndrome =

- Other names: Chronic myofascial pain, myofascial pain and dysfunction syndrome (MPDS or MFPDS)
- Specialty: Rheumatology
- Differential diagnosis: Giant cell arteritis, arthritis

Myofascial pain syndrome (MPS), also known as chronic myofascial pain (CMP), is a syndrome characterized by chronic pain in multiple myofascial trigger points ("knots") and fascial (connective tissue) constrictions. It can appear in any body part. Symptoms of a myofascial trigger point include: focal point tenderness, reproduction of pain upon trigger point palpation, hardening of the muscle upon trigger point palpation, pseudo-weakness of the involved muscle, referred pain, and limited range of motion following approximately 5 seconds of sustained trigger point pressure.

The cause is believed to be muscle tension or spasms within the affected musculature. However, emerging evidence suggests that fascial tissue and its biomechanical and neurophysiological properties may also contribute to the development and persistence of myofascial pain. Diagnosis is based on the symptoms and possible sleep studies.

Treatment may include pain medication, physical therapy, mouth guards, and occasionally benzodiazepine. It is a relatively common cause of temporomandibular pain.

== Signs and symptoms ==
Primary symptoms include:

- Localized muscle pain
- Trigger points that activate the pain (MTrPs)

Generally speaking, the muscular pain is steady, aching, and deep. Depending on the case and location the intensity can range from mild discomfort to excruciating and "lightning-like". Knots may be visible or felt beneath the skin. The pain does not resolve on its own, even after typical first-aid self-care such as ice, heat, and rest. Electromyography (EMG) has been used to identify abnormal motor neuron activity in the affected region.

A physical exam usually reveals palpable trigger points in affected muscles and taut bands corresponding to the contracted muscles. The trigger points are exquisitely tender spots on the taut bands.

== Causes ==
The causes of MPS are not fully documented or understood. At least one study rules out trigger points: "The theory of myofascial pain syndrome (MPS) caused by trigger points (TrPs) ... has been refuted. This is not to deny the existence of the clinical phenomena themselves, for which scientifically sound and logically plausible explanations based on known neurophysiological phenomena can be advanced." Some systemic diseases, such as connective tissue disease, can cause MPS. Poor posture and emotional disturbance might also instigate or contribute to MPS.

== Diagnosis ==
Diagnosis is generally based on the symptoms and possible sleep studies.

=== Comparison with fibromyalgia ===
Myofascial pain syndrome (MPS) is commonly confused with fibromyalgia (FM) as their presentation is similar. However, fibromyalgia is typically associated with fatigue, depression and cognitive dysfunction. The anatomic distribution and characteristic of the pain also differ. While the fibromyalgia pain is generalized, bilateral and typically involving muscles above and below the waist, the MPS pain affects a particular region of the body such as the mandible or the shoulders. The MTrPs found in MPS present overt palpable nodular structures within the muscle, while aside from tenderness, the trigger points in FM are indistinguishable from surrounding tissue.

However, there are some challenges distinguishing these syndromes:

- Difficulty differentiating FM trigger points from myofascial trigger points
- Poor reliability in detecting taut bands
- MPS may become generalized over time thus mimicking FM

== Treatment ==
Massage therapy using trigger-point release techniques may be effective in short-term pain relief. Physical therapy involving gentle stretching and exercise may be useful for recovering full range of motion and motor coordination. Once the trigger points are gone, muscle strengthening exercise can begin, supporting long-term health of the local muscle system.

Myofascial release, which involves gentle fascia manipulation and massage, may improve or remediate the condition.

A systematic review concluded that dry needling for the treatment of myofascial pain syndrome in the lower back appeared to be a useful adjunct to standard therapies, but that clear recommendations could not be made because the published studies were small and of low quality.

Posture evaluation and ergonomics may provide relief in the early stages of treatment. Gentle, sustained stretching exercises within a comfortable range of motion have been shown to lessen symptoms. Regular, non-intense activity is also encouraged.

== Sources ==
- Starlanyl DJ, Copeland ME (2001). Fibromyalgia & Chronic Myofascial Pain: A Survival Manual (2nd ed.). Oakland, CA: New Harbinger Publications. ISBN 978-1-57224-238-8.
