= Flexibility (anatomy) =

Anatomical range of movement of a joint or series of joints

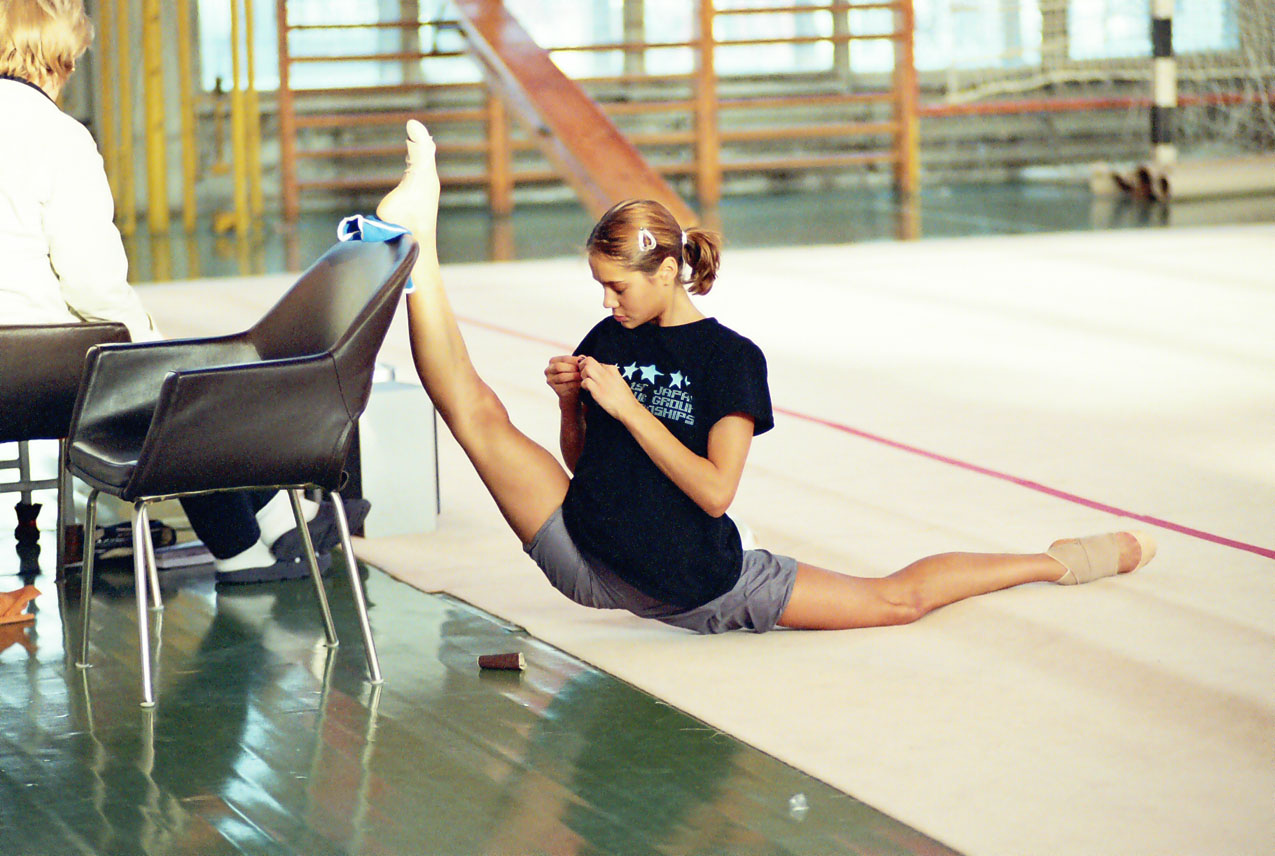
An oversplit by former Olympic gymnast Irina Tchachina

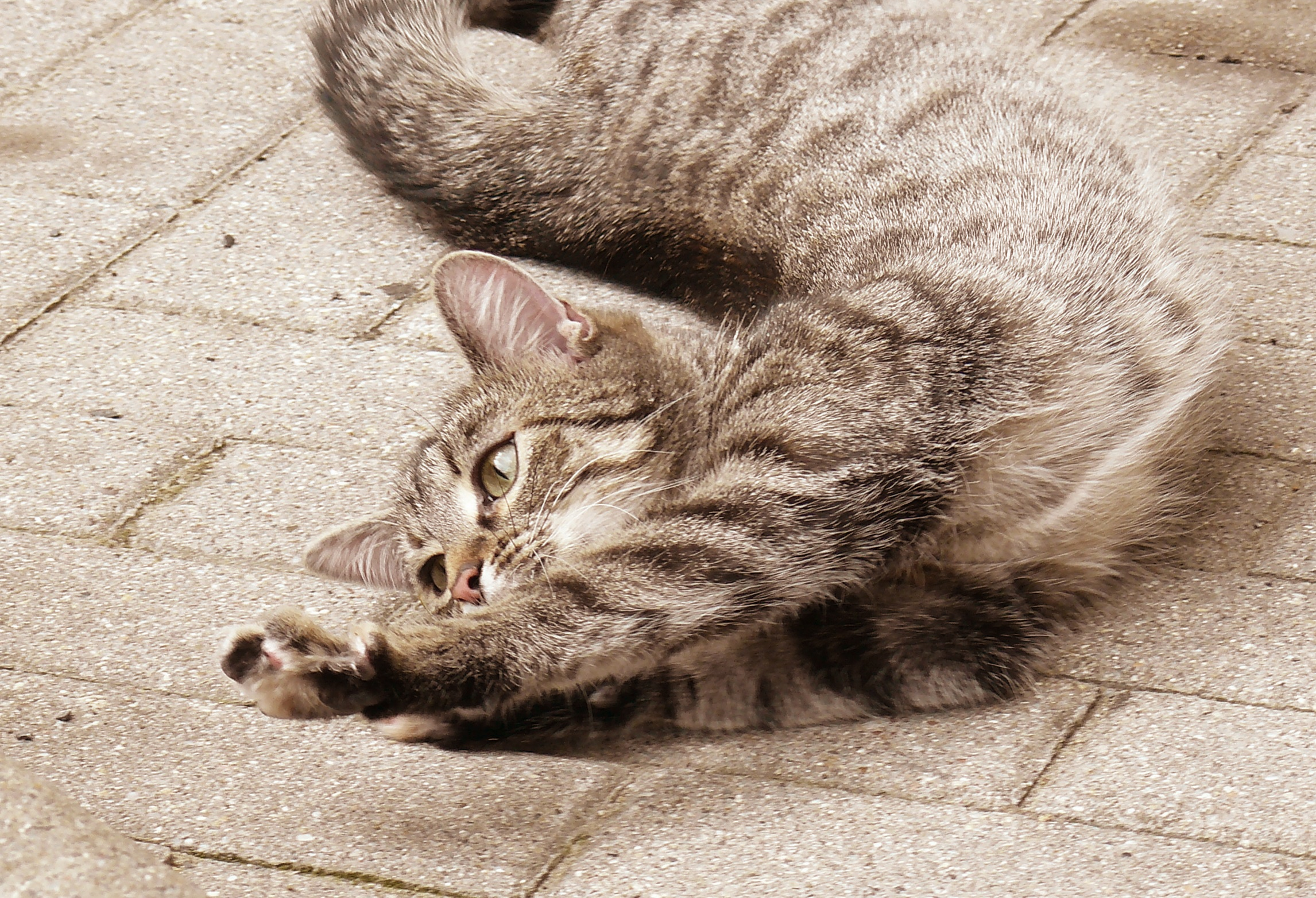
Stretching cat

Flexibility is the anatomical range of movement in a joint or series of joints, and length in muscles that cross the joints to induce a bending movement or motion. Flexibility varies between individuals, particularly in terms of differences in muscle length of multi-joint muscles. Flexibility in some joints can be increased to a certain degree by exercising, with stretching being a common exercise component to maintain or improve flexibility.

Limberness is the condition of having flexibility to a positive or superior degree, which is also spoken of as a person having flexibility or being flexible.

== Anatomical elements ==
=== Joints ===
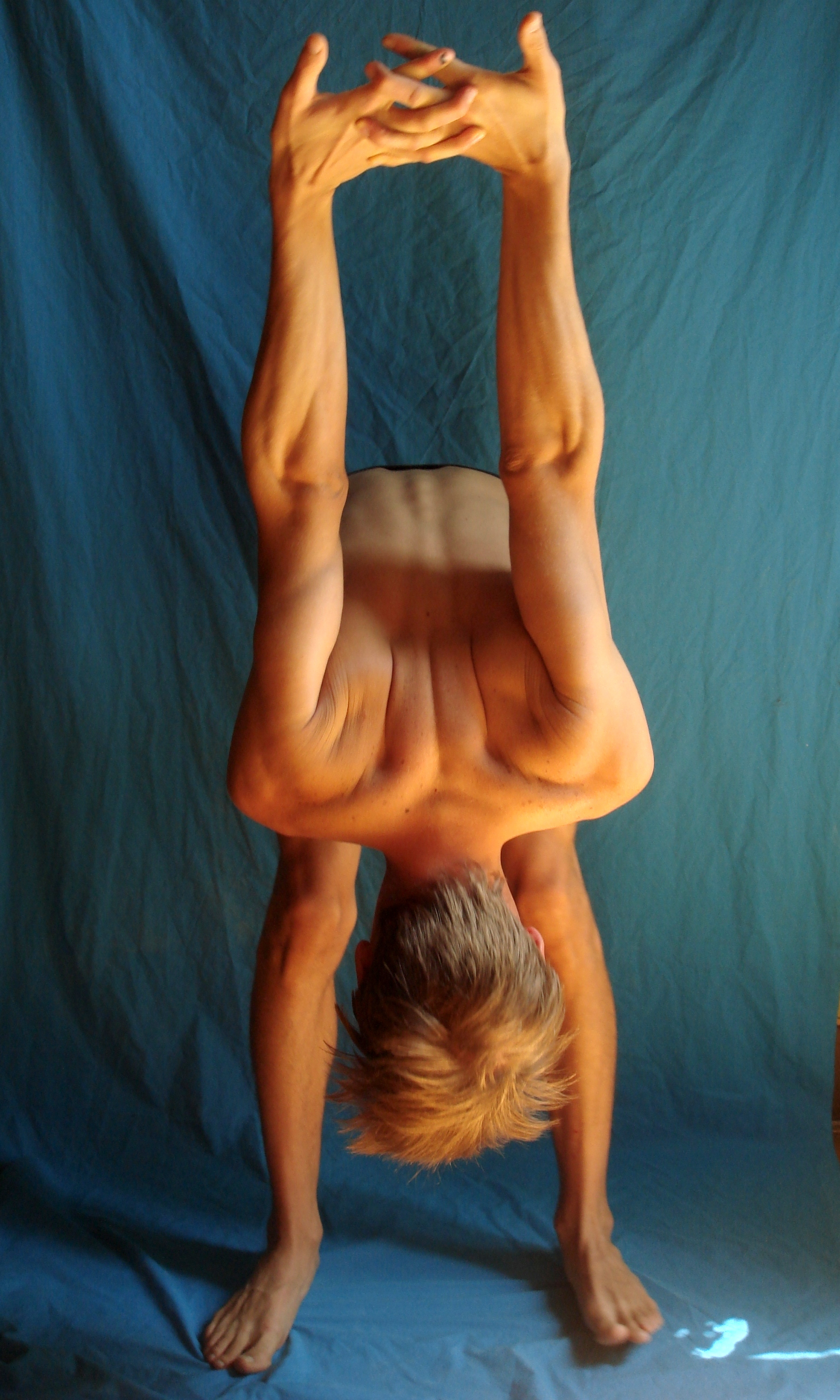
Man stretching

The joints in a human body are surrounded by synovial membranes and articular cartilage which cover, cushion and nourish the joint and surfaces of each. Increasing muscular elasticity of the joint's range of mobility increases flexibility.

=== Ligaments ===
Ligaments are composed of two different tissues: white and yellow. The white fibrous tissues are not stretchy, but are extremely strong so that even if the bone were fractured the tissue would remain in place. The white tissue allows subjective freedom of movement. The yellow elastic tissue can be stretched considerably and return to its original length.

=== Tendons ===
Tendons are not elastic and are even less stretchy. Tendons are categorized as a connective tissue. Connective tissue supports, surrounds, and binds the muscle fibres. They contain both elastic and non-elastic tissue.

=== Areolar tissue ===
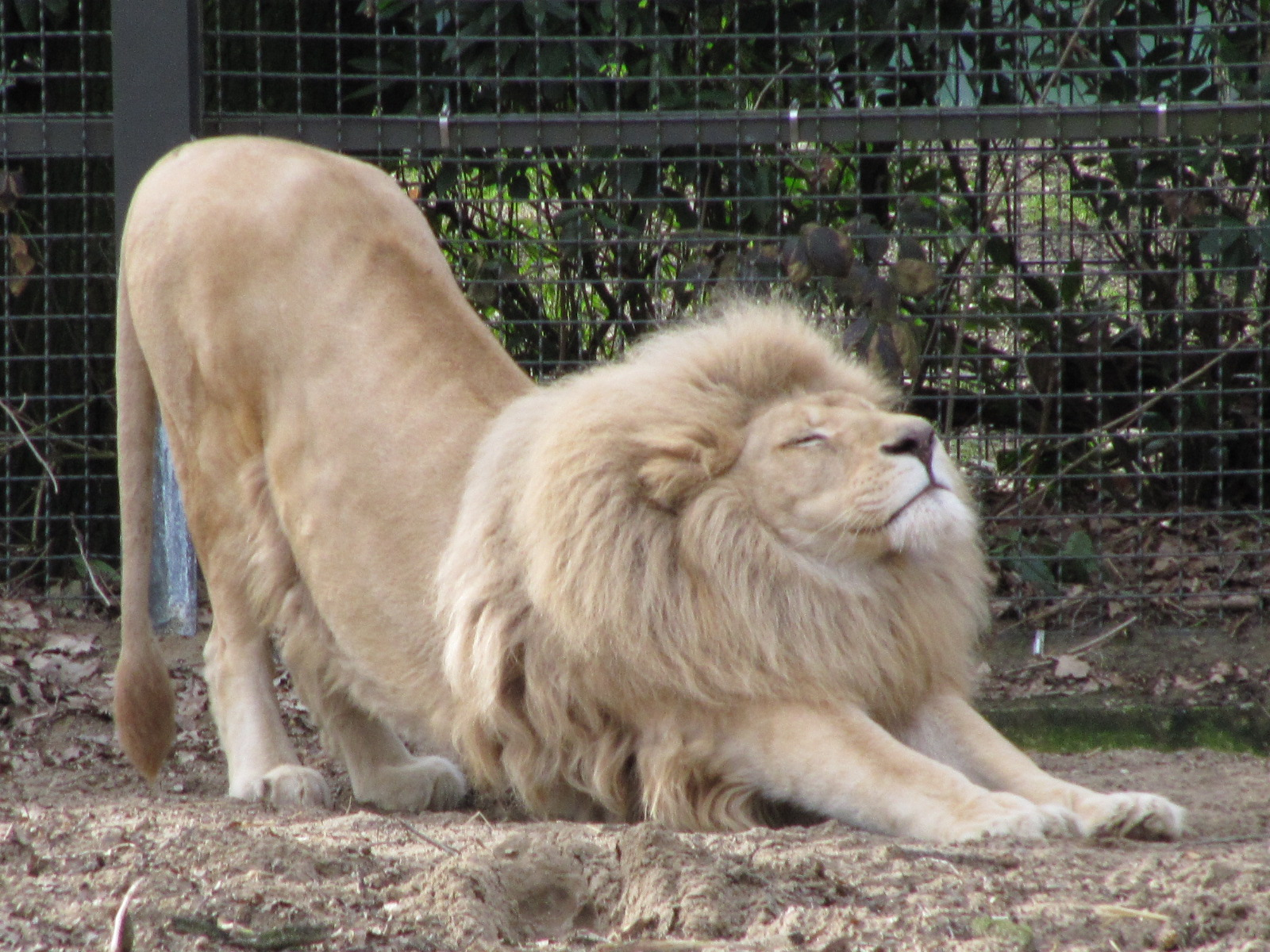
Stretching lion

The areolar tissue is permeable and is extensively distributed throughout the body. This tissue acts as a general binder for all other tissues.

=== Muscle tissue ===
Muscle tissue is made of a stretchy material. It is arranged in bundles of parallel fibres.

=== Stretch receptors ===
Stretch receptors have two parts: Spindle cells and Golgi tendons. Spindle cells, located in the center of a muscle, send messages for the muscle to contract. On the other hand, Golgi tendon receptors are located near the end of a muscle fiber and send messages for the muscle to relax. As these receptors are trained through continual use, stretching becomes easier. When reflexes that inhibit flexibility are released the splits then become easier to perform. The splits use the body's complete range of motion and provide a complete stretch.

== Stretching ==
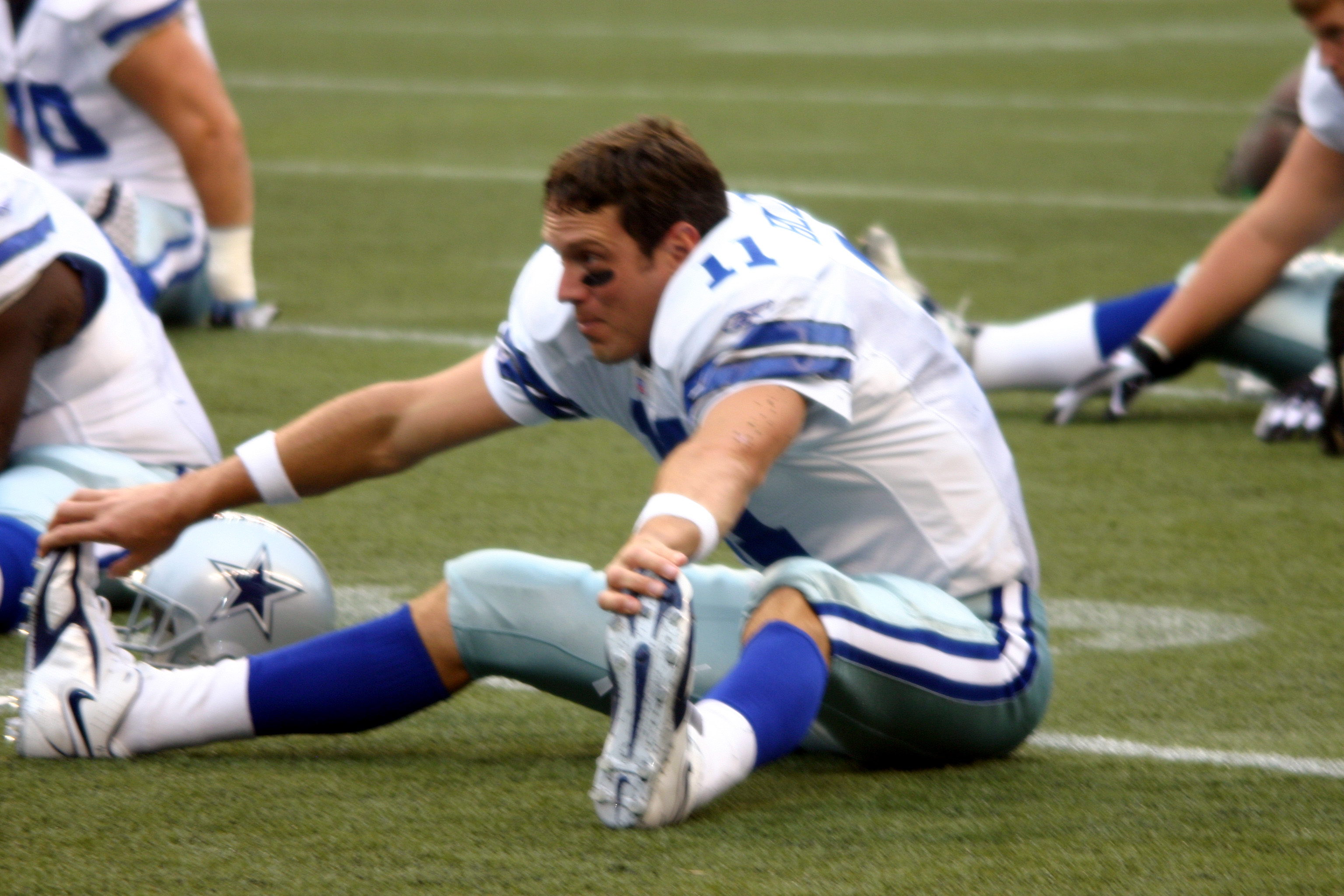
A stretching American football player

Flexibility is improved by stretching. Stretching should only be started when muscles are warm and the body temperature is raised. To be effective while stretching, force applied to the body must be held just beyond a feeling of pain and needs to be held for at least ten seconds. Increasing the range of motion creates good posture and develops proficient performance in everyday activities increasing the length of life and overall health of the individual.

=== Dynamic ===
Dynamic flexibility is classified as the ability to complete a full range of motion of a joint. This is a release of energy with proper timing for the muscles to contract. It also controls movement as the speed increases while stretching parts of the body. This form of stretching prepares the body for physical exertion and sports performance. In the past it was the practice to undertake static stretching before exercise. Dynamic stretching increases range of movement, blood and oxygen flow to soft tissues prior to exertion. Increasingly, coaches and sports trainers are aware of the role in dynamic stretching in improving performance and reducing the risk of injury.

=== Static-active ===
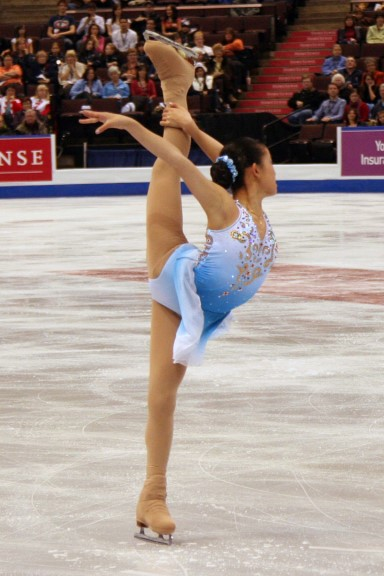
Figure skater Caroline Zhang at 2008 Skate Canada

Static-active stretching includes holding an extended position with just the strength of the muscles such as holding the leg in front, side or behind. Static-active flexibility requires a great deal of strength, making it the hardest to develop.

=== Ballistic ===
Ballistic stretching is separate from all other forms of stretching. It does not include stretching, but rather a bouncing motion. The actual performance of ballistic movements prevents lengthening of tissues. These movements should only be performed when the body is very warm; otherwise they can lead to injury.

Dance

Flexibility is one component of physical conditioning for dancers, along with muscular strength, muscular endurance, and cardiovascular endurance. Dance conditioning programs may use specialized exercises to improve strength and range of motion in ways that support dance training and performance.

Muscular strength and flexibility are both components of physical conditioning for dancers. Research has shown that dance training alone may not always provide enough stimulus to develop all aspects of physical fitness, so other types of conditioning such as adding resistance training may be use in addition to dance training. Although strength training has historically raised concerns about altering dancers physical appearance, studies have found that resistance training can improve muscular strength without necessarily changing the body composition.

== Limits ==
Each individual is born with a particular range of motion for each joint in their body. In the 1964 book Finding Balance by Gigi Berardi, the author mentions three limiting factors: occupational demands, movement demands, and training oversights.

=== Internal factors ===
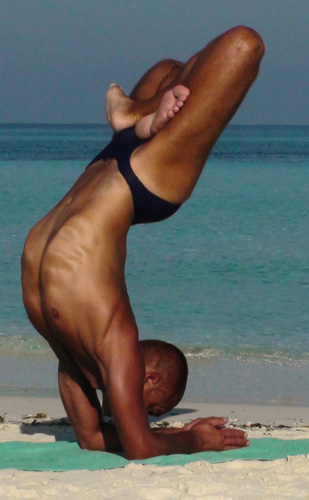
Male yoga practitioner in an inverted lotus position

Movement demands include strength, endurance and range of motion. Training oversights occurs when the body is overused. Internally, the joints, muscles, tendons, and ligaments can affect one's flexibility. As previously mentioned, each part of the body has its own limitations and combined, the range of motion can be affected. The mental attitude of the performer during the state of motion can also affect their range.

=== External factors ===
Externally, anything from the weather outside to the age of the performer can affect flexibility. General tissues and collagen change with age influencing the individual.As one ages, performing activities of daily living without pain becomes much harder. By stretching often, one can maintain a level of musculoskeletal fitness that will keep them feeling well.

Performers should be aware of over-stretching. Even basic things such as clothing and equipment can affect a performance. Dance surfaces and lack of proper shoes can also affect a performer's ability to perform at their best.

=== Signs of injury ===
Stretching for too long or too much can give way to an injury. For most activities, the normal range of motion is more than adequate. Any sudden movements or going too fast can cause a muscle to tighten. This leads to extreme pain and the performer should let the muscle relax by resting.

== Risk of injury ==
Injuries can happen in activities like yoga and aerobics. Quick, ballistic stretching can cause injury if it is done incorrectly. If a bone, muscle, or any other part is stretched more than its capacity, it may lead to dislocation or muscle pulls. Overstretching can increase chances of injury by stretching the muscle too much. Overstretching could lead to a sprain or strain, which requires rest or even physical therapy to recover from.

== See also ==
- Dance
- Exercise
- Physical fitness
