= Myofascial release =

Massage technique

Foam rolling

Myofascial release (MFR, self-myofascial release) is an alternative medicine therapy that proponents claim to be useful for treating skeletal muscle immobility and pain by relaxing contracted muscles, improving blood and lymphatic circulation, and stimulating the stretch reflex in muscles.

Fascia is a thin, tough, elastic type of connective tissue that wraps most structures within the human body, including muscle. Fascia supports and protects these structures. Osteopathic practitioners hold that this soft tissue can become restricted due to psychogenic disease, overuse, trauma, infectious agents, or inactivity, often resulting in pain, muscle tension, and corresponding diminished blood flow.

== Description and conceptual basis ==
Writing for Science-Based Medicine, Harriet Hall described myofascial release as an umbrella term for several types of physical manipulation, which might more simply be described as a kind of massage based on vaguely defined scientific notions.

== Effectiveness ==
The American Cancer Society states that "There is little scientific evidence available to support proponents' claims that myofascial release relieves pain or restores flexibility" and cautions against using it as a substitute for conventional cancer treatment. The poor quality of research into the use of myofascial release for orthopaedic conditions precludes any conclusions being drawn about its usefulness for this purpose.

In 2011, the UK Advertising Standards Authority (ASA) upheld a complaint about claims of effectiveness made in promotional material by Myofascial Release UK health care service. The ASA Council ruled that materials presented by Myofascial Release UK in support of the claims made in their ad were inadequate to establish a "body of robust scientific evidence" to substantiate Myofascial Release UK's range of claims. In addition, the ASA determined that the ad breached advertising rules by introducing a risk that readers might be discouraged from seeking other essential medical treatments.

Reviews published in 2013 and 2015 evaluating evidence for MFR's efficacy found that existing clinical trials varied widely in quality, technique, and outcome measures, yielding mixed results. The 2015 review noted: "it is time for scientific evidences on MFR to support its clinical use." Another review concluded that the use of foam rollers or a roller massager before or after exercise for self-myofascial release has been observed to decrease soreness due to DOMS and that self-myofascial release appears to have no negative effect on performance. However, the optimal timing and duration of use requires further study.

== History ==
The approach was promulgated as an alternative medicine concept by Andrew Taylor Still, inventor of osteopathy, and his early students. The exact phrase "myofascial release" was coined in the 1960s by Robert Ward, an osteopath who studied with Ida Rolf, the originator of Rolfing. Ward, along with physical therapist John Barnes, are considered the two primary founders of Myofascial Release. Ward also suggests, in other sources, that the term "myofascial release" was coined in 1981, when it was used as the name of a course taught at Michigan State University. It was popularized and taught to therapists, massage therapists and occupational therapists by John F. Barnes through his seminars.

== See also ==
- Foam rolling
- List of unproven and disproven cancer treatments
- Myofascial pain syndrome
