= Myofascial trigger point =

Hyperirritable spots in skeletal muscle

Myofascial Trigger Point
- Other names: Trigger point
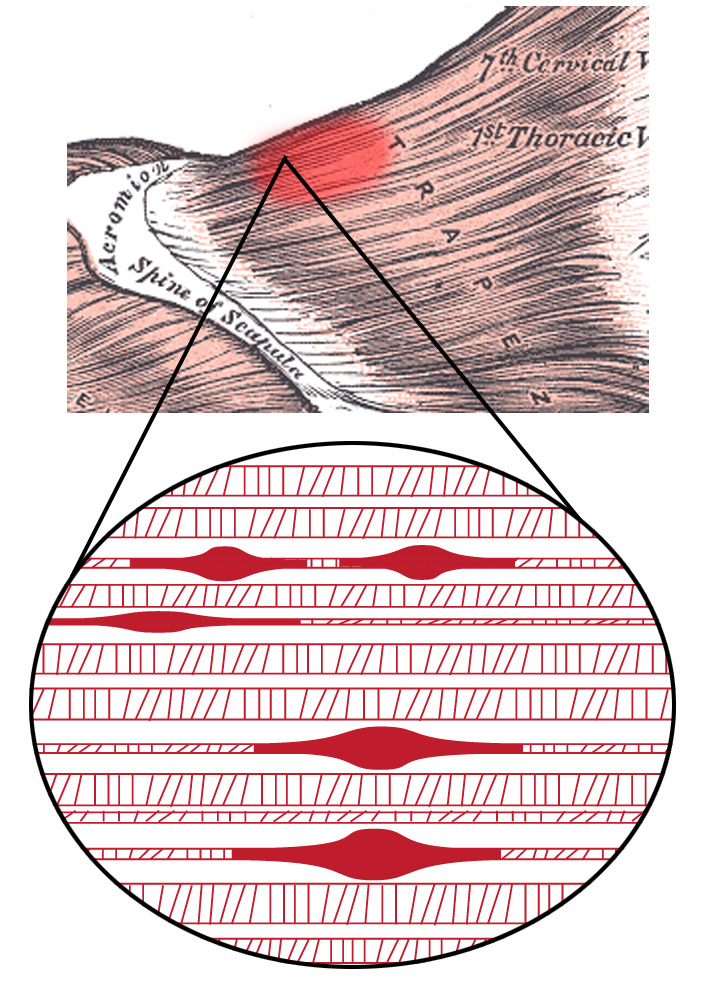
- Myofascial trigger point in the upper trapezius
- Specialty: Rheumatology

Myofascial trigger points (MTrPs), also known as trigger points, are described as hyperirritable spots in the skeletal muscle. They are associated with palpable nodules in taut bands of muscle fibers. They are a topic of ongoing controversy, as there are limited data to inform a scientific understanding of the phenomenon. Accordingly, a formal acceptance of myofascial "knots" as an identifiable source of pain is more common among bodyworkers, physical therapists, chiropractors, osteopaths, and osteopathic doctors. Nonetheless, the concept of trigger points provides a framework that may be used to help address certain musculoskeletal pain.

The trigger point model states that unexplained pain frequently radiates from these points of local tenderness to broader areas, sometimes distant from the trigger point itself. Practitioners claim to have identified reliable referred pain patterns that associate pain in one location with trigger points elsewhere. There is variation in the methodology for diagnosis of trigger points and a dearth of theory to explain how they arise and why they produce specific patterns of referred pain.

Compression of a trigger point may elicit local tenderness, referred pain, or local twitch response. The local twitch response is not the same as a muscle spasm. This is because a muscle spasm refers to the entire muscle contracting, whereas the local twitch response also involves the entire muscle but only causes a small twitch, without any contraction.

Among medical doctors, various specialists might use trigger point therapy. These include physiatrists (medical doctors specializing in physical medicine and rehabilitation), family medicine, and orthopedics. Osteopathic (as well as chiropractic) schools also include trigger points in their training. Other health professionals, such as athletic trainers, occupational therapists, physiotherapists, acupuncturists, massage therapists and structural integrators are also aware of these ideas and many of them make use of trigger points in their clinical work as well.

== Diagnosis ==
A 2009 review of nine studies examining the reliability of trigger point diagnosis found that physical examination could not be recommended as reliable for the diagnosis of trigger points.

=== Imaging ===
Since the early 2000s several research studies have been conducted to determine if there was a way to visualize myofascial trigger points using tools such as ultrasound imaging and magnetic resonance elastography. Several of these studies have been dismissed under meta-analysis. Another synthetic literature review expressed more optimism about the validity of imaging for myofascial trigger points, but admitted small sample sizes of the reviewed studies.

=== Myofascial pain syndrome ===
Myofascial pain syndrome is a focal hyperirritability in muscle that can strongly modulate central nervous system functions. Scholars distinguish this from fibromyalgia, which is characterized by widespread pain and tenderness and is described as a central augmentation of nociception giving rise to deep tissue tenderness that includes muscles. Myofascial pain is associated with muscle tenderness that arises from trigger points, focal points of tenderness, a few millimeters in diameter, found at multiple sites in a muscle and the fascia of muscle tissue. Biopsy tests found that trigger points were hyperirritable and electrically active muscle spindles in general muscle tissue.

=== Misdiagnosis of pain ===
The misdiagnosis of pain is the most important issue taken up by Travell and Simons. Referred pain from trigger points mimics the symptoms of a very long list of common maladies. Medical doctors, in weighing all the possible causes for a given condition, rarely consider a myofascial source. The study of trigger points has not historically been part of medical education. Travell and Simons hold that most of the common everyday pain is caused by myofascial trigger points and that ignorance of that basic concept could inevitably lead to false diagnoses and the ultimate failure to deal effectively with pain.

== Treatment ==
=== Physical muscle treatment ===
Physical exercise aimed at controlling posture, stretching, and proprioception has all been studied with no conclusive results. However, exercise proved beneficial to help reduce pain and the severity of symptoms that one felt. Muscular contractions that occur during exercise favor blood flow to areas that may be experiencing less than normal flow. This also causes a localized stretching effect on the fascia and may help relieve the abnormally tight fascia. Evidence that supports these exercises for treatment is scarce, but physical exercise can be beneficial in reducing the intensity of pain.

Researchers of evidence-based medicine concluded as of 2001 that evidence for the usefulness of trigger points in the diagnosis of fibromyalgia is thin. More recently, an association has been made between fibromyalgia tender points and active trigger points.

=== Trigger point injection ===
Injections without anesthetics, or dry needling, and injections including saline, local anesthetics such as procaine hydrochloride (Novocain) or articaine without vasoconstrictors like epinephrine, steroids, and botulinum toxin provide more immediate relief and can be effective when other methods fail. In regards to injections with anesthetics, a low concentration, short acting local anesthetic such as procaine 0.5% without steroids or epinephrine is recommended. High concentrations or long acting local anesthetics as well as epinephrine can cause muscle necrosis, while use of steroids can cause tissue damage.

Despite the concerns about long-acting agents, a mixture of lidocaine and bupivacaine (Marcaine) is often used. A mixture of 1 part 2% lidocaine with 3 parts 0.5% bupivacaine provides 0.5% lidocaine and 0.375% bupivacaine. This has the advantages of immediate anesthesia with lidocaine during injection to minimize injection pain while providing a longer duration of action with a lowered concentration of bupivacaine.

In 1979, a study by Czech medical doctor Karl Lewit reported that dry needling had the same success rate as anesthetic injections for the treatment of trigger points. He dubbed this the 'needle effect'.

Studies relevant to trigger points have been done since the 1930s, for example by Jonas Kellgren at University College Hospital, London, Michael Gutstein in Berlin, and Michael Kelly in Australia.

Health insurance companies in the US such as Blue Cross Blue Shield Association, Medica, and HealthPartners began covering trigger point injections in 2005.

=== Risks ===
Treatment, whether by self or by a professional, has some inherent dangers. It may lead to damage to soft tissue and other organs. The trigger points in the upper quadratus lumborum, for instance, are very close to the kidneys, and poorly administered treatment (particularly injections) may lead to kidney damage. Likewise, treating the masseter muscle may damage the salivary glands superficial to this muscle. Furthermore, some experts believe trigger points may develop as a protective measure against unstable joints.

=== Efficacy ===
Studies have shown a moderate level of evidence for manual therapy for short-term relief in the treatment of myofascial trigger points. Dry needling and dry cupping are no more effective than a placebo. There have not been enough in-depth studies to be conclusive about the latter treatment modalities, however.

Studies to date on the efficacy of dry needling for MTrPs and pain have been too small to be conclusive.

== Overlap with acupuncture ==
In a June 2000 review, Chang-Zern Hong correlates the MTrP "tender points" to acupunctural "ah shi" ("Oh Yes!") points, and the "local twitch response" to acupuncture's "de qi" ("needle sensation"), based on a 1977 paper by Melzack et al. Peter Dorsher comments on a strong correlation between the locations of trigger points and classical acupuncture points, finding that 92% of the 255 trigger points correspond to acupuncture points, including 79.5% with similar pain indications.

== History ==
In the 19th century, British medical doctor George William Balfour, German anatomist Robert Froriep, and the German medical doctor Strauss described pressure-sensitive, painful knots in muscles, sometimes called myofascial trigger points, through retrospective diagnosis.

The concept was popularized in the US in the middle of the 20th century by the American medical doctor Janet G. Travell.

== Controversy ==
A review from 2015 in the journal Rheumatology, official journal of the British Society for Rheumatology, concluded that the concept of myofascial pain caused by trigger points was nothing but an invention without any scientific basis. A rejection of this criticism appeared in the Journal of Bodywork & Movement Therapies, the official journal of several therapeutic societies, including The National Association of Myofascial Trigger Point Therapists USA.

== Research ==
An analysis of the environment of trigger points found the pH around active trigger points going down to pH 4.3. Furthermore, the environment of trigger points (unlike healthy muscle) contained inflammatory cytokines and CGRP. Concentrations of protons (H^{+}), bradykinin, calcitonin gene-related peptide, substance P, tumor necrosis factor-β, interleukin 1-β, serotonin, and norepinephrine were found to be significantly higher in the active trigger point group than either of the other two groups (latent trigger points and no trigger points).

== See also ==
- Acupressure
- Myofascial release
- Neuromuscular therapy
- Pressure point
