= Yorkshire Ambulance Service =

Ambulance trust in Yorkshire, England

Yorkshire Ambulance Service NHS Trust

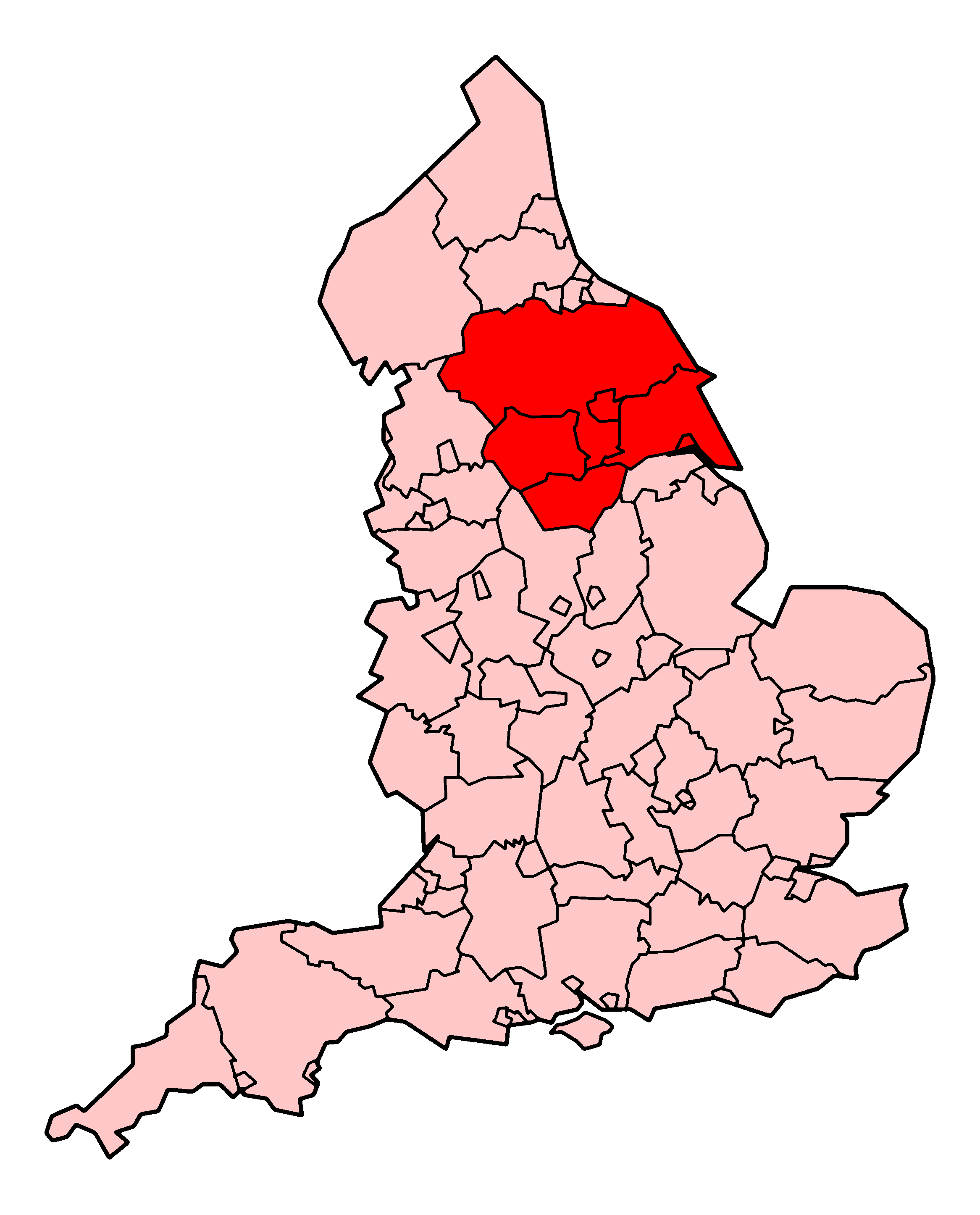
- Area served by Yorkshire Ambulance Service NHS Trust
- Type: NHS trust
- Established: 1 July 2006
- Headquarters: Wakefield, West Yorkshire, England
- Region served: East Riding of Yorkshire; North Yorkshire (part); South Yorkshire; West Yorkshire
- Area size: 6,000 sq miles
- Population: 5 million
- Chair: Martin Havenhand
- Chief executive: Peter Reading
- Website: www.yas.nhs.uk

Yorkshire Ambulance Service NHS Trust (YAS) is the NHS ambulance service covering most of Yorkshire in England. It is one of ten NHS Ambulance Trusts providing England with emergency medical services. As part of the National Health Service it receives direct government funding for its role.

It was formed on 1 July 2006 following the mergers of the former West Yorkshire Metropolitan Ambulance Service ("WYMAS"), South Yorkshire Ambulance Service ("SYAS") and some services from the Tees, East and North Yorkshire Ambulance Service ("TENYAS").

== History ==
Yorkshire Ambulance Service was formed on 1 July 2006, around the same time as many of the ambulance services in England merged with neighbouring services to become closer in line with the government regions, in this case excluding parts of Lincolnshire in the Yorkshire and the Humber region. This followed the 2005 publication of the Taking Healthcare to the Patient: Transforming NHS Ambulance Services report by Peter Bradley.

=== West Yorkshire Metropolitan ===
WYMAS was formed in 1974, covering the then new metropolitan county of West Yorkshire and the Craven district of North Yorkshire. It brought together some of the individual city ambulance services which existed across the area and in 1992, it became an NHS trust, providing 24-hour emergency and healthcare services to more than 2.1 million people across the region. WYMAS had 21 ambulance stations within its operating area.

=== Tees, East and North Yorkshire ===
TENYAS was formed on 1 April 1999, as a merger of the former Cleveland, North Yorkshire ambulance services and the northern part of Humberside Ambulance Services which covered the East Riding of Yorkshire. It served the urban areas of Middlesbrough, York and Hull along with the rural areas of the Yorkshire Dales and Yorkshire Wolds.

=== South Yorkshire ===
SYAS was formed in 1974 as the South Yorkshire Metropolitan Ambulance Service covering the then new metropolitan county of South Yorkshire. On 1 April 1992, it became an NHS trust and served over 1.4 million people in an area of over 600 square miles (1,600 km^{2}).

== Services ==
YAS serves a population of five million people and employs over 7,200 staff and supported by over 1,300 volunteers. On an average year, YAS will respond to 700,000 emergency calls and conduct one million patient transport journeys.

YAS's main roles are to:

- receive 999 calls in two Emergency Operations Centres (EOC), based in Wakefield and York, and deploy the most appropriate response to meet patients' needs
- respond to 999 calls by getting medical help to patients who have serious or life-threatening injuries or illnesses as quickly as possible
- provide the NHS 111 urgent medical help and advice line in Yorkshire and the Humber as well as Bassetlaw in Nottinghamshire
- take eligible patients to and from their hospital appointments with our non-emergency patient transport service

=== Emergency response ===
In 2013–14, YAS staff received 795,750 emergency and urgent calls, an average of over 2,180 calls a day. YAS responded to a total of 708,883 incidents by either a vehicle arriving on scene or by telephone advice. Of these, 267,716 were categorised as immediately life-threatening. This increased in 2024-25 where they responded to an average of over 3,381 per day. YAS responded to a total of 908,378 incidents by either a vehicle arriving on scene or by telephone advice.

Like other English ambulance trusts, YAS has experienced year-on-year growth in activity since it was established in 2006; overall response activity was up by 2% from 2012–13 to 2013–14.

YAS delivered the national emergency response target (75% of immediately life-threatening calls were reached in eight minutes and 95% of these calls within 19 minutes) for the third consecutive year in 2013–14. This was only achieved by YAS downgrading a large number of calls to a less serious category, they are due to be investigated by the CQC for this.

=== NHS 111 ===
YAS runs the NHS 111 service in Yorkshire and the Humber, Bassetlaw, North Lincolnshire and North East Lincolnshire. The service took its one millionth call in February 2014 and is one of the highest performing NHS 111 services in England. Up to the end of 2013–14, the service responded to 1,100,599 calls, 94.9% of which were answered within 60 seconds (the national target is 95%).

=== Patient transport service ===
YAS patient transport service (PTS) is the largest ambulance provider of non-emergency transport in Yorkshire and the Humber. In 2013–14, YAS PTS undertook 886,312 non-emergency journeys.

Transport is provided for people who are unable to use public or other transport due to their medical condition. This includes those:

- attending hospital outpatient clinics and community-based care
- being admitted to or discharged from hospital
- needing life-saving treatment such as chemotherapy or renal dialysis

=== University First Responders ===
Students from the Hull York Medical School (HYMS) and community first responders (CFR) from across Yorkshire received training from YAS at Hull Royal Infirmary. In 2012, there were 63 medical students who trained as CFR in Hull and York.

A university scheme was also rolled out in Leeds by December 2016. LSCFR is affiliated with the University of Leeds. This scheme has around 60 volunteer responders from across the University, working to provide assistance in Leeds. Their work is concentrated in the Hyde Park, Kirkstall, Chapeltown and Headingley areas.

=== YAS Community and Commercial Training ===
The YAS Community and Commercial Training Department has provided first aid and other training services to the NHS, local community and many other organisations for over 15 years. Income generated from these commercial activities is used directly to help fund YAS community initiatives in Yorkshire and the Humber.

== Geography ==
YAS covers the counties of West Yorkshire, South Yorkshire, the East Riding of Yorkshire, and North Yorkshire (not including the boroughs of Middlesbrough, Redcar and Cleveland or Stockton-on-Tees, which are covered by the North East Ambulance Service).

The headquarters of YAS is located within the Wakefield 41 Business Park to the north of Wakefield city centre and near to junction 41 of the M1 motorway, with a satellite Administration and Control Centre based in Skelton, York; this building was the former headquarters for Tees, East and North Yorkshire Ambulance Service NHS Trust. Prior to 2019, YAS had another Administration and Control Centre based in Moorgate, Rotherham which was the former headquarters for South Yorkshire Metropolitan Ambulance Service NHS Trust, having closed the control room there in 2008.

Accident and Emergency operations are divided into the following Clinical Business Units ("CBUs") almost conterminous with the geographic boundaries:

- North Yorkshire
- Hull & East Riding of Yorkshire
- Leeds & Wakefield (LW)
- Bradford, Calderdale, and Kirklees (BCK)
- South Yorkshire

== Organisation ==
=== Leadership ===
The current interim chief executive is Peter Reading, who commenced his role in June 2023, having left Northern Lincolnshire and Goole Hospitals NHS Foundation Trust. Prior to this, the chief executive was Rod Barnes, who was made substantive in his role in May 2015 and prior to this, was the interim chief executive and executive director of finance and performance. He replaced David Whiting, who was chief executive between February 2011 and November 2014. His background is generally finance-based and he has worked in a number of other NHS provider organisations including Taunton and Somerset NHS Foundation Trust and Great Western Ambulance Service. He began his NHS career at Airedale and Harrogate district hospitals and has held a wide variety of leadership positions.

Other former chief executives were Jayne Barnes (no relation) serving 1 July 2006 – 14 January 2008, and Martyn Pritchard serving 15 January 2008 – June 2010. Barnes emigrated to Australia to take up the post of assistant commissioner of Queensland Ambulance Service (South East region) and Pritchard left to take up a role at the Strategic Health Authority.

David Forster, the policy and strategy director, resigned his position in 2010 after stating that the NHS employed "too many who are lazy, unproductive, obstinate, militant, aggressive at every turn" he also claimed some employees "couldn't secure a job anywhere outside the bloated public sector where mediocrity is too often shielded by weak and unprincipled HR policies".

On 8 March 2016, the trust announced that incumbent chairwoman Della Cannings was standing down from her position after six years, with her final date in office being 9 May 2016.

=== Staff roles ===
YAS employs 7,200 staff, who together with 1,300 volunteers, provide a vital 24-hour emergency and healthcare service. The largest proportion of staff, over 62%, are employed in operational patient-facing roles including Accident and Emergency, Patient Transport Service, NHS 111, Hazardous Area Response Team, Yorkshire Air Ambulance paramedics, Emergency Operations Centre, Resilience and Special Services, Private and Events, Resource and Embrace paediatric and neonatal transport service.

=== Fleet ===
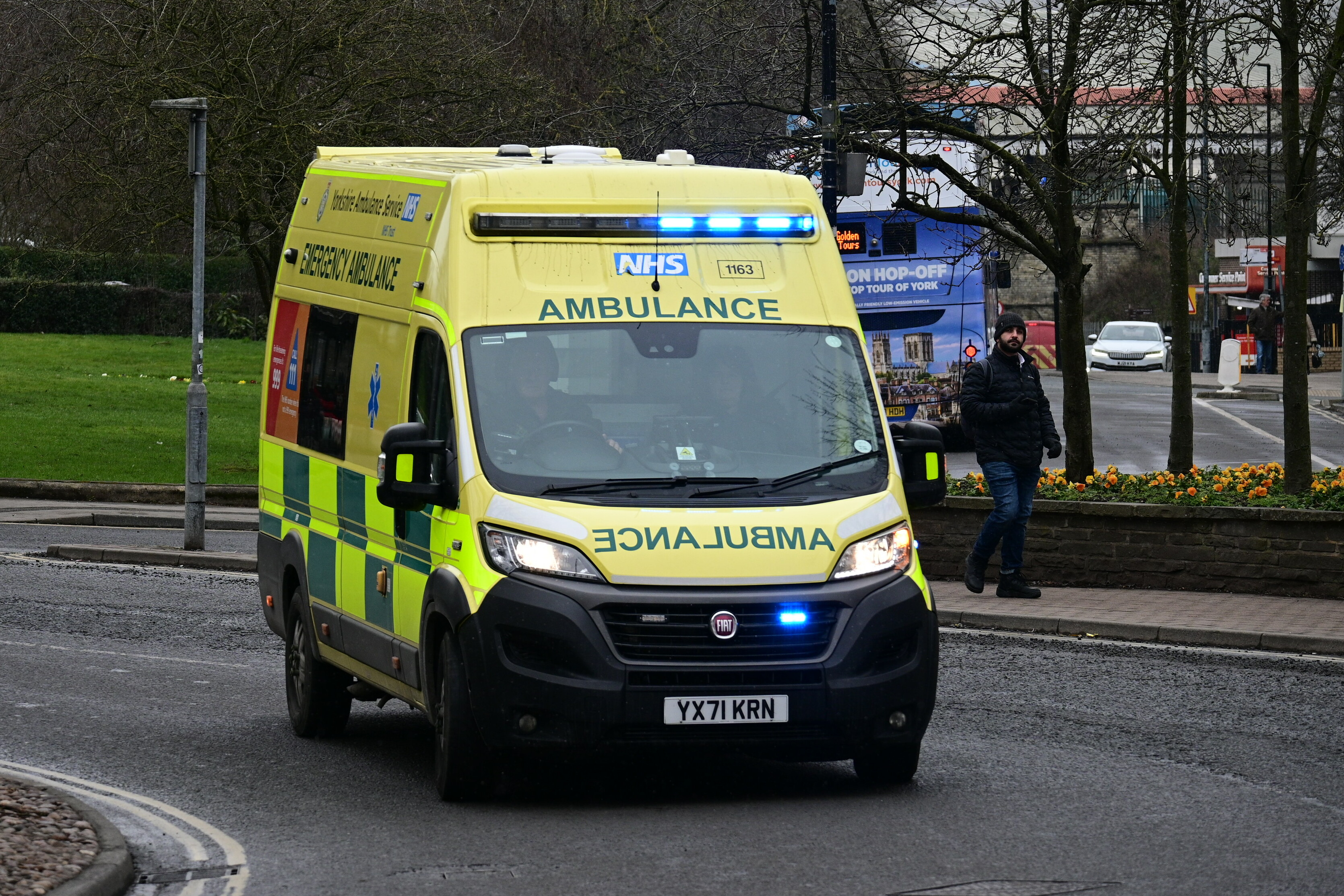
A Fiat Ducato ambulance in York

YAS operates over 500 emergency vehicles which are a mix of Double Crewed Ambulances (DCAs, usually crewed with a qualified Paramedic or Emergency Medical Technician (EMT) working with an Emergency Care Assistant) and Rapid Response Vehicles (RRVs) which are crewed by a single paramedic, EMT or Emergency Care Practitioner. The emergency fleet is primarily made up of Fiat Ducato ambulances and Škoda Kodiaq rapid response vehicles.

YAS also has over 370 Patient Transport Service (PTS) vehicles which are operated by over 800 patient transport staff.

YAS can deploy rescue helicopters, including two Airbus H145 aircraft of the Yorkshire Air Ambulance to emergencies and incidents across the service area, however the Air Ambulance Service is a charity and not an integral part of YAS – paramedics are provided by YAS and work on a rota with doctors who are voluntary members of the BASICS (British Association for Immediate Care) to offer additional medical skills.

YAS has the ability to call on private companies and St John Ambulance to provide cover in times of extreme need, and a long-term contract is held with St John Ambulance to provide fully crewed ambulances to YAS for emergency and non-emergency work.

=== Yorkshire Ambulance Service Charitable Fund ===
YAS has its own Charitable Fund which receives donations and legacies from grateful patients, members of the public and fundraising initiatives throughout Yorkshire.

The Charitable Fund exists to support the work of the trust. Key uses of funds include the provision of additional training and equipment for services over and above the level that would normally be delivered as part of core NHS funding.

During 2013–14 and continuing into 2014, the Charitable Fund has been focusing its efforts on raising money for community medical units, which provide on-scene medical treatment for patients with minor injuries and illnesses, and public access defibrillators.

== CQC performance rating ==
In its last inspection of the service in June 2019, the Care Quality Commission (CQC) gave the following ratings on a scale of outstanding (the service is performing exceptionally well), good (the service is performing well and meeting our expectations), requires improvement (the service isn't performing as well as it should) and inadequate (the service is performing badly):

Inspection Reports
Area	Rating 2015	Rating 2017	Rating 2019
Are services Safe?	Requires improvement	Good	Good
Are services Effective?	Requires improvement	Good	Good
Are services Caring	Good	Good	Good
Are services Responsive	Requires improvement	Good	Good
Are services Well-led	Requires improvement	Good	Good
Overall rating	Requires improvement	Good	Good
