= Hull York Medical School =

Medical school in Kingston upon Hull, England

- Type: Medical school
- Established: 2003
- Affiliations: University of Hull; University of York; National Health Service
- Dean: Professor Matt Morgan
- Location: Kingston upon Hull; 53.7715°N 0.3719°W; York; 53.9500°N 1.0507°W, England
- Qualification gained: MBBS with optional intercalated BSc or MSc
- Website: www.hyms.ac.uk

Hull York Medical School (HYMS) is a medical school in England which took its first intake of students in 2003. It was opened as a part of the British government's attempts to train more doctors, along with Brighton and Sussex Medical School, Peninsula Medical School and University of East Anglia Medical School. It is the joint medical school of the Universities Hull and York. The medical school was ranked 3rd in the UK for Medicine by The Guardian University Guide 2026 and 10th by The Times University Guide 2026. The medical school scored well and above the sector benchmark across all 9 areas of the 2025 National Student Survey (NSS), particularly on Teaching on my Course, Learning Opportunities, Assessment and Feedback, and Mental Wellbeing Support. The University of Hull was rated Gold, the highest possible ranking, in the Teaching Excellence Framework 2023 as was the University of York. The University of York is also a member of the Russell Group; an association of 24 world class, research intensive universities.

== History ==
The early history of medical education in Hull and York goes back to the four following institutions: Hull Medical School (1831), Hull Medical Society (1847–1856, 1889 – present), York Medical Society (1832) and the York Medical School (1834). Notable doctors associated with the York school included John Hughlings Jackson (in whose honour the modern medical school building at the University of York is named), Daniel Hack Tuke, Thomas Laycock (physiologist), James Atkinson (surgeon), and Sir Jonathan Hutchinson. The York school closed in 1862, whilst the Hull school closed in 1869.

The founding of a medical school as part of the University of Hull was considered in the Report of the Royal Commission on Medical Education 1965–68 (Todd Report) (published 1968), but the idea was not thought viable until the Humber Bridge was completed, as it would enable students to travel to placements in South Lincolnshire.

The region which the Hull York Medical School now serves, used to be the largest population centre in England without a medical school. Therefore, a bid was submitted by the universities of Hull and York, and the NHS in the year 2000 to establish a medical school in this region. The University of Hull at that time had the largest free-standing postgraduate medical school in England whilst the University of York had the largest group of health policy researchers in the world and a strong reputation in science; with particular specialisms in cancer research, neuroscience and tissue repair. This is evidenced by the number of prominent alumni in science and healthcare of both universities such as George William Gray CBE FRS (chemist), Christian Langton (medical physicist), Barry John Everitt FRS FMedSci (neuroscientist, emeritus professor of Behavioural Neuroscience and Director of Research at the University of Cambridge), Dame Sarah Catherine Gilbert DBE FRS (vaccinologist and professor of Vaccinology at the University of Oxford), Tanya Byron (psychologist and media personality), Jane Clarke (biophysical chemist and retired professor at the University of Cambridge), Professor Dame Caroline Dean DBE FRS (scientist), Nelson Teich (oncologist and former Minister of Health for Brazil) and Christopher Dye FRS FMedSci (biologist, ecologist and former Director of Strategy at the World Health Organization) to name but a few.

== Entry ==
The medical school has 220 places for home students and 11 for international students for 2025 entry. The number of applications it receives varies each year. For 2022 entry, the medical school received 2047 applications for Medicine and 354 applications for Medicine with a Gateway Year. As of 2019, applicants are required to sit the UCAT admissions test. Successful applicants are allocated a home campus of either the University of Hull or the University of York, where they will be based for the first two years of their studies. Campuses are allocated to students via a random allocation process, however requests for a specific campus may be considered if the student fulfils certain criteria.

== Teaching and Course structure ==
The programme at Hull York Medical School is a 5-year MB BS course, split into three phases. In Phase I (Years 1 and 2), problem based learning (PBL) is at the core of the curriculum, where learning is undertaken via clinical placements, anatomy sessions, clinical and communication skills sessions, lectures, workshops and self-directed learning. Students are also expected to undertake research-related study as part of the Scholarship and Special Interest Programme.

In Phase II (Years 3 and 4), students experience full-time clinical placements in GP surgeries and community settings (primary care) and hospitals (secondary care), where they rotate through different specialisms and locations. Placement sites are in Hull, York, Grimsby, Northallerton, Middlesbrough, Scarborough and Scunthorpe. Students continue to attend seminars, teaching sessions and clinical skills practicals at the dedicated teaching facilities at each site.

In Phase III (Year 5), students continue with clinical placement rotations throughout the region, in primary and secondary care settings. However the emphasis is now on preparing students for the next stage of their medical training and supporting their transition to becoming resident doctors. In this phase, a greater emphasis is placed on being a member of a multidisciplinary medical team, and gaining experience of on-call and out-of-hours duties. Again, students will continue to attend seminars, teaching sessions and clinical skills practicals at the dedicated teaching facilities at each site. During this phase, students will also carry out a six-week elective which can be done abroad or in the UK. The elective provides students with the opportunity to explore medicine beyond the MB BS course.

Students on the 6 year Medicine with a Gateway Year course, have to successfully complete the first year (i.e. the Gateway Year), before they can progress to the 5 year MB BS course.

The medical school offers intercalation (one extra year on top of the medical degree, during which students can study another undergraduate or postgraduate degree) and encourages students to consider this option. The medical school offers a variety of degrees in specialist subjects such as clinical anatomy, immunology and infection, neuroscience, pharmacology and drug development, public health, and health professions education. Students can also choose to study at another institution in the UK or even internationally.

The teaching of anatomy at the medical school is done via a combination of prosections, medical imaging, computer-based anatomy programmes, cadaveric videos, anatomical models and innovative techniques in living anatomy developed by the medical school's own researchers. Dissection can be done as part of the Scholarship and Special Interest Programme, during the elective period in Year 5 or as part of the medical school's intercalated Masters programmes; MSc in Clinical Anatomy or MSc in Clinical Anatomy and Education.

UK medical students graduating in the academic year 2024–25 onwards will need to pass the General Medical Council's Medical Licensing Assessment (MLA) before they can join the medical register. The MLA will be led and delivered in the final exams by UK medical schools and regulated by the General Medical Council.

== Facilities ==
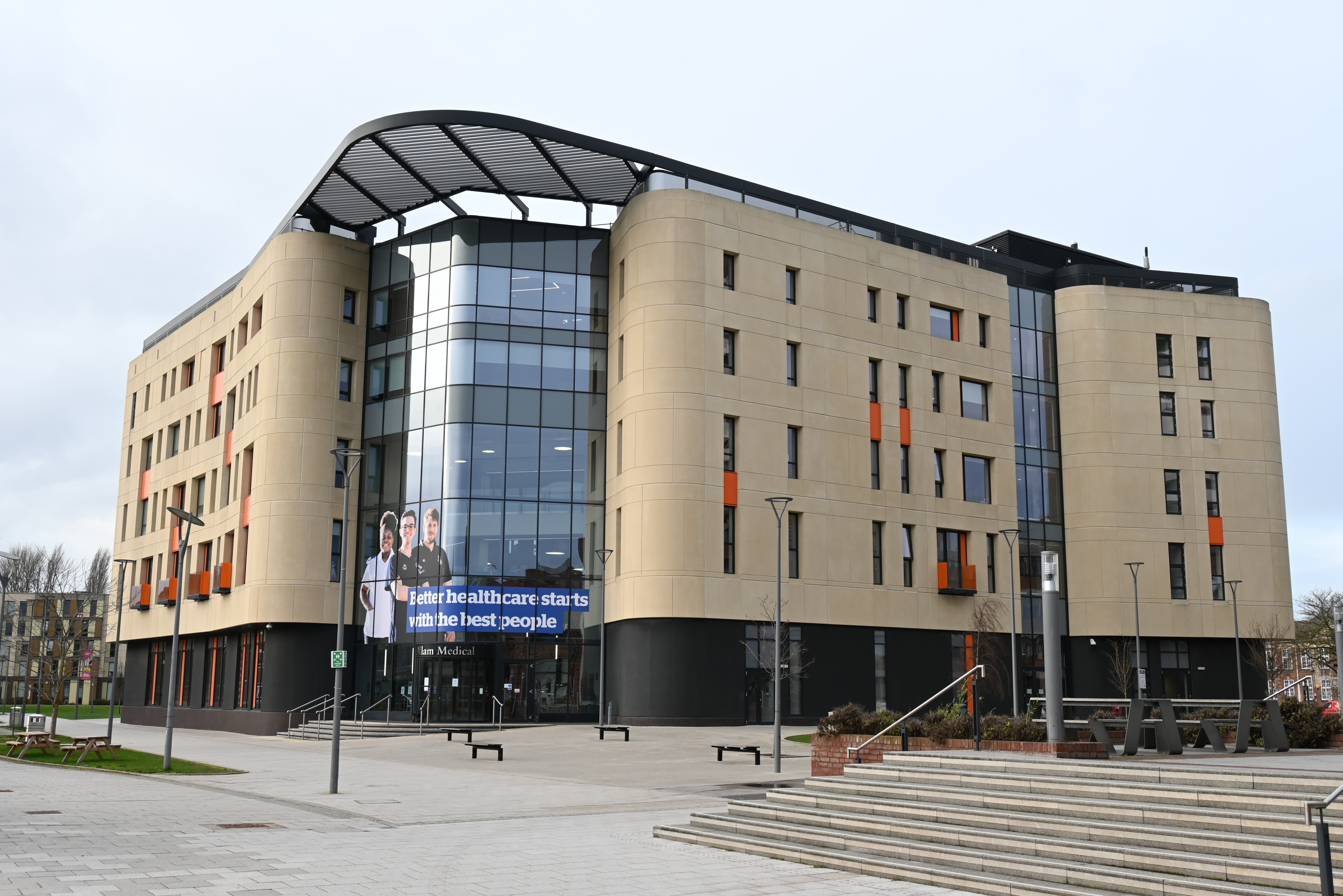
Allam Medical Building, Hull York Medical School, University of Hull campus

The Allam Medical Building (University of Hull campus), is home to the Faculty of Health Sciences, which includes the medical school, the School of Psychology and Social Work, the School of Sport, Health and Rehabilitation Sciences and the School of Health Care. It was opened by Her Majesty Queen Elizabeth II in 2017 and also won in the Buildings That Inspire category in The Guardian's University Awards 2018. The Hull York Medical School Building (University of York campus), has undergone refurbishment in recent years where facilities include a new problem based learning suite, a collaborative learning space, and provision of new clinical skills spaces nearby in the Seebohm Rowntree Building. The Health Professions Education Unit and National STEM Learning Centre are also in close proximity.

== Campuses, NHS Trusts and Hospitals ==
Hull York Medical School is based at two university sites, the University of Hull and University of York, and is partnered with three Acute NHS Trusts, three Mental Health Trusts, GP surgeries across the region, NAViGO Health and Social Care CIC and City Health Care Partnership CIC.

Acute Trusts and Hospitals

Hull University Teaching Hospitals NHS Trust:

- Hull Royal Infirmary
- Castle Hill Hospital (the site of the award-winning Queen's Centre for Oncology and Haematology, and the state of the art Centre for Cardiology and Cardiothoracic Surgery)

Northern Lincolnshire and Goole Hospitals NHS Foundation Trust:

- Diana, Princess of Wales Hospital (the site of one of the most advanced emergency care centres in the region, modern en-suite facilities and a £4.4 million oncology, haematology and rheumatology unit)
- Scunthorpe General Hospital

York and Scarborough Teaching Hospitals NHS Foundation Trust:

- York Hospital
- Scarborough General Hospital

Mental Health Trusts

Rotherham Doncaster and South Humber NHS Foundation Trust

Humber Teaching NHS Foundation Trust (was named Mental Health Provider of the Year at the prestigious Health Service Journal (HSJ) Awards 2019

Tees, Esk and Wear Valleys NHS Foundation Trust

- Friarage Hospital
- James Cook Hospital

== List of deans ==
- William Gillespie OBE (2003–2007)
- Ian Greer (2007–2010)
- Tony Kendrick (2010–2013)
- Trevor Sheldon (November 2013 – December 2016)
- Una Macleod (January 2017 – December 2023)
- Professor Matt Morgan (January 2024 – Present)

== Staff ==
John Lee, professor of Clinical Pathology was a co-presenter on Anatomy for Beginners (screened in the UK on Channel 4 in 2005) in which he explained the dissections of Gunther von Hagens. He co-presented a second series with von Hagens in 2006 called Autopsy: Life and Death (Channel 4, 2006). He left the medical school in 2014.

== Notable alumni ==
- Ola Brown (founder of Flying Doctors Healthcare Investment Company)
- Uche Odouza (orthopaedic surgeon and retired Rugby Union player)
