= Tees, East and North Yorkshire Ambulance Service =

- TENYAS
- NHS corporate identity logo for TENYAS
- Type: Defunct NHS Ambulance Service
- Established: 1 April 1999
- Disbanded: 1 July 2006
- Headquarters: Skelton, York, England
- Region served: Counties of North Yorkshire, East Riding of Yorkshire and Teesside
- Area size: 4,500 square miles

Tees, East and North Yorkshire Ambulance Service (TENYAS) was the NHS ambulance service covering the urban areas of Middlesbrough, Stockton-on-Tees, York and Hull along with the rural areas of the Yorkshire Dales and Yorkshire Wolds. In total the organisation provided ambulance cover for an area of the size of approximately 4,500 square miles (12,000 km^{2}).

The service was formed on 1 April 1999, as a merger of the former Cleveland, North Yorkshire and the northern half of Humberside Ambulance Services and had 37 ambulance stations within its operating area with the southern half of Humberside Ambulance Service being absorbed by Lincolnshire Ambulance Service. Resources were deployed from the two control rooms situated in Middlesbrough and at ambulance headquarters in Skelton, York known as 'Fairfields'. This building was a purpose-built ambulance headquarters, commissioned by the previous incumbent service, North Yorkshire Ambulance Service.

== Demise ==
Following the 2005 publication of the Taking Healthcare to the Patient: Transforming NHS Ambulance Services report by Peter Bradley, the East and North Yorkshire areas merged with West Yorkshire Metropolitan Ambulance Service and South Yorkshire Ambulance Service to form Yorkshire Ambulance Service on 1 July 2006, with the Teesside area being absorbed by North East Ambulance Service. The TENYAS headquarters was retained by Yorkshire Ambulance Service as is now known as Administration and Control Centre – North and is still in use today.
