= Clockwise (film) =

1986 film by Christopher Morahan

- theatrical release poster by Tom Jung
- Directed by: Christopher Morahan
- Written by: Michael Frayn
- Produced by: Michael Codron
- Starring: John Cleese; Penelope Wilton; Alison Steadman; Stephen Moore; Sharon Maiden
- Cinematography: John Coquillon
- Edited by: Peter Boyle
- Music by: George Fenton
- Production company: Moment Films
- Distributed by: Thorn EMI Screen Entertainment
- Release date: 14 March 1986
- Running time: 96 minutes
- Country: United Kingdom
- Language: English
- Budget: £4 million
- Box office: £4,823,000

Clockwise is a 1986 British comedy road film starring John Cleese, directed by Christopher Morahan, written by Michael Frayn and produced by Michael Codron. The film's music was composed by George Fenton.

For his performance Cleese won the 1987 Peter Sellers Award For Comedy at the Evening Standard British Film Awards. Most urban scenes were shot in the West Midlands, Yorkshire and Lincolnshire, while rural scenes were largely shot in Shropshire. Menzies High School in West Bromwich was used to portray the fictional school within the film.

It was the last film credit for executive Nat Cohen and has been called "a classy final credit".

== Plot ==
Brian Stimpson, headmaster of Thomas Tompion Comprehensive School, has been elected to chair the annual Headmasters' Conference meeting in Norwich. Openly careless as a young man, Stimpson is now compulsively organised and punctual and his school runs "like clockwork". Stimpson is the first headmaster of a comprehensive school to chair the Headmasters' Conference, an honour usually reserved for heads of more prestigious private schools. He talks about this at a school assembly, finishing with everyone singing the hymn "To Be a Pilgrim", accompanied by music teacher Mr Jolly.

Despite constant rehearsal of his speech and preparations for the journey to the conference, Stimpson's ordered world unwinds as a series of unfortunate circumstances delay him en route. He mistakenly boards the wrong train, missing his connection for Norwich, owing to a lingering habit of saying "right" as emphasis in situations where it would be mistaken for a direction; then, in his desperation to board the departing correct train, he leaves the text of his speech behind on the wrong one, and is finally left at the railway station by his wife, who thinks he departed on the train.

Determined to get to Norwich on time, Stimpson searches for his wife at home and then at the hospital where she volunteers looking after dementia patients, but narrowly misses her. Attempting to hail a taxi, Stimpson stumbles across Laura Wisely, one of his sixth form students, who is driving and playing truant during a study break; he commandeers her and her car in a bid to drive to Norwich.

Stimpson's wife sees the two at a petrol station, assuming that her husband is having an extramarital affair with the student and taking her down to attend the conference. Mrs Stimpson, who is still looking after three senile old women, drives after Stimpson and both parties forget to pay for their petrol. The police are called and, responding to a call from Laura's parents reporting the car as stolen and their daughter as missing, attempt to find Stimpson and arrest him for kidnapping. Stimpson's wife, Laura's parents, the police and Mr Jolly, who has secretly been dating Laura, all pursue Stimpson and Laura to the conference.

Taking a break, Stimpson and Laura try to call the conference from a telephone box. A local mistakes them for vandals after Stimpson vents his frustrations at the malfunctioning phones, and calls the police. The local sends her daughter Pat to Stimpson, but she turns out to be a childhood friend and former girlfriend of Stimpson. Stimpson coerces her into driving them to the conference.

After a series of wrong turns, the group desperately turn into a farmer's field in order to escape cows and a lorry, and get stuck in deep mud. Brian leaves the stuck car to seek help, and ends up at a monastery where he is persuaded to take a bath and collect himself. While he is gone, a local farmer tows the car out of the mud; Pat finally drives away in the car but is soon arrested for assaulting a police officer. All the while, Stimpson's wife and the others arrive at the conference uninvited, much to the horror of the headmasters; they attempt to sequester the growing group of concerned parents, wives, senile ladies and police officers as the conference continues.

Stranded without transport, Laura and Stimpson (who is dressed in monks' robes, leaving his muddy suit with the monks) attempt to hitchhike. They are picked up by a wealthy car salesman, whom they persuade to come for a walk in the woods. They trick the traveller into swapping clothes with Stimpson under the guise of foreplay, but Stimpson and Laura run away and steal his car.

Stimpson finally arrives at the conference in the torn suit of the car salesman and delivers an improvised recount of his lost speech, which becomes increasingly mocking and oppressive in tone to the disappointed headmasters. During his speech various characters, including the old women, Mr Jolly and Laura's parents walk into the hall, and Stimpson addresses them like he would late pupils, ordering and humiliating the entire collected group with the same authoritarian demeanour with which he runs his own school. Finally, he directs all of the headmasters to stand and sing "To Be A Pilgrim", in an identical manner to the school assembly at the start of the film, as he walks out of the building to face the police. The headmasters watch on as Stimpson and the rest of the party are all led away by police, with Stimpson still giving headmasterly orders to all the officers in the car.

== Cast ==
- John Cleese as Brian Stimpson
- Penelope Wilton as Pat
- Alison Steadman as Gwenda Stimpson
- Stephen Moore as Mr Jolly
- Sharon Maiden as Laura Wisely
- Benjamin Whitrow as Headmaster
- Geoffrey Palmer as Headmaster
- Peter Cellier as Headmaster
- Nicholas Le Prevost as Headmaster
- Joan Hickson as Mrs Trellis
- Geoffrey Hutchings as Mr Wisely
- Pat Keen as Mrs Wisely
- Constance Chapman as Mrs Wheel
- Ann Way as Mrs Way
- Tony Haygarth as Ivan with the tractor
- John Bardon as ticket collector
- Michael Aldridge as Prior
- Sheila Keith as Pat's mother
- Mark Burdis as Glen Scully
- Nadia Sawalha as Mandy Kostakis
- Richard Ridings as Policeman at crash
- Alan Parnaby as Policeman at phone box

== Production ==
=== Development ===
The film was an original script by Michael Frayn, then better known as a novelist and playwright. Frayn wrote it on "spec". He said, "I had always wanted to write something about a man who is late because I have considerable problems in relation to that myself, and only get places early by enormous expenditure of psychic energy."

He showed it to theatrical producer Michael Codron, who had produced five Frayn works on stage including the hugely successful Benefactors and Noises Off, and asked if Codron would like to produce it. "I said, 'Why not?'" said the producer. "I've always been interested in movies."

Codron showed the script to Nat Cohen, who had backed many of Codron's theatrical ventures, and worked at EMI Films. Cohen gave the script to the company's head of production Verity Lambert and she agreed to finance. The title was originally Man of the Moment but this was changed when it was realised that had been used for a Norman Wisdom film.

John Cleese was signed to star. "No one will believe it but I didn't have an idea for casting," said Frayn.

Cleese later said the script was "the best I've ever seen. The same day it landed on my front door, I rang my agent and said, 'I have to do this.' "

"Stimpson is a victim of circumstance," Cleese said. "As the pressures increase, his behaviour becomes more and more erratic. Comedy is about things always going wrong, and that's just what happens to him. When you first see him, he's in charge. But as events take over and he can't cope-that's when he falls apart."

Codron, Cleese and Lambert had a meeting to decide the director. They selected Chris Morahan, who had directed Frayn's Chekhov adaptation Wild Honey on stage and had recently directed Jewel in the Crown for TV.

=== Filming ===
Filming took eight weeks in June and July 1985 in Hull, Shropshire and Birmingham. Filming locations in Hull included Hull Paragon Interchange, Cottingham Road and Ganstead Lane, as well as West Ella Way in nearby Kirk Ella. Filming in Grimsby took place on Friday 7 June 1985, at Diana, Princess of Wales Hospital, and moved from there to Birmingham, with 24 year old nurse Sue Tilley.

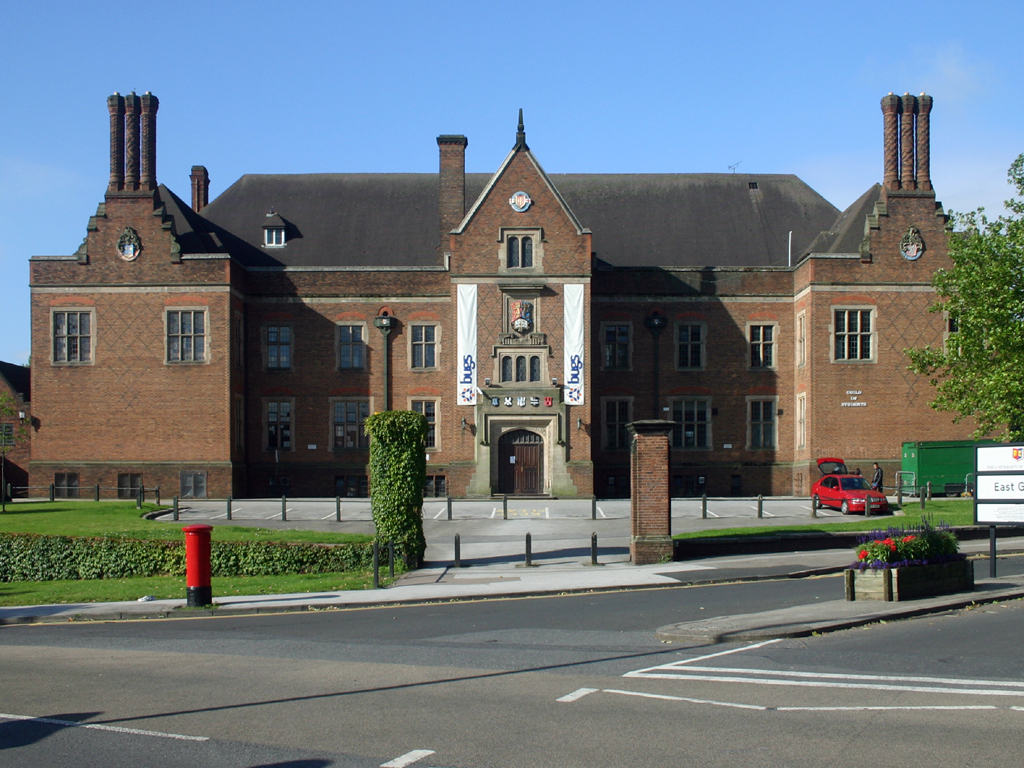
University of Birmingham Guild of Students, where the final scenes were held, filmed on 20 June 1985

The road accident scene with a police car was on the A491 at Hagley, Worcestershire, near Field Road on Thursday 13 June 1985. The assembly scene was filmed at Menzies High School in West Bromwich on Tuesday 18 June 1985, with headteacher Ian Pedder.

The university scene included the University of Birmingham Guild of Students building from 20 to 21 June 1985. Filming moved to Wenlock Priory in late June 1985, in Much Wenlock in Shropshire.

Cleese recalled "I wanted to see if I could get through eight weeks' filming and finish in reasonably good form, feeling physically OK and mentally together and not exhausted. And I managed it fine by the simple expedient of getting to bed very early and having my masseur work on me for forty-five minutes every night." However he smashed his left knee on a staircase and pulled a hamstring chasing a train at Hull station.

== Reception ==
=== Critical ===
The Daily Telegraph called it "a farcical comedy that could scarcely be more original or more consistently funny." "The film can't stay the distance," complained the Evening Standard.

The Los Angeles Times called it "so funny that it becomes quite literally painful to behold."

Halliwell's Film Guide awarded it one star from a possible four, stating "what was intended as an escalating climax of comic chaos falls away as the script runs out of steam, but the nation's need for comedy ensured box-office success". Radio Times reviewer John Ferguson awarded it three stars out of five, stating "Cleese finds it difficult to be unfunny and he unravels here much like Basil Fawlty, from a simmering starting point to a climax of epic proportions. Perhaps because of Cleese's background in TV comedy, the picture is less a narrative than a series of sketches, plus some rather awkwardly placed propaganda about public and private education in that far-off land called Mrs Thatcher's Britain." He concluded that it was "entertaining fare" but "doesn't stand comparison" with Cleese's next comedy film, A Fish Called Wanda (1988).

On review aggregator Rotten Tomatoes, the film has an approval rating of 80% based on 5 reviews.

=== Box office ===
Although popular in Britain (where it made nearly £5 million), the film only played art houses in the US, earning $1.6 million. This prompted Cleese to make A Fish Called Wanda to be accessible to American audiences, to "get out of the art houses" there. Cleese later recalled "there was a scene where I had to make a call from a public phone booth. None of the phones worked and I had to go from booth to booth with increasing fury before I found one that did. In England, that scene got a big laugh because no one here expects the phones to work. But it played to total silence in America, where they all expect to get through on a phone the first time."

Cleese also said "The only problem with the film is that it does make some people too nervous. . . . Clockwise is a very held-in film about a very held-in personality, and it does amuse me that the only other country that liked it at all was Sweden. Presumably they found Stimpson quite extrovert."

=== Legacy ===
A line spoken by Stimpson has become famous, "It's not the despair, Laura. I can stand the despair. It's the hope!" and has been quoted (and misquoted, often as "It's the hope I can't stand!") many times in newspapers and books.

Nat Cohen left EMI to become a consultant in 1986 and said he hoped to make "one or two more Clockwises from up and coming filmmakers" but he was credited on no more films until his death.

Codron tried to get finance for another Michael Frayn screenplay, First and Last, about an elderly man who decides to walk around the British coastline. Despite attaching Alec Guinness, Codron could not raise the finance and made no more films. First and Last was made for television in 1989 featuring Joss Ackland.

== Home media ==
Clockwise was first released in the United Kingdom on PAL VHS on 28 June 1994. It was then released on UK Region 2 DVD on 4 December 2001 and re-released on DVD on 21 August 2006. In 2018 the original film negatives were scanned in 1080i and Clockwise was released on Blu-ray on 18 November 2019. All home media releases were distributed by Studiocanal.

== Notes ==
- Frayn, Michael (1986). Clockwise : a screenplay. Methuen.
- Margolis, Jonathan (1992). Cleese encounters. St. Martin's Press.
