= Trevor Sheldon =

British academic

- Awards: FMedSci
- Scientific career
- Workplaces: Queen Mary University of London; University of York; Hull York Medical School; Kingston University; University of Leicester; University of Leeds
- Website: www.qmul.ac.uk/iphs/people/staff/-sheldon-trevor-a--iphs-.html

Trevor A. Sheldon is a British academic and University administrator who is a former Deputy Vice-Chancellor of the University of York and Dean of Hull York Medical School. He has held academic posts at the University of York, the University of Leeds, the University of Leicester and Kingston University.

== Education ==
Trevor Sheldon studied medicine at St Mary's Hospital Medical School, London, (including a one year fellowship in community medicine at Albert Einstein College of Medicine, New York). He was awarded a Master of Science degree from the University of London in Economics, an MSc in Medical Statistics followed by a DSc from the Faculty of Medicine, University of Leicester.

== Career ==
Trevor Sheldon joined Queen Mary University of London as Professor of Health Services Research in July 2020. www.qmul.ac.uk/wiph/people/profiles/sheldon-trevor-a--iphs-.html Between October 2007 and April 2012 he was the Deputy Vice-Chancellor of the University of York. He was Professor of Health Services Research and Policy in the Department of Health Sciences at the University of York and Research Mentor at the Bradford Institute of Health Research, Bradford Royal Infirmary. He also chairs the board of the York Health Economics Consortium. He was the Dean of the Hull York Medical School from 2013-2017.

== Research ==
His publications and research specialities include the effectiveness and cost-effectiveness of healthcare and public health interventions, including health care quality and the measurement and management of health care performance; policy development and evaluation; resource allocation in health care and the public sector; research methods including evidence synthesis and experimental evaluation of complex interventions: https://orcid.org/0000-0002-7479-5913

He joined the University of York in 1992, first as Senior Research Fellow in the Centre for Health Economics; a Professor from 1996, he became founding Director of the National Health Service (NHS) Centre for Reviews and Dissemination. In 1999 he became Head of the University's Department of Health Sciences and deputy Chair of the Commissioning Board for Service Delivery and Organisation of the NHS research programme. He was appointed Pro-Vice-Chancellor in 2004 with the portfolio of Teaching, Learning and Information.

== Awards and honours ==
Sheldon was elected Fellow (FMedSci) of the Academy of Medical Sciences, United Kingdom in 2000, a member of the Society for Social Medicine and the US Academy Health.
