= Centre for Reviews and Dissemination =

University of York health services research centre

The Centre for Reviews and Dissemination (CRD) is a health services research centre based at the University of York, England. CRD was established in January 1994, and aims to provide research-based information for evidence-based medicine. CRD carries out systematic reviews and meta-analyses of healthcare interventions, and disseminates the results of research to decision-makers in the NHS.

CRD produces three databases:

- Database of Abstracts of Reviews of Effects (DARE)
- NHS Economic Evaluation Database (NHS EED)
- Health Technology Assessment Database (HTA Database)

These are freely available from the CRD database website, NIHR Centre for Reviews and Dissemination - CRD Database, and as part of the Cochrane Library.

CRD also publishes a number of regular reports including Effective Health Care and Effectiveness Matters.

CRD is funded by the UK Department of Health's NHS Research and Development Programme, as well as from a number of other sources.

== History ==
CRD was established in 1994. Along with the UK Cochrane Centre, the centre was originally created as part of the Information Systems Strategy of the NHS Research and Development Programme.

The original aims of the centre were:

- To carry out and commission systematic reviews of research findings on the effectiveness and cost effectiveness of health care relevant to the NHS
- To improve the accessibility of these and other research reviews by maintaining and updating an international register of research reviews and providing a single access point to this information for enquirers in the NHS
- To provide simple and effective mechanisms by which the results of systematic reviews on the clinical effectiveness, cost-effectiveness and acceptability of health service interventions can be communicated rapidly to relevant audiences

Professor Trevor Sheldon established and directed CRD from 1994 to 1998. He was followed as director by Professor Jos Kleijnen from 1998 to 2005. The current director is Professor Lesley Stewart who took up appointment in 2006.

== About ==
The Centre for Reviews and Dissemination (CRD) is a department of the University of York. CRD is one of the largest groups in the world engaged exclusively in evidence synthesis in the health field. The Centre comprises health researchers, medical information specialists, health economists and a dissemination team.

CRD undertakes systematic reviews evaluating the research evidence on health and public health questions. The findings of CRD reviews are widely disseminated and have impacted on health care policy and practice, both in the UK and internationally.

CRD produce the DARE, NHS EED and HTA databases which are used by health professionals, policy makers and researchers.

CRD also undertake methods research and produce internationally accepted guidelines for undertaking systematic reviews.

The centre's role in developing research evidence to support decision making in policy and practice was highlighted in the Cooksey report on UK health research funding and subsequently in the Government national research strategy Best Research for Best Health. CRD was also recognised by the Lancet as part of NHS R&D's most important contribution to the UK science base, namely building systematic review capacity and promulgating systematic reviews as a global public good.

== Funding and partners ==
CRD receives core funding through the NIHR. This funding enables the centre to function as a national resource and provides the necessary infrastructure to respond to requests from policy makers and healthcare professionals, and to support the provision and promotion of the online databases (DARE, NHS EED and HTA).

In addition to the core funding, the centre has undertaken independent research for a number of different agencies including:

- National Institute for Health and Clinical Excellence (NICE)
- NIHR Health Technology Assessment Programme (HTA)
- Department of Health Policy Research Programme (PRP)
- Economic and Social Research Council (ESRC)
- Home Office
- Medical Research Council (UK) (MRC)
- Social Care Institute for Excellence (SCIE)
- NHS Institute for Innovation and Improvement (NHS III)
- NIHR Service Delivery & Organisation Programme (SDO)

CRD is one of seven independent academic centres currently undertaking reviews commissioned by NICE. CRD collaborate with the Centre for Health Economics at the University of York to undertake technology assessment reviews that inform NICE Technology Appraisals on the use of new and existing medicines and treatments within the NHS.

CRD also has close links with the UK Cochrane Centre and contributes to the work of several of the Cochrane Collaboration’s Review and Methods groups. The centre also has representation on the Steering and User groups of the Campbell Collaboration and is a member of the International Network of Agencies for Health Technology Assessment (INAHTA).

CRD is a founder member of the Public Health Research Consortium (PHRC) with brings together researchers from 11 UK institutions. The PHRC aims to strengthen the evidence base for public health, with a strong emphasis on tackling socioeconomic inequalities in health. The centre is collaborating on a number of projects and is providing support for information retrieval and the knowledge transfer activities of the Consortium.
