= The Bill series 9 =

The Bill
- Series 9
- No. of episodes: 155

Release
- Original network: ITV
- Original release: 5 January – 31 December 1993

Series chronology
- ← Previous; Series 8 Next → Series 10

The ninth series of The Bill, a British television drama, consists of 155 episodes, broadcast between 5 January and 31 December 1993. As of the year's first episode, the series increased its weekly output to three 30-minute episodes, having been twice-weekly half-hour episodes since 1988.

== Storylines ==
The series saw a number of high-profile exits, including a shooting murder for WDC Viv Martella, the dismissal of DS Ted Roach for assaulting Inspector Andrew Monroe and the mysterious at the time exit of DI Frank Burnside, whose exit reason would not bpe revealed until he returned in 1998.

Characters from previous years joined the series, including DS Danny Pearce, who appeared as a DC from another station the previous year. In addition, Chief Inspector Philip Cato and DI Harry Haines joined after past guest stints; Haines, like Pearce, appeared the year before as DS Haines, while Cato had appeared in 1990 as the Inspector at Barton Street, the man who ended the career of Sergeant Tom Penny.

== Media release ==
The series was released on DVD for the first time on 3 October 2012, in Australia.

Audio commentaries have been released for the episodes "No Thanks To You" (with writer Candy Denman and director Jan Sargent), "Blind Spot" (with writer Roger Davenport), "On the Loose" (with writer Candy Denman and director Laurence Moody) and "Compliments of the Service" with actor Mike Burnside (DAC Trevor Hicks).

== Cast changes ==
=== Arrivals ===
- Ch Insp Philip Cato (Episode 4–)
- Sgt Jane Kendall (Episode 11–)
- PC Mike Jarvis (Episode 13–)
- WPC Suzi Croft (Episode 17–)
- WDC Jo Morgan (Episode 28–)
- DS Danny Pearce (Episode 60–)
- Sgt Ray Steele (Episode 85–)
- DI Harry Haines (Episode 108–)

=== Departures ===
- WDC Viv Martella – Shot dead on duty
- PC Ron Smollett – Unexplained
- DS Ted Roach – Resigned after assaulting Inspector Andrew Monroe
- PC Barry Stringer – Transferred after resigning as Fed Rep
- Sgt John Maitland – Transferred to Hendon
- DI Frank Burnside – Joined what later became the National Crime Squad for undercover work
- Sgt Jane Kendall – Unexplained
- DI Harry Haines – Transferred back to the Drugs Squad

== Episodes ==
No. in series	Title	Directed by	Written by	Episode notes	Original release date
1	"A Dying Breed"	Chris Clough	Chris Ould	Title sequence updated; Elizabeth Rider guest stars	5 January 1993
CID investigate the discovery of a decomposing body, while Carver is shot at after intervening at a jewel shop robbery; a geriatric ex-con could be key to solving both cases.
2	"Fact of Life"	Derek Lister	Julian Jones	Tim Matthews guest stars	7 January 1993
The law allows a known burglar to go free, so Greig and Quinnan join forces to pin him down again.
3	"All Through the Night"	Jeremy Silberston	John Wilsher	—	8 January 1993
Stamp expects a dull evening on the party patrol – until he is paired with pretty young Environmental Health Officer Diane Eckersley.
4	"New Tune, Old Fiddle"	Laurence Moody	John Wilsher	First appearance of Ch Insp Philip Cato; Bob Mason guest stars	12 January 1993
Conway is disappointed when Brownlow does not consider him for a new post as Community Liaison Officer – so he applies without his knowledge.
5	"Delinquent"	Chris Lovett	Victoria Taylor	Stephanie Turner and Dickon Tolson guest star	14 January 1993
Quinnan arrests a persistent young offender accused of burgling his parents' house.
6	"Bringing Up Baby"	Matthew Evans	Edward Canfor-Dumas	Daniel Flynn and Jacqueline Defferary guest star	15 January 1993
The delusions of a mentally unstable woman leaves CID and uniform racing against the clock to find her missing newborn baby.
7	"Rainy Days and Mondays"	Sarah Anderson	Trevor Wadlow	Zoe Telford guest stars	19 January 1993
Loxton and Marshall investigate claims of indecent assault at a woman's hostel, but while a night guard is accused, the warden also comes under fire.
8	"Supply and Demand"	Chris Clough	Joanne Maguire	Gareth Armstrong, Richard Beale and Shirin Taylor guest star	21 January 1993
Harris visits Jardine, the joint founder of Operation Bumblebee, while Garfield takes on a complaint about a pornographic home video on a recorder bought by an infuriated elderly man.
9	"On the Cards"	Jan Sargent	Gregory Evans	Adrienne Burgess and Andrew McCulloch guest star	22 January 1993
Martella is taken off a two-week-old murder hunt to work on a case involving obscene phone calls, but could they be linked to the murder?
10	"Shock to the System"	David Attwood	Christopher Russell	First appearance of Sgt Jane Kendall; Shaun Dingwall and Lisa Coleman guest star	26 January 1993
Brownlow is furious to learn Hicks has appointed Conway as the new area Community Liaison Officer. Lamont is determined to join the team to get off shift work, but faces stiff competition from Prescott Street's Jane Kendall.
11	"Living It Down"	David Attwood	Ron Rose	Jane Danson and Melanie Hill guest star	28 January 1993
Social worker Lynda Chambers assists Burnside and Martella in the search for a missing victim of abuse.
12	"Heat of the Moment"	Sarah Anderson	Edward Canfor-Dumas	Julie Buckfield guest star	29 January 1993
Martella clashes with Meadows while investigating the murder of an alleged domestic abuser.
13	"Shake, Rattle 'N' Roll"	George Case	Susan Shattock	First appearance of PC Mike Jarvis; Marcia Warren and Shaun Scott guest star	2 February 1993
PC Mike Jarvis gets a less than warm welcome to Sun Hill, while Marshall demands Monroe takes action against crooked pub landlord Terry McGill. Notes: Shaun Scott would join the cast as DS, later DI, Chris Deakin in 1994.
14	"No Thanks to You"	Jan Sargent	Candy Denman	Raymond Llewellyn and Elizabeth Estensen guest star	4 February 1993
Garfield has a bad day when he fails to save the life of a glue sniffer, then allows a bail absconder to escape. In 2021, writer Candy Denman and director Jan Sargent recorded an audio commentary for this episode, released on The Bill Podcast Patreon Channel.
15	"A Better Life"	Andrew Higgs	Roy MacGregor	Sean Maguire guest stars	5 February 1993
Greig and Ackland are intrigued by an elderly burglary victim seemingly defending the prime suspect.
16	"Echo"	Bill Pryde	Peter Hammond	Adrian Rawlins guest stars	9 February 1993
Woods and Carver struggle to get a cocky suspect to admit his role in the disappearance of a young girl.
17	"Fagins"	Brian Farnham	Julian Jones	First appearance of WPC Suzi Croft	11 February 1993
WPC Suzi Croft joins the Operation Bumblebee team, and Burnside launches raids to make sure the public knows they mean business.
18	"Cried Too Late"	Chris Lovett	Matthew Wingett	Gerda Stevenson guest stars	12 February 1993
Datta investigates a woman arrested for shoplifting when she admits being a victim to domestic violence.
19	"Gone for a Soldier"	Brian Farnham	Steve Trafford	Charles De'Ath and Renu Setna guest star	16 February 1993
Ackland is teamed up with the military police's DS Dakin to find a young soldier, David Armstrong, who has gone Absent Without Leave with an army gun.
20	"Persuasion"	Richard Holthouse	Marianne Colbran	Sue Devaney guest stars	18 February 1993
Greig investigates an apparent war over territory between drug dealers.
21	"Hard Man"	Andrew Higgs	Carolyn Jones	—	19 February 1993
Greig investigates a stabbing and uncovers benefit fraud at a bed and breakfast.
22	"Missionary Work"	William Brayne	Steve Trafford	Emma Bunton, Simone Hyams, Muriel Pavlow, Fanny Carby and Peter Gunn guest star	23 February 1993
Conway has to decide which of two grant bids he should recommend to Hicks; he and Garfield want to use police funds to support a local youth club, but Cato and Brownlow have their own ideas.
23	"Hypocritical Oath"	Andrew Higgs	Matthew Bardsley	Kenneth Farrington and Anastasia Hille guest star	25 February 1993
The overdose of a boy on the Cockcroft Estate enables Woods and Carver to link registered addicts to a doctor.
24	"Trivial Pursuits"	Brian Parker	Len Collin	Jeremy Bulloch guest stars	26 February 1993
Loxton is feeling despondent about the lack of action on the job, but after a domestic turns sour, he ends up staring down the barrel of a gun.
25	"Out of the Mouths"	Graeme Harper	Duncan Gould	Colin Spaull, David Simeon, John Leeson and Nathan Constance guest star	2 March 1993
Hollis takes the Bumblebee message into a local school, asking for help in the fight against burglary, but one of the boys asks him to help end a domestic nightmare.
26	"Keeping In Touch"	George Case	Anthony Valentine	Frank Mills and Daphne Oxenford guest star	4 March 1993
An employee of a private security firm is accused of assaulting a blind elderly woman.
27	"If It Isn't Hurting"	Paul Unwin	Tony Etchells	Madhav Sharma and Wendy Williams guest star	5 March 1993
New trainee constable Croft learns some old style policing methods from Burnside.
28	"Keeping Out of Trouble"	Brian Parker	Michael Jenner	First appearance of WDC Jo Morgan	9 March 1993
A woman claims to have inside information about a series of violent raids on petrol stations, which are nipped in the bud by Meadows and Roach.
29	"School of Hard Knocks"	Graeme Harper	Robert Jones	Shirley Stelfox, Ivor Roberts and Nick Brimble guest star	11 March 1993
Burnside investigates the abduction of a boy by his ex-convict father, but it's his stepfather who Burnside is targeting – a suspected supplier in counterfeit cash. Stamp and Ackland's pursuit of teenagers stealing milk bottles from the same street yields more than they suspected.
30	"A Little Family Business"	Michael Simpson	Steve Trafford	Margery Mason guest stars	12 March 1993
Meadows investigates a burglary that leads to a keyholder's death, and Cato guns for Loxton and Stringer when the man's grieving son says they took too long to attend.
31	"Breaking the Chain"	Bill Pryde	Jonathan Myerson	—	16 March 1993
Kendall tries to keep a young offender from a life of crime.
32	"The Fortress"	Bill Pryde	Philip Palmer	—	18 March 1993
The owner of an off licence shop makes a citizen's arrest of a young shoplifter, but Maitland arrests the shopkeeper for use of unreasonable force.
33	"In Broad Daylight"	Richard Holthouse	Roy MacGregor	Nick Moran guest stars	19 March 1993
While on the trail of two rapists, Morgan investigates an attempted abduction and puts her life in danger.
34	"Credible Witness"	Diana Patrick	Joanne Maguire	Hugh Futcher guest stars	23 March 1993
Stringer is subject to rib-poking when an apparent witness to an armed robbery proves to be the culprit.
35	"The Price of Fame"	Haldane Duncan	Lizzie Mickery	Georgina Cates and Margot Leicester guest star	25 March 1993
Page goes undercover as a model to investigate a possible scam at a modelling agency.
36	"The Short Straw"	William Brayne	Russell Lewis	Final appearance of WDC Viv Martella	26 March 1993
Martella misses a key briefing on a gang of armed robbers, and tragedy unfolds when she stops to talk with them.
37	"Missing"	Roger Gartland	Christopher Russell	David Hargreaves and Tim Preece guest star	30 March 1993
As CID reel in the wake of Martella's death, Meadows tasks an under-fire Burnside with investigating the disappearance of a mentally disabled man.
38	"Goods Received"	Diana Patrick	Julian Spilsbury	Eamon Boland and James Marcus guest star	1 April 1993
Greig investigates a burglary at an ailing business, a case that leads him to a missing schoolboy.
39	"Double Enmity"	Paul Unwin	David Hoskins	Paul Moriarty and Connor Byrne guest star	2 April 1993
Woods goes undercover as a contract killer to expose a woman who wants her husband killed.
40	"Hard Evidence"	Laurence Moody	Tony Etchells	Conleth Hill and Ken Bones guest star	6 April 1993
AMIP assist CID on a fatal stabbing but Meadows and Woods are unnerved by a mutual contact on the squad.
41	"High Hopes And Low Life"	John Darnell	Roy MacGregor	Final appearance of PC Ron Smollett; Peter Benson and Sharon Maiden guest star	8 April 1993
Carver and Morgan investigate a career ending attack on a promising young boxer.
42	"On the Loose"	Laurence Moody	Candy Denman	Michelle Joseph, Allan Surtees and Hilda Fenemore guest star	9 April 1993
Loxton and Garfield corner a savage pit bull terrier at an illegal dogfight, while Boyden tracks down a pensioner who has turned to crime. In 2022, writer Candy Denman and director Laurence Moody recorded a video commentary for this episode
43	"Out of Court"	Jim Goddard	Mark Holloway	Jack Smethurst, James Bree and Timothy Walker guest star	13 April 1993
Stamp and Ackland are keen to get a conviction against a woman for assault on a minicab driver, but she is acquitted.
44	"Bedfellows"	Jan Sargent	Christopher Russell	Ace Bhatti and Raji James guest star	15 April 1993
Cato arrests two youths, and his actions cause a riot outside Sun Hill station.
45	"Cat and Mouse"	John Darnell	Sebastian Secker-Walker	Natalie Roles guest stars	17 April 1993
A woman is keen to get rid of her burglar boyfriend and his fence, with whom she has been having an affair. Notes: Natalie Roles would join the cast as DS Debbie McAllister in 2000.
46	"Brothers"	Roger Gartland	Chris Lang	Jake Wood guest stars	20 April 1993
Two young brothers are suspected of burglary, and Croft discovers that they were deserted by their mother.
47	"Playing Away"	Ed Braman	Chris Ould	Geraldine Somerville guest stars	22 April 1993
Ackland arrests a fifteen-year-old boy for shoplifting and finds herself investigating his relationship with a woman twenty years his senior.
48	"Coming to Terms"	Jeremy Silbertson	Roy MacGregor	Stephen Churchett and Maureen O'Brien guest star	24 April 1993
The parents of a young man awaiting trial for the murder of a child are distressed when their home is broken into and they receive threatening phone call.
49	"Return to Sender"	Jeremy Silbertson	Michael Jenner	Andy Serkis and Joseph Kpobie guest star	27 April 1993
A young postwoman is beaten up but the motive is unclear and she seems unwilling to talk to the police.
50	"Sticks and Stones"	Betsan Morris	David Lane	Tenniel Evans guest stars	29 April 1993
Lines hits the jackpot during a raid, making an already difficult court case for Greig even harder.
51	"Tangled Webs"	David Attwood	Ron Rose	James Gaddas and Julia Ford guest star	1 May 1993
A mysteriously unmotivated break-in at a garage leads Burnside to a web of sexual deception and a jealous husband's rampage.
52	"Recruiting Officer"	Ed Braman	Len Collin	Ray Ashcroft and Ian Burfield guest stars	4 May 1993
Maitland enlists McCann's help in reassuring a young black applicant whose wife has serious misgivings about the job, but McCann is discovering racism within the force for himself. Notes: Ray Ashcroft would join the cast as DS Geoff Daly in 1996.
53	"Give 'Em An Inch"	Ken Horn	Duncan Gould	Ralph Ineson guest stars	6 May 1993
Cato allows a demonstration to go ahead despite being warned that it could be hijacked by racists.
54	"By Hook or By Crook"	Haldane Duncan	Anthony Valentine	Neil Stuke guest stars	8 May 1993
Roach is disgusted when a judge halts the trial of a man accused of crippling a police officer and decides to take matters into his own hands.
55	"Home to Roost"	Chris Clough	Julian Spilsbury	Ricky Tomlinson and Gordon Salkilld guest star	11 May 1993
Quinnan and Stamp attend to an assault victim at the market, while Kendall organises an outing to take some local kids to Chessington World of Adventures with a reluctant Loxton in tow.
56	"In Safe Hands"	Chris Clough	Steve Trafford	Daniela Denby-Ashe guest stars	13 May 1993
Woods and Morgan arrest two members of a shoplifting team.
57	"Punch Drunk"	Michael Simpson	Edward Canfor-Dumas	Final regular appearance of DS Ted Roach	15 May 1993
Quinnan and Stamp are stunned to find a man accused of assault in a pub is one of their own.
58	"Fall Out"	Anthony Quinn	James Mavor	—	18 May 1993
With the departure of Roach, one of his informants wants out. Burnside and Morgan investigate threats against her.
59	"Away Days"	Laurence Moody	Peter Hammond	Victoria Plucknett and Glyn Houston guest star	20 May 1993
Lines investigates when an elderly ex-copper in London searching for his estranged daughter claims he has been robbed in his hotel.
60	"Pride and Joy"	Betsan Evans	Chris Ould	First appearance of DS Danny Pearce; Anne Reid, Matilda Ziegler, Tim Wylton and David Sibley guest star	22 May 1993
When a young woman's car is stolen with a baby on board, CID fear an abduction and mount a search. Meanwhile, Garfield tries to mediate with a private clamping firm.
61	"Fast Food"	Ian White	Margaret Phelan	Pui Fan Lee, Robert Blythe and Larry Martyn guest star	25 May 1993
Carver and Woods are caught napping when a street robber escapes from under their noses. Loxton is accused of stealing money from a prisoner.
62	"Soft Touch"	Anthony Quinn	Robert Jones	Michael Carter guest stars	27 May 1993
Stamp's driving prowess is questioned when he fails to stop a runaway road-roller, and Jarvis finds a revolver in a rubbish bin while Burnside investigates a murder confession.
63	"We Gave Him All Our Love"	David Attwood	Michael Russell	Polly James and Steven Arnold guest stars	29 May 1993
When the body of a 14-year-old boy is washed up by the tide, Cryer feels that he owes the parents an explanation.
64	"Hearts and Minds"	Derek Lister	Tony Etchells	—	1 June 1993
Burnside disagrees with Conway's approach to a young offender.
65	"Cry Baby"	Derek Lister	Edward Canfor-Dumas	—	3 June 1993
Meadows investigates when a cot death proves suspicious.
66	"A Willing Victim"	Jim Goddard	Isabelle Grey	Albert Moses, Robert Gwilym, Lee MacDonald and Denise van Outen guest star	5 June 1993
Garfield introduces a boxer friend to a business manager – unaware that Pearce has the manager under investigation.
67	"Rank Outsider"	Laurence Moody	Susan Shattock	—	8 June 1993
Loxton's prisoner is released after Page makes a mistake in the CAD room, so Loxton and Jarvis scramble to get the prisoner back before Cato finds out.
68	"Tender Mercies"	Ken Horn	Jane Woodrow	Ann Davies guest stars	10 June 1993
Datta assists a woman who has reported her husband missing, while Lines uncovers a loan-sharking operation.
69	"Double Take"	Haldane Duncan	Anthony Valentine	Vilma Hollingbery and Peter Miles guest star	12 June 1993
Greig and Croft are sceptical while investigating an alleged burglary.
70	"Mouth and Trousers"	Michael Simpson	Len Collin	Final appearance of PC Barry Stringer; Daragh O'Malley guest stars	15 June 1993
Stringer clashes with Cato about a serious shortage of officers and the ban on overtime. Meanwhile, two families fight out their differences.
71	"Uses and Abuses"	Michael Simpson	Joan Maguire / Geoff McQueen	Charlotte Avery, Souad Faress and Frances Ruffelle guest star	16 June 1993
A woman walking home late at night thinks she is being followed by a young man and blinds him with oven cleaner; is it self-defence or assault?
72	"Picking a Winner"	Haldane Duncan	Michael Jenner	Amanda Abbington guest stars	19 June 1993
Quinnan goes undercover as a binman to investigate a series of burglaries.
73	"Broken"	John Bruce	Roy MacGregor	Brian Glover guest stars	22 June 1993
Monroe deals with the case of an alcoholic former coal miner who tries to organise exploited workers.
74	"Insider Dealing"	John Strickland	Julian Spilsbury	Donald Douglas and Philip Martin Brown guest star	24 June 1993
A prisoner admits to crimes he did not commit to gain a transfer.
75	"To Have and To Hold"	Sarah Anderson	Edward Canfor-Dumas	Alex Kingston guest stars	26 June 1993
Burnside investigates when a woman alleges rape by her estranged husband.
76	"Honour Among Thieves"	John Strickland	Joanne Maguire	Trevor Peacock guest stars	29 June 1993
Burnside questions three robbers after a botched getaway and is given conflicting stories as they try to incriminate one another.
77	"Somebody to Love"	Ian White	Marianne Colbran	Victoria Alcock, Jimmy Yuill and Jo Kendall guest star	1 July 1993
Datta tries to help a battered wife. Meanwhile, Ackland and Greig find some strange connections when a burglary is linked to a lonely hearts advert.
78	"Morning Has Broken"	Sarah Anderson	Gregory Evans	WDC Jo Morgan is promoted to WDS; Michael Elwyn guest stars	3 July 1993
Monroe acts quickly after a tip-off about a robbery at a supermarket. Meanwhile, CID try to foil a kidnapping and robbery plot, only to be impeded by lack of resources.
79	"Swaps"	Laurence Moody	Duncan Gould	Gabrielle Blunt and Tony Aitken guest star	6 July 1993
Loxton and Garfield swap jobs: Loxton has to deal with the new screen phones in the CAD room, while Garfield attends a fatal RTA.
80	"Trust"	Aisling Walsh	Marianne Colbran	Bronagh Gallagher and Lee Ross guest star	8 July 1993
Greig suspects that his informant is giving him the run around, but it becomes clear that she is being fed false information.
81	"Divided We Fall"	James Cellan Jones	Ron Rose	Caroline John guest stars	10 July 1993
A man found knocking on old people's doors turns out to be suffering from paranoid schizophrenia and attempting to contact family members, but Cryer realises that one old lady has cause to be afraid.
82	"A Duty of Care"	Indra Bhose	Philip Palmer	Richard Moore guest stars	13 July 1993
Cryer is convinced negligence is involved when a teenager dies in a forklift accident.
83	"Family Values"	Graham Theakston	James Stevenson	Tilly Vosburgh guest stars	15 July 1993
Jarvis assists the investigation into a violent lorry hijack in which the driver suffered a fatal head injury.
84	"A Matter of Life and Death"	Aisling Walsh	Christopher Long	Final appearance of Sgt John Maitland; Peter Gilmore guest stars	17 July 1993
An elderly man is arrested for beating his wife, but the couple have a bigger secret to hide. Quinnan is found guilty of dangerous driving.
85	"Kith and Kin"	Indra Bhose	Isabelle Grey	First appearance of Sgt Ray Steele; Oscar James guest stars	20 July 1993
When a woman is hospitalised, her son burgles her house and steals money, and her daughter starts to strip the house of its contents. Garfield and Marshall are forced to change their minds about a young offender who has befriended the woman, and to whom she has bequeathed her house.
86	"Part of the Family"	Michael Offer	Clive Hopkins	Lolita Chakrabarti and Nadim Sawalha guest star	22 July 1993
The theft of a necklace reveals a case of domestic violence against a young Bangladeshi woman. Police examine immigration laws and find that she has no freedom at all. Notes: Lolita Chakrabarti would join the cast as WPC Jamila Blake in 1996.
87	"Mighty Atoms"	Alex Kirby	Neil Clarke	Jonny Lee Miller guest stars	24 July 1993
Hours after a tough warning from Conway, a notorious young offender is in trouble again, and he holds the clue to the whereabouts of a missing teenager.
88	"A Malicious Prosecution"	James Cellan Jones	Julian Jones	Timothy Walker guest stars	27 July 1993
A civil action is brought against Garfield, Marshall and Cryer for wrongful arrest, malicious prosecution and false imprisonment. Meanwhile, Quinnan is accused of assaulting a college student.
89	"Outbreak"	Michael Offer	Stephen C. Handley	Joanna Hole and Trevor Byfield guest star	27 July 1993
Morgan and Croft question prison officers who fell asleep as a violent convict absconded.
90	"Unreliable Witness"	Chris Lovett	Steve Griffiths	Eddie Marsan and Patsy Palmer guest star	31 July 1993
A timid music teacher is intimidated by a violent ex-pupil, while Cato is furious when Garfield lets a thief get away.
91	"Sweet Charity"	Chris Clough	Len Collin	Stuart Organ guest stars	3 August 1993
Hollis and Stamp are caught in the crossfire when a mother and daughter fall out over a mutual boyfriend. Meanwhile, Cryer pursues bogus charity workers.
92	"David and Goliath"	Chris Lovett	Duncan Gould	Natasha Pyne guest stars	5 August 1993
Jarvis intercedes on behalf of a teenage boy when his mother refuses to testify against her husband – and son's alleged abuser.
93	"What a Pair"	John Bruce	Lizzie Mickery	Marjorie Yates guest stars	7 August 1993
Ackland arranges a date with a man working for an illegal escort agency suspected of stealing cash and credit cards from his female clients.
94	"Desirable Property"	John Bruce	Mark Holloway	—	10 August 1993
Quinnan enlists the assistance of an estate agent to investigate a series of burglaries.
95	"Blind Spot"	Matthew Evans	Roger Davenport	John Simm guest stars	12 August 1993
Jarvis and McCann are torn when Pearce suggests they lie about witnessing a suspect committing an assault they are certain he is guilty of. In 2019, writer Roger Davenport recorded an audio commentary for this episode
96	"Carrying the Load"	Matthew Evans	Michael Jenner	Tony Haygarth guest stars	14 August 1993
Morgan and Lines investigate a lorry hijack, with the husband of the depot owner seriously assaulted.
97	"Deadly Weapon"	Haldane Duncan	Graham Harvey	Alex Walkinshaw and Dave Atkins guest star	17 August 1993
The life of an unborn child hangs in the balance following a road traffic accident, and the investigation uncovers a trail of corruption. Notes: Alex Walkinshaw would join the case as PC Dale Smith in 1999.
98	"All the Wrong Connections"	Haldane Duncan	Roy MacGregor	Stephen Greif guest stars	19 August 1993
A girl accused of knocking down a young woman in the street has an alibi. Meadows crosses swords with an old enemy.
99	"Give and Take"	John Strickland	Elizabeth-Anne Wheal	Jaye Griffiths and Catherine Tate guest star	21 August 1993
Page is unsure of how to act when she witnesses a W.D.S. from Stafford Row plant drugs on a known dealer. Notes: Jaye Griffiths, as the newly-promoted DI Sally Johnson, would join the cast in 1994.
100	"Desperate Measures"	Sue Dunderdale	Candy Denman	Gordon Warnecke guest stars	24 August 1993
When a 15-year-old boy is driven to desperate measures, Ackland has to decide whether he or his mother is at risk.
101	"To Catch a Thief"	Sue Dunderdale	Lyndon Mallett	Robert Ashby, Peter Armitage and JoAnne Good guest star	26 August 1993
Carver arrests a pickpocket.
102	"Natural Reaction"	Michael Simpson	Tom Needham	Jane Slavin guest stars	28 August 1993
Carver and Lines question a man about his relationship with a 14-year-old thief.
103	"Desperate Remedies"	Andrew Higgs	Barry Simner	Paul Angelis, Linda Henry and Gerry Cowper guest star	31 August 1993
PC Garfield is tasked with retrieving an ill boy's inhaler, but comes up against a series of other problems while doing so.
104	"Bright Lights"	Michael Simpson	Peter Hammond	George Rossi guest stars	2 September 1993
Morgan goes all out to prove the guilt of an electrician suspected of sexual assault. Notes: George Rossi would join the cast as DC Duncan Lennox in 1998.
105	"Bare Faced Lies"	Alex Kirby	Lizzi Mickery	Final regular appearance DI Frank Burnside; Tracie Bennett and Carol Harrison guest star	4 September 1993
CID investigate the sale of stolen cigarettes and alcohol to pubs in the Sun Hill area. Burnside comes to the aid of an old friend, and Pearce goes to see a stripper.
106	"But Not Forgotten"	David Attwood	Russell Lewis	Brian Capron guest stars	7 September 1993
An important visitor comes to Sun Hill to see Burnside – but he has vanished.
107	"Push"	John Strickland	Mark Holloway	Lucy Speed and Edna Doré guest star	9 September 1993
Page gets stuck in a lift with a pregnant 15-year-old girl and has to assist with the birth. Notes: Lucy Speed would join the cast as DS Stevie Moss in 2008.
108	"Bad Reaction"	Moira Armstrong	Joanne Maguire	First appearance of DI Harry Haines	11 September 1993
Burnside's replacement Harry Haines arrives for his first day at Sun Hill, and helps track down a drug dealer who is distributing dangerous tablets. Note: The title sequence changed in this episode to remove departed characters Burnside and Stringer; for this episode only, a frame showed Ch Insp Cato talking to WPC Page, but in the following episode onwards the clip was replaced by a shot of DI Haines and DS Pearce
109	"Compliments of the Service"	Derek Lister	Anthony Valentine	Nigel Humphreys guest stars	14 September 1993
A public relations exercise by Brownlow is threatened by a drugs raid on the Jasmine Allen estate. In 2020, actor Mike Burnside (DAC Hicks) recorded an audio commentary for this episode.
110	"Game of Two Halves"	Andrew Higgs	Robert Jones	—	16 September 1993
Croft is in uniform for the day, much to the delight of Cato.
111	"The Knowledge"	Chris Clough	Michael Russell	Bill Stewart, Jimmi Harkishin and Daniel Abineri guest star	18 September 1993
Haines gets involved in a war between an Asian minicab firm and a black cab operator.
112	"No Place Like Home"	Graham Theakston	Tony Etchells	Final appearance of Sgt Jane Kendall	21 September 1993
Residents from the Greenfield Estate protest about the presence of an absconder from a nearby unit for young offenders.
113	"Customer Care"	Derek Lister	Trevor Wadlow	—	23 September 1993
Haines is annoyed by a young man who refuses to take an allegation of rape seriously. Loxton looks after two children left alone by their mother who have stolen £100 from a neighbour.
114	"The Right Man for the Job"	Jeremy Silbertson	Chris Ould	Joe Absolom, Count Prince Miller and Anthony Jackson guest star	25 September 1993
Boyden deals with a case of joyriding which ends with a crash and uncovers an insurance fraud.
115	"A Life in the Day Of"	Moira Armstrong	Edward Canfor-Dumas	Kate Maravan guest stars	28 September 1993
Loxton has a nightmare shift when first a woman whose car he allowed to park is clamped, and then when he is unable to prevent a young man from committing suicide.
116	"Having What It Takes"	Gill Wilkinson	Isabelle Grey	Diane Langton guest stars.	30 September 1993
When the youngest member of a notorious crime family comes into the station to confess to a three-year-old murder, Meadows hopes he will be able to clear up a case from his time at AMIP.
117	"Play the Game"	Aisling Walsh	Philip Palmer	Barry Stanton and Aidan Gillen guest star	2 October 1993
Cato's bullish tactics put noses out of joint after a pub brawl turns into a murder inquiry.
118	"Unlucky For Some"	David Attwood	Julian Spilsbury	Danny Dyer, Maggie Cronin and Helen Blatch guest star	5 October 1993
One of the employees at a bingo hall reveals that a robbery there was an inside job.
119	"Gift of the Gab"	Ted Clisby	Anthony Valentine	Dermot Crowley guest stars	7 October 1993
Pearce and Croft investigate fake telemarketers robbing pensioners.
120	"A Class Act"	Jeremy Woolf	Trevor Wadlow	Marc Warren guest stars	9 October 1993
When a drugs raid fails to deliver, it is Carver's dislike of a customer that reaps unexpected results.
121	"Dangerous Trade"	Jeremy Woolf	Graham Harvey	—	12 October 1993
A tragic accident involving a teenage boy alerts Page and Quinnan to an illegal trade in imported alcohol.
122	"Cheating Heart"	Nicholas Mallett	Scott Cherry	Amelda Brown, Christopher Blake and Bobby Knutt guest star	14 October 1993
Boyden deals with the consequences of two female investors rowing with a man intent on opening a bar in Spain.
123	"Somewhere To Hang My Hat"	Ted Clisby	Neil Clarke	Jean Heywood guest stars	16 October 1993
Morgan and Lines investigate when a former soldier is found at the bottom of a flight of stairs.
124	"No Comment"	Jeremy Silberston	Christopher Russell	Adam Blackwood guest stars	19 October 1993
Meadows has two suspects in custody while investigating an elderly man's murder, but struggles to work out who is responsible.
125	"Shrinkage"	Nicholas Mallett	Duncan Gould	Berwick Kaler, Vincent Regan, Martin Hancock, David Schaal and Ben Nealon guest star	21 October 1993
Cryer convinces Brownlow of the virtues of an arrest referral scheme offering counselling to those arrested on drugs offences. Meanwhile, Ackland and Quinnan hunt a gang of professional shoplifters.
126	"Street Legal"	Chris Lovett	James Stevenson	Mark Letheren guest stars	23 October 1993
Loxton investigates an assault and uncovers a ring of car thieves. Meanwhile, Hollis launches a one-man public relations drive.
127	"The Green Eyed Monster"	Laura Sims	Chris Lang	Billy Hartman guest stars	26 October 1993
Haines works with AMIP on a murder investigation and uncovers some secrets in the victim's past.
128	"Behind Closed Doors"	Gill Wilkinson	Sebastian Secker-Walker	Pal Aron guest stars	28 October 1993
A local community's quest for vigilante justice jeopardises the case of an Indian woman who is the victim of domestic violence. Notes: Pal Aron would join the cast as TDC Brandon Kane in 2002.
129	"Links in the Chain"	Laura Sims	Duncan Gould	Andrew Burt guest stars	30 October 1993
Cryer and Garfield investigate a break-in at a storage warehouse, putting Meadows on the trail of a small-time drug dealer with heavyweight connections.
130	"Care in the Community"	Chris Lovett	Jane Hollowood	Roberta Taylor, Geoffrey Hutchings, Barry Andrews and David Quilter guest star	2 November 1993
Quinnan and Garfield investigate when an old woman is found dead in an empty house. Jarvis arrests a violent youth for assault. Notes: Roberta Taylor would join the cast as Insp Gina Gold in 2002.
131	"You Don't Always Get What You Want"	Chris Clough	Stephen C. Handley	—	4 November 1993
Quinnan and Ackland support a C.I.D. raid on the house of a burglary suspect, while Croft and Greig try to persuade a young mother to help with their enquiries.
132	"Reason To Believe"	Ian White	Joanne Maguire	Billy Hartman guest stars	6 November 1993
Haines and Morgan work on a murder investigation with AMIP when a body is found after an office party.
133	"Let Slip"	Riitta Leena Lynn	Lyndon Mallet	—	9 November 1993
Page and Jarvis are called to deal when two rottweilers terrorise a shopping centre and attack a young girl.
134	"Until Proven Guilty"	Derek Lister	Sebastian Secker Walker	Tony Caunter guest stars	11 November 1993
Steele and Ackland find a man who has been beaten up to dissuade him from testifying against a vicious loan shark. The C.P.S. suggests dropping the case, but Meadows secures the assistance of a lesser villain to get the evidence for a prosecution.
135	"The Hard Sell"	Derek Lister	Michael Jenner	—	13 November 1993
Quinnan witnesses a robbery and suspects that a derelict shop is being used as an auction house for stolen property.
136	"Consequences"	Riitta Leena Lynn	Marianne Colbran	Tony Guilfoyle and Cheryl Hall guest star	16 November 1993
Meadows and Morgan lead a raid on a club in pursuit of a drug dealer who is laundering money through car sales.
137	"A Question of Identity"	Ian White	David Lane	—	18 November 1993
A neighbour spots an HIV-positive drug addict breaking into a house.
138	"Cutting Edge"	Michael Simpson	Terry Hodgkinson	Derek Newark and Godfrey James guest star	20 November 1993
Page and McCann are called to the scene of an aggravated burglary. There is a lot of blood at the scene, but it has not come from the victim.
139	"Put Down"	Michael Simpson	Edward Canfor-Dumas	Jeillo Edwards guest stars	23 November 1993
An invalid is found dead in bed, and the wife is charged with aiding and abetting a suicide.
140	"Left Behind"	Frank W. Smith	Judith Johnson	Albert Welling guest stars	25 November 1993
A convicted wife-beater has been released on parole; he, his wife and son all later end up in Sun Hill on suspicion of violent assaults.
141	"Real Villains"	Chris Clough	Gregory Evans	Dean Gaffney guest stars	27 November 1993
Croft and Cryer examine the remains of a burned-out car on the Whitegate estate, where residents are concerned about the increase in lawlessness.
142	"Questionable Judgement"	Paul Unwin	Candy Denman	Camilla Power, Martin Fisk and David Quilter guest star	30 November 1993
A homeless man is found murdered and a teenage girl has gone missing.
143	"Taking Care of Business"	Christopher Hodson	Steve Griffiths	—	2 December 1993
A store participating in Conway's business watch scheme has been burgled, and one of the suspects is beaten up.
144	"The Law in Their Hands"	Graeme Harper	Len Collin	Richard Davies guest stars	4 December 1993
Steele and Garfield arrest a father and son who assaulted the man they believe burgled their house, but Loxton and Quinnan catch another suspect.
145	"Cause For Complaint"	Frank W. Smith	Edwin Pearce	—	7 December 1993
Monroe investigates a complaint about an unattended emergency call, which the victim attributes to racial prejudice.
146	"Blood Counts"	Paul Unwin	Andy Garrett	Paul Barber guest stars	9 December 1993
A postman is attacked, and Carver discovers the remains of a mailbag in the embers of a fire. Pearce struggles with a false confession, while McCann is in trouble over a false arrest.
147	"Hurting Inside"	Peter Cattaneo	Harry Duffin	Oliver Smith guest stars	11 December 1993
A convicted burglar absconds while on day release from prison.
148	"Corroboration"	John Bruce	Margaret Phelan	Kevork Malikyan guest stars	14 December 1993
Carver and Jarvis are in court, but the case against a man accused of robbing a couple at knife point may fail because of poor identification evidence.
149	"Death of a Ladies' Man"	Chris Lovett	Marianne Colbran	—	16 December 1993
A woman reports her husband missing. Greig and Croft establish that the man is a bigamist and an armed robber.
150	"An Ill Wind"	Laurence Moody	Graham Harvey	Sally Knyvette guest stars	18 December 1993
A body is retrieved from a building yard where there has been a deadly toxic gas release.
151	"Keep on Trucking"	Graeme Harper	Duncan Gould	Russell Floyd guest stars	21 December 1993
Garfield solves a rash of holiday burglaries with his knowledge of tachographs.
152	"A Family Trait"	Aisling Walsh	Candy Denman	—	23 December 1993
Greig and Croft investigate an aggravated burglary. A fourteen-year-old thief, following in his father's footsteps, poses a problem for Morgan.
153	"Paid in Full"	John Bruce	Elizabeth-Anne Wheal	Arthur Cox and Sophie Stanton guest star	24 December 1993
Boyden foils a smash-and-grab raid at an electrical store, and thinks he deserves a reward, but Monroe sees things differently.
154	"Cause for Concern"	Christopher Hodson	Julian Spilsbury	Dean Harris and Ray Armstrong guest star	28 December 1993
Datta and Stamp have to unravel an unusual case of mistaken identity when a domestic dispute gets out of hand.
155	"Nothing Ventured"	Nick Laughland	Edward Canfor-Dumas	Final regular appearance of DI Harry Haines; Nick Miles and Donald Sumpter guest star	31 December 1993
When an informant tips Haines off about an LSD factory, he is eager to set up a drugs bust, but Meadows has other plans for him.
