= Uche Odouza =

Scottish rugby union player

Uche Oduoza
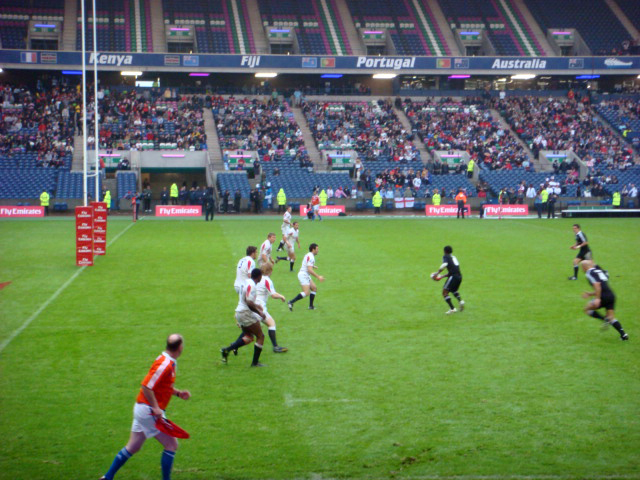
- Oduoza playing for England at the 2009 Scotland Sevens
- Born: Uche Oduoza; 15 October 1986 (age 40) Glasgow, Scotland
- Height: 6 ft 2 in (1.88 m)
- Weight: 104 kg (16 st 5 lb)
- University: Hull York Medical School

Rugby union career
- Position: Wing
Youth career
- Exeter Saracens RFC
- Worcester Warriors Academy
Senior career
Years	Team	Apps	(Points)
2005–2008	Worcester Warriors	14	(20)
2008–2009	Suntory Sungoliath	6	(10)
2009–2010	Newcastle Falcons	0	(0)
2011-2012	Leeds Carnegie	1	(0)
National sevens team
Years	Team		Comps
2008 –	England		

Uche Oduoza (born 15 October 1986 in Glasgow, Scotland) is an English retired rugby union player. Oduoza's position of choice is wing although he can also play fullback.

== Career ==
Born in Glasgow, Oduoza grew up in Exeter where he joined his local club side Exeter Saracens. He was spotted by Worcester's Academy Manager whilst representing England at Under 18 level. Oduoza later joined the Worcester Warriors Academy side and was a regular in the A league. He made his senior side debut in the European Cup against Italian side Rugby Rovigo whilst he was still at school in Wolverhampton and his league debut against local rivals Gloucester. He also spent time on loan at Birmingham and Solihull R.F.C.

Oduoza has represented his country at U18, U19, U21 levels and for the Sevens side. He scored a fantastic 98m try for England in the 2008 San Diego Sevens.

While competing for the England Sevens, Oduoza announced that he would be leaving Worcester for Japanese side Suntory Sungoliath after the 2007–08 season. It was also announced that he had rejected a new two-year deal at Worcester. He then returned to the Guinness Premiership for the 2009–10 season with Newcastle Falcons. Oduoza will be combining his rugby career with studying medicine at the Hull York Medical School.

At the end of the 2009–10 season due to his university commitments Oduoza had made only one appearance for the Falcons first team, starting in an LV Cup match against Worcester. In May 2010 he was named as an unattached player as part of the England Sevens squad at the Scotland Sevens in Edinburgh.

In early March 2011 Uduoza returned to train with England Sevens after recovering from a knee reconstruction. In early April he featured on the bench for the Leeds Carnegie "A" team against Northampton Saints Wanderers and made his first team debut for the club also against Northampton Saints in the Premiership. In June 2011 he was recalled to the England Sevens squad for the Moscow leg of the European Sevens Grand Prix.
