= North East Ambulance Service =

UK public sector ambulance service

North East Ambulance Service NHS Foundation Trust

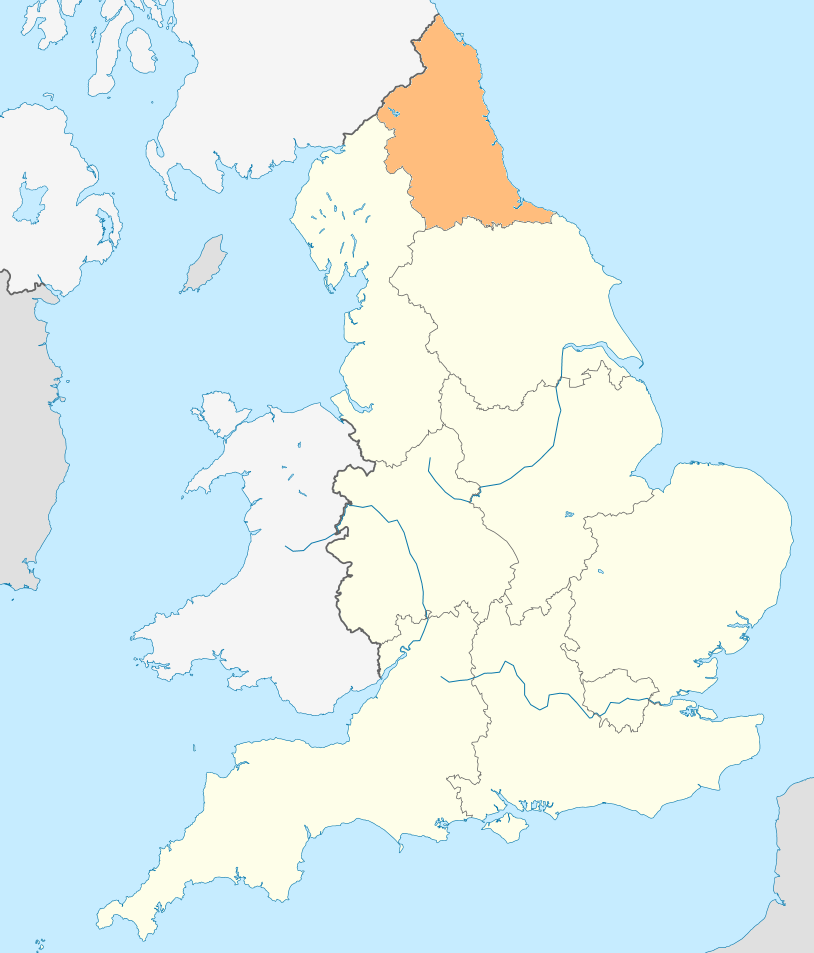
- Area served by the North East Ambulance Service
- Type: NHS foundation trust
- Established: 1 July 2006
- Headquarters: Newcastle Upon Tyne
- Region served: North East England
- Area size: 3,200 square miles
- Population: 2.6 million
- Chair: Professor Stuart Corbridge
- Chief executive: Kevin Scollay
- Staff: 2,635 (2019/20)
- Website: www.neas.nhs.uk

The North East Ambulance Service NHS Foundation Trust (NEAS) is an NHS foundation trust responsible for providing NHS ambulance services in North East England. Headquartered in Newcastle upon Tyne, NEAS provides emergency medical services to the metropolitan boroughs of Newcastle upon Tyne, Gateshead, North Tyneside, South Tyneside and City of Sunderland; the ceremonial counties of County Durham and Northumberland; and the area of North Yorkshire commonly known as Teesside. NEAS was formed on 1 July 2006, following the merger of the existing North East Ambulance Service with the Tees division of the Tees, East and North Yorkshire Ambulance Service (TENYAS). Northumbria Ambulance Service and County Durham Ambulance Service had previously merged on 1 April 1999.

NEAS is one of ten Ambulance Trusts providing England with emergency medical services, receiving direct government funding for its role. NEAS also provides patient transport services (PTS), or non-emergency services, to patients in the area.

== Geography ==
NEAS headquarters is currently at Bernicia House on Newburn Riverside, Newcastle upon Tyne.

There are three control rooms currently operating for NEAS, one at the Newcastle upon Tyne headquarters at Bernicia House in Newburn, one at Russell House in Hebburn, and one at Winter House in Billingham. 999 emergency calls and NHS 111 urgent care calls are answered by call takers at all three sites.

There are several stations across the North East run jointly with the local fire services such as Tyne and Wear Fire and Rescue Service and County Durham and Darlington Fire and Rescue Service.

== Performance ==
NEAS was one of four trusts in the country to receive a "good" rating in the 2006/7 Healthcare Commission Healthcheck report. This was the highest rating achieved by any ambulance service for provision of care.

Between April and October 2013, the service recorded 10,072 "incidents" in which handovers to hospital accident and emergency departments had taken longer than 30 minutes and 499 which took longer than one hour resulting in penalty fines of approximately £250,000 for the service.

In 2018, the trust said it would need to recruit 100 more paramedics in order to meet new ambulance performance targets.

The effect of the COVID-19 pandemic in England was that delayed ambulance response times became a "continuing theme due to the unprecedented demand the service is currently experiencing". In response to repeated complaints about patient harm the trust reported that "on each occasion demand outweighed available resources at the time these patients required an emergency ambulance" and that the board "can take assurance that in each of these cases no missed opportunities were found to send an ambulance sooner". In January 2022 call handlers were told they should consider asking patients with suspected strokes and heart attacks to be transported by friends or family because ambulance response times were under such pressure.

=== CQC performance rating ===
In its last inspection of the service in January 2023, the Care Quality Commission (CQC) gave the following ratings on a scale of outstanding (the service is performing exceptionally well), good (the service is performing well and meeting our expectations), requires improvement (the service isn't performing as well as it should) and inadequate (the service is performing badly):

Inspection Reports
Area	2016 Rating	2018 Rating	2023 Rating
Are services Safe?	Good	Good	Requires improvement
Are services Effective?	Good	Good	Requires improvement
Are services Caring	Good	Good	Good
Are services Responsive	Good	Good	Good
Are services Well-led	Good	Good	Inadequate
Overall rating	Good	Good	Requires improvement

== Services provided ==
- 999 emergency service
- Hazardous Area Response Team
- NHS 111 service
- Patient Transport Service
- Durham Urgent Care Transport (DUCT)
- Critical Care Paramedics

== Social media ==
In 16 August 2024, NEAS suspended its account on social media platform X, claiming the platform was "not consistent with our values" and was failing to "police content".

== Popular culture ==
NEAS featured as the host service of the ninth and tenth seasons of the BBC TV series Ambulance.

== See also ==
- Emergency medical services in the United Kingdom
- List of NHS trusts
