= Sharon Maiden =

British actress (born 1961)

Sharon Maiden (born 23 June 1961 in Ealing, London) is a British actress. She made her film debut opposite John Cleese in the 1986 movie Clockwise.

== Film and television appearances ==
- Full House (series 1, episode 6) 1985
- Five Alive 1986
- Clockwise 1986
- A Perfect Spy 'Milly' 1987
- The Comic Strip Presents... (series 3, episode 6) 1988
- The Bill Series 5 (episode 81 – A Matter of Trust) 1989
- Chelmsford 123 (series 2, episode 4) 1990
- The Bill Series 9 (episode 41 – High Hopes and Low Life) 1993
- London's Burning (series 6, episode 1) 1993
- Inspector Morse 2000
- Casualty 2003
- Footballer's Wives 2002
- Holby City 2008
- Doctors 2009
