= Goole and District Hospital =

- Northern Lincolnshire and Goole Hospitals NHS Foundation Trust
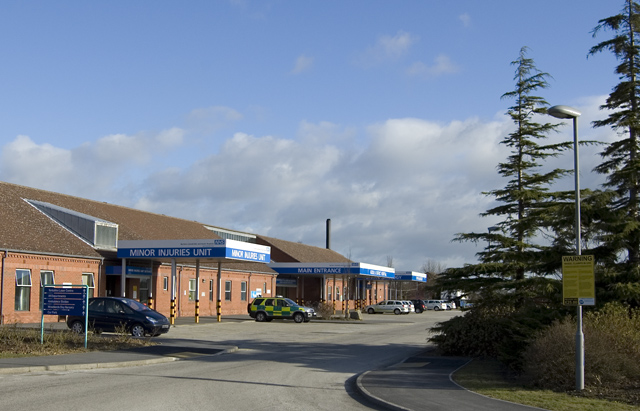
- Main entrance on Woodland Avenue

- Shown in the East Riding of Yorkshire

Geography
- Location: Goole, East Riding of Yorkshire, England
- Coordinates: 53.716556°N 0.874494°W

Organisation
- Care system: NHS

Services
- Emergency department: No, Urgent Treatment Centre only

History
- Founded: 1988

Links
- Website: www.nlg.nhs.uk
- Lists: Hospitals in England

Goole and District Hospital is a hospital in Goole, East Riding of Yorkshire, England. It is managed by Northern Lincolnshire and Goole Hospitals NHS Foundation Trust.

== History ==
The hospital, which replaced several smaller local hospitals, was purpose-built and opened in 1988. In March 2014 the East Riding Clinical Commissioning Group produced proposals for co-locating non-traditional health services on the Goole site because it considered that the current model of provision was not sustainable. However Goole was considered to be an area with high levels of deprivation in relation to other parts of the East Riding. It was envisaged that mental health, social care and education courses could be located on the site.

== See also ==
- List of hospitals in England
