= South Yorkshire Ambulance Service =

Defunct NHS trust in England

- SYAS
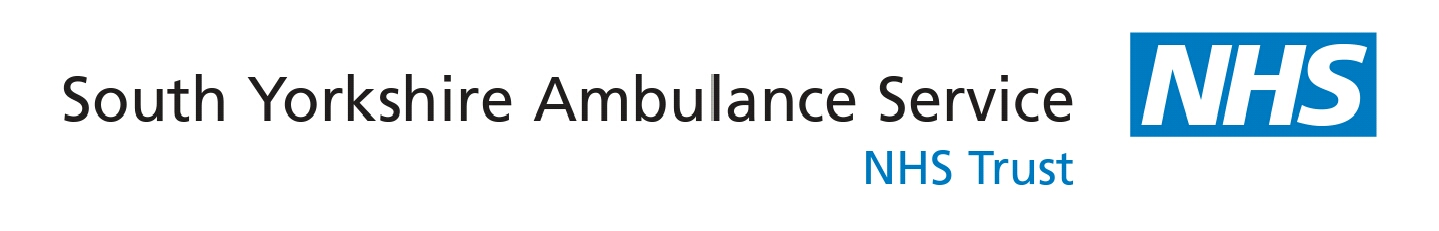
- NHS corporate identity logo for SYAS
- Type: Defunct NHS Ambulance Service
- Established: 1 April 1974
- Disbanded: 1 July 2006
- Headquarters: Moorgate, Rotherham, England
- Region served: County of South Yorkshire
- Area size: 600 square miles
- Population: 1.4 million

South Yorkshire Ambulance Service was the NHS ambulance service covering South Yorkshire, England. On 1 July 2006, it was merged into the new Yorkshire Ambulance Service.

== History ==
South Yorkshire Metropolitan Ambulance Service (SYMAS) was formed in 1974, bringing together the individual town and city services which existed across the county. In 1992, it became an NHS Trust, providing 24-hour emergency and healthcare services to more than 1.4 million people across the region.

Albert Page, who was chief ambulance officer for SYMAS in 1989, testified at the Hillsborough disaster enquiry in 2015 that officers on the ground took too long to declare a major incident, and that they did not communicate with the force control room as they should. The public inquiry concluded that the fans were not to blame and that the inaction of the South Yorkshire Ambulance Service contributed to the number of fatalities.

== See also ==
- Emergency medical services in the United Kingdom
