= Scunthorpe General Hospital =

- Northern Lincolnshire and Goole Hospitals NHS Foundation Trust
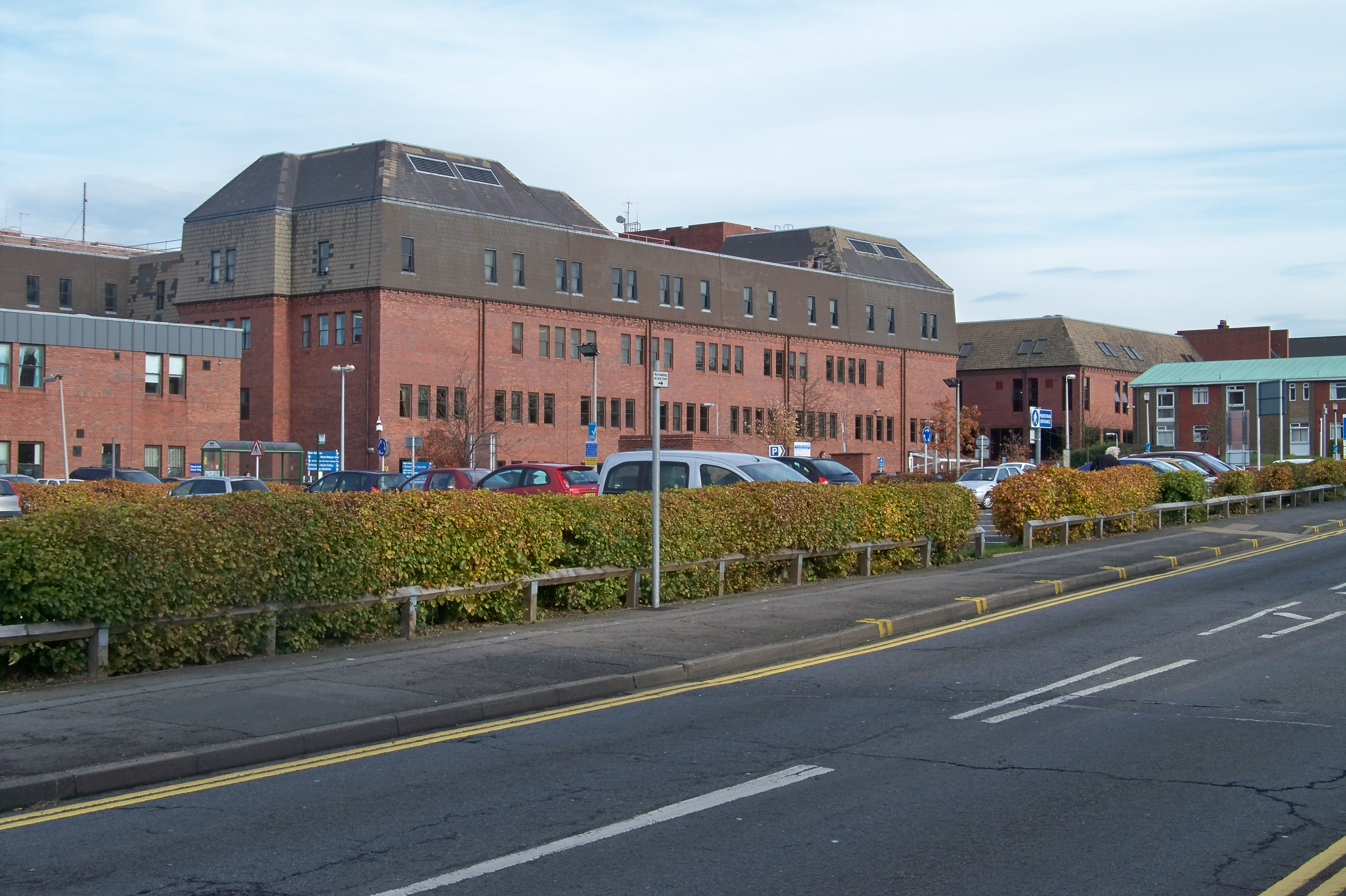

- Shown in Lincolnshire

Geography
- Location: Cliff Gardens, Scunthorpe, North Lincolnshire, DN15 7BH, United Kingdom
- Coordinates: 53.587°N 0.667°W

Organisation
- Care system: Public NHS
- Type: District General
- Affiliated university: NHS North Lincolnshire

Services
- Emergency department: Yes Accident & Emergency
- Beds: 408

History
- Founded: 1929

Links
- Website: NHS Directory
- Lists: Hospitals in the United Kingdom

Scunthorpe General Hospital is the main hospital for North Lincolnshire. It is situated on Church Lane in the west of Scunthorpe, off Kingsway (the A18), and north of the railway.

Until the 1970s, it was known as Scunthorpe and District War Memorial Hospital.

A & E is at the far north of the site on Cliff Gardens, accessed via Highfield Avenue, off Doncaster Road (the A1029). As well as North Lincolnshire, it also serves Gainsborough and Goole. It is managed by Northern Lincolnshire and Goole Hospitals NHS Foundation Trust.

== History ==
=== Background ===
In the 1850s when the steel industry was forming, if there were serious accidents at work, men were taken by horse and cart to the ferry at New Holland and then on to Hull. In the late 1800s makeshift facilities were set up in Frodingham Town Hall.

After the First World War, the need for a hospital became increasingly urgent when the town increased in size after the Appleby-Frodingham Steel Company was formed. Lord St Oswald, who had owned land on which the steelworks were built, donated land off Doncaster Road for a hospital to be built.

=== Formation ===
In the late 1920s, at long last, work gathered pace to build a hospital. Subscriptions from local workmen were collected and local fundraising took place. Each year there was the Annual Hospital Carnival. The Scunthorpe and District War Memorial Hospital opened on 5 December 1929. It cost £65,000 and had 72 beds. For the first year, the running of the hospital cost around £13,000. By 1931 the beds increased to 86 and X-ray equipment was installed. On 26 October 1933 the nurses home was opened by Prince George, Duke of Kent, costing £15,000, with training facilities recognised by the General Nursing Council for England and Wales.

=== Expansion ===
In 1935 it increased to 130 beds, with wards named after Appleby Frodingham, Lysaght's, Redbourn, Firth Brown and Winn – the local steel companies, who were funding half the hospital's costs. In-patients cost 7s 5d per day. Further expansion, including the outpatients, was planned in mid-1939, and completed in 1942, being opened on 15 July 1942 by Ernest Brown, the Minister of Health, and cost £110,000.

=== Post-war ===
On 5 July 1948 Scunthorpe War Memorial Hospital became part of the NHS, administered by Scunthorpe Hospital Management Committee (SHMC), which also controlled Scunthorpe Maternity Home, Brumby Hospital and Glanford Hospital Brigg. Prior to the NHS, most of the funding came from the Appleby-Frodingham Steel Company. The first phase of redevelopment opened in late 1958.

The name was changed to Scunthorpe General Hospital on 1 June 1970. In 1972 a £236,000 contract was given for the second phase of the outpatients department. In June 1974 the hospital had its worst incident (Britain's biggest peacetime explosion) to deal with when the Nypro caprolactam plant at Flixborough exploded. A year later there was a serious accident at the steelworks in November 1975, killing several people. The hospital had to respond to a major incident in May 1982, when a stand holding 800 people at Normanby Hall for It's a Knockout, collapsed seriously injuring 60 people.

New buildings were designed in 1984. A new A & E building started construction in September 1986, to be completed by October 1988.

In July 1987 Clugston Group began the construction of a four storey block, which opened in December 1988. A new four-storey block started construction in November 1988, costing £128m, with five 30-bed acute wards, for general surgery, to open in April 1992. It had 8 new wards, four theatres and a maternity department. It was built at the end of 1991, but there was not enough money to run it until July 1992. On 19 May 1993 this new wing was opened by Queen Elizabeth II, in a tour of south Humberside, known as the Queen's Building.

It became a district general hospital in the early 1990s. All maternity services were to be moved to the hospital from 1991; this would happen in 1992. The Scunthorpe Maternity Hospital, which had opened in 1936, was demolished in 1994.

== Hospital radio ==
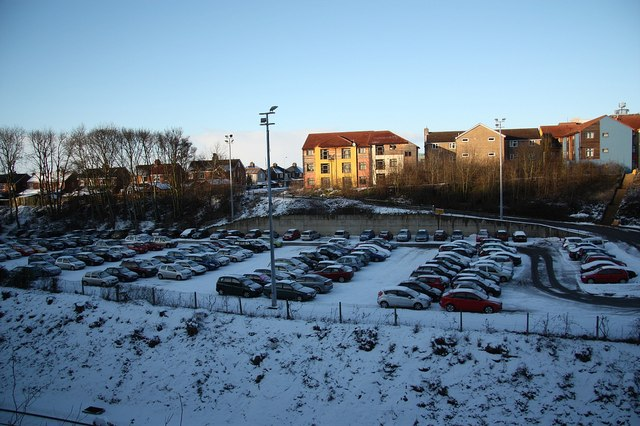
Staff car park seen from the railway, near Brumby Hall

The origin of the current Hospital Radio service was in 1951 when John Tock recorded a commentary on a tape recorder of a football match at the Old Showground between Scunthorpe United and Accrington Stanley. Once the final whistle had sounded, he cycled up to the then War Memorial Hospital and played the tape back on the wards. It was such a success that he continued to do it until eventually live broadcasts began from a dedicated commentary box – direct to the hospital. A music request show followed, initially from a studio at the top of a lift shaft. In 1979 the existing studio building was opened, with an extension including a new studio being added in 2000. This was officially opened by Prince Philip, Duke of Edinburgh on 31 July 2002 during a visit to Scunthorpe for the Golden Jubilee Celebrations.

== See also ==
- List of hospitals in England
