= Diana, Princess of Wales Hospital =

- Northern Lincolnshire and Goole Hospitals NHS Foundation Trust
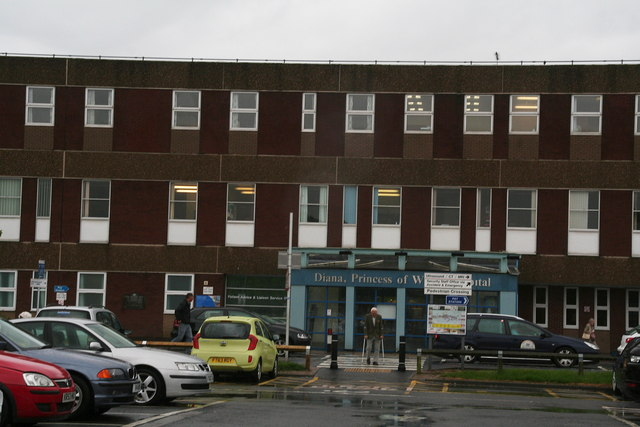
- Diana, Princess of Wales Hospital

- Shown in Lincolnshire

Geography
- Location: Grimsby, Lincolnshire, England
- Coordinates: 53°32′42″N 0°05′43″W

Organisation
- Care system: NHS

History
- Former names: Scartho Road Infirmary; Scartho Road Institution; Scartho Hospital; Grimsby General Hospital
- Founded: 1894

Links
- Website: www.nlg.nhs.uk
- Lists: Hospitals in England

Diana, Princess of Wales Hospital is a public hospital in Grimsby, Lincolnshire, England. It is managed by the Northern Lincolnshire and Goole Hospitals NHS Foundation Trust.

== History ==
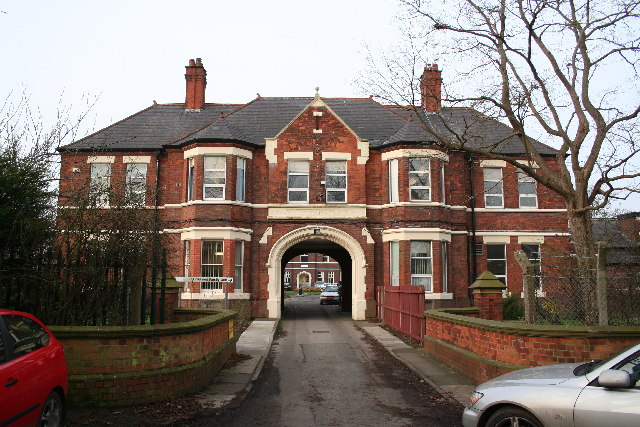
The old hospital in Scartho Road

The hospital has its origins in a workhouse infirmary that opened in Scartho Road in October 1894. The original building and its clock tower were designed by Ernest William Farebrother. The facility has been known by several names since its founding, including Scartho Road Infirmary and Grimsby General Hospital. The facility became a general hospital after the creation of the National Health Service in 1948. The League of Friends of the Grimsby Hospitals was founded in 1956 to help fundraise for hospital improvements not available under the NHS.

In the 1970s, it was decided to build a modern facility on a site to the immediate south of the infirmary. The hospital was officially opened by the Princess of Wales as the Grimsby District Hospital on 26 July 1983 and was renamed in her honour following her death in 1997.

At the forefront of infection control, the Trust was a pioneer of the "clean your hands" campaign in 2003. Subsequent developments included a new Family Services Unit opened in 2004, a new cardiology unit opened in 2005, a new breast care unit opened in 2007 and the first phase of a new Accident and Emergency unit opened in August 2008.

== In popular culture ==
In 1985 the hospital was used for filming scenes of the film Clockwise.

== See also ==
- List of hospitals in England
