= Healthcare transport =

Healthcare transport is the systematic process by which patient- and business-critical materials, such as patient specimens, pharmaceuticals, supplies and medical records are transported to and from multiple touch points within healthcare organizations.

According to a recent article by Dr. Robert Handfield, a true healthcare transport partner supports healthcare organizational business objectives beyond transactional pickups and deliveries to address cost efficiencies, centralization, standardization, error reduction, technology maximization, management reporting for strategic decision-making, system connectivity and analytics for a platform for growth.

The movement of these critical materials directly impacts all healthcare organizations' ability to deliver optimal care.
