= Christian Langton =

British researcher in medical physics (born 1957)

- Born: 6 August 1957 (age 69); Leicester, United Kingdom

Academic background
- Education: University of Hull; University of Aberdeen

Academic work
- Discipline: Medical physics
- Website: staff.qut.edu.au/staff/langtonc/

Christian Langton (born 6 August 1957) is a British researcher in medical physics. He is Adjunct Professor of Medical Physics, Queensland University of Technology, Brisbane, Australia.

== Professional life ==
Langton is notable for his development of an early detection system for osteoporosis using ultrasonic waves.

== Honours and awards ==
Langton was awarded a Doctor of Science (DSc) in Medical Physics from the University of Hull (the first to be awarded in a decade) for his work on the measurement of broadband ultrasonic attenuation in cancellous bone. In 2015 he received an Honorary Doctorate from the University of Eastern Finland. In 2006 Langton's work was listed by EurekaUK as one of the top 100 UK university discoveries to come out of the UK in the past 50 years. In 2008, the UK Department of Health recognised Langton in a publication highlighting eleven projects that had contributed to '60 years of NHS research benefiting patients'. His work is listed under the 'Hull Firsts' at the Carnegie Heritage Centre in Kingston-upon-Hull
