= West Yorkshire Metropolitan Ambulance Service =

NHS ambulance service in Yorkshire

- WYMAS
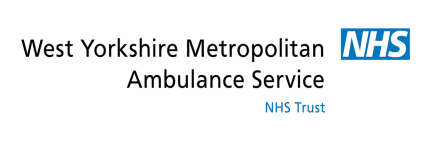
- NHS corporate identity logo for WYMAS

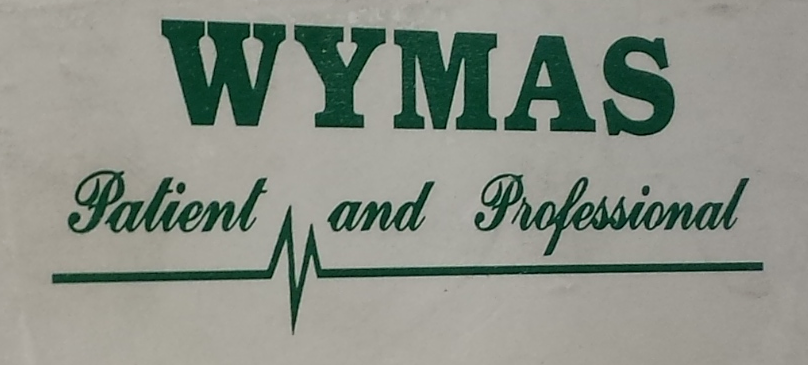
- Non-NHS corporate identity logo for WYMAS

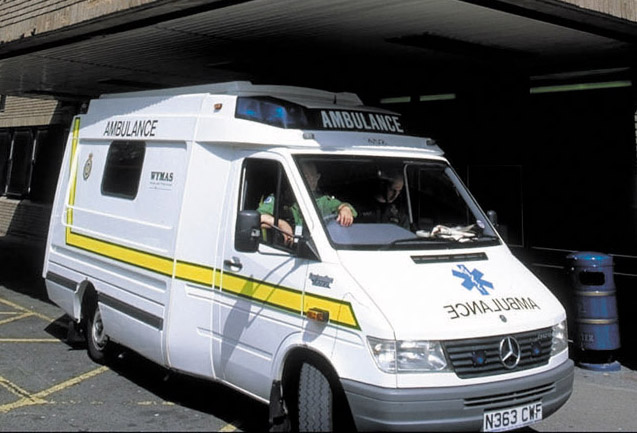
- A WYMAS ambulance outside a hospital in Leeds
- Type: Defunct NHS Ambulance Service
- Established: 1 April 1974
- Disbanded: 1 July 2006
- Headquarters: Birkenshaw and then Wakefield, England
- Region served: County of West Yorkshire and the Craven area of North Yorkshire

West Yorkshire Metropolitan Ambulance Service (WYMAS) was the NHS ambulance service covering West Yorkshire and the western side of North Yorkshire, England. On 1 July 2006, it was merged to the single Yorkshire Ambulance Service.

== History ==
West Yorkshire Metropolitan Ambulance Service was formed in 1974, bringing together the individual city services which existed across the county. In 1992, it became an NHS Trust, providing 24-hour emergency and healthcare services to more than 2.1 million people across the region.

== Geography ==
WYMAS covered the whole of West Yorkshire, including the cities of Bradford, Leeds, and Wakefield, and the towns of Halifax, Huddersfield and Pontefract. In addition, WYMAS's coverage extended into the Craven area of North Yorkshire with ambulance stations at Grassington, Ingleton, Settle and Skipton, covering the western side of North Yorkshire and the Yorkshire Dales. The region included parts of the M1, A1(M), M62, M621 and M606 motorways.

Neighbouring ambulance services covered Greater Manchester, Lancashire, North Yorkshire and South Yorkshire.

There were 21 ambulance stations situated across the WYMAS operating area.

== Services ==
WYMAS activities were centred on two core activities: Accident & Emergency (A&E) and patient transport services (PTS). The service operated from a communication centre located at the Service's headquarters at Birkenshaw, south of Bradford.

== See also ==
- Emergency medical services in the United Kingdom
