= Northern Lincolnshire and Goole Hospitals NHS Foundation Trust =

NHS hospital trust

- Type: NHS hospital trust
- Budget: £317 million
- Hospitals: Diana, Princess of Wales Hospital; Scunthorpe General Hospital; Goole and District Hospital
- Chair: Terry Moran
- Chief executive: Peter Reading
- Website: www.nlg.nhs.uk

Northern Lincolnshire and Goole Hospitals NHS Foundation Trust is an NHS Foundation Trust which was established in April 2001, by a merger of North East Lincolnshire NHS Trust and Scunthorpe and Goole Hospitals NHS Trust. It runs the Diana, Princess of Wales Hospital in Grimsby, Scunthorpe General Hospital, both in Lincolnshire, and Goole and District Hospital, in the East Riding of Yorkshire, England.

The trust established the Path Links Pathology Service jointly with United Lincolnshire Hospitals NHS Trust in 2001.

In January 2016 the trust was one of five where substantial reconfiguration of services was envisaged.

== Performance ==
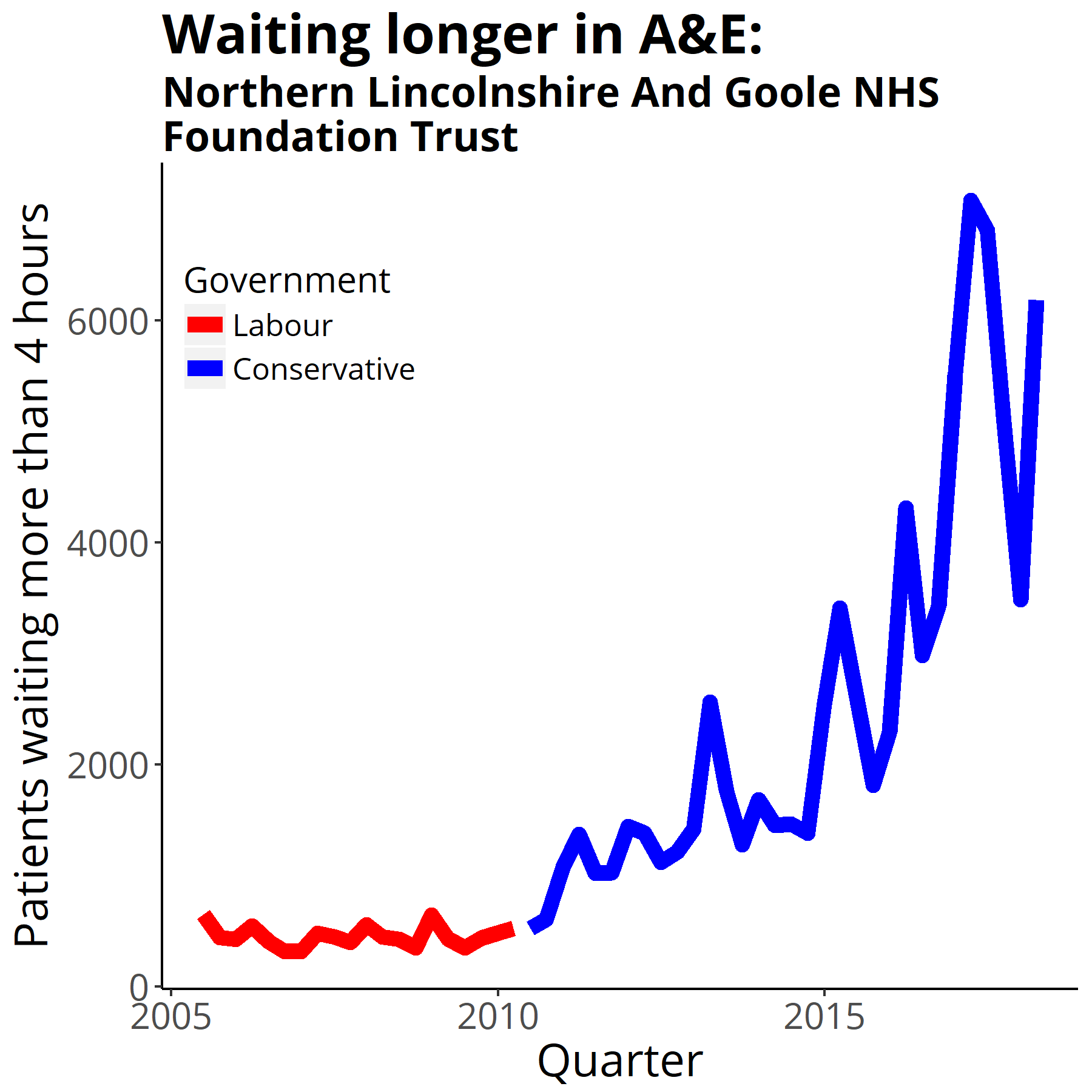
Four-hour target in the emergency department quarterly figures from NHS England Data from https://www.england.nhs.uk/statistics/statistical-work-areas/ae-waiting-times-and-activity/

It was one of 11 trusts to be placed into special measures after the Keogh Review into higher than expected mortality rates. It was assigned to Sheffield Teaching Hospitals NHS Foundation Trust for support and though it was said to be making good progress it was one of the 24 trusts placed in the highest risk band by the Care Quality Commission in October 2013.

In December 2013 the Trust was one of thirteen hospital trusts named by Dr Foster Intelligence as having higher than expected higher mortality indicator scores for the period April 2012 to March 2013 in their Hospital Guide 2013.

It was taken out of special measures in July 2014.

In April 2015 the trust asked for an emergency loan from the Department of Health as it forecast an £18 million year end deficit for 2014-15. It expects a deficit of £25.8 million for 2015/6.

Scunthorpe General Hospital was judged by the Care Quality Commission to be "inadequate" in April 2016. They found "evidence of harm to patients within the outpatient services because of poor management of the follow up appointment system". The trust complained about this assessment. Diana, Princess of Wales Hospital in Grimsby was rated as "requires improvement", while Goole and District Hospital was rated "good".

The trust was hit by a Ransomware virus, Globe2, on 30 October 2016. Computer systems were shut down and 2,800 appointments were cancelled over the following two days.

In May 2017 it announced an external contract for ophthalmology work to help clear a backlog of almost 900 patients. It was again put into special measures after the Care Quality Commission found that there "remained a lack of management oversight of the recurrent backlogs".

In January 2020 it had a backlog of 34,938 follow-up appointments of which 20% were in ophthalmology. The ophthalmology service could not meet the quality standards set by NICE regarding "the frequency of recall to follow-up, as well as the tests which need to be performed every visit due to limitation of clinical capacity, technical instrumentation and training technicians".

== See also ==
- List of NHS trusts
