= John Lee (pathologist) =

English pathologist

John Andre Lee (born 1961) is a retired English pathologist who was formerly clinical professor of pathology at Hull York Medical School and consultant histopathologist at Rotherham General Hospital, later becoming the Rotherham NHS Foundation Trust's Director of Cancer Services. Lee gained a BSc and a PhD in physiology at University College London, and then a medical degree subsequently specialising in pathology.

== Anatomy for Beginners ==
Lee became known to a wider public after participating in a public autopsy in November 2002 with Gunther von Hagens, creator of the Body Worlds exhibition. This led to three television series as co-presenter with von Hagens, Anatomy for Beginners (screened in the UK on Channel 4 in 2005), Autopsy: Life and Death (Channel 4, 2006) and Autopsy: Emergency Room (Channel 4, 2007).

In the first series, various aspects of human anatomy were explored, with von Hagens dissecting cadavers to illustrate certain points. In the later series particular diseases were highlighted and explained, again with dissections of cadavers, allowing direct observation of the symptoms in humans.

During these programmes, Lee provided the background information about, and elucidation regarding, von Hagens' ongoing dissections. In essence, he was used to 'cut away' whilst the less telegenic parts of the dissection proceeded. This background information was usually shown on a television monitor and ensured that the audience could follow the doctors as they worked. Further anatomical and medical information was demonstrated on live models (nude persons with the relevant internal organs drawn and/or projected on to their body).

== COVID-19 pandemic ==
In 2020, shortly after his retirement, Lee wrote several prominent articles in The Spectator magazine critical of the UK Government's approach to the COVID-19 coronavirus outbreak.

== Other activities ==
Lee is a public patron of Humanists UK.

On 15 September 2010, Lee, along with 54 other public figures, signed an open letter published in The Guardian, stating their opposition to Pope Benedict XVI's state visit to the UK.
