= Anatomy for Beginners =

British television series

Anatomy for Beginners is a television show created by Gunther von Hagens.

In this 4-part series, von Hagens and Professor John Lee demonstrated the anatomical structure and workings of the body. The 4 episodes (Movement, Circulation, Digestion, and Reproduction) were screened in the United Kingdom on Channel 4 in 2005.

The show features public anatomy demonstrations with the use of real human cadavers and live nude models (for surface anatomy and surface markings), carried out at von Hagens' Institute for Plastination in Heidelberg, Germany.

Von Hagens’ public demonstrations are not formal anatomy dissections performed by medical students in some countries as part of their medical training. Actual formal dissections are performed slowly and take dozens of hours of dissection. Anatomy for Beginners performs quicker autopsy procedures, and also combines demonstrations of plastinated body parts and specimens to give a glimpse of human anatomy.

The individuals on whom the demonstrations were performed had, before their death, enrolled in von Hagens’ body donor programme and consented to the use of their bodies for public education in anatomy, including public demonstration.

== See also ==
- Body Worlds
