= Dalian Medical University =

- 大连医科大学
- No. 9 West Section of South Lvshun Road, Lüshunkou District, Dalian, Liaoning Province, China

Information
- School type: Public University
- Motto: 甚解 敏行 明仁 济世 (Understanding, Cultivation of morality, Benevolent heart, Doing good to society)
- Established: 1947
- School district: Liaoning, China
- Principal: Yinghui Xu (徐英辉)
- Faculty: 4,300
- Enrolment: 13,300
- Language: Chinese (Simplified Chinese, Mandarin), English (in English lessons only)
- Website: http://www.dlmedu.edu.cn/

Dalian Medical University (Chinese: 大连医科大学; pinyin: Dàlián Yīkē Dàxué) is a university in Dalian, Liaoning, China, under the provincial government. It was founded in 1947.

In October 2007, it moved to the new campus in Lushunkou District, Dalian, which is across Lushun South Road from Dalian University of Foreign Languages' new campus.

The school through its Dalian Medical University Plastination Co. subsidiary is the source of the cadavers which have undergone plastination to appear worldwide in the Bodies: The Exhibition.

The school currently has 1 national key discipline, 4 first-class construction disciplines in Liaoning Province, and 4 first-class characteristic disciplines in Liaoning Province. 2 disciplines enter the top 1% of ESI global institutions. There are 4 post-doctoral research stations, 4 first-level discipline doctorate authorization points, 1 professional doctorate authorization point; 11 first-level discipline authorization authorization points, and 6 professional temporary authorization points. One was awarded by the Ministry of Education's innovation team, and two of them were selected as young leaders in science and technology innovation in the Ministry of Science and Technology Innovation Talent Promotion Plan. The school has now developed to be medically focused, it is a key construction university of a first-class university in Liaoning Province.

== Affiliated hospitals ==
- The First Affiliated Hospital of Dalian Medical University
- The Second Affiliated Hospital of Dalian Medical University
- The Third Hospital of Dalian Medical University
