= Edward James Shearman =

British surgeon (1798–1878)

Dr Edward James Shearman FRCP FRCS FRSE (1798–2 October 1878) was a 19th-century British surgeon and author. He founded Rotherham Hospital in 1872 (now known as Doncaster Gate Hospital). In authorship he often appears as E. J. Shearman.

== Life ==
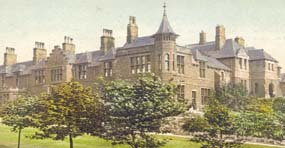
an early image of the Hospital

He was born in 1798 in Wington in Somerset.

He studied medicine at the University of Edinburgh graduating with an MB ChB around 1818. He then did practical experience in St George's Hospital in London before postgraduate studies in Jena in south-east Germany where he received his doctorate (MD). His earlier career is unclear but from 1841 he was a surgeon the Rotherham Dispensary and a General practitioner in that town.

In 1870 he was elected a Fellow of the Royal Society of Edinburgh, his proposer being Arthur Abney Walker.

In 1872, whilst on the Rotherham Board of Health, he founded Rotherham Hospital and ran the hospital until his death.

He died at Moorgsate in Rotherham on 2 October 1878 aged 80.

== Publications ==
- Remarkable Case of Rigidity of the Uteri (1834)
- Case of Asphyxia from Hanging (1844)
- Malformation of the Heart (1845)
- Case of Punctured Wound of the Abdomen (1845)
- Living Animalcules in Human Urine (1846)
- Changes in Urine Effected by Disease (1846)
- An Essay on the Properties of Animal and Vegetable Life (1846)
- Diseases of the Chest (1848)
- On Dr Ayre's Treatment of Cholera (1854)
- Two Cases of Albuminuria in the Same House (1874)
- A Series of Cases of Haematuria (1875)
- Description of the Rotherham Hospital (1877)
