= Bodies: The Exhibition =

Exhibition of preserved human bodies

Promotional poster.

Bodies: The Exhibition is an exhibition showcasing human bodies that have been preserved through a process called plastination and dissected to display bodily systems. It opened in Tampa, Florida on August 20, 2005. It is similar to, though not affiliated with, the exhibition Body Worlds (which opened in 1995). The exhibit displays internal organs and organic systems, bodies staged in active poses, and fetuses in various stages of development.

The show is operated by Premier Exhibitions which presents and promotes similar exhibits including "Bodies Revealed", and "Our Body: The Universe Within", and other entertainment exhibits. The Exhibition showcases 13 whole-body specimens and more than 260 organs and partial body specimens. These real human bodies have been meticulously dissected, preserved through an innovative process.

Concerns have been raised by human rights advocates that the bodies are those of executed Chinese prisoners, and that the families of the victims have not consented. The exhibition has claimed that the presumed origin of the bodies and fetuses "relies solely on the representations of its Chinese partners" and that they "cannot independently verify" that the bodies do not belong to executed prisoners. Catholics also had high levels of concern about allowing children to view displays containing human remains.

== Exhibit organization ==
The exhibit is set up so that one starts at the skeletal system, and more layers (muscular, nervous, circulatory, digestive, respiratory, urinary, and reproductive systems; as well as fetal development and the treated body) are added in successive rooms. Containing about twenty bodies in total, each exhibition uses real human bodies that have been preserved permanently by a process called "polymer preservation" (commonly referred to as "plastination") so that they will not decay. This exhibition is organized by the publicly traded corporation, Premier Exhibitions Incorporated, which also staged Bodies Revealed first in Seoul, South Korea and more recently in the US. The company received the cadavers for research from the Chinese government, who donated them because all the bodies, at the time of death, had no close next of kin or immediate families and remained unclaimed. The dissections took place at the Dalian University in Liaoning, China and the resulting specimens were leased to Premier Exhibitions for the five-year duration of the show.

Some of the specimens are arranged so that they are performing activities such as playing poker or conducting an orchestra. Along the way are other displays showing a human intestine stretched out, the polluted lung of an adult smoker, and all of the arteries and veins without the body itself. The exhibit of the polluted lung of the smoker also includes a clear standing box in which guests can discard their cigarettes and tobacco products after viewing the display. In the Las Vegas exhibit, there was also a polluted lung of a fetus on display. One section includes several fetuses in various stages of development. All of the fetuses died due to miscarriages, and the disorders which caused each are highlighted on most of the displays. Guests are notified by a small sign at the exhibit of the sensitivity of the fetus gallery just before entrance into the area, and given the option to skip that room if so desired.

== Preservation of the bodies and organs ==
The bodies are prevented from decaying by means of plastination, a rubberization process patented in the 1970s by anatomist Gunther von Hagens. The essence of the process is the replacement of water and fatty material in the cells of the body first by acetone and then by plastics, such as silicone rubber, polyester or epoxy resin. The original method and chemical concoction von Hagens developed for plastination is under copyright, as such Bodies uses a distinct imitation.

== Ethical concerns ==
Concerns have been raised about the provenance of the bodies and the ethics of viewing human remains (particularly by Catholics), for children. In an editorial, Lutheran Reverend Christoph Reiners questioned the effect on the values of children. Prior to the 2005 U.S. premiere, the Florida Attorney General expressed the opinion that the State Anatomical Board's approval should be required. The Board fought the Tampa exhibit, with its director expressing the opinion that the exhibit should be shut down. Premier Exhibitions officials disagreed, claiming that the Board had jurisdiction only over medical schools and not museums; the exhibit opened two days ahead of schedule at the Tampa Museum of Science and Industry.

From 2006, The New York Times and the 20/20 television program have published reports on a "black market" in Chinese cadavers and organs, sparking a Congressional inquiry, an investigation by then-New York Attorney General Andrew Cuomo, and the resignation of Premier's CEO Arnie Geller. As the result of the Cuomo investigation and subsequent settlement in 2008, the front page of the exhibition website displays a disclaimer about the presumed origin of the bodies and fetuses, saying that it "relies solely on the representations of its Chinese partners" and "cannot independently verify" that the bodies do not belong to executed prisoners. Both the human rights activist Harry Wu and the director of the Human Rights in China advocacy group have objected to the exhibit on these grounds.

A science education coordinator for the Carnegie Museum of Science resigned her position over the exhibit, citing her religious beliefs, questions about provenance, and a general repugnance for putting "human remains" on exhibit. Professor Anita Allen, a University of Pennsylvania bioethicist, argued that spending money to "gawk" at human remains should raise serious concerns. Thomas Hibbs, Baylor University ethicist, compares cadaver displays to pornography in that they reduce the subject to "the manipulation of body parts stripped of any larger human significance". Even if consent were to be obtained, Rabbi Danny Schiff maintains that we should still question what providing "bodies arranged in showcases for a hungry public" says about a society.

In 2017 in Czech Republic, during the time of the exhibition Body The Exhibition taking place in Prague at the Exhibition Grounds in Holešovice, four doctors and four non-profit organizations issued a statement about the ethical and human rights concerns. The statement called upon the organizers to present a consent of the donors of the displayed bodies, if such a document exists. It also expressed concerns about the possibility that the bodies may come from prisoners of conscience in China. The local police in Prague rejected a suggested ban of the exhibition and a burial of the bodies as proposed by Prague 7 district mayor Jan Čižinský, who also appealed at the Chinese Embassy, asking to bury the bodies.

== See also ==
- Body Worlds
- Embalming
- Mummification
- Plastination
