= Premier Exhibitions =

American company

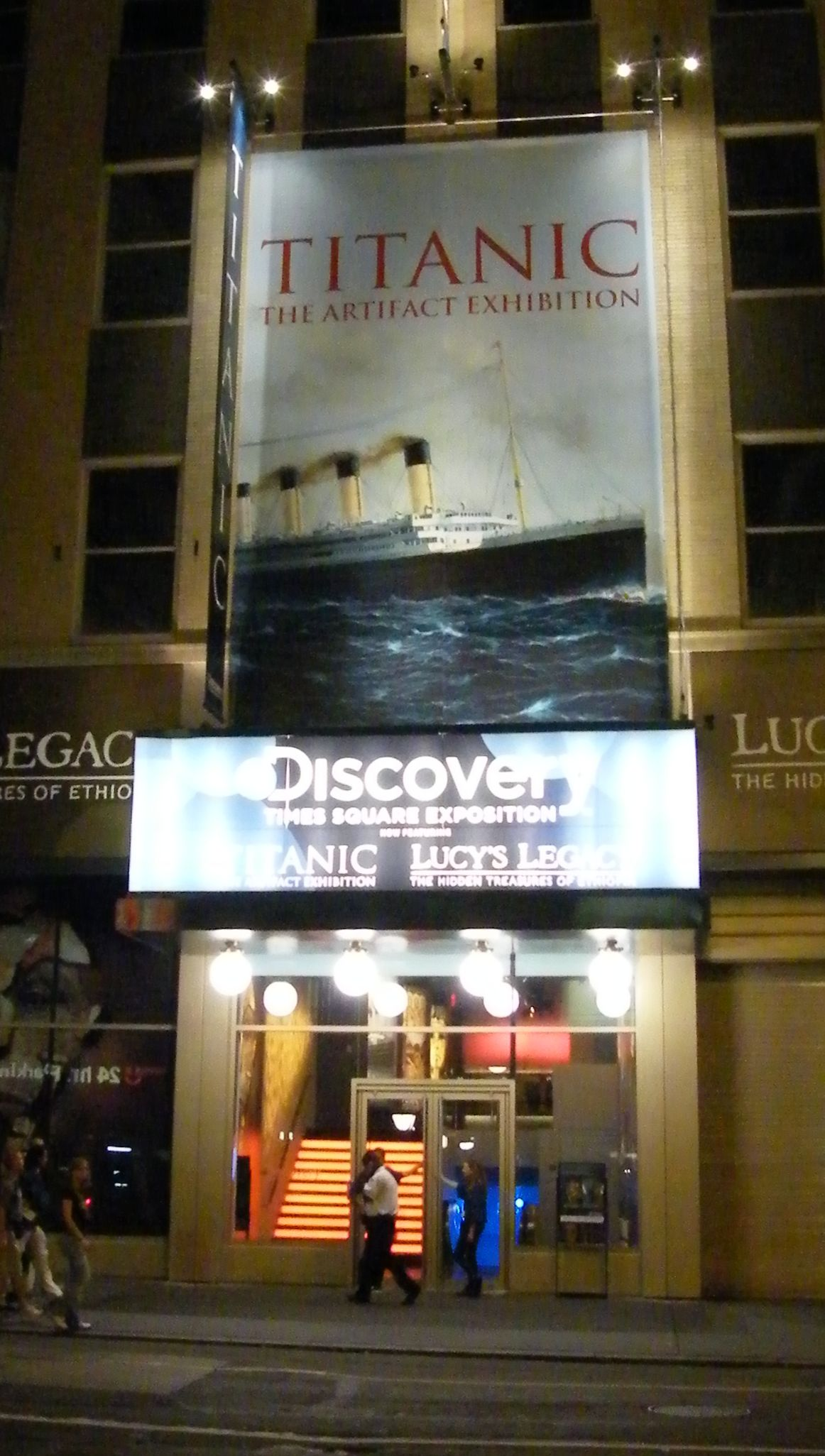
Poster for its Titanic exhibition at the Discovery Times Square Exposition in 2009.

Premier Exhibitions Inc (Expert Market: PRXIQ) is an Atlanta, Georgia-based company that organizes traveling exhibitions. As of January 2019, the company owned 5,500 Titanic relics with approximately 1,300 on display in various countries.

Its two most prominent exhibits are artifacts from the RMS Titanic and Bodies: The Exhibition in which it displays cadavers arranged in lifelike poses via plastination from the Dalian Medical University (through its Dalian Medical University Plastination Company subsidiary) in China. It has multiple exhibits of both Bodies and Titanic running at the same time in different venues. In 2008, it entered into a 10-year lease for more than 36,000 square feet (3,300 m^{2}) at the Luxor Las Vegas for exhibits of Titanic and Bodies there. By 2013, more than 25 million people had visited the company's Titanic exhibits in Orlando, Atlanta, Los Angeles, Las Vegas, and elsewhere.

In May 2015 the company opened Premier on 5th, a flagship exhibition space on Fifth Avenue in New York City that housed "Saturday Night Live: The Exhibition" and "The Discovery of King Tut." On June 14, 2016, Premier Exhibitions filed for Chapter 11 bankruptcy.

In late August 2018, at least three groups competed for the right to purchase the 5,500 Titanic relics that were an asset of the bankrupt company in the case titled RMS Titanic Inc., 16-02230, U.S. Bankruptcy Court, Middle District of Florida (Jacksonville). Two of the offers for the collection were just under US$20 million, including one by museums in England and Northern Ireland, with assistance by James Cameron. The decision had to be approved by Paul M. Glenn, a United States district court judge in Jacksonville, Florida. The collection and salvage rights were sold to a consortium of investors led by Apollo Global Management, Alta Fundamental Advisers and PacBridge Capital Partners for $19.5 million.

== History ==
=== RMS Titanic Inc. ===
The first Titanic expedition began in July 1987 and was financed by Titanic Ventures Limited Partnership, Oceanic Research & Exploration. These co-partners led a $6 million expedition to the ship, and recovered artifacts 12,850 feet (3.92 km) beneath the surface of the North Atlantic. Co-founder and RMS Titanic Chairman Tulloch (1944–2004), owner of the largest BMW dealership in the U.S., led five of the expeditions. In order to recover artifacts, the expedition team completed 32 dives to Titanic in the Nautile, a deep-diving submersible chartered by Oceanic Research and Exploration in a partnership with the French Research Institute IFREMER. This is the greatest number of deep-sea dives ever completed for any televised project. The company had an OTC ticker symbol of SOST. In 1994 it won a Virginia court order to get salvor-in-possession rights to the ship.

In 1998, the company reported net income of $4 million on almost $10 million in revenues. The following year, revenue dropped to $6.4 million, resulting in a slight loss.

When Tulloch died in 2004, he was lauded by the Titanic International Society, whose president said of him, "He has done more to preserve the memory of Titanic than anyone else". In 1992, the company, through a reverse merger, formed itself as RMS Titanic Inc. Tulloch co-led operations on the Titanic in 1993, 1994, 1996, and 1998 along with Paul-Henri Nargeolet who led the IFREMER dive team.

G. Michael Harris opened the first permanent Titanic exhibition on April 10, 1999; in Orlando, though it did not feature artifacts recovered from the wreck. It was claimed to be the largest Titanic exhibition in the world, located in Orlando, Florida; he sold it to Premier Exhibitions in 2012. Harris was the expedition leader in the summer of 2000 with over 120 hours on the wreck of Titanic and made eleven dives in the Russian Deep Diving Mir submersibles MIR1 and MIR2. The 2000 expedition included the last crewed salvage dives to the Titanic, but was the most successful from an artifact recovery operations standpoint. Harris also found some perfume bottles from the Titanic on August 2, 2000, in the Mir2 Russian submersible along with his Director of Operations, David Walker.

The television documentary Return to the Titanic….LIVE, hosted by Telly Savalas, was shown in 27 countries in 1987. A feature was the supposed live opening of the assistant purser's safe on television.

RMS Titanic and Premier continued to be involved in litigation over the matter.

Opened on October 21, 2023, Titanic: The Exhibition is a museum in National Harbor, Maryland, which features sculptures, models, and artifacts recovered from the wreck of the RMS Titanic. The museum is owned by RMS Titanic Inc in the United States.

=== 1999 takeover ===
In 1999, investors from SFX Entertainment, along with co-founder G. Michael Harris and Arnie Geller, led a surreptitious takeover, ousting George Tulloch and the company's attorney, the day after Thanksgiving. Geller was installed as president and CEO of the company and Harris was installed as Chief Operating Officer as well as Secretary of RMS Titanic, Inc. They fired all other officers and directors and were the only two remaining directors. John Joslyn was a small shareholder and took part in the takeover of the company in 1999. Tulloch sued and was awarded $2.5 million in damages. Geller and Harris were later found, in a complaint by the SEC, to have violated multiple Exchange Act rules as part of the takeover, and Geller was ordered to pay a civil penalty of $85,000. In a later complaint filed by the SEC, the judgement found that other insurgent shareholders, including Joslyn, had violated multiple Exchange Act rules, and were ordered to pay civil fines. John Joslyn was ordered to pay a $75,000; Joseph Marsh was ordered to pay $75,000; David Lucas was ordered to pay $30,000; Steven Sybesma was ordered to pay $30,000; and Jon Thompson was ordered to pay $15,000.

The abrupt takeover alarmed the governments of the UK, France, Canada, and the U.S., especially when one of the insurgent investors was quoted as saying the new management was intent on cutting into Titanic's hull to recover more treasures and gain increased profits. Chief Operating Officer Harris was later fired in August 2000. The company claimed Harris misappropriated company funds. Harris later filed for bankruptcy for inability to pay his debts.

=== Bodies: The Exhibition ===
In October 2004, the company changed its name to Premier Exhibitions and changed its ticker symbol to initially to PXHB on the OTC, after it branched out with Bodies: The Exhibition after it acquired The Universe Within Touring Company, LLC.

Bodies: The Exhibition became the primary money maker for the firm with 19 separate human anatomy exhibitions at 33 venues while the Titanic was on exhibit at 15 locations in 2009. In 2009 the company reported that 19% of its revenue came from Titanic and 67% from Bodies: The Exhibition with the rest among its other exhibitions.

Bodies: The Exhibition has generated considerable controversy over its appropriateness and questioning the practice of selling cadavers for public display without family permission. In 2014, the human-rights group Choose Humanity alleged that some of the cadavers used for Bodies: The Exhibition were those of executed Chinese prisoners. A disclaimer on Premier Exhibition's website stated, "The Chinese Bureau of Police may receive bodies from Chinese prisons. Premier cannot independently verify that the human remains you are viewing are not those of persons who were incarcerated in Chinese prisons.” Friends of Falun Gong believe that many of the executed Chinese prisoners used for multiple venues of Bodies: The Exhibition were that of Falun Gong practitioners, a group that faces on-going persecution by the Chinese Communist Party.

The company changed its ticker symbol again to PRXI when it was listed on NASDAQ. The new ticker symbol is PRXIQ.

=== 2008 ===
On November 6, 2008, Mark Sellers, a 16% share holder in Premier Exhibitions Inc., issued a press release demanding the resignation of Premier's CEO Arnie Geller, lambasting him for taking $1.2 million in compensation even as the shareholders saw their investment values plunge, with the stocks price dropping from $17 a share to under $2 a share. When Geller refused, a proxy battle erupted with Sellers’ firm nominating its own slate of directors in what amounted to a hostile takeover. By January 2009, Sellers decisively won the battle, was appointed as unpaid, non-executive chairman and fired Geller.

=== 2009–2013 ===
In 2009, its other exhibits include "Dialog in the Dark" in which visitors pass through an exhibit totally without light and "Star Trek: The Exhibition". By 2013, more than 25 million people had visited the company's Titanic exhibits in Orlando, Atlanta, Los Angeles, Las Vegas, and elsewhere, said the company.

=== 2016 ===
After facing legal challenges and the early closure of its "Saturday Night Live" exhibition, Premier filed for bankruptcy protection in June 2016.

=== 2018–present ===
As of 2020, RMS Titanic Inc. continues to be the wreck's legal salvager. Starting in 2009, they changed their approach to that of closer co-operation with Titanic preservation and regulatory bodies.

In the fall of 2018, the 5,500 artifacts from the Titanic were all for sale after the bankruptcy filing of Premier Exhibitions in the United States. The National Maritime Museum, National Museums Northern Ireland, Titanic Belfast and Titanic Foundation Limited had joined as a consortium that raised money to purchase the artifacts. They intended to keep all of the items together as a single exhibit. The museums were critical of the bid process set by the bankruptcy court, which set the minimum bid at $21.5 million (£16.5m). The consortium bid of $19.2 million fell short of that amount by October 11, 2018, deadline.

Instead, the collection and salvage rights were sold to a consortium of investors led by Apollo Global Management, Alta Fundamental Advisers and PacBridge Capital Partners for $19.5 million. At the time of the purchase, the consortium agreed that any new exploration or salvage expedition must receive approval from NOAA and the court. Further, the purchase price gives Premier's unsecured creditors an 80% recovery.

A critical opinion piece published in June 2020 accused Premier Exhibitions, and specifically its subsidiary R.M.S. Titanic Inc, of foul play over the auction of the artifacts, suggesting they declared bankruptcy to get around its commitment to keep the collections together and on public display. The piece described the company as "bandits" and "not fit for purpose".

A further controversy arose in 2020, when RMS Titanic Inc. announced plans to retrieve Titanic's wireless radio and exhibit it. The U.S. government challenged the plan in a filing with the 4th U.S. Circuit Court of Appeals in June, contending that any such expedition, which might "physically alter or disturb" the deteriorating wreck, requires authorization from the U.S. Department of Commerce and would breach an agreement with the UK that regulates entry into the hull.

On October 11, 2023, RMS Titanic Inc. announced, via a court filing, that at this time further artifact recovery would not be appropriate. They also indicated they would not be launching another mission to the Titanic site pending further investigations into the Titan submersible implosion.

An imaging expedition was planned for May 2024. It was carried out in July. The expedition utilized high definition imaging technology and ROV's (remotely operated vehicles) to capture detailed images of the wreck site and debris field.
