= Rotherham NHS Foundation Trust =

NHS foundation trust in South Yorkshire, England

- Type: NHS hospital trust
- Hospitals: Rotherham General Hospital
- Chair: Martin Havenhand
- Chief executive: Richard Jenkins (interim)
- Website: www.therotherhamft.nhs.uk

The Rotherham NHS Foundation Trust operates Rotherham General Hospital in South Yorkshire, England. It was previously Rotherham General Hospitals NHS Trust before becoming an NHS Foundation Trust in 2005.

The Trust was featured in Can Gerry Robinson Fix the NHS? an Open University BBC series shown on BBC2 from 8 January 2007 to 10 January 2007.

In October 2012 the Trust announced that it needed a "smaller hospital, with substantially fewer beds".

In October 2013 its future independence was under consideration. The Trust recorded a deficit of £3.5 million in 2012–13 but predicted a surplus of £3.3 million in 2013–14.

The Trust was one of the first to abandon the National Programme for Information Technology (NPfIT) electronic patient records system in 2009 and adopt the MEDITECH system. The system has been live since 2012 and is the Trust's main acute EPR system with SystmOne in use in the Community setting.

== Performance ==
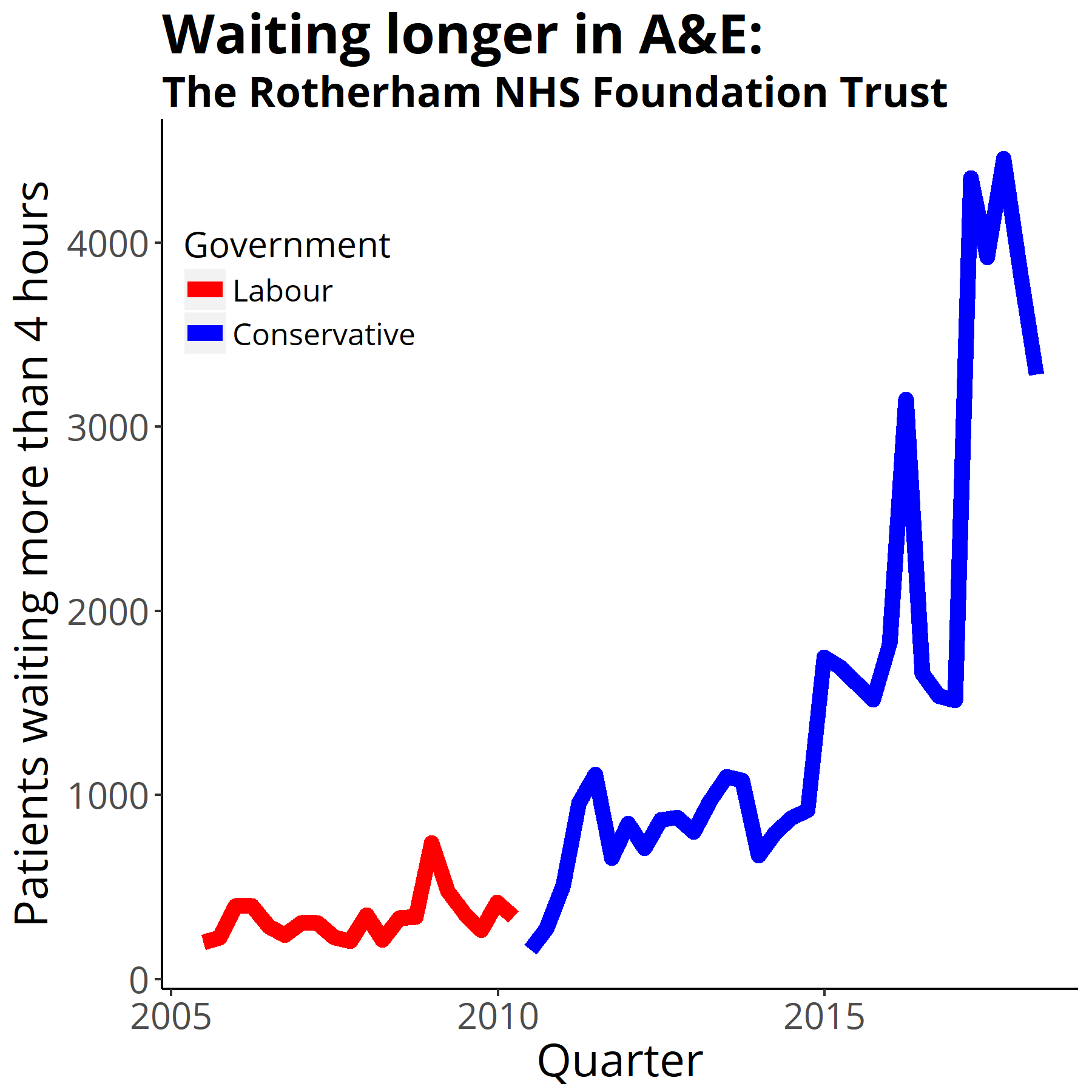
Four-hour target in the emergency department quarterly figures from NHS England Data from https://www.england.nhs.uk/statistics/statistical-work-areas/ae-waiting-times-and-activity/

In 2015 the Trust declared a serious incident after discovering a patient had waited 66 weeks for an operation. They discovered five more people who had also waited more than a year for treatment. 93.4% of patients at the trust referred for day-case or inpatient treatment received it within 18 weeks in January 2015, within the target of treating 90% of non-urgent cases in 18 weeks.

The trust spent £13.2 million on agency staff in 2014/5. The trust was among the three worst nationally over care for women giving birth.

In the most recent Care Quality Commission inspection report, published on 31 January 2019, the trust was rated overall as requiring improvement.

== Integrated Community Services ==
From 1 April 2011, a number of services previously provided by Rotherham Community Health Services and Doncaster Dental Care merged with The Rotherham NHS Foundation Trust creating a combined acute and community provider organisation.

== See also ==
- List of NHS trusts
