= Doncaster Gate Hospital =

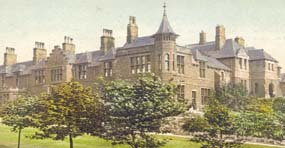
- Doncaster Gate Hospital

- Shown in South Yorkshire

Geography
- Location: Rotherham, South Yorkshire, England
- Coordinates: 53.430°N 1.352°W

Organisation
- Care system: NHS
- Type: District general

Services
- Emergency department: Yes

History
- Founded: 1806
- Closed: 1984

Links
- Lists: Hospitals in England

Doncaster Gate Hospital was a hospital located in Rotherham in South Yorkshire, England.

== History ==
The hospital has its origins in the Rotherham Public Dispensary established at Wellgate in Rotherham in 1806. It moved to College Square in Rotherham in 1828.

Following an initiative by Dr Edward Shearman, funding was sought for a new hospital in the town. Subscriptions were donated by every section of the community from ladies living on Moorgate to the workers in the surrounding factories. It was decided to situate the new building in Doncaster Gate, so-named because it marked the gateway to Rotherham on the Doncaster Road.

The architects, Mallison & Bakewell of Dewsbury and Leeds, were selected from over 90 entries in a competition run by The Builder magazine in 1869. The hospital, which was built partly in Tudor style and partly in Gothic style at a cost of £9,000, opened in 1872.

It joined the National Health Service as Doncaster Gate Hospital in 1948. After services, including the special care baby unit, had been transferred to Rotherham General Hospital, Doncaster Gate Hospital closed in 1984.

== See also ==
- List of hospitals in England
