= Body Worlds =

Exhibition of plastinated bodies

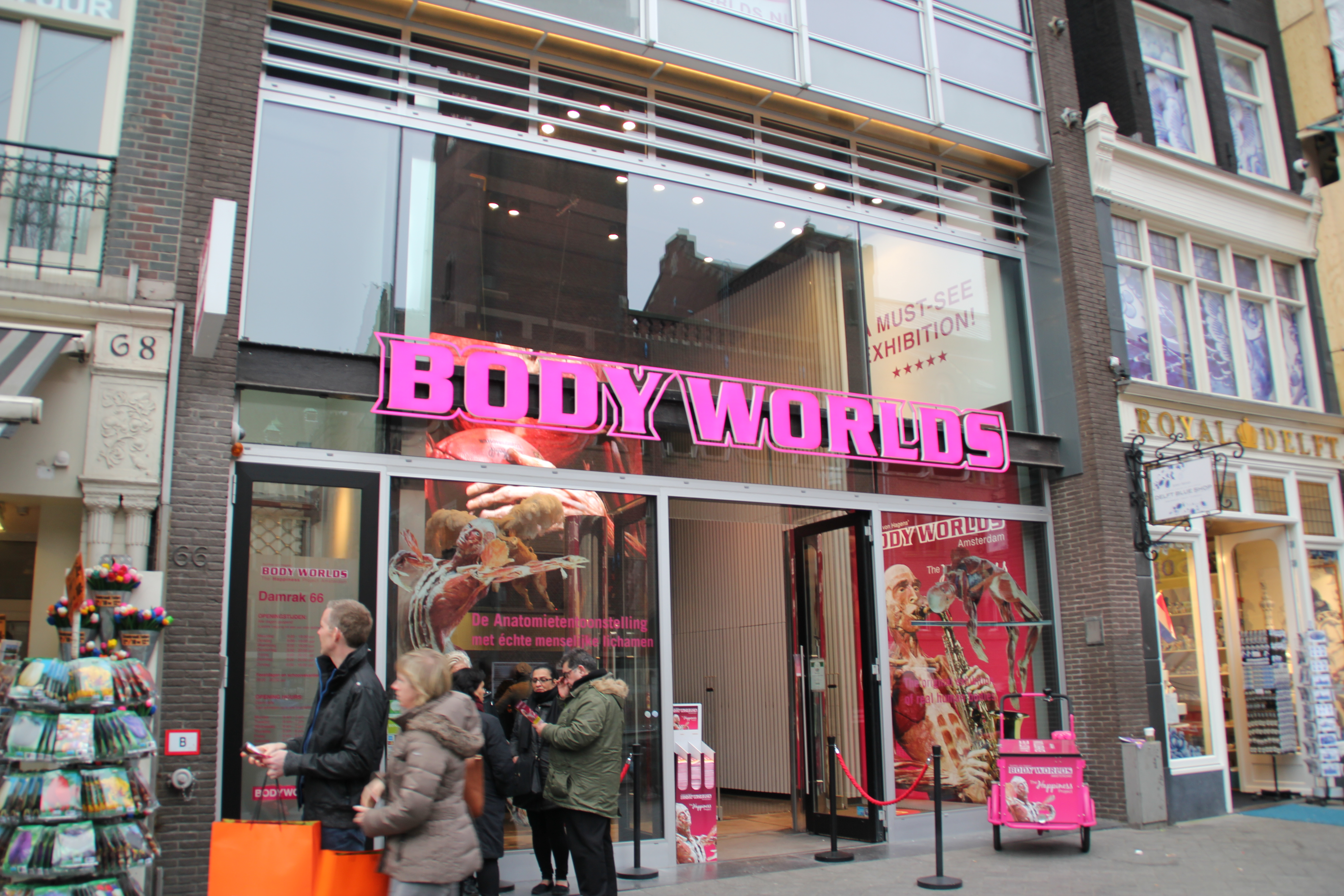
Storefront display of Body Worlds exhibition in Amsterdam (2016)

Body Worlds (German title: Körperwelten) is a traveling exposition of dissected human bodies, animals, and other anatomical structures of the body that have been preserved through the process of plastination. Gunther von Hagens developed the preservation process which "unite[s] subtle anatomy and modern polymer chemistry", in the late 1970s.

A series of Body Worlds anatomical exhibitions has toured many countries worldwide, sometimes raising controversies about the sourcing and display of actual human corpses and body parts. Von Hagens maintained that all human specimens were obtained with full knowledge and consent of the donors before they died, but this has not been independently verified, and in 2004 von Hagens returned seven corpses to China because they showed evidence of being executed prisoners. A competing exhibition, Bodies: The Exhibition, openly sources its bodies from "unclaimed bodies" in China, which can include executed prisoners.

In addition to temporary traveling exhibitions, permanent Body Worlds exhibits exist in Berlin, Amsterdam, Heidelberg, Guben, and San Jose, CA.

== Description ==
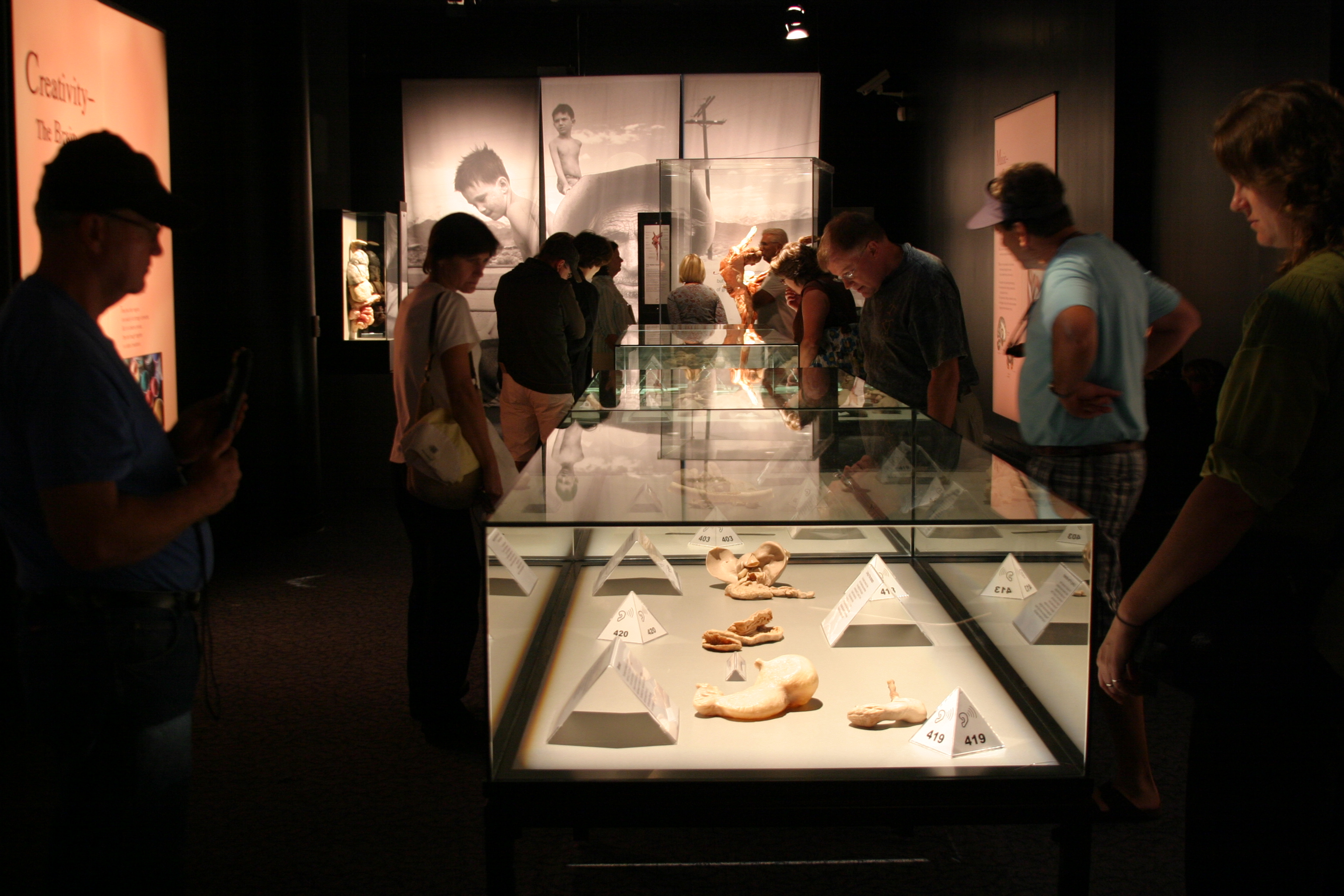
Gunther von Hagens' Body Worlds exhibition, San Diego, California, 2009

The exhibit states that its purpose and mission is the education of laypeople about the human body, leading to better health awareness. Each Body Worlds exhibition contains approximately 25 full-body plastinates with expanded or selective organs shown in positions that enhance the role of certain systems.

To produce specimens for Body Worlds, von Hagens employed around 100 people at his laboratory in Guben, Germany. One of the most difficult specimens to create was the giraffe that appears in Body Worlds: Animal Inside Out. The specimen took three years to complete—ten times longer than it takes to prepare a human body. Ten people are required to move the giraffe, because its final weight (like all specimens after plastination) is equal to the original animal.

Many of the whole-body specimens are partially dissected in the Écorché style of 17th and 18th century European tradition, while others are sliced in various anatomical planes to permit understanding of anatomical structure. In addition, more than 200 specimens of real human organs and organ systems are typically separately displayed in glass cases, some showing various medical conditions. Some of the whole-body specimens, such as the "Tai Chi Man", demonstrate interventions, and include prosthetics such as artificial hip joints or heart valves. Often featured is a liver with cirrhosis, and the lungs of a smoker and non-smoker are placed for side by side comparison. A prenatal display may feature fetuses and embryos, some with congenital disorders.

While Body Worlds attempts to maintain anonymity of it's donors, rarely personal objects belonging to the person are shown. Some donors who commit suicide have had the objects they kill themselves with displayed with them, such as a pregnant woman with the fetus plastinated inside her uterus and a man who killed himself by driving into a tree.

== Exhibitions ==
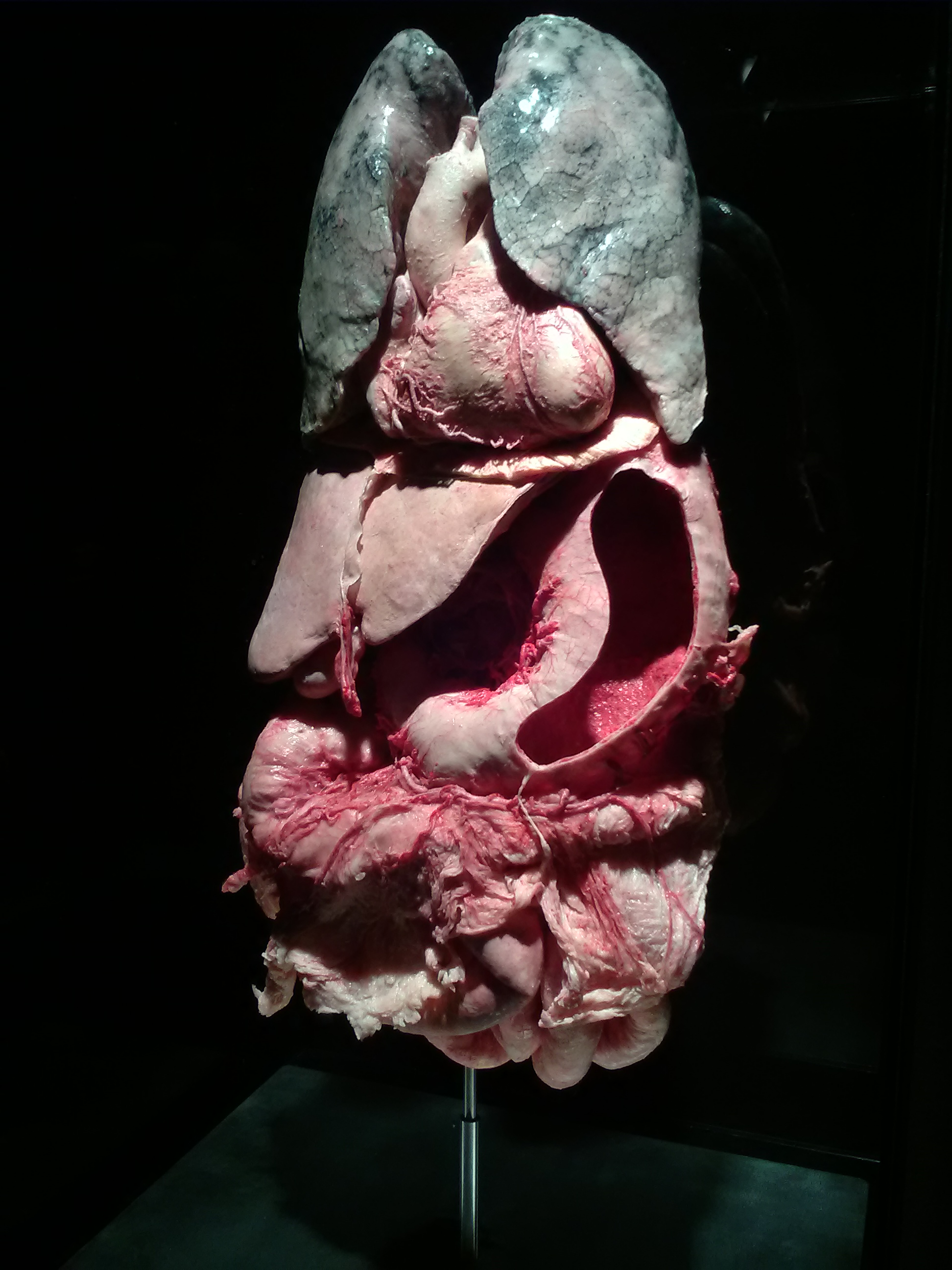
Plastinated human organs, at the Body Worlds exhibition in Poznań, Poland in 2018

Body Worlds exhibitions have received more than 50 million visitors, making them the world's most popular touring attraction. Body Worlds was first presented in Tokyo in 1995, and related exhibitions have since been hosted by more than 50 museums and venues in North America, Europe, and Asia. Body Worlds 2 & The Brain – Our Three Pound Gem (concerning the brain and nervous system) opened in 2005 at the California Science Center in Los Angeles. As of September 2010 it was showing at the Telus World of Science in Vancouver. Several Body Worlds exhibits (as well as von Hagens himself) were featured in the 2006 film Casino Royale. Among the plastinates seen were the Poker Playing Trio (which plays a key role in one scene) and Rearing Horse and Rider.

Body Worlds 3 & The Story of the Heart (concerning the cardiovascular system) opened on 25 February 2006, at the Houston Museum of Natural Science. On 9 July 2009 this show appeared at the Buffalo Museum of Science in Buffalo, New York. As of May 2010, it was showing at the Denver Museum of Nature and Science in Denver, Colorado. Body Worlds 4 debuted 22 February 2008 at the Museum of Science and Industry in Manchester in England and was in the Cureghem Cellars in Brussels until March 2009. Body Worlds & The Mirror of Time (featuring human development and aging) debuted at The O2 in London in October 2008. Körperwelten & Der Zyklus Des Lebens (The Cycle of Life) opened in Heidelberg in January 2009. Body Worlds: Animal Inside Out premiered in 2010 at a German Museum. It was first conceived when von Hagens received a gorilla, a giraffe, an elephant, a bear, a sturgeon, a camel, a caribou, a horse, a cow, a bull, a yak, a crocodile, an octopus, an ostrich, a monkey, a shark, a sheep, a goat, a dog, a rabbit, a duck, a great white shark, a seal, a frog, an oryx, a squid, and other various animals, all of which are being donated from various zoos, institutions, museums, and aquariums from around the world when they all died from various causes of deaths and demises. Body Worlds Vital was inaugurated at the Universum museum of the National Autonomous University of Mexico in 2012.

In 2017, the Tech Museum of Innovation in San Jose, California, opened a semi-permanent exhibition called Body Worlds Decoded. Sponsored by venture capitalist John Doerr and his wife Ann, the exhibit features plastinated specimens supplemented by augmented reality and a digital anatomy table. The exhibit is intended to run for at least 10 years.

== Education ==
Body Worlds has prepared free teaching guides for secondary school education, typically made available through organizations hosting its exhibitions.

In 2005, the New York University College of Dentistry experimented with replacing traditional laboratory dissection with the study of dissected and plastinated slices of specimens, for the training of beginning dental students.

== Regulatory framework ==
=== Czech Republic ===
In July 2008, the Czech Senate passed a law to address illegal trading in human tissue and ban "advertising of donation of human cells and tissues for money or similar advantages".

=== France ===
In response to the Paris exhibition of Our Body: The Universe Within, two local human rights groups filed a legal complaint against the owner of the exhibit, Gunther Von Hagens. The groups' lawyer, Richard Sedillot argued that exhibits profiting from the display of human bodies creates demand for bodies, incentivizing producing and trafficking more bodies through ethically dubious means. Potential scenarios given by Sedillot included structural violence such as neglecting medical patients or increasing in death sentences. Sedillot stated "I am convinced that the exhibition is the last step in a horrible traffic [sic] operation of human bodies originating in China."

On Tuesday 21 April 2009, Judge Louis-Marie Raingeard ruled to shut down the Paris exhibition immediately and seize all the displayed bodies and organs for burial. Raingeard stated: "Under the law, the proper place for corpses is in the cemetery", and added that exhibiting the dead for profit was a "violation of the respect owed to them". Von Hagens issued a press statement denying any connection between the closed Chinese exhibition and his Body Worlds franchise.

=== United Kingdom ===
==== England and Wales ====
The UK Parliament created legislation for exhibits of human remains, including plastinated bodies and body parts, in England and Wales under the Human Tissue Act 2004. This requires a licence to be granted by the Human Tissue Authority. The Human Tissue Act superseded the Anatomy Act 1832, which had been found by an independent commission (The Redfern Report) to be inadequate on contemporary collection and use of human tissues, following the Alder Hey organs scandal. There was initially controversy over whether the exhibition needed a licence in compliance with the Anatomy Act 1984. But, after consideration by the Department of Health, it was found that the legislation had not been designed to relate to exhibitions like Body Worlds and so no licence was required. In March 2008, the Manchester Museum of Science and Industry was granted such a licence to hold Body Worlds 4 and a further licence was granted to the exhibition in the O2, London, in 2008.

==== Scotland ====
The Human Tissue (Scotland) Act 2006 – which amended the Anatomy Act 1984 – covers Scotland. Under the terms of this Act, licences for the handling of human remains, including display, must be granted directly by the Scottish Ministry: "Subsection 9: If the Scottish Ministers think it desirable to do so in the interests of education, training or research, they may grant a license to a person to publicly display the body or, as the case may be, the part, and a person is authorized under this subsection to so display a body or a part of a body if, at the time of the display he is licensed under this subsection."

Various organizations gave evidence to the Scottish Executive during the consultation process, including the Royal College of Surgeons of Edinburgh, the Wellcome Trust, and the Museums Association.

=== United States ===
Various legislation has been proposed and enacted in different American states. Most proposals concentrate on issues regarding the sale of human remains and the consent of the donors.

National legislation on consent and tissue donation issues is expressed in the Uniform Anatomical Gift Act (2006) passed by the National Conference of Commissioners on Uniform State Laws which states that "an anatomical gift of a donor's body or part may be made during the life of the donor for the purpose of transplantation, therapy, research, or education", and prohibits trafficking in donated human organs for profit.

In early 2008, former US Republican Representative W. Todd Akin proposed an amendment to the Smoot–Hawley Tariff Act of 1930 to "make it unlawful for a person to import plastinated human remains into the United States." The President of the American Association of Anatomists has expressed concern that the scope of the act is "too broad" and that "Preventing importation of all plastinated specimens could severely restrict their use for medical education." The amendment was not enacted during the 2007–2008 Congressional session.

==== California ====
California's proposed bill AB1519 (Ma), sponsored by Assemblywoman Fiona Ma, tried to "require exhibitors to get a county permit; to do so, they would have to prove to county health officials that the people whose cadavers were on display—or their next of kin—had consented".

Assembly Bill 1519 would have made California the first state to require such proof. It was vetoed by Governor Arnold Schwarzenegger on 26 September 2008.

==== Florida ====
The state of Florida prohibits the sale or purchase of human remains and "Authorizes certain science centers located in this state to transport plastinated bodies into, within, or out of this state and exhibit such bodies for the purpose of public education without the consent of this state's anatomical board if the science center notifies the board of any such transportation or exhibition, as well as the location and duration of any exhibition, at least 30 days before such transportation or exhibition". The Museum of Science and History in Jacksonville and the Museum of Science and Industry in Tampa have hosted BODY WORLDS exhibitions.

==== Hawaii ====
In January 2009, Rep. Marcus Oshiro introduced two bills prompted by presentation of the BODIES Exhibition in that state. HB28 Relating to Dead Human Bodies would add to the prohibition against buying dead human bodies, the selling of dead human bodies and defines the term "dead human body" to include plastinated bodies and body parts. It would increase the fine for buying or selling a dead human body to up to $5,000. HB29 Relating to Dead Human Bodies would prohibit the commercial display of dead human bodies without a permit from the Department of Health.

==== New York ====
In June 2008, New York State Senate passed legislation regulating body exhibits. A bill that was sponsored by Senator Jim Alesi requires anyone showing an exhibit that uses real human bodies in New York museums to produce a permit detailing their origin. BODY WORLDS was hosted at Discovery Times Square in New York City.

==== Pennsylvania ====
Representative Mike Fleck's proposed bill would require evidence of informed consent from the decedent or relatives of all humans whose remains are put on display. BODY WORLDS exhibitions have been hosted in Philadelphia at the Franklin Institute and in Allentown at the Da Vinci Science Center.

==== Washington ====
The state of Washington considered a bill that would "require written authorization to display human remains for a commercial purpose".

== Controversies ==
=== Consent ===
There have been several reports of corpses in the Body Worlds exhibit being prepared and shown without consent. In January 2004, the German news magazine Der Spiegel reported, based on internal emails and records as well as statements from von Hagens, that his company had acquired corpses of Chinese prisoners from capital punishment. In response to the article, von Hagens said that he has told his Chinese employees not to accept bodies that were executed, and returned seven cadavers to China that had head injuries, including at least two with bullet holes in the skull. In 2004, von Hagens obtained an injunction against Der Spiegel for making the claims. Paul Harris, director of North Carolina's State Board of Funeral Services, has stated, "Somebody at some level of government ought to be able to look at a death certificate, a statement from an embalmer, donation documents... That's a reasonable standard to apply." Assemblywoman Fiona Ma (D-San Francisco) said, "These displays do have important educational benefits, but using bodies against a person's will is unacceptable".

In 2002, two Russian doctors from the University of Novosibirsk were charged with illegally supplying von Hagens with 56 bodies, including convicts, homeless people, and mentally ill people, without consent from their relatives. Von Hagens said that none of the body parts were used in the Body Worlds exhibitions. Bodies from the Kyrgyz State Medical Academy were also found to have been obtained illegally in 2005.

Consent is not regulated worldwide according to the same ethical standards, raising ethical concerns. "[P]aperwork is... separated from the bodies, which can be used for displays or sold in pieces to medical schools. No one will know for sure, because each plastinated corpse is made anonymous to protect its privacy." Hans Martin Sass, a philosophy professor with a speciality in ethics, was hired by the California Science Center to investigate Body Worlds before the show's US debut in 2004. He matched over 200 donation forms to death certificates, but he did not match the paperwork to specific bodies von Hagens has on display.

=== Import laws ===
International trade experts have objected to the way in which bodies for commercial display are imported, because the way their categorization codes (as "art collections") do not require Centers for Disease Control stamps or death certificates, both of which are required for medical cadavers. In most countries plastinated human specimens are classified under Customs Classification Code 97050000.48 "items in anatomical collections". This customs code encompasses "zoological, botanical, mineralogical or anatomical collections or items in such collections."

=== Ethical concerns about cadaver displays ===
In an ethical analysis, Thomas Hibbs, professor of ethics and culture at Baylor University, a private Baptist-affiliated institution, compared cadaver displays to pornography, in that they reduce the subject to "the manipulation of body parts stripped of any larger human significance."

In a 2006 lecture entitled "Plasti-Nation: How America was Won", Lucia Tanassi, professor of medical ethics and anthropology at Vanderbilt University Medical Center, explored questions for ethicists regarding this new scientific frontier. Tanassi called it provocative that ethics committees have contributed to the popularization of the exhibits without setting forth any process of a line of inquiry, pointing to an ethics report from the California Science Center. As part of that review, bioethicist Hans Martin Sass was sent to Heidelberg to match donor consents with death certificates.

Concerns have been expressed about the educational aspects, especially the inclusion of these displays for school field trips. St. Louis Archbishop Raymond Burke strongly suggested that Catholic schools avoid scheduling field trips, stating that parents, and not children, should retain the freedom of deciding whether or not their children will view the exhibit. Concerned with how "some kids process" these "graphic" images, Des McKay, school superintendent in Abbotsford, British Columbia (near Greater Vancouver), barred field trips to exhibits of plasticized human beings. In an editorial to the Abbotsford News, Rev. Christoph Reiners questions what effect the exhibits will have on the values of children attending for school field trips. Others—such as the Catholic Schools Office of Phoenix—acknowledge the educational content of Body Worlds. Reporting on the exhibition at the O2 bubble in 2008/2009, Melanie Reid of The Times stated "(Body Worlds) should be compulsory viewing for every child of 10 or over".

=== Religious objections ===
Religious groups, including some rabbis have objected to the display of human remains, stating that it is inconsistent with reverence towards the human body. A group of Catholic Christians voiced their opinions towards the Body Worlds exhibition in a reflection paper written by the Archdiocese of Milwaukee. This was in response to the arrival of the Body Worlds Exhibition in the Milwaukee Public Museum in 2014. The group were largely in favour of the exhibition due to its educational goals. But, the paper also discussed fears surrounding whether the exhibit's educational aims were secondary to the experience of voyeurism. There were also concerns over the display of plastinated fetuses, due to beliefs surrounding abortion.

=== Sex plastinate ===
In 2003, while promoting a display in the Hamburg Museum of Erotica, von Hagens announced his intention to create a sex plastinate. In May 2009 he unveiled a plastinate of a couple having sex, intended for a Berlin exhibition. The original Berlin display was shown in the open to all visitors. The municipality of Augsburg prohibited the body worlds exhibition the day before it was scheduled to open because of the sex plastinate. Later exhibitions that year had to cover the plastinate with gold foil and restrict access of it to those aged 16 and over. In the following years it was allowed to be display uncovered in an adult-only section, after public backlash von Hagens said that the two individuals consented to the display before their death.

=== Lessening donor organ availability ===
In 2007, the Bishop of Manchester launched a campaign to coincide with the opening of Body Worlds in that city, accusing the exhibitors of being "body snatchers" and "robbing the NHS", arguing that donation of bodies for plastination would deprive the National Health Service of organs for transplant. The site included a government petition calling for "a review of the law regarding the policies and practices of touring shows involving corpses".

=== Press limitations ===
Von Hagens maintained tight copyright control over pictures of his exhibits. Visitors were not allowed to take pictures, and press photographers were required to sign restrictive agreements permitting only a single publication in a defined context, followed by a return of the copyright to von Hagens. Because of a similar agreement applied to sound bites (O-Töne, in German) a German press organization suggested that the press refrain from reporting about the exhibition in Munich in 2003. In recent years, the restriction on photography has been relaxed for personal non-publication use only.

=== Sale of plastinates ===
Von Hagen's website offers plastinated pieces for sale. There are a wide range of products from plastinated fruit jewelry to entire humans. Although some of the pieces require purchasers to be a qualified user—those intending to use the pieces for "research, educational, medical or therapeutic purposes"—many pieces, including animal testicles and baby chicks, require no authorization. There are also realistic plastinate impressions of human hearts and slices (including one slice of copulating humans) for sale to the general public.

== Competitors ==
The success of Body Worlds has given rise to several similar shows featuring plastinated cadavers, including BODIES... The Exhibition and Our Body: The Universe Within in the United States, Bodies Revealed in the United Kingdom, Body Exploration in Taiwan, Mysteries of the Human Body in South Korea, Jintai Plastomic: Mysteries of the Human Body in Japan, Cuerpos Entrañables in Spain.

Some of these contain exhibits very similar to von Hagens' plastinates; von Hagens asserted copyright protection, and sued Body Exploration and Bodies Revealed. The suits were based on a presumed copyright of certain positions of the bodies, but the counterparty asserts that the human body in its diversity cannot be copyrighted.

Such lawsuits have not stopped the competition. While the Korean police in Seoul confiscated a few exhibits from Bodies Revealed, the exhibition went on successfully.

Several of the competing exhibitions have been organized by the publicly traded US company Premier Exhibitions. They started their first Bodies Revealed exhibition in Blackpool, England which ran from August through October 2004. In 2005 and 2006 the company opened their Bodies Revealed and BODIES... The Exhibition exhibitions in Seoul, Tampa, Miami, New York City, and Seattle. Other exhibition sites in 2006 were Mexico City; Atlanta, Georgia, US; London; and Las Vegas, Nevada.

Unlike Body Worlds, none of the competing exhibitions or their suppliers have a body donation programme. Dr Roy Glover, a spokesperson for BODIES... The Exhibition said all their exhibits use unclaimed cadavers from China, a category which the Laogai Research Foundation has charged could include executed prisoners. In May 2008, a settlement with the attorney general of New York obliged Premier Exhibitions to offer refunds to visitors when it could not prove consent for the use of the bodies in its exhibitions. New York Attorney General Andrew Cuomo commented: "Despite repeated denials, we now know that Premier itself cannot demonstrate the circumstances that led to the death of the individuals. Nor is Premier able to establish that these people consented to their remains being used in this manner."

== See also ==
- Bodies: The Exhibition
- Embalming
- Mummification
- Organ transplantation in China
- Plastination
- Musée Fragonard d'Alfort museum of historical écorchés

== External links and sources ==
- True Anatomy for New Ways of Teaching von Hagens Plastination offers one-of-a-kind, real human teaching specimens!
- Official website (English and German)
- Media related to Body Worlds at Wikimedia Commons
