= Plastination =

Technique used in anatomy to preserve bodies or body parts

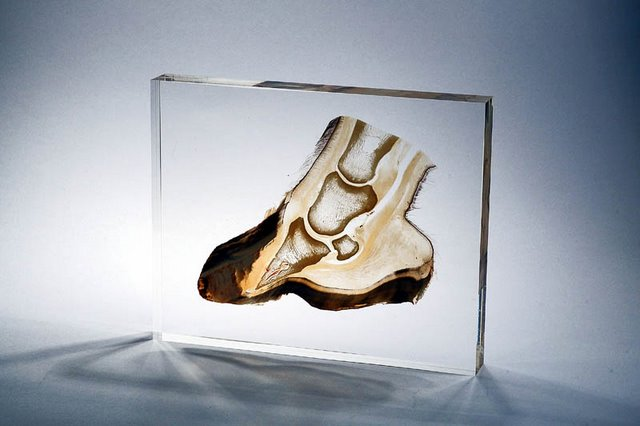
A plastinated and sectioned example of a diseased horse's hoof, mounted for teaching purposes

Plastination is a technique or process used in anatomy to preserve bodies or body parts, first developed by Gunther von Hagens in 1977. The water and fat are replaced by certain plastics, yielding specimens that can be touched, do not smell or decay, and even retain most properties of the original sample.

== Process ==
The centerpiece of plastination: "forced impregnation"

Four steps are followed in the standard process of plastination: fixation, dehydration, forced impregnation in a vacuum, and hardening. Water and lipid tissues are replaced by curable polymers, which include silicone, epoxy, and polyester-copolymer.

The first step of plastination, fixation, frequently uses a formaldehyde-based solution, and serves two functions. Dissecting the specimen to show specific anatomical elements can be time-consuming. Formaldehyde or other preserving solutions help prevent decomposition of the tissues. They may also confer a degree of rigidity. This can be beneficial in maintaining the shape or arrangement of a specimen. A stomach might be inflated or a leg bent at the knee, for example.

After any necessary dissections have taken place, the specimen is placed in a bath of −20 to −30 °C (−4 to −22 °F) liquid acetone. The volume of the bath should be 10 times that of the specimen. The acetone is renewed two times over the course of six weeks. The acetone draws out all the water and replaces it inside the cells.

In the third step, the specimen is then placed in a bath of liquid polymer, such as silicone rubber, polyester, or epoxy resin. In a partial vacuum, the acetone is made to boil at a low temperature. As the acetone vaporizes and leaves the cells, it draws the liquid polymer in behind it, leaving a cell filled with liquid plastic.

The plastic must then be cured with gas, heat, or ultraviolet light, to harden it.

Specimens, which can vary from a full human body to a small piece of an animal organ, are known as 'plastinates'. Once plastinated, the specimens and bodies are further manipulated and positioned prior to curing (hardening) of the polymer chains.

== History ==
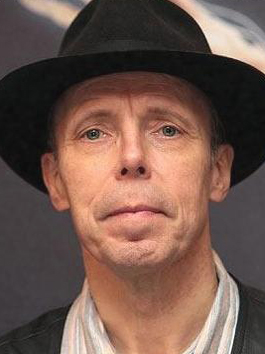
German anatomist Gunther von Hagens, the inventor of plastination

In November 1979, Gunther von Hagens applied for a German patent, proposing the idea of preserving animal and vegetable tissues permanently by synthetic resin impregnation. Since then, von Hagens has applied for further US patents regarding work on preserving biological tissues with polymers.

With the success of his patents, von Hagens went on to form the Institute for Plastination in Heidelberg, Germany in 1993. The Institute for Plastination, along with von Hagens, made their first showing of plastinated bodies in Japan in 1995, which drew more than three million visitors. The institute maintains three international centres of plastination, in Germany (Heidelberg-Rohrbach), Kyrgyzstan, and China.

By 2005 imitation methods for plastination were developed which circumvented patents belonging to von Hagens. Displays unaffiliated with von Hagens and his organizations have emerged since then.

== Related preservation methods ==
Other methods have been in place for thousands of years to halt the decomposition of the body. Mummification used by the ancient Egyptians is a widely known method which involves the removal of body fluid and wrapping the body in linens. Prior to mummification, Egyptians would lay the body in a shallow pit in the desert and allow the sun to dehydrate the body.

Formalin, an important solution to body preservation, was introduced in 1896 to help with body preservation. Soon to follow formalin, color-preserving embalming solutions were developed to preserve lifelike color and flexibility to aid in the study of the body.

Paraffin impregnation was introduced in 1925, and the embedding of organs in plastic was developed in the 1960s.

Body preservation methods current to the 21st century are cryopreservation, which involves the cooling of the body to very low temperatures to preserve the body tissues, plastination, and embalming.

Other methods used in modern times include the Silicone S 10 Standard Procedure, the Cor-Tech Room temperature procedure, the Epoxy E 12 procedure, and the Polyester P 35 (P 40) procedure. The Silicone S 10 is the procedure most often used in plastination and creates opaque, natural-looking specimen., Dow Corning Corporation's Cor-Tech Room Temperature Procedure is designed to allow plastination of specimen at room temperature to various degrees of flexibility using three combinations of polymer, crosslinker, and catalyst. According to the International Society for Plastination, the Epoxy E 12 procedure is used "for thin, transparent, and firm body and organ slices", while the Polyester P 35 (P 40) preserves "semitransparent and firm brain slices". Samples are prepared for fixation through the first method by deep freezing, while the second method works best following 4–6 weeks of preparation in a formaldehyde mixture.

== Uses of plastinated specimens ==
Plastination is useful in anatomy, serving as models and teaching tools. It is used at more than 40 medical and dental schools throughout the world as an adjunct to anatomical dissection.

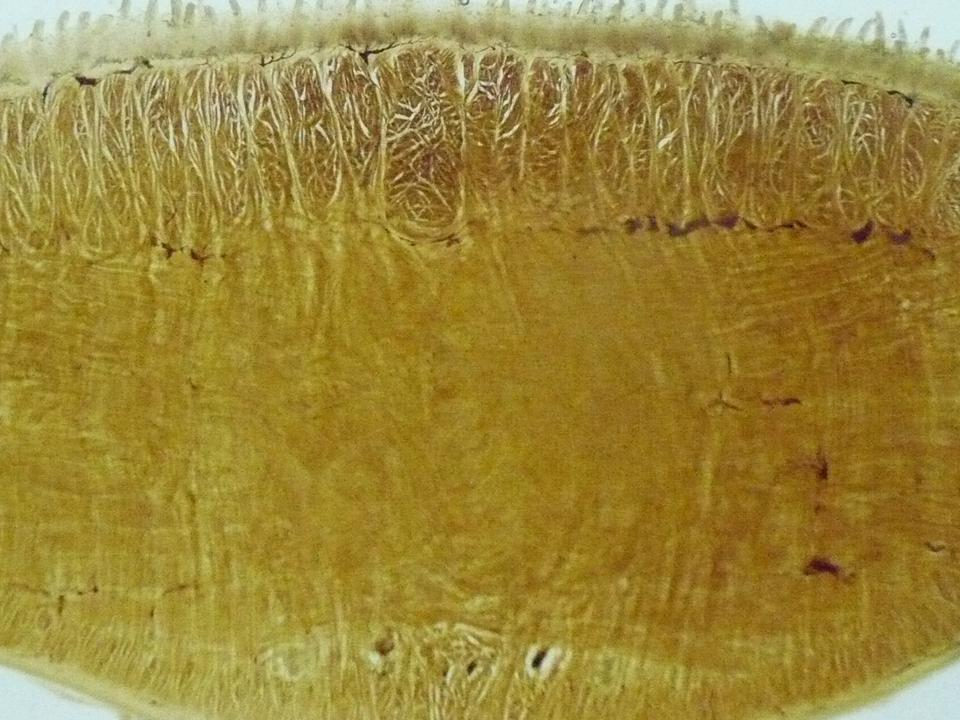
Histological section of bovine tongue, epoxy technique

Students enrolled in introductory animal science courses at many universities learn animal science through collections of multispecies large-animal specimens. Plastination allows students to have hands-on experience in this field, without exposure to chemicals such as formalin. For example, plastinated canine gastrointestinal tracts are used to help in the teaching of endoscopic technique and anatomy. The plastinated specimens retain their dilated conformation by a positive pressure air flow during the curing process, which allows them to be used to teach both endoscopic technique and gastrointestinal anatomy.

With the use of plastination as a teaching method of animal science, fewer animals have to be killed for research, as the plastination process allows specimens to be studied for a long time.

TTT sheet plastinates for school teaching and lay instruction provide an impression of the complexity of an animal body in one specimen.

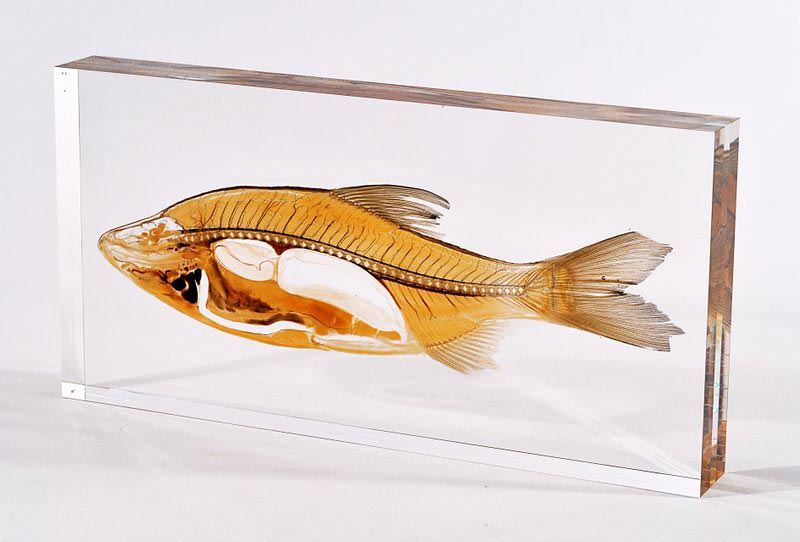
TTT sheet plastinate of a fish

North Carolina State University's College of Veterinary Medicine in Raleigh, North Carolina, uses both plastic coating (PC) and plastination (PN) to investigate and compare the difference in the two methods. The PC method was simple and inexpensive, but the PN specimens were more flexible, durable, and lifelike than those preserved by the PC method. The use of plastination allowed the use of many body parts such as muscle, nerves, bones, ligaments, and central nervous system to be preserved.

The University of Texas Health Science Center at San Antonio was the first school in the United States to use this technique to prepare gross organ specimens for use in teaching. The New York University College of Dentistry, Philadelphia College of Osteopathic Medicine, University of Warwick, and University of Northumbria use collections of plastinates as teaching aids. The University of Vienna and the University of Sheffield have their own plastination laboratories. The first medical school in India to have a plastination lab was A.I.I.M.S, New Delhi with others following suit like Christian Medical College, Vellore, Government Institute of Medical Sciences, Greater Noida etc.

== Ethical concerns ==
Concern over consent of bodies being used in the plastination process has arisen. Over 20 years ago, von Hagens set up a body donation program in Germany and has signed over 9,000 donors into the plastinate program: 531 have already died. The program has reported an average of one body a day being released to the plastination process. About 90% of the donors registered are German. Von Hagens' body donations are now being managed by the Institute for Plastination (IfP) established in 1993.

Von Hagens has also been accused of unethically purchasing bodies for plastination, such as those of executed prisoners, homeless people, and the mentally ill. In 2004 Von Hagens agreed to send back 7 plastinations produced in China after a report said he had knowingly used remains of executed prisoners to create them; he maintained that he did not believe they were from executed prisoners however.

Bodies: The Exhibition, which is completely unaffiliated with von Hagens, openly states that it obtains it's displays from unclaimed corpses in China instead of donations, it has been heavily speculated this include bodies from executed prisoners.

=== Religious opposition ===
A number of religious sects prohibit organ donation. Ultra-Orthodox Jews oppose post mortem organ donation, and have tried to pass laws against unclaimed cadavers being used in research. A number of religious organizations, including Catholic and Jewish ones, object to the display of plastinated body parts at public exhibitions.

== Plastination exhibitions ==
For the first 20 years, plastination was used to preserve small specimens for medical study. In the early 1990s, the equipment was developed to make plastinating whole body specimens possible, each specimen taking up to 1,500-man-hours to prepare. The first exhibition of whole bodies was displayed by von Hagens in Japan in 1995.

Over the next two years, von Hagens developed the Körperwelten (Body Worlds) public exhibitions, showing whole bodies plastinated in lifelike poses and dissected to show various structures and systems of human anatomy. The earliest exhibitions were presented in the Far East and in Germany, and Gunther von Hagens' exhibitions have subsequently been hosted by museums and venues in more than 50 cities worldwide, attracting more than 29 million visitors.

Gunther von Hagens' Body Worlds exhibitions are the original, precedent-setting public anatomical exhibitions of real human bodies, and the only anatomical exhibits that use donated bodies, willed by donors to the Institute for Plastination for the express purpose of serving the Body Worlds mission to educate the public about health and anatomy. To date, more than 10,000 people have agreed to donate their bodies to Institute for Plastination.

In 2004, Premier Exhibitions began their "Bodies Revealed" exhibition in Blackpool, England, which ran from August through October 2004. In 2005 and 2006, the company opened their "Bodies Revealed" and "Bodies...The Exhibition" in Seoul, Tampa, and New York City. The West Coast exhibition site opened on 22 June 2006 at the Tropicana Resort and Casino Las Vegas. As of June 2009, BODIES... The Exhibition is showing at the Ambassador Theatre in Dublin, Ireland. The exhibition was in Istanbul, Turkey, until the end of March 2011.

Plastination galleries are offered in several college medical schools, including the University of Michigan (which Michigan Daily reported possessed the United States' largest such lab in 2007), Vienna University, and the JSS Medical Collegem Gunther von Hagens maintains a permanent exhibition of plastinates and plastination at the Plastinarium in Guben, Germany.

== See also ==
- Écorché
- Freeze drying
- Moulage
- Girolamo Segato
