= Gunther von Hagens =

German anatomist and inventor of plastination (1945–2026)

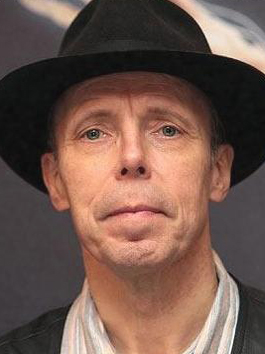
- Gunther von Hagens in 2009
- Born: Gunther Gerhard Liebchen; 10 January 1945; Skalmierzyce, Greater Poland Voivodeship, Poland
- Died: 24 July 2026 (aged 81); Heidelberg, Germany
- Occupation: Anatomist
- Spouse: Angelina Whalley
- Children: 3

Gunther von Hagens (born Gunther Gerhard Liebchen; 10 January 1945 – 24 July 2026) was a German anatomist, businessman, and lecturer. He developed the technique for preserving biological tissue specimens called plastination, which he would display in his Body Worlds public exhibitions.

Von Hagens invented and patented the process of plastination between 1977 and 1982 while at the University of Heidelberg. Years later he would apply the technique to whole human bodies which he first displayed in his Body Worlds exhibitions in 1995. Body Worlds would go on to tour Europe, Asia, and North America and had received 58 Million visitors by the time of his death; von Hagens adopted an eccentric public persona and became a major advocate for anatomical education. The sourcing of biological specimens for and the commercial background of his exhibits have attracted significant controversial, although he rarely received legal charges.

Von Hagens stepped down from his Institute for Bioplasticization and private companies with his son taking over in 2011 due to his Parkinson's. He died in 2026 still a controversial figure, supporters argued that he democratized the human body and educated the public on anatomy while critics claimed he was medically unethical and relied on sensationalism.

== Early life and education ==
Von Hagens was born Gunther Gerhard Liebchen in Alt-Skalden (now called Skalmierzyce) near Ostrowo, Reichsgau Wartheland, in German-annexed Poland. Gerhard Liebchen, his father, was a member of the SS of Nazi Germany. When he was five days old, his parents took him on a six-month trek westwards, to escape from the advancing Red Army and the imminent Soviet occupation. The family lived briefly in Berlin and its vicinity, before finally settling in Greiz, a town which was allocated to the Soviet occupation zone, so that von Hagens grew up in East Germany. He lived in Greiz until the age of nineteen.

A haemophiliac, as a child von Hagens spent six months in hospital after being injured. This stimulated an interest in medical science, and in 1965 he began to study medicine at the University of Jena. While there, he began to question communism and socialism, and widened his knowledge of politics by gathering information from non-communist news sources. He participated in student protests against the 1968 invasion of Czechoslovakia by Warsaw Pact troops. In January 1969, disguised as a vacationing student, he made his way across Bulgaria and Hungary, and on 8 January attempted to cross the Czechoslovak border into Austria. He failed, but made a second attempt the next day, at another location along the border. He was arrested and punished with two years in a Stasi prison.

In 1970, the West German government paid the East German authorities DM43,000 for von Hagens's freedom, alongside several others, on the grounds that he was a political prisoner. He continued his medical studies in Lübeck and received a doctorate in 1975 from the University of Heidelberg. When he married his first wife, he changed his surname from Liebchen to that of his wife, "von Hagens".

== Career ==
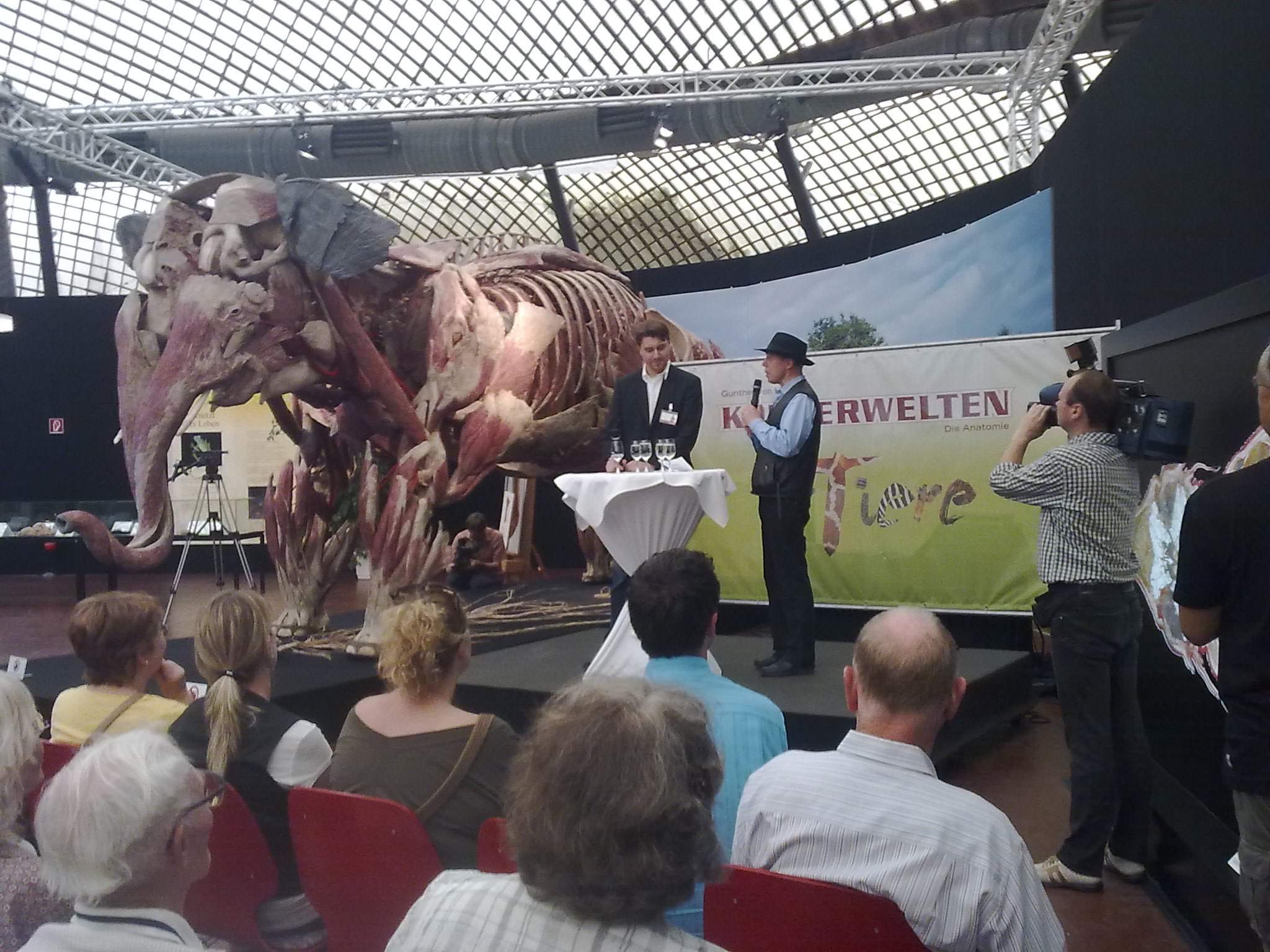
Gunther von Hagens with a Plastinated Elephant at a press conference, 2010.

Von Hagens is best known for his plastination technique, which he invented and patented between 1977 and 1982. In 1982, von Hagens was appointed a lecturer in the Institutes of Anatomy and Pathology at the University of Heidelberg, and in 1993 he founded the Institute of Plastination in Heidelberg. By 2004, he had been in the city for 22 years. In 1996 he became a visiting professor at Dalian in China, where he ran a second plastination institute, and he also directed a plastination center at the State Medical Academy in Bishkek, Kyrgyzstan. From 2004, von Hagens was also a guest professor at the New York University College of Dentistry.

In its first twenty years, plastination was used to preserve small specimens of tissue for medical study. It was not until the early 1990s that equipment was developed to make it possible to plastinate whole body specimens, each specimen taking up to 1,500 hours of work to prepare. The first exhibition of whole plastinated bodies took place in Japan in 1995, beforehand plastinated bodies were show exclusively at universities, however professor Takeshi Yoro(JA) invited him to display them to the public. The original plastinated bodies were displayed akin to typical anatomical specimens, von Hagens noticed that the bodies were described as scary by visitors, this led him to begin making plastination in "extravagant poses" and leaving the eyebrows intact for expressiveness, which soon became the signature style. He would say in a 2007 interview "I took the fear out and put the humor in".

Over the next two years, von Hagens developed his first Body Worlds exhibition, showing whole bodies plastinated in lifelike poses and dissected to show various structures and systems of human anatomy, and these have since met with public interest and controversy in more than fifty cities around the world. The exhibition, and von Hagens's subsequent exhibitions Body Worlds 2, 3 and 4, had received more than 26 million visitors all over the world as of 2008.

To produce specimens for a Body Worlds exhibition, von Hagens employed around 100 people at his laboratory in Guben, Germany. Besides humans the laboratory has also plastinated various animals. The plastinated giraffe which appeared in Body Worlds 3 & The Story of the Heart and is now part of Body Worlds: Animal Inside Out was one of the most difficult specimens to create, taking a total of three years – ten times longer than it takes to prepare a human body. Ten people were required to move the giraffe, because its final weight, like all specimens after plastination, was equal to its original weight.

He developed new body sectioning methods that yield very thin slices, which can then be plastinated and used for anatomical studies. He was also developing similar techniques for specimens as large as elephants. He worked in a concealed laboratory, with an entrance behind a movable staircase, where he developed his wafer plastination techniques.

== Controversies ==
Religious groups, including representatives of the Roman Catholic Church and rabbi She'ar Yashuv Cohen, have objected to the display of human remains, stating that it is inconsistent with reverence towards the human body. The archbishop of Miami said that von Hagens would go to Hell.

During his early displays in the United Kingdom von Hagens was frequently accused of sensationalism and using the bodies as entertainment instead of education. It was noted that Body Worlds originally displayed the plastinations in exhibit spaces used by fashion shows instead of museums or other areas associated with learning and that the lighting and methods of display obscured many details. Conversely some anatomists have said that von Hagens work has democratized the body and allowed a greater number of people to see human anatomy.

In 2002 von Hagens performed the first public autopsy to take place in the United Kingdom in 170 years, the previous one being of Jeremy Bentham, before a sold-out audience of 500 people in a London theatre. Prior to performing the autopsy, he had received a letter from Her Majesty's Inspector of Anatomy, the British government official responsible for regulating the educational use of cadavers. The letter warned von Hagens that performing a public autopsy would be a criminal act under section 11 of the Anatomy Act 1984. The show was attended by officers from the Metropolitan Police, but they did not intervene, and the dissection was performed in full. The autopsy was shown in November 2002 on the British Channel 4 television channel; it resulted in over 130 complaints, an OFCOM record, but the Independent Television Commission ruled that the program had not been sensationalist and had not broken broadcasting rules. The autopsy was questioned over its educational value; it was noted that von Hagens did so little to inform the viewers during the process that halfway through his assistant had to take over commentary. The head of the British Medical Association denounced the autopsy as lacking any educational value.

In 2003, the television production company Mentorn proposed a documentary called Futurehuman, in which von Hagens would perform a series of modifications on a corpse to demonstrate "improvements" to human anatomy. Controversy was sparked when the company, with von Hagens, appealed publicly for a terminally ill person to donate their body for the project. A donor was found, but the documentary was cancelled after the body donor pulled out.

In February 2004, the German newspaper Süddeutsche Zeitung confirmed earlier reports by the German TV station ARD that von Hagens had offered a one-time payment and a lifelong pension to Alexander Sizonenko, reported to be one of the world's tallest men at 2.48 m (8 ft 2 in), if he would agree to have his body transferred to the Institute of Plastination after his death. Sizonenko had played basketball for the Soviet Union and was later plagued by numerous health problems until his death in 2012. He declined the offer.

After several legal challenges to the Body Worlds exhibition in Germany, in the Summer of 2004 von Hagens announced that it would be leaving the country. From 2004 onwards, the exhibitions toured North America, returning to Europe in 2007 with an exhibition in Manchester, England, and ending in Copenhagen, Denmark, in 2011. Starting in 2009, von Hagens also exhibited in Germany again and opened permanent exhibits in Berlin in 2015 and in Heidelberg in 2017. His exhibition also went on display in Israel in 2009.

In 2004, Von Hagens was accused by the German newsmagazine Der Spiegel of displaying bodies of executed Chinese prisoners who had their organs harvested and agreed to return them to China for burial. Von Hagens had stored 647 bodies at his business in Liaoning province, China. At least two bodies with bullet holes in their skulls were sourced from what Von Hagens stated were "official sources", and documents revealed by Der Spiegel appeared to show that he knew that these were executed bodies; others might have been victims of crimes, according to his statement. Von Hagens plastination factory in Dalian continued to work on human corpses until 2006, 2 years later the site closed entirely. Allegations that von Hagens was collaborating with Dalian's mayor Bo Xilai to obtain corpses, and that operations ceased due to Bo Xilai leaving for another position in 2006, were later published. Von Hagens son Rurik denied the allegations in a 2012 interview and stated that the site closed due to a change in China's policy towards body importation, although he admitted they have only ever obtained 1 donated body from China.

== Legal proceedings ==
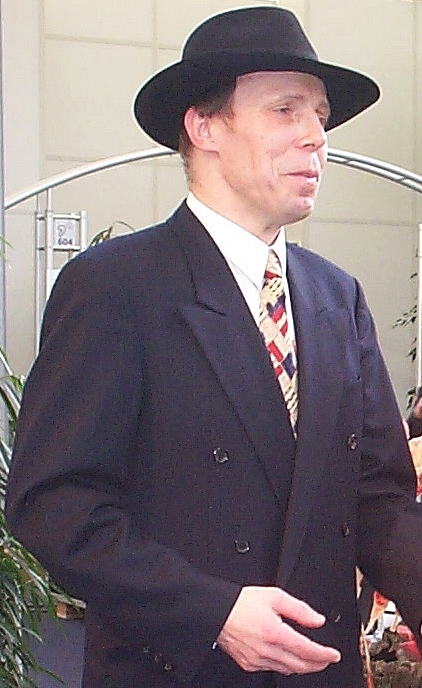
Gunther von Hagens in Cologne, 2000

In 2002 there were legal proceedings against a senior pathologist and coroner in Siberia regarding a shipment of 56 corpses to Heidelberg. The police maintained that the Novosibirsk coroner, Vladimir Novosylov, had sold the bodies illegally to buyers outside of Russia. Von Hagens was not charged in the case, but he was called as a witness against Novosylov. The authorities stopped the shipment of bodies and the agreement between Novosibirsk and von Hagens was terminated.

In October 2003, a parliamentary committee in Kyrgyzstan investigated accusations that von Hagens had illegally received and plastinated several hundred corpses from prisons, psychiatric institutions and hospitals in Kyrgyzstan, some without prior notification of the families. Von Hagens himself testified to the committee; he said he had received nine corpses from Kyrgyzstan hospitals, that none of them had been used for the Body Worlds exhibition, and that he was neither involved with nor responsible for the notification of the families.

In 2003, an animal rights organization filed a complaint alleging that von Hagens did not have correct papers for a gorilla he had plastinated. He had received the cadaver from the Hanover Zoo, where the animal had died.

In 2003, the University of Heidelberg filed a criminal complaint against von Hagens, claiming that he had misrepresented himself as a professor from a German university in a Chinese document, and that in Germany he had failed to state the foreign origin of his title. After a trial, he received a fine in March 2004. On 25 April 2005, a Heidelberg court imposed a fine of €108,000 (equivalent to 90 days of his daily income as assessed by the court) for one count of using an academic title that he was not entitled to, but acquitted him on four other counts. On appeal, a higher court in September 2006 reduced the penalty to a warning with a suspended fine of €50,000, which under German law is not deemed a prior criminal conviction. In 2007 the charge of title misuse was finally dismissed by the Federal Court of Justice of Germany in Karlsruhe.

German prosecutors declined to press charges, and in March 2005 von Hagens was granted an interim injunction against Der Spiegel, preventing the magazine from claiming that Body Worlds contained the bodies of executed prisoners.

== Personal life and death ==
Von Hagens described himself as an agnostic, believing that the human mind is not constructed to answer such a question as the existence of God, and he instead put all his faith into the human body.

He was married to Angelina Whalley, the creative director of the Body Worlds exhibitions. He has three children from his first marriage and also retained his first wife's surname, "von Hagens". von Hagens ran his companies as a family business, his wife was a curator at Body Worlds and his son Rurik took over his bioplasticization business in 2011. When appearing in public, even when performing anatomical dissections, von Hagens always wore a black fedora (a reference to the hat worn in The Anatomy Lesson of Dr. Nicolaes Tulp by Rembrandt).

Von Hagens said that his grand goal is the founding of a "Museum of Man", where exhibits of human anatomy can be shown permanently. He once commented that after death he planned to donate plastinated wafers of his own body to several universities, so that in death he can (physically) teach at several locations, something he could not do while alive. However, he later changed his mind about this.

In January 2011, von Hagens announced that he was suffering from Parkinson's disease and that after his death his wife would plastinate his body and put his preserved corpse on display as part of the Body Worlds exhibitions. In October 2018, before the opening of a Body Worlds exhibition in London to put plastinated human body parts on permanent display, von Hagens said he wanted his own remains one day to be posed in the entrance, with his hand outstretched to greet visitors.

Von Hagens died from a cerebral hemorrhage complicated by Parkinson's disease on 24 July 2026, at the age of 81.

== Media appearances ==
In 2005, Channel 4 screened four programmes entitled Anatomy for Beginners, featuring Gunther von Hagens and the pathology professor John Lee dissecting a number of cadavers and discussing the structure and function of many of the body's parts.

A four-part follow-up series entitled Autopsy: Life and Death was aired on Channel 4 in 2006, in which von Hagens and Lee discussed common fatal diseases (circulatory issues, cancer, poisoning from organ failure, and ageing) with the aid of dissections.

Von Hagens made a guest appearance in an episode of the 2004 BBC series Regency House Party.

In November 2007, another series of three television programmes was broadcast entitled Autopsy: Emergency Room, showing what happens when the body is injured, and featuring presentations by the British Red Cross.

The Body Worlds exhibits were featured in a supposed Miami exhibition in the 2006 film Casino Royale, although the actual location for the exterior shots was the Ministry of Transport in Prague, Czech Republic. Von Hagens himself makes a cameo appearance in the film and can be seen leading a tour past where James Bond kills a villain.

== Patents ==
- U.S. patent 4,205,059 Animal and vegetal tissues permanently preserved by synthetic resin impregnation, filed November 1977, issued May 1980
- U.S. patent 4,278,701 Animal and vegetal tissues permanently preserved by synthetic resin impregnation, filed November 1979, issued July 1981
- U.S. patent 4,320,157 Method for preserving large sections of biological tissue with polymers, filed August 1980, issued March 1982
