= Rotherham General Hospital =

- Rotherham NHS Foundation Trust
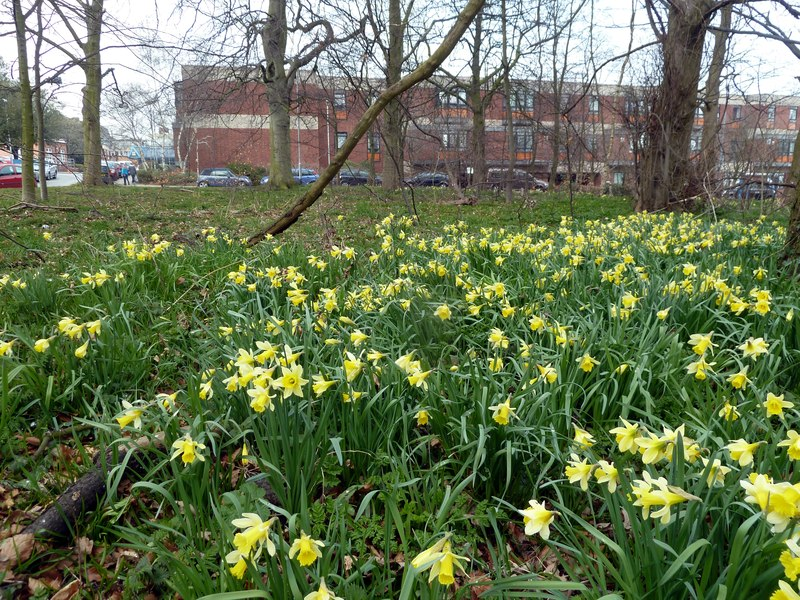
- Rotherham General Hospital

- Shown in South Yorkshire

Geography
- Location: Rotherham, South Yorkshire, England
- Coordinates: 53.4137°N 1.3431°W

Organisation
- Care system: NHS
- Type: District General

Services
- Emergency department: Yes

History
- Founded: 1914

Links
- Website: www.therotherhamft.nhs.uk
- Lists: Hospitals in England

Rotherham General Hospital is an acute general hospital in Rotherham, South Yorkshire, England. It is managed by the Rotherham NHS Foundation Trust.

== History ==
The hospital has its origins in a sanatorium created at Oakwood Hall for soldiers gassed in the trenches. A modern hospital was built on the Oakwood Hall estate between 1972 and 1978. The special care baby unit, which had been located at Doncaster Gate Hospital, was transferred to Rotherham General Hospital in 1984.

The hospital was featured in Can Gerry Robinson Fix the NHS? an Open University BBC series shown on BBC2 in January 2007. An updated urgent and emergency care centre was opened in 2017.

== See also ==
- List of hospitals in England
