= Can Gerry Robinson Fix the NHS? =

2007 British TV series

- Genre: Documentary
- Presented by: Gerry Robinson
- Country of origin: United Kingdom
- Original language: English
- No. of seasons: 2
- No. of episodes: 4

Original release
- Network: BBC2
- Release: 8 January – 10 January 2007

Related
- Can Gerry Robinson Fix the NHS? One Year On

Can Gerry Robinson Fix the NHS? is a three-part Open University BBC series shown on BBC2 from 8 to 10 January 2007. This is the second BBC series where Gerry Robinson works to turn around failing companies, but whereas his earlier series I'll Show Them Who's Boss had a commercial focus, this one deals with the public sector.

In order to explore the management culture at the NHS, Robinson is set the task of spending six months at Rotherham General Hospital to see if he could reduce waiting lists without any further spending. Robinson was convinced that he could bring commercial values to the public health sector and that his lessons could be applied nationwide:

"Any business, no matter how large, can be made to work well. I knew nothing about the medical profession but good management is good management – whether you’re running a corner shop or a large hospital. I was working in a hospital in Rotherham but the ideas we were trying could be applied across the NHS to any hospital, anywhere in the country".

After completing the series, Robinson gave an interview to the Open University explaining his conclusions and beliefs about what was needed in the NHS. Among his comments were:

I do believe that whilst there is a great deal one can do in terms of training people who already have a natural aptitude, unless you’re recruiting the very best young people, the very best senior people as a starting point so that they start to recognise those young people and bring them through, until we start taking the management of these complex organisations seriously, in the way that management is taken seriously in commercial organisations, frankly we’re just going to be chipping away at the edges of the problem in the NHS.... I think what the NHS needs to learn is that actually you don’t solve problems by throwing money at it, and not every problem actually needs money to solve it. That’s the first lesson. Secondly, to get out of their heads the idea that things have to take three years to do and get into the idea that there is a series of objectives that we need to do now, and that we’ve got months, not years to do it. Those two things, I think, would have the biggest single impact on the way that the Health Service is managed.
